= 2025 Copa Truck season =

Motorsport season

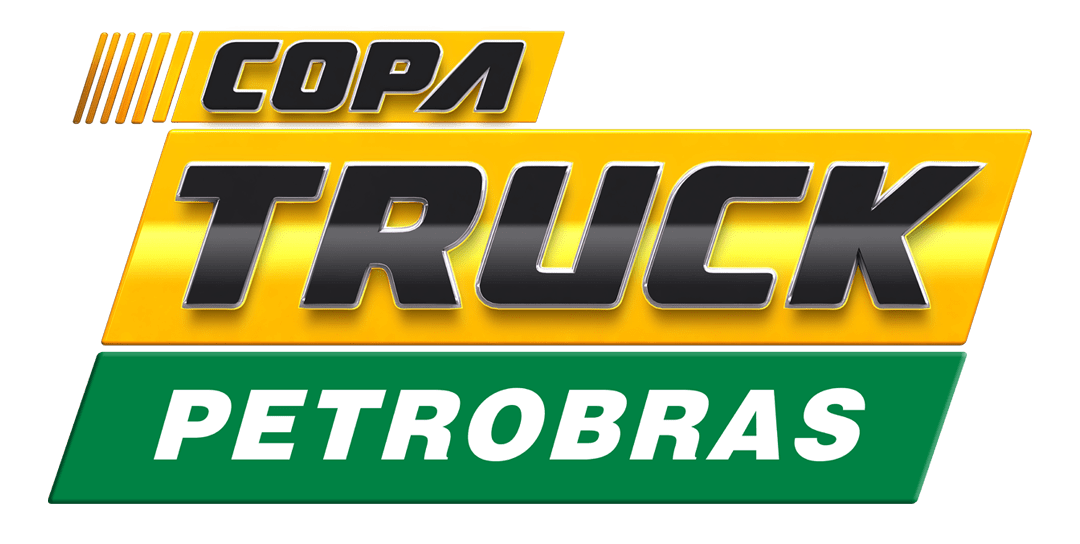
Official Logo

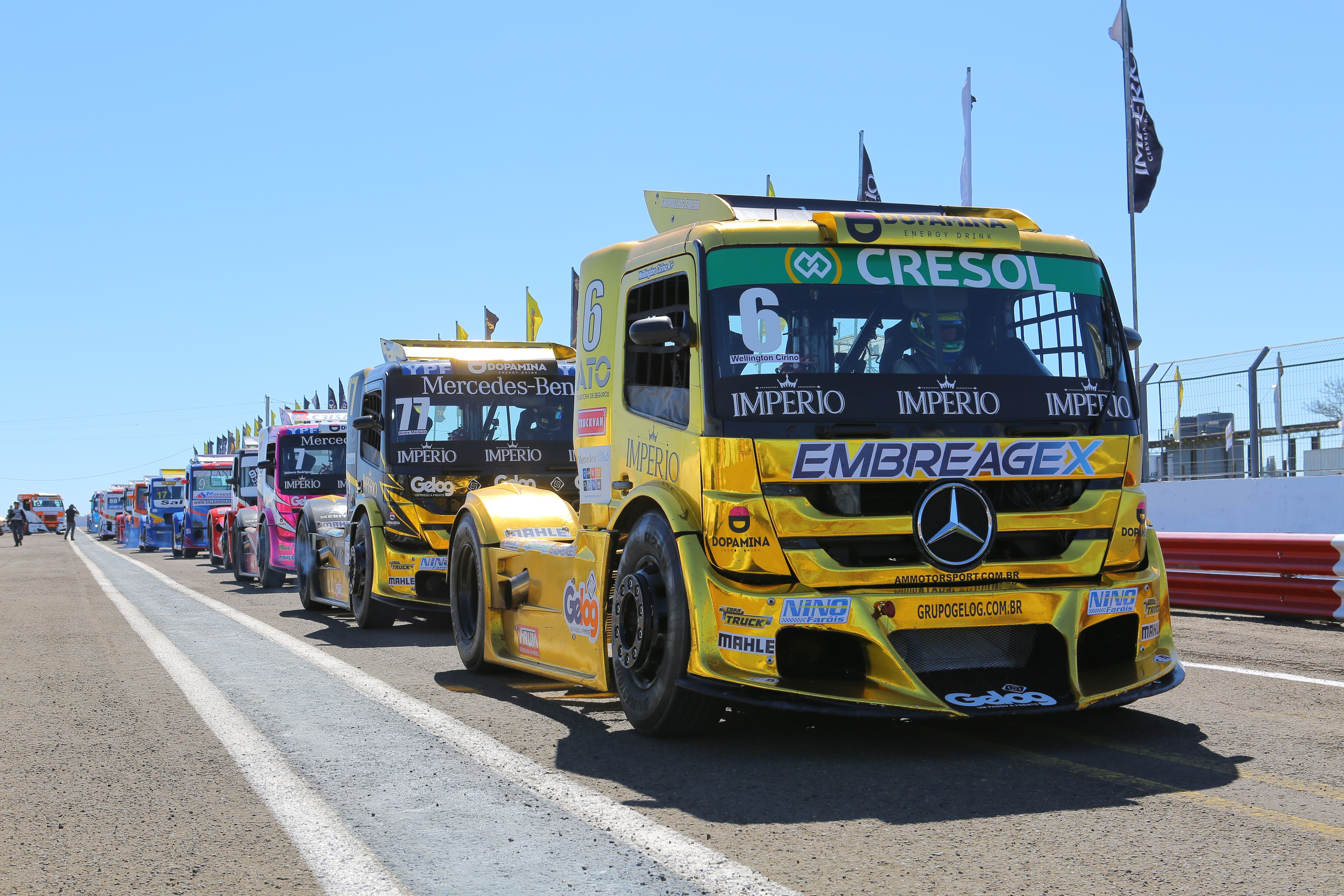
Copa Truck event

The 2025 Brazilian Truck Cup Championship was the ninth season of the Truck Cup. Reigning Champion Felipe Giaffone in a Volkswagen from R9 Competições threepeated as the Copa Truck Pro Champion in 2025, after claiming his fourth Copa Truck title after 2017, 2023 and 2024. Despite just one round win on the season his consistent podium and top 6 finishes gave him the title. Leandro Totti had the most wins of the season but a bad opening weekend without points, consistent second round finishes outside the points often after a first round win and a late season slump ruined his chance for the Title. Pedro Perdoncini gained the title in the Super Truck Elite Class in a sole point advantage over Arthur Scherer.

The category's origins came after nine teams left Formula Truck due to disagreements with the problematic management of Neusa Navarro Félix. These teams joined in an association to create the category that replaced Formula Truck. The new category brings together teams and drivers from the old category.

In November 2017, it was approved by the Brazilian Automobile Confederation (CBA) and recognized as an official championship. Carlos Col, former head of the Stock Car Pro Series, is its promoter.

The Truck Cup was officially launched on April 27, 2017, in São Paulo. In the first season, the championship was divided into three regional cups: Midwest, Northeast, and Southeast. The first stage took place on May 28, in Goiânia, with 17 trucks on the grid.

The association is made up of the following teams: RM Competições, AJ5 Sports, DF Motorsport, RVR Motorsports, Dakar Motors, Fábio Fogaça Motorsports, Lucar Motorsports and Clay Truck Racing.

== Calendar ==
=== Schedule ===
Round	Date	Grand Prix	Circuit	City	Hours	Info
1	March 23	(Mato Grosso do Sul) Grande Prêmio de Campo Grande	Autódromo Internacional Orlando Moura	Campo Grande, MS	12h10	
2	April 13	(Paraná (state)) Grande Prêmio de Londrina	Autódromo Internacional Ayrton Senna (Londrina)	Londrina, PR	14h40	
3	May 18	(São Paulo (state)) Grande Prêmio de São Paulo	Autódromo José Carlos Pace	São Paulo, SP	14h10	
4	June 15	(Rio Grande do Sul) Grande Prêmio de Tarumã	Autódromo Internacional de Tarumã	Viamão, RS	12h10	
5	July 13	(Paraná (state)) Grande Prêmio de Cascavel	Autódromo Internacional de Cascavel	Cascavel, PR	19h18	
6	August 24	(Minas Gerais) Grande Prêmio de Potenza	Autódromo Internacional Potenza	Lima Duarte, MG	12h10	
7	September 21	Grande Prêmio de Minas Gerais	Circuito dos Cristais	Curvelo, MG	12h10	
8	October 19	(Paraná (state)) Grande Prêmio do Paraná	Autódromo Internacional Ayrton Senna (Londrina)	Londrina, PR	12h10	
9	December 7	(São Paulo (state)) Grande Prêmio de Interlagos	Autódromo José Carlos Pace	São Paulo, SP	14h10	

=== Results ===
Round	Circuit	Date	Pole position	Fastest lap	Winning driver	Winning team	Constructor	Ref.
1	(Mato Grosso do Sul) Grande Prêmio de Campo Grande	March 23	(São Paulo (state)) Roberval Andrade	(São Paulo (state)) Raphael Abbate	(São Paulo (state)) Roberval Andrade	(Brazil) ASG Motorsport	(Germany) Mercedes-Benz	
1	(Mato Grosso do Sul) Grande Prêmio de Campo Grande	March 23	No dispute	(São Paulo (state)) André Marques	(São Paulo (state)) André Marques	(Brazil) R9 Competições	(Germany) Volkswagen	
2	(Paraná (state)) Grande Prêmio de Londrina	April 13	(Pernambuco) Beto Monteiro	(Paraná (state)) Leandro Totti	(Pernambuco) Beto Monteiro	(Brazil) R9 Competições	(Germany) Volkswagen	
2	(Paraná (state)) Grande Prêmio de Londrina	April 13	No dispute	(Paraná (state)) Jaidson Zini	(Paraná (state)) Leandro Totti	(Brazil) Vannucci Racing	(Italy) Iveco	
3	(São Paulo (state)) Grande Prêmio de São Paulo	May 18	(Paraná (state)) Leandro Totti	(Paraná (state)) Leandro Totti	(Paraná (state)) Leandro Totti	(Brazil) Vannucci Racing	(Italy) Iveco	
3	(São Paulo (state)) Grande Prêmio de São Paulo	May 18	No dispute	(Paraná (state)) Leandro Totti	(Paraná (state)) Leandro Totti	(Brazil) Vannucci Racing	(Italy) Iveco	
4	(Rio Grande do Sul) Grande Prêmio de Tarumã	June 15	(São Paulo (state)) Raphael Abbate	(Paraná (state)) Leandro Totti	(São Paulo (state)) Raphael Abbate	(Brazil) ASG Motorsport	(Germany) Mercedes-Benz	
4	(Rio Grande do Sul) Grande Prêmio de Tarumã	June 15	No dispute	(São Paulo (state)) Roberval Andrade	(Paraná (state)) Wellington Cirino	(Brazil) Iveco Usual Racing	(Italy) Iveco	
5	(Paraná (state)) Grande Prêmio de Cascavel	July 13	(Pernambuco) Beto Monteiro	(Pernambuco) Beto Monteiro	(Pernambuco) Beto Monteiro	(Brazil) R9 Competições	(Germany) Volkswagen	
5	(Paraná (state)) Grande Prêmio de Cascavel	July 13	No dispute	(Pernambuco) Beto Monteiro	(Pernambuco) Beto Monteiro	(Brazil) R9 Competições	(Germany) Volkswagen	
6	(Minas Gerais) Grande Prêmio de Potenza	August 24	(Paraná (state)) Leandro Totti	(Paraná (state)) Leandro Totti	(Paraná (state)) Leandro Totti	(Brazil) Vannucci Racing	(Italy) Iveco	
6	(Minas Gerais) Grande Prêmio de Potenza	August 24	No dispute	(São Paulo (state)) André Marques	(São Paulo (state)) Felipe Giaffone	(Brazil) R9 Competições	(Germany) Volkswagen	
7	Grande Prêmio de Minas Gerais	September 21	(Paraná (state)) Leandro Totti	(São Paulo (state)) Raphael Abbate	(Paraná (state)) Leandro Totti	(Brazil) Vannucci Racing	(Italy) Iveco	
7	Grande Prêmio de Minas Gerais	September 21	No dispute	(São Paulo (state)) Danilo Dirani	(São Paulo (state)) Danilo Dirani	(Brazil) Iveco Usual Racing	(Italy) Iveco	
8	(Paraná (state)) Grande Prêmio do Paraná	October 19	(Paraná (state)) Leandro Totti	(São Paulo (state)) Danilo Dirani	(São Paulo (state)) Raphael Abbate	(Brazil) ASG Motorsport	(Germany) Mercedes-Benz	
8	(Paraná (state)) Grande Prêmio do Paraná	October 19	No dispute	(Paraná (state)) Wellington Cirino	(São Paulo (state)) Fábio Fogaça	(Brazil) D+ Motorsport	(Germany) Mercedes-Benz	
9	(São Paulo (state)) Grande Prêmio de Interlagos	December 7	(Paraná (state)) Leandro Totti	(Paraná (state)) Leandro Totti	(Paraná (state)) Leandro Totti	(Brazil) Vannucci Racing	(Italy) Iveco	
9	(São Paulo (state)) Grande Prêmio de Interlagos	December 7	No dispute	(Pernambuco) Beto Monteiro	(São Paulo (state)) Paulo Salustiano	(Brazil) Odapel/R9 Racing	(Germany) Volkswagen	

== Championship standings ==
Scoring tables

=== Super Truck Pro Category ===
Pos	Driver	(Mato Grosso do Sul) CGR		(Paraná (state)) LON		(São Paulo (state)) SPO		(Rio Grande do Sul) TAR		(Paraná (state)) CAS		(Minas Gerais) POT		(Minas Gerais) MGS		(Paraná (state)) PAR		(São Paulo (state)) INT		Pts
Pos	Driver	RD1	RD2	RD1	RD2	RD1	RD2	RD1	RD2	RD1	RD2	RD1	RD2	RD1	RD2	RD1	RD2	RD1	RD2	Pts
1	(São Paulo (state)) Felipe Giaffone	4	3	4	2	6	2	3	6	16	Ret	2	1	2	16	3	4	6	12	228
2	(São Paulo (state)) Danilo Dirani	12	8	2	10	5	3	11	9	9	7	6	3	3	1	6	2	3	3	222
3	(São Paulo (state)) Raphael Abbate	3	4	5	4	2	6	1	7	2	17	4	Ret	17	9	1	7	4	Ret	209
4	(Pernambuco) Beto Monteiro	2	10	1	16	Ret	NL	4	3	1	1	3	Ret	8	4	15	12	2	5	208
5	(Paraná (state)) Leandro Totti	Ret	DNS	3	1	1	1	2	13	4	14	1	Ret	1	15	16	17	1	14	203
6	(Paraná (state)) Wellington Cirino	7	2	11	9	14	4	6	1	5	9	10	4	16	12	7	3	14	DNS	174
7	(São Paulo (state)) André Marques	6	1	7	3	3	16	10	15			7	2	5	3	10	8	17	Ret	166
8	(São Paulo (state)) Bia Figueiredo	10	Ret	12	5	7	8	Ret	DNS	6	6	8	AN	4	5	5	13	5	15	147
9	(Paraná (state)) Jaidson Zini	5	6	6	17	19	10	7	5	7	13	11	Ret	11	11	12	14	9	4	141
10	(São Paulo (state)) Victor Franzoni	8	Ret	8	14	18	Ret	14	12	8	Ret	16	Ret	9	6	2	5	7	2	125
11	(Santa Catarina (state)) Danilo Alamini	Ret	NL	9	6	11	9	9	8	10	4	12	5	12	Ret	Ret	11	15	8	123
12	(São Paulo (state)) Fábio Fogaça	14	11	Ret	INF	20	13	12	10	Ret	2	DNF	NL	7	2	8	1	Ret	6	119
13	(Santa Catarina (state)) Felipe Tozzo	Ret	Ret	18	Ret	16	11	8	2	19	8	9	9	13	8	4	6	Ret	DNS	104
14	(São Paulo (state)) Evandro Camargo	Ret	NC	10	7	12	NL	5	4	3	11	13	DNS	Ret	DNS	9	18			95
15	(São Paulo (state)) Luiz Lopes	9	9	20	Ret	15	12			13	10	17	6	14	10	13	10	11	7	93
16	(São Paulo (state)) Alberto Cattucci	11	7	19	13	9	Ret	Ret	17	12	5	14	8	10	DNS	18	DNS	10	9	92
17	(São Paulo (state)) Paulo Salustiano	Ret	Ret	14	Ret	17	5	DNQ	11	15	Ret	5	Ret	6	Ret	Ret	DNS	8	1	84
18	(Paraná (state)) Débora Rodrigues	DNS	DNS	13	12	10	15	15	18	18	12	15	7	18	14	14	16	13	11	69
19	(Mato Grosso) Pedro Paulo Fernandes	13	Ret	17	8	8	7	Ret	Ret	11	Ret	NC	DNS	15	7	Ret	DNS	16	10	61
20	(São Paulo (state)) Roberval Andrade	1	5	15	DNS	4	14	16	19											59
21	(Rio de Janeiro (state)) Thiago Rizzo	Ret	Wth	Ret	11	13	17	13	14	14	15	Ret	NPQ	Ret	13	11	9	12	Ret	55
22	(São Paulo (state)) Adalberto Jardim	Ret	Wth	16	15	Ret	Ret	NC	16	Ret	3	NE	Ret	Ret	DNS	Ret	DNS	Ret	DNS	19
23	(São Paulo (state)) Rafael Reis																	18	13	3
24	(Rio Grande do Sul) Régis Boessio									17	16					17	15	Ret	DNS	1
Pos	Driver	(Mato Grosso do Sul) CGR		(Paraná (state)) LON		(São Paulo (state)) SPO		(Rio Grande do Sul) TAR		(Paraná (state)) CAS		(Minas Gerais) POT		(Minas Gerais) MGS		(Paraná (state)) PAR		(São Paulo (state)) INT		Pts

Color	Result
Gold	Winner
Silver	2nd-place finish
Bronze	3rd-place finish
Green	Top 5 finish
Light Blue	Top 10 finish
Dark Blue	Other flagged position
Purple	Did not finish
Red	Did not qualify (DNQ)
Brown	Withdrew (Wth)
Black	Disqualified (DSQ)
White	Did Not Start (DNS)
White	Race abandoned (C)
Blank	Did not participate

=== Categoría Super Truck Elite ===
Pos	Driver	(Mato Grosso do Sul) CGR		(Paraná (state)) LON		(São Paulo (state)) SPO		(Rio Grande do Sul) TAR		(Paraná (state)) CAS		(Minas Gerais) POT		(Minas Gerais) MGS		(Paraná (state)) PAR		(São Paulo (state)) INT		Pts
Pos	Driver	RD1	RD2	RD1	RD2	RD1	RD2	RD1	RD2	RD1	RD2	RD1	RD2	RD1	RD2	RD1	RD2	RD1	RD2	Pts
1	(Paraná (state)) Pedro Perdoncini	1	5	Ret	DNS	1	2	5	1	6	2	1	DSQ	2	5	1	8	3	5	259
2	(São Paulo (state)) Arthur Scherer	3	6	4	4	7	1	1	2	3	3	Ret	DNS	4	4	2	4	4	1	258
3	(São Paulo (state)) Léo Rufino	7	3	3	5	2	4	15	DNP	5	1	3	2	3	9	11	Ret	5	2	227
4	(São Paulo (state)) Nicolas Giaffone	8	1	1	6	16	6	2	11	13	4	12	3	1	2	3	7	9	12	225
5	(Bahia) Diogo Moscato	2	2	2	2	3	13	3	5	14	10	9	6	5	12	Ret	DNS	6	11	193
6	(São Paulo (state)) Ricardo Alvarez	9	7	10	8	13	12	10	7	10	9	5	1	9	6	7	5	1	4	191
7	(Espírito Santo) Hugo Cibien	4	4	DNS	NC	5	5	6	Ret	1	6	AT	AT	7	3	14	10	7	8	162
8	(Paraná (state)) Rodrigo Taborda	Ret	DNS	6	Ret	8	7	7	12	Ret	13	4	Ret	8	1	4	6	2	Ret	153
9	(São Paulo (state)) Djalma Pivetta	5	9	9	7	4	14	4	3	7	DSQ	2	8	DNS	DNS	Ret	DNS	10	9	144
10	(São Paulo (state)) José Augusto Dias	15	Ret	5	1	12	NL			15	Ret	10	5	12	8	6	2	8	3	142
11	(Rio Grande do Sul) Maicon Roncen	13	10	Ret	Ret	14	9	11	Ret	16	8	7	4	11	7	8	1	12	7	139
12	(São Paulo (state)) Kléber Eletric	6	Ret	12	10	9	3	12	13	11	12	Ret	DSQ	6	Ret	5	3	14	Ret	126
13	(São Paulo (state)) Daniel Keleman	14	Ret	7	9	6	8			9	Ret	6	Ret	13	11	10	12	Ret	Ret	95
14	(Mato Grosso) Juca Bala	12	Ret	15	11	11	10	14	10	17	Ret	11	9	10	13	Ret	DNS	13	10	87
15	(São Paulo (state)) Márcio Giordano	Ret	DNS	11	13	10	Ret	8	4	8	Ret	DNS	INF			13	9	11	6	87
16	(São Paulo (state)) Maurício Arias	Ret	NPQ	13	12	17	NL	Ret	DNQ	4	7	8	7	Ret	OUT	9	11	Ret	DNS	73
17	(Paraná (state)) Thaline Chicoski	11	Ret	14	Ret	15	11	9	9	12	11			Ret	10	Ret	DNS	Ret	DNS	62
18	(São Paulo (state)) Rafa Lopes							13	6	2	5									49
19	(São Paulo (state)) Felipe Gama	10	8	8	3															44
20	(São Paulo (state)) André Magno													Wth	DNF	12	13	Ret	DNS	11
21	(São Paulo (state)) Luan Lopes							Ret	8											8
22	(Pernambuco) Sérgio Ramalho					18	NL													0
23	(São Paulo (state)) Beto Cavaleiro							DNS	DNS											0
Pos	Driver	(Mato Grosso do Sul) CGR		(Paraná (state)) LON		(São Paulo (state)) SPO		(Rio Grande do Sul) TAR		(Paraná (state)) CAS		(Minas Gerais) POT		(Minas Gerais) MGS		(Paraná (state)) PAR		(São Paulo (state)) INT		Pts

=== Constructors' Championship standings ===
Pos	Constructor	(Mato Grosso do Sul) CGR		(Paraná (state)) LON		(São Paulo (state)) SPO		(Rio Grande do Sul) TAR		(Paraná (state)) CAS		(Minas Gerais) POT		(Minas Gerais) MGS		(Paraná (state)) PAR		(São Paulo (state)) INT		Pts
Pos	Constructor	RD1	RD2	RD1	RD2	RD1	RD2	RD1	RD2	RD1	RD2	RD1	RD2	RD1	RD2	RD1	RD2	RD1	RD2	Pts
1	(Germany) Volkswagen	2	1	1	2	3	2	3	3	1	1	2	1	2	3	3	4	2	1	571
1	(Germany) Volkswagen	4	3	4	3	6	5	4	6	6	4	3	2	5	4	10	8	6	5	571
3	(Italy) Iveco	7	2	2	1	1	1	2	1	4	7	1	3	1	1	4	2	1	3	550
3	(Italy) Iveco	13	9	3	9	5	3	6	2	5	8	6	4	3	8	6	3	3	21	550
2	(Germany) Mercedes-Benz	1	4	5	4	2	6	1	4	2	2	4	5	4	2	1	1	4	2	540
2	(Germany) Mercedes-Benz	3	5	6	5	4	7	5	5	3	3	8	7	7	5	2	5	5	4	540
4	(Sweden) Volvo	15	12	20	Ret	19	16	22	31	16	18	16	Ret	24	15	15	20	14	20	21
4	(Sweden) Volvo	Ret	DNS	DNS	NC	25	18	23	Ret	20	25	AT	AT	25	17	29	24	20	Ret	21
5	(Sweden) Scania	17	Ret	26	24	26	13	28	29	27	28	28	18	23	29	16	17	31	22	3
5	(Sweden) Scania	24	Ret	31	26	28	22	30	32	33	Ret	Ret	DSQ	27	Ret	26	28	32	Ret	3
Pos	Constructor	(Mato Grosso do Sul) CGR		(Paraná (state)) LON		(São Paulo (state)) SPO		(Rio Grande do Sul) TAR		(Paraná (state)) CAS		(Minas Gerais) POT		(Minas Gerais) MGS		(Paraná (state)) PAR		(São Paulo (state)) INT		Pts

=== Points standings ===
Points	1°	2°	3°	4°	5°	6°	7°	8°	9°	10°	11°	12°	13°	14°	15°
Race 1	22	20	18	16	15	14	13	12	11	10	9	8	7	6	5
Race 2	18	16	14	12	11	10	9	8	7	6	5	4	3	2	1

== See also ==
- 2025 Stock Car Pro Series
- 2025 Stock Light
- Brasileiro de Marcas
- Moto 1000 GP
- SuperBike Brasil
- Fórmula Truck
