= 2021 Copa Truck season =

Truck racing competition

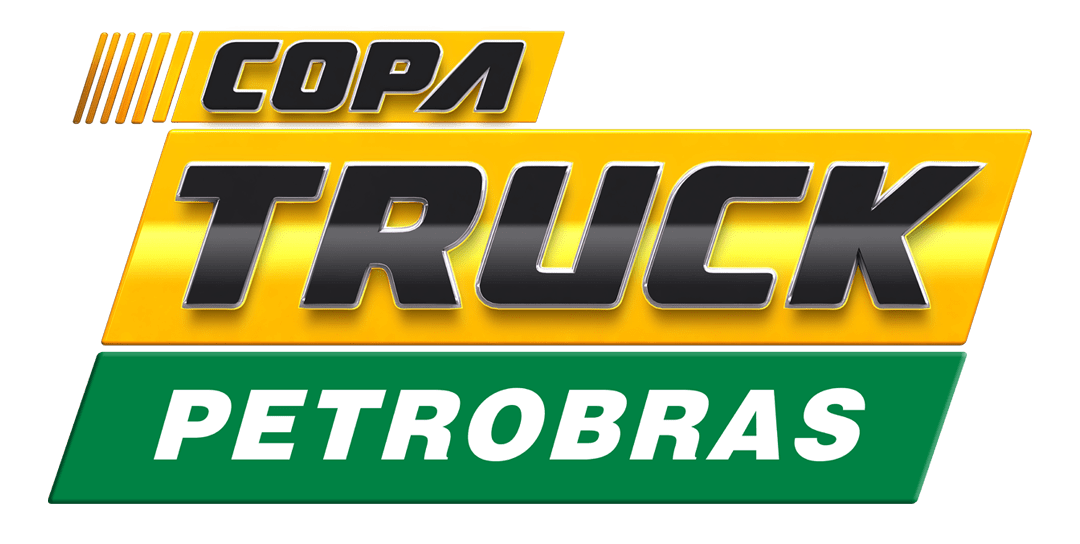
Official Logo

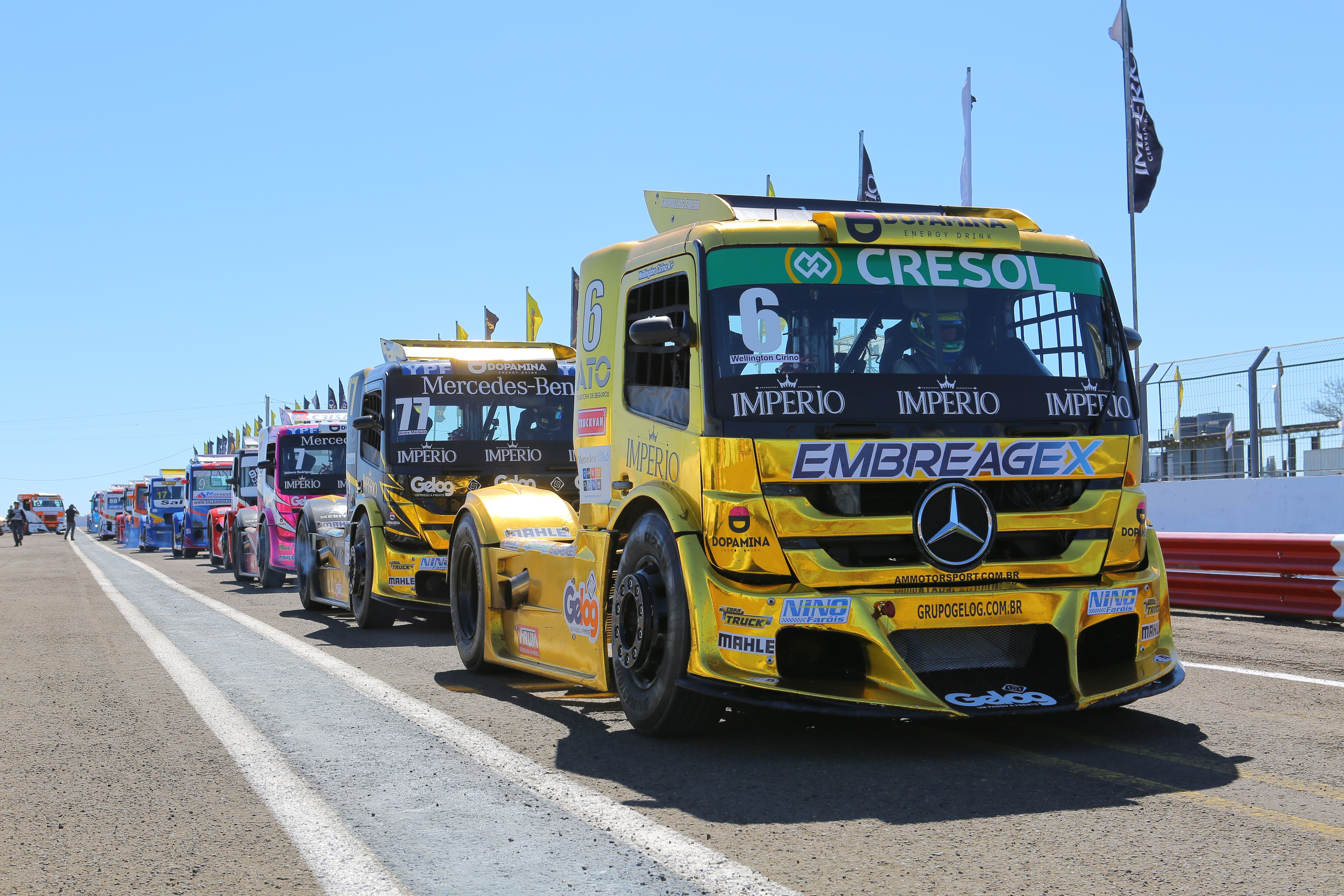
Copa Truck event

The 2021 Campeonato Brasileiro de Copa Truck was the fifth season of the Copa Truck. André Marques achieved his first Copa Truck title in a Mercedes-Benz with his own team AM Motorsport, which was the champion team. The newly introduced Super Class was won by Felipe Tozzo onboard a Dakar Motorsport Iveco.

The series is administered at the national level by the Brazilian Automobile Confederation (CBA). 2021 saw the Series switch from Pirelli to Goodyear as Official Supplier for all Teams.

The category's origins came after nine teams left Formula Truck due to disagreements with the problematic management of Neusa Navarro Félix. These teams joined together in an association to create the category that replaced Formula Truck. The new category brings together teams and drivers from the old category.

In November 2017, it was approved by the Brazilian Automobile Confederation (CBA) and recognized as an official championship. Carlos Col, former head of the Stock Car Pro Series, is its promoter.

The Truck Cup was officially launched on April 27, 2017, in São Paulo. In the first season, the championship was divided into three regional cups: Midwest, Northeast, and Southeast. The first stage took place on May 28, in Goiânia, with 17 trucks on the grid.

The association is made up of the following teams: RM Competições, AJ5 Sports, DF Motorsport, RVR Motorsports, Dakar Motors, Fábio Fogaça Motorsports, Lucar Motorsports and Clay Truck Racing.

== Teams and drivers ==
All the drivers are Brazilian.

Team	Manufacturer	Tires	No.	Driver	Rounds
(Brazil) Dakar Motorsport	Iveco	G	57	(Santa Catarina (state)) Felipe Tozzo	All
(Brazil) Usual Iveco Racing	Iveco	G	2	(Paraná (state)) Valmir Benavides	1–7
(Brazil) Usual Iveco Racing	Iveco	G	22	(São Paulo (state)) Raphael Abbate	8
(Brazil) Usual Iveco Racing	Iveco	G	4	(São Paulo (state)) Felipe Giaffone	All
(Brazil) Usual Iveco Racing	Iveco	G	21	(São Paulo (state)) Djalma Pivetta	All
(Brazil) AJ5 Eco Sports Reman Brasil	Reman Brasil	G	5	(São Paulo (state)) Adalberto Jardim	All
(Brazil) R9 Competições	Volkswagen	G	7	(Paraná (state)) Débora Rodrigues	All
(Brazil) R9 Competições	Volkswagen	G	15	(São Paulo (state)) Roberval Andrade	All
(Brazil) R9 Competições	Volkswagen	G	55	(São Paulo (state)) Paulo Salustiano	All
(Brazil) R9 Competições	Volkswagen	G	81	(São Paulo (state)) José Augusto Dias	All
(Brazil) R9 Competições	Volkswagen	G	88	(Pernambuco) Beto Monteiro	All
(Brazil) R9 Competições	MAN SE	G	00	(Santa Catarina (state)) Danilo Alamini	All
(Brazil) FF Motorsport	Protótipo	G	8	(São Paulo (state)) Rodrigo Pimenta	1–4, 6–8
(Brazil) FF Motorsport	Protótipo	G	27	(São Paulo (state)) Fábio Fogaça	All
(Brazil) FF Motorsport	Protótipo	G	26	(Pernambuco) Sérgio Ramalho	5
(Brazil) AM Motorsport	Mercedes-Benz	G	6	(Paraná (state)) Wellington Cirino	All
(Brazil) AM Motorsport	Mercedes-Benz	G	90	(São Paulo (state)) Giuliano Losacco	All
(Brazil) AM Motorsport	Mercedes-Benz	G	77	(São Paulo (state)) André Marques	All
(Brazil) ADF Competições	Mercedes-Benz	G	25	(Paraná (state)) Jaidson Zini	All
(Brazil) ADF Competições	Mercedes-Benz	G	64	(São Paulo (state)) Evandro Camargo	1–4, 6–8
(Brazil) Boessio Competições	Volvo	G	85	(Rio Grande do Sul) Maicon Roncen	1–2
(Brazil) Boessio Competições	Volvo	G	83	(Rio Grande do Sul) Régis Boéssio	5-7
(Brazil) PP Motorsport	Mercedes-Benz	G	28	(São Paulo (state)) Danilo Dirani	All
(Brazil) PP Motorsport	Mercedes-Benz	G	29	(Mato Grosso) Pedro Paulo Fernandes	All
(Brazil) BRUTO Motorsports	Scania	G	3	(São Paulo (state)) Ricardo Alvarez	2–4, 6–8
(Brazil) Lucar Autosport	Iveco	G	99	(São Paulo (state)) Luiz Lopes	All
(Brazil) LT Team	Volvo	G	115	(Pernambuco) Carlos Machado	1
(Brazil) LT Team	Volvo	G	73	(Paraná (state)) Leandro Totti	3–4
(Brazil) AM Super	Mercedes-Benz	G	31	(São Paulo (state)) Glauco Barros	All
(Brazil) AM Super	Mercedes-Benz	G	45	(São Paulo (state)) Daniel Kelemen	All

== Race calendar and results ==
The Copa Truck is divided into four parallel championships with two stages (South Truck Cup, Southeast Truck Cup, Midwest Truck Cup and Mercosul Truck Cup), totaling eight stages. And a ninth stage, denominated The Great Final, will define the general champion of the category.

=== Grand Prix ===
Round	Date	Grand Prix	Circuit	City	Schedule	Info
1	May 23	Grande Prêmio de Goiás	Autódromo Ayrton Senna	Goiânia, GO	14h08	
2	June 27	(São Paulo (state)) Grande Prêmio de São Paulo	Autódromo Internacional de Interlagos	São Paulo, SP	13h00	
3	July 17	(Paraná (state)) Grande Prêmio de Cascavel	Autódromo Internacional de Cascavel	Cascavel, PR	15h00	
4	July 18	(Paraná (state)) Grande Prêmio de Cascavel	Autódromo Internacional de Cascavel	Cascavel, PR	14h45	
5	August 15	(Rio Grande do Sul) Grande Prêmio de Tarumã	Autódromo de Tarumã	Viamão, RS	14h05	
6	September 4	(Paraná (state)) Grande Prêmio de Curitiba	Autódromo Internacional de Curitiba	Curitiba, PR	14h13	
7	September 5	(Paraná (state)) Grande Prêmio de Curitiba	Autódromo Internacional de Curitiba	Curitiba, PR	14h13	
8	October 3	(Minas Gerais) Grande Prêmio de Potenza	Autódromo Internacional Potenza	Lima Duarte, MG	13h15	
9	December 5	(Paraná (state)) Grande Prêmio de Curitiba	Autódromo Internacional de Curitiba	Curitiba, PR	11h00	
Race canceled due to COVID-19 pandemic						
-	April 11	(Paraná (state)) Grande Prêmio de Curitiba	Autódromo Internacional de Curitiba	Curitiba, PR	Cancelled	

=== Results ===
Round	Circuit	Date	Pole position	Fastest lap	Winning driver	Winning team	Constructor	Ref.
1	Grande Prêmio de Goiás	May 23	(São Paulo (state)) Felipe Giaffone	(São Paulo (state)) Felipe Giaffone	(São Paulo (state)) Felipe Giaffone	(Brazil) Usual Iveco Racing	(Italy) Iveco	
1	Grande Prêmio de Goiás	May 23	No dispute	(São Paulo (state)) André Marques	(São Paulo (state)) André Marques	(Brazil) AM Motorsport	(Germany) Mercedes-Benz	
2	(São Paulo (state)) Grande Prêmio de São Paulo	June 27	(Paraná (state)) Wellington Cirino	(São Paulo (state)) Roberval Andrade	(Paraná (state)) Wellington Cirino	(Brazil) AM Motorsport	(Germany) Mercedes-Benz	
2	(São Paulo (state)) Grande Prêmio de São Paulo	June 27	No dispute	(São Paulo (state)) Paulo Salustiano	(São Paulo (state)) Paulo Salustiano	(Brazil) R9 Competições	(Germany) Volkswagen	
3	(Paraná (state)) Grande Prêmio de Cascavel	July 17	(Paraná (state)) Wellington Cirino	(São Paulo (state)) André Marques	(São Paulo (state)) André Marques	(Brazil) AM Motorsport	(Germany) Mercedes-Benz	
3	(Paraná (state)) Grande Prêmio de Cascavel	July 17	No dispute	(São Paulo (state)) André Marques	(São Paulo (state)) Danilo Dirani	(Brazil) PP Motorsport	(Germany) Mercedes-Benz	
4	(Paraná (state)) Grande Prêmio de Cascavel	July 18	(São Paulo (state)) André Marques	(São Paulo (state)) André Marques	(São Paulo (state)) André Marques	(Brazil) AM Motorsport	(Germany) Mercedes-Benz	
4	(Paraná (state)) Grande Prêmio de Cascavel	July 18	No dispute	(São Paulo (state)) Danilo Dirani	(São Paulo (state)) Danilo Dirani	(Brazil) PP Motorsport	(Germany) Mercedes-Benz	
5	(Rio Grande do Sul) Grande Prêmio de Tarumã	August 15	(São Paulo (state)) André Marques	(São Paulo (state)) André Marques	(São Paulo (state)) André Marques	(Brazil) AM Motorsport	(Germany) Mercedes-Benz	
5	(Rio Grande do Sul) Grande Prêmio de Tarumã	August 15	No dispute	(Rio Grande do Sul) Régis Boéssio	(Rio Grande do Sul) Régis Boéssio	(Brazil) Boessio Competições	(Sweden) Volvo	
6	(Paraná (state)) Grande Prêmio de Curitiba	September 4	(Pernambuco) Beto Monteiro	(Pernambuco) Beto Monteiro	(Pernambuco) Beto Monteiro	(Brazil) R9 Competições	(Germany) Volkswagen	
6	(Paraná (state)) Grande Prêmio de Curitiba	September 4	No dispute	(Pernambuco) Beto Monteiro	(Pernambuco) Beto Monteiro	(Brazil) R9 Competições	(Germany) Volkswagen	
7	(Paraná (state)) Grande Prêmio de Curitiba	September 5	(Pernambuco) Beto Monteiro	(São Paulo (state)) André Marques	(São Paulo (state)) André Marques	(Brazil) AM Motorsport	(Germany) Mercedes-Benz	
7	(Paraná (state)) Grande Prêmio de Curitiba	September 5	No dispute	(São Paulo (state)) André Marques	(São Paulo (state)) André Marques	(Brazil) AM Motorsport	(Germany) Mercedes-Benz	
8	(Minas Gerais) Grande Prêmio de Potenza	October 3	(São Paulo (state)) Felipe Giaffone	(São Paulo (state)) Felipe Giaffone	(São Paulo (state)) Felipe Giaffone	(Brazil) Usual Iveco Racing	(Italy) Iveco	
8	(Minas Gerais) Grande Prêmio de Potenza	October 3	No dispute	(São Paulo (state)) Paulo Salustiano	(São Paulo (state)) Danilo Dirani	(Brazil) PP Motorsport	(Germany) Mercedes-Benz	
9	(Paraná (state)) Grande Prêmio de Curitiba	December 5	(São Paulo (state)) Paulo Salustiano	(São Paulo (state)) Paulo Salustiano	(São Paulo (state)) Paulo Salustiano	(Brazil) PP Motorsport	(Germany) Mercedes-Benz	
9	(Paraná (state)) Grande Prêmio de Curitiba	December 5	No dispute	(Pernambuco) Beto Monteiro	(Pernambuco) Beto Monteiro	(Brazil) R9 Competições	(Germany) Volkswagen	

Obs: Schedule pending and subject to change due to the COVID-19 pandemic.

== Championship standings ==
=== Pro Category ===
Pos	Driver	(Goiás) GOI		(São Paulo (state)) INT		(Paraná (state)) CAS		(Paraná (state)) CAS		(Rio Grande do Sul) TAR		(Paraná (state)) CTB		(Paraná (state)) CTB		(Minas Gerais) POT		(Paraná (state)) CTB		Pts
1	(São Paulo (state)) André Marques	3	1	6	7	1	8	1	6	1	6	RET	2	1	1	3	3	3	4	257
2	(Paraná (state)) Wellington Cirino	4	2	1	4	2	5	2	8	2	5	3	3	3	RET	9	6	2	5	244
3	(São Paulo (state)) Felipe Giaffone	1	RET	4	3	8	2	8	5	4	9	2	4	2	2	1	7	6	2	239
4	(São Paulo (state)) Paulo Salustiano	RET	NL	2	1	6	4	6	4	3	3	15	NL	RET	3	4	2	1	3	218
5	(Pernambuco) Beto Monteiro	DSQ	DSQ	3	6	5	3	3	7	15	8	1	1	RET	13	2	5	8	1	197
6	(São Paulo (state)) Luiz Lopes	12	10	11	13	9	13	12	12	14	17	9	10	16	RET	12	RET	15	10	150
7	(São Paulo (state)) Danilo Dirani	RET	NL	RET	NL	3	1	5	1	9	15	RET	NL	RET	RET	7	1	4	6	145
8	(São Paulo (state)) Adalberto Jardim	6	RET	12	8	11	10	13	11	10	14	RET	7	5	7	6	4	RET	RET	144
9	(São Paulo (state)) Roberval Andrade	DSQ	DSQ	5	2	4	6	4	3	RET	NL	RET	NL	8	RET	5	RET	5	8	143
10	(Paraná (state)) Jaidson Zini	14	7	8	12	17	18	10	9	7	2	RET	RET	RET	RET	8	9	RET	RET	128
11	(Paraná (state)) Valmir Benavides	7	6	17	10	7	7	15	RET	17	11	RET	NL	18	RET			11	9	124
12	(Paraná (state)) Débora Rodrigues	RET	NL	15	11	RET	NL	16	13	18	13	4	6	15	5	17	RET	9	14	123
13	(São Paulo (state)) Giuliano Losacco	2	3	19	NL	10	RET	11	RET	5	7	10	13	14	8	18	17	7	RET	107
14	(Santa Catarina (state)) Felipe Tozzo	5	5	10	18	12	9	9	10	RET	NL	16	12	6	10	13	8	10	11	106
15	(São Paulo (state)) José Augusto Dias	9	4	Wth	Wth	13	RET	14	18	11	10	6	5	4	6	20	12	20	18	102
16	(São Paulo (state)) Fábio Fogaça	RET	NL	9	RET	18	NL	22	RET	6	4	5	8	11	RET	RET	NL	12	RET	77
17	(Santa Catarina (state)) Danilo Alamini	RET	RET	18	14	14	11	20	15	21	18	8	9	7	4	RET	NL	14	7	71
18	(São Paulo (state)) Evandro Camargo	8	8	20	9	RET	12	18	14			7	11	9	16	21	RET	16	12	66
19	(São Paulo (state)) Djalma Pivetta	11	9	13	RET	16	15	RET	RET	20	16	11	14	10	11	16	16	17	13	63
20	(Mato Grosso) Pedro Paulo Fernandes	RET	NL	7	5	RET	NL	RET	RET	12	20	14	NL	RET	RET	15	10	13	RET	45
21	(Rio Grande do Sul) Régis Boéssio									8	1	RET	NL	RET	15			RET	RET	41
22	(São Paulo (state)) Glauco Barros	13	11	16	15	15	14	17	16	16	19	13	15	13	12	22	RET	18	RET	39
23	(Paraná (state)) Leandro Totti					RET	NL	7	2											29
24	(São Paulo (state)) Daniel Kelemen	10	RET	RET	16	19	16	19	17	19	21	RET	16	12	9	10	15	19	16	25
25	(Paraná (state)) Pedro Muffato																	23	17	14
26	(Pernambuco) Sérgio Ramalho									13	12									11
27	(São Paulo (state)) Ricardo Alvarez			14	17	21	17	21	19			RET	17	17	14	19	14	RET	RET	8
28	(São Paulo (state)) Rodrigo Pimenta	RET	RET	RET	NL	20	RET	23	20			12	RET	NL	RET	11	11	22	RET	8
29	(Paraná (state)) Rodrigo Taborda																	21	15	1
30	(São Paulo (state)) Raphael Abbate															14	13			0
31	(Rio Grande do Sul) Maicon Roncen	RET	NL	RET	NL															0
32	(São Paulo (state)) Luciano Burti									RET	RET									0
33	(Pernambuco) Carlos Machado	DSQ	DSQ																	0
Pos	Driver	(Goiás) GOI		(São Paulo (state)) INT		(Paraná (state)) CAS		(Paraná (state)) CAS		(Rio Grande do Sul) TAR		(Paraná (state)) CTB		(Paraná (state)) CTB		(Minas Gerais) POT		(Paraná (state)) CTB		Pts

Color	Result
Gold	Winner
Silver	2nd-place finish
Bronze	3rd-place finish
Green	Top 5 finish
Light Blue	Top 10 finish
Dark Blue	Other flagged position
Purple	Did not finish
Red	Did not qualify (DNQ)
Brown	Withdrew (Wth)
Black	Disqualified (DSQ)
White	Did Not Start (DNS)
White	Race abandoned (C)
Blank	Did not participate

=== Categoría Super ===
Pos	Driver	(Goiás) GOI		(São Paulo (state)) INT		(Paraná (state)) CAS		(Paraná (state)) CAS		(Rio Grande do Sul) TAR		(Paraná (state)) CTB		(Paraná (state)) CTB		(Minas Gerais) POT		(Paraná (state)) CTB		Pts
1	(Santa Catarina (state)) Felipe Tozzo	2	3	3	7	2	1	1	1	RET	NL	10	5	2	5	3	1	2	2	254
2	(São Paulo (state)) José Augusto Dias	4	2	Wth	Wth	3	RET	3	6	3	3	2	1	1	2	9	4	10	7	228
3	(São Paulo (state)) Giuliano Losacco	1	1	8	NL	1	RET	2	RET	1	2	5	6	9	3	7	9	1	RET	225
4	(Santa Catarina (state)) Danilo Alamini	RET	RET	7	3	4	2	7	3	9	6	4	3	3	1	RET	NL	5	1	206
5	(São Paulo (state)) Evandro Camargo	3	4	9	2	RET	3	5	2			3	4	4	9	10	RET	6	3	179
6	(São Paulo (state)) Daniel Kelemen	5	RET	RET	5	8	6	6	5	7	9	RET	9	7	4	1	7	9	6	178
7	(São Paulo (state)) Djalma Pivetta	6	5	4	RET	6	5	RET	RET	8	5	6	7	5	6	6	8	7	4	177
8	(São Paulo (state)) Glauco Barros	7	6	6	4	5	4	4	4	6	7	8	8	8	7	11	RET	8	RET	174
9	(São Paulo (state)) Fábio Fogaça	RET	NL	2	RET	7	NL	9	RET	2	1	1	2	6	RET	RET	NL	3	RET	152
10	(Mato Grosso) Pedro Paulo Fernandes	RET	NL	1	1	RET	NL	RET	RET	4	8	9	NL	RET	RET	5	2	4	RET	122
11	(São Paulo (state)) Ricardo Alvarez			5	6	10	7	8	7			RET	10	10	8	8	6	RET	RET	112
12	(São Paulo (state)) Rodrigo Pimenta	RET	RET	RET	NL	9	RET	10	8			7	RET	NL	RET	2	3	12	RET	84
13	(São Paulo (state)) Raphael Abbate															4	5			27
14	(Pernambuco) Sérgio Ramalho									5	4									27
15	(Paraná (state)) Rodrigo Taborda																	11	5	20
16	(Rio Grande do Sul) Maicon Roncen	RET	NL	RET	NL															0
17	(São Paulo (state)) Luciano Burti									RET	RET									0
18	(Pernambuco) Carlos Machado	DSQ	DSQ																	0
Pos	Driver	(Goiás) GOI		(São Paulo (state)) INT		(Paraná (state)) CAS		(Paraná (state)) CAS		(Rio Grande do Sul) TAR		(Paraná (state)) CTB		(Paraná (state)) CTB		(Minas Gerais) POT		(Paraná (state)) CTB		Pts

=== Constructors' Championship standings ===
Pos	Constructor	(Goiás) GOI		(São Paulo (state)) INT		(Paraná (state)) CAS		(Paraná (state)) CAS		(Rio Grande do Sul) TAR		(Paraná (state)) CTB		(Paraná (state)) CTB		(Minas Gerais) POT		(Paraná (state)) CTB		Pts
1	(Germany) Mercedes-Benz	2	1	1	4	1	1	1	1	1	2	3	2	1	1	3	1	2	4	593
1	(Germany) Mercedes-Benz	3	2	6	5	2	5	2	6	2	5	7	3	3	8	7	3	3	5	593
2	(Germany) Volkswagen	9	4	2	1	4	3	3	3	3	3	1	1	4	3	2	2	1	1	513
2	(Germany) Volkswagen	RET	DSQ	3	2	5	4	4	4	11	8	4	5	8	5	4	5	5	3	513
3	(Italy) Iveco	1	5	4	3	7	2	8	5	4	9	2	4	2	2	1	7	6	2	423
3	(Italy) Iveco	5	6	10	10	8	7	9	10	17	11	9	12	6	10	13	8	10	9	423
4	(Brazil) Reman Brasil	6	RET	12	8	11	10	13	11	10	14	RET	7	5	7	6	4	RET	RET	106
5	(Brazil) Protótipo	RET	RET	9	RET	18	RET	22	20	6	4	5	8	11	RET	11	11	12	RET	96
5	(Brazil) Protótipo	RET	RET	RET	NL	20	RET	23	RET	13	12	12	RET	RET	RET	RET	13	22	RET	96
6	(Germany) MAN SE	RET	RET	18	14	14	11	20	15	21	18	8	9	7	4	RET	NL	14	7	73
7	(Sweden) Volvo	RET	NL	RET	NL	RET	RET	7	2	8	1	RET	NL	RET	15			21	15	61
8	(Sweden) Scania			14	17	21	17	21	19			RET	17	17	14	19	14	23	17	10
Pos	Constructor	(Goiás) GOI		(São Paulo (state)) INT		(Paraná (state)) CAS		(Paraná (state)) CAS		(Rio Grande do Sul) TAR		(Paraná (state)) CTB		(Paraná (state)) CTB		(Minas Gerais) POT		(Paraná (state)) CTB		Pts

=== Points standings ===
Points	1°	2°	3°	4°	5°	6°	7°	8°	9°	10°	11°	12°	13°	14°	15°
Race 1	22	20	18	16	15	14	13	12	11	10	9	8	7	6	5
Race 2	18	16	14	12	11	10	9	8	7	6	5	4	3	2	1

== See also ==
- 2021 Stock Car Brasil Championship
- Stock Light
- Brasileiro de Marcas
- Moto 1000 GP
- SuperBike Brasil
- Fórmula Truck
