= 2022 Copa Truck season =

Truck racing competition

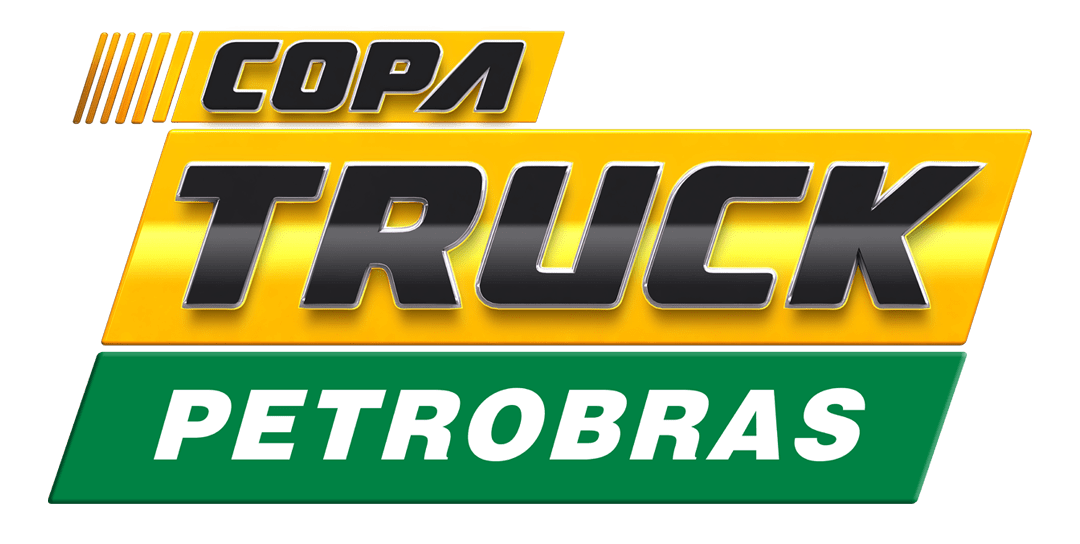
Official Logo

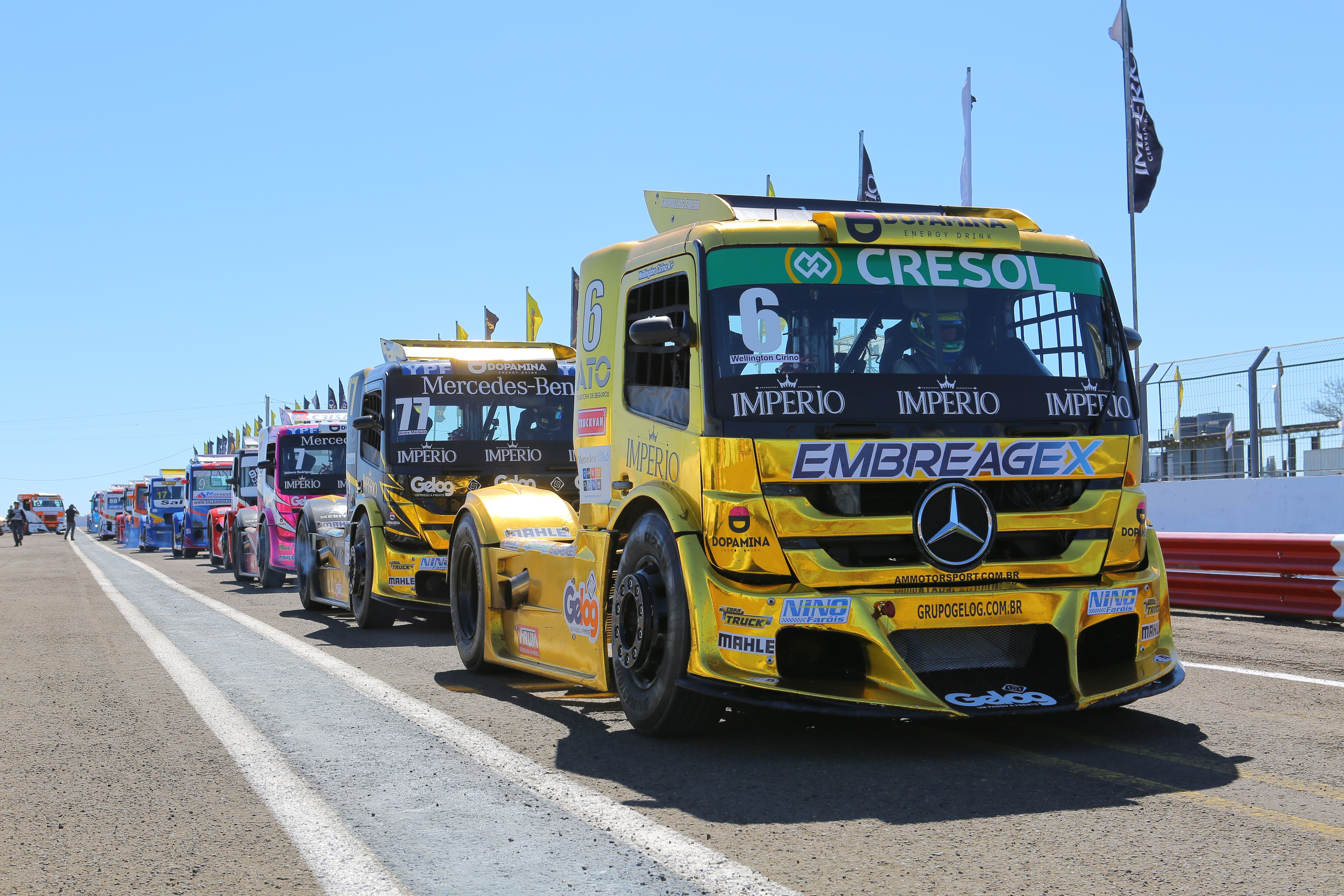
Copa Truck event

The 2022 Brazilian Truck Cup Championship was the sixth season of the Copa Truck. Defending Champion André Marques sat out half the season and could not repeat. So, Wellington Cirino on board a Mercedes-Benz from ASG Motorsport became the 2022 Copa Truck Champion, after narrowly beating out all other former Copa Truck Champions at the top of the standings. Danilo Alamini edged out the prior Super Class Champion for his title in the 2022 season.

The category's origins came after nine teams left Formula Truck due to disagreements with the problematic management of Neusa Navarro Félix. These teams joined in an association to create the category that replaced Formula Truck. The new category brings together teams and drivers from the old category.

In November 2017, it was approved by the Brazilian Automobile Confederation (CBA) and recognized as an official championship. Carlos Col, former head of the Stock Car Pro Series, is its promoter.

The Truck Cup was officially launched on April 27, 2017, in São Paulo. In the first season, the championship was divided into three regional cups: Midwest, Northeast, and Southeast. The first stage took place on May 28, in Goiânia, with 17 trucks on the grid.

The association is made up of the following teams: RM Competições, AJ5 Sports, DF Motorsport, RVR Motorsports, Dakar Motors, Fábio Fogaça Motorsports, Lucar Motorsports and Clay Truck Racing.

== Calendar ==
=== Schedule ===
| Round | Date | Grand Prix | Circuit | City | Hours | Info |
|---|---|---|---|---|---|---|
| 1 | March 12 | (Rio Grande do Sul) Grande Prêmio de Santa Cruz do Sul | Autódromo Internacional de Santa Cruz do Sul | Santa Cruz do Sul, RS | 12h40 | |
| 2 | March 13 | (Rio Grande do Sul) Grande Prêmio de Santa Cruz do Sul | Autódromo Internacional de Santa Cruz do Sul | Santa Cruz do Sul, RS | 13h55 | |
| 3 | May 1 | (São Paulo (state)) Grande Prêmio de São Paulo | Autódromo Internacional de Interlagos | São Paulo, SP | 13h38 | |
| 4 | June 5 | Grande Prêmio de Goiás | Autódromo Ayrton Senna | Goiânia, GO | 12h10 | |
| 5 | July 10 | (Paraná (state)) Grande Prêmio do Paraná | Autódromo Internacional Ayrton Senna | Londrina, PR | 13h10 | |
| 6 | August 21 | (São Paulo (state)) Grande Prêmio de São Paulo | Autódromo Internacional de Interlagos | São Paulo, SP | 13h38 | |
| 7 | September 17 | (Rio Grande do Sul) Grande Prêmio de Tarumã | Autódromo de Tarumã | Viamão, RS | 15h05 | |
| 8 | September 18 | (Rio Grande do Sul) Grande Prêmio de Tarumã | Autódromo de Tarumã | Viamão, RS | 14h00 | |
| 9 | November 6 | (Goiás) Grande Prêmio de Goiânia | Autódromo Ayrton Senna | Goiânia, GO | 11h42 | |

=== Results ===
| Round | Circuit | Date | Pole position | Fastest lap | Winning driver | Winning team | Constructor | Ref. |
|---|---|---|---|---|---|---|---|---|
| 1 | (Rio Grande do Sul) Grande Prêmio de Santa Cruz do Sul | March 12 | (Pernambuco) Beto Monteiro | (Paraná (state)) Wellington Cirino | (Paraná (state)) Wellington Cirino | (Brazil) ASG Motorsport | Mercedes-Benz | |
| 1 | (Rio Grande do Sul) Grande Prêmio de Santa Cruz do Sul | March 12 | No dispute | (Pernambuco) Beto Monteiro | (São Paulo (state)) Paulo Salustiano | (Brazil) R9 Competições | Volkswagen | |
| 2 | (Rio Grande do Sul) Grande Prêmio de Santa Cruz do Sul | March 13 | (São Paulo (state)) Paulo Salustiano | (São Paulo (state)) Roberval Andrade | (São Paulo (state)) Roberval Andrade | (Brazil) ASG Motorsport | Mercedes-Benz | |
| 2 | (Rio Grande do Sul) Grande Prêmio de Santa Cruz do Sul | March 13 | No dispute | (São Paulo (state)) Felipe Giaffone | (Paraná (state)) Wellington Cirino | (Brazil) ASG Motorsport | Mercedes-Benz | |
| 3 | (São Paulo (state)) Grande Prêmio de São Paulo | May 1 | (São Paulo (state)) Felipe Giaffone | (Pernambuco) Beto Monteiro | (Pernambuco) Beto Monteiro | (Brazil) R9 Competições | Volkswagen | |
| 3 | (São Paulo (state)) Grande Prêmio de São Paulo | May 1 | No dispute | (Pernambuco) Beto Monteiro | (Paraná (state)) Wellington Cirino | (Brazil) ASG Motorsport | Mercedes-Benz | |
| 4 | Grande Prêmio de Goiás | June 5 | (São Paulo (state)) Felipe Giaffone | (Pernambuco) Beto Monteiro | (São Paulo (state)) Felipe Giaffone | (Brazil) Usual Iveco Racing | Iveco | |
| 4 | Grande Prêmio de Goiás | June 5 | No dispute | (Pernambuco) Beto Monteiro | (Paraná (state)) Wellington Cirino | (Brazil) ASG Motorsport | Mercedes-Benz | |
| 5 | (Paraná (state)) Grande Prêmio do Paraná | July 10 | (Paraná (state)) Wellington Cirino | (Paraná (state)) Wellington Cirino | (Paraná (state)) Wellington Cirino | (Brazil) ASG Motorsport | Mercedes-Benz | |
| 5 | (Paraná (state)) Grande Prêmio do Paraná | July 10 | No dispute | (Pernambuco) Beto Monteiro | (São Paulo (state)) Paulo Salustiano | (Brazil) R9 Competições | Volkswagen | |
| 6 | (São Paulo (state)) Grande Prêmio de São Paulo | August 21 | (São Paulo (state)) Felipe Giaffone | (São Paulo (state)) Felipe Giaffone | (Pernambuco) Beto Monteiro | (Brazil) R9 Competições | Volkswagen | |
| 6 | (São Paulo (state)) Grande Prêmio de São Paulo | August 21 | No dispute | (São Paulo (state)) Roberval Andrade | (São Paulo (state)) Roberval Andrade | (Brazil) ASG Motorsport | Mercedes-Benz | |
| 7 | (Rio Grande do Sul) Grande Prêmio de Tarumã | September 17 | (Paraná (state)) Wellington Cirino | (Paraná (state)) Wellington Cirino | (Paraná (state)) Wellington Cirino | (Brazil) ASG Motorsport | Mercedes-Benz | |
| 7 | (Rio Grande do Sul) Grande Prêmio de Tarumã | September 17 | No dispute | (São Paulo (state)) André Marques | (São Paulo (state)) Roberval Andrade | (Brazil) ASG Motorsport | Mercedes-Benz | |
| 8 | (Rio Grande do Sul) Grande Prêmio de Tarumã | September 18 | (São Paulo (state)) Roberval Andrade | (São Paulo (state)) Roberval Andrade | (São Paulo (state)) Roberval Andrade | (Brazil) ASG Motorsport | Mercedes-Benz | |
| 8 | (Rio Grande do Sul) Grande Prêmio de Tarumã | September 18 | No dispute | (São Paulo (state)) Roberval Andrade | (Pernambuco) Beto Monteiro | (Brazil) R9 Competições | Volkswagen | |
| 9 | (Goiás) Grande Prêmio de Goiânia | November 6 | (São Paulo (state)) Roberval Andrade | (São Paulo (state)) Roberval Andrade | (São Paulo (state)) Roberval Andrade | (Brazil) ASG Motorsport | Mercedes-Benz | |
| 9 | (Goiás) Grande Prêmio de Goiânia | November 6 | No dispute | (São Paulo (state)) André Marques | (São Paulo (state)) André Marques | (Brazil) R9 Competições | Volkswagen | |

== Championship standings ==
=== Pro Category ===
| Pos | Driver | (Rio Grande do Sul) SCZ | | (Rio Grande do Sul) SCZ | | (São Paulo (state)) INT | | (Goiás) GOI | | (Paraná (state)) LON | | (São Paulo (state)) INT | | (Rio Grande do Sul) TAR | | (Rio Grande do Sul) TAR | | (Goiás) GOI | | Pts |
| Pos | Driver | RD1 | RD2 | RD1 | RD2 | RD1 | RD2 | RD1 | RD2 | RD1 | RD2 | RD1 | RD2 | RD1 | RD2 | RD1 | RD2 | RD1 | RD2 | Pts |
|---|---|---|---|---|---|---|---|---|---|---|---|---|---|---|---|---|---|---|---|---|
| 1 | (Paraná (state)) Wellington Cirino | 1 | 4 | 5 | 1 | 4 | 1 | 6 | 1 | 1 | 7 | 7 | 8 | 1 | 5 | 2 | 5 | 17 | 5 | 255 |
| 2 | (São Paulo (state)) Felipe Giaffone | 3 | 11 | 6 | 5 | 2 | 3 | 1 | 5 | 9 | 6 | 2 | 3 | 2 | 3 | 4 | 3 | 5 | 3 | 252 |
| 3 | (Pernambuco) Beto Monteiro | 2 | 8 | 2 | 2 | 1 | 4 | 2 | 2 | 16 | 8 | 1 | 4 | 9 | 6 | 6 | 1 | 2 | DSQ | 249 |
| 4 | (São Paulo (state)) Roberval Andrade | 4 | RET | 1 | RET | 3 | RET | 3 | 6 | 2 | 2 | 4 | 1 | 7 | 1 | 1 | 2 | 1 | RET | 246 |
| 5 | (São Paulo (state)) Paulo Salustiano | 5 | 1 | 3 | 3 | DSQ | 18 | 4 | 3 | 3 | 1 | 3 | RET | 3 | 7 | 5 | RET | 3 | RET | 217 |
| 6 | (Paraná (state)) Débora Rodrigues | 8 | 3 | 8 | 11 | 6 | 8 | 5 | 4 | 5 | 5 | 5 | 15 | 13 | 10 | 16 | 14 | 12 | 16 | 190 |
| 7 | (Paraná (state)) Jaidson Zini | RET | 13 | 14 | 6 | 5 | RET | 9 | 11 | 8 | 3 | 18 | 14 | 6 | 13 | 8 | 8 | 6 | 4 | 181 |
| 8 | (São Paulo (state)) André Marques | | | | | | | | | 4 | 4 | 8 | 2 | 4 | 2 | 3 | 4 | 4 | 1 | 153 |
| 9 | (São Paulo (state)) Luiz Lopes | 12 | 9 | 9 | 16 | DSQ | 5 | 14 | RET | 19 | 16 | RET | NL | 11 | 9 | 14 | 7 | 21 | 10 | 143 |
| 10 | (Santa Catarina (state)) Danilo Alamini | 13 | 10 | 16 | 4 | 7 | 2 | 8 | 7 | 11 | 10 | RET | NL | 8 | 4 | 10 | 11 | 10 | 17 | 139 |
| 11 | (Santa Catarina (state)) Felipe Tozzo | 10 | RET | RET | NL | 9 | 6 | 12 | 9 | 12 | 14 | 15 | 17 | 5 | 8 | 7 | 10 | 14 | 7 | 118 |
| 12 | (São Paulo (state)) Adalberto Jardim | RET | 12 | 7 | 17 | 13 | 17 | 18 | 13 | 6 | RET | RET | NL | DNQ | RET | RET | RET | 7 | 2 | 111 |
| 13 | (São Paulo (state)) Raphael Abbate | 6 | 6 | 11 | 7 | 17 | 7 | NL | NL | 10 | 12 | 16 | 9 | 18 | NL | 13 | 12 | 9 | 8 | 102 |
| 14 | (São Paulo (state)) Evandro Camargo | 9 | 7 | 12 | 13 | RET | NL | RET | NL | 7 | 11 | 12 | 7 | 16 | 12 | 15 | RET | 8 | 12 | 91 |
| 15 | (São Paulo (state)) Djalma Fogaça | 18 | NL | 10 | 14 | RET | 11 | RET | NL | RET | 17 | 13 | 6 | 15 | RET | RET | NL | 11 | RET | 90 |
| 16 | (São Paulo (state)) José Augusto Dias | 15 | RET | 20 | 9 | 8 | 10 | 11 | 10 | 13 | 9 | 6 | 5 | | | | | | | 84 |
| 17 | (São Paulo (state)) Fábio Fogaça | 19 | 16 | 15 | 8 | 18 | 9 | 7 | 8 | DSQ | DSQ | 9 | 11 | 14 | 21 | 9 | 6 | RET | RET | 84 |
| 18 | (São Paulo (state)) Danilo Dirani | RET | NL | 13 | RET | DSQ | 15 | 19 | 17 | RET | NL | RET | NL | | | 22 | 18 | RET | 15 | 64 |
| 19 | (Rio Grande do Sul) Régis Boéssio | 7 | 2 | 4 | RET | | | | | | | RET | NL | 12 | 20 | RET | NL | | | 62 |
| 20 | (Mato Grosso) Pedro Paulo Fernandes | 14 | 5 | RET | RET | 12 | 16 | RET | NL | 17 | RET | 10 | RET | 10 | 19 | 11 | NL | 19 | 13 | 57 |
| 21 | (São Paulo (state)) Daniel Keleman | | | | | 10 | 12 | 15 | 15 | 14 | 18 | 14 | 12 | 17 | 15 | 12 | 9 | RET | RET | 52 |
| 22 | (São Paulo (state)) Djalma Pivetta | RET | NL | 17 | 10 | 19 | NL | 10 | 12 | 20 | 13 | 11 | 10 | 19 | 22 | 18 | 15 | 18 | 14 | 41 |
| 23 | (Paraná (state)) Rodrigo Taborda | 17 | 14 | 18 | 15 | 14 | 13 | RET | NL | 15 | 15 | RET | NL | 24 | 14 | RET | NL | 15 | 9 | 40 |
| 24 | (São Paulo (state)) Renato Martins | | | | | | | | | | | | 21 | 18 | 19 | 17 | | | | 31 |
| 25 | (Rio de Janeiro (state)) Thiago Rizzo | | | | | | | | | | | 17 | 18 | 22 | 11 | 17 | 13 | 13 | 6 | 25 |
| 26 | (São Paulo (state)) Pe Jota | 20 | NL | NL | NL | 16 | RET | 13 | 14 | RET | NL | 21 | 13 | 20 | 16 | 21 | 16 | 16 | 11 | 17 |
| 27 | (São Paulo (state)) Glauco Barros | 16 | 15 | 21 | 12 | 15 | 14 | 17 | RET | | | 20 | 16 | 23 | 17 | 20 | 19 | | | 12 |
| 28 | (Paraná (state)) Leandro Totti | | | | | | | | | | | | | | | | | 20 | RET | 9 |
| 29 | (São Paulo (state)) Alex Fabiano da Silva | | | | | 11 | DSQ | 16 | 16 | 18 | RET | | | | | | | | | 9 |
| 30 | (Rio Grande do Sul) Fabiano Cardoso | 11 | RET | NL | NL | | | | | | | | | | | | | | | 9 |
| 31 | (São Paulo (state)) Kléber Barcellos Elétric | | | | | | | | | | | 19 | 19 | 25 | RET | RET | NL | NL | RET | 0 |
| 32 | (São Paulo (state)) Ricardo Alvarez | RET | NL | 19 | RET | | | | | | | | | | | | | | | 0 |
| Pos | Driver | (Rio Grande do Sul) SCZ | | (Rio Grande do Sul) SCZ | | (São Paulo (state)) INT | | (Goiás) GOI | | (Paraná (state)) LON | | (São Paulo (state)) INT | | (Rio Grande do Sul) TAR | | (Rio Grande do Sul) TAR | | (Goiás) GOI | | Pts |

| Color | Result |
|---|---|
| Gold | Winner |
| Silver | 2nd-place finish |
| Bronze | 3rd-place finish |
| Green | Top 5 finish |
| Light Blue | Top 10 finish |
| Dark Blue | Other flagged position |
| Purple | Did not finish |
| Red | Did not qualify (DNQ) |
| Brown | Withdrew (Wth) |
| Black | Disqualified (DSQ) |
| White | Did Not Start (DNS) |
| White | Race abandoned (C) |
| Blank | Did not participate |

=== Categoría Super ===
| Pos | Driver | (Rio Grande do Sul) SCZ | | (Rio Grande do Sul) SCZ | | (São Paulo (state)) INT | | (Goiás) GOI | | (Paraná (state)) LON | | (São Paulo (state)) INT | | (Rio Grande do Sul) TAR | | (Rio Grande do Sul) TAR | | (Federal District (Brazil)) BRA | | Pts |
| Pos | Driver | RD1 | RD2 | RD1 | RD2 | RD1 | RD2 | RD1 | RD2 | RD1 | RD2 | RD1 | RD2 | RD1 | RD2 | RD1 | RD2 | RD1 | RD2 | Pts |
|---|---|---|---|---|---|---|---|---|---|---|---|---|---|---|---|---|---|---|---|---|
| 1 | (Santa Catarina (state)) Danilo Alamini | 5 | 4 | 4 | 1 | 1 | 1 | 2 | 1 | 3 | 2 | RET | NL | 2 | 1 | 3 | 4 | 3 | 9 | 268 |
| 2 | (Santa Catarina (state)) Felipe Tozzo | 3 | RET | RET | NL | 3 | 2 | 5 | 5 | 4 | 6 | 7 | 9 | 1 | 2 | 1 | 3 | 5 | 2 | 232 |
| 3 | (São Paulo (state)) Raphael Abbate | 1 | 2 | 1 | 2 | 10 | 3 | NL | NL | 2 | 4 | 8 | 3 | 7 | NL | 6 | 5 | 2 | 3 | 230 |
| 4 | (São Paulo (state)) Evandro Camargo | 2 | 3 | 2 | 7 | RET | NL | RET | NL | 1 | 3 | 5 | 2 | 5 | 4 | 7 | RET | 1 | 6 | 202 |
| 5 | (São Paulo (state)) Fábio Fogaça | 10 | 7 | 3 | 3 | 11 | 4 | 1 | 2 | DSQ | DSQ | 2 | 5 | 4 | 10 | 2 | 1 | RET | RET | 184 |
| 6 | (São Paulo (state)) José Augusto Dias | 7 | RET | 8 | 4 | 2 | 5 | 4 | 3 | 5 | 1 | 1 | 1 | | | | | | | 169 |
| 7 | (São Paulo (state)) Djalma Pivetta | RET | NL | 5 | 5 | 12 | NL | 3 | 4 | 10 | 5 | 4 | 4 | 8 | 11 | 9 | 7 | 8 | 8 | 169 |
| 8 | (Mato Grosso) Pedro Paulo Fernandes | 6 | 1 | RET | RET | 6 | 9 | RET | NL | 8 | RET | 3 | RET | 3 | 9 | 4 | NL | 9 | 7 | 151 |
| 9 | (São Paulo (state)) Daniel Keleman | | | | | 4 | 6 | 7 | 7 | 6 | 8 | 6 | 6 | 6 | 6 | 5 | 2 | RET | RET | 149 |
| 10 | (Paraná (state)) Rodrigo Taborda | 9 | 5 | 6 | 8 | 7 | 7 | RET | NL | 7 | 7 | RET | NL | 12 | 5 | RET | NL | 6 | 4 | 133 |
| 11 | (São Paulo (state)) Glauco Barros | 8 | 6 | 9 | 6 | 8 | 8 | 9 | RET | | | 11 | 8 | 11 | 8 | 10 | 9 | | | 125 |
| 12 | (São Paulo (state)) Pe Jota | 11 | NL | NL | NL | 9 | RET | 6 | 6 | RET | NL | 12 | 7 | 9 | 7 | 11 | 8 | 7 | 5 | 122 |
| 13 | (Rio de Janeiro (state)) Thiago Rizzo | | | | | | | | | | | 9 | 10 | 10 | 3 | 8 | 5 | 4 | 1 | 97 |
| 14 | (São Paulo (state)) Alex Fabiano da Silva | | | | | 5 | DSQ | 8 | 8 | 9 | RET | | | | | | | | | 46 |
| 15 | (São Paulo (state)) Kléber Barcellos Elétric | | | | | | | | | | | 10 | 11 | 13 | RET | RET | NL | NL | RET | 22 |
| 16 | (Rio Grande do Sul) Fabiano Cardoso | 4 | RET | NL | NL | | | | | | | | | | | | | | | 16 |
| 17 | (São Paulo (state)) Ricardo Alvarez | RET | NL | 7 | RET | | | | | | | | | | | | | | | 13 |
| Pos | Driver | (Rio Grande do Sul) SCZ | | (Rio Grande do Sul) SCZ | | (São Paulo (state)) INT | | (Goiás) GOI | | (Paraná (state)) LON | | (São Paulo (state)) INT | | (Rio Grande do Sul) TAR | | (Rio Grande do Sul) TAR | | (Federal District (Brazil)) BRA | | Pts |

=== Constructors' Championship standings ===
| Pos | Constructor | (Rio Grande do Sul) SCZ | | (Rio Grande do Sul) SCZ | | (São Paulo (state)) INT | | (Goiás) GOI | | (Paraná (state)) LON | | (São Paulo (state)) INT | | (Rio Grande do Sul) TAR | | (Rio Grande do Sul) TAR | | (Goiás) GOI | | Pts |
| Pos | Constructor | RD1 | RD2 | RD1 | RD2 | RD1 | RD2 | RD1 | RD2 | RD1 | RD2 | RD1 | RD2 | RD1 | RD2 | RD1 | RD2 | RD1 | RD2 | Pts |
|---|---|---|---|---|---|---|---|---|---|---|---|---|---|---|---|---|---|---|---|---|
| 1 | (Germany) Volkswagen | 2 | 3 | 2 | 2 | 1 | 2 | 2 | 2 | 3 | 1 | 1 | 2 | 3 | 2 | 3 | 1 | 2 | 1 | 588 |
| 1 | (Germany) Volkswagen | 5 | 8 | 3 | 3 | 6 | 4 | 4 | 3 | 4 | 4 | 3 | 4 | 4 | 4 | 5 | 4 | 3 | 6 | 588 |
| 2 | (Germany) Mercedes-Benz | 1 | 1 | 1 | 1 | 3 | 1 | 3 | 1 | 1 | 2 | 4 | 1 | 1 | 1 | 1 | 2 | 1 | 2 | 576 |
| 2 | (Germany) Mercedes-Benz | 4 | 4 | 5 | 6 | 4 | 5 | 6 | 6 | 2 | 3 | 7 | 6 | 6 | 5 | 2 | 5 | 6 | 4 | 576 |
| 3 | (Italy) Iveco | 3 | 6 | 7 | 5 | 2 | 3 | 1 | 5 | 9 | 6 | 2 | 3 | 2 | 3 | 4 | 3 | 5 | 3 | 435 |
| 3 | (Italy) Iveco | 6 | 11 | 11 | 7 | 9 | 6 | 10 | 9 | 10 | 12 | 11 | 9 | 5 | 8 | 13 | 10 | 9 | 7 | 435 |
| 4 | (Sweden) Volvo | 7 | 2 | 4 | 15 | 14 | 13 | RET | RET | 15 | 15 | RET | NL | 12 | 14 | RET | NL | 15 | 9 | 79 |
| 4 | (Sweden) Volvo | 17 | 14 | 18 | RET | | | | | | | RET | NL | 24 | 20 | RET | NL | | | 79 |
| 5 | (Sweden) Scania | RET | NL | 19 | RET | 15 | 14 | 17 | RET | | | 19 | 19 | 25 | RET | RET | NL | NL | RET | 7 |
| Pos | Constructor | (Rio Grande do Sul) SCZ | | (Rio Grande do Sul) SCZ | | (São Paulo (state)) INT | | (Goiás) GOI | | (Paraná (state)) LON | | (São Paulo (state)) INT | | (Rio Grande do Sul) TAR | | (Rio Grande do Sul) TAR | | (Goiás) GOI | | Pts |

=== Points standings ===
| Points | 1° | 2° | 3° | 4° | 5° | 6° | 7° | 8° | 9° | 10° | 11° | 12° | 13° | 14° | 15° |
|---|---|---|---|---|---|---|---|---|---|---|---|---|---|---|---|
| Race 1 | 22 | 20 | 18 | 16 | 15 | 14 | 13 | 12 | 11 | 10 | 9 | 8 | 7 | 6 | 5 |
| Race 2 | 18 | 16 | 14 | 12 | 11 | 10 | 9 | 8 | 7 | 6 | 5 | 4 | 3 | 2 | 1 |

== See also ==
- 2022 Stock Car Pro Series
- Stock Light
- Brasileiro de Marcas
- Moto 1000 GP
- SuperBike Brasil
- Fórmula Truck
