= 2024 Copa Truck season =

Truck racing competition

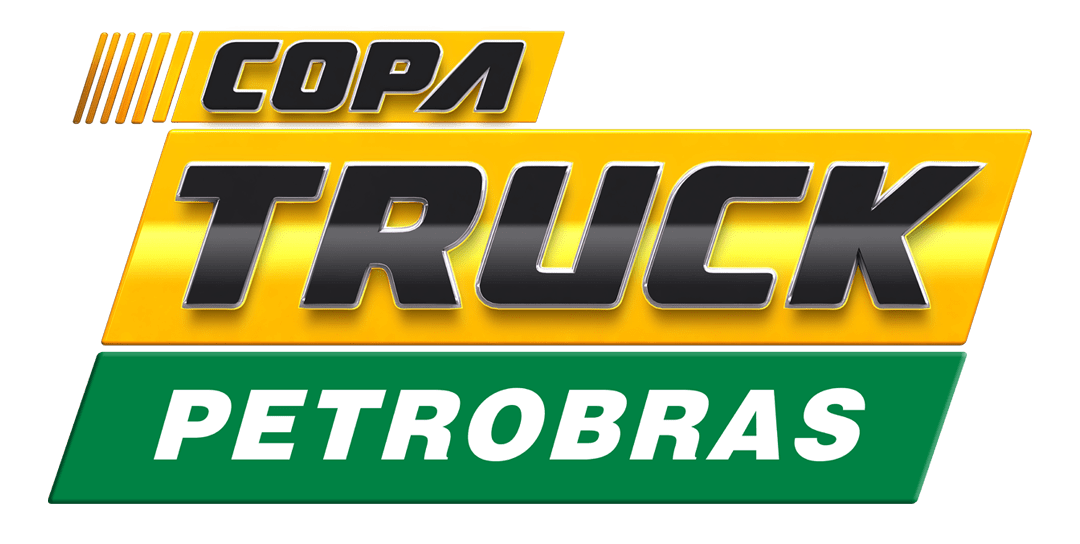
Official Logo

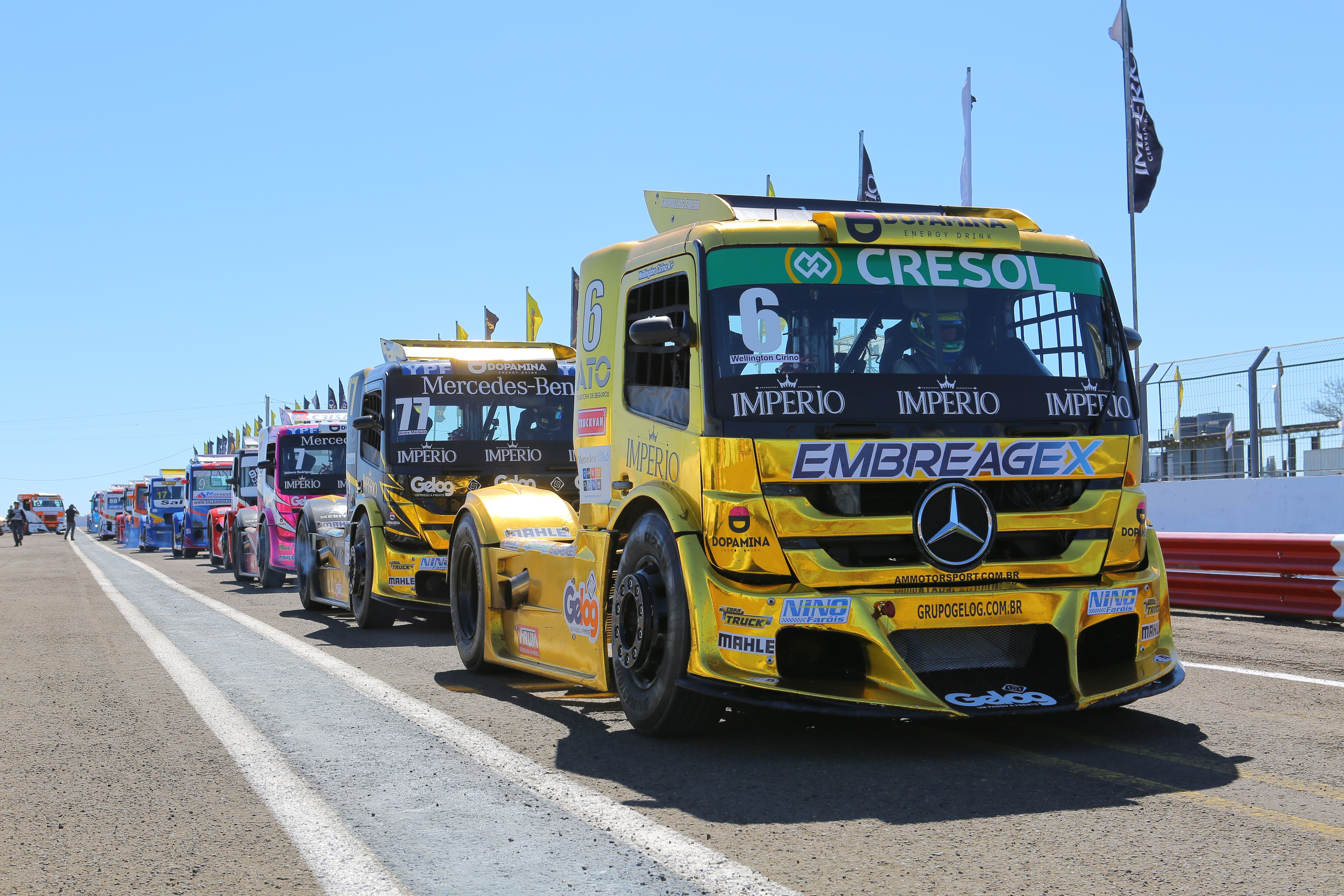
Copa Truck event

The 2024 Brazilian Truck Cup Championship is the eighth season of the Copa Truck. Defending Champion Felipe Giaffone in a Volkswagen from R9 Competições repeated as the Copa Truck Pro Champion in 2024, after claiming his third Copa Truck title after 2017 and 2023. In the Super Truck Elite Class Bia Figueiredo claimed this year's title win. Prometeon took over Official Supply Duty from Goodyear for the Series going forward.

The category's origins came after nine teams left Formula Truck due to disagreements with the problematic management of Neusa Navarro Félix. These teams joined in an association to create the category that replaced Formula Truck. The new category brings together teams and drivers from the old category.

In November 2017, it was approved by the Brazilian Automobile Confederation (CBA) and recognized as an official championship. Carlos Col, former head of the Stock Car Pro Series, is its promoter.

The Truck Cup was officially launched on April 27, 2017, in São Paulo. In the first season, the championship was divided into three regional cups: Midwest, Northeast, and Southeast. The first stage took place on May 28, in Goiânia, with 17 trucks on the grid.

The association is made up of the following teams: RM Competições, AJ5 Sports, DF Motorsport, RVR Motorsports, Dakar Motors, Fábio Fogaça Motorsports, Lucar Motorsports and Clay Truck Racing.

== Calendar ==
=== Schedule ===
Round	Date	Grand Prix	Circuit	City	Hours	Info
1	March 17	(Mato Grosso do Sul) Grande Prêmio de Campo Grande	Autódromo Internacional Orlando Moura	Campo Grande, MS	12h30	
2	April 14	Grande Prêmio de Goiás	Autódromo Ayrton Senna	Goiânia, GO	12h30	
3	May 12	(Paraná (state)) Grande Prêmio de Londrina	Autódromo Internacional de Londrina	Londrina, PR	12h30	
4	June 16	(Minas Gerais) Grande Prêmio Santa Cruz do Sul	Autódromo Internacional Potenza	Lima Duarte, MG	12h30	
5	August 4	(São Paulo (state)) Grande Prêmio de Interlagos	Autódromo Internacional de Interlagos	São Paulo, SP	12h30	
6	September 1	(Paraná (state)) Grande Prêmio de Cascavel	Autódromo Zilmar Beux	Cascavel, PR	14h00	
7	October 13	(Rio Grande do Sul) Grande Prêmio de Tarumã	Autódromo de Tarumã	Viamão, RS	12h30	
8	November 17	Grande Prêmio de Minas Gerais	Circuito dos Cristais	Curvelo, MG		
9	December 8	(Goiás) Grande Prêmio de Goiânia	Autódromo Ayrton Senna	Goiânia, GO		
Race canceled due to 2024 Rio Grande do Sul floods						
-	June 16	(Rio Grande do Sul) Grande Prêmio de Santa Cruz do Sul	Autódromo Internacional de Santa Cruz do Sul	Santa Cruz do Sul, RS	Cancelada	

=== Results ===
Round	Circuit	Date	Pole position	Fastest lap	Winning driver	Winning team	Constructor	Ref.
1	(Mato Grosso do Sul) Grande Prêmio de Campo Grande	March 17	(São Paulo (state)) Danilo Dirani	(São Paulo (state)) Felipe Giaffone	(São Paulo (state)) Felipe Giaffone	(Brazil) R9 Competições	(Germany) Volkswagen	
1	(Mato Grosso do Sul) Grande Prêmio de Campo Grande	March 17	No dispute	(São Paulo (state)) Roberval Andrade	(Paraná (state)) Wellington Cirino	(Brazil) Usual Racing	(Italy) Iveco	
2	Grande Prêmio de Goiás	April 14	(São Paulo (state)) Felipe Giaffone	(São Paulo (state)) Roberval Andrade	(São Paulo (state)) Roberval Andrade	(Brazil) ASG Motorsport	(Germany) Mercedes-Benz	
2	Grande Prêmio de Goiás	April 14	No dispute	(São Paulo (state)) Fábio Fogaça	(São Paulo (state)) Fábio Fogaça	(Brazil) FF Motorsport	(Germany) Mercedes-Benz	
3	(Paraná (state)) Grande Prêmio de Londrina	May 12	(Pernambuco) Beto Monteiro	(Pernambuco) Beto Monteiro	(Pernambuco) Beto Monteiro	(Brazil) R9 Competições	(Germany) Volkswagen	
3	(Paraná (state)) Grande Prêmio de Londrina	May 12	No dispute	(São Paulo (state)) Paulo Salustiano	(São Paulo (state)) Paulo Salustiano	(Brazil) Odapel/R9 Racing	(Germany) Volkswagen	
4	(Minas Gerais) Grande Prêmio de Santa Cruz do Sul	June 16	(Paraná (state)) Leandro Totti	(São Paulo (state)) Danilo Dirani	(Paraná (state)) Leandro Totti	(Brazil) Vannucci Racing	(Italy) Iveco	
4	(Minas Gerais) Grande Prêmio de Santa Cruz do Sul	June 16	No dispute	(Paraná (state)) Leandro Totti	(São Paulo (state)) Victor Franzoni	(Brazil) Tiger Team	(Germany) Mercedes-Benz	
5	(São Paulo (state)) Grande Prêmio de Interlagos	August 4	(Pernambuco) Beto Monteiro	(Pernambuco) Beto Monteiro	(Pernambuco) Beto Monteiro	(Brazil) R9 Competições	(Germany) Volkswagen	
5	(São Paulo (state)) Grande Prêmio de Interlagos	August 4	No dispute	(São Paulo (state)) Paulo Salustiano	(São Paulo (state)) Paulo Salustiano	(Brazil) Odapel/R9 Racing	(Germany) Volkswagen	
6	(Paraná (state)) Grande Prêmio de Cascavel	September 1	(São Paulo (state)) Felipe Giaffone	(São Paulo (state)) Felipe Giaffone	(São Paulo (state)) Felipe Giaffone	(Brazil) R9 Competições	(Germany) Volkswagen	
6	(Paraná (state)) Grande Prêmio de Cascavel	September 1	No dispute	(Pernambuco) Beto Monteiro	(Pernambuco) Beto Monteiro	(Brazil) R9 Competições	(Germany) Volkswagen	
7	(Rio Grande do Sul) Grande Prêmio de Tarumã	October 13	(Paraná (state)) Leandro Totti	(Paraná (state)) Leandro Totti	(Paraná (state)) Leandro Totti	(Brazil) Vannucci Racing	(Italy) Iveco	
7	(Rio Grande do Sul) Grande Prêmio de Tarumã	October 13	No dispute	(São Paulo (state)) Roberval Andrade	(São Paulo (state)) Danilo Dirani	(Brazil) Usual Racing	(Italy) Iveco	
8	Grande Prêmio de Minas Gerais	November 17	(São Paulo (state)) Felipe Giaffone	(São Paulo (state)) Felipe Giaffone	(São Paulo (state)) Felipe Giaffone	(Brazil) R9 Competições	(Germany) Volkswagen	
8	Grande Prêmio de Minas Gerais	November 17	No dispute	(São Paulo (state)) Bia Figueiredo	(São Paulo (state)) Roberval Andrade	(Brazil) ASG Motorsport	(Germany) Mercedes-Benz	
9	(Goiás) Grande Prêmio de Goiânia	December 8	(São Paulo (state)) Felipe Giaffone	(Paraná (state)) Wellington Cirino	(São Paulo (state)) Felipe Giaffone	(Brazil) R9 Competições	(Germany) Volkswagen	
9	(Goiás) Grande Prêmio de Goiânia	December 8	No dispute	(São Paulo (state)) Danilo Dirani	(São Paulo (state)) André Marques	(Brazil) R9 Competições	(Germany) Volkswagen	

== Championship standings ==
=== Super Truck Pro Category ===
Pos	Driver	(Mato Grosso do Sul) CGR		(Goiás) GOI		(Paraná (state)) LON		(Minas Gerais) POT		(São Paulo (state)) INT		(Paraná (state)) CAS		(Rio Grande do Sul) TAR		(Minas Gerais) MGS		(Goiás) GNA		Pts
Pos	Driver	RD1	RD2	RD1	RD2	RD1	RD2	RD1	RD2	RD1	RD2	RD1	RD2	RD1	RD2	RD1	RD2	RD1	RD2	Pts
1	(São Paulo (state)) Felipe Giaffone	1	3	2	3	3	9	Ret	7	2	16	1	2	2	4	1	6	1	5	271
2	(São Paulo (state)) André Marques	4	2	3	2	9	29	4	4	10	6	2	NL	10	8	6	3	7	1	225
3	(São Paulo (state)) Danilo Dirani	25	27	10	7	5	3	2	3	3	19	3	4	3	1	2	4	WD	6	208
4	(São Paulo (state)) Roberval Andrade	9	18	1	8	2	17	Ret	15	4	2			4	7	4	1	6	2	201
5	(Paraná (state)) Wellington Cirino	6	1	5	6	4	4	11	5	8	21	19	7	5	5	5	5	2	10	194
6	(São Paulo (state)) Raphael Abbate	17	7	7	4	6	NL	7	17	5	3	4	WD	6	9	3	7	4	3	194
7	(São Paulo (state)) Paulo Salustiano	5	26	6	5	8	1	6	2	6	1	17	NC			7	2	5	4	188
8	(Paraná (state)) Jaidson Zini	30	24	13	Ret	7	2	5	20	7	5	10	6	12	11	14	17	3	7	139
9	(Pernambuco) Beto Monteiro	28	WD	9	9	1	13	3	Ret	1	7	5	1	Les	Les					136
10	(São Paulo (state)) Victor Franzoni	3	5	Ret	DNS	11	28	8	1	17	9	6	3	11	10	NQ	NQ	15	Ret	135
11	(Santa Catarina (state)) Felipe Tozzo	7	6	12	11	NC	8	9	Ret	14	23	7	13	7	2	Ret	NL	8	18	120
12	(Paraná (state)) Leandro Totti	8	20	11	25	Ret	NL	1	6	24	24	8	5	1	15	11	8	OUT	Ret	118
13	(São Paulo (state)) Fábio Fogaça	Wth	11	8	1	27	22	10	8	30	12	9	Wth	8	3	30	NA	EX	EX	105
14	(Paraná (state)) Débora Rodrigues	12	9	14	26	10	6	17	10	20	8	12	23	13	16	18	26	12	11	102
15	(São Paulo (state)) Adalberto Jardim	2	17	4	Ret	20	7	Ret	DNF	9	4	29	18	23	13	Ret	DSQ	26	NC	96
16	(São Paulo (state)) Luiz Lopes	10	4	27	10	18	5	13	9	11	26			15	12	13	20	24	NPQ	96
17	(Rio Grande do Sul) Régis Boessio	11	8	NPQ	Ret	Wth	Wth			Ret	DNS	NPQ	DNF	9	6	8	16	10	8	73
18	(São Paulo (state)) Evandro Camargo	13	10	18	13	Ret	Ret	12	11	Ret	DNP			14	NQ	10	AN	9	9	70
19	(Rio de Janeiro (state)) Thiago Rizzo	14	25	26	20	14	10	14	DNQ	33	DNF	13	9	16	NE	Ret	DNS	11	DNS	54
20	(São Paulo (state)) Bia Figueiredo	29	23	15	Ret	12	14	15	14	12	14	11	15	17	20	12	10	DSQ	DSQ	51
21	(Mato Grosso) Pedro Paulo Fernandes					13	19	29	16	13	11	21	8	29	17	9	11	17	19	43
22	(Santa Catarina (state)) Danilo Alamini	31	DNQ	Ret	NC	30	NL	16	24	19	10			AT	14	17	15	Ret	DNQ	32
23	(Paraná (state)) Rodrigo Taborda	15	16	17	12	15	15	18	19	31	18	15	25	24	18	Ret	DNS	19	20	20
24	(Paraná (state)) Pedro Perdoncini	21	14	23	15	16	12	19	18	15	15	Ret	NL	22	23	19	12	27	21	17
25	(Paraná (state)) Lucas Bornemann	26	22	30	23	NC	27	23	12	23	13	20	10	19	19	27	13	20	17	16
26	(São Paulo (state)) Daniel Keleman	20	INF	22	11	22	11	24	NL	25	Ret	24	17	Ret	Ret	24	INF	21	15	15
27	(Bahia) Diogo Moscato											14	14			15	14	INF	NL	15
28	(São Paulo (state)) José Augusto Dias	22	12	16	18	17	24	Ret	NL	Ret	Wth	26	16	21	27	31	27	14	12	14
29	(São Paulo (state)) Djalma Pivetta	18	13	19	16	19	21	26	21	21	17	18	21	27	25	28	18	13	14	12
30	(São Paulo (state)) Ricardo Alvarez	19	28	DSQ	DSQ	21	16	22	13	16	Ret	22	12	25	28	26	21	16	13	10
31	(São Paulo (state)) Alberto Cattucci															16	9			7
32	(Espírito Santo) Hugo Cibien									26	20	16	11	28	21	21	19	NL	DNS	5
33	(São Paulo (state)) Léo Rufino	AT	WD	21	14	25	20	21	Ret	22	27	27	20	18	24	23	25	18	Ret	2
34	(São Paulo (state)) Márcio Giordano	Ret	15	20	19	23	18	28	22	18	28	25	24	20	22	20	24	Wth	NC	1
35	(São Paulo (state)) Kléber Eletric	16	Ret	31	NL	24	NC	20	27	27	22	Ret	NL	DSQ	DSQ	22	Ret	22	DSQ	0
36	(Mato Grosso) Juca Bala	23	21	29	22	28	26	27	25	28	NL	Ret	INF	INF	DNQ	29	23	Ret	16	0
37	(São Paulo (state)) Glauco Barros	24	19	24	17	Ret	INF													0
38	(Rio Grande do Sul) Maicon Roncen	Ret	NL	25	21	26	23	25	23	29	29	23	19	26	26	DNF	Ret	23	Ret	0
39	(Goiás) Gustavo Teixeira											28	22	Ret	NL	Ret	NL	25	Ret	0
40	(São Paulo (state)) Hiro Yano	27	NL	28	24	29	25	Ret	26	32	25									0
41	(São Paulo (state)) Vinícius Palma															25	22	28	INF	0
42	(Rio Grande do Sul) Bernardo Cardoso																	DNS	DNS	0
43	(São Paulo (state)) Renato Martins													AT	AT					0
Pos	Driver	(Mato Grosso do Sul) CGR		(Goiás) GOI		(Paraná (state)) LON		(Minas Gerais) POT		(São Paulo (state)) INT		(Paraná (state)) CAS		(Rio Grande do Sul) TAR		(Minas Gerais) MGS		(Goiás) GNA		Pts

Color	Result
Gold	Winner
Silver	2nd-place finish
Bronze	3rd-place finish
Green	Top 5 finish
Light Blue	Top 10 finish
Dark Blue	Other flagged position
Purple	Did not finish
Red	Did not qualify (DNQ)
Brown	Withdrew (Wth)
Black	Disqualified (DSQ)
White	Did Not Start (DNS)
White	Race abandoned (C)
Blank	Did not participate

=== Categoría Super Truck Elite ===
Pos	Driver	(Mato Grosso do Sul) CGR		(Goiás) GOI		(Paraná (state)) LON		(Minas Gerais) POT		(São Paulo (state)) INT		(Paraná (state)) CAS		(Rio Grande do Sul) TAR		(Minas Gerais) MGS		(Goiás) GNA		Pts
Pos	Driver	RD1	RD2	RD1	RD2	RD1	RD2	RD1	RD2	RD1	RD2	RD1	RD2	RD1	RD2	RD1	RD2	RD1	RD2	Pts
1	(São Paulo (state)) Bia Figueiredo	12	9	1	Ret	1	3	1	3	1	3	1	6	1	4	2	1	DSQ	DSQ	255
2	(Mato Grosso) Pedro Paulo Fernandes					2	7	13	4	2	1	7	1	12	1	1	2	4	7	214
3	(Paraná (state)) Rodrigo Taborda	1	5	3	2	3	4	2	6	14	6	3	14	7	2	Ret	DNS	6	8	210
4	(São Paulo (state)) Djalma Pivetta	3	2	4	5	6	9	10	7	6	5	5	11	10	9	13	6	1	3	208
5	(Paraná (state)) Pedro Perdoncini	6	3	8	4	4	2	3	5	3	4	Ret	NL	6	7	4	3	12	9	200
6	(Paraná (state)) Lucas Bornemann	10	8	13	11	NC	14	7	1	8	2	6	2	3	3	12	4	7	6	196
7	(São Paulo (state)) Ricardo Alvarez	4	10	DSQ	DSQ	7	5	6	2	4	Ret	8	4	8	12	11	8	3	2	179
8	(São Paulo (state)) José Augusto Dias	7	1	2	7	5	11	Ret	NL	Ret	Wth	12	7	5	11	15	13	2	1	168
9	(São Paulo (state)) Léo Rufino	AT	WD	6	3	11	8	5	Ret	7	10	13	10	2	8	8	12	5	Ret	151
10	(São Paulo (state)) Daniel Keleman	5	INF	7	1	8	1	8	NL	9	Ret	10	8	Ret	Ret	9	INF	8	4	150
11	(São Paulo (state)) Márcio Giordano	Ret	4	5	8	9	6	12	8	5	11	11	13	4	6	5	11	Wth	NC	135
12	(Rio Grande do Sul) Maicon Roncen	Ret	NL	10	9	12	10	9	9	13	12	9	9	9	10	DNF	Ret	10	Ret	105
13	(São Paulo (state)) Kléber Eletric	2	Ret	14	NL	10	NC	4	12	11	8	Ret	NL	DSQ	DSQ	7	Ret	9	DSQ	97
14	(Espírito Santo) Hugo Cibien									10	7	4	3	11	5	6	7	NL	DNS	92
15	(Mato Grosso) Juca Bala	8	7	12	10	13	13	11	10	12	NL	Ret	INF	INF	DNQ	14	10	Ret	5	91
16	(Bahia) Diogo Moscato											2	5			3	5	INF	NL	60
17	(São Paulo (state)) Hiro Yano	11	NL	11	12	14	12	Ret	11	15	9									49
18	(São Paulo (state)) Glauco Barros	9	6	9	6	Ret	INF													42
19	(São Paulo (state)) Vinícius Palma															10	9	13	INF	24
20	(Goiás) Gustavo Teixeira											14	12	Ret	NL	Ret	NL	11	Ret	19
21	(Rio Grande do Sul) Bernardo Cardoso																	DNS	DNS	0
Pos	Driver	(Mato Grosso do Sul) CGR		(Goiás) GOI		(Paraná (state)) LON		(Minas Gerais) POT		(São Paulo (state)) INT		(Paraná (state)) CAS		(Rio Grande do Sul) TAR		(Minas Gerais) MGS		(Goiás) GNA		Pts

=== Constructors' Championship standings ===
Pos	Constructor	(Mato Grosso do Sul) CGR		(Goiás) GOI		(Paraná (state)) LON		(Minas Gerais) POT		(São Paulo (state)) INT		(Paraná (state)) CAS		(Rio Grande do Sul) TAR		(Minas Gerais) MGS		(Goiás) GNA		Pts
Pos	Constructor	RD1	RD2	RD1	RD2	RD1	RD2	RD1	RD2	RD1	RD2	RD1	RD2	RD1	RD2	RD1	RD2	RD1	RD2	Pts
1	(Germany) Volkswagen	1	2	2	2	1	1	3	2	1	1	1	1	2	4	1	2	1	1	606
1	(Germany) Volkswagen	4	3	3	3	3	6	4	3	2	6	2	2	10	8	6	3	5	4	606
2	(Germany) Mercedes-Benz	2	4	1	1	2	2	5	1	4	2	4	3	4	3	3	1	3	2	551
2	(Germany) Mercedes-Benz	3	5	4	4	6	5	7	8	5	3	6	6	6	7	4	7	4	3	551
3	(Italy) Iveco	6	1	5	6	4	3	1	5	3	17	3	4	1	1	2	4	2	6	495
3	(Italy) Iveco	7	6	10	7	5	4	2	6	8	19	7	5	3	2	5	5	8	10	495
4	(Sweden) Volvo	11	8	17	12	15	15	18	19	26	18	15	11	9	6	8	16	19	8	92
4	(Sweden) Volvo	15	16	24	17	Ret	INF			31	20	16	25	24	18	21	19	Ret	20	92
5	(Sweden) Scania	16	Ret	28	24	24	NC	20	26	27	22	28	22	Ret	NL	22	23	22	16	0
5	(Sweden) Scania	27	NL	31	NL	29	25	Ret	27	32	25	Ret	NL	INF	DNQ	29	Ret	25	Ret	0
Pos	Constructor	(Mato Grosso do Sul) CGR		(Goiás) GOI		(Paraná (state)) LON		(Minas Gerais) POT		(São Paulo (state)) INT		(Paraná (state)) CAS		(Rio Grande do Sul) TAR		(Minas Gerais) MGS		(Goiás) GNA		Pts

=== Points standings ===
Points	1°	2°	3°	4°	5°	6°	7°	8°	9°	10°	11°	12°	13°	14°	15°
Race 1	22	20	18	16	15	14	13	12	11	10	9	8	7	6	5
Race 2	18	16	14	12	11	10	9	8	7	6	5	4	3	2	1

== See also ==
- 2024 Stock Car Pro Series
- 2024 Stock Series
- Brasileiro de Marcas
- Moto 1000 GP
- SuperBike Brasil
- Fórmula Truck
