= Copa Truck =

Brazilian truck racing series

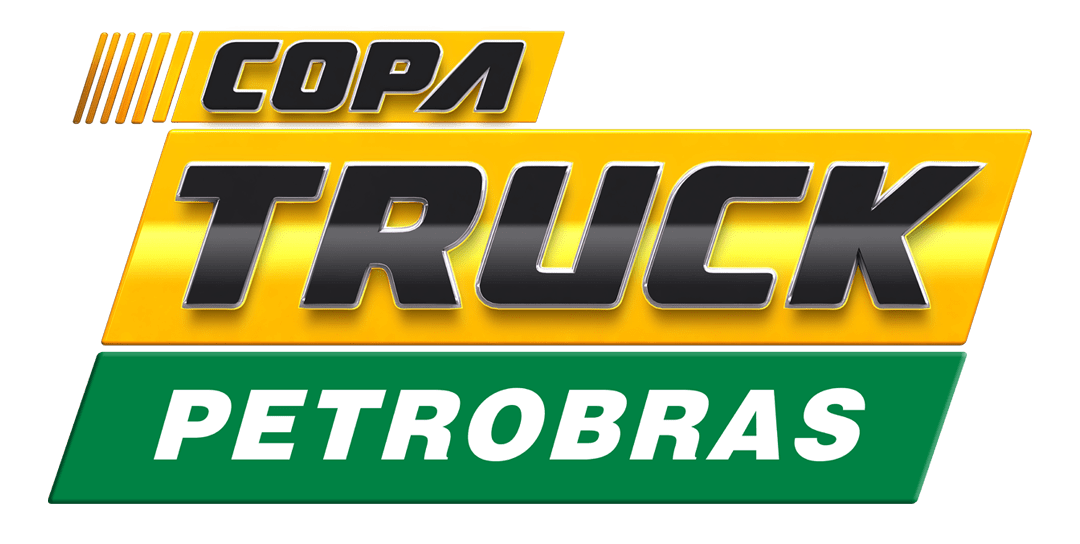
- Category: Truck racing
- Country: Brazil & South America
- Inaugural season: 2017
- Drivers: 44
- Teams: 14
- Constructors: (United States) Ford, (Italy) Iveco, (Germany) MAN, (Germany) Mercedes-Benz, (Sweden) Scania, (Sweden) Volvo, (Germany) Volkswagen
- Tyre suppliers: Pirelli (2017-2020); Goodyear (2021-2023); Prometeon (2024-present)
- Drivers' champion: (São Paulo (state)) Felipe Giaffone (2025)
- Teams' champion: R9 Competições (2025)

The Copa Truck is a Brazilian auto racing series, composed of trucks prepared for race. The category replaced the Fórmula Truck series in 2017.

== History ==
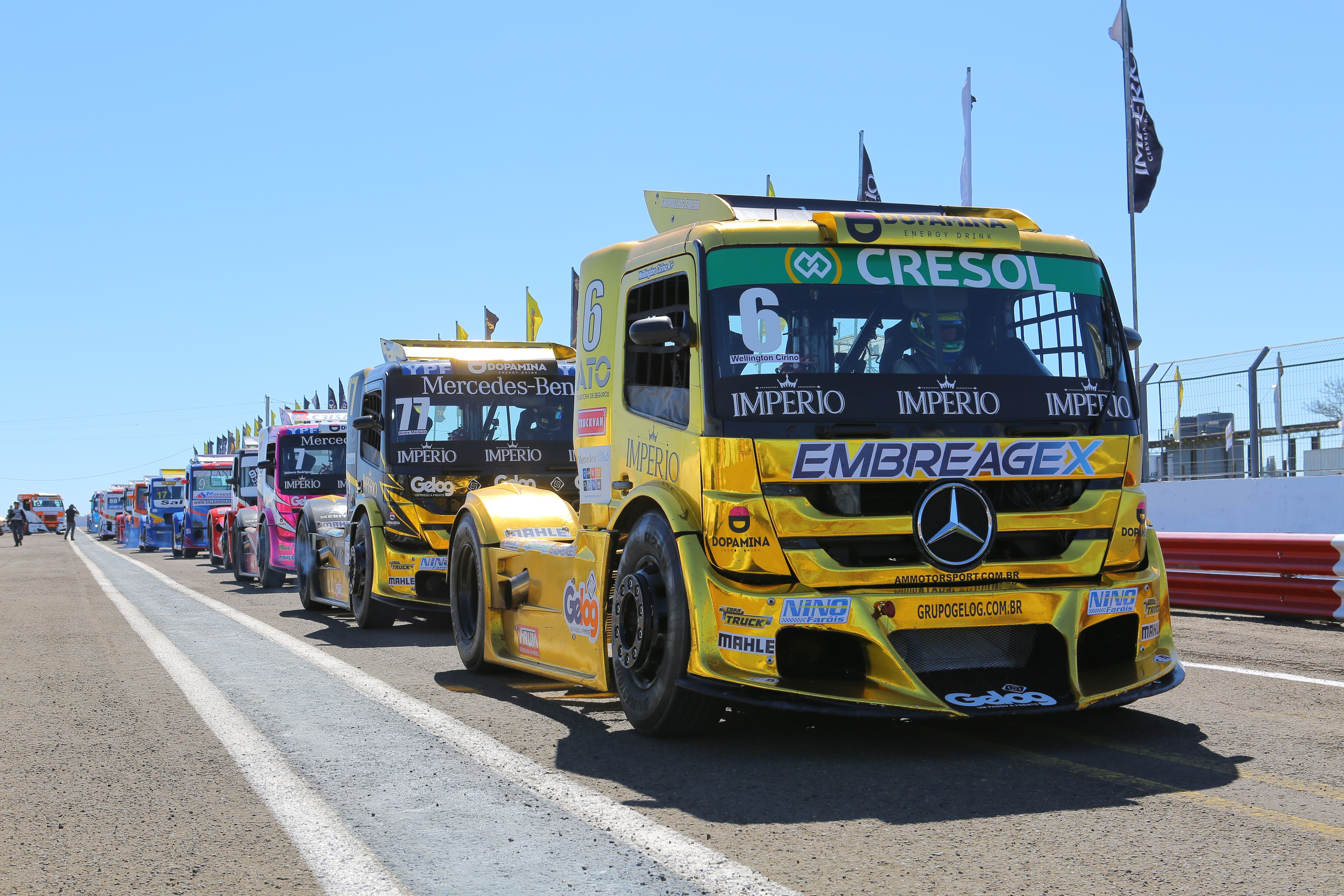
Copa Truck in Rivera, in Uruguay in 2019

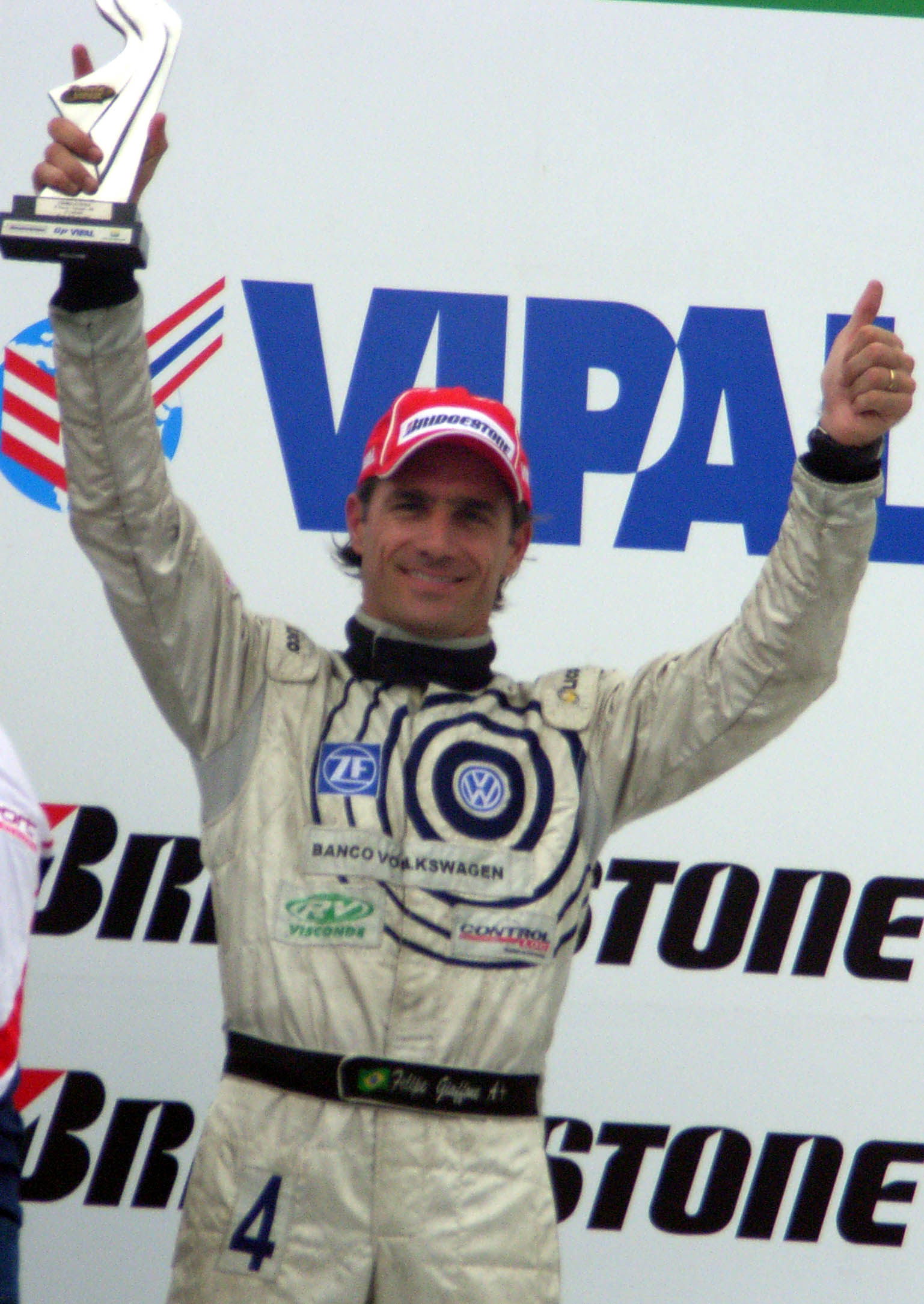
Felipe Giaffone is the biggest champion of the Copa Truck with three titles.

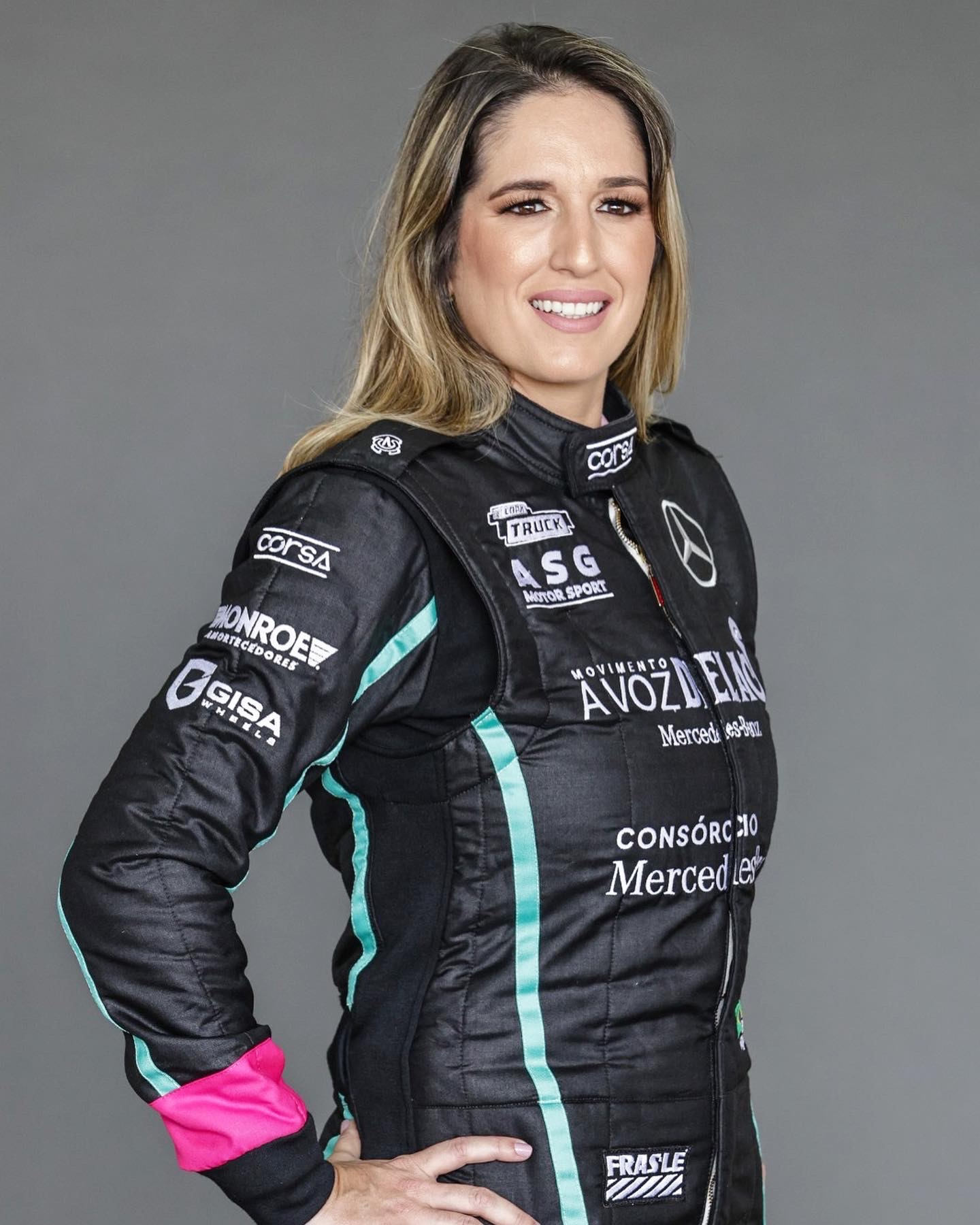
Bia Figueiredo became the first female champion of the Copa Truck.

The origin of the category came after nine teams left Formula Truck because of disagreements with the troubled management of Neusa Navarro Félix. These teams joined in an association, creating the category that came to replace Fórmula Truck. The new category brought together all the teams and drivers of the old category. In November 2017, it was homologated by the Brazilian Automobile Confederation (CBA) and was recognised as an official championship.

The Truck Cup was officially launched on April 27, 2017, in São Paulo. In the first season, the championship was divided into three regional cups: Midwest, Northeast, and Southeast. The first stage took place on May 28, in Goiânia, with 17 trucks on the grid.

The association is made up of the following teams: RM Competições, AJ5 Sports, DF Motorsport, RVR Motorsports, Dakar Motors, Fábio Fogaça Motorsports, Lucar Motorsports and Clay Truck Racing.

The beginning of everything

It was 1987 when truck driver Aurélio Batista Félix and Portuguese journalist Francisco Santos decided to organize the category's first race. This first Brazilian championship was a huge success, with 35 drivers and an attendance of 20,000 fans. Over time, the category evolved and gained popularity, and today the Truck Cup is the main truck racing category in Brazil, with 36 drivers from 12 teams competing in nine rounds throughout the year, with two races per round in the Pro and Super Elite categories.

Differences between racing and street trucks

The first is the height: while a standard truck measures 3.6 meters, Copa Truck vehicles are much lower, at about 2.5 meters. Another big difference is the power: 1,000 horsepower, twice that of an average transport truck. The brakes are also different, with pads capable of withstanding braking at speeds over 200 km/h. And also the tires, with a different shape and pressure, lower and rounded than those of a road vehicle, to increase grip.

Security

You can't be too cautious when you're inside a truck going 200 km/h, so in addition to the structure of a normal vehicle, the Copa Truck has stabilizer bars, a type of "cage" that offers extra protection to the driver, a special "bucket" type racing seat and five-point seat belts, in addition to all the inspections carried out by professionals to ensure the safety of the drivers.

Women in the Truck Cup

Women have a place in the Truck Cup, with two drivers vying for the top spot on the podium. In addition to Débora Rodrigues, one of the sport's pioneers, the category now also features Bia Figueiredo, who has competed in everything from Formula 3 Sudamericana to the Indianapolis 500.

Racing system

The season is divided into Grands Prix. Each Grand Prix has two qualifying sessions and four races: two with qualifying sessions and two with reverse grid sessions, one each on Saturday and Sunday. Free practice and qualifying are held before the first race. From qualifying, the top ten drivers enter the final round, where they compete for SuperPole. This determines the order of the top ten drivers for the first race. After Race 1, Race 2 begins with the finishing order from Race 1, except for the top eight places, which are reversed. Thus, the first driver in Race 1 will start eighth in Race 2 and vice versa, the second driver will start seventh and vice versa, the third driver will start sixth and vice versa, and the fourth driver will start fifth and vice versa. In Races 3 and 4, the format is similar to that of Races 1 and 2.

== Circuits ==
- (Uruguay) Autódromo Eduardo Prudêncio Cabrera (2018–2019)
- (Pernambuco) Autódromo Internacional Ayrton Senna (Caruaru) (2017)
- (Goiás) Autódromo Internacional Ayrton Senna (Goiânia) (2017–2024)
- (Paraná (state)) Autódromo Internacional Ayrton Senna (Londrina) (2019, 2022–present)
- (Federal District (Brazil)) Autódromo Internacional de Brasília (2026)
- (Paraná (state)) Autódromo Internacional de Cascavel (2018–2021, 2023–present)
- (Santa Catarina (state)) Autódromo Internacional de Chapecó (2026)
- (Paraná (state)) Autódromo Internacional de Curitiba (2018, 2020–2021)
- (Rio Grande do Sul) Autódromo Internacional de Guaporé (2018)
- Autódromo Internacional de Mato Grosso (2026)
- (Rio Grande do Sul) Autódromo Internacional de Santa Cruz do Sul (2019, 2022, 2026)
- (Rio Grande do Sul) Autódromo Internacional de Tarumã (2017, 2021–2025)
- (Mato Grosso do Sul) Autódromo Internacional Orlando Moura (2017–2019, 2024–present)
- (Minas Gerais) Autódromo Internacional Potenza (2021, 2024–2025)
- (Ceará) Autódromo Internacional Virgílio Távora (2017)
- (São Paulo (state)) Autódromo José Carlos Pace (2017–present)
- (Argentina) Autódromo Oscar y Juan Gálvez (2018)
- (Minas Gerais) Circuito dos Cristais (2018–2019, 2024–present)
- (Rio Grande do Sul) Velopark (2019)

== List Champions ==
Year	Brazilian Champion	Team	Constructor	Tire	Info
2017	(São Paulo (state)) Felipe Giaffone	(Brazil) RM Competições	(Germany) Volkswagen	P	
2018	(São Paulo (state)) Roberval Andrade	(Brazil) Dakar-Corinthians Motorsports	(Sweden) Scania	P	
2019	(Pernambuco) Beto Monteiro	(Brazil) R9 Competições	(Germany) Volkswagen	P	
2020	(Pernambuco) Beto Monteiro	(Brazil) R9 Competições	(Germany) Volkswagen	P	
2021	(São Paulo (state)) André Marques	(Brazil) AM Motorsport	(Germany) Mercedes-Benz	G	
2022	(Paraná (state)) Wellington Cirino	(Brazil) ASG Motorsport	(Germany) Mercedes-Benz	G	
2023	(São Paulo (state)) Felipe Giaffone	(Brazil) R9 Competições	(Germany) Volkswagen	G	
2024	(São Paulo (state)) Felipe Giaffone	(Brazil) R9 Competições	(Germany) Volkswagen	P	
2025	(São Paulo (state)) Felipe Giaffone	(Brazil) R9 Competições	(Germany) Volkswagen	P	

== List Champions of Super Truck ==
Year	Super Truck Champion	Team	Constructor	Tire	Info
2021	(Santa Catarina (state)) Felipe Tozzo	(Brazil) Dakar Motorsport	(Italy) Iveco	G	
2022	(Santa Catarina (state)) Danilo Alamini	(Brazil) R9 Competições	(Germany) Volkswagen	G	
2023	(Rio de Janeiro (state)) Thiago Rizzo	(Brazil) R9 Competições	(Germany) Volkswagen	G	
2024	(São Paulo (state)) Bia Figueiredo	(Brazil) ASG Motorsport	(Germany) Mercedes-Benz	P	
2025	(Paraná (state)) Pedro Perdoncini	(Brazil) ASG Motorsport	(Germany) Mercedes-Benz	P	

== PRO Truck Category Statistics ==
=== Titles by driver ===
Driver	Total	Titles
(São Paulo (state)) Felipe Giaffone	4	2017, 2023, 2024, 2025
(Pernambuco) Beto Monteiro	2	2019, 2020
(Paraná (state)) Wellington Cirino	1	2022
(São Paulo (state)) André Marques	1	2021
(São Paulo (state)) Roberval Andrade	1	2018

=== Titles by federation ===
Federation	Total	Titles
(São Paulo (state)) São Paulo	6	2017, 2018, 2021, 2023, 2024, 2025
Pernambuco	2	2019, 2020
(Paraná (state)) Paraná	1	2022

=== Titles by constructor ===
Constructor	Total	Titles
(Germany) Volkswagen	6	2017,2019, 2021, 2023, 2024, 2025
(Germany) Mercedes-Benz	2	2021, 2022
(Sweden) Scania	1	2018

=== Titles by team ===
Team	Total	Titles
(Brazil) RM/R9 Competições	6	2017, 2019, 2020, 2023, 2024, 2025
(Brazil) ASG Motorsport	1	2022
(Brazil) AM Motorsport	1	2021
(Brazil) Dakar-Corinthians Motorsports	1	2018

=== Titles per tyre ===
#	Tyre	Total	Titles
P	(Italy) Pirelli	4	2017, 2018, 2019, 2020
G	(United States) Goodyear	3	2021, 2022, 2023
P	(Italy) Prometeon	2	2024, 2025

== Super Truck Category Statistics ==
=== Titles by driver ===
Driver	Total	Titles
(São Paulo (state)) Bia Figueiredo	1	2024
(Rio de Janeiro (state)) Thiago Rizzo	1	2023
(Santa Catarina (state)) Danilo Alamini	1	2022
(Santa Catarina (state)) Felipe Tozzo	1	2021

=== Titles by federation ===
Federation	Total	Titles
(Santa Catarina (state)) Santa Catarina	2	2021, 2022
(São Paulo (state)) São Paulo	1	2024
(Rio de Janeiro (state)) Rio de Janeiro	1	2023

=== Titles by constructor ===
Constructor	Total	Titles
(Germany) Volkswagen	2	2022, 2023
(Germany) Mercedes-Benz	1	2024
(Italy) Iveco	1	2021

=== Titles by team ===
Team	Total	Titles
(Brazil) R9 Competições	2	2022, 2023
(Brazil) ASG Motorsport	1	2024
(Brazil) Dakar Motorsport	1	2021

=== Titles per tyre ===
#	Tyres	Total	Titles
G	(United States) Goodyear	3	2021, 2022, 2023
P	(Italy) Prometeon	2	2024, 2025

== List of Regional Cup champions ==
Pos	Driver	Titles	Regional Cup
1	(Pernambuco) Beto Monteiro	5	Copa Centro-Oeste (2017), Primeira Copa (2019 e 2020), Segunda Copa (2020), Terceira Copa (2019)
2	(São Paulo (state)) Felipe Giaffone	4	Copa Nordeste (2017), Copa Sul-Sudeste (2017), Copa Centro-Oeste (2018), Copa Mercosul (2018)
3	(São Paulo (state)) André Marques	2	Segunda Copa (2019), Copa Sudeste (2018)
4	(Paraíba) Valdeno Brito	1	Terceira Copa (2020)
5	(São Paulo (state)) Paulo Salustiano	1	Quarta Copa (2019)
6	(Paraná (state)) Wellington Cirino	1	Copa Sul (2018)

=== Points standings ===
It is fair to dismiss the three worst results of the season.

Points	1°	2°	3°	4°	5°	6°	7°	8°	9°	10°	11°	12°	13°	14°	15°
Race 1	22	20	18	16	15	14	13	12	11	10	9	8	7	6	5
Race 2	18	16	14	12	11	10	9	8	7	6	5	4	3	2	1

== Television coverage ==
The Races of the Copa Truck are broadcast on Cable Television including: ESPN, Fox Sports, Movistar+, CBS Sports & NBC Sports.

=== Coverage in Brazil ===
Transmission
sinmarco SporTV	Narration: Burno Fonseca
sinmarco SporTV	Narration: Rogério Rockenbach
sinmarco SporTV	Commentator: Luciano Burti
sinmarco SporTV	Commentator: Rafael Lopes

Transmission
sinmarco Band	Narration: Luc Monteiro
sinmarco Band	Narration: Márcio Possamai
sinmarco Band	Commentator: Gilberto Bertarello
sinmarco Band	Commentator: Ana Coser Mazutti

Transmission
sinmarco BandSports	Narration: Octávio Muniz
sinmarco BandSports	Narration: Marcelo Bonucci
sinmarco BandSports	Commentator: Robson Amaral
sinmarco BandSports	Commentator: Claudia Refatti Benato

Transmission
sinmarco YouTube	Narration: Rodrigo Vicente
sinmarco YouTube	Narration: Bruno Vicaria
sinmarco YouTube	Commentator: Ivar Castagnetti
sinmarco YouTube	Commentator: Henrique Gava

=== Other countries ===
- Colombia: RCN Televisión & RCN HD2
- Portugal: Sport TV
- (United Kingdom) Reino Unido: BT Sport
- (Canada) Canadá: Sportsnet
- (Spain) España: Movistar+
- (Mercosur) Hispanoamérica: ESPN & Star+

=== Streaming links ===
Internet (Global)
YouTube
Motorsport.tv
Facebook
Zoome
Catve.com
Auto Videos
Twitch

== See also ==
- Mercedes-Benz Challenge
- NASCAR Brasil Series
- Stock Car Pro Series
- Stock Series
- Campeonato Brasileiro de Turismo
- Moto 1000 GP
- SuperBike Brasil
- Fórmula Truck
