= Autódromo Internacional Potenza =

Motor racing track in Lima Duarte, Minas Gerais, Brazil

- Location: Lima Duarte, Minas Gerais, Brazil
- Coordinates: 21°47′23″S 43°39′47″W
- Broke ground: 2018
- Opened: 4 December 2020; 5 years ago
- Architect: Milanez Arquitetos
- Major events: Former: Copa Truck (2021, 2024–2025); NASCAR Brasil Sprint Race (2021, 2024); Brazilian Superbike Championship (2020–2023)

Full Circuit (2020–present)
- Length: 3.200 km (1.988 mi)
- Turns: 16
- Race lap record: 1:24.552 ( (Brazil) Gui Brito, Honda CBR1000RR, 2023, SBK)

Autódromo Internacional Potenza or Autódromo Potenza Eireli is a counter-clockwise 3.200 km (1.988 mi) motorsports circuit located on the 17 km (11 mi) northeast of Lima Duarte. The circuit was built in 2018, has 12 to 15 m (39 to 49 ft) width.

The circuit has hosted national events, such as Brazilian Superbike Championship, and Copa Truck.

== Lap records ==
As of June 2024, the fastest official race lap records at the Autódromo Internacional Potenza are listed as:

Category	Time	Driver	Vehicle	Event
Full Circuit (2020–present): 3.200 km (1.988 mi)
Superbike	1:24.552	Gui Brito	Honda CBR1000RR	2023 Potenza Superbike Brasil round
Supersport	1:27.545	Theo Manna	Kawasaki Ninja ZX-6R	2023 Potenza Superbike Brasil round
NASCAR Brasil	1:34.743	Leo Reis	Chevrolet Camaro NASCAR Brasil	2024 Potenza NASCAR Brasil round
Supersport 300	1:34.913	Renan Fui	Kawasaki Ninja 400	2023 Potenza Superbike Brasil round
Truck racing	1:51.061	Danilo Dirani	Iveco Hi-Way	2024 Potenza Copa Truck round
