= Débora Rodrigues =

- Nationality: (Brazil) Brazilian
- Born: 23 May 1968 (age 58) Bela Vista do Paraíso, Paraná, Brazil

Copa Truck career
- Debut season: 2017
- Current team: AM Motorsports
- Car number: 7

Previous series
- 1998–2016: Formula Truck

Débora Rodrigues (born 23 May 1968) is a Brazilian racing driver and businesswoman from, who currently competes in Copa Truck. A former member of the Landless Workers' Movement (MST), she left poverty after being invited to pose for Playboy magazine, a fact that projected her in the media and, consequently, made her invited to become a presenter on SBT.

== Biography ==
The daughter of a truck driver, Rodrigues learned to drive trucks at age twelve. Before appearing in the media, she worked as a babysitter, attendant, bus and truck driver, receptionist and secretary. At 1.71 meters in height, in October 1997 the Paranense received the title of "Muse of the Landless" when posing for Playboy (edition 267) - title received for having been engaged for years in the cause of MST. The stardom in the magazine brought her fame and job as a presenter.

Rodrigues started racing in 1998, after making a story about the sport, with the presenter Otávio Mesquita, for the Domingo Legal program of the SBT. At the time when she posed naked with her sister, Débora participated in the last chapter of the telenovela A Indomada, at the time when she still lived in Teodoro Sampaio, in the state of São Paulo, where she was part of a camping of the MST. Later, she moved to São Paulo, where she became one of the presenters of the program Fantasia, of the SBT, in its first phase. She has also been a reporter for the Brasil Caminhoneiro program on the same station for years.

Rodrigues participated in the reality show Mulheres Ricas, on Band, showing their lifestyle and daily life. The socialite called herself "the simplest of the millionaires," because she spent less and was more down-to-earth than her colleagues.

Rodrigues has three children: Jacqueline, João Paulo and Renato, from her marriage with Renato Martins, who is also Formula Truck driver.
