= Roberval Andrade =

Brazilian racing driver (born 1970)

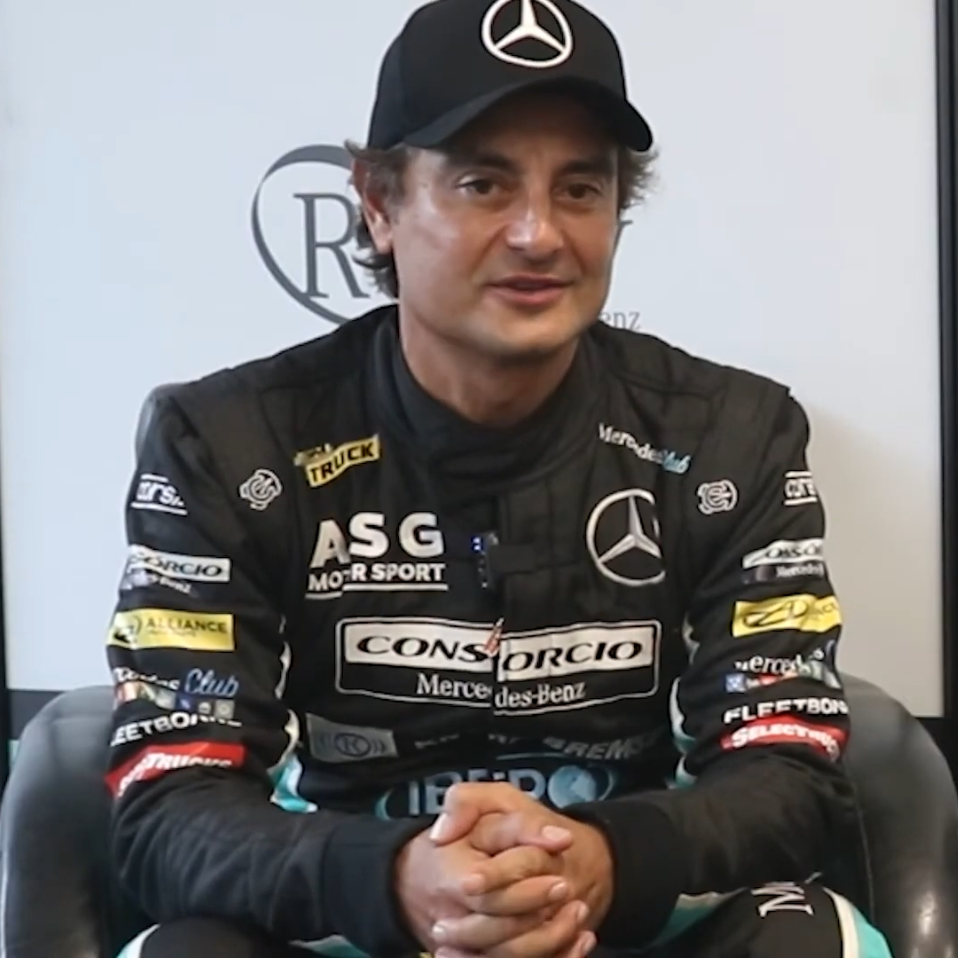
- Andrade in 2022
- Nationality: (Brazil) Brazilian
- Born: Roberval Menezes de Andrade; 6 December 1970 (age 55) São Paulo, Brazil

Copa Truck career
- Championships: 1 (2018)
- Best finish: 1st in 2018

Previous series
- 2000-2016: Fórmula Truck

Championship titles
- 2002, 2010 2018: Fórmula Truck; Copa Truck

Roberval Menezes de Andrade (born 6 December 1970) is a Brazilian racing driver. He is currently competing in the Copa Truck. He was the driver's champion in Fórmula Truck, in 2002 and 2010, and Copa Truck in 2018.

== Career ==
Andrade won the Fórmula Truck championship in 2002 and again in 2010. In 2016, Andrade worked for the Ticket Car® Corinthians Motorsport team, representing his team and Sport Club Corinthians Paulista. Moving to Copa Truck, he won his first (and so far only) championship there in 2018.
