= Moto 1000 GP =

Motorcycle racing category in Brazil

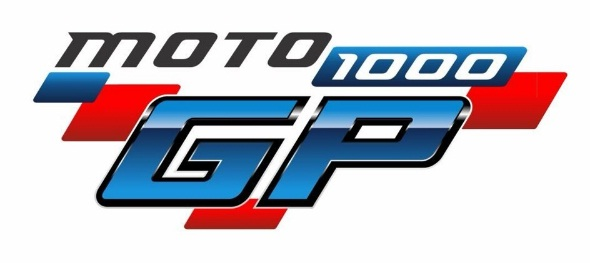
- Category: Motorcycle sport
- Country: Brazil
- Inaugural season: 2011
- Riders: 26
- Teams: 12
- Constructors: 6 (Germany) BMW, (Italy) Ducati, (Japan) Honda, (Japan) Kawasaki, (Japan) Suzuki, (Japan) Yamaha
- Tyre suppliers: P Pirelli
- Riders' champion: 2015 - (France) Mathieu Lussiana
- Official website: m1gp.com.br

The Brazilian Moto 1000 GP Championship was the main motorcycle category in Brazil between 2011 and 2015. It was resumed again after a seven year hiatus in 2023.

Competing with SuperBike Brasil, the competition was created in 2011 and has been led since its founding by motorcyclist Alex Barros. In the category participated: Honda, Suzuki, Kawasaki, Yamaha, BMW and Ducati.

== Circuits (2011–2015) ==
These are the circuits that have hosted a qualifying race for the Brazilian Moto 1000 GP Championship from 2011 to 2015:

- (Paraná (state)) Autódromo Internacional de Curitiba (2011–2015)
- (Rio Grande do Sul) Autódromo Internacional de Santa Cruz do Sul (2011–2015)
- (São Paulo (state)) Autódromo de Interlagos (2011–2014)
- (Federal District (Brazil)) Autódromo Internacional Nelson Piquet (2011–2012 & 2014)
- (Rio de Janeiro (state)) Autódromo Internacional Nelson Piquet (2011)
- (Paraná (state)) Autódromo Zilmar Beux de Cascavel (2012–2015)
- (Mato Grosso do Sul) Autódromo Internacional Orlando Moura (2013 & 2015)
- (Goiás) Autódromo Internacional Ayrton Senna (2014–2015)

== Brazilian Superbike Champions ==
=== GP 1000 ===
Season	Champion	Bike	Constructor	Team	Info
2011	(Paraná (state)) Alan Douglas Santos	(Germany) BMW S1000RR	(Germany) BMW	(Brazil) Pitico Race	
2012	(Argentina) Luciano Ribodino	(Germany) BMW S1000RR	(Germany) BMW	(Brazil) BMW Motorrad Petronas Alex Barros Racing	
2013	(Argentina) Luciano Ribodino	(Germany) BMW S1000RR	(Germany) BMW	(Brazil) BMW Motorrad Petronas Alex Barros Racing	
2014	(France) Mathieu Lussiana	(Germany) BMW S1000RR	(Germany) BMW	(Brazil) BMW Motorrad Petronas Alex Barros Racing	
2015	(France) Mathieu Lussiana	(Germany) BMW S1000RR	(Germany) BMW	(Brazil) BMW Motorrad Petronas Alex Barros Racing	
2016	(São Paulo (state)) Alex Barros	(Germany) BMW S1000RR	(Germany) BMW	(Brazil) BMW Motorrad Petronas Alex Barros Racing	
2017	(Spain) Sérgio Garcia	(Japan) Honda CBR1000RR	(Japan) Honda	(Brazil) Scherer Sport PHX	
2018	(São Paulo (state)) Danilo Lewis	(Germany) BMW S1000RR	(Germany) BMW	(Brazil) Primus Racing	
2019	(São Paulo (state)) Danilo Lewis	(Germany) BMW S1000RR	(Germany) BMW	(Brazil) Tecfil Racing Team	
2020	(Espírito Santo) Rodrigo Dazzi	(Germany) BMW S1000RR	(Germany) BMW	(Brazil) Dazzi Racing	
2021	(Espírito Santo) Rodrigo Dazzi	(Germany) BMW S1000RR	(Germany) BMW	(Brazil) Dazzi Racing	
2022	(Espírito Santo) Rodrigo Dazzi	(Germany) BMW S1000RR	(Germany) BMW	(Brazil) Dazzi Racing	
2023	(Argentina) Ramiro Gandola	(Japan) Yamaha YZF-R1	(Japan) Yamaha	(Brazil) PRT / AD78 Yamaha Racing	
2024	(Argentina) Ramiro Gandola	(Germany) BMW S1000RR	(Germany) BMW	(Argentina) Agem Racing Team	
2025	(Argentina) Ramiro Gandola	(Germany) BMW S1000RR	(Germany) BMW	(Argentina) Agem Racing Team	

=== GP Light ===
Season	Champion	Bike	Constructor	Team	Info
2011	(São Paulo (state)) Eduardo Costa Neto	(Japan) Kawasaki Ninja ZX-10R	(Japan) Kawasaki	(Brazil) Mobil Rush Racing Team	
2012	(São Paulo (state)) Lucas Barros	(Germany) BMW S1000RR	(Germany) BMW	(Brazil) Alex Barros Racing	
2013	(São Paulo (state)) Renato Andreghetto	(Germany) BMW S1000RR	(Germany) BMW	(Germany) Petronas Eurobike SBK	
2014	(Argentina) Nicolas Tortone	(Japan) Yamaha YZF-R1	(Japan) Yamaha	(Brazil) MGBikes Yamaha Racing	
2015	(Paraná (state)) Rafael Nunes	(Japan) Suzuki GSX-R 100	(Japan) Suzuki	(Japan) Team Suzuki PRT	
2016	(Espírito Santo) Rodrigo Dazzi	(Germany) BMW S1000RR	(Germany) BMW	(Brazil) Dazzi Racing	
2017	(Paraná (state)) Wesley Gutiérrez	(Japan) Suzuki GSX-R 100	(Japan) Suzuki	(Brazil) Collection Motorsport	
2018	(Rio de Janeiro (state)) Alex Pires	(Japan) Kawasaki Ninja ZX-10R	(Japan) Kawasaki	(United States) Simpson Motorsport	
2019	(Bahia) Jacob Larchert Jr	(Italy) Ducati 1299R Panigale	(Italy) Ducati	(Brazil) GASS Racing	
2020	(Paraná (state)) Luís Bertoli	(Japan) Kawasaki Ninja ZX-10R	(Japan) Kawasaki	(Brazil) Hoshino Racing	
2021	(Federal District (Brazil)) William Barros	(Japan) Kawasaki Ninja ZX-10R	(Japan) Kawasaki	(Brazil) Hoshino Racing	
2022	(Minas Gerais) Victor Azevedo Oliveira	(Japan) Kawasaki Ninja ZX-10R	(Japan) Kawasaki	(Brazil) Cosmic Racing	
Category not contested in the 2023 season
2024	(Minas Gerais) Diego Hilel	(Japan) Yamaha YZF-R1	(Japan) Yamaha	(Brazil) PRT - Pitico Race Team	
2025	(Goiás) Eduardo Marques	(Japan) Honda CBR1000RR	(Japan) Honda	(Brazil) Motobel Brothers	

=== GP 600 ===
Season	Champion	Bike	Constructor	Team	Info
2012	(São Paulo (state)) André Veríssimo	(Japan) Kawasaki Ninja ZX-6R	(Japan) Kawasaki	(Brazil) Motrix Scigliano Racing	
2013	(Rio Grande do Sul) Rafael Bertagnolli	(Japan) Kawasaki Ninja ZX-6R	(Japan) Kawasaki	(Brazil) BSB Motor Racing	
2014	(Uruguay) Maximiliano Gerardo	(Japan) Yamaha YZF-R6	(Japan) Yamaha	(Brazil) Carlos Barcelos Racing	
2015	(São Paulo (state)) Eric Granado	(Japan) Honda CBR 600RR	(Japan) Honda	(Brazil) GST Honda Mobil Super Moto	
Categoría no disputada entre las temporadas 2016 y 2018
2019	(Minas Gerais) Antônio Franzen	(Japan) Kawasaki Ninja ZX-6R	(Japan) Kawasaki	(Brazil) FR Competition	
2020	(Federal District (Brazil)) Bruno César Borges	(Japan) Kawasaki Ninja ZX-6R	(Japan) Kawasaki	(Brazil) Gebhardt Motorsport	
2021	(São Paulo (state)) Rubens Mesquita	(Italy) Ducati Panigale V2	(Italy) Ducati	(Brazil) Gebhardt Motorsport	
2022	(Federal District (Brazil)) Welber Barros	(Japan) Kawasaki Ninja ZX-6R	(Japan) Kawasaki	(Brazil) Gebhardt Motorsport	
2023	(Federal District (Brazil)) Kaywan Freire	(Japan) Kawasaki Ninja ZX-6R	(Japan) Kawasaki	(Brazil) Centermoto Racing	
2024	(Paraguay) Pedro Valiente	(Japan) Yamaha YZF-R6	(Japan) Yamaha	(Brazil) PRT - Pitico Race Team	
2025	(São Paulo (state)) Humberto Maier	(Japan) Yamaha YZF-R6	(Japan) Yamaha	(Brazil) JD43HPA/M78 bLu cRu Academy	

=== GPR 250 ===
Season	Champion	Bike	Team	Info
2013	(Rio Grande do Sul) Pedro Sampaio	(Japan) Honda CBR 250R	(Brazil) Fábio Loko Racing	
2014	(São Paulo (state)) Meikon Kawakami	(Japan) Honda CBR 250R	(Brazil) PlayStation PRT	
2015	(Goiás) Brian David	(Japan) Honda CBR 250R	(Brazil) Estrella Galicia 0,0 by Alex Barros	

=== GP Master ===
Season	Champion	Bike	Team	Info
2012	(Rio de Janeiro (state)) Alberto Fraga	(Japan) Suzuki GSX-R1000	(Brazil) Center Motor Racing Team	
2013	(São Paulo (state)) Sidnei Scigliano	(Japan) Suzuki GSX-R1000	(Brazil) Motrix Scigliano Racing	

=== BMW S1000RR Cup ===
Season	Champion	Bike	Team	Info
2011	(São Paulo (state)) Ricardo Kastropil	(Germany) BMW S1000RR	(Brazil) JC Racing Team	

=== GP 1000 EVO ===
Season	Champion	Bike	Team	Info
2015	(São Paulo (state)) Nick Iatauro	(Japan) Suzuki GSX-R1000	(Japan) Team Suzuki PRT	

=== GP 600 EVO ===
Season	Champion	Bike	Team	Info
2015	(Rio Grande do Sul) Marciano Santin	(Japan) Kawasaki Ninja ZX-6R	(Brazil) Santin Racing	
