= Beto Monteiro =

Brazilian racing driver (born 1975)

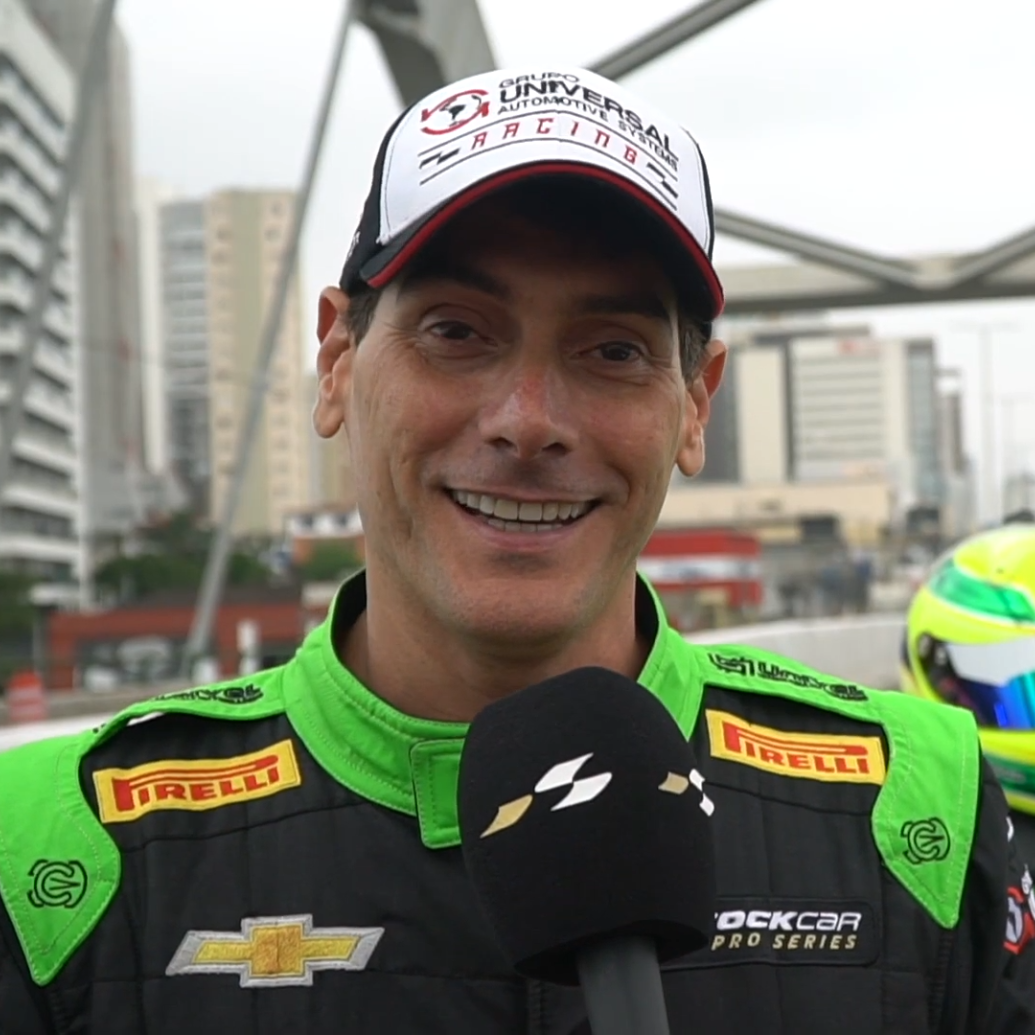
- Nationality: (Brazil) Brazilian
- Born: 18 August 1975 (age 51) Recife, Brazil

Fórmula Truck career
- Debut season: 2000
- Current team: Scuderia Iveco
- Car number: 1
- Former teams: DF Motorsport, Roberval Motorsport
- Starts: 142
- Championships: 2 (2004, 2013)
- Wins: 11
- Poles: 11
- Fastest laps: 13
- Best finish: 1st in 2004 and 2013

Beto Monteiro (born 18 August 1975 in Recife, Brazil) is a Brazilian racing driver. He is currently competing in the Fórmula Truck.

== Racing record ==
=== Career summary ===
Season	Series	Team	Races	Wins	Poles	FLaps	Podiums	Points	Position
1995	Italian Formula Three Championship - Class B	N/A	8	0	0	0	2	N/A	5th
1999	Fórmula Truck	DF Motorsport	2	0	0	0	0	0	NC
2000	Fórmula Truck	DF Motorsport	6	0	0	0	0	6	18th
2001	Fórmula Truck	DF Motorsport	7	0	0	0	1	44	9th
2002	Fórmula Truck	DF Motorsport	9	2	3	3	4	89	4th
2003	Fórmula Truck	DF Motorsport	8	0	0	2	5	110	4th
2004	Fórmula Truck	DF Motorsport	9	2	2	3	4	129	**1st**
2005	Fórmula Truck	DF Motorsport	8	0	0	0	1	52	6th
2006	Fórmula Truck	DF Motorsport	9	0	0	0	2	46	10th
2007	Fórmula Truck	DF Motorsport	8	0	0	1	1	36	9th
2008	Fórmula Truck	Roberval Motorsport	10	1	1	1	2	53	6th
2008	Pick-Up Racing Brazil	Full Time Sports	1	0	0	0	0	0	NC
2009	Fórmula Truck	Scuderia Iveco	10	0	0	0	2	77	7th
2009	Top Race V6	Martínez Competición	1	0	0	0	0	0	NC
2010	GT Brasil	WB Motorsport	2	0	0	0	0	11	29th
2010	Fórmula Truck	Scuderia Iveco	10	1	1	0	2	90	6th
2010	NASCAR K&N Pro Series East	TWR	1	0	0	0	0	146	47th
2011	Campeonato de Fórmula Truck Brasileiro	Scuderia Iveco	7	0	0	0	1	54	9th
2011	Fórmula Truck Sulamericano	Scuderia Iveco	3	0	1	0	0	28	8th
2011	NASCAR K&N Pro Series East	TWR	1	0	0	0	0	152	51st
2011	Formula 3 Sudamericana	Cesário Fórmula Junior	3	0	0	0	1	0†	NC†
2011	Formula 3 Sudamericana - B Class	Cesário Fórmula Junior	3	1	0	0	1	25	9th
2012	Fórmula Truck	Scuderia Iveco	10	2	2	1	4	128	**3rd**
2012	Fórmula Truck Sulamericano	Scuderia Iveco	4	1	1	1	2	66	**2nd**
2012	NASCAR K&N Pro Series East	X Team Racing	1	0	0	0	0	21	75th
2013	Fórmula Truck	Scuderia Iveco	10	2	0	0	3	149	**1st**
2013	Fórmula Truck Sulamericano	Scuderia Iveco	4	2	0	0	2	72	**1st**
2014	Fórmula Truck	Scuderia Iveco	9	1	1	1	1	82	7th
2014	Fórmula Truck Sulamericano	Scuderia Iveco	3	0	0	0	0	20	11th
2014	NASCAR K&N Pro Series East	Troy Williams Racing	1	0	0	0	0	37	51st
2015	Stock Car Brasil	Ipiranga-RCM	2	0	0	0	0	0	NC
2015	Fórmula Truck	Lucar Motorsports	17	0	0	0	0	162	13th
2015	Brasileiro de Marcas	KFF Pro Racing	2	0	0	0	0	0	33rd
2016	Fórmula Truck	Lucar Motorsports	16	0	0	0	0	121	14th
2016	Brasileiro de Marcas	Romera Sports; RZ Motorsport Toyota	5	0	0	0	0	76	14th
2016	FARA USA Endurance Championship - MP-1B	Ginetta USA	3	2	2	2	3	0	NC
2025	NASCAR Brasil Series	MX Vogel							
2026	TCR South America Touring Car Championship	Paladini Racing							

^{†} Not eligible for points.

=== Incomplete Fórmula Truck results ===
(key)

Year	Entrant	Truck	1	2	3	4	5	6	7	8	9	10	DC	Points
2000	DF Motorsport	Ford	? ?	? ?	? ?	? ?	? ?	? ?					18th	6
2001	DF Motorsport	Ford	? ?	? ?	? ?	? ?	? ?	? ?	? ?				9th	44
2002	DF Motorsport	Ford	? ?	? ?	? ?	? ?	? ?	? ?	? ?	? ?	? ?		4th	89
2003	DF Motorsport	Ford	GOI ?	GUA ?	CAS ?	BRA ?	LON ?	CAM ?	INT ?	TAR ?	CUR ?		4th	110
2004	DF Motorsport	Ford	CAR; 1	GUA ?	INT ?	GOI; 1	CAM ?	LON; 1	CAS ?	TAR ?	BRA ?		1st	129
2005	DF Motorsport	Ford	CAR ?	GOI ?	INT ?	GUA ?	LON ?	CAM ?	CUR ?	TAR ?	BRA ?		6th	52
2006	DF Motorsport	Ford	CAR ?	VTA ?	INT ?	GUA ?	CAM ?	CAS ?	CUR ?	TAR ?	BRA ?		10th	46
2007	DF Motorsport	Ford	? ?	? ?	? ?	? ?	? ?	? ?	? ?	? ?			9th	36
2008	Roberval Motorsport	Scania	? ?	? ?	? ?	? ?	? ?	? ?	? ?	? ?	? ?	? ?	6th	53
2009	Scuderia Iveco	Iveco	GUA; 7	VTA; 19	CAR; 16	GOI; 25	INT; 16	LON ?	BUE ?	SCZ; 3	CUR; 3	BRA ?	7th	77
2010	Scuderia Iveco	Iveco	GUA; Ret	RIO; Ret	CAR; 6	CAM; 7	INT; 7	LON; 7	BUE; 16	**VEL**; 1	CUR; Ret	BRA; 2	6th	90
2011	Scuderia Iveco	Iveco	RIO; 5	CAR; Ret	GOI; 11	LON; Ret	GUA; Ret	CUR; 2	BRA; 9				9th	54
2012	Scuderia Iveco	Iveco	**VEL**; 1	RIO; 1	CAR; 3	GOI; 8	INT; 9	**CAS**; Ret	OCA; 8	GUA; 15	CUR; 15	BRA; 2	3rd	128
2013	Scuderia Iveco	Iveco	TAR; Ret	LON; 6	CAR; 4	GOI; 11	INT; 1	CAS; 4	OCA; 1	GUA; 3	CUR; 8	BRA; 4	1st	149
2014	Scuderia Iveco	Iveco	CAR; 6	CUR; 7	INT; 7	BRA; 11	CAS	**SCZ**; 1	OCA; 13	GUA; Ret	LON; Ret	GOI; 4	7th	82

=== Complete Fórmula Truck Sulamericano results ===
(key)

Year	Entrant	Truck	1	2	3	4	DC	Points
2011	Scuderia Iveco	Iveco	**SCZ**; 6	INT; 10	BUE; 11		**8th**	**28**
2012	Scuderia Iveco	Iveco	**VEL**; 1	CAR; 3	INT; 9	OCA; 8	**2nd**	**66**
2013	Scuderia Iveco	Iveco	TAR; Ret	CAR; 4	INT; 1	OCA; 1	**1st**	**72**
2014	Scuderia Iveco	Iveco	CAR; 6	INT; 7	CAS	OCA; 13	**11th**	**20**

=== Complete Top Race V6 results ===
(key)

Year	Entrant	1	2	3	4	5	6	7	8	9	10	11	12	13	14	DC	Points
2009	Martínez Competición	ACC	SAL	JUL	BAH	ZON	OCA	INT	MOU; 21	LRJ	BUE	TRH	GSM	PAR; 1	PAR; 2	**NC**	**0**

=== Complete GT Brasil results ===
(key)

Year	Entrant	Class	1	2	3	4	5	6	7	8	9	10	11	12	13	14	15	16	DC	Points
2010	WB Motorsport	GT3	INT; 1; 5	INT; 2; 6	CUR; 1	CUR; 2	INT; 1	INT; 2	RIO; 1	RIO; 2	INT; 1	INT; 2	VEL; 1	VEL; 2	CUR; 1	CUR; 2	INT; 1	INT; 2	**29th**	**11**

=== Complete Formula 3 Sudamericana results ===
(key)

Year	Entrant	Class	1	2	3	4	5	6	7	8	9	10	11	12	13	14	15	16	17	18	19	20	21	22	23	24	25	DC	Points
2011	Cesário Fórmula Junior	A	VEL; 1	VEL; 2	VEL; 3	INT; 1	INT; 2	INT; 3	RIO; 1	RIO; 2	RIO; 3	CAR; 1 Ret	CAR; 2 Ret	CAR; 3; 3	CAM; 1	CAM; 2	CAM; 3	SCZ; 1	SCZ; 2	SCZ; 3	PAR; 1	PAR; 2	BRA; 1	BRA; 2	BRA; 3	CAM; 1	CAM; 2	**NC†**	**0†**
2011	Cesário Fórmula Junior	B	VEL; 1	VEL; 2	VEL; 3	INT; 1	INT; 2	INT; 3	RIO; 1	RIO; 2	RIO; 3	CAR; 1 Ret	CAR; 2 Ret	CAR; 3; 1	CAM; 1	CAM; 2	CAM; 3	SCZ; 1	SCZ; 2	SCZ; 3	PAR; 1	PAR; 2	BRA; 1	BRA; 2	BRA; 3	CAM; 1	CAM; 2	**9th**	**25**

^{†} Not eligible for points.

=== NASCAR ===
(key) (Bold - Pole position awarded by qualifying time. Italics - Pole position earned by points standings or practice time. * – Most laps led.)

==== K&N Pro Series East ====
NASCAR K&N Pro Series East results
Year	Team	No.	Make	1	2	3	4	5	6	7	8	9	10	11	12	13	14	15	16	NKNPSEC	Pts
2010	Troy Williams Racing	12	Dodge	GRE	SBO	IOW	MAR; 7	NHA	LRP	LEE	JFC	NHA	DOV							47th	146
2011	Troy Williams Racing	12	Dodge	GRE	SBO	RCH	IOW	BGS	JFC	LGY	NHA; DNQ	COL; 21	GRE	NHA	DOV					51st	152
2012	Troy Williams Racing	12	Dodge	BRI	GRE	RCH	IOW	BGS	JFC	LGY	CNB	COL	IOW	NHA	DOV	GRE	CAR; 23			75th	21
2014	Troy Williams Racing	12	Dodge	NSM	DAY; DNQ	BRI	GRE	RCH; 23	IOW	BGS	FIF	LGY	NHA	COL	IOW	GLN	VIR	GRE	DOV	51st	37
