= 2013 Fórmula Truck season =

Brazilian truck racing season

2013 Fórmula Truck

Seasons
- ← 2012 2014 →

The 2013 Fórmula Truck season was the 18th Fórmula Truck season. It commenced on March 10 at Tarumã and ended on December 8 at Brasília. All ten rounds counted towards the Brazilian title, with four rounds counting towards the South American title.

== Teams and drivers ==
All drivers were Brazilian-registered, excepting Alex Caffi, who raced under Italian racing license.

| Manufacturer | Team | No. | Driver | Rounds |
|---|---|---|---|---|
| Volvo | ABF Motorsport | 0 | Alberto Catucci | All |
| Volvo | ABF Motorsport | 30 | Rogério Castro | 2–9 |
| Volvo | DB Motorsport | 11 | Jansen Bueno | All |
| Volvo | Clay Truck Racing | 14 | João Marcos Maistro | All |
| Iveco | Scuderia Iveco | 2 | Valmir Benavides | All |
| Iveco | Scuderia Iveco | 88 | Beto Monteiro | All |
| Iveco | Dakar Motorsport | 21 | Alex Caffi | 3–10 |
| Iveco | Lucar Motorsports | 99 | Luiz Lopes | All |
| Mercedes-Benz | ABF Mercedes-Benz | 3 | Geraldo Piquet | 1, 3–10 |
| Mercedes-Benz | ABF Mercedes-Benz | 6 | Wellington Cirino | All |
| Mercedes-Benz | ABF Mercedes-Benz | 70 | Danilo Dirani | 2 |
| Mercedes-Benz | ABF Racing Team | 55 | Paulo Salustiano | All |
| Mercedes-Benz | ABF Racing Team | 80 | Diogo Pachenki | All |
| Mercedes-Benz | Boessio Competições | 83 | Régis Boessio | All |
| MAN | RM Competições | 4 | Felipe Giaffone | All |
| Volkswagen MAN | RM Competições | 7 | Débora Rodrigues | All |
| Volkswagen MAN | RM Competições | 8 | Adalberto Jardim | All |
| Volkswagen MAN | RM Competições | 73 | Leandro Totti | All |
| Volkswagen MAN | RM Competições | 77 | André Marques | All |
| Scania | Ticket Car Corinthians Motorsport | 10 | Ronaldo Kastropil | All |
| Scania | Ticket Car Corinthians Motorsport | 15 | Roberval Andrade | All |
| Scania | Original Reis Peças | 12 | José Maria Reis | All |
| Scania | Original Reis Peças | 51 | Leandro Reis | All |
| Scania | Muffatão Racing | 20 | Pedro Muffato | 2, 4–7, 9–10 |
| Scania | Muffatão Racing | 22 | David Muffato | 1 |
| Ford | DF Motorsport | 43 | Pedro Gomes | 2 |
| Ford | DF Motorsport | 70 | Danilo Dirani | 1 |
| Ford | DF Motorsport | 71 | Raijan Mascarello | 4–10 |
| Ford | DF Motorsport | 72 | Djalma Fogaça | All |
| Ford | Território Motorsport | 44 | Edu Piano | 1–5, 7–10 |

== Calendar and results ==
A ten-round calendar was announced on 10 December 2012. All races were held in Brazil, excepting round at Autódromo Oscar Cabalén, that was held in Argentina.

| Round | Circuit | Date | Pole position | Fastest lap | Winning driver | Winning team |
|---|---|---|---|---|---|---|
| 1 | Autódromo Internacional de Tarumã | March 10 | Wellington Cirino | Wellington Cirino | Wellington Cirino | ABF Mercedes-Benz |
| 2 | Autódromo Internacional Ayrton Senna, Londrina | April 7 | Régis Boessio | Leandro Totti | Paulo Salustiano | ABF Racing Team |
| 3 | Autódromo Internacional Ayrton Senna, Caruaru | May 19 | Leandro Totti | Leandro Totti | Régis Boessio | Boessio Competições |
| 4 | Autódromo Internacional Ayrton Senna, Goiânia | June 9 | Wellington Cirino | Geraldo Piquet | Geraldo Piquet | ABF Mercedes-Benz |
| 5 | Autódromo José Carlos Pace | July 7 | Roberval Andrade | Roberval Andrade | Beto Monteiro | Scuderia Iveco |
| 6 | Autódromo Internacional de Cascavel | August 4 | Felipe Giaffone | Wellington Cirino | Felipe Giaffone | RM Competições |
| 7 | Autódromo Oscar Cabalén | September 8 | Paulo Salustiano | Roberval Andrade | Beto Monteiro | Scuderia Iveco |
| 8 | Autódromo Internacional de Guaporé | October 13 | Paulo Salustiano | Paulo Salustiano | Régis Boessio | Boessio Competições |
| 9 | Autódromo Internacional de Curitiba | November 10 | Felipe Giaffone | Leandro Totti | Felipe Giaffone | RM Competições |
| 10 | Autódromo Internacional Nelson Piquet, Brasília | December 8 | Paulo Salustiano | Leandro Totti | Valmir Benavides | Scuderia Iveco |

Key:

Race forms part of the Brazilian Championship
Race forms part of the Brazilian and the South American Championships

== Championship standings ==
- Points were awarded as follows:

| Pos | 1 | 2 | 3 | 4 | 5 | 6 | 7 | 8 | 9 | 10 | 11 | 12 | 13 | 14 | PP | FL |
|---|---|---|---|---|---|---|---|---|---|---|---|---|---|---|---|---|
| Race | 25 | 20 | 17 | 14 | 12 | 10 | 8 | 7 | 6 | 5 | 4 | 3 | 2 | 1 | **1** | 1 |

=== Drivers' standings ===
==== Brazilian ====
| Pos | Driver | TAR | LON | CAR | GOI | INT | CAS | COR | GUA | CUR | BRA | Pts |
|---|---|---|---|---|---|---|---|---|---|---|---|---|
| 1 | Beto Monteiro | Ret | 6 | 4 ^{5} | 11 ^{3} | 1 ^{3} | 4 ^{5} | 1 ^{2} | 3 ^{1} | 8 ^{4} | 4 | 149 |
| 2 | Leandro Totti | 6 | 20 | **3** ^{1} | 3 | 2 ^{1} | Ret | 5 ^{1} | 16 | 2 ^{1} | 8 ^{1} | 128 |
| 3 | Régis Boessio | 4 ^{5} | **2** ^{1} | 1 ^{3} | 13 | Ret | Ret | 16 | 1 ^{4} | 3 ^{2} | Ret | 119 |
| 4 | Felipe Giaffone | Ret | 18 | Ret | Ret ^{2} | 13 ^{2} | **1** ^{1} | 2 ^{3} | 2 ^{3} | **1** ^{2} | Ret ^{4} | 114 |
| 5 | Geraldo Piquet | 2 ^{3} | | Ret | 1 ^{2} | Ret | 2 ^{2} | 8 | 7 | 6 | Ret | 102 |
| 6 | Paulo Salustiano | 3 ^{4} | 1 ^{2} | 2 ^{4} | Ret ^{5} | Ret | Ret | **Ret**^{1} | **Ret** | 4 ^{5} | **Ret** | 94 |
| 7 | Valmir Benavides | 5 | 11 | 6 | 16 | 4 ^{4} | 5 | 12 | Ret | Ret | 1 ^{2} | 84 |
| 8 | Wellington Cirino | **1** ^{1} | Ret | 13 ^{2} | **Ret**^{1} | 6 | 3 ^{3} | 17 | 8 | Ret | Ret ^{5} | 83 |
| 9 | Roberval Andrade | 17 ^{2} | 7 | Ret | 5 | **Ret** | Ret | 3 ^{4} | 15 | 5 | 2 ^{3} | 81 |
| 10 | Djalma Fogaça | 11 | 16 ^{4} | 7 | 12 | 8 | 7 | Ret | 4 ^{2} | 9 | 3 | 74 |
| 11 | Leandro Reis | Ret | 4 ^{5} | 5 | Ret | 5 | 9 | 4 | Ret | Ret | Ret | 59 |
| 12 | Diogo Pachenki | 9 | 3 ^{3} | 16 | 4 | Ret | 16 | 19 | 6 | 7 | Ret | 58 |
| 13 | André Marques | 12 | 5 | 8 | 14 | 15 ^{5} | 14 ^{4} | 8 | 5 | Ret | Ret | 50 |
| 14 | Alberto Catucci | 8 | 12 | 12 | 7 | 14 | 15 | 13 | 9 | 10 | 7 | 43 |
| 15 | João Maistro | 7 | 8 | 10 | 6 | Ret | Ret | Ret | 10 | 19 | 10 | 41 |
| 16 | Pedro Muffato | | 9 | | Ret | 9 | 12 | Ret | | 12 | 5 | 30 |
| 17 | Ronaldo Kastropil | 10 | 13 | Ret | 10 | Ret | 10 | Ret | 13 | Ret | 8 | 26 |
| 18 | Adalberto Jardim | Ret | Ret | Ret | 2 | Ret | Ret | 18 | DSQ | 11 | Ret | 24 |
| 19 | Rogério Castro | | Ret | 15 | 8 | 7 | 8 | 15 | Ret | 14 | | 23 |
| 20 | Edu Piano | 15 | 17 | 14 | 9 | 10 | | Ret | Ret | 15 | 6 | 22 |
| 21 | Alex Caffi | | | Ret | 15 | 3 | 11 | Ret | Ret | Ret | Ret | 21 |
| 21 | Débora Rodrigues | 13 | 15 | Ret | Ret | Ret | 6 | 10 | 11 | Ret | Ret | 21 |
| 21 | Jansen Bueno | 14 | 10 | Ret | Ret | 11 | 17 | 7 | 12 | 18 | Ret | 21 |
| 24 | José Maria Reis | DNS | 14 | 9 | DNS | 12 | 13 | 14 | Ret | 16 | Ret | 13 |
| 25 | Luiz Lopes | 16 | Ret | 11 | Ret | Ret | Ret | 9 | 17 | 17 | Ret | 10 |
| 26 | Raijan Mascarello | | | | Ret | Ret | Ret | 12 | 14 | 13 | Ret | 6 |
| | Pedro Gomes | | 19 | | | | | | | | | 0 |
| | Danilo Dirani | Ret | Ret | | | | | | | | | 0 |
| | David Muffato | DNS | | | | | | | | | | 0 |
| Pos | Driver | TAR | LON | CAR | GOI | INT | CAS | COR | GUA | CUR | BRA | Pts |

| Colour | Result |
|---|---|
| Gold | Winner |
| Silver | Second place |
| Bronze | Third place |
| Green | Points classification |
| Blue | Non-points classification |
| Blue | Non-classified finish (NC) |
| Purple | Retired, not classified (Ret) |
| Red | Did not qualify (DNQ) |
| Red | Did not pre-qualify (DNPQ) |
| Black | Disqualified (DSQ) |
| White | Did not start (DNS) |
| White | Withdrew (WD) |
| White | Race cancelled (C) |
| Blank | Did not practice (DNP) |
| Blank | Did not arrive (DNA) |
| Blank | Excluded (EX) |

**Bold** – Pole
Italics – Fastest Lap

- Notes:

^{1} ^{2} ^{3} ^{4} ^{5} refers to the classification of the drivers on the yellow flag scheduled, where bonus points are awarded 5–4–3–2–1 and the top five drivers in race ensures a place on the podium.

==== South American ====
| Pos | Driver | TAR | CAR | INT | COR | Pts |
|---|---|---|---|---|---|---|
| 1 | Beto Monteiro | Ret | 4 ^{5} | 1 ^{3} | 1 ^{2} | 72 |
| 2 | Leandro Totti | 6 | **3** ^{1} | 2 ^{1} | 5 ^{1} | 72 |
| 3 | Wellington Cirino | **1** ^{1} | 13 ^{2} | 6 | 17 | 48 |
| 4 | Paulo Salustiano | 3 ^{4} | 2 ^{4} | Ret | **Ret**^{1} | 47 |
| 5 | Régis Boessio | 4 ^{5} | 1 ^{3} | Ret | 16 | 43 |
| 6 | Valmir Benavides | 5 | 6 | 4 ^{4} | 12 | 38 |
| 7 | Leandro Reis | Ret | 5 | 5 | 4 | 38 |
| 8 | Geraldo Piquet | 2 ^{3} | Ret | Ret | 8 | 30 |
| 9 | Felipe Giaffone | Ret | Ret | 13 ^{2} | 2 ^{3} | 29 |
| 10 | Roberval Andrade | 17 ^{2} | Ret | **Ret** | 3 ^{4} | 26 |
| 11 | André Marques | 12 | 8 | 15 ^{5} | 8 | 21 |
| 12 | Djalma Fogaça | 11 | 7 | 8 | Ret | 19 |
| 13 | Alex Caffi | | Ret | 3 | Ret | 17 |
| 14 | João Maistro | 7 | 10 | Ret | Ret | 13 |
| 14 | Jansen Bueno | 14 | Ret | 11 | 7 | 13 |
| 14 | Alberto Catucci | 8 | 12 | 14 | 13 | 13 |
| 17 | José Maria Reis | DNS | 9 | 12 | 14 | 10 |
| 17 | Luiz Lopes | 16 | 11 | Ret | 9 | 10 |
| 19 | Rogério Castro | | Ret | 7 | 15 | 8 |
| 20 | Débora Rodrigues | 13 | Ret | Ret | 10 | 7 |
| 21 | Diogo Pachenki | 9 | 16 | Ret | 19 | 6 |
| 21 | Pedro Muffato | | | 9 | Ret | 6 |
| 21 | Edu Piano | 15 | 14 | 10 | Ret | 6 |
| 24 | Ronaldo Kastropil | 10 | Ret | Ret | Ret | 5 |
| 25 | Raijan Mascarello | | | Ret | 12 | 3 |
| | Adalberto Jardim | Ret | Ret | Ret | Ret | 0 |
| | Danilo Dirani | Ret | | | | 0 |
| | David Muffato | DNS | | | | 0 |
| Pos | Driver | TAR | CAR | INT | COR | Pts |

| Colour | Result |
|---|---|
| Gold | Winner |
| Silver | Second place |
| Bronze | Third place |
| Green | Points classification |
| Blue | Non-points classification |
| Blue | Non-classified finish (NC) |
| Purple | Retired, not classified (Ret) |
| Red | Did not qualify (DNQ) |
| Red | Did not pre-qualify (DNPQ) |
| Black | Disqualified (DSQ) |
| White | Did not start (DNS) |
| White | Withdrew (WD) |
| White | Race cancelled (C) |
| Blank | Did not practice (DNP) |
| Blank | Did not arrive (DNA) |
| Blank | Excluded (EX) |

**Bold** – Pole
Italics – Fastest Lap

=== Manufacturers' standings ===
==== Brazilian ====
| Pos | Manufacturer | TAR | LON | CAR | GOI | INT | CAS | COR | GUA | CUR | BRA | Pts |
|---|---|---|---|---|---|---|---|---|---|---|---|---|
| 1 | Mercedes-Benz | 1 | 1 | 1 | 1 | 6 | 2 | 8 | 1 | 3 | Ret | 350 |
| 1 | Mercedes-Benz | 2 | 2 | 2 | 4 | Ret | 3 | 16 | 6 | 4 | Ret | 350 |
| 1 | Mercedes-Benz | 3 | 3 | 13 | 13 | Ret | 16 | 17 | 7 | 6 | Ret | 350 |
| 2 | MAN | 6 | 5 | 3 | 2 | 2 | 1 | 2 | 2 | 1 | 8 | 280 |
| 2 | MAN | 12 | 15 | 8 | 3 | 13 | 6 | 5 | 5 | 2 | Ret | 280 |
| 2 | MAN | 13 | 20 | Ret | 14 | 15 | 14 | 8 | 11 | 11 | Ret | 280 |
| 3 | Iveco | 5 | 6 | 4 | 4 | 1 | 4 | 1 | 3 | 8 | 1 | 242 |
| 3 | Iveco | 16 | 11 | 6 | 15 | 3 | 5 | 9 | 17 | 17 | 4 | 242 |
| 3 | Iveco | Ret | Ret | 11 | 16 | 4 | 11 | 12 | Ret | Ret | Ret | 242 |
| 4 | Scania | 10 | 4 | 5 | 5 | 5 | 9 | 3 | 13 | 5 | 2 | 191 |
| 4 | Scania | 17 | 7 | 9 | 10 | 9 | 10 | 4 | 15 | 12 | 5 | 191 |
| 4 | Scania | Ret | 9 | Ret | Ret | 12 | 12 | 14 | Ret | 16 | 8 | 191 |
| 5 | Volvo | 7 | 8 | 10 | 6 | 7 | 8 | 7 | 9 | 10 | 7 | 127 |
| 5 | Volvo | 8 | 10 | 12 | 7 | 11 | 15 | 13 | 10 | 14 | 10 | 127 |
| 5 | Volvo | 14 | 12 | 15 | 8 | 14 | 17 | 15 | 12 | 18 | Ret | 127 |
| 6 | Ford | 11 | 16 | 7 | 9 | 8 | 7 | 12 | 4 | 9 | 3 | 68 |
| 6 | Ford | 15 | 17 | 14 | 12 | 10 | Ret | Ret | 14 | 13 | 6 | 68 |
| 6 | Ford | Ret | 19 | | Ret | Ret | Ret | | Ret | 15 | Ret | 68 |
| Pos | Manufacturer | TAR | LON | CAR | GOI | INT | CAS | COR | GUA | CUR | BRA | Pts |

| Colour | Result |
|---|---|
| Gold | Winner |
| Silver | Second place |
| Bronze | Third place |
| Green | Points classification |
| Blue | Non-points classification |
| Blue | Non-classified finish (NC) |
| Purple | Retired, not classified (Ret) |
| Red | Did not qualify (DNQ) |
| Red | Did not pre-qualify (DNPQ) |
| Black | Disqualified (DSQ) |
| White | Did not start (DNS) |
| White | Withdrew (WD) |
| White | Race cancelled (C) |
| Blank | Did not practice (DNP) |
| Blank | Did not arrive (DNA) |
| Blank | Excluded (EX) |

==== South American ====
| Pos | Manufacturer | TAR | CAR | INT | COR | Pts |
|---|---|---|---|---|---|---|
| 1 | Iveco | 5 | 4 | 1 | 1 | 131 |
| 1 | Iveco | 16 | 6 | 3 | 9 | 131 |
| 1 | Iveco | Ret | 11 | 4 | 12 | 131 |
| 2 | Mercedes-Benz | 1 | 1 | 6 | 8 | 126 |
| 2 | Mercedes-Benz | 2 | 2 | Ret | 16 | 126 |
| 2 | Mercedes-Benz | 3 | 13 | Ret | 17 | 126 |
| 3 | MAN | 6 | 3 | 2 | 2 | 103 |
| 3 | MAN | 12 | 8 | 5 | 5 | 103 |
| 3 | MAN | 13 | Ret | 15 | 8 | 103 |
| 4 | Scania | 10 | 5 | 5 | 3 | 76 |
| 4 | Scania | 17 | 9 | 9 | 4 | 76 |
| 4 | Scania | Ret | Ret | 12 | 14 | 76 |
| 5 | Volvo | 7 | 10 | 7 | 7 | 47 |
| 5 | Volvo | 8 | 12 | 11 | 13 | 47 |
| 5 | Volvo | 14 | 15 | 14 | 15 | 47 |
| 6 | Ford | 11 | 9 | 8 | 12 | 27 |
| 6 | Ford | 15 | 14 | 10 | Ret | 27 |
| 6 | Ford | Ret | | Ret | Ret | 27 |
| Pos | Manufacturer | TAR | CAR | INT | COR | Pts |

| Colour | Result |
|---|---|
| Gold | Winner |
| Silver | Second place |
| Bronze | Third place |
| Green | Points classification |
| Blue | Non-points classification |
| Blue | Non-classified finish (NC) |
| Purple | Retired, not classified (Ret) |
| Red | Did not qualify (DNQ) |
| Red | Did not pre-qualify (DNPQ) |
| Black | Disqualified (DSQ) |
| White | Did not start (DNS) |
| White | Withdrew (WD) |
| White | Race cancelled (C) |
| Blank | Did not practice (DNP) |
| Blank | Did not arrive (DNA) |
| Blank | Excluded (EX) |
