= 2012 Fórmula Truck season =

17th Brazilian Fórmula Truck season

2012 Fórmula Truck

Seasons
- ← 2011 2013 →

The 2012 Fórmula Truck season was the 17th Fórmula Truck season. It began on March 4 at Velopark, and ended on December 9 at Brasília after ten rounds. All ten rounds counted towards the Brazilian title, with four rounds counting towards the South American title.

Mercedes-Benz driver Leandro Totti won the South American and Brazilian Championship.

== Teams and drivers ==
All drivers were Brazilian-registered, excepting Luis Pucci, who raced under Argentine racing license.

Manufacturer	Team	No.	Driver	Rounds
Iveco	Scuderia Iveco	2	Valmir Benavides	All
Iveco	Scuderia Iveco	88	Beto Monteiro	All
Iveco	Marinelli Competições	18	João Ometto	8–10
Iveco	Marinelli Competições	50	Fred Marinelli	1–6
Mercedes-Benz	ABF Mercedes-Benz	3	Christian Fittipaldi	1–2
Mercedes-Benz	ABF Mercedes-Benz	3	Geraldo Piquet	3–10
Mercedes-Benz	ABF Mercedes-Benz	6	Wellington Cirino	All
Mercedes-Benz	ABF Racing Team	73	Leandro Totti	All
Mercedes-Benz	ABF Racing Team	99	Luiz Lopes	All
Mercedes-Benz	ABF Desenvolvimento Team	83	Régis Boessio	All
Volkswagen	RM Competições	4	Felipe Giaffone	All
Volkswagen	RM Competições	7	Débora Rodrigues	All
Volkswagen	RM Competições	9	Renato Martins	All
Volkswagen	RM Competições	77	André Marques	All
Volkswagen	AJ5 Motorsport	8	Adalberto Jardim	All
Scania	Ticket Car Corinthians Motorsport	10	Alberto Catucci	9–10
Scania	Ticket Car Corinthians Motorsport	15	Roberval Andrade	All
Scania	Original Reis Peças	12	José Maria Reis	1–6, 9–10
Scania	Original Reis Peças	45	Leandro Reis	1–6, 8–10
Scania	Muffatão Racing	20	Pedro Muffato	All
Volvo	DB Motorsport	11	Diumar Bueno	1–8
Volvo	Clay Truck Racing	14	João Maistro	1–6, 8–10
Volvo	ABF Volvo	32	Luis Pucci	All
Volvo	ABF Volvo	55	Paulo Salustiano	All
Ford	DF Motorsport	43	Pedro Gomes	All
Ford	DF Motorsport	70	Danilo Dirani	All
Ford	DF Motorsport	72	Djalma Fogaça	8–10

== Calendar ==
All races were held in Brazil, excepting round at Autódromo Oscar Cabalén, that was held in Argentina.

Round	Circuit	Date
1	Velopark, Nova Santa Rita	March 4
2	Autódromo Internacional Nelson Piquet, Rio de Janeiro	April 1
3	Autódromo Internacional Ayrton Senna, Caruaru	May 6
4	Autódromo Internacional Ayrton Senna, Goiânia	June 3
5	Autódromo José Carlos Pace	July 8
6	Autódromo Internacional de Cascavel	August 5
7	Autódromo Oscar Cabalén	September 9
8	Autódromo Internacional de Guaporé	October 14
9	Autódromo Internacional de Curitiba	November 11
10	Autódromo Internacional Nelson Piquet, Brasília	December 9

Key:

Brazilian championship
Both championships (Brazilian and South American)

== Results ==
Round	Circuit	Date	Pole position	Fastest lap	Winning driver	Winning team
1	Velopark	March 4	Beto Monteiro	Leandro Totti	Beto Monteiro	Scuderia Iveco
2	Jacarepaguá	April 1	Christian Fittipaldi	Felipe Giaffone	Beto Monteiro	Scuderia Iveco
3	Caruaru	May 6	Wellington Cirino	Felipe Giaffone	Wellington Cirino	ABF Mercedes-Benz
4	Goiânia	June 3	Leandro Reis	Geraldo Piquet	Leandro Totti	ABF Racing Team
5	Interlagos	July 8	Valmir Benavides	Beto Monteiro	Leandro Totti	ABF Racing Team
6	Cascavel	August 5	Beto Monteiro	Wellington Cirino	Leandro Totti	ABF Racing Team
7	Córdoba	September 9	Felipe Giaffone	Felipe Giaffone	Felipe Giaffone	RM Competições
8	Guaporé	October 14	Régis Boessio	Roberval Andrade	Leandro Totti	ABF Racing Team
9	Curitiba	November 11	Leandro Reis	Leandro Totti	Leandro Totti	ABF Racing Team
10	Brasília	December 9	Roberval Andrade	Leandro Totti	Leandro Totti	ABF Racing Team

== Championship standings ==
- Points were awarded as follows:

Pos	1	2	3	4	5	6	7	8	9	10	11	12	13	14	PP	FL
Race	25	20	17	14	12	10	8	7	6	5	4	3	2	1	**1**	1

=== Brazilian ===
==== Drivers' standings ====
Pos	Driver	VEL	RIO	CAR	GOI	INT	CAS	COR	GUA	CUR	BRA	Pts
1	Leandro Totti	Ret ^{1}	Ret	5	1 ^{1}	1 ^{1}	1 ^{2}	3 ^{1}	1 ^{2}	1 ^{5}	1 ^{1}	216
2	Felipe Giaffone	2 ^{4}	7 ^{3}	Ret	Ret ^{3}	8	2 ^{3}	**1** ^{2}	3 ^{3}	3 ^{2}	4	154
3	Beto Monteiro	**1** ^{2}	1 ^{1}	3 ^{4}	8 ^{5}	9	**Ret**	8 ^{3}	15 ^{5}	15	2 ^{4}	128
4	Roberval Andrade	17	2 ^{2}	6	12	2 ^{2}	Ret	Ret ^{4}	5	2 ^{1}	**Ret**	102
4	André Marques	3	3	2 ^{2}	Ret	6 ^{3}	Ret	6	16	4	8	102
6	Wellington Cirino	9 ^{5}	Ret	**1** ^{1}	2 ^{4}	18	Ret ^{1}	Ret	4 ^{4}	8 ^{4}	18	92
7	Paulo Salustiano	5	6	10	5	7	12	2	8	Ret	7	85
8	Régis Boessio	13	Ret	Ret	Ret	4 ^{4}	3 ^{4}	Ret ^{5}	**2** ^{1}	Ret	9 ^{3}	72
9	Adalberto Jardim	4	Ret	8	Ret	3 ^{5}	Ret	Ret	7	12 ^{3}	3 ^{5}	70
10	Valmir Benavides	Ret	10	Ret	7	**5**	9	5	Ret	5	6	66
11	Leandro Reis	10	5 ^{5}	Ret	**6** ^{2}	19	Ret		DNS	**17**	5 ^{2}	50
12	Renato Martins	Ret	4 ^{4}	16 ^{3}	11	Ret	DSQ	7	9	6	14	48
13	Geraldo Piquet			4 ^{5}	Ret	10	4 ^{5}	Ret	6	Ret	Ret	46
14	João Maistro	Ret	8	9	3	21	Ret		Ret	10	10	40
15	Fred Marinelli	7	Ret	12	4	11	6					39
16	Débora Rodrigues	15	9	7	10	14	5	Ret	Ret	Ret	11	36
17	Luiz Lopes	14	12	15	Ret	Ret	Ret	4	11	7	15	30
18	Luis Pucci	8	Ret	13	Ret	16	7	Ret	12	11	16	24
19	Diumar Bueno	6	Ret	Ret	9	20	10	Ret	DNS			21
20	Pedro Muffato	Ret	11		Ret	12	Ret	Ret	10	9	Ret	18
21	Danilo Dirani	16	Ret	11	14	17	11	Ret	Ret	13	13	13
22	José Maria Reis	Ret	Ret	17	13	13	8			Ret	17	11
23	Pedro Gomes	11	Ret	14	Ret	15	Ret	Ret	13	DSQ	DSQ	7
23	Christian Fittipaldi	12 ^{3}	**Ret**									7
25	Djalma Fogaça								Ret	Ret	12	3
26	João Ometto								14	14	Ret	2
	Alberto Catucci									16	Ret	0
Pos	Driver	VEL	RIO	CAR	GOI	INT	CAS	COR	GUA	CUR	BRA	Pts

Colour	Result
Gold	Winner
Silver	Second place
Bronze	Third place
Green	Points classification
Blue	Non-points classification
Blue	Non-classified finish (NC)
Purple	Retired, not classified (Ret)
Red	Did not qualify (DNQ)
Red	Did not pre-qualify (DNPQ)
Black	Disqualified (DSQ)
White	Did not start (DNS)
White	Withdrew (WD)
White	Race cancelled (C)
Blank	Did not practice (DNP)
Blank	Did not arrive (DNA)
Blank	Excluded (EX)

**Bold** – Pole
Italics – Fastest Lap

- Notes:

^{1} ^{2} ^{3} ^{4} ^{5} refers to the classification of the drivers on the yellow flag scheduled, where bonus points are awarded 5–4–3–2–1 and the top five drivers in race ensures a place on the podium.

==== Manufacturers' standings ====
Pos	Manufacturer	VEL	RIO	CAR	GOI	INT	CAS	COR	GUA	CUR	BRA	Pts
1	Mercedes-Benz	9	12	1	1	1	1	3	1	1	1	371
1	Mercedes-Benz	12	Ret	4	2	4	3	4	2	7	9	371
1	Mercedes-Benz	13	Ret	5	Ret	10	4	Ret	4	9	15	371
2	Volkswagen	2	3	2	10	3	2	1	3	3	3	353
2	Volkswagen	3	4	7	11	6	5	6	7	4	4	353
2	Volkswagen	4	7	8	Ret	8	Ret	7	9	6	8	353
3	Iveco	1	1	3	4	5	6	5	14	5	2	213
3	Iveco	7	10	12	7	9	10	8	15	14	6	213
3	Iveco	Ret	Ret	Ret	8	11	Ret		Ret	15	Ret	213
4	Volvo	5	6	9	3	7	8	2	8	10	7	170
4	Volvo	6	8	10	5	16	11	Ret	12	11	10	170
4	Volvo	8	Ret	13	9	20	13	Ret	Ret	Ret	16	170
5	Scania	10	2	6	6	2	9	Ret	5	2	5	153
5	Scania	17	5	17	12	12	Ret	Ret	10	9	17	153
5	Scania	Ret	11	Ret	13	13	Ret		DNS	16	Ret	153
6	Ford	11	Ret	11	14	15	12	Ret	13	13	12	23
6	Ford	16	Ret	14	Ret	17	Ret	Ret	Ret	Ret	13	23
6	Ford								Ret	DSQ	DSQ	23
Pos	Manufacturer	VEL	RIO	CAR	GOI	INT	CAS	COR	GUA	CUR	BRA	Pts

Colour	Result
Gold	Winner
Silver	Second place
Bronze	Third place
Green	Points classification
Blue	Non-points classification
Blue	Non-classified finish (NC)
Purple	Retired, not classified (Ret)
Red	Did not qualify (DNQ)
Red	Did not pre-qualify (DNPQ)
Black	Disqualified (DSQ)
White	Did not start (DNS)
White	Withdrew (WD)
White	Race cancelled (C)
Blank	Did not practice (DNP)
Blank	Did not arrive (DNA)
Blank	Excluded (EX)

=== South American ===
==== Drivers' standings ====
Pos	Driver	VEL	CAR	INT	COR	Pts
1	Leandro Totti	Ret ^{1}	5	1 ^{1}	3 ^{1}	70
2	Beto Monteiro	**1** ^{2}	3 ^{4}	9	8 ^{3}	66
3	André Marques	3	2 ^{2}	6 ^{3}	6	64
4	Felipe Giaffone	2 ^{4}	Ret	8	**1** ^{2}	61
5	Paulo Salustiano	5	10	7	2	45
6	Adalberto Jardim	4	8	3 ^{5}	Ret	39
7	Wellington Cirino	9 ^{5}	**1** ^{1}	18	Ret	38
8	Roberval Andrade	17	6	2 ^{2}	Ret ^{4}	36
9	Valmir Benavides	Ret	Ret	**5**	5	25
10	Geraldo Piquet		4 ^{5}	10	Ret	20
11	Régis Boessio	13	Ret	4 ^{4}	Ret ^{5}	19
12	Luiz Lopes	14	15	Ret	4	15
12	Fred Marinelli	7	12	11		15
14	Renato Martins	Ret	16 ^{3}	Ret	7	11
15	Diumar Bueno	6	Ret	20	Ret	10
16	Débora Rodrigues	15	7	14	Ret	9
16	Luis Pucci	8	13	16	Ret	9
18	João Maistro	Ret	9	21		6
18	Christian Fittipaldi	12 ^{3}				6
20	Leandro Reis	10	Ret	19		5
20	Pedro Gomes	11	14	15	Ret	5
22	Danilo Dirani	16	11	17	Ret	4
23	Pedro Muffato	Ret		12	Ret	3
24	José Maria Reis	Ret	17	13		2
Pos	Driver	VEL	CAR	INT	COR	Pts

Colour	Result
Gold	Winner
Silver	Second place
Bronze	Third place
Green	Points classification
Blue	Non-points classification
Blue	Non-classified finish (NC)
Purple	Retired, not classified (Ret)
Red	Did not qualify (DNQ)
Red	Did not pre-qualify (DNPQ)
Black	Disqualified (DSQ)
White	Did not start (DNS)
White	Withdrew (WD)
White	Race cancelled (C)
Blank	Did not practice (DNP)
Blank	Did not arrive (DNA)
Blank	Excluded (EX)

**Bold** – Pole
Italics – Fastest Lap

- Notes:

^{1} ^{2} ^{3} ^{4} ^{5} refers to the classification of the drivers on the yellow flag scheduled, where bonus points are awarded 5–4–3–2–1 and the top five drivers in race ensures a place on the podium.

==== Manufacturers' standings ====
Pos	Manufacturer	VEL	CAR	INT	COR	Pts
1	Volkswagen	2	2	3	1	163
1	Volkswagen	3	7	6	6	163
1	Volkswagen	4	8	8	7	163
2	Mercedes-Benz	9	1	1	3	137
2	Mercedes-Benz	12	4	4	4	137
2	Mercedes-Benz	13	5	10	Ret	137
3	Iveco	1	3	5	5	94
3	Iveco	7	12	8	8	94
3	Iveco	Ret	2	11		94
4	Volvo	5	9	7	2	70
4	Volvo	6	10	16	Ret	70
4	Volvo	8	13	20	Ret	70
5	Scania	10	6	2	Ret	40
5	Scania	17	17	12	Ret	40
5	Scania	Ret	Ret	13		40
6	Ford	11	11	15	Ret	9
6	Ford	16	14	17	Ret	9
Pos	Manufacturer	VEL	CAR	INT	COR	Pts

Colour	Result
Gold	Winner
Silver	Second place
Bronze	Third place
Green	Points classification
Blue	Non-points classification
Blue	Non-classified finish (NC)
Purple	Retired, not classified (Ret)
Red	Did not qualify (DNQ)
Red	Did not pre-qualify (DNPQ)
Black	Disqualified (DSQ)
White	Did not start (DNS)
White	Withdrew (WD)
White	Race cancelled (C)
Blank	Did not practice (DNP)
Blank	Did not arrive (DNA)
Blank	Excluded (EX)
