= 2010 Fórmula Truck season =

2010 Fórmula Truck

Seasons
- ← 2009 2011 →

The 2010 Fórmula Truck season was the 15th Fórmula Truck season. It began on March 7 at Guaporé and ended on December 5 at Brasília after ten rounds.

After a closely fought championship, it was the Scania of Roberval Andrade, driving for the RVR Corinthians Motorsport that won his second Fórmula Truck title after a season-long battle with the RM Competições Volkswagen of defending champion Felipe Giaffone. Andrade and Giaffone finished tied on 176 points but with five wins compared to Giaffone's one, Andrade claimed his first title since 2002. Third place went to the best Mercedes-Benz driver, four-time champion Wellington Cirino, who finished 34 points behind the top two taking a single victory at Campo Grande. Other victories were taken by Giaffone's team-mate Valmir Benavides, who triumphed at Caruaru, Geraldo Piquet won the series' only race outside of Brazil in Buenos Aires, while Iveco took a solitary victory with Beto Monteiro winning at Velopark. Volkswagen won the Manufacturers' Championship by 57 points ahead of Scania.

== Teams and drivers ==
All drivers were Brazilian-registered.

Manufacturer	Team	No	Driver	Rounds
Volkswagen	RM Competições	2	Valmir Benavides	All
Volkswagen	RM Competições	4	Felipe Giaffone	All
Volkswagen	RM Competições	7	Débora Rodrigues	All
Volkswagen	RM Competições	9	Renato Martins	All
Mercedes-Benz	ABF Mercedes-Benz	3	Geraldo Piquet	All
Mercedes-Benz	ABF Mercedes-Benz	6	Wellington Cirino	All
Mercedes-Benz	Mercalf Competições	21	José Cangueiro	2–10
Mercedes-Benz	ABF Competições	73	Leandro Totti	All
Ford	DF Motorsport	8	Bruno Junqueira	All
Ford	DF Motorsport	46	Andersom Toso	All
Ford	DF Motorsport	56	Danilo Dirani	All
Ford	ABF Ford	10	Viginaldo Fizio	All
Ford	ABF Ford	28	Fabiano Brito	All
Volvo	ABF Volvo	11	Diumar Bueno	1–5, 7–10
Volvo	ABF Volvo	55	Paulo Salustiano	All
Volvo	Clay Truck Racing	14	João Maistro	All
Volvo	Boessio/AJ5	23	Adalberto Jardim	All
Scania	Original Reis Peças	12	José Maria Reis	All
Scania	Original Reis Peças	51	Leandro Reis	All
Scania	Muffatão Racing	20	Pedro Mulffato	All
Scania	RVR Corinthians Motorsport	77	André Marques	2–10
Scania	RVR Corinthians Motorsport	100	Roberval Andrade	All
Iveco	Scuderia Iveco	33	Cristiano da Matta	All
Iveco	Scuderia Iveco	88	Beto Monteiro	All
Iveco	Marinelli Competições	50	Fred Marinelli	1–3, 5–10

== Race calendar and results ==
All races were held in Brazil, excepting round at Autódromo Juan y Oscar Gálvez, that was held in Argentina.

Round	Circuit	Date	Pole position	Fastest lap	Winning driver	Winning team
1	Autódromo Internacional de Guaporé	March 7	Roberval Andrade	Felipe Giaffone	Felipe Giaffone	RM Competições
2	Autódromo Internacional Nelson Piquet, Rio de Janeiro	April 18	Danilo Dirani	Danilo Dirani	Roberval Andrade	RVR Corinthians Motorsport
3	Autódromo Internacional Ayrton Senna, Caruaru	May 16	Valmir Benavides	Valmir Benavides	Valmir Benavides	RM Competições
4	Autódromo Internacional Orlando Moura	June 26	Leandro Reis	Roberval Andrade	Wellington Cirino	ABF Mercedes-Benz
5	Autódromo José Carlos Pace	July 25	Roberval Andrade	Leandro Reis	Roberval Andrade	RVR Corinthians Motorsport
6	Autódromo Internacional Ayrton Senna, Londrina	August 22	Danilo Dirani	Felipe Giaffone	Roberval Andrade	RVR Corinthians Motorsport
7	Autódromo Juan y Oscar Gálvez	September 19	Roberval Andrade	Valmir Benavides	Geraldo Piquet	ABF Mercedes-Benz
8	Velopark, Nova Santa Rita	October 10	Beto Monteiro	Roberval Andrade	Beto Monteiro	Scuderia Iveco
9	Autódromo Internacional de Curitiba	November 14	Roberval Andrade	Felipe Giaffone	Roberval Andrade	RVR Corinthians Motorsport
10	Autódromo Internacional Nelson Piquet, Brasília	December 5	Roberval Andrade	Roberval Andrade	Roberval Andrade	RVR Corinthians Motorsport

== Championship standings ==
- Points were awarded as follows:

Pos	1	2	3	4	5	6	7	8	9	10	11	12	13	14	PP	FL
Race	25	20	17	14	12	10	8	7	6	5	4	3	2	1	**1**	1
12th Lap	5	4	3	2	1	0										

=== Drivers' championship ===
Pos	Driver	Truck	GUA	RIO	CAR	CAM	INT	LON	JOG	VEL	CUR	BRA	Extra	Points
1	Roberval Andrade	Scania	**18**	1	Ret	Ret	**1**	1	**Ret**	15	**1**	**1**	43	176
2	Felipe Giaffone	Volkswagen	1	5	2	3	4	3	2	Ret	2	4	14	176
3	Wellington Cirino	Mercedes-Benz	3	4	4	1	5	Ret	15	3	4	3	12	142
4	Valmir Benavides	Volkswagen	2	3	**1**	2	Ret	4	Ret	Ret	Ret	5	21	132
5	Geraldo Piquet	Mercedes-Benz	6	Ret	3	9	9	6	1	2	11	10	11	114
6	Beto Monteiro	Iveco	Ret	Ret	6	7	7	7	16	**1**	Ret	2	10	90
7	Renato Martins	Volkswagen	Ret	6	5	16	6	5	10	4	Ret	6	1	74
8	Leandro Totti	Mercedes-Benz	8	Ret	11	15	2	Ret	Ret	Ret	3	DSQ	13	61
8	Pedro Muffato	Scania	12	15	9	6	8	12	5	5	Ret	7		61
10	Leandro Reis	Scania	4	2	Ret	**Ret**	18	Ret	11	13	Ret	13	15	59
11	Adalberto Jardim	Volvo	7	Ret	Ret	8	Ret	9	3	Ret	5	14	4	55
12	Paulo Salustiano	Volvo	11	7	16	4	3	Ret	Ret	DSQ	8	12	1	54
13	André Marques	Scania		11	12	5	11	17	4	6	Ret	Ret		47
14	Danilo Dirani	Ford	5	**Ret**	14	10	19	**2**	Ret	Ret	Ret	16	3	44
15	Fred Marinelli	Iveco	13	12	13		10	8	6	11	6	Ret		43
16	Débora Rodrigues	Volkswagen	17	8	10	14	14	Ret	Ret	9	7	8		35
17	Bruno Junqueira	Ford	14	16	7	Ret	Ret	16	14	16	9	9		22
17	José Maria Reis	Scania	Ret	19	8	Ret	Ret	11	9	14	13	Ret	2	22
19	João Maistro	Volvo	10	Ret	Ret	Ret	16	14	7	8	Ret	Ret		21
20	Fabiano Brito	Ford	Ret	14	Ret	Ret	15	10	Ret	7	10	Ret		19
20	Diumar Bueno	Volvo	9	9	Ret	11	Ret		Ret	Ret	12	17		19
22	José Cangueiro	Mercedes-Benz		10	Ret	13	17	Ret	12	10	Ret	Ret		15
23	Cristiano da Matta	Iveco	16	13	Ret	Ret	13	13	8	Ret	Ret	15		13
24	Andersom Toso	Ford	Ret	Ret	15	12	Ret	15	13	12	Ret	Ret		8
25	Viginaldo Fizio	Ford	15	DSQ	Ret	Ret	12	Ret	Ret	Ret	DSQ	11		7
Pos	Driver	Truck	GUA	RIO	CAR	CAM	INT	LON	JOG	VEL	CUR	BRA	Extra	Points

Colour	Result
Gold	Winner
Silver	Second place
Bronze	Third place
Green	Points classification
Blue	Non-points classification
Blue	Non-classified finish (NC)
Purple	Retired, not classified (Ret)
Red	Did not qualify (DNQ)
Red	Did not pre-qualify (DNPQ)
Black	Disqualified (DSQ)
White	Did not start (DNS)
White	Withdrew (WD)
White	Race cancelled (C)
Blank	Did not practice (DNP)
Blank	Did not arrive (DNA)
Blank	Excluded (EX)

**Bold** – Pole
Italics – Fastest Lap

Notes

The top five after the race ensures a place on the podium.

=== Manufacturers' championship ===
Pos	Make	GUA	RIO	CAR	CAM	INT	LON	JOG	VEL	CUR	BRA	Points
1	Volkswagen	54	42	68	41	25	46	30	23	32	37	398
2	Scania	23	58	16	28	42	36	32	28	33	45	341
3	Mercedes-Benz	36	20	41	36	43	16	32	45	39	24	332
4	Iveco	2	5	12	8	15	17	17	34	12	24	146
5	Volvo	19	14	0	25	19	7	27	7	23	4	145
6	Ford	13	3	9	8	2	29	3	11	11	11	100
Pos	Make	GUA	RIO	CAR	CAM	INT	LON	JOG	VEL	CUR	BRA	Points

Notes

Three best trucks of each make.
