= 2004 Fórmula Truck season =

9th Season of Fórmula Truck

2004 Fórmula Truck

Seasons
- ← 2003 2005 →

The 2004 Fórmula Truck season was the 9th Fórmula Truck season. It began on March 14 at Caruaru and ended on December 5 at Brasília.

== Drivers and Teams ==
No.	Driver	Team / Entry	Manufacturer	Rounds
2	"Mad Macarrão"	Londrina Truck Racing	Ford	All rounds
3	Geraldo Piquet	ABF Mercedes-Benz	Mercedes-Benz	All rounds
5	Herberto Heinen	TRG Competições	Volvo	All rounds
6	Wellington Cirino	ABF Mercedes-Benz	Mercedes-Benz	All rounds
7	Débora Rodrigues	RM Competições	Volkswagen	All rounds
8	Jonatas Borlenghi	RM Competições	Volkswagen	All rounds
9	Renato Martins	RM Competições	Volkswagen	All rounds
10	Vignaldo Fízio	ABF Mercalf	Mercedes-Benz	All rounds
11	Diumar Bueno	Bueno Race Team	Volvo	All rounds
12	Jorge Fleck	Fleck Motorsport	Volvo	Rounds 2–9
13	Fabiano Brito	ABF Volvo	Volvo	Rounds 3–9
15	Roberval Andrade	Muffato-Andrade Motorsport	Scania	All rounds
17	Beto Napolitano	RM Competições	Volkswagen	All rounds
18	Thiago Grison	TRG Competições	Volvo	Rounds 3–9
19	Danusa Moura	Scuderia Forza	Iveco	Rounds 3–9
20	Pedro Muffato	Muffato-Andrade Motorsport	Scania	All rounds
21	José Cangueiro	ABF Mercalf	Mercedes-Benz	All rounds
22	Luís Carlos Zappelini	Campello Competições	Scania / Volkswagen	All rounds
27	Luiz Carlos Lanzoni	Campello Competições	Scania / Volkswagen	Rounds 3–9
35	Luiz Fernando Simões	Sonic Truck Racing	Scania	Rounds 3–9
50	Fred Marinelli	Marinelli Competições	Scania	All rounds
70	Gene Fireball / Fabiano Sperafico	DF Motorsport	Ford	Fireball: Rounds 1–3 / Sperafico: Rounds 4–9
72	Djalma Fogaça	DF Motorsport	Ford	All rounds
73	Leandro Totti	Londrina Truck Racing	Ford	All rounds
88	Beto Monteiro	DF Motorsport	Ford	All rounds

== Calendar and results ==
All races were held in Brazil.

Round	Circuit	Date	Winning driver	Winning manufacturer
1	Autódromo Internacional Ayrton Senna, Caruaru	March 14	Beto Monteiro	Ford
2	Autódromo Internacional de Guaporé	April 4	Wellington Cirino	Mercedes-Benz
3	Autódromo José Carlos Pace	May 16	Roberval Andrade	Scania
4	Autódromo Internacional Ayrton Senna, Goiânia	June 6	Beto Monteiro	Ford
5	Autódromo Internacional Orlando Moura	July 18	Leandro Totti	Ford
6	Autódromo Internacional Ayrton Senna, Londrina	August 22	Beto Monteiro	Ford
7	Autódromo Internacional de Cascavel	September 19	Wellington Cirino	Mercedes-Benz
8	Autódromo Internacional de Tarumã	November 7	Djalma Fogaça	Ford
9	Autódromo Internacional Nelson Piquet, Brasília	December 5	Renato Martins	Volkswagen

== Final standings ==
Pos.	Driver	Team	Points
1	Beto Monteiro	DF Motorsport	129
2	Wellington Cirino	ABF Mercedes-Benz	120
3	Roberval Andrade	Muffato-Andrade Motorsport	117
4	Renato Martins	RM Competições	105
5	Jonatas Borlenghi	RM Competições	100
6	Djalma Fogaça	DF Motorsport	62
7	Leandro Totti	Londrina Truck Racing	54
8	Geraldo Piquet	ABF Mercedes-Benz	49
9	Vignaldo Fízio	ABF Pacaembu / Mercalf	39
10	Jorge Fleck	Fleck Motorsport	31
11	Beto Napolitano	RM Competições	27
12	Fred Marinelli	Marinelli Competições	24
13	“Mad Macarrão” (Eduardo Fráguas)	Londrina Truck Racing	20
14	Débora Rodrigues	RM Competições	17
15	Fabiano Brito	ABF Volvo	10
16	Pedro Muffato	Muffato-Andrade Motorsport	9
17	José Cangueiro	ABF Mercalf	7
18	Diumar Bueno	Bueno Race Team	5
19	Fabiano Sperafico	DF Motorsport	3
20	Thiago Grison	TRG Competições	2
21	Luís Carlos Zappelini	Campello Competições	1
22	Valmir Candeu	TRG Competições	0
–	Gene Fireball	DF Motorsport	0
–	José Carlos Franzói	Equipe Fal	0
–	Herberto Heinen	TRG Competições	0
–	Luiz Carlos Lanzoni	Campello Competições	0
–	Danusa Moura	Scuderia Forza	0
–	Luiz Fernando Simões	Sonic Truck Racing	0
