= 2011 Fórmula Truck season =

2011 Fórmula Truck

Seasons
- ← 2010 2012 →

The 2011 Fórmula Truck season was the 16th Fórmula Truck season, the South American championship began on February 27 at Santa Cruz do Sul, while Brazilian Championship on April 3 in Rio de Janeiro and ended on December 4 at Brasília after ten rounds.

Felipe Giaffone and Volkswagen won the title of South American and Brazilian championships.

== Teams and drivers ==
All drivers were Brazilian-registered, excepting Luis Pucci, who raced under Argentine racing license.

Manufacturer	Team	No.	Driver	Rounds
Scania	Ticket Car Corinthians Motorsport	1	Roberval Andrade	All
Scania	Ticket Car Corinthians Motorsport	99	Luiz Lopes	All
Scania	Original Reis Peças	12	José Maria Reis	1–7, 9–10
Scania	Original Reis Peças	45	Leandro Reis	1–7, 9–10
Scania	Muffatão Racing	20	Pedro Muffato	1–6, 8–10
Volkswagen	RM Competições	2	Valmir Benavides	All
Volkswagen	RM Competições	4	Felipe Giaffone	All
Volkswagen	RM Competições	7	Débora Rodrigues	All
Volkswagen	RM Competições	9	Renato Martins	All
Volkswagen	AJ5 Motorsport	23	Adalberto Jardim	3–10
Mercedes-Benz	ABF Mercedes-Benz	3	Geraldo Piquet	All
Mercedes-Benz	ABF Mercedes-Benz	6	Wellington Cirino	All
Mercedes-Benz	ABF Desenvolvimento Team	73	Leandro Totti	All
Mercedes-Benz	ABF Desenvolvimento Team	83	Régis Boessio	All
Mercedes-Benz	ABF Grêmio Competições	100	Gérson Trindade	3
Mercedes-Benz	ABF Grêmio Competições	100	Pedro Gomes	5–6
Mercedes-Benz	ABF Grêmio Competições	100	Viginaldo Fizio	7–10
Volvo	DB Motorsport	11	Diumar Bueno	2–10
Volvo	Clay Truck Racing	14	João Maistro	1–6, 8–10
Volvo	TNT Energy Team	32	Luis Pucci	1–2, 4–10
Volvo	TNT Energy Team	77	André Marques	All
Ford	AJ5 Motorsport	23	Adalberto Jardim	1–2
Ford	DF Motorsport	70	Danilo Dirani	All
Ford	DF Motorsport	71	Cristina Rosito	All
Iveco	Marinelli Competições	50	Fred Marinelli	1–2, 4–10
Iveco	Scuderia Iveco	55	Paulo Salustiano	All
Iveco	Scuderia Iveco	88	Beto Monteiro	All

== Calendar ==
For the 2011 season of Fórmula Truck was created the South American Championship with three races, the first in Santa Cruz do Sul along with the Top Race, the second at Interlagos and the third in Argentina on Juan y Oscar Gálvez also with Top Race. Two changes occurred in the calendar, Santa Cruz do Sul replaces Velopark and Campo Grande leaves the calendar for the return to Goiânia.

Round	Circuit	Date
1	Autódromo Internacional de Santa Cruz do Sul	February 27
2	Autódromo Internacional Nelson Piquet, Rio de Janeiro	April 3
3	Autódromo Internacional Ayrton Senna, Caruaru	May 15
4	Autódromo Internacional Ayrton Senna, Goiânia	June 5
5	Autódromo José Carlos Pace	July 3
6	Autódromo Internacional Ayrton Senna, Londrina	August 7
7	Autódromo Juan y Oscar Gálvez	September 4
8	Autódromo Internacional de Guaporé	October 9
9	Autódromo Internacional de Curitiba	November 6
10	Autódromo Internacional Nelson Piquet, Brasília	December 4

Key:

Brazilian championship
South American championship

== Results ==
Round	Circuit	Date	Pole position	Fastest lap	Winning driver	Winning team
1	Santa Cruz do Sul	February 27	Beto Monteiro	Leandro Totti	Felipe Giaffone	RM Competições
2	Jacarepaguá	April 3	Felipe Giaffone	Danilo Dirani	Geraldo Piquet	ABF Mercedes-Benz
3	Caruaru	May 15	Felipe Giaffone	Felipe Giaffone	Felipe Giaffone	RM Competições
4	Goiânia	June 5	Roberval Andrade	Roberval Andrade	Wellington Cirino	ABF Mercedes-Benz
5	Interlagos	July 3	Felipe Giaffone	Danilo Dirani	Felipe Giaffone	RM Competições
6	Londrina	August 8	Felipe Giaffone	Geraldo Piquet	Felipe Giaffone	RM Competições
7	Buenos Aires	September 4	Valmir Benavides	Roberval Andrade	Geraldo Piquet	ABF Mercedes-Benz
8	Guaporé	October 9	Diumar Bueno	Roberval Andrade	Valmir Benavides	RM Competições
9	Curitiba	November 6	Danilo Dirani	Danilo Dirani	Danilo Dirani	DF Motorsport
10	Brasília	December 4	Wellington Cirino	Leandro Totti	Felipe Giaffone	RM Competições

== Championship standings ==
- Points were awarded as follows:

Pos	1	2	3	4	5	6	7	8	9	10	11	12	13	14	PP	FL
Race	25	20	17	14	12	10	8	7	6	5	4	3	2	1	**1**	1
12th Lap	5	4	3	2	1	0										

=== Drivers' championships ===
==== Brazilian ====
Pos	Driver	Truck	RIO	CAR	GOI	LON	GUA	CUR	BRA	Extra	Points
1	Felipe Giaffone	Volkswagen	**Ret**	**1**	19	**1**	2	11	1	19	122
2	Geraldo Piquet	Mercedes-Benz	1	Ret	2	2	3	DSQ	12	6	89
3	Valmir Benavides	Volkswagen	Ret	5	4	3	1	Ret	4	6	88
4	Régis Boessio	Mercedes-Benz	4	7	3	Ret	16	5	2	1	72
5	Wellington Cirino	Mercedes-Benz	2	Ret	1	7	Ret	Ret	**Ret**	15	69
6	Renato Martins	Volkswagen	Ret	2	17	5	5	8	6	2	63
7	Leandro Totti	Mercedes-Benz	6	13	5	12	4	4	Ret	5	61
8	Danilo Dirani	Ford	15	6	8	Ret	Ret	**1**	Ret	11	56
9	Beto Monteiro	Iveco	5	Ret	11	Ret	Ret	2	9	12	54
10	João Maistro	Volvo	3	9	10	Ret	7	6	Ret		46
11	Adalberto Jardim	Ford	Ret							3	43
11	Adalberto Jardim	Volkswagen		12	6	Ret	6	3	DNS	3	43
12	Pedro Muffato	Scania	8	14	20	11	15	7	3		37
13	Fred Marinelli	Iveco	Ret		7	4	14	Ret	5		35
14	André Marques	Volvo	7	10	12	Ret	9	12	13	2	30
15	Roberval Andrade	Scania	Ret	Ret	**9**	Ret	Ret	Ret	11	13	26
16	Leandro Reis	Scania	13	4	Ret	13		Ret	Ret	7	25
17	Paulo Salustiano	Iveco	Ret	3	Ret	Ret	11	DSQ	Ret	3	24
18	Luis Pucci	Volvo	9		14	Ret	13	10	7		23
19	Luiz Lopes	Scania	10	Ret	18	6	17	13	10		22
20	Débora Rodrigues	Volkswagen	14	8	13	10	10	Ret	Ret		20
21	Cristina Rosito	Ford	11	Ret	Ret	8	12	9	DNS		19
22	Diumar Bueno	Volvo	12	Ret	16	9	**8**	Ret	Ret		17
23	José Maria Reis	Scania	Ret	Ret	15	Ret		Ret	8		7
24	Gerson Trindade	Mercedes-Benz		11							4
	Viginaldo Fizio	Mercedes-Benz					Ret	DNS	Ret		0
	Pedro Gomes	Mercedes-Benz				Ret					0
Pos	Driver	Truck	RIO	CAR	GOI	LON	GUA	CUR	BRA	Extra	Points

Colour	Result
Gold	Winner
Silver	Second place
Bronze	Third place
Green	Points classification
Blue	Non-points classification
Blue	Non-classified finish (NC)
Purple	Retired, not classified (Ret)
Red	Did not qualify (DNQ)
Red	Did not pre-qualify (DNPQ)
Black	Disqualified (DSQ)
White	Did not start (DNS)
White	Withdrew (WD)
White	Race cancelled (C)
Blank	Did not practice (DNP)
Blank	Did not arrive (DNA)
Blank	Excluded (EX)

**Bold** – Pole
Italics – Fastest Lap

Notes

The top five after the race ensures a place on the podium.

Piquet scored no points in Brasília.

==== South American ====
Pos	Driver	Truck	SCS	INT	JOG	Extra	Points
1	Felipe Giaffone	Volkswagen	1	**1**	10	10	66
2	Danilo Dirani	Ford	2	4	3	3	55
3	Geraldo Piquet	Mercedes-Benz	Ret	5	1	5	42
4	Valmir Benavides	Volkswagen	5	3	**14**	6	37
5	Roberval Andrade	Scania	4	6	9	2	33
6	Adalberto Jardim	Ford	12			5	32
6	Adalberto Jardim	Volkswagen		8	2	5	32
7	Renato Martins	Volkswagen	3	20	5	2	31
8	Beto Monteiro	Iveco	**6**	10	11	8	28
9	André Marques	Volvo	10	9	4		26
10	Wellington Cirino	Mercedes-Benz	Ret	2	DNS	4	24
11	Paulo Salustiano	Iveco	7	7	Ret		16
12	Débora Rodrigues	Volkswagen	8	11	12		14
13	José Maria Reis	Scania	14	14	6		12
14	Régis Boessio	Mercedes-Benz	9	12	Ret		9
14	Luis Pucci	Volvo	15	13	8		9
16	Fred Marinelli	Iveco	17	DSQ	7		8
17	Leandro Totti	Mercedes-Benz	11	16	Ret		5
18	Cristina Rosito	Ford	13	17	Ret		2
18	Luiz Lopes	Scania	Ret	19	13		2
	Diumar Bueno	Volvo		15	15		0
	João Maistro	Volvo	16	Ret			0
	Leandro Reis	Scania	Ret	18	Ret		0
	Pedro Muffato	Scania	Ret	Ret			0
	Viginaldo Fizio	Mercedes-Benz			Ret		0
	Pedro Gomes	Mercedes-Benz		Ret			0
Pos	Driver	Truck	SCS	INT	JOG	Extra	Points

Colour	Result
Gold	Winner
Silver	Second place
Bronze	Third place
Green	Points classification
Blue	Non-points classification
Blue	Non-classified finish (NC)
Purple	Retired, not classified (Ret)
Red	Did not qualify (DNQ)
Red	Did not pre-qualify (DNPQ)
Black	Disqualified (DSQ)
White	Did not start (DNS)
White	Withdrew (WD)
White	Race cancelled (C)
Blank	Did not practice (DNP)
Blank	Did not arrive (DNA)
Blank	Excluded (EX)

**Bold** – Pole
Italics – Fastest Lap

=== Manufacturers' championships ===
==== Brazilian ====
Pos	Manufacturer	RIO	CAR	GOI	LON	GUA	CUR	BRA	Points
1	Volkswagen	1	57	26	54	57	28	49	272
2	Mercedes-Benz	59	14	62	31	31	26	20	243
3	Volvo	31	11	9	6	21	19	11	108
4	Iveco	12	17	12	14	5	20	18	98
5	Scania	14	15	6	16	0	10	29	90
6	Ford	4	10	7	7	3	30	0	61
Pos	Manufacturer	RIO	CAR	GOI	LON	GUA	CUR	BRA	Points

Notes

Three best trucks of each brand.

==== South American ====
Pos	Manufacturer	SCS	INT	JOG	Points
1	Volkswagen	54	49	37	141
2	Mercedes-Benz	10	35	25	70
3	Ford	25	14	17	56
4	Scania	15	11	18	44
5	Iveco	18	13	12	43
6	Volvo	5	8	22	35
Pos	Manufacturer	SCS	INT	JOG	Points
