= 2005 Fórmula Truck season =

2005 Fórmula Truck

Seasons
- ← 2004 2006 →

The 2005 Fórmula Truck season was the 10th Fórmula Truck season. It began on March 13 at Caruaru and ended on December 11 at Brasília.

== Calendar and results ==
All races were held in Brazil.

| Round | Circuit | Date | Winning driver | Winning manufacturer |
|---|---|---|---|---|
| 1 | Autódromo Internacional Ayrton Senna, Caruaru | March 13 | Beto Napolitano | Volkswagen |
| 2 | Autódromo Internacional Ayrton Senna, Goiânia | April 10 | Wellington Cirino | Mercedes-Benz |
| 3 | Autódromo José Carlos Pace | May 15 | Leandro Totti | Ford |
| 4 | Autódromo Internacional de Guaporé | June 5 | Wellington Cirino | Mercedes-Benz |
| 5 | Autódromo Internacional Ayrton Senna, Londrina | July 10 | Roberval Andrade | Scania |
| 6 | Autódromo Internacional Orlando Moura | August 7 | Race cancelled due to a massive start crash | |
| 7 | Autódromo Internacional de Curitiba | September 11 | Luiz Carlos Zapellini | Volkswagen |
| 8 | Autódromo Internacional de Tarumã | November 6 | Roberval Andrade | Scania |
| 9 | Autódromo Internacional Nelson Piquet, Brasília | December 11 | Roberval Andrade | Scania |
