= 2014 Fórmula Truck season =

2014 Fórmula Truck

Seasons
- ← 2013 2015 →

The 2014 Fórmula Truck season was the 19th Fórmula Truck season. It began on March 18 at Caruaru and ended on December 7 at Goiânia. All ten rounds counted towards the Brazilian title, with four rounds counting towards the South American title.

Leandro Totti won his second Fórmula Truck title in three years, after starting the season with five successive victories for the RM Competições team, before adding a sixth victory at the series' only race outside of Brazil, at the Autódromo Oscar Cabalén in Argentina. He finished 44 points clear of his teammate Felipe Giaffone, who was a race winner at Londrina. Third place in the championship went to Wellington Cirino, who piloted his ABF Mercedes to a victory in the season finale, at Goiânia. The season's only other winners were Scuderia Iveco driver Beto Monteiro, who won at Santa Cruz do Sul, while Roberval Andrade won at Guaporé for Corinthians Motorsport. With seven victories from the ten races, MAN Latin America won the manufacturers' championship by over 100 points ahead of the next closest marque, Mercedes-Benz.

Totti and MAN Latin America also won the South American sub-classifications, which was held over four of the first seven races in the 2014 season. Totti won all four races, finishing 61 points clear of Giaffone and Cirino's ABF Mercedes teammate Geraldo Piquet. MAN Latin America also won their respective title by 61 points, ahead of Mercedes-Benz.

== Teams and drivers ==
All drivers were Brazilian-registered.

Manufacturer	Team	No.	Driver	Rounds
Iveco	Scuderia Iveco	1	Beto Monteiro	1–4, 6–7
Iveco	Scuderia Iveco	2	Valmir Benavides	1–7
Iveco	Dakar Motorsport	25	Jaidson Zini	1–7
Iveco	Lucar Motorsports	99	Luiz Lopes	1–7
Mercedes-Benz	ABF Mercedes-Benz	3	Geraldo Piquet	1–7
Mercedes-Benz	ABF Mercedes-Benz	6	Wellington Cirino	1–7
Mercedes-Benz	ABF Desenvolvimento Team	53	Ronaldo Kastropil	1–7
Mercedes-Benz	ABF Racing Team	55	Paulo Salustiano	1–7
Mercedes-Benz	ABF Racing Team	90	Marcelo Cesquim	1–7
MAN	RM Competições	4	Felipe Giaffone	1–7
Volkswagen	RM Competições	7	Débora Rodrigues	1–7
Volkswagen	RM Competições	8	Adalberto Jardim	1, 3–7
Volkswagen	RM Competições	73	Leandro Totti	1–7
Volkswagen	RM Competições	77	André Marques	1–7
Volkswagen	RM Competições	81	Renato Martins	2
Scania	Muffatão Racing	10	Jansen Bueno	1–7
Scania	Muffatão Racing	20	Pedro Muffato	1–5, 7
Scania	Ticket Car Corinthians Motorsport	15	Roberval Andrade	1–7
Scania	Ticket Car Corinthians Motorsport	85	Danilo Dirani	1–7
Scania	Falsi & Falsi Competições	28	Fabiano Brito	5–7
Ford	Original Reis Peças	12	José Maria Reis	3–6
Ford	Original Reis Peças	51	Leandro Reis	1–6
Ford	DF Motorsport	35	David Muffato	1–7
Ford	DF Motorsport	71	Raijan Mascarello	1–7
Ford	DF Motorsport	72	Djalma Fogaça	1–6
Volvo	Copacol Clay Truck	14	João Marcos Maistro	1–4, 6–7
Volvo	Copacol Clay Truck	80	Diogo Pachenki	1–7
Volvo	ABF Volvo	17	Gustavo Magnabosco	5–7
Volvo	ABF Volvo	28	Fabiano Brito	1–3
Volvo	ABF Volvo	33	Michelle de Jesus	2–7

== Calendar and results ==
All races were held in Brazil, excepting the round at Autódromo Oscar Cabalén, that was held in Argentina.

Round	Circuit	Date	Pole position	Fastest lap	Winning driver	Winning team
1	Autódromo Internacional Ayrton Senna, Caruaru	March 16	Leandro Totti	Leandro Totti	Leandro Totti	RM Competições
2	Autódromo Internacional de Curitiba	April 13	Felipe Giaffone	Paulo Salustiano	Leandro Totti	RM Competições
3	Autódromo José Carlos Pace	May 18	Leandro Totti	Felipe Giaffone	Leandro Totti	RM Competições
4	Autódromo Internacional Nelson Piquet, Brasília	June 8	Roberval Andrade	Leandro Reis	Leandro Totti	RM Competições
5	Autódromo Internacional de Cascavel	July 20	Leandro Totti	Leandro Totti	Leandro Totti	RM Competições
6	Autódromo Internacional de Santa Cruz do Sul	August 17	Beto Monteiro	Beto Monteiro	Beto Monteiro	Scuderia Iveco
7	Autódromo Oscar Cabalén	September 14	Wellington Cirino	Leandro Totti	Leandro Totti	RM Competições
8	Autódromo Internacional de Guaporé	October 12	Roberval Andrade	Leandro Totti	Roberval Andrade	Corinthians Motorsport
9	Autódromo Internacional Ayrton Senna, Londrina	November 2	Felipe Giaffone	Felipe Giaffone	Felipe Giaffone	RM Competições
10	Autódromo Internacional Ayrton Senna, Goiânia	December 7	Felipe Giaffone	Felipe Giaffone	Wellington Cirino	ABF Mercedes-Benz

Key:

Race formed part of the Brazilian Championship
Race formed part of the Brazilian and the South American Championships
