= Autódromo Internacional Ayrton Senna =

Autódromo Internacional Ayrton Senna may refer to one of the following race tracks in Brazil:

- Autódromo Internacional Ayrton Senna (Caruaru) in Caruaru
- Autódromo Internacional Ayrton Senna (Goiânia) in Goiânia
- Autódromo Internacional Ayrton Senna (Londrina) in Londrina
