= Danilo Dirani =

Brazilian racing driver

- Nationality: Brazilian
- Born: January 10, 1983 (age 43) São Paulo

Fórmula Truck career
- Debut season: 2009
- Current team: DF Motorsport
- Categorisation: FIA Silver
- Car number: 70
- Former teams: ABF Volvo
- Starts: 19
- Wins: 1
- Poles: 3
- Fastest laps: 3
- Best finish: 8th in 2011

Previous series
- 2006 2004-05 2002-03: Champ Car Atlantic; British Formula Three; Formula Three Sudamericana

Championship titles
- 2003: Formula Three Sudamericana

Danilo Dirani is a racing driver from Brazil. He was born on January 10, 1983, in São Paulo. In his karting career (between the years of 1992 and 2002), Danilo won 29 different championships in South America.

In 2002, Dirani moved to Formula 3 and Formula Three Sudamericana, and finished runner-up to Nelson Piquet Jr. Dirani won just two races, compared to Piquet's thirteen. But in 2003, he won 14 out of the 18 races to win the championship.

In 2004, Dirani crossed the Atlantic Ocean and came to British soil for the British version of Formula 3, and finished fifth in the championship, with two wins, both at Croft and 146 points. He finished behind Piquet Jr, Adam Carroll, James Rossiter and Clivio Piccione.

Dirani moved to the P1 Motorsport team for the 2005 British F3 International Series, and again had two wins in the opening two races at Donington Park, and he also got his first pole position in British F3 at the same race meeting. He scored 14 more points than 2004, but finished one place lower in the standings in sixth, behind Álvaro Parente, Charlie Kimball, Mike Conway, Marko Asmer and Dan Clarke.

Dirani was added to the Honda Racing F1 development roster for the 2005 season, together with other drivers from the British F3, as a form of marketing for the championship.

In 2006, Dirani crossed the Atlantic Ocean back to America. He competed in the Champ Car Atlantic Series, and finished in seventh position in the championship.

Dirani is currently racing for DF Motorsports in Brazilian Fórmula Truck. He has also competed in karting races in Brazil and USA since 2007.

== Racing record ==
=== Career summary ===
Season	Series	Team	Races	Wins	Poles	F.Laps	Podiums	Points	Position
2002	Formula 3 Sudamericana	Césario Fórmula	18	2	1	1	9	189	2nd
2003	Formula 3 Sudamericana	Césario Fórmula	18	14	13	17	16	317	1st
2004	British Formula Three Championship	Carlin Motorsport	24	2	3	3	5	146	5th
2004	FIA European Formula 3 Cup	Carlin Motorsport	1	0	0	0	1	0	3rd
2004	Masters of Formula 3	Carlin Motorsport	1	0	0	0	0	0	17th
2004	Bahrain Super Prix	Carlin Motorsport	1	0	0	0	0	0	NC
2005	British Formula Three Championship	P1 Motorsport	22	2	1	0	5	150	6th
2005	Formula Renault 3.5 Series	Victory Engineering	2	0	0	0	0	0	NC
2006	Atlantic Championship	Condor Motorsports	12	0	0	0	1	178	7th
2007	Stock Car Brasil	WB Motorsport	1	0	0	0	0	0	NC
2009	Fórmula Truck	ABF Volvo	10	0	0	0	1	46	12th
2010	Fórmula Truck	DF Motorsport	10	0	2	1	1	44	14th
2011	Fórmula Truck	DF Motorsport	7	1	1	2	1	56	8th
2011	Fórmula Truck South America	DF Motorsport	3	0	0	1	2	55	2nd
2012	Fórmula Truck	DF Motorsport	10	0	0	0	0	13	21st
2012	Fórmula Truck South America	DF Motorsport	3	0	0	0	0	4	22nd
2013	Fórmula Truck	DF Motorsport	2	0	0	0	0	0	NC
2013	Fórmula Truck South America	DF Motorsport	1	0	0	0	0	0	NC
2014	Fórmula Truck	Ticket Car Corinthians Motorsport	10	0	0	0	0	55	10th
2014	Fórmula Truck South America	Ticket Car Corinthians Motorsport	4	0	0	0	0	24	9th
2015	Campeonato Brasileiro de Turismo	Bravar Motorsport	11	2	1	0	3	113	8th
2016	Stock Car Brasil	RZ Motorsport	7	0	0	0	0	30	31st
2017	Copa Truck	GG Motorsport	10	1	1	2	2	63	13th
2018	Copa Truck	PP Competições	9	2	1	3	4	99	13th
2020	Copa Truck	PP Competições	6	0	0	1	3	139	3rd
2021	Copa Truck	PP Competições	13	3	0	1	4	147	7th
2021	Stock Car Pro Series	Scuderia CJ	1	0	0	0	0	0	33rd
2022	Copa Truck	PP Competições	10	0	0	0	0	14	12th
2022	Stock Car Pro Series	RCM Motorsport	1	0	0	0	0	0	NC
2022	Império Endurance Brasil - GT4	Stuttgart Motorsport	5	0	0	2	5	0	NC
2026	Porsche Carrera Cup Brasil								

Sporting positions
Preceded by Nelson Piquet Jr.	Formula Three Sudamericana Champion; 2003	Succeeded by Alexandre Negrão
