= 2006 Fórmula Truck season =

2006 Fórmula Truck

Seasons
- ← 2005 2007 →

The 2006 Fórmula Truck season was the 11th Fórmula Truck season. It began on March 19 at Caruaru and ended on December 10 at Brasília.

== Calendar and results ==
All races were held in Brazil.

Round	Circuit	Date	Winning driver	Winning team
1	Autódromo Internacional Ayrton Senna, Caruaru	March 19	Leandro Totti	Londrina Truck Racing
2	Autódromo Internacional Virgílio Távora	April 16	Pedro Muffato	MP Motorsport
3	Autódromo José Carlos Pace	May 21	Roberval Andrade	Roberval Motorsport
4	Autódromo Internacional de Guaporé	June 11	Renato Martins	RM Competições
5	Autódromo Internacional Orlando Moura	July 16	Vinicius Ramires	RRT2
6	Autódromo Internacional de Cascavel	September 17	Renato Martins	RM Competições
7	Autódromo Internacional de Curitiba	October 8	Vinicius Ramires	RRT2
8	Autódromo Internacional de Tarumã	November 12	Djalma Fogaça	DF Motorsport
9	Autódromo Internacional Nelson Piquet, Brasília	December 10	Geraldo Piquet	ABF Competições
