= 2003 Fórmula Truck season =

2003 Fórmula Truck

Seasons
- ← 2002 2004 →

The 2003 Fórmula Truck season was the 8th Fórmula Truck season. It began on March 16 at Goiânia and ended on December 7 at Curitiba.

== Calendar and results ==
All races were held in Brazil.

Round	Circuit	Date	Winning driver	Winning manufacturer
1	Autódromo Internacional Ayrton Senna, Goiânia	March 16	Djalma Fogaça	Ford
2	Autódromo Internacional de Guaporé	April 13	Djalma Fogaça	Ford
3	Autódromo Internacional de Cascavel	May 18	Djalma Fogaça	Ford
4	Autódromo Internacional Nelson Piquet, Brasília	June 22	Wellington Cirino	Mercedes-Benz
5	Autódromo Internacional Ayrton Senna, Londrina	July 27	Wellington Cirino	Mercedes-Benz
6	Autódromo Internacional Orlando Moura	August 24	Wellington Cirino	Mercedes-Benz
7	Autódromo José Carlos Pace	October 5	Wellington Cirino	Mercedes-Benz
8	Autódromo Internacional de Tarumã	November 9	Wellington Cirino	Mercedes-Benz
9	Autódromo Internacional de Curitiba	December 7	Viginaldo Fizio	Mercedes-Benz
