= 2017 Fórmula Truck season =

The 2017 Fórmula Truck season was the 22nd Fórmula Truck season. In 2017, several teams left the organization to create a new championship called Copa Truck. After 2 rounds of the 2017 season, the lack of audience, partners and drives forced the postponement of the 3rd race twice. After that, the organization website announced that the 2017 season was cancelled and that they would try to return in 2018.

== Teams and drivers ==
All drivers were Brazilian-registered, excepting Carolina Cánepa, Fabricio Larratea and Gabriel Cato, who raced under Uruguayan racing license, and Alan Chanoski, who raced under Paraguayan racing license.

Manufacturer	Team	No.	Driver	Rounds
Volvo	Woman´s Racing Team	27	Cristina Rosito	1-3
Volvo	Woman´s Racing Team	41	Carolina Cánepa	1-3
Ford	HB Motorsport	11	Ricardo Gargiulo	1-2
Ford	HB Motorsport	186	Edson Ferreira	2
Mercedes-Benz	ABF Mercedes-Benz	2	Valmir Benavides	3
Mercedes-Benz	ABF Mercedes-Benz	6	Wellington Cirino	1-2
Mercedes-Benz	ABF Mercedes-Benz	55	Paulo Salustiano	1-3
Mercedes-Benz	ABF Mercedes-Benz	111	Fabricio Larratea	2
Mercedes-Benz	Bravus Brasil Racing Team	13	Witold Ramasauskas	1-3
Mercedes-Benz	ABF Racing Team	44	Joel Mendes Júnior	1-2
Mercedes-Benz	ABF Azulim Truck Racing	333	Alex Fabiano	3
Scania		67	Marlon Watanabe	
Scania	Scania Team	20	Gabriel Cato	2
Iveco	MGP3 Motorsport	25	Rodrigo Gomes	1
Iveco	MGP3 Motorsport	1	Cristiano da Matta	3
Iveco	AAF Motorsport	37	Alan Chanoski	1-3
Iveco	AAF Motorsport	99	João Cury	3
