= 2018 Formula Academy Sudamericana season =

Motor racing championship held in 2018

2018 Fórmula Academy Sudamericana

Seasons
- ← 2017 2019 →

The 2018 Fórmula Academy Sudamericana Championship season is the third season of this series, and the first under the Fórmula Academy Sudamericana name. It began on the 22 July at the Autódromo Internacional Ayrton Senna, Londrina in Brazil and finished on 9 December at the Autódromo Víctor Borrat Fabini in Uruguay after 6 rounds.

== Drivers ==
No.	Driver	Rounds
2	(Brazil) Pedro Burger	1, 4
7	(Uruguay) Facundo Ferra	6
8	(Brazil) Geraldo Rodrigues	5
8	(Brazil) Nathan Brito	3
77	(Brazil) Nathan Brito	5
9	(Brazil) Bruno Bertoncello	1
10	(Brazil) Cassio Cortes	2
12	(Brazil) Leandro Guedes	All
18	(Brazil) Pedro Lopes	2
23	(Brazil) Francisco Porto	2
26	(Brazil) Pedro Saderi	1
28	(Brazil) Bruno Testa	2–6
33	(Brazil) Mateo Mollo	1
33	(Uruguay) Facundo Garese	6
34	(Brazil) Juan Vieira	All
84	(Uruguay) Andres De Araújo	6
85	(Brazil) Enzo Bortoleto	4
97	(Brazil) Bruna Tomaselli	3–5

== Race calendar and results ==
The grid for race 2 is determined by the finishing order of race 1, but with the top 6 reversed.

Round		Circuit	Date	Pole position	Fastest lap	Winning driver	Source
1	R1	(Brazil) Autódromo Internacional Ayrton Senna, Londrina	22 July	(Brazil) Pedro Saderi	(Brazil) Leandro Guedes	(Brazil) Pedro Saderi	
1	R2	(Brazil) Autódromo Internacional Ayrton Senna, Londrina	22 July		(Brazil) Leandro Guedes	(Brazil) Pedro Saderi	
2	R1	(Brazil) Interlagos Circuit, São Paulo	2 September	(Brazil) Pedro Lopes	(Brazil) Juan Vieira	(Brazil) Pedro Lopes	
2	R2	(Brazil) Interlagos Circuit, São Paulo	2 September		(Brazil) Leandro Guedes	(Brazil) Leandro Guedes	
3	R1	(Brazil) Autódromo Internacional Ayrton Senna, Londrina	30 September	(Brazil) Nathan Brito	(Brazil) Nathan Brito	(Brazil) Nathan Brito	
3	R2	(Brazil) Autódromo Internacional Ayrton Senna, Londrina	30 September		(Brazil) Nathan Brito	(Brazil) Nathan Brito	
4	R1	(Brazil) Autódromo Velo Città, Mogi Guaçu	14 October	(Brazil) Enzo Bortoleto	(Brazil) Enzo Bortoleto	(Brazil) Enzo Bortoleto	
4	R2	(Brazil) Autódromo Velo Città, Mogi Guaçu	14 October		(Brazil) Enzo Bortoleto	(Brazil) Enzo Bortoleto	
5	R1	(Brazil) Autódromo Internacional Ayrton Senna, Londrina	23–24 November	(Brazil) Juan Vieira	(Brazil) Nathan Brito	(Brazil) Nathan Brito	
5	R2	(Brazil) Autódromo Internacional Ayrton Senna, Londrina	23–24 November		(Brazil) Nathan Brito	(Brazil) Nathan Brito	
6	R1	(Uruguay) Autódromo Víctor Borrat Fabini, El Pinar	9 December	(Uruguay) Facundo Ferra	(Uruguay) Facundo Garese	(Uruguay) Facundo Garese	
6	R2	(Uruguay) Autódromo Víctor Borrat Fabini, El Pinar	9 December		(Uruguay) Facundo Ferra	(Brazil) Juan Vieira	

== Championship standings ==
Points system

Points were awarded as follows:

	1	2	3	4	5	6	7	8	9	10	R1 PP	FL
Rounds 1–5	25	18	15	12	10	8	6	4	2	1	1	1
Round 6	50	36	30	24	20	16	12	8	4	2	1	1

=== Fórmula Academy Sudamericana Championship ===
Juan Vieira was crowned the 2018 champion at the final round.

Pos	Driver	LON1 (Brazil)		INT (Brazil)		LON2 (Brazil)		MOG (Brazil)		LON3 (Brazil)		ELP (Uruguay)		Pts
1	(Brazil) Juan Vieira	2	2	2	6	DNS	3	3	3	**2**	5	Ret	1	187
2	(Brazil) Leandro Guedes	3	5	6	1	4	4	4	5	3	3	Ret	2	172
3	(Brazil) Bruno Testa			5	2	3	5	2	4	Ret	2	3	Ret	133
4	(Brazil) Nathan Brito					**1**	1			1	1			104
5	(Brazil) Bruna Tomaselli					2	2	Ret	2	4	4			86
6	(Uruguay) Andres De Araújo											2	3	66
7	(Brazil) Enzo Bortoleto							**1**	1					53
8	(Uruguay) Facundo Garese											1	DNS	51
9	(Brazil) Pedro Saderi	**1**	1											51
10	(Brazil) Pedro Burger	5	4					5	6					40
11	(Brazil) Pedro Lopes			**1**	4									38
12	(Brazil) Bruno Bertoncello	4	3											27
13	(Brazil) Cassio Cortes			4	3									27
14	(Uruguay) Facundo Ferra											**Ret**	4	26
15	(Brazil) Francisco Porto			3	5									25
-	(Brazil) Mateo Mollo	Ret	Ret											0
-	(Brazil) Geraldo Rodrigues									Ret	Ret			0
Pos	Driver	LON1		INT		LON2		MOG		LON3		ELP		Pts

Colour	Result
Gold	Winner
Silver	Second place
Bronze	Third place
Green	Points classification
Blue	Non-points classification
Blue	Non-classified finish (NC)
Purple	Retired, not classified (Ret)
Red	Did not qualify (DNQ)
Red	Did not pre-qualify (DNPQ)
Black	Disqualified (DSQ)
White	Did not start (DNS)
White	Withdrew (WD)
White	Race cancelled (C)
Blank	Did not practice (DNP)
Blank	Did not arrive (DNA)
Blank	Excluded (EX)

**Bold** – Pole
Italics – Fastest Lap
