= Autódromo Oscar Cabalén =

- Full Circuit (1998–present)
- Location: Villa Parque Santa Ana, Córdoba, Argentina
- Coordinates: 31°34′33″S 64°21′41″W
- Opened: 17 March 1968; 58 years ago Re-opened: 15 March 1998; 28 years ago
- Closed: 1993
- Major events: Current: TCR South America (2021, 2023, 2026); Turismo Carretera (1968, 1970, 1977, 1988, 2014, 2025–present); TC2000 (1980–1982, 1984–1985, 1987, 1989–1992, 1998–2005, 2007–2024, 2026); Turismo Nacional (1967–1968, 1973, 1975, 1977–1980, 1982, 1985–1987, 1992–1993, 2002, 2005–2008, 2011, 2013, 2015, 2022–present); Top Race V6 (1999–2000, 2003, 2011, 2013, 2015, 2018–2019, 2026); Former: FIM MXGP (2025); TC Pick Up (2024); F4 Argentina (2021); F3 Sudamericana (1998, 2004–2005, 2007); SASTC (1999); Fórmula Truck (2012–2014)

No. 3 Circuit (1998–present)
- Length: 4.045 km (2.513 mi)
- Turns: 14
- Race lap record: 1:22.639 ( (Brazil) Alberto Valerio, Dallara F301, 2005, F3)

No.5 Circuit (2012–present)
- Length: 3.800 km (2.361 mi)
- Turns: 8
- Race lap record: 1:14.109 ( (Argentina) Julián Santero, Ford Mustang Mach 1, 2025, TC)

No. 2 Circuit (1975–1993, 1998–present)
- Length: 2.601 km (1.616 mi)
- Turns: 11
- Race lap record: 1:02.130 ( (Brazil) Alexandre Foizer, Dallara F301, 2004, F3)

No. 4 Circuit (1998–present)
- Length: 2.300 km (1.429 mi)
- Turns: 8
- Race lap record: 0:58.251 ( (Argentina) Luciano Farroni, Ford Focus III, 2014, TC2000 Series)

No. 1 Circuit (1968–1993)
- Length: 3.202 km (1.990 mi)
- Turns: 5
- Race lap record: 0:54.980 ( (Australia) Tim Schenken, Brabham BT36, 1971, F2)

Autódromo Oscar Cabalén is a 4.045 km (2.513 mi) motorsports circuit located in Villa Parque Santa Ana near to Alta Gracia, Córdoba, Argentina. It has hosted events in the TC2000, Turismo Nacional and Formula Nacional Argentina series. The circuit is named in honour of racing driver, Oscar Cabalén (1928–1967).

== Events ==
Current

- March: Turismo Nacional
- May: Turismo Carretera, Turismo Carretera Pista, Fórmula 2 Argentina
- August: TCR South America Touring Car Championship
- December: TC2000 Championship, Top Race V6, Fórmula Nacional Argentina

Former

- F4 Argentina Championship (2021)
- Formula 3 Sudamericana (1998, 2004–2005, 2007)
- Formula 4 Sudamericana (2015)
- Fórmula Truck (2012–2014)
- Motocross World Championship (2025)
- Porsche GT3 Cup Trophy Argentina (2018)
- South American Super Touring Car Championship (1999)
- TC Pick Up (2024)
- TC Pista Pick Up (2024)

== Lap records ==
As of August 2026, the fastest official race lap records at the Autódromo Oscar Cabalén are listed as:

Category	Time	Driver	Vehicle	Event
No.3 Circuit (1998–present): 4.045 km (2.513 mi)
Formula Three	1:22.639	Alberto Valerio	Dallara F301	2005 Córdoba F3 Sudamericana round
Formula Renault 2.0	1:31.600	Rodrigo Rogani	Tito F4-A	2011 Córdoba Formula Renault 2.0 Argentina round
TC2000	1:31.868	Facundo Ardusso	Honda Civic	2022 1st Córdoba TC2000 round
TCR Touring Car	1:32.981	Camilo Trappa	Hyundai Elantra N TCR	2026 Córdoba TCR South America round
Formula 4	1:34.601	Valentino Mini	Mygale M14-F4	2021 Córdoba F4 Argentina round
Super Touring	1:37.335	Emiliano Spataro	Peugeot 406	1999 Córdoba SASTC round
No.5 Circuit (2012–present): 3.800 km (2.361 mi)
Turismo Carretera	1:14.109	Julián Santero	Ford Mustang Mach 1	2025 Córdoba Turismo Carretera round
Porsche Carrera Cup	1:15.371	Julián Santero	Porsche 911 (991 I) GT3 Cup	2018 1st Córdoba Porsche GT3 Cup Trophy Argentina round
Súper TC2000	1:16.022	José Manuel Urcera	Chevrolet Cruze	2020 2nd Córdoba Súper TC2000 round
Formula Renault 2.0	1:17.218	Ignacio Monti	Tito F4-A	2026 Posadas Fórmula 2 Argentina round
TC Pick Up	1:18.749	Mariano Werner	Toyota Hilux	2024 Córdoba TC Pick Up round
Truck racing	1:31.961	Leandro Totti	Volkswagen Truck	2014 Córdoba Fórmula Truck round
No.2 Circuit (1975–1993, 1998–present): 2.601 km (1.616 mi)
Formula Three	1:02.130	Alexandre Foizer	Dallara F301	2004 Córdoba F3 Sudamericana round
TC2000	1:08.751	Juan María Traverso	Honda Civic VI	1998 1st Córdoba TC2000 round
No.4 Circuit: 2.300 km (1998–present)
TC2000 Series	0:58.251	Luciano Farroni	Ford Focus III	2014 2nd Córdoba TC2000 Series round
No.1 Circuit (1968–1993): 3.202 km (1.990 mi)
Formula Two	0:54.980	Tim Schenken	Brabham BT36	1971 Córdoba F2 round
