= South American Super Touring Car Championship =

- Category: Touring cars
- Country: South America
- Inaugural season: 1997
- Folded: 2001

The South American Super Touring Car Championship (known locally as the Copa de las Naciones Super Turismo then as the Copa de Superturismo Sudamericano) was an international touring car racing series in South America which used FIA Super Touring regulations.

== Champions ==
Year	Driver1	Car
1997	(Argentina) Oscar Larrauri	BMW 320i
1998	(Argentina) Oscar Larrauri	BMW 320i
1999*	(Argentina) Emiliano Spataro (Brazil) Cacá Bueno	Peugeot 406
2000	(Argentina) Oscar Larrauri	Alfa Romeo 156

- Bueno and Spataro had identical numbers of wins, places down to seventh and pole positions, so were declared joint champions.

== Notable drivers ==
- (Argentina) Oscar Larrauri
- (Argentina) Miguel Ángel Guerra
- (Brazil) Ingo Hoffmann
- (Argentina) Juan Manuel Fangio II
- (Uruguay) Gonzalo Rodríguez
- (Argentina) Osvaldo Lopez

== See also ==
- TCR South America Touring Car Championship
