= Fórmula Truck =

Truck racing championship in Brasil

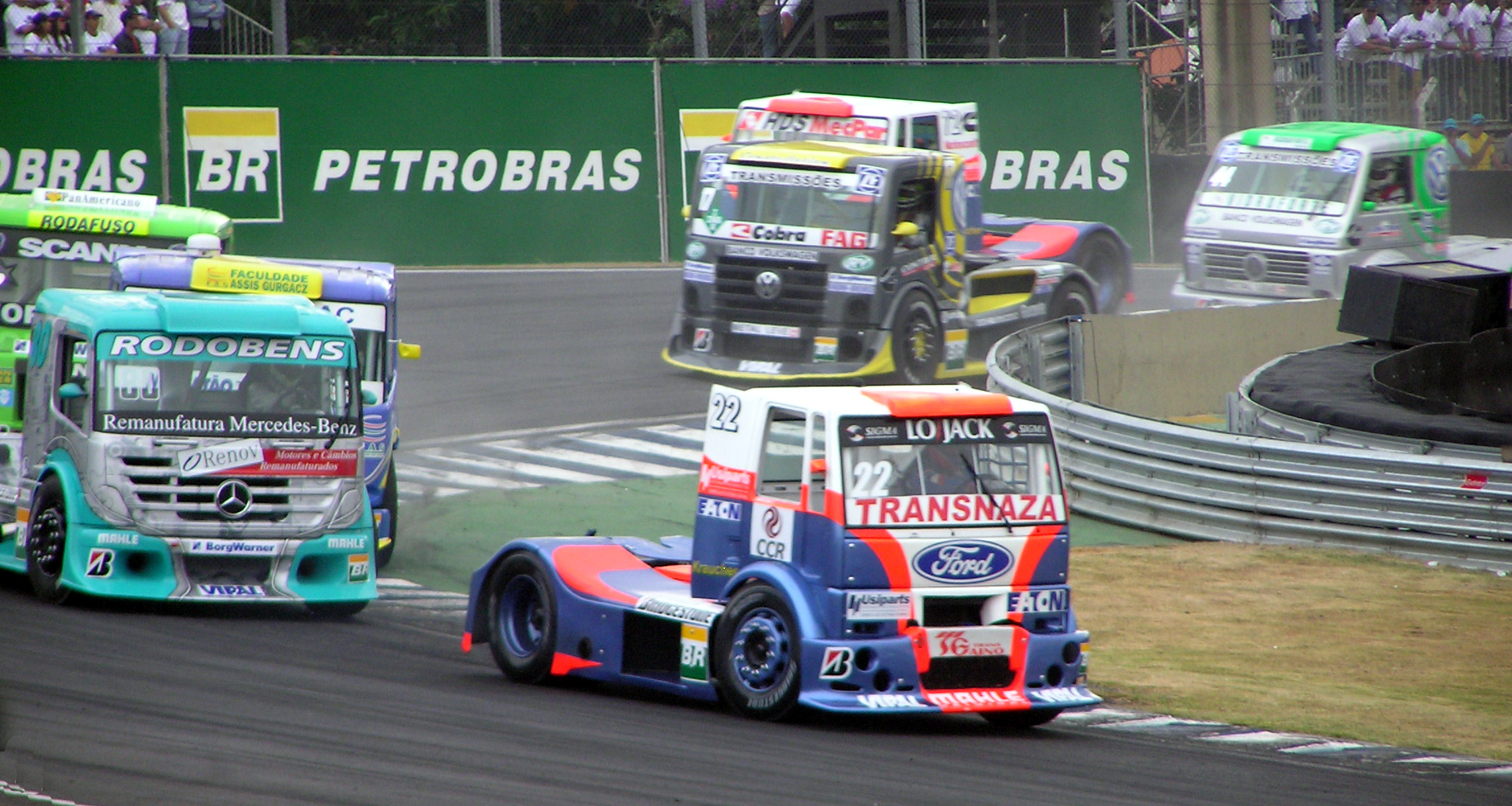
- Category: Truck racing
- Country: Brazil & South America
- Inaugural season: 1996; 2021 (current format)
- Folded: 2017
- Constructors: (United States) Ford (Italy) Iveco (Germany) MAN (Germany) Mercedes-Benz (Sweden) Scania (Sweden) Volvo (Germany) Volkswagen
- Tyre suppliers: (India) JK Tyre
- Last Drivers' champion: (São Paulo (state)) Felipe Giaffone (2016)
- Last Makes' champion: (Germany) Mercedes-Benz (2016)
- Last Teams' champion: (Brazil) RM Competições (2016)
- Official website: formulatruck.com

Fórmula Truck is a Brazilian Truck racing series promoted by GT Truck. It originally ran from 1996 until 2017, when it folded due to various disagreements, and was reorganized into the Copa Truck. The series returned in 2021 as a separate championship being promoted by GT Truck.

== History ==
=== Early history ===
The idea for the racing series came from discussions between Aurélio Batista Félix, a truck driver from Santos, and Portuguese journalist Francisco Santos.

The first race took place on 6 September 1987 at the Autodromo Internacional de Cascavel circuit in Paraná. It involved 35 competitors and was named I Copa Brasil de Caminhões ("First Brazilian Trucks' Cup"). It served as a safety test for what was a brand new racing format. However, there was a fatal accident involving one of the participants: Jeferson Ribeiro da Fonseca, a driver who was also the president of Autodromo Internacional de Cascavel. Jeferson Ribeiro's death had a profound impact and led to Francisco Santos leaving Fórmula Truck three years later.

In 1994, a new event for truck drivers and businessmen was created, with safety as a top priority, at the Interlagos circuit in São Paulo. The contest began in 1995, and the four trial races were held in the cities of Cascavel and Londrina (PR), Tarumã (RS), and Goiânia (GO). In Goiânia, over 120,000 people attended the event.

The first championship with defined rules took place in 1996 and was approved by the Confederação Brasileira de Automobilismo (Brazilian Automobile Confederation). The first official competition took place in Guaporé (RS) and had 13 trucks on the grid.

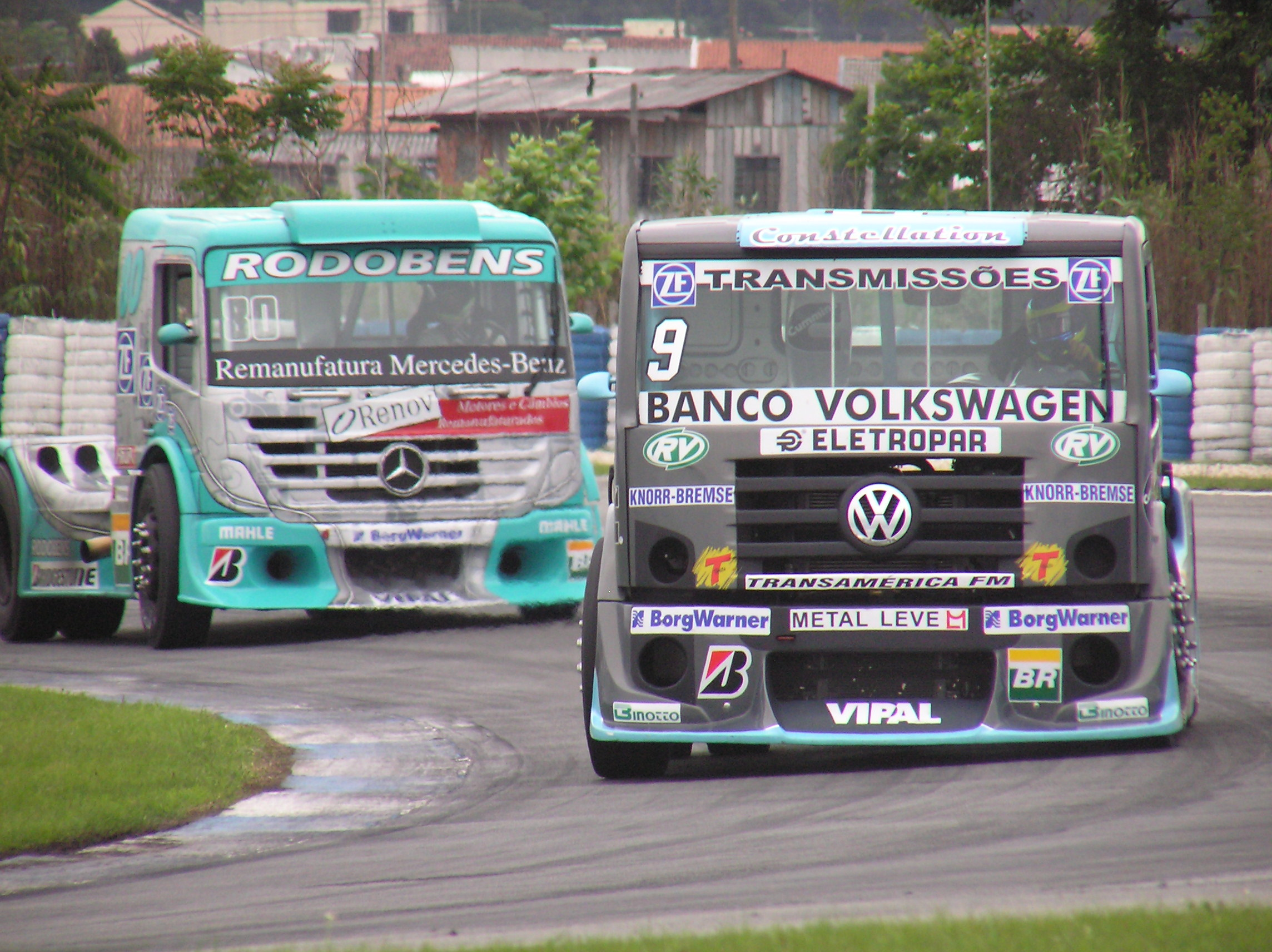
Renato Martins (#9), first champion of the category in 1996. 2006 in Curitiba.

On 5 March 2008, the creator of Formula Truck, Aurélio Batista Félix, died of a stomach hemorrhage. He had heart problems and suffered a heart attack during the first stage of the 2008 season, which was being held in Guaporé.

In 2010, the organisation announced a South American championship, and Roberval Andrade was crowned champion. In 2011, three races were announced for the South American Championship.

Before the start of the 2017 season, several teams left Formula Truck due to disagreements with the series management. Those teams created the Copa Truck series, featuring drivers such as Felipe Giaffone and Beto Monteiro.

=== Return in 2021 ===
The Formula Truck returned in 2021, now promoted by Gilberto Hidalgo of GT Truck. The new series has trucks with less power and divided into two categories (Electronic and TDI).

== Format ==
A weekend generally consists of three days, on Friday, each driver is entitled to three 45-minute practice sessions. For qualifying, there is a single 30-minute session to decide two qualifying groups, A and B. Group A defines the drivers on the odd numbered grid spots, with Group B taking the even spots.

=== Qualifying ===
The qualifying session that decides the starting grid is held the Saturday before the race. Each driver has a warm-up lap, three timed laps, and a slowdown lap. If they give up, the driver is entitled to a single timed lap at the end of the session.

In 2015, the format was changed to have a single 30-minute session to decide the qualifying groups, which are A for odd numbered grid spots, and B for even spots.

=== Race format ===
In Formula Truck, the number of laps in each race is determined by the length and conditions of the racetrack and usually ranges from 30 to 35 laps. During the Ceará race, which occurred in 2006, the number of laps was 60, due to the length of the track. Any laps completed with a pace truck are considered invalid. In restarts, pairing of the trucks is stopped and overtaking is allowed only after the checkered flag, or when the green light is lit.

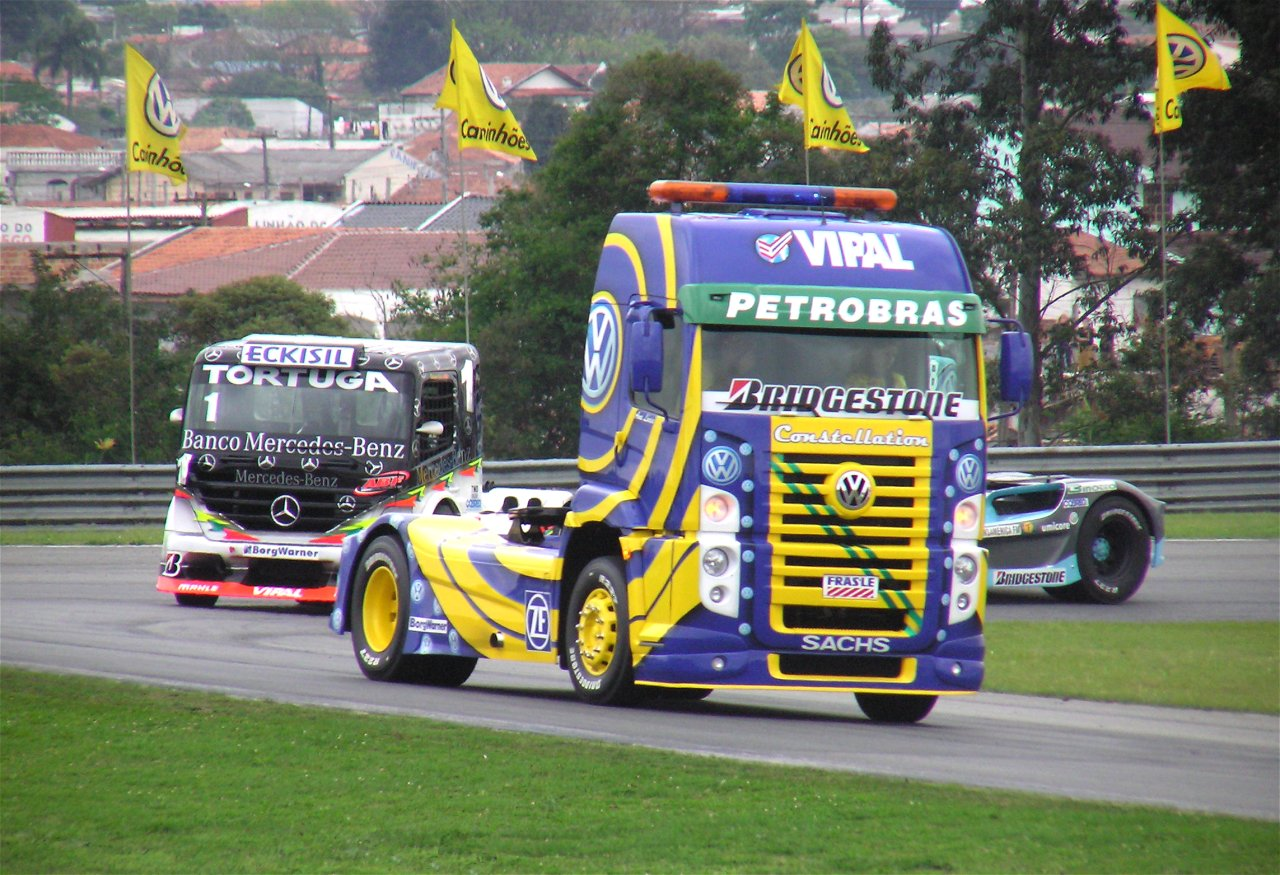
Pace Truck of 2006 championship.

In 2006, when the 12th valid lap is completed, the drivers will receive a chequered flag in green and yellow, which scores the first six places. At this point, the Pace Truck enters the track and neutralises the race for cleaning and removing vehicles on the track, remaining for three to five laps. After restart, trucks complete the preset number of laps and make the podium in accordance with their respective classification in the race or with fewer time penalties if applicable.

The trucks have enough power to exceed 200 km/h (120 mph), in every circuit, there is a designated area with a speed limit of 160 km/h (99 mph), to ensure sufficient safety. This area is generally the fastest point on the track, like the start-finish straight.

== Scoring system ==
Position	1st	2nd	3rd	4th	5th	6th	7th	8th	9th	10th	11th	12th	13th	14th	PP	FL	Lap 12	1st	2nd	3rd	4th	5th
Points	25	20	17	14	12	10	8	7	6	5	4	3	2	1	1	1	Points	5	4	3	2	1

== Champions ==
=== Brazilian ===
Year	Driver	Truck	Team	Manufacturer
1996	(São Paulo (state)) Renato Martins	Scania	Marfran	Not held
1997	(Paraná (state)) Oswaldo Drugovich Jr.	Scania	Drugovich Auto Peças	Not held
1998	(Paraná (state)) Oswaldo Drugovich Jr.	Scania	Drugovich Auto Peças	Not held
1999	(Rio Grande do Sul) Jorge Fleck	Volvo	ABF Volvo	Not held
2000	(Rio Grande do Sul) Jorge Fleck	Volvo	Thermoid-Melitta-Volvo	Not held
2001	(Paraná (state)) Wellington Cirino	Mercedes-Benz	ABF Mercedes-Benz	Not held
2002	(São Paulo (state)) Roberval Andrade	Scania	Muffatão	Not held
2003	(Paraná (state)) Wellington Cirino	Mercedes-Benz	ABF Mercedes-Benz	Not held
2004	(Pernambuco) Beto Monteiro	Ford	DF Motorsport	Ford
2005	(Paraná (state)) Wellington Cirino	Mercedes-Benz	ABF Mercedes-Benz	Scania
2006	(São Paulo (state)) Renato Martins	Volkswagen	RM Competições	Mercedes-Benz
2007	(São Paulo (state)) Felipe Giaffone	Volkswagen	RM Competições	Volkswagen
2008	(Paraná (state)) Wellington Cirino	Mercedes-Benz	ABF Mercedes-Benz	Mercedes-Benz
2009	(São Paulo (state)) Felipe Giaffone	Volkswagen	RM Competições	Volkswagen
2010	(São Paulo (state)) Roberval Andrade	Scania	RVR Corinthians Motorsport	Volkswagen
2011	(São Paulo (state)) Felipe Giaffone	Volkswagen	RM Competições	Volkswagen
2012	(Paraná (state)) Leandro Totti	Mercedes-Benz	ABF Racing Team	Mercedes-Benz
2013	(Pernambuco) Beto Monteiro	Iveco	Scuderia Iveco	Mercedes-Benz
2014	(Paraná (state)) Leandro Totti	Volkswagen	RM Competições	MAN
2015	(Paraná (state)) Leandro Totti	Volkswagen	RM Competições	MAN
2016	(São Paulo (state)) Felipe Giaffone	Volkswagen	RM Competições	Mercedes-Benz
2017	Series cancelled			
2022	(Paraná (state)) Márcio Rampon	Scania	Rampon Racing	N/A
2023	(Paraná (state)) Pedro Muffato	Scania	Muffatão/Açucareira Energy	N/A
2024	(Rio Grande do Sul) Rafael Fleck	Scania	Fontanella Racing	
2025	(Rio Grande do Sul) Rafael Fleck	Scania	Fontanella Racing	
2026	TBD	TBD	TDB	

=== South American ===
Year	Driver	Truck	Team	Manufacturer
2011	(São Paulo (state)) Felipe Giaffone	Volkswagen	RM Competições	Volkswagen
2012	(Paraná (state)) Leandro Totti	Mercedes-Benz	ABF Racing Team	Volkswagen
2013	(Pernambuco) Beto Monteiro	Iveco	Scuderia Iveco	Iveco
2014	(Paraná (state)) Leandro Totti	Volkswagen MAN	RM Competições	MAN

== See also ==
- Brazilian Automobile Confederation
