= Autódromo Internacional Ayrton Senna (Londrina) =

Brazilian motorsports circuit

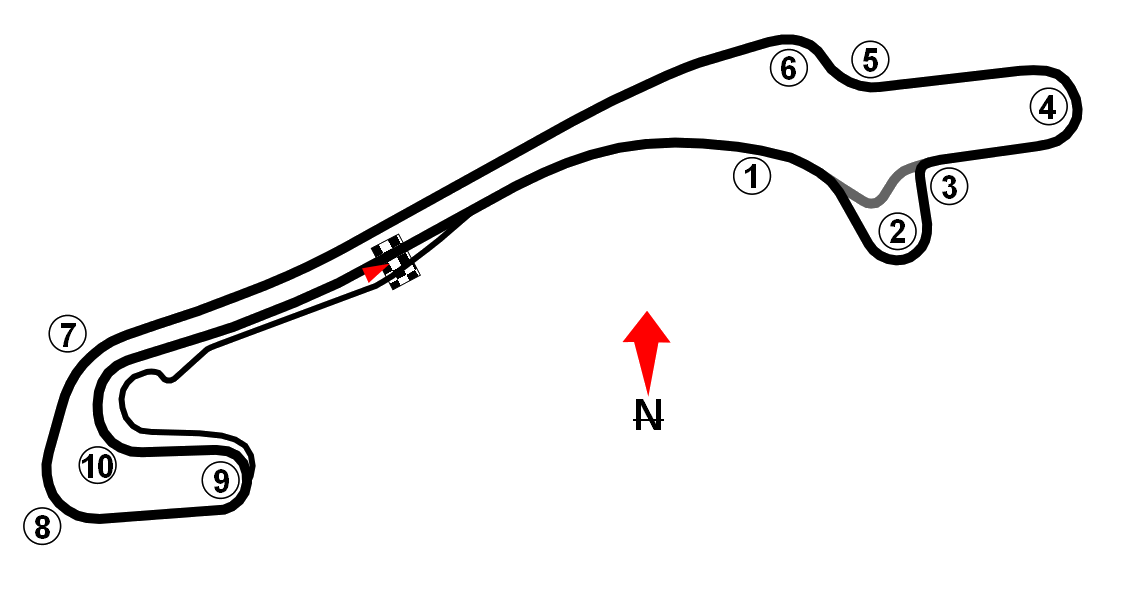
- Original Circuit (1992–present)
- Location: Londrina, Paraná, Brazil
- Coordinates: 23°16′56″S 51°10′02″W
- Opened: 21 August 1992; 34 years ago
- Former names: Autódromo Internacional de Londrina (August 1992–June 1994)
- Major events: Current: NASCAR Brasil Series (2012–present); Copa Truck (2019, 2022–present); Fórmula Truck (1996–2005, 2008–2011, 2013–2017, 2022–present); Former: Stock Car Brasil (1993–1995, 1997, 1999–2008, 2010–2012, 2016–2020); Fórmula Academy Sudamericana (2015, 2018); Formula 3 Brasil (2016–2017); F3 Sudamericana (1992–1993, 1995–1998, 2001–2003, 2007, 2010–2012); GT3 Brasil (2009); SASTC (1997–1998)

Modified Circuit (2004–present)
- Length: 3.055 km (1.898 mi)
- Turns: 15
- Race lap record: 1:04.653 ( (Brazil) Matheus Iorio, Dallara F309, 2016, F3)

Original Circuit (1992–present)
- Length: 3.145 km (1.954 mi)
- Turns: 15
- Race lap record: 1:18.642 ( (Brazil) Cacá Bueno, Peugeot 406, 1998, Super Touring)

Autódromo Internacional Ayrton Senna is a 3.145 km (1.954 mi) motorsports circuit located in Londrina, Brazil. Opened in 1992, it hosts motor racing events for the Formula Three Sudamericana and Formula Renault series.

== Lap records ==
As of August 2026, the fastest official lap records at the Autódromo Internacional Ayrton Senna (Londrina) are listed as:

Category	Time	Driver	Vehicle	Event
Modified Circuit (2004–present): 3.055 km (1.898 mi)
Formula Three	1:04.653	Matheus Iorio	Dallara F309	2016 Londrina F3 Brasil round
Stock Car Brasil	1:11.197	Thiago Camilo	Chevrolet Cruze Stock Car	2019 Londrina Stock Car Brasil round
GT3	1:13.330	Daniel Serra	Ferrari F430 GT3	2009 Londrina GT3 Brasil round
Stock Car Light	1:16.336	Pietro Rimbano	Chevrolet Cruze JL-G12	2020 Londrina Stock Light round
Formula Renault 2.0	1:17.161	Daniel Serra	Tatuus FR2000	2004 Londrina Formula Renault 2.0 Brazil round
Formula Renault 1.6	1:18.878	Leandro Guedes	Signatech FR 1.6	2018 1st Londrina Fórmula Academy Sudamericana round
Turismo Nacional BR	1:27.376	Cesinha Bonilha	Volkswagen Up	2022 Londrina Turismo Nacional Brasil round
Original Circuit (1992–present): 3.145 km (1.954 mi)
Super Touring	1:18.642	Cacá Bueno	Peugeot 406	1998 Londrina SASTC round
Formula Future Fiat	1:20.335	Victor Franzoni	Signatech-Fiat Formula Futuro	2011 Londrina Formula Futuro Fiat round
Stock Car Brasil	1:23.469	Xandy Negrão	Chevrolet Vectra	2002 Londrina Stock Car Brasil round
NASCAR Brasil	1:25.697	Gui Backes	Ford Mustang NASCAR Brasil	2026 Londrina NASCAR Brasil round
Truck racing	1:37.443	Felipe Giaffone	MAN TGS	2014 Londrina Fórmula Truck round
