= Felipe Giaffone =

Brazilian racing driver (born 1975)

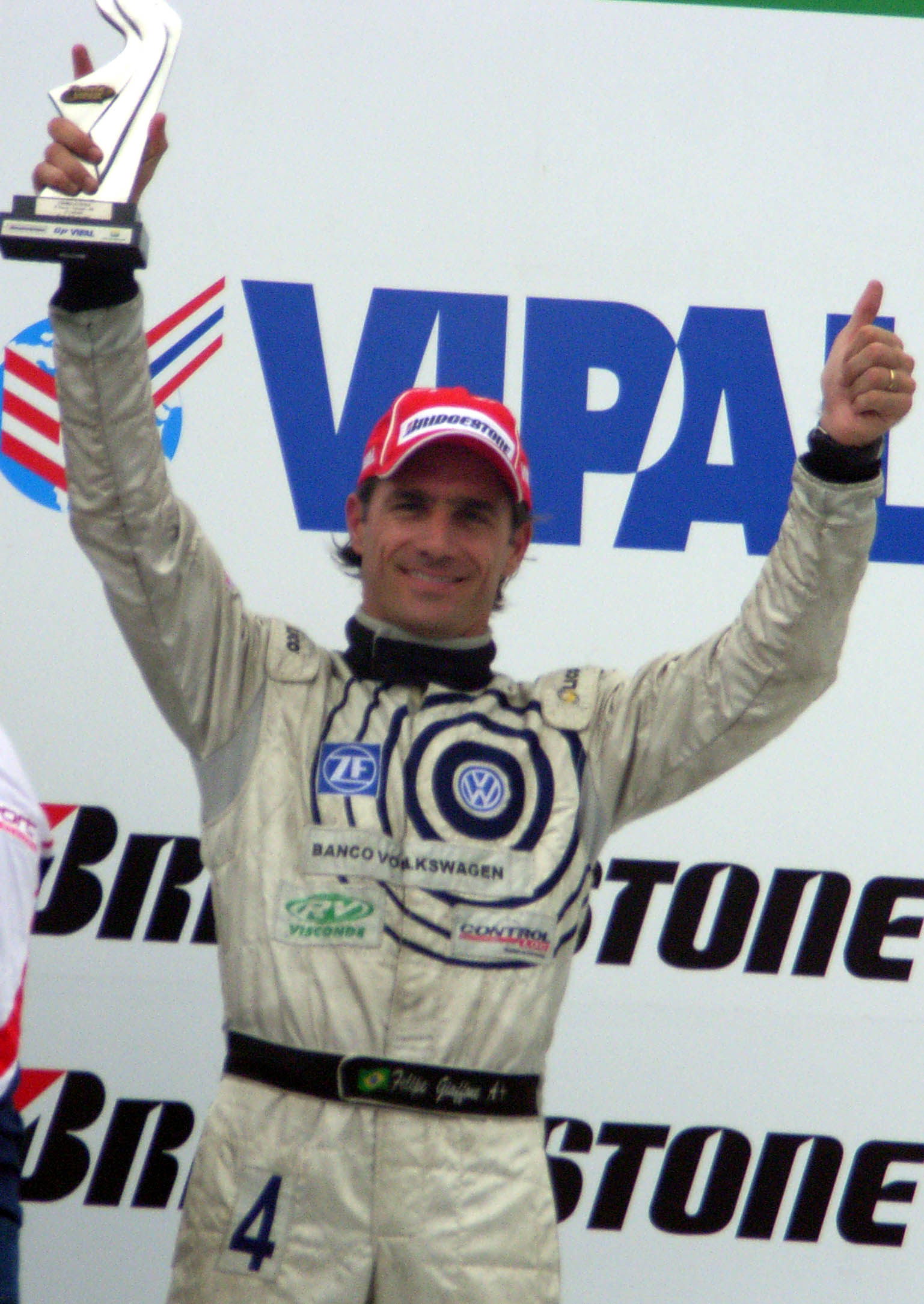
- Giaffone in 2007
- Nationality: Brazil
- Born: 22 January 1975 (age 51) São Paulo, Brazil
- Relatives: Nicolas Giaffone (son); Affonso Giaffone (cousin)

Indy Racing League IndyCar Series
- Years active: 2001–2006
- Teams: Mo Nunn Racing; Dreyer & Reinbold Racing; A. J. Foyt Enterprises
- Starts: 61
- Wins: 1
- Poles: 0
- Best finish: 4th in 2002

Previous series
- 1996–2000 1995: Indy Lights; Toyota Atlantic

Championship titles
- 2007, 2009, 2011, 2016 2017: Fórmula Truck Champion Copa Truck Champion

Awards
- 2001: Indy Racing League Rookie of the Year

Felipe Giaffone (Brazilian Portuguese pronunciation: [feˈlipi ʒaˈfoni, fiˈ-]; born 22 January 1975) is a Brazilian racing driver. Giaffone competed in the Indy Racing League between 2001 and 2006, with a best season finish of fourth in the 2002 season with a single win at Kentucky. He later switched to truck racing, claiming a total eight titles between Fórmula Truck and Copa Truck.

From 2008 to 2018, Giaffone worked as part-time commentator on IndyCar Series broadcasts on Rede Bandeirantes. In 2019, he joined Rede Globo to continue in that role on Formula One broadcasts. In 2021, he returned to Band as the network got the rights for F1 races. In 2026, he switched back to Globo to continue in Formula One broadcasts but in pay television channel SporTV.

His father, "Zeca" Giaffone is the 1987 Stock Car Brasil champion and a Mil Milhas Brasil five-time winner in the 1980s.

== Racing career ==
Giaffone went to the United States to drive in the Indy Lights series in 1999 where he was coached by Formula One legend and countryman Nelson Piquet. He began racing in the IRL in 2001 and won one race at Kentucky Speedway in 2002. In 2003, Giaffone was one of the IRL's representatives in the IROC series, but he only competed in two races due to injury and finished tenth in series standings. In 2005, Giaffone made a last minute deal with A. J. Foyt to qualify a third car for him in the Indianapolis 500. With minutes to spare, Giaffone bumped Arie Luyendyk Jr. from the field. Starting in the final 33rd starting position, he avoided attrition and finished fifteenth. With A. J.'s grandson A. J. Foyt IV leaving the IRL for NASCAR in 2006, A. J. the elder chose Giaffone to be his full-time driver for the 2006 season but he was released after eight races due to what Foyt called "communication problems".

In 2007, Giaffone returned to Brazil to race in the Fórmula Truck. He won the championship four times in 2007, 2009, 2011 and 2016, and was runner-up in 2010, 2012 and 2014. In 2017, he switched to the Copa Truck, where he claimed four titles in 2017, 2023, 2024 and 2025, and two runner-ups in 2018 and 2022.

== Racing record ==
=== American Open Wheel racing results ===
(key)

==== Indy Lights ====
Year	Team	1	2	3	4	5	6	7	8	9	10	11	12	13	14	Rank	Points	Ref
1996	Leading Edge Motorsport	MIA; 14	LBH; 24	NAZ; 13	MIS; 10	MIL; 9	DET; 18	POR; 16	CLE; 6	TOR	TRO					17th	20	
1996	Brian Stewart Racing											VAN; 22	LS; 8			17th	20	
1998	Conquest Racing	MIA; 19	LBH; 24	NAZ; 8	STL; 4	MIL; 2	DET; 9	POR; 2	CLE; 8	TOR; 6	MIS; 9	TRO; 6	VAN; 5	LS; 18	FON; 2	4th	104	
1999	Conquest Racing	MIA; 17	LBH; 10	NAZ; 18	MIL; 4	POR; 10	CLE; 3	TOR; 4	MIS; 3	DET; 4	CHI; 8	LS; 18	FON; 20			6th	78	
2000	Conquest Racing	LBH; 3	MIL; 12	DET; 2	POR; 14	MIS; 1	CHI; 4	MDO; 13	VAN; 2	LS; 6	STL; 7	HOU; 3	FON; 7			4th	118	

==== IndyCar Series ====
Year	Team	No.	Chassis	Engine	1	2	3	4	5	6	7	8	9	10	11	12	13	14	15	16	17	Rank	Points	Ref
2001	Treadway-Hubbard Racing	21	G-Force GF05B	Oldsmobile Aurora V8	PHX; 6	HMS; 4	ATL; 10	INDY; 10	TXS; 2	PPI; 7	RIR; 11	KAN; 4	NSH; 8	KTY; 8	STL; 20	CHI; 10	TX2; 21					6th	304	
2002	Mo Nunn Racing	21	G-Force GF05C	Chevrolet Indy V8	HMS; 7	PHX; 19	FON; 6	NZR; 2	INDY; 3	TXS; 5	PPI; 4	RIR; 3	KAN; 4	NSH; 7	MIS; 3	KTY; 1	STL; 21	CHI; 6	TX2; 17			4th	432	
2003	Mo Nunn Racing	21	G-Force GF09	Toyota Indy V8	HMS; 9	PHX; 3	MOT; 3	INDY; 33	TXS; 17	PPI; 13	RIR; 6	KAN; 22	NSH; Inj	MIS; Inj	STL; Inj	KTY; Inj	NZR; Inj	CHI; 15	FON; 16	TX2; 19		20th	199	
2004	Dreyer & Reinbold Racing	24	Dallara IR-04	Chevrolet Indy V8	HMS	PHX	MOT	INDY; 15	TXS; 9	RIR; 10	KAN; 16	NSH; 15	MIL; 13	MIS; 16	KTY; 16	PPI; 16	NZR; 16	CHI; 8	FON; 20	TX2; 11		20th	214	
2005	A. J. Foyt Enterprises	48	Panoz GF09C	Toyota Indy V8	HMS	PHX	STP	MOT	INDY; 15	TXS	RIR	KAN	NSH	MIL	MIS	KTY	PPIR	SNM	CHI	WGL	FON	31st	15	
2006	A. J. Foyt Enterprises	14	Dallara IR-05	Honda HI6R V8	HMS; 8	STP; 9	MOT; 15	INDY; 21	WGL; 5	TXS; 16	RIR; 17	KAN; 19	NSH	MIL	MIS	KTY	SNM	CHI				17th	142	

==== IndyCar Series career summary ====
Year	Team	Starts	Wins	Points	Championship Finish
2001	Treadway Racing	13	0	304	6th
2002	Mo Nunn Racing	15	1	432	4th
2003	Mo Nunn Racing	11	0	199	20th
2004	Dreyer & Reinbold Racing	13	0	214	20th
2005	Foyt Enterprises	1	0	15	30th
2006	Foyt Enterprises	8	0	142	17th

==== Indianapolis 500 ====
Year	Chassis	Engine	Start	Finish	Team
2001	G-Force GF05B	Oldsmobile Aurora V8	33	10	Treadway Racing
2002	G-Force GF05C	Chevrolet Indy V8	4	3	Mo Nunn Racing
2003	G-Force GF09	Toyota Indy V8	16	33	Mo Nunn Racing
2004	Dallara IR-04	Chevrolet Indy V8	25	15	Dreyer & Reinbold Racing
2005	Panoz GF09C	Toyota Indy V8	33	15	A. J. Foyt Enterprises
2006	Dallara IR-05	Honda HI6R V8	21	21	A. J. Foyt Enterprises

== Fórmula Truck ==
Year	Team	1	2	3	4	5	6	7	8	9	10	Rank	Points
2005	RAM-Scania	CAR; NP	GOI; 5	SAO; Ret	GUA; NP	LON; 7	CAM; C	CUR; 2	TAR; 8	BSB; Ret		14º	25
2007	RMC-Volkswagen	CAS; 7	TAR; 5	SAO; 1	FOR; 1	CAR; 1	GOI; Ret	CUR; 1	CAM; 2	BSB; 5		1º	156
2008	RMC-Volkswagen	GUA; 6	GOI; 4	CAR; 1	FOR; Ret	SAO; 7	LON; 3	CAM; 3	CUR; Ret	TAR; 2	BSB; Ret	4º	120
2009	RMC-Volkswagen	GUA; 1	FOR; 4	CAR; 1	GOI; Ret	SAO; Ret	LON; 1	ARG; 1	SCZ; 4	CUR; Ret	BSB; 4	1º	169
2010	RMC-Volkswagen	GUA; 1	RIO; 5	CAR; 2	CAM; 3	SAO; 4	LON; 3	ARG; 2	VEL; Ret	CUR; 2	BSB; 4	2º	176
2011	RMC-Volkswagen	SCZ; 1	RIO; Ret	CAR; 1	GOI; 19	SAO; 1	LON; 1	ARG; 10	GUA; 2	CUR; 11	BSB; 1	1º	188
2012	RMC-Volkswagen	VEL; 2	RIO; 7	CAR; Ret	GOI; Ret	SAO; 8	CAS; 2	ARG; 1	GUA; 3	CUR; 3	BSB; 4	2º	154
2013	RMC-MAN SE	TAR; Ret	LON; 18	CAR; Ret	GOI; Ret	SAO; 13	CAS; 1	ARG; 2	GUA; 2	CUR; 1	BSB; Ret	4º	114
2014	RMC-MAN SE	CAR; 11	CUR; 3	SAO; 2	BSB; 2	CAS; 5	SCZ; 4	ARG; 2	GUA; 2	LON; 1	GOI; Ret	2º	184

== Family ==
The Giaffone family has had great involvement in motorsport.

- José "Zeca" Giaffone - Felipe's father; 1987 Stock Car Brasil champion and five-time winner of Mil Milhas Brasil: 1981, 1984, 1986, 1988 and 1989. The founder of JL Racing, the biggest racing engine supplier in Brazil and Stock Car Brasil chassis supplier, and the owner of Granja Viana international kart circuit in Cotia, near São Paulo city.
- Nicolas Giaffone - son of Felipe, champion of 2023 USF Juniors.
- José "Zequinha" Giaffone - Felipe's brother; He competed in some races in the 1996 Indy Lights.
- Affonso Giaffone Júnior - Felipe's uncle, Zeca's elder brother; The winner of the first ever race of Stock Car Brasil in 1979, the champion of the 1981 season and two times winner of Mil Milhas Brasil: 1981 and 1986. His four sons all competed in the Brazilian national kart championships.
- Affonso Giaffone - Felipe's cousin, Affonso Junior's son; He competed in the 1996-1997 Indy Racing League season.
- Silvana Giaffone - Felipe's cousin and later Ex wife of Rubens Barrichello. This makes Barrichello a cousin-in-law of Felipe.

Sporting positions
Preceded by Airton Daré	IndyCar Series; Rookie of the Year; 2001	Succeeded by Laurent Redon
Preceded by Renato Martins; Wellington Cirino; Roberval Andrade; Leandro Totti	Fórmula Truck Champion; 2007; 2009; 2011; 2016	Succeeded by Wellington Cirino; Roberval Andrade; Leandro Totti; Series last season
Preceded by Series inaugural season	Copa Truck Champion; 2017	Succeeded by Roberval Andrade
