= Autódromo Internacional de Guaporé =

Motorsports circuit in Guaporé, Brazil

Autódromo Internacional de Guaporé Guaporé International Raceway
- Vitacir Paludo Circuit (1976–present)
- Location: Guaporé, Rio Grande do Sul, Brazil
- Coordinates: 28°50′41″S 51°51′14″W
- Capacity: 60,000
- Operator: AGA - Associação Guaporense de Automobilismo
- Opened: 21 December 1969; 56 years ago (dirt track); 17 October 1976; 49 years ago (asphalt track)
- Major events: Current: Fórmula Truck (1996–2006, 2008–2016, 2022–present); Former: Campeonato Brasiliero de GT (2012); Stock Car Brasil (1979–1981, 1983–1995, 2000, 2002); Copa Truck (2018); Formula 3 Sudamericana (1988, 1990, 1993, 1995); SASTC (1999)
- Website: https://autodromodeguapore.com.br/

Vitacir Paludo Circuit (1976–present)
- Surface: Asphalt
- Length: 3.080 km (1.914 mi)
- Turns: 9 (5 right, 4 left)
- Race lap record: 1:08.342 ( (Brazil) Cláudio Ricci, Ferrari 458 Italia GT3, 2012, GT3)

Autódromo Internacional de Guaporé is a 3.080 km (1.914 mi) motorsports circuit in Guaporé, a small city in southern Brazil. It is one of the oldest race tracks in the country and traditionally hosts events such as a yearly race in the Brazilian Fórmula Truck Championship, as well as several legs of the various local Drag Racing championships, attracting up to 60,000 spectators.

== History ==
The history of Guaporé's race track begins with the arrival of Dr. Nelson Luiz Barro, a doctor from Caxias do Sul whose carrier made him move to the city of Dois Lajeados and, in 1967, to Guaporé. In his spare time, Barro raced a Simca Chambord (# 64) and eventually became State Champion.

=== Establishment of AGA and first circuit ===
Barro manageded to entice many young people with his passion for racing and, on 1 September 1969, they founded the Guaporense Racing Association (AGA - Associação Guaporense de Automobilismo), a group still responsible for maintaining the site. The newly formed group went looking for a place to build a race track and found the city's then-aerodrome, closed off by the aviation authority at the time. Supported by mayor Otolip Dalbosco, they built a circuit around the aerodrome's two runways, which were perpendicular to each other, thus the peculiar "T" shape of the track, still noticeable today.

The first circuit, made of oil-impregnated dirt, was completed in only 3 years and, on 21 December 1969, it was inaugurated with a race involving 72 cars from all over the state and with the supervision and approval of the state's racing authority. The event's success brought great attention to AGA's work, setting the cornerstone to future developments.

=== Asphalt circuit and growth ===
With the success came the goal of giving the racetrack a more definitive shape through the application of a layer of asphalt concrete over a better designed circuit, the construction of the pit lane, garages and all the infrastructure necessary for larger events. The association not only managed to get support from the City, State and Federal Governments but also from neighbouring cities, several private businesses and even the Army.

After much work, on 17 October 1976, the Guaporé Municipal Raceway was completed with its tarmac track. The celebration coincided with the 5th Race of the 1976 Brazilian Formula Ford Championship. The first international event took place on 17 November 1985 on the occasion of the 10th Race of South American Formula Three Championship.

=== New challenges ===
Over the past decades, the main event hosted by the Autódromo de Guaporé has been the annual race in the Fórmula Truck Championship, with great attendances by people from all over the country. Despite being AGA's main source of income, Fórmula Truck, allied with insufficient maintenance, resulted in the severe degradation of the asphalt layer, compromising safety conditions and impeding larger events such as Stock Car Brasil from taking place. Even the drag races that used to draw younger enthusiasts in large numbers were reduced due to irregularities in the main straight that forced contestants to race an eight of a mile, instead of the usual quarter mile.

In late 2010, AGA was able to perform the replacement of the asphalt layer, allowing championships to continue. There are still complications such as the restoration and upgrade of the pit lane area, improvement of the tracks safety features and visitor infrastructure. The delay in finishing such works and the many new race tracks being built in the state, such as the Velopark, along with the city's limited tourist capacity, makes it difficult to bring back the national races.

== Facilities ==
The auxiliary facilities to the Vitacir Paludo Circuit include 40 pit lane garages, with large nearby off-loading ramps, a refuelling station, tyre repair facilities and a VIP area above the pit lane. The judges' tower also has a press room, sign-up area, administration office and judges' room, all big enough to host medium-sized events. There are two restaurants and a two-floor bathroom that can be used by teams and VIP guests.

The medical office is located on a separate building next to the pit lane exit and has a terrace that allows clear view of all the track. The permanent equipment is minimal and limited, but all races are held with the presence of Mobile ICUs. Access to the internal area is through a tunnel that crosses the track near the tunnel corner, thus the name.

The track itself is characterized by the accentuated banking of the corners, many of which bank more than 10°. The main straight is about 800 m long and 17 m wide. These traits make the circuit a very fast one, worsening still the safety shortcomings of the track, that lacks sufficient containment barriers and escape areas in many corners. AGA plans to address such concerns over the next stages in the remodelling efforts, now that the track surface problem has been dealt with, after consulting with specialists to find viable solutions considering the space concerns in most problem sites.

Spectators most commonly settle themselves on the hill side that borders the so-called Radiator Corner, where many camp during the events and watch the races while using the barbecue grills available on-site and the facilities of the Radiator Cabin, the restaurant established on the top of the hill. When more space is needed, bleachers are erected on the outer sides of corner 2 and the main straight, both places provide excellent view of the track.

== Lap records ==
As of October 2014, the fastest official lap records at the Autódromo Internacional de Guaporé are listed as:

Category	Time	Driver	Vehicle	Event
Full Circuit (1976–present): 3.080 km (1.914 mi)
GT3	1:08.342	Cláudio Ricci	Ferrari 458 Italia GT3	2012 Guaporé Campeonato Brasileiro de GT round
Ferrari Challenge	1:11.928	William Freire	Ferrari F430 Challenge	2012 Guaporé Campeonato Brasileiro de GT round
GT4	1:12.018	Alan Hellmeister	Aston Martin V8 Vantage GT4	2012 Guaporé Campeonato Brasileiro de GT round
Stock Car Brasil	1:14.015	Xandy Negrão	Chevrolet Vectra V8	2002 Guaporé Stock Car Brasil round
Super Touring	1:16.172	Miguel Ángel Guerra	Peugeot 406	1999 Guaporé SASTC round
Truck racing	1:27.476	Roberval Andrade	Scania Truck	2014 Guaporé Fórmula Truck round
