= Autódromo Internacional Ayrton Senna (Caruaru) =

Motorsports circuit in Caruaru, Brazil

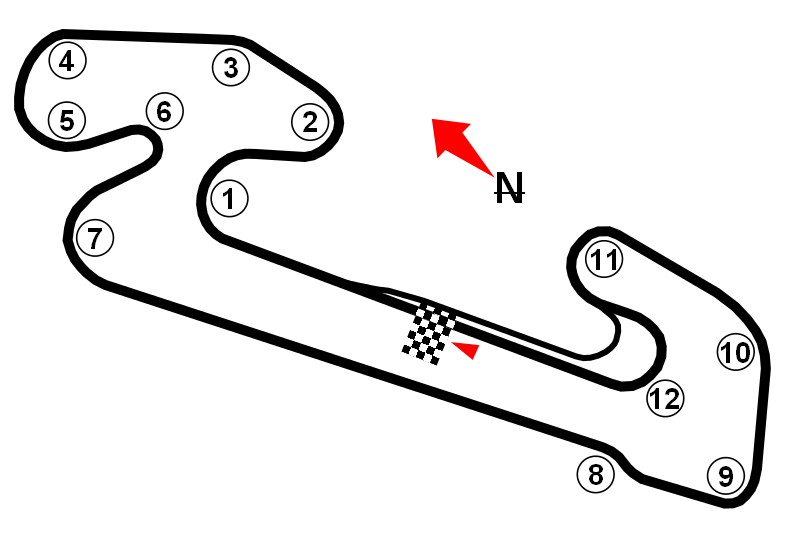
- Full Circuit (1992–present)
- Location: Caruaru, Pernambuco, Brazil
- Coordinates: 8°13′56.89″S 35°59′8.16″W
- Opened: 13 December 1992; 33 years ago
- Former names: Autódromo de Caruaru (1992–1994)
- Major events: Former: Copa Truck (2017); Fórmula Truck (1997–2002, 2004–2015); F3 Sudamericana (2010–2011)

Full Circuit (1992–present)
- Length: 3.180 km (1.976 mi)
- Turns: 13
- Race lap record: 1:22.248 ( (Brazil) Bruno Bonifacio, Dallara F309, 2011, F3)

Autódromo Internacional Ayrton Senna is a motorsports circuit located in Caruaru, Brazil. Opened in 1992, it hosted motor racing events for the Copa Truck, Fórmula Truck and defunct Formula Three Sudamericana series.

== Lap records ==
As of March 2015, the fastest official lap records at the Autódromo Internacional Ayrton Senna (Caruaru) are listed as:

Category	Time	Driver	Vehicle	Event
Full Circuit (1992–present): 3.180 km (1.976 mi)
Formula Three	1:22.248	Bruno Bonifacio	Dallara F309	2011 Caruaru Formula 3 Sudamericana round
Truck racing	1:50.173	Felipe Giaffone	MAN TGS	2015 Caruaru Fórmula Truck round
