= 2015 Formula 4 Sudamericana season =

2015 Formula 4 Sudamericana

Seasons
- ← 2014 2016 →

The 2015 Fórmula 4 Sudamericana Championship season is the second season of the Formula 4 Sudamericana. It began on 24 May at the Autódromo Víctor Borrat Fabini in Uruguay, and finished on 8 December at the Autódromo Internacional Ayrton Senna in Brazil, after eight rounds.

== Drivers ==
| No. | Driver | Rounds |
|---|---|---|
| 3 | (Brazil) André Pedralli | 7–8 |
| 7 | (Argentina) Federico Iribarne | 3–6 |
| 9 | (Uruguay) Francisco Cammarota | 2 |
| 10 | (Argentina) Juan Cruz Acosta | 6 |
| 11 | (Argentina) Agustín Lima Capitao | 1 |
| 12 | (Brazil) Leandro Guedes | All |
| 20 | (Peru) Rodrigo Pflucker | All |
| 30 | (Chile) Max Soto Zurita | 4 |
| 33 | (Uruguay) Nicolás Muraglia | 1–3 |
| 42 | (Chile) Lorenzo Mauriziano | 1–3, 5–8 |
| 43 | (Brazil) Pedro Cardoso | All |
| 45 | (Argentina) Baltazar Leguizamón | 5–8 |
| 52 | (Brazil) Pedro Caland | All |
| 55 | (Ecuador) Jorge Matos | 1 |
| 60 | (Uruguay) Juan Manuel Casella | All |
| 69 | (Uruguay) Diego Muraglia | 1–3 |
| 97 | (Brazil) Bruna Tomaselli | 4–8 |
| 99 | (Brazil) Daniel Duarte | 3–7 |

== Race calendar and results ==
An updated race calendar was released on 9 April 2015. On 23 June, it was announced that the fourth round was to be held at Autódromo Oscar Cabalén on 16 August, and the fifth round was to be held at Autódromo Termas de Río Hondo on 13 September. The calendar was further altered on 27 July, with the round at Autódromo Termas de Río Hondo moved back to 4 October to replace the round at Autódromo Eusebio Marcilla. The round scheduled for 13 September was moved to Autódromo Santiago Yaco Guarnieri. These three Argentinian venues would form a mini-tournament within the F4 Sudamericana called Copa Argentina. The last two rounds of the calendar were finally made public on 30 October, with the seventh round being held at the Autódromo Internacional de Cascavel on 8 November and the season-ending venue taking place at the Autódromo Internacional Ayrton Senna in Londrina on 6 December. The venue at Cascavel and the first race at Londrina will form another mini-tournament within the F4 Sudamericana called Copa Brasil, while the last race of Londrina will give double points towards the main championship.

Rounds denoted with a blue background are a part of the Copa Argentina, while rounds denoted with a light green background are a part of the Copa Brasil.

| Round | | Circuit | Date | Pole position | Fastest lap | Winning driver |
|---|---|---|---|---|---|---|
| 1 | R1 | (Uruguay) Autódromo Víctor Borrat Fabini, El Pinar | 23 May | (Uruguay) Diego Muraglia | (Argentina) Agustin Lima Capitao | (Argentina) Agustin Lima Capitao |
| 1 | R2 | (Uruguay) Autódromo Víctor Borrat Fabini, El Pinar | 24 May | | (Argentina) Agustin Lima Capitao | (Brazil) Leandro Guedes |
| 2 | R1 | (Brazil) Autódromo Internacional de Santa Cruz do Sul, Santa Cruz do Sul | 6 June | (Uruguay) Francisco Cammarota | (Uruguay) Juan Manuel Casella | (Uruguay) Francisco Cammarota |
| 2 | R2 | (Brazil) Autódromo Internacional de Santa Cruz do Sul, Santa Cruz do Sul | 7 June | | (Uruguay) Francisco Cammarota | (Brazil) Pedro Cardoso |
| 3 | R1 | (Uruguay) Polideportivo Ciudad de Mercedes, Soriano | 18 July | (Uruguay) Juan Manuel Casella | (Brazil) Pedro Cardoso | (Brazil) Pedro Cardoso |
| 3 | R2 | (Uruguay) Polideportivo Ciudad de Mercedes, Soriano | 19 July | | (Brazil) Pedro Cardoso | (Argentina) Federico Iribarne |
| 4 | R1 | (Argentina) Autódromo Oscar Cabalén, Alta Gracia-Córdoba | 15 August | (Chile) Max Soto Zurita | (Argentina) Federico Iribarne | (Brazil) Pedro Cardoso |
| 4 | R2 | (Argentina) Autódromo Oscar Cabalén, Alta Gracia-Córdoba | 16 August | | (Brazil) Pedro Cardoso | (Peru) Rodrigo Pflucker |
| 5 | R1 | (Argentina) Autódromo Santiago Yaco Guarnieri, Resistencia | 12 September | (Uruguay) Juan Manuel Casella | (Brazil) Pedro Cardoso | (Brazil) Pedro Cardoso |
| 5 | R2 | (Argentina) Autódromo Santiago Yaco Guarnieri, Resistencia | 13 September | | (Peru) Rodrigo Pflucker | (Peru) Rodrigo Pflucker |
| 6 | R1 | (Argentina) Autódromo Termas de Río Hondo, Termas de Río Hondo | 3 October | (Brazil) Pedro Caland | (Brazil) Pedro Caland | (Brazil) Pedro Caland |
| 6 | R2 | (Argentina) Autódromo Termas de Río Hondo, Termas de Río Hondo | 3 October | | (Peru) Rodrigo Pflucker | (Brazil) Pedro Cardoso |
| 6 | R3 | (Argentina) Autódromo Termas de Río Hondo, Termas de Río Hondo | 4 October | | (Uruguay) Juan Manuel Casella | (Brazil) Pedro Caland |
| 7 | R1 | (Brazil) Autódromo Internacional de Cascavel, Cascavel | 7 November | (Uruguay) Juan Manuel Casella | (Brazil) Pedro Cardoso | (Brazil) Pedro Cardoso |
| 7 | R2 | (Brazil) Autódromo Internacional de Cascavel, Cascavel | 8 November | | (Brazil) Pedro Cardoso | (Peru) Rodrigo Pflucker |
| 8 | R1 | (Brazil) Autódromo Internacional Ayrton Senna, Londrina | 5 December | (Peru) Rodrigo Pflucker | (Brazil) Pedro Cardoso | (Brazil) Pedro Cardoso |
| 8 | R2 | (Brazil) Autódromo Internacional Ayrton Senna, Londrina | 6 December | | (Peru) Rodrigo Pflucker | (Peru) Rodrigo Pflucker |

== Championship standings ==
Points system

Points were awarded as follows:

| | 1 | 2 | 3 | 4 | 5 | 6 | 7 | 8 | 9 | 10 | **Pole** | **FL** |
| Races 1–15 | 25 | 18 | 15 | 12 | 10 | 8 | 6 | 4 | 2 | 1 | 1 | 1 |
| Races 16–17 | 50 | 36 | 30 | 24 | 20 | 16 | 12 | 8 | 4 | 2 | | 1 |

=== Formula 4 Sudamericana ===
| Pos | Driver | ELP (Uruguay) | | SCS (Brazil) | | MRC (Uruguay) | | COR (Argentina) | | RES (Argentina) | | TRH (Argentina) | | | CAS (Brazil) | | LON (Brazil) | | Pts |
|---|---|---|---|---|---|---|---|---|---|---|---|---|---|---|---|---|---|---|---|
| 1 | (Brazil) Pedro Cardoso | 2 | 2 | Ret | 1 | 1 | 2 | 1 | 7 | 1 | Ret | 2 | 1 | Ret | 1 | 2 | 1 | DNS | 303 |
| 2 | (Peru) Rodrigo Pflucker | 7 | 10 | 5 | 5 | 3 | 4 | 4 | 1 | 3 | 1 | 5 | 2 | 10 | 3 | 1 | **2** | 1 | 290 |
| 3 | (Uruguay) Juan Manuel Casella | 4 | 4 | 2 | 3 | **2** | 3 | 3 | 2 | **4** | 2 | 7 | 11 | 4 | **10** | 8 | 3 | 3 | 241 |
| 4 | (Brazil) Pedro Caland | 5 | 6 | 6 | 6 | 5 | 5 | 6 | 5 | 5 | 3 | **1** | 6 | 1 | 6 | 3 | 8 | 5 | 208 |
| 5 | (Brazil) Leandro Guedes | 6 | 1 | 4 | 4 | 9 | 8 | 7 | 3 | 6 | Ret | Ret | 8 | 5 | 7 | 9 | 5 | 7 | 146 |
| 6 | (Argentina) Baltazar Leguizamón | | | | | | | | | 8 | 5 | 4 | 3 | 2 | 2 | 4 | Ret | 2 | 125 |
| 7 | (Brazil) Bruna Tomaselli | | | | | | | 8 | 4 | 7 | 4 | Ret | 7 | 6 | 4 | 5 | 4 | 4 | 118 |
| 8 | (Argentina) Federico Iribarne | | | | | 6 | 1 | 5 | Ret | 2 | DNS | 3 | 4 | 9 | | | | | 91 |
| 9 | (Chile) Lorenzo Mauriziano | 10 | 7 | 7 | 8 | 8 | 9 | | | Ret | 6 | Ret | 10 | 7 | 5 | 6 | 7 | Ret | 69 |
| 10 | (Uruguay) Diego Muraglia | **3** | 8 | 3 | Ret | 4 | 6 | | | | | | | | | | | | 55 |
| 11 | (Uruguay) Francisco Cammarota | | | **1** | 2 | | | | | | | | | | | | | | 45 |
| 12 | (Argentina) Agustín Lima Capitao | 1 | 3 | | | | | | | | | | | | | | | | 42 |
| 13 | (Brazil) André Pedralli | | | | | | | | | | | | | | 8 | 7 | 6 | 6 | 42 |
| 14 | (Argentina) Juan Cruz Acosta | | | | | | | | | | | 6 | 5 | 3 | | | | | 33 |
| 15 | (Uruguay) Nicolás Muraglia | 9 | 5 | Ret | 7 | 7 | 7 | | | | | | | | | | | | 30 |
| 16 | (Chile) Max Soto Zurita | | | | | | | **2** | 6 | | | | | | | | | | 27 |
| 17 | (Brazil) Daniel Duarte | | | | | 10 | 10 | Ret | 8 | 9 | Ret | 8 | 9 | 8 | 9 | 10 | | | 21 |
| 18 | (Ecuador) Jorge Matos | 8 | 9 | | | | | | | | | | | | | | | | 6 |
| Pos | Driver | ELP (Uruguay) | | SCS (Brazil) | | MRC (Uruguay) | | COR (Argentina) | | RES (Argentina) | | TRH (Argentina) | | | CAS (Brazil) | | LON (Brazil) | | Pts |

| Colour | Result |
|---|---|
| Gold | Winner |
| Silver | Second place |
| Bronze | Third place |
| Green | Points classification |
| Blue | Non-points classification |
| Blue | Non-classified finish (NC) |
| Purple | Retired, not classified (Ret) |
| Red | Did not qualify (DNQ) |
| Red | Did not pre-qualify (DNPQ) |
| Black | Disqualified (DSQ) |
| White | Did not start (DNS) |
| White | Withdrew (WD) |
| White | Race cancelled (C) |
| Blank | Did not practice (DNP) |
| Blank | Did not arrive (DNA) |
| Blank | Excluded (EX) |

**Bold** – Pole
Italics – Fastest Lap

=== Copa Argentina ===
| Pos | Driver | COR (Argentina) | | RES (Argentina) | | TRH (Argentina) | | | Pts |
|---|---|---|---|---|---|---|---|---|---|
| 1 | (Peru) Rodrigo Pflucker | 4 | 1 | 3 | 1 | 5 | 2 | 10 | 108 |
| 2 | (Brazil) Pedro Caland | 6 | 5 | 5 | 3 | **1** | 6 | 1 | 103 |
| 3 | (Brazil) Pedro Cardoso | 1 | 7 | 1 | Ret | 2 | 1 | Ret | 101 |
| 4 | (Uruguay) Juan Manuel Casella | 3 | 2 | **4** | 2 | 7 | 11 | 4 | 83 |
| 5 | (Argentina) Baltazar Leguizamón | | | 8 | 5 | 4 | 3 | 2 | 59 |
| 6 | (Argentina) Federico Iribarne | 5 | Ret | 2 | DNS | 3 | 4 | 9 | 58 |
| 7 | (Brazil) Bruna Tomaselli | 8 | 4 | 7 | 4 | Ret | 7 | 6 | 48 |
| 8 | (Brazil) Leandro Guedes | 7 | 3 | 6 | Ret | Ret | 8 | 5 | 43 |
| 9 | (Argentina) Juan Cruz Acosta | | | | | 6 | 5 | 3 | 33 |
| 10 | (Chile) Max Soto Zurita | **2** | 6 | | | | | | 27 |
| 11 | (Brazil) Daniel Duarte | Ret | 8 | 9 | Ret | 8 | 9 | 8 | 16 |
| 12 | (Chile) Lorenzo Mauriziano | | | Ret | 6 | Ret | 10 | 7 | 15 |
| Pos | Driver | COR (Argentina) | | RES (Argentina) | | TRH (Argentina) | | | Pts |

=== Copa Brasil ===
| Pos | Driver | CAS (Brazil) | | LON (Brazil) | Pts |
|---|---|---|---|---|---|
| 1 | (Brazil) Pedro Cardoso | 1 | 2 | 1 | 96 |
| 2 | (Peru) Rodrigo Pflucker | 3 | 1 | **2** | 77 |
| 3 | (Brazil) Bruna Tomaselli | 4 | 5 | 4 | 46 |
| 4 | (Uruguay) Juan Manuel Casella | **10** | 8 | 3 | 36 |
| 5 | (Brazil) Pedro Caland | 6 | 3 | 8 | 31 |
| 6 | (Argentina) Baltazar Leguizamón | 2 | 4 | Ret | 30 |
| 7 | (Chile) Lorenzo Mauriziano | 5 | 6 | 7 | 30 |
| 8 | (Brazil) Leandro Guedes | 7 | 9 | 5 | 28 |
| 9 | (Brazil) André Pedralli | 8 | 7 | 6 | 26 |
| 10 | (Brazil) Daniel Duarte | 9 | 10 | | 3 |
| Pos | Driver | CAS (Brazil) | | LON (Brazil) | Pts |
