= 2019 Formula Academy Sudamericana season =

Motor racing championship held in 2019

2019 Fórmula Academy Sudamericana

Seasons
- ← 2018 2020 →

The 2019 Fórmula Academy Sudamericana Championship season is the fourth season of this series, and the second under the Fórmula Academy Sudamericana name. It began on the 8 September at Interlagos Circuit, in Brazil and finished on 8 December at the Autódromo Víctor Borrat Fabini in Uruguay after 4 rounds.

== Drivers ==
| No. | Driver | Rounds |
|---|---|---|
| 1 | (Brazil) Juan Vieira | All |
| 10 | (Brazil) Pedro Ferro | 2 |
| 13 | (Brazil) Marcelo Servidone | 1-2, 4 |
| 17 | (Brazil) Pedro Burger | All |
| 55 | (Venezuela) Jose Miguel Alvarado | 1-3 |
| 70 | (Brazil) Rafael Grasti | All |
| 84 | (Uruguay) Andres De Araújo | 4 |
| 215 | (Brazil) Rafael Dias | All |

== Race calendar and results ==
The grid for race 2 is determined by the finishing order of race 1, but with the top 6 reversed.

| Round | | Circuit | Date | Pole Position | Fastest lap | Winning driver | Source |
|---|---|---|---|---|---|---|---|
| 1 | R1 | (Brazil) Interlagos Circuit, São Paulo | 8 September | (Brazil) Juan Vieira | (Brazil) Juan Vieira | (Brazil) Juan Vieira | |
| 1 | R2 | (Brazil) Interlagos Circuit, São Paulo | 8 September | | (Brazil) Rafael Grasti | (Brazil) Rafael Grasti | |
| 2 | R1 | (Brazil) Autódromo Internacional de Cascavel, Cascavel | 13 October | (Brazil) Rafael Grasti | (Brazil) Juan Vieira | (Brazil) Juan Vieira | |
| 2 | R2 | (Brazil) Autódromo Internacional de Cascavel, Cascavel | 13 October | | (Brazil) Juan Vieira | (Brazil) Juan Vieira | |
| 3 | R1 | (Brazil) Autódromo Internacional de Cascavel, Cascavel | 17 November | (Brazil) Juan Vieira | (Brazil) Juan Vieira | (Brazil) Juan Vieira | |
| 3 | R2 | (Brazil) Autódromo Internacional de Cascavel, Cascavel | 17 November | | (Brazil) Juan Vieira | (Brazil) Pedro Burger | |
| 4 | R1 | (Uruguay) Autódromo Víctor Borrat Fabini, El Pinar | 7 December | (Brazil) Juan Vieira | (Brazil) Juan Vieira | (Brazil) Juan Vieira | |
| 4 | R2 | (Uruguay) Autódromo Víctor Borrat Fabini, El Pinar | 8 December | | (Brazil) Juan Vieira | (Brazil) Juan Vieira | |

== Championship standings ==
Points system

Points were awarded as follows:

| Position | 1 | 2 | 3 | 4 | 5 | 6 | 7 | 8 | 9 | 10 | R1 PP | FL |
|---|---|---|---|---|---|---|---|---|---|---|---|---|
| Points | 25 | 18 | 15 | 12 | 10 | 8 | 6 | 4 | 2 | 1 | 1 | 1 |

=== Fórmula Academy Sudamericana Championship ===
Juan Vieira became a two time winner of the series.

| Pos | Driver | INT (Brazil) | | CAS1 (Brazil) | | CAS2 (Brazil) | | ELP (Uruguay) | | Pts |
|---|---|---|---|---|---|---|---|---|---|---|
| 1 | (Brazil) Juan Vieira | **1** | 6 | 1 | 1 | **1** | 2 | **1** | 1 | 186 |
| 2 | (Brazil) Rafael Grasti | 2 | 1 | **3** | 3 | 3 | 4 | 3 | 3 | 132 |
| 3 | (Brazil) Pedro Burger | Ret | 3 | 2 | 4 | 4 | 1 | 4 | 5 | 104 |
| 4 | (Venezuela) Jose Miguel Alvarado | 4 | 4 | 4 | 2 | 2 | 3 | | | 87 |
| 5 | (Brazil) Rafael Dias | 3 | 2 | Ret | Ret | 5 | 5 | 5 | 4 | 75 |
| 6 | (Brazil) Marcelo Servidone | 5 | 5 | 6 | 5 | | | Ret | 6 | 46 |
| 7 | (Uruguay) Andres De Araújo | | | | | | | 2 | 2 | 36 |
| 8 | (Brazil) Pedro Ferro | | | 5 | Ret | | | | | 10 |
| Pos | Driver | INT | | CAS1 | | CAS2 | | ELP | | Pts |

| Colour | Result |
|---|---|
| Gold | Winner |
| Silver | Second place |
| Bronze | Third place |
| Green | Points classification |
| Blue | Non-points classification |
| Blue | Non-classified finish (NC) |
| Purple | Retired, not classified (Ret) |
| Red | Did not qualify (DNQ) |
| Red | Did not pre-qualify (DNPQ) |
| Black | Disqualified (DSQ) |
| White | Did not start (DNS) |
| White | Withdrew (WD) |
| White | Race cancelled (C) |
| Blank | Did not practice (DNP) |
| Blank | Did not arrive (DNA) |
| Blank | Excluded (EX) |

**Bold** – Pole
Italics – Fastest Lap
