= 2024 TCR South America Touring Car Championship =

Motor racing competition

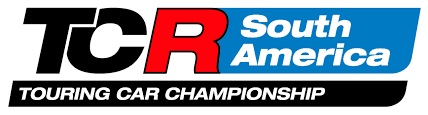
Official Logo

The 2024 TCR South America Touring Car Championship was the fourth season of TCR South America Touring Car Championship.

== Calendar ==
The championship began in April 2024, with a maximum of 35 entries, ten rounds consisting of eighteen 35-minute races and two endurance races would be run in Argentina, Brazil and Uruguay. It also featured two rounds of the TCR World Tour. On February 29, the circuits were announced except for the seventh round. On August 13, it was announced that the first round in Argentina would be held in Circuito San Juan Villicum.

Race is an Endurance Event
Race is part of TCR Brazil
Race is an endurance event and part of TCR Brazil
Race is part of TCR World Tour

Rnd.	Circuit/Location	Date	Map
1	(Brazil) Interlagos Circuit, São Paulo	12–14 April	2024 TCR South America Touring Car Championship is located in South America
2	(Brazil) Autódromo Internacional de Cascavel, Cascavel	24–26 May	2024 TCR South America Touring Car Championship is located in South America
3	(Brazil) Autódromo Velo Città, Mogi Guaçu	14–16 June	2024 TCR South America Touring Car Championship is located in South America
4	(Brazil) Interlagos Circuit, São Paulo	19–21 July	2024 TCR South America Touring Car Championship is located in South America
5	(Uruguay) Autódromo Víctor Borrat Fabini, El Pinar	2–4 August	2024 TCR South America Touring Car Championship is located in South America
6	(Uruguay) Polideportivo Ciudad de Mercedes, Mercedes	23–25 August	2024 TCR South America Touring Car Championship is located in South America
7	(Argentina) Circuito San Juan Villicum, Albardón	13–15 September	2024 TCR South America Touring Car Championship is located in South America
8	(Argentina) Autódromo Oscar y Juan Gálvez, Buenos Aires	4–6 October	2024 TCR South America Touring Car Championship is located in South America
9	(Argentina) Autódromo Termas de Río Hondo, Termas de Río Hondo	8–10 November	2024 TCR South America Touring Car Championship is located in South America
10	(Argentina) Autódromo Municipal Juan Manuel Fangio, Rosario	29 November–1 December	2024 TCR South America Touring Car Championship is located in South America

== Teams and drivers ==
Team	Car	No.	Drivers	Class	Rounds	Co-Driver name	Rounds
(Brazil) Cobra Racing	Toyota GR Corolla Sport TCR	07	(Brazil) Thiago Vivacqua		All	(Brazil) Nicolas Costa	1
(Brazil) Cobra Racing	Toyota GR Corolla Sport TCR	47	(Argentina) Norberto Fontana		1–2, 4	(Brazil) Felipe Maluhy	1
(Brazil) / W2 Shell V-Power (Note: Car No. 28 entered as "W2 Shell V-Power".); (Brazil) / W2 ProGP (Note: Car No. 2, No. 37, No. 77 and No. 85 entered as "W2 ProGP".)	Cupra León Competición TCR	2	(Brazil) Marcio Basso	T	7–8	—N/a	
(Brazil) / W2 Shell V-Power; (Brazil) / W2 ProGP	Cupra León Competición TCR	13	(Argentina) Fabricio Pezzini		10	—N/a	
(Brazil) / W2 Shell V-Power; (Brazil) / W2 ProGP	Cupra León Competición TCR	37	(Brazil) Guilherme Reischl	T	1–6	(Brazil) Guilherme Salas	1
(Brazil) / W2 Shell V-Power; (Brazil) / W2 ProGP	Cupra León Competición TCR	85	(Argentina) Bautista Damiani		9	—N/a	
(Brazil) / W2 Shell V-Power; (Brazil) / W2 ProGP	Cupra León Competición TCR	28	(Brazil) Galid Osman		1	(Brazil) Felipe Lapenna	1
(Brazil) / W2 Shell V-Power; (Brazil) / W2 ProGP	Cupra León VZ TCR	28	(Brazil) Galid Osman		2–10	—N/a	
(Brazil) / W2 Shell V-Power; (Brazil) / W2 ProGP	Cupra León VZ TCR	77	(Brazil) Raphael Reis		All	(Brazil) Lucas Foresti	1
(Argentina) Squadra Martino	Honda Civic Type R TCR (FK8)	3	(Brazil) Rodrigo Baptista		1–3, 5–6, 9–10	(Brazil) Diego Nunes	1
(Argentina) Squadra Martino	Honda Civic Type R TCR (FK8)	9	(Brazil) Nelson Piquet Jr.		4	—N/a	
(Argentina) Squadra Martino	Honda Civic Type R TCR (FK8)	15	(Uruguay) Enrique Maglione	T	All	(Uruguay) Rodrigo Aramendia	1
(Argentina) Squadra Martino	Honda Civic Type R TCR (FK8)	33	(Panama) Luis Ramírez		7	—N/a	
(Argentina) Squadra Martino	Honda Civic Type R TCR (FK8)	34	(Brazil) Fabio Casagrande	T	1–8	(Argentina) Franco Coscia	1
(Argentina) Squadra Martino	Honda Civic Type R TCR (FK8)	38	(Argentina) Matías Cravero		7–10	—N/a	
(Argentina) Squadra Martino	Honda Civic Type R TCR (FK8)	47	(Argentina) Norberto Fontana		5–6, 8	—N/a	
(Argentina) Squadra Martino	Honda Civic Type R TCR (FK8)	85	(Argentina) Tiago Pernía		9	—N/a	
(Argentina) Squadra Martino	Honda Civic Type R TCR (FL5)	60	(Uruguay) Juan Manuel Casella		All	(Argentina) Ignacio Montenegro	1
(Argentina) Paladini Racing	Toyota GR Corolla Sport TCR	5	(Argentina) Fabián Yannantuoni		1–4, 6–7, 9–10	(Spain) Enric Bordás Cotes	1
(Argentina) Paladini Racing	Toyota GR Corolla Sport TCR	13	(Argentina) Fabricio Pezzini		1	(Argentina) Juan Pablo Bessone	1
(Argentina) Paladini Racing	Toyota GR Corolla Sport TCR	16	(Argentina) Juan Ángel Rosso		All	(Argentina) Facundo Marques	1
(Argentina) Paladini Racing	Toyota GR Corolla Sport TCR	18	(Uruguay) Carlos Silva	T	5	—N/a	
(Argentina) Paladini Racing	Toyota GR Corolla Sport TCR	19	(Argentina) Matias Chas	T	7	—N/a	
(Argentina) Paladini Racing	Toyota GR Corolla Sport TCR	51	(Mexico) Jake Cosío		8	—N/a	
(Argentina) Paladini Racing	Toyota GR Corolla Sport TCR	61	(Uruguay) Diego Noceti		6	—N/a	
(Argentina) Paladini Racing	Toyota GR Corolla Sport TCR	73	(Argentina) Diego Gutiérrez	T	2–5, 8	—N/a	
(Argentina) PMO Racing	Peugeot 308 TCR	8	(Brazil) Rafael Suzuki		3–9	—N/a	
(Argentina) PMO Racing	Peugeot 308 TCR	27	(Brazil) Marcos Regadas	T	2–5, 8	—N/a	
(Argentina) PMO Racing	Peugeot 308 TCR	10	(Argentina) Damián Fineschi		10	—N/a	
(Argentina) PMO Racing	Peugeot 308 TCR	44	(Argentina) Leonel Pernía		2–4, 6–10	—N/a	
(Argentina) PMO Racing	Peugeot 308 TCR	88	(Brazil) Werner Neugebauer		1	(Brazil) Caca Bueno	1
(Brazil) BRB Banco de Brasília by PMO Racing	Peugeot 308 TCR	43	(Brazil) Pedro Cardoso		All	(Brazil) Celso Neto	1
Toyota Team Argentina	Toyota GR Corolla Sport TCR	17	(Argentina) Matías Rossi		2–10	—N/a	
Toyota Team Argentina	Toyota GR Corolla Sport TCR	42	(Argentina) José María López		8	—N/a	
(Argentina) PMO - Full Time Sports	Lynk & Co 03 TCR	27	(Brazil) Marcos Regadas	T	1	(Brazil) Rafael Suzuki	1
(Argentina) PMO - Full Time Sports	Lynk & Co 03 TCR	55	(Brazil) Lucas Fecury		1	(Brazil) Arthur Leist	1
(Spain) GOAT Racing	Honda Civic Type R TCR (FL5)	62	(Serbia) Dušan Borković	W	4–5	—N/a	
(Spain) GOAT Racing	Honda Civic Type R TCR (FL5)	186	(Argentina) Esteban Guerrieri	W	4–5	—N/a	
(Spain) GOAT Racing	Honda Civic Type R TCR (FL5)	199	(Italy) Marco Butti	W	4–5	—N/a	
(Italy) BRC Hyundai N Squadra Corse	Hyundai Elantra N TCR (2024)	105	(Hungary) Norbert Michelisz	W	4–5	—N/a	
(Italy) BRC Hyundai N Squadra Corse	Hyundai Elantra N TCR (2024)	129	(Argentina) Néstor Girolami	W	4–5	—N/a	
(Italy) BRC Hyundai N Squadra Corse	Hyundai Elantra N TCR (2024)	196	(Spain) Mikel Azcona	W	4–5	—N/a	
(Sweden) Lynk & Co Cyan Racing	Lynk & Co 03 FL TCR	111	(Sweden) Thed Björk	W	4–5	—N/a	
(Sweden) Lynk & Co Cyan Racing	Lynk & Co 03 FL TCR	112	(Uruguay) Santiago Urrutia	W	4–5	—N/a	
(Sweden) Lynk & Co Cyan Racing	Lynk & Co 03 FL TCR	155	(China) Ma Qing Hua	W	4–5	—N/a	
(Sweden) Lynk & Co Cyan Racing	Lynk & Co 03 FL TCR	168	(France) Yann Ehrlacher	W	4–5	—N/a	
(Spain) Volcano Motorsport	Audi RS 3 LMS TCR (2021)	127	(France) John Filippi	W	4–5	—N/a	

Icon	Class
T	Eligible for TCR Trophy
W	Eligible for TCR World Tour

== Results ==
=== Season summary ===
Rnd.		Circuit	Pole position	Fastest lap	Winning driver	Winning team	Winning Trophy driver
1		(Brazil) Interlagos I	(Uruguay) Juan Manuel Casella (Argentina) Ignacio Montenegro	(Brazil) Raphael Reis (Brazil) Lucas Foresti	(Brazil) Raphael Reis (Brazil) Lucas Foresti	(Brazil) W2 ProGP	(Brazil) Guilherme Reischl
2	2	(Brazil) Cascavel	(Brazil) Rodrigo Baptista	(Brazil) Rodrigo Baptista	(Brazil) Rodrigo Baptista	(Argentina) Squadra Martino	(Brazil) Fabio Casagrande
2	3	(Brazil) Cascavel		(Uruguay) Juan Manuel Casella	(Argentina) Fabián Yannantuoni	(Argentina) Paladini Racing	(Brazil) Fabio Casagrande
3	4	(Brazil) Velo Città	(Brazil) Pedro Cardoso (Note: Pedro Cardoso set the fastest time in qualifying but has to serve a 5-place grid penalty for causing a collision at Cascavel. Leonel Pernía, who set the second fastest time, started the race from pole position.)	(Argentina) Leonel Pernía	(Argentina) Leonel Pernía	(Argentina) PMO Racing	(Brazil) Fabio Casagrande
3	5	(Brazil) Velo Città		(Brazil) Rafael Suzuki	(Brazil) Rafael Suzuki	(Argentina) PMO Racing	(Brazil) Marcos Regadas
4	6	(Brazil) Interlagos II	(Brazil) Raphael Reis (Note: Actual pole position was taken by TCR World Tour driver Santiago Urrutia.)	(Brazil) Rafael Suzuki (Note: Actual fastest lap of the race was taken by TCR World Tour driver Esteban Guerrieri.)	(Brazil) Rafael Suzuki (Note: Actual victory in the race was taken by TCR World Tour driver Esteban Guerrieri.)	(Argentina) PMO Racing (Note: Actual victory in the race was taken by TCR World Tour team GOAT Racing.)	(Brazil) Guilherme Reischl
4	7	(Brazil) Interlagos II		(Brazil) Galid Osman (Note: Actual fastest lap of the race was taken by TCR World Tour driver Yann Ehrlacher.)	(Brazil) Rafael Suzuki (Note: Actual victory in the race was taken by TCR World Tour driver Norbert Michelisz.)	(Argentina) PMO Racing (Note: Actual victory in the race was taken by TCR World Tour team BRC Hyundai N Squadra Corse.)	(Uruguay) Enrique Maglione
5	8	(Uruguay) El Pinar	(Brazil) Pedro Cardoso (Note: Actual pole position was taken by TCR World Tour driver Yann Ehrlacher.)	(Brazil) Rafael Suzuki	(Brazil) Pedro Cardoso (Note: Actual victory in the race was taken by TCR World Tour driver Yann Ehrlacher.)	(Brazil) BRB Banco de Brasília by PMO Racing (Note: Actual victory in the race was taken by TCR World Tour team Cyan Racing Lynk & Co.)	(Brazil) Fabio Casagrande
5	9	(Uruguay) El Pinar		(Brazil) Pedro Cardoso	(Brazil) Pedro Cardoso (Note: Actual victory in the race was taken by TCR World Tour driver Thed Björk.)	(Brazil) BRB Banco de Brasília by PMO Racing	(Brazil) Fabio Casagrande
6	10	(Uruguay) Mercedes	(Brazil) Raphael Reis	(Brazil) Pedro Cardoso	(Brazil) Raphael Reis (Note: Pedro Cardoso originally won the race, but later received a 5-second time penalty for causing a collision. Raphael Reis, initially classified second, thus inherited the win.)	(Brazil) W2 ProGP	(Uruguay) Enrique Maglione
6	11	(Uruguay) Mercedes		(Brazil) Galid Osman	(Argentina) Leonel Pernía	(Argentina) PMO Racing	(Brazil) Fabio Casagrande
7	12	(Argentina) Circuito San Juan Villicum	(Argentina) Matías Rossi	(Argentina) Matías Cravero	(Argentina) Matías Rossi	Toyota Team Argentina	(Uruguay) Enrique Maglione
7	13	(Argentina) Circuito San Juan Villicum		(Brazil) Rafael Suzuki	(Argentina) Matías Rossi	Toyota Team Argentina	(Uruguay) Enrique Maglione
8	14	(Argentina) Buenos Aires		(Argentina) Matías Cravero	(Brazil) Galid Osman	(Brazil) W2 Shell V-Power	(Brazil) Marcos Regadas
8	15	(Argentina) Buenos Aires	(Argentina) Matías Cravero	(Argentina) José María López	(Uruguay) Juan Manuel Casella	(Argentina) Squadra Martino	(Uruguay) Enrique Maglione
9	16	(Argentina) Termas de Río Hondo	(Brazil) Rodrigo Baptista	(Uruguay) Juan Manuel Casella	(Uruguay) Juan Manuel Casella	(Argentina) Squadra Martino	(Uruguay) Enrique Maglione
9	17	(Argentina) Termas de Río Hondo		(Brazil) Galid Osman	(Brazil) Galid Osman (Note: Leonel Pernía originally won the race, but was later disqualified due to the launch control system on his car not conforming with the TCR Technical Regulations. Galid Osman, initially classified second, thus inherited the win.)	(Brazil) W2 Shell V-Power	(Uruguay) Enrique Maglione
10	18	(Argentina) Rosario	(Brazil) Pedro Cardoso	(Brazil) Pedro Cardoso	(Brazil) Pedro Cardoso	(Brazil) BRB Banco de Brasília by PMO Racing	(Uruguay) Enrique Maglione
10	19	(Argentina) Rosario		(Argentina) Leonel Pernía	(Argentina) Matías Rossi	Toyota Team Argentina	No finishers

== Championship standings ==
Scoring system

Position	1st	2nd	3rd	4th	5th	6th	7th	8th	9th	10th	11th	12th	13th	14th	15th
Qualifying	10	7	5	4	3	2	1	—N/a							
Sprint Race 1 & Endurance	40	35	30	27	24	21	18	15	13	11	9	7	5	3	1
Sprint Race 2	35	30	27	24	21	18	15	13	11	9	7	5	3	2	1

=== Drivers' championship ===
Pos.	Driver	INT (Brazil)	CAS (Brazil)		VEL (Brazil)		INT (Brazil)		ELP (Uruguay)		PCM (Uruguay)		VIL (Argentina)		BUE (Argentina)		TER (Argentina)		ROS (Argentina)		Points
Pos.	Driver	EDC	RD1	RD2	RD1	RD2	RD1	RD2	RD1	RD2	RD1	RD2	RD1	RD2	RD1	RD2	RD1	RD2	RD1	RD2	Points
1	(Brazil) Pedro Cardoso	2^{5}	3^{6}	Ret	4^{1}	6	15^{5}	(18)	8^{1}	2	2^{2}	3	9	Ret	5	4^{4}	6	DSQ	1^{1}	4	466
2	(Uruguay) Juan Manuel Casella	DSQ^{1}	5^{4}	5	(7)	(9)	16^{7}	Ret	13^{5}	13	4	2	2^{2}	2	4	1^{3}	1^{3}	2	7	12†	428
3	(Brazil) Raphael Reis	1^{2}	6^{5}	(13)	8^{6}	2	17^{1}	10	15	15	1^{1}	6	6	6	16†	7^{6}	5^{2}	(8)	4^{4}	3	428
4	(Argentina) Matías Rossi		(15)^{3}	4	2^{4}	5	23†	DNS	10^{2}	22†	6	8	1^{1}	1	11†	6^{5}	3^{4}	9	2^{2}	1	408
5	(Argentina) Juan Ángel Rosso	7^{6}	4^{7}	2	5^{7}	3	12^{3}	(17)	9^{3}	11	Ret	DNS	8^{7}	5	3	5^{7}	9	5	5	6	400
6	(Argentina) Leonel Pernía		7	3	1^{2}	4	22†	DNS			3	1	4^{4}	11	7	3^{2}	4^{6}	DSQ	3^{3}	5	363
7	(Brazil) Galid Osman	11†^{3}	2^{2}	Ret	3^{5}	7	Ret^{6}	Ret	Ret	16	9^{5}	4	7^{5}	3	1	10	7	1	10	10	328
8	(Brazil) Rafael Suzuki	12†^{7}			9	1	10^{2}	8	14^{7}	14	DNS^{6}	11	5^{6}	4	8	8	DSQ^{5}	DNS			271
9	(Brazil) Rodrigo Baptista	Ret^{4}	1^{1}	6	6^{3}	Ret			12^{6}	Ret	5^{7}	12					2^{1}	12†	9^{6}	8	235
10	(Argentina) Fabián Yannantuoni	9†	8	1	Ret	DNS	14	12			10^{4}	5	Ret	13†			DSQ	3	Ret	2	213
11	(Argentina) Matías Cravero												3^{3}	Ret	2	2^{1}	10	7	8^{5}	9	165
12	(Brazil) Thiago Vivacqua	4	9	7	15†	Ret	18	Ret	Ret	18	13†	DNS	10	Ret	17†	14	11	6	11	7	152
13	(Uruguay) Enrique Maglione	Ret	(14)	10	11	10	Ret	13	20	19	8	13	11	8	12	9	12	10	12†	Ret	150
14	(Argentina) Norberto Fontana	6	11	8			19	16	Ret^{4}	12	7^{3}	14†			Ret	13					132
15	(Brazil) Fabio Casagrande	Ret	10	9	10	13†	Ret	15	17	17	11	9	14	12†	13	11					122
16	(Brazil) Guilherme Reischl	3	12	14†	12	12	20	DNS	19	Ret	12	10									92
17	(Argentina) Diego Gutiérrez		13	12	13	11	21	14							14	15					55
18	(Brazil) Marcos Regadas	12†^{7}	Ret	11	14	8	Ret	DNS							6	16					49
19	(Brazil) Nelson Piquet Jr.						11^{4}	19†													48
20	(Brazil) Lucas Foresti	1^{2}																			47
21	(Brazil) Celso Neto	2^{5}																			38
22	(Brazil) Guilherme Salas	3																			30
23	(Argentina) Damián Fineschi																		6^{7}	11†	29
24	(Brazil) Nicolas Costa	4																			27
25	(Brazil) Arthur Leist	5																			24
26	(Brazil) Lucas Fecury	5																			24
27	(Argentina) Bautista Damiani																Ret	4			24
28	(Argentina) Tiago Pernía																8^{7}	11			23
29	(Panama) Luis Ramírez												12	7							22
30	(Brazil) Felipe Maluhy	6																			21
31	(Argentina) Facundo Marques	7^{6}																			20
32	(Uruguay) Carlos Silva								18	20											20
33	(Brazil) Marcio Basso												15	10	10	Ret					19
34	(Argentina) Matías Chas												13	9							16
35	(Brazil) Cacá Bueno	8																			15
36	(Brazil) Werner Neugebauer	8																			15
37	(Uruguay) Diego Noceti										Ret	7									15
38	(Brazil) Felipe Lapenna	11†^{3}																			14
39	(Spain) Enric Bordás Cotes	9†																			13
40	(Mexico) Jake Cosío														9	17					11
41	(Argentina) Fabricio Pezzini	10†																	Ret	Ret	11
42	(Argentina) Juan Pablo Bessone	10†																			11
43	(Argentina) Ignacio Montenegro	DSQ^{1}																			10
44	(Argentina) José María López														15†	12					8
45	(Brazil) Diego Nunes	Ret^{4}																			4
NC	(Argentina) Franco Coscia	Ret																			0
NC	(Uruguay) Rodrigo Aramendia	Ret																			0
Drivers ineligible for championship points
	(Sweden) Thed Björk						5	2	3	1											
	(Argentina) Esteban Guerrieri						1	4	6	3											
	(Hungary) Norbert Michelisz						6	1	4	4											
	(France) Yann Ehrlacher						4	20	1	21											
	(Uruguay) Santiago Urrutia						2	5	7	DSQ											
	(Spain) Mikel Azcona						8	9	2	5											
	(Italy) Marco Butti						3	6	Ret	10											
	(China) Ma Qing Hua						7	3	16	7											
	(Argentina) Néstor Girolami						13	11	5	8											
	(Serbia) Dušan Borković						9	Ret	11	6											
	(France) John Filippi						Ret	7	DNS	9											
Pos.	Driver	INT (Brazil)	CAS (Brazil)		VEL (Brazil)		INT (Brazil)		ELP (Uruguay)		PCM (Uruguay)		VIL (Argentina)		BUE (Argentina)		TER (Argentina)		ROS (Argentina)		Points

Colour	Result
Gold	Winner
Silver	Second place
Bronze	Third place
Green	Points classification
Blue	Non-points classification
Blue	Non-classified finish (NC)
Purple	Retired, not classified (Ret)
Red	Did not qualify (DNQ)
Red	Did not pre-qualify (DNPQ)
Black	Disqualified (DSQ)
White	Did not start (DNS)
White	Withdrew (WD)
White	Race cancelled (C)
Blank	Did not practice (DNP)
Blank	Did not arrive (DNA)
Blank	Excluded (EX)

^{1} ^{2} ^{3} ^{4} ^{5} ^{6} ^{7} – Points-scoring position in qualifying.

† – Drivers did not finish the race, but were classified as they completed over 75% of the race distance.

Trophy Cup

† – Drivers did not finish the race, but were classified as they completed over 75% of the race distance.

Pos.	Driver	INT (Brazil)	CAS (Brazil)		VEL (Brazil)		INT (Brazil)		ELP (Uruguay)		PCM (Uruguay)		VIL (Argentina)		BUE (Argentina)		TER (Argentina)		ROS (Argentina)		Points
Pos.	Driver	EDC	RD1	RD2	RD1	RD2	RD1	RD2	RD1	RD2	RD1	RD2	RD1	RD2	RD1	RD2	RD1	RD2	RD1	RD2	Points
1	(Uruguay) Enrique Maglione	Ret^{4}	4^{2}	2	2^{4}	2	Ret^{1}	1	4^{4}	2	1^{2}	3	1^{4}	1	3	1^{3}	1^{1}	1	1†^{1}	Ret	576
2	(Brazil) Fabio Casagrande	Ret^{3}	1^{3}	1	1^{3}	5†	Ret^{3}	3	1^{1}	1	2^{1}	1	3^{1}	4†	5	2^{2}					478
3	(Brazil) Guilherme Reischl	1^{2}	2^{4}	5†	3^{2}	4	1^{4}	DNS	3^{3}	Ret	3^{3}	2									336
4	(Argentina) Diego Gutiérrez		3^{5}	4	4^{5}	3	2^{5}	2							6	3^{4}					237
5	(Brazil) Marcos Regadas	2†^{1}	Ret^{1}	3	5^{1}	1	Ret^{2}	DNS							1	4^{1}					230
6	(Brazil) Marcio Basso												4^{2}	3	2	Ret^{5}					94
7	(Argentina) Matías Chas												2^{3}	2							70
8	(Uruguay) Carlos Silva								2^{2}	3											69
Pos.	Driver	INT (Brazil)	CAS (Brazil)		VEL (Brazil)		INT (Brazil)		ELP (Uruguay)		PCM (Uruguay)		VIL (Argentina)		BUE (Argentina)		TER (Argentina)		ROS (Argentina)		Points

Colour	Result
Gold	Winner
Silver	Second place
Bronze	Third place
Green	Points classification
Blue	Non-points classification
Blue	Non-classified finish (NC)
Purple	Retired, not classified (Ret)
Red	Did not qualify (DNQ)
Red	Did not pre-qualify (DNPQ)
Black	Disqualified (DSQ)
White	Did not start (DNS)
White	Withdrew (WD)
White	Race cancelled (C)
Blank	Did not practice (DNP)
Blank	Did not arrive (DNA)
Blank	Excluded (EX)

^{1} ^{2} ^{3} ^{4} ^{5} ^{6} ^{7} – Points-scoring position in qualifying.

† – Drivers did not finish the race, but were classified as they completed over 75% of the race distance.

=== Teams' championship ===
Best 2 (two) results from each team are counted for teams' championship.

Pos	Team	Points
1	(Argentina) PMO Racing	954
2	(Argentina) Squadra Martino	851
3	(Brazil) W2 ProGP	772
4	(Argentina) Paladini Racing	657
5	Toyota Team Argentina	417
6	(Brazil) Cobra Racing Team	223
7	(Argentina) Squadra Martino Racing	109
8	(Argentina) PMO - Full Time Sports	32
Pos	Team	Points
