= 2016 Formula 4 Sudamericana season =

Motor racing championship held in 2016

2016 Formula 4 Sudamericana

Seasons
- ← 2015 2017 →

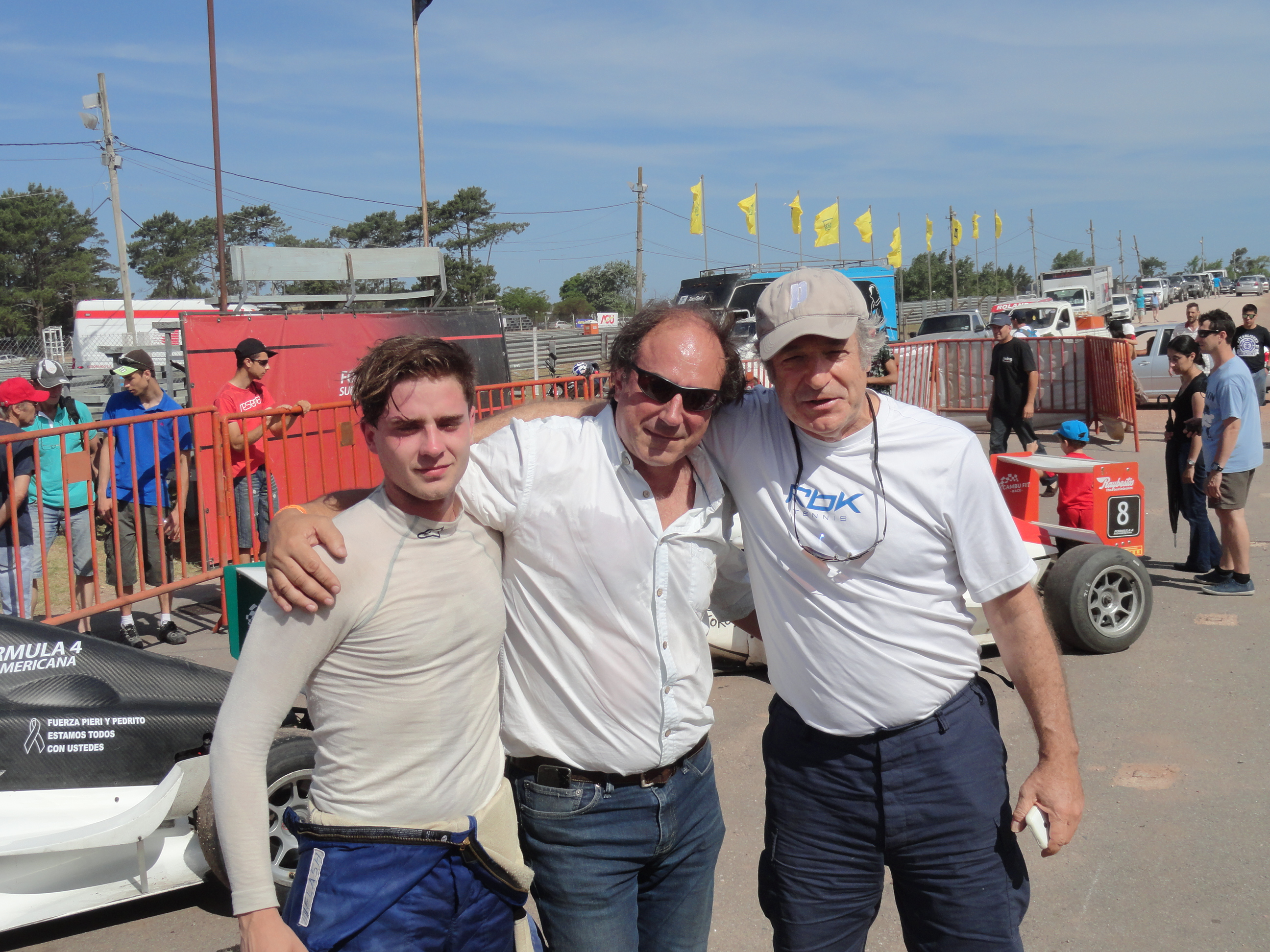
Facundo Garese (left), 2016 South American Formula 4 champion

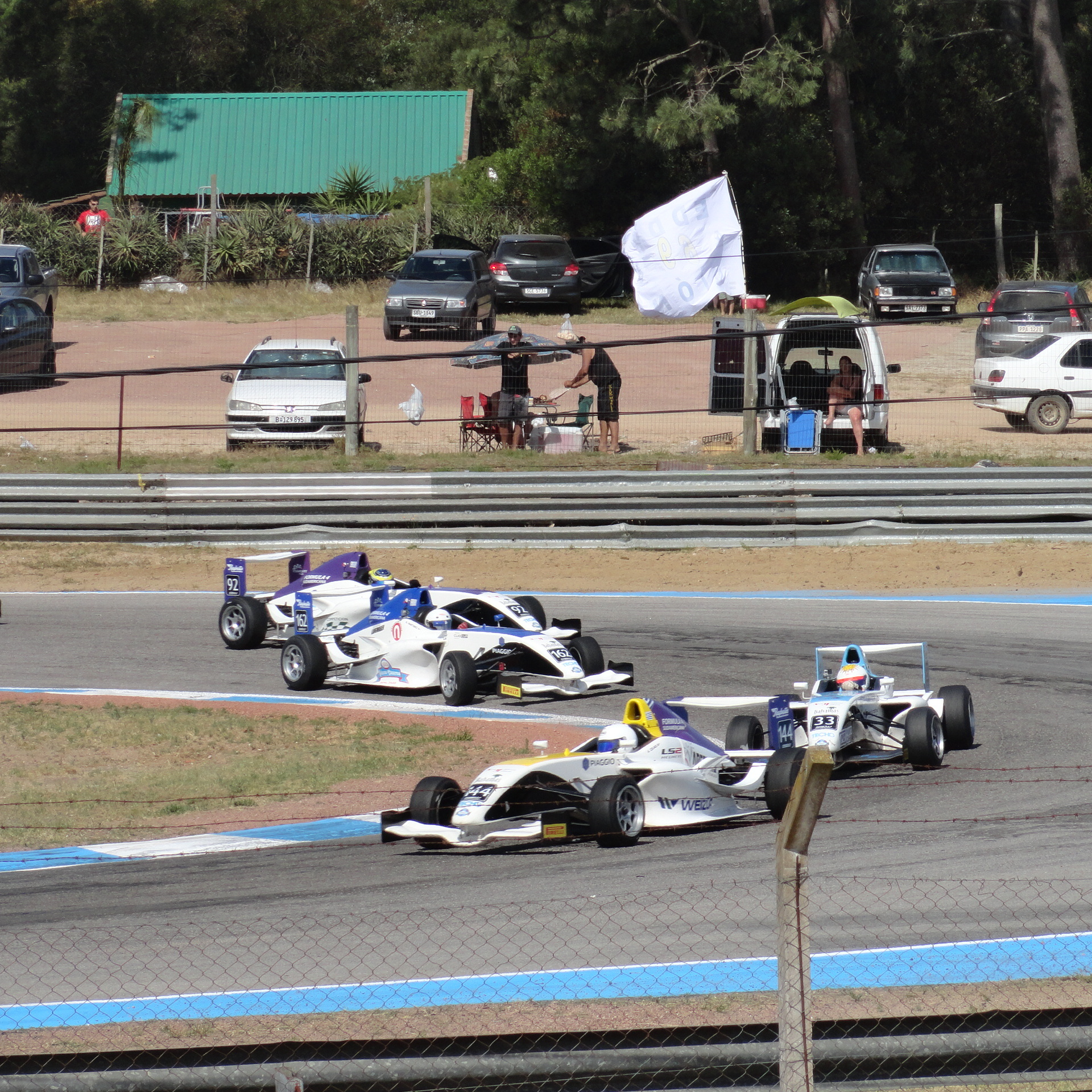
Gran Premio Coronación, final round of the 2016 Fórmula 4 Sudamericana

The 2016 Fórmula 4 Sudamericana Championship season is the third season of the Formula 4 Sudamericana. It began on 3 April at the Autódromo Víctor Borrat Fabini in Uruguay, and finished on 4 December at the same venue, after ten rounds at three venues in Uruguay.

== Drivers ==
No.	Driver	Rounds
7	(Argentina) Hernán Bueno	2–5
8	(Chile) Pedro Devaud	9–10
10	(Brazil) Leandro Guedes	3, 5, 8–9
12	(Costa Rica) Richard Vargas	1
20	(Peru) Rodrigo Pflucker	9–10
28	(Uruguay) Santiago Aguiar	1–5, 10
30	(Chile) Max Soto Zurita	1
33	(Uruguay) Facundo Garese	All
34	(Brazil) Juan Vieira	2–3
36	(Argentina) Gianfranco Collino	3
36	(Uruguay) Nicolás Collazo	8
42	(Chile) Lorenzo Mauriziano	1–2
45	(Argentina) Baltazar Leguizamón	1–3
52	(Brazil) Pedro Caland	1
54	(Costa Rica) Fernando Mora	1–4
60	(Uruguay) Juan Manuel Casella	All
62	(Uruguay) Marcelo Bresciani	4–7, 9–10
63	(Uruguay) Sebastián Cabarcos	8
69	(Argentina) Nicolás Dezzuto	7
78	(Argentina) Mateo Maffioly	6–7
80	(Uruguay) Facundo Ferra	4–10
84	(Uruguay) Andrés de Araujo	1–2, 4–6, 9
86	(Uruguay) Federico Moreira	4–7
87	(Uruguay) Diego Guggiari	2–4
92	(Uruguay) Pablo Falchi	5–10
97	(Brazil) Bruna Tomaselli	All
99	(Uruguay) Leonardo Esmerode	1–5
115	(Argentina) Sami Mendaña	3–5
122	(Argentina) Andrés Jakos	7
144	(Uruguay) Agustín Cejas	2–6, 8–10
162	(Uruguay) Nicolás Martínez	4–10

== Race calendar and results ==
The calendar was made public on 21 March. As opposed to the previous season, where races were held in Uruguay, Argentina and Brazil, the 2016 season was consisted of ten races held solely in Uruguay to reduce costs. The grid for race 2 is determined by the finishing order of race 1, but with the top 6 reversed. Double points were awarded for both round 10 races.

Round		Circuit	Date	Pole position	Fastest lap	Winning driver
1	R1	Autódromo Víctor Borrat Fabini, El Pinar (No. 3 layout)	3 April	(Uruguay) Juan Manuel Casella	(Uruguay) Juan Manuel Casella	(Uruguay) Juan Manuel Casella
1	R2	Autódromo Víctor Borrat Fabini, El Pinar (No. 3 layout)	3 April		(Uruguay) Facundo Garese	(Argentina) Baltazar Leguizamón
2	R1	Autódromo Víctor Borrat Fabini, El Pinar (Note: The second round of the championship was scheduled to be held at the Polideportivo Ciudad de Mercedes, but due to a tornado that devastated the nearby city of Dolores, it was held instead at the Autódromo Víctor Borrat Fabini. It was later announced that Mercedes would held its round at the fourth event.) (No. 3 layout)	24 April	(Uruguay) Juan Manuel Casella	(Uruguay) Facundo Garese	(Uruguay) Juan Manuel Casella
2	R2	Autódromo Víctor Borrat Fabini, El Pinar (No. 3 layout)	24 April		(Uruguay) Juan Manuel Casella	(Uruguay) Juan Manuel Casella
3	R1	Autódromo Víctor Borrat Fabini, El Pinar (No. 7 layout)	22 May	(Uruguay) Juan Manuel Casella	(Uruguay) Facundo Garese	(Uruguay) Facundo Garese
3	R2	Autódromo Víctor Borrat Fabini, El Pinar (No. 7 layout)	22 May		(Argentina) Hernán Bueno	(Uruguay) Juan Manuel Casella
4	R1	Polideportivo Ciudad de Mercedes, Mercedes	19 June	(Uruguay) Juan Manuel Casella	(Uruguay) Juan Manuel Casella	(Uruguay) Juan Manuel Casella
4	R2	Polideportivo Ciudad de Mercedes, Mercedes	19 June		(Uruguay) Juan Manuel Casella	(Uruguay) Juan Manuel Casella
5	R1	Autódromo Víctor Borrat Fabini, El Pinar (No. 3 layout)	24 July	(Uruguay) Facundo Garese	(Uruguay) Juan Manuel Casella	(Uruguay) Facundo Garese
5	R2	Autódromo Víctor Borrat Fabini, El Pinar (No. 3 layout)	24 July		(Uruguay) Facundo Garese	(Uruguay) Facundo Garese
6	R1	Autódromo Víctor Borrat Fabini, El Pinar (No. 6 layout)	21 August	(Uruguay) Juan Manuel Casella	(Uruguay) Agustín Cejas	(Uruguay) Juan Manuel Casella
6	R2	Autódromo Víctor Borrat Fabini, El Pinar (No. 6 layout)	21 August		(Uruguay) Juan Manuel Casella	(Uruguay) Facundo Garese
7	R1	Autódromo Víctor Borrat Fabini, El Pinar (No. 7 layout)	11 September	(Uruguay) Juan Manuel Casella	(Uruguay) Pablo Falchi	(Uruguay) Juan Manuel Casella
7	R2	Autódromo Víctor Borrat Fabini, El Pinar (No. 7 layout)	11 September		(Uruguay) Facundo Garese	(Uruguay) Facundo Garese
8	R1	Autódromo Eduardo Prudêncio Cabrera, Rivera	2 October	(Uruguay) Nicolás Collazo	(Uruguay) Facundo Ferra	(Uruguay) Nicolás Collazo
8	R2	Autódromo Eduardo Prudêncio Cabrera, Rivera	2 October		(Uruguay) Nicolás Collazo	(Uruguay) Juan Manuel Casella
9	R1	Polideportivo Ciudad de Mercedes, Mercedes	6 November	(Peru) Rodrigo Pflucker	(Peru) Rodrigo Pflucker	(Peru) Rodrigo Pflucker
9	R2	Polideportivo Ciudad de Mercedes, Mercedes	6 November		(Peru) Rodrigo Pflucker	(Uruguay) Facundo Ferra
10	R1	Autódromo Víctor Borrat Fabini, El Pinar (No. 3 layout)	4 December	(Uruguay) Pablo Falchi	(Peru) Rodrigo Pflucker	(Peru) Rodrigo Pflucker
10	R2	Autódromo Víctor Borrat Fabini, El Pinar (No. 3 layout)	4 December		(Peru) Rodrigo Pflucker	(Peru) Rodrigo Pflucker

== Championship standings ==
Points system

Points were awarded as follows:

	1	2	3	4	5	6	7	8	9	10	R1 PP	FL
Races 1–18	25	18	15	12	10	8	6	4	2	1	1	1
Races 19–20	50	36	30	24	20	16	12	8	4	2	1	1

=== Fórmula 4 Sudamericana ===
Pos	Driver	ELP1		ELP2		ELP3		MRC1		ELP4		ELP5		ELP6		RIV		MRC2		ELP7		Pts
1	(Uruguay) Facundo Garese	4	2	2	2	1	Ret	2	3	**1**	1	2	1	5	1	5	2	3	3	Ret	8	324
2	(Uruguay) Juan Manuel Casella	**1**	Ret	**1**	1	**DNS**	1	**1**	1	8	4	**1**	7	**1**	10	Ret	1	2	2	Ret	4	320
3	(Uruguay) Facundo Ferra							Ret	5	Ret	Ret	4	2	2	2	3	7	5	1	4	7	169
4	(Brazil) Bruna Tomaselli	6	3	3	6	3	7	6	4	10	Ret	8	3	7	8	2	6	11	10	6	9	164
5	(Uruguay) Pablo Falchi									3	2	5	5	3	6	6	8	4	9	**8**	2	148
6	(Peru) Rodrigo Pflucker																	**1**	4	1	1	142
7	(Uruguay) Nicolás Martínez							8	7	2	10	7	DSQ	9	3	8	4	9	7	5	3	116
8	(Uruguay) Agustín Cejas			Ret	7	8	5	11	Ret	Ret	5	3	DSQ			4	5	7	DSQ	2	10	112
9	(Argentina) Sami Mendaña					4	4	3	2	6	3											80
10	(Argentina) Baltazar Leguizamón	2	1	4	3	Ret	9															72
11	(Uruguay) Marcelo Bresciani							9	10	Ret	Ret	6	6	Ret	7			10	5	Ret	5	56
12	(Uruguay) Santiago Aguiar	Ret	8	Ret	10	11	6	WD	WD	9	7									7	6	51
13	(Chile) Pedro Devaud																	6	6	3	Ret	46
14	(Uruguay) Nicolás Collazo															**1**	3					42
15	(Brazil) Leandro Guedes					6	3			Ret	8					7	10	8	8			42
16	(Argentina) Hernán Bueno			Ret	Ret	7	2	7	8	7	Ret											41
17	(Uruguay) Diego Guggiari			7	8	5	Ret	5	6													38
18	(Uruguay) Andrés de Araujo	7	6	5	Ret			4	Ret	Ret	Ret	10	Ret					12	11			37
19	(Uruguay) Federico Moreira							10	9	4	6	DSQ	EX	6	11							31
20	(Chile) Lorenzo Mauriziano	3	4	Ret	Ret																	27
21	(Costa Rica) Fernando Mora	Ret	5	8	4	Ret	DNS	Ret	Ret													26
22	(Argentina) Andrés Jakos													4	4							24
23	(Brazil) Juan Vieira			6	5	9	8															24
24	(Argentina) Gianfranco Collino					2	Ret															18
25	(Argentina) Mateo Maffioly											9	4	Ret	9							16
26	(Costa Rica) Richard Vargas	5	7																			16
27	(Uruguay) Leonardo Esmerode	DNS	Ret	Ret	9	10	Ret	WD	WD	5	9											15
28	(Argentina) Nicolás Dezzuto													8	5							14
29	(Uruguay) Sebastián Cabarcos																	9	9			4
-	(Chile) Max Soto Zurita	WD	WD																			-
-	(Brazil) Pedro Caland	WD	WD																			-
Pos	Driver	ELP1		ELP2		ELP3		MRC1		ELP4		ELP5		ELP6		RIV		MRC2		ELP7		Pts

Colour	Result
Gold	Winner
Silver	Second place
Bronze	Third place
Green	Points classification
Blue	Non-points classification
Blue	Non-classified finish (NC)
Purple	Retired, not classified (Ret)
Red	Did not qualify (DNQ)
Red	Did not pre-qualify (DNPQ)
Black	Disqualified (DSQ)
White	Did not start (DNS)
White	Withdrew (WD)
White	Race cancelled (C)
Blank	Did not practice (DNP)
Blank	Did not arrive (DNA)
Blank	Excluded (EX)

**Bold** – Pole
Italics – Fastest Lap
