= 2025 TCR South America Touring Car Championship =

Motor racing competition

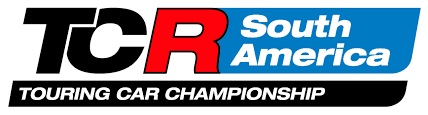
Official Logo

The 2025 TCR South America Touring Car Championship was the fifth season of TCR South America.

== Calendar ==
The championship was contested over 10 rounds from March to December, with rounds in Argentina, Uruguay and Brazil. The calendar was confirmed on 11 February 2025, with the race weekend dates confirmed earlier on 5 December 2024.

Rnd.	Circuit/Location	Date	Map
1	(Argentina) Autódromo Municipal Juan Manuel Fangio, Rosario	29–30 March	2025 TCR South America Touring Car Championship is located in South America
2	(Argentina) Autódromo Ciudad de Oberá, Oberá	19–20 April	2025 TCR South America Touring Car Championship is located in South America
3	(Argentina) Circuito San Juan Villicum, Albardón	10–11 May	2025 TCR South America Touring Car Championship is located in South America
4	(Argentina) Autódromo Termas de Río Hondo, Termas de Río Hondo	30 May–1 June	2025 TCR South America Touring Car Championship is located in South America
5	(Uruguay) Polideportivo Ciudad de Mercedes, Mercedes	12–13 July	2025 TCR South America Touring Car Championship is located in South America
6	(Uruguay) Autódromo Víctor Borrat Fabini, El Pinar	26–27 July	2025 TCR South America Touring Car Championship is located in South America
7	(Brazil) Circuito dos Cristais, Curvelo	16–17 August	2025 TCR South America Touring Car Championship is located in South America
8	(Brazil) Autódromo Velo Città, Mogi Guaçu	4–5 October	2025 TCR South America Touring Car Championship is located in South America
9	(Brazil) Autódromo Internacional de Mato Grosso, Cuiabá	14–15 November	2025 TCR South America Touring Car Championship is located in South America
10	(Brazil) Interlagos Circuit, São Paulo	13–14 December	2025 TCR South America Touring Car Championship is located in South America

=== Calendar changes ===
- The endurance round, which in 2024 took place at Interlagos, was dropped.
- The second round was set to take place at Autódromo Rosamonte, but was moved to Oberá due to ongoing construction works.
- The seventh round was set to take place at Belo Horizonte street circuit, but was moved to Cascavel due to ongoing construction works, before eventually being cancelled.
- The ninth round, which was set to take place at Velopark, was cancelled.
- Curvelo and Cuiabá both joined the championship as late replacements.
- Cuiabá hosted the first night round in the history of the series.

== Teams and drivers ==
T Eligible for TCR Trophy

Team	Car	No.	Drivers	Class	Rounds	Ref.
(Brazil) PMO Racing	Peugeot 308 TCR	1	(Brazil) Pedro Cardoso		All	
(Brazil) PMO Racing	Peugeot 308 TCR	3	(Panama) Luis Ramírez		1-5	
(Brazil) PMO Racing	Peugeot 308 TCR	8	(Uruguay) Joaquín Cafaro		5-6	
(Brazil) PMO Racing	Peugeot 308 TCR	21	(Chile) Benjamín Hites		6	
(Brazil) PMO Racing	Peugeot 308 TCR	27	(Brazil) Marcos Regadas	T	8	
(Brazil) PMO Racing	Peugeot 308 TCR	66	(Brazil) Genaro Rasetto		1-5, 7-10	
(Brazil) PMO Racing	Peugeot 308 TCR	81	(Brazil) Guilherme Reischl	T	10	
(Brazil) PMO Racing	Peugeot 308 TCR	84	(Brazil) Fernando Croce	T	7	
(Argentina) Paladini Racing	Lynk & Co 03 TCR	5	(Argentina) Fabián Yannantuoni		All	
(Argentina) Paladini Racing	Lynk & Co 03 TCR	16	(Argentina) Juan Ángel Rosso		All	
(Argentina) Paladini Racing	Toyota GR Corolla Sport TCR	11	(Argentina) Tomás Fernández	T	6	
(Argentina) Paladini Racing	Toyota GR Corolla Sport TCR	36	(Uruguay) Carlos Silva	T	6	
(Argentina) Paladini Racing	Toyota GR Corolla Sport TCR	95	(Argentina) Santino Balerini		1-3	
(Argentina) Paladini Racing	Toyota GR Corolla Sport TCR	51	(Argentina) Exequiel Bastidas		4	
(Argentina) Paladini Racing	Audi RS 3 LMS TCR (2017)	51	(Argentina) Exequiel Bastidas		3	
(Argentina) Paladini Racing	Audi RS 3 LMS TCR (2017)	22	(Brazil) Celso Neto		7	
(Brazil) Porthack Racing	Honda Civic Type R TCR (FK8)	19	(Brazil) Enzo Gianfratti	T	2-6	
(Brazil) Porthack Racing	Honda Civic Type R TCR (FK8)	84	(Brazil) Fernando Croce	T	8-10	
(Brazil) W2 ProGP	Cupra León Competición TCR	19	(Brazil) Enzo Gianfratti	T	7	
(Brazil) W2 ProGP	Cupra León VZ TCR	60	(Uruguay) Juan Manuel Casella		6	
(Brazil) W2 ProGP	Cupra León VZ TCR	77	(Brazil) Raphael Reis		All	
(Brazil) W2 ProGP	Cupra León VZ TCR	113	(Argentina) Fabricio Pezzini		1-5	
(Brazil) W2 ProGP	Cupra León VZ TCR	293	(Brazil) Leonardo Reis		7-10	
(Brazil) G Racing Motorsport	Cupra León VZ TCR	19	(Brazil) Enzo Gianfratti	T	8-10	
(Brazil) G Racing Motorsport	Cupra León Competición TCR	20	(Brazil) Bruno Massa	T	10	
(Brazil) G Racing Motorsport	Cupra León Competición TCR	107	(Brazil) Ernani Kuhn		9	
(Brazil) Cobra Racing Team	Toyota GR Corolla Sport TCR	23	(Brazil) María Nienkötter	T	1-9	
(Brazil) Cobra Racing Team	Audi RS 3 LMS TCR (2017)	23	(Brazil) María Nienkötter	T	10	
(Argentina) Honda YPF Racing	Honda Civic Type R TCR (FL5)	33	(Brazil) Nelson Piquet Jr.		All	
(Argentina) Honda YPF Racing	Honda Civic Type R TCR (FL5)	44	(Argentina) Leonel Pernía		All	
(Argentina) Honda YPF Racing	Honda Civic Type R TCR (FL5)	85	(Argentina) Tiago Pernía		All	
(Argentina) Honda YPF Racing	Honda Civic Type R TCR (FK8)	55	(Argentina) Mariano Pernía		All	
(Argentina) Honda YPF Racing	Honda Civic Type R TCR (FK8)	88	(Argentina) Adrián Chiriano	T	All	

== Results ==
=== Season summary ===
Rnd.		Circuit	Pole position	Fastest lap	Winning driver	Winning team	Winning Trophy driver
1	1	(Argentina) Rosario	(Argentina) Tiago Pernía	(Argentina) Tiago Pernía	(Argentina) Leonel Pernía	(Argentina) Honda YPF Racing	(Argentina) Adrián Chiriano
1	2	(Argentina) Rosario		(Brazil) Nelson Piquet Jr.	(Argentina) Fabricio Pezzini	(Brazil) W2 ProGP	(Brazil) María Nienkötter
2	3	(Argentina) Oberá	(Argentina) Leonel Pernía	(Argentina) Tiago Pernía	(Argentina) Leonel Pernía	(Argentina) Honda YPF Racing	(Argentina) Adrián Chiriano
2	4	(Argentina) Oberá		(Brazil) Nelson Piquet Jr.	(Argentina) Juan Ángel Rosso	(Argentina) Paladini Racing	(Brazil) Enzo Gianfratti
3	5	(Argentina) Villicum	(Argentina) Leonel Pernía	(Argentina) Leonel Pernía	(Argentina) Leonel Pernía	(Argentina) Honda YPF Racing	(Argentina) Adrián Chiriano
3	6	(Argentina) Villicum		(Argentina) Fabricio Pezzini	(Argentina) Fabricio Pezzini	(Brazil) W2 ProGP	(Brazil) Enzo Gianfratti
4	7	(Argentina) Termas de Río Hondo	(Brazil) Nelson Piquet Jr.	(Argentina) Leonel Pernía	(Brazil) Pedro Cardoso	(Brazil) PMO Racing	(Brazil) Enzo Gianfratti
4	8	(Argentina) Termas de Río Hondo		(Argentina) Fabricio Pezzini	(Argentina) Fabián Yannantuoni	(Argentina) Paladini Racing	(Argentina) Adrián Chiriano
5	9	(Uruguay) Mercedes	(Brazil) Nelson Piquet Jr.	(Argentina) Leonel Pernía	(Argentina) Leonel Pernía	(Argentina) Honda YPF Racing	(Brazil) Enzo Gianfratti
5	10	(Uruguay) Mercedes		(Brazil) Pedro Cardoso	(Argentina) Juan Ángel Rosso	(Argentina) Paladini Racing	(Brazil) María Nienkötter
6	11	(Uruguay) El Pinar	(Brazil) Nelson Piquet Jr.	(Brazil) Raphael Reis	(Argentina) Leonel Pernía	(Argentina) Honda YPF Racing	(Argentina) Adrián Chiriano
6	12	(Uruguay) El Pinar		(Brazil) Nelson Piquet Jr.	(Brazil) Raphael Reis	(Brazil) W2 ProGP	(Argentina) Adrián Chiriano
7	13	(Brazil) Curvelo	(Argentina) Tiago Pernía	(Brazil) Raphael Reis	(Argentina) Tiago Pernía	(Argentina) Honda YPF Racing	(Brazil) Enzo Gianfratti
7	14	(Brazil) Curvelo		(Brazil) Pedro Cardoso	(Argentina) Juan Ángel Rosso	(Argentina) Paladini Racing	(Argentina) Adrián Chiriano
8	15	(Brazil) Velo Città	(Brazil) Leonardo Reis	(Brazil) Pedro Cardoso	(Brazil) Pedro Cardoso	(Brazil) PMO Racing	(Brazil) Marcos Regadas
8	16	(Brazil) Velo Città		(Brazil) Nelson Piquet Jr.	(Brazil) Nelson Piquet Jr.	(Argentina) Honda YPF Racing	(Brazil) Enzo Gianfratti
9	17	(Brazil) Cuiabá	(Argentina) Leonel Pernía	(Brazil) Nelson Piquet Jr.	(Argentina) Leonel Pernía	(Argentina) Honda YPF Racing	(Brazil) Enzo Gianfratti
9	18	(Brazil) Cuiabá		(Brazil) Leonardo Reis	(Brazil) Nelson Piquet Jr.	(Argentina) Honda YPF Racing	(Brazil) Enzo Gianfratti
10	19	(Brazil) Interlagos	(Argentina) Leonel Pernía (Note: Leonel Pernía set the fastest time in qualifying but had to start from the back of the grid due to two engine changes. Nelson Piquet Jr., who set the second fastest time, started the race from pole position.)	(Brazil) Pedro Cardoso	(Brazil) Pedro Cardoso	(Brazil) PMO Racing	(Brazil) Enzo Gianfratti
10	20	(Brazil) Interlagos		(Argentina) Tiago Pernía	(Brazil) Nelson Piquet Jr.	(Argentina) Honda YPF Racing	(Brazil) Enzo Gianfratti

== Championship standings ==
Scoring system

Position	1st	2nd	3rd	4th	5th	6th	7th	8th	9th	10th	11th	12th	13th	14th	15th
Qualifying	10	7	5	4	3	2	1	—N/a							
Sprint Race 1 & Endurance	40	35	30	27	24	21	18	15	13	11	9	7	5	3	1
Sprint Race 2	35	30	27	24	21	18	15	13	11	9	7	5	3	2	1

=== Drivers' championship ===
Pos.	Driver	ROS (Argentina)		OBE (Argentina)		VIL (Argentina)		TER (Argentina)		PCM (Uruguay)		ELP (Uruguay)		CUR (Brazil)		VEL (Brazil)		CUI (Brazil)		INT (Brazil)		Points
Pos.	Driver	RD1	RD2	RD1	RD2	RD1	RD2	RD1	RD2	RD1	RD2	RD1	RD2	RD1	RD2	RD1	RD2	RD1	RD2	RD1	RD2	Points
1	(Argentina) Leonel Pernía	1^{4}	3	1^{1}	3	1^{1}	5	4^{2}	2	1^{2}	4	1^{2}	(12)†	4^{3}	4	2^{2}	3	1^{1}	(10)†	3^{1}	2	646
2	(Brazil) Nelson Piquet Jr.	2^{2}	8	3^{2}	Ret	Ret^{2}	6	2^{1}	3	2^{1}	10	2^{1}	11	2^{2}	8	7	1	2^{2}	1	4^{2}	1	549
3	(Brazil) Pedro Cardoso	3^{3}	2	2^{4}	2	4^{6}	8	1^{3}	6	6^{6}	Ret	3^{3}	4	Ret	6	1^{3}	4	WD	WD	1	9	459
4	(Brazil) Raphael Reis	6^{5}	10†	5^{6}	5	2^{3}	4	(13)^{7}	9	4^{5}	2	6	1	3^{4}	5	3^{4}	5	4^{6}	Ret	7	3	456
5	(Argentina) Fabián Yannantuoni	Ret^{6}	Ret	6^{5}	13†	3^{5}	3	3^{4}	1	Ret	5	5^{4}	9	Ret^{6}	3	5^{5}	2	8^{5}	3	6	6	388
6	(Argentina) Juan Ángel Rosso	5^{7}	5	10^{7}	1	8	2	Ret^{6}	Ret	5^{7}	1	8^{7}	2	6	1	9^{7}	Ret	Ret^{7}	8	5^{6}	7	374
7	(Argentina) Tiago Pernía	4^{1}	Ret	4^{3}	10	Ret^{4}	9	5	8	7	8	Ret^{5}	5	1^{1}	7	WD	WD	5	Ret	Ret^{3}	4	303
8	(Argentina) Genaro Rasetto	DNS	7	9	6	10	10	7	7	8	9			5^{5}	9	12†^{6}	8	6	4	Ret^{7}	5	252
9	(Argentina) Fabricio Pezzini	12†	1	7	4	6	1	Ret	4	3^{4}	3											225
10	(Brazil) Enzo Gianfratti			14	7	Ret	13	10	11	10	Ret	Ret	7	8	13	8	7	3^{3}	5	2^{5}	8	217
11	(Argentina) Mariano Pernía	8	Ret	11	Ret	7	7	6^{5}	5	11^{3}	6	9	13†	Ret^{7}	Ret	10	9	7	6	Ret	10	216
12	(Argentina) Adrián Chiriano	9	Ret	13	8	11	14	11	10	12	12	11	6	10	10	14	11	10	7	8	14	172
13	(Brazil) Leonardo Reis													7	2	6^{1}	6	13^{4}	2	11†^{4}	15†	150
14	(Brazil) María Nienkötter	10	9	15	11	Ret	15	12	12	13	11	13	10	Ret	11	11	10	11	9	9	13	130
15	(Panama) Luis Ramírez	7	4	8	12†	5^{7}	11	8	14†	14	13											117
16	(Argentina) Santino Balerini	11†	6	12	9	12†	Ret															52
17	(Uruguay) Joaquín Cafaro									9	7	7	Ret									46
18	(Chile) Benjamín Hites											10	3									38
19	(Argentina) Exequiel Bastidas					9	12	9	13													36
20	(Brazil) Fernando Croce													11	12	13	12	12	Ret	WD	WD	31
21	(Uruguay) Juan Manuel Casella											4^{6}	Ret									29
22	(Brazil) Marcos Regadas															4	DSQ					27
23	(Uruguay) Carlos Silva											12	8									20
24	(Brazil) Bruno Massa																			10†	12	16
25	(Brazil) Celso Neto													9	Ret							13
26	(Brazil) Ernani Kuhn																	9	Ret			13
27	(Brazil) Guilherme Reischl																			Ret	11	7
28	(Argentina) Tomás Fernández											14†	DNS									3
Pos.	Driver	ROS (Argentina)		OBE (Argentina)		VIL (Argentina)		TER (Argentina)		PCM (Uruguay)		ELP (Uruguay)		CUR (Brazil)		VEL (Brazil)		CUI (Brazil)		INT (Brazil)		Points

Colour	Result
Gold	Winner
Silver	Second place
Bronze	Third place
Green	Points classification
Blue	Non-points classification
Blue	Non-classified finish (NC)
Purple	Retired, not classified (Ret)
Red	Did not qualify (DNQ)
Red	Did not pre-qualify (DNPQ)
Black	Disqualified (DSQ)
White	Did not start (DNS)
White	Withdrew (WD)
White	Race cancelled (C)
Blank	Did not practice (DNP)
Blank	Did not arrive (DNA)
Blank	Excluded (EX)

^{1-7} – Points-scoring position in qualifying.

† – Drivers did not finish the race, but were classified as they completed over 75% of the race distance.
