= 2019 Copa Truck season =

Truck racing competition

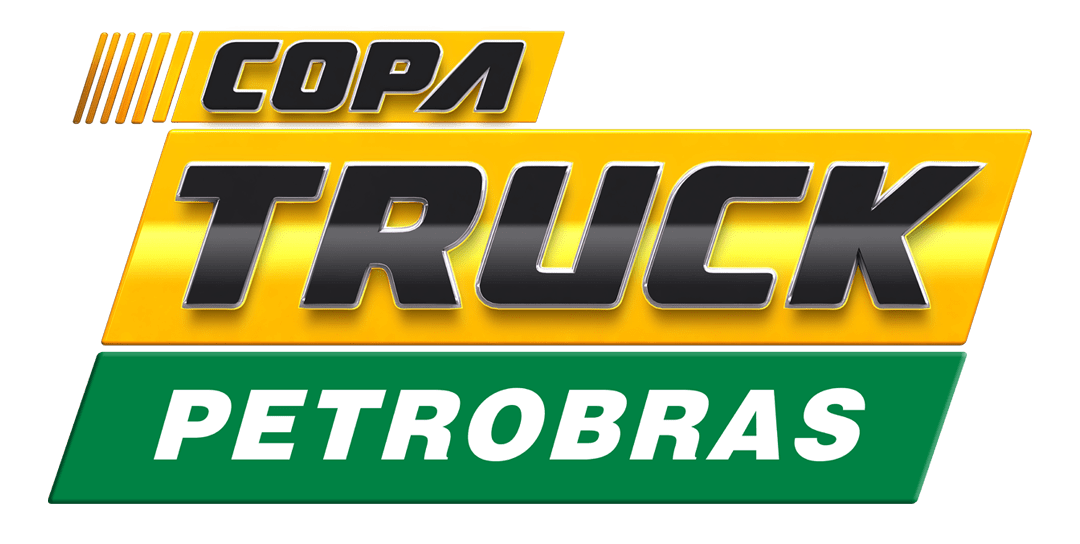
Official Logo

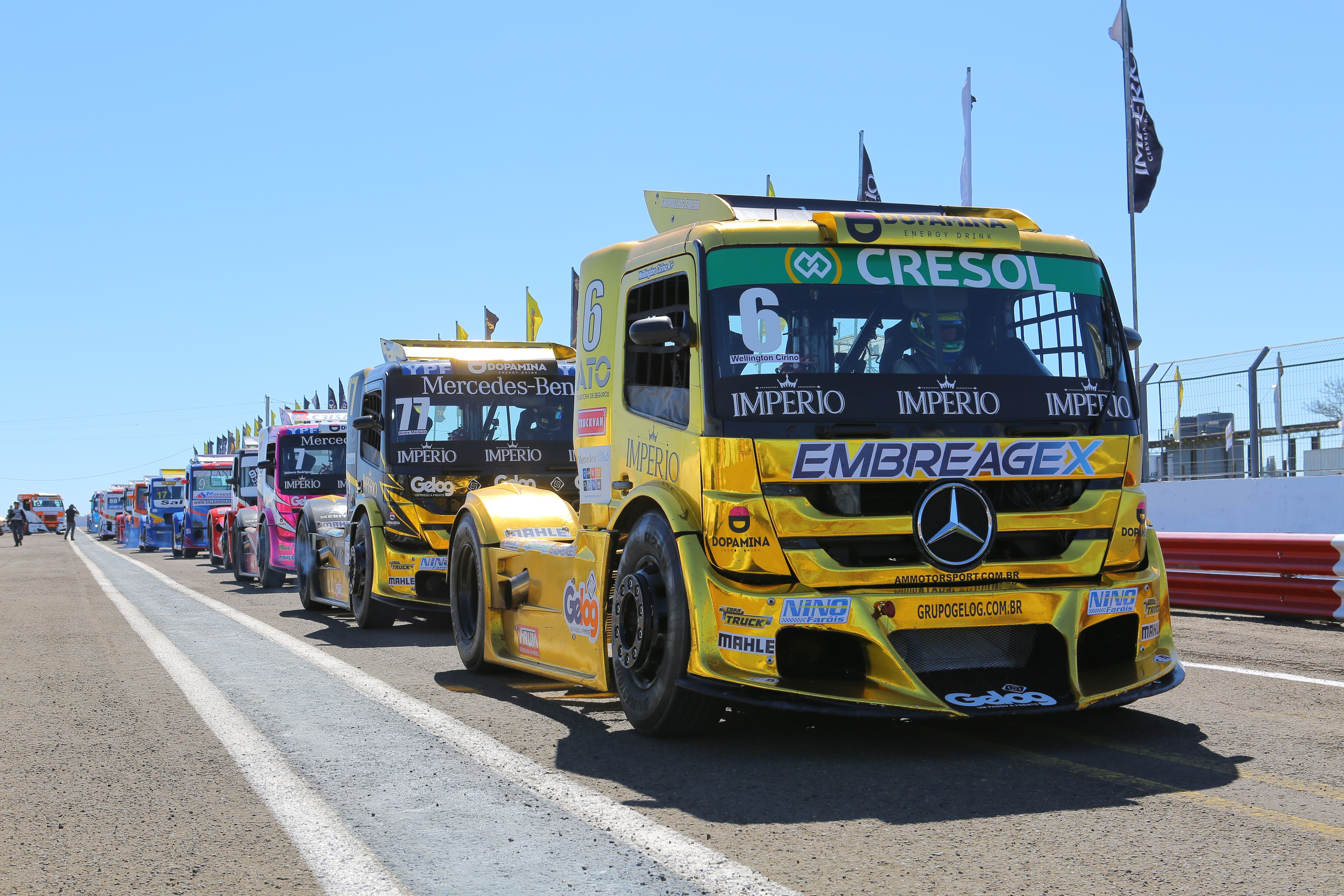
Copa Truck event

The 2019 Brazilian Truck Cup Championship was the third season of the Copa Truck. Beto Monteiro became the 2019 Copa Truck Champion in a Volkswagen by Renato Martins' RM Motors Team.

The category's origins came after nine teams left Formula Truck due to disagreements with the problematic management of Neusa Navarro Félix. These teams joined in an association to create the category that replaced Formula Truck. The new category brings together teams and drivers from the old category.

In November 2017, it was approved by the Brazilian Automobile Confederation (CBA) and recognized as an official championship. Carlos Col, former head of the Stock Car Pro Series, is its promoter.

The Truck Cup was officially launched on April 27, 2017, in São Paulo. In the first season, the championship was divided into three regional cups: Midwest, Northeast, and Southeast. The first stage took place on May 28, in Goiânia, with 17 trucks on the grid.

The association is made up of the following teams: RM Competições, AJ5 Sports, DF Motorsport, RVR Motorsports, Dakar Motors, Fábio Fogaça Motorsports, Lucar Motorsports and Clay Truck Racing.

== Teams and drivers ==
The drivers were all Brazilian.

Team	Constructor	Tyre	No.	Driver	Rounds
(Brazil) RVR Corinthians Motorsports	Mercedes-Benz	B	1	(São Paulo (state)) Roberval Andrade	1–9
(Brazil) TMG-Usual Iveco Racing	Iveco	B	4	(São Paulo (state)) Felipe Giaffone	1–9
(Brazil) TMG-Usual Iveco Racing	Iveco	B	21	(São Paulo (state)) Djalma Pivetta	1–9
(Brazil) AJ5 Sport	Ford	B	5	(São Paulo (state)) Adalberto Jardim	1–3, 5, 7–9
(Brazil) Muffatão Racing	Scania	B	20	(Paraná (state)) Pedro Muffato	7
(Brazil) AM Motorsports	Mercedes-Benz	B	6	(Paraná (state)) Wellington Cirino	1–9
(Brazil) AM Motorsports	Mercedes-Benz	B	7	(Paraná (state)) Débora Rodrigues	1–9
(Brazil) AM Motorsports	Mercedes-Benz	B	77	(São Paulo (state)) André Marques	1–9
(Brazil) RM Motors	Volkswagen	B	9	(São Paulo (state)) Renato Martins	1–9
(Brazil) RM Motors	Volkswagen	B	39	(São Paulo (state)) Hiro Yano	1
(Brazil) RM Motors	Volkswagen	B	88	(Pernambuco) Beto Monteiro	1–9
(Brazil) RM Motors	Volkswagen	B	55	(São Paulo (state)) Paulo Salustiano	1–9
(Brazil) RM Motors	Volkswagen	B	81	(São Paulo (state)) José Augusto Dias	2–9
(Brazil) RM Motors	MAN SE	B	17	(Santa Catarina (state)) Clodoaldo Monteiro	1–9
(Brazil) RM Motors	MAN SE	B	22	(Santa Catarina (state)) Luis Carlos Zappelini	1–9
(Brazil) Dakar Motorsport	Iveco	B	25	(Paraná (state)) Jaidson Zini	1–6
(Brazil) Dakar Motorsport	Iveco	B	90	(São Paulo (state)) Giuliano Losacco	9
(Brazil) Zini Dakar	Scania	B	25	(Paraná (state)) Jaidson Zini	7–9
(Brazil) Fabio Fogaça Motorsport	Ford	B	27	(São Paulo (state)) Fábio Fogaça	2–9
(Brazil) Fabio Fogaça Motorsport	Ford	B	72	(São Paulo (state)) Djalma Fogaça	1–8
(Brazil) Fabio Fogaça Motorsport	Ford	B	100	(São Paulo (state)) Fábio Carvalho	1
(Brazil) Fabio Fogaça Motorsport	Ford	B	12	(Mato Grosso) Glomir Bissoni (Juca Bala)	7–9
(Brazil) PPD Motorsport	Mercedes-Benz	B	30	(Goiás) Rogério Castro	1–2
(Brazil) PPD Motorsport	Mercedes-Benz	B	69	(São Paulo (state)) Maikon Lauck	1–3
(Brazil) PPD Motorsport	Mercedes-Benz	B	73	(Paraná (state)) Leandro Totti	1–7
(Brazil) PPD Motorsport	Mercedes-Benz	B	29	(Mato Grosso) Pedro Paulo Fernandes	3–9
(Brazil) Maistro Competições	Volvo	B	39	(São Paulo (state)) Hiro Yano	2
(Brazil) Maistro Competições	Volvo	B	83	(Rio Grande do Sul) Régis Boessio	1
(Brazil) Maistro Competições	Volvo	B	14	(Paraná (state)) João Maistro	3
(Brazil) Boessio Competições	Volvo	B	83	(Rio Grande do Sul) Régis Boessio	2–9
(Brazil) Lucar Motorsport	Iveco	B	99	(São Paulo (state)) Luiz Lopes	1–9
(Brazil) Lucar Motorsport	Iveco	B	00	(Santa Catarina (state)) Danilo Alamini	5–9
(Brazil) Lucar Motorsport	Iveco	B	100	(São Paulo (state)) Fábio Carvalho	2–3
(Brazil) PP Competições	Mercedes-Benz	B	35	(Rio Grande do Sul) Gabriel Robe	6–9
(Brazil) PP Competições	Mercedes-Benz	B	13	(São Paulo (state)) Witold Ramasauskas	5
(Brazil) PP Competições	Mercedes-Benz	B	46	(Rio Grande do Sul) Vitor Genz	8
(Brazil) PP Competições	Mercedes-Benz	B	39	(São Paulo (state)) Hiro Yano	4
(Brazil) PP Competições	Mercedes-Benz	B	45	(São Paulo (state)) Daniel Kelemen	9
(Brazil) JL Competições	Mercedes-Benz	B	85	(São Paulo (state)) Guilherme Salas	7
(Brazil) JL Competições	Mercedes-Benz	B	73	(Paraná (state)) Leandro Totti	8–9
(Brazil) JL Competições	Volvo	B	64	(São Paulo (state)) Evandro Camargo	8–9
(Brazil) BRUTO Motorsports	Scania	B	47	(Paraná (state)) Duda Bana	9

== Calendar ==
=== Results ===
Round	Circuit	Date	Pole position	Fastest lap	Winning driver	Winning team	Constructor	Ref.
1	(Goiás) Goiânia	24 de marzo	(São Paulo (state)) Felipe Giaffone	(São Paulo (state)) Paulo Salustiano	(Pernambuco) Beto Monteiro	(Brazil) RM Motors	(Germany) Volkswagen	
1	(Goiás) Goiânia	24 de marzo	No dispute	(São Paulo (state)) André Marques	(Pernambuco) Beto Monteiro	(Brazil) RM Motors	(Germany) Volkswagen	
2	(Mato Grosso do Sul) Campo Grande	14 de abril	(Paraná (state)) Wellington Cirino	(Pernambuco) Beto Monteiro	(Pernambuco) Beto Monteiro	(Brazil) RM Motors	(Germany) Volkswagen	
2	(Mato Grosso do Sul) Campo Grande	14 de abril	No dispute	(Pernambuco) Beto Monteiro	(São Paulo (state)) Paulo Salustiano	(Brazil) RM Motors	(Germany) Volkswagen	
3	(Paraná (state)) Londrina	July 2	(Pernambuco) Beto Monteiro	(São Paulo (state)) Roberval Andrade	(Pernambuco) Beto Monteiro	(Brazil) RM Motors	(Germany) Volkswagen	
3	(Paraná (state)) Londrina	July 2	No dispute	(Pernambuco) Beto Monteiro	(São Paulo (state)) Renato Martins	(Brazil) RM Motors	(Germany) Volkswagen	
4	(Minas Gerais) Curvelo	July 14	(Paraná (state)) Wellington Cirino	(São Paulo (state)) Paulo Salustiano	(São Paulo (state)) Paulo Salustiano	(Brazil) RM Motors	(Germany) Volkswagen	
4	(Minas Gerais) Curvelo	July 14	No dispute	(São Paulo (state)) Paulo Salustiano	(São Paulo (state)) André Marques	(Brazil) AM Motorsports	(Germany) Mercedes-Benz	
5	(Rio Grande do Sul) Santa Cruz do Sul	August 18	(Pernambuco) Beto Monteiro	(Pernambuco) Beto Monteiro	(Pernambuco) Beto Monteiro	(Brazil) RM Motors	(Germany) Volkswagen	
5	(Rio Grande do Sul) Santa Cruz do Sul	August 18	No dispute	(São Paulo (state)) Paulo Salustiano	(São Paulo (state)) Paulo Salustiano	(Brazil) RM Motors	(Germany) Volkswagen	
6	(Uruguay) Rivera	September 1	(Pernambuco) Beto Monteiro	(Pernambuco) Beto Monteiro	(Pernambuco) Beto Monteiro	(Brazil) RM Motors	(Germany) Volkswagen	
6	(Uruguay) Rivera	September 1	No dispute	(Pernambuco) Beto Monteiro	(Pernambuco) Beto Monteiro	(Brazil) RM Motors	(Germany) Volkswagen	
7	(Paraná (state)) Cascavel	October 6	(São Paulo (state)) André Marques	(São Paulo (state)) Guilherme Salas	(Pernambuco) Beto Monteiro	(Brazil) RM Motors	(Germany) Volkswagen	
7	(Paraná (state)) Cascavel	October 6	No dispute	(Pernambuco) Beto Monteiro	(São Paulo (state)) Paulo Salustiano	(Brazil) RM Motors	(Germany) Volkswagen	
8	(Rio Grande do Sul) Velopark	October 27	(Pernambuco) Beto Monteiro	(São Paulo (state)) Felipe Giaffone	(São Paulo (state)) Roberval Andrade	(Brazil) RVR Corinthians Motorsport	(Germany) Mercedes-Benz	
8	(Rio Grande do Sul) Velopark	October 27	No dispute	(Paraná (state)) Wellington Cirino	(Paraná (state)) Wellington Cirino	(Brazil) AM Motorsports	(Germany) Mercedes-Benz	
9	(São Paulo (state)) São Paulo	December 8	(Pernambuco) Beto Monteiro	(São Paulo (state)) Paulo Salustiano	(São Paulo (state)) Paulo Salustiano	(Brazil) RM Motors	(Germany) Volkswagen	
9	(São Paulo (state)) São Paulo	December 8	No dispute	(São Paulo (state)) Paulo Salustiano	(São Paulo (state)) Roberval Andrade	(Brazil) RVR Corinthians Motorsport	(Germany) Mercedes-Benz	

== Championship standings ==
=== Drivers' Championship ===
Pos	Driver	(Goiás) GOI		(Mato Grosso do Sul) CGR		(Paraná (state)) LON		(Minas Gerais) CUR		(Rio Grande do Sul) SCZ		(Uruguay) RIV		(Paraná (state)) CAS		(Rio Grande do Sul) VPK		(São Paulo (state)) INT		Pts
1	(Pernambuco) Beto Monteiro	1	1	1	2	1	9	5	7	1	11	1	1	1	2	2	6	2	3	266
2	(São Paulo (state)) André Marques	3	4	4	5	4	2	7	1	6	3	10	RET	3	5	6	5	5	4	212
3	(São Paulo (state)) Paulo Salustiano	RET	RET	2	1	3	RET	1	12	3	1	RET	RET	2	1	3	2	1	1	190
4	(São Paulo (state)) Roberval Andrade	5	RET	11	RET	2	3	3	6	RET	NL	2	2	21	11	1	3	DSQ	DSQ	163
5	(São Paulo (state)) Felipe Giaffone	4	2	5	4	16	NL	RET		7	2	5	5	9	4	4	7	4	RET	162
6	(São Paulo (state)) Renato Martins	14	RET	7	8	6	1	9	10	5	10	6	RET	4	8	5	8	6	2	158
7	(Rio Grande do Sul) Régis Boessio	13	13	9	7	9	RET	6	2	8	6	7	RET	10	7	10	10	15	11	141
8	(Paraná (state)) Wellington Cirino	RET	RET	3	RET	DSQ	12	2	RET	4	4	3	RET	7	18	7	1	8	RET	132
9	(Paraná (state)) Débora Rodrigues	9	5	8	3	5	6	10	RET	16	NL	9	RET	6	3	14	12	16	RET	132
10	(Santa Catarina (state)) Luis Carlos Zappelini	7	3	RET	NL	8	5	11	4	9	9	13	7	8	15	13	17	11	17	125
11	(Paraná (state)) Leandro Totti	2	9	RET	NL	RET	NL	DSQ	DSQ	2	5	4	3	RET	RET	8	4	3	18	112
12	(Mato Grosso) Pedro Paulo Fernandes					13	RET	4	3	12	7	8	4	15	6	11	9	7	RET	109
13	(Paraná (state)) Jaidson Zini	16	7	6	10	11	11	8	5	10	RET	11	DSQ	14	12	16	14	17	8	97
14	(Santa Catarina (state)) Clodoaldo Monteiro	11	8	12	6	12	8	16	9	17	8	18	RET	RET	RET	12	13	9	RET	77
15	(São Paulo (state)) Adalberto Jardim	6	RET	15	RET	7	4			RET	RET			11	16	15	15	10	6	59
16	(São Paulo (state)) José Augusto Dias			14	13	19	NL	13	11	13	12	14	8	18	13	RET	RET	13	7	49
17	(São Paulo (state)) Djalma Pivetta	15	11	RET	11	17	13	17	8	11	13	16	9	17	14	RET	23	18	14	47
18	(Goiás) Rogério Castro	8	6	10	9															39
19	(Rio Grande do Sul) Gabriel Robe											RET	RET	5	9	9	11	12	9	38
20	(São Paulo (state)) Luiz Lopes	10	12	17	RET	15	10	RET		RET	NL	RET	RET	19	10	RET	18	19	12	31
21	(São Paulo (state)) Djalma Fogaça	RET	RET	13	RET	18	RET	12	RET	15	RET	15	10	RET	RET	RET	21			31
22	(São Paulo (state)) Fábio Fogaça			RET	NL	NL	NL	14	RET	NL	NL	12	6	RET	RET	RET	20	22	10	24
23	(São Paulo (state)) Fábio Carvalho	RET	RET	16	12	10	7													23
24	(São Paulo (state)) Hiro Yano	12	10	RET	NL			15	RET											19
25	(Santa Catarina (state)) Danilo Alamini									14	14	17	11	16	17	17	19	20	RET	13
26	(São Paulo (state)) Guilherme Salas													12	RET					8
27	(Paraná (state)) Pedro Muffato													13	RET					7
28	(Paraná (state)) João Maistro					14	RET													6
29	(Mato Grosso) Glomir Bissoni													20	19	RET	RET	23	15	0
—	(São Paulo (state)) Maikon Lauck	RET	RET	RET	NL	RET	NL													—
—	(São Paulo (state)) Witold Ramasauskas									RET	RET									—
	(São Paulo (state)) Evandro Camargo															18	22	RET	16	
	(Rio Grande do Sul) Vitor Genz															19	16			
	(São Paulo (state)) Giuliano Losacco																	14	5	
	(São Paulo (state)) Daniel Kelemen																	21	13	
	(Paraná (state)) Duda Bana																	NL	NL	
Pos	Driver	(Goiás) GOI		(Mato Grosso do Sul) CGR		(Paraná (state)) LON		(Minas Gerais) CUR		(Rio Grande do Sul) SCZ		(Uruguay) RIV		(Paraná (state)) CAS		(Rio Grande do Sul) VPK		(São Paulo (state)) INT		Pts

Color	Result
Gold	Winner
Silver	2nd-place finish
Bronze	3rd-place finish
Green	Top 5 finish
Light Blue	Top 10 finish
Dark Blue	Other flagged position
Purple	Did not finish
Red	Did not qualify (DNQ)
Brown	Withdrew (Wth)
Black	Disqualified (DSQ)
White	Did Not Start (DNS)
White	Race abandoned (C)
Blank	Did not participate

=== Points standings ===
Points	1°	2°	3°	4°	5°	6°	7°	8°	9°	10°	11°	12°	13°	14°	15°
Race 1	22	20	18	16	15	14	13	12	11	10	9	8	7	6	5
Race 2	18	16	14	12	11	10	9	8	7	6	5	4	3	2	1

== See also ==
- 2019 Stock Car Brasil Championship
- 2019 Stock Light season
- Brasileiro de Marcas
- Moto 1000 GP
- SuperBike Brasil
- Fórmula Truck
