= Fórmula Academy Sudamericana =

Single-Seater Racing Championship

- Category: Formula 4
- Region: South America
- Inaugural season: 2014
- Folded: 2019
- Constructors: Signatech
- Engine suppliers: Fiat
- Tyre suppliers: Pirelli
- Last Drivers' champion: (Brazil) Juan Vieira
- Official website: f4sudamericana.com

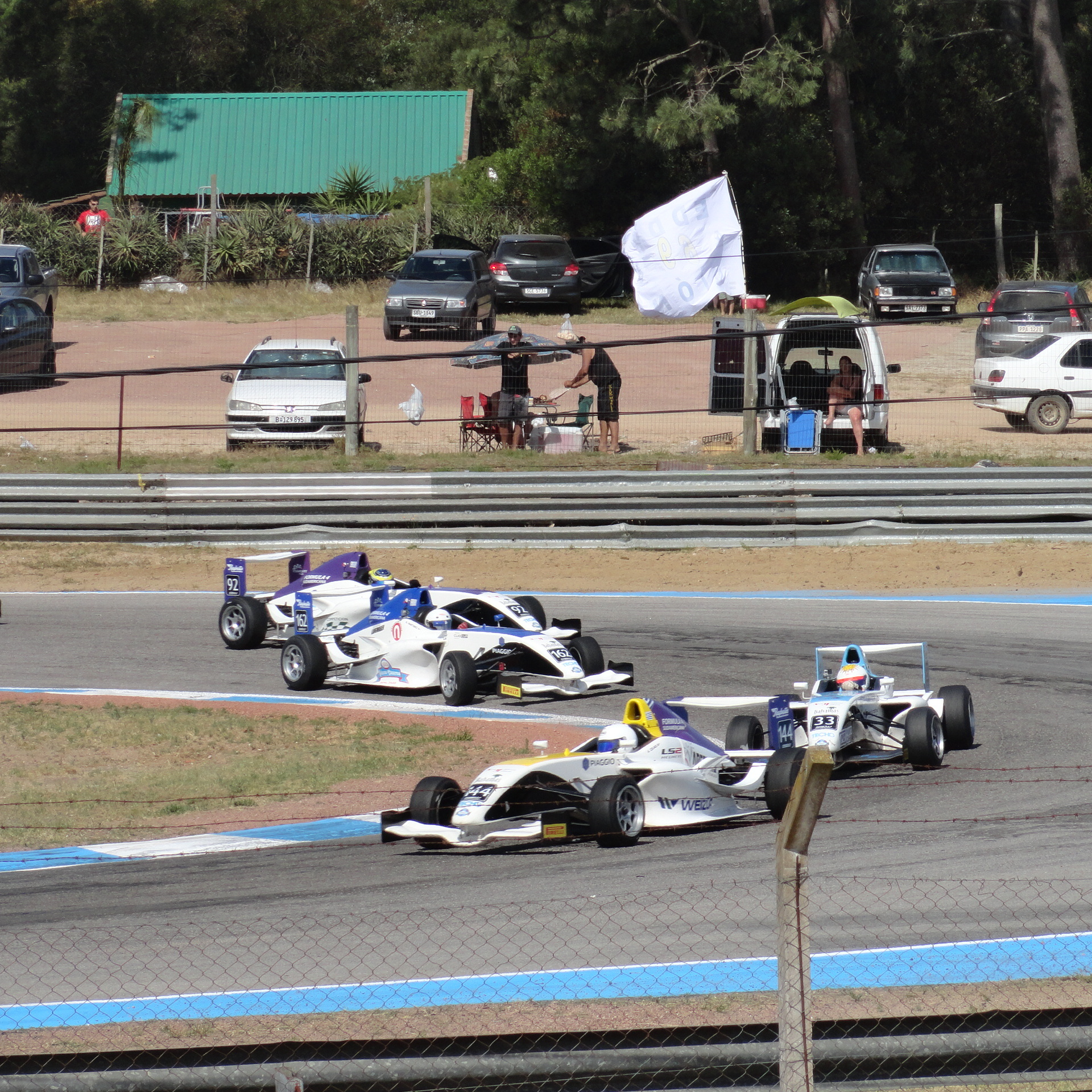
Gran Premio Coronación, final round of the 2016 Fórmula 4 Sudamericana

The Fórmula Academy Sudamericana (Portuguese: Fórmula Academy Sul-Americana), previously known as Fórmula 4 Sudamericana, was a Formula 4 racing class that debuted in 2014. The class uses the same chassis and engines used previously in the Formula Future Fiat.

== History ==
The series was launched in April 2013. The organization bought 20 Signatech chassis with support of the Asociación Uruguaya de Volantes. The cars had their shakedown in February 2014. At the Autódromo Víctor Borrat Fabini Alessandro Salerno, Mauro Marino and Mateo Maffioly tested the car. The series first race took place at Polideportivo Ciudad de Mercedes in Uruguay on April 6, 2014.

After a hiatus in 2017, the series was revived in 2018 and renamed Fórmula Academy Sudamericana.

== The car ==
The chassis of this singleseater class is built by French automotive company Signatech. It is the same chassis used in European Formula Renault 1.6 series (like the French F4 Championship) as of 2008. The monocoque is made out of carbon fiber. The car is powered by a 1.8L Fiat E.torQ engine. The engine puts out 160hp.

== Circuits ==
- (Argentina) Autódromo Ciudad de Concordia (2014)
- (Uruguay) Autódromo Eduardo Prudêncio Cabrera (2016)
- (Brazil) Autódromo Internacional Ayrton Senna (Londrina) (2015, 2018)
- (Brazil) Autódromo Internacional de Cascavel (2015, 2019)
- (Brazil) Autódromo Internacional de Santa Cruz do Sul (2015)
- (Brazil) Autódromo Internacional de Tarumã (2014)
- (Argentina) Autódromo Oscar Cabalén (2015)
- (Argentina) Autódromo Santiago Yaco Guarnieri (2015)
- (Argentina) Autódromo Termas de Río Hondo (2015)
- (Brazil) Autódromo Velo Città (2018)
- (Uruguay) Autódromo Víctor Borrat Fabini (2014–2016, 2018–2019)
- (Brazil) Interlagos Circuit (2018–2019)
- (Uruguay) Polideportivo Ciudad de Mercedes (2014–2016)

== Champions ==
Season	Champion	Secondary Class Champion
2014	(Brazil) Bruno Baptista	not awarded
2015	(Brazil) Pedro Cardoso	A: (Peru) Rodrigo Pflucker; B: (Brazil) Pedro Cardoso
2016	(Uruguay) Facundo Garese	not awarded
2017	Not held	
2018	(Brazil) Juan Vieira	not awarded
2019	(Brazil) Juan Vieira	not awarded
2020	Not held	
