= Autódromo Eduardo Prudêncio Cabrera =

Motorsport racetrack in Uruguay

Autodromo Eduardo Prudêncio Cabrera
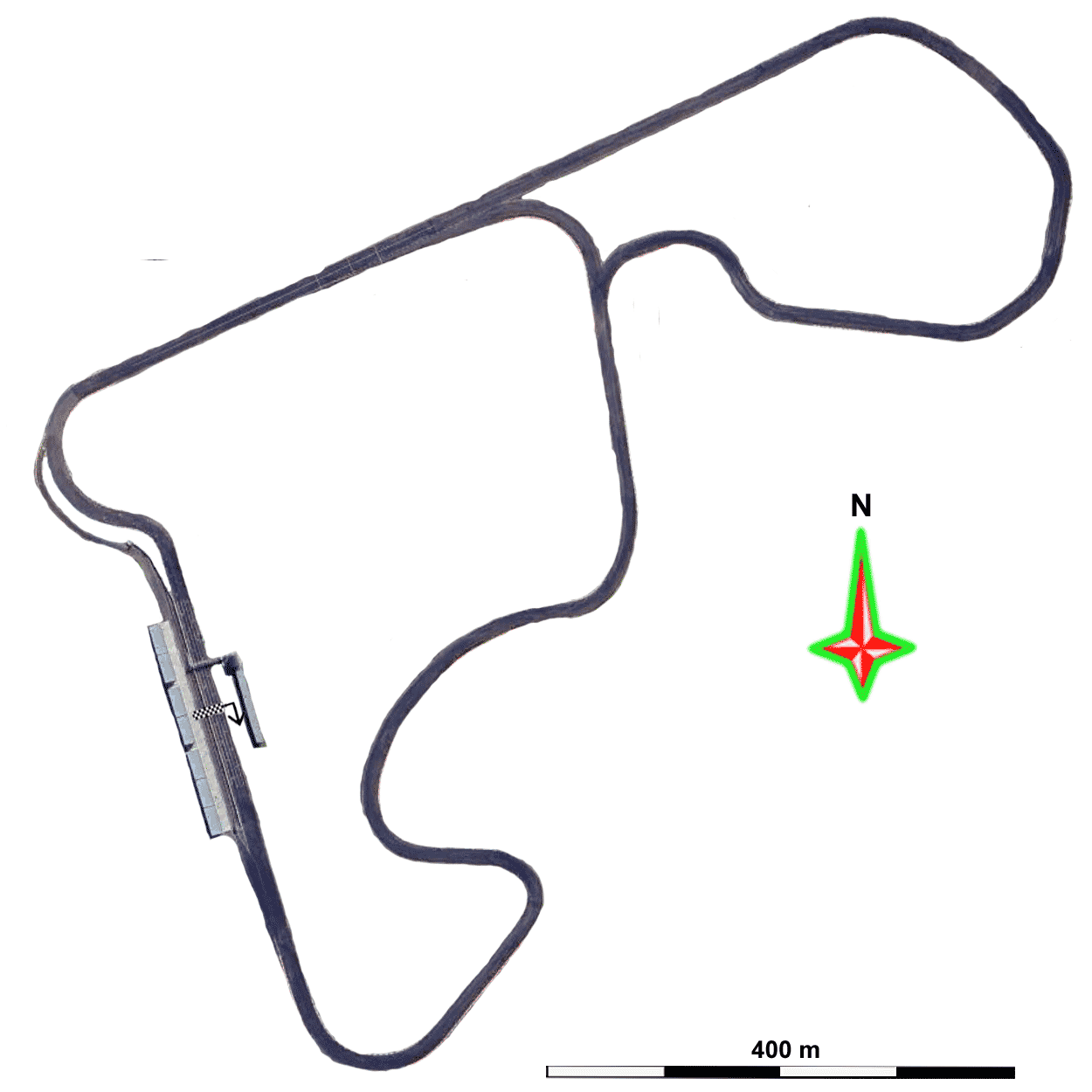
- Full Circuit (2013–present)
- Location: Rivera, Uruguay
- Coordinates: 30°51′46.36″S 55°36′23.77″W
- Opened: September 1951; 75 years ago Re-opened: November 2013; 12 years ago
- Closed: End of 1990s
- Former names: Autódromo de Rivera
- Major events: Current: Fórmula Truck (2017, 2022–present); Former: TCR South America (2021–2023); TCR Brazil (2023); GT Sprint Race (2018–2019); Copa Truck (2018–2019); Formula 4 Sudamericana (2016)

Full Circuit (2013–present)
- Length: 3.080 km (1.914 mi)
- Turns: 15
- Race lap record: 1:16.993 ( (Uruguay) Facundo Ferra, Signatech FR 1.6, 2016, Formula Renault 1.6)

Short Circuit (2013–present)
- Length: 2.100 km (1.305 mi)
- Turns: 9

Full Circuit (1962–1990s)
- Length: 2.329 km (1.447 mi)
- Turns: 7

Original Circuit (1951–1990s)
- Length: 1.242 km (0.772 mi)
- Turns: 5

Autodromo Eduardo Prudêncio Cabrera is a 3.080 km (1.914 mi) motor racing circuit in Rivera. It was inaugurated in September 1951. However, it was abandoned at the end of the 1990s. In 2012, the circuit was rebuilt again and it was reopened in November 2013. The circuit currently hosts Fórmula Truck, and national championships. However, it also hosted TCR South America Touring Car Championship and some other Brazilian motorsport championships, such as GT Sprint Race and Copa Truck due to its proximity to the Brazilian border.

== Lap records ==
As of July 2023, the fastest official race lap records at the Autódromo Eduardo Prudêncio Cabrera are listed as:

Category	Time	Driver	Vehicle	Event
Full Circuit (2013–present): 3.080 km (1.914 mi)
Formula Renault 1.6	1:16.993	Facundo Ferra	Signatech FR 1.6	2016 Rivera F4 Sudamericana round
TCR Touring Car	1:18.439	Juan Manuel Casella	Honda Civic Type R TCR (FK8)	2023 Rivera TCR South America round
Truck racing	1:33.968	Beto Monteiro	Volkswagen Truck	2019 Rivera Copa Truck round
