= TCR South America Touring Car Championship =

Touring car series based in South America

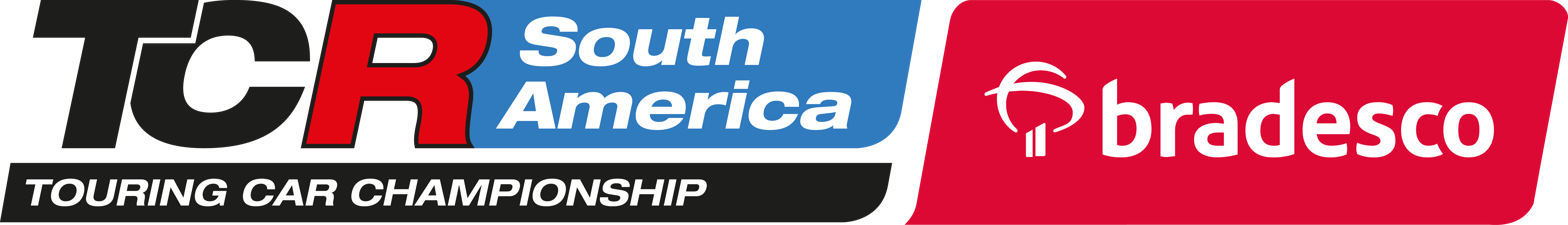
- Category: Touring cars
- Country: Argentina; Brazil; Chile; Uruguay
- Inaugural season: 2021
- Drivers: 24
- Teams: 7
- Constructors: 6
- Tyre suppliers: (South Korea) Kumho Tire
- Drivers' champion: (Argentina) Leonel Pernía
- Teams' champion: (Argentina) Honda YPF Racing
- Official website: https://southamerica.tcr-series.com/

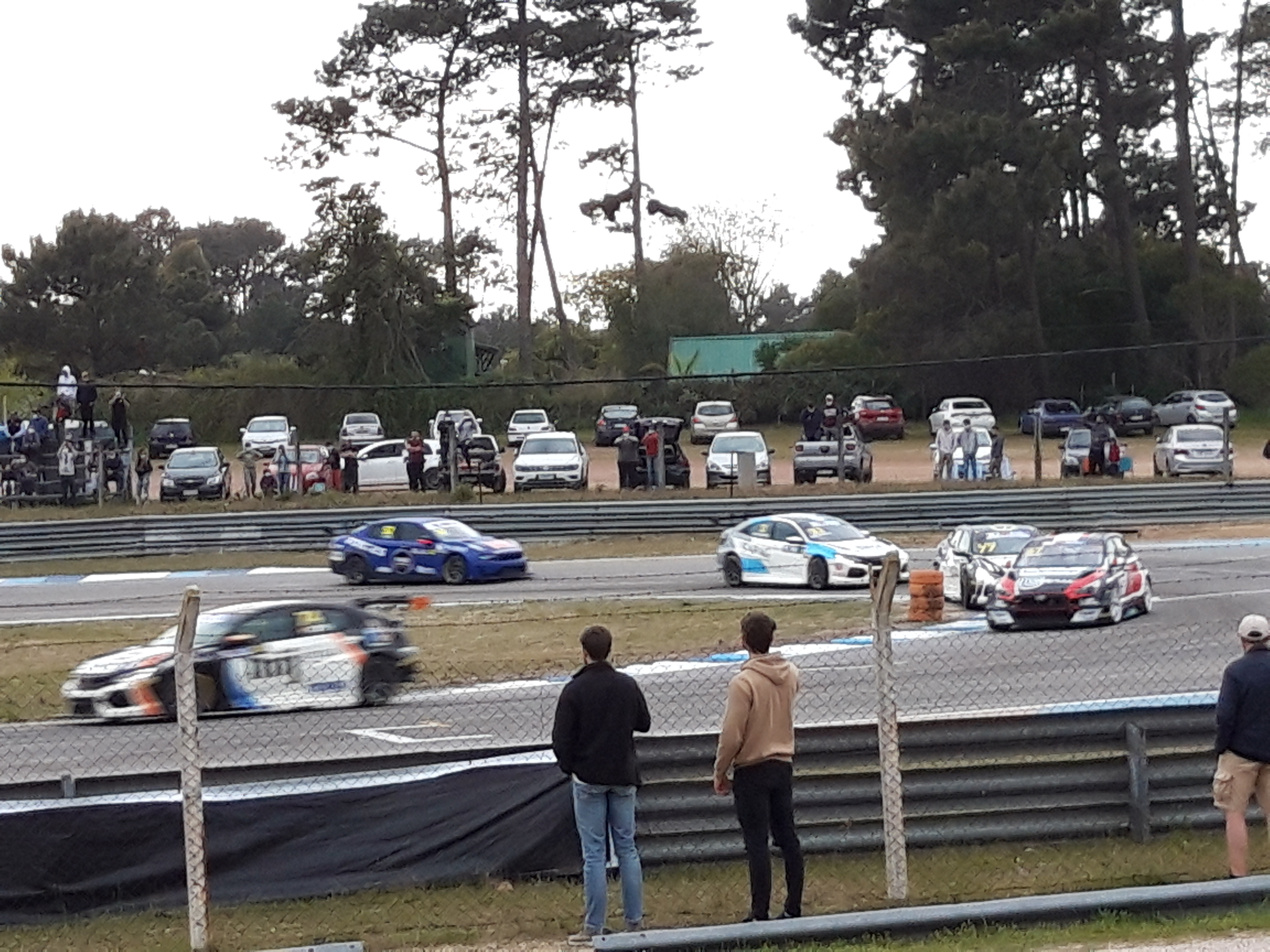
2021 TCR South America race at El Pinar

The TCR South America Touring Car Championship (due to sponsorship reasons, officially known as the Bradesco TCR South America Touring Car Championship, short TCR SA) is a touring car racing series based in South America first held in 2021, which uses the TCR Touring Car regulations.

== Background ==
The creation of a South American-based TCR championship was announced on 4 March 2020. At the announcement, racing driver Néstor Girolami welcomed the initiative, stating that he believed the timing was appropriate for South America to establish its own TCR series. He also said that the championship could provide a pathway for young drivers to progress to higher levels of touring car racing, including the World Touring Car Cup (WTCR), and noted that, as a Honda driver, he hoped to compete in the series and represent the manufacturer in the region.

The championship is headed by Felipe McGough, who was previously involved with the South American Super Touring Car Championship, and Maurizio Slaviero, former president of Stock Car Brasil. Victor Rosso, director of the Honda Racing Super TC2000 team, serves as sporting director, while race engineer Samuel Canca Ruiz is the championship's technical director.

The championship director is Felipe McGough, formerly of the South American Supertouring Car Championship, and Maurizio Slaviero, formerly the president of Stock Car Brazil. The sporting director is Víctor Rosso, the director of the Argentine RAM Racing Factory team, and the technical director is Samuel Canca Ruiz, a race engineer.

The TCR is a touring car homologation system, first introduced in 2014 and now used by a multitude of championships worldwide.

=== TCR Brazil ===
Announced in 2020, TCR South America held its first season the following year. Since then, the series has alternated races in Argentina, Uruguay, and Brazil. During this period, the grid has expanded, reaching 21 cars in 2023.

With its inaugural six-round schedule coinciding with the third edition of TCR South America, the national TCR Brazil championship, led by Mauricio Slaviero, the executive who headed Stock Car, began in 2023. It took years before it headed to Europe with the mission of developing the world's first all-electric touring car class, the ETCR.

TCR Brazil promises to consolidate the success of TCR South America, whose evolution from the first season to the current one is evident. The "Liberators of the Americas of asphalt" has unveiled a 19-car grid in 2022, with seven different manufacturers represented. The media package is attractive, with races broadcast live on Disney Channels throughout the region, in addition to regular coverage on major motorsports portals.

The competition promises even more in the coming months, as Toyota is in the final stages of developing its Corolla TCR. Toyota Gazoo Racing of Argentina is leading the development of the model, which will be able to compete on all TCR event tracks around the world.

== Circuits ==
The championship consists of circuits in Argentina, Brazil, and Uruguay:

- **Bold** denotes a circuit is used in the 2026 season.

Number	Circuits	Rounds	Years
1	(Brazil) **Autódromo José Carlos Pace**	7 (Note: Interlagos Circuit hosted 2 rounds in 2024.)	2021–present
2	(Uruguay) **Autódromo Víctor Borrat Fabini**	6	2021–present
3	(Brazil) **Autódromo Velo Città**	5	2022–present
4	(Argentina) Autódromo Termas de Río Hondo	4	2022–2025
4	(Argentina) **Autódromo Municipal Juan Manuel Fangio**	4	2023–present
6	(Uruguay) Autódromo Eduardo Prudêncio Cabrera	3	2021–2023
6	(Argentina) Autódromo Oscar y Juan Gálvez	3	2021–2022, 2024
6	(Argentina) **Autódromo Oscar Cabalén**	3	2021, 2023, 2026
6	(Argentina) Circuito San Juan Villicum	3	2022, 2024–2025
6	(Brazil) **Autódromo Internacional de Cascavel**	3	2023–2024, 2026
11	(Uruguay) Polideportivo Ciudad de Mercedes	2	2024–2025
11	(Brazil) **Circuito dos Cristais**	2	2025–present
11	(Brazil) **Autódromo Internacional de Mato Grosso**	2	2025–present
14	(Brazil) Autódromo Internacional de Curitiba	1	2021
14	(Argentina) Autódromo Parque Ciudad de Río Cuarto	1	2021
14	(Argentina) Autódromo de Concepción del Uruguay	1	2021
14	(Brazil) Autódromo Internacional Ayrton Senna (Goiânia)	1	2022
14	(Argentina) Autódromo José Carlos Bassi	1	2023
14	(Brazil) Velopark	1	2023
14	(Argentina) Autódromo Ciudad de Oberá	1	2025
14	(Argentina) **Autódromo Ciudad de Concordia**	1	2026
14	(Argentina) **Autódromo Rosamonte**	1	2026

== Champions ==
Drivers' Champions				Teams' Champions		Info
Year	Driver	Team	Car	Team	Car	#
2021	(Spain) Pepe Oriola	(Brazil) W2 ProGP	Honda Civic Type R TCR (FK8)	(Brazil) W2 ProGP	Honda Civic Type R TCR (FK8)	
2022	(Argentina) Fabricio Pezzini	(Argentina) PMO Motorsport	Lynk & Co 03 TCR	(Argentina) PMO Motorsport	Lynk & Co 03 TCR	
2023	(Argentina) Ignacio Montenegro	(Argentina) Squadra Martino	Honda Civic Type R TCR (FK8)	(Argentina) Squadra Martino	Honda Civic Type R TCR (FK8)	
2024	(Brazil) Pedro Cardoso	(Brazil) BRB by PMO Racing	Peugeot 308 TCR	(Argentina) PMO Racing	Peugeot 308 TCR	
2025	(Argentina) Leonel Pernía	(Argentina) Honda YPF Racing	Honda Civic Type R TCR (FK8)	(Argentina) Honda YPF Racing	Honda Civic Type R TCR (FK8)	
2026						

== Television coverage ==
The Races of the TCR South America are broadcast on Cable Television including: ESPN, Fox Sports, Movistar+, CBS Sports y NBC Sports.

=== Coverage in Brazil ===
Transmission
BandSports	Narration: Márcio Pozzan
BandSports	Narration: Eduardo Veríssimo
BandSports	Comments: Duda Pompermayer
BandSports	Comments: Rafael Pasqualotto

Transmission
YouTube	Narration: Alexandre Eiras
YouTube	Narration: Thiago Fabris
YouTube	Comments: Ivar Castagnetti
YouTube	Comments: Henrique Gava

=== Other countries ===
- Colombia: RCN Televisión y RCN HD2
- Portugal: Sport TV
- (United Kingdom) Reino Unido: BT Sport
- (Canada) Canadá: Sportsnet
- (Spain) España: Movistar+
- (Mercosur) Hispanoamérica: ESPN y Star+
- Italy: Parc Fermé TV on YouTube
- Germany: Motorsport Television Deutschland on YouTube

=== Streaming links ===
Internet (Global)
YouTube
Motorsport.tv
Facebook
Zoome
Catve.com
Auto Videos
Twitch

== Rule sets ==
The series uses the TCR Touring Car regulations. All TCR touring cars are front-wheel drive cars based on 4- or 5-door production vehicles and powered by 1.75- to 2.0-liter turbocharged engines. While the TCR vehicle's body and suspension design are carried over from the production car, and many models use a production gearbox, certain adaptations are made for track requirements, including upgraded brakes and aerodynamics. Competition vehicles are subject to Balance of Performance (BoP) adjustments to ensure competitiveness among different vehicles.

== See also ==
- List of TCR Series
- TCR Brazil Touring Car Championship
- Stock Car Pro Series
