= Autódromo Santiago Yaco Guarnieri =

- Full Circuit (1979–present)
- Location: Resistencia, Chaco, Argentina
- Coordinates: 27°23′17″S 59°0′18″W
- Opened: 24 June 1979; 47 years ago
- Former names: Autódromo Regional del Nordeste
- Major events: Former: Formula 4 Sudamericana (2015); TC2000 (1980, 1984–1986, 1993, 1995, 2001–2003, 2006, 2008–2011, 2014); Top Race V6 (2004, 2010–2011, 2013–2017, 2022); F3 Sudamericana (1993, 1997); SASTC (1997)

Full Circuit (1979–present)
- Length: 2.695 km (1.675 mi)
- Turns: 8
- Race lap record: 0:59.550 ( (Argentina) Gabriel Furlán, Dallara F390, 1993, F3)

Autódromo Santiago Yaco Guarnieri is a 2.695 km (1.675 mi) motorsports circuit located in Chaco, Argentina. It has hosted events in the TC 2000 and Formula Renault series. The track is located on low ground, and can be flooded very easily. On rainy days the circuit facilities can be under water, preventing the normal development of activities.

== Lap records ==
As of April 2017, the fastest official race lap records at the Autódromo Santiago Yaco Guarnieri are listed as:

Category	Time	Driver	Vehicle	Event
Full Circuit (1979–present): 2.695 km (1.675 mi)
Formula Three	0:59.550	Gabriel Furlán	Dallara F390	1993 Resistencia F3 Sudamericana round
Formula Renault 2.0	1:02.601	Franco Vivian	Tito F4-A	2010 Resistencia Formula Renault Argentina round
TC2000	1:02.956	Matías Rossi	Toyota Corolla Mk.10	2011 Resistencia TC2000 round
Formula Renault 1.6	1:04.029	Pedro Cardoso	Signatech FR 1.6	2015 Resistencia F4 Sudamericana round
Top Race V6	1:05.304	Matías Rossi	Toyota Camry XV50	2017 Resistencia Top Race V6 round
Super Touring	1:06.637	Oscar Larrauri	BMW 318is	1997 Resistencia SASTC round
