= Polideportivo Ciudad de Mercedes =

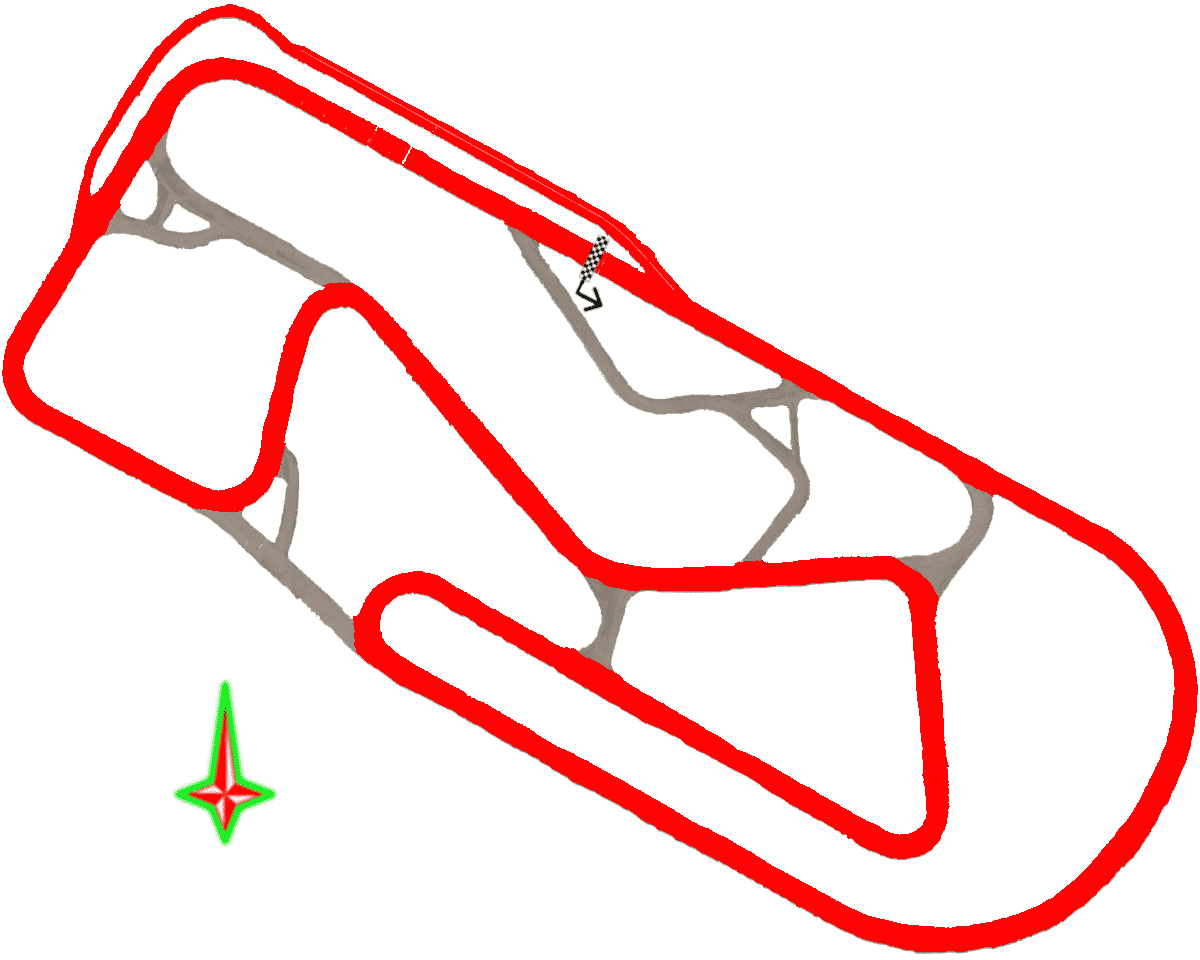
- Full Circuit (2010–present)
- Location: Mercedes, Soriano, Uruguay
- Coordinates: 33°15′0.7″S 58°4′45.5″W
- Owner: Soriano Department
- Broke ground: 2009
- Opened: 15 April 2010; 16 years ago
- Major events: Former: TCR South America (2024–2025); TC2000 (2025); Formula 4 Sudamericana (2014–2016); TC2000 Series (2014–2015)

Full Circuit (2010–present)
- Length: 2.970 km (1.845 mi)
- Turns: 10
- Race lap record: 1:17.533 ( (Argentina) Leonel Pernía, Honda Civic Type R TCR (FL5), 2025, TCR)

Polideportivo Ciudad de Mercedes is a 2.970 km (1.845 mi) motorsports circuit located 5 km (3.1 mi) west of Mercedes, Uruguay. The circuit was opened on 2010, and renovated in 2023. The circuit hosts mainly national events of AUVO, however it also hosted Formula 4 Sudamericana and TC2000 Series events before. On 29 February 2024, it was announced that the circuit would host the 6th round of 2024 TCR South America season to commemorate the 400th anniversary of the founding of the nearby Villa Soriano town.

== Lap records ==
As of November 2025, the fastest official race lap records at the Polideportivo Ciudad de Mercedes are listed as:

Category	Time	Driver	Vehicle	Event
Full Circuit (2010–present): 2.970 km (1.845 mi)
TCR Touring Car	1:17.533	Leonel Pernía	Honda Civic Type R TCR (FL5)	2025 Mercedes TCR South America round
TC2000	1:19.060	Franco Morillo	Chevrolet Cruze	2025 Mercedes TC2000 round
Formula Renault 1.6	1:21.108	Juan Manuel Casella	Signatech FR 1.6	2016 1st Mercedes F4 Sudamericana round
TC2000 Series	1:23.601	Augusto Scalbi	Renault Fluence	2015 Mercedes TC2000 Series round
