= Autódromo Víctor Borrat Fabini =

Motorsport racetrack in Uruguay

Autodromo Víctor Borrat Fabini
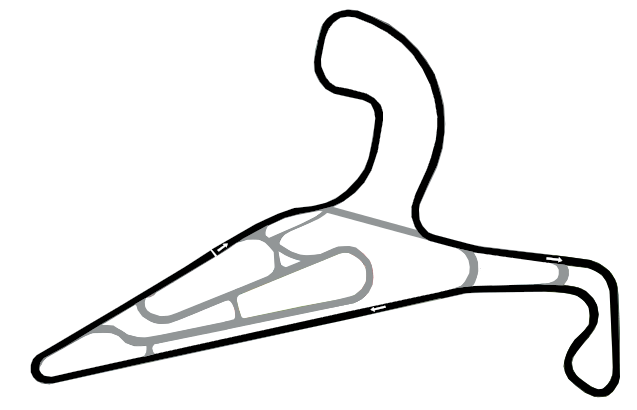
- Perimeter No.12 Circuit (2023–present)
- Location: El Pinar, Canelones Department, Uruguay
- Coordinates: 34°46′50″S 55°55′20″W
- FIA Grade: 4 (Note: Autódromo Víctor Borrat Fabini's Grade 4 licence expired 30 January 2025.)
- Operator: Asociación Uruguaya de Volantes
- Opened: 14 October 1956; 69 years ago
- Major events: Current: TCR South America (2021–present); Former: TCR World Tour (2023–2024); Stock Car Pro Series (2024); Fórmula Academy Sudamericana (2014–2016, 2018–2019); F3 Sudamericana (1988–1989, 1994); SASTC (1999); TC2000 (1981–1982); Turismo Nacional (1968, 1982); Turismo Carretera (1968); 6 Hours of El Pinar (1957–1968, 1972, 1975, 1977–1981)

Perimeter No.12 Circuit (2023–present)
- Length: 3.120 km (1.939 mi)
- Turns: 12
- Race lap record: 1:18.544 ( (Brazil) Enzo Elias, Toyota Corolla Stock Car, 2024, Stock Car Pro)

No.1 Circuit (2017–present)
- Length: 3.520 km (2.187 mi)
- Turns: 14
- Race lap record: 1:40.793 ( (Uruguay) Facundo Ferra, Signatech FR 1.6, 2018, Formula Renault 1.6)

No.8 Circuit (2017–present)
- Length: 2.660 km (1.653 mi)
- Turns: 9
- Race lap record: 1:10.757 ( (Argentina) José Manuel Sapag, Lynk & Co 03 TCR, 2022, TCR)

No.2 Circuit (2017–present)
- Length: 3.240 km (2.013 mi)
- Turns: 13
- Race lap record: 1:32.022 ( (Brazil) Rodrigo Baptista, Audi RS 3 LMS TCR, 2021, TCR)

No.3 Circuit with "Beco" Corner (1999–2016)
- Length: 2.680 km (1.665 mi)
- Turns: 7
- Race lap record: 1:09.862 ( (Uruguay) Facundo Garese, Signatech FR 1.6, 2016, Formula Renault 1.6)

No.3 Circuit with "Gota de Agua" Corner (1975–1998)
- Length: 3.002 km (1.865 mi)
- Turns: 8
- Race lap record: 1:10.870 ( (Brazil) Leonel Friedrich, Reynard 883, 1989, F3)

Original No.1 Circuit (1956–1998, 2017–present)
- Turns: 4

Autodromo Víctor Borrat Fabini is a motor racing circuit in El Pinar, Uruguay, located 31 km (19 mi) from Montevideo. It was inaugurated on 14 October 1956. The circuit features various layout configurations. The circuit currently hosts TCR World Tour, TCR South America Touring Car Championship and national championships, however it also hosted some other continental championships and Argentinian motorsport championships in the past. In 1999, "Gota de Agua" corner was discontinued, and "Beco" corner was built in the inner side of circuit. In 2017, the circuit was extended and discontinued "Gota de Agua" corner section was reasphalted.

Besides hosting some continental and national championships, it was also announced that the circuit would host its first intercontinental event TCR World Tour in 18–20 August 2023. For this event, the circuit was renovated and the layout was extended approximately 0.500 km (0.311 mi).

== Layout configurations ==
Autódromo Víctor Borrat Fabini layout configurations
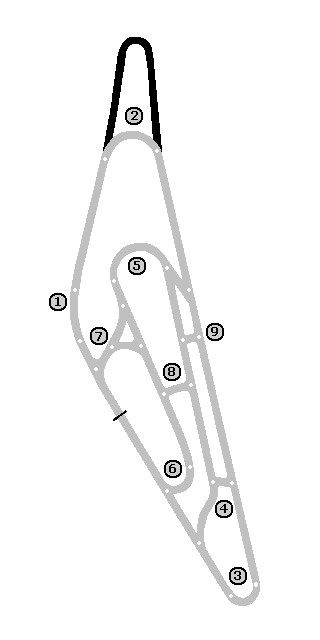
All Layout Configurations before the 2017 extension

No.3 Circuit with "Beco" Corner (1999–2016)

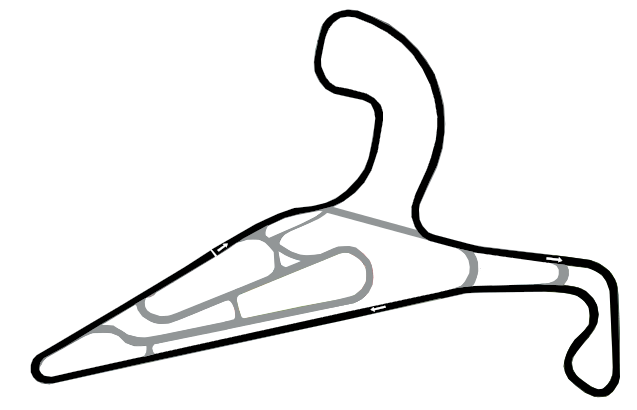
Perimeter No.12 Circuit (2023–present)

== Lap records ==
As of July 2025, the fastest official race lap records at the Autódromo Víctor Borrat Fabini are listed as:

Category	Time	Driver	Vehicle	Event
Perimeter No.12 Circuit (2023–present): 3.120 km (1.939 mi)
Stock Car Pro	1:18.544	Enzo Elias	Toyota Corolla Stock Car	2024 El Pinar Stock Car Pro round
TCR Touring Car	1:20.475	Nelson Piquet Jr.	Honda Civic Type R TCR (FL5)	2025 El Pinar TCR South America round
No.1 Circuit (2017–present): 3.520 km (2.187 mi)
Formula Renault 1.6	1:40.793	Facundo Ferra	Signatech FR 1.6	2018 El Pinar Formula Academy Sudamericana round
No.8 Circuit (2017–present): 2.660 km (1.653 mi)
TCR Touring Car	1:10.757	José Manuel Sapag	Lynk & Co 03 TCR	2022 El Pinar TCR South America round
No.2 Circuit (2017–present): 3.240 km (2.013 mi)
TCR Touring Car	1:32.022	Rodrigo Baptista	Audi RS 3 LMS TCR	2021 El Pinar TCR South America round
No.3 Circuit with "Beco" Corner (1999–2016): 2.680 km (1.665 mi)
Formula Renault 1.6	1:09.862	Facundo Garese	Signatech FR 1.6	2016 2nd El Pinar F4 Sudamericana round
Super Touring	1:11.898	Oscar Fineschi	Chrysler Stratus	1999 1st El Pinar SASTC round
No.2 Circuit with "Beco" Corner (1999–2016): 2.120 km (1.317 mi)
Formula Renault 1.6	0:59.621	Juan Manuel Casella	Signatech FR 1.6	2014 1st El Pinar F4 Sudamericana round
No.5 Circuit with "Beco" Corner (1999–2016): 2.100 km (1.305 mi)
Formula Renault 1.6	0:54.596	Juan Manuel Casella	Signatech FR 1.6	2014 3rd El Pinar F4 Sudamericana round
No.6 Circuit with "Beco" Corner (1999–2016): 2.100 km (1.305 mi)
Formula Renault 1.6	0:58.570	Agustín Cejas	Signatech FR 1.6	2016 5th El Pinar F4 Sudamericana round
No.7 Circuit with "Beco" Corner (1999–2016): 2.120 km (1.317 mi)
Formula Renault 1.6	1:06.687	Miguel Wohler	Signatech FR 1.6	2014 2nd El Pinar F4 Sudamericana round
No.3 Circuit with "Gota de Agua" Corner (1975–1998): 3.002 km (1.865 mi)
Formula Three	1:10.870	Leonel Friedrich	Reynard 883	1989 El Pinar F3 Sudamericana round
