= El Pinar, Uruguay =

El Pinar
- Resort of Ciudad de la Costa
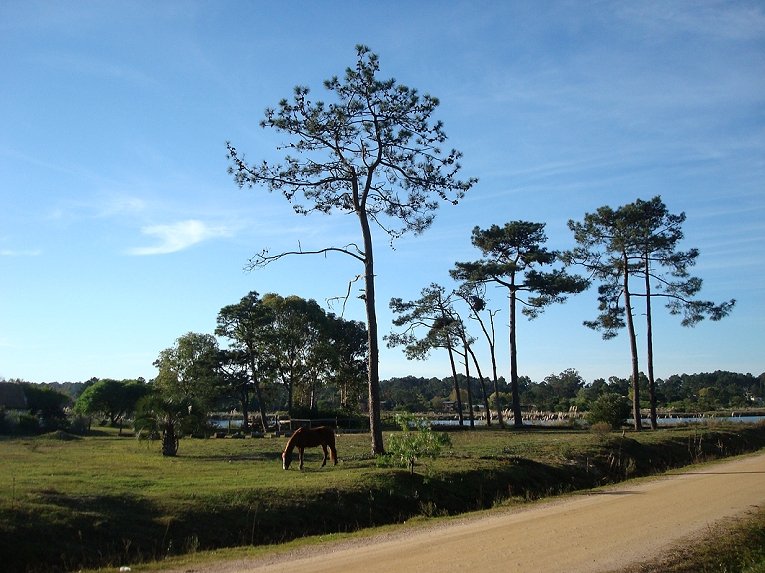
- East end of El Pinar at Arroyo Pando.

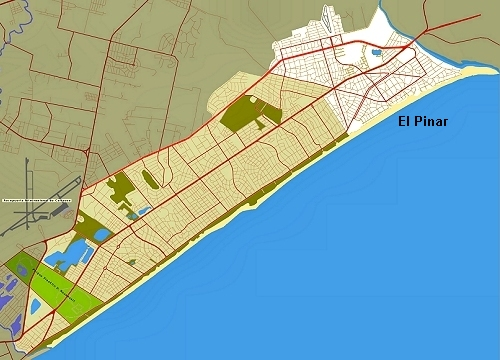
- Location of El Pinar in Ciudad de la Costa
- Coordinates: 34°47′50″S 55°54′35″W
- Country: Uruguay
- Department: Canelones Department

Population (2011)
  - Total: 21,091
- Time zone: UTC -3
- Postal code: 15800
- Dial plan: +598 2698 (+4 digits)

El Pinar is a seaside resort of the Canelones Department, Uruguay. In 1994, when Ciudad de la Costa took on the status of a city, El Pinar was incorporated in it.

== Geography ==
El Pinar is the easternmost locality of Ciudad de la Costa, after which starts the group of resorts known as Costa de Oro. Its south limit is the coastline of the Río de la Plata and it shares borders with Lomas de Solymar to the west, with Neptunia to the east, with the stream Arroyo Pando separating the two, and with Country Villa Juana to the north.

== Places of worship ==
- St. Rose of Lima Parish Church (Roman Catholic, Dehonians)

== Population ==
In 2011 El Pinar had a population of 21,091.

Year	Population
1963	394
1975	1,874
1985	3,479
1996	10,383
2004	17,221
2011	21,091

Source: Instituto Nacional de Estadística de Uruguay

== Street map ==
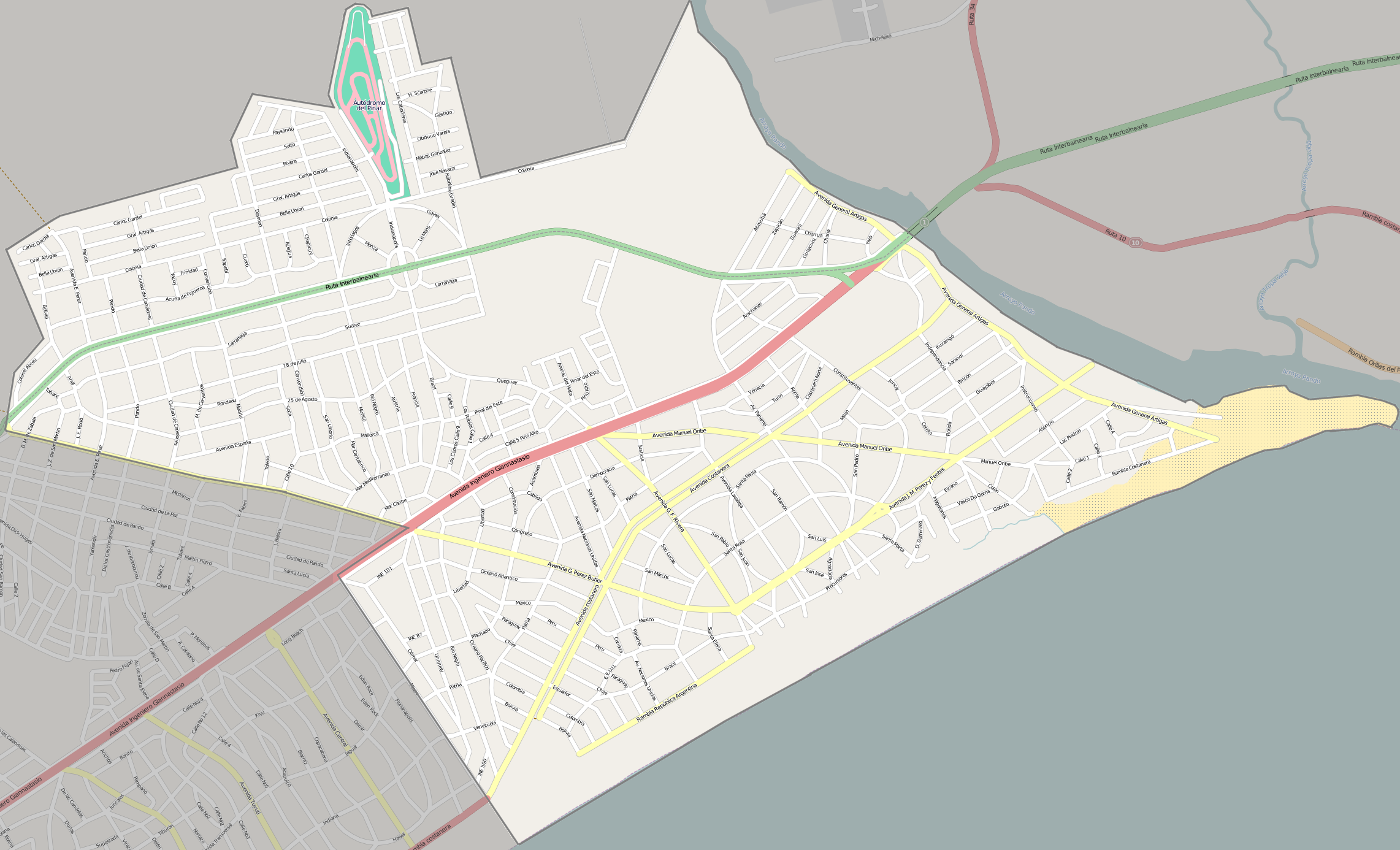
Street map of El Pinar
