= MAN SE =

German mechanical engineering company

- Type: Public (Societas Europaea)
- Industry: Manufacturing, automotive industry, marine engineering
- Founded: 1758; 268 years ago
- Defunct: 31 August 2021; 5 years ago
- Fate: Merged into Traton
- Headquarters: Munich, Germany
- Products: Diesel and other engines, turbomachinery
- Revenue: €13.6 billion (2016)
- Number of employees: 53,824 (end 2016)

MAN SE (abbreviation of Maschinenfabrik Augsburg-Nürnberg, German: [maˈʃiːnənfaˌbʁiːk ˈʔaʊksbʊʁk ˈnʏʁnbɛʁk]) was a manufacturing and engineering company based in Munich, Germany. Its primary output was commercial vehicles and diesel engines through its MAN Truck & Bus and MAN Latin America divisions, and participation in the manufacturer Sinotruk.

MAN SE was majority-owned by Traton, the heavy commercial vehicle subsidiary of automaker Volkswagen AG, until August 2021 when Traton completed a squeeze-out of all remaining shareholders and formally merged MAN SE into Traton SE, meaning the former subsidiaries of MAN SE were now directly owned by Traton, and MAN SE ceased to exist.

== History ==
The original logo included dots between the letters (M·A·N)

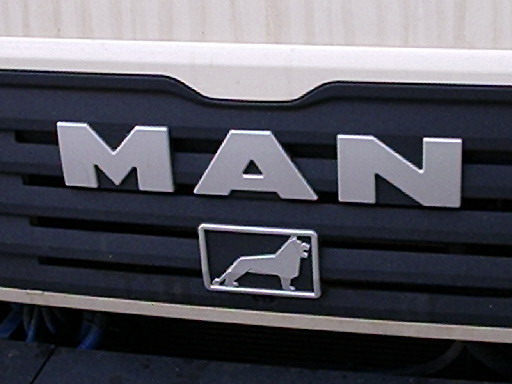
This logo is on the front of all MAN trucks and buses. The lion comes from Büssing AG, a company that MAN acquired in 1971. It resembles the coat of arms of the city of Brunswick.

=== Foundation ===
MAN traces its origins back to 1758, when the "St. Anthony" ironworks commenced operation in Oberhausen, as the first heavy-industry enterprise in the Ruhr region. In 1808, the three ironworks "St. Anthony", Gute Hoffnung (lit. 'Good Hope'), and Neue Essen (lit. 'New Forge') merged, to form the Hüttengewerkschaft und Handlung Jacobi (lit. 'Jacobi Iron and Steel Works Union and Trading Company'), Oberhausen, which was later renamed Gutehoffnungshütte (GHH).

In 1840, German engineer Ludwig Sander founded in Augsburg the first predecessor enterprise of MAN in Southern Germany, namely the Sander'sche Maschinenfabrik. It firstly became the C. A. Reichenbach'sche Maschinenfabrik, which was named after the pioneer of printing machines Carl August Reichenbach, and later on the Maschinenfabrik Augsburg. The branch Süddeutsche Brückenbau A.G. (MAN-Werk Gustavsburg) was founded when the company in 1859 was awarded the contract for the construction of the railway bridge over the Rhine at Mainz.

In 1898, the companies Maschinenbau-AG Nürnberg (founded 1841) and Maschinenfabrik Augsburg AG (founded 1840) merged to form Vereinigte Maschinenfabrik Augsburg und Maschinenbaugesellschaft Nürnberg A.G., Augsburg ("United Machine Factory Augsburg and Machine Building Company Nuremberg Ltd, Augsburg"). In 1908, the company was renamed Maschinenfabrik Augsburg Nürnberg AG, or in short, M·A·N.

While the focus initially remained on ore mining and iron production in the Ruhr region, mechanical engineering became the dominating branch of business in Augsburg and Nuremberg. Under the direction of Heinrich von Buz, Maschinenfabrik Augsburg grew from a medium-sized business of 400 employees into a major enterprise with a workforce of 12,000 by 1913.

Locomotion, propulsion, and steel building were the big components of this phase. The early predecessors of MAN were responsible for numerous technological innovations. The success of the early MAN entrepreneurs and engineers such as Heinrich Gerber, was based on a great openness towards new technologies. They constructed the Wuppertal monorail ("Wuppertaler Schwebebahn") and the first spectacular steel bridges such as the Großhesseloher Brücke in Munich in 1857 and the Müngsten railway bridge between 1893 and 1897. Between 1893 and 1897, Rudolf Diesel also worked with future MAN engineers in a laboratory in Augsburg to complete his first diesel engine.

During 1921, the majority of MAN was taken over by the Gutehoffnungshütte Actienverein für Bergbau und Hüttenbetrieb, Sterkrade (GHH), (founded 1873). Through well-directed equities and acquisitions of processing industries, e.g., Deutsche Werft (1918), Ferrostaal (1921), Deggendorfer Werft und Eisenbau (1924), MAN advanced to a nationwide operating enterprise, with a workforce of 52,000 by 1921. MAN also produced tractors by the name MAN Ackerdiesel (1938-1962). The decision for tractor production was made due to increasing demand from eastern Germany.

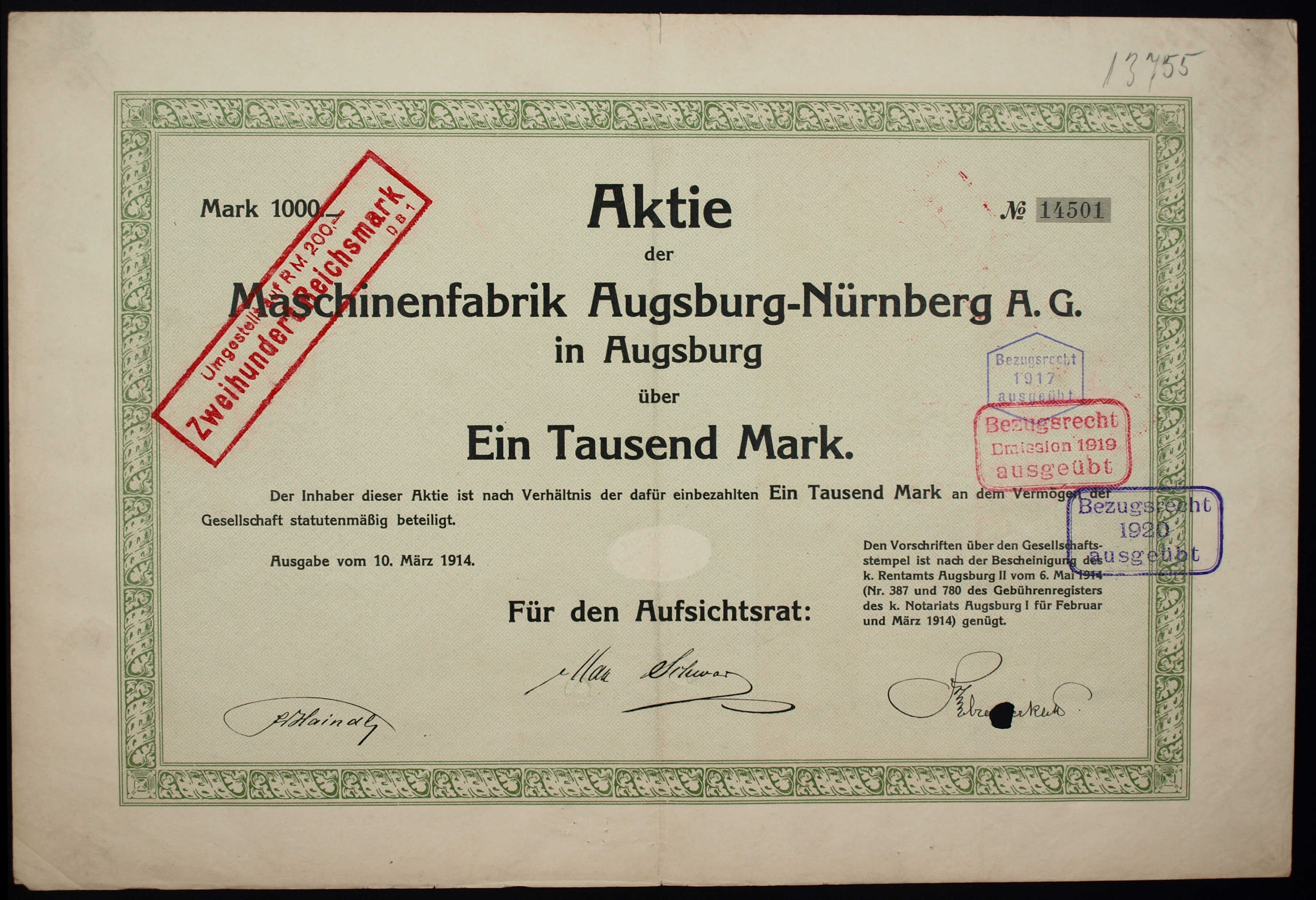
Share of the Maschinenfabrik Augsburg-Nürnberg AG, issued 10 March 1914

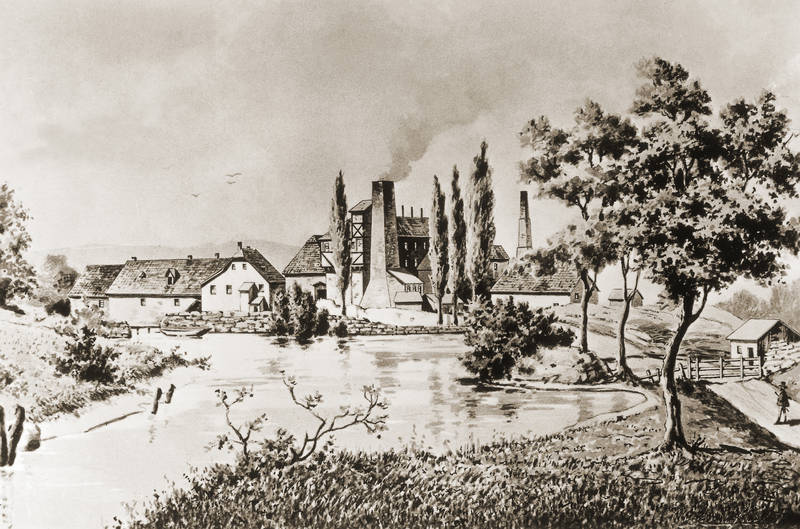
St. Antony

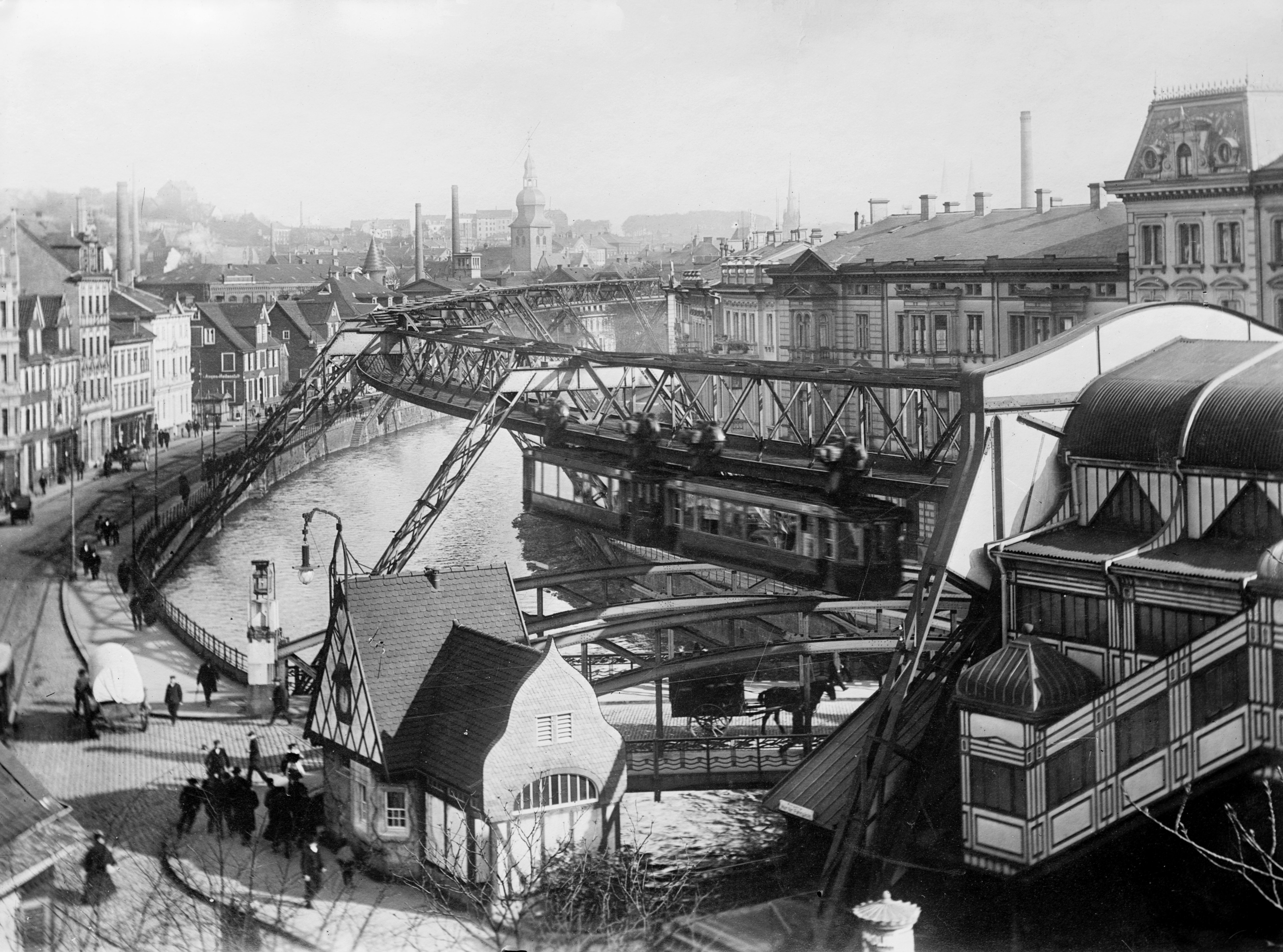
Suspension railway in Wuppertal, Germany, construction MAN-Werk Gustavsburg

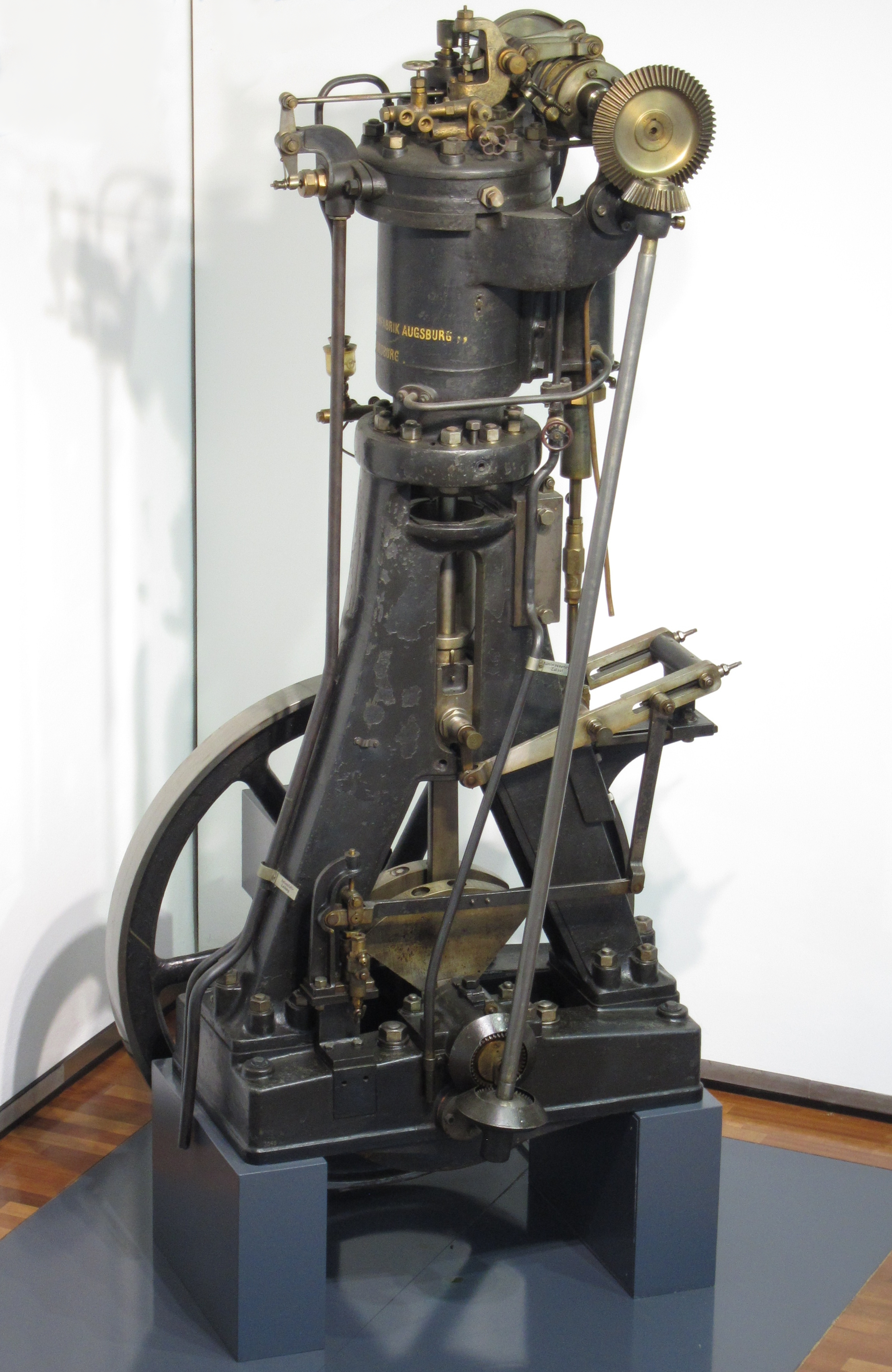
Rudolf Diesel's first engine

=== Crisis and World War II ===
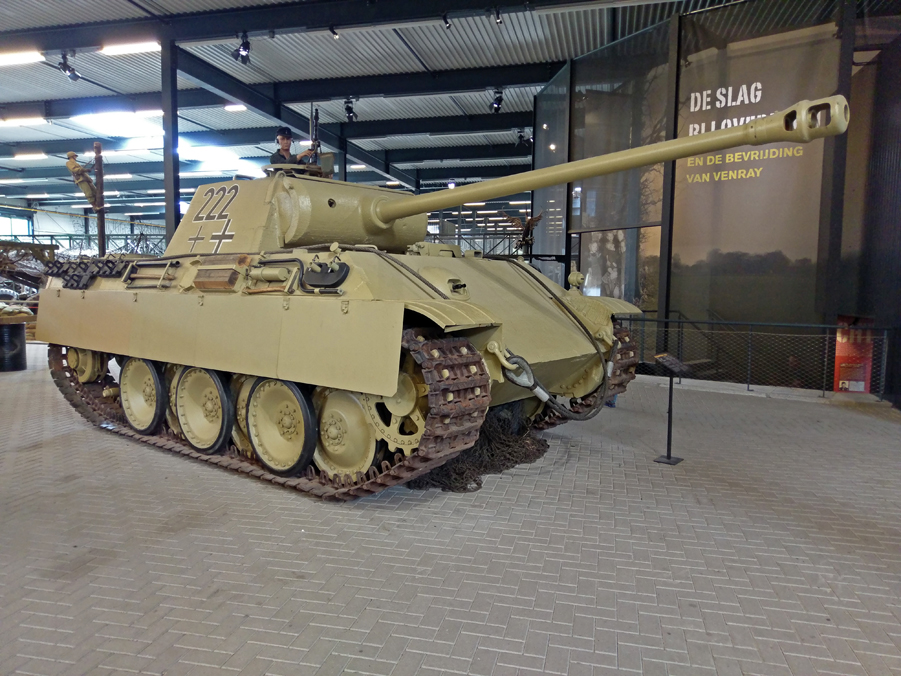
Panzer V "Panther"

At the same time, the GHH's economic situation worsened. The causes for this were, among others, the reparations after World War I, the French occupation of the Ruhr region and the world economic crisis. In only two years, the number of MAN employees sank from 14,000 in 1929/30 to 7,400 in 1931/32. While the civil business was largely collapsing, the military business increased with the armament under the National Socialist regime. GHH/MAN enterprises supplied finished tanks, diesel engines for submarines and surface craft, and cylinders for projectiles and artillery of every description. Although MAN produced experimental diesel engines for tanks (Panzers), Maybach enjoyed a de facto monopoly on the design and manufacture of all tank and half-track engines, which were water-cooled, four-stroke gasoline motors. No diesel engines were installed in production armoured fighting vehicles during the war. MAN also produced gun parts, including Mauser Karabiner 98k rifle bolts. MAN's Waffenamt code was WaA53, and ordnance code was "coc".

The MAN works in Augsburg, which produced diesel engines for U-boats and surface craft, and the MAN works in Nuremberg, which built 40% of Germany's Panther tanks, were often the target of massive Allied bombing attacks during World War II.

=== Postwar period ===
After the end of World War II, the allies split up the GHH group. A vertical integration, in which mining, iron, and steel production are consolidated, was not allowed anymore. The "Gutehoffnungshütte", together with the MAN firms of Southern Germany, therefore concentrated on engineering, plant construction, commercial vehicles, and printing machines. This process has been supported by strategic acquisitions and dispositions; one of the most important was the take-over of the truck and bus division of the commercial vehicles manufacturer Büssing (1971), the disposition of the shares of the shipyard Deutsche Werft (1966/67), and the acquisition of the printing machine producer Faber&Schleicher, as well as its fusion to MAN Roland Druckmaschinen AG (1979).

In 1980, MAN took control of Burmeister & Wain, the Danish company that had been a world leader in design and construction of large diesel engines for large ships.

In 1982/83, the "Gutehoffnungshütte" plunged into a deep corporate crisis. The enterprise suffered from the late effects of the second oil crisis and a bad economic situation. This was particularly displayed by the dramatic downturn of the commercial vehicle sales figures. Besides external factors, the chief course of these problems was the obsolete company structure with extensive cross-subsidisation between the divisions. At this time, the former director of GHH presented a reclamation concept that envisioned a complete consolidation of the subsidiary with the holding company. This concept encountered great resistance with GHH's major shareholders Allianz AG and Commerzbank. The media speculated about a "Bavarian conspiracy" against the management in Oberhausen.

In 1986, with Klaus Götte, the group got a new company structure and became a contractual group with an economically independent division at several locations. This was also attended by the transferring of the MAN headquarters from Oberhausen to Munich, and by the new company name, MAN AG.

Rudolf Rupprecht repelled a takeover attempt in 2003. Furthermore, the disposition of the 50% share of the SMS Group and the strengthening of the turbomachinery division through the takeover of Sulzer Turbo induced MAN's focusing process.

In 2006, MAN entered into an agreement with Indian company Force Motors to establish a 50:50 joint venture for the production of trucks and buses in India for the domestic and export markets. The joint venture established a truck manufacturing plant in Pithampur, Madhya Pradesh, and launched its first truck for the Indian market in 2007. At the end of 2011, MAN bought out the stake of its Indian partner, and its operations in India became a wholly owned subsidiary of MAN in early 2012. MAN ended production and sales in India and sold the Pithampur plant back to Force Motors in 2018.

In September 2006, MAN produced an offer for the take-over of the Swedish competitor Scania AB. The European Commission approved the takeover on 14 December. Nevertheless, MAN voluntarily withdrew the offer on 23 January 2007, after Scania's major shareholders Volkswagen AG and the influential Wallenberg family had declined the offer. On 24 December 2008, MAN published to possess further stock options of Scania and to therefore maintain more than 20% of the voting rights. As of October 2019, MAN SE still owns 17.37% of the voting rights in Scania, with the remainder of Scania being directly owned by Volkswagen Group's heavy commercial vehicle subsidiary, Traton SE.

In 2008, the MAN group celebrated its 250th anniversary with numerous events, such as exhibitions in several museums, a vintage car tour with the motto "MAN on the road again", and a great anniversary gala. At the beginning of December 2008, MAN took over Volkswagen's Brazilian truck and bus operation, Volkswagen Caminhões e Ônibus, putting the division under the control of MAN Latin America. Therewith, MAN now is a market leader in Brazil, with a market share of 30%.

Since May 2009, the group is incorporated as European corporation MAN SE. In July 2009, MAN published to merge the two divisions, MAN Turbo and MAN Diesel, into one business area called Power Engineering. In addition, the group contracted a strategic partnership with Chinese truck manufacturer Sinotruk, purchasing 25% + 1 share of the company. In the course of this focusing process, many smaller subsidiaries and divisions have been sold.

In 2009, investigators of the Munich Prosecutor's Office uncovered a corruption affair, in which MAN had been bribing business partners and governments in over 20 countries from 2001 to 2007, to get large orders for buses and trucks. MAN CEO Håkan Samuelsson and other board members had to resign. The board of directors appointed Dr.-Ing. Georg Pachta-Reyhofen, the former CEO of MAN Diesel, as successor. On 17 December 2009, Pachta-Reyhofen was assigned as speaker of the board and CEO of MAN SE by the board of directors.

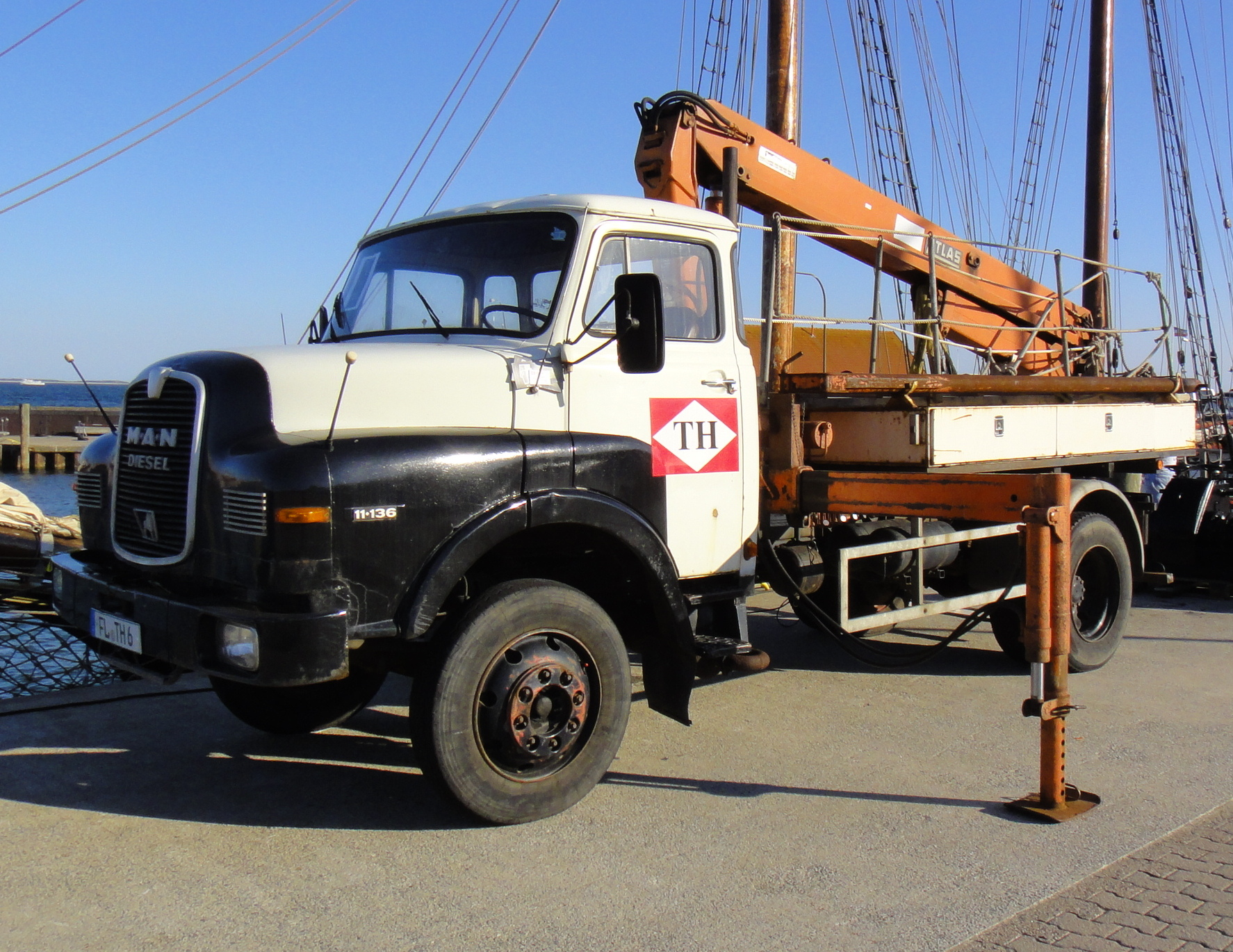
MAN truck 11-136

MAN fire engine

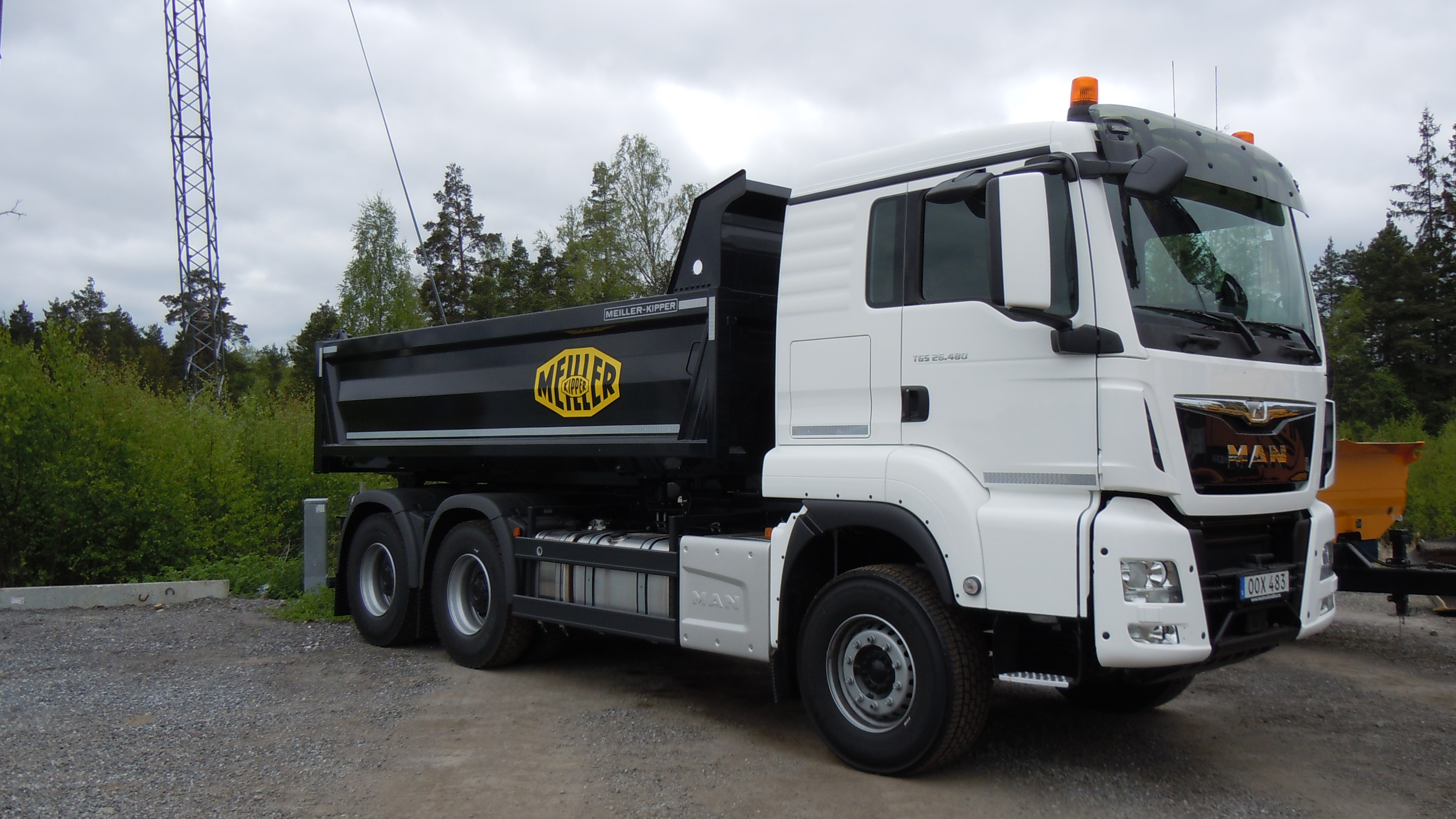
A 2016 MAN TGS 26.480 6×4 BL (30S) truck

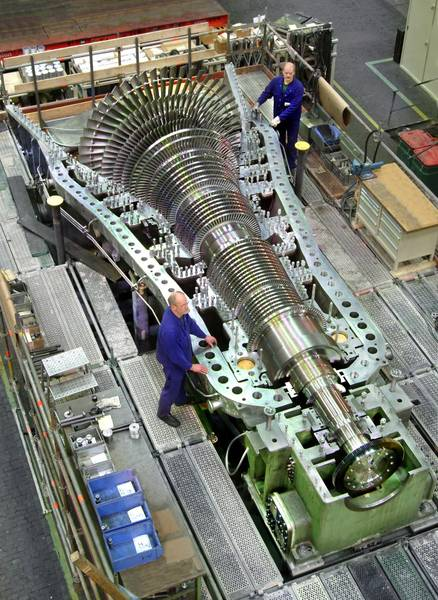
MAN steam turbine

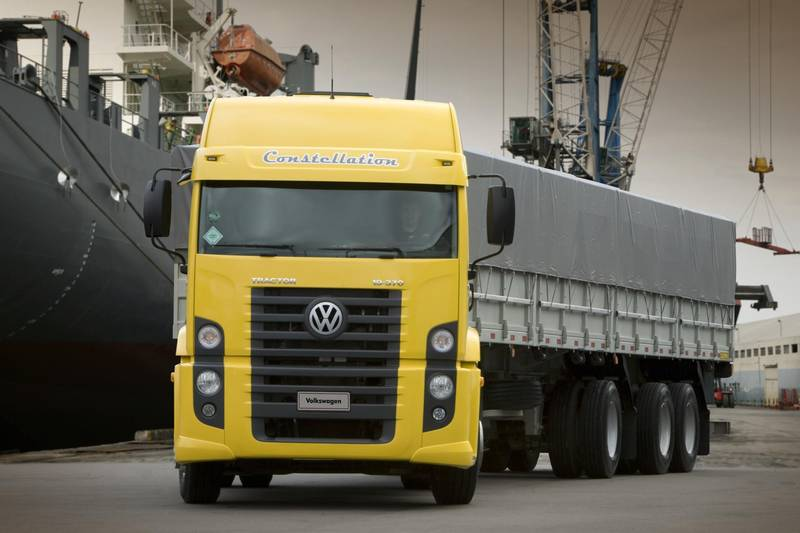
Volkswagen Caminhões e Ônibus Constellation truck

=== Takeover by Volkswagen ===
In July 2011, Volkswagen AG acquired a 55.9% voting stake and 53.7% of the share capital in MAN SE. Pending regulatory approval, Volkswagen planned to merge MAN and Scania AB to create Europe's largest truck maker. The combined trucks group is planned to save about 400 million euros per year, mainly by bundling procurement. Regulatory approval was granted, and the takeover was completed in November 2011.

In April 2012, MAN SE announced that Volkswagen had increased its interest to a 73.0% voting stake and 71.08% of the share capital.

On 6 June 2012, Volkswagen AG announced that it had increased its share of voting rights in MAN SE to 75.03%, paving the way for a domination agreement to be put in place.

From January 2019, MAN's Power Engineering division, made up of MAN Energy Solutions (formerly MAN Diesel and Turbo) and MAN SE's 76% stake in RENK AG were sold to the Volkswagen Group, leaving MAN SE as the holding company for commercial vehicle units, MAN Truck & Bus, and MAN Latin America, under the responsibility of Volkswagen's subsidiary, Traton SE.

In March 2019, MAN SE announced that 94.36% of its shares were held by Traton.

In February 2020, Traton announced that it intended to merge MAN SE with Traton to simplify the latter's overall structure. As a result of the merger, MAN Truck & Bus, Scania AB, and Volkswagen Caminhões e Ônibus became wholly owned, direct subsidiaries of Traton.

In September 2020, the company announced that it would be cutting over 9,500 job positions at its MAN Truck & Bus division, as a result of the COVID-19 pandemic economic effects. The company made the move to generate €1.8 billion of cost savings by 2023, which was a success.

== Legal issues ==
In 2011, a former manager in the company was charged with bribery of Turkmen state officials in exchange for project contracts in 2002. The trial began in Munich in 2019 after a delay of the initial trial set for 2016. The MAN manager was suspected in giving 8.4 million euros in bribes in 2002–2007 to the head of the state-owned Turkmennebit company, Saparmammet Veliev.

== Sponsorship ==
MAN Truck & Bus is a sponsor and partner of various KTM teams and events, particularly in MotoGP and other racing series. They provide logistical support, including equipment and team transportation, using their high-performance trucks.

== See also ==
- ERF
- Gräf & Stift
- ÖAF
- Voith
- ZF Friedrichshafen
