= Volkswagen Delivery =

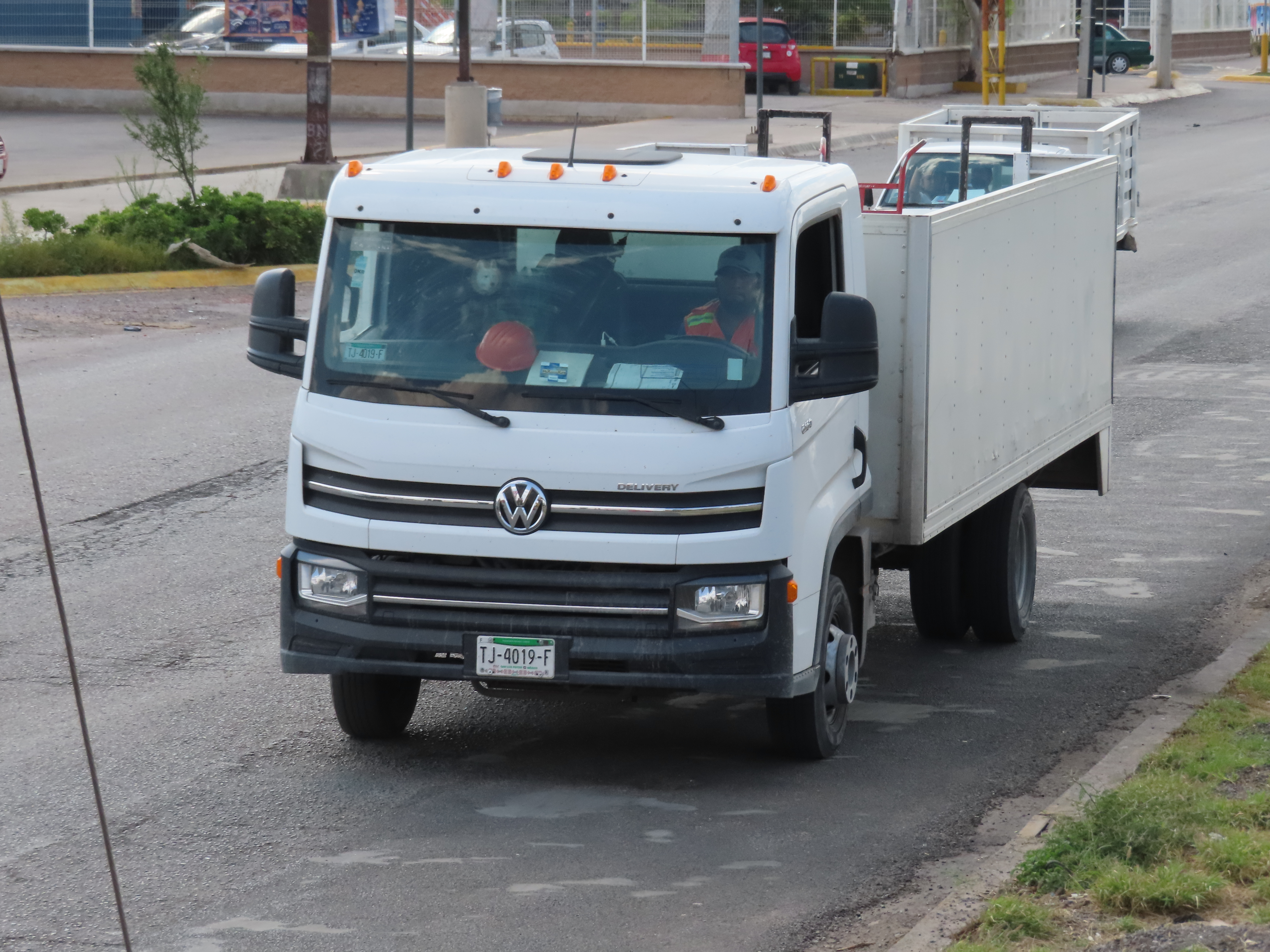

Overview
- Manufacturer: Volkswagen Truck & Bus
- Also called: Volkswagen Nueva línea (Argentina, 1998-2002); Volkswagen Livianos (Argentina, 2008-2011)
- Production: 1995–present

Body and chassis
- Layout: Front engine, rear-wheel drive

The Volkswagen Delivery is a series of light trucks (4 to 13 tons) manufactured by Volkswagen Truck & Bus. It has been produced since 1995, and sits above the Volkswagen Commercial Vehicles light commercial vehicle range; Caddy, Transporter, Crafter and Amarok.

The delivery truck gets its name from its vocation of urban and rural pickup and deliveries.

== History ==
The Delivery I was first introduced for the South American market in 1995. A version was offered in Europe that was called the Volkswagen L80. While sales of the L80 ended in Europe in 2000, the Delivery in South America is still in production.

An updated version called the Delivery II was launched in 2018, with a diesel and electric version, called the e-Delivery. The Delivery I is still in production, but is now part of the Volkswagen Worker range.

== Delivery I (2005–2019) ==
Delivery I
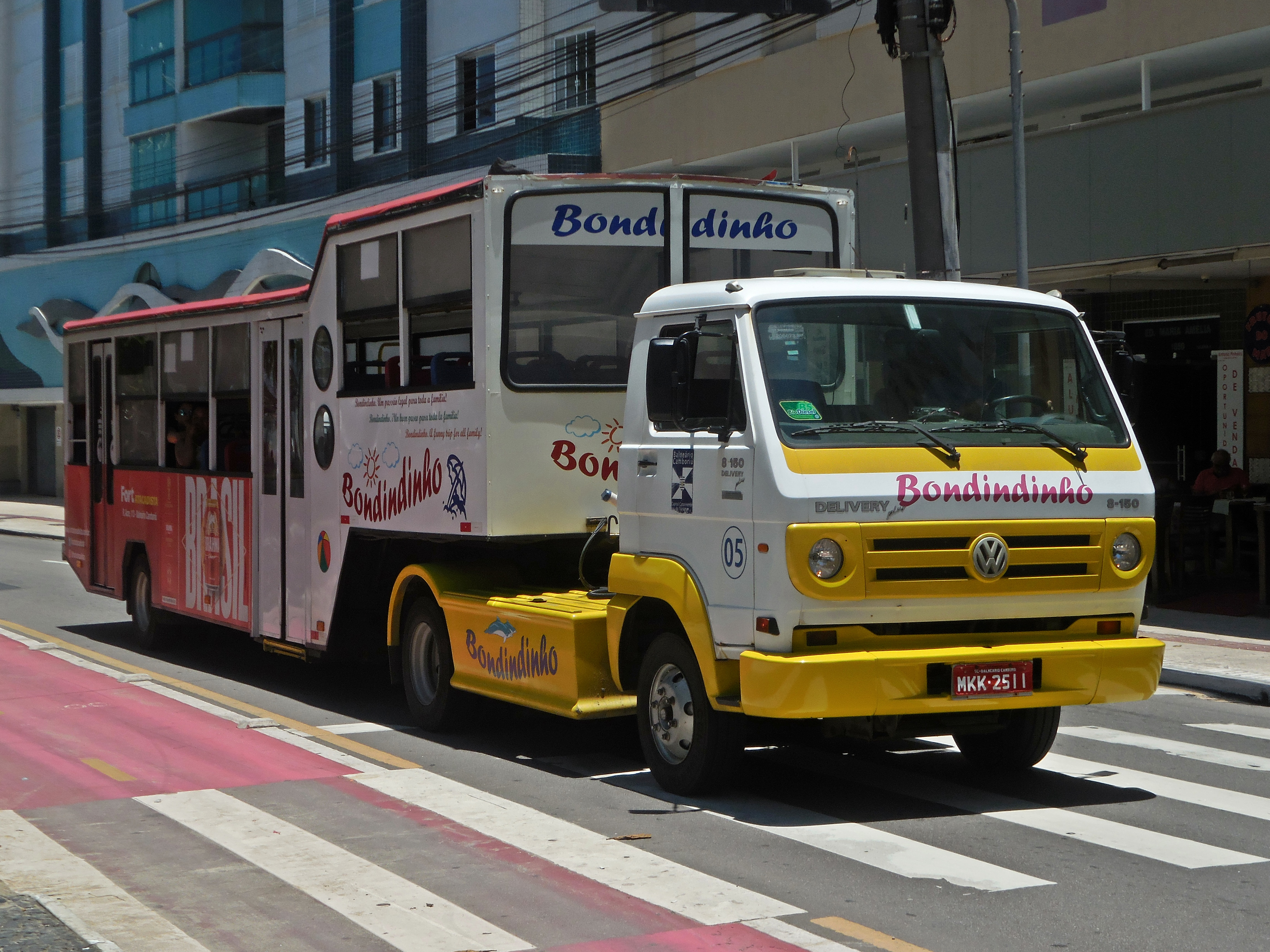

Overview
- Production: 1995–2018

Body and chassis
- Body style: Light truck

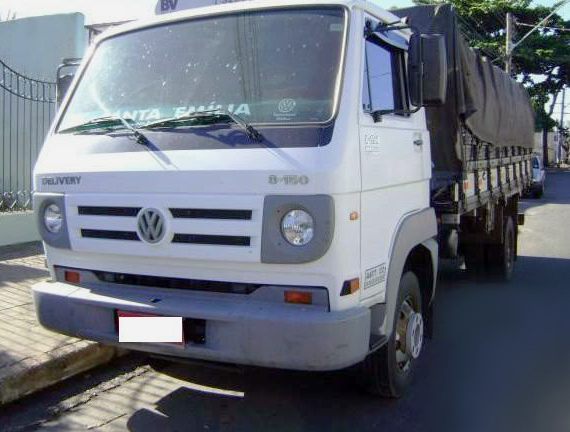
Volkswagen Delivery I

=== Specifications ===
Model	Motor	Gearbox
5.140	MWM Sprint 4.08 TCE 3.0L	Manual 5 speed
8.150	MWM Sprint 4.08 TCE 3.0L	Manual 5 speed
8.150 Plus	Cummins ISB-4 MaxPower 3.9L	Manual 5 speed
8.160	Cummins ISF 3.8L	Manual 5 speed
9.150	Cummins ISB-4 MaxPower 3.9L	Manual 5 speed
9.160	Cummins ISF 3.8L	Manual 5 speed
10.160	Cummins ISF 3.8L	Manual 5 speed
13.160	Cummins ISF 3.8L	Manual 5 speed

The diesel engines are Euro III compliant.

== Delivery II (2018–present) ==
Delivery II
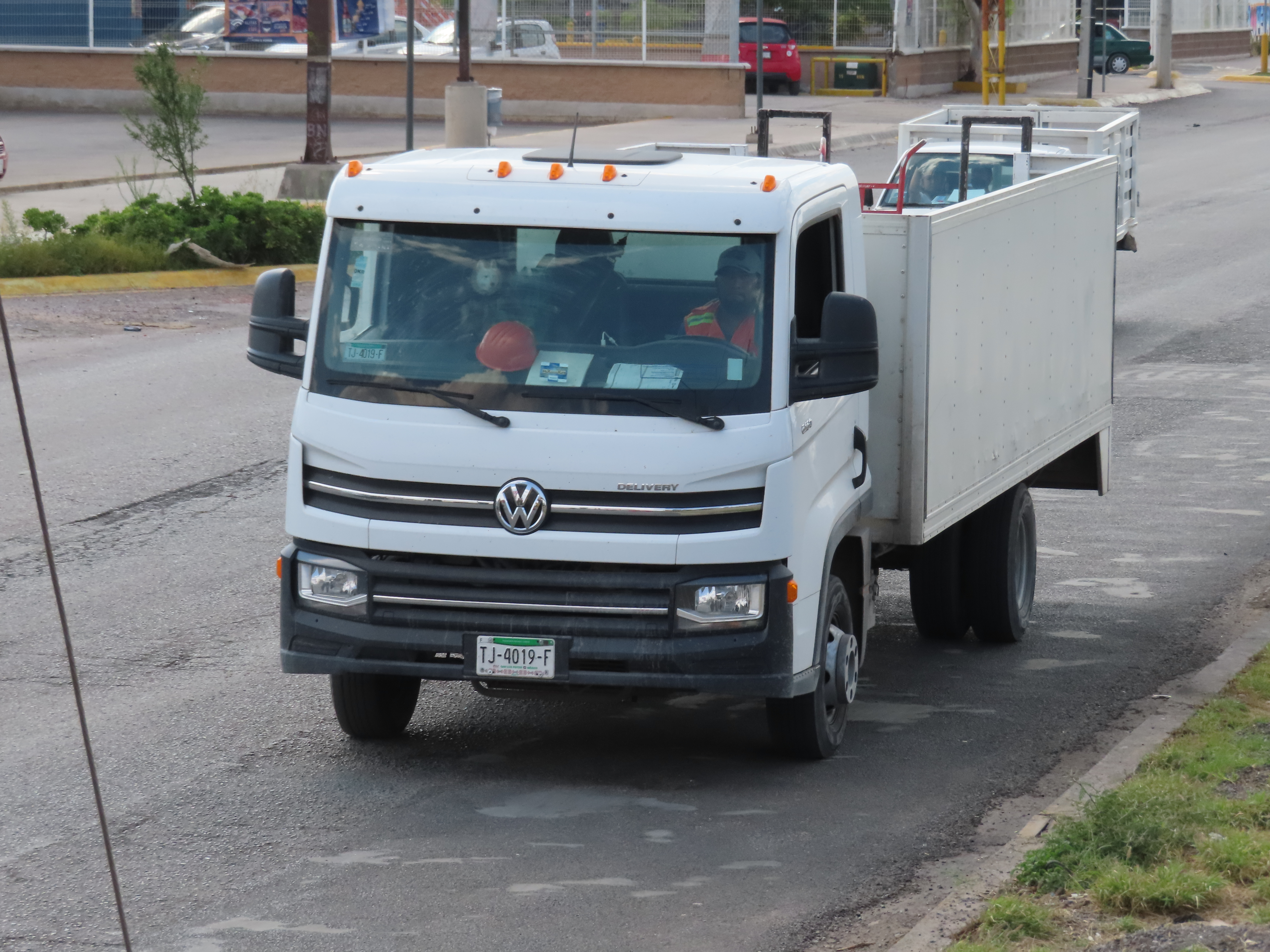

Overview
- Production: 2018–present

Body and chassis
- Body style: Light truck

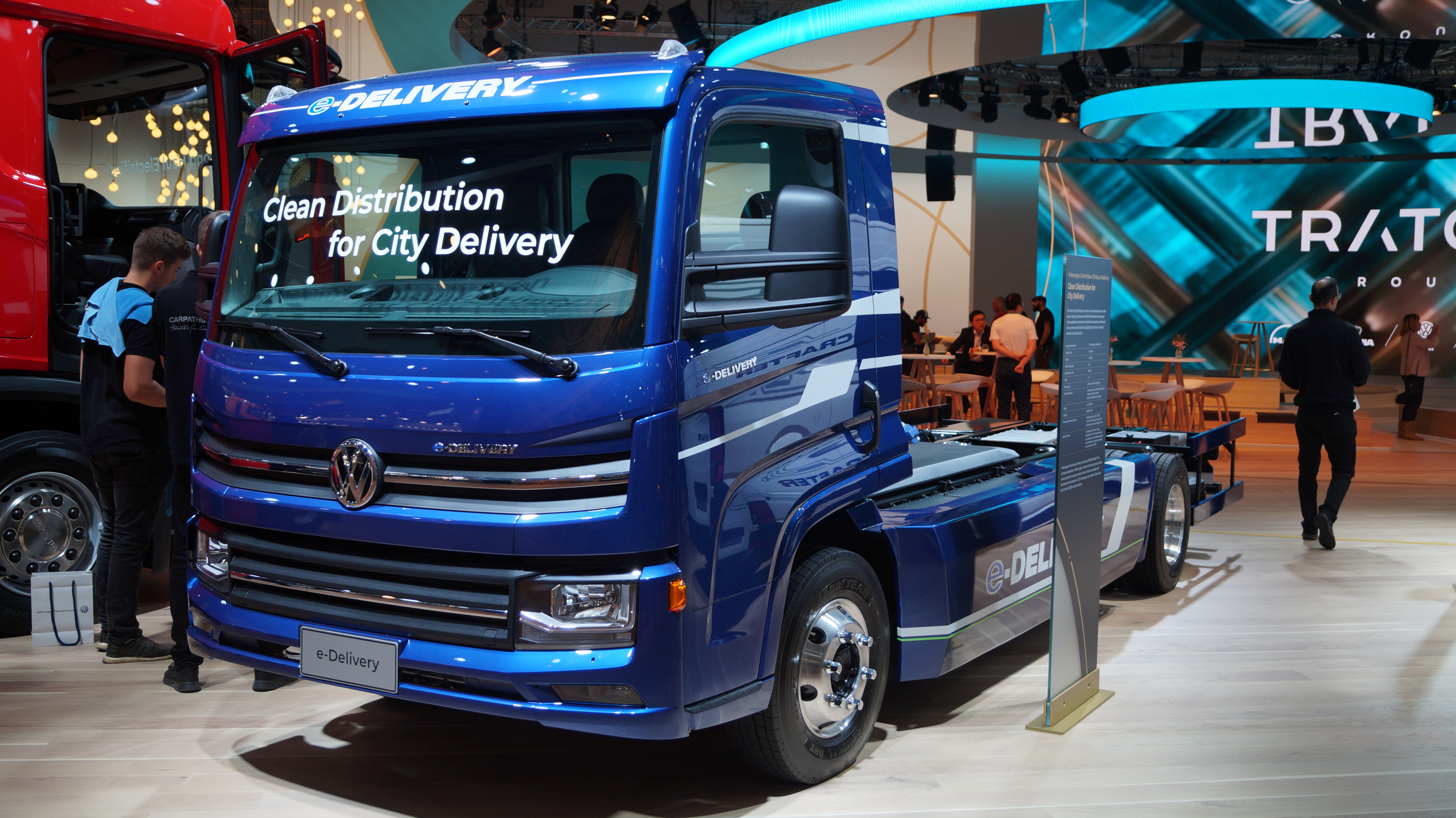
Volkswagen e-Delivery

=== Specifications ===
Model	Motor	Gearbox
Express (4x2) (2017-2021)	Cummins 2.8l 150 hp - 360 Nm	Manual 6 speed
Express+ (4x2) (2022–present)	Iveco F1C 3.0l 156 hp - 367 Nm	Manual 6 speed
4,150 (4x2)	Cummins ISF 2.8l 150 hp - 360 Nm	Manual Eaton ESO 6 speed
6,160 (4x2)	Cummins 2.8l 156 hp - 430 Nm	Manual Eaton ESO 6 speed
9,170 (4x2)	Cummins 3.8l 167 hp - 600 Nm	Manual Eaton ESO 6 speed
11,180 (4x2)	Cummins ISF 3.8l 175 hp - 600 Nm	Manual Eaton ESO 6 speed
13,180 (6x2)	Cummins ISF 3.8l 175 hp - 600 Nm	Manual Eaton ESO 6 speed

The Cummins engines are compliant with Euro V standards, the Iveco engine is compliant with Euro VI standards.

- e-Delivery

At the IAA Salon 2018, Volkswagen exhibited the electric version of the Delivery. Two models are commercially available:

- The VW e-Delivery 11 (4x2) model with pneumatic suspension and 10.7 tonnes of PTAC, 300 kW and a torque of 2,150 Nm,
- The VW e-Delivery 14 (6x2) model with pneumatic suspension and 14.3 tonnes of PTAC, 300 kW and a torque of 2,150 Nm.
