= Volkswagen L80 =

Car model

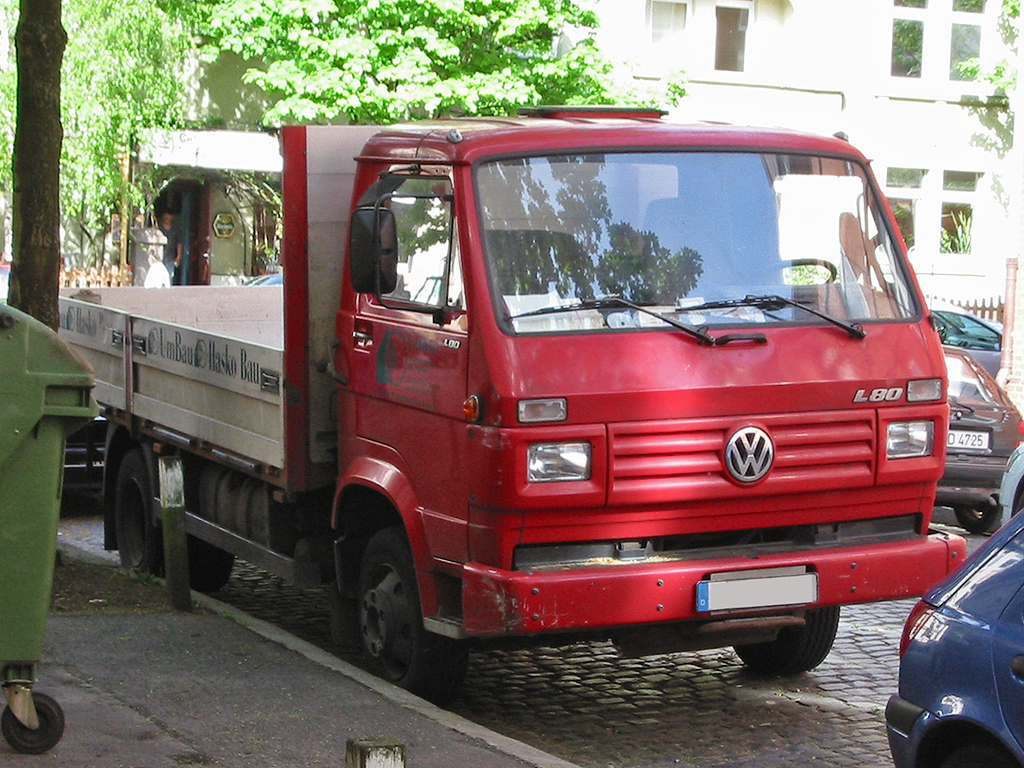
L80 1994–2000 (Brazilian built)

In 1994 Volkswagen Commercial Vehicles in Europe and Volkswagen of Brazil launched the jointly developed L80 light truck for the European market.

The L80 came in only one specification with a MWM 4.3L 4cylinder diesel motor producing 103 kW (138 hp) at 2600 rpm with torque of 430 N⋅m (317 lbf⋅ft) at 1,600 to 2,000 rpm. It met the European exhaust and emissions tests of 91/542/EEC Standard to EG/70/157.

The chassis of the L80 was tested extensively on South American roads and had a gross vehicle weight of 7,490 kg (16,513 lb) and a 3,270 kg (7,209 lb) loading capacity. Tyres had a dimension of 215/75 x 17.5 which complied German standards of the time.

The cab was borrowed from the Volkswagen LT series; a different front bumper and headlights it gave the L80 a different appearance.

The L80 was discontinued from sale in Europe in 2000 due to stringent European emission regulations.

LIGHT TRUCK
Model	Engine Make/Capacity	Power kW@rpm	Torque Nm@rpm	Transmission Make/Type/Speed	GVM (kg) Technical Capacity	GCM (kg) Technical Capacity
L80	MWM 4.3 (Turbo Diesel)	103 kW (138 hp) @ 2600	430 N⋅m (317 lbf⋅ft) @ 1600-2000	5 Speed Manual	3270	7490
