= Volkswagen Volksbus =

Series of Brazilian city buses since 1993

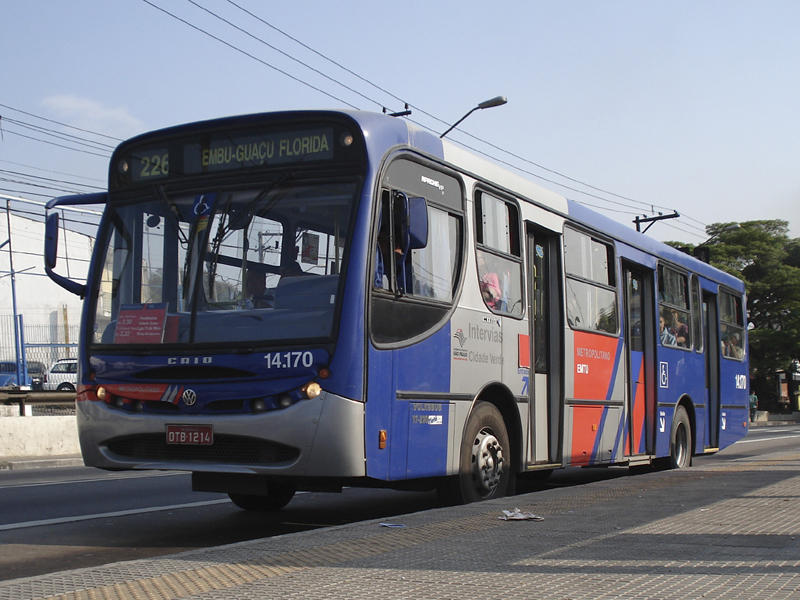
- Volksbus 17.240 with a CAIO body on a Brazilian street.

Overview
- Manufacturer: Volkswagen Truck & Bus
- Production: 1993–present
- Assembly: Resende, Brazil; Quezon City, Philippines (MACC)

Body and chassis
- Doors: 1, 2 or 3 doors
- Floor type: Step entrance

Dimensions
- Length: 6.6m to 12.0m
- Width: 2.5m
- Height: 3.0m to 4.0m

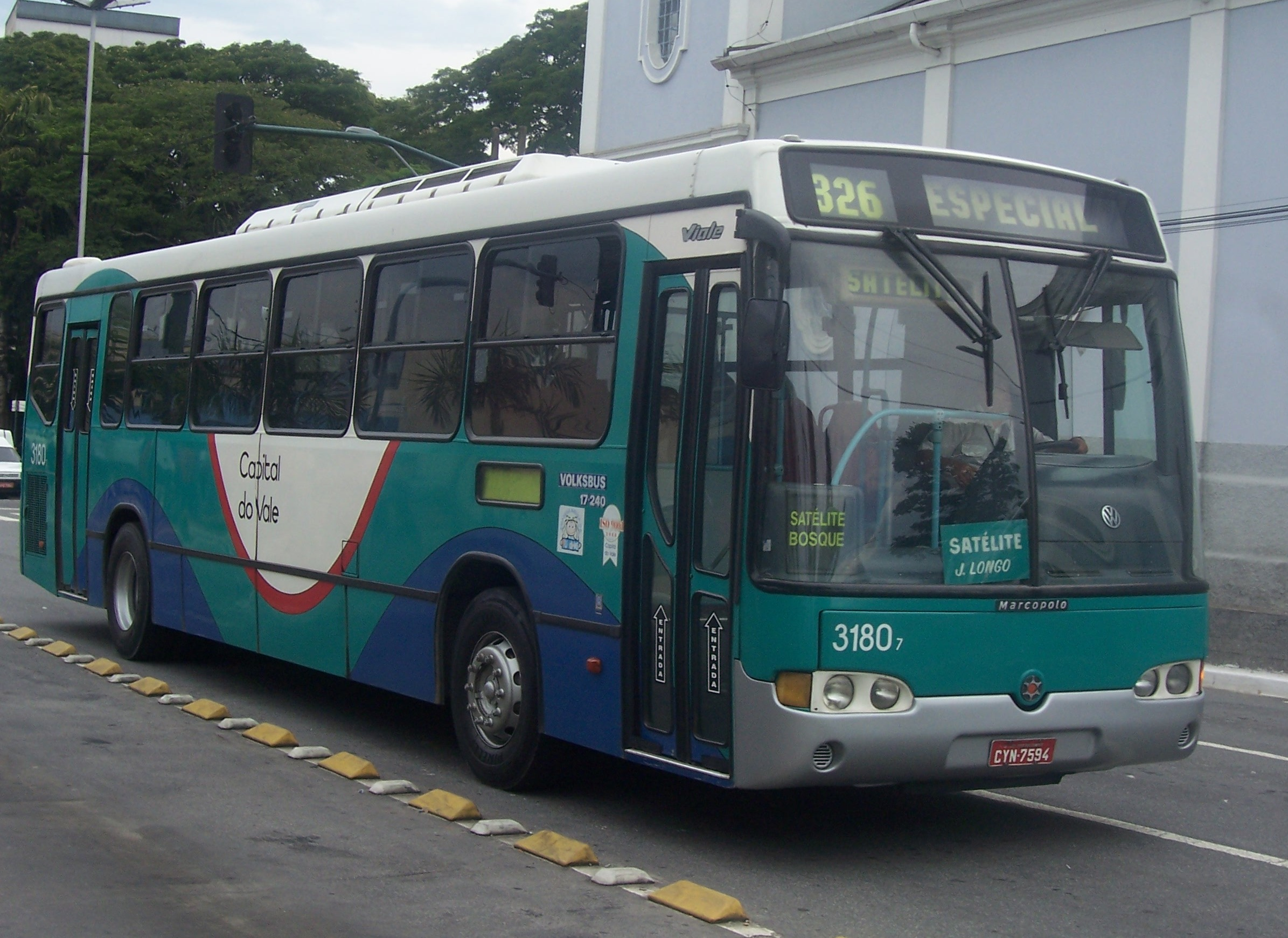
Volksbus 17.240 with a Marcopolo body on a Brazilian street

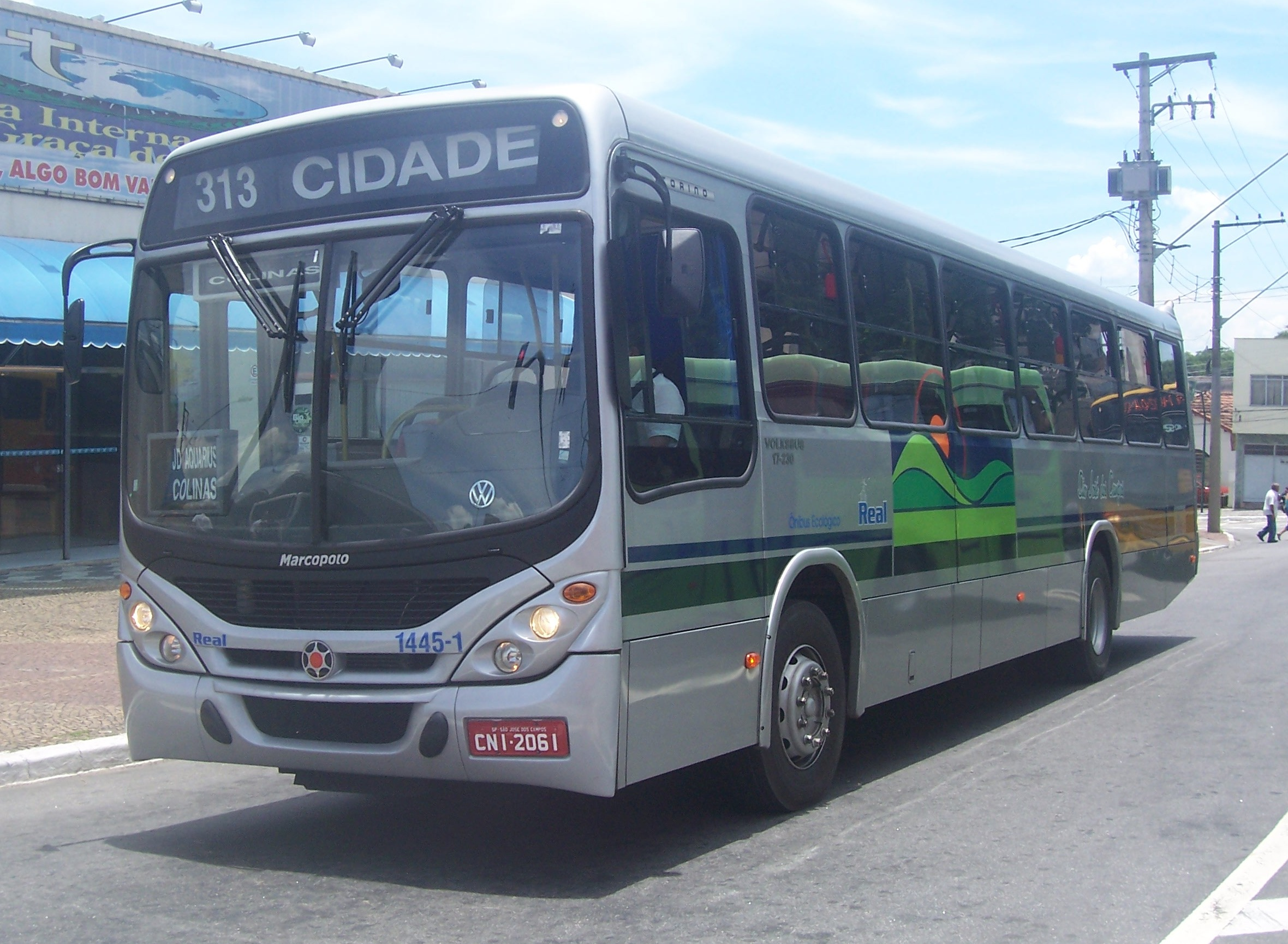
Volksbus 17.230 EOD with a Marcopolo body on a Brazilian street

The Volkswagen Volksbus is a range of step-floor city bus chassis assembled in Germany and produced by the Brazilian manufacturer Volkswagen Truck & Bus from 1993 to the present day.

Today Volkswagen Truck & Bus produce bus chassis in the 5 to 18 tonne category as microbuses, minibuses, midibuses and coaches, the majority of them are powered by MWM engines.

== Variants ==
Note: E = Electronic versions, D = Front engine, T = Rear engine

- 8.140 CO
- 8.150 OD
- 8.150 EOD
- 9.150 OD
- 9.150 EOD
- 9.160 OD
- 15.180 EOD
- 16.180 CO
- 16.210 CO Euro II
- 17.210 OD
- 17.210 EOD
- 17.240 OT
- 17.260 EOT
- 18.310 OT
- 18.310 OT Titan
- 18.320 EOT

=== Current range ===
Microbus

- 5.140 EOD
- 8.120 OD Euro III
- 8.150 OD (Export)
- 8.150 EOD

Minibus

- 9.150 OD (Export)
- 9.150 EOD
- 9.160 OD

Medium

- 15.180 EOD
- 15.190 EOD
- 17.210 EOD
- 17.230 EOD
- 17.260 EOT

Coach

- 18.280 OT LE
- 18.320 EOT

== Conversions ==
All bodies are assembled by private coachbuilders. The coachbuilders then manufacture them to desired configuration e.g. school bus, shuttle bus, tour bus & coaches etc.

Main users of Volksbus chassis' are:

South American manufacturers

- Irizar
- Marcopolo
- Neobus
- Caio Induscar
- Rosmo
- Comil
- AGA
- Mascarello
- Modasa
- Inrecar
- Metalpar

Mexican Manufacturers

- AYCO
- Novacapre

South African manufacturers

- Busmark 2000
- Busaf
- Irizar
- Marcopolo

Kenyan Manufacturers

- Banbros

== See also ==
- Microbus
- Minibus
- Midibus
- Coach (bus)
