= Volkswagen Truck & Bus =

Brazilian vehicle manufacturing company

Volkswagen Truck & Bus Indústria e Comércio de Veículos Ltda
- Formerly: Volkswagen Caminhões e Ônibus; MAN Latin America; Volkswagen Caminhões
- Type: Subsidiary
- Industry: Automotive
- Founded: 1981; 45 years ago
- Headquarters: Resende, Brazil
- Area served: Latin America, Africa and Middle East
- Key people: Roberto Cortes (president)
- Products: Commercial vehicles
- Parent: Traton
- Website: vwco.com.br

Volkswagen Truck & Bus Indústria e Comércio de Veículos Ltda., formerly known as Volkswagen Caminhões e Ônibus, is a Brazilian commercial vehicle manufacturing company based in Resende, Brazil and a subsidiary of Traton. It manufactures heavy trucks and buses under the Volkswagen marque.

Volkswagen Truck and Bus was originally a part of the Volkswagen Commercial Vehicles division of the Volkswagen Group. On 1 January 2009, it was sold to MAN SE, and formed its MAN Latin America division. In August 2021, MAN SE was merged with Traton SE, with the latter becoming the direct owner and parent of Volkswagen Truck and Bus.

== Volkswagen Truck and Bus operation ==
In 1979, Volkswagenwerk AG acquired a 67% percent stake in Chrysler Motors do Brasil Ltda (:pt). In January 1980, it increased its shareholding to 100%, therefore giving it the right to rename the company to Volkswagen Caminhões Ltda.

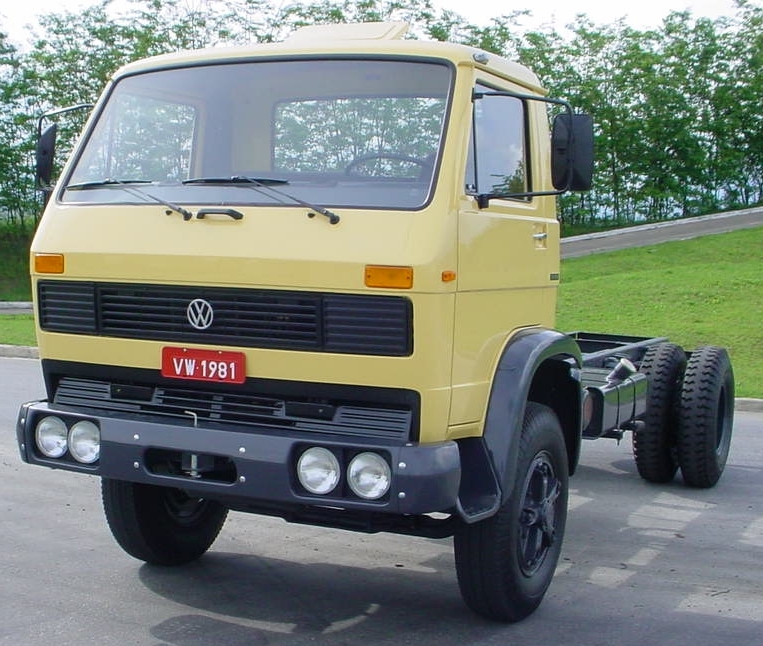
The first Volkswagen Truck – the 1981 13.130

Volkswagen Caminhões Ltda. released their first trucks in February/March 1981; the Volkswagen 11.130 and the Volkswagen 13.130, both had a reworked version of Volkswagen's Mk1 LT cabin, and were powered by MWM Motores Diesel Ltda (MWM) diesel engines on Chrysler engineered platforms which were inherited from the takeover.

== AutoLatina years ==
From 1987 to 1996, Volkswagen Trucks and Buses were built with Ford components as part of the AutoLatina venture, and were built in Ford's Ipiranga complex in Brazil.

Once the AutoLatina marriage fell through, Volkswagen Group had no factory for its trucks and their parts, so the Resende plant was built in 1995.

== Resende rebirth ==
1996, Resende was the official start for Volkswagen Trucks and Buses, developing their own parts and platforms. The Modular Consortium was introduced for the first time in Resende.

== Modular Consortium ==
The Modular Consortium is the group of main suppliers that make the parts, and assembles them for Volkswagen Truck and Bus on site in the Resende factory.

Volkswagen Groups involvement is only in supplying the factory and inspection at the end of production; Volkswagen pays only a small amount of wages, as each partner of the Modular Consortium pays the workers.

The Modular Consortium comprises these companies:

- Maxion Sistemas Automotivos Ltda. manufacture the chassis parts such as Air Reservoir, Fuel Tank and Frame
- Cummins manufactures the Suspension and Axle parts such as Springs and Hubs and Drums
- Maxion manufactures the Tires and Wheels
- Carese manages the Body Shop
- PowerTrain manages the engine preparation and assembly
- Carese manages the Paint Shop
- Kromberg and Schubert (usually referred to as KROSCHU) manufactures the Cab Trim components such as Seats and Instrument Panel

== Sales ==
Most of the early sales of the Truck and Bus chassis' operations were mainly within South America; with the exception of small exportations to China and the Middle East.

Prior to Volkswagen Commercial Vehicles' new role of managing the Truck and Bus operation; in 1994 Volkswagen imported to Germany a 7 tonne truck: the Volkswagen L80. Due to the European Union Gas Emissions EU4 standards; exports discontinued in late 2000.

== The Volkswagen Commercial Vehicles era ==
Volkswagen Commercial Vehicles took over the Brazilian Trucks and Buses operation in 2000 from Volkswagen do Brasil; Volkswagen's Brazilian subsidiary. This signaled the start of a new era for the Volkswagen Group in producing its own Heavy Truck and Bus chassis range, which covers the gross combination mass (GCM) of 5 tonnes to 57 tonnes category.

Since Volkswagen Commercial Vehicles have taken control; the company has been looking at expanding Truck and Bus sales to other markets outside of South America, South Africa and Middle East regions.

All Volkswagen Caminhões e Ônibus vehicles are built in the Resende, Brazil factory and sent in semi knocked down (SKD) kits to Uitenhage in South Africa and Puebla in Mexico.

Planned future markets for export are ASEAN and Eastern Europe countries.

Volkswagen Caminhões e Ônibus released the new Volkswagen Constellation range in September 2005, with a gross combination mass from 13 tonnes to 57 tonnes.

== Volkswagen Truck and Bus company facts ==
- The Resende plant was built in 153 days at a cost of US$250 million
- The Resende plant adheres to International Organization for Standardization ISO TS and ISO 14001
- Resende plant produces 240 vehicles per day in two working shifts and employs 4,500 workers.
- Volkswagen Trucks and Buses are sold in over 35 countries around the world. Some of the countries are Argentina, Peru, Chile, Uruguay, Bolivia, Colombia, Venezuela, Paraguay, Ecuador, Dominican Republic, Côte d'Ivoire, Nigeria and Saudi Arabia.
- Most of the Volkswagen truck and Bus growth has been in the last eight years
- All the 2007 Volkswagen truck range are capable of operating in minus 20 °C and plus 45 °C; Middle East specified trucks can stand 55 degrees Celsius.
- Volkswagen Caminhões e Ônibus are assembled at the MAN Automotive Concessionaires Corporation plant in Quezon City, Philippines since March 2014.

== BMB Mode Center ==
Established in 2002 10 km from Resende the assembly plant, the BMB Mode Center is responsible for modifications to the truck and bus range that cannot be done on the production line.

BMB Mode Center build:

- For bus range: low entry buses and articulated buses.
- For truck range: 4x4, 8x4 & 8x2 conversions as well as an armored truck & finally exterior design modifications.

The BMB division moved in June 2006 to the new location 150 m outside the Resende Plant. The new location has 30,000 square metres of land; it cost Brazilian R$7 million to build.

== Volkswagen Truck and Bus highlights ==
=== 1980s ===
January 1981
Volkswagenwerk AG acquires 100% of the Chrysler Motors of Brazil Ltda
February 1981
Volkswagen Caminhões Ltda releases first trucks — 11.130, 13.130, and an ethanol powered truck
March 1981
Changing of name from Chrysler Motors of Brazil Ltda to Volkswagen Caminhões Ltda (Caminhões is Portuguese for trucks)
September 1982
Launching of 6 tonne truck range
July 1984
Integration of Volkswagen Caminhões Ltda. into Volkswagen do Brasil
August 1984
Volkswagen 140, the first methane gas/biogas powered truck in Brazil
July 1985
Volkswagen 11.130 exported to China
July 1987
Truck division integrates with Ford Trucks with the formation of AutoLatina

=== 1990s ===
July 1990
Volkswagen Caminhões e Ônibus plant moves to Industrial Complex of the Ipiranga
April 1993
Launching of the first Volkswagen Volksbus chassis 16.180 CO
April 1994
Volkswagen Caminhões e Ônibus celebrate 100,000th VWCV truck produced
June 1995
Beginning of the Volkswagen L80 exports to Germany
Volkswagen Caminhões Ltda. announces Resende, Brazil as site for the construction of the future Truck and Bus plant
November 1996
Volkswagen Caminhões Ltda moves to new Resende plant
September 1997
Commemoration of the 5000th vehicle made in the Resende plant
June 1998
Launching of the Volkswagen Trucks for the Argentine market
Export of complete knock down (CKD) kits of Volksbus microbus chassis to Colombia

=== 2000s ===
January 2000
Volkswagen Commercial Vehicles (VWN) of Germany, with headquarters in Hanover, assumes the responsibility for the Truck and Bus operation
March 2000
Launching of Series 2000
April 2001
For the first time in its 20 years, the Volkswagen Caminhões Ltda becomes leader in the Brazilian market for trucks
August 2002
Volkswagen Caminhões e Ônibus has 30% market share of Brazilian market, Brazil is the Number 1 in the world, buyer of Buses and Number 2 for Trucks
December 2002
Production of 100,000th Volkswagen truck in Resende
July 2003
Volkswagen Caminhões e Ônibus participates in the International Rally of the Sertões, with three 8.150 trucks
October 2003
Announcement of the creation of Volkswagen Truck and Bus Operation in Mexico, construction of an assembly line starts in the City of Puebla, Mexico
November 2003
In pioneering research in Brazil, Volkswagen tests a Volksbus powered by biodiesel with the support of the Government of the State of Rio de Janeiro and the UFRJ, in the Riobiodiesel project
April 2004
Volkswagen 18.310 successful for the first time in the Super European Truck Championship
July 2004
Volkswagen Caminhões e Ônibus add three more vehicles in the RioBiodiesel programme
August 2004
First Volkswagen truck production tests are conducted in the plant of Puebla, Mexico
September 2004
Volkswagen announces construction of plant for Volkswagen Truck and Bus range in Port Elizabeth, South Africa
October 2004
The Puebla, Mexican Volkswagen plant officially opens
Volkswagen Titan 18.310 is champion in the Super European Truck Championships in the first year it competes
October 2005
Beginning of the Volkswagen Truck and Bus operation in South Africa with the production of three Volksbus models
November 2005
Volkswagen Truck and Bus release Delivery (5 to 8 tonnes) and Constellation (13 to 45 tonnes) lines
June 2006
The BMB Mode Centre is opened for specialised modification of Volkswagen Caminhões e Ônibus range
The Constellation Daycab is released
September 2006
The top-of-the-line 18.320 VIP Volksbus is released
February 2007
Release of the 31.320 6x4 Constellation, and 15.190, 17.230 Volksbus line
8 August 2007
Volkswagen Caminhões e Ônibus released their most powerful diesel engine – the Volkswagen NGD 370 in the Volkswagen Constellation lineup
22 August 2007
Volkswagen produce the first right hand drive heavy truck in the companies history, with the release of the Volkswagen Constellation range in South Africa
8 August 2008
Volkswagen releases a new robotised transmission in co-operation with ZF Friedrichshafen AG for the Volksbus range
15 December 2008
Volkswagen AG sells Volkswagen Caminhões e Ônibus to MAN SE to form MAN Latin America.

=== 2010s ===
3 November 2011
Volkswagen AG acquires majority share holding of 55.9% in MAN SE, thus officially bringing Volkswagen Caminhões e Ônibus back into the Volkswagen Group.
13 September 2017
Volkswagen Caminhões e Ônibus launches an all new generation of the popular Volkswagen Delivery family.

=== 2020s ===
1 September 2020
Volkswagen Caminhões e Ônibus launches their first heavy duty flagship model, the Volkswagen Meteor.
31 August 2021
MAN SE is merged with Traton SE, with the latter becoming the new owner and parent of Volkswagen Caminhões e Ônibus
18 May 2022
Volkswagen Caminhões e Ônibus announced it was changing its corporate name to Volkswagen Truck & Bus, one of its parent's former names.

== Volkswagen Truck and Bus in motorsports ==
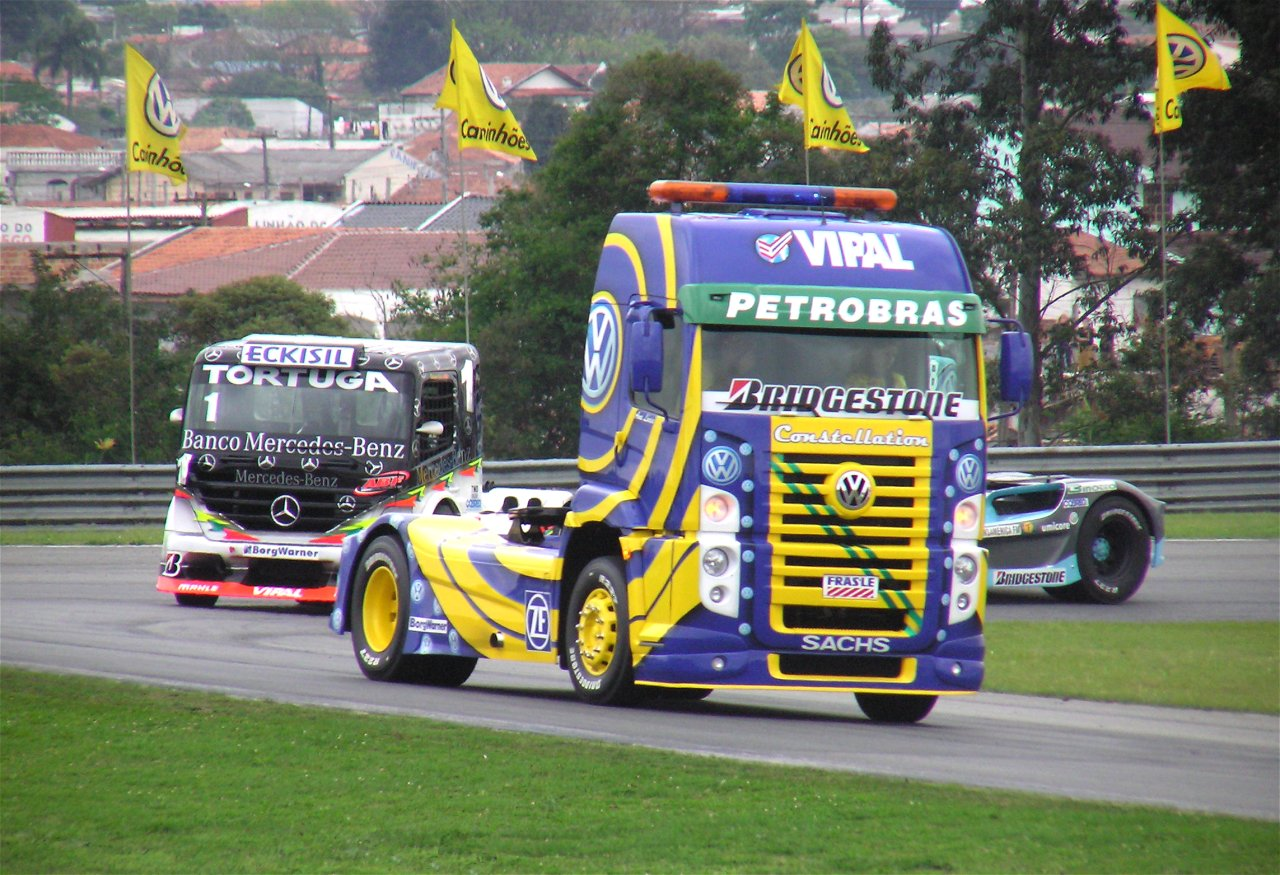
A Constellation pace truck leading the field at the 2006 Curitiba round of the Brazilian Fórmula Truck championship

Volkswagen Caminhões e Ônibus competes in the Brazilian Fórmula Truck championship, with four drivers. The Volkswagen Constellation 18.310 Titan tractor unit is used; they are driven by Renato Martins, Felipe Giaffone, Walmir Benavides and Débora Rodrigues. Furthermore, an additional Constellation is used as the official pace truck, driven by Ana Lúcia Lopes.

== Current models ==
- Volkswagen Meteor
- Volkswagen Constellation
- Volkswagen Delivery
- Volkswagen Volksbus

== Volkswagen Truck and Bus gallery ==
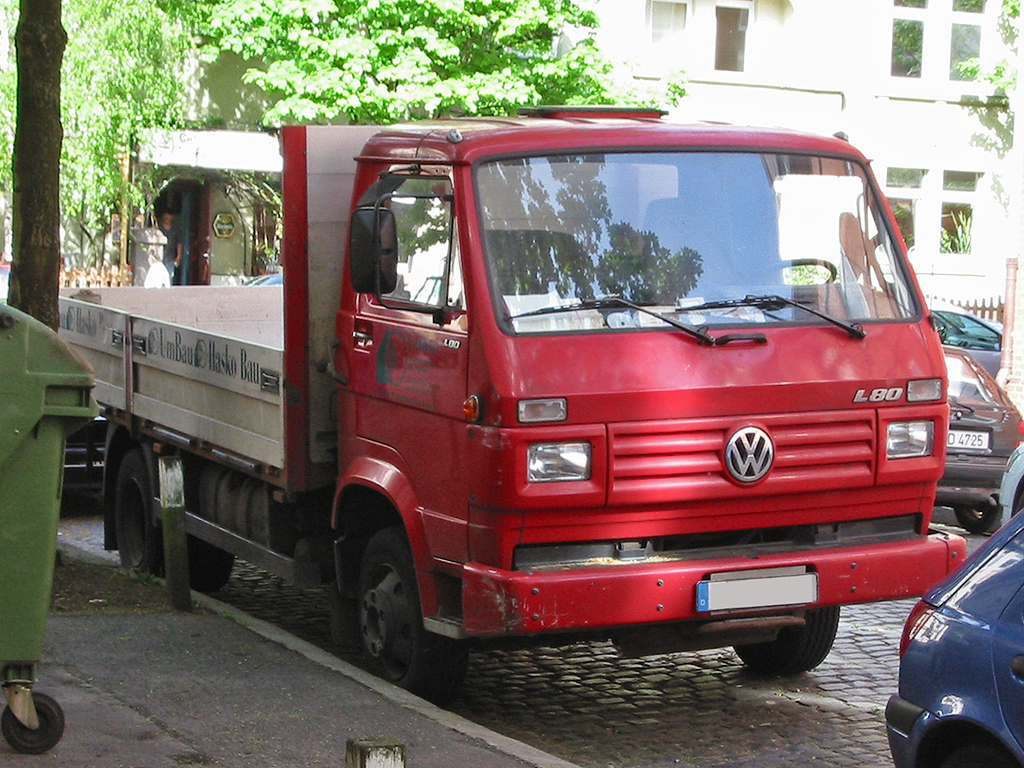
Volkswagen L80 1995—2000

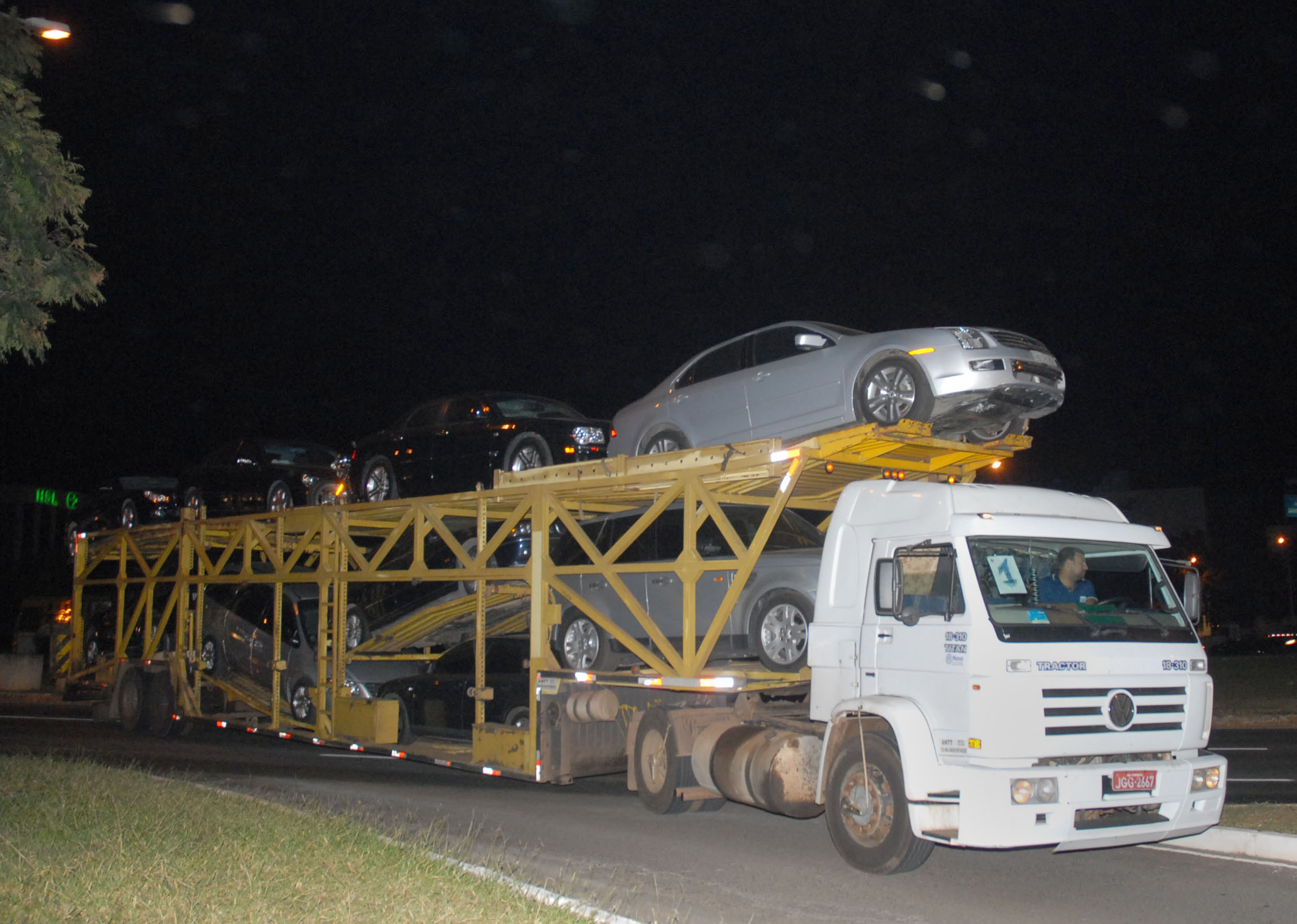
Volkswagen 18.310 Titan Tractor 2001—2005

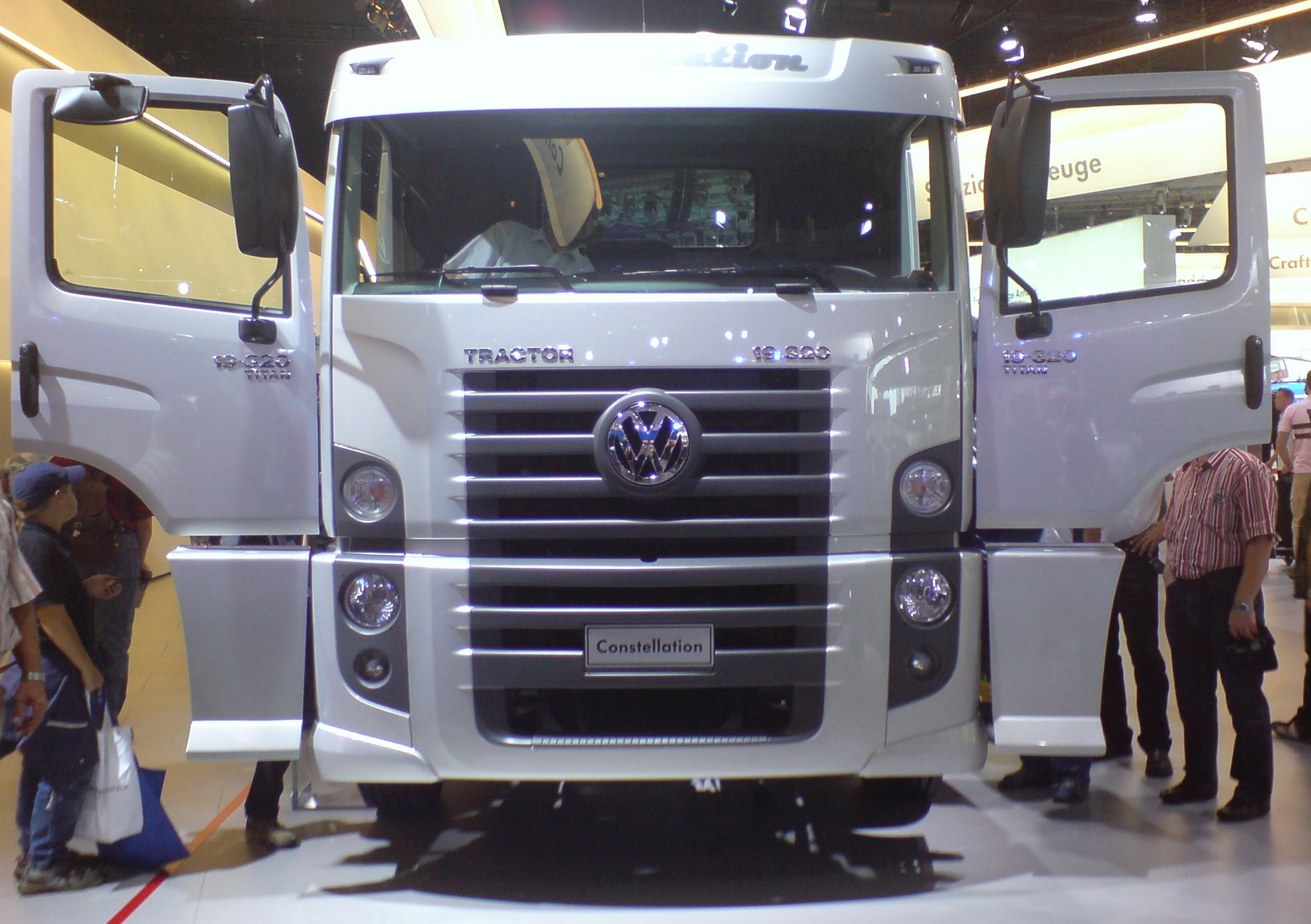
Volkswagen Constellation 19.320 Titan Tractor

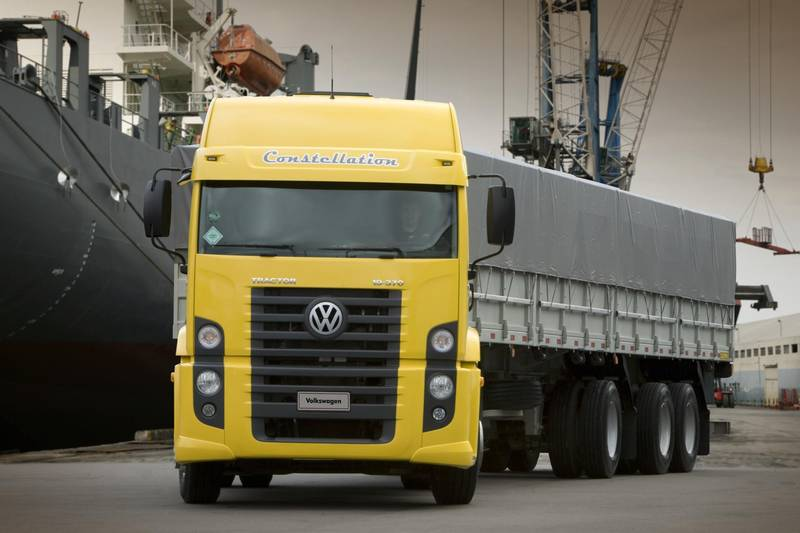
Volkswagen Constellation Tractor

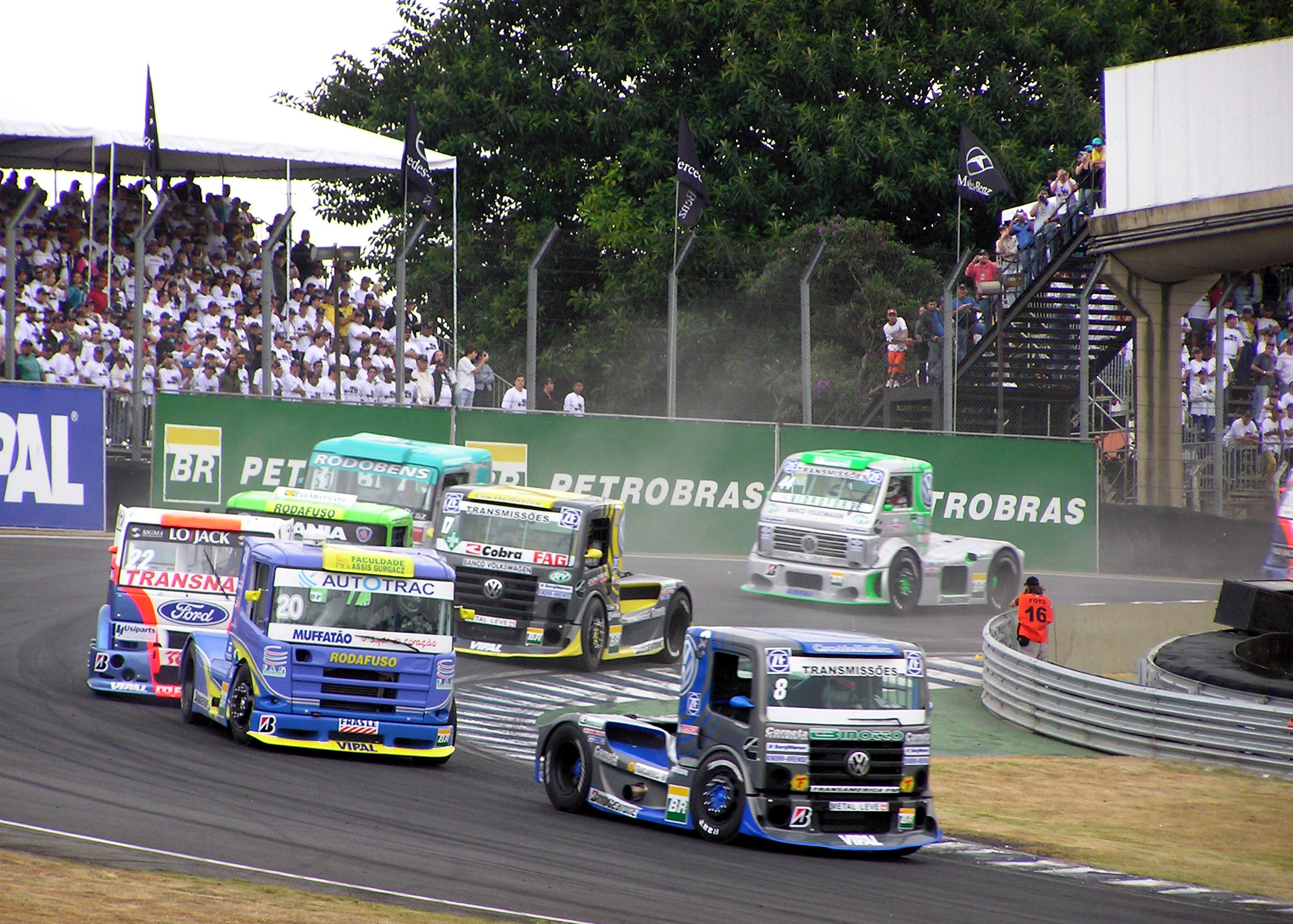
Constellation Brazilian Fórmula Truck in a round at Interlagos in 2006

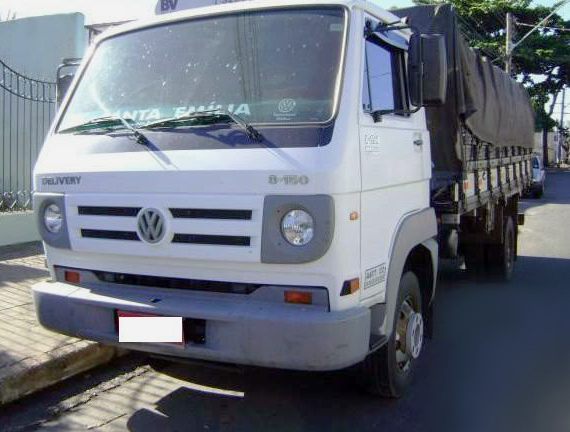
Volkswagen Delivery 8.150

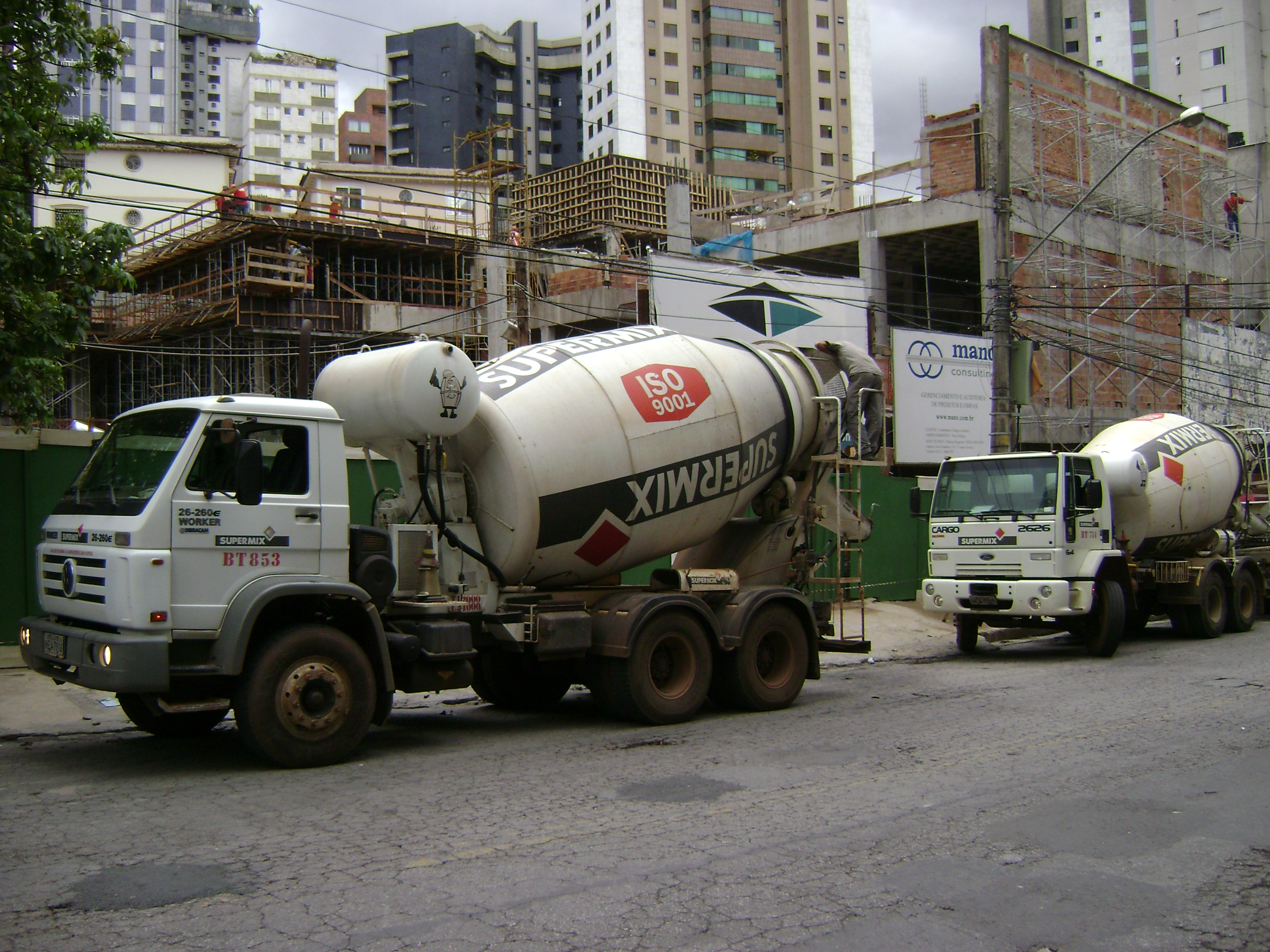
Volkswagen Worker 26-260E (6x4)

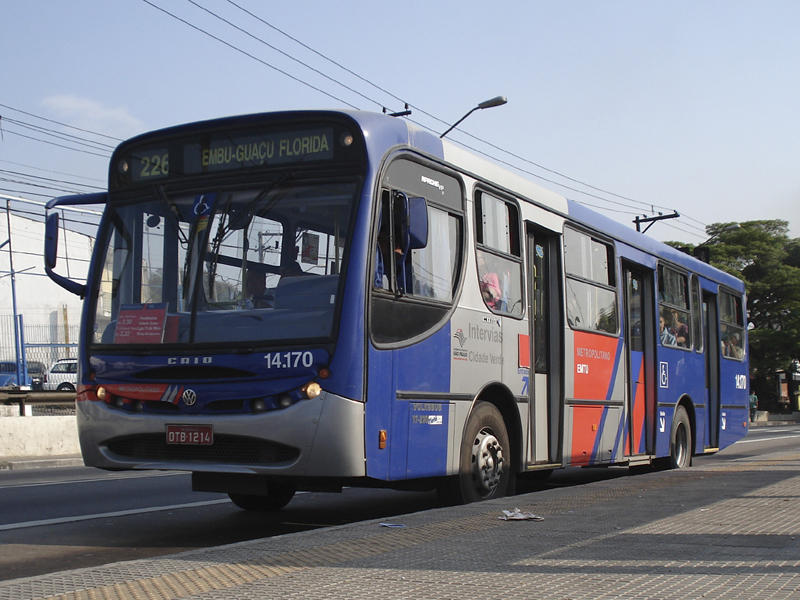
Volksbus 17.260 EOT 2005 CAIO—present

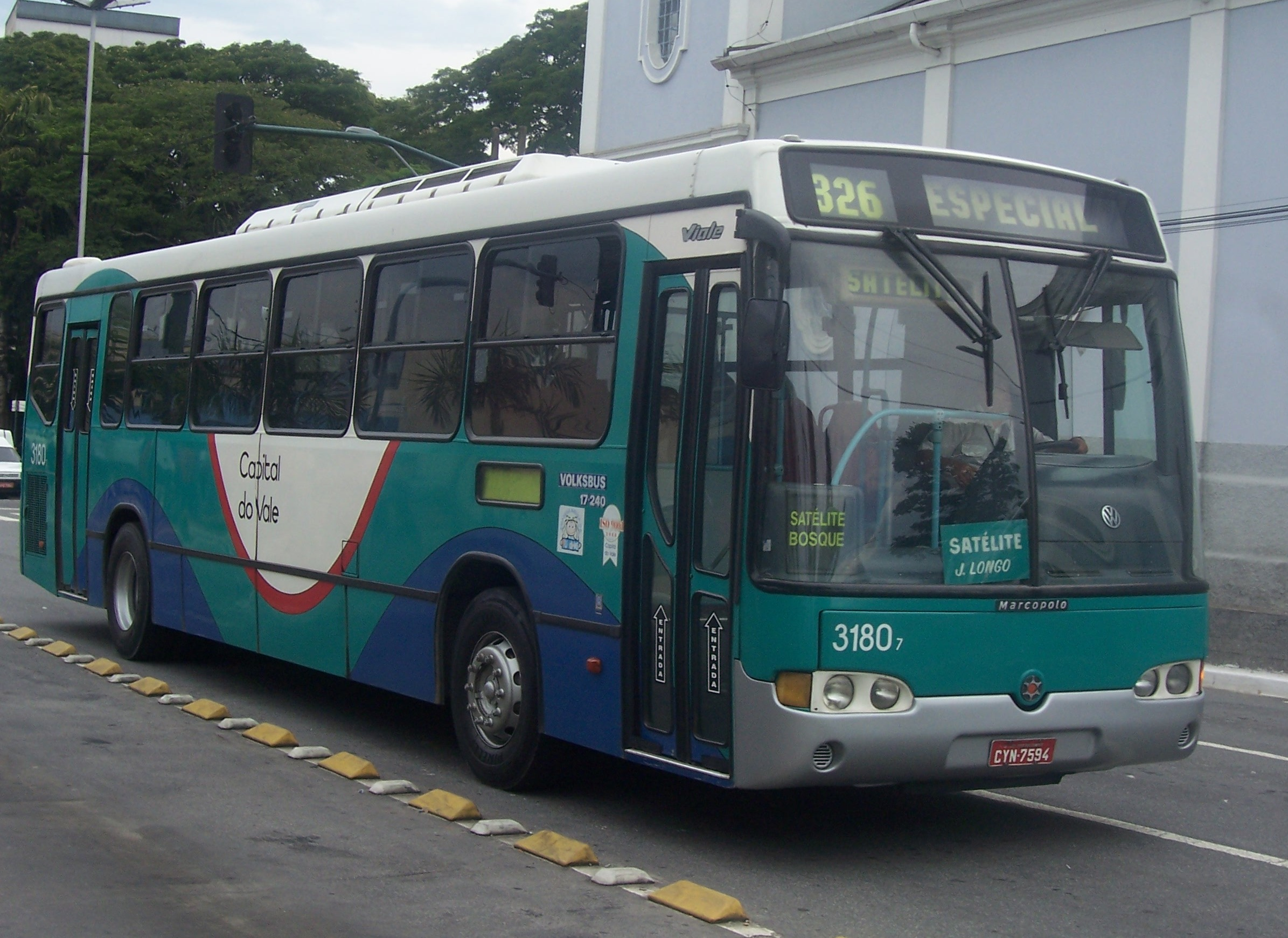
Volksbus 17.240 with a Marcopolo body

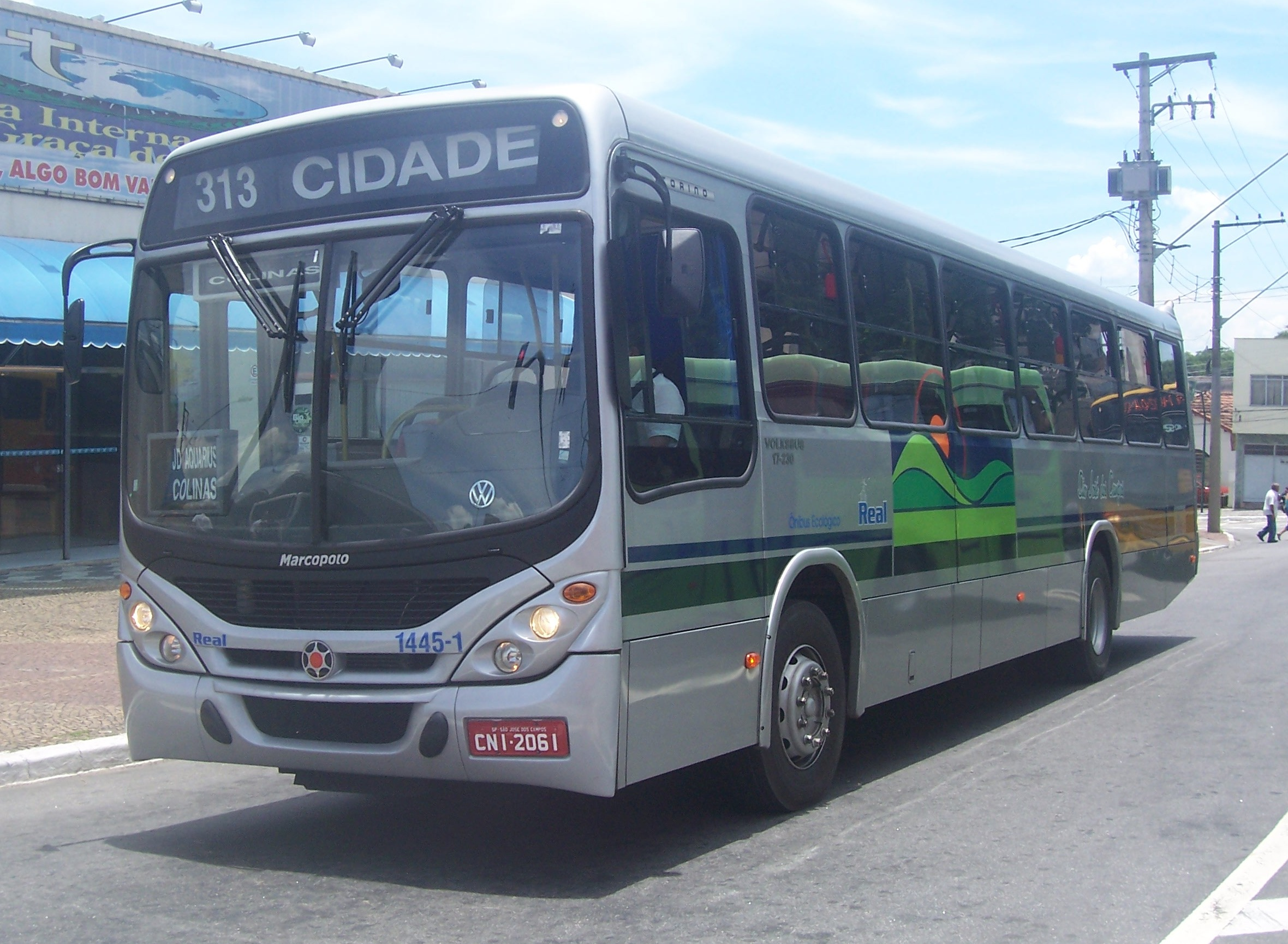
Volksbus 17.230 EOD with a Marcopolo body

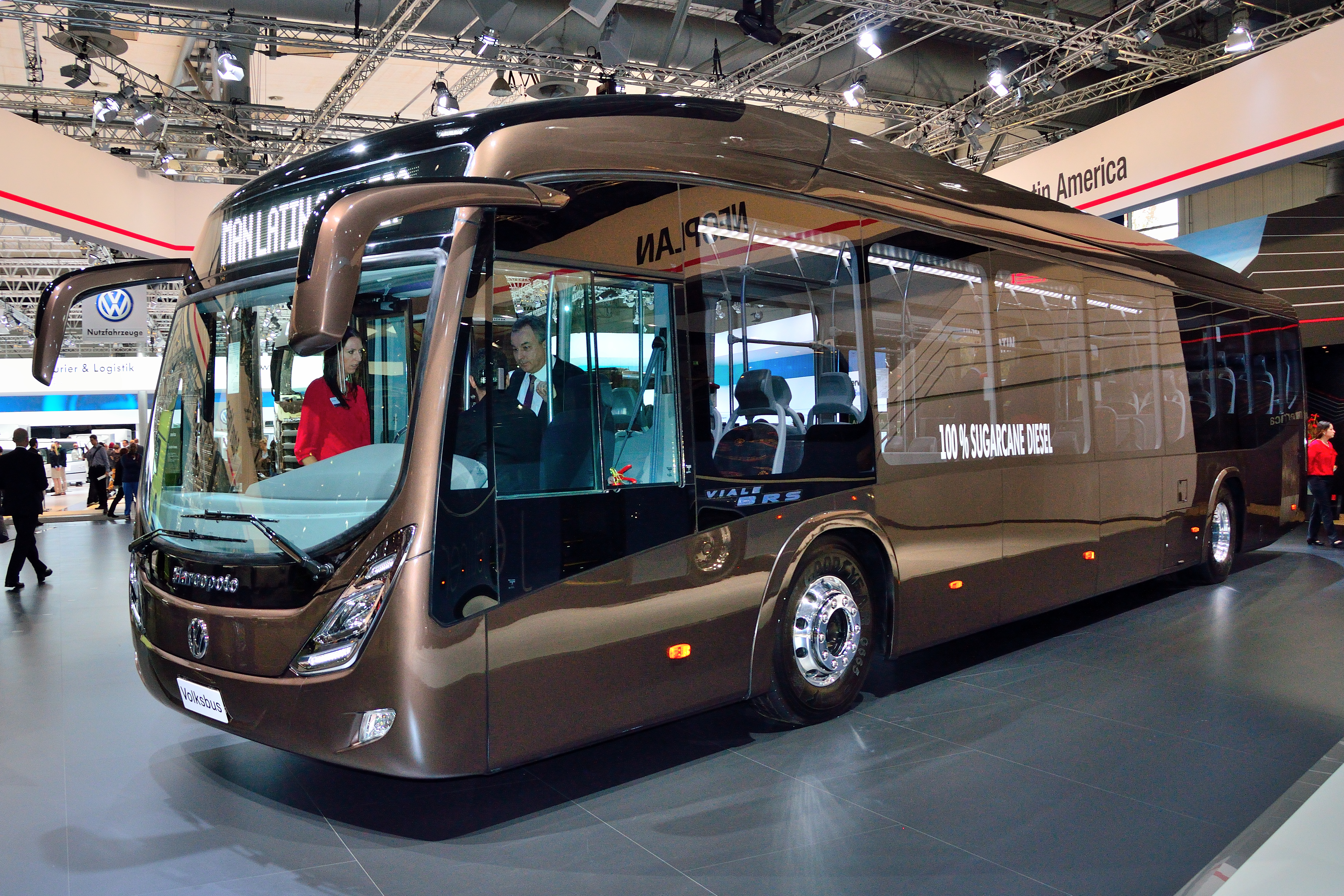
Volksbus 18.280 OT sugarcane-Diesel
