= Volkswagen Constellation =

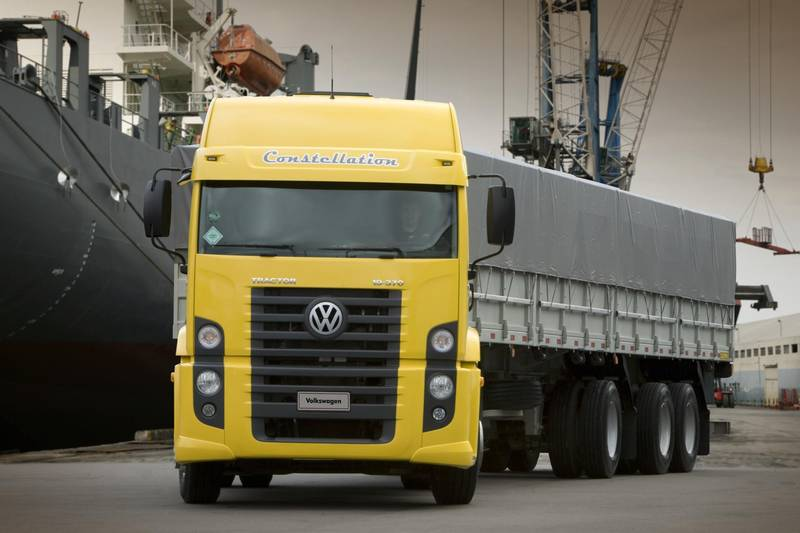

Overview
- Manufacturer: Volkswagen Truck & Bus
- Production: 2005–present
- Assembly: Resende, Brazil; Quezon City, Philippines (MACC)

Body and chassis
- Class: Commercial vehicle - truck
- Body style: Tractor unit, Chassis cab, Flatbed - all "cab-over-engine"

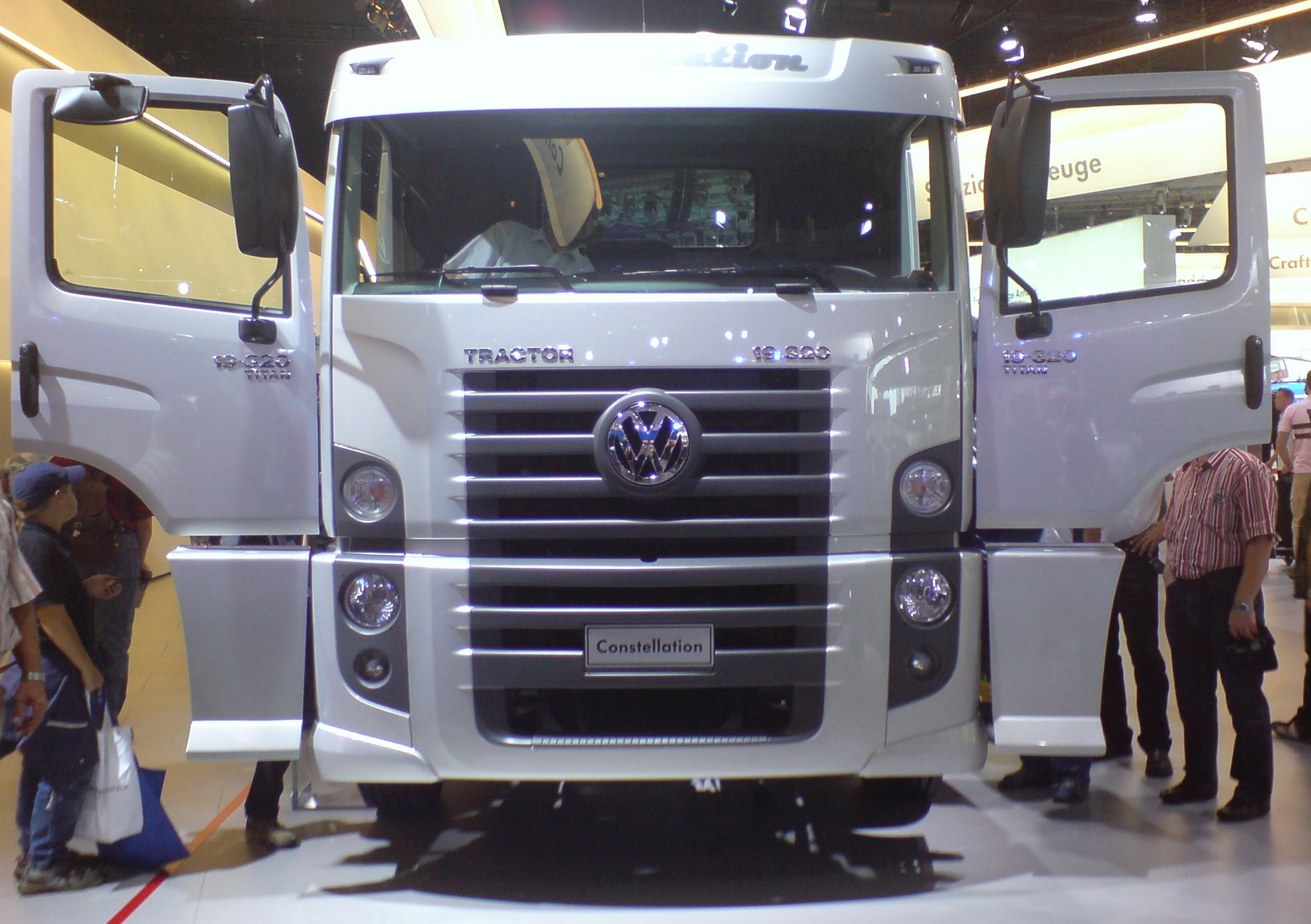
Volkswagen Constellation 19.320 Titan tractor unit, at the 2006 IAA Nutzfahrzeuge (Commercial Vehicles show) in Hannover

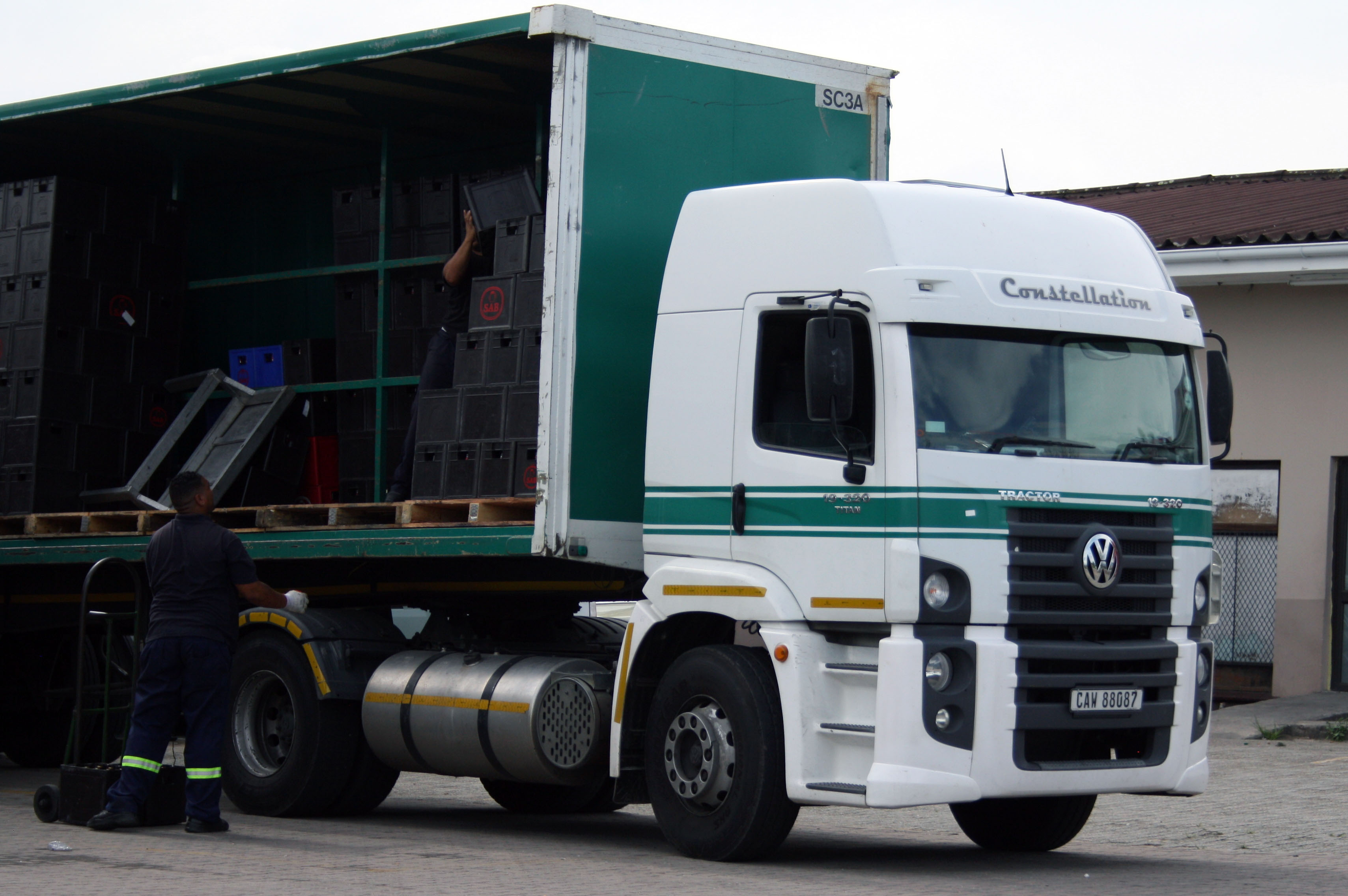
Right-hand drive Volkswagen Constellation 19.320 Titan in South Africa, January 2016

The Volkswagen Constellation is the flagship truck produced by the Brazilian manufacturer Volkswagen Truck & Bus since 2005. The line covering the 13-57 tonne gross combination mass (GCM) segment. It is produced at Resende in Brazil, and is primarily for the South American market.

The truck, a "cab-over-engine" released in September 2005, was designed in Volkswagen's Wolfsburg Design Studio at Volkswagen Group Headquarters, but engineered by Volkswagen Truck and Bus, in Brazil, South Africa, and mainland Europe - on a rigorous 7 million kilometre test phase over a four-year period.

In 2006, Renato Martins won the Brazilian Fórmula Truck Championship in the Constellation's first season racing.

== Variants ==
The cab is available in daycab and sleeper cab configurations.

It is available in the following internal combustion engine / payload configurations: 13.180 and 15.180 with 180 hp (134 kW; 182 PS) MWM International Motores; 17.250, 24.250 6x2 and 19.320 Titan with 250 hp (186 kW; 253 PS) or 320 hp (239 kW; 324 PS) Cummins diesel engines. A further three models were subsequently launched in 2007; a 19.370, 25.370, and 31.370, with a Volkswagen Caminhões e Ônibus engineered and MWM produced 370 hp (276 kW; 375 PS) Volkswagen NGD 370 diesel engine.

== Powertrain ==
=== VW NGD 370 engine ===
The Volkswagen Group NGD 370 turbodiesel engine premiers new attributes for the heavy trucks sector. The high "flat" torque at low engine speeds is improved by a variable geometry turbo-compressor: the Multi Turbo System - MTS. Its cylinder head features four valves per cylinder, displaces 9,354 cubic centimetres (570.8 cu in) (9.4 litres), and generates 367 horsepower (274 kW; 372 PS) at 2,000 rpm. It also comes with the Dual Power Brake – DPB.

It features an exclusive high pressure direct fuel injection similar to the Pumpe Düse (PD) system found in Volkswagen's car engines, the Hydraulic Electronic Unit Injector - HEUI – with electro-hydraulic digital unit injectors and extended durability, developed by the partner company Siemens/VDO. An important advantage is the removable wet cylinder liners which will assist with easier maintenance and lower costs.

Its Multi Turbo System (MTS) turbine with variable vane geometry, is electronically controlled. This helps achieve faster responses, better performance, and better thermal efficiency. This also works as part of the engine brake retarder in the exhaust system. The water-cooled exhaust gas recirculation (EGR) system, coupled with the cylinder block, reutilises part of the exhaust gasses, producing combustion at lower temperatures with less discharge rates.

It includes a new engine brake system, the Dual Power Brake (DPB) fed into the cylinder head, is electronically integrated into the turbocharger. It is claimed that the advantages are: increasing the operational average speed, the brake force, safety, retaking with fuel reduction, and speed on downward slopes. This means less gear shifts, lower maintenance costs, and helps improve the service life of the brakes and tyres.

=== Transmission ===
Clutches on all variants are the hydraulically operated with pneumatic assistance single-plate diaphragm type. All are supplied by ZF Sachs, and range in diameter from 362 millimetres (14.3 in) to 430 millimetres (16.9 in). The engine output is routed through a variety of transmissions. One option is the ZF 16S 1685 TD 16-speed manual synchromesh transmission. This latest ZF box is 80 kilograms (176 lb) lighter than existing models, due to its all-aluminium alloy casings. It has a torque handling capacity of 1,800 newton-metres (1,328 lbf⋅ft).

The 6x2 variants use a Meritor MS 23-185 tractive rear axle, and this has a maximum capacity of 60 tons. It includes a series differential locking system when used on the VW 25.370 tractor unit.

The 6x2 variants also have the facility for partial or total lifting of the third axle, which helps achieve better traction, particularly on slopes. This Extra Traction Device (ETD) ensures part of the third axle load, during partial lifting, is transferred to the tractive axle.

6x4 variants utilise Meritor MD/MR 25-168 tractive rear axles, and are located via Randon S.A. rear suspension (bogie type rigid shafts in tandem).

== Specifications ==
Rigids / Freight Carriers / Tippers
model	engine make / configuration / engine displacement	max. motive power @ rpm	max. torque @ rpm	clutch make, dia (mm)	transmission make / type / speed	rear axle, ratios	wheelbase	GVM (kg) technical capacity	GCM (kg) technical capacity
13.180 (4x2)	MWM 4.12 TCE I4 CR turbo intercooler 4,748 cubic centimetres (289.7 cu in)	132 kW (179 PS; 177 bhp) @ 2,200	600 N⋅m (443 lbf⋅ft) @ 1,550-2,000	ZF Sachs 362	Eaton FS 4205 A manual synchromesh 5-speed	Meritor RS 23-230; 4.88:1 / 6.80:1	4,800 mm (189.0 in); 5,207 mm (205.0 in)	13,200	23,000
15.180 (4x2)	MWM 4.12 TCE I4 CR turbo intercooler 4,748 cubic centimetres (289.7 cu in)	132 kW (179 PS; 177 bhp) @ 2,200	600 N⋅m (443 lbf⋅ft) @ 1,550-2,000	ZF Sachs 362	Eaton FS 4205 A manual synchromesh 5-speed	Meritor RS 23-230; 4.88:1 / 6.80:1	4,800 mm (189.0 in); 5,207 mm (205.0 in)	15,400	23,000
17.250 (4x2)	Cummins ISBe I6 CR turbo intercooler 5,880 cubic centimetres (358.8 cu in)	184 kW (250 PS; 247 bhp) @ 2,500	950 N⋅m (701 lbf⋅ft) @ 1,200-1,700	ZF Sachs 395	Eaton FS 6306 B manual synchromesh 6-speed	Meritor RS 24-240; 4.10:1 / 5.59:1	4,800 mm (189.0 in); 5,207 mm (205.0 in)	17,100	27,000
24.250 (6x2)	Cummins ISBe I6 CR turbo intercooler 5,880 cubic centimetres (358.8 cu in)	184 kW (250 PS; 247 bhp) @ 2,500	950 N⋅m (701 lbf⋅ft) @ 1,200-1,700	ZF Sachs 395	Eaton FS 6306 B manual synchromesh 6-speed	Meritor RS 24-240; 4.10:1 / 5.59:1	6,024 mm (237.2 in); 6,431 mm (253.2 in)	24,100	27,000
26.260 (6x4)	MWM 6.12 TCAE; 7.2 litres (439.4 cu in)	194 kW (264 PS; 260 bhp) @ 2,300	900 N⋅m (664 lbf⋅ft) @ 1,300-1,900	ZF Sachs ??	Eaton RT 7608 LL manual synchromesh 10-speed			26,200	35,000
31.320 (6x4)	Cummins ISCe I6 CR turbo intercooler 8.3 litres (506.5 cu in)	235 kW (320 PS; 315 bhp) @ 2,300	1,288 N⋅m (950 lbf⋅ft) at 1,100-1,600	ZF Sachs ?	ZF 16S ?? manual synchromesh 16-speed			??	63,000
31.370 (6x4)	VW NGD 370; 9,354 cubic centimetres (570.8 cu in)	270 kW (367 PS; 362 bhp) @ 2,000	1,800 N⋅m (1,328 lbf⋅ft) at 1,100-1,500	ZF Sachs 430	ZF 16S 1685 TD manual synchromesh 16-speed			30,000	57,000

Tractor units
model	engine make / configuration / engine displacement	max. motive power @ rpm	max. torque @ rpm	clutch make, dia (mm)	transmission make / type / speed	rear axle, ratios	wheelbase	GVM (kg) technical capacity	GCM (kg) technical capacity
19.320 (4x2) Titan	Cummins ISCe I6 CR turbo intercooler 8,270 cubic centimetres (504.7 cu in)	235 kW (320 PS; 315 bhp) @ 2,000	1,288 N⋅m (950 lbf⋅ft) @ 1,300-1,600	ZF Sachs 430	ZF 16S 221 OD manual synchromesh 16-speed	Meritor RS 23-165; 3.73:1	3,560 mm (140.2 in)	17,100	35,000
19.370 (4x2)	VW NGD 370; 9,354 cubic centimetres (570.8 cu in)	270 kW (367 PS; 362 bhp) @ 2,000	1,800 N⋅m (1,328 lbf⋅ft) @ 1,100-1,500	ZF Sachs 430	ZF 16S 1685 TD manual synchromesh 16-speed			16,800	48,000
25.370 (6x2)	VW NGD 370; 9,354 cubic centimetres (570.8 cu in)	270 kW (367 PS; 362 bhp) @ 2,000	1,800 N⋅m (1,328 lbf⋅ft) @ 1,100-1,500	ZF Sachs 430	ZF 16S 1685 TD manual synchromesh 16-speed			24,100	57,000
31.370 (6x4)	VW NGD 370; 9,354 cubic centimetres (570.8 cu in)	270 kW (367 PS; 362 bhp) @ 2,000	1,800 N⋅m (1,328 lbf⋅ft) @ 1,100-1,500	ZF Sachs 430	ZF 16S 1685 TD manual synchromesh 16-speed			30,000	57,000
