= MWM International Motores =

Brazilian diesel engine manufacturer

International Indústria Automotiva da América do Sul Ltda.
- Formerly: MWM International Indústria de Motores da América do Sul Ltda; MWM Motores Diesel Ltda
- Type: Subsidiary
- Industry: Automotive
- Predecessor: Motoren Werke Mannheim AG
- Founded: 1953, as MWM Motores Diesel Ltda.
- Headquarters: São Paulo, Brazil
- Number of locations: Santo Amaro, São Paulo, Brazil; Canoas, Rio Grande do Sul, Brazil; Jesús María, Province of Córdoba, Argentina
- Area served: Worldwide
- Key people: José Eduardo Luzzi (CEO)
- Products: Diesel engines
- Number of employees: 3,000
- Parent: Tupy S.A.
- Website: MWM International Motores

International Indústria Automotiva da América do Sul Ltda. is a Brazilian company specialised in the manufacturing of diesel engines for automotive applications. Until 2005, it was known as MWM Motores Diesel Ltda.

== History ==
MWM was founded as Motoren Werke Mannheim AG in Germany in 1922 and established its subsidiary in Brazil in 1953 to circumvent harsh import restrictions and high import tax rates. In 1985 parent company MWM was bought by Klöckner-Humboldt-Deutz AG (KHD) and in March 2005 the subsidiary was sold to Navistar International. Now called "MWM International Ind. de Motores da America do Sul Ltda.", has three manufacturing plants: one in Santo Amaro in São Paulo (headquarters), Canoas in Rio Grande do Sul, and Cordoba in Argentina. MWM is said to have a 36% market share for diesel engines, by number of engines produced.

== Engines ==
MWM engines power the local versions of the Chevrolet Grand Blazer, Nissan Xterra and Ford F250 7.3 PSD, among others. MWM diesels were also used to power the locally developed Puma trucks.

There is common confusion between 2.8L MWM Sprint and the 2.8L Powerstroke. The first engine is a MWM project with 3 valves per cylinder and overhead camshaft and the second is an evolution of the Land Rover 2.5L diesel, built under licence by Ioschpe-Maxion (then, International Engines, who merged with MWM).

The MWM Sprint has 3 versions: 2.8L and 3.0L 4-cylinders, and a 6-cylinder 4.2L, all of them high speed engines.

Volkswagen Caminhões e Ônibus have a long relationship with MWM Motores Diesel Ltda. When Volkswagen Trucks and Buses took over Chrysler's Brazilian truck plant in 1980, Volkswagen Group kept the original MWM engines for their new truck ranges. In 1996, Volkswagen Trucks and Buses opened their new Resende plant in Brazil, with the new Modular Consortium system, MWM took charge of the Powertrain line with Resende.

== Technological innovations ==
One technological innovation presented at the congress is the bus equipped with a Diesel + Natural Gas system, strategically displayed to connect Volkswagen Truck and Bus and Delphi Automotive booths. The project was developed by MWM INTERNATIONAL in partnership with these two companies, and is the first diesel-gas system in Brazil. The vehicle is a Volkswagen Truck and Bus, 17 tons, with a 6.10 TCA MWM International engine. The fuel system is electronically controlled to combine diesel and gas.

The bi-fuel is only one of the alternative fuel projects involving MWM International. Another of the company's projects, tests the natural gas + diesel in Acteon 6.12 TCE engine adapted to Otto cycle, and which already presents positive results such as fuel economy and emissions reduction. There are also tests with Biodiesel. In the first semester of 2006, vehicles in this project – a VW 17.210 OD bus equipped with an Acteon electronic engine and two trucks, the VW 8.120 and VW 8.140, exceeded 100,000 kilometers testing.

== Company milestones ==
- 1953 – Start-up of operations in Brazil;
- 1995 – Inauguration of Jesus Maria (Córdoba – Argentina) industrial plant;
- 1995 – Inauguration of Canoas (Rio Grande do Sul – Brazil) industrial plant;
- 2001 – Launching of the 2.8 litre Sprint Electronic 4.07 TCE engine family;
- 2004 – Launching of the 4.12 TCE and 6.12 TCE Acteon electronic engine family;
- 2005 – Launching of the NGD 3.0E electronic engine;
- 2005 – Production of the 3.0 litre 4.08 TCE Sprint engine;
- 2005 – Conformation of MWM INTERNATIONAL Motores as a result of the merger of MWM Motores Diesel and International Engines South America;
- 2005 – MWM (Brazil) was bought by Navistar International in March 2005.
- 2022 - Tupy S.A. announced the acquisition of 100% of the assets of MWM do Brasil.

== See also ==
- Ford Power Stroke engine
