= 2015 Fórmula Truck season =

Fórmula Truck season

2015 Fórmula Truck

Seasons
- ← 2014 2016 →

The 2015 Fórmula Truck season was the 20th Fórmula Truck season. It began on March 1 at Caruaru and ended on December 6 at Londrina.

== Calendar and results ==
On December 7, 2014 – the day of the final race of the 2014 season – the 2015 calendar was announced. All races were held in Brazil.

| Round | | Circuit | Date | Pole position | Fastest lap | Winning driver | Winning team |
|---|---|---|---|---|---|---|---|
| 1 | S1 | Autódromo Internacional Ayrton Senna (Caruaru) | March 1 | Felipe Giaffone | Felipe Giaffone | Felipe Giaffone | MAN Latin America |
| 1 | S2 | Autódromo Internacional Ayrton Senna (Caruaru) | March 1 | Felipe Giaffone | Felipe Giaffone | Felipe Giaffone | MAN Latin America |
| 2 | S1 | Autódromo Internacional Orlando Moura | April 12 | Felipe Giaffone | Leandro Totti | Leandro Totti | RM Competições |
| 2 | S2 | Autódromo Internacional Orlando Moura | April 12 | Leandro Totti | Leandro Totti | Leandro Totti | RM Competições |
| 3 | S1 | Autódromo Internacional Ayrton Senna (Londrina) | May 17 | Felipe Giaffone | Felipe Giaffone | Felipe Giaffone | MAN Latin America |
| 3 | S2 | Autódromo Internacional Ayrton Senna (Londrina) | May 17 | Felipe Giaffone | Leandro Totti | Felipe Giaffone | MAN Latin America |
| 4 | S1 | Velopark | June 14 | Paulo Salustiano | Djalma Fogaça | Paulo Salustiano | ABF Mercedes-Benz |
| 4 | S2 | Velopark | June 14 | Paulo Salustiano | Diogo Pachenki | Paulo Salustiano | ABF Mercedes-Benz |
| 5 | S1 | Autódromo Internacional Ayrton Senna (Goiânia) | July 12 | Leandro Totti | Leandro Totti | Leandro Totti | RM Competições |
| 5 | S2 | Autódromo Internacional Ayrton Senna (Goiânia) | July 12 | Felipe Giaffone | Leandro Totti | Felipe Giaffone | MAN Latin America |
| 6 | S1 | Autódromo Internacional de Santa Cruz do Sul | August 9 | Paulo Salustiano | Paulo Salustiano | Paulo Salustiano | ABF Mercedes-Benz |
| 6 | S2 | Autódromo Internacional de Santa Cruz do Sul | August 9 | Paulo Salustiano | Paulo Salustiano | Paulo Salustiano | ABF Mercedes-Benz |
| 7 | S1 | Autódromo Internacional de Curitiba | September 13 | Felipe Giaffone | Paulo Salustiano | Leandro Totti | RM Competições |
| 7 | S2 | Autódromo Internacional de Curitiba | September 13 | Leandro Totti | Leandro Totti | Leandro Totti | RM Competições |
| 8 | S1 | Autódromo Internacional de Guaporé | October 4 | Djalma Fogaça | André Marques | Wellington Cirino | ABF Mercedes-Benz |
| 8 | S2 | Autódromo Internacional de Guaporé | October 4 | Djalma Fogaça | Djalma Fogaça | Wellington Cirino | ABF Mercedes-Benz |
| 9 | S1 | Autódromo Internacional de Cascavel | November 8 | Felipe Giaffone | Felipe Giaffone | Felipe Giaffone | MAN Latin America |
| 9 | S2 | Autódromo Internacional de Cascavel | November 8 | Felipe Giaffone | David Muffato | Felipe Giaffone | MAN Latin America |
| 10 | S1 | Autódromo Internacional Ayrton Senna (Londrina) | December 6 | Felipe Giaffone | David Muffato | Paulo Salustiano | ABF Mercedes-Benz |
| 10 | S2 | Autódromo Internacional Ayrton Senna (Londrina) | December 6 | Paulo Salustiano | Felipe Giaffone | Paulo Salustiano | ABF Mercedes-Benz |
