= 2016 Fórmula Truck season =

2016 Fórmula Truck

Seasons
- ← 2015 2017 →

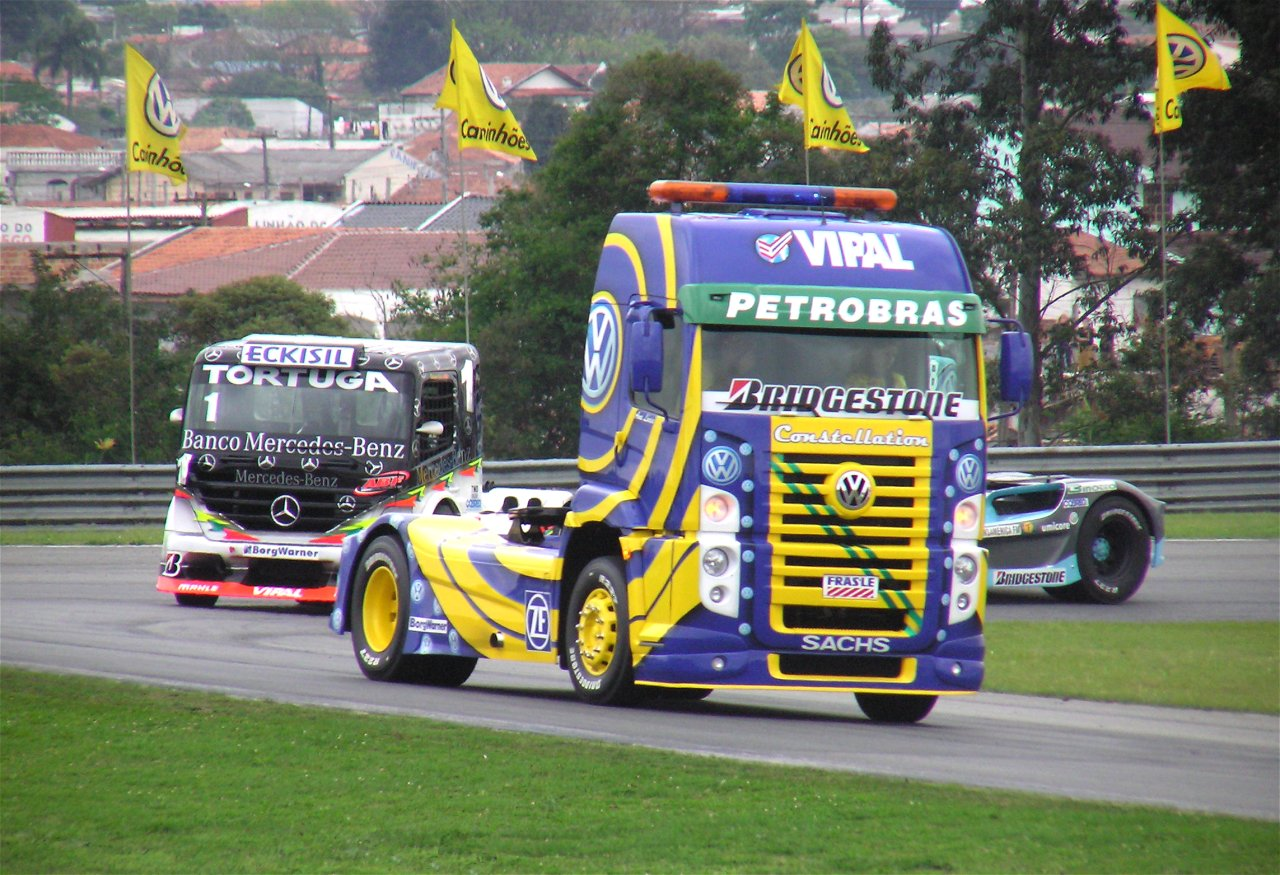
Fórmula Truck 2006 Rd.7 Curitiba: Pace Truck (Volkswagen)

The 2016 Fórmula Truck season was the 21st Fórmula Truck season.

== Teams and drivers ==
All drivers were Brazilian-registered.

Manufacturer	Team	No.	Driver	Rounds
Volvo	Maistro Clay Truck Racing	1	Leandro Totti	All
Volvo	ABF Volvo	30	Rogério Castro	10
Volvo	ABF Volvo	81	Ricardo Sargo	1-3
Volvo	Castropil Racing Team	53	Ronaldo Kastropil	6
Volvo	Boessio Competições	83	Régis Boessio	All
Volvo	ABF Azulim Indy Truck	333	Alex Fabiano	1-7, 9
Ford	DF Motorsport	2	Valmir Benavides	2, 5-6
Ford	DF Motorsport	3	Geraldo Piquet	2-4
Ford	DF Motorsport	25	Jaidson Zini	10
Ford	DF Motorsport	27	Fábio Fogaça	8
Ford	DF Motorsport	47	Duda Bana	10
Ford	DF Motorsport	53	Ronaldo Kastropil	7, 9
Ford	DF Motorsport	72	Djalma Fogaça	3, 5-10
Ford	Fábio Fogaça Motorsport	44	Joel Mendes Júnior	All
Volkswagen	RM Competições	4	Felipe Giaffone	All
Volkswagen	RM Competições	7	Débora Rodrigues	All
Volkswagen	RM Competições	8	Adalberto Jardim	All
Volkswagen	RM Competições	77	André Marques	All
MAN	RM Competições	35	David Muffato	All
Scania	Corinthians Motorsport	15	Roberval Andrade	1-3
Scania	Muffatão Racing	20	Pedro Muffato	2-3, 5-8
Scania	Muffatão Racing	11	Jansen Bueno	2, 8
Mercedes-Benz	ABF Racing Team	21	Raijan Mascarello	All
Mercedes-Benz	ABF Racing Team	30	Rogério Castro	4-7
Mercedes-Benz	ABF Racing Team	33	Gustavo Magnabosco	1-2
Mercedes-Benz	ABF Mercedes-Benz	55	Paulo Salustiano	All
Mercedes-Benz	ABF Mercedes-Benz	60	Wellington Cirino	All
Mercedes-Benz	Copacol Truck Racing	80	Diogo Pachenki	All
Iveco	Lucar Motorsports	88	Beto Monteiro	All
Iveco	Lucar Motorsports	99	Luiz Lopes	All
Iveco	Dakarmotors	10	Jansen Bueno	2
Iveco	Dakarmotors	15	Roberval Andrade	4-10
Iveco	Dakarmotors	25	Jaidson Zini	3
Iveco	Dakarmotors	57	Felipe Tozzo	1

== Calendar and results ==
All races were held in Brazil.

Round		Circuit	Date	Pole position	Fastest lap	Winning driver	Winning team
1	S1	(Rio Grande do Sul) Autódromo Internacional de Santa Cruz do Sul	March 13	Felipe Giaffone	Paulo Salustiano	Felipe Giaffone	RM Competições
1	S2	(Rio Grande do Sul) Autódromo Internacional de Santa Cruz do Sul	March 13		Felipe Giaffone	Felipe Giaffone	RM Competições
2	S1	(Paraná (state)) Autódromo Internacional de Curitiba	April 10	Felipe Giaffone	Felipe Giaffone	Felipe Giaffone	RM Competições
2	S2	(Paraná (state)) Autódromo Internacional de Curitiba	April 10		Felipe Giaffone	Felipe Giaffone	RM Competições
3	S1	(Mato Grosso do Sul) Autódromo Internacional Orlando Moura	May 15	David Muffato	Felipe Giaffone	David Muffato	RM Competições
3	S2	(Mato Grosso do Sul) Autódromo Internacional Orlando Moura	May 15		Felipe Giaffone	Wellington Cirino	ABF Mercedes-Benz
4	S1	(Goiás) Autódromo Internacional Ayrton Senna (Goiânia)	June 5	Paulo Salustiano	Paulo Salustiano	Paulo Salustiano	ABF Mercedes-Benz
4	S2	(Goiás) Autódromo Internacional Ayrton Senna (Goiânia)	June 5		Felipe Giaffone	Paulo Salustiano	ABF Mercedes-Benz
5	S1	(Paraná (state)) Autódromo Internacional Ayrton Senna (Londrina)	July 3	Paulo Salustiano	Felipe Giaffone	Paulo Salustiano	ABF Mercedes-Benz
5	S2	(Paraná (state)) Autódromo Internacional Ayrton Senna (Londrina)	July 3		Felipe Giaffone	Paulo Salustiano	ABF Mercedes-Benz
6	S1	(São Paulo (state)) Autódromo José Carlos Pace	July 31	Paulo Salustiano	André Marques	Paulo Salustiano	ABF Mercedes-Benz
6	S2	(São Paulo (state)) Autódromo José Carlos Pace	July 31		André Marques	Paulo Salustiano	ABF Mercedes-Benz
7	S1	(Rio Grande do Sul) Autódromo Internacional de Tarumã	September 4	Felipe Giaffone	Leandro Totti	Diogo Pachenki	Copacol Truck Racing
7	S2	(Rio Grande do Sul) Autódromo Internacional de Tarumã	September 4		Diogo Pachenki	Felipe Giaffone	Copacol Truck Racing
8	S1	(Paraná (state)) Autódromo Internacional de Cascavel	October 9	André Marques	André Marques	André Marques	RM Competições
9	S1	(Rio Grande do Sul) Autódromo Internacional de Guaporé	November 8	Felipe Giaffone	Wellington Cirino	Felipe Giaffone	RM Competições
10	S1	(Paraná (state)) Autódromo Internacional Ayrton Senna (Londrina)	December 10	Felipe Giaffone	Paulo Salustiano	Felipe Giaffone	RM Competições
10	S2	(Paraná (state)) Autódromo Internacional Ayrton Senna (Londrina)	December 10		Raijan Mascarello	Paulo Salustiano	ABF Mercedes-Benz
