= 2006 Stock Car Brasil season =

Car racing competition

Seasons
- ← 2005 2007 →

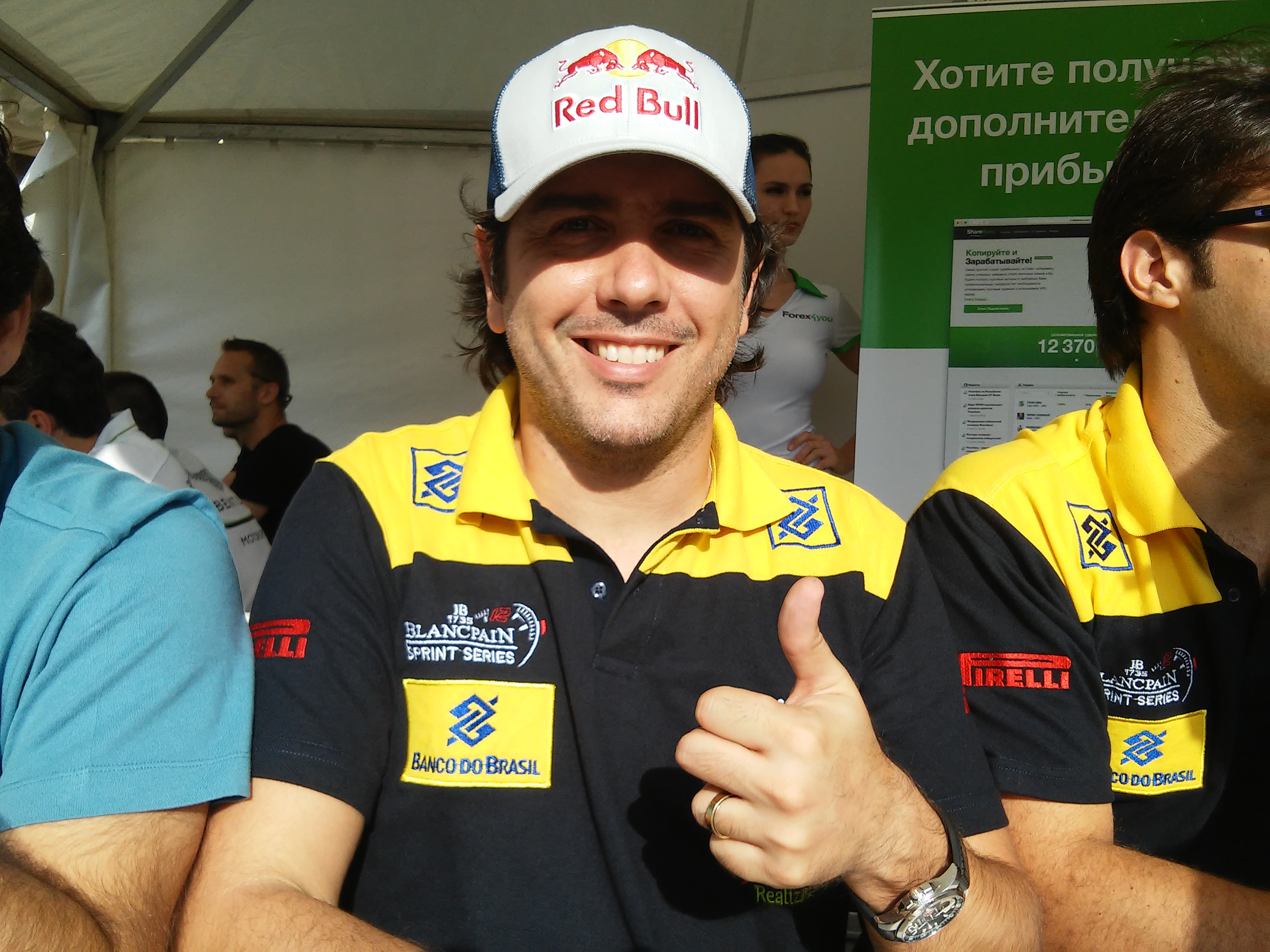
Cacá Bueno was the 2006 champion

The 2006 Stock Car Brasil season (known for commercial reasons as the 2006 Copa Nextel Stock Car season) was the 28th edition of the Stock Car Brasil Championship. The season began at the Interlagos Circuit on April 9 and concluded at the same circuit on December 10. The season was won by Cacá Bueno; winning his first of five Stock Car Brasil championships.

The season was notable for the arrival of Volkswagen as one of the series' manufacturers, alongside Mitsubishi and Chevrolet. The series also introduced a new point system dubbed the Super Final, similar to NASCAR's Chase for the Cup. At the conclusion of the eighth round in Brasília, the top ten placed drivers would be locked in and would compete for the championship across the remaining four rounds. The system would remain in place until the conclusion of the 2011 season.

== Teams and drivers ==
All drivers were Brazilian-registered.

Manufacturer	Vehicle	Team	No.	Driver	Rounds
Chevrolet	Astra	M4T Motorsport	2	Paulo Salustiano	All
Chevrolet	Astra	A. Jardim Competições	5	Adalberto Jardim	1–2
Chevrolet	Astra	Boettger Competições	6	Alceu Feldmann	All
Chevrolet	Astra	Boettger Competições	18	Allam Khodair	All
Chevrolet	Astra	Medley-A.Mattheis	9	Giuliano Losacco	All
Chevrolet	Astra	Medley-A.Mattheis	27	Guto Negãro	All
Chevrolet	Astra	Scuderia 111	11	Nonô Figueiredo	All
Chevrolet	Astra	Scuderia 111	65	Felipe Gama	All
Chevrolet	Astra	L&M Racing	16	Wagner Ebrahim	1–2
Chevrolet	Astra	L&M Racing	26	Wellington Justino	7, 11–12
Chevrolet	Astra	L&M Racing	77	Valdeno Brito	All
Chevrolet	Astra	JF Racing	19	Rodrigo Sperafico	All
Chevrolet	Astra	JF Racing	87	Ruben Fontes	All
Chevrolet	Astra	Vogel Motorsport	21	Thiago Camilo	All
Chevrolet	Astra	Vogel Motorsport	99	Gualter Salles	All
Chevrolet	Astra	RC3 Bassani	25	Renato Jader David	1–4, 7–12
Chevrolet	Astra	RC3 Bassani	26	Wellington Justino	5, 7–8
Chevrolet	Astra	RC3 Bassani	26	Giuliano Piagallo	9
Chevrolet	Astra	RC3 Bassani	34	Matheus Greipel	All
Chevrolet	Astra	RC3 Bassani	55	Christian Fittipaldi	8–12
Chevrolet	Astra	Carreira Racing	40	Fábio Carreira	1–4, 7–12
Chevrolet	Astra	Carreira Racing	79	Marcelo Siqueira	3–4
Chevrolet	Astra	Carreira Racing	80	Luis Carreira, Jr.	1–5
Chevrolet	Astra	PowerTech	41	Hybernon Cysne	All
Chevrolet	Astra	PowerTech	44	Diogo Pachenki	All
Chevrolet	Astra	MT Racing	45	Wanderley Reck, Jr.	1–2
Chevrolet	Astra	Hot Car Competições	47	Geraldo Rola	All
Chevrolet	Astra	Hot Car Competições	74	Popó Bueno	All
Mitsubishi	Lancer Evolution	Eurofarma RC	0	Cacá Bueno	All
Mitsubishi	Lancer Evolution	Eurofarma RC	15	Antonio Jorge Neto	All
Mitsubishi	Lancer Evolution	Katalogo Racing	10	Ruben Carrapatoso	1–9, 11–12
Mitsubishi	Lancer Evolution	Katalogo Racing	63	Lico Kaesemodel	10
Mitsubishi	Lancer Evolution	Katalogo Racing	90	Ricardo Maurício	All
Mitsubishi	Lancer Evolution	AMG-Filipaper Racing	17	Ingo Hoffmann	All
Mitsubishi	Lancer Evolution	Officer ProGP	23	Duda Pamplona	All
Mitsubishi	Lancer Evolution	Nascar Motorsport	28	Juliano Moro	3–12
Mitsubishi	Lancer Evolution	Nascar Motorsport	36	Ricardo Etchenique	1–3
Mitsubishi	Lancer Evolution	Nascar Motorsport	38	Christian Conde	All
Mitsubishi	Lancer Evolution	Terra Avallone	33	Felipe Maluhy	All
Mitsubishi	Lancer Evolution	Terra Avallone	55	Christian Fittipaldi	2–5
Mitsubishi	Lancer Evolution	Terra Avallone	70	Tarso Marques	1, 6–12
Mitsubishi	Lancer Evolution	Tatu Motorsport	37	Alan Chanoski	12
Volkswagen	Bora	WB Motosport	1	Raul Boesel	9–12
Volkswagen	Bora	WB Motosport	3	Chico Serra	All
Volkswagen	Bora	Petrobras-Action Power	7	Thiago Marques	All
Volkswagen	Bora	Petrobras-Action Power	14	Luciano Burti	All
Volkswagen	Bora	Carlos Alves Competições	8	Carlos Alves	All
Volkswagen	Bora	NasrCastroneves	12	Hoover Orsi	1–6, 8–12
Volkswagen	Bora	NasrCastroneves	35	David Muffato	All
Volkswagen	Bora	Sama-GomeSports	22	Marcos Gomes	11
Volkswagen	Bora	Sama-GomeSports	25	Pedro Gomes	All
Volkswagen	Bora	P&B Racing	25	Renato Jader David	6–7
Volkswagen	Bora	P&B Racing	40	Fabio Carreira	6–7
Volkswagen	Bora	RS Competições	46	Rogério Santos	1–2
Volkswagen	Bora	RS Competições	50	Cláudio Ricci	7, 9
Volkswagen	Bora	RS Competições	51	Átila Abreu	10–12
Volkswagen	Bora	RS Competições	72	Júlio Campos	1–3, 8
Volkswagen	Bora	Equipe TekProm	46	Nelson Silva, Jr.	11
Volkswagen	Bora	Equipe TekProm	71	Claudio Capparelli	11–12

== Calendar ==
The following circuits hosted at least one round of the 2006 championship.

Round	Circuit (Event)	Dates	Map
1	(São Paulo (state)) Autódromo José Carlos Pace; São Paulo, São Paulo	7–9 April	2006 Stock Car Brasil season is located in South America
2	(Paraná (state)) Autódromo Internacional de Curitiba; Curitiba, Paraná	28–30 April	2006 Stock Car Brasil season is located in South America
3	Autódromo Internacional Orlando Moura; Campo Grande, Mato Grosso do Sul	19–21 May	2006 Stock Car Brasil season is located in South America
4	(São Paulo (state)) Autódromo José Carlos Pace; São Paulo, São Paulo	1–2 July	2006 Stock Car Brasil season is located in South America
5	(Paraná (state)) Autódromo Internacional Ayrton Senna; Londrina, Paraná	21–23 July	2006 Stock Car Brasil season is located in South America
6	(Paraná (state)) Autódromo Internacional de Curitiba; Curitiba, Paraná	11–13 August	2006 Stock Car Brasil season is located in South America
7	Autódromo Internacional de Santa Cruz do Sul; Santa Cruz do Sul, Rio Grande do Sul	1–3 September	2006 Stock Car Brasil season is located in South America
8	(Federal District (Brazil)) Autódromo Internacional de Brasília; Brasília, Distrito Federal	22–24 September	2006 Stock Car Brasil season is located in South America
9	Autódromo Internacional de Tarumã; Viamão, Rio Grande do Sul	13–15 October	2006 Stock Car Brasil season is located in South America
10	Autódromo Oscar y Juan Gálvez; Buenos Aires, Argentina	27–29 October	2006 Stock Car Brasil season is located in South America
11	(Rio de Janeiro (state)) Autódromo Internacional Nelson Piquet; Jacarepaguá, Rio de Janeiro	17–19 November	2006 Stock Car Brasil season is located in South America
12	(São Paulo (state)) Autódromo José Carlos Pace; São Paulo, São Paulo	8–10 December	2006 Stock Car Brasil season is located in South America

== Results and standings ==
=== Season summary ===
All races were held in Brazil, with the exception of the round at Autódromo Juan y Oscar Gálvez, which was held in Argentina.

Round	Circuit	Date	Pole position	Fastest lap	Winning driver	Winning team
1	(São Paulo (state)) Interlagos	9 April	(Brazil) Felipe Maluhy	(Brazil) Antonio Jorge Neto	(Brazil) Cacá Bueno	Eurofarma RC
2	(Paraná (state)) Curitiba	30 April	(Brazil) Luciano Burti	(Brazil) Felipe Maluhy	(Brazil) Antonio Jorge Neto	Eurofarma RC
3	(Mato Grosso do Sul) Campo Grande	21 May	(Brazil) Cacá Bueno	(Brazil) Hoover Orsi	(Brazil) Cacá Bueno	Eurofarma RC
4	(São Paulo (state)) Interlagos	2 July	(Brazil) David Muffato	(Brazil) Cacá Bueno	(Brazil) Cacá Bueno	Eurofarma RC
5	(Paraná (state)) Londrina	23 July	(Brazil) Cacá Bueno	(Brazil) Antonio Jorge Neto	(Brazil) Cacá Bueno	Eurofarma RC
6	(Paraná (state)) Curitiba	16 August	(Brazil) Thiago Camilo	(Brazil) Juliano Moro	(Brazil) Thiago Camilo	Texaco Vogel
7	(Rio Grande do Sul) Santa Cruz do Sul	3 September	(Brazil) Luciano Burti	(Brazil) Luciano Burti	(Brazil) Ruben Fontes	JF Racing
8	(Federal District (Brazil)) Brasília	24 September	(Brazil) Giuliano Losacco	(Brazil) Giuliano Losacco	(Brazil) Chico Serra	WB Motorsport
Super Final
9	(Rio Grande do Sul) Tarumã	15 October	(Brazil) Giuliano Losacco	(Brazil) Giuliano Losacco	(Brazil) Giuliano Losacco	Medley-A.Mattheis
10	(Argentina) Buenos Aires	29 October	(Brazil) Felipe Maluhy	(Brazil) Mateus Greipel	(Brazil) Ingo Hoffmann	AMG-Filipaper Racing
11	(Rio de Janeiro (state)) Jacarepaguá	19 November	(Brazil) Ricardo Maurício	(Brazil) Valdeno Brito	(Brazil) Tarso Marques	Terra Avallone
12	(São Paulo (state)) Interlagos	10 December	(Brazil) Felipe Maluhy	(Brazil) Gualter Salles	(Brazil) Ingo Hoffmann	AMG-Filipaper Racing

=== Drivers' championship ===
Pos	Driver	(São Paulo (state)) INT1	(Paraná (state)) CUR1	(Mato Grosso do Sul) CAM	(São Paulo (state)) INT2	(Paraná (state)) LON	(Paraná (state)) CUR2	(Rio Grande do Sul) SCS	(Federal District (Brazil)) BRA	(Rio Grande do Sul) TAR	(Argentina) BUE	(Rio de Janeiro (state)) RIO	(São Paulo (state)) INT3	Pts
Super Final
1	(Brazil) Cacá Bueno	1	Ret	**1**	1	**1**	16	3	Ret	5	6	14	8	257
2	(Brazil) Antonio Jorge Neto	9	1	7	DSQ	4	Ret	Ret	Ret	13	Ret	2	2	251
3	(Brazil) Hoover Orsi	2	2	3	4	10	7		3	21	5	3	Ret	248
4	(Brazil) Felipe Maluhy	**4**	18	14	8	8	6	5	8	8	**2**	10	**13**	247
5	(Brazil) Giuliano Losacco	6	3	Ret	24	3	3	8	**22**	**1**	Ret	9	Ret	244
6	(Brazil) Thiago Camilo	8	4	Ret	2	25	**1**	5	4	Ret	7	5	Ret	237
7	(Brazil) Alceu Feldmann	7	7	4	12	11	11	7	13	11	17	9	5	235
8	(Brazil) Guto Negrão	14	10	5	9	12	8	10	Ret	7	22	Ret	3	231
9	(Brazil) Rodrigo Sperafico	3	19	17	23	21	2	2	6	12	32	11	17	223
10	(Brazil) Ricardo Maurício	10	Ret	8	11	6	Ret	6	5	Ret	Ret	**13**	10	216
Super Final cutoff
11	(Brazil) Ingo Hoffmann	5	8	Ret	Ret	22	Ret	14	29	9	1	4	1	93
12	(Brazil) David Muffato	Ret	Ret	2	Ret	Ret	10	13	27	3	8	Ret	11	58
=	(Brazil) Pedro Gomes													58
14	(Brazil) Ruben Fontes	Ret	11	18	Ret	18	12	1	9	14	Ret	11	Ret	55
=	(Brazil) Popó Bueno													55
16	(Brazil) Chico Serra	15	Ret	Ret	10	Ret	DNS	9	1	15	9	DSQ	Ret	47
17	(Brazil) Valdeno Brito													45
18	(Brazil) Flavio Figueiredo													43
19	(Brazil) Duda Pamplona													40
20	(Brazil) Allam Khodair	Ret	Ret	Ret	7	Ret	9	23	10	Ret	28	Ret	6	32
21	(Brazil) Tarso Marques													30
=	(Brazil) Thiago Marques													30
=	(Brazil) Matheus Greipel													30
24	(Brazil) Paulo Salustiano	DNS	Ret	10	5	Ret	13	DNS	Ret	Ret	14	19	Ret	12
25	(Brazil) Luciano Burti													18
26	(Brazil) Diogo Pachenki													10
27	(Brazil) Christian Fittipaldi													9
=	(Brazil) Felipe Gama													9
29	(Brazil) Christian Conde	18	Ret	DNS	15	23	Ret	17	Ret	Ret	10	18	Ret	7
30	(Brazil) Renato David													6
=	(Brazil) Gualter Salles													6
32	(Brazil) Fabio Carreira													5
33	(Brazil) Wanderley Reck Jr.													4
=	(Brazil) Luis Carreira Jr.													4
35	(Brazil) Ricardo Etchenique	13	19	Ret										3
=	(Brazil) Juliano Moro			Ret	Ret	Ret	Ret	22	Ret	14	Ret	23	15	3
=	(Brazil) Mano Rola													3
38	(Brazil) Claudio Capparelli													1
-	(Brazil) Raul Boesel									17	19	20	16	0
-	(Brazil) Alan Chanoski												21	0
Pos	Driver	(São Paulo (state)) INT1	(Paraná (state)) CUR1	(Mato Grosso do Sul) CAM	(São Paulo (state)) INT2	(Paraná (state)) LON	(Paraná (state)) CUR2	(Rio Grande do Sul) SCS	(Federal District (Brazil)) BRA	(Rio Grande do Sul) TAR	(Argentina) BUE	(Rio de Janeiro (state)) RIO	(São Paulo (state)) INT3	Pts

Colour	Result
Gold	Winner
Silver	Second place
Bronze	Third place
Green	Points classification
Blue	Non-points classification
Blue	Non-classified finish (NC)
Purple	Retired, not classified (Ret)
Red	Did not qualify (DNQ)
Red	Did not pre-qualify (DNPQ)
Black	Disqualified (DSQ)
White	Did not start (DNS)
White	Withdrew (WD)
White	Race cancelled (C)
Blank	Did not practice (DNP)
Blank	Did not arrive (DNA)
Blank	Excluded (EX)

**Bold** – Pole
Italics – Fastest Lap
