= 2003 Stock Car Brasil season =

Car racing competition

Seasons
- ← 2002 2004 →

The 2003 Stock Car Brasil season was the 25th edition of the Stock Car Brasil Championship. The season started at the Autódromo Internacional de Curitiba on March 23 with the final race of the season being held at the Interlagos Circuit on November 30.

The championship was won by David Muffato.

== Calendar ==
The following circuits hosted at least one round of the 2003 championship.

Round	Circuit (Event)	Dates	Map
1	(Paraná (state)) Autódromo Internacional de Curitiba; Curitiba, Paraná	21–23 March	2003 Stock Car Brasil season is located in Brazil
2	Autódromo Internacional Orlando Moura; Campo Grande, Mato Grosso do Sul	11–13 April	2003 Stock Car Brasil season is located in Brazil
3	(São Paulo (state)) Autódromo José Carlos Pace; São Paulo, São Paulo	25–27 April	2003 Stock Car Brasil season is located in Brazil
4	(Rio de Janeiro (state)) Autódromo Internacional Nelson Piquet; Jacarepaguá, Rio de Janeiro	23–25 May	2003 Stock Car Brasil season is located in Brazil
5	(Paraná (state)) Autódromo Internacional Ayrton Senna; Londrina, Paraná	13–15 June	2003 Stock Car Brasil season is located in Brazil
6	(São Paulo (state)) Autódromo José Carlos Pace; São Paulo, São Paulo	11–13 July	2003 Stock Car Brasil season is located in Brazil
7	(Paraná (state)) Autódromo Internacional de Curitiba; Curitiba, Paraná	15–17 August	2003 Stock Car Brasil season is located in Brazil
8	Autódromo Internacional Orlando Moura; Campo Grande, Mato Grosso do Sul	5–7 September	2003 Stock Car Brasil season is located in Brazil
9	(Rio de Janeiro (state)) Autódromo Internacional Nelson Piquet; Jacarepaguá, Rio de Janeiro	26–28 September	2003 Stock Car Brasil season is located in Brazil
10	(Federal District (Brazil)) Autódromo Internacional de Brasília; Brasília, Distrito Federal	17–19 October	2003 Stock Car Brasil season is located in Brazil
11	(Paraná (state)) Autódromo Internacional de Curitiba; Curitiba, Paraná	7–9 November	2003 Stock Car Brasil season is located in Brazil
12	(São Paulo (state)) Autódromo José Carlos Pace; São Paulo, São Paulo	28–30 November	2003 Stock Car Brasil season is located in Brazil

== Teams and drivers ==
All cars used Chevrolet Vectra Stock Car chassis. All drivers were Brazilian-registered.

Team	No.	Driver	Rounds
RS Competições	0	Cacá Bueno	All
RS Competições	4	Popó Bueno	All
JF-Filipaper Racing	1	Ingo Hoffmann	All
JF-Filipaper Racing	10	Sandro Tannuri	All
Samsung-Start	2	Neto de Nigris	All
WB Motorsport	3	Chico Serra	All
WB Motorsport	6	Alceu Feldmann	All
A. Jardim Competições	5	Adalberto Jardim	All
Petrobras-Action Power	7	Thiago Marques	1–3, 5–12
Carlos Alves Competições	8	Carlos Alves	All
Medley-A.Mattheis	9	Xandy Negrão	4, 6–7, 9, 12
Medley-A.Mattheis	15	Antonio Jorge Neto	All
Medley-A.Mattheis	27	Guto Negrão	All
Scuderia 111	11	Nonô Figueiredo	All
Vogel Motorsport	13	André Bragantini Jr.	All
Vogel Motorsport	99	Gualter Salles	All
Scuderia Lobo	21	Thiago Camilo	All
Manzini Competições	22	Paulo Gomes	9–12
Manzini Competições	88	Beto Giorgi	7–8
Itupetro-RC	9	Giuliano Losacco	All
Itupetro-RC	25	Ricardo Etchenique	10
Itupetro-RC	25	Luiz Paternostro	1–9, 11
Katalogo Racing	32	Paulo Yamamoto	12
Katalogo Racing	37	Fernando Correa	1–4, 6–12
Katalogo Racing	73	Claudio Capparelli	2–3
Katalogo Racing	88	Beto Giorgi	1–6
NASCAR Racing	33	Ricardo Etchenique	1–2, 6
NASCAR Racing	72	Hélio Saraiva Jr.	1–3, 5–6
NASCAR Racing	77	Aloysio de Andrade	All
NASCAR Racing	88	Beto Giorgi	9–12
Famossul Motorsport	34	Matheus Greipel	All
Boettger Competições	35	David Muffato	1–5, 7–12
Boettger Competições	35	Felipe Maluhy	6
Boettger Competições	36	Raul Boesel	All
Giaffone Motorsport	43	Pedro Gomes	All
Giaffone Motorsport	44	André Giaffone	All
Massageol-Hot Car	45	Giuseppe Vecci	All
Salmini Racing	56	Sérgio Paese	All
Salmini Racing	57	Rodney Felicio	1, 3, 5–6, 9–12
Salmini Racing	57	Paulo Yamamoto	8
Bassani Racing	74	Duda Pamplona	All

== Results and standings ==
=== Season summary ===
Round	Circuit	Date	Pole position	Fastest lap	Winning driver	Winning team
1	(Paraná (state)) Curitiba	21–23 March	(Brazil) Giuliano Losacco	(Brazil) David Muffato	(Brazil) Ingo Hoffmann	JF-Filipaper Racing
2	(Mato Grosso do Sul) Campo Grande	11–13 April	(Brazil) Raul Boesel	(Brazil) Antonio Jorge Neto	(Brazil) David Muffato	Boettger Competições
3	(São Paulo (state)) Interlagos	25–27 April	(Brazil) Cacá Bueno	(Brazil) Ingo Hoffmann	(Brazil) David Muffato	Boettger Competições
4	(Rio de Janeiro (state)) Jacarepaguá	23–25 May	(Brazil) Xandy Negrão	(Brazil) Xandy Negrão	(Brazil) David Muffato	Boettger Competições
5	(Paraná (state)) Londrina	13–15 June	(Brazil) Duda Pamplona	(Brazil) Guto Negrão	(Brazil) Nonô Figueiredo	Scuderia 111
6	(São Paulo (state)) Interlagos	11–13 July	(Brazil) Giuliano Losacco	(Brazil) Antonio Jorge Neto	(Brazil) Giuliano Losacco	Itupetro-RC
7	(Paraná (state)) Curitiba	15–17 August	(Brazil) Guto Negrão	(Brazil) Antonio Jorge Neto	(Brazil) Guto Negrão	Medley-A.Mattheis
8	(Mato Grosso do Sul) Campo Grande	5–7 September	(Brazil) David Muffato	(Brazil) Giuliano Losacco	(Brazil) David Muffato	Boettger Competições
9	(Rio de Janeiro (state)) Jacarepaguá	26–28 September	(Brazil) Cacá Bueno	(Brazil) Ingo Hoffmann	(Brazil) Cacá Bueno	Petrobras-RS
10	(Federal District (Brazil)) Brasília	17–19 October	(Brazil) André Bragantini	(Brazil) André Bragantini	(Brazil) Antonio Jorge Neto	Medley-A.Mattheis
11	(Paraná (state)) Curitiba	7–9 November	(Brazil) Raul Boesel	(Brazil) Antonio Jorge Neto	(Brazil) Guto Negrão	Medley-A.Mattheis
12	(São Paulo (state)) Interlagos	28–30 November	(Brazil) Antonio Jorge Neto	(Brazil) Cacá Bueno	(Brazil) Chico Serra	WB Motorsport

=== Standings ===
Pos	Driver	(Paraná (state)) CUR1	(Mato Grosso do Sul) CAM1	(São Paulo (state)) INT1	(Rio de Janeiro (state)) RIO1	(Paraná (state)) LON	(São Paulo (state)) INT2	(Paraná (state)) CUR2	(Mato Grosso do Sul) CAM2	(Rio de Janeiro (state)) RIO2	(Federal District (Brazil)) BRA	(Paraná (state)) CUR3	(São Paulo (state)) INT3	Pts
1	(Brazil) David Muffato	Ret	1	1	1	DSQ		8	1	2	6	Ret	4	152
2	(Brazil) Cacá Bueno	3	15	3	14	9	15	3	2	1	11	3	3	139
3	(Brazil) Guto Negrão	4	14	Ret	8	Ret	2	1	3	DNS	3	1	5	138
4	(Brazil) Ingo Hoffmann	1	5	2	7	2	9	10	DNS	Ret	5	5	Ret	123
5	(Brazil) Antonio Jorge Neto	Ret	Ret	Ret	5	4	Ret	2	4	9	1	6	2	122
6	(Brazil) Chico Serra	Ret	4	5	11	3	DNS	Ret	9	5	4	Ret	1	105
7	(Brazil) Raul Boesel	Ret	2	23	10	DNS	6	4	5	7	10	4	6	101
8	(Brazil) Giuliano Losacco	2	Ret	8	Ret	Ret	1	Ret	6	Ret	2	13	7	95
9	(Brazil) Carlos Alves	8	11	10	4	6	4	9	Ret	Ret	16	2	9	91
10	(Brazil) Pedro Gomes	9	9	11	Ret	Ret	10	6	8	4	8	Ret	8	73
11	(Brazil) Nonô Figueiredo	Ret	20	18	16	1	3	5	10	11	Ret	DNS	Ret	64
12	(Brazil) Gualter Salles	Ret	3	4	20	Ret	Ret	7	DNS	Ret	9	7	13	58
13	(Brazil) Duda Pamplona	11	7	Ret	3	Ret	5	DNS	Ret	17	Ret	Ret	12	46
14	(Brazil) Alceu Feldmann	DSQ	Ret	17	12	Ret	12	11	Ret	3	7	14	Ret	40
15	(Brazil) Sandro Tannuri	DNS	Ret	9	2	13	Ret	13	Ret	Ret	18	11	15	39
16	(Brazil) Adalberto Jardim	Ret	12	7	9	Ret	8	Ret	Ret	6	Ret	Ret	Ret	38
17	(Brazil) Thiago Camilo	7	Ret	6	17	7	Ret	Ret	Ret	DNS	Ret	Ret	10	34
18	(Brazil) André Giaffone	Ret	6	16	6	5	Ret	Ret	Ret	Ret	Ret	15	16	33
19	(Brazil) Thiago Marques	10	10	Ret		14	Ret	18	13	8	12	Ret	17	29
20	(Brazil) Matheus Greipel	Ret	18	Ret		8	13	Ret	11	13	15	9	18	27
21	(Brazil) Popó Bueno	12	Ret	13	Ret	10	Ret	12	Ret	12	Ret	DNS	11	26
22	(Brazil) Sérgio Paese	DNS	8	14	18		Ret	Ret	7	Ret	Ret	DNS	Ret	19
23	(Brazil) Luiz Paternostro	6	17	12	Ret	Ret	16	Ret	12	Ret		Ret		18
24	(Brazil) Xandy Negrão				21		7	Ret		10			Ret	15
25	(Brazil) André Bragantini Jr.	Ret	Ret	Ret	Ret	Ret	Ret	Ret	DNS	Ret	13	8	14	13
=	(Brazil) Aloysio Andrade Filho	5	Ret	Ret	Ret	Ret	Ret	15	Ret	DNS	Ret	Ret	Ret	13
27	(Brazil) Neto de Nigris	DNS	Ret	19	15	Ret	14	14	15	Ret	Ret	10	21	12
28	(Brazil) Ricardo Etchenique	Ret	13				11				14			10
29	(Brazil) Rodney Felício	13		20		11	Ret			15	20	Ret	Ret	9
30	(Brazil) Fernando Correa	Ret	Ret	22		12	Ret	17	16	Ret	17	12	20	8
31	(Brazil) Beto Giorgi	Ret	16	Ret	13	Ret	Ret	Ret	Ret	Ret	Ret	Ret	22	3
32	(Brazil) Giuseppe Vecci	Ret	19	21	19	Ret	Ret	16	14	16	Ret	Ret	Ret	2
=	(Brazil) Paulo Gomes									14	19	Ret	19	2
34	(Brazil) Hélio Saraiva Jr.	Ret	DNS	Ret		15	17							1
=	(Brazil) Cláudio Capparelli		Ret	15										1
-	(Brazil) Felipe Maluhy						Ret							0
-	(Brazil) Paulo Yamamoto								Ret				Ret	0
Pos	Driver	(Paraná (state)) CUR1	(Mato Grosso do Sul) CAM1	(São Paulo (state)) INT1	(Rio de Janeiro (state)) RIO1	(Paraná (state)) LON	(São Paulo (state)) INT2	(Paraná (state)) CUR2	(Mato Grosso do Sul) CAM2	(Rio de Janeiro (state)) RIO2	(Federal District (Brazil)) BRA	(Paraná (state)) CUR3	(São Paulo (state)) INT3	Pts
