= 2007 Stock Car Brasil season =

Seasons
- ← 2006 2008 →

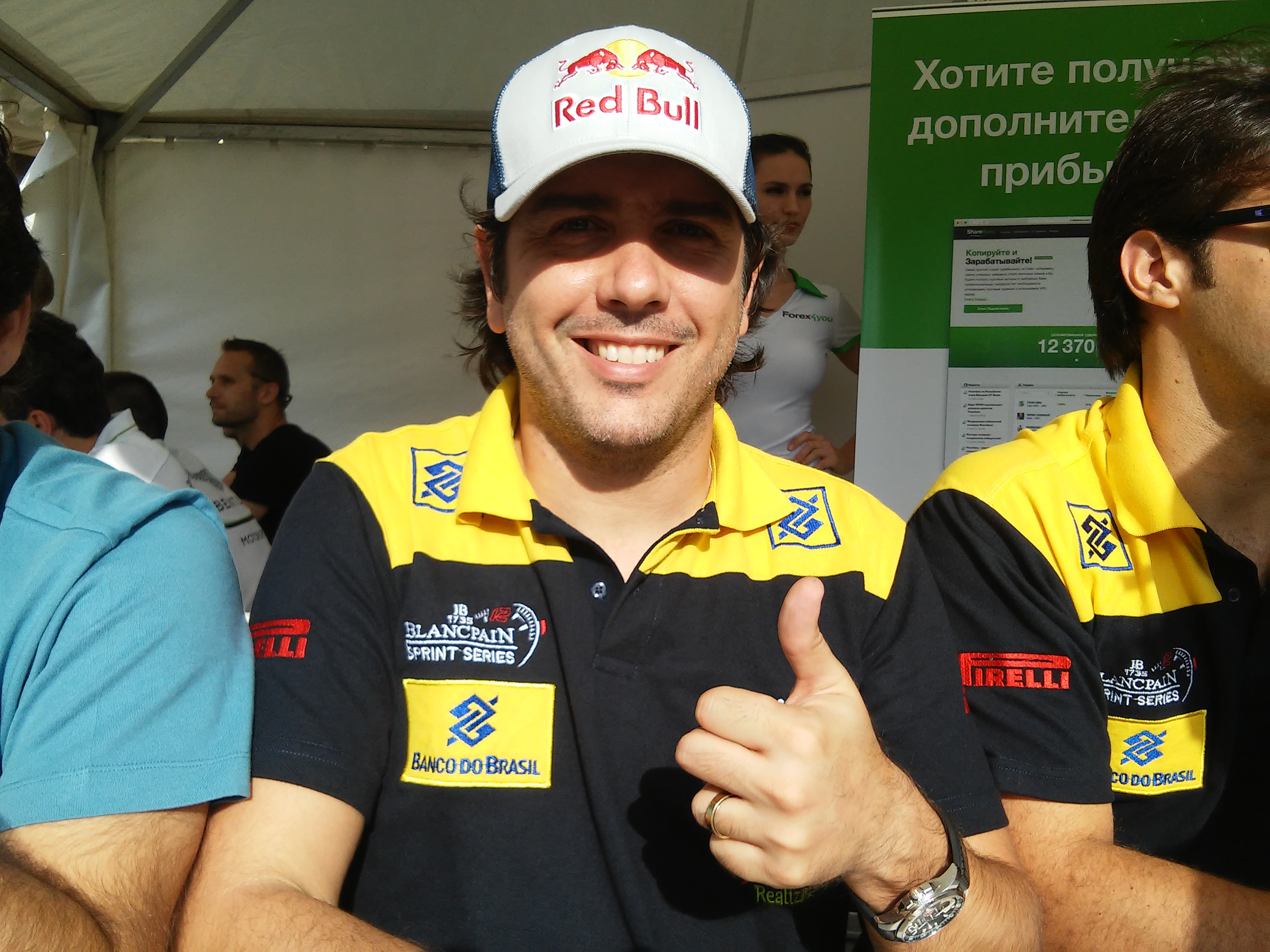
Cacá Bueno was the 2007 champion

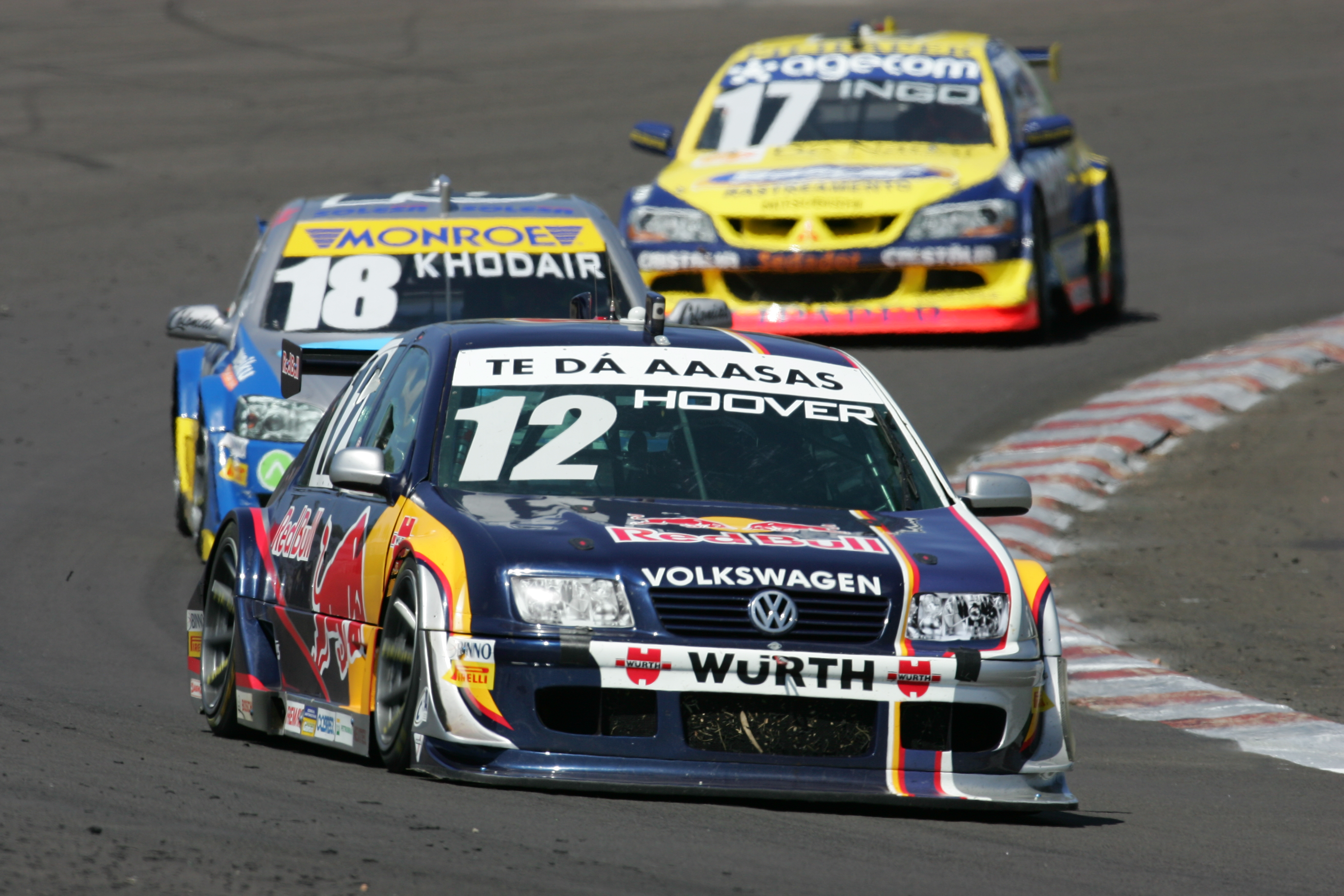
Hoover Orsi leading from Allam Khodair and Ingo Hoffmann

The 2007 Stock Car Brasil season (known for commercial reasons as the 2007 Copa Nextel Stock Car season) was the 29th edition of the Stock Car Brasil Championship. It began on April 22 at the Interlagos and ended on December 9 at the same circuit, after twelve rounds.

== Teams and drivers ==
All drivers were Brazilian-registered.

Team	Car	No.	Driver	Rounds
Eurofarma RC	Mitsubishi Lancer Evolution	0	Cacá Bueno	All
Eurofarma RC	Mitsubishi Lancer Evolution	15	Antonio Jorge Neto	All
RS Competições	Volkswagen Bora	1	Antônio Pizzonia	5–12
RS Competições	Volkswagen Bora	25	Renato Jader David	5-8
RS Competições	Volkswagen Bora	30	Cláudio Ricci	9–12
RS Competições	Volkswagen Bora	35	David Muffato	1–2
RS Competições	Volkswagen Bora	47	Geraldo Rola	1–2
M4T Motorsport	Chevrolet Astra	2	Paulo Salustiano	All
M4T Motorsport	Chevrolet Astra	34	Matheus Greipel	5–12
Full Time Sports	Peugeot 307	3	Chico Serra	All
Full Time Sports	Peugeot 307	47	Daniel Landi	All
Hot Car Competições	Chevrolet Astra	4	Fabio Carreira	All
Hot Car Competições	Chevrolet Astra	74	Popó Bueno	All
Carlos Alves Competições	Volkswagen Bora	5	Gualter Salles	9–11
Carlos Alves Competições	Volkswagen Bora	8	Carlos Alves	All
Carlos Alves Competições	Volkswagen Bora	55	Nelson Silva, Jr.	12
Scuderia 111	Chevrolet Astra	5	Gualter Salles	1–6
Scuderia 111	Chevrolet Astra	46	Rafael Daniel	7–8
Scuderia 111	Chevrolet Astra	65	Felipe Gama	1–5, 7–8
Boettger Competições	Chevrolet Astra	6	Alceu Feldmann	All
Boettger Competições	Chevrolet Astra	18	Allam Khodair	All
Cimed-Action Power	Volkswagen Bora	7	Thiago Marques	All
Cimed-Action Power	Volkswagen Bora	14	Luciano Burti	All
Texaco Vogel	Chevrolet Astra	9	Giuliano Losacco	All
Texaco Vogel	Chevrolet Astra	21	Thiago Camilo	All
Katalogo Racing	Mitsubishi Lancer Evolution	10	Ruben Carrapatoso	All
Katalogo Racing	Mitsubishi Lancer Evolution	24	Allan Hellmeister	All
Officer Motorsport	Mitsubishi Lancer Evolution	11	Nonô Figueiredo	All
Officer Motorsport	Mitsubishi Lancer Evolution	23	Duda Pamplona	All
Red Bull Racing	Volkswagen Bora	12	Hoover Orsi	All
Red Bull Racing	Volkswagen Bora	29	Daniel Serra	All
Biosintetica-Action Power	Volkswagen Bora	16	Enrique Bernoldi	All
Biosintetica-Action Power	Volkswagen Bora	19	Rodrigo Sperafico	All
AMG Motorsport	Mitsubishi Lancer Evolution	17	Ingo Hoffmann	All
AMG Motorsport	Mitsubishi Lancer Evolution	63	Lico Kaesemodel	All
Vivanz-WA Mattheis	Peugeot 307	20	Ricardo Sperafico	All
Vivanz-WA Mattheis	Peugeot 307	27	Guto Negão	All
PowerTech	Chevrolet Astra	25	Renato Jader David	9
PowerTech	Chevrolet Astra	26	Wellington Justino	1–3
PowerTech	Chevrolet Astra	40	Diogo Pachenki	6–12
PowerTech	Chevrolet Astra	41	Hybernon Cysne	1–4, 6–8, 10–12
Sama-GomeSports	Volkswagen Bora	22	Paulo Gomes	7
Sama-GomeSports	Volkswagen Bora	25	Renato Jader David	4
Sama-GomeSports	Volkswagen Bora	55	Angelo Serafim	8–9
Sama-GomeSports	Volkswagen Bora	27	Matheus Greipel	1–4
Sama-GomeSports	Volkswagen Bora	51	Atila Abreu	6–8
Sama-GomeSports	Volkswagen Bora	72	Júlio Campos	1–3, 5
RC3 Bassani	Peugeot 307	25	Renato Jader David	1–3
RC3 Bassani	Peugeot 307	35	David Muffato	3–12
RC3 Bassani	Peugeot 307	50	Thiago Medeiros	4–12
RC3 Bassani	Peugeot 307	64	Nelson Merlo	1–2
Nascar Motorsport	Mitsubishi Lancer Evolution	28	Juliano Moro	All
Nascar Motorsport	Mitsubishi Lancer Evolution	38	Christian Conde	All
RCM Motorsport	Mitsubishi Lancer Evolution	31	William Starostik	All
RCM Motorsport	Mitsubishi Lancer Evolution	49	Galid Osman	12
RCM Motorsport	Mitsubishi Lancer Evolution	72	Júlio Campos	10
RCM Motorsport	Mitsubishi Lancer Evolution	91	Aldo Piedade, Jr.	7–9
Terra Avallone	Mitsubishi Lancer Evolution	33	Felipe Maluhy	All
Terra Avallone	Mitsubishi Lancer Evolution	70	Tarso Marques	All
Tatu Motorsport	Mitsubishi Lancer Evolution	36	José Cordova	1–4, 6–8
Tatu Motorsport	Mitsubishi Lancer Evolution	37	Alan Chanoski	1–5, 7
Tatu Motorsport	Mitsubishi Lancer Evolution	88	Beto Giorgi	11–12
L&M Racing	Peugeot 307	42	Ricardo Zonta	All
L&M Racing	Peugeot 307	43	Pedro Gomes	All
WB Motosport	Volkswagen Bora	48	Danilo Dirani	4
WB Motosport	Volkswagen Bora	50	Thiago Medeiros	1–3
JF Racing	Peugeot 307	77	Valdeno Brito	All
JF Racing	Peugeot 307	87	Ruben Fontes	All
Medley-A.Mattheis	Chevrolet Astra	80	Marcos Gomes	All
Medley-A.Mattheis	Chevrolet Astra	90	Ricardo Maurício	All

== Race calendar and results ==
All races were held in Brazil, excepting the round at Autódromo Juan y Oscar Gálvez, which held in Argentina.

Round	Circuit	Date	Pole position	Fastest lap	Winning driver	Winning team
1	Autódromo José Carlos Pace	April 22	Daniel Serra	Daniel Serra	Ricardo Mauricio	Medley-A.Mattheis
2	Autódromo Internacional de Curitiba	May 6	Rodrigo Sperafico	Cacá Bueno	Rodrigo Sperafico	Action Power
3	Autódromo Internacional Orlando Moura	June 3	Tarso Marques	Thiago Camilo	Tarso Marques	Terra Avallone
4	Autódromo José Carlos Pace	June 17	Antonio Jorge Neto	Thiago Camilo	Antonio Jorge Neto	Eurofarma RC
5	Autódromo Internacional Ayrton Senna	July 29	Thiago Camilo	Thiago Camilo	Thiago Camilo	Texaco Vogel
6	Autódromo Internacional de Santa Cruz do Sul	August 19	Rodrigo Sperafico	Nono Figueiredo	Cacá Bueno	Eurofarma RC
7	Autódromo Internacional de Curitiba	September 8	Pedro Gomes	Pedro Gomes	Cacá Bueno	Eurofarma RC
8	Autódromo Internacional Nelson Piquet	September 23	Valdeno Brito	Ricardo Zonta	Hoover Orsi	Red Bull Racing
Super Final
9	Autódromo Juan y Oscar Gálvez	October 14	Ricardo Sperafico	Valdeno Brito	Cacá Bueno	Eurofarma RC
10	Autódromo Internacional de Tarumã	October 28	Rodrigo Sperafico	Pedro Gomes	Rodrigo Sperafico	Action Power
11	Autódromo Internacional Nelson Piquet	November 25	Ricardo Sperafico	Duda Pamplona	Duda Pamplona	Officer Motorsport
12	Autódromo José Carlos Pace	December 9	Thiago Camilo	Popó Bueno	Marcos Gomes	Medley-A.Mattheis

=== Drivers' championship ===
Pos	Driver	INT	CUR	CAM	INT	LON	SCS	CUR	BRA	ARG	TAR	RIO	INT	Pts
Super Final
1	Cacá Bueno	7	Ret	4	2	4	1	1	26	1	2	10	Ret	278
2	Rodrigo Sperafico	10	**1**	18	10	11	**13**	15	Ret	6	**1**	7	4	265
3	Thiago Camilo	23	2	2	5	1	Ret	DSQ	8	2	6	Ret	**26**	247
4	Marcos Gomes	Ret	Ret	3	3	31	7	3	11	14	17	16	1	240
4	Felipe Maluhy	2	11	27	7	16	6	18	17	5	8	9	10	240
6	Ingo Hoffmann	5	12	5	4	7	Ret	13	2	11	13	5	11	239
7	Valdeno Brito	24	20	Ret	13	2	4	4	**Ret**	14	Ret	11	2	237
8	Daniel Serra	**3**	5	7	Ret	30	Ret	12	7	10	15	24	9	223
9	Ricardo Maurício	1	Ret	6	6	3	5	2	Ret	Ret	16	Ret	Ret	221
10	Hoover Orsi	4	19	23	9	28	Ret	22	1	17	14	21	Ret	219
Super Final cutoff
11	Antonio Jorge Neto	Ret	8	14	**1**	20	10	Ret	Ret	Ret	10	18	3	71
12	Duda Pamplona	21	4	29	24	12	22	12	Ret	Ret	3	1	Ret	66
13	Enrique Bernoldi	DNQ	15	22	Ret	Ret	3	Ret	3	4	Ret	14	7	58
14	Ricardo Sperafico	Ret	Ret	30	19	17	13	9	4	**Ret**	5	**2**	DNQ	56
15	Ruben Fontes	6	16	8	12	8	20	Ret	16	7	26	4	Ret	53
15	Alceu Feldmann	11	7	17	14	24	Ret	5	10	12	10	17	5	53
17	Luciano Burti	14	7	9	Ret	Ret	2	21	24	27	9	Ret	Ret	45
18	Popó Bueno	15	Ret	13	Ret	19	9	8	20	3	11	Ret	Ret	40
18	Pedro Gomes	13	Ret	Ret	11	12	8	19	Ret	23	33	6	6	40
20	David Muffato	Ret	18	21	Ret	Ret	Ret	7	6	15	18	3	13	39
21	Nonô Figueiredo	17	Ret	Ret	18	6	Ret	11	23	8	27	12	8	35
22	Juliano Moro	8	24	26	17	9	Ret	10	5	19	Ret	20	24	33
23	Giuliano Losacco	9	6	Ret	8	15	Ret	Ret	Ret	Ret	20	Ret	12	30
24	Tarso Marques	Ret	Ret	**1**	Ret	Ret	Ret	DNQ	21	26	19	13	21	28
25	Allam Khodair	18	3	24	23	21	21	Ret	Ret	Ret	12	27	15	20
26	Paulo Salustiano	25	23	10	26	5	Ret	DSQ	22	22	22	28	DNQ	18
27	Chico Serra	Ret	17	15	21	10	22	Ret	Ret	18	7	Ret	Ret	16
28	Carlos Alves	22	DNQ	12	22	27	DNQ	6	DNQ	20	DNQ	DNQ	Ret	14
29	Ricardo Zonta	DNQ	22	26	Ret	Ret	11	Ret	25	9	Ret	15	22	13
30	Thiago Marques	Ret	26	11	Ret	13	24	Ret	28	16	24	25	Ret	8
31	Renato Jader David	16	9	Ret	DNQ	DNQ	23	DNQ	Ret	DNQ				7
32	Matheus Greipel	19	Ret	Ret	Ret	14	16	16	12	24	21	22	27	6
33	Guto Negrão	Ret	Ret	19	16	25	14	14	15	Ret	25	Ret	23	5
34	Christian Conde	12	DNQ	DNQ	Ret	29	26	DNQ	DNQ	DNQ	DNQ	DNQ	16	4
35	Fabio Carreira	20	DNQ	25	20	18	19	Ret	13	21	DNQ	19	17	3
35	Felipe Gama	DNQ	13	DNQ	Ret	DNQ		DNQ	Ret					3
37	Daniel Landi	Ret	DNQ	DNQ	DNQ	DNQ	DNQ	17	14	Ret	DNQ	23	25	2
37	Diogo Pachenki						17	DNQ	DNQ	DNQ	Ret	DNQ	14	2
37	Lico Kaesemodel	Ret	14	DNQ	DNQ	DNQ	Ret	DNQ	18	Ret	DNQ	DNQ	DNQ	2
40	Allan Hellmeister	DNQ	DNQ	Ret	15	23	DNQ	20	Ret	25	23	Ret	20	1
40	Antônio Pizzonia					33	15	DNQ	Ret	DSQ	Ret	Ret	18	1
	José Cordova	DNQ	DNQ	DNQ	DNQ		18	Ret	DNQ					0
	Beto Giorgi											18	DNQ	0
	Thiago Medeiros	Ret	DNQ	DNQ	DNQ	DNQ	DNQ	DNQ	DNQ	DNQ	DNQ	26	19	0
	Rafael Daniel							Ret	19					0
	Gualter Salles	26	21	20	DNQ	DNQ	Ret			DNQ	DNQ	DNQ		0
	Ruben Carrapatoso	DNQ	25	DNQ	Ret	26	DNQ	DNQ	DNQ	28	29	Ret	DNQ	0
	William Starostik	DNQ	DNQ	Ret	Ret	DNQ	DNQ	Ret	DNQ	DNQ	28	DNQ	DNQ	0
	Júlio Campos	Ret	29	28		32					Ret			0
	Wellington Justino	DNQ	30	DNQ										0
	Alan Chanoski	DNQ	Ret	DNQ	DNQ	DNQ		DNQ						0
	Cláudio Ricci									DNQ	DNQ	Ret	DNQ	0
	Hybernon Cysne	DNQ	DNQ	DNQ	DNQ		DNQ	DNQ	DNQ		DNQ	DNQ	DNQ	0
	Átila Abreu						DNQ	DNQ	DNQ					0
	Aldo Piedade, Jr.							DNQ	DNQ	DNQ				0
	Nelson Merlo	DNQ	DNQ											0
	Geraldo Rola	DNQ	DNQ											0
	Paulo Gomes							DNQ	DNQ					0
	Angelo Serafim								DNQ	DNQ				0
	Danilo Dirani				DNQ									0
	Galid Osman												DNQ	0
	Nelson Silva, Jr.												DNQ	0
Pos	Driver	INT	CUR	CAM	INT	LON	SCS	CUR	BRA	ARG	TAR	RIO	INT	Pts

Colour	Result
Gold	Winner
Silver	Second place
Bronze	Third place
Green	Points classification
Blue	Non-points classification
Blue	Non-classified finish (NC)
Purple	Retired, not classified (Ret)
Red	Did not qualify (DNQ)
Red	Did not pre-qualify (DNPQ)
Black	Disqualified (DSQ)
White	Did not start (DNS)
White	Withdrew (WD)
White	Race cancelled (C)
Blank	Did not practice (DNP)
Blank	Did not arrive (DNA)
Blank	Excluded (EX)

**Bold** – Pole
Italics – Fastest Lap
