= 2002 Stock Car Brasil season =

Car racing competition

Seasons
- ← 2001 2003 →

The 2002 Stock Car Brasil season was the 24th edition of the Stock Car Brasil Championship. The season started at the Autódromo Internacional Nelson Piquet on March 17 with the final race of the season being held at the Interlagos Circuit on November 24.

The championship was won by Ingo Hoffmann. It was his 12th and final Stock Car Brasil championship victory.

== Calendar ==
The following circuits hosted at least one round of the 2002 championship.

Round	Circuit (Event)	Dates	Map
1	(Rio de Janeiro (state)) Autódromo Internacional Nelson Piquet; Jacarepaguá, Rio de Janeiro	17 March	2002 Stock Car Brasil season is located in Brazil
2	(Paraná (state)) Autódromo Internacional de Curitiba; Curitiba, Paraná	7 April	2002 Stock Car Brasil season is located in Brazil
3	(São Paulo (state)) Autódromo José Carlos Pace; São Paulo, São Paulo	28 April	2002 Stock Car Brasil season is located in Brazil
4	(Paraná (state)) Autódromo Internacional Ayrton Senna; Londrina, Paraná	19 May	2002 Stock Car Brasil season is located in Brazil
5	Autódromo Internacional Orlando Moura; Campo Grande, Mato Grosso do Sul	16 June	2002 Stock Car Brasil season is located in Brazil
6	(São Paulo (state)) Autódromo José Carlos Pace; São Paulo, São Paulo	21 July	2002 Stock Car Brasil season is located in Brazil
7	(Rio de Janeiro (state)) Autódromo Internacional Nelson Piquet; Jacarepaguá, Rio de Janeiro	11 August	2002 Stock Car Brasil season is located in Brazil
8	Autódromo Internacional de Guaporé; Guaporé, Rio Grande do Sul	1 September	2002 Stock Car Brasil season is located in Brazil
9	(Federal District (Brazil)) Autódromo Internacional de Brasília; Brasília, Distrito Federal	29 September	2002 Stock Car Brasil season is located in Brazil
10	(Paraná (state)) Autódromo Internacional de Curitiba; Curitiba, Paraná	13 October	2002 Stock Car Brasil season is located in Brazil
11	(Paraná (state)) Autódromo Internacional Ayrton Senna; Londrina, Paraná	3 November	2002 Stock Car Brasil season is located in Brazil
12	(São Paulo (state)) Autódromo José Carlos Pace; São Paulo, São Paulo	24 November	2002 Stock Car Brasil season is located in Brazil

== Teams and drivers ==
All cars used Vectra Stock Car chassis. All teams and drivers were Brazilian-registered.

Team	No.	Driver	Rounds
Petrobras-Action Power	0	Cacá Bueno	All
Petrobras-Action Power	7	Thiago Marques	All
WB Motorsport	1	Chico Serra	All
WB Motorsport	3	Alceu Feldmann	All
Salmini Racing	2	Neto de Nigris	All
Salmini Racing	57	Rodney Felicio	All
AC Delco	4	Raul Boesel	1–3
AC Delco	4	Antonio Stefani	4
A.Jardim Competições	5	Adalberto Jardim	All
Carlos Alves Competições	8	Carlos Alves	All
Medley-A.Mattheis	9	Xandy Negrão	1–5, 7–12
Medley-A.Mattheis	27	Guto Negrão	All
JF-Filipaper Racing	10	Sandro Tannuri	All
JF-Filipaper Racing	17	Ingo Hoffmann	All
Scuderia 111	11	Nonô Figueiredo	All
Hot Car Competições	12	Hélio Saraiva Jr.	1–7, 9–12
Hot Car Competições	55	Rodrigo Hanashiro	All
Vogel Motorsport	13	André Bragantini	12
Vogel Motorsport	74	Duda Pamplona	All
RC Competições	15	Antonio Jorge Neto	All
Rogério Motta	16	Rogerio Motta	1, 3
Urubatan Rama y Helou Jr.	16	Urubatan Rama y Helou Jr.	6
Sergio Ruas	20	Sergio Ruas	1–2
Jose Bel Camilo	20	Jose Bel Camilo	3–7, 9–12
Boettger Competições	22	Paulo Gomes	All
Boettger Competições	35	David Muffato	All
Nascar Motorsport	25	Luiz Paternostro	5, 7–10
Nascar Motorsport	33	Ricardo Etchenique	All
Nascar Motorsport	77	Aloysio Andrade Filho	1, 4, 6–7, 11–12
Nascar Motorsport	77	Ciro Aliperti Jr.	3
Samsung-Start	32	Paulo Yamamoto	2–3
Itupetro RC	32	Cláudio Ricci	8
Itupetro RC	88	Beto Giorgi	All
Itupetro RC	99	Gualter Salles	All
Katalogo Racing	37	Fernando Correa	2–7, 9–12
Katalogo Racing	37	Claudio Capparelli	1
Katalogo Racing	73	Claudio Capparelli	9–12
Katalogo Racing	73	Marcos Paioli	6
PMP Competições	43	Pedro Gomes	All
JZ Nascimento	55	Marcelo Reis	2

== Results and standings ==
=== Season summary ===
Round	Circuit	Date	Pole position	Fastest lap	Winning driver	Winning team
1	(Rio de Janeiro (state)) Jacarepaguá	17 March	(Brazil) Duda Pamplona	(Brazil) Chico Serra	(Brazil) Chico Serra	WB Motorsport
2	(Paraná (state)) Curitiba	7 April	(Brazil) Carlos Alves	(Brazil) Chico Serra	(Brazil) Chico Serra	WB Motorsport
3	(São Paulo (state)) Interlagos	28 April	(Brazil) Chico Serra	(Brazil) Chico Serra	(Brazil) Ingo Hoffmann	JF-Filipaper Racing
4	(Paraná (state)) Londrina	19 May	(Brazil) Ingo Hoffmann	(Brazil) Xandy Negrão	(Brazil) Ingo Hoffmann	JF-Filipaper Racing
5	(Mato Grosso do Sul) Campo Grande	16 June	(Brazil) Cacá Bueno	(Brazil) Beto Giorgi	(Brazil) Beto Giorgi	Itupetro-RC
6	(São Paulo (state)) Interlagos	21 July	(Brazil) Beto Giorgi	(Brazil) Chico Serra	(Brazil) Chico Serra	WB Motorsport
7	(Rio de Janeiro (state)) Jacarepaguá	11 August	(Brazil) Cacá Bueno	(Brazil) Ingo Hoffmann	(Brazil) Cacá Bueno	Action Power
8	(Rio Grande do Sul) Guaporé	1 September	(Brazil) Xandy Negrão	(Brazil) Xandy Negrão	(Brazil) Cacá Bueno	Action Power
9	(Federal District (Brazil)) Brasília	29 September	(Brazil) Xandy Negrão	(Brazil) Xandy Negrão	(Brazil) Beto Giorgi	Itupetro-RC
10	(Paraná (state)) Curitiba	13 October	(Brazil) Paulo Gomes	(Brazil) Cacá Bueno	(Brazil) Ingo Hoffmann	JF-Filipaper Racing
11	(Paraná (state)) Londrina	3 November	(Brazil) Xandy Negrão	(Brazil) Paulo Gomes	(Brazil) Cacá Bueno	Action Power
12	(São Paulo (state)) Interlagos	24 November	(Brazil) Cacá Bueno	(Brazil) Cacá Bueno	(Brazil) Chico Serra	WB Motorsport

=== Standings ===
Pos	Driver	(Rio de Janeiro (state)) RIO1	(Paraná (state)) CUR1	(São Paulo (state)) INT1	(Paraná (state)) LON1	(Mato Grosso do Sul) CAM	(São Paulo (state)) INT2	(Rio de Janeiro (state)) RIO2	(Rio Grande do Sul) GUA	(Federal District (Brazil)) BRA	(Paraná (state)) CUR2	(Paraná (state)) LON2	(São Paulo (state)) INT3	Pts
1	(Brazil) Ingo Hoffmann	5	10	1	1	Ret	Ret	2	4	9	1	2	6	164
2	(Brazil) Chico Serra	1	1	2	9	Ret	1	6	7	3	Ret	Ret	1	162
3	(Brazil) Cacá Bueno	Ret	2	14	Ret	Ret	3	1	1	2	Ret	1	2	153
4	(Brazil) Beto Giorgi	3	Ret	8	8	1	2	9	9	1	2	Ret	12	140
5	(Brazil) Nonô Figueiredo	7	3	3	4	14	Ret	4	3	4	6	5	3	137
6	(Brazil) Alceu Feldmann	Ret	6	5	Ret	2	Ret	7	5	6	4	6	4	111
7	(Brazil) Xandy Negrão	4	Ret	DNS	2	Ret		3	2	17	3	Ret	Ret	86
8	(Brazil) Paulo Gomes	11	14	16	5	Ret	6	5	8	16	13	3	5	81
9	(Brazil) David Muffato	DNS	4	Ret	3	3	15	10	Ret	7	8	19	9	77
10	(Brazil) Guto Negrão	2	Ret	6	DNS	9	12	8	Ret	5	Ret	12	Ret	65
11	(Brazil) Duda Pamplona	6	DNS	Ret	7	7	Ret	Ret	10	13	5	4	21	63
12	(Brazil) Ricardo Etchenique	9	11	10	Ret	Ret	5	19	Ret	8	9	10	7	61
13	(Brazil) Carlos Alves	Ret	5	15	12	4	8	Ret	14	18	7	8	20	58
14	(Brazil) Adalberto Jardim	12	17	4	DNS	Ret	9	13	11	12	11	7	Ret	52
15	(Brazil) Antonio Jorge Neto	Ret	9	7	Ret	17	4	20	6	Ret	Ret	11	10	51
16	(Brazil) Gualter Salles	10	Ret	13	6	10	Ret	Ret	Ret	Ret	14	9	8	43
17	(Brazil) Pedro Gomes	18	7	11	11	5	DNS	12	DNS	14	12	20	Ret	41
18	(Brazil) Sandro Tannuri	16	Ret	9	14	8	13	16	15	10	10	DNS	17	33
19	(Brazil) Neto de Nigris	Ret	Ret	24	15	12	11	14	13	11	Ret	15	14	23
=	(Brazil) Thiago Marques	8	Ret	22	17	Ret	7	11	Ret	DNS	Ret	Ret	11	23
21	(Brazil) Rodrigo Hanashiro	DNS	8	20	13	6	Ret	17	Ret	Ret	17	16	19	21
22	(Brazil) Luiz Paternostro					11		15	12	Ret	Ret			10
23	(Brazil) Claudio Capparelli	14								Ret	18	14	13	7
=	(Brazil) Raul Boesel	Ret	13	12										7
25	(Brazil) Jose Bel Camilo		DNS	18	18	Ret	10	22		19	Ret	Ret	Ret	6
=	(Brazil) Rodney Felicio	17	12	21	Ret	15	DNS	21	16	Ret	15	Ret	16	6
=	(Brazil) Antonio Stefani				10									6
28	(Brazil) Fernando Correa		18	25	16	16	14	18		15	19	18	15	4
=	(Brazil) Helio Saraiva Jr.	Ret	15	19	Ret	13	Ret	23		DNS	16	17	Ret	4
30	(Brazil) Aloysio Andrade Filho	DNS		DNS	DNS		DNS	DNS				13	18	3
=	(Brazil) Sergio Ruas	13	DNS											3
32	(Brazil) Rogerio Motta	15		Ret										1
-	(Brazil) Marcelo Reis		16											0
-	(Brazil) Paulo Yamamoto		Ret	23										0
-	(Brazil) Ciro Aliperti Jr.			17										0
-	(Brazil) Urubatan Rama y Helou Jr.						16							0
-	(Brazil) Marcos Paioli						Ret							0
-	(Brazil) Cláudio Ricci								Ret					0
-	(Brazil) André Bragantini												Ret	0
Pos	Driver	(Rio de Janeiro (state)) RIO1	(Paraná (state)) CUR1	(São Paulo (state)) INT1	(Paraná (state)) LON1	(Mato Grosso do Sul) CAM	(São Paulo (state)) INT2	(Rio de Janeiro (state)) RIO2	(Rio Grande do Sul) GUA	(Federal District (Brazil)) BRA	(Paraná (state)) CUR2	(Paraná (state)) LON2	(São Paulo (state)) INT3	Pts
