= 2004 Stock Car Brasil season =

Car racing competition

Seasons
- ← 2003 2005 →

The 2004 Stock Car Brasil season was the 26th edition of the Stock Car Brasil Championship. The season started at the Autódromo Internacional de Curitiba on March 26 with the final race of the season being held at the Interlagos Circuit on November 28.

The championship was won by Giuliano Losacco.

== Calendar ==
The following circuits hosted at least one round of the 2004 championship.

Round	Circuit (Event)	Dates	Map
1	(Paraná (state)) Autódromo Internacional de Curitiba; Curitiba, Paraná	26–28 March	2004 Stock Car Brasil season is located in Brazil
2	(São Paulo (state)) Autódromo José Carlos Pace; São Paulo, São Paulo	16–18 April	2004 Stock Car Brasil season is located in Brazil
3	Autódromo Internacional de Tarumã; Viamão, Rio Grande do Sul	30 April–2 May	2004 Stock Car Brasil season is located in Brazil
4	(Paraná (state)) Autódromo Internacional Ayrton Senna; Londrina, Paraná	14–16 May	2004 Stock Car Brasil season is located in Brazil
5	(Rio de Janeiro (state)) Autódromo Internacional Nelson Piquet; Jacarepaguá, Rio de Janeiro	4–6 June	2004 Stock Car Brasil season is located in Brazil
6	(São Paulo (state)) Autódromo José Carlos Pace; São Paulo, São Paulo	16–18 July	2004 Stock Car Brasil season is located in Brazil
7	(Paraná (state)) Autódromo Internacional de Curitiba; Curitiba, Paraná	30 July–1 August	2004 Stock Car Brasil season is located in Brazil
8	(Paraná (state)) Autódromo Internacional Ayrton Senna; Londrina, Paraná	27–29 August	2004 Stock Car Brasil season is located in Brazil
9	(Rio de Janeiro (state)) Autódromo Internacional Nelson Piquet; Jacarepaguá, Rio de Janeiro	17–19 September	2004 Stock Car Brasil season is located in Brazil
10	(Federal District (Brazil)) Autódromo Internacional de Brasília; Brasília, Distrito Federal	15–17 October	2004 Stock Car Brasil season is located in Brazil
11	Autódromo Internacional Orlando Moura; Campo Grande, Mato Grosso do Sul	5–7 November	2004 Stock Car Brasil season is located in Brazil
12	(São Paulo (state)) Autódromo José Carlos Pace; São Paulo, São Paulo	26–28 November	2004 Stock Car Brasil season is located in Brazil

== Teams and drivers ==
All cars used Chevrolet Astra Stock Car chassis. All drivers were Brazilian-registered, except Gabriel Furlán, who raced under Argentine racing license.

Team	No.	Driver	Rounds
Petrobras-Action Power	0	(Brazil) Cacá Bueno	All
Petrobras-Action Power	7	(Brazil) Thiago Marques	All
Boettger Competições	1	(Brazil) David Muffato	All
Boettger Competições	36	(Brazil) Raul Boesel	All
Scuderia 111	2	(Brazil) Neto de Nigris	1–9, 11–12
Scuderia 111	42	(Brazil) Fabio Carreira	11
Scuderia 111	42	(Argentina) Gabriel Furlán	12
Scuderia 111	45	(Brazil) Giuseppe Vecci	7, 9–10
Scuderia 111	71	(Brazil) Paulo Bonifacio	10–12
Scuderia 111	99	(Brazil) Gualter Salles	1–2, 5–6
WB Motorsport	3	(Brazil) Chico Serra	All
WB Motorsport	4	(Brazil) Popó Bueno	All
A.Jardim Competições	5	(Brazil) Adalberto Jardim	9–12
Nasr/Castroneves	5	(Brazil) Adalberto Jardim	1–8
Nasr/Castroneves	41	(Brazil) Antonio Stefani	9–10
Nasr/Castroneves	41	(Brazil) Alexandre Conill	11–12
Nasr/Castroneves	50	(Brazil) Juliano Moro	All
RS Competições	6	(Brazil) Alceu Feldmann	All
Philips Motorsports	8	(Brazil) Carlos Alves	All
Philips Motorsports	80	(Brazil) Luiz Carreira	All
ItuPetro RC	9	(Brazil) Giuliano Losacco	All
ItuPetro RC	25	(Brazil) Ricardo Etchenique	1–10
ItuPetro RC	25	(Brazil) Luiz Paternostro	11–12
JF-Filipaper Racing	10	(Brazil) Sandro Tannuri	All
JF-Filipaper Racing	17	(Brazil) Ingo Hoffmann	All
Avallone Motorsport	11	(Brazil) Nonô Figueiredo	All
Avallone Motorsport	12	(Brazil) Hoover Orsi	All
P&B Racing	14	(Brazil) Wellington Justino	10–11
P&B Racing	14	(Brazil) Maurizio Sandro Sala	12
P&B Racing	88	(Brazil) Beto Giorgi	7–8
Medley-A.Mattheis	15	(Brazil) Antonio Jorge Neto	All
Medley-A.Mattheis	27	(Brazil) Guto Negrão	1–10
Bassani Racing	16	(Brazil) Wagner Ebrahim	1–2, 9–12
Bassani Racing	23	(Brazil) Duda Pamplona	3–9
Bassani Racing	97	(Brazil) Renato Jader David	12
Golden Cross-Vogel	20	(Brazil) André Bragantini	1–3, 5–12
Golden Cross-Vogel	21	(Brazil) Thiago Camilo	All
Katalogo Racing	22	(Brazil) Paulo Gomes	1–7
Katalogo Racing	37	(Brazil) Ricardo Maurício	1–4, 12
Katalogo Racing	37	(Brazil) Rodrigo Sperafico	5–12
Katalogo Racing	45	(Brazil) Giuseppe Vecci	2–5
Motor3 Motorsport	26	(Brazil) Wellington Justino	1, 3–4
Giaffone Motorsport	28	(Brazil) Airton Daré	All
Giaffone Motorsport	43	(Brazil) Pedro Gomes	All
Bennamed-Nascar	33	(Brazil) Valdeno Brito	1–5
Bennamed-Nascar	33	(Brazil) Felipe Maluhy	6–12
Bennamed-Nascar	77	(Brazil) Aloysio de Andrade	1–2, 10
Bennamed-Nascar	77	(Brazil) Wagner Ebrahim	3–8
Bennamed-Nascar	77	(Brazil) Gualter Salles	9
Bennamed-Nascar	77	(Brazil) Aloysio de Andrade	10
Bennamed-Nascar	77	(Brazil) Ricardo Etchenique	11–12
L&M Racing	33	(Brazil) Valdeno Brito	6–12
L&M Racing	91	(Brazil) Henrique Favoretto	1–5
Famossul Motorsport	34	(Brazil) Matheus Greipel	All
Hot Car Competições	42	(Brazil) Wanderley Reck Jr.	11
Hot Car Competições	42	(Brazil) Claudio Capparelli	12
Salmini Racing	57	(Brazil) Rodney Felicio	All

== Results and standings ==
=== Season summary ===
Round	Circuit	Date	Pole position	Fastest lap	Winning driver	Winning team
1	(Paraná (state)) Curitiba	26–28 March	(Brazil) Cacá Bueno	(Brazil) Ricardo Maurício	(Brazil) Giuliano Losacco	ItuPetro RC
2	(São Paulo (state)) Interlagos	16–18 April	(Brazil) Raul Boesel	(Brazil) Thiago Camilo	(Brazil) Giuliano Losacco	ItuPetro RC
3	(Rio Grande do Sul) Tarumã	30 April–2 May	(Brazil) Thiago Camilo	(Brazil) Cacá Bueno	(Brazil) Cacá Bueno	Action Power
4	(Paraná (state)) Londrina	14–16 May	(Brazil) Giuliano Losacco	(Brazil) Cacá Bueno	(Brazil) Giuliano Losacco	ItuPetro RC
5	(Rio de Janeiro (state)) Jacarepaguá	4–6 June	(Brazil) Popó Bueno	(Brazil) Popó Bueno	(Brazil) Ingo Hoffmann	JF-Filipaper Racing
6	(São Paulo (state)) Interlagos	16–18 July	(Brazil) Felipe Maluhy	(Brazil) Chico Serra	(Brazil) Cacá Bueno	Action Power
7	(Paraná (state)) Curitiba	30 July–1 August	(Brazil) Giuliano Losacco	(Brazil) Airton Daré	(Brazil) Pedro Gomes	Giaffone Motorsport
8	(Paraná (state)) Londrina	27–29 August	(Brazil) Duda Pamplona	(Brazil) Pedro Gomes	(Brazil) Giuliano Losacco	ItuPetro RC
9	(Rio de Janeiro (state)) Jacarepaguá	17–19 September	(Brazil) Antonio Jorge Neto	(Brazil) Ingo Hoffmann	(Brazil) Ingo Hoffmann	JF-Filipaper Racing
10	(Federal District (Brazil)) Brasília	15–17 October	(Brazil) Antonio Jorge Neto	(Brazil) Pedro Gomes	(Brazil) Antonio Jorge Neto	Medley-A.Mattheis
11	(Mato Grosso do Sul) Campo Grande	5–7 November	(Brazil) Cacá Bueno	(Brazil) Matheus Greipel	(Brazil) Cacá Bueno	Action Power
12	(São Paulo (state)) Interlagos	26–28 November	(Brazil) Thiago Camilo	(Brazil) Thiago Camilo	(Brazil) Thiago Camilo	Golden Cross-Vogel

=== Championship standings ===
Pos	Driver	(Paraná (state)) CUR1	(São Paulo (state)) INT1	(Rio Grande do Sul) TAR	(Paraná (state)) LON1	(Rio de Janeiro (state)) RIO1	(São Paulo (state)) INT2	(Paraná (state)) CUR2	(Paraná (state)) LON2	(Rio de Janeiro (state)) RIO2	(Federal District (Brazil)) BRA	(Mato Grosso do Sul) CAM	(São Paulo (state)) INT3	Pts
1	(Brazil) Giuliano Losacco	1	1	Ret	1	5	2	2	1	9	10	14	5	177
2	(Brazil) Cacá Bueno	DSQ	3	1	Ret	4	1	11	2	7	Ret	1	4	153
3	(Brazil) Antonio Jorge Neto	6	4	3	9	8	7	Ret	3	2	1	5	2	150
4	(Brazil) Thiago Camilo	9	2	Ret	10	2	17	Ret	19	6	2	2	1	128
5	(Brazil) Raul Boesel	Ret	6	2	2	14	4	Ret	9	16	26	6	10	88
6	(Brazil) Ingo Hoffmann	8	14	Ret	DNS	1	Ret	5	Ret	1	Ret	3	Ret	88
7	(Brazil) David Muffato	Ret	11	5	11	18	12	8	Ret	4	3	4	Ret	78
8	(Brazil) Guta Negrão	Ret	10	4	3	12	10	12	5	10	5			74
9	(Brazil) Pedro Gomes	Ret	8	14	DNS	6	Ret	1	16	DNS	6	Ret	11	72
10	(Brazil) Thiago Marques	DSQ	Ret	7	4	DNS	19	9	12	8	4	8	7	72
11	(Brazil) Chico Serra	10	Ret	8	14	15	3	10	11	22	21	7	6	62
12	(Brazil) Carlos Alves	Ret	9	10	5	Ret	9	23	10	Ret	7	DNS	9	53
13	(Brazil) André Bragantini	Ret	7	Ret		DNS	8	7	7	DNS	8	Ret	8	50
14	(Brazil) Felipe Maluhy						DSQ	3	6	11	9	12	3	48
15	(Brazil) Popó Bueno	Ret	Ret	Ret	17	19	Ret	4	8	3	Ret	Ret	Ret	37
16	(Brazil) Sandro Tannuri	11	20	17	6	10	Ret	13	DSQ	5	15	Ret	Ret	37
17	(Brazil) Alceu Feldmann	2	15	Ret	Ret	9	Ret	Ret	21	15	19	10	15	36
18	(Brazil) Matheus Greipel	4	21	Ret	Ret	DNS	Ret	14	4	14	Ret	13	26	35
19	(Brazil) Ricardo Etchenique	5	Ret	9	DNS	13	14	6	18	26	Ret	15	19	35
20	(Brazil) Duda Pamplona			6	Ret	3	11	Ret	20	23				31
21	(Brazil) Valdeno Brito	Ret	Ret	11	7	20	6	Ret	DNS	Ret	20	Ret	Ret	24
22	(Brazil) Nonô Figueiredo	Ret	5	21	Ret	Ret	18	18	DSQ	12	11	17	14	23
23	(Brazil) Ricardo Maurício	3	13	Ret	15								25	20
24	(Brazil) Wagner Ebrahim	Ret	12	12	Ret	DNS	13	Ret	Ret	24	22	9	17	18
25	(Brazil) Rodrigo Sperafico					DNS	5	17	14	21	14	Ret	20	15
26	(Brazil) Airton Daré	13	16	13	13	11	Ret	21	15	Ret	Ret	Ret	DNS	14
=	(Brazil) Hoover Orsi	Ret	Ret	20	Ret	7	16	24	DSQ	Ret	16	11	Ret	14
28	(Brazil) Luis Carreira Jr.	Ret	Ret	22	8	DNS	Ret	20	Ret	20	25	Ret	13	11
29	(Brazil) Rodney Felicio	12	19	Ret	Ret	17	15	19	13	18	13	Ret	16	10
30	(Brazil) Gualter Salles	7	Ret			DNS	Ret			17				9
31	(Brazil) Juliano Moro	Ret	Ret	19	19	DNS	Ret	Ret	DSQ	13	12	Ret	Ret	7
32	(Brazil) Henrique Favoretto	Ret	22	16	12	Ret								4
=	(Brazil) Paulo Gomes						20	16	Ret	25	24	Ret	12	4
34	(Brazil) Adalberto Jardim	Ret	Ret	15	16	Ret	Ret	Ret	Ret	DNS	Ret	19	24	1
=	(Brazil) Beto Giorgi							15	17					1
-	(Brazil) Neto de Nigris	Ret	17	Ret	18	DNS	DNS	Ret	Ret	DNS		16	21	0
-	(Brazil) Wellington Justino	Ret		23	Ret						Ret	DNS		0
-	(Brazil) Aloysio Andrade Filho	Ret	18								18			0
-	(Brazil) Giuseppe Vecci		Ret	18	DNS	16		22		DNS	23			0
-	(Brazil) Antonio Stefani									19	Ret			0
-	(Brazil) Paulo Bonifacio										17	Ret	23	0
-	(Brazil) Fábio Carreira											18		0
-	(Brazil) Wanderley Reck Jr.											Ret		0
-	(Brazil) Luiz Paternostro											Ret	Ret	0
-	(Brazil) Claudio Capparelli												18	0
-	(Argentina) Gabriel Furlán												22	0
-	(Brazil) Maurizio Sandro Sala												Ret	0
-	(Brazil) Renato Jader												Ret	0
Pos	Driver	(Paraná (state)) CUR1	(São Paulo (state)) INT1	(Rio Grande do Sul) TAR	(Paraná (state)) LON1	(Rio de Janeiro (state)) RIO1	(São Paulo (state)) INT2	(Paraná (state)) CUR2	(Paraná (state)) LON2	(Rio de Janeiro (state)) RIO2	(Federal District (Brazil)) BRA	(Mato Grosso do Sul) CAM	(São Paulo (state)) INT3	Pts
