= 2009 Stock Car Brasil season =

Car racing competition

Seasons
- ← 2008 2010 →

The 2009 Copa Nextel Stock Car season was the 31st Stock Car Brasil season. It began on March 29 at Interlagos and ended on December 6 at same circuit after twelve rounds.

This season introduced a new tubular chassis JL G-09 similar to DTM, replacing the model that was used since 2000. Before the start of the championship, Mitsubishi announced that left the championship. Cacá Bueno won his third championship.

== Teams and drivers ==
All drivers were Brazilian-registered.

| Manufacturer | Team | No. | Driver | Rounds |
|---|---|---|---|---|
| Peugeot 307 | Red Bull Racing | 0 | Cacá Bueno | All |
| Peugeot 307 | Red Bull Racing | 29 | Daniel Serra | All |
| Peugeot 307 | Amir Nasr Racing | 1 | Antônio Pizzonia | 1–6 |
| Peugeot 307 | Amir Nasr Racing | 4 | Claúdio Ricci | 11 |
| Peugeot 307 | Amir Nasr Racing | 5 | Constantino Júnior | 12 |
| Peugeot 307 | Amir Nasr Racing | 8 | Pedro Gomes | 8, 11–12 |
| Peugeot 307 | Amir Nasr Racing | 12 | Hoover Orsi | 8 |
| Peugeot 307 | Amir Nasr Racing | 37 | Claúdio Capparelli | 1–6 |
| Peugeot 307 | JF Racing | 2 | Alan Hellmeister | 12 |
| Peugeot 307 | JF Racing | 7 | Thiago Marques | 1–11 |
| Peugeot 307 | JF Racing | 9 | Giuliano Losacco | All |
| Peugeot 307 | Full Time Sports | 2 | Alan Hellmeister | 8–10 |
| Peugeot 307 | Full Time Sports | 16 | Daniel Landi | 1–4 |
| Peugeot 307 | Full Time Sports | 18 | Allam Khodair | All |
| Peugeot 307 | Full Time Sports | 27 | Guto Negrão | 5–7, 11–12 |
| Peugeot 307 | Avallone Motorsport | 3 | Chico Serra | All |
| Peugeot 307 | Avallone Motorsport | 33 | Felipe Maluhy | All |
| Peugeot 307 | RCM Motorsport | 5 | Enrique Bernoldi | 1–4 |
| Peugeot 307 | RCM Motorsport | 77 | Valdeno Brito | All |
| Peugeot 307 | RCM Motorsport | 88 | Beto Giorgi | 5 |
| Peugeot 307 | RZ Motorsport | 10 | Ricardo Zonta | 1–2, 5, 7–12 |
| Peugeot 307 | RZ Motorsport | 19 | Rodrigo Sperafico | 3–4, 6 |
| Peugeot 307 | RZ Motorsport | 20 | Ricardo Sperafico | All |
| Peugeot 307 | RC3 Bassani | 15 | Antonio Jorge Neto | All |
| Peugeot 307 | RC3 Bassani | 35 | David Muffato | All |
| Chevrolet Vectra | Boettger Competições | 6 | Alceu Feldmann | All |
| Chevrolet Vectra | Boettger Competições | 14 | Luciano Burti | All |
| Chevrolet Vectra | AMG Motorsport | 63 | Lico Kaesemodel | All |
| Chevrolet Vectra | AMG Motorsport | 51 | Átila Abreu | All |
| Chevrolet Vectra | Dolly-Action Power | 8 | Pedro Gomes | 1–2 |
| Chevrolet Vectra | Dolly-Action Power | 70 | Tarso Marques | 3–4, 9–12 |
| Chevrolet Vectra | Dolly-Action Power | 71 | Fábio Carreira | 5 |
| Chevrolet Vectra | Dolly-Action Power | 80 | Marcos Gomes | All |
| Chevrolet Vectra | Officer Motorsport | 11 | Nonô Figueiredo | All |
| Chevrolet Vectra | Officer Motorsport | 23 | Duda Pamplona | All |
| Chevrolet Vectra | Vogel Motorsport | 21 | Thiago Camilo | All |
| Chevrolet Vectra | Vogel Motorsport | 55 | Paulo Salustiano | All |
| Chevrolet Vectra | Medley-A.Mattheis | 31 | William Starostik | All |
| Chevrolet Vectra | Medley-A.Mattheis | 99 | Xandinho Negrão | All |
| Chevrolet Vectra | Hot Car Competições | 44 | Norberto Gresse | All |
| Chevrolet Vectra | Hot Car Competições | 74 | Popó Bueno | All |
| Chevrolet Vectra | Eurofarma RC | 65 | Max Wilson | All |
| Chevrolet Vectra | Eurofarma RC | 90 | Ricardo Maurício | All |

== Race calendar and results ==
All races were held in Brazil.

| Round | Circuit | Date | Pole position | Fastest lap | Winning driver | Winning team |
|---|---|---|---|---|---|---|
| 1 | Interlagos Circuit | March 29 | Paulo Salustiano | Thiago Camilo | Paulo Salustiano | Vogel Motorsport |
| 2 | Autódromo Internacional de Curitiba | April 12 | Valdeno Brito | Valdeno Brito | Valdeno Brito | RCM Motorsport |
| 3 | Autódromo Internacional Nelson Piquet, Brasília | May 3 | Allam Khodair | Allam Khodair | Allam Khodair | Full Time Competições |
| 4 | Autódromo Internacional de Santa Cruz do Sul | May 17 | Cacá Bueno | Cacá Bueno | Max Wilson | Eurofarma RC |
| 5 | Interlagos Circuit | July 5 | Ricardo Maurício | Paulo Salustiano | Marcos Gomes | Action Power |
| 6 | Circuito Ayrton Senna, Salvador | August 9 | Thiago Camilo | Duda Pamplona | Cacá Bueno | Red Bull Racing |
| 7 | Autódromo Internacional Nelson Piquet, Rio de Janeiro | September 20 | Cacá Bueno | Allam Khodair | Daniel Serra | Red Bull Racing |
| 8 | Autódromo Internacional Orlando Moura | October 4 | Átila Abreu | Duda Pamplona | Thiago Camilo | Vogel Motorsport |
Super Final
| 9 | Autódromo Internacional de Curitiba | October 25 | Ricardo Zonta | David Muffato | Ricardo Maurício | Eurofarma RC |
| 10 | Autódromo Internacional Nelson Piquet, Brasília | November 8 | Allam Khodair | Allam Khodair | Allam Khodair | Full Time Competições |
| 11 | Autódromo Internacional de Tarumã | November 22 | Cacá Bueno | Marcos Gomes | Luciano Burti | Boettger Competições |
| 12 | Interlagos Circuit | December 6 | Thiago Camilo | Thiago Camilo | Thiago Camilo | Vogel Motorsport |

=== Drivers' championship ===
| Pos | Driver | INT1 | CUR1 | BRA1 | SCS | INT2 | SAL | RIO | CAM | CUR2 | BRA2 | TAR | INT3 | Pts |
Super Final
| 1 | Cacá Bueno | 13 | 2 | Ret | **2** | 3 | 1 | **2** | 9 | 3 | 3 | **3** | 5 | 300 |
| 2 | Thiago Camilo | Ret | 3 | 7 | DSQ | 27 | Ret | 7 | 1 | 4 | 8 | Ret | **1** | 269 |
| 3 | Ricardo Maurício | 2 | 7 | 14 | Ret | **6** | Ret | 3 | 7 | 1 | 17 | Ret | 2 | 264 |
| 4 | Allam Khodair | 8 | 19 | **1** | 13 | Ret | 13 | Ret | 6 | Ret | **1** | 5 | 10 | 261 |
| 5 | Luciano Burti | Ret | 15 | 8 | 11 | 2 | 4 | 13 | 8 | 8 | 7 | 1 | 7 | 258 |
| 6 | Marcos Gomes | Ret | 9 | 5 | Ret | 1 | 2 | 5 | Ret | 16 | 15 | 4 | 13 | 248 |
| 7 | Átila Abreu | 7 | Ret | 3 | 3 | 12 | Ret | 4 | **3** | 7 | 10 | 7 | 15 | 244 |
| 8 | Valdeno Brito | 11 | **1** | 10 | 6 | Ret | 7 | 8 | 4 | Ret | 5 | DNS | 9 | 243 |
| 9 | Max Wilson | Ret | 5 | 4 | 1 | 16 | 14 | 9 | 25 | 13 | 18 | 10 | 3 | 234 |
| 9 | Daniel Serra | Ret | 11 | Ret | 5 | Ret | 16 | 1 | 11 | 18 | 6 | 14 | 11 | 234 |
Super Final cutoff
| 11 | Ricardo Sperafico | 21 | Ret | 9 | 8 | 8 | 3 | Ret | 5 | 2 | 13 | 9 | 23 | 74 |
| 12 | Xandinho Negrão | 10 | 8 | Ret | Ret | Ret | 5 | 6 | 10 | Ret | 12 | 15 | 6 | 66 |
| 13 | Duda Pamplona | 18 | Ret | 15 | Ret | 7 | 12 | 12 | 2 | 10 | 4 | Ret | 22 | 59 |
| 14 | Antonio Jorge Neto | 19 | 10 | 2 | 16 | 10 | 6 | 17 | 18 | 6 | 21 | Ret | Ret | 52 |
| 15 | Antônio Pizzonia | 3 | 4 | Ret | 4 | 9 | Ret | | | | | | | 51 |
| 16 | Ricardo Zonta | DSQ | 6 | | | 25 | | 10 | 14 | **14** | 2 | Ret | Ret | 48 |
| 17 | Paulo Salustiano | **1** | 12 | DNS | 12 | 19 | Ret | 14 | Ret | Ret | Ret | Ret | 11 | 43 |
| 18 | Giuliano Losacco | 9 | 14 | Ret | 15 | 4 | 9 | Ret | 12 | 5 | Ret | Ret | Ret | 39 |
| 19 | Lico Kaesemodel | 6 | 25 | 20 | Ret | 5 | Ret | 23 | 20 | 12 | 14 | 8 | Ret | 36 |
| 19 | Nonô Figueiredo | 5 | Ret | 12 | 14 | 15 | Ret | 11 | 23 | 23 | 9 | 11 | 23 | 36 |
| 21 | Alceu Feldmann | 17 | 17 | 13 | 10 | 22 | 8 | 18 | 16 | 10 | 23 | 6 | 24 | 33 |
| 22 | Popó Bueno | 20 | Ret | 16 | 7 | Ret | Ret | 20 | 13 | 21 | Ret | 2 | 16 | 32 |
| 23 | David Muffato | 12 | 18 | 6 | 18 | 20 | Ret | 15 | 15 | 22 | 24 | 12 | 7 | 29 |
| 24 | William Starostik | DSQ | 16 | Ret | DSQ | 11 | Ret | 21 | Ret | 13 | 11 | 14 | DSQ | 15 |
| 25 | Felipe Maluhy | Ret | 23 | 11 | DSQ | 14 | 9 | 16 | 21 | Ret | 19 | Ret | Ret | 14 |
| 26 | Rodrigo Sperafico | | | 19 | 8 | | 17 | | | | | | | 8 |
| 26 | Norberto Gresse | 14 | 20 | Ret | 17 | Ret | 10 | Ret | 19 | Ret | 20 | Ret | Ret | 8 |
| 28 | Chico Serra | 23 | 22 | 17 | 19 | 21 | 11 | 19 | Ret | Ret | 16 | Ret | 15 | 6 |
| 28 | Thiago Marques | 16 | 13 | 18 | Ret | 13 | 19 | 22 | 17 | 16 | 22 | Ret | | 6 |
| 30 | Enrique Bernoldi | 15 | Ret | Ret | DSQ | | | | | | | | | 1 |
| 31 | Pedro Gomes | Ret | 24 | | | | | | Ret | | | 16 | Ret | 0 |
| 31 | Allam Hellmeister | | | | | | | | 22 | 17 | Ret | | 19 | 0 |
| 31 | Contantino Júnior | | | | | | | | | | | | 17 | 0 |
| 31 | Claúdio Caparelli | Ret | 26 | Ret | 20 | 18 | 18 | | | | | | | 0 |
| 31 | Tarso Marques | | | Ret | 18 | | | | | 18 | Ret | Ret | Ret | 0 |
| 31 | Guto Negrão | | | | | Ret | Ret | 24 | | | | Ret | 20 | 0 |
| 31 | Daniel Landi | DSQ | 21 | Ret | Ret | | | | | | | | | 0 |
| 31 | Beto Giorgi | | | | | 23 | | | | | | | | 0 |
| 31 | Fábio Carreira | | | | | 24 | | | | | | | | 0 |
| 31 | Hoover Orsi | | | | | | | | 24 | | | | | 0 |
| 31 | Claúdio Ricci | | | | | | | | | | | Ret | | 0 |
| Pos | Driver | INT1 | CUR1 | BRA1 | SCS | INT2 | SAL | RIO | CAM | CUR2 | BRA2 | TAR | INT3 | Pts |

| Colour | Result |
|---|---|
| Gold | Winner |
| Silver | Second place |
| Bronze | Third place |
| Green | Points classification |
| Blue | Non-points classification |
| Blue | Non-classified finish (NC) |
| Purple | Retired, not classified (Ret) |
| Red | Did not qualify (DNQ) |
| Red | Did not pre-qualify (DNPQ) |
| Black | Disqualified (DSQ) |
| White | Did not start (DNS) |
| White | Withdrew (WD) |
| White | Race cancelled (C) |
| Blank | Did not practice (DNP) |
| Blank | Did not arrive (DNA) |
| Blank | Excluded (EX) |

**Bold** – Pole
Italics – Fastest Lap
