= 2001 Stock Car Brasil season =

Car racing competition

Seasons
- ← 2000 2002 →

The 2001 Stock Car Brasil season was the 23rd edition of the Stock Car Brasil Championship. The season began at the Autódromo Internacional de Curitiba on April 7 and concluded at the Interlagos Circuit on November 18.

The championship would be won by Chico Serra for the third consecutive time. The season was marred by the death of competitor Laércio Justino after a crash at the pit lane entrance of the Autódromo Internacional de Brasília.

== Calendar ==
The following circuits hosted at least one round of the 2001 championship.

| Round | Circuit (Event) | Dates | Map |
|---|---|---|---|
| 1 | (Paraná (state)) Autódromo Internacional de Curitiba; Curitiba, Paraná | 7–8 April | 2001 Stock Car Brasil season is located in Brazil |
| 2 | Autódromo Internacional de Tarumã; Viamão, Rio Grande do Sul | 21–22 April | 2001 Stock Car Brasil season is located in Brazil |
| 3 | (São Paulo (state)) Autódromo José Carlos Pace; São Paulo, São Paulo | 5–6 May | 2001 Stock Car Brasil season is located in Brazil |
| 4 | (Paraná (state)) Autódromo Internacional de Curitiba; Curitiba, Paraná | 19–20 May | 2001 Stock Car Brasil season is located in Brazil |
| 5 | (Federal District (Brazil)) Autódromo Internacional de Brasília; Brasília, Distrito Federal | 9–10 June | 2001 Stock Car Brasil season is located in Brazil |
| 6 | (São Paulo (state)) Autódromo José Carlos Pace; São Paulo, São Paulo | 21–22 July | 2001 Stock Car Brasil season is located in Brazil |
| 7 | (Rio de Janeiro (state)) Autódromo Internacional Nelson Piquet; Jacarepaguá, Rio de Janeiro | 11–12 August | 2001 Stock Car Brasil season is located in Brazil |
| 8 | Autódromo Internacional Ayrton Senna; Goiânia, Goiás | 25–26 August | 2001 Stock Car Brasil season is located in Brazil |
| 9 | (Rio de Janeiro (state)) Autódromo Internacional Nelson Piquet; Jacarepaguá, Rio de Janeiro | 22–23 September | 2001 Stock Car Brasil season is located in Brazil |
| 10 | (Paraná (state)) Autódromo Internacional de Curitiba; Curitiba, Paraná | 20–21 October | 2001 Stock Car Brasil season is located in Brazil |
| 11 | (Paraná (state)) Autódromo Internacional Ayrton Senna; Londrina, Paraná | 3–4 November | 2001 Stock Car Brasil season is located in Brazil |
| 12 | (São Paulo (state)) Autódromo José Carlos Pace; São Paulo, São Paulo | 17–18 November | 2001 Stock Car Brasil season is located in Brazil |

=== Cancelled races ===
- An event at the Autódromo Internacional Ayrton Senna scheduled for 2–3 June in Goiânia was cancelled.

== Teams and drivers ==
All competitors utilized a Chevrolet Vectra chassis. All teams and drivers were Brazilian-registered.

| Team | No. | Driver | Rounds |
|---|---|---|---|
| Privateer | 0 | Mário Covas Neto | All |
| WB Motorsport | 1 | Chico Serra | All |
| WB Motorsport | 3 | Alceu Feldmann | All |
| Salmini Racing | 2 | Neto de Nigris | 1–4, 6–12 |
| Salmini Racing | 57 | Rodney Felicio | All |
| A. Jardim Competições | 5 | Adalberto Jardim | All |
| Privateer | 6 | Carlos Augusto Falletti | 1–9, 13 |
| Giaffone Motorsport | 7 | André Giaffone | All |
| Carlos Alves Competições | 8 | Carlos Alves | All |
| Carlos Alves Competições | 75 | Rogério Motta | All |
| Medley-A.Mattheis | 9 | Xandy Negrão | 1–4, 6–12 |
| Medley-A.Mattheis | 27 | Guto Negrão | 1–4, 6–12 |
| JF-Filipaper Racing | 10 | Sandro Tannuri | 1–2, 6–12 |
| JF-Filipaper Racing | 17 | Ingo Hoffmann | All |
| JF-Filipaper Racing | 71 | Rodrigo Hanashiro | All |
| Scuderia 111 | 11 | Nonô Figueiredo | All |
| Scuderia 111 | 20 | José Bel Camilo | 1–4, 6–10, 12 |
| Scuderia 111 | 33 | Affonso Giaffone | 1–4 |
| Scuderia 111 | 33 | Felipe Maluhy | 5–9 |
| Amici Racing | 12 | Helio Saraiva Jr. | 1–4, 6–7, 9–10, 12 |
| RC Competições | 15 | Antonio Jorge Neto | All |
| RC Competições | 23 | Ricardo Etchenique | All |
| RC Competições | 33 | Gualter Salles | 10–12 |
| RC Competições | 77 | Aloysio Andrade Filho | All |
| RC Competições | 88 | Beto Giorgi | All |
| Privateer | 21 | Newton Grillo | 1–4 |
| Boettger Competições | 22 | Paulo Gomes | All |
| Boettger Competições | 35 | David Muffato | All |
| Privateer | 23 | Ananias Justino | 1–3 |
| Porangatu Racing | 26 | Laércio Justino | 1–4 |
| Action Power Racing | 32 | Paulo Yamamoto | 1, 3–4, 6–12 |
| Privateer | 34 | Flávio Trindade | 4 |
| Max Racing | 37 | Fernando Correa | 1–3, 6–12 |
| Hot Car Competições | 44 | Antonio Stefani | 9–12 |
| Privateer | 54 | Carlos Cunha | 1–3 |
| Privateer | 55 | Marcelo Reis | 1–2 |
| Privateer | 64 | Adson Moura | 1–4, 6–7 |
| Vogel Motorsport | 74 | Duda Pamplona | All |
| Sprint Racing | 81 | Raul Boesel | 1–3, 5–12 |

== Results and standings ==
=== Season summary ===
| Round | Circuit | Date | Pole position | Fastest lap | Winning driver | Winning team |
|---|---|---|---|---|---|---|
| 1 | (Paraná (state)) Curitiba | 7–8 April | (Brazil) Chico Serra | (Brazil) Alceu Feldmann | (Brazil) Chico Serra | WB Motorsport |
| 2 | (Rio Grande do Sul) Tarumã | 21–22 April | (Brazil) Paulo Gomes | (Brazil) Paulo Gomes | (Brazil) Paulo Gomes | Boettger Competições |
| 3 | (São Paulo (state)) Interlagos | 5–6 May | (Brazil) Paulo Gomes | (Brazil) Adalberto Jardim | (Brazil) Nonô Figueiredo | Scuderia 111 |
| 4 | (Paraná (state)) Curitiba | 19–20 May | (Brazil) Xandy Negrão | (Brazil) Chico Serra | (Brazil) Chico Serra | WB Motorsport |
| 5 | (Federal District (Brazil)) Brasília | 9–10 June | (Brazil) Ingo Hoffmann | (Brazil) Ingo Hoffmann | (Brazil) Ingo Hoffmann | JF Racing |
| 6 | (São Paulo (state)) Interlagos | 21–22 July | (Brazil) Chico Serra | (Brazil) Xandy Negrão | (Brazil) Xandy Negrão | Medley-A.Mattheis |
| 7 | (Rio de Janeiro (state)) Jacarepaguá | 11–12 August | (Brazil) Ingo Hoffmann | (Brazil) Xandy Negrão | (Brazil) Xandy Negrão | Medley-A.Mattheis |
| 8 | (Goiás) Goiânia | 25–26 August | (Brazil) Chico Serra | (Brazil) Chico Serra | (Brazil) Chico Serra | WB Motorsport |
| 9 | (Rio de Janeiro (state)) Jacarepaguá | 22–23 September | (Brazil) Beto Giorgi | (Brazil) Chico Serra | (Brazil) Beto Giorgi | RC Competições |
| 10 | (Paraná (state)) Curitiba | 20–21 October | (Brazil) Xandy Negrão | (Brazil) Chico Serra | (Brazil) Chico Serra | WB Motorsport |
| 11 | (Paraná (state)) Londrina | 3–4 November | (Brazil) Beto Giorgi | (Brazil) Ingo Hoffmann | (Brazil) Ingo Hoffmann | JF Racing |
| 12 | (São Paulo (state)) Interlagos | 17–18 November | (Brazil) Chico Serra | (Brazil) Chico Serra | (Brazil) Chico Serra | WB Motorsport |

=== Championship standings ===
| Pos | Driver | (Paraná (state)) CUR1 | (Rio Grande do Sul) TAR | (São Paulo (state)) INT1 | (Paraná (state)) CUR2 | (Federal District (Brazil)) BRA | (São Paulo (state)) INT2 | (Rio de Janeiro (state)) RIO1 | (Goiás) GOI | (Rio de Janeiro (state)) RIO2 | (Paraná (state)) CUR3 | (Paraná (state)) LON | (São Paulo (state)) INT3 | Pts |
|---|---|---|---|---|---|---|---|---|---|---|---|---|---|---|
| 1 | (Brazil) Chico Serra | 1 | 4 | 2 | 1 | 2 | DNS | 2 | 1 | 3 | 1 | Ret | 1 | 167 |
| 2 | (Brazil) Ingo Hoffmann | Ret | 3 | 7 | 2 | 1 | 5 | 3 | 2 | Ret | Ret | 1 | 3 | 118 |
| 3 | (Brazil) Beto Giorgi | 2 | 16 | 3 | 19 | 8 | 6 | 7 | 4 | 1 | 3 | 2 | Ret | 97 |
| 4 | (Brazil) Xandy Negrão | 17 | DNS | Ret | 3 | | 1 | 1 | Ret | 5 | 2 | 3 | Ret | 87 |
| 5 | (Brazil) Antonio Jorge Neto | 4 | DNS | Ret | Ret | 6 | DNS | 8 | 6 | 7 | 5 | 4 | 4 | 57 |
| 6 | (Brazil) Paulo Gomes | Ret | 1 | 6 | 12 | 4 | DNS | 6 | 5 | Ret | DNS | 6 | 14 | 56 |
| 7 | (Brazil) David Muffato | 15 | 2 | Ret | 14 | Ret | DNS | 9 | Ret | 4 | 4 | 10 | 2 | 53 |
| 8 | (Brazil) Carlos Alves | 5 | 18 | 4 | 5 | 7 | 9 | 11 | 7 | 8 | DNS | 18 | 5 | 47 |
| 9 | (Brazil) Nonô Figueiredo | Ret | 14 | 1 | 7 | Ret | 7 | 12 | 10 | 6 | 9 | 5 | 10 | 46 |
| 10 | (Brazil) Raul Boesel | 8 | 11 | 16 | | 5 | 3 | 10 | Ret | 2 | 10 | 12 | 17 | 40 |
| 11 | (Brazil) Rogerio Motta | 6 | 6 | 12 | 6 | 11 | 14 | DNS | 3 | Ret | 7 | 7 | 16 | 38 |
| 12 | (Brazil) Adalberto Jardim | 11 | 17 | 11 | Ret | 3 | 2 | Ret | Ret | Ret | 8 | 9 | 15 | 32 |
| 13 | (Brazil) Alceu Feldmann | 3 | 13 | Ret | 8 | 9 | 13 | 5 | 8 | 13 | Ret | Ret | Ret | 28 |
| 14 | (Brazil) Ricardo Etchenique | 7 | DNS | 15 | 10 | 15 | DNS | 21 | Ret | 14 | 6 | 8 | 8 | 17 |
| 15 | (Brazil) Affonso Giaffone | Ret | 7 | 8 | 4 | | | | | | | | | 17 |
| 16 | (Brazil) Aloysio Andrade Filho | Ret | DNS | 9 | 9 | Ret | Ret | 4 | Ret | Ret | DNS | 11 | DNS | 14 |
| 17 | (Brazil) Neto de Nigris | 10 | 9 | 13 | 13 | | 4 | 15 | 12 | 10 | Ret | 15 | 12 | 14 |
| 18 | (Brazil) Carlos Augusto Falletti | 9 | 8 | 5 | 16 | 10 | DNS | Ret | Ret | 17 | | | 21 | 14 |
| 19 | (Brazil) Duda Pamplona | Ret | 5 | 14 | Ret | 16 | Ret | DNS | Ret | 9 | 18 | Ret | 9 | 12 |
| 20 | (Brazil) Guto Negrão | Ret | DNS | Ret | Ret | | 11 | Ret | 11 | 12 | 11 | Ret | 6 | 6 |
| 21 | (Brazil) André Giaffone | 14 | 19 | 10 | Ret | Ret | Ret | DNS | Ret | Ret | 12 | Ret | 7 | 5 |
| 22 | (Brazil) Mário Covas Neto | Ret | DNS | DNS | 11 | 14 | 8 | 13 | 9 | 16 | Ret | DNS | 11 | 5 |
| 23 | (Brazil) Rodney Felicio | Ret | 10 | Ret | DNS | 13 | Ret | Ret | 14 | 11 | 16 | 16 | 18 | 1 |
| 24 | (Brazil) Felipe Maluhy | | | | | Ret | 10 | 14 | 17 | 15 | | | | 1 |
| - | (Brazil) José Bel Camilo | 12 | DNS | Ret | 18 | | DNS | 19 | Ret | Ret | Ret | | 19 | 0 |
| - | (Brazil) Sandro Tannuri | 13 | DNS | | | | DNS | Ret | 13 | 20 | 14 | Ret | 22 | 0 |
| - | (Brazil) Marcelo Reis | 16 | DNS | | | | | | | | | | | 0 |
| - | (Brazil) Laércio Justino | Ret | DNS | Ret | Ret | | | | | | | | | 0 |
| - | (Brazil) Newton Grillo | Ret | DNS | Ret | 17 | | | | | | | | | 0 |
| - | (Brazil) Rodrigo Hanashiro | Ret | 12 | Ret | 15 | 12 | 15 | 16 | DNS | Ret | 13 | 13 | Ret | 0 |
| - | (Brazil) Carlos Cunha | Ret | DNS | Ret | | | | | | | | | | 0 |
| - | (Brazil) Paulo Yamamoto | Ret | | 17 | Ret | | DNS | 18 | 16 | Ret | 17 | DNS | 20 | 0 |
| - | (Brazil) Adson Moura | Ret | 15 | 18 | Ret | | DNS | Ret | | | | | | 0 |
| - | (Brazil) Fernando Correa | Ret | DNS | 19 | | | Ret | 20 | 15 | 19 | Ret | 17 | 23 | 0 |
| - | (Brazil) Helio Saraiva Jr. | Ret | 20 | Ret | Ret | | 12 | 17 | | 18 | Ret | | 13 | 0 |
| - | (Brazil) Ananias Justino | Ret | DNS | Ret | | | | | | | | | | 0 |
| - | (Brazil) Flávio Trindade | | | | Ret | | | | | | | | | 0 |
| - | (Brazil) Antonio Stefani | | | | | | | | Ret | Ret | Ret | Ret | Ret | 0 |
| - | (Brazil) Gualter Salles | | | | | | | | | | 15 | 14 | Ret | 0 |
| Pos | Driver | (Paraná (state)) CUR1 | (Rio Grande do Sul) TAR | (São Paulo (state)) INT1 | (Paraná (state)) CUR2 | (Federal District (Brazil)) BRA | (São Paulo (state)) INT2 | (Rio de Janeiro (state)) RIO1 | (Goiás) GOI | (Rio de Janeiro (state)) RIO2 | (Paraná (state)) CUR3 | (Paraná (state)) LON | (São Paulo (state)) INT3 | Pts |
