= 2005 Stock Car Brasil season =

Seasons
- ← 2004 2006 →

The 2005 Stock Car Brasil season (known for commercial reasons as the 2005 Copa Nextel Stock Car season) was the 27th edition of the Stock Car Brasil Championship. The season started at the Interlagos Circuit on May 1 with the final race of the season being held at the same circuit on November 27.

The championship was won by Giuliano Losacco for the second year in succession; emerging victorious over Cacá Bueno by one point.

== Calendar ==
The following circuits hosted at least one round of the 2005 championship.

Round	Circuit (Event)	Dates	Map
1	(São Paulo (state)) Autódromo José Carlos Pace; São Paulo, São Paulo	29 April–1 May	2005 Stock Car Brasil season is located in South America
2	(Paraná (state)) Autódromo Internacional de Curitiba; Curitiba, Paraná	13–15 May	2005 Stock Car Brasil season is located in South America
3	(Rio de Janeiro (state)) Autódromo Internacional Nelson Piquet; Jacarepaguá, Rio de Janeiro	17–19 June	2005 Stock Car Brasil season is located in South America
4	(São Paulo (state)) Autódromo José Carlos Pace; São Paulo, São Paulo	1–3 July	2005 Stock Car Brasil season is located in South America
5	(Paraná (state)) Autódromo Internacional de Curitiba; Curitiba, Paraná	22–24 July	2005 Stock Car Brasil season is located in South America
6	(Paraná (state)) Autódromo Internacional Ayrton Senna; Londrina, Paraná	26–28 August	2005 Stock Car Brasil season is located in South America
7	(Federal District (Brazil)) Autódromo Internacional de Brasília; Brasília, Distrito Federal	16–18 September	2005 Stock Car Brasil season is located in South America
8	Autódromo Internacional de Santa Cruz do Sul; Santa Cruz do Sul, Rio Grande do Sul	30 September–2 October	2005 Stock Car Brasil season is located in South America
9	Autódromo Internacional de Tarumã; Viamão, Rio Grande do Sul	14–16 October	2005 Stock Car Brasil season is located in South America
10	Autódromo Oscar y Juan Gálvez; Buenos Aires, Argentina	28–30 October	2005 Stock Car Brasil season is located in South America
11	(Rio de Janeiro (state)) Autódromo Internacional Nelson Piquet; Jacarepaguá, Rio de Janeiro	11–13 November	2005 Stock Car Brasil season is located in South America
12	(São Paulo (state)) Autódromo José Carlos Pace; São Paulo, São Paulo	25–27 November	2005 Stock Car Brasil season is located in South America

== Teams and drivers ==
All drivers were Brazilian-registered, except Esteban Tuero, who raced under Argentine racing license.

Manufacturer	Vehicle	Team	No.	Driver	Rounds
Chevrolet	Astra	Petrobras-Action Power	0	(Brazil) Cacá Bueno	All
Chevrolet	Astra	Petrobras-Action Power	7	(Brazil) Thiago Marques	All
Chevrolet	Astra	Medley-A.Mattheis	2	(Argentina) Esteban Tuero	10
Chevrolet	Astra	Medley-A.Mattheis	9	(Brazil) Giuliano Losacco	All
Chevrolet	Astra	Medley-A.Mattheis	27	(Brazil) Guto Negrão	All
Chevrolet	Astra	RC3 Bassani	3	(Brazil) Chico Serra	All
Chevrolet	Astra	RC3 Bassani	34	(Brazil) Matheus Greipel	All
Chevrolet	Astra	WB Motosport	4	(Brazil) Popó Bueno	1–10
Chevrolet	Astra	WB Motosport	19	(Brazil) Rodrigo Sperafico	All
Chevrolet	Astra	WB Motosport	30	(Brazil) Luis Garcia Jr.	All
Chevrolet	Astra	Neo Química-Boettger	6	(Brazil) Alceu Feldmann	All
Chevrolet	Astra	Neo Química-Boettger	35	(Brazil) David Muffato	All
Chevrolet	Astra	Carlos Alves Competições	8	(Brazil) Carlos Alves	1–2, 12
Chevrolet	Astra	Carlos Alves Competições	43	(Brazil) Pedro Gomes	6–12
Chevrolet	Astra	RS Competições	11	(Brazil) Nonô Figueiredo	All
Chevrolet	Astra	RS Competições	18	(Brazil) Allam Khodair	All
Chevrolet	Astra	NasrCastroneves	12	(Brazil) Hoover Orsi	All
Chevrolet	Astra	NasrCastroneves	31	(Brazil) Juliano Moro	All
Chevrolet	Astra	Eurofarma RC	14	(Brazil) Luciano Burti	All
Chevrolet	Astra	Eurofarma RC	15	(Brazil) Antonio Jorge Neto	All
Chevrolet	Astra	Hot Car Competições	16	(Brazil) Wagner Ebrahim	All
Chevrolet	Astra	Texaco-Vogel	21	(Brazil) Thiago Camilo	All
Chevrolet	Astra	Texaco-Vogel	99	(Brazil) Gualter Salles	All
Chevrolet	Astra	Scuderia 111	25	(Brazil) Angelo Serafim	5–7
Chevrolet	Astra	Scuderia 111	65	(Brazil) Felipe Gama	8–12
Chevrolet	Astra	Scuderia 111	71	(Brazil) Antonio Stefani	1–4
Chevrolet	Astra	Scuderia 111	80	(Brazil) Luis Carreira Jr.	All
Chevrolet	Astra	PowerTech	44	(Brazil) Diogo Pachenki	All
Chevrolet	Astra	MT Racing	45	(Brazil) Wanderley Reck Jr.	All
Chevrolet	Astra	Greco Motorsport	47	(Brazil) Sérgio Paese	3
Chevrolet	Astra	RR Embratel 21 Motorsport	63	(Brazil) Ariel Barranco	11–12
Chevrolet	Astra	RR Embratel 21 Motorsport	210	(Brazil) Raul Boesel	All
Chevrolet	Astra	JF Racing	87	(Brazil) Ruben Fontes	All
Chevrolet	Astra	JF Racing	88	(Brazil) Beto Giorgi	All
Chevrolet	Astra	L&M Racing	90	(Brazil) Ricardo Maurício	All
Chevrolet	Astra	L&M Racing	91	(Brazil) Henrique Favoretto	1–10, 12
Chevrolet	Astra	L&M Racing	91	(Brazil) Sérgio Paese	11
Mitsubishi	Lancer Evolution	Bennamed-Nascar	2	(Brazil) Neto de Nigris	1–2, 4
Mitsubishi	Lancer Evolution	Bennamed-Nascar	2	(Argentina) Esteban Tuero	3
Mitsubishi	Lancer Evolution	Bennamed-Nascar	4	(Brazil) Popó Bueno	12
Mitsubishi	Lancer Evolution	Bennamed-Nascar	77	(Brazil) Valdeno Brito	All
Mitsubishi	Lancer Evolution	Tatu Motorsport	5	(Brazil) Adalberto Jardim	All
Mitsubishi	Lancer Evolution	Tatu Motorsport	20	(Brazil) Alan Chanoski	7–9
Mitsubishi	Lancer Evolution	Tatu Motorsport	20	(Brazil) André Bragantini	10
Mitsubishi	Lancer Evolution	AMG-Filipaper Racing	10	(Brazil) Sandro Tannuri	All
Mitsubishi	Lancer Evolution	AMG-Filipaper Racing	17	(Brazil) Ingo Hoffmann	All
Mitsubishi	Lancer Evolution	Officer Motorsport	23	(Brazil) Duda Pamplona	All
Mitsubishi	Lancer Evolution	Terra-Avallone	33	(Brazil) Felipe Maluhy	All
Mitsubishi	Lancer Evolution	Terra-Avallone	55	(Brazil) Christian Fittipaldi	All
Mitsubishi	Lancer Evolution	Katalogo Racing	37	(Brazil) Paulo Salustiano	6, 9–10
Mitsubishi	Lancer Evolution	Katalogo Racing	37	(Brazil) Rodrigo Pimenta	7–8
Mitsubishi	Lancer Evolution	Katalogo Racing	37	(Brazil) Roberto Moreno	11
Mitsubishi	Lancer Evolution	Katalogo Racing	37	(Brazil) André Bragantini	12
Mitsubishi	Lancer Evolution	Katalogo Racing	40	(Brazil) Fabio Carreira	All
Mitsubishi	Lancer Evolution	Katalogo Racing	43	(Brazil) Pedro Gomes	1–5

== Results and standings ==
=== Season summary ===
Round	Circuit	Date	Pole position	Fastest lap	Winning driver	Winning team
1	(São Paulo (state)) Interlagos	1 May	(Brazil) Hoover Orsi	(Brazil) David Muffato	(Brazil) Cacá Bueno	Petrobras-Action Power
2	(Paraná (state)) Curitiba	15 May	(Brazil) Giuliano Losacco	(Brazil) Wanderley Reck Jr.	(Brazil) Cacá Bueno	Petrobras-Action Power
3	(Rio de Janeiro (state)) Jacarepaguá	19 June	(Brazil) Thiago Camilo	(Brazil) Thiago Camilo	(Brazil) Thiago Camilo	Texaco-Vogel
4	(São Paulo (state)) Interlagos	3 July	(Brazil) Hoover Orsi	(Brazil) Thiago Camilo	(Brazil) Hoover Orsi	NasrCastroneves
5	(Paraná (state)) Curitiba	24 July	(Brazil) Cacá Bueno	(Brazil) Hoover Orsi	(Brazil) Ingo Hoffmann	AMG-Filipaper Racing
6	(Paraná (state)) Londrina	28 August	(Brazil) Hoover Orsi	(Brazil) David Muffato	(Brazil) Hoover Orsi	NasrCastroneves
7	(Federal District (Brazil)) Brasília	18 September	(Brazil) Cacá Bueno	(Brazil) Ricardo Maurício	(Brazil) Cacá Bueno	Petrobras-Action Power
8	(Rio Grande do Sul) Santa Cruz do Sul	2 October	(Brazil) Cacá Bueno	(Brazil) Giuliano Losacco	(Brazil) Cacá Bueno	Petrobras-Action Power
9	(Rio Grande do Sul) Tarumã	16 October	(Brazil) Ruben Fontes	(Brazil) Pedro Gomes	(Brazil) Ruben Fontes	JF Racing
10	(Argentina) Buenos Aires	30 October	(Brazil) Christian Fittipaldi	(Brazil) Ruben Fontes	(Brazil) Giuliano Losacco	Medley-A.Mattheis
11	(Rio de Janeiro (state)) Jacarepaguá	13 November	(Brazil) Giuliano Losacco	(Brazil) David Muffato	(Brazil) Giuliano Losacco	Medley-A.Mattheis
12	(São Paulo (state)) Interlagos	27 November	(Brazil) Giuliano Losacco	(Brazil) Thiago Camilo	(Brazil) Hoover Orsi	NasrCastroneves

=== Championship standings ===
Pos	Driver	(São Paulo (state)) INT1	(Paraná (state)) CUR1	(Rio de Janeiro (state)) RIO1	(São Paulo (state)) INT2	(Paraná (state)) CUR2	(Paraná (state)) LON	(Federal District (Brazil)) BRA	(Rio Grande do Sul) SAN	(Rio Grande do Sul) TAR	(Argentina) BUE	(Rio de Janeiro (state)) RIO2	(São Paulo (state)) INT3	Pts
1	(Brazil) Giuliano Losacco	2	4	Ret	11									166
2	(Brazil) Cacá Bueno	1	1	2	5									165
3	(Brazil) Hoover Orsi	Ret	18	5	1									115
4	(Brazil) Antonio Jorge Neto	11	2	25	Ret									107
5	(Brazil) Luciano Burti	3	Ret	7	6									79
6	(Brazil) Duda Pamplona	6	9	Ret	3									74
7	(Brazil) Thiago Camilo	DNS	Ret	1	Ret									71
8	(Brazil) Ingo Hoffmann	Ret	12	9	12									63
9	(Brazil) Ruben Fontes	15	15	6	16									62
10	(Brazil) Pedro Gomes	21	13	Ret	2									62
11	(Brazil) Nonô Figueiredo	4	8	8	Ret									61
12	(Brazil) Valdeno Brito	DNS	3	16	Ret									58
13	(Brazil) Alceu Feldmann	Ret	14	18	7									57
14	(Brazil) Rodrigo Sperafico	5	5	12	Ret									57
15	(Brazil) Thiago Marques	Ret	Ret	4	Ret									55
16	(Brazil) Ricardo Maurício	19	6	20	4									47
17	(Brazil) Chico Serra	Ret	11	11	8									44
18	(Brazil) Felipe Maluhy	Ret	Ret	3	10									43
19	(Brazil) Wagner Ebrahim	10	Ret	21	19									40
20	(Brazil) Beto Giorgi	7	Ret	Ret	Ret									34
21	(Brazil) David Muffato	12	16	10	13									33
22	(Brazil) Sandro Tannuri	DNS	Ret	13	14									33
23	(Brazil) Christian Fittipaldi	18	10	DNS	9									32
24	(Brazil) Guta Negrão	9	Ret	Ret	21									28
25	(Brazil) Matheus Greipel	Ret	22	19	Ret									24
26	(Brazil) Juliano Moro	8	Ret	DNS	Ret									22
27	(Brazil) Raul Boesel	Ret	Ret	22	15									19
28	(Brazil) Fabio Carreira	22	Ret	Ret	Ret									16
29	(Brazil) Popó Bueno	20	7	Ret	Ret									12
30	(Brazil) Adalberto Jardim	24	17	Ret	Ret									8
31	(Brazil) Henrique Favoretto	13	Ret	Ret	Ret									5
32	(Brazil) Diogo Pachenki	14	Ret	Ret	Ret									5
33	(Brazil) Felipe Gama													3
34	(Brazil) Luis Carreira Jr.	Ret	Ret	14	Ret									2
35	(Brazil) Sérgio Paese			15										1
36	(Brazil) Angelo Serafim													1
=	(Brazil) Allam Khodair	16	Ret	Ret	Ret									0
=	(Brazil) Neto de Nigris	17	Ret	DNS	17									0
=	(Brazil) Antonio Stefani	23	19	24	18									0
=	(Brazil) Gualter Salles	25	20	17	Ret									0
=	(Brazil) Luis Garcia Jr.	Ret	Ret	23	Ret									0
=	(Brazil) Wanderley Reck Jr.	Ret	21	Ret	20									0
=	(Brazil) Carlos Alves	Ret	Ret											0
=	(Brazil) Paulo Gomes				Ret									0
Pos	Driver	(São Paulo (state)) INT1	(Paraná (state)) CUR1	(Rio de Janeiro (state)) RIO1	(São Paulo (state)) INT2	(Paraná (state)) CUR2	(Paraná (state)) LON	(Federal District (Brazil)) BRA	(Rio Grande do Sul) SAN	(Rio Grande do Sul) TAR	(Argentina) BUE	(Rio de Janeiro (state)) RIO2	(São Paulo (state)) INT3	Pts
