= Felipe Maluhy =

Brazilian racing driver (born 1977)

- Nationality: (Brazil) Brazilian
- Born: Luis Felipe Klinkert Maluhy; July 20, 1977 (age 49) São Paulo, Brazil

Stock Car Brasil career
- Debut season: 2004
- Current team: Bassani Racing
- Car number: 29
- Starts: 99
- Wins: 1
- Poles: 4
- Fastest laps: 1
- Best finish: 4th in 2006

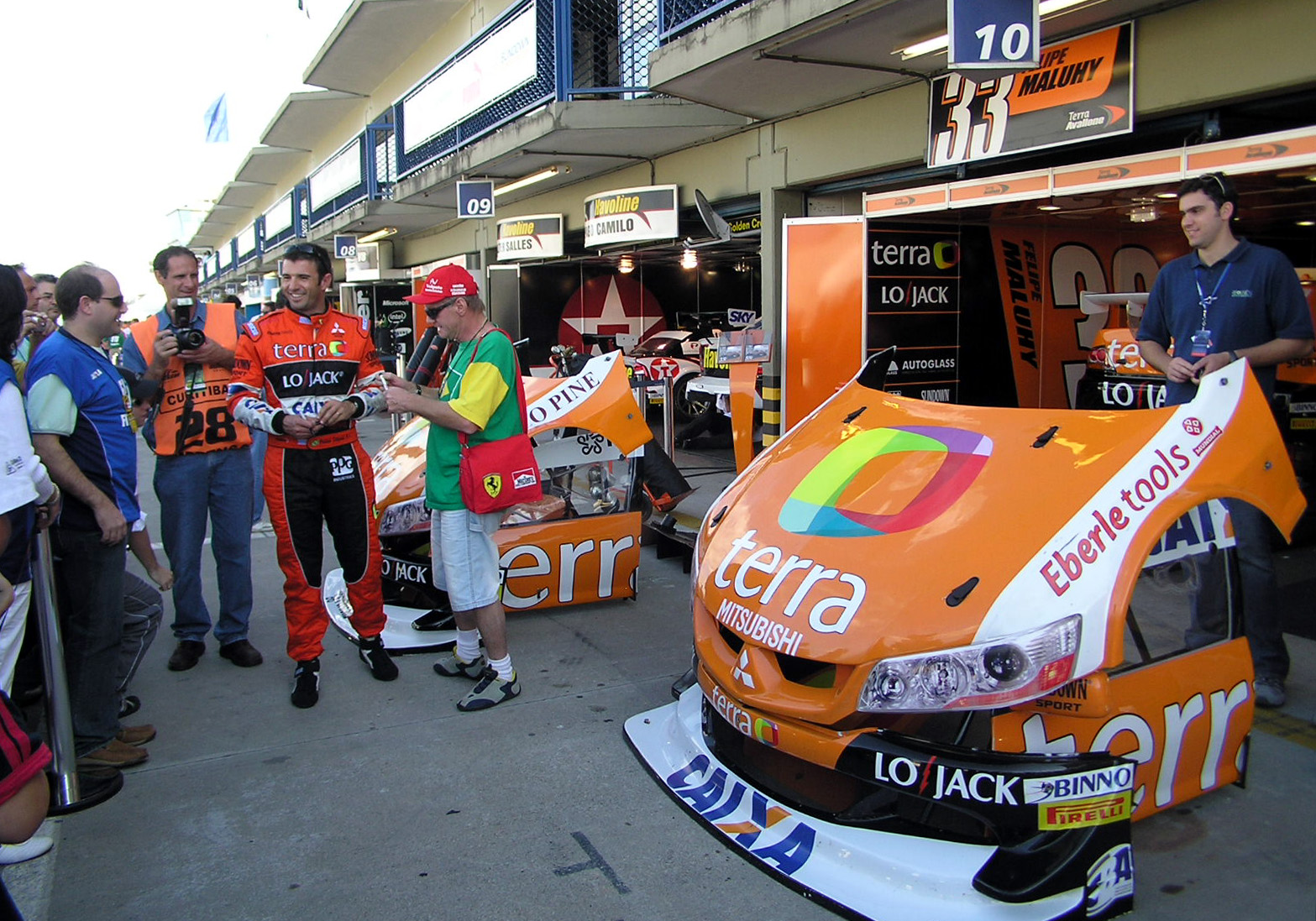
Stock Car V8 Brasil 2006 Terra-Avallone

Luis Felipe Klinkert Maluhy (born 20 July 1977 in São Paulo) is a Brazilian racing driver. He currently competes in the Stock Car Brasil for the Bassani Racing team, driving by Peugeot. Maluhy also competes in the Brasileiro de Marcas for the Officer ProGP team, driving the Mitisubishi Lancer GT.

On fourth race in 2010 at Rio de Janeiro, Maluhy won the first victory in the category.

== Complete Stock Car Brasil results ==
(key) (Races in bold indicate pole position) (Races in italics indicate fastest lap)

Year	Team	Car	1	2	3	4	5	6	7	8	9	10	11	12	Pos	Points
2001	Scuderia 111	Chevrolet Vectra	CTB	TAR	INT	CTB	BSB; 17	INT; 10	RIO; 14	GOI; 17	RIO; 15	CTB	LON	INT	23rd	1
2003	Repsol-Boettger	Chevrolet Vectra	CTB	CGD	INT	RIO	LON	INT; Ret	CTB	CGD	RIO	BSB	CTB	INT	NC	0
2004	Nascar Motorsport	Chevrolet Astra	CTB	INT	TAR	LON	RIO	**INT**; DSQ	CTB; 3	LON; 7	RIO; 11	BSB; 9	CGD; 12	INT; 3	14th	48
2005	Terra-Avallone	Mitsubishi Lancer	INT; Ret	CTB; Ret	RIO; 3	INT; 10	CTB; 15	LON; Ret	BSB; Ret	SCZ; 16	TAR; 13	ARG; Ret	RIO; 9	INT; 7	18th	43
2006	Terra-Avallone	Mitsubishi Lancer	**INT**; 4	CTB; 18	CGD; 14	INT; 8	LON; 8	CTB; 6	SCZ; 5	BSB; 8	TAR; 8	**ARG**; 2	RIO; 10	**INT**; 13	4th	247
2007	Terra-Avallone	Mitsubishi Lancer	INT; 2	CTB; 11	CGD; 27	INT; 7	LON; 16	SCZ; 6	CTB; 18	BSB; 17	ARG; 5	TAR; 8	RIO; 9	INT; 10	4th	240
2008	Terra-Avallone	Mitsubishi Lancer	INT; 9	BSB; 12	CTB; 14	SCZ; 14	CGD; 21	INT; 14	RIO; 12	LON; 27	CTB; 13	BSB; 16	TAR; 22	INT; Ret	21st	24
2009	Avallone Motorsport	Peugeot 307	INT; Ret	CTB; 23	BSB; 11	SCZ; DSQ	INT; 14	SAL; 9	RIO; 16	CGD; 21	CTB; Ret	BSB; 19	TAR; Ret	INT; Ret	25th	14
2010	Officer ProGP	Chevrolet Vectra	INT; 7	CTB; 15	VEL; 9	RIO; 1	RBP; 7	SAL; 11	INT; 16	CGD; Ret	LON; 16	SCZ; 6	BSB; 14	CTB; 6	6th	230
2011	Officer ProGP	Chevrolet Vectra	CTB; 12	INT; 11	RBP; 11	VEL; 4	CGD; 5	RIO; Ret	INT; Ret	SAL; 17	SCZ; 9	LON; 22	BSB; 7	VEL; 4	11th	65
2012	RC3 Bassani	Peugeot 408	INT; 12	CTB; Ret	VEL	RBP	LON	RIO							29th	28
2012	Medley Full Time	Peugeot 408							SAL; 11	CAS; 12	TAR; Ret	CTB	BSB	INT	29th	28
