= Giuliano Losacco =

Brazilian racing driver (born 1977)

- Nationality: (Brazil) Brazilian
- Born: March 17, 1977 (age 49) São Paulo

Stock Car Brasil career
- Debut season: 2003
- Current team: Bassani Racing
- Categorisation: FIA Silver
- Car number: 9
- Former teams: RC Competições; A.Mattheis Motorsport; Vogel Motorsport; JF Racing; Mico’s Racing; Hot Car Competições
- Starts: 103
- Championships: 2 (2004, 2005)
- Wins: 8
- Poles: 9
- Fastest laps: 5

Previous series
- 1998 2000 2006 2007 2007–2008 2011: Eurocup Formula Renault; Formula Three Sudamericana; Autozone West Series; TC 2000; GT3 Brasil Championship; Brasileiro de Marcas

Giuliano Losacco (born March 17, 1977) is a Brazilian racing driver. He is the 2004 and 2005 Stock Car Brasil champion.

== Racing career ==
=== Complete Stock Car Brasil results ===
Year	Team	Car	1	2	3	4	5	6	7	8	9	10	11	12	Pos	Points
2003	ItuPetro RC	Chevrolet Vectra	CTB; 2	CGD; Ret	INT; 8	RIO; Ret	LON; Ret	INT; 1	CTB; Ret	CGD; 6	RIO; Ret	BSB; 2	CTB; 13	INT; 7	8th	95
2004	ItuPetro RC	Chevrolet Astra	CTB; 1	INT; 1	TAR; Ret	LON; 1	RIO; 5	INT; 2	CTB; 2	LON; 1	RIO; 9	BSB; 10	CGD; 14	INT; 5	1st	177
2005	Medley-A.Mattheis	Chevrolet Astra	INT; 2	CTB; 4	RIO; Ret	INT; 11	CTB; Ret	LON; 5	BSB; 2	SCZ; 2	TAR; 7	ARG; 1	RIO; 1	INT; 3	1st	166
2006	Medley-A.Mattheis	Chevrolet Astra	INT; 6	CTB; 3	CGD; Ret	INT; 24	LON; 3	CTB; 3	SCZ; 8	BSB; 22	TAR; 1	ARG; Ret	RIO; 9	INT; Ret	5th	244
2007	Vogel-Texaco	Chevrolet Astra	INT; 9	CTB; 6	CGD; Ret	INT; 8	LON; 15	SCZ; Ret	CTB; Ret	BSB; Ret	ARG; Ret	TAR; 20	RIO; Ret	INT; 12	23rd	30
2008	JF Racing	Peugeot 307	INT; Ret	BSB; 4	CTB; 8	SCZ; 12	CGD; 9	INT; 15	RIO; 25	LON; 2	CTB; 4	BSB; 8	TAR; 24	INT; 16	6th	230
2009	JF Racing	Peugeot 307	INT; 9	CTB; 14	BSB; Ret	SCZ; 15	INT; 4	SAL; 9	RIO; Ret	CGD; 12	CTB; 5	BSB; Ret	TAR; Ret	INT; Ret	18th	39
2010	Mico's Racing	Peugeot 307	INT; Ret	CTB; 11	VEL; Ret	RIO; 21	RBP; 6	SAL; 13	INT; Ret	CGD; 14	LON; 5	SCZ; 17	BSB; 24	CTB; Ret	21st	32
2011	Bardahl Hot Car	Chevrolet Vectra	CTB; 10	INT; Ret	RBP; 12	VEL; 10	CGD; 12	RIO; 21	INT; Ret	SAL; 10	SCZ; Ret	LON; 13	BSB; 4	VEL; 10	16th	49
2012	RC3 Bassani	Peugeot 408	INT; 18	CTB; 17	VEL	RBP	LON	RIO							27th	33
2012	Shell Racing	Peugeot 408							SAL; 24	CAS; Ret	TAR; 12	CTB; 11	BSB; 14	INT	27th	33

Sporting positions
Preceded by David Muffato	Stock Car Brasil champion 2004–2005	Succeeded by Cacá Bueno
