= David Muffato =

Brazilian racing driver (born 1971)

- Nationality: (Brazil) Brazilian
- Born: David Guilherme Muffato; June 16, 1971 (age 55) Paraná

Stock Car Brasil career
- Debut season: 2001
- Current team: Carlos Alves Competições
- Car number: 30
- Former teams: Boettger Competições; RS Competições; Amir Nars Racing; RC3 Bassani Racing; Itaipava Racing Team
- Starts: 143
- Wins: 4
- Poles: 2
- Best finish: Champion in 2003

David Guilherme Muffato (born June 16, 1971 in Cascavel, Paraná) is a Brazilian racing driver. He won the Stock Car Brasil in 2003.

== Complete Stock Car Brasil results ==
(key) (Races in bold indicate pole position) (Races in italics indicate fastest lap)

Year	Team	Car	1	2	3	4	5	6	7	8	9	10	11	12	Pos	Points
2001	Repsol-Boettger	Chevrolet Vectra	CTB; Ret	TAR; 2	INT; Ret	CTB; 14	BSB; Ret	INT; Ret	RIO; 9	GOI; Ret	RIO; 4	CTB; 4	LON; 10	INT; 2	7th	53
2002	Repsol-Boettger	Chevrolet Vectra	RIO; Ret	CTB; 4	INT; Ret	LON; 3	CGD; 3	INT; 15	RIO; 10	GUA; Ret	BSB; 7	CTB; 8	LON; 19	INT; 9	9th	77
2003	Repsol-Boettger	Chevrolet Vectra	CTB; Ret	CGD; 1	INT; 1	RIO; 1	LON; DSQ	INT; EX	CTB; 8	**CGD**; 1	RIO; 2	BSB; 4	CTB; Ret	INT; 4	**1st**	**125**
2004	Repsol-Boettger	Chevrolet Astra	CTB; Ret	INT; 11	TAR; 5	LON; 11	RIO; 18	INT; 8	CTB; 12	LON; Ret	RIO; 4	BSB; 3	CGD; 4	INT; Ret	7th	78
2005	Boettger Competições	Chevrolet Astra	INT; 12	CTB; 16	RIO; 10	INT; 13	CTB; 16	LON; Ret	BSB; 6	SCZ; Ret	TAR; Ret	ARG; 14	RIO; 27	INT; 8	21st	33
2006	NasrCastroneves	Volkswagen Bora	INT; Ret	CTB; 2	CGD; Ret	**INT**; Ret	LON; Ret	CTB; 10	SCZ; 13	BSB; 27	TAR; 3	ARG; 8	RIO; Ret	INT; Ret	12th	58
2007	RS Competições	Volkswagen Bora	INT; Ret	CTB; 18											20th	39
2007	RC3 Bassani	Peugeot 307			CGD; Ret	INT; Ret	LON; Ret	SCZ; 25	CTB; 7	BSB; 6	ARG; 16	TAR; 18	RIO; 3	INT; 13	20th	39
2008	RC3 Bassani	Peugeot 307	INT; 7	BSB; Ret	CTB; Ret	SCZ; 23	CGD; Ret	INT; 21	RIO; 7	LON; 11	CTB; 15	BSB; Ret	TAR; DSQ	INT; Ret	21st	24
2009	RC3 Bassani	Peugeot 307	INT; 12	CTB; 18	BSB; 6	SCZ; 18	INT; 20	SAL; Ret	RIO; 15	CGD; 15	CTB; 22	BSB; 24	TAR; 12	INT; 7	23rd	29
2010	Itaipava Racing Team	Peugeot 307	INT; Ret	CTB; Ret	VEL; Ret	RIO; 5	RBP; 25	SAL; 19	INT; 26	CGD; 6	LON; Ret	SCZ; 11	BSB; 6	CTB; Ret	19th	39
2011	Itaipava Racing Team	Peugeot 307	CTB; 8	INT; 6	RBP; 20	VEL; 12	CGD; Ret	RIO; 16	INT; 12	SAL; 6	SCZ; Ret	LON; 11	BSB; 8	VEL; 3	11th	65
2012	Itaipava Racing Team	Peugeot 408	INT; 13	CTB; 12	VEL; 13	RBP; 16	LON; 19	RIO; 19	SAL; Ret	CGD; 20	TAR; 23	CTB; 17	BSB; 26	INT; 21	25th	43

Sporting positions
Preceded by Ingo Hoffmann	Stock Car Brasil champion 2003	Succeeded by Giuliano Losacco
