= Ruben Carrapatoso =

Brazilian race driver

Ruben Carrapatoso (born 29 July 1981 in São Paulo) is a Brazilian race driver, that competed in various series, including the Stock Car Brasil and in one season of the Formula 3 Euro Series. He was CIK-FIA world champion in 1998.
