= AMattheis Motorsport =

(Brazil) A.Mattheis Motorsport
- Founded: 1995
- Former names: Medley-A.Mattheis; Red Bull Racing; Ipiranga Racing
- Base: Petrópolis, Rio de Janeiro
- Team principal(s): Andreas Mattheis
- Current series: Stock Car Brasil; Império Endurance Brasil
- Current drivers: Ipiranga Racing; 30. Cesar Ramos; 21. Thiago Camilo; AMattheis Motorspoprt; 6. Helio Castroneves
- Noted drivers: Giuliano Losacco; Ricardo Maurício; Cacá Bueno
- Drivers' Championships: Stock Car Pro Series; 2005. Giuliano Losacco(Medley-A.Mattheis); 2008. Ricardo Maurício((Medley-WA Mattheis); 2009. Cacá Bueno(Red Bull WA-Mattheis); 2011. Cacá Bueno(Red Bull WA-Mattheis); 2012. Cacá Bueno(Red Bull A-Mattheis)
- Website: http://www.amattheismotorsport.com/

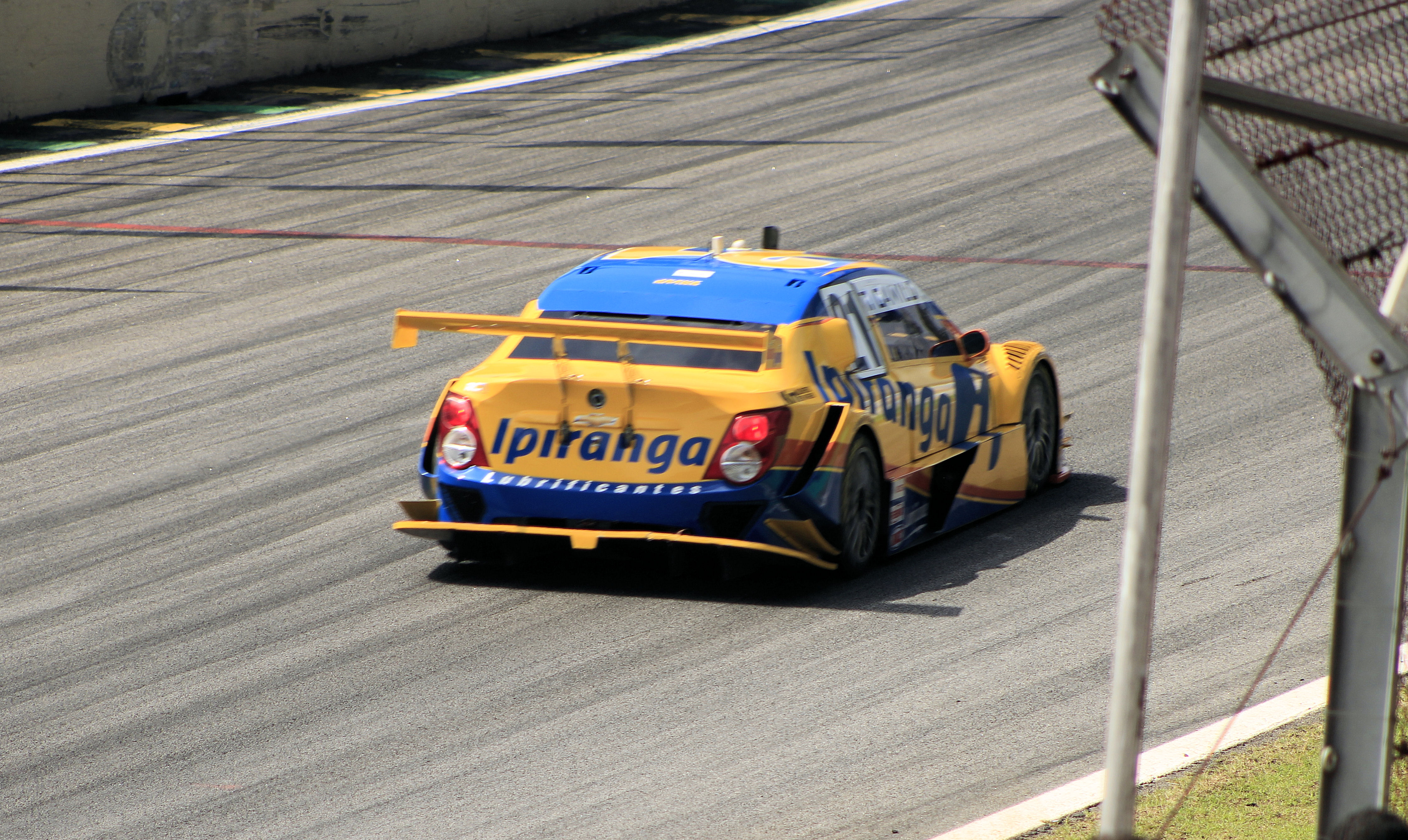
The #21 Ipiranga Racing Chevrolet Sonic being driven by Thiago Camilo at Interlagos

AMattheis Motorsport, currently competing as Mercado Livre Racing due to sponsorship reasons, (Note: In Stock Car Brasil) is a Brazilian auto racing team based in Petropolis, Rio de Janeiro, that currently competes in Stock Car Brasil and Império Endurance Brasil. The team was sponsored by Red Bull from 2009 to 2016 and was sponsored by Brazilian fuel company Ipiranga in Stock Car. From 2026 onwards, the team is sponsored by Mercado Livre.A.Mattheis is among the most successful Stock Car Brasil teams, winning championships in 2005, 2008, 2009, 2011, 2012.

== History ==
The team was formed in 1994 by team principal and then racing driver Andreas Mattheis. The team won the 2005 Stock Car championship with Giuliano Losacco. Since 2007 the team expanded his operations to four cars and created a subsidiary called WA Mattheis. In 2009 the team signed a sponsorship deal with Red Bull, that lasted until 2016. During this period, the team won the 2009, 2011, and 2012 season with Cacá Bueno.

== Results ==
=== Stock Car Pro Series ===
Year	Chassis	Tyres	Drivers	Races	Wins	Poles	F. Laps	Podiums	D.C.	Pts	T.C.	Pts
2020	Toyota Corolla Stock Car	P	(Brazil) César Ramos	18	0	0	0	2	5th	237	N/A	475
2020	Toyota Corolla Stock Car	P	(Brazil) Thiago Camilo	18	3	0	2	4	4th	238	N/A	475
2021	Toyota Corolla Stock Car	P	(Brazil) César Ramos	24	0	0	1	5	9th	245	N/A	555
2021	Toyota Corolla Stock Car	P	(Brazil) Thiago Camilo	24	4	0	2	7	3rd	310	N/A	555
2022	Toyota Corolla Stock Car	P	(Brazil) César Ramos	23	1	0	1	6	9th	230	4th	444
2022	Toyota Corolla Stock Car	P	(Brazil) Thiago Camilo	23	0	0	0	4	10th	216	4th	444
2023	Toyota Corolla Stock Car	H	(Brazil) César Ramos	24	1	1	1	2	11th	209	N/A	489
2023	Toyota Corolla Stock Car	H	(Brazil) Thiago Camilo	24	2	1	1	2	4th	280	N/A	489

== See also ==
- WA Mattheis
- R.Mattheis Motorsport
