= Scuderia Chiarelli =

(Brazil) Scuderia Chiarelli
- Founded: 2001 (as Scuderia 111); 2021(as Scuderia Chiarelli)
- Team principal(s): Carlos Chiarelli
- Current series: Stock Car Pro Series; Império Endurance Brasil; Copa Truck
- Former series: Stock Light; TCR South America

Scuderia Chiarelli previous known as Scuderia 111 is a Brazilian Stock Car Pro Series team based in São Paulo. The team debuted in Stock Car Pro Series in 2001. The team competed with two victories from 2001 to 2007, but was absent for three seasons, returning in 2011.After many difficulties the team left the series and focus in Brazilian Endurance races.

In 2021 after ten season absent the team returned changed its name to Scuderia Chiarelli after filling the vacancy that belonged to Piquet Sports.
