= Boettger Competições =

Brazilian auto racing team

(Brazil) Boettger Competições
- Founded: 1986
- Folded: 2016
- Team principal(s): Ereneu Boettger
- Current series: Stock Car Brasil

Boettger Competições was a Brazilian motorsport team owned Ereneu Boettger. in 2003 the team won the Stock Car Brasil Championship with David Muffato, driving a Chevrolet Vectra.
