= Autódromo Internacional Orlando Moura =

Race track in Campo Grande, Brazil

Autódromo Internacional de Campo Grande
- Original Circuit (2001–present)
- Location: Campo Grande, Mato Grosso do Sul, Brazil
- Coordinates: 20°28′33″S 54°27′56″W
- Opened: 5 August 2001; 24 years ago
- Major events: Current: Copa Truck (2017–2019, 2024–present); Former: Stock Car Pro Series (2002–2004, 2006–2011, 2015, 2018–2019, 2025); NASCAR Brasil (2024–2025); Fórmula Truck (2001, 2003–2008, 2010, 2015–2016, 2023–2025); Fórmula 3 Brasil (2015); Campeonato Brasiliero de GT (2011–2012); F3 Sudamericana (2001–2003, 2005, 2009–2011)

Full Circuit (2009–present)
- Length: 3.533 km (2.195 mi)
- Turns: 10
- Race lap record: 1:18.090 ( (Brazil) Pedro Piquet, Dallara F309, 2015, F3)

Original Circuit (2001–present)
- Length: 3.443 km (2.139 mi)
- Turns: 10
- Race lap record: 1:18.600 ( (Brazil) Marcelo Thomaz, Dallara F301, 2005, F3)

Autódromo Internacional de Campo Grande is a motorsports circuit located in Campo Grande, Brazil. Till 2011 the circuit was one of the hosts of the South American Formula Three series, namely the Formula 3 Sudamericana.

== Lap records ==
As of October 2025, the fastest official lap records at the Autódromo Internacional de Campo Grande are listed as:

Category	Time	Driver	Vehicle	Event
Full Circuit (2009–present): 3.533 km (2.195 mi)
Formula Three	1:18.090	Pedro Piquet	Dallara F309	2015 Campo Grande F3 Brasil round
Stock Car Brasil	1:21.459	Cacá Bueno	Chevrolet Cruze Stock Car	2018 Campo Grande Stock Car Brasil round
GT3	1:24.549	Allam Khodair	Lamborghini Gallardo LP600 GT3	2011 Campo Grande GT Brasil round
GT4	1:31.336	Alan Hellmeister	Aston Martin Vantage GT4	2011 Campo Grande GT Brasil round
Stock Light	1:32.603	Pedro Cardoso	Chevrolet Cruze JL-G12	2018 Campo Grande Stock Light round
NASCAR Brasil	1:36.096	Cayan Chianca	Chevrolet Camaro SS	2025 Campo Grande NASCAR Brasil round
Turismo Nacional BR	1:41.180	João Cardoso	Chevrolet New Onix	2025 Campo Grande Turismo Nacional Brasil round
Truck racing	1:47.531	Leandro Totti	Volkswagen Truck	2015 Campo Grande Fórmula Truck round
Original Circuit (2001–present): 3.443 km (2.139 mi)
Formula Three	1:18.600	Marcelo Thomaz	Dallara F301	2005 Campo Grande F3 Sudamericana round
Formula Renault 2.0	1:23.410	Nelson Merlo	Tatuus FR2000	2005 Campo Grande Formula Renault 2.0 Brazil round
Stock Car Brasil	1:27.379	Chico Serra	Chevrolet Astra	2004 Campo Grande Stock Car Brasil round
