= 2015 Stock Car Brasil season =

Car racing competition

The 2015 Circuito Schin Stock Car Brasil season was the thirty-seventh season of the Stock Car Brasil. The season began at the Goiânia in March and ended at the Interlagos in December. The 2015 Stock Car Brasil consists of four main support championships which support the championship at almost every round, along with several smaller championships supporting one or two events. Marcos Gomes was the champion of the season.

== Teams and drivers ==
Season entries
Manufacturer	Team	No.	Driver	Rounds
Chevrolet Sonic	Red Bull Racing	0	(Brazil) Cacá Bueno	1–5, 7–12
Chevrolet Sonic	Red Bull Racing	29	(Brazil) Daniel Serra	All
Chevrolet Sonic	Red Bull Racing	91	(Belgium) Laurens Vanthoor	6
Chevrolet Sonic	Vogel Motorsport	5	(Brazil) Denis Navarro	All
Chevrolet Sonic	Vogel Motorsport	70	(Brazil) Diego Nunes	All
Chevrolet Sonic	RZ Motorsport	8	(Brazil) Rafael Suzuki	All
Chevrolet Sonic	RZ Motorsport	14	(Brazil) Luciano Burti	All
Chevrolet Sonic	ProGP	9	(Brazil) Gustavo Lima	5–12
Chevrolet Sonic	ProGP	33	(Brazil) Felipe Maluhy	1
Chevrolet Sonic	Shell Racing	10	(Brazil) Ricardo Zonta	All
Chevrolet Sonic	Shell Racing	77	(Brazil) Valdeno Brito	All
Chevrolet Sonic	TMG Racing	12	(Brazil) Lucas Foresti	1–11
Chevrolet Sonic	TMG Racing	42	(Brazil) Constantino Júnior	12
Chevrolet Sonic	TMG Racing	51	(Brazil) Átila Abreu	All
Chevrolet Sonic	Bardahl Hot Car	16	(Argentina) Mauro Giallombardo	10–11
Chevrolet Sonic	Bardahl Hot Car	26	(Brazil) Raphael Abbate	All
Chevrolet Sonic	Bardahl Hot Car	69	(Brazil) Beto Monteiro	12
Chevrolet Sonic	Bardahl Hot Car	72	(Brazil) Fábio Fogaça	1–9
Chevrolet Sonic	Full Time Sports	118	(Brazil) Allam Khodair	All
Chevrolet Sonic	Full Time Sports	111	(Brazil) Rubens Barrichello	All
Chevrolet Sonic	Ipiranga-RCM	21	(Brazil) Thiago Camilo	All
Chevrolet Sonic	Ipiranga-RCM	28	(Brazil) Galid Osman	All
Chevrolet Sonic	Eurofarma RC	65	(Brazil) Max Wilson	All
Chevrolet Sonic	Eurofarma RC	90	(Brazil) Ricardo Maurício	All
Chevrolet Sonic	C2 Team	73	(Brazil) Sérgio Jimenez	All
Chevrolet Sonic	C2 Team	83	(Brazil) Gabriel Casagrande	All
Peugeot 408	Prati-Donaduzzi	1	(Brazil) Antônio Pizzonia	All
Peugeot 408	Prati-Donaduzzi	4	(Brazil) Júlio Campos	All
Peugeot 408	Schin Racing Team	2	(Brazil) Raphael Matos	1–11
Peugeot 408	Schin Racing Team	63	(Argentina) Néstor Girolami	12
Peugeot 408	Schin Racing Team	110	(Brazil) Felipe Lapenna	All
Peugeot 408	União Química Bassani	3	(Brazil) Bia Figueiredo	All
Peugeot 408	União Química Bassani	25	(Brazil) Tuka Rocha	All
Peugeot 408	Cavaleiro Sports	11	(Brazil) César Ramos	All
Peugeot 408	Cavaleiro Sports	74	(Brazil) Popó Bueno	All
Peugeot 408	Boettger Competições	46	(Brazil) Vitor Genz	All
Peugeot 408	Boettger Competições	66	(Brazil) Felipe Guimarães	10–12
Peugeot 408	Boettger Competições	82	(Brazil) Alceu Feldmann	1
Peugeot 408	Boettger Competições	777	(Brazil) Pedro Boesel	7
Peugeot 408	Voxx Racing	80	(Brazil) Marcos Gomes	All
Peugeot 408	Voxx Racing	88	(Brazil) Felipe Fraga	All

First round entries
Team	No	Season driver	Wildcard driver
Red Bull Racing	0	(Brazil) Cacá Bueno	(Argentina) José María López
Red Bull Racing	29	(Brazil) Daniel Serra	(Brazil) Chico Serra
Prati-Donaduzzi	1	(Brazil) Antônio Pizzonia	(Brazil) Bruno Senna
Prati-Donaduzzi	4	(Brazil) Júlio Campos	(France) Nicolas Prost
Schin Racing Team	2	(Brazil) Raphael Matos	(Brazil) David Muffato
Schin Racing Team	110	(Brazil) Felipe Lapenna	(Italy) Vitantonio Liuzzi
União Química Racing	3	(Brazil) Bia Figueiredo	(Argentina) Matias Milla
União Química Racing	25	(Brazil) Tuka Rocha	(New Zealand) Chris van der Drift
Vogel Motorsport	5	(Brazil) Denis Navarro	(Brazil) Felipe Giaffone
Vogel Motorsport	70	(Brazil) Diego Nunes	(Brazil) Ricardo Rosset
RZ Motorsport	8	(Brazil) Rafael Suzuki	(Mexico) Antonio Pérez
RZ Motorsport	14	(Brazil) Luciano Burti	(Spain) Jaime Alguersuari
Shell Racing	10	(Brazil) Ricardo Zonta	(Canada) Jacques Villeneuve
Shell Racing	77	(Brazil) Valdeno Brito	(Belgium) Laurens Vanthoor
Cavaleiro Racing	11	(Brazil) César Ramos	(Belgium) Frédéric Vervisch
Cavaleiro Racing	74	(Brazil) Popó Bueno	(Brazil) Guilherme Salas
AMG Motorsport	12	(Brazil) Lucas Foresti	(Brazil) Luiz Razia
AMG Motorsport	51	(Brazil) Átila Abreu	(Brazil) Nelson Piquet Jr.
Full Time Sports	18	(Brazil) Allam Khodair	(Portugal) António Félix da Costa
Full Time Sports	111	(Brazil) Rubens Barrichello	(Brazil) Ingo Hoffmann
Ipiranga-RCM	21	(Brazil) Thiago Camilo	(Brazil) Lucas di Grassi
Ipiranga-RCM	28	(Brazil) Galid Osman	(Brazil) Beto Monteiro
Hot Car Competições	26	(Brazil) Raphael Abbate	(Brazil) Nicolas Costa
Hot Car Competições	72	(Brazil) Fábio Fogaça	(Brazil) Leandro Totti
ProGP	33	(Brazil) Felipe Maluhy	(Brazil) Xandinho Negrão
Boettger Competições	46	(Brazil) Vítor Genz	(Brazil) Matheus Stumpf
Boettger Competições	82	(Brazil) Alceu Feldmann	(Argentina) Ezequiel Bosio
Eurofarma RC	65	(Brazil) Max Wilson	(Brazil) Vítor Meira
Eurofarma RC	90	(Brazil) Ricardo Maurício	(Argentina) Néstor Girolami
C2 Team	73	(Brazil) Sérgio Jimenez	(Brazil) Fábio Carbone
C2 Team	83	(Brazil) Gabriel Casagrande	(Brazil) Enrique Bernoldi
Voxx Racing	80	(Brazil) Marcos Gomes	(Australia) Mark Winterbottom
Voxx Racing	88	(Brazil) Felipe Fraga	(Portugal) Álvaro Parente

=== Team changes ===
- AMG Motorsport return for the official name after Mobil reduced support in the team.
- Hanier Racing is now called Cavaleiro Racing with the acquisition of 100% of corporate shares by Beto Cavaleiro. Textiles Hanier left the championship.
- ProGP scaled back to a single car operation.
- RC3 Bassani returned to operating as a two-car team and the team changed name to União Química Bassani for sponsorship reasons.

=== Driver changes ===
==== Changed teams ====
- Popó Bueno left Shell Racing and joined Total Racing.
- Luciano Burti changed teams from Vogel Motorsport to RZ Motorsport.
- Fábio Fogaça left the Schin Racing Team and moved to Hot Car Competições.
- Alceu Feldmann returned to Boettger Competições, having competed for the team from 2005 to 2009.
- Bia Figueiredo and Rafael Suzuki, who raced for ProGP in 2014, will join União Química Racing and RZ Motorsport respectively.
- Lucas Foresti switched from RC3 Bassani to AMG Motorsport.
- Felipe Fraga and Marcos Gomes joined Voxx Racing, leaving Vogel Motorsport and the Schin Racing Team respectively.
- Sérgio Jimenez left Voxx Racing to race for the Axalta C2 Team.
- Felipe Lapenna and Raphael Matos left Hot Car Competições to join the Schin Racing Team.
- Denis Navarro and Diego Nunes joined Vogel Motorsport, leaving Voxx Racing and the Axalta C2 Team respectively.
- Tuka Rocha left RZ Motorsport and moved to União Quimica Racing.
- After seven seasons racing for his own team, Ricardo Zonta switched to Shell Racing.

==== Entering/re-entering the series ====
- Campeonato Brasileiro de Turismo runner-up Raphael Abbate will debut in the series, with Hot Car Competições.
- César Ramos, who competed for Belgian Audi Club Team WRT in the Blancpain Endurance and Sprint championships in 2014, joined Total Racing in 2015. Ramos competed as a wildcard at the first round in 2014, with Ipiranga-RCM.

==== Leaving the series ====
- Beto Cavaleiro will not return to the series in 2015, and will focus on running the Cavaleiro Racing.
- Nonô Figueiredo announced his retirement from Stock Car after three wins and fifteen seasons.
- Lico Kaesemodel, Felipe Tozzo, Mauri Zacarelli, Wellington Justino, Felipe Gama and Vicente Orige competed part-time in 2014 and will not return in 2015.

=== In-season changes ===
- After first round ProGP did not compete until fourth round, returning at fifth round with the rookie Gustavo Lima.
- Alceu Feldmann leaves Boettger Competições after first round. Boettger return to operate two cars in seventh round with Pedro Boesel and the last three rounds with Felipe Guimarães.
- Cacá Bueno had been suspended in court after offending the marshals on team radio after his victory in the first race at Ribeirão Preto - when he crossed the line, he kept racing in front of Marcos Gomes because the chequered flag was not waved at neither of them in the occasion by mistake. After competing in the first round as a wildcard driver, Laurens Vanthoor replaces Bueno at Red Bull Racing.
- Fábio Fogaça was fired on Hot Car Competições after nine round for poor results, in his place the team called the Argentine driver Mauro Giallombardo for two rounds and Fórmula Truck champion Beto Monteiro for the last round.
- Constantino Júnior return for Stock Car in last round replacing your nephew Lucas Foresti in AMG Motorsport after Foresti received a 30 days preventive suspension for doping.
- Raphael Matos also was suspended for the same reason of Foresti. In his place Schin Racing Team called Argentine driver Néstor Girolami two time Super TC 2000 champion and winner of Stock Car All Star Race at Interlagos with Ricardo Mauricio.

== Race calendar and results ==
The provisional 2015 schedule was announced on 18 November 2014. The seventh edition of the Schin Million was held on August 16 in Goiânia; the season was contested over twenty-one races at twelve rounds, with the first round – also to be held in Goiânia – being contested by two-driver entries with wildcard drivers. The Ribeirão Preto Street Circuit returned to the series after one year off the schedule, and was held in April. Later in the season, it was announced that the race on the Salvador was to be replaced by a race at Curitiba. All races were held in Brazil.

Round		Circuit	Date	Pole position	Fastest lap	Winning driver	Winning team
1		Autódromo Internacional Ayrton Senna, Goiânia	March 22	(Brazil) Átila Abreu (Brazil) Nelson Piquet Jr.	(Brazil) Ricardo Maurício (Argentina) Néstor Girolami	(Brazil) Ricardo Maurício (Argentina) Néstor Girolami	Eurofarma RC
2	R1	Ribeirão Preto Street Circuit	April 5	(Brazil) Max Wilson	(Brazil) Raphael Matos	(Brazil) Cacá Bueno	Red Bull Racing
2	R2	Ribeirão Preto Street Circuit	April 5	(Brazil) Vítor Genz	(Brazil) Rubens Barrichello	(Brazil) Tuka Rocha	União Química Racing
3	R1	Velopark, Nova Santa Rita	April 26	(Brazil) Marcos Gomes	(Brazil) Rubens Barrichello	(Brazil) Daniel Serra	Red Bull Racing
3	R2	Velopark, Nova Santa Rita	April 26	(Brazil) Max Wilson	(Brazil) Ricardo Maurício	(Brazil) Max Wilson	Eurofarma RC
4	R1	Autódromo Internacional de Curitiba	May 31	(Brazil) Galid Osman	(Brazil) Marcos Gomes	(Brazil) Daniel Serra	Red Bull Racing
4	R2	Autódromo Internacional de Curitiba	May 31	(Brazil) Valdeno Brito	(Brazil) Lucas Foresti	(Brazil) Júlio Campos	Prati-Donaduzzi
5	R1	Autódromo Internacional de Santa Cruz do Sul	June 28	(Brazil) Valdeno Brito	(Brazil) Felipe Fraga	(Brazil) Marcos Gomes	Voxx Racing
5	R2	Autódromo Internacional de Santa Cruz do Sul	June 28	(Brazil) Daniel Serra	(Brazil) Cacá Bueno	(Brazil) Valdeno Brito	Shell Racing
6	R1	Autódromo Internacional de Curitiba	August 2	(Brazil) Marcos Gomes	(Brazil) Thiago Camilo	(Brazil) Marcos Gomes	Voxx Racing
6	R2	Autódromo Internacional de Curitiba	August 2	(Brazil) Max Wilson	(Brazil) Marcos Gomes	(Brazil) Sérgio Jimenez	Axalta C2 Team
7		Autódromo Internacional Ayrton Senna, Goiânia	August 16	(Brazil) Marcos Gomes	(Brazil) Daniel Serra	(Brazil) Thiago Camilo	Ipiranga-RCM
8	R1	Autódromo Internacional de Cascavel	August 30	(Brazil) Valdeno Brito	(Brazil) Valdeno Brito	(Brazil) Valdeno Brito	Shell Racing
8	R2	Autódromo Internacional de Cascavel	August 30	(Brazil) Diego Nunes	(Brazil) Ricardo Maurício	(Brazil) Thiago Camilo	Ipiranga-RCM
9	R1	Autódromo Internacional Orlando Moura	September 13	(Brazil) Marcos Gomes	(Brazil) Allam Khodair	(Brazil) Marcos Gomes	Voxx Racing
9	R2	Autódromo Internacional Orlando Moura	September 13	(Brazil) Cacá Bueno	(Brazil) Ricardo Maurício	(Brazil) Felipe Fraga	Voxx Racing
10	R1	Autódromo Internacional de Curitiba	October 18	(Brazil) Marcos Gomes	(Brazil) Lucas Foresti	(Brazil) Lucas Foresti	AMG Motorsport
10	R2	Autódromo Internacional de Curitiba	October 18	(Brazil) Denis Navarro	(Brazil) Felipe Fraga	(Brazil) Max Wilson	Eurofarma RC
11	R1	Autódromo Internacional de Tarumã	November 8	(Brazil) Allam Khodair	(Brazil) Felipe Fraga	(Brazil) Allam Khodair	Full Time Sports
11	R2	Autódromo Internacional de Tarumã	November 8	(Brazil) Vítor Genz	(Brazil) Rubens Barrichello	(Brazil) Cacá Bueno	Red Bull Racing
12		Interlagos Circuit	December 13	(Brazil) Valdeno Brito	(Brazil) Átila Abreu	(Brazil) Átila Abreu	AMG Motorsport

== Championship standings ==
Points system

Points were awarded for each race at an event, to the driver/s of a car that completed at least 75% of the race distance and was running at the completion of the race, up to a maximum of 48 points per event.

Points format	Position																			
Points format	1st	2nd	3rd	4th	5th	6th	7th	8th	9th	10th	11th	12th	13th	14th	15th	16th	17th	18th	19th	20th
Dual race	12	11	10	9	8	7	6	5	4	3	2	1	0							
Feature races	24	20	18	17	16	15	14	13	12	11	10	9	8	7	6	5	4	3	2	1
Sprint races	15	13	12	11	10	9	8	7	6	5	4	3	2	1	0					
Final race	48	40	36	34	32	30	28	26	24	22	20	18	16	14	12	10	8	6	4	2

- Dual Race: Used for the first round with Wildcard drivers.
- Feature races: Used for the first race of each event and the Stock Car Million race.
- Sprint races: Used for the second race of each event, with partially reversed (top ten) grid.
- Final race: Used for the last round of the season with double points.

=== Drivers' Championship ===
Pos	Driver	GOI1	RBP		VEL		CUR1		SCZ		CUR2		GOI2	CAS		CAM		CUR3		TAR		INT	Pts
1	(Brazil) Marcos Gomes	2	2	DSQ	**2**	18	2	13	1	5	**1**	5	**4**	6	6	**1**	11	**Ret**	4	3	11	22	242
2	(Brazil) Cacá Bueno	4	1	Ret	5	2	7	5	6	3	EX (Note: Bueno was suspended after offending the marshals on team radio after his victory in the first race at Ribeirão Preto - when he crossed the line, he kept racing in front of Marcos Gomes because the chequered flag was not waved at neither of them in the occasion by mistake. Because of the suspension, Laurens Vanthoor's participation in the second Curibita round is not as a guest driver (ineligible for points), but as a regular driver (racing for points).)		9	5	5	10	**2**	13	Ret	9	1	20	212
3	(Brazil) Thiago Camilo	5	5	15	12	10	3	12	18	10	Ret	DNS	1	7	1	3	17	6	3	Ret	Ret	7	193
4	(Brazil) Rubens Barrichello	14	8	6	4	5	9	2	3	Ret	11	8	20	23	10	5	4	12	6	6	2	Ret	188
5	(Brazil) Allam Khodair	3	9	12	7	14	Ret	21	2	9	2	Ret	Ret	3	7	2	7	2	Ret	**1**	Ret	Ret	184
6	(Brazil) Daniel Serra	12	Ret	DNS	1	4	1	Ret	10	**2**	3	4	2	25	DNS	7	6	Ret	Ret	8	3	Ret	181
7	(Brazil) Ricardo Maurício	1	4	Ret	6	20	Ret	Ret	4	6	DSQ	DSQ	Ret	4	3	4	3	3	2	7	Ret	Ret	173
8	(Brazil) Max Wilson	6	**6**	Ret	10	**1**	Ret	DNS	5	4	11	**6**	6	27	12	8	5	11	1	Ret	14	Ret	162
9	(Brazil) Felipe Fraga	7	14	DNS	14	DNS	15	15	11	22	Ret	DNS	5	12	13	6	1	Ret	5	2	Ret	3	159
10	(Brazil) Átila Abreu	**28**	19	3	16	22	16	6	13	Ret	4	Ret	11	9	DNS	14	13	DSQ	11	17	5	1	155
11	(Brazil) Júlio Campos	9	3	8	3	3	8	1	Ret	16	5	2	16	29	DNS	9	20	15	8	Ret	7	Ret	154
12	(Brazil) Valdeno Brito	8	DSQ	Ret	11	Ret	10	**18**	**8**	1	DSQ	EX	7	**1**	2	12	9	21	Ret	4	4	**Ret**	148
13	(Brazil) Ricardo Zonta	21	Ret	Ret	13	8	24	Ret	12	14	6	18	3	2	14	11	12	Ret	9	5	9	8	147
14	(Brazil) Diego Nunes	Ret	11	14	8	DNS	11	17	Ret	DNS	7	3	10	10	**9**	19	DNS	Ret	14	13	Ret	2	139
15	(Brazil) Vitor Genz	17	10	**7**	22	9	Ret	DNS	15	12	21	12	18	13	4	21	16	5	20	10	**10**	5	124
16	(Brazil) Gabriel Casagrande	20	DSQ	10	Ret	7	13	23	9	7	Ret	7	24	22	DNS	18	14	8	Ret	11	Ret	4	110
17	(Brazil) Sérgio Jimenez	10	13	2	9	16	22	DNS	Ret	13	9	1	Ret	8	Ret	13	8	14	10	18	Ret	21	108
18	(Brazil) Antônio Pizzonia	25	12	9	24	12	4	11	Ret	Ret	14	9	17	26	11	16	Ret	18	7	14	13	16	95
19	(Brazil) Luciano Burti	16	21	5	Ret	13	12	16	Ret	11	20	13	Ret	16	8	20	10	4	21	12	15	11	93
20	(Brazil) Galid Osman	11	7	13	Ret	21	**5**	14	14	17	8	17	14	Ret	DNS	Ret	21	Ret	13	15	Ret	10	92
21	(Brazil) Denis Navarro	Ret	24	4	Ret	23	14	19	7	20	22	Ret	21	15	26	Ret	DNS	10	**Ret**	Ret	16	6	79
22	(Brazil) César Ramos	Ret	Ret	Ret	Ret	DNS	18	7	22	8	Ret	DNS	12	17	16	Ret	Ret	20	12	Ret	8	9	66
23	(Brazil) Tuka Rocha	26	15	1	Ret	Ret	23	9	21	Ret	18	10	15	30	DNS	Ret	Ret	9	19	20	18	19	58
24	(Brazil) Raphael Matos	13	18	Ret	17	Ret	6	20	16	19	Ret	DNS	8	11	25	Ret	DNS	Ret	Ret	16	Ret		55
25	(Brazil) Popó Bueno	Ret	Ret	Ret	21	11	17	3	Ret	DNS	12	16	Ret	31	19	Ret	22	Ret	16	Ret	6	14	52
26	(Brazil) Lucas Foresti	15	Ret	Ret	20	15	Ret	4	Ret	Ret	15	15	13	18	18	Ret	DNS	1	18	22	Ret		53
27	(Brazil) Rafael Suzuki	27	16	11	15	19	19	22	19	18	13	11	19	28	15	17	18	7	17	Ret	DNS	Ret	51
28	(Brazil) Felipe Lapenna	23	17	Ret	18	6	Ret	DNS	Ret	Ret	Ret	DNS	26	14	24	15	23	17	Ret	21	12	17	44
29	(Brazil) Raphael Abbate	22	22	16	19	DNS	21	8	17	21	16	14	27	21	21	22	15	16	Ret	Ret	Ret	13	40
30	(Brazil) Felipe Guimarães																	19	15	Ret	Ret	15	14
31	(Brazil) Bia Figueiredo	19	20	DNS	23	17	20	10	24	DNS	Ret	DNS	Ret	24	22	Ret	DNS	Ret	Ret	23	Ret	18	13
32	(Brazil) Gustavo Lima								23	15	17	Ret	25	20	20	23	19	22	Ret	Ret	17	DSQ	5
33	(Brazil) Fábio Fogaça	24	23	Ret	Ret	Ret	Ret	Ret	20	Ret	Ret	DNS	22	19	17	Ret	DNS						3
34	(Argentina) Mauro Giallombardo																	Ret	Ret	19	19		2
35	(Belgium) Laurens Vanthoor	8									19	Ret											2
	(Brazil) Alceu Feldmann	18																					0
	(Brazil) Pedro Boesel												23										0
	(Brazil) Felipe Maluhy	Ret																					0
Guest drivers ineligible to score points
	(Argentina) Néstor Girolami	1																				12	
	(Australia) Mark Winterbottom	2																					
	(Portugal) António Félix da Costa	3																					
	(Argentina) José María López	4																					
	(Brazil) Lucas di Grassi	5																					
	(Brazil) Vítor Meira	6																					
	(Portugal) Álvaro Parente	7																					
	(France) Nicolas Prost	9																					
	(Brazil) Fábio Carbone	10																					
	(Brazil) Beto Monteiro	11																				Ret	
	(Brazil) Chico Serra	12																					
	(Brazil) David Muffato	13																					
	(Brazil) Ingo Hoffmann	14																					
	(Brazil) Luiz Razia	15																					
	(Spain) Jaime Alguersuari	16																					
	(Brazil) Matheus Stumpf	17																					
	(Argentina) Ezequiel Bosio	18																					
	(Argentina) Matias Milla	19																					
	(Brazil) Enrique Bernoldi	20																					
	(Canada) Jacques Villeneuve	21																					
	(Brazil) Nicolas Costa	22																					
	(Italy) Vitantonio Liuzzi	23																					
	(Brazil) Leandro Totti	24																					
	(Brazil) Bruno Senna	25																					
	(New Zealand) Chris van der Drift	26																					
	(Mexico) Antonio Pérez	27†																					
	(Brazil) Nelson Piquet Jr.	**28**†																					
	(Brazil) Guilherme Salas	Ret																					
	(Brazil) Ricardo Rosset	Ret																					
	(Belgium) Frédéric Vervisch	Ret																					
	(Brazil) Felipe Giaffone	Ret																					
	(Brazil) Xandinho Negrão	Ret																					
	(Brazil) Constantino Júnior																					Ret	
Pos	Driver	GOI1	RBP		VEL		CUR1		SCZ		CUR2		GOI2	CAS		CAM		CUR3		TAR		INT	Pts

Colour	Result
Gold	Winner
Silver	Second place
Bronze	Third place
Green	Points classification
Blue	Non-points classification
Blue	Non-classified finish (NC)
Purple	Retired, not classified (Ret)
Red	Did not qualify (DNQ)
Red	Did not pre-qualify (DNPQ)
Black	Disqualified (DSQ)
White	Did not start (DNS)
White	Withdrew (WD)
White	Race cancelled (C)
Blank	Did not practice (DNP)
Blank	Did not arrive (DNA)
Blank	Excluded (EX)

**Bold** – Pole position
Italics – Fastest lap
† – Retired, but classified

=== Teams' Championship ===
Pos	Team	No.	GOI1	RBP		VEL		CUR1		SCZ		CUR2	GOI2	CAS	CAM	CUR3	TAR	INT	Pts
1	Red Bull Racing	0	4	1	Ret	5	2	7	5	6	3								197
1	Red Bull Racing	29	12	Ret	DNS	1	4	1	Ret	10	2								197
2	Full Time Sports	18	3	9	12	7	14	Ret	21†	2	9								158
2	Full Time Sports	111	14	8	6	4	5	9	2	3	Ret								158
3	Eurofarma RC	65	6	**6**	Ret	10	1	Ret	DNS	5	4								145
3	Eurofarma RC	90	1	4	Ret	6	20	NC	Ret	4	6								145
4	Voxx Racing	80	2	2	DSQ	**2**	18	2	13	1	5								143
4	Voxx Racing	88	7	14	DNS	14	DNS	15	15	11	22								143
5	Prati-Donaduzzi	1	25	12	9	24	12	4	11	NC	Ret								126
5	Prati-Donaduzzi	4	9	3	8	3	3	8	1	NC	16								126
6	Ipiranga-RCM	21	5	5	15	12	10	3	12	18	10								109
6	Ipiranga-RCM	28	11	7	13	NC	21†	**5**	14	14	17								109
7	Shell Racing	10	21	NC	Ret	13	8	24	Ret	12	14								79
7	Shell Racing	77	8	DSQ	Ret	11	Ret	10	18	**8**	1								79
7	Axalta C2 Team	73	10	13	2	9	16	22†	DNS	NC	13								79
7	Axalta C2 Team	83	20	DSQ	10	NC	7	13	23†	9	7								79
9	Vogel Motorsport	5	Ret	24	4	Ret	23†	14	19	7	20								66
9	Vogel Motorsport	70	Ret	11	14	8	DNS	11	17†	Ret	DNS								66
10	AMG Motorsport	12	15	Ret	Ret	20†	15	NC	4	NC	Ret								53
10	AMG Motorsport	51	**28**†	19	3	16	22	16	6	13	Ret								53
11	RZ Motorsport	8	27†	16	11	15	19	19	22†	19	18								44
11	RZ Motorsport	14	16	21	5	NC	13	12	16	NC	11								44
12	Schin Racing Team	2	13	18	Ret	17	Ret	6	20†	16	19								43
12	Schin Racing Team	110	23	17	Ret	18	6	Ret	DNS	NC	Ret								43
13	Total Racing	11	Ret	Ret	Ret	Ret	DNS	18	7	22	8								38
13	Total Racing	74	Ret	NC	Ret	21†	11	17	3	NC	DNS								38
14	União Química Racing	3	19	20†	DNS	23	17	20	10	24†	DNS								34
14	União Química Racing	25	26	15	1	Ret	Ret	23†	9	21	Ret								34
14	Boettger Competições	46	17	10	7	22†	9	Ret	DNS	15	12								34
14	Boettger Competições	82	18																34
16	Hot Car Competições	26	22	22	16†	19	DNS	21†	8	17	21								14
16	Hot Car Competições	72	24	23	Ret	NC	Ret	Ret	Ret	20	Ret								14
	ProGP	9								23	15								
	ProGP	33	Ret																
Pos	Team	No.	GOI1	RBP		VEL		CUR1		SCZ		CUR2	GOI2	CAS	CAM	CUR3	TAR	INT	Pts

Colour	Result
Gold	Winner
Silver	Second place
Bronze	Third place
Green	Points classification
Blue	Non-points classification
Blue	Non-classified finish (NC)
Purple	Retired, not classified (Ret)
Red	Did not qualify (DNQ)
Red	Did not pre-qualify (DNPQ)
Black	Disqualified (DSQ)
White	Did not start (DNS)
White	Withdrew (WD)
White	Race cancelled (C)
Blank	Did not practice (DNP)
Blank	Did not arrive (DNA)
Blank	Excluded (EX)
