= 2013 Stock Car Brasil season =

Car racing competition

Seasons
- ← 2012 2014 →

The 2013 Stock Car Brasil season was the 35th Stock Car Brasil season. It began on March 3 at the Interlagos and ended on December 15 at the same circuit, after twelve rounds. Pirelli return to the championship after a five-season absence, replacing Goodyear as tyre supplier.

== Teams and drivers ==
All drivers were Brazilian-registered.

Manufacturer	Team	No.	Driver	Rounds
Chevrolet Sonic	Red Bull Racing	0	Cacá Bueno	All
Chevrolet Sonic	Red Bull Racing	29	Daniel Serra	All
Chevrolet Sonic	Bardahl Hot Car	2	Raphael Matos	All
Chevrolet Sonic	Bardahl Hot Car	26	Wellington Justino	All
Chevrolet Sonic	GT Team Raízen	22	Bruno Senna	12
Chevrolet Sonic	RZ Motorsport	10	Ricardo Zonta	All
Chevrolet Sonic	RZ Motorsport	25	Tuka Rocha	All
Chevrolet Sonic	Mobil Super Pioneer Racing	11	Nonô Figueiredo	All
Chevrolet Sonic	Mobil Super Pioneer Racing	51	Átila Abreu	All
Chevrolet Sonic	Vogel Motorsport	18	Allam Khodair	All
Chevrolet Sonic	Vogel Motorsport	72	Fábio Fogaça	All
Chevrolet Sonic	Officer ProGP	20	Ricardo Sperafico	All
Chevrolet Sonic	Officer ProGP	23	Duda Pamplona	All
Chevrolet Sonic	Ipiranga-RCM	21	Thiago Camilo	All
Chevrolet Sonic	Ipiranga-RCM	28	Galid Osman	All
Chevrolet Sonic	Eurofarma RC	65	Max Wilson	All
Chevrolet Sonic	Eurofarma RC	90	Ricardo Maurício	All
Chevrolet Sonic	Full Time Sports	82	Alceu Feldmann	All
Chevrolet Sonic	Full Time Sports	111	Rubens Barrichello	All
Peugeot 408	Gramacho Competições	3	Rodrigo Pimenta	All
Peugeot 408	Gramacho Competições	46	Vitor Genz	All
Peugeot 408	Prati-Donaduzzi	4	Júlio Campos	All
Peugeot 408	Prati-Donaduzzi	19	Rodrigo Sperafico	All
Peugeot 408	Voxx Racing	5	Denis Navarro	All
Peugeot 408	Voxx Racing	73	Sérgio Jimenez	All
Peugeot 408	Hanier Racing	7	Beto Cavaleiro	All
Peugeot 408	Hanier Racing	27	Felipe Lapenna	All
Peugeot 408	RC3 Bassani	8	Patrick Gonçalves	1–4
Peugeot 408	RC3 Bassani	42	Lucas Foresti	11–12
Peugeot 408	RC3 Bassani	70	Diego Nunes	All
Peugeot 408	RC3 Bassani	83	Gabriel Casagrande	8–10
Peugeot 408	Boettger Competições	14	Luciano Burti	All
Peugeot 408	Boettger Competições	63	Lico Kaesemodel	All
Peugeot 408	Shell Racing	34	Hélio Castroneves	7
Peugeot 408	Shell Racing	74	Popó Bueno	All
Peugeot 408	Shell Racing	77	Valdeno Brito	All
Peugeot 408	Schin Racing Team	35	David Muffato	All
Peugeot 408	Schin Racing Team	80	Marcos Gomes	All

=== Team changes ===
- William Lube and Andreas Mattheis owners of Shell Racing-WA Mattheis ended the partnership. Mattheis began sharing the team's command with his son Rodolhpo Mattheis and changed its official name to R.Mattheis Motorsport, but, sponsor's reasons continue to like Shell Racing. Lube alongside Cimed Group purchased the JF Racing and created a new team Voxx Racing.
- Pharmaceutical company Cimed forms a new team by buying the JF team. They recruited drivers Sérgio Jimenez and Denis Navarro.
- After three seasons of partnership, Boettger Competições and Itaipava broke up. Boettger will revert to using its original name in 2013.
- Gramacho Competições will return for the championship after two seasons.
- Textiles Hanier and racing driver Beto Cavaleiro purchased the cars of FTS Competições, who called BMC Racing in 2012 and created Hanier Racing. The team will switch from entering a Chevrolet to the Peugeot for its 2013 campaign. BMC group continues in the championship in partner with RZ Motorsport.
- After racing as "Medley Full Time" in 2011 and 2012, Full Time Sports will revert to using its original name in 2013. The team will move from Chevrolet in 2013.
- RCM Motorsport competing under the name Ipiranga-RCM. Due sponsor reasons.
- Due to sponsorship reasons, Carlos Alves Competições was renamed to the Shin Racing Team.

=== Driver changes ===
- Rubens Barrichello, who competed in the last three races of the 2012 season for Medley Full Time, stayed for the full season in 2013, driving for Full Time Sports.
- Pedro Boesel and Antônio Pizzonia lost their seats after Comprafacil Nascar JF withdrew from the championship.
- Popó Bueno left Linea Sucrolose to join Shell Racing.
- Júlio Campos moved from Carlos Alves Competições to Prati-Donaduzzi.
- Claudio Capparelli, Fabio Carbone, Hélio Castroneves, Rafael Daniel, Diego Freitas, Bruno Junqueira, Tony Kanaan, Giuliano Losacco, Felipe Maluhy, Rodrigo Navarro, Pedro Nunes, Diogo Pachenki, Cláudio Ricci and Matheus Stumpf, who competed part-time or as a guest in 2012, did not return for the championship in 2013.
- Beto Cavaleiro entered in the Stock Car Brasil with newcoming team Hanier Racing.
- Alceu Feldmann was suspended with twenty-four months for doping in 2012, but the sentence was reduced for nine months and Feldmann signed with Full Time Sports.
- Fábio Fogaça, who competed in 2012 Stock Car Corrida do Milhão, raced with Vogel Motorsport in 2013.
- Vitor Genz made his debut in Stock Car Brasil with Gramacho Competições.
- After six months of suspension for doping, Marcos Gomes moved to Carlos Alves Competições for the 2013 season.
- Patrick Gonçalves, who competed part-time in 2012, moved to RC3 Bassani in 2013.
- Sérgio Jimenez, who was third place in the 2012 Brazilian GT Championship season joined Voxx Racing.
- Wellington Justino returned for the championship with Hot Car Competições.
- Lico Kaesemodel moved from RCM Motorsport to Boettger Competições.
- Felipe Lapenna made his debut in the category with Hanier Racing.
- Eduardo Leite lost his seat at Hot Car Competições.
- Raphael Matos, who competed part-time with Bassani Racing in 2012, joined Hot Car Competições in 2013.
- Vítor Meira lost his seat at Officer ProGP.
- David Muffato movee from Itaipava Racing Team to Carlos Alves Competições.
- Denis Navarro, who competed for Vogel Motorsport in 2012, moved to newcoming team Voxx Racing.
- Xandinho Negrão lost his seat at Medley Full Time.
- Diego Nunes movee from Hot Car Competições to RC3 Bassani.
- Galid Osman signed with Ipiranga-RCM after a season with BMC Racing.
- Rodrigo Pimenta, who was runner-up in the 2012 Stock Car Brasil second-tier, continued his association with Gramacho Competições.
- Tuka Rocha, who drove for FTS Competições-BMC Racing in 2012, moved to RZ Motorsport-BMC Racing for the 2013 season.
- Ricardo Sperafico moved from Prati-Donaduzzi Racing to Officer ProGP.

==== Mid-season changes ====
- IndyCar Series driver Hélio Castroneves was supposed to participate in the seventh round at Ribeirão Preto for Shell Racing but did not start. In 2012 he competed in the last round of the season.
- Patrick Gonçalves did not return for RC3 Bassani after the fourth round at Salvador. Stock Car Brasil second tier driver Gabriel Casagrande replaced Gonçalves prior to the eighth round at Cascavel. After competing in Formula Renault 3.5, Lucas Foresti replaces Casagrande at Brasília, for his Stock Car début.
- FIA WEC Aston Martin Racing driver Bruno Senna competed as a guest in the Stock Car Brasil Million Race for Shell Racing-GT Team Raízen.

== Race calendar and results ==
A twelve-round calendar was announced on 5 December 2012, with Brasília host two races and Goiânia receiving the category after eleven seasons. Londrina and Rio de Janeiro that the track was to be demolished will not host a race in 2013. Also was confirmed the fifth edition of Stock Car Corrida do Milhão at last round of the season.

In July, the round of Goiânia was removed from the calendar, and replaced with a second race at Cascavel. The round scheduled to be held in Brasília was moved to November. All races were held in Brazil.

Round	Circuit	Date	Pole position	Fastest lap	Winning driver	Winning team
1	Interlagos Circuit	March 3	Júlio Campos	Valdeno Brito	Cacá Bueno	Red Bull Racing
2	Autódromo Internacional de Curitiba	March 17	Ricardo Maurício	Ricardo Zonta	Daniel Serra	Red Bull Racing
3	Autódromo Internacional de Tarumã	April 28	Daniel Serra	Daniel Serra	Daniel Serra	Red Bull Racing
4	Circuito Ayrton Senna, Salvador	May 19	Átila Abreu	Átila Abreu	Ricardo Mauricio	Eurofarma RC
5	Autódromo Internacional Nelson Piquet, Brasília	June 2	Thiago Camilo	Ricardo Sperafico	Cacá Bueno	Red Bull Racing
6	Autodromo Internacional de Cascavel	June 16	Marcos Gomes	Marcos Gomes	Marcos Gomes	Carlos Alves Competições
7	Ribeirão Preto Street Circuit	August 11	Átila Abreu	Átila Abreu	Thiago Camilo	Ipiranga-RCM
8	Autodromo Internacional de Cascavel	September 1	Rubens Barrichello	Rubens Barrichello	Marcos Gomes	Carlos Alves Competições
9	Velopark, Nova Santa Rita	September 15	Cacá Bueno	Daniel Serra	Daniel Serra	Red Bull Racing
10	Autódromo Internacional de Curitiba	October 20	Átila Abreu	Daniel Serra	Átila Abreu	Mobil Super Pioneer Racing
11	Autódromo Internacional Nelson Piquet, Brasília	November 10	Sérgio Jimenez	Popó Bueno	Thiago Camilo	Ipiranga-RCM
12	Interlagos Circuit	December 15	Allam Khodair	Allam Khodair	Ricardo Zonta	BMC Racing

== Championship standings ==
- Points were awarded as follows:

Position	1	2	3	4	5	6	7	8	9	10	11	12	13	14	15	16	17	18	19	20
Standard	24	20	18	17	16	15	14	13	12	11	10	9	8	7	6	5	4	3	2	1
Round 12	48	40	36	34	32	30	28	26	24	22	20	18	16	14	12	10	8	6	4	2

=== Drivers' Championship ===
Pos	Driver	INT1	CUR1	TAR	SAL	BRA1	CAS1	RBP	CAS2	VEL	CUR2	BRA2	INT2	Pts
1	Ricardo Maurício	3	**2**	3	1	5	6	9	26	2	4	3	2	218
2	Thiago Camilo	19	3	2	3	**3**	9	1	5	8	2	1	6	215
3	Cacá Bueno	1	5	5	4	1	11	4	7	**15**	5	25	3	196
4	Daniel Serra	4	1	**1**	12	2	5	25	2	1	3	12	Ret	181
5	Max Wilson	6	7	13	5	13	18	2	3	6	23	7	5	163
6	Valdeno Brito	2	4	7	27	DSQ	10	3	10	4	9	9	10	154
7	Ricardo Zonta	23	6	4	28	9	14	18	29	5	8	8	1	144
8	Rubens Barrichello	25	19	20	2	4	13	5	**25**	12	10	11	8	120
9	Sérgio Jimenez	28	9	10	24	16	8	19	4	9	6	**2**	Ret	107
10	Marcos Gomes	13	21	Ret	7	DSQ	**1**	23	1	3	7	Ret	Ret	102
11	Átila Abreu	12	8	18	**23**	DSQ	Ret	**10**	28	Ret	**1**	6	9	99
12	Luciano Burti	8	23	12	8	DSQ	15	Ret	6	11	Ret	Ret	7	94
13	Raphael Matos	10	26	16	26	10	19	6	8	16	18	10	18	84
14	Allam Khodair	7	18	8	17	20	DSQ	Ret	DSQ	Ret	12	23	**4**	78
15	Nonô Figueiredo	24	14	17	6	DSQ	25	7	9	Ret	DSQ	17	11	76
16	Tuka Rocha	5	12	DNS	14	7	16	14	15	Ret	14	19	28	73
17	Diego Nunes	16	Ret	Ret	20	22	4	15	11	7	11	13	Ret	71
18	Júlio Campos	**Ret**	11	6	Ret	DSQ	2	8	12	Ret	22	Ret	Ret	67
19	Galid Osman	11	15	Ret	13	8	17	16	20	23	21	4	Ret	64
20	Denis Navarro	26	13	27	Ret	12	DNS	11	14	14	13	Ret	14	63
21	Ricardo Sperafico	14	28	11	Ret	Ret	3	20	24	Ret	25	Ret	12	54
21	Lico Kaesemodel	15	17	Ret	21	15	26	Ret	Ret	Ret	15	5	13	54
23	Rodrigo Sperafico	Ret	10	14	19	6	21	21	21	13	17	DSQ	19	53
23	Duda Pamplona	20	DSQ	9	11	14	DSQ	Ret	13	Ret	DSQ	16	17	53
25	Popó Bueno	21	16	22	9	DSQ	DSQ	13	16	10	16	18	22	49
26	Fabio Fogaça	9	20	15	16	Ret	12	26	19	19	24	Ret	20	41
27	Alceu Feldmann	29	27	21	15	11	23	12	27	Ret	Ret	20	21	28
28	Felipe Lapenna	Ret	25	Ret	10	Ret	Ret	Ret	Ret	17	27	22	16	27
29	David Muffato	Ret	29	24	29	Ret	7	17	17	18	Ret	DSQ	24	25
30	Vitor Genz	18	24	19	18	21	20	22	DSQ	Ret	20	15	26	16
31	Rodrigo Pimenta	22	22	25	Ret	18	Ret	Ret	DSQ	20	19	14	25	13
32	Wellington Justino	17	32	23	22	17	22	Ret	22	21	26	21	Ret	8
33	Gabriel Casagrande								18	22	Ret			3
34	Beto Cavaleiro	27	30	26	25	19	24	24	23	Ret	DSQ	24	27	2
	Lucas Foresti											Ret	23	0
	Patrick Gonçalves	Ret	31	DNS	Ret									0
Drivers ineligible to score points
	Bruno Senna												15	0
	Hélio Castroneves							DNS						0
Pos	Team	INT1	CUR1	TAR	SAL	BRA1	CAS1	RBP	CAS2	VEL	CUR2	BRA2	INT2	Pts

Colour	Result
Gold	Winner
Silver	Second place
Bronze	Third place
Green	Points classification
Blue	Non-points classification
Blue	Non-classified finish (NC)
Purple	Retired, not classified (Ret)
Red	Did not qualify (DNQ)
Red	Did not pre-qualify (DNPQ)
Black	Disqualified (DSQ)
White	Did not start (DNS)
White	Withdrew (WD)
White	Race cancelled (C)
Blank	Did not practice (DNP)
Blank	Did not arrive (DNA)
Blank	Excluded (EX)

**Bold** – Pole
Italics – Fastest Lap

=== Teams' Championship ===
Pos	Team	INT1	CUR1	TAR	SAL	BRA1	CAS1	RBP	CAS2	VEL	CUR2	BRA2	INT2	Pts
1	Eurofarma RC	3	2	3	1	5	6	2	3	2	4	3	2	381
1	Eurofarma RC	6	7	13	5	13	18	9	26	6	23	7	5	381
2	Red Bull Racing	1	1	1	4	1	5	4	2	1	3	12	3	377
2	Red Bull Racing	4	5	5	12	2	11	25	7	15	5	25	Ret	377
3	Ipiranga-RCM	11	3	2	3	3	9	1	5	8	2	1	6	279
3	Ipiranga-RCM	19	15	Ret	13	8	17	16	20	23	21	4	Ret	279
4	BMC Racing	5	6	4	14	7	14	14	15	5	8	8	1	217
4	BMC Racing	23	12	DNS	28	9	16	18	29	Ret	14	19	28	217
5	Shell Racing	2	4	7	9	DSQ	10	3	10	4	9	9	10	203
5	Shell Racing	21	16	22	27	DSQ	DSQ	13	16	10	16	18	22	203
6	Mobil Super Pioneer Racing	12	8	17	6	DSQ	25	7	9	Ret	1	6	9	175
6	Mobil Super Pioneer Racing	24	14	18	23	DSQ	Ret	10	28	Ret	DSQ	17	11	175
7	Voxx Racing	26	9	10	24	12	8	11	4	9	6	2	14	170
7	Voxx Racing	28	13	27	Ret	16	DNS	19	14	14	13	Ret	Ret	170
8	Full Time Sports	25	19	20	2	4	13	5	25	12	10	11	8	148
8	Full Time Sports	29	27	21	15	11	26	12	27	Ret	Ret	20	21	148
8	Boettger Competições	8	17	12	8	15	15	Ret	6	11	15	5	7	148
8	Boettger Competições	15	23	Ret	21	DSQ	26	Ret	Ret	Ret	Ret	Ret	13	148
10	Carlos Alves Competições	13	21	24	7	Ret	1	17	1	3	7	Ret	24	127
10	Carlos Alves Competições	Ret	29	Ret	29	DSQ	7	23	17	18	Ret	DSQ	Ret	127
11	Prati-Donaduzzi	Ret	10	6	19	6	2	8	12	13	17	Ret	19	122
11	Prati-Donaduzzi	Ret	11	14	Ret	DSQ	21	21	21	Ret	22	DSQ	Ret	122
12	Vogel Motorsport	7	18	8	16	20	12	26	19	19	12	23	4	119
12	Vogel Motorsport	9	20	15	17	Ret	DSQ	Ret	DSQ	Ret	24	Ret	20	119
13	Officer ProGP	14	28	9	11	14	3	20	13	Ret	25	16	12	107
13	Officer ProGP	20	DSQ	11	Ret	Ret	DSQ	Ret	24	Ret	DSQ	Ret	17	107
14	Hot Car Competições	10	26	16	22	10	19	6	8	16	18	10	18	92
14	Hot Car Competições	17	32	23	26	17	22	31	22	21	26	21	Ret	92
15	RC3 Bassani	16	31	Ret	20	22	4	15	11	7	11	13	23	74
15	RC3 Bassani	Ret	Ret	DNS	Ret				18	22	Ret	Ret	Ret	74
16	Hanier Racing	27	25	26	10	19	24	24	23	17	27	22	16	29
16	Hanier Racing	Ret	30	Ret	25	Ret	Ret	Ret	Ret	Ret	DSQ	24	27	29
16	Gramacho Competições	18	22	19	18	18	20	22	DSQ	20	19	14	25	29
16	Gramacho Competições	22	24	25	Ret	21	Ret	Ret	DSQ	Ret	20	15	26	29
Team ineligible to score points
	GT Team Raízen												15	0
Pos	Team	INT1	CUR1	TAR	SAL	BRA1	CAS1	RBP	CAS2	VEL	CUR2	BRA2	INT2	Pts

Colour	Result
Gold	Winner
Silver	Second place
Bronze	Third place
Green	Points classification
Blue	Non-points classification
Blue	Non-classified finish (NC)
Purple	Retired, not classified (Ret)
Red	Did not qualify (DNQ)
Red	Did not pre-qualify (DNPQ)
Black	Disqualified (DSQ)
White	Did not start (DNS)
White	Withdrew (WD)
White	Race cancelled (C)
Blank	Did not practice (DNP)
Blank	Did not arrive (DNA)
Blank	Excluded (EX)
