= 2012 Stock Car Brasil season =

Car racing competition

Seasons
- ← 2011 2013 →

The 2012 Copa Caixa Stock Car season was from the 34th Stock Car Brasil season. It began on March 25 at the Interlagos and ended on December 9 at the same circuit, after twelve rounds. Chevrolet, came to have Chevrolet Sonic as representation of the manufacturer. The category announced changes for 2012 season, excluding the super final and system of dropped. The scoring system was change with the top twenty drivers in each race are awarded points on a scale of 22, 20, 18, 17, 16, 15, 14, 13, 12, 11, 10, 9, 8, 7, 6, 5, 4, 3, 2 and 1.

After Cacá Bueno, Átila Abreu, Daniel Serra, Ricardo Maurício, Max Wilson, Valdeno Brito and Nonô Figueiredo arrived at 2012 Stock Car Corrida do Milhão with title chances, Bueno of Red Bull Racing won his fifth title. Maurício finished the championship in second place and Abreu in third place.

== Teams and drivers ==
All drivers were Brazilian-registered.

Manufacturer	Team	No.	Driver	Rounds
Chevrolet Sonic	Red Bull Racing	0	Cacá Bueno	All
Chevrolet Sonic	Red Bull Racing	29	Daniel Serra	All
Chevrolet Sonic	Vogel Motorsport	5	Denis Navarro	All
Chevrolet Sonic	Vogel Motorsport	18	Allam Khodair	All
Chevrolet Sonic	Officer ProGP	6	Vítor Meira	All
Chevrolet Sonic	Officer ProGP	23	Duda Pamplona	All
Chevrolet Sonic	RZ Motorsport	10	Ricardo Zonta	All
Chevrolet Sonic	RZ Motorsport	74	Popó Bueno	All
Chevrolet Sonic	Mobil Super Pioneer Racing	11	Nonô Figueiredo	All
Chevrolet Sonic	Mobil Super Pioneer Racing	51	Átila Abreu	All
Chevrolet Sonic	Bardahl Hot Car	16	Diego Nunes	All
Chevrolet Sonic	Bardahl Hot Car	37	Eduardo Leite	All
Chevrolet Sonic	RCM Motorsport	21	Thiago Camilo	All
Chevrolet Sonic	RCM Motorsport	63	Lico Kaesemodel	All
Chevrolet Sonic	BMC Racing	25	Tuka Rocha	All
Chevrolet Sonic	BMC Racing	28	Galid Osman	All
Chevrolet Sonic	Eurofarma RC	65	Max Wilson	All
Chevrolet Sonic	Eurofarma RC	90	Ricardo Maurício	All
Peugeot 408	JF Racing	1	Antônio Pizzonia	All
Peugeot 408	JF Racing	88	Pedro Boesel	All
Peugeot 408	RC3 Bassani	2	Pedro Nunes	5
Peugeot 408	RC3 Bassani	2	Raphael Matos	11–12
Peugeot 408	RC3 Bassani	3	Rafael Daniel	5–6
Peugeot 408	RC3 Bassani	9	Giuliano Losacco	1–2
Peugeot 408	RC3 Bassani	12	Bruno Junqueira	7
Peugeot 408	RC3 Bassani	15	Diogo Pachenki	8
Peugeot 408	RC3 Bassani	30	Cláudio Ricci	8–9
Peugeot 408	RC3 Bassani	33	Felipe Maluhy	1–2
Peugeot 408	RC3 Bassani	41	Diego Freitas	7
Peugeot 408	RC3 Bassani	45	Fabio Carbone	10
Peugeot 408	RC3 Bassani	57	Claudio Capparelli	6, 10
Peugeot 408	RC3 Bassani	89	Matheus Stumpf	9
Peugeot 408	RC3 Bassani	100	Tony Kanaan	11–12
Peugeot 408	Shell Racing	3	Hélio Castroneves	12
Peugeot 408	Shell Racing	7	Alceu Feldmann	1–6
Peugeot 408	Shell Racing	9	Giuliano Losacco	7–11
Peugeot 408	Shell Racing	77	Valdeno Brito	All
Peugeot 408	Carlos Alves Competições	4	Júlio Campos	All
Peugeot 408	Carlos Alves Competições	8	Patrick Gonçalves	5–11
Peugeot 408	Carlos Alves Competições	22	Rodrigo Navarro	1–2
Peugeot 408	Carlos Alves Competições	72	Fábio Fogaça	12
Peugeot 408	Itaipava Racing Team	14	Luciano Burti	All
Peugeot 408	Itaipava Racing Team	35	David Muffato	All
Peugeot 408	Medley Full Time	17	Rubens Barrichello	10–12
Peugeot 408	Medley Full Time	33	Felipe Maluhy	7–9
Peugeot 408	Medley Full Time	80	Marcos Gomes	1–6
Peugeot 408	Medley Full Time	99	Xandinho Negrão	All
Peugeot 408	Prati-Mico's Racing	19	Rodrigo Sperafico	All
Peugeot 408	Prati-Mico's Racing	20	Ricardo Sperafico	All

=== Team changes ===
- Teams of Andreas Mattheis switched places. Mattheis passed Red Bull Racing to A.Mattheis Motorsport and after three seasons and two titles with Red Bull, WA Matheis had a new sponsor of Royal Dutch Shell and renamed the team to Shell Racing.
- Mico's Racing returned after only one race in 2011 with Jacques Villeneuve under Shell V-Power Racing. The team was renamed to Prati-Donaduzzi due sponsor reasons.
- Amir Nasr left the championship after eight seasons.
- JF started a partner with Nascar Motorsport and was renamed to Comprafacil Nascar JF.
- RZ Motorsport returned to his official name, after Crystal left the championship.
- FTS Competições and Mobil Super Pioneer parted. Mobil group started a partnership with AMG Motorsport, renaming the team Mobil Super Pioneer Racing and back to operate two cars. FTS Competições started a partner with BMC Group.
- Carlos Alves Competições returned to the championship after four seasons. Having sold his car to Carlos Alves, Scuderia 111 left the series.

=== Driver changes ===
- Cacá Bueno and Daniel Serra still in Mattheis-Red Bull Racing, but, now in A.Mattheis Motorsport after three seasons in WA Mattheis.
- Antonio Pizzonia, who raced part time in 2011, moves to Comprafacil JF Nascar. Stock Car Brasil second tier driver Pedro Boesel debuted in the series like Pizzonia's partner.
- Denis Navarro moves from RC3 Bassani to Vogel Motorsport in the place of Tuka Rocha, that moves to FTS BMC Racing. Galid Osman returned to the championship like Rocha partner.
- Vítor Meira debuted in the series in Officer ProGP replacing Felipe Maluhy, that moves to RC3 Bassani.
- Popó Bueno moves from A.Mattheis Motorsport to RZ Motorsport. In his place at Shell-A.Mattheis entered Valdeno Brito, that left FTS Esso Mobil Super Racing.
- Nono Figueiredo moves from FTS Esso Mobil Super Racing to AMG Esso Mobil Super Racing.
- Diego Nunes moves from RC3 Bassani to Bardahl Hot Car replacing Giuliano Losacco, that moves to RC3 Bassani.
- Júlio Campos, who raced for Scuderia 111 and RZ Crystal Racing Team, in 2012 he will race for Carlos Alves Competições. Rodrigo Navarro left JF Racing and will be Campos partner.
- Ricardo Sperafico and Rodrigo Sperafico started a partner in Prati-Donaduzzi. Rodrigo left JF Racing Ricardo returned from the championship, after only one race in 2011.

== Race calendar and results ==
All races were held in Brazil.

Round	Circuit	Date	Pole position	Fastest lap	Winning driver	Winning team
1	Interlagos Circuit	March 25	Allam Khodair	Allam Khodair	Cacá Bueno	Red Bull Racing
2	Autódromo Internacional de Curitiba	April 15	Allam Khodair	Nonô Figueiredo	Valdeno Brito	Shell Racing
3	Velopark, Nova Santa Rita	May 6	Cacá Bueno	Cacá Bueno	Cacá Bueno	Red Bull Racing
4	Ribeirão Preto Street Circuit	May 20	Cacá Bueno	Max Wilson	Daniel Serra	Red Bull Racing
5	Autódromo Internacional Ayrton Senna, Londrina	July 1	Cacá Bueno	Luciano Burti	Cacá Bueno	Red Bull Racing
6	Autódromo Internacional Nelson Piquet, Rio de Janeiro	July 15	Allam Khodair	Allam Khodair	Allam Khodair	Vogel Motorsport
7	Circuito Ayrton Senna, Salvador	August 26	Duda Pamplona	Allam Khodair	Allam Khodair	Vogel Motorsport
8	Autodromo Internacional de Cascavel	September 16	Átila Abreu	Valdeno Brito	Valdeno Brito	Shell Racing
9	Autódromo Internacional de Tarumã	September 30	Allam Khodair	Vítor Meira	Thiago Camilo	RCM Motorsport
10	Autódromo Internacional de Curitiba	October 21	Átila Abreu	Allam Khodair	Átila Abreu	Mobil Super Pioneer Racing
11	Autódromo Internacional Nelson Piquet, Brasília	November 11	Thiago Camilo	Thiago Camilo	Max Wilson	Eurofarma RC
12	Interlagos Circuit / Report	December 9	Cacá Bueno	Allam Khodair	Thiago Camilo	RCM Motorsport

== Championship standings ==
- Points were awarded as follows:

Position	1	2	3	4	5	6	7	8	9	10	11	12	13	14	15	16	17	18	19	20
Standard	22	20	18	17	16	15	14	13	12	11	10	9	8	7	6	5	4	3	2	1
Round 12	44	40	36	34	32	30	28	26	24	22	20	18	16	14	12	10	8	6	4	2

=== Drivers' Championship ===
Pos	Driver	INT1	CUR1	VEL	RBP	LON	RIO	SAL	CAS	TAR	CUR2	BRA	INT2	Pts
1	Cacá Bueno	1	Ret	**1**	**2**	**1**	8	5	25	5	5	9	**3**	195
2	Ricardo Maurício	3	4	2	17	5	3	4	19	4	Ret	2	2	189
3	Átila Abreu	5	3	Ret	3	13	Ret	6	**4**	2	**1**	6	8	175
4	Daniel Serra	6	6	4	1	3	13	Ret	17	3	3	7	12	169
5	Thiago Camilo	2	Ret	Ret	6	4	2	7	16	1	Ret	**21**	1	158
6	Max Wilson	24	2	3	20	9	5	9	6	7	13	1	29	138
7	Valdeno Brito	9	1	5	Ret	6	14	Ret	1	6	4	10	27	137
8	Júlio Campos	8	9	19	4	8	11	21	2	24	8	20	4	136
9	Nonô Figueiredo	7	10	9	14	11	6	Ret	5	9	6	3	25	130
10	Allam Khodair	**4**	**18**	Ret	Ret	30	**1**	1	3	**11**	2	24	20	118
11	Luciano Burti	14	7	Ret	8	2	Ret	3	24	13	16	5	15	117
12	Denis Navarro	15	24	7	7	18	7	23	Ret	8	14	16	7	104
13	Ricardo Zonta	26	Ret	6	19	12	24	14	22	10	Ret	8	5	89
14	Duda Pamplona	29	EX	15	Ret	26	9	**2**	8	16	Ret	22	6	86
15	Antônio Pizzonia	30	11	17	Ret	10	4	Ret	26	18	7	25	10	83
16	Galid Osman	17	19	8	13	25	15	13	7	15	10	Ret	26	72
17	Rodrigo Sperafico	16	20	11	15	21	Ret	22	13	29	23	4	13	65
17	Lico Kaesemodel	10	13	Ret	11	14	16	16	10	Ret	Ret	13	Ret	65
19	Ricardo Sperafico	28	14	18	Ret	15	17	8	Ret	29	12	11	17	64
20	Diego Nunes	22	15	10	9	16	Ret	DSQ	11	19	15	12	Ret	61
21	Marcos Gomes	11	5	Ret	5	7	21							56
22	Popó Bueno	Ret	26	Ret	18	17	12	17	23	17	Ret	18	11	49
23	Vítor Meira	27	8	Ret	Ret	24	18	Ret	9	20	9	17	28	45
23	Pedro Boesel	19	21	16	Ret	22	10	15	14	25	Ret	Ret	16	45
25	David Muffato	13	12	13	16	19	19	Ret	20	23	17	26	21	43
26	Tuka Rocha	23	16	Ret	Ret	23	23	12	15	22	20	15	18	37
27	Xandinho Negrão	20	25	14	10	20	22	10	21	Ret	19	28	24	33
27	Giuliano Losacco	18	17					24	Ret	12	11	14		33
29	Felipe Maluhy	12	Ret					11	12	Ret				28
29	Eduardo Leite	21	22	Ret	12	27	20	Ret	Ret	14	18	Ret	19	28
31	Alceu Feldmann	25	23	12	Ret	31	25							9
32	Patrick Gonçalves					29	26	20	18	27	24	27		4
33	Diego Freitas							18						3
34	Bruno Junqueira							19						2
34	Fabio Fogaça												23	2
36	Claudio Capparelli						27				21			0
36	Rafael Daniel					28	Ret							0
36	Rodrigo Navarro	Ret	Ret											0
36	Pedro Nunes					Ret								0
Drivers ineligible to score points
	Raphael Matos											23	9	0
	Hélio Castroneves												14	0
	Tony Kanaan											19	Ret	0
	Rubens Barrichello										22	Ret	22	0
	Cláudio Ricci								Ret	26				0
	Matheus Stumpf									28				0
	Diogo Pachenki								Ret					0
	Fabio Carbone										Ret			0
Pos	Driver	INT1	CUR1	VEL	RBP	LON	RIO	SAL	CAS	TAR	CUR2	BRA	INT2	Pts

Colour	Result
Gold	Winner
Silver	Second place
Bronze	Third place
Green	Points classification
Blue	Non-points classification
Blue	Non-classified finish (NC)
Purple	Retired, not classified (Ret)
Red	Did not qualify (DNQ)
Red	Did not pre-qualify (DNPQ)
Black	Disqualified (DSQ)
White	Did not start (DNS)
White	Withdrew (WD)
White	Race cancelled (C)
Blank	Did not practice (DNP)
Blank	Did not arrive (DNA)
Blank	Excluded (EX)

**Bold** – Pole
Italics – Fastest Lap

=== Teams' Championship ===
Pos	Team	INT1	CUR1	VEL	RBP	LON	RIO	SAL	CAS	TAR	CUR2	BRA	INT2	Pts
1	Red Bull Racing	1	6	1	1	1	8	5	17	3	3	7	3	362
1	Red Bull Racing	6	Ret	4	2	3	13	Ret	25	5	5	9	12	362
2	Eurofarma RC	3	2	2	17	5	3	4	6	4	13	1	2	327
2	Eurofarma RC	24	4	3	20	9	5	9	19	7	Ret	2	29	327
3	Mobil Super Pioneer Racing	5	3	9	3	11	6	6	4	2	1	3	8	305
3	Mobil Super Pioneer Racing	7	10	Ret	14	13	Ret	Ret	5	9	6	6	25	305
4	RCM Motorsport	2	13	Ret	6	4	2	7	10	1	Ret	13	1	223
4	RCM Motorsport	10	Ret	Ret	11	14	16	16	16	Ret	Ret	21	Ret	223
5	Vogel Motorsport	4	18	7	7	18	1	1	3	8	2	16	7	218
5	Vogel Motorsport	15	24	Ret	Ret	30	7	23	Ret	11	14	24	20	218
6	Shell Racing	9	1	5	Ret	6	14	24	1	6	4	10	14	186
6	Shell Racing	25	23	12	Ret	31	25	Ret	Ret	12	11	14	27	186
7	Itaipava Racing Team	13	7	13	8	2	19	3	20	13	16	5	15	152
7	Itaipava Racing Team	14	12	Ret	16	19	Ret	Ret	24	23	17	26	21	152
8	Carlos Alves Competições	8	9	19	4	8	11	20	2	24	8	20	4	140
8	Carlos Alves Competições	Ret	Ret			29	26	21	18	27	24	27	23	140
9	RZ Motorsport	26	26	6	18	12	12	14	22	10	Ret	8	4	136
9	RZ Motorsport	Ret	Ret	Ret	19	17	24	17	23	17	Ret	18	11	136
10	Officer ProGP	27	8	15	Ret	24	9	2	8	16	9	17	6	131
10	Officer ProGP	29	EX	Ret	Ret	26	18	Ret	9	20	Ret	22	28	131
11	Prati-Donaduzzi	16	14	11	15	15	17	8	13	21	12	4	13	123
11	Prati-Donaduzzi	28	20	18	Ret	21	Ret	22	Ret	29	23	11	17	123
12	Comprafacil Nascar JF	19	11	16	Ret	10	4	15	14	18	7	25	10	122
12	Comprafacil Nascar JF	30	21	17	Ret	22	10	Ret	26	25	Ret	Ret	16	122
13	Medley Full Time	11	5	14	5	7	21	10	12	Ret	19	28	22	108
13	Medley Full Time	20	25	Ret	10	20	22	11	21	Ret	22	Ret	24	108
14	BMC Racing	17	16	8	13	23	15	12	7	15	10	15	18	105
14	BMC Racing	23	19	Ret	Ret	25	23	13	15	22	20	Ret	26	105
15	Hot Car Competições	21	15	10	9	16	20	Ret	11	14	15	12	19	85
15	Hot Car Competições	22	22	Ret	12	27	Ret	DSQ	Ret	19	18	Ret	Ret	85
16	Bassani Racing	12	17			28	27	18	Ret	26	21	19	9	21
16	Bassani Racing	18	Ret			Ret	Ret	19	Ret	28	Ret	23	Ret	21
Pos	Team	INT1	CUR1	VEL	RBP	LON	RIO	SAL	CAS	TAR	CUR2	BRA	INT2	Pts

Colour	Result
Gold	Winner
Silver	Second place
Bronze	Third place
Green	Points classification
Blue	Non-points classification
Blue	Non-classified finish (NC)
Purple	Retired, not classified (Ret)
Red	Did not qualify (DNQ)
Red	Did not pre-qualify (DNPQ)
Black	Disqualified (DSQ)
White	Did not start (DNS)
White	Withdrew (WD)
White	Race cancelled (C)
Blank	Did not practice (DNP)
Blank	Did not arrive (DNA)
Blank	Excluded (EX)
