= 2010 Stock Car Brasil season =

Car racing competition

Seasons
- ← 2009 2011 →

The 2010 Copa Caixa Stock Car season was the 32nd Stock Car Brasil season. It began on March 28 at Interlagos and ended on December 5 at Curitiba after twelve rounds.

Max Wilson won the Drivers' Championship by thirteen points from Cacá Bueno, Wilson team-mate Ricardo Mauricio and Allam Khodair finished in third.

== Teams and drivers ==
All drivers were Brazilian-registered.

Manufacturer	Team	No.	Driver	Rounds
Peugeot 307	Red Bull Racing	0	Cacá Bueno	All
Peugeot 307	Red Bull Racing	29	Daniel Serra	All
Peugeot 307	JF Racing	2	Alan Hellmeister	All
Peugeot 307	JF Racing	25	Júlio Campos	All
Peugeot 307	Amir Nasr Racing	3	Cláudio Ricci	All
Peugeot 307	Amir Nasr Racing	5	Constantino Júnior	1–5, 7–8
Peugeot 307	Amir Nasr Racing	20	Ricardo Sperafico	9–12
Peugeot 307	Amir Nasr Racing	28	Juliano Moro	6
Peugeot 307	RCM Motorsport	6	Alceu Feldmann	All
Peugeot 307	RCM Motorsport	63	Lico Kaesemodel	All
Peugeot 307	Mico's Racing	7	Thiago Marques	1–5
Peugeot 307	Mico's Racing	9	Giuliano Losacco	All
Peugeot 307	Mico's Racing	19	Rodrigo Sperafico	6–12
Peugeot 307	Itaipava Racing Team	14	Luciano Burti	All
Peugeot 307	Itaipava Racing Team	35	David Muffato	All
Peugeot 307	RC3 Bassani	16	Diego Nunes	All
Peugeot 307	RC3 Bassani	19	Rodrigo Sperafico	1–2
Peugeot 307	RC3 Bassani	31	Willian Starostik	3–12
Peugeot 307	Blau Full Time	18	Allam Khodair	All
Peugeot 307	Blau Full Time	80	Marcos Gomes	All
Chevrolet Vectra	Hot Car Competições	1	Antônio Pizzonia	All
Chevrolet Vectra	Hot Car Competições	20	Ricardo Sperafico	6–7
Chevrolet Vectra	Hot Car Competições	44	Norberto Gresse	1–5, 8–12
Chevrolet Vectra	AMG Motorsport	4	Gustavo Sondermann	1–5
Chevrolet Vectra	AMG Motorsport	7	Thiago Marques	6–12
Chevrolet Vectra	AMG Motorsport	51	Átila Abreu	All
Chevrolet Vectra	Gramacho Competições	4	Gustavo Sondermann	6–7
Chevrolet Vectra	Gramacho Competições	31	Willian Starostik	1
Chevrolet Vectra	Gramacho Competições	55	Christian Fittipaldi	All
Chevrolet Vectra	Gramacho Competições	70	Tarso Marques	2–5
Chevrolet Vectra	Vogel Motorsport	8	Pedro Gomes	All
Chevrolet Vectra	Vogel Motorsport	21	Thiago Camilo	All
Chevrolet Vectra	Cosan Mobil Super Racing	11	Nonô Figueiredo	All
Chevrolet Vectra	Cosan Mobil Super Racing	77	Valdeno Brito	All
Chevrolet Vectra	RZ Motorsport	15	Antonio Jorge Neto	All
Chevrolet Vectra	RZ Motorsport	28	Juliano Moro	10
Chevrolet Vectra	RZ Motorsport	100	Ricardo Zonta	1–9, 11–12
Chevrolet Vectra	Officer ProGP	23	Duda Pamplona	All
Chevrolet Vectra	Officer ProGP	33	Felipe Maluhy	All
Chevrolet Vectra	Eurofarma RC	65	Max Wilson	All
Chevrolet Vectra	Eurofarma RC	90	Ricardo Maurício	All
Chevrolet Vectra	A.Mattheis Motorsport	74	Popó Bueno	All
Chevrolet Vectra	A.Mattheis Motorsport	99	Xandinho Negrão	All

== Race calendar and results ==
All races were held in Brazil.

Round	Circuit	Date	Pole position	Fastest lap	Winning driver	Winning team
1	Interlagos Circuit	March 28	Cacá Bueno	Cacá Bueno	Max Wilson	Eurofarma RC
2	Autódromo Internacional de Curitiba	April 11	Marcos Gomes	Valdeno Brito	Allam Khodair	Blau Full Time
3	Velopark, Nova Santa Rita	May 2	Valdeno Brito	Valdeno Brito	Ricardo Maurício	Eurofarma RC
4	Autódromo Internacional Nelson Piquet, Rio de Janeiro	May 23	Allam Khodair	Ricardo Maurício	Felipe Maluhy	Officer ProGP
5	Ribeirão Preto Street Circuit	June 6	Átila Abreu	Cláudio Ricci	Átila Abreu	AMG Motorsport
6	Circuito Ayrton Senna, Salvador	August 15	Cacá Bueno	Thiago Camilo	Cacá Bueno	Red Bull Racing
7	Interlagos Circuit	September 5	Marcos Gomes	Valdeno Brito	Ricardo Maurício	Eurofarma RC
8	Autódromo Internacional Orlando Moura	September 19	Daniel Serra	Nonô Figueiredo	Nonô Figueiredo	Cosan Mobil Super Racing
Mobil Super Final
9	Autódromo Internacional Ayrton Senna, Londrina	October 10	Duda Pamplona	Max Wilson	Max Wilson	Eurofarma RC
10	Autódromo Internacional de Santa Cruz do Sul	October 24	Max Wilson	Antônio Pizzonia	Allam Khodair	Blau Full Time
11	Autódromo Internacional Nelson Piquet, Brasília	November 21	Ricardo Maurício	Ricardo Maurício	Cacá Bueno	Red Bull Racing
12	Autódromo Internacional de Curitiba	December 5	Thiago Camilo	Max Wilson	Diego Nunes	RC3 Bassani

== Championship standings ==
=== Drivers' championship ===
Pos	Driver	INT1	CUR1	VEL	RIO	RBP	SAL	INT2	CAM	LON	SCS	BRA	CUR2	Drop	Points
Mobil Super Final
1	Max Wilson	1	4	Ret	8	5	5	20	Ret	1	**8**	2	8	8	265
2	Cacá Bueno	**14**	9	6	7	9	**1**	4	DSQ	2	12	1	7	4	264
3	Ricardo Maurício	20	2	1	19	2	10	1	3	6	3	**Ret**	20		251
3	Allam Khodair	23	1	20	**4**	10	24	13	9	10	1	5	Ret		251
5	Átila Abreu	2	7	2	3	**1**	Ret	3	17	Ret	4	Ret	19		234
6	Felipe Maluhy	7	15	9	1	7	11	16	Ret	16	6	14	6		230
7	Nonô Figueiredo	3	3	17	10	12	4	6	1	8	Ret	11	17		229
7	Marcos Gomes	Ret	**6**	18	2	13	7	**2**	2	20	22	15	4		229
9	Daniel Serra	4	12	13	6	4	9	7	**DSQ**	Ret	23	4	13		224
10	Popó Bueno	Ret	16	4	Ret	26	6	11	4	12	10	13	Ret		219
Mobil Super Final cutoff
11	Júlio Campos	8	Ret	3	9	Ret	27	18	Ret	4	16	8	3		69
12	Thiago Camilo	18	8	Ret	Ret	20	2	5	DSQ	Ret	DSQ	3	**DSQ**		56
13	Xandinho Negrão	15	Ret	8	13	14	22	DNS	DSQ	Ret	7	7	2		52
14	Valdeno Brito	Ret	5	**Ret**	Ret	17	8	19	Ret	9	2	17	Ret		47
15	Diego Nunes	12	18	5	21	Ret	Ret	17	Ret	Ret	14	Ret	1		43
15	Lico Kaesemodel	5	10	14	23	DNS	12	12	21	14	Ret	10	9		43
17	Duda Pamplona	Ret	Ret	10	25	22	3	24	19	**3**	13	16	15		42
18	Luciano Burti	Ret	Ret	7	Ret	Ret	21	14	7	7	5	Ret	Ret		41
19	David Muffato	Ret	Ret	Ret	5	25	19	26	6	Ret	11	6	Ret		39
20	Ricardo Zonta	Ret	13	15	Ret	8	Ret	Ret	5	21		Ret	5		36
21	Giuliano Losacco	Ret	11	Ret	21	6	13	Ret	14	5	17	24	Ret		32
21	Alceu Feldmann	9	19	Ret	16	19	26	Ret	10	11	9	9	12	4	32
23	Antônio Pizzonia	16	Ret	Ret	Ret	3	Ret	Ret	8	14	18	12	Ret		31
24	Rodrigo Sperafico	6	Ret				16	8	10	Ret	DSQ	23	EX		24
25	Cláudio Ricci	22	17	11	12	11	20	10	20	Ret	Ret	21	14		22
26	Antonio Jorge Neto	Ret	Ret	Ret	10	Ret	18	15	Ret	19	Ret	19	11		12
26	Pedro Gomes	13	14	Ret	15	23	Ret	Ret	18	DNS	20	Ret	10		12
28	Alan Hellmeister	Ret	22	Ret	14	Ret	14	22	12	17	DSQ	DNS	Ret		8
29	Constantino Júnior	21	20	Ret	Ret	Ret		9	16						7
29	Willian Starostik	Ret		12	Ret	27	25	23	13	Ret	Ret	DNS	Ret		7
31	Gustavo Sondermann	10	Ret	Ret	24	21	Ret	25							6
31	Thiago Marques	11	Ret	Ret	Ret	18	Ret	21	22	18	15	Ret	18		6
33	Norberto Gresse	17	Ret	19	26	15			23	15	21	18	Ret		2
34	Christian Fittipaldi	19	21	17	18	16	23	Ret	15	Ret	Ret	Ret	Ret		1
34	Juliano Moro						15				19				1
36	Ricardo Sperafico						17	Ret		Ret	DSQ	20	16		0
36	Tarso Marques		Ret	Ret	17	24									0
Pos	Driver	INT1	CUR1	VEL	RIO	RBP	SAL	INT2	CAM	LON	SCS	BRA	CUR2	Drop	Points

Colour	Result
Gold	Winner
Silver	Second place
Bronze	Third place
Green	Points classification
Blue	Non-points classification
Blue	Non-classified finish (NC)
Purple	Retired, not classified (Ret)
Red	Did not qualify (DNQ)
Red	Did not pre-qualify (DNPQ)
Black	Disqualified (DSQ)
White	Did not start (DNS)
White	Withdrew (WD)
White	Race cancelled (C)
Blank	Did not practice (DNP)
Blank	Did not arrive (DNA)
Blank	Excluded (EX)

**Bold** – Pole
Italics – Fastest Lap
