= Tuka Rocha =

Brazilian racing driver (1982–2019)

Christiano 'Tuka' Rocha
- Nationality: (Brazil) Brazilian
- Born: Christiano Chiaradia Alcoba Rocha; December 13, 1982 São Paulo, São Paulo State
- Died: November 17, 2019 (aged 36) Salvador, Bahia

Superleague Formula career
- Debut season: 2008
- Current team: Flamengo
- Car number: 7
- Starts: 12
- Wins: 0
- Poles: 0
- Fastest laps: 0
- Best finish: 15th in 2008

Christiano "Tuka" Chiaradia Alcoba Rocha (December 13, 1982 – November 17, 2019) was a Brazilian race car driver. He won numerous karting championships in Brazil from 1996 to 2000. He then moved up to South American Formula 3 Lights. In 2002, he moved to Europe to compete in the World Series by Nissan where he was Ricardo Zonta's teammate. In 2004, he competed in Superfund Euro 3000. In 2005, he was a test driver for A1 Team Brazil in the A1 Grand Prix Series and was named one of the team's race drivers for the 2006-2007 season. In 2008, Rocha was chosen to drive the Flamengo's car in Formula Superleague.

Rocha died on November 17, 2019, three days after being involved in a small airplane crash near Bahia, Brazil. On a private flight from Jundiaí Airport to Maraú-Barra Grande Airport near Maraú, the aircraft crashed on landing. The Cessna Citation II burst into flames, fatally injuring Rocha and two others.

== Racing career ==
=== Superleague Formula record ===
Year	Team	1	2	3	4	5	6	7	8	9	10	11	12	Rank	Pts.
2008	Flamengo; Astromega	DON; 16	DON; 2	NÜR; 16	NÜR; 16	ZOL; 9	ZOL; 14	EST; 11	EST; 10	VAL; 4	VAL; 18	JER; 17	JER; 13	15th	171

=== Complete Stock Car Brasil results ===
Year	Team	Car	1	2	3	4	5	6	7	8	9	10	11	12	13	14	15	16	17	18	19	20	21	22	Pos	Points
2011	Vogel Motorsport	Chevrolet Vectra	CTB; 21	INT; 22	RBP; 23	VEL; 17	CGD; 19	RIO; Ret	INT; Ret	SAL; 5	SCZ; 20	LON; 12	BSB; 9	VEL; 20											19th	23
2012	BMC Racing	Chevrolet Sonic	INT; 23	CTB; 16	VEL; Ret	RBP; Ret	LON; 23	RIO; 23	SAL; 12	CAS; 15	TAR; 22	CTB; 20	BSB; 15	INT; 18											26th	37
2013	RZ Motorsport	Chevrolet Sonic	INT; 23	CUR; 12	TAR; DNS	SAL; 14	BRA; 7	CAS; 16	RBP; 14	CAS; 15	VEL; Ret	CUR; 14	BRA; 19	INT; 28											16th	73
2014	RZ Motorsport	Chevrolet Sonic	INT; 1; 8	SCZ; 1; 13	SCZ; 2; 6	BRA; 1; 22	BRA; 2; 7	GOI; 1 Ret	GOI; 2 DNS	GOI; 1; 19	CAS; 1; 20	CAS; 2; 10	CUR; 1; 25	CUR; 2; 24	VEL; 1 Ret	VEL; 2; 26	SCZ; 1 Ret	SCZ; 2 DNS	TAR; 1 Ret	TAR; 2 Ret	SAL; 1; 15	SAL; 2 Ret	CUR; 1; 10		24th	65
2015	União Química Bassani	Peugeot 408	GOI; 1; 26	RBP; 1; 15	RBP; 2; 1	VEL; 1 Ret	VEL; 2 Ret	CUR; 1; 23	CUR; 2; 9	SCZ; 1; 21	SCZ; 1 Ret	CUR; 2; 18	CUR; 1; 10	GOI; 2; 15	CAS; 1; 30	CAS; 2 DNS	CGD; 1 Ret	CGD; 2 Ret	CUR; 1; 9	CUR; 2; 19	TAR; 1; 20	TAR; 2; 18	INT; 1; 19		23rd	58
2016	TMG Racing	Chevrolet Cruze	CUR; 1 Ret	VEL; 1	VEL; 2	GOI; 1	GOI; 2	SCZ; 1	SCZ; 2	TAR; 1	TAR; 2	CAS; 1	CAS; 2	INT; 1											25th	60
2016	RZ Motorsport	Chevrolet Cruze													LON; 1; 16	LON; 2; 16	CUR; 1; 9	CUR; 2; 16	GOI; 1; 11	GOI; 2; 16	CRI; 1; 18	CRI; 2; 2	INT; 1; 19		25th	60
2017	RCM Motorsport	Chevrolet Cruze	GOI; 1; 10	GOI; 2; 17	VEL; 1; 11	VEL; 2; 11	SCZ; 1; 24	SCZ; 2; 4	CAS; 1 Ret	CAS; 2; 4	CUR; 1 Ret	CRI; 1; 19	CRI; 2; 13	VCA; 1; 13	VCA; 2; 14	LON; 1 Ret	LON; 2; 15	ARG; 1; 16	ARG; 2; 11	TAR; 1; 22	TAR; 2; 6	GOI; 1 Ret	GOI; 2 DNS	INT; 1; 21	20th	90
2018	Vogel Motorsport	Chevrolet Cruze	INT; 1; 19	CUR; 1 Ret	CUR; 2; 11	VEL; 1; 15	VEL; 2 DSQ	LON; 1 Ret	LON; 2; 9	SCZ; 1; 19	SCZ; 2; 18	GOI; 1	MOU; 1	MOU; 2	CAS; 1	CAS; 2	VCA; 1	VCA; 2	TAR; 1	TAR; 2	GOI; 1	GOI; 2	INT; 1		31st	7
