= Ribeirão Preto Street Circuit =

Street circuit

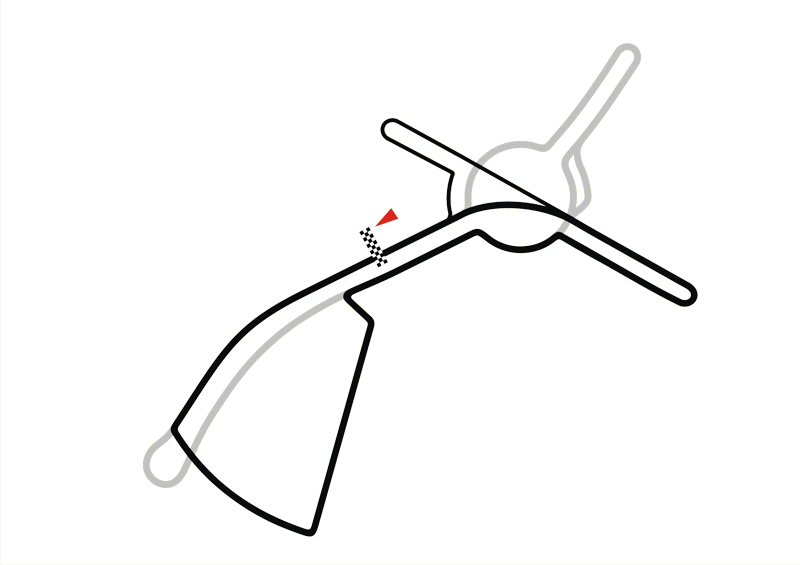
- Street Circuit (2011–2012)

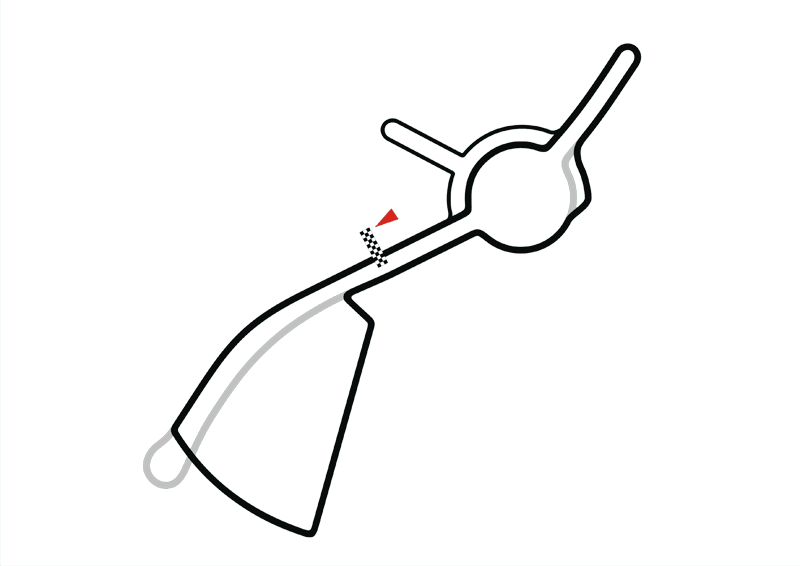
- Street Circuit (2010)
- Location: Ribeirão Preto, São Paulo, Brazil
- Coordinates: 21°05′39.07″S 47°47′53.66″W
- Opened: 6 June 2010; 15 years ago
- Closed: 5 April 2015; 11 years ago
- Major events: Stock Car Brasil (2010–2013, 2015); Mercedes-Benz Challenge (2015); Campeonato Brasileiro de Turismo (2010, 2013)

Street Circuit (2013–2015)
- Length: 2.500 km (1.553 mi)
- Turns: 9
- Race lap record: 1:09.011 ( (Brazil) Átila Abreu, Chevrolet Sonic, 2013, Stock Car Brasil)

Street Circuit (2011–2012)
- Length: 2.395 km (1.488 mi)
- Turns: 12
- Race lap record: 1:08.435 ( (Brazil) Max Wilson, Chevrolet Sonic, 2012, Stock Car Brasil)

Street Circuit (2010)
- Length: 2.221 km (1.380 mi)
- Turns: 15
- Race lap record: 1:10.250 ( (Brazil) Cláudio Ricci, Peugeot 307 Stock Car, 2010, Stock Car Brasil)

The Ribeirão Preto Street Circuit, was a street circuit opened in 2010, located in Ribeirão Preto. The circuit hosted Stock Car Brasil races in 2010–2013, and 2015. The circuit was originally also added into the 2014 season, however the race was canceled in that year.

The circuit layout was changed three times. Átila Abreu was the most successful driver on that circuit, he won 2 times in 2010 and 2011.

== Lap records ==
The fastest official lap records at the Ribeirão Preto Street Circuit are listed as:

Category	Time	Driver	Vehicle	Event
Street Circuit (2013–2015): 2.500 km (1.553 mi)
Stock Car Brasil	1:09.011	Átila Abreu	Chevrolet Sonic	2013 Ribeirão Preto Stock Car Brasil round
Street Circuit (2011–2012): 2.395 km (1.488 mi)
Stock Car Brasil	1:08.435	Max Wilson	Peugeot 408 Stock Car	2012 Ribeirão Preto Stock Car Brasil round
Street Circuit (2010): 2.221 km (1.380 mi)
Stock Car Brasil	1:10.250	Cláudio Ricci	Peugeot 307 Stock Car	2010 Ribeirão Preto Stock Car Brasil round
