= Raphael Matos =

Brazilian open-wheel racing driver

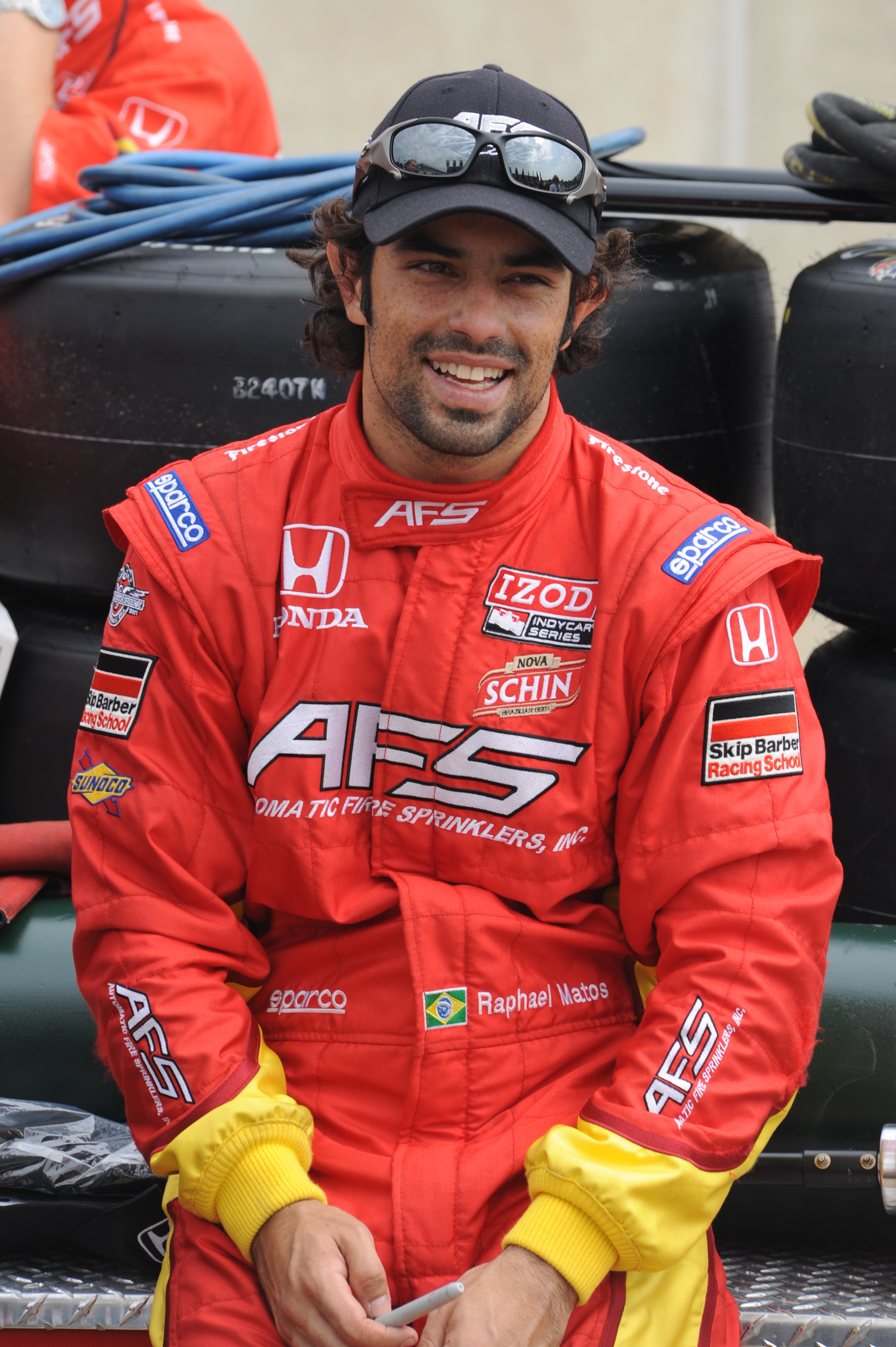
- Matos at the Indianapolis Motor Speedway on the first day of qualifying for the 2011 500
- Nationality: (Brazil) Brazilian
- Born: August 28, 1981 (age 45) Belo Horizonte, Brazil

IndyCar Series career
- Debut season: 2009
- Current team: AFS Racing
- Categorisation: FIA Gold
- Car number: 17
- Former teams: de Ferran Dragon Racing
- Starts: 38
- Wins: 0
- Poles: 0
- Best finish: 13th in 2009

Previous series
- 2008 2006-2007 2004-2005 2002-2003: Firestone Indy Lights; Champ Car Atlantic Series; A1 Grand Prix; Star Mazda Series; Skip Barber Formula Dodge Series

Championship titles
- 2008 2007 2005 2003: Firestone Indy Lights Series; Champ Car Atlantic Series; Star Mazda Series; Skip Barber Formula Dodge

Awards
- 2009: IndyCar Series Rookie of the Year

Raphael "Rafa" Matos (born August 28, 1981) is a Brazilian professional racing driver. He was the 2008 Firestone Indy Lights Series champion and the 2007 Champ Car Atlantic Series champion. In sports car racing, Matos is a three-time champion of the Trans-Am Series, winning the title in the 2018, 2021 and 2024 seasons, all in the TA2 class. He lives in Miami.

== Career highlights ==
=== Early career ===
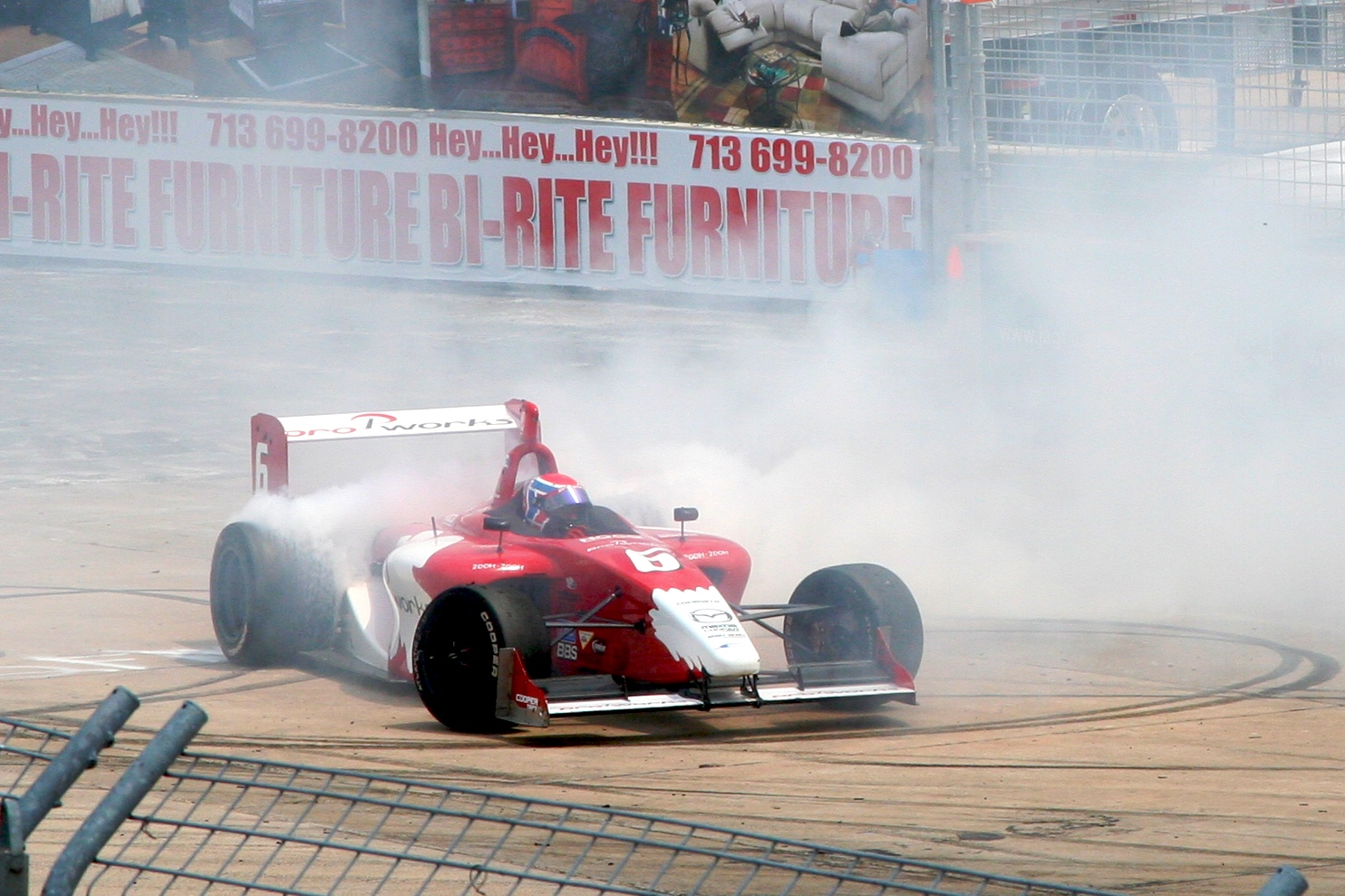
Matos celebrating an Atlantics victory in Houston in 2007

Born in Belo Horizonte, Matos came to the United States in 2002 after karting in Brazil and began competing in Skip Barber Formula Dodge, winning the championship in 2003. In 2004, he moved up to the Star Mazda Series and in 2005 he won the Star Mazda championship. In 2006, he moved up the Champ Car Atlantic Championship Series where he drove for the Sierra Sierra team and captured one victory on his way to fourth place in the points standings.

Matos also competed in four Indy Pro Series races for Guthrie Racing and swept the two races held in March at St. Petersburg, Florida. During the fall he was named a driver for A1 Team Brazil in the A1 Grand Prix series and made his debut at the series' race in Beijing in the 2006–2007 season. He raced a Lola B07/40-Mazda in the 2007 12 Hours of Sebring and the 2007 Petit Le Mans.

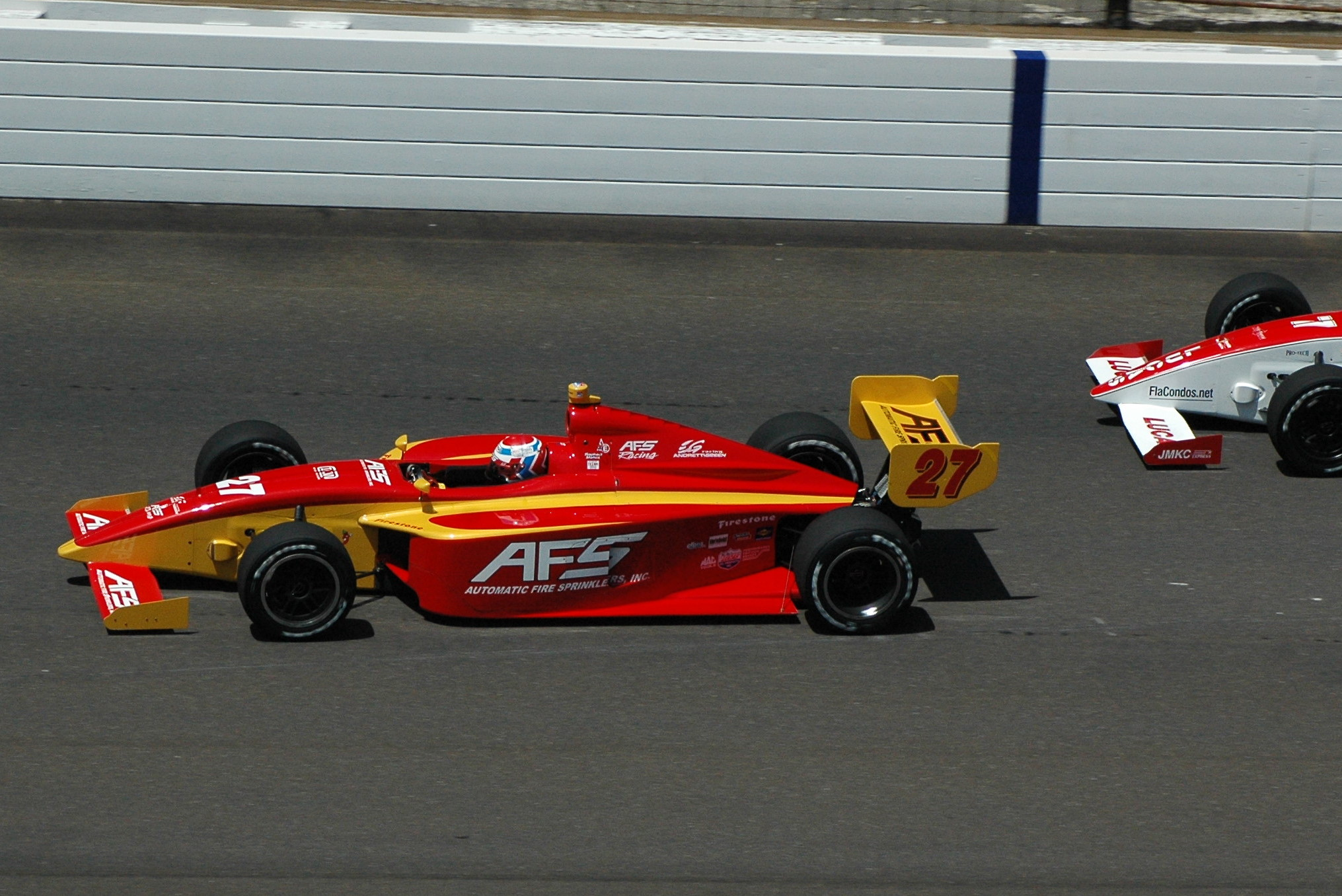
Matos driving in the 2008 Firestone Freedom 100

=== Atlantics championship and Indy Lights ===
Matos continued with the Sierra Sierra team in Atlantics in 2007 and clinched the championship with several races remaining in the season, securing for himself the $2 million "scholarship" for a ride in Champ Car for the 2008 season.

However, Matos decided to pass on the scholarship and sign with Andretti Green Racing to drive in the Indy Racing League's Firestone Indy Lights Series in 2008, where he won the series championship.

Prior to the 2008 Indy Lights season, Matos drove a Mazda RX-8 for the SpeedSource team in the Rolex 24 at Daytona, taking first in the GT class and a ninth place overall finish, sharing the car with Nick Ham, David Haskell and Sylvain Tremblay. After the season, he drove for Michael Shank Racing on the winning team in the DP class (with Ian James and John Pew) at the SunRichGourmet.com 1000 at Miller Motorsports Park.

=== IndyCar Series ===
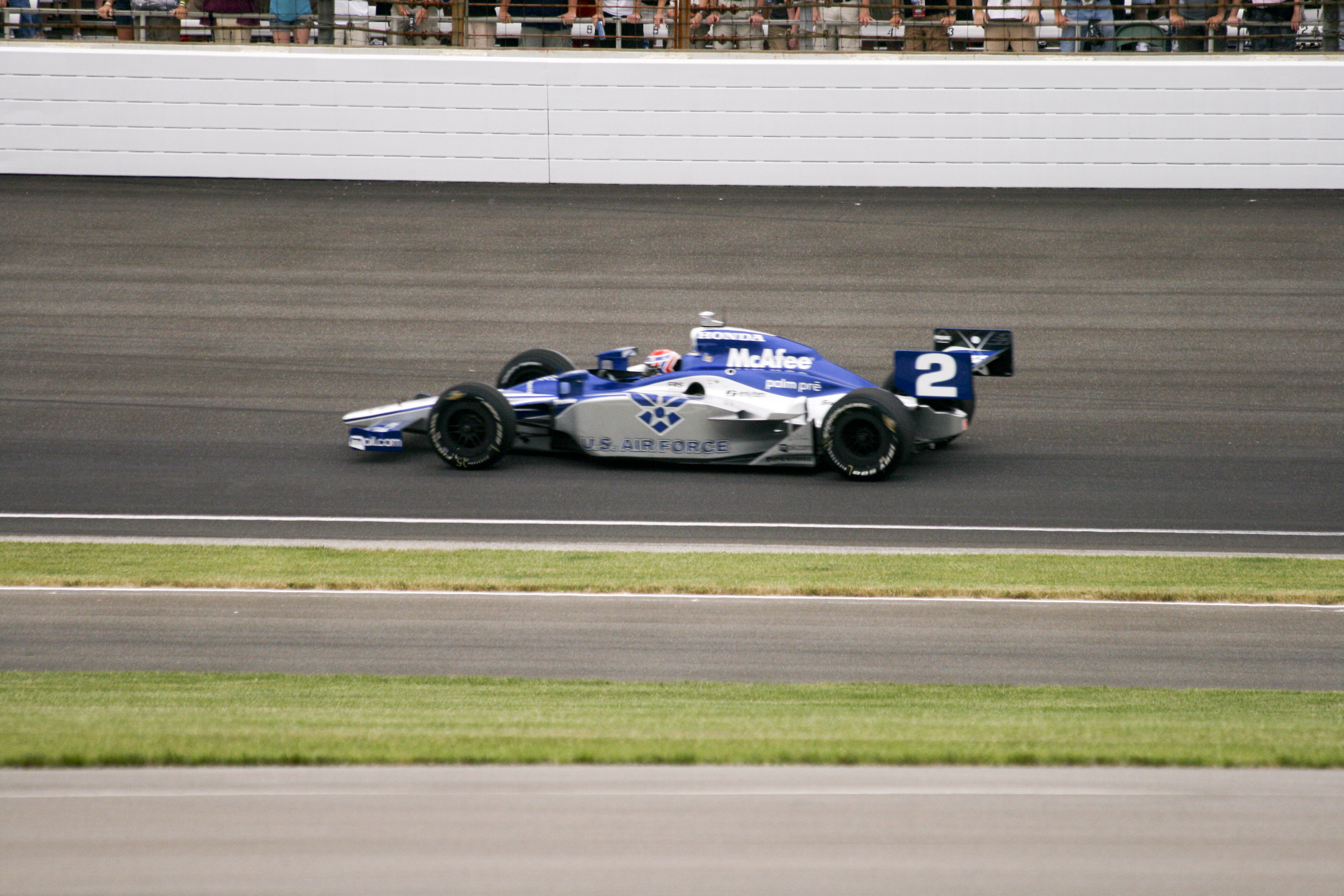
Matos driving in the 2009 Indianapolis 500

Matos competed in the full 2009 IndyCar Series season for Luczo-Dragon Racing. He qualified third in his second race, the Long Beach Grand Prix and finished eight. He was the fastest rookie qualifier in his first Indy 500 and ran in the lead pack, but had a crash with Vítor Meira in which Meira was injured. Matos finished 22nd. Matos captured seasonal Rookie of the Year honors by a wide margin over former F1 driver Robert Doornbos. Matos' best finish was sixth at the Milwaukee Mile. He was running at the finish of each of the last ten races of the season, consistency that led to thirteenth in the championship despite few top ten finishes. Matos qualified twelfth in both the 2009 and 2010 Indy 500 and he also crashed in both races in roughly the same location at the exit of turn 1. He failed to qualify the AFS entry for the 2011 Indianapolis 500. He was also the fastest Rookie during the 2009 Indy 500 qualifying.

=== After IndyCar ===
Matos raced full-time in Stock Car Brasil between 2013 and 2015, claiming a race win in 2014, and a best of thirteenth overall in 2015. At the end of 2015, he failed a drug test, and was suspended for two years. Matos claimed that he used the undisclosed substance in question in order to treat several tumors he had since he was eighteen.

In 2018, Matos started racing in the Trans-Am Series, and won the TA2 class championship at his first attempt. He won the class championship again in 2021, after finishing in first place in six out of twelve races. He won the TA2 championship again in 2024.

On August 30, 2024, it was announced that Matos would attempt to make his NASCAR Xfinity Series debut at Watkins Glen International, driving the No. 87 Chevrolet for Jordan Anderson Racing in collaboration with Peterson Racing Group, but several days later, it was revealed that Matos would not make his debut due to being unable to come to a mutual agreement with the team. He would be replaced by Mike Skeen.

== Motorsports career results ==
=== American open–wheel racing ===
(key) (Races in bold indicate pole position) (Races in italics indicate fastest lap)

==== Atlantic Championship ====
Year	Team	1	2	3	4	5	6	7	8	9	10	11	12	Rank	Points
2006	Sierra Sierra Enterprises	LBH; 2	**HOU**; 11	MTY; 23	POR; 6	CLE1; 5	CLE2; Ret	TOR; 9	**EDM**; Ret	**SJO**; 1	DEN; 2	MTL; 7	**ROA**; 2	**4th**	**205**
2007	Sierra Sierra Enterprises	LVG; 1	**LBH**; 1	**HOU**; 1	POR1; 4	POR2; 6	**CLE**; 1	MTT; 2	**TOR**; 3	EDM1; 1	**EDM2**; 1	SJO; 4	ROA; 2	**1st**	**341**

==== Indy Lights ====
Year	Team	1	2	3	4	5	6	7	8	9	10	11	12	13	14	15	16	Rank	Points	Ref
2006	Guthrie Racing	HMS	**STP1**; 1	STP2; 1	INDY	WGL; 13	IMS; 4	NSH	MIL	KTY	SNM1	SNM2	CHI					**10th**	**154**	
2008	AGR-AFS Racing	**HMS**; 8	**STP1**; 1	STP2; 12	KAN; 19	INDY; 10	MIL; 3	IOW; 7	WGL1; 1	WGL2; 2	NSH; 5	**MOH1**; 1	MOH2; 18	**KTY**; 6	SNM1; 2	SNM2; 6	**CHI**; 3	**1st**	**510**	

==== IndyCar Series ====
IndyCar Series results
Year	Team	No.	Chassis	Engine	1	2	3	4	5	6	7	8	9	10	11	12	13	14	15	16	17	18	Rank	Points	Ref
2009	Luczo Dragon Racing	2	Dallara IR-05	Honda HI7R V8	STP; 20	LBH; 8	KAN; 20	INDY; 22	MIL; 6	TXS; 12	IOW; 16	RIR; 8	WGL; 12	TOR; 10	EDM; 18	KTY; 16	MOH; 9	SNM; 9	CHI; 9	MOT; 9	HMS; 14		13th	312	
2010	de Ferran Dragon Racing	2	Dallara IR-05	Honda HI7R V8	SAO; 4	STP; 8	ALA; 14	LBH; 20	KAN; 16	INDY; 29	TXS; 16	IOW; 14	WGL; 4	TOR; 21	EDM; 13	MOH; 7	SNM; 21	CHI; 29	KTY; 16	MOT; 18	HMS; 17		14th	290	
2011	AFS Racing	17	Dallara IR-05	Honda HI7R V8	STP; 7	ALA; 20	LBH; 11	SAO; 25	INDY; DNQ	TXS1	TXS2	MIL	IOW	TOR	EDM	MOH	NHM	SNM	BAL	MOT	KTY	LSV	30th	67	

Years	Teams	Races	Poles	Wins	Podiums (Non-win)	Top 10s (Non-podium)	Indianapolis 500 Wins	Championships
3	2	38	0	0	0	13	0	0

==== Indianapolis 500 ====
Year	Chassis	Engine	Start	Finish	Team
2009	Dallara	Honda	12	22	Luczo Dragon Racing
2010	Dallara	Honda	12	29	de Ferran Dragon Racing
2011	Dallara	Honda	DNQ		AFS Racing

=== American Le Mans Series ===
American Le Mans Series results
Year	Entrant	Class	Chassis	Engine	Tyres	1	2	3	4	5	6	7	8	9	10	11	12	Rank	Points	Ref
2006	B-K Motorsports	LMP2	Courage C65	Mazda R20B 2.0L 3-rotor	G	SEB ovr:Ret cls:Ret	TEX	MID	LIM	UTA	POR	AME	MOS	PET	MON			23rd	14	
2007	B-K Motorsports Mazdaspeed	LMP2	Lola B07/46	Mazda MZR-R 2.0L Turbo I4	K	SEB ovr:NC cls:NC	STP	LNB	TEX	UTA	LIM	MID	AME	MOS	DET	PET ovr:Ret cls:Ret	MON	28th	10	
2008	B-K Motorsports	LMP2	Lola B07/46	Mazda MZR-R 2.0 L Turbo I4 (E85 ethanol)	Y	SEB ovr:DNS cls:DNS	STP	LNB	UTA	LIM								33rd	10	
2008	B-K Motorsports	LMP2	Lola B08/86	Mazda MZR-R 2.0 L Turbo I4 (E85 ethanol)	D											MON ovr:30 cls:10		33rd	10	
2008	Andretti Green Racing	LMP2	Acura ARX-01b	Acura 3.4L V8	M						MID ovr:14 cls:7	AME	MOS	DET	PET			33rd	10	
2011	Risi Competizione	GT	Ferrari 458 Italia GTC	Ferrari 4.5 L V8	M	SEB	LNB	LIM	MOS	MID	AME	BAL	MON	PET ovr:DNS cls:DNS				NC	-	
2012	Performance Tech Motorsports	PC	Oreca FLM09	Chevrolet LS3 6.2 L V8	M	SEB ovr:49 cls:6	LNB	MON	LIM	MOS	MID	AME	BAL ovr:Ret cls:Ret	VIR	PET			28th	10	

=== A1 Grand Prix ===
(key) (Races in bold indicate pole position) (Races in italics indicate fastest lap)

A1 Grand Prix results
Year	Entrant	1	2	3	4	5	6	7	8	9	10	11	12	13	14	15	16	17	18	19	20	21	22	DC	Points	Ref
2006–07	Brazil	NED; SPR	NED; FEA	CZE; SPR	CZE; FEA	BEI; SPR; 6	BEI; FEA; 7	MYS; SPR; 19	MYS; FEA; 18	IDN; SPR	IDN; FEA	NZL; SPR; 16	NZL; FEA; 14	AUS; SPR	AUS; FEA	RSA; SPR	RSA; FEA	MEX; SPR	MEX; FEA	SHA; SPR	SHA; FEA	GBR; SPR	GBR; SPR	18th	9	

=== Stock Car Brasil ===
Stock Car Brasil results
Year	Team	Car	1	2	3	4	5	6	7	8	9	10	11	12	13	14	15	16	17	18	19	20	21	Rank	Points
2012	RC3 Bassani	Peugeot 408	INT	CTB	VEL	RBP	LON	RIO	SAL	CAS	TAR	CTB	BSB; 23	INT; 9										NC†	0†
2013	Bardahl Hot Car	Chevrolet Sonic	INT; 10	CUR; 26	TAR; 16	SAL; 26	BRA; 10	CAS; 19	RBP; 6	CAS; 8	VEL; 16	CUR; 18	BRA; 10	INT; 18										13th	84
2014	Bardahl Hot Car	Chevrolet Sonic	INT; 1; 17	SCZ; 1; 7	SCZ; 2; 23	BRA; 1; 2	BRA; 2; 26	GOI; 1; 17	GOI; 2 Ret	GOI; 1 DSQ	CAS; 1 Ret	CAS; 2; 27	CUR; 1; 22	CUR; 2; 12	VEL; 1 Ret	VEL; 2 Ret	SCZ; 1; 10	**SCZ**; **2**; 1	TAR; 1; 15	TAR; 2; 8	SAL; 1; 10	**SAL**; **2**; 2	BRA; 1 Ret	16th	104

† Ineligible for championship points.

- Season still in progress

Sporting positions
Preceded by Alex Lloyd	Firestone Indy Lights Champion; 2008	Succeeded by J. R. Hildebrand
Preceded by Simon Pagenaud	Champ Car Atlantic Champion; 2007	Succeeded by Markus Niemelä
Preceded by Michael McDowell	Star Mazda Championship Champion; 2005	Succeeded by Adrian Carrio
Achievements
Preceded by Hideki Mutoh	IndyCar Series Rookie of the Year; 2009	Succeeded by Alex Lloyd
