= Max Wilson (racing driver) =

Brazilian racing driver (born 1972)

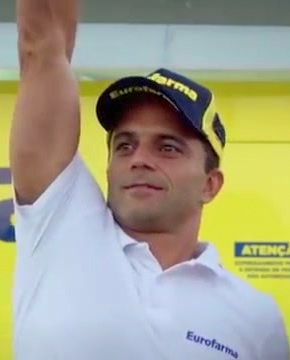
- Wilson in 2018
- Nationality: Brazilian
- Born: Max Wilson Ferreira de Lima; 22 August 1972 (age 54) Hamburg, West Germany

Stock Car Brasil
- Teams: Eufarma RC
- Starts: 100
- Championships: 1 (2010)
- Wins: 9
- Poles: 6
- Fastest laps: 5

Previous series
- 1994 1995 1995–96 1996 1997–99 2001 2002–08 2009-current: Formula Chevrolet; Formula Three Sudamericana; German Formula 3 DTM; International Formula 3000; Champ Car; V8 Supercar; Stock Car Brasil

Max Wilson Ferreira de Lima (born 22 August 1972 in Hamburg, West Germany) is a racing driver of Brazilian parentage. He won the Stock Car Brasil title in 2010, claimed seven podiums at the International Formula 3000 Championship, and also competed in CART and V8 Supercars.

Wilson has been a color analyst on Formula One and Stock Car Brasil broadcasts at Band Sports. Previously he worked at Sportv from 2014 to 2018.

== Racing career ==
=== Junior formulae ===
Wilson started his motor racing career in 1985 in go-karts. He moved into single-seaters in 1993, when he was offered a ride in the Brazilian Formula Ford Championship. In 1994, he moved to the Brazilian Formula Chevrolet Championship and finished second overall, behind Felipe Giaffone.

=== Formula 3 ===
Again, Wilson graduated up a level into Formula Three Sudamericana for the 1995 season. Again he finished 2nd in the championship, this time behind Ricardo Zonta. After testing for the WTS-F3-Team, owned by Michael Schumacher's personal manager Willi Weber, Wilson was signed by the BSR squad to compete at Magny-Cours for the penultimate round of the German Formula Three Championship that year. He finished 5th and 6th in the double-header event.

Wilson moved to Munich at the beginning of 1996 to race in the German Formula Three Championship. Willi Weber had sold his WTS-F3-Team to aspiring team owner Georgis Tokmakidis, and Wilson was signed to race with Dutchman Tom Coronel as a team-mate. But the team struggled with personnel problems; Coronel ended up never racing for the team and a variety of drivers walked in and out. After winning a pre-season non-championship, the team's subsequent results were disappointing and led to Wilson, one of the championship favorites, leaving the team after two races. He then decided to join the Italian Prema Power F3 Team as a team mate to André Couto from mid-season on, and managed to win one championship round in wet conditions at Diepholz, despite the car having an underpowered Fiat engine. In those days almost every car on the grid was powered by the superior Opel Spiess engine. Wilson finished 10th in the championship.

=== Sportscars ===
Wilson was offered a drive with Porsche to contest the 1997 FIA GT1 championship and the Le Mans 24 Hours but turned down the offer to prioritise Formula 3000 and, ultimately, Formula 1.

=== Formula 3000, Formula 1 and Indycars ===
In 1997, Edenbridge Racing chose Wilson to drive one of their Formula 3000 cars, alongside Werner Lupberger. He finished fifth in the championship, 19 points behind champion Ricardo Zonta after ten rounds. He stayed on at Edenbridge for the 1998 season, and also became a test driver for the Williams F1 team. At the end of 1999, Wilson was offered a drive with the ailing Minardi team for the 2000 season but a lack of financial backing saw him lose the ride at the last minute to Gastón Mazzacane, a less experienced but more financially solvent driver. He spent 2000 as an F1 test driver for Michelin as the tyre manufacturer prepared to re-enter Formula One competition in 2001. Unable to secure a full-time Formula One ride for the 2001 season, Wilson returned to the United States and joined the Arciero-Blair Racing team to contest the CART FedEx Championship Series. The lone bright spots were a fourth place finish in Portland and leading laps in Cleveland.

=== Touring cars ===
At the end of 1996, Wilson drove one race in the International Touring Car Championship at Interlagos for Alfa Romeo, as all manufacturers had one local driver to improve interest among local spectators. He led the second race for a while, eventually finishing in 2nd. Failing to raise a full Champ Car budget for 2002, Wilson moved to Australia where he joined the Ford V8 Supercars team Briggs Motor Sport. In his second outing in a V8 Supercar, Wilson qualified fifth at the Clipsal 500 in Adelaide. Racing for Dick Johnson Racing in 2003, he took his first podium finish in the championship at the final round of the year.

2004 saw Wilson fail to finish five of the rounds, driving for Triple Eight Race Engineering. In 2005, a last-minute arrangement saw Wilson compete in the championship with Team Dynamik after his former Briggs Motor Sport team mate Tony Longhurst became the entrant for one of the team's Holden Commodore VZs. His 2005 campaign included a fifth place in the final race in China and a top ten finish at the Oran Park round.

For 2006, Wilson moved to the WPS Racing team, but immediately prior to the 2008 season the team folded, leaving Wilson without a drive. He returned to his native Brazil but did drive the Australian enduro season with Brad Jones Racing, finishing fifth with Brad Jones at the Bathurst 1000 having led the race in parts. In 2009, he returned to racing in Brazil competing in the Stock Car Brasil, winning the title in 2010.

== Racing record ==
=== Career summary ===
Season	Series	Position	Car	Team
1995	Formula Three Sudamericana	**2nd**	Dallara 394 Mugen Honda; Dallara 394 Opel	Amir Nasr Racing; Prop Car
1995	German Formula Three Championship	19th	Dallara 395 Opel	Opel Team BSR
1996	German Formula Three Championship	10th	Dallara 395 Fiat	Tokmakidis Motorsport; Prema Powerteam
1996	International Touring Car Championship	19th	Alfa Romeo 155 V6 TI	JAS Engineering
1997	International Formula 3000 Championship	5th	Lola T96/50 - Zytek	Edenbridge Racing
1998	International Formula 3000 Championship	9th	Lola T96/50 - Zytek	Edenbridge Racing
1999	International Formula 3000 Championship	8th	Lola B99/50 - Zytek	Super Nova Racing
2001	CART Championship Series	25th	Lola B2K/00 - Ford Cosworth	Arciero-Blair Racing
2002	V8 Supercar Championship Series	32nd	Ford AU Falcon	Briggs Motor Sport
2003	V8 Supercar Championship Series	17th	Ford BA Falcon	Dick Johnson Racing
2004	V8 Supercar Championship Series	28th	Ford BA Falcon	Triple Eight Race Engineering
2005	V8 Supercar Championship Series	24th	Holden VZ Commodore	Team Dynamik
2006	V8 Supercar Championship Series	15th	Ford BA Falcon	WPS Racing
2007	V8 Supercar Championship Series	17th	Ford BF Falcon	WPS Racing
2008	V8 Supercar Championship Series	33rd	Holden VE Commodore	Brad Jones Racing
2009	Stock Car Brasil	9th	Chevrolet Vectra	Eurofarma RC
2010	Stock Car Brasil	**1st**	Chevrolet Vectra	Eurofarma RC
2011	Stock Car Brasil	4th	Chevrolet Vectra	Eurofarma RC
2012	Stock Car Brasil	6th	Chevrolet Sonic	Eurofarma RC
2013	Stock Car Brasil	5th	Chevrolet Sonic	Eurofarma RC
2014	Stock Car Brasil	10th	Chevrolet Sonic	Eurofarma RC
2015	Stock Car Brasil	8th	Chevrolet Sonic	Eurofarma RC
2016	Stock Car Brasil	12th	Chevrolet Sonic; Chevrolet Cruze	Eurofarma RC

=== Complete International Formula 3000 results ===
(key) (Races in bold indicate pole position; races in italics indicate fastest lap.)

Year	Entrant	Chassis	Engine	1	2	3	4	5	6	7	8	9	10	11	12	Pos.	Pts
1997	Edenbridge Racing	Lola T96/50	Zytek-Judd	SIL; Ret	PAU; 7	HEL; Ret	NÜR; 5	PER; 3	HOC; 2	A1R; 8	SPA; 2	MUG; 4	JER; 10†			5th	21
1998	Edenbridge Racing	Lola T96/50	Zytek-Judd	OSC; 17†	IMO; Ret	CAT; 6	SIL; 5	MON; DNPQ	PAU; 2	A1R; Ret	HOC; Ret	HUN; Ret	SPA; 13	PER; Ret	NÜR; 23†	9th	9
1999	Petrobras Junior Team	Lola T99/50	Zytek	**IMO**; Ret	MON; 3	CAT; DSQ	MAG; Ret	SIL; Ret	A1R; Ret	**HOC**; 2	HUN; Ret	SPA	NÜR; 3			8th	14

=== American open wheel racing results ===
==== FedEx Championship Series ====
(key) (Races in bold indicate pole position)

Year	Team	No.	Chassis	Engine	1	2	3	4	5	6	7	8	9	10	11	12	13	14	15	16	17	18	19	20	Pos.	Pts	Ref
2001	Arciero-Brooke Racing	25	Lola B2K/00	Phoenix IC108F	MTY; 28	LBH; 21	NAZ; 17	MOT																	**25th**	**12**	
2001	Arciero-Blair Racing	25	Lola B2K/00	Ford XD					MIL; 23	DET; 23	POR; 4	CLE; 19	TOR; 25	MCH	CHI	MDO; 15	ROA; 25	VAN; 25	LAU; 18	ROC; 21	HOU; 16	LAG; 24	SRF	FON	**25th**	**12**	

=== V8 Supercar Championship results ===
(key) (Races in bold indicate pole position) (Races in italics indicate fastest lap)

Year	Team	Car	1	2	3	4	5	6	7	8	9	10	11	12	13	14	15	16	17	18	19	20	21	22	23	24	25	26	27	28	29	30	31	32	33	34	35	36	37	38	Pos.	Pts
2002	Briggs Motor Sport	Ford AU Falcon	ADE; R1; Ret	ADE; R2; Ret	PHI; R3; 18	PHI; R4; Ret	EAS; R5; 21	EAS; R6; 27	EAS; R7; 19	HDV; R8; 18	HDV; R9; 22	HDV; R10; 14	CAN; R11; Ret	CAN; R12; 17	CAN; R13; Ret	BAR; R14; 12	BAR; R15; 15	BAR; R16; 19	ORA; R17; 24	ORA; R18; Ret	WIN; R19; 18	WIN; R20; 29	QLD; R21; Ret	BAT; R22; Ret	SUR; R23; 8	SUR; R24; Ret	PUK; R25; 11	PUK; R26; 16	PUK; R27; 9	SAN; R28; 14	SAN; R29; 23										32nd	319
2003	Dick Johnson Racing	Ford BA Falcon	ADE; R1; 26	ADE; R1; Ret	PHI; R3; 16	EAS; R4; 16	WIN; R5; 9	BAR; R6; 24	BAR; R7; 17	BAR; R8; 13	HDV; R9; Ret	HDV; R10; 20	HDV; R11; 16	QLD; R12; 24	ORA; R13; Ret	SAN; R14; 19	BAT; R15; 12	SUR; R16; 9	SUR; R17; 23	PUK; R18; 18	PUK; R19; 24	PUK; R20; 19	EAS; R21; 5	EAS; R22; 3																	17th	1214
2004	Triple Eight Race Engineering	Ford BA Falcon	ADE; R1; Ret	ADE; R2; Ret	EAS; R3; 10	PUK; R4; 5	PUK; R5; 28	PUK; R6; 17	HDV; R7; 10	HDV; R8; Ret	HDV; R9; 22	BAR; R10; 16	BAR; R11; 23	BAR; R12; 17	QLD; R13; 14	WIN; R14; Ret	ORA; R15; Ret	ORA; R16; Ret	SAN; R17; Ret	BAT; R18; Ret	SUR; R19; 8	SUR; R20; 5	SYM; R21; 26	SYM; R22; 15	SYM; R23; 15	EAS; R24; 22	EAS; R25; 8	EAS; R26; 11													28th	865
2005	Team Dynamik	Holden VZ Commodore	ADE; R1; Ret	ADE; R2; 7	PUK; R3; 15	PUK; R4; 15	PUK; R5; Ret	BAR; R6; 31	BAR; R7; 18	BAR; R8; Ret	EAS; R9; 26	EAS; R10; 16	SHA; R11; Ret	SHA; R12; 14	SHA; R13; 5	HDV; R14; 16	HDV; R15; 33	HDV; R16; 13	QLD; R17; 14	ORA; R18; 13	ORA; R19; 10	SAN; R20; DNS	BAT; R21; Ret	SUR; R22; 26	SUR; R23; 25	SUR; R24; 14	SYM; R25; 16	SYM; R26; 14	SYM; R27; 15	PHI; R28; 20	PHI; R29; 21	PHI; R30; 12									24th	931
2006	WPS Racing	Ford BA Falcon	ADE; R1; 16	ADE; R2; 8	PUK; R3; 6	PUK; R4; Ret	PUK; R5; Ret	BAR; R6; 8	BAR; R7; 19	BAR; R8; Ret	WIN; R9; 17	WIN; R10; 6	WIN; R11; 13	HDV; R12; 11	HDV; R13; Ret	HDV; R14; 16	QLD; R15; 10	QLD; R16; Ret	QLD; R17; 11	ORA; R18; 11	ORA; R19; 25	ORA; R20; Ret	SAN; R21; 11	BAT; R22; 14	SUR; R23; 28	SUR; R24; 13	SUR; R25; 13	SYM; R26; 15	SYM; R27; 15	SYM; R28; 14	BHR; R29; 16	BHR; R30; 12	BHR; R31; 24	PHI; R32; 20	PHI; R33; 16	PHI; R34; 16					15th	2038
2007	WPS Racing	Ford BF Falcon	ADE; R1; 17	ADE; R2; Ret	BAR; R3; 23	BAR; R4; 18	BAR; R5; 13	PUK; R6; 16	PUK; R7; 12	PUK; R8; 14	WIN; R9; 9	WIN; R10; Ret	WIN; R11; Ret	EAS; R12; 19	EAS; R13; 23	EAS; R14; 21	HDV; R15; 8	HDV; R16; 14	HDV; R17; 16	QLD; R18; 15	QLD; R19; 14	QLD; R20; Ret	ORA; R21; 16	ORA; R22; 11	ORA; R23; 9	SAN; R24; Ret	BAT; R25; 7	SUR; R26; 13	SUR; R27; 9	SUR; R28; 10	BHR; R29; 23	BHR; R30; 26	BHR; R31; 20	SYM; R32; 26	SYM; R33; 17	SYM; R34; 19	PHI; R35; 19	PHI; R36; 24	PHI; R37; 15		17th	110
2008	Brad Jones Racing	Holden VE Commodore	ADE; R1	ADE; R2	EAS; R3	EAS; R4	EAS; R5	HAM; R6	HAM; R7	HAM; R8	BAR; R29	BAR; R10	BAR; R11	SAN; R12	SAN; R13	SAN; R14	HDV; R15	HDV; R16	HDV; R17	QLD; R18	QLD; R19	QLD; R20	WIN; R21	WIN; R22	WIN; R23	PHI; Q 7	PHI; R24; 15	BAT; R25; 5	SUR; R26	SUR; R27	SUR; R28	BHR; R29	BHR; R30	BHR; R31	SYM; R32	SYM; R33	SYM; R34	ORA; R35	ORA; R36	ORA; R37	33rd	343

=== Complete Stock Car Brasil results ===
Year	Team	Car	1	2	3	4	5	6	7	8	9	10	11	12	13	14	15	16	17	18	19	20	21	Pos.	Pts
2009	Eurofarma RC	Chevrolet Vectra	INT; Ret	CTB; 5	BSB; 4	SCZ; 1	SAO; 16	SAL; 14	RIO; 9	CGD; 25	CTB; 13	BSB; 18	TAR; 10	INT; 3										9th	234
2010	Eurofarma RC	Chevrolet Vectra	INT; 1	CTB; 4	VEL; Ret	RIO; 8	RBP; 5	SAL; 5	INT; 20	CGD; Ret	LON; 1	**SCS**; 8	BSB; 2	CTB; 8										**1st**	**265**
2011	Eurofarma RC	Chevrolet Vectra	CTB; 2	INT; 5	RBP; 2	VEL; Ret	CGD; 9	RIO; 5	INT; 3	SAL; 2	SCZ; 5	LON; 3	BSB; 16	VEL; 17										4th	248
2012	Eurofarma RC	Chevrolet Sonic	INT; 24	CTB; 2	VEL; 3	RBP; 20	LON; 9	RIO; 5	SAL; 9	CGD; 6	TAR; 7	CTB; 13	BSB; 1	INT; 29										6th	138
2013	Eurofarma RC	Chevrolet Sonic	INT; 6	CUR; 7	TAR; 13	SAL; 5	BRA; 13	CAS; 18	RBP; 2	CAS; 3	VEL; 6	CUR; 23	BRA; 7	INT; 5										5th	163
2014	Eurofarma RC	Chevrolet Sonic	INT; 1 Ret	SCZ; 1 Ret	SCZ; 2; 11	BRA; 1; 4	BRA; 2; 22	GOI; 1 Ret	GOI; 2; 10	GOI; 1; 12	CAS; 1; 10	CAS; 2; 3	CUR; 1; 11	CUR; 2; 9	VEL; 1; 6	VEL; 2; 4	SAL; 1; 9	SAL; 2; 3	TAR; 1; 7	TAR; 2; 11	RBP; 1; 18	RBP; 2; 11	CUR; 1; 20	10th	146
2015	Eurofarma RC	Chevrolet Sonic	GOI; 1; 6	**RBP**; **1**; 6	RBP; 2 Ret	VEL; 1; 10	**VEL**; **2**; 1	CUR; 1 Ret	CUR; 2 DNS	SCZ; 1; 5	SCZ; 2; 4	CUR; 1; 11	**CUR**; **2**; 6	GOI; 1; 6	CAS; 1; 27	CAS; 2; 12	MOU; 1; 8	MOU; 2; 5	CUR; 1; 11	CUR; 2; 1	TAR; 1 Ret	TAR; 2; 14	INT; 1 Ret	8th	162
2016	Eurofarma RC	Chevrolet Cruze	CUR; 1; 18	VEL; 1; 5	VEL; 2 Ret	GOI; 1; 4	GOI; 2; 19	SCZ; 1; 22	SCZ; 2; 1	TAR; 1; 1	TAR; 2; 16	CAS; 1; 5	CAS; 2; 8	INT; 1; 4	**LON**; **1**; 22†	LON; 2; 9	CUR; 1 Ret	CUR; 2; 3	GOI; 1; 21†	GOI; 2; 4	CRI; 1 Ret	CRI; 2; 7	INT; 1 Ret	12th	267

=== Complete Bathurst 1000 results ===
Year	Team	Car	Co-driver	Position	Laps
2002	Briggs Motor Sport	Ford AU Falcon	(Australia) Dean Canto	DNF	108
2003	Dick Johnson Racing	Ford BA Falcon	(Australia) David Brabham	12th	158
2004	Triple Eight Race Engineering	Ford BA Falcon	(New Zealand) Paul Radisich	DNF	116
2005	Team Dynamik	Holden VZ Commodore	(Australia) Tony Longhurst	DNF	32
2006	WPS Racing	Ford BA Falcon	(Australia) David Besnard	14th	160
2007	WPS Racing	Ford BF Falcon	(Australia) Jason Bargwanna	7th	161
2008	Brad Jones Racing	Holden VE Commodore	(Australia) Brad Jones	5th	161

Sporting positions
Preceded by Cacá Bueno	Stock Car Brasil; Champion; 2010	Succeeded by Cacá Bueno
