= Nonô Figueiredo =

Brazilian racing driver (born 1971)

Flávio Pagano "Nonô" Figueiredo is a Brazilian auto racing driver. He is better known as "Nonô" Figueiredo and drives in the Brazilian V8 Stock Car Series. He started racing in Karting in 1984, winning several championship titles.In 1989 and 1990, he raced in some North American Formula Ford races. In 1993, he drove in the Italian formula 3 Championship, followed by Formula Fiat drives back in Brazil in 1995 and 1996, with six race wins in two years.

Figueiredo raced in Great Britain in 1997, driving for TJ Motorsport in the Vauxhall Vectra Challenge with four race wins. In 1998, he achieved more success, with another four wins that year. This earned him a drive for two races in the British Touring Car Championship for the works Vauxhall team, replacing the injured John Cleland for the rounds at Thruxton. Since 2000, he has raced back in Brazil, in the V8 Stock cars (until 2014) and Brasileiro de Marcas (2015).

== Racing record ==
=== Complete British Touring Car Championship results ===
(key) (Races in bold indicate pole position - 1 point awarded all races) (Races in italics indicate fastest lap) (* signifies that driver lead feature race for at least one lap - 1 point awarded)

Year	Team	Car	1	2	3	4	5	6	7	8	9	10	11	12	13	14	15	16	17	18	19	20	21	22	23	24	25	26	Pos	Pts
1998	Vauxhall Sport	Vauxhall Vectra	THR; 1	THR; 2	SIL; 1	SIL; 2	DON; 1	DON; 2	BRH; 1	BRH; 2	OUL; 1	OUL; 2	DON; 1	DON; 2	CRO; 1	CRO; 2	SNE; 1	SNE; 2	THR; 1; 17	THR; 2; 11	KNO; 1	KNO; 2	BRH; 1	BRH; 2	OUL; 1	OUL; 2	SIL; 1	SIL; 2	**22nd**	**0**

=== Partial Stock Car Brasil results ===
(key) (Races in bold indicate pole position) (Races in italics indicate fastest lap)

Year	Team	Car	1	2	3	4	5	6	7	8	9	10	11	12	Pos	Points
2001	Scuderia 111	Chevrolet Vectra	CTB; 6	TAR; 14	INT; 1	CTB; 7	BSB; Ret	INT; 6	RIO; 12	GOI; 10	RIO; 6	CTB; 9	LON; 5	INT; 10	9th	46
2002	Scuderia 111	Chevrolet Vectra	RIO; 7	CTB; 3	INT; 3	LON; 4	CGD; 14	INT; Ret	RIO; 4	GUA; 3	BSB; 4	CTB; 6	LON; 5	INT; 3	5th	137
2003	Scuderia 111	Chevrolet Vectra	CTB; Ret	CGD; 20	INT; 18	RIO; 16	LON; 1	INT; 3	CTB; 5	CGD; 10	RIO; 11	BSB; Ret	CTB; Ret	INT; Ret	11th	64
2004	Avallone Motorsport	Chevrolet Astra	CTB; Ret	INT; 5	TAR; 21	LON; Ret	RIO; Ret	INT; 18	CTB; 18	LON; DSQ	RIO; 12	BSB; 11	CGD; 17	INT; 14	22nd	23
2005	RS Competições	Chevrolet Astra	INT; 4	CTB; 8	RIO; 8	INT; 26	CTB; 18	LON; Ret	BSB; 8	SCZ; 4	TAR; 16	ARG; Ret	RIO; 7	INT; 20	11th	61
2006	Scuderia 111	Chevrolet Astra	INT; Ret	CTB; 14	CGD; 6	INT; 6	LON; 16	CTB; Ret	SCZ; Ret	BSB; 11	TAR; Ret	ARG; 4	RIO; 21	INT; 14	18th	43
2007	Officer Motorsport	Mitsubishi Lancer	INT; 17	CTB; Ret	CGD; Ret	INT; 18	LON; 6	SCZ; Ret	CTB; 11	BSB; 23	ARG; 8	TAR; 27	RIO; 12	INT; 18	21st	35
2008	Officer Motorsport	Mitsubishi Lancer	INT; 9	BSB; 16	CTB; 9	SCZ; 5	CGD; 23	INT; 8	RIO; 18	LON; 13	CTB; Ret	BSB; 9	TAR; 10	INT; Ret	15th	36
2009	Officer Motorsport	Chevrolet Vectra	INT; 5	CTB; Ret	BSB; 12	SCZ; 14	INT; 15	SAL; Ret	RIO; 11	CGD; 23	CTB; 23	BSB; 9	TAR; 11	INT; 23	19th	26
2010	FTS-Mobil Racing	Chevrolet Vectra	INT; 3	CTB; 3	VEL; 17	RIO; 10	RBP; 12	SAL; 4	INT; 6	CGD; 1	LON; 8	SCZ; Ret	BSB; 11	CTB; 17	6th	230
2011	FTS-Mobil Racing	Chevrolet Vectra	CTB; Ret	INT; 23	RBP; Ret	VEL; Ret	CGD; 21	RIO; 24	INT; 4	SAL; 9	SCZ; 8	LON; 10	BSB; Ret	VEL; 14	17th	29
2012	Mobil Super Pioneer Racing	Chevrolet Sonic	INT; 7	CTB; 10	VEL; 9	RBP; 14	LON; 11	RIO; 6	SAL; Ret	CGD; 5	TAR; 9	CTB; 6	BSB; 3	INT; 25	9th	130
2013	Mobil Super Pioneer Racing	Chevrolet Sonic	INT; 24	CTB; 14	TAR; 17	SAL; 6	BSB; DSQ	CAS; 25	RBP; 7	CAS; 9	VEL; Ret	CTB; DSQ	BSB; 17	INT; 11	15th	76

=== Complete European Le Mans Series results ===
(key) (Races in bold indicate pole position; races in italics indicate fastest lap)

Year	Entrant	Class	Chassis	Engine	1	2	3	4	5	6	Pos.	Pts
2007	Dener Motorsport	GT2	Porsche 997 GT3 RSR	Porsche 3.8L Flat-6	MNZ	VAL	NÜR	SPA	SIL	INT; 5	40th	4

=== Complete Porsche Supercup results ===
(key) (Races in bold indicate pole position) (Races in italics indicate fastest lap)

Year	Team	1	2	3	4	5	6	7	8	9	DC	Points
2013	Team Allyouneed by Project 1	ESP	MON	GBR	GER	HUN	BEL	ITA; 21	UAE	UAE	NC	0

^{*} Season still in progress.
