= Valdeno Brito =

Brazilian racing driver

- Nationality: (Brazil) Brazilian
- Born: Valdeno Brito Filho; June 29, 1974 (age 52) Campina Grande, Brazil

Stock Car Brasil career
- Current team: Cosan Mobil Super Racing
- Categorisation: FIA Gold (until 2019); FIA Silver (2020–)
- Car number: 77
- Starts: 164
- Championships: 0
- Wins: 8
- Poles: 8

Valdeno Brito Filho (born June 29, 1974 in Campina Grande) is a Brazilian racing driver. He has raced in such series as Porsche Supercup and Stock Car Brasil.

== Racing record ==
=== Complete Porsche Supercup results ===
(key) (Races in bold indicate pole position) (Races in italics indicate fastest lap)

| Year | Team | Car | 1 | 2 | 3 | 4 | 5 | 6 | 7 | 8 | 9 | 10 | 11 | 12 | 13 | DC | Points |
|---|---|---|---|---|---|---|---|---|---|---|---|---|---|---|---|---|---|
| 2009 | Konrad Motorsport | Porsche 997 GT3 | BHR | BHR | ESP | MON | TUR | GBR | GER | HUN | ESP; Ret | BEL; 7 | ITA | UAE | UAE | N/A‡ | NC‡ |

‡ – As Brito was a guest driver, he was ineligible to score points.

=== Complete Stock Car Brasil results ===
| Year | Team | Car | 1 | 2 | 3 | 4 | 5 | 6 | 7 | 8 | 9 | 10 | 11 | 12 | 13 | 14 | 15 | 16 | 17 | 18 | 19 | 20 | 21 | Rank | Points |
|---|---|---|---|---|---|---|---|---|---|---|---|---|---|---|---|---|---|---|---|---|---|---|---|---|---|
| 2004 | Nascar Motorsport | Chevrolet Astra | CTB; Ret | INT; Ret | TAR; 11 | LON; 7 | RIO; 20 | | | | | | | | | | | | | | | | | 21st | 24 |
| 2004 | L&M Racing | Chevrolet Astra | | | | | | INT; 6 | CTB; Ret | LON; Ret | RIO; Ret | BSB; 20 | CGD; Ret | INT; Ret | | | | | | | | | | 21st | 24 |
| 2005 | Nascar Motorsport | Mitsubishi Lancer | INT; Ret | CTB; 3 | RIO; 16 | INT; Ret | CTB; Ret | LON; Ret | BSB; 3 | SCZ; Ret | TAR; 2 | ARG; Ret | RIO; 10 | INT; 25 | | | | | | | | | | 12th | 58 |
| 2006 | L&M Racing | Chevrolet Astra | INT; Ret | CTB; Ret | CGD; Ret | INT; 3 | LON; Ret | CTB; Ret | SCZ; EX | BSB; 7 | TAR; 2 | ARG; Ret | RIO; 22 | INT; Ret | | | | | | | | | | 17th | 45 |
| 2007 | JF Racing | Peugeot 307 | INT; 24 | CTB; 20 | CGD; Ret | INT; 13 | LON; 2 | SCZ; 4 | CTB; 4 | **BSB**; Ret | ARG; 14 | TAR; Ret | RIO; 11 | INT; 2 | | | | | | | | | | 7th | 237 |
| 2008 | Medley-A.Mattheis | Chevrolet Astra | INT; Ret | BSB; Ret | **CTB**; 3 | SCZ; 2 | CGD; Ret | INT; Ret | RIO; 1 | LON; 16 | CTB; 23 | BSB; 27 | TAR; 5 | INT; 6 | | | | | | | | | | 5th | 234 |
| 2009 | RCM Motorsport | Peugeot 307 | INT; 11 | **CTB**; 1 | BSB; 10 | SCZ; 6 | INT; 17 | SAL; 7 | RIO; 8 | CGD; 4 | CTB; Ret | BSB; 5 | TAR; DNS | INT; 8 | | | | | | | | | | 8th | 243 |
| 2010 | FTS-Mobil Racing | Chevrolet Vectra | INT; Ret | CTB; 5 | **VEL**; Ret | RIO; Ret | RBP; 17 | SAL; 8 | INT; 19 | CGD; Ret | LON; 9 | SCZ; 2 | BSB; 17 | CTB; Ret | | | | | | | | | | 14th | 47 |
| 2011 | FTS-Mobil Racing | Chevrolet Vectra | CTB; Ret | INT; 13 | RBP; 15 | VEL; Ret | CGD; 8 | RIO; 13 | INT; 19 | SAL; 12 | SCZ; 6 | LON; DSQ | BSB; 1 | VEL; Ret | | | | | | | | | | 14th | 54 |
| 2012 | Shell Racing | Peugeot 408 | INT; 9 | CTB; 1 | VEL; 5 | RBP; Ret | LON; 6 | RIO; 14 | SAL; Ret | CAS; 1 | TAR; 6 | CTB; 4 | BSB; 10 | INT; 27 | | | | | | | | | | 7th | 137 |
| 2013 | Shell Racing | Peugeot 408 | INT; 2 | CUR; 4 | TAR; 7 | SAL; 25 | BRA; DSQ | CAS; 10 | RBP; 3 | BRA; 10 | VEL; 4 | CUR; 9 | GOI; 9 | INT; 10 | | | | | | | | | | 6th | 154 |
| 2014 | Shell Racing | Chevrolet Sonic | INT; 1; 2 | SCZ; 1 | SCZ; 2 | BRA; 1 | BRA; 2 | GOI; 1 | GOI; 2 | INT; 1 | CAS; 1 | CAS; 2 | CUR; 1 | CUR; 2 | VEL; 1 | VEL; 2 | SAL; 1 | SAL; 2 | CUR; 1 | CUR; 2 | TAR; 1 | TAR; 2 | BRA; 1 | **2nd*** | **11*** |
