= Circuito Ayrton Senna =

Street circuit in Salvador, Bahia, Brazil

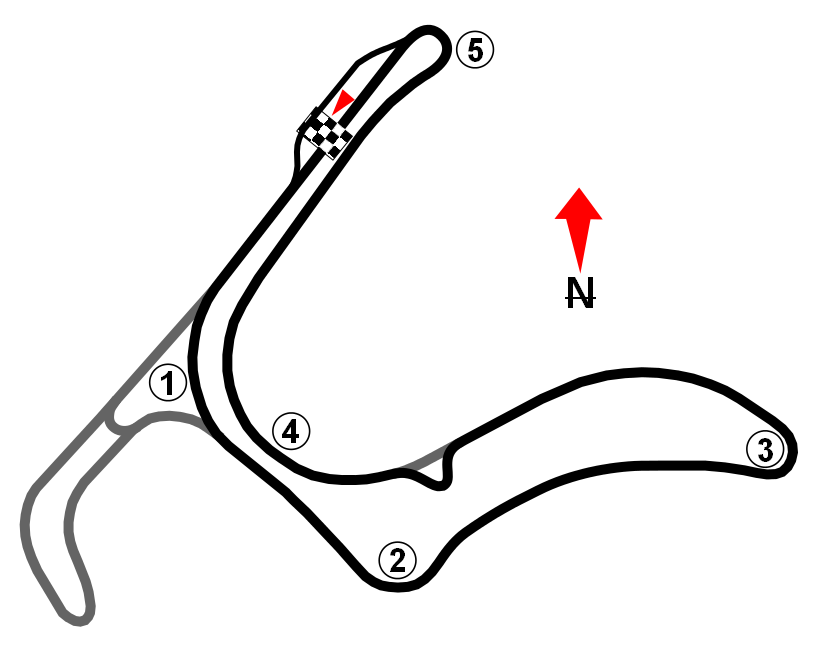
- Street Circuit (2010–2014)
- Location: Salvador, Bahia, Brazil
- Coordinates: 12°56′51″S 38°25′41″W
- Capacity: 60,000
- Opened: 9 August 2009; 16 years ago
- Closed: 15 November 2014; 11 years ago
- Major events: Stock Car Brasil (2009–2014); Mercedes-Benz Challenge (2014)

Street Circuit (2010–2014)
- Length: 2.724 km (1.693 mi)
- Turns: 12
- Race lap record: 1:10.444 ( (Brazil) Thiago Camilo, Chevrolet Vectra, 2010, Stock Car Brasil)

Street Circuit (2009)
- Length: 2.724 km (1.693 mi)
- Turns: 7
- Race lap record: 1:07.620 ( (Brazil) Duda Pamplona, Chevrolet Vectra, 2009, Stock Car Brasil)

The Circuito Ayrton Senna, also known as CAB circuit, was a 2.724 km (1.693 mi) street circuit opened in 2009, located in Salvador, Bahia. The curves that made up the circuit's 2.724 km (1.693 mi) were the Curva dos Orixás, Curva do Acarajé, Curva da Balança, Curva do Dendê and Curva da Vitória.

Cacá Bueno and Allam Khodair were the most successful drivers on the circuit, both won 2 races. The circuit was closed after the race in 2014.

== Lap records ==
The fastest official lap records at the Circuito Ayrton Senna are listed as:

Category	Time	Driver	Vehicle	Event
Street Circuit (2010–2014): 2.724 km (1.693 mi)
Stock Car Brasil	1:10.444	Thiago Camilo	Chevrolet Vectra	2010 Salvador Stock Car Brasil round
Street Circuit (2009): 2.724 km (1.693 mi)
Stock Car Brasil	1:07.620	Duda Pamplona	Chevrolet Vectra	2009 Salvador Stock Car Brasil round
