= Gramacho Competições =

(Brazil) Gramacho Competições
- Founded: 2002
- Folded: 2013
- Team principal(s): Alexandre Gramacho
- Former series: Stock Car Brasil; Stock Light

Gramacho Competições was a Brazilian motorsport team owned by Alexandre Gramacho created in 2002 in Brasília, Brazil. The team closed in 2013.
