= Duda Pamplona =

Brazilian auto racing driver (born 1978)

Daniel Serra
- Nationality: (Brazil) Brazilian
- Born: January 27, 1978 (age 48) Rio de Janeiro (Brazil)

Stock Car Brasil career
- Debut season: 2001
- Current team: Officer ProGP
- Car number: 23
- Starts: 115
- Wins: 1
- Poles: 7
- Fastest laps: 3
- Best finish: 6th in 2005

Previous series
- 1997 1998–2000 2010 2011: Formula Chevrolet Brazil; Formula Three Sudamericana; Trofeo Linea Brasil; Brasileiro de Marcas

Championship titles
- 1997: Formula Chevrolet Brazil

Eduardo “Duda” Pamplona (born 27 January 1978 in Rio de Janeiro) is a Brazilian auto racing driver. He competed in Stock Car Brasil from 2001 to 2013, resulting sixth in 2005 and 12th in 2007 with one win each season. Pamplona is an owner and driver of the Officer ProGP team.
