= 2014 Brasileiro de Marcas =

Car racing competition

Seasons
- ← 2013 2015 →

The 2014 Copa Petrobrás de Marcas season was the fourth season of the Brasileiro de Marcas. It began on April 6 at Tarumã and ended on November 23 at Brasília, after fifteen races.

JLM Racing driver Ricardo Maurício won his third consecutive Brasileiro de Marcas title, taking three victories during the season including a win with Max Wilson in the wildcard race at Interlagos. Consistency was the key to his title, finishing all but one race in the top nine placings, sealing it with a third-place finish in the opening race at the final round at Goiânia. Maurício's championship-winning margin was three points – after dropped scores were implemented – over his team-mate Vicente Orige, a race-winner at Goiânia, taking advantage of the series' double-points rules for the final meeting. Despite missing the first round, Allam Khodair finished third in the championship, also with three victories.

Other drivers to take victories during the season were Gabriel Casagrande, who won races at Brasília and Curitiba, while Vítor Meira (Tarumã), Galid Osman (Goiânia), Thiago Camilo (Curitiba, on a one-off appearance), as well as Velopark winners Alceu Feldmann and Denis Navarro, all took single race victories during the season. With the performances of Maurício and Orige, JLM Racing were the winners of the teams' championship, comfortably ahead of RZ Motorsport Toyota, with their drivers Khodair and Osman. In the manufacturers' championship, Toyota finished 14 points clear of Honda to win the championship.

== Teams and drivers ==
All drivers were Brazilian-registered.

Team	Car	No.	Drivers	Rounds
MMX Racing	Mitsubishi Lancer GT	00	Gustavo Martins	1–5
MMX Racing	Mitsubishi Lancer GT	7	Beto Cavaleiro	6
MMX Racing	Mitsubishi Lancer GT	15	Celso Shuler	6
MMX Racing	Mitsubishi Lancer GT	15	Cleber Shuler	6
MMX Racing	Mitsubishi Lancer GT	27	Wilson Pinheiro	1
MMX Racing	Mitsubishi Lancer GT	27	Caito Vianna	1
MMX Racing	Mitsubishi Lancer GT	72	André Cupello	2–4
MMX Racing	Mitsubishi Lancer GT	72	Lucas Molo	5
J. Star Racing	Chevrolet Cruze	1	Thiago Marques	All
J. Star Racing	Chevrolet Cruze	17	Daniel Kaefer	All
Amir Nasr Racing	Ford Focus	3	Vítor Meira	1–2, 4–8
Amir Nasr Racing	Ford Focus	20	Fábio Ebrahim	5
Amir Nasr Racing	Ford Focus	26	Wellington Justino	2–4
Amir Nasr Racing	Ford Focus	30	Vitor Genz	1
Amir Nasr Racing	Ford Focus	36	Valdeno Brito	3
Amir Nasr Racing	Ford Focus	59	Renan Guerra	8
Amir Nasr Racing	Ford Focus	65	Victor Corrêa	7
Amir Nasr Racing	Ford Focus	66	Felipe Guimarães	6
C2 Team	Chevrolet Cruze	4	Renato Constantino	2
C2 Team	Chevrolet Cruze	8	Iago Césario	4–8
C2 Team	Chevrolet Cruze	8	Iury Césario	4–8
C2 Team	Chevrolet Cruze	34	Fabio Casagrande	1
C2 Team	Chevrolet Cruze	40	Fábio Carbone	3
C2 Team	Chevrolet Cruze	83	Gabriel Casagrande	All
Toyota Bassani	Toyota Corolla XRS	5	Denis Navarro	All
Toyota Bassani	Toyota Corolla XRS	77	Felipe Gama	All
Full Time Sports	Honda Civic	13	Eduardo Rocha	1–4, 6–8
Full Time Sports	Honda Civic	21	Thiago Camilo	5
Full Time Sports	Honda Civic	82	Alceu Feldmann	All
RZ Motorsport Toyota	Toyota Corolla XRS	18	Allam Khodair	2–8
RZ Motorsport Toyota	Toyota Corolla XRS	26	Wellington Justino	1
RZ Motorsport Toyota	Toyota Corolla XRS	28	Galid Osman	All
Ebrahim/AGB Motors	Mitsubishi Lancer GT	20	Fabio Ebrahim	7–8
Ebrahim/AGB Motors	Mitsubishi Lancer GT	45	Thiago Oliveira	7–8
Ebrahim/AGB Motors	Mitsubishi Lancer GT	45	Fernando Miranda	7–8
JLM Racing	Honda Civic	43	Vicente Orige	All
JLM Racing	Honda Civic	90	Ricardo Maurício	All
Júpiter Racing Team	Ford Focus	98	César Bonilha	All
Júpiter Racing Team	Ford Focus	99	Carlos Eduardo Souza	All

Interlagos entries
Team	No.	Season driver	Wildcard driver
MMX Racing	00	Gustavo Martins	Marcos Gomes
MMX Racing	72	André Cupello	Lucas Molo
J. Star Racing	1	Thiago Marques	Serafin Júnior
J. Star Racing	17	Daniel Kaefer	Fábio Fogaça
Toyota Bassani	5	Denis Navarro	Sérgio Jimenez
Toyota Bassani	77	Felipe Gama	André Bragantini
Full Time Sports	13	Eduardo Rocha	Cacá Bueno
Full Time Sports	82	Alceu Feldmann	Thiago Camilo
RZ Motorsport Toyota	18	Allam Khodair	Ricardo Zonta
RZ Motorsport Toyota	28	Galid Osman	Felipe Lapenna
Amir Nasr Racing	26	Wellington Justino	Diego Freitas
Amir Nasr Racing	36	Valdeno Brito	Antônio Pizzonia
C2 Team	40	Fábio Carbone	Diego Nunes
C2 Team	83	Gabriel Casagrande	Júlio Campos
JLM Racing	43	Vicente Orige	Juliano Moro
JLM Racing	90	Ricardo Maurício	Max Wilson
Júpiter Racing Team	98	César Bonilha	Ulisses Silva
Júpiter Racing Team	99	Carlos Eduardo Souza	Rafael Iserhard

== Race calendar and results ==
All races were held in Brazil.

Round		Circuit	Date	Pole position	Fastest lap	Winning driver	Winning team
1	R1	Autódromo Internacional de Tarumã	April 6	Ricardo Maurício	Ricardo Maurício	Ricardo Maurício	JLM Racing
1	R2	Autódromo Internacional de Tarumã	April 6		Vítor Meira	Vítor Meira	Amir Nasr Racing
2	R1	Autódromo Internacional Nelson Piquet	May 4	Gabriel Casagrande	Gabriel Casagrande	Gabriel Casagrande	C2 Team
2	R2	Autódromo Internacional Nelson Piquet	May 4		Gustavo Martins	Ricardo Maurício	JLM Racing
3		Autódromo José Carlos Pace	May 25	Allam Khodair Ricardo Zonta	Valdeno Brito	Ricardo Maurício Max Wilson	JLM Racing
4	R1	Autódromo Internacional Ayrton Senna	June 8	Galid Osman	Allam Khodair	Allam Khodair	RZ Motorsport Toyota
4	R2	Autódromo Internacional Ayrton Senna	June 8		Galid Osman	Galid Osman	RZ Motorsport Toyota
5	R1	Autódromo Internacional de Curitiba	July 27	Allam Khodair	Denis Navarro	Allam Khodair	RZ Motorsport Toyota
5	R2	Autódromo Internacional de Curitiba	July 27		Thiago Camilo	Thiago Camilo	Full Time Sports
6	R1	Velopark, Nova Santa Rita	September 7	Ricardo Maurício	Ricardo Maurício	Alceu Feldmann	Full Time Sports
6	R2	Velopark, Nova Santa Rita	September 7		Cesar Bonilha	Denis Navarro	Toyota Bassani
7	R1	Autódromo Internacional de Curitiba	October 19	Denis Navarro	Galid Osman	Gabriel Casagrande	C2 Team
7	R2	Autódromo Internacional de Curitiba	October 19		Felipe Gama	Felipe Gama	Toyota Bassani
8	R1	Autódromo Internacional Ayrton Senna	November 23	Ricardo Maurício	Alceu Feldmann	Allam Khodair	RZ Motorsport Toyota
8	R2	Autódromo Internacional Ayrton Senna	November 23		Ricardo Maurício	Vicente Orige	JLM Racing

== Championship standings ==
- Points were awarded as follows:

Position	1	2	3	4	5	6	7	8	9	10	11	12	13	14	15
Standard	23	20	18	16	14	12	10	8	7	6	5	4	3	2	1
R14/R15	46	40	36	32	28	24	20	16	14	12	10	8	6	4	2

=== Drivers' Championship ===
Pos	Driver	TAR		BRA		INT	GOI		CUR		VEL		CUR		GOI		Pts
1	Ricardo Maurício	**1**	7	6	1	1	7	8	4	6	**5**	2	9	5	**3**	Ret	221
2	Vicente Orige	7	2	Ret	4	3	8	**Ret**	6	3	Ret	4	5	Ret	2	1	218
3	Allam Khodair			2	Ret	**2**	1	9	**1**	7	Ret	Ret	Ret	7	1	3	195
4	Gabriel Casagrande	6	Ret	**1**	11	11	6	10	8	**2**	DSQ	Ret	1	2	12	2	182
5	Vítor Meira	8	**1**	5	3		9	7	Ret	Ret	9	NC	6	4	4	4	179
6	Alceu Feldmann	Ret	9	8	**2**	5	2	Ret	7	4	1	6	7	10	10	7	178
7	Felipe Gama	3	5	3	7	10	14	DSQ	10	15	2	5	10	1	5	11	173
8	Galid Osman	4	Ret	4	8	8	**13**	1	11	9	4	Ret	3	6	8	**6**	172
9	Denis Navarro	2	4	Ret	Ret	4	Ret	Ret	2	8	Ret	1	**2**	3	16	5	171
10	Cesar Bonilha	11	11	9	6	15	5	2	Ret	14	Ret	3	4	11	9	8	135
11	Eduardo Rocha	15	Ret	10	10	9	11	5			3	7	Ret	Ret	6	9	105
12	Thiago Marques	5	3	7	Ret	14	Ret	Ret	5	5	6	Ret	Ret	Ret	13	Ret	90
13	Carlos Eduardo Souza	12	12	11	DSQ	12	4	3	9	13	Ret	Ret	Ret	Ret	11	Ret	71
14	Gustavo Martins	13	10	Ret	5	7	3	6	Ret	12							67
15	Daniel Kaefer	14	Ret	Ret	12	13	10	4	14	10	7	Ret	Ret	Ret	Ret	12	57
16	Thiago Camilo								3	1							41
17	Iury Césario						DSQ	Ret*	13	16*	Ret	9*	Ret	12*	7	Ret*	34
17	Iago Césario						DSQ*	Ret	13*	16	Ret*	9	Ret*	12	7*	Ret	34
18	Fábio Ebrahim								Ret	11			8	**Ret**	Ret	10	20
19	Vitor Genz	10	6														18
20	Thiago Oliveira												11	9	14	Ret	16
20	Fernando Miranda												11*	9	14*	Ret	16
21	Wellington Justino	9	8	12	9	16	12	Ret									15
22	Valdeno Brito					6											12
22	Victor Corrêa												12	8			12
24	Beto Cavaleiro										Ret	8					8
24	Celso Schuler										8*	**Ret**					8
24	Vinicius Schuler										8	**Ret***					8
25	Felipe Guimarães										10	Ret					6
26	André Cupello			DNS	DNS	Ret	15	Ret*	12	17*							5
26	Lucas Molo					Ret	15*	Ret	12*	17							5
27	Fábio Casagrande	16	13														3
	Wilson Pinheiro	NC	Ret*														0
	Caito Vianna	NC*	Ret														0
	Renato Constantino			Ret	Ret												0
	Fábio Carbone					Ret											0
Guest drivers ineligible to score points
	Max Wilson					1											0
	Ricardo Zonta					**2**											0
	Juliano Moro					3											0
	Sérgio Jimenez					4											0
	Thiago Camilo					5											0
	Antônio Pizzonia					6											0
	Marcos Gomes					7											0
	Felipe Lapenna					8											0
	Cacá Bueno					9											0
	André Bragantini					10											0
	Júlio Campos					11											0
	Rafael Isehard					12											0
	Fabio Fogaça					13											0
	Serafin Junior					14											0
	Renan Guerra														15	Ret	0
	Ulisses Silva					15											0
	Diego Freitas					16											0
	Diego Nunes					Ret											0
Pos	Driver	TAR		BRA		INT	GOI		CUR		VEL		CUR		GOI		Pts

Colour	Result
Gold	Winner
Silver	Second place
Bronze	Third place
Green	Points classification
Blue	Non-points classification
Blue	Non-classified finish (NC)
Purple	Retired, not classified (Ret)
Red	Did not qualify (DNQ)
Red	Did not pre-qualify (DNPQ)
Black	Disqualified (DSQ)
White	Did not start (DNS)
White	Withdrew (WD)
White	Race cancelled (C)
Blank	Did not practice (DNP)
Blank	Did not arrive (DNA)
Blank	Excluded (EX)

**Bold** — Pole position
Italics — Fastest lap
* — Driver did not race, but scored points with partner.

=== Manufacturers' Championship ===
Pos	Manufacturer	TAR		BRA		INT	GOI		CUR		VEL		CUR		GOI		Pts
1	Toyota	2	4	2	7	2	1	1	1	7	2	1	2	1	1	3	531
1	Toyota	3	5	3	8	4	13	9	2	8	4	5	3	3	5	5	531
2	Honda	1	2	6	1	1	2	5	3	1	1	2	5	5	2	1	517
2	Honda	7	7	8	2	3	7	8	4	3	3	4	7	10	3	7	517
3	Ford	8	1	5	3	6	4	2	9	11	9	3	4	4	4	4	361
3	Ford	10	6	9	6	12	5	3	Ret	13	10	NC	6	8	9	8	361
4	Chevrolet	5	3	1	11	11	6	4	5	2	6	9	1	2	7	2	330
4	Chevrolet	6	13	7	12	13	10	10	8	5	7	Ret	Ret	12	13	12	330
5	Mitsubishi	13	10	Ret	5	7	3	6	12	12	8	8	8	9	14	10	121
5	Mitsubishi	NC	Ret	DNS	DNS	Ret	15	Ret	Ret	17	Ret	Ret	11	Ret	Ret	Ret	121
Pos	Manufacturer	TAR		BRA		INT	GOI		CUR		VEL		CUR		GOI		Pts

=== Teams' Championship ===
Pos	Team	TAR		BRA		INT	GOI		CUR		VEL		CUR		GOI		Pts
1	JLM Racing	1	2	6	1	1	7	8	4	3	5	2	5	5	2	1	446
1	JLM Racing	7	7	Ret	4	3	8	Ret	6	6	Ret	4	9	Ret	3	Ret	446
2	RZ Motorsport Toyota	4	8	2	8	2	1	1	1	7	4	Ret	3	6	1	3	382
2	RZ Motorsport Toyota	9	Ret	4	Ret	8	13	9	11	9	Ret	Ret	Ret	7	8	6	382
3	Toyota Bassani	2	4	3	7	4	14	Ret	2	8	2	1	2	1	5	5	347
3	Toyota Bassani	3	5	Ret	Ret	10	Ret	DSQ	10	15	Ret	5	10	3	16	11	347
4	Full Time Sports	15	9	8	2	5	2	5	3	1	1	6	7	10	6	9	324
4	Full Time Sports	Ret	Ret	10	10	9	11	Ret	7	4	3	7	Ret	Ret	7	10	324
5	Amir Nasr Racing	8	1	5	3	6	9	7	Ret	11	9	NC	6	4	4	4	242
5	Amir Nasr Racing	10	6	12	9	16	12	Ret	Ret	Ret	10	Ret	12	8	15	Ret	242
6	C2 Team	6	13	1	11	11	6	10	8	2	Ret	9	1	2	7	2	219
6	C2 Team	16	Ret	Ret	Ret	Ret	DSQ	Ret	13	16	DSQ	Ret	Ret	12	12	Ret	219
7	Júpiter Racing Team	11	11	9	6	12	4	2	9	13	Ret	3	4	11	9	8	206
7	Júpiter Racing Team	12	12	11	DSQ	15	5	3	Ret	14	Ret	Ret	Ret	Ret	11	Ret	206
8	J. Star Racing	5	3	7	12	13	10	4	5	5	6	Ret	Ret	Ret	13	12	111
8	J. Star Racing	14	Ret	Ret	Ret	14	Ret	Ret	14	10	7	Ret	Ret	Ret	Ret	Ret	111
9	MMX Racing	13	10	Ret	5	7	3	6	12	12							72
9	MMX Racing	NC	Ret	DNS	DNS	Ret	15	Ret	Ret	17							72
10	Ebrahim/AGB Motors												8	9	14	10	36
10	Ebrahim/AGB Motors												11	Ret	Ret	Ret	36
Pos	Team	TAR		BRA		INT	GOI		CUR		VEL		CUR		GOI		Pts

Colour	Result
Gold	Winner
Silver	Second place
Bronze	Third place
Green	Points classification
Blue	Non-points classification
Blue	Non-classified finish (NC)
Purple	Retired, not classified (Ret)
Red	Did not qualify (DNQ)
Red	Did not pre-qualify (DNPQ)
Black	Disqualified (DSQ)
White	Did not start (DNS)
White	Withdrew (WD)
White	Race cancelled (C)
Blank	Did not practice (DNP)
Blank	Did not arrive (DNA)
Blank	Excluded (EX)
