= 2013 Brasileiro de Marcas =

Brazilian car racing season

Seasons
- ← 2012 2014 →

The 2013 Brasileiro de Marcas season (officially the 2013 Copa Petrobrás de Marcas) was the third season of the Brasileiro de Marcas. It began on April 7 at Interlagos and ended on December 1 at Curitiba, after sixteen races.

== Teams and drivers ==
All drivers were Brazilian-registered.

Team	Car	No.	Drivers	Rounds
Amir Nasr Racing	Ford Focus	1	Thiago Marques	All
Amir Nasr Racing	Ford Focus	3	Vítor Meira	All
Amir Nasr Racing	Ford Focus	7	Valdeno Brito	All
Amir Nasr Racing	Ford Focus	11	André Massuh	All
Amir Nasr Racing	Ford Focus	21	Thiago Camilo	All
Amir Nasr Racing	Ford Focus	30	Serafin Júnior	All
Amir Nasr Racing	Ford Focus	46	Vitor Genz	All
Amir Nasr Racing	Ford Focus	83	José Cordova	All
Amir Nasr Racing	Ford Focus	98	Marco Romanini	All
Toyota RZ	Toyota Corolla XRS	1	Thiago Marques	All
Toyota RZ	Toyota Corolla XRS	10	Ricardo Zonta	All
Toyota RZ	Toyota Corolla XRS	28	Galid Osman	All
J. Star Racing	Chevrolet Cruze	1	Thiago Marques	All
J. Star Racing	Chevrolet Cruze	11	Marcus Leão	All
J. Star Racing	Chevrolet Cruze	18	Allam Khodair	1, 3–4
J. Star Racing	Chevrolet Cruze	32	Fernando Fortes	2
J. Star Racing	Chevrolet Cruze	69	Daniel Kaefer	7–8
J. Star Racing	Chevrolet Cruze	88	Leandro Romera	1, 6
J. Star Racing	Chevrolet Cruze	88	Wilson Pinheiro	6
Toyota Bassani	Toyota Corolla XRS	2	Pedro Nunes	1–7
Toyota Bassani	Toyota Corolla XRS	5	Denis Navarro	All
Toyota Bassani	Toyota Corolla XRS	26	Wellington Justino	8
Carlos Alves Competições	Chevrolet Cruze	4	Júlio Campos	1–5
Carlos Alves Competições	Chevrolet Cruze	4	Gabriel Casagrande	1–7
Carlos Alves Competições	Chevrolet Cruze	49	Lauro Aita Carvalho	6
Carlos Alves Competições	Chevrolet Cruze	53	Guilherme Sperafico	7
Carlos Alves Competições	Chevrolet Cruze	54	Marcelo Karan	8
Carlos Alves Competições	Chevrolet Cruze	67	André Bragantini	8
Carlos Alves Competições	Chevrolet Cruze	71	Gustavo Martins	1–2
Carlos Alves Competições	Chevrolet Cruze	71	Raulino Kreis Jr.	1–4
Carlos Alves Competições	Chevrolet Cruze	71	Marco Cozzi	3
Carlos Alves Competições	Chevrolet Cruze	75	Renato Constantino	5
Petrópolis Competições	Mitsubishi Lancer GT	13	Eduardo Rocha	1–5, 7–8
Petrópolis Competições	Mitsubishi Lancer GT	48	Cléber Schuler	6
Petrópolis Competições	Mitsubishi Lancer GT	67	André Bragantini	3
Officer ProGP	Mitisubishi Lancer GT	16	Fernando Nienkotter	1–5
Officer ProGP	Mitisubishi Lancer GT	17	Leonardo Nienkotter	1–5
Officer ProGP	Mitisubishi Lancer GT	30	Serafin Júnior	7–8
Officer ProGP	Mitisubishi Lancer GT	42	Luir Miranda	6
Officer ProGP	Mitisubishi Lancer GT	71	Gustavo Martins	6–8
Cesinha Competições	Ford Focus	25	Jaidson Zini	3–8
Cesinha Competições	Ford Focus	99	Cesar Bonilha	2–8
Cesinha Competições	Ford Focus	99	Carlos Eduardo	2–8
JLM Racing	Honda Civic	44	Vicente Orige	All
JLM Racing	Honda Civic	90	Ricardo Maurício	All
Full Time Sports	Honda Civic	77	Felipe Gama	All
Full Time Sports	Honda Civic	82	Alceu Feldmann	All

== Race calendar and results ==
All races were held in Brazil.

Round		Circuit	Date	Pole position	Fastest lap	Winning driver	Winning team
1	R1	Autódromo José Carlos Pace	April 7	Vicente Orige	Ricardo Maurício	Ricardo Maurício	JLM Racing
1	R2	Autódromo José Carlos Pace	April 7		Leandro Romera	Leandro Romera	J. Star Racing
2	R1	Autódromo Internacional Nelson Piquet	April 21	Galid Osman	Denis Navarro	Galid Osman	Toyota RZ
2	R2	Autódromo Internacional Nelson Piquet	April 21		Denis Navarro	Galid Osman	Toyota RZ
3	R1	Autódromo José Carlos Pace	July 21	Ricardo Zonta	Ricardo Zonta	Ricardo Zonta	Toyota RZ
3	R2	Autódromo José Carlos Pace	July 21		Felipe Gama	Ricardo Zonta	Toyota RZ
4	R1	Autódromo Internacional de Curitiba	August 25	Vítor Meira	Ricardo Maurício	Ricardo Maurício	JLM Racing
4	R2	Autódromo Internacional de Curitiba	August 25		Alceu Feldmann	Vítor Meira	Amir Nasr Racing
5	R1	Autódromo Internacional Nelson Piquet	September 29	Denis Navarro	Vítor Meira	Denis Navarro	Toyota Bassani
5	R2	Autódromo Internacional Nelson Piquet	September 29		Vicente Orige	Vicente Orige	JLM Racing
6	R1	Autódromo Internacional de Tarumã	October 27	Felipe Gama	Felipe Gama	Felipe Gama	Full Time Sports
6	R2	Autódromo Internacional de Tarumã	October 27		Ricardo Maurício	Ricardo Maurício	JLM Racing
7	R1	Autódromo Internacional de Cascavel	November 17	Felipe Gama	Pedro Nunes	Felipe Gama	Full Time Sports
7	R2	Autódromo Internacional de Cascavel	November 17		Vicente Orige	Felipe Gama	Full Time Sports
8	R1	Autódromo Internacional de Curitiba	December 1	Denis Navarro	Denis Navarro	Denis Navarro	Toyota Bassani
8	R2	Autódromo Internacional de Curitiba	December 1		Denis Navarro	Ricardo Maurício	JLM Racing

== Championship standings ==
- Points were awarded as follows:

Position	1	2	3	4	5	6	7	8	9	10	11	12	13	14	15
Standard	25	20	16	14	12	10	9	8	7	6	5	4	3	2	1
R15/R16	50	40	32	28	24	20	18	16	14	12	10	8	6	4	2

=== Drivers' Championship ===
Pos	Driver	INT		BRA		INT		CUR		BRA		TAR		CAS		CUR		Pts
1	Ricardo Maurício	1	2	6	4	9	15	1	5	6	3	6	1	Ret	7	4	1	261
2	Denis Navarro	4	Ret	2	7	Ret	5	3	3	**1**	5	4	5	DSQ	8	**1**	5	232
3	Vítor Meira	WD	WD	Ret	10	5	10	**2**	1	2	2	9	8	6	5	2	4	214
4	Ricardo Zonta	3	5			**1**	1	9	4	9	4	2	9	12	3	6	6	207
5	Felipe Gama	11	8	4	Ret	Ret	Ret	10	6	5	7	**1**	3	**1**	1	15	2	199
6	Alceu Feldmann	6	3	3	3	Ret	8	7	2	7	8	3	7	2	Ret	3	Ret	189
7	Vicente Orige	**13**	Ret	9	Ret	7	4	Ret	7	8	**1**	5	4	Ret	4	5	3	171
8	Galid Osman	10	4	**1**	1	6	11	6	9	12	12	7	6	5	6	12	11	161
9	Leandro Romera	8	**1**	7	2	12	Ret	Ret	11			15	DNS*					72
9	Gabriel Casagrande	Ret*	13	14*	Ret	3*	6	16*	Ret	10	9*	DSQ	DNS	8	**2**			72
11	Pedro Nunes	9	Ret	15	Ret	10	9	17	8	4	14	12	13	4	Ret			69
12	Cesar Bonilha			Ret	Ret*	Ret	12*	13*	10	11*	6	13*	Ret	7	DSQ*	10*	9	66
12	Carlos Eduardo			Ret*	Ret	Ret*	12	13	10*	11	6*	13	Ret*	7*	DSQ	10	9*	66
13	Thiago Marques	7	11	5	6			5	13	Ret	10	8	**2**	9	12	14	15	51
14	Leonardo Nienkotter	Ret	9	13	5	8	**7**	8	**Ret**	Ret	DNS							47
15	Allam Khodair	2	6			16	Ret	4	Ret									44
15	Júlio Campos	Ret	13*	14	Ret*	3	6*	16	Ret*	10*	9							44
17	Fernando Nienkotter	Ret	10	11	Ret	11	3	15	Ret	Ret	11							38
18	Wellington Justino															7	8	34
18	Serafin Junior	Ret	12											Ret	DNS	8	**7**	34
18	Eduardo Rocha	12	Ret	Ret	9	15	Ret	11	Ret	WD	WD			Ret	11	Ret	10	34
21	Gustavo Martins	5	7	12*	DSQ							10	11	3	Ret	Ret	14	31
22	Jaidson Zini					14	14	12	12	DSQ	DNS	14	12	11	Ret	Ret	13	29
23	André Bragantini					2	2									9	12	22
24	Daniel Kaefer													Ret	9	11	16	17
25	Valdeno Brito									3	Ret							16
26	Thiago Camilo					4	Ret											14
26	André Massuh			10	8													14
26	Raulino Kreis Jr.	WD	WD	12	DSQ*	13	13*	14	14									14
29	Marco Romanini													10	10			12
30	Vitor Genz											11	10					11
31	Fernando Fortes			8	**DSQ**													8
32	Marco Cozzi					13*	13											6
32	José Cordova															13	Ret	6
34	Wilson Pinheiro											15*	DNS					1
	Renato Constantino									Ret	Ret							0
	Luir Miranda											Ret	Ret					0
	Lauro Aita Carvalho											Ret	Ret					0
	Cleber Schuler											Ret	Ret					0
	Guilherme Sperafico													Ret	Ret			0
	Marcelo Karan															Ret	Ret	0
Drivers ineligible for championship points
	Marcus Leão									Ret	13							0
Pos	Driver	INT		BRA		INT		CUR		BRA		TAR		CAS		CUR		Pts

Colour	Result
Gold	Winner
Silver	Second place
Bronze	Third place
Green	Points classification
Blue	Non-points classification
Blue	Non-classified finish (NC)
Purple	Retired, not classified (Ret)
Red	Did not qualify (DNQ)
Red	Did not pre-qualify (DNPQ)
Black	Disqualified (DSQ)
White	Did not start (DNS)
White	Withdrew (WD)
White	Race cancelled (C)
Blank	Did not practice (DNP)
Blank	Did not arrive (DNA)
Blank	Excluded (EX)

**Bold** – Pole
Italics – Fastest Lap

Notes:

- * — Driver did not race, but scored points with partner.

=== Manufacturers' Championship ===
Pos	Manufacturer	INT		BRA		INT		CUR		BRA		TAR		CAS		CUR		Pts
1	Honda	1	2	3	3	7	4	1	2	5	1	1	1	1	1	3	1	576
1	Honda	6	3	4	4	9	8	7	5	6	3	3	3	2	4	4	2	576
2	Toyota	3	4	1	1	1	1	3	3	1	4	2	5	4	3	1	5	503
2	Toyota	4	5	2	6	6	5	6	4	4	5	4	6	5	6	5	6	503
3	Ford	7	11	10	8	4	10	2	1	2	2	9	8	6	5	2	4	345
3	Ford	Ret	12	Ret	10	5	12	5	10	3	6	11	10	7	10	10	9	345
4	Chevrolet	2	1	7	2	3	6	4	11	10	9	8	2	8	2	9	12	271
4	Chevrolet	5	6	8	Ret	12	13	14	14	Ret	10	15	Ret	9	9	11	12	271
5	Mitsubishi	12	9	11	5	2	2	11	Ret	Ret	11	10	11	3	11	8	7	204
5	Mitsubishi	10	Ret	13	9	8	3	15	Ret	Ret	DNS	Ret	Ret	Ret	Ret	Ret	10	204
Pos	Manufacturer	INT		BRA		INT		CUR		BRA		TAR		CAS		CUR		Pts

=== Teams' Championship ===
Pos	Team	INT		BRA		INT		CUR		BRA		TAR		CAS		CUR		Pts
1	JLM Racing	1	2	6	4	7	4	1	5	6	1	5	1	Ret	4	4	1	419
1	JLM Racing	13	Ret	9	Ret	9	15	Ret	7	8	3	6	4	Ret	7	5	3	419
2	Full Time Sports	6	3	3	3	Ret	8	7	2	5	7	1	3	1	1	3	2	380
2	Full Time Sports	11	8	4	Ret	Ret	Ret	10	6	7	8	3	7	3	Ret	15	Ret	380
3	Toyota RZ	3	4	1	1	1	1	6	4	9	4	2	6	5	3	6	6	371
3	Toyota RZ	9	Ret	5	6	6	11	9	9	12	12	7	9	12	6	12	11	371
4	Toyota Bassani	4	Ret	2	7	10	5	3	3	1	5	4	5	4	8	1	5	329
4	Toyota Bassani	9	Ret	15	Ret	Ret	9	17	8	4	14	12	13	DSQ	Ret	7	8	329
5	Amir Nasr Racing	7	11	10	8	4	10	2	1	2	2	9	8	6	5	2	4	302
5	Amir Nasr Racing	Ret	12	Ret	10	5	Ret	5	13	3	Ret	11	10	10	10	13	Ret	302
6	J. Star Racing	2	1	7	2	12	Ret	4	11	Ret	10	8	2	9	9	11	15	197
6	J. Star Racing	8	6	8	DSQ	16	Ret	Ret	Ret	Ret	13	15	DNS	12	Ret	14	16	197
7	Officer ProGP	Ret	9	11	5	8	3	8	Ret	Ret	11	10	11	3	Ret	8	7	150
7	Officer ProGP	Ret	10	13	Ret	11	7	15	Ret	Ret	DNS	Ret	Ret	Ret	DNS	Ret	11	150
8	Carlos Alves Competições	5	7	12	Ret	3	6	14	14	10	9	Ret	Ret	8	2	9	12	129
8	Carlos Alves Competições	Ret	13	14	DSQ	13	13	16	Ret	Ret	Ret	DSQ	DNS	Ret	Ret	Ret	Ret	129
9	Cesinha Competições			Ret	Ret	14	12	12	10	11	6	13	12	7	Ret	10	9	95
9	Cesinha Competições					Ret	14	13	12	DSQ	DNS	14	Ret	11	DSQ	Ret	13	95
10	Petropolis Competições	12	Ret	Ret	9	2	2	11	Ret	WD	WD	Ret	Ret	Ret	11	Ret	10	74
10	Petropolis Competições					15	Ret											74
Pos	Team	INT		BRA		INT		CUR		BRA		TAR		CAS		CUR		Pts

Colour	Result
Gold	Winner
Silver	Second place
Bronze	Third place
Green	Points classification
Blue	Non-points classification
Blue	Non-classified finish (NC)
Purple	Retired, not classified (Ret)
Red	Did not qualify (DNQ)
Red	Did not pre-qualify (DNPQ)
Black	Disqualified (DSQ)
White	Did not start (DNS)
White	Withdrew (WD)
White	Race cancelled (C)
Blank	Did not practice (DNP)
Blank	Did not arrive (DNA)
Blank	Excluded (EX)
