= 2012 Brasileiro de Marcas =

Car racing competition

Seasons
- ← 2011 2013 →

The 2012 Brasileiro de Marcas season was the second season of the Brasileiro de Marcas. It begin on April 22 at the Interlagos and ended on December 2 at the Curitiba, after sixteen races. Several changes occurred in the championship. Mitsubishi entered with the 2012 version of Mitisubishi Lancer GT, Honda changed to the ninth generation Honda Civic, Chevrolet used Chevrolet Cruze which replaced the Chevrolet Astra, and Toyota became an official manufacturer on the championship with Toyota Corolla XRS.

Honda driver Ricardo Mauricio won the championship. He did not win any races, but finished on the podium at ten of sixteen. Toyota won the manufacturers' championship.

== Teams and drivers ==
All drivers were registered in Brazilian.

Team	Car	No.	Drivers	Rounds
JLM Racing	Honda Civic	0	Gustavo Martins	6
JLM Racing	Honda Civic	0	Vilson Jr.	6
JLM Racing	Honda Civic	2	Pedro Nunes	7–8
JLM Racing	Honda Civic	6	Juliano Moro	1–6
JLM Racing	Honda Civic	6	André Bragantini	All
JLM Racing	Honda Civic	47	Marconi de Abreu	1–5
RZ Motorsport	Toyota Corolla XRS	1	Thiago Marques	All
RZ Motorsport	Toyota Corolla XRS	10	Ricardo Zonta	All
Amir Nasr Racing	Ford Focus	3	Vítor Meira	All
Amir Nasr Racing	Ford Focus	30	Serafin Jr.	All
Bassani Racing	Toyota Corolla XRS	5	Denis Navarro	All
Bassani Racing	Toyota Corolla XRS	70	Diego Nunes	All
Full Time Sports	Honda Civic	7	Alceu Feldmann	1, 3–4
Full Time Sports	Honda Civic	20	Fabio Carbone	2
Full Time Sports	Honda Civic	55	Tiel de Andrade	5
Full Time Sports	Honda Civic	77	Felipe Gama	6–8
Full Time Sports	Honda Civic	90	Ricardo Maurício	All
J. Star Racing	Chevrolet Cruze	8	Marcelo Tomasoni	1
J. Star Racing	Chevrolet Cruze	57	Claudio Caparelli	2–8
J. Star Racing	Chevrolet Cruze	80	Marcos Gomes	8
J. Star Racing	Chevrolet Cruze	81	Ricardo Sargo	1–5
J. Star Racing	Chevrolet Cruze	81	Leandro Romera	5–7
J. Star Racing	Chevrolet Cruze	81	Fernando Fortes	6–7
Serra Motosport	Mitisubishi Lancer GT	12	Carlos Padovan	All
Serra Motosport	Mitisubishi Lancer GT	20	Fabio Carbone	3–8
Serra Motosport	Mitisubishi Lancer GT	80	Marcos Gomes	1–2
Bassan Motorsport	Ford Focus	15	Aldo Piedade Jr.	1
Bassan Motorsport	Ford Focus	17	Fernando Galera	1–4
Bassan Motorsport	Ford Focus	27	Wilson Pinheiro	6–7
Bassan Motorsport	Ford Focus	52	Lucilio Baumer	5
Bassan Motorsport	Ford Focus	71	Marcelo Lins	2–8
Carlos Alves Competições	Chevrolet Cruze	21	Thiago Camilo	1–4
Carlos Alves Competições	Chevrolet Cruze	28	Galid Osman	All
Carlos Alves Competições	Chevrolet Cruze	28	Felipe Lapenna	6–8
Carlos Alves Competições	Chevrolet Cruze	57	Vicente Orige	5–8
Officer ProGP	Mitisubishi Lancer GT	33	Felipe Maluhy	All
Officer ProGP	Mitisubishi Lancer GT	72	Fábio Fogaça	All

== Race calendar and results ==
The provisional calendar was announced by the championship organisers on 20 November 2011, with Curitiba to host two races, include a support at the FIA WTCC Race of Brazil. On 25 May 2012, the race at Rio de Janeiro was moved to August. All races were held in Brazil.

Round		Circuit	Date	Pole position	Fastest lap	Winning driver	Winning team
1	R1	Autódromo José Carlos Pace	April 22	Denis Navarro	Denis Navarro	André Bragantini	JLM Racing
1	R2	Autódromo José Carlos Pace	April 22		Juliano Moro	Thiago Camilo	Carlos Alves Competições
2	R1	Autódromo Internacional Nelson Piquet	June 10	Fabio Carbone	Denis Navarro	Fabio Carbone	Full Time Sports
2	R2	Autódromo Internacional Nelson Piquet	June 10		Thiago Marques	Thiago Marques	RZ Motorsport
3	R1	Autódromo Internacional de Curitiba	July 22	André Bragantini	Alceu Feldmann	André Bragantini	JLM Racing
3	R2	Autódromo Internacional de Curitiba	July 22		Alceu Feldmann	Ricardo Zonta	RZ Motorsport
4	R1	Autódromo Internacional Nelson Piquet	August 5	Denis Navarro	Diego Nunes	Denis Navarro	Bassani Racing
4	R2	Autódromo Internacional Nelson Piquet	August 5		Thiago Camilo	Thiago Camilo	Carlos Alves Competições
5	R1	Velopark, Nova Santa Rita	September 23	Ricardo Maurício	Thiago Marques	Thiago Marques	RZ Motorsport
5	R2	Velopark, Nova Santa Rita	September 23		Thiago Marques	Thiago Marques	RZ Motorsport
6	R1	Autódromo Internacional de Tarumã	October 28	Juliano Moro	Gustavo Martins	Felipe Gama	Full Time Sports
6	R2	Autódromo Internacional de Tarumã	October 28		Ricardo Zonta	Ricardo Zonta	RZ Motorsport
7	R1	Autódromo Internacional Ayrton Senna	November 18	André Bragantini	Felipe Gama	André Bragantini	JLM Racing
7	R2	Autódromo Internacional Ayrton Senna	November 18		Diego Nunes	Fábio Fogaça	Officer ProGP
8	R1	Autódromo Internacional de Curitiba	December 2	Felipe Gama	Ricardo Zonta	Ricardo Zonta	RZ Motorsport
8	R2	Autódromo Internacional de Curitiba	December 2		Ricardo Zonta	André Bragantini	JLM Racing

== Championship standings ==
- Points were awarded as follows:

Position	1	2	3	4	5	6	7	8	9	10	11	12	13	14	15
Standard	25	20	16	14	12	10	9	8	7	6	5	4	3	2	1
R15/R16	50	40	32	28	24	20	18	16	14	12	10	8	6	4	2

=== Drivers' Championship ===
Pos	Driver	INT		BRA		CUR		RIO		VEL		TAR		LON		CUR		Pts
1	Ricardo Maurício	3	4	3	3	2	3	3	Ret	**2**	Ret	2	5	3	Ret	2	11	232
2	Ricardo Zonta	Ret	Ret	14	4	8	**1**	Ret	Ret	5	Ret	7	1	5	3	1	2	213
3	Denis Navarro	**2**	9	2	Ret	3	6	**1**	5	6	2	17	9	4	5	4	Ret	201
4	Diego Nunes	6	2	5	Ret	6	16	7	2	11	4	4	3	6	2	9	7	192
5	André Bragantini	1	10†	4	DSQ†	**1**	5†	Ret	8†	Ret†	7	**3**†	15	**1**	Ret	Ret	1	191
6	Felipe Maluhy	Ret	8	10	5	5	2	5	3	Ret	10	6	2	9	11	13	9	154
7	Thiago Marques	Ret	DNS	6	1	Ret	Ret	6	6	1	1	10	DSQ	2	4	Ret	DNS	145
8	Fábio Fogaça	15	7	9	15	Ret	9	8	**Ret**	3	Ret	8	**4**	8	**1**	5	8	144
9	Vítor Meira	4	3	Ret	9	Ret	8	Ret	7	Ret	DNS	9	8	7	6	8	**5**	128
10	Juliano Moro	1†	10	4†	DSQ	**1**†	5	Ret†	8	Ret	7†	**3**	15†					116
11	Thiago Camilo	8	**1**	7	2	4	DSQ	Ret	1									101
11	Felipe Gama											1	6	10	Ret	**3**	4	101
13	Serafin Jr.	9	5	8	**7**	Ret	11	4	14	7	5	13	Ret	Ret	9	Ret	12	96
14	Carlos Padovan	14	12	Ret	11	9	15	10	9	Ret	8	15	Ret	11	10	11	10	74
15	Vicente Orige									9	11	11	10	Ret	7	7	5	70
16	Alceu Feldmann	7	Ret			11	4	2	4									62
17	Fabio Carbone			**1**	14	Ret	10	11	Ret	10	3	16	7	14	Ret	10	Ret	56
18	Claudio Caparelli			Ret	12	10	13	Ret	10	8	**Ret**	19	13	13	8	12	Ret	49
19	Marconi de Abreu	11	6	13	8	Ret	Ret	9	13	Ret	6							46
20	Galid Osman	10	13	12	16	12	7	12	Ret	4	Ret	12†	11	Ret†	DNS	Ret†	DNS	44
21	Marcos Gomes	5	Ret	11	6											15	3	34
22	Fernando Galera	13	11	DSQ	10	7	12	Ret	11									32
23	Marcelo Lins			15	13	Ret	Ret	Ret	12	12	Ret	Ret	16	16	12	14	13	25
24	Pedro Nunes													12	DSQ	6	Ret	24
25	Gustavo Martins											5	Ret†					12
25	Vilson Jr.											5†	Ret					12
26	Felipe Lappena											12	11†	Ret	DNS†	Ret	DNS†	9
27	Wilson Pinheiro											14	12	Ret	13			8
27	Ricardo Sargo	Ret	DNS	16	Ret	13	14	13	Ret	Ret†	Ret							8
29	Lucilio Baumer									Ret	9							7
30	Marcelo Tomasoni	12	Ret															4
31	Leandro Romera									Ret	Ret†	18†	14	15†	Ret			3
31	Fernando Fortes											18	14†	15	Ret†			3
32	Aldo Piedade Jr.	Ret	Ret															0
32	Tiel de Andrade									Ret	Ret							0
Pos	Driver	INT		BRA		CUR		RIO		VEL		TAR		LON		CUR		Pts

Colour	Result
Gold	Winner
Silver	Second place
Bronze	Third place
Green	Points classification
Blue	Non-points classification
Blue	Non-classified finish (NC)
Purple	Retired, not classified (Ret)
Red	Did not qualify (DNQ)
Red	Did not pre-qualify (DNPQ)
Black	Disqualified (DSQ)
White	Did not start (DNS)
White	Withdrew (WD)
White	Race cancelled (C)
Blank	Did not practice (DNP)
Blank	Did not arrive (DNA)
Blank	Excluded (EX)

**Bold** – Pole
Italics – Fastest Lap

Notes:

- † — Driver not racing, but scored points to participate with partner.

=== Manufacturers' Championship ===
Pos	Manufacturer	INT		BRA		CUR		RIO		VEL		TAR		LON		CUR		Pts
1	Toyota	2	2	2	1	3	1	1	2	1	1	4	1	2	2	1	2	559
1	Toyota	6	9	5	4	6	6	6	5	5	2	7	3	4	3	4	4	559
2	Honda	1	4	1	3	1	3	2	4	2	7	1	5	1	Ret	2	1	541
2	Honda	3	6	3	8	2	4	3	8	Ret	6	2	6	3	Ret	3	4	541
3	Mitsubishi	5	7	9	5	5	2	5	3	3	3	6	2	8	1	5	8	338
3	Mitsubishi	14	8	10	6	9	9	8	9	10	8	8	4	9	10	11	9	338
4	Chevrolet	8	1	7	2	4	7	12	1	4	11	11	10	13	7	7	3	286
4	Chevrolet	10	13	12	12	10	13	13	10	8	Ret	12	11	15	8	12	5	286
5	Ford	4	3	9	7	7	8	4	7	7	5	9	8	7	6	8	5	238
5	Ford	9	5	15	9	Ret	11	Ret	11	12	9	13	12	16	9	14	12	238
Pos	Manufacturer	INT		BRA		CUR		RIO		VEL		TAR		LON		CUR		Pts

=== Teams' Championship ===
Pos	Team	INT		BRA		CUR		RIO		VEL		TAR		LON		CUR		Pts
1	Full Time Sports	3	4	1	3	2	3	2	4	2	Ret	1	5	3	Ret	2	4	422
1	Full Time Sports	7	Ret	3	14	4	11	3	Ret	Ret	Ret	2	6	10	Ret	3	11	422
2	Bassani Racing	2	2	2	Ret	3	6	1	2	6	2	4	3	4	2	4	7	383
2	Bassani Racing	6	9	5	Ret	6	16	7	5	11	4	17	9	6	5	9	Ret	383
3	RZ Motorsport	Ret	Ret	6	1	8	1	6	6	1	1	7	1	2	3	1	2	358
3	RZ Motorsport	Ret	DNS	14	4	Ret	Ret	Ret	Ret	5	Ret	10	DSQ	5	4	Ret	DNS	358
4	Officer ProGP	15	7	9	5	5	2	5	3	3	10	6	2	8	1	5	8	291
4	Officer ProGP	Ret	8	10	15	Ret	9	8	Ret	Ret	Ret	9	4	9	11	13	9	291
5	JLM Racing	1	6	4	8	1	5	9	8	Ret	7	3	15	1	Ret	6	1	273
5	JLM Racing	11	10	13	DSQ	Ret	Ret	Ret	13	Ret	6	5	Ret	12	DSQ	Ret	Ret	273
6	Carlos Alves Competições	8	1	7	2	4	7	12	1	4	11	11	10	Ret	7	7	5	220
6	Carlos Alves Competições	10	13	12	16	12	DSQ	Ret	Ret	9	Ret	12	11	Ret	DNS	Ret	DNS	220
7	Amir Nasr Racing	4	3	8	7	Ret	8	4	7	7	5	9	8	7	6	8	5	216
7	Amir Nasr Racing	9	5	Ret	9	Ret	11	Ret	14	Ret	DNS	13	Ret	Ret	9	Ret	10	216
8	Serra Motorsport	5	12	11	6	9	10	10	9	10	3	15	7	11	10	10	10	152
8	Serra Motorsport	14	Ret	Ret	11	Ret	15	11	Ret	Ret	8	16	Ret	14	Ret	11	Ret	152
9	J. Star Racing	12	Ret	16	12	10	13	13	10	8	Ret	18	13	13	8	12	3	98
9	J. Star Racing	Ret	DNS	Ret	Ret	13	14	Ret	Ret	Ret	Ret	19	14	15	Ret	15	Ret	98
10	Bassan Motorsport	13	11	15	10	7	12	Ret	11	12	9	14	12	16	12	14	13	74
10	Bassan Motorsport	Ret	Ret	DSQ	13	Ret	Ret	Ret	12	Ret	Ret	Ret	16	Ret	13			74
Pos	Team	INT		BRA		CUR		RIO		VEL		TAR		LON		CUR		Pts

Colour	Result
Gold	Winner
Silver	Second place
Bronze	Third place
Green	Points classification
Blue	Non-points classification
Blue	Non-classified finish (NC)
Purple	Retired, not classified (Ret)
Red	Did not qualify (DNQ)
Red	Did not pre-qualify (DNPQ)
Black	Disqualified (DSQ)
White	Did not start (DNS)
White	Withdrew (WD)
White	Race cancelled (C)
Blank	Did not practice (DNP)
Blank	Did not arrive (DNA)
Blank	Excluded (EX)
