= 2011 Brasileiro de Marcas =

Car racing competition

Seasons
- ← none 2012 →

The 2011 Brasileiro de Marcas season was the inaugural season of the Brasileiro de Marcas. It began on June 19 at the Tarumã and concluded on December 4 at the Curitiba, after a total of sixteen races.

In its first season, several teams received support from manufacturers. Carlos Alves Competições and AMG Motorsport were backed by Chevrolet, Amir Nasr Racing and Officer ProGP had support from Ford, while Full Time Sports was supported by Honda.

Chevrolet driver Thiago Camilo won the championship after a dramatic final race of the season. Camilo secured a total of six victories throughout the campaign. Honda driver Daniel Serra finished as runner-up, while Fábio Carbone claimed third place. Chevrolet also won the Manufacturers' Championship, finishing 26 points ahead of Honda.

== Teams and drivers ==
All drivers were Brazilian-registered.

Team	Car	No.	Drivers	Rounds
Auto Racing	Honda Civic	0	Wilson Pinheiro	4
Auto Racing	Honda Civic	0	Pierre Ventura	4
Auto Racing	Honda Civic	5	Gustavo Martins	5
Auto Racing	Honda Civic	5	Wilson Pinheiro	7
Auto Racing	Honda Civic	6	Juliano Moro	2–3, 5–7
Auto Racing	Honda Civic	6	Elias Junior	3
Auto Racing	Honda Civic	13	André Bragantini	8
Auto Racing	Honda Civic	18	Allam Khodair	4
Auto Racing	Honda Civic	25	Cristian Mohr	8
Auto Racing	Honda Civic	26	Juliano Moro	1
Auto Racing	Honda Civic	26	Cristiano de Almeida	2–3
Auto Racing	Honda Civic	27	Cristiano de Almeida	1
AMG Motorsport	Chevrolet Astra	1	Thiago Marques	All
AMG Motorsport	Chevrolet Astra	17	Serafin Junior	6
AMG Motorsport	Chevrolet Astra	37	Lorenzo Varassin	7–8
AMG Motorsport	Chevrolet Astra	51	Átila Abreu	1–5
Bassani Racing	Toyota Corolla	2	Rodolpho Santos	5
Bassani Racing	Toyota Corolla	3	Denis Navarro	All
Bassani Racing	Toyota Corolla	9	Giuliano Losacco	7–8
Bassani Racing	Toyota Corolla	16	Bruno Junqueira	6
Bassani Racing	Toyota Corolla	30	Michelle de Jesus	2
Bassani Racing	Toyota Corolla	73	Sérgio Jimenez	1
Bassani Racing	Toyota Corolla	85	Rodrigo Miguel	3–4
Amir Nasr Racing	Ford Focus	4	Cláudio Ricci	4
Amir Nasr Racing	Ford Focus	5	Wilson Pinheiro	1
Amir Nasr Racing	Ford Focus	5	Gustavo Martins	1–4
Amir Nasr Racing	Ford Focus	11	José Cordova	1–2
Amir Nasr Racing	Ford Focus	11	Ulisses Silva	3
Amir Nasr Racing	Ford Focus	45	Antônio Pizzonia	5
Amir Nasr Racing	Ford Focus	47	Claudio Caparelli	6–7
Amir Nasr Racing	Ford Focus	71	Marcelo Lins	6–7
Amir Nasr Racing	Ford Focus	75	Tiago Gonçalves	5
Amir Nasr Racing	Ford Focus	75	Ronaldo Kastropil	5
Bassani Marcas	Toyota Corolla	8	André Massuh	5
Bassani Marcas	Toyota Corolla	13	André Bragantini	7
Bassani Marcas	Toyota Corolla	17	Celso Vianna	3
Bassani Marcas	Toyota Corolla	17	Serafin Junior	3
Bassani Marcas	Toyota Corolla	27	Patrick Gonçalves	8
Bassani Marcas	Toyota Corolla	32	Raphael Abbate	4
Bassani Marcas	Toyota Corolla	33	Felipe Maluhy	8
Bassani Marcas	Toyota Corolla	50	Rodrigo de Paoli	6
Bassani Marcas	Toyota Corolla	75	Henrique Assunção	2
Bassani Marcas	Toyota Corolla	75	Ronaldo Kastropil	2
Bassani Marcas	Toyota Corolla	82	William Freire	1, 3–4, 6–7
Bassani Marcas	Toyota Corolla	85	Rodrigo Miguel	1–2
Bassani Marcas	Toyota Corolla	96	Eduardo Garcia	5
Officer ProGP	Ford Focus	9	Andersom Toso	2–3, 5
Officer ProGP	Ford Focus	72	Andersom Toso	1
Officer ProGP	Ford Focus	72	Fábio Fogaça	1–6, 8
Officer ProGP	Ford Focus	23	Duda Pamplona	6–7
Officer ProGP	Ford Focus	71	Duda Pamplona	1
Officer ProGP	Ford Focus	33	Felipe Maluhy	4
Officer ProGP	Ford Focus	90	Ricardo Maurício	7–8
Full Time Sports	Honda Civic	10	Alceu Feldmann	All
Full Time Sports	Honda Civic	20	Fabio Carbone	All
Serra Motorsport	Honda Civic	12	Carlos Padovan	1, 3–8
Serra Motorsport	Honda Civic	29	Daniel Serra	All
Serra Motorsport	Honda Civic	33	Chico Serra	2
Carlos Alves Competições	Chevrolet Astra	21	Thiago Camilo	All
Carlos Alves Competições	Chevrolet Astra	28	Galid Osman	1–6, 8
Carlos Alves Competições	Chevrolet Astra	44	Júlio Campos	7
Mico's Racing	Chevrolet Astra	22	Felipe Neira	8
Mico's Racing	Chevrolet Astra	63	Lico Kaesemodel	2
Mico's Racing	Chevrolet Astra	66	Matheus Stumpf	4
Mico's Racing	Chevrolet Astra	66	Aluizio Coelho	4
Mico's Racing	Chevrolet Astra	67	Aluizio Coelho	3
Mico's Racing	Chevrolet Astra	76	Wellington Justino	1
Mico's Racing	Chevrolet Astra	77	Valdeno Brito	1–4, 6–8

== Race calendar and results ==
All races were held in Brazil.

Round		Circuit	Date	Pole position	Fastest lap	Winning driver	Winning team
1	R1	Autódromo Internacional de Tarumã	June 19	Valdeno Brito	Valdeno Brito	Valdeno Brito	Mico's Racing
1	R2	Autódromo Internacional de Tarumã	June 19		Átila Abreu	Thiago Camilo	Carlos Alves Competitições
2	R1	Autódromo José Carlos Pace	July 17	Valdeno Brito	Juliano Moro	Valdeno Brito	Mico's Racing
2	R2	Autódromo José Carlos Pace	July 17		Galid Osman	Thiago Camilo	Carlos Alves Competitições
3	R1	Autódromo Internacional Nelson Piquet	July 31	Valdeno Brito	Valdeno Brito	Valdeno Brito	Mico's Racing
3	R2	Autódromo Internacional Nelson Piquet	July 31		Átila Abreu	Valdeno Brito	Mico's Racing
4	R1	Velopark, Nova Santa Rita	August 21	Daniel Serra	Daniel Serra	Daniel Serra	Serra Motorsport
4	R2	Velopark, Nova Santa Rita	August 21		Daniel Serra	Cláudio Ricci	Amir Nasr Racing
5	R1	Autódromo Internacional Nelson Piquet	September 25	Thiago Camilo	Thiago Camilo	Thiago Camilo	Carlos Alves Competitições
5	R2	Autódromo Internacional Nelson Piquet	September 25		Thiago Camilo	Thiago Camilo	Carlos Alves Competitições
6	R1	Autódromo Internacional Nelson Piquet	October 30	Serafin Jr.	Serafin Jr.	Thiago Camilo	Carlos Alves Competitições
6	R2	Autódromo Internacional Nelson Piquet	October 30		Serafin Jr.	Serafin Jr.	AMG Motorsport
7	R1	Autódromo Internacional Ayrton Senna	November 20	Fabio Carbone	Júlio Campos	Valdeno Brito	Mico's Racing
7	R2	Autódromo Internacional Ayrton Senna	November 20		Juliano Moro	Thiago Camilo	Carlos Alves Competitições
8	R1	Autódromo Internacional de Curitiba	December 4	Daniel Serra	Daniel Serra	Daniel Serra	Serra Motorsport
8	R2	Autódromo Internacional de Curitiba	December 4		Ricardo Mauricio	Fabio Carbone	Full Time Sports

== Championship standings ==
- Points were awarded as follows:

Position	1	2	3	4	5	6	7	8	9	10	11	12	13	14	15
Standard	25	20	16	14	12	10	9	8	7	6	5	4	3	2	1
Curitiba	50	40	32	28	24	20	18	16	14	12	10	8	6	4	2

=== Drivers' Championship ===
Pos	Driver	TAR		INT		RIO		VEL		BRA		RIO		LON		CUR		Pts
1	Thiago Camilo	7	1	4	1	6	Ret	6	8	**1**	1	1	3	8	**1**	6	6	257
2	Daniel Serra	2	2	Ret	Ret	3	5	**1**	3	4	3	6	Ret	7	5	**1**	Ret	220
3	Fabio Carbone	5	6	7	Ret	5	7	5	13	9	4	12	12	**3**	4	3	1	205
4	Alceu Feldmann	4	4	6	4	Ret	8	9	6	10	8	9	5	2	7	2	4	201
5	Thiago Marques	3	5	Ret	5	2	4	3	5	Ret	9	2	4	9	11	5	7	197
6	Valdeno Brito	**1**	Ret	**1**	Ret	**1**	1	Ret	10			4	Ret	1	8	Ret	9	167
7	Juliano Moro	11	Ret	2	Ret	7†	3			3	6	5	2	4	Ret			122
8	Fabio Fogaça	DNS	12†	Ret	DNS	Ret	DNS	7	2	6	2	Ret	9			7	5	112
9	Denis Navarro	Ret	DNS	8	**7**	Ret	Ret	10	Ret	15	5	Ret	8	Ret	9	8	**3**	99
10	Galid Osman	10	7	3	2	Ret	DNS	Ret	Ret	7	12	8	**11**			11	12	95
11	Ricardo Mauricio													6	3	4	2	94
12	Átila Abreu	12	Ret	Ret	Ret	4	2	Ret	7	2	DSQ							67
13	Carlos Padovan	13	13			13	10	13	Ret	12	Ret	13	Ret	14	14	13	10	47
14	Rodrigo Miguel	8	**3**	10	Ret	9	9	Ret	15									45
15	William Freire	Ret	Ret			Ret	DNS	4	12			10	6	13	10			43
16	Serafin Jr.					8	**Ret**†					**3**	1					41
17	Allam Khodair							2	4									34
18	Cláudio Ricci							8	**1**									33
19	Júlio Campos													5	2			32
20	Giuliano Losacco													10	6	10	Ret	28
21	José Cordova	6	10	Ret	6													26
22	Elias Junior					7	3†											25
23	Chico Serra			9	3													23
24	Claudio Caparelli											11	7	12	13			21
25	Aluizio Coelho					11	6	12	Ret†									19
26	Patrick Gonçalves															12	11	18
26	Andersom Toso	DNS†	12	13	Ret	12	12			Ret	13							18
28	Antônio Pizzonia									8	**7**							17
29	Eduardo Garcia									5	15							13
30	Cristiano de Almeida	Ret	Ret	12	Ret	14	11											11
31	Wellington Justino	14	8															10
31	Rodolpho Santos									11	11							10
33	Bruno Junqueira											7	Ret					9
33	Ronaldo Kastropil			11	Ret†					13	10†							9
33	Tiago Gonçalves									13†	10							9
33	Lorenzo Varassin													11	12	14	DSQ	9
37	Celso Vianna					8†	**Ret**											8
38	Sérgio Jimenez	Ret	9															7
38	Felipe Maluhy							Ret	9							9	DSQ	7
40	Ulisses Silva					10	Ret											6
40	Marcelo Lins											Ret	10	16	16			6
42	Raphael Abbate							11	16									5
42	Henrique Assunção			11†	Ret													5
44	Gustavo Martins	9	11†	5	8†	Ret	Ret	Ret	11	14	14							4
44	Wilson Pinheiro	9†	11					Ret	14†					15	15			4
44	Matheus Stumpf							12†	Ret									4
47	Pierre Ventura							Ret†	14									2
48	Duda Pamplona	Ret	DNS									Ret	DNS	Ret	Ret			0
48	Lico Kaesemodel			Ret	Ret													0
48	Rodrigo de Paoli											Ret	Ret					0
48	Michelle de Jesus			Ret	DNS													0
Drivers ineligible for championship points
	André Bragantini													DNS	DNS	Ret	8	0
	Cristian Mohr															Ret	13	0
	Felipe Neira															15	DNS	0
	André Massuh									DNS	Ret							0
Pos	Driver	TAR		INT		RIO		VEL		BRA		RIO		LON		CUR		Pts

Colour	Result
Gold	Winner
Silver	Second place
Bronze	Third place
Green	Points classification
Blue	Non-points classification
Blue	Non-classified finish (NC)
Purple	Retired, not classified (Ret)
Red	Did not qualify (DNQ)
Red	Did not pre-qualify (DNPQ)
Black	Disqualified (DSQ)
White	Did not start (DNS)
White	Withdrew (WD)
White	Race cancelled (C)
Blank	Did not practice (DNP)
Blank	Did not arrive (DNA)
Blank	Excluded (EX)

**Bold** – Pole
Italics – Fastest Lap

Notes:

- † — Driver not racing, but scored points by compete with partner.

=== Manufacturers' Championship ===
Pos	Manufacturer	TAR		INT		RIO		VEL		BRA		RIO		LON		CUR		Pts
1	Chevrolet	1	1	1	1	1	1	3	5	1	1	1	1	1	1	5	6	581
1	Chevrolet	3	5	3	2	2	2	6	7	2	9	2	3	5	2	6	7	581
2	Honda	2	2	2	3	3	3	1	3	3	3	5	2	2	4	1	1	555
2	Honda	4	4	6	4	5	5	2	4	4	4	6	5	3	5	2	4	555
3	Ford	6	10	5	6	10	12	7	1	6	2	11	7	6	3	4	2	339
3	Ford	9	11	13	8	12	Ret	8	2	8	7	Ret	9	12	13	7	6	339
Pos	Manufacturer	TAR		INT		RIO		VEL		BRA		RIO		LON		CUR		Pts

=== Teams' Championship ===
Pos	Team	TAR		INT		RIO		VEL		BRA		RIO		LON		CUR		Pts
1	Full Time Sports	4	4	6	4	5	7	5	6	9	4	9	5	2	4	2	1	392
1	Full Time Sports	5	6	7	Ret	Ret	8	9	13	10	8	12	12	3	7	3	4	392
2	Carlos Alves Competições	7	1	3	1	7	DNS	6	8	1	1	1	3	5	1	6	6	384
2	Carlos Alves Competições	10	7	4	2	Ret	DNS	Ret	Ret	7	10	8	11	8	2	11	12	384
2	AMG Motorsport	3	5	Ret	5	2	2	3	5	2	9	2	1	9	11	5	7	307
2	AMG Motorsport	12	Ret	Ret	Ret	4	4	Ret	7	Ret	DSQ	3	4	11	12	14	DSQ	307
4	Serra Motorsport	2	2	9	3	3	5	1	3	4	3	6	Ret	7	5	1	10	283
4	Serra Motorsport	13	13	Ret	Ret	13	10	13	Ret	12	Ret	13	Ret	14	14	13	Ret	283
5	Officer ProGP	Ret	12	13	Ret	12	12	7	2	6	2	Ret	9	6	3	4	2	227
5	Officer ProGP	DNS	DNS	Ret	DNS	Ret	DNS	Ret	9	Ret	13	Ret	DNS	Ret	Ret	7	5	227
6	Mico's Racing	1	8	1	Ret	1	1	12	10			4	Ret	1	8	15	9	198
6	Mico's Racing	14	Ret	Ret	Ret	11	6	Ret	Ret							Ret	DNS	198
7	Auto Racing	11	Ret	2	12	7	3	2	4	3	6	5	2	4	15	Ret	8	197
7	Auto Racing	Ret	Ret	Ret	Ret	14	11	Ret	14	14	14			15	Ret	Ret	13	197
8	Bassani Racing	Ret	9	8	7	9	9	10	15	11	5	7	8	10	6	8	3	167
8	Bassani Racing	Ret	DNS	Ret	DNS	Ret	Ret	Ret	Ret	15	11	Ret	Ret	Ret	9	10	Ret	167
9	Amir Nasr Racing	6	10	5	6	10	Ret	8	1	8	7	11	7	12	13			155
9	Amir Nasr Racing	9	11	Ret	8	Ret	Ret	Ret	11	13	10	Ret	10	16	16			155
10	Bassani Marcas	8	3	10	Ret	8	Ret	4	12	5	15	10	6	13	10	9	11	136
10	Bassani Marcas	Ret	Ret	11	Ret	Ret	DNS	11	16	Ret	DNS	Ret	Ret	DNS	DNS	12	DSQ	136
Pos	Team	TAR		INT		RIO		VEL		BRA		RIO		LON		CUR		Pts

Colour	Result
Gold	Winner
Silver	Second place
Bronze	Third place
Green	Points classification
Blue	Non-points classification
Blue	Non-classified finish (NC)
Purple	Retired, not classified (Ret)
Red	Did not qualify (DNQ)
Red	Did not pre-qualify (DNPQ)
Black	Disqualified (DSQ)
White	Did not start (DNS)
White	Withdrew (WD)
White	Race cancelled (C)
Blank	Did not practice (DNP)
Blank	Did not arrive (DNA)
Blank	Excluded (EX)
