= 2011 Stock Car Brasil season =

Car racing competition

Seasons
- ← 2010 2012 →

The 2011 Copa Caixa Stock Car season was the 33rd Stock Car Brasil season. It began on March 20 at the Curitiba and ended on November 6 at the Velopark, after twelve rounds. For this season, the Manufacturer Peugeot announced that the 408 was to be the new representative in the championship replacing the 307.

Cacá Bueno won the Drivers' Championship by thirteen points from Ricardo Mauricio, with his brother Popó Bueno finishing in third eighteen behind Cacá.

== Teams and drivers ==
All drivers were Brazilian-registered, excepting Jacques Villeneuve, who raced under Canadian racing license.

Manufacturer	Team	No.	Driver	Rounds
Peugeot 408	Red Bull Racing	0	Cacá Bueno	All
Peugeot 408	Red Bull Racing	29	Daniel Serra	All
Peugeot 408	Scuderia 111	1	Antônio Pizzonia	7
Peugeot 408	Scuderia 111	2	Alan Hellmeister	1–7
Peugeot 408	Scuderia 111	4	Júlio Campos	1–6
Peugeot 408	Scuderia 111	20	Ricardo Sperafico	8–10
Peugeot 408	Scuderia 111	41	Diego Freitas	8
Peugeot 408	Scuderia 111	73	Sérgio Jimenez	9
Peugeot 408	Scuderia 111	89	Matheus Stumpf	10, 12
Peugeot 408	Amir Nasr Racing	1	Antônio Pizzonia	3
Peugeot 408	Amir Nasr Racing	20	Ricardo Sperafico	6–7
Peugeot 408	Amir Nasr Racing	31	Willian Starostik	1–2
Peugeot 408	Amir Nasr Racing	53	Alberto Valério	1–3
Peugeot 408	Amir Nasr Racing	70	Tarso Marques	7
Peugeot 408	Amir Nasr Racing	89	Matheus Stumpf	6
Peugeot 408	RC3 Bassani	5	Denis Navarro	All
Peugeot 408	RC3 Bassani	12	Bruno Junqueira	11–12
Peugeot 408	RC3 Bassani	16	Diego Nunes	1–9
Peugeot 408	Itaipava Racing Team	14	Luciano Burti	All
Peugeot 408	Itaipava Racing Team	35	David Muffato	All
Peugeot 408	JF Racing	19	Rodrigo Sperafico	All
Peugeot 408	JF Racing	22	Rodrigo Navarro	All
Peugeot 408	Shell V-Power Racing	27	Jacques Villeneuve	7
Peugeot 408	Medley Full Time	80	Marcos Gomes	All
Peugeot 408	Medley Full Time	99	Xandinho Negrão	All
Chevrolet Vectra	Crystal Racing Team	3	Cláudio Ricci	1–4
Chevrolet Vectra	Crystal Racing Team	4	Júlio Campos	7–12
Chevrolet Vectra	Crystal Racing Team	10	Ricardo Zonta	All
Chevrolet Vectra	Crystal Racing Team	73	Sérgio Jimenez	5–6
Chevrolet Vectra	AMG Motorsport	8	Serafin Jr.	5–12
Chevrolet Vectra	AMG Motorsport	20	Ricardo Sperafico	4
Chevrolet Vectra	AMG Motorsport	26	Antonio Jorge Neto	3
Chevrolet Vectra	AMG Motorsport	51	Átila Abreu	All
Chevrolet Vectra	Bardahl Hot Car	9	Giuliano Losacco	All
Chevrolet Vectra	Bardahl Hot Car	37	Eduardo Leite	All
Chevrolet Vectra	Esso Mobil Super Racing	11	Nonô Figueiredo	All
Chevrolet Vectra	Esso Mobil Super Racing	77	Valdeno Brito	All
Chevrolet Vectra	Vogel Motorsport	18	Allam Khodair	All
Chevrolet Vectra	Vogel Motorsport	25	Tuka Rocha	All
Chevrolet Vectra	RCM Motorsport	21	Thiago Camilo	All
Chevrolet Vectra	RCM Motorsport	63	Lico Kaesemodel	All
Chevrolet Vectra	Officer ProGP	23	Duda Pamplona	All
Chevrolet Vectra	Officer ProGP	33	Felipe Maluhy	All
Chevrolet Vectra	Eurofarma RC	65	Max Wilson	All
Chevrolet Vectra	Eurofarma RC	90	Ricardo Maurício	All
Chevrolet Vectra	A.Mattheis Motorsport	74	Popó Bueno	All
Chevrolet Vectra	A.Mattheis Motorsport	100	Alceu Feldmann	All

== Race calendar and results ==
All races were held in Brazil.

Round	Circuit	Date	Pole position	Fastest lap	Winning driver	Winning team
1	Autódromo Internacional de Curitiba	March 20	Marcos Gomes	Ricardo Zonta	Thiago Camilo	RCM Motorsport
2	Interlagos Circuit	April 4	Ricardo Maurício	Ricardo Maurício	Cacá Bueno	Red Bull Racing
3	Ribeirão Preto Street Circuit	April 17	Luciano Burti	Antônio Pizzonia	Átila Abreu	AMG Motorsport
4	Velopark, Nova Santa Rita	May 15	Cacá Bueno	Thiago Camilo	Átila Abreu	AMG Motorsport
5	Autódromo Internacional Orlando Moura	June 5	Allam Khodair	Luciano Burti	Luciano Burti	Itaipava Racing Team
6	Autódromo Internacional Nelson Piquet, Rio de Janeiro	July 3	Cacá Bueno	Cacá Bueno	Cacá Bueno	Red Bull Racing
7	Interlagos Circuit	August 7	Marcos Gomes	Thiago Camilo	Thiago Camilo	RCM Motorsport
8	Circuito Ayrton Senna, Salvador	September 4	Ricardo Sperafico	Ricardo Zonta	Thiago Camilo	RCM Motorsport
Mobil Super Final
9	Autódromo Internacional de Santa Cruz do Sul	September 18	Cacá Bueno	Daniel Serra	Alceu Feldmann	A.Mattheis Motorsport
10	Autódromo Internacional Ayrton Senna, Londrina	October 2	Cacá Bueno	Cacá Bueno	Cacá Bueno	Red Bull Racing
11	Autódromo Internacional Nelson Piquet, Brasília	October 16	Cacá Bueno	Valdeno Brito	Valdeno Brito	Esso Mobil Super Racing
12	Velopark, Nova Santa Rita	November 6	Cacá Bueno	Cacá Bueno	Daniel Serra	Red Bull Racing

== Championship standings ==
- Points were awarded as follows:

Pos	1	2	3	4	5	6	7	8	9	10	11	12	13	14	15
Race	25	20	16	14	12	10	9	8	7	6	5	4	3	2	1

=== Drivers' Championship ===
Pos	Driver	CUR	INT1	RBP	VEL1	CAM	RIO	INT2	SAL	SCS	LON	BRA	VEL2	Drop	Points
1	Cacá Bueno	11	1	3	**7**	13	**1**	22	11	**3**	**1**	**3**	**11**	5	271
2	Ricardo Maurício	Ret	**3**	5	3	6	8	8	16	4	2	5	23		258
3	Popó Bueno	6	10	10	8	7	2	7	22	7	4	24	2		253
4	Max Wilson	2	5	2	Ret	9	5	3	2	5	3	16	17		248
5	Daniel Serra	15	2	Ret	19	15	11	2	15	Ret	8	22	1		240
5	Allam Khodair	23	Ret	4	Ret	**2**	6	14	14	19	6	2	12		240
7	Marcos Gomes	**14**	Ret	6	5	3	4	**11**	Ret	2	9	6	8	7	234
8	Thiago Camilo	1	4	8	2	4	3	1	1	Ret	Ret	18	9		232
9	Luciano Burti	5	12	**Ret**	Ret	1	20	Ret	4	10	7	13	16		226
10	Átila Abreu	4	9	1	1	Ret	23	5	3	Ret	DSQ	23	13		219
Mobil Super Final cutoff
11	David Muffato	8	6	20	12	Ret	16	12	6	Ret	11	8	3		65
11	Felipe Maluhy	12	11	11	4	5	Ret	Ret	17	9	22	7	4		65
13	Duda Pamplona	9	7	14	6	11	7	Ret	8	13	Ret	19	5	2	63
14	Valdeno Brito	Ret	13	15	Ret	8	13	19	12	6	DSQ	1	Ret		54
15	Ricardo Zonta	3	8	Ret	11	16	22	15	7	21	5	20	25		51
16	Giuliano Losacco	10	Ret	12	10	12	21	Ret	10	Ret	13	4	10		49
17	Nonô Figueiredo	Ret	23	Ret	Ret	21	24	4	9	8	10	Ret	14		29
18	Xandinho Negrão	Ret	Ret	7	18	10	Ret	6	21	16	23	DSQ	19		25
19	Tuka Rocha	21	22	23	17	19	Ret	Ret	5	20	12	9	20		23
19	Eduardo Leite	13	19	13	Ret	17	17	13	Ret	17	17	12	6		23
21	Rodrigo Sperafico	16	24	22	Ret	Ret	14	17	18	15	14	10	7	1	19
22	Júlio Campos	7	14	9	DSQ	Ret	Ret	9	Ret	14	15	11	15	1	15
23	Diego Nunes	18	18	18	9	23	10	Ret	Ret	Ret					13
24	Lico Kaesemodel	Ret	15	16	Ret	18	9	Ret	DNS	12	21	21	24		12
25	Ricardo Sperafico				Ret		12	16	**20**	11	19				9
26	Alceu Feldmann	19	21	Ret	Ret	14	15	Ret	13	1	16	17	21		6
26	Antônio Pizzonia			Ret				10							6
28	Cláudio Ricci	17	Ret	17	13										3
29	Alan Hellmeister	Ret	Ret	19	14	24	19	21							2
29	Bruno Junqueira											14	22		2
29	Denis Navarro	20	20	Ret	15	Ret	Ret	20	Ret	23	20	15	Ret		2
32	Rodrigo Navarro	22	Ret	21	16	20	Ret	Ret	Ret	18	Ret	Ret	Ret		0
32	Alberto Valério	Ret	16	Ret											0
32	Willian Starostik	24	17												0
32	Sérgio Jimenez					22	18			22					0
32	Diego Freitas								19						0
32	Serafin Jr.					Ret	Ret	Ret	Ret	Ret	Ret	Ret	Ret		0
Drivers ineligible to score points
	Matheus Stumpf						DNS				18		18		0
	Jacques Villeneuve							18							0
	Antônio Jorge Neto			Ret											0
	Tarso Marques							Ret							0
Pos	Driver	CUR	INT	RBP	VEL	CAM	RIO	INT	SAL	SCS	LON	BRA	VEL	Drop	Points

Colour	Result
Gold	Winner
Silver	Second place
Bronze	Third place
Green	Points classification
Blue	Non-points classification
Blue	Non-classified finish (NC)
Purple	Retired, not classified (Ret)
Red	Did not qualify (DNQ)
Red	Did not pre-qualify (DNPQ)
Black	Disqualified (DSQ)
White	Did not start (DNS)
White	Withdrew (WD)
White	Race cancelled (C)
Blank	Did not practice (DNP)
Blank	Did not arrive (DNA)
Blank	Excluded (EX)

**Bold** – Pole
Italics – Fastest Lap

=== Teams' Championship ===
Pos	Team	CUR	INT	RBP	VEL	CAM	RIO	INT	SAL	SCS	LON	BRA	VEL	Pen	Points
1	Eurofarma RC	2	3	2	3	6	5	3	2	4	2	5	17		251
1	Eurofarma RC	Ret	5	5	Ret	9	8	8	16	5	3	16	23		251
2	Red Bull Racing	11	1	3	7	13	1	2	11	3	1	3	1		231
2	Red Bull Racing	15	2	Ret	19	15	11	22	15	Ret	8	22	11		231
3	RCM Motorsport	1	4	8	2	4	3	1	1	12	21	18	9		166
3	RCM Motorsport	Ret	15	16	Ret	18	9	Ret	DNS	Ret	Ret	21	24		166
4	Itaipava Racing Team	5	6	20	12	1	16	12	4	10	7	8	3		138
4	Itaipava Racing Team	8	12	Ret	Ret	Ret	20	Ret	6	Ret	11	13	16		138
5	Officer ProGP	9	7	11	4	5	7	Ret	8	9	22	7	4		135
5	Officer ProGP	12	11	14	6	11	Ret	Ret	17	13	Ret	19	5		135
6	A.Matheis Motorsport	6	10	10	8	7	2	7	13	1	4	17	2	25	117
6	A.Matheis Motorsport	19	21	Ret	Ret	14	15	Ret	22	7	16	24	21	25	117
7	Medley Full Time	14	Ret	6	5	3	4	6	21	2	9	6	8	20	109
7	Medley Full Time	Ret	Ret	7	18	10	Ret	11	Ret	16	23	DSQ	19	20	109
8	Vogel Motorsport	21	22	4	17	2	6	14	5	19	6	2	12		105
8	Vogel Motorsport	23	Ret	23	Ret	19	Ret	Ret	14	20	12	9	20		105
9	AMG Motorsport	4	9	1	1	Ret	23	5	3	Ret	Ret	23	13		102
9	AMG Motorsport			Ret	Ret	Ret	Ret	Ret	Ret	Ret	DSQ	Ret	Ret		102
10	Esso Mobil Super Racing	Ret	13	15	Ret	8	13	4	9	6	10	1	14	8	83
10	Esso Mobil Super Racing	Ret	23	Ret	Ret	21	24	19	12	8	DSQ	Ret	Ret	8	83
11	Hot Car Competições	10	19	12	10	12	17	13	10	17	13	4	6		72
11	Hot Car Competições	13	Ret	13	Ret	17	21	Ret	Ret	Ret	17	12	10		72
12	Crystal Racing Team	3	8	17	11	16	18	9	7	14	5	11	15		70
12	Crystal Racing Team	17	Ret	Ret	13	22	22	15	Ret	21	15	20	25		70
13	Scuderia 111	7	14	9	14	24	19	10	19	11	18		18		31
13	Scuderia 111	Ret	Ret	19	DSQ	Ret	Ret	21	20	22	19				31
14	JF Racing	16	24	21	16	20	14	17	18	15	14	10	7		20
14	JF Racing	22	Ret	22	Ret	Ret	Ret	Ret	Ret	18	Ret	Ret	Ret		20
15	Bassani Racing	18	18	18	9	23	10	20	Ret	23	20	14	22		17
15	Bassani Racing	20	20	Ret	15	Ret	Ret	Ret	Ret	Ret		15	Ret		17
16	Amir Nasr Racing	24	16	Ret			12	16							4
16	Amir Nasr Racing	Ret	17	Ret			DNS	Ret							4
Team ineligible to score points
	Shell V-Power Racing												18	0	
Pos	Team	CUR	INT	RBP	VEL	CAM	RIO	INT	SAL	SCS	LON	BRA	VEL	Pen	Points

Colour	Result
Gold	Winner
Silver	Second place
Bronze	Third place
Green	Points classification
Blue	Non-points classification
Blue	Non-classified finish (NC)
Purple	Retired, not classified (Ret)
Red	Did not qualify (DNQ)
Red	Did not pre-qualify (DNPQ)
Black	Disqualified (DSQ)
White	Did not start (DNS)
White	Withdrew (WD)
White	Race cancelled (C)
Blank	Did not practice (DNP)
Blank	Did not arrive (DNA)
Blank	Excluded (EX)
