= Denis Navarro =

Brazilian auto racing driver (born 1987)

- Nationality: (Brazil) Brazilian
- Born: March 16, 1987 (age 39) São Paulo (Brazil)

Denis Navarro (born March 16, 1987, in São Paulo) is a Brazilian auto racing driver. He currently drives in the Stock Car Brasil.

== Racing record ==
=== Career summary ===
| Season | Series | Team | Races | Wins | Poles | F.Laps | Podiums | Points | Position |
|---|---|---|---|---|---|---|---|---|---|
| 2006 | Formula São Paulo | Alpie | 4 | 0 | 0 | 0 | 0 | 12 | 13th |
| 2006 | Formula Renault 2.0 Brazil | Frisos Inter Job | 2 | 0 | 0 | 0 | 0 | N/A | N/A |
| 2007 | Formula 3 Sudamericana | Bassani Racing | 14 | 0 | 0 | 0 | 1 | 18 | 12th |
| 2008 | Formula 3 Sudamericana | Cesário Fórmula Júnior | 17 | 4 | 6 | 4 | 11 | 105 | 3rd |
| 2009 | Star Mazda Championship | Andersen Racing | 13 | 0 | 0 | 0 | 0 | 321 | 11th |
| 2010 | Copa Chevrolet Montana | RC3 Bassani Racing | 9 | 0 | 0 | 0 | 0 | 29 | 17th |
| 2011 | Stock Car Brasil | Bassani Racing | 12 | 0 | 0 | 0 | 0 | 2 | 29th |
| 2011 | Brasileiro de Marcas | Bassani Racing | 15 | 0 | 0 | 0 | 1 | 99 | 9th |
| 2011 | Formula 3 Sudamericana | Cesário Fórmula | 3 | 0 | 0 | 0 | 0 | 18 | 9th |
| 2012 | Stock Car Brasil | Vogel Motorsport | 12 | 0 | 0 | 0 | 0 | 104 | 12th |
| 2012 | Brasileiro de Marcas | Bassani Racing | 16 | 1 | 2 | 2 | 5 | 201 | 3rd |
| 2013 | Stock Car Brasil | Voxx Racing | 11 | 0 | 0 | 0 | 0 | 63 | 20th |
| 2013 | Brasileiro de Marcas | Toyota Bassani | 16 | 2 | 2 | 4 | 5 | 232 | 2nd |
| 2014 | Stock Car Brasil | Voxx Racing | 21 | 0 | 0 | 0 | 0 | 62 | 25th |
| 2014 | Brasileiro de Marcas | Toyota Bassani | 15 | 1 | 1 | 1 | 5 | 171 | 9th |
| 2014 | Fórmula 3 Brasil - Class B | Chenin Racing | 1 | 0 | 0 | 0 | 0 | N/A | N/A |
| 2015 | Stock Car Brasil | Vogel Motorsport | 21 | 0 | 0 | 0 | 0 | 79 | 21st |
| 2016 | Stock Car Brasil | Vogel Motorsport | 21 | 0 | 0 | 0 | 0 | 114 | 18th |
| 2017 | Stock Car Brasil | Cimed Racing | 22 | 0 | 0 | 0 | 0 | 68 | 23rd |
| 2017 | Porsche Endurance Series | N/A | 1 | 0 | 0 | 0 | 0 | 0 | 29th |
| 2018 | Stock Car Brasil | Cavaleiro Sports | 21 | 0 | 0 | 0 | 0 | 23 | 23rd |
| 2019 | Stock Car Brasil | Cavaleiro Sports | 21 | 0 | 0 | 1 | 1 | 110 | 21st |
| 2020 | Stock Car Brasil | Cavaleiro Sports | 18 | 0 | 0 | 2 | 3 | 134 | 16th |
| 2021 | Stock Car Pro Series | Cavaleiro Sports | 24 | 0 | 0 | 0 | 1 | 206 | 12th |
| 2022 | Stock Car Pro Series | Cavaleiro Sports | 1 | 0 | 0 | 0 | 0 | 0 | N/A* |

=== Complete Stock Car Brasil results ===
| Year | Team | Car | 1 | 2 | 3 | 4 | 5 | 6 | 7 | 8 | 9 | 10 | 11 | 12 | 13 | 14 | 15 | 16 | 17 | 18 | 19 | 20 | 21 | Rank | Points |
|---|---|---|---|---|---|---|---|---|---|---|---|---|---|---|---|---|---|---|---|---|---|---|---|---|---|
| 2011 | RC3 Bassani | Peugeot 408 | CTB; 20 | INT; 20 | RBP; Ret | VEL; 15 | CGD; Ret | RIO; Ret | INT; 20 | SAL; Ret | SCZ; 23 | LON; 20 | BSB; 15 | VEL; Ret | | | | | | | | | | 29th | 2 |
| 2012 | Vogel Motorsport | Chevrolet Sonic | INT; 15 | CTB; 24 | VEL; 7 | RBP; 7 | LON; 18 | RIO; 7 | SAL; 23 | CAS; Ret | TAR; 8 | CTB; 14 | BSB; 16 | INT; 7 | | | | | | | | | | 12th | 104 |
| 2013 | Voxx Racing | Peugeot 408 | INT; 26 | CUR; 13 | TAR; 27 | SAL; Ret | BRA; 12 | CAS; DNS | RBP; 11 | CAS; 14 | VEL; 14 | CUR; 13 | BRA; Ret | INT; 14 | | | | | | | | | | 20th | 63 |
| 2014 | Voxx Racing | Peugeot 408 | INT; 1 | SCZ; 1 | SCZ; 2 | BRA; 1 | BRA; 2 | GOI; 1 | GOI; 2 | GOI; 1 | CAS; 1 | CAS; 2 | CUR; 1 | CUR; 2 | VEL; 1 | VEL; 2 | SAL; 1 | SAL; 2 | TAR; 1 | TAR; 2 | RBP; 1 | RBP; 2 | CUR; 1 | NC | N/A |
