= 2017 Stock Car Brasil Championship =

Car racing competition

The 2017 Stock Car Brasil Championship is the thirty-ninth season of the Stock Car Brasil. The season marks the exit of Peugeot. The manufacturer entered in the series in 2007 and won the championship five times, including the last two seasons.

== Teams and drivers ==
Peugeot retired as manufacturer for the 2017. Therefore, all teams compete with a Chevrolet Cruze Stock Car.

Team	No.	Driver	Rounds
Cimed Racing	0	(Brazil) Cacá Bueno	All
Cimed Racing	40	(Brazil) Felipe Fraga	5–12
Cimed Racing	88	(Brazil) Felipe Fraga	1–4
Prati-Donaduzzi	1	(Brazil) Antonio Pizzonia	All
Prati-Donaduzzi	4	(Brazil) Júlio Campos	All
Full Time Academy	3	(Brazil) Bia Figueiredo	All
Full Time Academy	12	(Brazil) Lucas Foresti	All
Cimed-ProGP	5	(Brazil) Denis Navarro	All
Cimed-ProGP	80	(Brazil) Marcos Gomes	All
Cavaleiro Sports	8	(Brazil) Rafael Suzuki	All
Cavaleiro Sports	110	(Brazil) Felipe Lapenna	All
Bardahl Hot Car	9	(Brazil) Gustavo Lima	All
Bardahl Hot Car	73	(Brazil) Sérgio Jimenez	All
Shell V-Power	10	(Brazil) Ricardo Zonta	All
Shell V-Power	51	(Brazil) Átila Abreu	All
Full Time Sports	18	(Brazil) Allam Khodair	All
Full Time Sports	111	(Brazil) Rubens Barrichello	All
Ipiranga Racing	21	(Brazil) Thiago Camilo	All
Ipiranga Racing	28	(Brazil) Galid Osman	All
RCM Motorsport	25	(Brazil) Tuka Rocha	All
RCM Motorsport	65	(Brazil) Max Wilson	All
Eurofarma RC	29	(Brazil) Daniel Serra	All
Eurofarma RC	90	(Brazil) Ricardo Maurício	All
Blau Motorsport	30	(Brazil) César Ramos	All
Blau Motorsport	31	(Brazil) Márcio Campos	All
HERO Motorsport	44	(Brazil) Alberto Valério	1–10
HERO Motorsport	70	(Brazil) Diego Nunes	1–11
HERO Motorsport	87	(Brazil) Diego Nunes	12
HERO Motorsport	444	(Portugal) António Félix da Costa	11
HERO Motorsport	544	(Brazil) Augusto Farfus	12
Eisenbahn Racing Team	46	(Brazil) Vitor Genz	All
Eisenbahn Racing Team	77	(Brazil) Valdeno Brito	All
Vogel Motorsport	83	(Brazil) Gabriel Casagrande	All
Vogel Motorsport	117	(Brazil) Guilherme Salas	All
Mico's Racing	188	(Brazil) Beto Monteiro	5, 7, 11–12
Mico's Racing	555	(Brazil) Renato Braga	11–12

=== Team changes ===
- A. Mattheis Motorsport, which had raced under the Red Bull sponsorship and name, will now be sponsored by Ipiranga, which left RCM after five seasons.
- After five seasons, RX and Shell Racing parted, with R.Mattheis Motorsport receiving the name and sponsor of Prati-Donaduzzi, that did not compete in 2016 and Shell Racing still in the series after concretized a partnership with TMG Motorsport.
- After only one season, ProGP and Full Time broke up. Duda Pamplona owner of ProGP started a partnership with remaining team's two times champion Cimed Racing. The team is called Cimed Racing Team, a customer team of Cimed Racing. Full Time Sports started a partnership with Bassani Racing (União Quimica Bassani in 2015 and 2016) creating Full Time Bassani (HERO Motorsport for sponsor). FTS also created a new team called Full Time Academy, a junior team of Full Time Sports expanding to six cars. Having sold his cars to FTS, RZ Motorsport of Ricardo Zonta will not return in 2017, after a difficult season in 2016.
- Blau pharmacy entered the series after purchasing the cars of Boettger Competições that did not compete in 2016 and created a new team called Blau Motorsport.
- C2 Team and Mico's Racing left the series this season.

=== Driver changes ===
- Átila Abreu and Ricardo Zonta switched from RX Mattheis-Shell Racing to TMG-Shell Racing. Abreu returned from the team that he competed between 2009 and 2014.
- Cacá Bueno and Daniel Serra left Red Bull Racing-A.Mattheis. Bueno joined remaining two times champion Cimed Racing and Serra after ten seasons with Red Bull joined Eurofarma RC.
- Thiago Camilo and Galid Osman left Ipiranga-RCM to join Ipiranga-A.Mattheis.
- Max Wilson was relocated to RCM, the customer team of Eurofarma RC.
- Júlio Campos will race for RX Mattheis-Prati-Donaduzzi after one year in your own team C2. Antonio Pizzonia returned as a partner of Campos after competing in first round in 2016 as wildcard.
- Felipe Lappena switched from Bardahl Hot Car to Cavaleiro Racing. Rafael Suzuki will be your partner after moves from Vogel Motorsport
- Valdeno Brito and Gustavo Lima left TMG Motorsport. Brito will race for Eisenbahn Racing Team and Lima to Bardahl Hot Car.
- Tuka Rocha raced part-time in 2016 at TMG Motorsport and RZ Motorsport, in 2017 he will race to RCM.
- Gabriel Casagrande switched from C2 Team to Vogel Motorsport. Guilherme Salas will be the partner of Casagrande after left RZ Motorsport.
- Felipe Fraga, who won the 2016 championship was relocated to Cimed Racing Team, the satellite team of Cimed Racing. Denis Navarro, who raced for Vogel Motorsport in 2016, will be your partner.
- Sérgio Jimenez left Cavaleiro Racing to join Bardahl Hot Car.
- Bia Figueiredo left União Química Bassani to join the Full Time Academy. Lucas Foresti will be your partner. Foresti still in FTS program, but, now in the junior team.
- Alberto Valério returned for the series after six seasons and joined Full Time Bassani.
- César Ramos left RZ Motorsport and will race for Blau Motorsport in 2017. Two times Stock Car Brasil second-tier champion, Márcio Campos will be Ramos partner.
- Nestor Girolami will not return to 2016. He will focus on Polestar Cyan Racing at World Touring Car Championship. Thiago Marques, Luciano Burti, Danilo Dirani, Felipe Guimarães, Raphael Abbate, Alceu Feldmann, Fábio Carbone, Beto Cavaleiro, Popó Bueno and Xandinho Negrão also will not return for the season.

=== Mid-season changes ===
- Mico's Racing returned for the series at 9ª Corrida do Milhão Pirelli with Fórmula Truck driver Beto Monteiro. Renato Braga debut in the series at Goiânia.
- Felipe Fraga changed his number at 9ª Corrida do Milhão Pirelli, from 88 to 40. Diego Nunes, also changed his number in the last round from 70 to 88.
- Portuguese driver António Félix da Costa replaced Alberto Valério at 11° round. In the last round Augusto Farfus raced.

== Race calendar and results ==
The 2017 schedule was announced on 20 December 2016. On March 20, 2017, the calendar was revised with the return of Cascavel and the announcement that the first race would not be held with wildcard drivers. All races take place in Brazil except one round at Autódromo Juan y Óscar Gálvez in Argentina next to the Super TC2000 Argentina in the 200 km stage of Buenos Aires. For the first time, the Corrida do Milhão took place at Autódromo Internacional de Curitiba sponsored by Pirelli, the sponsor of the whole series.

Round		Circuit	Date	Pole position	Fastest lap	Winning driver	Winning team
1	R1	Autódromo Internacional Ayrton Senna (Goiânia)	April 2	(Brazil) Daniel Serra	(Brazil) Daniel Serra	(Brazil) Daniel Serra	Eurofarma RC
1	R2	Autódromo Internacional Ayrton Senna (Goiânia)	April 2		(Brazil) Ricardo Zonta	(Brazil) Ricardo Zonta	Shell Racing
2	R1	Velopark, Nova Santa Rita	April 23	(Brazil) Thiago Camilo	(Brazil) Cacá Bueno	(Brazil) Thiago Camilo	Ipiranga Racing
2	R2	Velopark, Nova Santa Rita	April 23		(Brazil) Daniel Serra	(Brazil) Felipe Fraga	Cimed Racing Team
3	R1	Autódromo Internacional de Santa Cruz do Sul	May 21	(Brazil) Rubens Barrichello	(Brazil) Rubens Barrichello	(Brazil) Rubens Barrichello	Full Time Sports
3	R2	Autódromo Internacional de Santa Cruz do Sul	May 21		(Brazil) Ricardo Maurício	(Brazil) Ricardo Maurício	Eurofarma RC
4	R1	Autódromo Internacional de Cascavel	June 11	(Brazil) Max Wilson	(Brazil) Max Wilson	(Brazil) Max Wilson	RCM
4	R2	Autódromo Internacional de Cascavel	June 11		(Brazil) Ricardo Zonta	(Brazil) Vítor Genz	Eisenbahn Racing Team
5		9ª Corrida do Milhão Pirelli 2017, Autódromo Internacional de Curitiba	July 2	(Brazil) Daniel Serra	(Brazil) Daniel Serra	(Brazil) Daniel Serra	Eurofarma RC
6	R1	Circuito dos Cristais	July 23	(Brazil) Felipe Fraga	(Brazil) Felipe Fraga	(Brazil) Felipe Fraga	Cimed Racing Team
6	R2	Circuito dos Cristais	July 23		(Brazil) Daniel Serra	(Brazil) Gabriel Casagrande	Vogel Motorsport
7	R1	Autódromo Velo Città	August 6	(Brazil) Átila Abreu	(Brazil) Ricardo Zonta	(Brazil) Felipe Fraga	Cimed Racing Team
7	R2	Autódromo Velo Città	August 6		(Brazil) Gabriel Casagrande	(Brazil) Átila Abreu	Shell Racing
8	R1	Autódromo Internacional Ayrton Senna (Londrina)	September 10	(Brazil) Thiago Camilo	(Brazil) Rubens Barrichello	(Brazil) Thiago Camilo	Ipiranga Racing
8	R2	Autódromo Internacional Ayrton Senna (Londrina)	September 10		(Brazil) Júlio Campos	(Brazil) Ricardo Zonta	Shell Racing
9	R1	Autódromo Juan y Óscar Gálvez, Ciudad Autónoma de Buenos Aires	October 1	(Brazil) Daniel Serra	(Brazil) Daniel Serra	(Brazil) Felipe Fraga	Cimed Racing Team
9	R2	Autódromo Juan y Óscar Gálvez, Ciudad Autónoma de Buenos Aires	October 1		(Brazil) Gabriel Casagrande	(Brazil) Rubens Barrichello	Full Time Sports
10	R1	Autódromo Internacional de Tarumã	October 22	(Brazil) Galid Osman	(Brazil) Daniel Serra	(Brazil) Daniel Serra	Eurofarma RC
10	R2	Autódromo Internacional de Tarumã	October 22		(Brazil) Ricardo Maurício	(Brazil) Ricardo Maurício	Eurofarma RC
11	R1	1º HERO Push Goiânia 500 hp 2017, Autódromo Internacional Ayrton Senna (Goiânia)	November 19	(Brazil) Daniel Serra	(Brazil) Daniel Serra	(Brazil) Daniel Serra	Eurofarma RC
11	R2	1º HERO Push Goiânia 500 hp 2017, Autódromo Internacional Ayrton Senna (Goiânia)	November 19		(Brazil) Júlio Campos	(Brazil) Átila Abreu	TMG/Shell Racing
12		#AGrandeFinal 2017, Autódromo José Carlos Pace	December 10	(Brazil) Ricardo Maurício	(Brazil) Marcos Gomes	(Brazil) Ricardo Maurício	Eurofarma RC

== Championship standings ==
Points system

Points are awarded for each race at an event to the driver/s of a car that completed at least 75% of the race distance and was running at the completion of the race.

Points format	Position																			
Points format	1st	2nd	3rd	4th	5th	6th	7th	8th	9th	10th	11th	12th	13th	14th	15th	16th	17th	18th	19th	20th
Feature races	30	26	23	21	19	17	15	13	12	11	10	9	8	7	6	5	4	3	2	1
Sprint races	20	18	16	14	12	10	8	7	6	5	4	3	2	1	0					
Million race	30	25	22	20	19	18	17	16	15	14	13	12	11	10	9	8	7	5	3	1
Final race	60	52	46	42	38	34	30	26	24	22	20	18	16	14	12	10	8	6	4	2

- Feature races: Used for the first race of each event.
- Sprint races: Used for the second race of each event, with partially reversed (top ten) grid.
- Million Race: Used for One Million dollars race.
- Final race: Used for the last round of the season with double points.

=== Drivers' Championship ===
Pos	Driver	GOI		VEL		SCZ		CAS		CUR	CRI		VCA		LON		ARG		TAR		GOI		INT	Pts
1	(Brazil) Daniel Serra	**1**	6	4	7	6	17	2	15	**1**	2	6	8	2	2	Ret	**3**	21	1	22	**1**	9	3	371
2	(Brazil) Thiago Camilo	2	8	**1**	9	3	12	4	6	23	8	2	4	4	**1**	Ret	2	10	4	12	7	4	14	324
3	(Brazil) Max Wilson	3	3	6	Ret	5	Ret	**1**	17	6	5	9	Ret	Ret	12	Ret	17	2	3	Ret	6	2	2	292
4	(Brazil) Átila Abreu	5	2	Ret	4	4	7	3	8	20	12	3	**10**	**1**	8	6	10	**14**	20	2	9	**1**	28	256
5	(Brazil) Rubens Barrichello	Ret	4	7	5	**1**	18	6	5	4	Ret	14	16	Ret	3	3	21	1	9	18	6	17	5	251
6	(Brazil) Felipe Fraga	8	10	10	**1**	9	Ret	7	Ret	19	**1**	4	1	16	4	Ret	1	6	Ret	7	21	Ret	8	250
7	(Brazil) Marcos Gomes	17	20	5	3	2	Ret	10	**Ret**	2	16	12	DSQ	13	6	2	5	22	7	Ret	4	15	4	242
8	(Brazil) Ricardo Mauricio	4	16	3	8	20	1	5	21	17	3	7	19	21	13	Ret	6	20	16	1	Ret	23	**1**	241
9	(Brazil) Cacá Bueno	7	9	2	17	10	**13**	12	14	3	7	8	2	10	7	10	19	5	18	8	12	3	17	225
10	(Brazil) Gabriel Casagrande	Ret	22	9	13	16	21	20	Ret	9	10	**1**	9	3	9	5	9	7	24	5	10	6	18	184
11	(Brazil) Ricardo Zonta	Ret	1	Ret	6	7	19	18	DSQ	22	4	10	17	11	16	1	14	12	13	10	2	19	13	174
12	(Brazil) Júlio Campos	Ret	15	12	Ret	13	22	11	7	5	6	11	11	5	26	Ret	27	4	8	Ret	Ret	Ret	9	149
13	(Brazil) Diego Nunes	11	13	23	16	12	23	15	9	14	Ret	DNS	21	18	11	16	4	15	6	14	13	5	6	148
14	(Brazil) Valdeno Brito	23	18	8	2	18	14	9	DSQ	12	24	Ret	14	15	5	7	7	19	12	19	15	Ret	15	136
15	(Brazil) Vitor Genz	16	14	Ret	DNS	14	11	Ret	1	8	13	17	3	9	22	DSQ	Ret	16	25	11	18	8	10	126
16	(Brazil) Antonio Pizzonia	Ret	12	14	Ret	Ret	2	22	Ret	DSQ	20	15	5	6	10	**4**	12	8	5	Ret	Ret	11	20	126
17	(Brazil) Allam Khodair	Ret	7	19	Ret	8	8	19	19	18	14	Ret	13	8	20	9	8	DSQ	17	4	14	12	22	100
18	(Brazil) Rafael Suzuki	13	11	15	15	21	5	14	16	25	9	5	20	17	15	11	20	3	Ret	17	19	14	23	93
19	(Brazil) Galid Osman	6	Ret	Ret	DNS	15	Ret	8	20	21	Ret	21	6	19	21	18	25	Ret	**2**	13	11	24	Ret	92
20	(Brazil) Tuka Rocha	10	**17**	11	11	24	4	Ret	4	Ret	19	13	13	14	Ret	15	16	11	22	6	Ret	DNS	21	90
21	(Brazil) Denis Navarro	22	5	16	Ret	25	Ret	17	12	Ret	15	12	22	Ret	24	Ret	23	13	10	**Ret**	5	Ret	11	88
22	(Brazil) Guilherme Salas	14	Ret	22	10	22	Ret	21	3	10	17	19	25	12	23	13	13	23	Ret	19	16	22	12	87
23	(Brazil) César Ramos	9	Ret	Ret	DNS	23	10	13	14	7	25	Ret	Ret	7	18	17	15	9	21	Ret	Ret	13	25	70
24	(Brazil) Felipe Lapenna	12	Ret	24	Ret	Ret	3	16	Ret	Ret	11	DNS	Ret	Ret	25	Ret	22	Ret	11	15	Ret	10	16	65
25	(Brazil) Sergio Jimenez	18	Ret	13	12	Ret	16	Ret	Ret	Ret	18	16	7	Ret	14	8	18	17	Ret	9	Ret	20	19	59
26	(Brazil) Márcio Campos	21	Ret	17	Ret	Ret	9	Ret	Ret	13	21	23	Ret	Ret	17	Ret	Ret	DNS	19	3	Ret	DNS	Ret	43
27	(Brazil) Lucas Foresti	15	19	21	Ret	11	15	23	2	26	Ret	DNS	15	22	27	Ret	24	Ret	14	21	Ret	7	27	37
28	(Brazil) Alberto Valério	19	21	20	Ret	19	Ret	Ret	18	11	26	18	Ret	Ret	19	12	11	Ret	15	23				33
29	(Brazil) Bia Figueiredo	Ret	Ret	Ret	DNS	Ret	6	Ret	11	16	23	20	23	21	28	Ret	Ret	DNS	Ret	16	17	16	24	28
30	(Brazil) Gustavo Lima	20	Ret	18	14	17	20	Ret	10	24	22	24	18	20	Ret	14	Ret	18	23	24	Ret	Ret	Ret	19
31	(Brazil) Beto Monteiro									15			24	DSQ							Ret	21	26	9
Drivers ineligible to score points
	(Portugal) António Félix da Costa																				3	Ret		
	(Brazil) Augusto Farfus																						7	
	(Brazil) Renato Braga																				20	18	29	
Pos	Driver	GOI		VEL		SCZ		CAS		CUR	CRI		VCA		LON		ARG		TAR		GOI		INT	Pts

Colour	Result
Gold	Winner
Silver	Second place
Bronze	Third place
Green	Points classification
Blue	Non-points classification
Blue	Non-classified finish (NC)
Purple	Retired, not classified (Ret)
Red	Did not qualify (DNQ)
Red	Did not pre-qualify (DNPQ)
Black	Disqualified (DSQ)
White	Did not start (DNS)
White	Withdrew (WD)
White	Race cancelled (C)
Blank	Did not practice (DNP)
Blank	Did not arrive (DNA)
Blank	Excluded (EX)

**Bold** – Pole position
Italics – Fastest lap
† – Retired, but classified
