= Thiago Camilo =

Brazilian racing driver

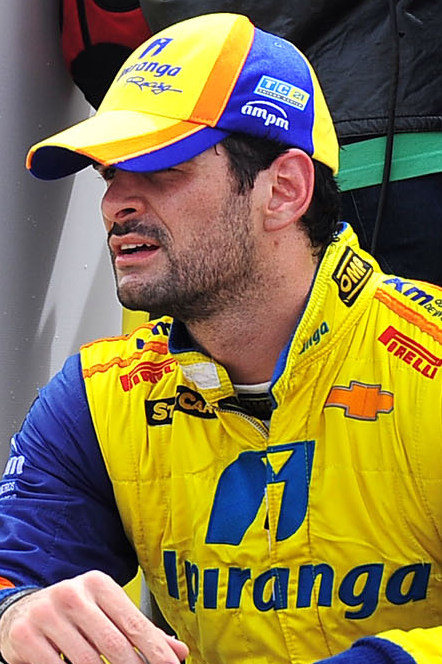
- Camilo in 2013
- Nationality: Brazilian
- Born: Thiago Camilo Palmieri; September 20, 1984 (age 42) São Paulo

Stock Car Brasil career
- Debut season: 2003
- Current team: Ipiranga Racing
- Categorisation: FIA Gold (until 2026); FIA Silver (2027–)
- Car number: 21
- Starts: 300
- Wins: 37
- Poles: 27
- Fastest laps: 36
- Best finish: 2nd in 2009, 2013, 2017, 2019

Previous series
- 2001–2002 2007–2009 2009 2010: Stock Car Light; TC 2000; GT3 Brasil Championship; Trofeo Línea

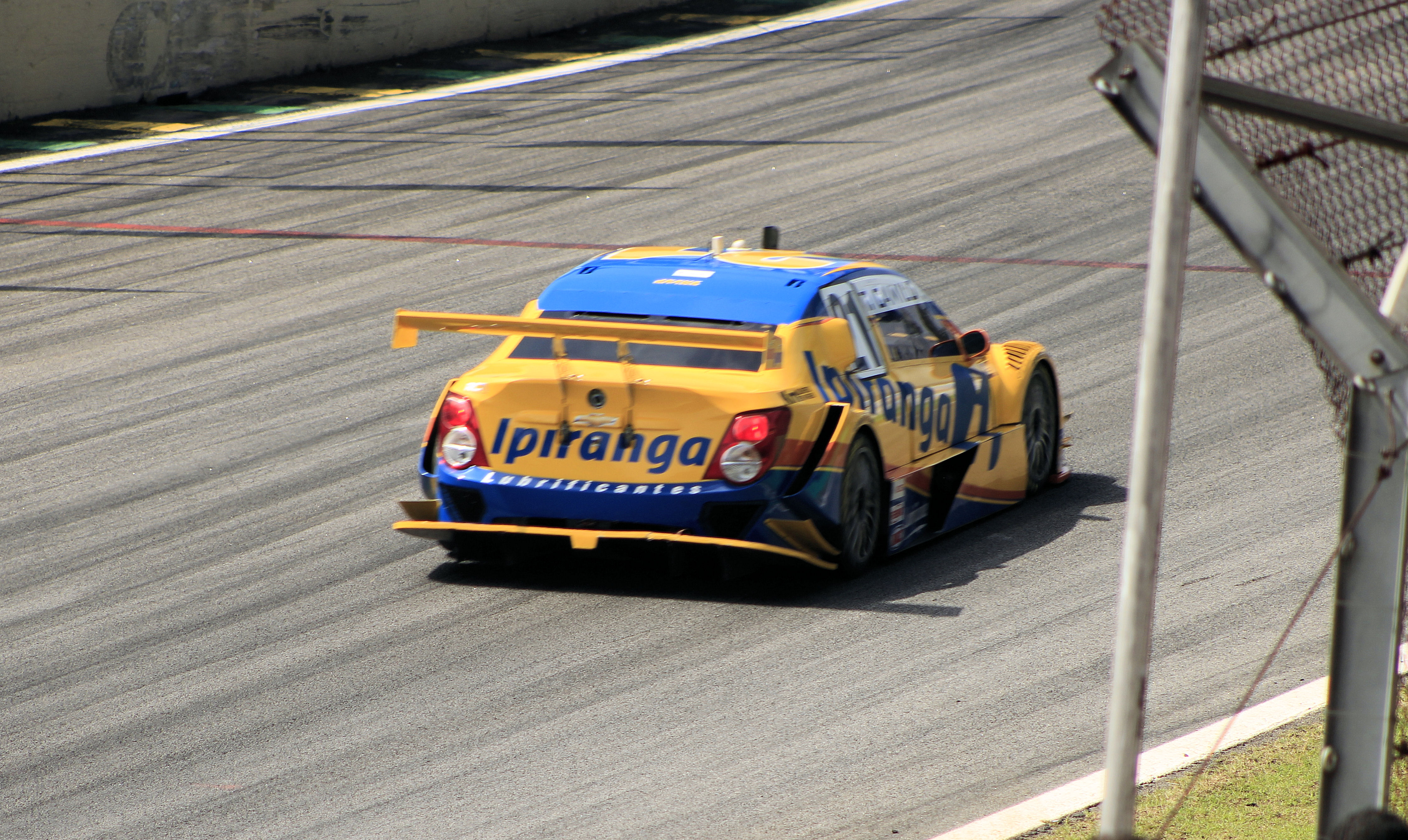
The #21 Ipiranga Racing Chevrolet Sonic being driven by Thiago Camilo at Interlagos

Thiago Camilo Palmieri (born September 20, 1984) is a Brazilian racing driver. Since 2003, he competes in the Stock Car Brasil touring car championship driving for Chevrolet. He was Runner-up in 2009 and 2013. He is a three-time winner of the Corrida do Milhão.

== Career ==
Camilo began attending racetracks in the womb, Mari. His father, Jose 'Bel' Camillo, was a pilot in various categories of tourism and ended his career in Stock V8, the year his son was making his debut (2003).

Camilo belongs to a small group of Brazilian pilots that never became interested in motor racing formula, and planned a career in tourism. In 1994, began collecting good results in disputes over the Junior category São Paulo kart. Won several regional titles in 2000. joined Stock Car Light in 2001 (was third in two years he attended)

In November 2004, Camilo won the last race of the season (November 28, at Interlagos), became the youngest driver to win the Stock Car, with 20 years, two months and eight days. That season, before the age of 20, he became the youngest driver to achieve a pole position (1 May, in Tarumã). After seven seasons on the team Vogel, where he won his eight wins and ten pole positions, four times in a row came to the Super Final (2006–2009) and was runner-up (2009). Camilo inaugurated a new partnership in 2011, now running under the baton of Rosinei Campos, RCM Motorsport team owner and champion of four of the last seven seasons in the Stock Car Brasil with the team Eurofarma RC.

== Racing record ==
=== Career summary ===
| Season | Series | Team | Races | Poles | Wins | F/Laps | Podiums | Points | Position |
|---|---|---|---|---|---|---|---|---|---|
| 2000 | Stock Car Light Brasil | Bel Racing | 4 | 0 | 0 | 0 | 0 | 4 | 20th |
| 2001 | Stock Car Light Brasil | Bel Racing | 10 | 2 | 2 | 1 | 5 | 84 | 3rd |
| 2002 | Stock Car Light Brasil | Scuderia Lobo | 10 | 2 | 4 | 4 | 6 | 119 | 3rd |
| 2003 | Stock Car Brasil | RC Competições | 12 | 0 | 0 | 0 | 0 | 34 | 17th |
| 2004 | Stock Car Brasil | Vogel Motorsport | 12 | 2 | 2 | 2 | 5 | 128 | 4th |
| 2005 | Stock Car Brasil | Vogel Motorsport | 12 | 1 | 1 | 3 | 2 | 71 | 7th |
| 2006 | Stock Car Brasil | Vogel Motorsport | 12 | 1 | 1 | 0 | 2 | 237 | 6th |
| 2007 | Stock Car Brasil | Vogel Motorsport | 12 | 1 | 2 | 3 | 4 | 247 | 3rd |
| 2007 | TC 2000 | Toyota Team Argentina | 1 | 0 | 0 | 0 | 0 | N/A | NC |
| 2008 | Stock Car Brasil | Vogel Motorsport | 12 | 2 | 1 | 3 | 5 | 277 | 3rd |
| 2008 | TC 2000 | Renault Lo Jack Team | 1 | 0 | 0 | 0 | 0 | N/A | NC |
| 2009 | Stock Car Brasil | Vogel Motorsport | 12 | 2 | 2 | 1 | 3 | 269 | 2nd |
| 2009 | TC 2000 | Renault Lo Jack Team | 3 | 0 | 0 | 0 | 1 | N/A | NC |
| 2009 | TC 2000 Copa Endurance Series | Renault Lo Jack Team | 3 | 0 | 0 | 0 | 1 | 24 | 6th |
| 2009 | GT3 Brasil Championship | WB Motorsport | 9 | 2 | 0 | 1 | 7 | 131 | 6th |
| 2010 | Stock Car Brasil | Vogel Motorsport | 12 | 0 | 1 | 1 | 2 | 56 | 12th |
| 2010 | Trofeo Linea Brasil | Engmakers Racing Team | 12 | 0 | 0 | 1 | 0 | 18 | 17th |
| 2011 | Stock Car Brasil | RCM Motorsport | 12 | 3 | 0 | 2 | 5 | 232 | 8th |
| 2011 | Brasileiro de Marcas | Carlos Alves Competições | 16 | 6 | 1 | 2 | 7 | 257 | 1st |
| 2012 | Stock Car Brasil | RCM Motorsport | 12 | 2 | 1 | 1 | 4 | 158 | 5th |
| 2012 | Brasileiro de Marcas | Carlos Alves Competições | 7 | 2 | 0 | 1 | 3 | 101 | 11th |
| 2012 | Copa Fiat Brasil | Pater Racing | 3 | 1 | 1 | 1 | 1 | 38 | 9th |
| 2013 | Stock Car Brasil | Ipiranga-RCM | 12 | 2 | 1 | 0 | 7 | 215 | 2nd |
| 2013 | Brasileiro de Marcas | Amir Nasr Racing | 2 | 0 | 0 | 0 | 0 | 14 | 26th |
| 2014 | Stock Car Brasil | Ipiranga-RCM | 21 | 3 | 1 | 3 | 4 | 174.5 | 6th |
| 2014 | Brasileiro de Marcas | Full Time Competições | 3 | 1 | 0 | 1 | 2 | 41 | 16th |
| 2015 | Stock Car Brasil | Ipiranga-RCM | 21 | 2 | 0 | 1 | 5 | 193 | 3rd |
| 2016 | Stock Car Brasil | Ipiranga-RCM | 21 | 1 | 0 | 4 | 3 | 141 | 15th |
| 2016 | Porsche Endurance Series | N/A | 1 | 0 | 0 | 0 | 0 | 50 | 31st |
| 2017 | Stock Car Brasil | Ipiranga Racing | 22 | 2 | 1 | 0 | 6 | 310 | 2nd |
| 2018 | Stock Car Brasil | Ipiranga Racing | 21 | 0 | 0 | 2 | 1 | 134 | 11th |
| 2019 | Stock Car Brasil | Ipiranga Racing | 20 | 6 | 6 | 3 | 7 | 366 | 2nd |
| 2020 | Stock Car Brasil | Ipiranga Racing | 18 | 3 | 4 | 1 | 4 | 238 | 4th |
| 2020 | Porsche Endurance Series - Carrera Cup | N/A | 2 | 0 | 0 | 0 | 2 | 155 | 7th |
| 2020 | GT Sprint Race Brasil - Pro | N/A | 12 | 3 | 5 | 5 | 7 | 217 | 2nd |
| 2020 | GT Sprint Race Special Edition - Pro | N/A | 6 | 2 | 0 | 2 | 3 | 102 | 3rd |
| 2021 | Stock Car Pro Series | Ipiranga Racing | 24 | 5 | 2 | 2 | 7 | 310 | 3rd |
| 2021 | Porsche Endurance Series - Carrera Cup | N/A | 3 | 0 | 0 | 0 | 0 | 39 | 22nd |
| 2021 | GT Sprint Race Brasil - Pro | N/A | 9 | 2 | 0 | 0 | 3 | 153 | 8th |
| 2021 | GT Sprint Race Special Edition - Pro | N/A | 9 | 3 | 2 | 3 | 6 | 189 | 1st |
| 2021 | Michelin Pilot Challenge - GS | Riley Motorsports | 1 | 0 | 0 | 0 | 0 | 230 | 47th |
| 2022 | Stock Car Pro Series | Ipiranga Racing | 1 | 0 | 0 | 0 | 1 | 31 | 3rd* |
| 2022 | Michelin Pilot Challenge - GS | Riley Motorsports | 6 | 0 | 0 | 0 | 1 | 1140 | 27th |
| 2022 | TCR South America Touring Car Championship | Toyota Gazoo Racing Latin America | 1 | 0 | 0 | 0 | 0 | 0 | NC |
| 2023 | Michelin Pilot Challenge - GS | Ave Motorsports | 6 | 0 | 0 | 0 | 0 | 840 | 27th |
| 2025 | Michelin Pilot Challenge - GS | Panam Motorsport | | | | | | | |
| 2025 | NASCAR Brasil Series | Full Time Sports | | | | | | | |
| 2026 | Michelin Pilot Challenge - GS | Panam Motorsport | | | | | | | |

=== Complete Stock Car Brasil results ===
| Year | Team | Car | 1 | 2 | 3 | 4 | 5 | 6 | 7 | 8 | 9 | 10 | 11 | 12 | 13 | 14 | 15 | 16 | 17 | 18 | 19 | 20 | 21 | Rank | Points |
|---|---|---|---|---|---|---|---|---|---|---|---|---|---|---|---|---|---|---|---|---|---|---|---|---|---|
| 2003 | Scuderia Lobo | Chevrolet Astra | CTB; 7 | CGD; Ret | INT; 6 | RIO; Ret | LON; 7 | INT; Ret | CTB; Ret | CGD; Ret | RIO; Ret | BSB; Ret | CTB; Ret | INT; 10 | | | | | | | | | | 17th | 34 |
| 2004 | Golden Cross-Vogel | Chevrolet Vectra | CTB; 9 | INT; 2 | TAR; Ret | LON; 10 | RIO; 2 | INT; 17 | CTB; Ret | LON; 19 | RIO; 6 | BSB; 2 | CGD; 2 | INT; 1 | | | | | | | | | | 4th | 128 |
| 2005 | Vogel-Texaco | Chevrolet Astra | INT; Ret | CTB; Ret | RIO; 1 | INT; Ret | CTB; Ret | LON; 21 | BSB; 12 | SCZ; Ret | TAR; 4 | ARG; Ret | RIO; 3 | INT; 5 | | | | | | | | | | 7th | 71 |
| 2006 | Vogel-Texaco | Chevrolet Astra | INT; 8 | CTB; 4 | CGD; Ret | INT; 2 | LON; 25 | CTB; 1 | SCZ; 5 | BSB; 4 | TAR; Ret | ARG; 5 | RIO; 7 | INT; Ret | | | | | | | | | | 6th | 237 |
| 2007 | Vogel-Texaco | Chevrolet Astra | INT; 23 | CTB; 2 | CGD; 2 | INT; 5 | LON; 1 | SCZ; Ret | CTB; Ret | BSB; 8 | ARG; 2 | TAR; 6 | RIO; Ret | INT; Ret | | | | | | | | | | 3rd | 247 |
| 2008 | Vogel Motorsport | Chevrolet Astra | INT; 2 | BSB; 5 | CTB; 6 | SCZ; Ret | CGD; 5 | INT; 2 | RIO; 4 | LON; 1 | CTB; 3 | BSB; 10 | TAR; 4 | INT; 1 | | | | | | | | | | 3rd | 277 |
| 2009 | Vogel Motorsport | Chevrolet Vectra | INT; Ret | CTB; 3 | BSB; 7 | SCZ; DSQ | INT; 27 | SAL; Ret | RIO; 7 | CGD; 1 | CTB; 4 | BSB; 8 | TAR; 7 | INT; 1 | | | | | | | | | | 2nd | 269 |
| 2010 | Vogel Motorsport | Chevrolet Vectra | INT; 18 | CTB; 6 | VEL; Ret | RIO; Ret | RBP; 20 | SAL; 2 | INT; 5 | CGD; DSQ | LON; Ret | SCZ; DSQ | BSB; 3 | CTB; DSQ | | | | | | | | | | 12th | 56 |
| 2011 | RCM Motorsport | Chevrolet Vectra | CTB; 1 | INT; 4 | RBP; 8 | VEL; 2 | CGD; 4 | RIO; 3 | INT; 1 | SAL; 1 | SCZ; Ret | LON; Ret | BSB; 18 | VEL; 9 | | | | | | | | | | 8th | 232 |
| 2012 | RCM Motorsport | Chevrolet Sonic | INT; 2 | CTB; Ret | VEL; Ret | RBP; 6 | LON; 4 | RIO; 2 | SAL; 7 | CAS; 16 | TAR; 1 | CTB; Ret | BSB; 21 | INT; 1 | | | | | | | | | | 5th | 158 |
| 2013 | Ipiranga-RCM | Chevrolet Sonic | INT; 19 | CUR; 3 | TAR; 2 | SAL; 3 | BRA; 3 | CAS; 9 | RBP; 1 | CAS; 5 | VEL; 8 | CUR; 2 | BRA; 1 | INT; 6 | | | | | | | | | | 2nd | 215 |
| 2014 | Ipiranga-RCM | Chevrolet Sonic | INT; 1 | SCZ; 1 | SCZ; 2 | BRA; 1 | BRA; 2 | GOI; 1 | GOI; 2 | GOI; 1 | CAS; 1 | CAS; 2 | CUR; 1 | CUR; 2 | VEL; 1 | VEL; 2 | SAL; 1 | SAL; 2 | TAR; 1 | TAR; 2 | RBP; 1 | RBP; 2 | CUR; 1 | NC | N/A |
