= Galid Osman =

Brazilian auto racing driver (born 1986)

Galid Osman Jr
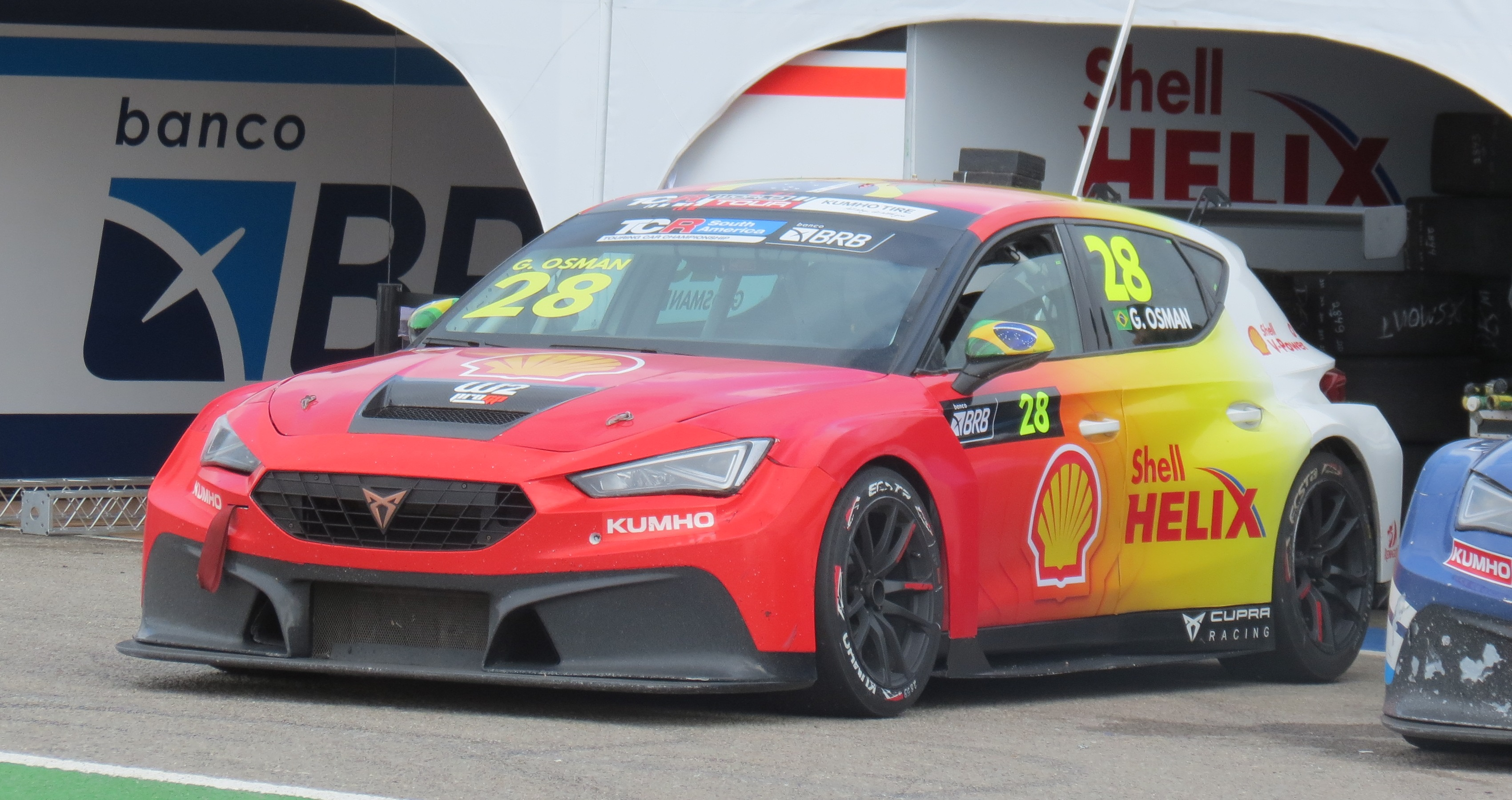
- Nationality: (Brazil) Brazilian
- Born: Galid Osman Didi Jr. 18 February 1986 (age 40) São Paulo, Brazil

Stock Car Brasil career
- Current team: Shell V-Power
- Car number: 28

Galid Osman Didi Jr. (born 18 February 1986) is a Brazilian auto racing driver. Osman won the 2023 TCR Brazil Touring Car Championship.

In 2010 and 2011, Osman raced at the Copa Chevrolet Montana, finishing eighth and fourth respectively. Since then, he drives in the Brazilian V8 Stock Car Series, where he finished 16th in the 2012 overall standings, 19th in 2013 and 17th in 2014. He has also raced at the Brasileiro de Marcas, where he finished in tenth in 2011 and 20th in 2012 with Chevrolet, and eighth in 2013 and 2014 with Toyota.

== Racing record ==
=== Career summary ===
Season	Series	Team	Races	Wins	Poles	F.Laps	Podiums	Points	Position
2002	Fórmula São Paulo	N/A	10	1	1	1	8	N/A	2nd
2003	Formula Renault 2.0 Brazil	Gramacho Racing	7	0	0	0	0	16	21st
2004	Formula Renault 2.0 Brazil	Dragão Racing	2	0	0	0	0	N/A	NC
2005	Fórmula São Paulo	N/A	10	4	2	4	8	N/A	1st
2006	Formula Renault 2.0 Brazil	Full Time Racing	13	1	2	2	3	124	4th
2007	Stock Car Brasil	Scuderia 111	1	0	0	0	0	N/A	NC
2008	Copa Vicar	Scuderia 111	9	0	1	2	1	21	21st
2009	Copa Vicar	Full Time Junior Team	9	0	0	0	0	25	20th
2010	Copa Chevrolet Montana	Carlos Alves Competições	9	1	2	3	2	71	8th
2011	Copa Chevrolet Montana	Carlos Alves Competições	9	1	4	1	4	102	4th
2011	Brasileiro de Marcas	Carlos Alves Competições	13	0	0	1	2	95	10th
2011	Fórmula 3 Sudamericana	Hitech Racing Brazil	2	0	0	0	0	N/A	NC
2012	Stock Car Brasil	BMC Racing	12	0	0	0	0	72	16th
2012	Brasileiro de Marcas	Carlos Alves Competições	14	0	0	0	0	44	20th
2013	Stock Car Brasil	Ipiranga-RCM	12	0	0	0	0	64	19th
2013	Brasileiro de Marcas	Toyota RZ	16	2	1	0	2	165	8th
2014	Stock Car Brasil	Ipiranga-RCM	21	1	0	0	4	101.5	17th
2014	Brasileiro de Marcas	RZ Motorsport Toyota	15	1	1	1	2	172	8th
2014	Súper TC 2000	N/A	1	0	0	0	0	N/A	NC
2015	Stock Car Brasil	Ipiranga-RCM	21	0	0	0	0	92	20th
2016	Stock Car Brasil	Ipiranga-RCM	20	1	0	0	1	142	14th
2017	Stock Car Brasil	Ipiranga Racing	22	0	1	0	1	92	19th
2018	Stock Car Brasil	Cavaleiro Sports	20	0	0	0	0	4	34th
2019	Stock Car Brasil	Shell Helix Ultra	20	0	0	0	0	130	16th
2020	Stock Car Brasil	Shell V-Power	17	0	0	0	0	107	17th
2020	Porsche Endurance Series - Cup	N/A	1	0	0	0	0	45	20th
2020	GT Sprint Race Special Edition - Pro	N/A	3	1	1	0	2	73	5th
2021	Stock Car Pro Series	Shell V-Power	24	0	0	0	0	132	19th
2021	Porsche Endurance Series - Cup	N/A	3	0	0	0	0	N/A	NC
2022	Stock Car Pro Series	Shell V-Power	23	0	0	0	0	166	15th
2023	TCR South America Touring Car Championship	W2 Shell V-Power	18	2	0	2	5	356	5th
2023	TCR World Tour	W2 Shell V-Power	4	0	0	0	0	13	30th
2023	TCR Brazil Touring Car Championship	W2 Shell V-Power	11	3	0	1	5	262	1st
2024	TCR South America Touring Car Championship	W2 Shell V-Power	19	1	0	1	5	328	7th
2024	TCR World Tour	W2 Shell V-Power	4	0	0	0	0	0	53rd
2024	TCR Brazil Touring Car Championship	W2 Shell V-Power	11	2	1	0	4	230	5th
2025	NASCAR Brasil Series	Team RC							
2026	International GT Open	AF Corse	14	0	0	0	0	0	53rd
2026	TCR South America Touring Car Championship	Uruguay Racing Team							
