= Brasileiro de Marcas =

Car racing competition

- Category: Touring cars
- Country: Brazil
- Inaugural season: 2011
- Folded: 2018
- Constructors: Chevrolet; Ford; Honda; Mitsubishi; Toyota
- Tyre suppliers: Pirelli
- Last Drivers' champion: (Brazil) Vicente Orige
- Last Makes' champion: Chevrolet
- Last Teams' champion: Onze Motorsport
- Official website: brasileirodemarcas.com.br

The Brasileiro de Marcas (Brazilian Brands), also known as Copa Petrobras de Marcas under sponsorship, was a touring car racing series based in Brazil.

From 2011 until 2018, this new Brasileiro de Marcas continued the former Campeonato Brasileiro de Marcas e Pilotos (Brazilian Championship of Brands and Drivers). which had been discontinued after 2009.

== History ==
The Campeonato Brasileiro de Marcas e Pilotos (Brazilian Championship of Brand and Drivers) was a touring car racing based in Brazil. It had two incarnations, the first one between 1983 and 1994, and the second one between 2004 and 2009.

Start in 1983 the Campeonato Brasileiro de Marcas e Pilotos was a strong touring car racing championship, with direct involvement of the manufactures, had its last year of competition in 1994, the champions were Egon Herzfield and Vicente Daudt, who run with the Ford Escort. At the end of 1994 season, the promise was that we would have for the 1995 season imported cars, utilize in some championships as; BTCC or DTM, but this promise was not fulfilled and the championship was declared ended.

After ten years, in 2004 that announced the return of the championship with new rules and cars, organized for Toninho de Souza and Brazilian Confederation of Auto Racing (CBA), the championship not obtained success and was ended in 2009.

=== Brasileiro de Marcas ===
In 2011 was announced the return of the championship with Brasileiro de Marcas name and completely reworked. The return of the championship in 2011, organized by Vicar and participation by several teams and drivers of Stock Car Brasil, has with object, return of disputes by manufacturers in Brazil. Chevrolet, Ford and Honda officially entering and Toyota partly. Thiago Camilo won the title, Chevrolet won the Manufactures' championship and Full Time Sports the Teams' championship.

== Manufacturer representation ==
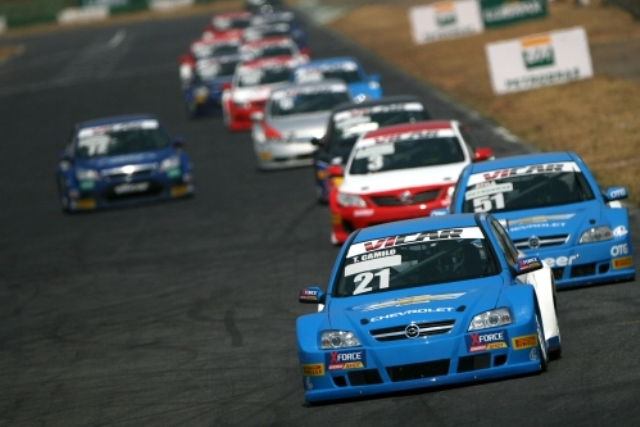
Thiago Camilo leading the race in Brasília 2011

Chevrolet

- Chevrolet Astra: 2011
- Chevrolet Cruze: 2012–2018

Ford

- Ford Focus: 2011–2018

Honda

- Honda Civic: 2011–2018

Mitsubishi

- Mitisubishi Lancer GT: 2012–2018

Renault

- Renault Fluence: 2015–2018

Toyota

- Toyota Corolla: 2011
- Toyota Corolla XRS: 2012–2018

== Scoring system ==
Position	1	2	3	4	5	6	7	8	9	10	11	12	13	14	15
Points	25	20	16	14	12	10	9	8	7	6	5	4	3	2	1

== Champions ==
=== Campeonato Brasileiro de Marcas e Pilotos ===
Year	Drivers	Car
1983	Antonio da Matta	Fiat 147
1984	Jayme Figueiredo; Xandy Negrão	Volkswagen Voyage
1985	Fábio Greco; Lian Duarte	Volkswagen Voyage
1986	Armando Balbi; Xandy Negrão	Volkswagen Passat
1987	Clemente Faria; Vinicius Pimentel	Volkswagen Passat
1988	Andreas Mattheis	Volkswagen Passat
1989	Antonio da Matta; Gunnar Volmer	Volkswagen Passat
1990	Andreas Mattheis; Ricardo Cosac	Volkswagen Passat
1991	Paulo Gomes; Claudio Girotto	Volkswagen Passat Voyage
1992	Andreas Mattheis; Paulo Judice	Ford Escort
1993	Andreas Mattheis; Paulo Judice	Ford Escort
1994	Egon Herzfield; Vicente Daudt	Ford Escort
1995 – 2003	Not held	
2004	Rodrigo Navarro	Volkswagen Gol
2005	Rafael Iserhard	Chevrolet Corsa
2006	Fabio Ebrahim	Volkswagen Gol
2007	Geraldo Sermann	Volkswagen Gol
2008	Not held	
2009	Marco Romanini	Volkswagen Gol
2010	Not held	

=== Brasileiro de Marcas ===
Season	Driver	Car	Team	Makes' champion	Teams' champion
2011	Thiago Camilo	Chevrolet Astra	Carlos Alves Competições	Chevrolet	Full Time Sports
2012	Ricardo Maurício	Honda Civic	Full Time Sports	Toyota	Full Time Sports
2013	Ricardo Maurício	Honda Civic	JLM Racing	Honda	JLM Racing
2014	Ricardo Maurício	Honda Civic	JLM Racing	Toyota	JLM Racing
2015	Vítor Meira	Honda Civic	JLM Racing	Honda	JLM Racing
2016	Nonô Figueiredo	Chevrolet Cruze	Onze Motorsport	Honda	JLM Racing
2017	Vicente Orige	Chevrolet Cruze	JLM Racing	Chevrolet	JLM Racing
2018	Vicente Orige	Chevrolet Cruze	JLM Racing	Chevrolet	JLM Racing

== See also ==
- Stock Car Brasil
- TC 2000 Championship
- TCR Brasil Touring Car Championship
