= Juliano Moro =

Brazilian racing driver (born 1977)

- Nationality: (Brazil) Brazilian
- Born: 13 September 1977 (age 49) Porto Alegre (Brazil)

Brasileiro de Marcas career
- Debut season: 2011
- Current team: JLM Racing
- Car number: 6
- Starts: 14
- Wins: 1
- Fastest laps: 2
- Best finish: 7th in 2011

Previous series
- 2010–11 2004–10 2002 2002 1998 1996–97 2000–03: GT3 Brasil Championship; Stock Car Brasil; Euro Formula 3000; German Formula Three Championship; Formula Palmer Audi; Formula Three Sudamericana

Championship titles
- 2001: Formula Three Sudamericana

Juliano Moro (born 13 September 1977) is a Brazilian racing driver. He has raced in such series as Euro Formula 3000 and Stock Car Brasil. He won the Formula Three Sudamericana series in 2001, Fórmula Ford and other Endurance championships.

== Racing record ==
=== Career summary ===
| Season | Series | Team name | Races | Poles | Wins | Podiums | F/Laps | Points | Position |
|---|---|---|---|---|---|---|---|---|---|
| 1996 | Formula Three Sudamericana | | ? | ? | 1 | 1 | 1 | ? | ? |
| 1997 | Formula Three Sudamericana | Amir Nasr Racing | ? | 0 | 1 | 1 | ? | 23 | 12th |
| 1998 | Formula Palmer Audi | | 16 | ? | 0 | 1 | ? | 120 | 10th |
| 2000 | Formula Three Sudamericana | Amir Nasr Racing | 18 | 0 | 1 | 9 | 1 | 158 | **3rd** |
| 2001 | Formula Three Sudamericana | Amir Nasr Racing | 12 | 5 | 5 | 8 | 4 | 155 | **1st** |
| 2002 | Euro Formula 3000 | ISR Racing | 8 | 0 | 0 | 0 | 0 | 0 | N/A |
| 2002 | German Formula Three Championship | Opel Team KMS | 2 | 0 | 0 | 0 | 0 | 0 | N/A |
| 2002 | Formula Three Sudamericana | Amir Nasr Racing | 2 | 0 | 0 | 0 | 0 | 0 | N/A |
| 2003 | Formula Three Sudamericana | Amir Nasr Racing | 2 | 0 | 0 | 0 | 0 | 16 | 17th |
| 2004 | Stock Car Brasil | NasrCastroneves | 12 | 0 | 0 | 0 | 0 | 7 | 31st |
| 2005 | Stock Car Brasil | NasrCastroneves | 10 | 0 | 0 | 0 | 0 | 22 | 26th |
| 2006 | Stock Car Brasil | Nascar Motorsport | 10 | 0 | 0 | 0 | 1 | 3 | 37th |
| 2007 | Stock Car Brasil | Nascar Motorsport | 12 | 0 | 0 | 0 | 0 | 33 | 22nd |
| 2008 | Stock Car Brasil | Hot Car Competições | 12 | 0 | 0 | 0 | 0 | 25 | 20th |
| 2009 | Copa Vicar | Nascar Motorsport | 7 | 0 | 0 | 1 | 0 | 35 | 15th |
| 2010 | GT3 Brasil Championship - GT3 | AH Competições | 6 | 0 | 0 | 0 | 0 | 25 | 26th |
| 2010 | Stock Car Brasil | Crystal Racing Team | 2 | 0 | 0 | 1 | 0 | 1 | 34th |
| 2011 | GT3 Brasil Championship - GT3 | AH Competições | 12 | 1 | 0 | 6 | 0 | 124 | 11th |
| 2011 | TC 2000 Championship | Equipo Petrobras | 1 | 0 | 0 | 0 | 0 | 0 | N/A |
| 2011 | Brasileiro de Marcas | Auto Racing | 12 | 0 | 0 | 4 | 2 | 122 | 7th |
| 2012 | Brasileiro de Marcas | JLM Racing | 4 | 0 | 1 | 1 | 0 | 45 | 4th |

=== Complete Euro Formula 3000 results ===
(key) (Races in bold indicate pole position; races in italics indicate fastest lap)

| Year | Entrant | 1 | 2 | 3 | 4 | 5 | 6 | 7 | 8 | 9 | DC | Points |
|---|---|---|---|---|---|---|---|---|---|---|---|---|
| 2002 | Charouz ISR Racing | VLL; 15 | PER; Ret | MOZ; Ret | SPA; 11 | DON | BRN | DIJ | JER | CAG | 6th | 14 |

Sporting positions
| Preceded by Vítor Meira | Formula Three Sudamericana Champion; 2001 | Succeeded by Nelson Piquet Jr. |
