= Amir Nasr Racing =

Former Brazilian auto racing team

(Brazil) Amir Nasr Racing
- Founded: 1980
- Folded: 2015
- Team principal(s): Amir Nasr
- Former series: Stock Car Brasil; Formula 3 Sudamericana; Formula Renault 2.0 Brazil
- Drivers' Championships: Formula 3 Sudamericana; 2000. Vitor Meira; 2001. Juliano Moro

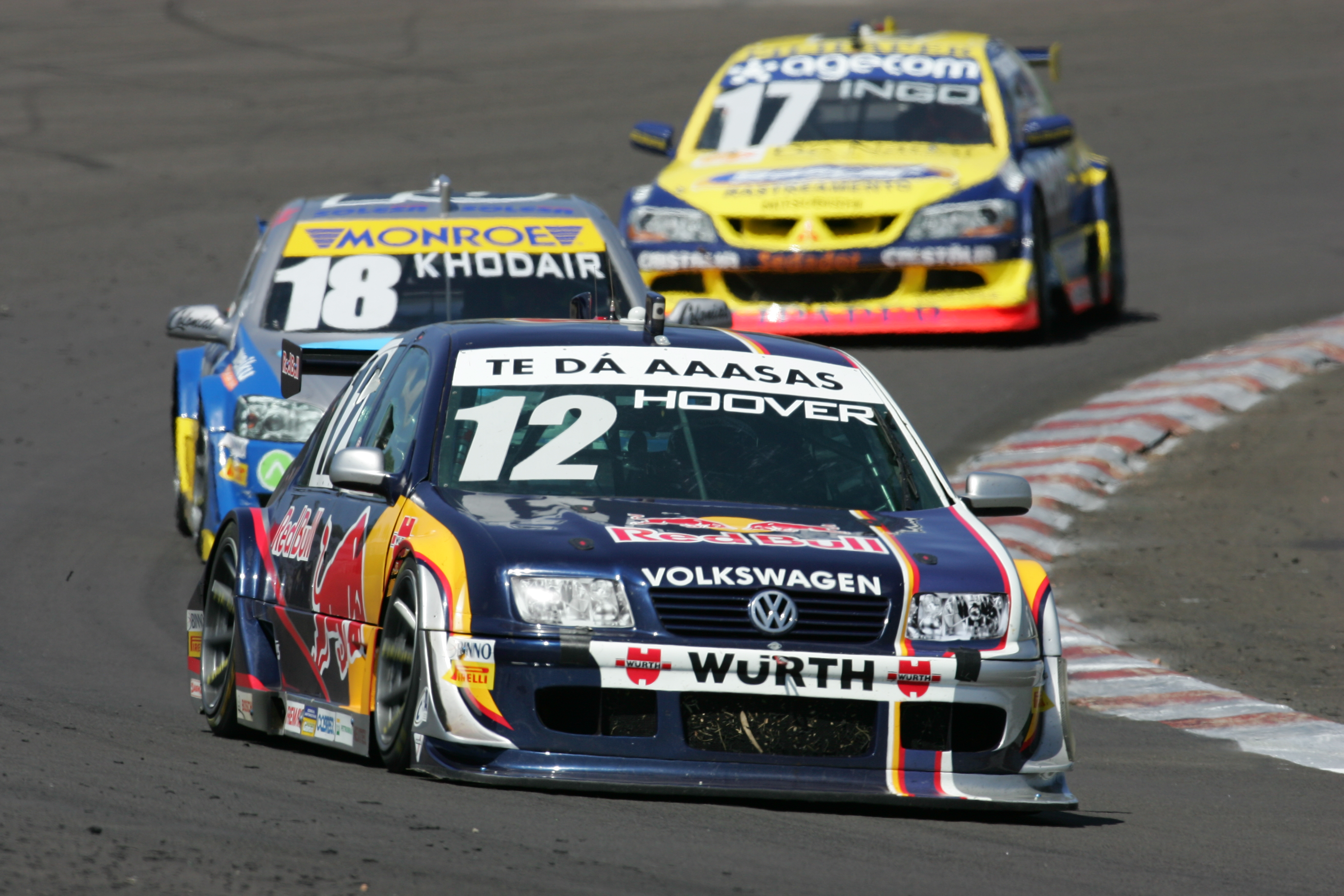
Amir Nasr Racing-Red Bull driver Hoover Orsi leads in the 2007 Stock Car Brasil season.

Amir Nasr Racing was a Brazilian auto racing team based in Brasília. The team was created in 1980 by Amir Nasr under the "Brasília Racing" name.

Amir Nasr Racing competed in Formula 3 Sudamericana and Formula Renault 2.0 Brazil all with race winning success that helped with the progression of many Brazilian drivers in junior formulas, such as Hélio Castroneves, Vítor Meira, Antônio Pizzonia, Luciano Burti, Bruno Junqueira, Cristiano da Matta, Mário Haberfeld, Max Wilson, Átila Abreu and Sérgio Jimenez.

== Stock Car ==
The teams' first Stock Car Brasil appearance was in 2004 in a partnership with Brazilian racing driver Helio Castroneves as NasrCastroneves. From 2007 until 2008 the team was renamed to Red Bull Racing after Red Bull started a partnership with the team.

== Personal life ==
Amir Nasr is of Lebanese ancestry, his father having emigrated to Brazil in the 1960s. Nasr is uncle and manager of Brazilian racing driver Felipe Nasr.
