= Autódromo Internacional de Tarumã =

Motorsport racetrack in Viamão, Brazil

- Full Circuit (1970–present)
- Location: Viamão, Rio Grande do Sul, Brazil
- Coordinates: 30°2′55″S 51°1′9″W
- Opened: 8 November 1970; 55 years ago
- Major events: Current: Fórmula Truck (1996, 2003–2006, 2013, 2016, 2024, 2026); 12 Hours of Tarumã (1971–1976, 1984, 1986–1991, 1993–present); Former: Stock Car Pro Series (1979–1981, 1983–1996, 1998–2001, 2004–2009, 2012–2017, 2023); NASCAR Brasil (2013, 2015, 2021–2025); Copa Truck (2017, 2021–2025); Fórmula 3 Brasil (2014); F4 Sudamericana (2014); Campeonato Sudamericano de GT (2007, 2013); F3 Sudamericana (1987–1992, 2000, 2004–2007, 2012–2013); SASTC (1997)

Full Circuit (1970–present)
- Length: 3.039 km (1.888 mi)
- Turns: 9
- Race lap record: 0:56.822 ( (Brazil) Rodrigo González, Dallara F309, 2012, F3)

Stock Car Circuit (2014–present)
- Length: 3.069 km (1.907 mi)
- Turns: 11
- Race lap record: 1:08.551 ( (Brazil) Daniel Serra, Chevrolet Cruze Stock Car, 2017, Stock Car Brasil)

Autódromo Internacional de Tarumã is a 3.039 km (1.888 mi) motorsports circuit located in Viamão, Rio Grande do Sul, Brazil. It hosts national championships such as Stock Car Pro Series and Copa Truck. Previously it hosted the Brazilian Formula Renault, Formula 3 Sudamericana and Brazilian Formula Three Championship.

In 1982, a Formula Two race was held that would be the predecessor of Formula Two Codasur.

== Lap records ==
As of October 2024, the fastest official lap records at the Autódromo Internacional de Tarumã are listed as:

Category	Time	Driver	Vehicle	Event
Full Circuit (1970–present): 3.039 km (1.888 mi)
Formula Three	0:56.822	Rodrigo González	Dallara F309	2012 Tarumã F3 Sudamericana round
Formula Renault 2.0	1:00.955	Vinicius Quadros	Tatuus FR2000	2006 Tarumã Formula Renault 2.0 Brazil round
GT3	1:01.768	Allam Khodair	Lamborghini Gallardo LP600+ GT3	2013 Tarumã Campeonato Sudamericano de GT round
Formula Two	1:02.710	Carlos Pace	March 712M	1971 Tarumã F2 round
Stock Car Brasil	1:03.160	Daniel Serra	Chevrolet Sonic	2013 Tarumã Stock Car Brasil round
Stock Series	1:07.074	Zezinho Muggiati	Chevrolet Cruze JL-G12	2023 Tarumã Stock Series round
GT4	1:07.398	Sergio Laganá	Aston Martin Vantage GT4	2013 Tarumã Campeonato Sudamericano de GT round
Formula Renault 1.6	1:08.342	Agustín Lima Capitao	Signatech Formula	2014 Tarumã F4 Sudamericana round
NASCAR Brasil	1:10.950	Leo Torres	Chevrolet Camaro NASCAR Brasil	2024 Tarumã NASCAR Brasil round
Super Touring	1:11.400	Javier Balzano	Chevrolet Vectra 16v	1997 Tarumã SASTC round
Turismo Nacional BR	1:17.956	Juninho Berlanda	Toyota Yaris	2023 Tarumã Turismo Nacional Brasil round
Truck racing	1:21.625	Danilo Dirani	Scania Truck	2017 Tarumã Copa Truck round
Stock Car Circuit (2014–present): 3.069 km (1.907 mi)
Stock Car Brasil	1:08.551	Daniel Serra	Chevrolet Cruze Stock Car	2017 Tarumã Stock Car Brasil round
