= Alceu Feldmann =

Brazilian racing driver

- Nationality: (Brazil) Brazilian
- Born: Alceu Elias Feldmann Filho; July 4, 1973 (age 53) Pouso Redondo, Santa Catarina (Brazil)
- Relatives: Alceu Feldmann Neto (son)

Stock Car Brasil career
- Debut season: 2000
- Wins: 1
- Poles: 0

Alceu Elias Feldmann Filho (born September 4, 1972) is a Brazilian racing driver. Feldmann has 13 seasons in Stock Car Brasil.

== Suspension ==
On July 4, 2012, it was announced that Feldmann was to be suspended from racing for 24 months, due to refusal to take the anti-doping examination in fifth round at Velopark. Feldmann is appealing the decision and was released to race at Rio de Janeiro. On 15 August 2012, was decided maintenance will 24 months suspension.
