= Gabriel Casagrande =

Brazilian racing driver (born 1995)

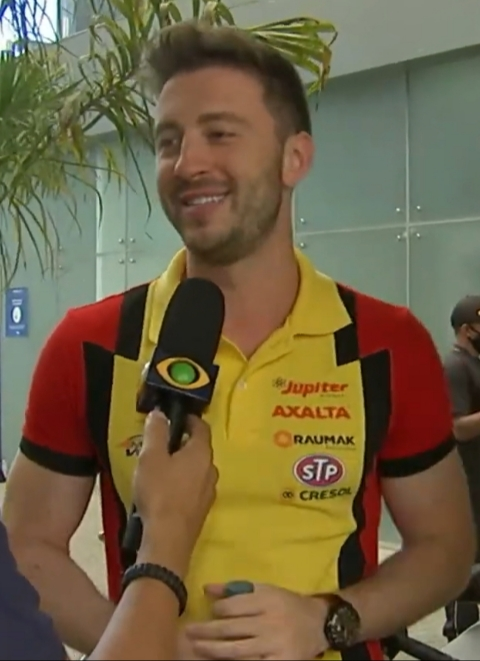
- Casagrande in 2021
- Nationality: Brazilian
- Born: Gabriel Meimberg Casagrande; 20 February 1995 (age 31) Francisco Beltrão, Paraná, Brazil

Stock Car Pro Series career
- Debut season: 2013
- Current team: Vogel Motorsport
- Categorisation: FIA Silver
- Car number: 83
- Former teams: RC3 Bassani; C2 Team; Crown Racing; R.Mattheis Motorsport
- Starts: 227
- Championships: 3 (2021, 2023, 2024)
- Wins: 12
- Poles: 9
- Fastest laps: 11
- Best finish: 1st in 2021, 2023, 2024

Championship titles
- 2021, 2023, 2024 2023: Stock Car Brasil; NASCAR Brasil Sprint Race Special Edition ProAM

Gabriel Meimberg Casagrande (born 20 February 1995) is a Brazilian racing driver. He competes full-time in the Stock Car Pro Series, driving the No. 83 Chevrolet Cruze for A. Mattheis Vogel Motorsport. He is a three-time champion of the Stock Car Pro Series, having won this title in 2021, 2023 and 2024. He also competes in the NASCAR Brasil Series, where he won the Special Edition ProAM championship in 2023.

== Career ==
=== Stock Car Brazil ===
In 2013, Casagrande ran three stages in Stock Car Brasil for RC3 Bassani and the rest in the Turismo category, finishing in third place overall in the latter. In 2014, Casagrande raced with the C2 Team (formerly Gramacho), with driver Diego Nunes as his teammate. He was also paired with veteran Enrique Bernoldi in the first race of the season.

In 2017, Casagrande went on to compete for the championship for Vogel Motorsport. He won his first career victory in the championship by winning the second race of the Curvelo round, in Minas Gerais. His second victory in the category came in 2019, when he won the first race of the eleventh round in Goiânia.

In 2021, Casagrande won the championship for the first time, winning two races in that season. In the 2023 season, he won the championship once again, winning three races in that season.

=== NASCAR Brasil Sprint Race ===
In the 2023 season, Casagrande paired up with Guilherme Backes in the fifth and sixth rounds, both of which were Special Edition rounds. He won two races in the Special Edition ProAM division and won that championship alongside Backes.

== Racing record ==
=== Racing career summary ===
Season	Series	Team	Races	Wins	Poles	F.Laps	Podiums	Points	Position
2012	Formula 3 Sudamericana	Hitech Racing	2	0	0	0	0	0	10th
2012	Eurocup Formula Renault 2.0	Mark Burdett Motorsport	2	0	0	0	0	0	37th
2012	Formula Renault 2.0 Alps Series	Mark Burdett Motorsport	8	0	0	0	0	2	26th
2012	Formula Renault 2.0 Northern European Cup	Hitech Racing	18	0	1	0	2	181	8th
2013	Stock Car Brasil	RC3 Bassani	3	0	0	0	0	3	33rd
2013	Campeonato Brasileiro de Turismo	Carlos Alves Competições	8	1	0	0	5	146	**3rd**
2013	Brasileiro de Marcas	Carlos Alves Competições	13	0	0	0	2	72	9th
2014	Stock Car Brasil	C2 Team	21	0	0	0	0	71	23rd
2014	Brasileiro de Marcas	C2 Team	13	2	1	1	4	182	4th
2014	United SportsCar Championship - PC	Performance Tech	1	0	0	0	1	1	46th
2015	Stock Car Brasil	C2 Team	21	0	0	0	0	110	16th
2015	Brasileiro de Marcas	C2 Team	15	5	2	0	5	186	6th
2016	Stock Car Brasil	C2 Team	21	0	0	0	0	89	21st
2016	Brasileiro de Marcas	C2 Team	15	2	3	4	6	188	6th
2016	Campeonato Brasileiro de Turismo	C2 Team	3	2	1	1	2	40	14th
2016	Porsche Cup Brasil	N/A	1	0	0	0	0	24	41st
2017	Stock Car Brasil	Vogel Motorsport	22	1	0	2	2	178	10th
2018	Stock Car Brasil	Vogel Motorsport	20	0	0	0	2	155	10th
2019	Stock Car Brasil	Crown Racing	21	1	2	2	7	303	7th
2019	Porsche Cup Brasil	N/A	1	0	0	0	1	94	12th
2020	Stock Car Brasil	R.Mattheis Motorsport	17	1	0	2	4	224	8th
2020	Porsche Cup Brasil	N/A	2	0	0	2	0	66	17th
2021	Stock Car Pro Series	A. Mattheis Vogel	24	2	2	3	14	378	**1st**
2021	Porsche Cup Brasil	N/A	3	0	0	1	0	136	9th
2021	GT Sprint Race Brasil - Pro	N/A	12	1	1	4	3	141	10th
2021	GT Sprint Race Special Edition - Pro	N/A	9	0	1	2	4	116	7th
2022	Stock Car Pro Series	A. Mattheis Vogel	22	2	2	1	3	307	**3rd**
2023	Stock Car Pro Series	A. Mattheis Vogel	24	3	2	2	7	308	**1st**
2023	IMSA SportsCar Championship - GTD Pro	Risi Competizione	1	0	0	0	0	278	24th
2023	NASCAR Brasil Sprint Race - PROAM		3	0	0	0	0	35	12th
2024	Stock Car Pro Series	A. Mattheis Vogel	23	2	1	0	6	926	**1st**
2025	NASCAR Brasil Series	MX Vogel							
2026	Porsche Carrera Cup Brasil								

=== Complete Formula Renault 2.0 NEC results ===
(key) (Races in bold indicate pole position) (Races in italics indicate fastest lap)

Year	Entrant	1	2	3	4	5	6	7	8	9	10	11	12	13	14	15	16	17	18	19	20	DC	Points
2012	Hitech Racing	HOC; 1; 26	HOC; 2; 29	HOC; 3; 15	NÜR; 1	NÜR; 2	OSC; 1; 7	OSC; 2; 13	OSC; 3; 5	ASS; 1; 12	ASS; 2; 12	RBR; 1; 3	RBR; 2; 8	MST; 1; 8	MST; 2; 2	MST; 3; 5	ZAN; 1; 7	ZAN; 2 Ret	ZAN; 3 Ret	SPA; 1; 4	SPA; 2; 19	8th	181

=== Complete Eurocup Formula Renault 2.0 results ===
(key) (Races in bold indicate pole position; races in italics indicate fastest lap)

Year	Entrant	1	2	3	4	5	6	7	8	9	10	11	12	13	14	DC	Points
2012	Mark Burdett Motorsport	ALC; 1	ALC; 2	SPA; 1	SPA; 2	NÜR; 1; 29	NÜR; 2; 15	MSC; 1	MSC; 2	HUN; 1	HUN; 2	LEC; 1	LEC; 2	CAT; 1	CAT; 2	37th	0

=== Complete Formula Renault 2.0 Alps Series results ===
(key) (Races in bold indicate pole position; races in italics indicate fastest lap)

Year	Team	1	2	3	4	5	6	7	8	9	10	11	12	13	14	Pos	Points
2012	Mark Burdett Motorsport	MNZ; 1	MNZ; 2	PAU; 1	PAU; 2	IMO; 1 Ret	IMO; 2 Ret	SPA; 1 Ret	SPA; 2; 9	RBR; 1	RBR; 2	MUG; 1; 18	MUG; 2 Ret	CAT; 1; 25	CAT; 2; 12	26th	2

=== Complete Stock Car Pro Series results ===
(key) (Races in bold indicate pole position) (Races in italics indicate fastest lap)

Year	Team	Car	1	2	3	4	5	6	7	8	9	10	11	12	13	14	15	16	17	18	19	20	21	22	23	24	25	Pos	Points
2013	RC3 Bassani	Peugeot 408	INT	CUR	TAR	SAL	BRA	CAS	RBP	CAS; 18	VEL; 22	CUR; Ret	BRA	INT														33rd	3
2014	C2 Team	Chevrolet Sonic	INT; 1; 19	SCZ; 1 Ret	SCZ; 2; 8	BRA; 1 Ret	BRA; 2 DNS	GOI; 1; 22	GOI; 2; 24	GOI; 1; 18	CAS; 1; 5	CAS; 2 Ret	CUR; 1; 19	CUR; 2; 10	VEL; 1; 16	VEL; 2; 17	SCZ; 1; 14	SCZ; 2 Ret	TAR; 1; 11	TAR; 2 DNS	SAL; 1; 11	SAL; 2; 8	CUR; 1 Ret					23rd	71
2015	C2 Team	Chevrolet Sonic	GOI; 1; 20	RBP; 2 DSQ	RBP; 2; 10	VEL; 1 Ret	VEL; 2; 7	CUR; 1; 13	CUR; 2; 23	SCZ; 1; 9	SCZ; 2; 7	CUR; 1 Ret	CUR; 2; 7	GOI; 1; 24	CAS; 1; 22	CAS; 2 DNS	MOU; 1; 18	MOU; 2; 14	CUR; 1; 8	CUR; 2 Ret	TAR; 1; 11	TAR; 2 Ret	INT; 1; 4					16th	110
2016	C2 Team	Chevrolet Cruze	CUR; 1 Ret	VEL; 1; 16	VEL; 2; 18	GOI; 1 Ret	GOI; 2 DNS	SCZ; 1; 7	SCZ; 2; 14	TAR; 1; 15	TAR; 2; 4	CAS; 1 Ret	CAS; 2 Ret	INT; 1; 9	LON; 1 Ret	LON; 2 Ret	CUR; 1 Ret	CUR; 2; 10	GOI; 1; 17	GOI; 2 Ret	CRI; 1; 8	CRI; 2; 17	INT; 1 Ret					21st	89
2017	Vogel Motorsport	Chevrolet Cruze	GOI; 1 Ret	GOI; 2; 22	VEL; 1; 9	VEL; 2; 13	SCZ; 1; 16	SCZ; 2; 21	CAS; 1; 20	CAS; 2 Ret	CUR; 1; 9	CRI; 1; 10	CRI; 2; 1	VCA; 1; 9	VCA; 2; 3	LON; 1; 9	LON; 2; 5	ARG; 1; 9	ARG; 2; 7	TAR; 1; 24	TAR; 2; 5	GOI; 1; 10	GOI; 2; 6	INT; 1; 18				10th	184
2018	Vogel Motorsport	Chevrolet Cruze	INT; 1 Ret	CUR; 1; 4	CUR; 2; 3	VEL; 1; 7	VEL; 2; 12	LON; 1; 14	LON; 2; 12	SCZ; 1; 15	SCZ; 2 Ret	GOI; 1 DSQ	MOU; 1; 8	MOU; 2 DSQ	CAS; 1; 5	CAS; 2 DSQ	VCA; 1 Ret	VCA; 2 Ret	TAR; 1 Ret	TAR; 2; 9	GOI; 1; 4	GOI; 2; 5	INT; 1; 3					10th	155
2019	Crown Racing	Chevrolet Cruze	VEL; 1; 9	VCA; 1; 4	VCA; 2; 3	GOI; 1; 20	GOI; 2; 5	LON; 1; 22	LON; 2; 11	SCZ; 1 Ret	SCZ; 2 Ret	MOU; 1; 17	MOU; 2; 3	INT; 1; 2	VEL; 1; 2	VEL; 2 Ret	CAS; 1; 2	CAS; 2; 7	VCA; 1; 2	VCA; 2; 15	GOI; 1; 1	GOI; 2; 9	INT; 1; 4					7th	303
2020	RMattheis Motorsport	Chevrolet Cruze	GOI; 1 Ret	GOI; 2 Ret	INT; 1; 6	INT; 2 Ret	LON; 1; 2	LON; 2; 4	CAS; 1 Ret	CAS; 2; 6	CAS; 3; 3	VCA; 1; 2	VCA; 2; 7	CUR; 1; 14	CUR; 2; 10	CUR; 3; 1	GOI; 1; 5	GOI; 2; 4	GOI; 3; 8	INT; 1 WD								8th	224
2021	AMattheis Vogel	Chevrolet Cruze	GOI; 1; 17	GOI; 2; 3	**INT**; **1**; 1	INT; 2 Ret	VCA; 1; 1	VCA; 2 Ret	VCA; 1; 3	VCA; 2; 13	CAS; 1; 3	CAS; 2; 3	CUR; 1; 3	CUR; 2; 11	CUR; 1; 3	CUR; 2; 2	GOI; 1; 3	GOI; 2; 18	GOI; 1; 14	GOI; 2; 3	VCA; 1; 10	VCA; 2; 2	SCZ; 1; 4	SCZ; 2; 6	**INT**; **1**; 3	INT; 2; 3		1st	378
2022	AMattheis Vogel	Chevrolet Cruze	**INT**; **1**; 1	GOI; 1; 5	GOI; 2; 16	RIO; 1; 4	RIO; 2; 5	VCA; 1; 4	VCA; 2; 10	**VEL**; **1**; 1	VEL; 2; 8	VEL; 1 Ret	VEL; 2 DNS	INT; 1; 4	INT; 2; 7	SCZ; 1; 9	SCZ; 2; 17	VCA; 1; 4	VCA; 2; 3	GOI; 1; 26	GOI; 2; 12	GOI; 1; 9	GOI; 2; 9	BRA; 1; 4	BRA; 2 DSQ			3rd	307
2023	AMattheis Vogel	Chevrolet Cruze	GOI; 1; 4	GOI; 2; 24	**INT**; **1**; 1	INT; 2; 6	TAR; 1; 3	TAR; 2; 12	CAS; 1; 3	CAS; 2; 5	INT; 1; 23	INT; 2; 22	VCA; 1; 18	VCA; 2; 2	GOI; 1; 7	GOI; 2; 22	**VEL**; **1**; 1	VEL; 2; 7	BUE; 1; 1	BUE; 2; 19	VCA; 1; 4	VCA; 2; 10	CAS; 1; 18	CAS; 2; 17	INT; 1; 3	INT; 2; 21		1st	308
2024	AMattheis Vogel	Chevrolet Cruze	GOI1; 1; 4	GOI1; 2; 3	MGG1; 1; 18	MGG1; 2 C	INT1; 1 Ret	INT1; 2; 13	CSC; 1; 6	CSC; 2; 7	MGG2; 1; 15	MGG2; 2 Ret	MGG3; 2; 4	GOI2; 1; 25†	**GOI2**; **2**; 1	BLH; 1; 16	BLH; 2; 13	VEL; 1; 3	VEL; 2; 11	BUA; 1; 7	BUA; 2; 1	ELP; 1; 7	ELP; 2; 3	GOI3; 1; 12	GOI3; 2; 15	INT2; 1; 4	INT2; 2; 3	1st	926

^{*} Season still in progress.

=== Complete IMSA SportsCar Championship results ===
(key) (Races in bold indicate pole position) (Races in italics indicate fastest lap)

Year	Team	Class	Make	Engine	1	2	3	4	5	6	7	8	9	10	11	Pos.	Points
2023	Risi Competizione	GTD Pro	Ferrari 296 GT3	Ferrari F163 3.0 L Turbo V6	DAY	SEB; 6	LBH	LGA	WGL	MOS	LIM	ELK	VIR	IMS	PET	24th	278

=== ARCA Menards Series ===
(key) (Bold – Pole position awarded by qualifying time. Italics – Pole position earned by points standings or practice time. * – Most laps led.)

ARCA Menards Series results
Year	Team	No.	Make	1	2	3	4	5	6	7	8	9	10	11	12	13	14	15	16	17	18	19	20	AMSC	Pts	Ref
2026	MCM Racing Development	38	Toyota	DAY	PHO	KAN	TAL	GLN	TOL	MCH	POC	BER	ELK	CHI	LRP	IRP	IOW	ISF	MAD	DSF	SLM	BRI; 15	KAN	108th	29	

==== ARCA Menards Series East ====
ARCA Menards Series East results
Year	Team	No.	Make	1	2	3	4	5	6	7	8	AMSEC	Pts	Ref
2026	MCM Racing Development	38	Toyota	HCY	CAR	NSV	TOL	IRP	FRS	IOW	BRI; 15	58th	29	
