= 2022 Stock Car Pro Series =

Brazilian stock car racing series

Champions
- Drivers' champion: Rubens Barrichello

Seasons
- ← 2021 2023 →

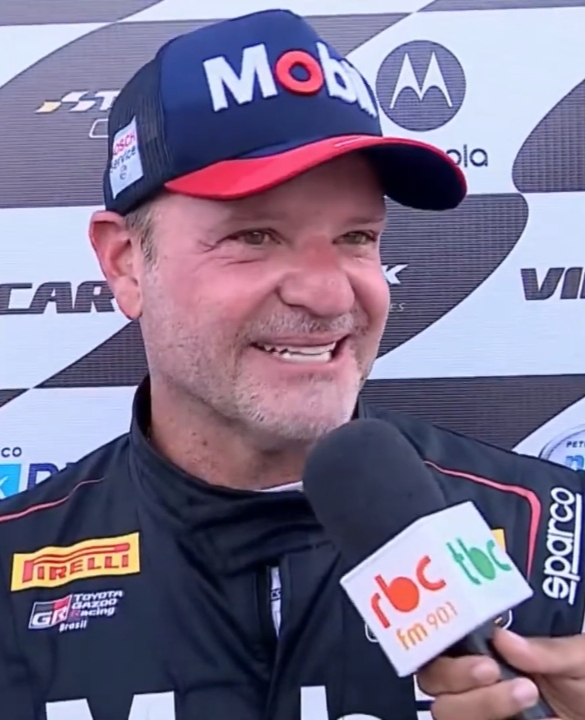
Rubens Barrichello won the 2022 championship

The 2022 Stock Car Pro Series was the forty-fourth season of the Brazilian car racing series previously called Stock Car Brasil. It marked the return of Corrida de Duplas and the first race in an airport in stock car history. The season started on February 13 and ended on December 11 with the Super Final BRB, both at Interlagos Circuit.

== Calendar ==
The season started on 13 February and ended on 11 December, both at Interlagos Circuit.

Round	Event	Circuit	Date	Map
1	5ª Corrida de Duplas 2022	Autódromo José Carlos Pace, São Paulo	13 February	2022 Stock Car Pro Series is located in Brazil
2		Autódromo Internacional Ayrton Senna (External Circuit); Goiânia, Goiás	20 March	2022 Stock Car Pro Series is located in Brazil
3	GP do Galeão	(Rio de Janeiro (state)) Circuito Cacá Bueno; Rio de Janeiro, Rio de Janeiro	10 April	2022 Stock Car Pro Series is located in Brazil
4		(São Paulo (state)) Autódromo Velo Città; Mogi Guaçu, São Paulo	15 May	2022 Stock Car Pro Series is located in Brazil
5		Velopark; Nova Santa Rita, Rio Grande do Sul	2 July	2022 Stock Car Pro Series is located in Brazil
6		Velopark; Nova Santa Rita, Rio Grande do Sul	3 July	2022 Stock Car Pro Series is located in Brazil
7		(São Paulo (state)) Autódromo José Carlos Pace; São Paulo, São Paulo	31 July	2022 Stock Car Pro Series is located in Brazil
8		(São Paulo (state)) Autódromo Velo Città; Mogi Guaçu, São Paulo	4 September	2022 Stock Car Pro Series is located in Brazil
9		Autódromo Internacional de Santa Cruz do Sul; Santa Cruz do Sul, Rio Grande do Sul	25 September	2022 Stock Car Pro Series is located in Brazil
10		Autódromo Internacional Ayrton Senna (Mixed Circuit); Goiânia, Goiás	22 October	2022 Stock Car Pro Series is located in Brazil
11		Autódromo Internacional Ayrton Senna (Mixed Circuit); Goiânia, Goiás	23 October	2022 Stock Car Pro Series is located in Brazil
12	Super Final BRB	(São Paulo (state)) Autódromo José Carlos Pace; São Paulo, São Paulo	11 December	2022 Stock Car Pro Series is located in Brazil

== Teams and drivers ==
Championship entries					Corrida de Duplas entries
Team	Car	No.	Drivers	Rounds	Co-driver name
Crown Racing	Chevrolet Cruze Stock Car	0	(Brazil) Cacá Bueno	All	(Brazil) Felipe Fraga
Crown Racing	Chevrolet Cruze Stock Car	3	(Brazil) Rodrigo Baptista	All	(Belgium) Maxime Soulet
BRB Crown	Chevrolet Cruze Stock Car	43	(Brazil) Pedro Cardoso	All	(Brazil) Renato Braga
Lubrax Podium	Chevrolet Cruze Stock Car	4	(Brazil) Júlio Campos	All	(Brazil) Marçal Müller
Lubrax Podium	Chevrolet Cruze Stock Car	19	(Brazil) Felipe Massa	All	(Germany) Timo Glock
Cavaleiro Sports	Chevrolet Cruze Stock Car	5	(Brazil) Denis Navarro	All	(Argentina) Franco Girolami
Cavaleiro Sports	Chevrolet Cruze Stock Car	80	(Brazil) Marcos Gomes	All	(Brazil) Beto Cavaleiro
Full Time Bassani	Toyota Corolla Stock Car	6	(Brazil) Tony Kanaan	All	(Brazil) Pietro Fittipaldi
Full Time Bassani	Toyota Corolla Stock Car	8	(Brazil) Rafael Suzuki	All	(Netherlands) Jeroen Bleekemolen
Full Time Sports	Toyota Corolla Stock Car	68	(Argentina) Julian Santero	8	—N/a
Full Time Sports	Toyota Corolla Stock Car	100	(Argentina) Diego Azar	10–11	—N/a
Full Time Sports	Toyota Corolla Stock Car	101	(Brazil) Gianluca Petecof	1–6, 12	(Brazil) Arthur Leist
Full Time Sports	Toyota Corolla Stock Car	111	(Brazil) Rubens Barrichello	All	(Brazil) Eduardo Barrichello
Full Time Sports	Toyota Corolla Stock Car	122	(Argentina) Andrés Jakos	7, 9	—N/a
RKL Competições	Chevrolet Cruze Stock Car	7	(Brazil) Thiago Vivacqua	3, 7, 12	—N/a
RKL Competições	Chevrolet Cruze Stock Car	34	(Brazil) Gabriel Robe	5–6	—N/a
RKL Competições	Chevrolet Cruze Stock Car	37	(Brazil) Raphael Teixeira	10–11	—N/a
RKL Competições	Chevrolet Cruze Stock Car	55	(Brazil) Renato Braga	2–4, 10–11	—N/a
RKL Competições	Chevrolet Cruze Stock Car	86	(Brazil) Gustavo Frigotto	1–2, 4–6	(Brazil) Fábio Fogaça
RCM Motorsport	Toyota Corolla Stock Car	10	(Brazil) Ricardo Zonta	All	(Brazil) Danilo Dirani
RCM Motorsport	Toyota Corolla Stock Car	44	(Brazil) Bruno Baptista	All	(Brazil) Alan Hellmeister
KTF Sports	Chevrolet Cruze Stock Car	11	(Brazil) Gaetano di Mauro	All	(Brazil) Gabriel Bortoleto
KTF Sports	Chevrolet Cruze Stock Car	12	(Brazil) Lucas Foresti	All	(Brazil) Pietro Rimbano
KTF Racing	Chevrolet Cruze Stock Car	85	(Brazil) Guilherme Salas	All	(Brazil) Raphael Reis
KTF Racing	Chevrolet Cruze Stock Car	121	(Brazil) Felipe Baptista	All	(Brazil) Vitor Baptista
Blau Motorsport	Chevrolet Cruze Stock Car	18	(Brazil) Allam Khodair	All	(Spain) Albert Costa Balboa
Blau Motorsport	Chevrolet Cruze Stock Car	70	(Brazil) Diego Nunes	All	(Spain) Fran Rueda
Ipiranga Racing	Toyota Corolla Stock Car	21	(Brazil) Thiago Camilo	All	(Brazil) Dennis Dirani
Ipiranga Racing	Toyota Corolla Stock Car	30	(Brazil) César Ramos	All	(Brazil) Felipe Drugovich
Hot Car Competições	Chevrolet Cruze Stock Car	22	(Brazil) André Moraes Jr.	2	—N/a
Hot Car Competições	Chevrolet Cruze Stock Car	54	(Brazil) Tuca Antoniazi	1, 3–12	(Brazil) André Moraes Jr.
Hot Car Competições	Chevrolet Cruze Stock Car	110	(Brazil) Felipe Lapenna	All	(Brazil) Sergio Ramalho
Shell V-Power	Chevrolet Cruze Stock Car	28	(Brazil) Galid Osman	All	(Brazil) Enzo Elias
Shell V-Power	Chevrolet Cruze Stock Car	51	(Brazil) Átila Abreu	All	(Brazil) Renan Guerra
Eurofarma RC	Chevrolet Cruze Stock Car	29	(Brazil) Daniel Serra	1–6, 8–12	(Brazil) Augusto Farfus
Eurofarma RC	Chevrolet Cruze Stock Car	74	(Brazil) Felipe Fraga	7	—N/a
Eurofarma RC	Chevrolet Cruze Stock Car	90	(Brazil) Ricardo Maurício	All	(Portugal) Filipe Albuquerque
Motul TMG Racing	Toyota Corolla Stock Car	33	(Brazil) Nelson Piquet Jr.	All	(Brazil) Pedro Piquet
Scuderia Chiarelli	Toyota Corolla Stock Car	73	(Brazil) Sérgio Jimenez	All	(Brazil) Zezinho Muggiati
Scuderia Chiarelli	Toyota Corolla Stock Car	88	(Brazil) Beto Monteiro	1–3, 5–6	(Brazil) Kiko Porto
A.Mattheis Vogel	Chevrolet Cruze Stock Car	83	(Brazil) Gabriel Casagrande	All	(Brazil) Gabriel Robe
A.Mattheis Vogel	Toyota Corolla Stock Car	117	(Argentina) Matías Rossi	2–12	—N/a

=== Team changes ===
The field expanded from 32 to 34 cars. Both Crown Racing and RKL Competições added one more car.

Blau Motorsport/TMG Racing and A.Mattheis Vogel Motorsport replace their previous Cruze model with a Toyota Corolla.

After dropping out of the 2021 championship at mid-season, MX Piquet Sports did not return. After taking command of the team last season, Scuderia CJ is still in the championship.

=== Driver Changes ===
Nelson Piquet Jr. moved to TMG Racing to replace Christian Hahn, having raced some events with his own team in 2021. After his debut in 2021, Hahn did not return this season.

2021 GT4 Endurance Brasil champion Andre Moraes Junior made his debut with Hot Car New Generation at selected events replacing Tuca Antoniazi due to personal commitments.

Rodrigo Baptista made his debut in the series with Crown Racing replacing Beto Monteiro who moved to Scuderia CJ.

2021 Stock Light champion Felipe Baptista made his debut with KTF Sports. Pedro Cardoso, who competed with Stock Light last season moved to Crown Racing.

Matias Rossi left Full Time Sports to replace Guga Lima at A. Mattheis Vogel Motorsport. He was replaced by Gianluca Petecof who competed in selected events.

=== Mid-season changes ===
Due a conflict with Turismo Carretera first round, Matias Rossi did not compete at Corrida de Duplas. He was not replaced and returned starting with the second round.

RKL Competições started the season with only one car, initially the team was planned with two cars after the expand of the field. At second round Renato Braga, that competed as wildcard at first round entered on second car. Thiago Vivaquca debuted in the series replacing Gustavo Frigotto at third round.

Andre Moraes Jr. replaced Tuca Antoniazzi at second round.

== Results and standings ==
=== Results summary ===
Round		Circuit	Date	Pole position	Fastest lap	Winning driver	Winning team
1	R1	Autódromo José Carlos Pace, São Paulo (5ª Corrida de Duplas 2022)	13 February	(Brazil) Gabriel Casagrande	(Brazil) Gabriel Casagrande	(Brazil) Gabriel Casagrande	AMattheis Vogel
1	WR	Autódromo José Carlos Pace, São Paulo (5ª Corrida de Duplas 2022)	13 February		(Spain) Albert Costa	(Brazil) Enzo Elias	Shell V-Power
2	R1	Autódromo Internacional Ayrton Senna, Goiânia (External Circuit)	20 March	(Brazil) Rubens Barrichello	(Brazil) Rubens Barrichello	(Brazil) Rubens Barrichello	Full Time Sports
2	R2	Autódromo Internacional Ayrton Senna, Goiânia (External Circuit)	20 March		(Brazil) Denis Navarro	(Brazil) Rubens Barrichello	Full Time Sports
3	R1	Circuito Cacá Bueno, Rio de Janeiro (GP do Galeão)	10 April	(Brazil) Daniel Serra	(Brazil) Daniel Serra	(Brazil) Daniel Serra	Eurofarma RC
3	R2	Circuito Cacá Bueno, Rio de Janeiro (GP do Galeão)	10 April		(Brazil) Ricardo Mauricio	(Brazil) Ricardo Mauricio	Eurofarma RC
4	R1	Autódromo Velo Città, Mogi Guaçu	15 May	(Brazil) Ricardo Zonta	(Brazil) Ricardo Zonta	(Brazil) Ricardo Zonta	RCM Motorsport
4	R2	Autódromo Velo Città, Mogi Guaçu	15 May		(Brazil) Cesar Ramos	(Argentina) Matias Rossi	AMattheis Vogel
5	R1	Velopark, Nova Santa Rita	2 July	(Brazil) Gabriel Casagrande	(Brazil) Allam Khodair	(Brazil) Gabriel Casagrande	AMattheis Vogel
5	R2	Velopark, Nova Santa Rita	2 July		(Brazil) Marcos Gomes	(Brazil) Nelson Piquet Jr.	Motul TMG Racing
6	R1	Velopark, Nova Santa Rita	3 July	(Brazil) Marcos Gomes	(Brazil) Cesar Ramos	(Brazil) Gaetano di Mauro	KTF Sports
6	R2	Velopark, Nova Santa Rita	3 July		(Argentina) Matias Rossi	(Brazil) Bruno Baptista	RCM Motorsport
7	R1	Autódromo José Carlos Pace, São Paulo	31 July	(Brazil) Felipe Lapenna	(Brazil) Felipe Baptista	(Argentina) Matias Rossi	AMattheis Vogel
7	R2	Autódromo José Carlos Pace, São Paulo	31 July		(Brazil) Ricardo Zonta	(Brazil) Felipe Fraga	Eurofarma RC
8	R1	Autódromo Velo Città, Mogi Guaçu	4 September	(Brazil) Bruno Baptista	(Brazil) Ricardo Zonta	(Brazil) Felipe Lapenna	Hot Car Competições
8	R2	Autódromo Velo Città, Mogi Guaçu	4 September		(Brazil) Ricardo Mauricio	(Brazil) Ricardo Mauricio	Eurofarma RC
9	R1	Autódromo Internacional de Santa Cruz do Sul, Santa Cruz do Sul	25 September	(Brazil) Ricardo Mauricio	(Brazil) Ricardo Mauricio	(Brazil) Ricardo Mauricio	Eurofarma RC
9	R2	Autódromo Internacional de Santa Cruz do Sul, Santa Cruz do Sul	25 September		(Brazil) Ricardo Zonta	(Brazil) Rubens Barrichello	Full Time Sports
10	R1	Autódromo Internacional Ayrton Senna, Goiânia (Mixed Circuit)	22 October	(Brazil) Cesar Ramos	(Brazil) Cesar Ramos	(Brazil) Cesar Ramos	Ipiranga Racing
10	R2	Autódromo Internacional Ayrton Senna, Goiânia (Mixed Circuit)	22 October		(Brazil) Ricardo Mauricio	(Brazil) Nelson Piquet Jr.	Motul TMG Racing
11	R1	Autódromo Internacional Ayrton Senna, Goiânia (Mixed Circuit)	23 October	(Brazil) Ricardo Mauricio	(Brazil) Ricardo Mauricio	(Brazil) Ricardo Mauricio	Eurofarma RC
11	R2	Autódromo Internacional Ayrton Senna, Goiânia (Mixed Circuit)	23 October		(Brazil) Guilherme Salas	(Brazil) Diego Nunes	Blau Motorsport
12	R1	Autódromo José Carlos Pace, São Paulo (Super Final BRB)	11 December	(Brazil) Felipe Baptista	(Argentina) Matias Rossi	(Brazil) Felipe Baptista	KTF Racing
12	R2	Autódromo José Carlos Pace, São Paulo (Super Final BRB)	11 December		(Brazil) Diego Nunes	(Brazil) Ricardo Mauricio	Eurofarma RC

=== Championship standings ===
Points system

Points are awarded for each race at an event to the driver/s of a car that completed at least 75% of the race distance and was running at the completion of the race. Before the last round, the four worst results are discarded. Races in which a driver has been disqualified cannot be discarded. The second race of each event is held with partially reversed top ten grid.

Points format	Position																				
Points format	1st	2nd	3rd	4th	5th	6th	7th	8th	9th	10th	11th	12th	13th	14th	15th	16th	17th	18th	19th	20th	Pole
Race 1	30	26	22	19	17	15	14	13	12	11	10	9	8	7	6	5	4	3	2	1	2
Race 2	24	20	18	17	16	15	14	13	12	11	10	9	8	7	6	5	4	3	2	1	
Wildcard race	12	11	10	9	8	7	6	5	4	3	2	1	0								

Drivers' Championship

Pos	Driver	INT1^{1}	GYN1		RIO		MOG1		VLP1		VLP2		INT2		MOG2		SCZ		GYN2		GYN3		INT3		Pts
1	(Brazil) Rubens Barrichello	Ret	**1**	1	Ret	DNS	2	2	6	4	14	10	13	22	8	5	2	1	7	6	5	8	3	11	330
2	(Brazil) Daniel Serra	3^{3}	16	4	**1**	8	6	8	4	12	4	11			(16)	7	3	5	5	8	10	3	2	Ret	316 (321)
3	(Brazil) Gabriel Casagrande	**1**^{4}	5	16	4	5	4	10	**1**	8	Ret	DNS	4	7	9	(17)	4	3	26	12	9	9	4	DSQ	307 (311)
4	(Argentina) Matias Rossi		28	Ret	2	Ret	9	1	8	2	3	2	1	17	5	8	6	2	9	11	11	Ret	Ret	Ret	268
5	(Brazil) Ricardo Zonta	5^{7}	(20)	13	18	Ret	**1**	25	2	11	DSQ	Ret	15	3	6	2	7	18	2	2	12	17	13	4	262 (263)
6	(Brazil) Ricardo Mauricio	27	13	2	3	1	DSQ	DSQ	11	23	DSQ	Ret	Ret	DNS	19	1	**1**	6	3	18	**1**	13	10	1	257
7	(Brazil) Bruno Baptista	21^{12}	7	8	14	2	10	3	14	Ret	6	1	7	Ret	**2**	18	5	Ret	10	3	Ret	10	15	7	252
8	(Brazil) Nelson Piquet Jr.	17	8	Ret	11	14	7	9	10	1	Ret	9	24	4	12	6	Ret	DNS	8	1	8	7	22	2	232
9	(Brazil) César Ramos	12	2	10	5	Ret	Ret	DNS	3	15	2	13	12	21	17	Ret	Ret	DNS	**1**	16	3	Ret	8	3	230
10	(Brazil) Thiago Camilo	2^{8}	6	5	8	18	27	Ret	12	Ret	17	19	5	2	3	11	18	DSQ	6	13	2	Ret	Ret	19	216
11	(Brazil) Gaetano di Mauro	6	9	7	Ret	3	13	6	17	7	1	4	Ret	18	28	3	22	13	22	22	19	2	23	20	199
12	(Brazil) Guilherme Salas	15	24	14	7	7	5	13	9	3	18	6	3	Ret	Ret	Ret	24	Ret	14	17	24	4	11	8	187
13	(Brazil) Rafael Suzuki	9^{6}	4	Ret	9	Ret	16	17	7	5	7	7	23	19	26	Ret	10	10	11	20	Ret	14	12	17	172
14	(Brazil) Atila Abreu	11	19	6	6	16	11	Ret	16	19	21	Ret	10	16	23	4	Ret	DNS	Ret	4	4	11	7	5	169
15	(Brazil) Galid Osman	8^{1}	18	Ret	Ret	Ret	25	10	21	Ret	8	5	25	11	29	22	20	7	4	5	6	5	16	18	166
16	(Brazil) Diego Nunes	Ret	15	3	Ret	DNS	8	6	15	18	Ret	16	6	Ret	10	15	15	16	19	Ret	17	1	18	6	158
17	(Brazil) Júlio Campos	7^{9}	3	Ret	24	23	12	Ret	5	27	15	21	26	5	27	13	16	4	25	7	Ret	6	20	Ret	148
18	(Brazil) Allam Khodair	10^{2}	Ret	Ret	17	9	14	Ret	13	6	Ret	DNS	9	9	4	16	Ret	20	21	10	18	24	5	Ret	148
19	(Brazil) Felipe Lapenna	16	Ret	DNS	20	20	3	14	29	Ret	5	20	**2**	14	1	Ret	21	12	20	19	Ret	18	9	Ret	146
20	(Brazil) Felipe Baptista	14	22	17	10	**11**	18	Ret	Ret	14	24	Ret	18	6	11	Ret	Ret	Ret	Ret	9	23	Ret	**1**	9	126
21	(Brazil) Marcos Gomes	4	12	Ret	13	6	Ret	DNS	Ret	9	**Ret**	DNS	16	20	22	10	14	19	15	23	7	12	17	Ret	124
22	(Brazil) Tony Kanaan	20^{5}	11	12	22	16	21	4	25	17	20	DSQ	17	10	30	14	23	15	30	15	25	16	21	13	102
23	(Brazil) Cacá Bueno	23^{11}	25	11	23	15	15	16	23	10	10	15	Ret	12	17	Ret	9	Ret	28	Ret	26	20	14	10	100
24	(Brazil) Felipe Massa	26	21	15	6	22	17	12	20	16	Ret	DNS	8	8	21	19	Ret	17	24	Ret	Ret	15	6	16	98
25	(Brazil) Sergio Jimenez	Ret	14	9	26	Ret	24	7	19	26	11	8	Ret	26	15	Ret	11	9	17	24	15	Ret	Ret	Ret	96
26	(Brazil) Pedro Cardoso	13	17	18	21	13	20	21	22	25	Ret	23	Ret	DNS	7	12	8	Ret	12	14	13	22	26	12	93
27	(Brazil) Denis Navarro	28	10	**19**	12	12	28	22	27	Ret	13	3	21	13	20	Ret	17	Ret	18	Ret	16	19	25	15	86
28	(Brazil) Lucas Foresti	24^{10}	26	21	25	Ret	Ret	15	26	20	9	DNS	11	15	13	20	13	8	16	21	22	Ret	19	Ret	75
29	(Brazil) Rodrigo Baptista	18	27	20	19	17	Ret	18	18	21	22	18	DSQ	DSQ	24	21	25	11	13	Ret	14	23	24	Ret	44
30	(Brazil) Gianluca Petecof	22	30	Ret	15	4	19	26	Ret	13	16	17											Ret	DNS	42
31	(Brazil) Felipe Fraga (Note: Fraga was ineligible to score points at first round as he competed as a wildcard driver.)	11											20	1											25
32	(Argentina) Andrés Jakos												14	24			12	14							23
33	(Argentina) Julian Santero														14	9									19
34	(Brazil) Tuca Antoniazzi	Ret			27	21	22	24	30	24	12	22	22	25	25	Ret	19	21	23	Ret	21	Ret	Ret	14	18
35	(Brazil) Gabriel Robe (Note: Robe was ineligible to score points at first round as he competed as a wildcard driver.)	4							24	Ret	19	12													11
36	(Brazil) Beto Monteiro	25	Ret	DNS	Ret	DNS			Ret	22	23	14													7
37	(Brazil) Thiago Vivacqua				27	19							19	23									Ret	DNS	4
38	(Brazil) Gustavo Frigotto	19	24	Ret			26	20	28	DNS	Ret	24													3
39	(Argentina) Diego Azar																		29	Ret	20	21			1
40	(Brazil) Renato Braga (Note: Braga was ineligible to score points at first round as he competed as a wildcard driver.)	Ret	29	DSQ	Ret	DNS	23	23											Ret	Ret	Ret	25			0
41	(Brazil) Raphael Teixeira																		27	Ret	27	26			0
42	(Brazil) André Moraes Jr. (Note: Moraes Jr. was ineligible to score points at first round as he competed as a wildcard driver.)	Ret	Ret	DNS																					0
Drivers ineligible to score points
	(Brazil) Enzo Elias	1																							
	(Spain) Albert Costa	**2**																							
	(Brazil) Augusto Farfus	3																							
	(Brazil) Pietro Fittipaldi	5																							
	(Netherlands) Jeroen Bleekemolen	6																							
	(Brazil) Danilo Dirani	7																							
	(Brazil) Dennis Dirani	8																							
	(Brazil) Marçal Müller	9																							
	(Brazil) Pietro Rimbano	10																							
	(Brazil) Alan Hellmeister	12																							
	(Brazil) Renan Guerra	13																							
	(Brazil) Arthur Leist	14																							
	(Portugal) Filipe Albuquerque	15																							
	(Brazil) Zezinho Muggiati	16																							
	(Belgium) Maxime Soulet	17																							
	(Brazil) Fábio Fogaça	18																							
	(Brazil) Pedro Piquet	19																							
	(Spain) Fran Rueda	20																							
	(Argentina) Franco Girolami	21																							
	(Brazil) Gabriel Bortoleto	22																							
	(Brazil) Sergio Ramalho	23																							
	(Brazil) Vitor Baptista	24																							
	(Brazil) Raphael Reis	25																							
	(Brazil) Kiko Porto	26																							
	(Brazil) Eduardo Barrichello	Ret																							
	(Brazil) Beto Cavaleiro	Ret																							
	(Brazil) Felipe Drugovich	Ret																							
	(Germany) Timo Glock	DNS																							
Pos	Driver	INT1	GYN1		RIO		MOG1		VLP1		VLP2		INT2		MOG2		SCZ		GYN2		GYN3		INT3		Pts

Colour	Result
Gold	Winner
Silver	Second place
Bronze	Third place
Green	Points classification
Blue	Non-points classification
Blue	Non-classified finish (NC)
Purple	Retired, not classified (Ret)
Red	Did not qualify (DNQ)
Red	Did not pre-qualify (DNPQ)
Black	Disqualified (DSQ)
White	Did not start (DNS)
White	Withdrew (WD)
White	Race cancelled (C)
Blank	Did not practice (DNP)
Blank	Did not arrive (DNA)
Blank	Excluded (EX)

**Bold** – Pole position
Italics – Fastest lap
† – Retired, but classified Notes:
^{1 2 3 4 5 6 7 8 9 10 11 12} – refers to wildcard drivers race position.

^{1} 5ª Corrida de Duplas 2022 was held in two races, with the first race only with the championship entries and the second only to the wildcard drivers. The grid of wildcard race was defined by the top 10 reverse grid of first race. The final position of wildcard race worth points for the championship entries only. Gabriel Casagrande and Gabriel Robe who earned the most points were declared the winners.

Manufacturers' championship

Only points scored by the qualifying and the top two drivers of a manufacturer in races count for the manufacturers' championship.

#	Constructor	INT1			GYN1			RIO			MOG1			VLP1			VLP2			INT2			MOG2			SCZ			GYN2			GYN3			INT3			Points
#	Constructor	Q	R1	WR	Q	R1	R2	Q	R1	R2	Q	R1	R2	Q	C1	C2	Q	R1	R2	Q	R1	R2	Q	R1	R2	Q	R1	R2	Q	R1	R2	Q	R1	R2	Q	R1	R2	Points
1	(Japan) Toyota	0	43	15	2	56	40	0	43	47	2	56	44	0	48	44	0	48	44	0	47	38	2	48	36	0	43	44										780
2	(United States) Chevrolet	2	52	53	0	39	38	2	52	42	0	41	31	2	49	33	2	49	35	2	48	40	0	49	42	2	52	35										762
#	Constructor	INT1			GYN1			RIO			MOG1			VLP1			VLP2			INT2			MOG2			SCZ			GYN2			GYN3			INT3			

== Broadcasting ==
TV (Brazil only)	Internet (Global)
Band	YouTube
SportTV	Motorsport.tv
TV (Russia only)	Facebook
Моторспорт ТВ	Zoome
	Catve.com
	Auto Videos
	Twitch
