= 2023 Stock Car Pro Series =

Season of stock car racing

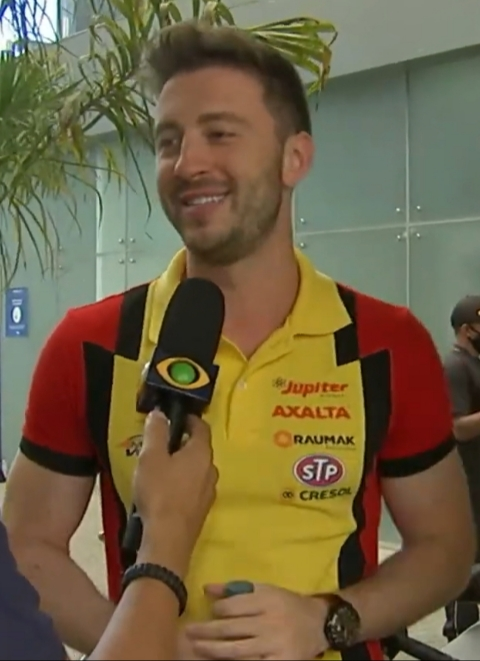
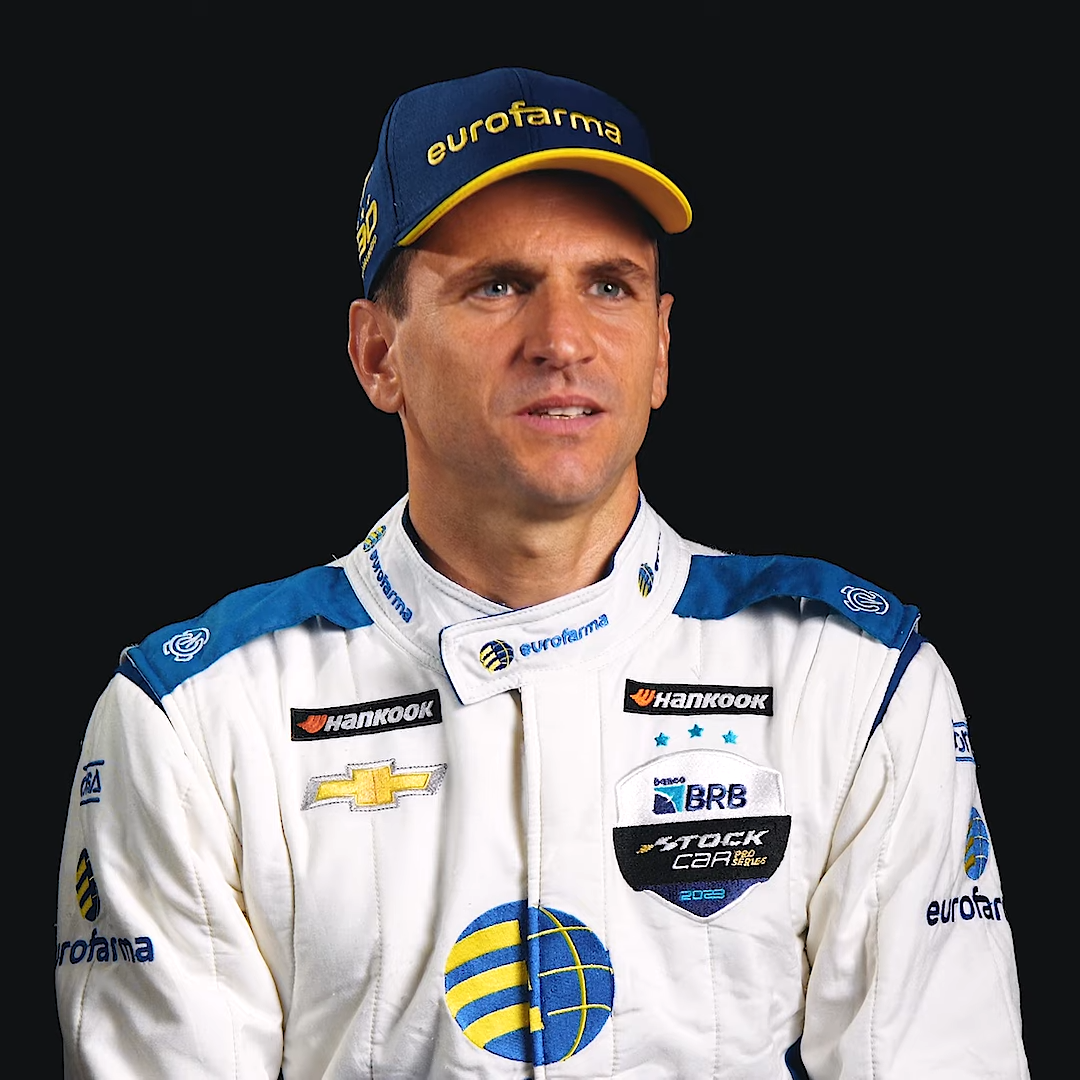
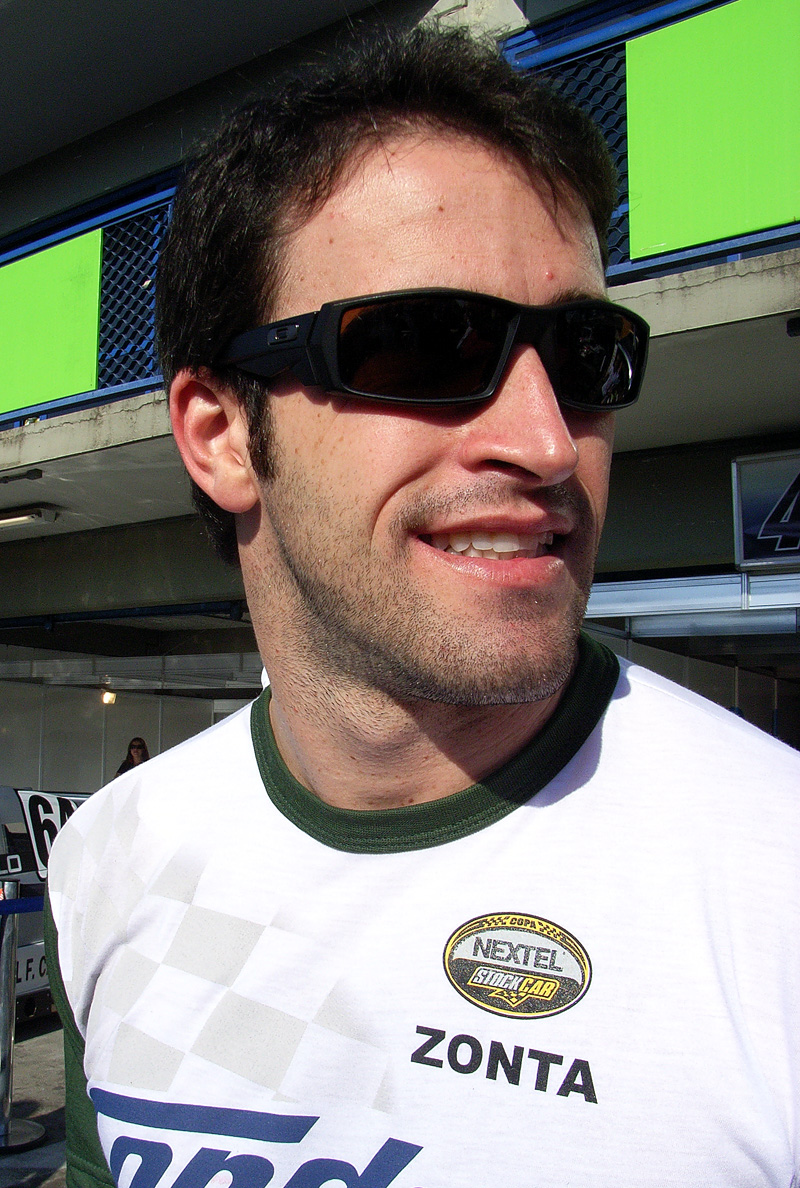
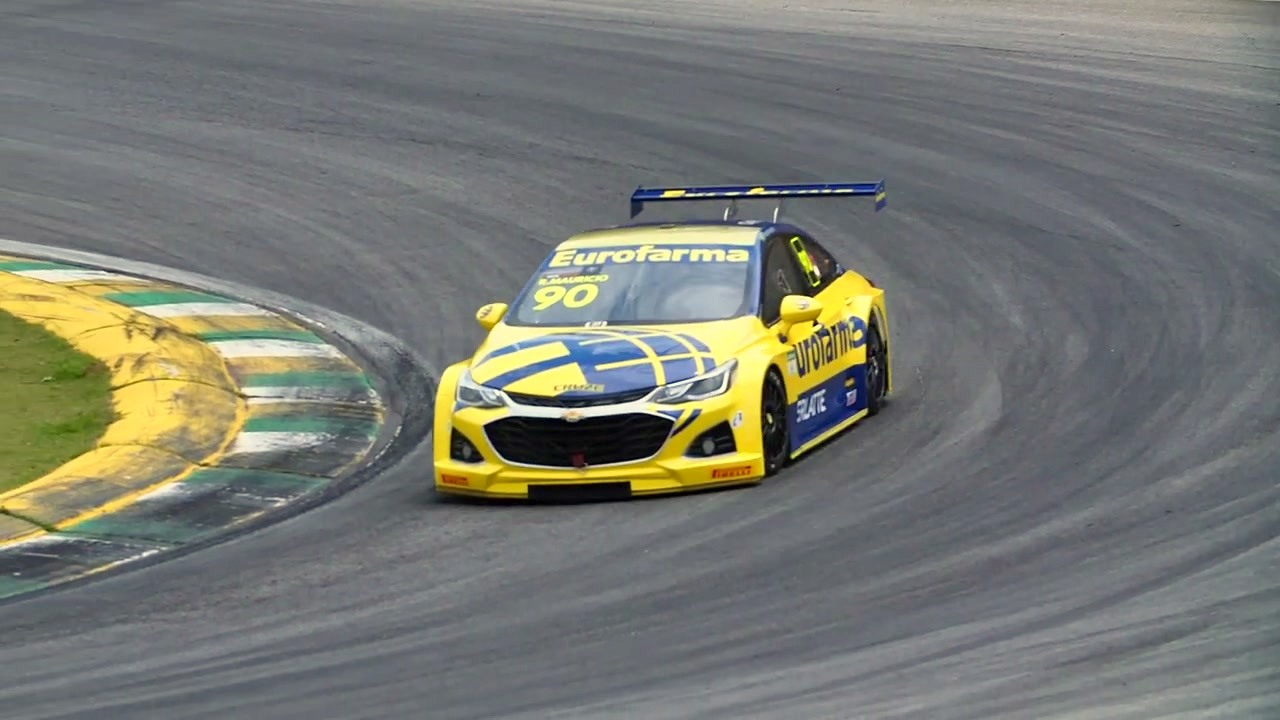
Gabriel Casagrande (top) won his second drivers' championship, Daniel Serra (middle left) was runner-up, Ricardo Zonta (middle right) was third. RC Competições won the teams' championship.

The 2023 Stock Car Pro Series was the 45th season of the Stock Car Pro Series, the premier touring car racing series in Brazil, and the second season under the Stock Car Pro Series moniker. The season started at the Autódromo Internacional Ayrton Senna on April 2. The final race of the season was held at Interlagos on 17 December. The championship was won by Gabriel Casagrande.

== Calendar ==
The schedule for the 2023 season was released on 3 December 2022. On 12 April 2023, the calendar was modified, in which Tarumã, Cascavel, Velopark, and Buenos Aires returned to the calendar: On 25 September 2023, the round at Brasília on 24–26 November was replaced by another round at Cascavel on the same date.

Round	Circuit (Event)	Dates	Map
1	Autódromo Internacional Ayrton Senna (Mixed Circuit); Goiânia, Goiás	2 April	2023 Stock Car Pro Series is located in South America
2	(São Paulo (state)) Autódromo José Carlos Pace; São Paulo, São Paulo	23 April	2023 Stock Car Pro Series is located in South America
3	Autódromo Internacional de Tarumã; Viamão, Rio Grande do Sul	21 May	2023 Stock Car Pro Series is located in South America
4	(Paraná (state)) Autódromo Internacional de Cascavel; Cascavel, Paraná	18 June	2023 Stock Car Pro Series is located in South America
5	(São Paulo (state)) Autódromo José Carlos Pace; São Paulo, São Paulo	9 July	2023 Stock Car Pro Series is located in South America
6	(São Paulo (state)) Autódromo Velo Città; Mogi Guaçu, São Paulo	6 August	2023 Stock Car Pro Series is located in South America
7	Autódromo Internacional Ayrton Senna (External Circuit); Goiânia, Goiás	27 August	2023 Stock Car Pro Series is located in South America
8	Velopark; Nova Santa Rita, Rio Grande do Sul	17 September	2023 Stock Car Pro Series is located in South America
9	Autódromo Oscar y Juan Gálvez; Buenos Aires, Argentina	8 October	2023 Stock Car Pro Series is located in South America
10	(São Paulo (state)) Autódromo Velo Città; Mogi Guaçu, São Paulo	29 October	2023 Stock Car Pro Series is located in South America
11	(Paraná (state)) Autódromo Internacional de Cascavel; Cascavel, Paraná	26 November	2023 Stock Car Pro Series is located in South America
12	(São Paulo (state)) Autódromo José Carlos Pace (Super Final BRB); São Paulo, São Paulo	17 December	2023 Stock Car Pro Series is located in South America

=== Format ===
Each event features two races of 30 minutes held back-to-back. The grid for the first race is set using the results of qualifying, whereas the grid for the second race is taken from the results of race one with the top ten reversed.

== Teams and drivers ==
Championship entries
Team	Car	No.	Drivers	Rounds
KTF Sports	Chevrolet Cruze Stock Car	0	(Brazil) Cacá Bueno	All
KTF Sports	Chevrolet Cruze Stock Car	3	(Brazil) Rodrigo Baptista	All
KTF Racing	Chevrolet Cruze Stock Car	85	(Brazil) Guilherme Salas	All
KTF Racing	Chevrolet Cruze Stock Car	121	(Brazil) Felipe Baptista	All
TMG Racing	Chevrolet Cruze Stock Car	4	(Brazil) Júlio Campos	All
TMG Racing	Chevrolet Cruze Stock Car	19	(Brazil) Felipe Massa	All
Cavaleiro Sports	Chevrolet Cruze Stock Car	5	(Brazil) Denis Navarro	All
Cavaleiro Sports	Chevrolet Cruze Stock Car	80	(Brazil) Marcos Gomes	All
Texaco Racing	Toyota Corolla Stock Car	6	(Brazil) Tony Kanaan	1–2, 4–12
Texaco Racing	Toyota Corolla Stock Car	81	(Brazil) Arthur Leist	3
Mobil Ale Full Time	Toyota Corolla Stock Car	91	(Brazil) Eduardo Barrichello	All
Mobil Ale Full Time	Toyota Corolla Stock Car	111	(Brazil) Rubens Barrichello	All
Full Time Sports	Toyota Corolla Stock Car	101	(Brazil) Gianluca Petecof	All
Full Time Sports	Toyota Corolla Stock Car	117	(Argentina) Matías Rossi	1–2, 4–7, 9, 11–12
Pole Motorsport	Chevrolet Cruze Stock Car	8	(Brazil) Rafael Suzuki	All
Pole Motorsport	Chevrolet Cruze Stock Car	51	(Brazil) Átila Abreu	All
RCM Motorsport	Toyota Corolla Stock Car	10	(Brazil) Ricardo Zonta	All
RCM Motorsport	Toyota Corolla Stock Car	44	(Brazil) Bruno Baptista	All
Hot Car Competições	Chevrolet Cruze Stock Car	11	(Brazil) Gaetano Di Mauro	1–11
Hot Car Competições	Chevrolet Cruze Stock Car	27	(Brazil) Sérgio Ramalho	12
Hot Car Competições	Chevrolet Cruze Stock Car	95	(Brazil) Lucas Kohl	All
A.Mattheis Vogel	Chevrolet Cruze Stock Car	12	(Brazil) Lucas Foresti	All
A.Mattheis Vogel	Chevrolet Cruze Stock Car	83	(Brazil) Gabriel Casagrande	All
Blau Motorsport	Chevrolet Cruze Stock Car	18	(Brazil) Allam Khodair	All
Blau Motorsport	Chevrolet Cruze Stock Car	88	(Brazil) Felipe Fraga	1–4, 6–12
Blau Motorsport	Chevrolet Cruze Stock Car	70	(Brazil) Diego Nunes	5
Ipiranga Racing	Toyota Corolla Stock Car	16	(Brazil) Thiago Camilo	All
Ipiranga Racing	Toyota Corolla Stock Car	30	(Brazil) César Ramos	All
Scuderia Chiarelli	Toyota Corolla Stock Car	22	(Brazil) Antonio Junqueira	6
Scuderia Chiarelli	Toyota Corolla Stock Car	37	(Brazil) Raphael Teixeira	1–5, 7
Scuderia Chiarelli	Toyota Corolla Stock Car	37	(Uruguay) Santiago Urrutia	8–9
Scuderia Chiarelli	Toyota Corolla Stock Car	73	(Brazil) Sérgio Jimenez	All
Scuderia Chiarelli	Toyota Corolla Stock Car	110	(Brazil) Felipe Lapenna	10, 12
Crown Racing	Toyota Corolla Stock Car	28	(Brazil) Enzo Elias	All
Crown Racing	Toyota Corolla Stock Car	32	(Brazil) Rafael Martins	2
Crown Racing	Toyota Corolla Stock Car	33	(Brazil) Nelson Piquet Jr.	1, 3–12
Eurofarma RC	Chevrolet Cruze Stock Car	29	(Brazil) Daniel Serra	All
Eurofarma RC	Chevrolet Cruze Stock Car	90	(Brazil) Ricardo Maurício	All

=== Team changes ===
The field was reduced from thirty-four to thirty-two cars.

Crown Racing and TMG Racing decreased their operations from three to two cars and RKL left the series after two seasons. Full Time Sports was the only team that increased its operation from four to five cars.

Crown Racing changed from Chevrolet to Toyota.

Full Time Sports divided its operations into three cars, two cars with the Mobil Ale name, and one under the Texaco Racing name. After seven seasons, Bassani Racing did not return as a subsidiary of FTS.

Pole Motorsport reverted to its original name after their sponsor Shell ended its support for the team.

R.Mattheis Motorsport and TMG Racing swapped their main sponsors. Lubrax switched to TMG and Blau Pharmaceutical moved to R.Mattheis.

=== Driver changes ===
Diego Nunes, Pedro Cardoso and Galid Osman left the series to join TCR South America.

Eduardo Barrichello moved up to the series with Full Time Sports after competing part time with the team in 2021 and 2022.

Enzo Elias graduated from Porsche Cup Brasil to race full time at Crown Racing. He replaced Cacá Bueno and Rodrigo Baptista, who left the team and joined KTF Sports.

Felipe Massa and Júlio Campos left R.Mattheis Motorsport to join TMG Racing. Allam Khodair, who raced for R.Mattheis in 2022, joined TMG alongside Felipe Fraga, who returned for the series after competing in the DTM championship.

Lucas Foresti left KTF to replace Matias Rossi at A.Mattheis Vogel. Rossi returned to Full Time Sports, replacing Rafael Suzuki, who joined Pole Motorsport.

Lucas Kohl graduated from Stock Series to race for Hot Car Competições alongside Gaetano di Mauro, who left KTF Sports. Felipe Lappena and Tuca Antoniazzi, who raced for Hot Car in 2022, both left the series.

Raphael Teixeira moved up to the series full time with Scuderia Chiarelli, having raced as a wildcard in several events in 2021 and 2022. He replaced Beto Monteiro, who left the series.

=== Mid-season changes ===
Nelson Piquet Jr. missed the second round due a conflict with the 2023 4 Hours of Barcelona, the first round of European Le Mans Series. He was replaced by Rafael Martins.

Tony Kanaan missed the third round to compete in the 2023 Indianapolis 500. He was replaced by Arthur Leist.

Matias Rossi missed three rounds due to schedule clashes with commitments in the Turismo Carretera.

Felipe Fraga missed the fifth round due to a conflict with the IMSA SportsCar Championship's Chevrolet Grand Prix.

Scuderia Chiarelli made a number of driver changes throughout the season. Antonio Junqueira, Santiago Urrutia and Felipe Lapenna competed in place of Raphael Teixeira.

Sérgio Ramalho made his debut in the series for Hot Car Competições at the final round in Interlagos, standing in for Gaetano di Mauro.

== Results and standings ==
=== Season summary ===
Round		Circuit	Date	Pole position	Fastest lap	Winning driver	Winning team
1	R1	(Goiás) Goiânia (Mixed Circuit)	2 April	(Brazil) Bruno Baptista	(Brazil) Ricardo Zonta	(Brazil) Daniel Serra	Eurofarma RC
1	R2	(Goiás) Goiânia (Mixed Circuit)	2 April		(Brazil) Ricardo Zonta	(Brazil) Thiago Camilo	Ipiranga Racing
2	R1	(São Paulo (state)) Interlagos	23 April	(Brazil) Gabriel Casagrande	(Brazil) Gabriel Casagrande	(Brazil) Gabriel Casagrande	A.Mattheis Vogel
2	R2	(São Paulo (state)) Interlagos	23 April		(Brazil) Rafael Suzuki	(Brazil) Ricardo Maurício	Eurofarma RC
3	R1	(Rio Grande do Sul) Tarumã	21 May	(Brazil) Thiago Camilo	(Brazil) Thiago Camilo	(Brazil) Thiago Camilo	Ipiranga Racing
3	R2	(Rio Grande do Sul) Tarumã	21 May		(Brazil) Ricardo Zonta	(Brazil) Rubens Barrichello	Mobil Ale Full Time
4	R1	(Paraná (state)) Cascavel	18 June	(Brazil) Felipe Fraga	(Brazil) Felipe Fraga	(Brazil) Daniel Serra	Eurofarma RC
4	R2	(Paraná (state)) Cascavel	18 June		(Brazil) Thiago Camilo	(Brazil) Eduardo Barrichello	Mobil Ale Full Time
5	R1	(São Paulo (state)) Interlagos	9 July	(Argentina) Matías Rossi	(Brazil) Nelson Piquet, Jr.	(Argentina) Matías Rossi	Full Time Sports
5	R2	(São Paulo (state)) Interlagos	9 July		(Brazil) Nelson Piquet, Jr.	(Brazil) Ricardo Zonta	RCM Motorsport
6	R1	(São Paulo (state)) Mogi Guaçu	6 August	(Brazil) Ricardo Zonta	(Brazil) Ricardo Zonta	(Brazil) Ricardo Zonta	RCM Motorsport
6	R2	(São Paulo (state)) Mogi Guaçu	6 August		(Argentina) Matías Rossi	(Argentina) Matías Rossi	Full Time Sports
7	R1	(Goiás) Goiânia (External Circuit)	27 August	(Brazil) César Ramos	(Brazil) César Ramos	(Brazil) César Ramos	Ipiranga Racing
7	R2	(Goiás) Goiânia (External Circuit)	27 August		(Brazil) Átila Abreu	(Brazil) Átila Abreu	Pole Motorsport
8	R1	(Rio Grande do Sul) Velopark	17 September	(Brazil) Gabriel Casagrande	(Brazil) Gabriel Casagrande	(Brazil) Gabriel Casagrande	A.Mattheis Vogel
8	R2	(Rio Grande do Sul) Velopark	17 September		(Brazil) Lucas Foresti	(Brazil) Átila Abreu	Pole Motorsport
9	R1	(Argentina) Buenos Aires	8 October	(Brazil) Felipe Fraga	(Brazil) Felipe Fraga	(Brazil) Gabriel Casagrande	A.Mattheis Vogel
9	R2	(Argentina) Buenos Aires	8 October		(Argentina) Matías Rossi	(Argentina) Matías Rossi	Full Time Sports
10	R1	(São Paulo (state)) Mogi Guaçu	29 October	(Brazil) Felipe Fraga	(Brazil) Felipe Fraga	(Brazil) Daniel Serra	Eurofarma RC
10	R2	(São Paulo (state)) Mogi Guaçu	29 October		(Brazil) Cacá Bueno	(Brazil) Ricardo Maurício	Eurofarma RC
11	R1	(Paraná (state)) Cascavel	26 November	(Brazil) Bruno Baptista	(Brazil) Daniel Serra	(Brazil) Bruno Baptista	RCM Motorsport
11	R2	(Paraná (state)) Cascavel	26 November		(Brazil) Marcos Gomes	(Brazil) Felipe Massa	Lubrax Podium
12	R1	(São Paulo (state)) Interlagos	17 December	(Brazil) Ricardo Zonta	(Brazil) Ricardo Zonta	(Brazil) Ricardo Zonta	RCM Motorsport
12	R2	(São Paulo (state)) Interlagos	17 December		(Brazil) Ricardo Maurício	(Brazil) Felipe Massa	Lubrax Podium

=== Championship standings ===
Points system

Points are awarded for each race at an event to the driver/s of a car that completed at least 75% of the race distance and was running at the completion of the race. Before the last round, the four worst results are discarded. Races in which a driver has been disqualified cannot be discarded. The second race of each event is held with partially reversed top ten grid.

Points format	Position																				
Points format	1st	2nd	3rd	4th	5th	6th	7th	8th	9th	10th	11th	12th	13th	14th	15th	16th	17th	18th	19th	20th	Pole
Race 1	30	26	22	19	17	15	14	13	12	11	10	9	8	7	6	5	4	3	2	1	2
Race 2	24	20	18	17	16	15	14	13	12	11	10	9	8	7	6	5	4	3	2	1	

Drivers' Championship

Pos	Driver	GYN1		INT1		TAR		CAS1		INT2		MOG1		GYN2		VLP		BUE		MOG2		CAS2		INT3		Pts
1	(Brazil) Gabriel Casagrande	4	24	**1**	6	3	12	3	5	23	22	18	2	7	22	**1**	7	1	19	4	10	18	17	3	21	308
2	(Brazil) Daniel Serra	1	8	26	11	23	6	1	17	7	5	7	3	Ret	5	10	DNS	19	Ret	1	12	2	7	5	12	296
3	(Brazil) Ricardo Zonta	3	17	10	17	24	4	11	Ret	6	1	1	Ret	4	8	15	2	27	10	Ret	Ret	6	4	**1**	10	280
4	(Brazil) Thiago Camilo	6	1	23	9	**1**	5	6	4	8	13	23	8	17	Ret	11	19	4	4	8	6	15	Ret	6	6	280
5	(Brazil) Felipe Fraga	Ret	3	8	20	2	Ret	**2**	20			11	9	6	Ret	2	9	**2**	6	**2**	3	16	25	Ret	9	265
6	(Brazil) Rafael Suzuki	Ret	Ret	29	2	6	9	8	3	15	12	6	7	5	2	12	17	7	3	7	23	7	13	4	20	263
7	(Brazil) Rubens Barrichello	14	6	7	4	19	1	16	Ret	10	6	5	5	15	3	8	3	9	2	11	22	17	Ret	18	3	260
8	(Brazil) Ricardo Maurício	7	2	9	1	Ret	18	24	7	20	16	24	Ret	14	Ret	6	6	8	9	9	1	Ret	3	15	4	231
9	(Brazil) Felipe Baptista	26	7	27	5	Ret	14	15	8	2	7	26	6	16	9	14	15	14	22	3	9	5	10	8	13	229
10	(Brazil) Felipe Massa	21	Ret	16	Ret	20	11	23	12	3	2	12	11	12	21	17	Ret	12	7	5	2	9	1	14	1	224
11	(Brazil) César Ramos	11	16	11	8	4	2	4	18	27	21	19	Ret	**1**	16	Ret	16	11	26	17	15	13	16	9	14	209
12	(Brazil) Guilherme Salas	20	15	2	15	10	8	10	10	11	15	8	10	Ret	Ret	4	5	5	8	DSQ	24	3	20	23	Ret	207
13	(Brazil) Gianluca Petecof	24	18	Ret	DNS	13	10	19	13	9	8	2	4	13	4	3	4	3	5	18	Ret	20	Ret	22	Ret	205
14	(Brazil) Nelson Piquet Jr.	5	10			5	Ret	Ret	Ret	4	4	9	16	2	23	19	8	15	15	24	4	21	18	27	8	191
15	(Brazil) Júlio Campos	9	20	DSQ	DSQ	8	15	9	21	24	11	14	Ret	20	Ret	Ret	12	17	16	6	7	4	9	2	19	185
16	(Brazil) Bruno Baptista	**2**	21	3	7	22	16	12	15	17	Ret	15	Ret	Ret	6	Ret	Ret	25	25	14	20	**1**	14	7	5	181
17	(Argentina) Matías Rossi	19	9	18	Ret			Ret	11	1	3	10	1	11	Ret			10	1			11	19	24	11	178
18	(Brazil) Átila Abreu	25	Ret	13	21	Ret	3	21	16	29	10	Ret	DNS	8	**1**	7	**1**	22	Ret	26	5	25	2	10	7	177
19	(Brazil) Lucas Foresti	13	14	19	12	17	Ret	7	19	14	18	DSQ	12	3	13	9	21	23	17	13	21	10	6	12	Ret	151
20	(Brazil) Gaetano di Mauro	Ret	4	4	3	14	19	25	Ret	5	14	25	DSQ	9	11	Ret	Ret	21	12	DNS	17	8	5			148
21	(Brazil) Eduardo Barrichello	15	13	22	22	WD	WD	13	1	12	9	Ret	DNS	15	Ret	20	Ret	6	11	27	8	12	11	17	Ret	140
22	(Brazil) Allam Khodair	8	12	25	24	16	13	5	6	26	23	4	13	24	Ret	21	Ret	18	Ret	16	11	24	12	19	23	122
23	(Brazil) Cacá Bueno	Ret	19	14	13	9	22	20	2	13	27	13	Ret	21	10	13	21	20	13	10	19	19	23	21	Ret	117
24	(Brazil) Marcos Gomes	10	5	12	23	21	7	18	Ret	16	17	18	Ret	19	12	23	22	13	24	22	25	Ret	26	Ret	2	105
25	(Brazil) Denis Navarro	16	11	6	10	7	24	17	14	Ret	20	20	DSQ	23	14	Ret	13	DSQ	20	23	14	14	21	25	15	102
26	(Brazil) Enzo Elias	22	Ret	5	DSQ	15	Ret	22	Ret	30	Ret	17	Ret	23	7	24	14	26	Ret	12	Ret	23	8	11	18	81
27	(Brazil) Rodrigo Baptista	18	Ret	20	Ret	18	17	Ret	23	18	24	Ret	DNS	Ret	15	5	10	16	18	15	Ret	Ret	Ret	20	16	68
28	(Brazil) Sérgio Jimenez	12	22	28	Ret	11	21	Ret	Ret	28	19	3	15	Ret	20	16	18	DSQ	23	20	Ret	Ret	15	28	Ret	64
29	(Brazil) Lucas Kohl	17	23	15	16	Ret	20	14	9	22	26	25	Ret	Ret	17	22	20	DSQ	21	25	16	Ret	22	16	22	48
30	(Brazil) Tony Kanaan	23	Ret	17	19			Ret	22	25	25	21	14	18	18	18	Ret	24	14	21	18	22	24	26	Ret	29
31	(Brazil) Felipe Lapenna																			19	13			Ret	17	14
32	(Brazil) Arthur Leist					12	23																			9
33	(Brazil) Sérgio Ramalho																							13	24	8
34	(Brazil) Rafael Martins			24	14																					6
35	(Brazil) Antônio Junqueira											Ret	17													4
36	(Brazil) Raphael Teixeira	27	Ret	21	18	Ret	25	WD	WD	21	Ret			30	19											4
37	(Brazil) Diego Nunes									19	Ret															2
38	(Uruguay) Santiago Urrutia															WD	WD	Ret	Ret							0
Pos	Driver	GYN1		INT1		TAR		CAS1		INT2		MOG1		GYN2		VLP		BUE		MOG2		CAS2		INT3		Pts

Colour	Result
Gold	Winner
Silver	Second place
Bronze	Third place
Green	Points classification
Blue	Non-points classification
Blue	Non-classified finish (NC)
Purple	Retired, not classified (Ret)
Red	Did not qualify (DNQ)
Red	Did not pre-qualify (DNPQ)
Black	Disqualified (DSQ)
White	Did not start (DNS)
White	Withdrew (WD)
White	Race cancelled (C)
Blank	Did not practice (DNP)
Blank	Did not arrive (DNA)
Blank	Excluded (EX)

**Bold** – Pole position
Italics – Fastest lap
† – Retired, but classified

== Broadcasting ==
TV (Brazil only)	Internet (Global)
Band	YouTube
SportTV	Motorsport.tv
TV (Russia only)	Facebook
Моторспорт ТВ	Zoome
	Catve.com
	Auto Videos
	Twitch

== See also ==
- 2023 Stock Series
- 2023 Turismo Nacional BR
- 2023 F4 Brazilian Championship
