= Júlio Campos =

Brazilian auto racing driver (born 1982)

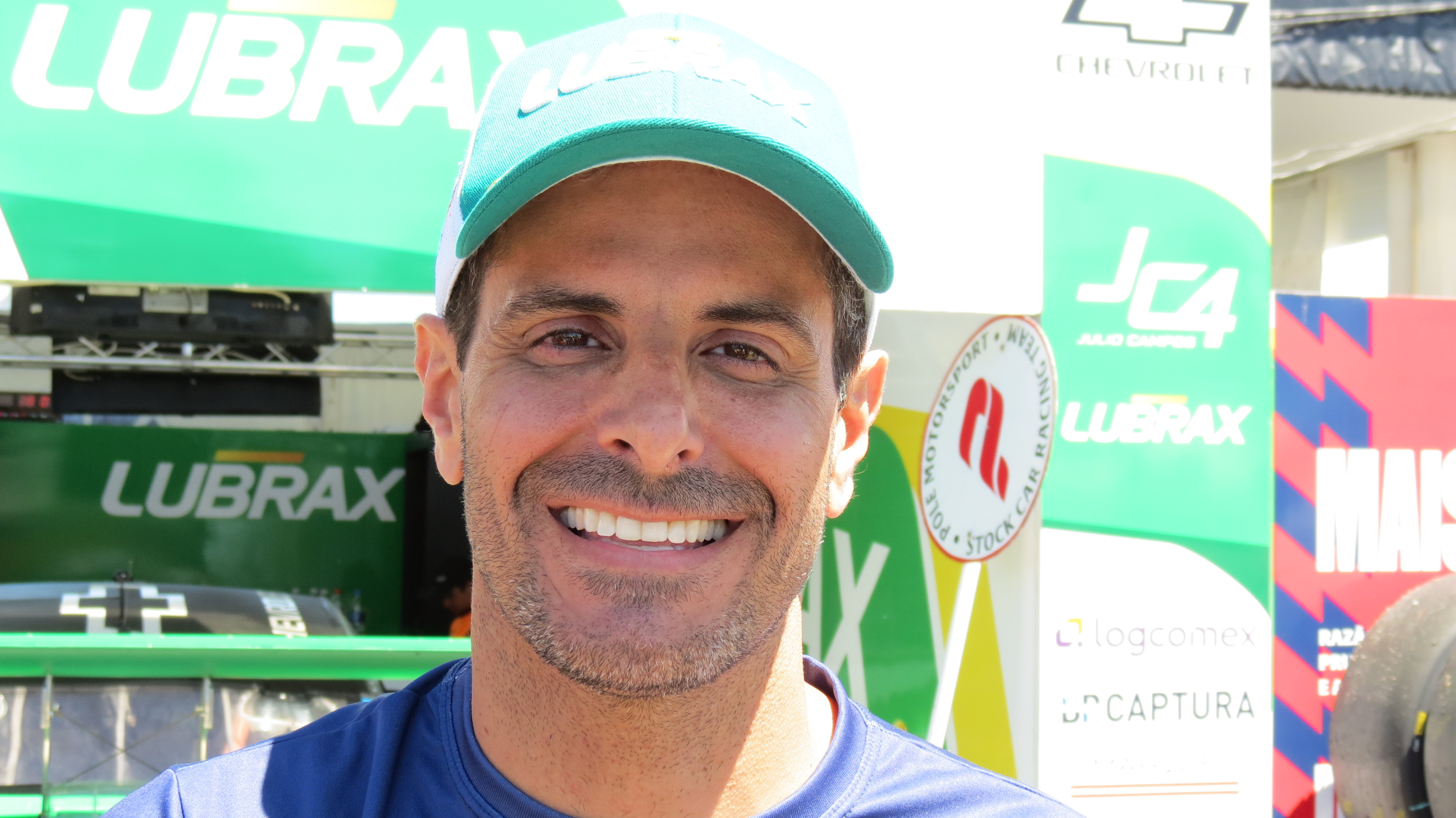
- Campos in 2024
- Nationality: (Brazil) Brazilian
- Born: 15 January 1982 (age 44) Curitiba, Brazil

NASCAR Brasil Sprint Race career
- Debut season: 2006
- Current team: Carlos Alves Competições
- Car number: 4
- Starts: 30
- Wins: 1
- Poles: 0
- Fastest laps: 0
- Best finish: 11th in 2010

Júlio Campos (born 15 January 1982) is a Brazilian auto racing driver. He currently drives in the Stock Car Brasil and NASCAR Brasil Sprint Race.

Campos won the Formula Dodge National Championship in 2001 and Pick Up Racing Brazil in 2009. He is brother of the deceased driver Marco Campos, who died in an accident in a Formula 3000 race at the Circuit de Nevers Magny-Cours, making him the only driver ever killed in the International Formula 3000 series.

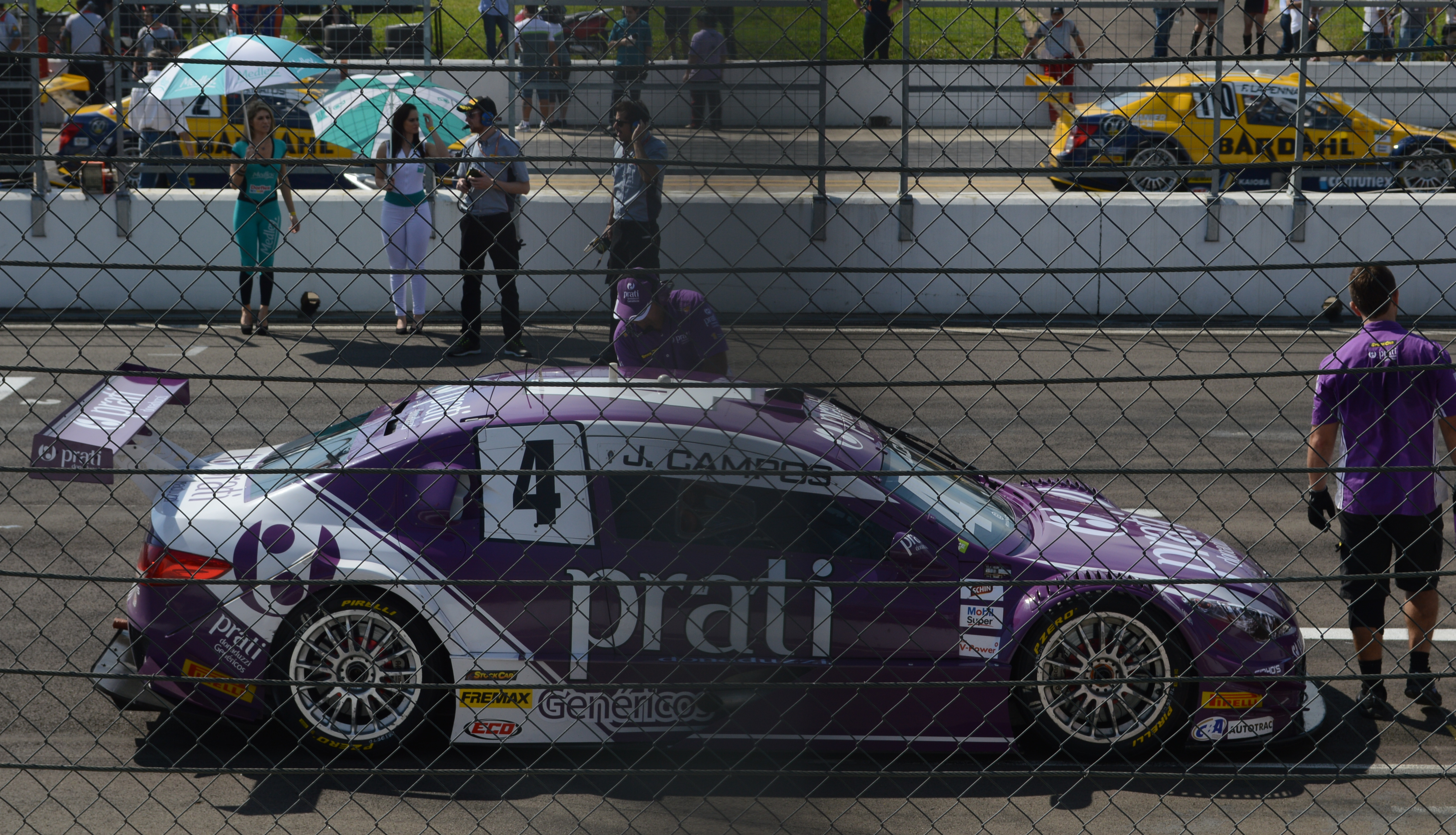
Júlio Campos at the grid, waiting for the start of a Stock Car race in 2014

== Racing record ==
=== Racing career summary ===
Season	Series	Team	Races	Wins	Poles	Podiums	F/Laps	Points	Position
2000	Fórmula Junior Brasil		4	1	1	3	1	50	9th
2001	Formula Dodge National Championship		13	4	5	8	2	168	1st
2002	Barber Dodge Pro Series		8	0	1	2	0	49	10th
2002	Formula Renault 2.0 Brazil	RS2 Competições	3	0	0	0	0	4	25th
2003	Formula Renault 2.0 Brazil	Medina-M4T Motorsport	2	0	0	0	0	0	NC
2005	Formula Three Sudamericana	PropCar	2	0	0	0	0	0	NC
2005	Stock Car Light Brasil	Full Time Racing	9	2	3	4	0	112	3rd
2006	Stock Car Brasil	RS Competições	4	0	0	0	0	0	NC
2007	Stock Car Brasil	Sama-GomeSports; RCM Motorsport	5	0	0	0	0	0	NC
2008	Stock Car Brasil	Panasonic Racing	5	0	0	0	0	22	25th
2008	Copa Vicar	A. Guaraná Sports	1	0	0	0	0	0	NC
2009	Copa Vicar	Carlos Alves Competições	9	1	2	4	2	115	3rd
2009	Pick Up Racing Brazil	AMD Racing	8	4	4	6	3	137	1st
2009	GT3 Brasil Championship	WB Motorsport	2	0	0	1	0	15	33rd
2010	Stock Car Brasil	JF Racing	12	0	0	2	0	69	11th
2010	GT Brasil	WB Motorsport; Blau Full Time Ferrari	8	0	0	0	0	61	21st
2010	Copa Chevrolet Montana	AMD Racing	3	1	0	1	0	25	20th
2011	Stock Car Brasil	Scuderia 111; Crystal Racing Team	12	0	0	0	0	15	22nd
2011	Brasileiro de Marcas	Carlos Alves Competições	2	0	0	1	1	322	19th
2012	Stock Car Brasil	Carlos Alves Competições	12	0	0	1	0	136	8th
2012	Brasileiro de Marcas	Scuderia 111	4	0	0	0	0	28	18th
2012	Copa Fiat Brasil	GF Sports	2	0	0	0	0	N/A	N/A
2013	Stock Car Brasil	Prati-Donaduzzi	12	0	1	1	0	67	18th
2013	Brasileiro de Marcas	Carlos Alves Competições	10	0	0	1	0	44	15th
2013	Campeonato Sudamericano de GT	Scuderia 111	6	0	0	4	0	75	7th
2014	Stock Car Brasil	Prati-Donaduzzi	21	1	2	5	2	167.5	8th
2014	Brasileiro de Marcas	C2 Team	1	0	0	0	0	N/A	N/A
2014	United SportsCar Championship - Prototype Challenge	Performance Tech	1	0	0	1	0	31	30th
2015	Stock Car Brasil	Prati-Donaduzzi	21	1	0	5	0	154	11th
2015	FARA Endurance Championship - MP-1A	Engmakers Int.	2	1	1	1	1	N/A	N/A
2016	Stock Car Brasil	C2 Team	21	1	0	2	1	170	11th
2016	FARA Endurance Championship - MP-1A	Stuttgart Motorsport	3	0	2	1	2	40	3rd
2016	Porsche Endurance Cup	N/A	1	0	0	0	0	20	42nd
2017	Stock Car Brasil	Prati-Donaduzzi	21	0	0	0	2	125	12th
2017	FARA Endurance Championship - MP-1A	Engmakers Int.	1	0	0	0	0	N/A	N/A
2017	Porsche Endurance Cup	N/A	1	0	0	0	0	0	29th
2018	Stock Car Brasil	Prati-Donaduzzi	21	0	0	5	1	252	3rd
2018	Campeonato Gaúcho de Superturismo - GT	MC Tubarão	1	0	0	0	0	N/A	N/A
2018	Dopamina Endurance Brasil - GT3	Scuderia 111	1	1	0	1	0	100	11th
2018	Dopamina Endurance Brasil - P1	JLM Racing	1	0	0	1	0	120	15th
2019	Stock Car Brasil	Prati-Donaduzzi	21	1	1	4	1	307	6th
2019	Império Endurance Brasil - GT3	Scuderia 111	8	1	3	6	2	710	4th
2019	IMSA Prototype Challenge - LMP3	Performance Tech	1	0	0	0	0	17	47th
2020	Stock Car Brasil	Crown Racing	18	1	1	2	0	175	13th
2020	Império Endurance Brasil - GT3	AMG	2	0	1	1	0	65	9th
2020	Império Endurance Brasil - GT3L	Tech Force	2	2	2	2	2	270	4th
2021	Stock Car Pro Series	Lubrax Podium	23	0	0	2	1	190	15th
2021	Império Endurance Brasil - GT3	AMG CAC Competições	8	0	0	0	2	435	6th
2021	GT Sprint Race Brasil	N/A	12	5	0	10	2	261	1st
2022	Stock Car Pro Series	Lubrax Podium	23	0	0	1	0	148	17th
2022	Império Endurance Brasil - GT3	Team RC	8	1	1	2	1	818	3rd
2023	Stock Car Pro Series	Lubrax Podium	22	0	0	1	0	185	15th
2023	Império Endurance Brasil - GT3	Team RC	3	1	0	2	0		
2023	NASCAR Brasil Sprint Race – Pro		6	4	2	5	1	280	1st
2024	Stock Car Pro Series	Pole Motorsport							
2024	NASCAR Brasil Challenge	Singus Competition	5	1	?	1	?	92	11th
2025	NASCAR Brasil Series	MX Vogel							

== Racing career ==
=== American Open-Wheel racing results ===
(key) (Races in bold indicate pole position, races in italics indicate fastest race lap)

==== Barber Dodge Pro Series ====
Year	1	2	3	4	5	6	7	8	9	10	Rank	Points
2002	SEB; 3	LRP; 5	LAG; 23	**POR**; 18	TOR; 12	CLE; 2	VAN; 13	MOH; 23	ROA	MTL	**10th**	**49**

=== Stock Car Brasil results ===
Year	Team	Car	1	2	3	4	5	6	7	8	9	10	11	12	13	14	15	16	17	18	19	20	21	22	23	24	25	Rank	Points
2006	RS Competições	Volkswagen Bora	INT; Ret	CTB; Ret	CGD; 20	INT	LON	CTB	SCZ	BSB; 18	TAR	ARG	RIO	INT														NC	0
2007	Sama GomeSports/FF	Volkswagen Bora	INT; Ret	CTB; 29	CGD; 28	INT	LON; 32	SCZ	CTB	BRA	ARG	TAR; Ret	RIO	INT														NC	0
2008	L&M Racing	Peugeot 307	INT	BSB	CTB; 10	SCZ; 24	CGD; 10	INT; 6	RIO; 23	LON	CTB; Ret	BSB	TAR	INT														25th	22
2010	JF Racing	Peugeot 307	INT; 8	CTB; Ret	VEL; 3	RIO; 9	RBP; Ret	SAL; 27	INT; 18	CGD; Ret	LON; 4	SCZ; 16	BSB; 8	CTB; 3														11th	69
2011	Scuderia 111	Peugeot 408	CTB; 7	INT; 14	RBP; 9	VEL; DSQ	CGD; Ret	RIO; Ret																				22nd	15
2011	RZ Motorsport	Chevrolet Vectra							INT; 9	SAL; Ret	SCZ; 14	LON; 15	BSB; 11	VEL; 15														22nd	15
2012	Carlos Alves Competições	Peugeot 408	INT; 8	CTB; 9	VEL; 19	RBP; 4	LON; 8	RIO; 11	SAL; 21	CAS; 2	TAR; 24	CTB; 8	BSB; 20	INT; 4														8th	136
2013	Prati-Mico's Racing	Peugeot 408	**INT**; Ret	CUR; 11	TAR; 6	SAL; Ret	BRA; DSQ	CAS; 2	RBP; 8	CAS; 12	VEL; Ret	CUR; 22	BRA; Ret	INT; Ret														18th	67
2014	Prati-Mico's Racing	Peugeot 408	INT; 1; 11	SCZ; 1; 14	SCZ; 2 Ret	BRA; 1; 6	BRA; 2; 2	GOI; 1; 15	GOI; 2; 3	GOI; 1; 5	**CAS**; **1**; 2	CAS; 2; 26	CUR; 1; 6	CUR; 2; 22	**VEL**; **1** Ret	VEL; 2; 20	SAL; 1; 8	SAL; 2; 2	TAR; 1; 1	TAR; 2; 12	RBP; 1; 13	RBP; 2; 7	CUR; 1; 23					8th	167.5
2015	Prati-Mico's Racing	Peugeot 408	INT; 1; 9	SCZ; 1; 3	SCZ; 2; 8	BRA; 1; 3	BRA; 2; 3	GOI; 1; 8	GOI; 2; 1	GOI; 1 Ret	CAS; 1; 16	CAS; 2; 5	CUR; 1; 2	CUR; 2; 16	VEL; 1; 29	VEL; 2 DNS	SAL; 1; 9	SAL; 2; 20	TAR; 1; 15	TAR; 2; 8	RBP; 1 Ret	RBP; 2; 7	CUR; 1 Ret					11th	154
2016	C2 Team	Chevrolet Cruze	CUR; 1 Ret	VEL; 1 Ret	VEL; 2; 16	GOI; 1; 9	GOI; 2 Ret	SCZ; 1; 11	SCZ; 2 Ret	TAR; 1 Ret	TAR; 2; 1	CAS; 1 Ret	CAS; 2; 3	INT; 1; 7	LON; 1 Ret	LON; 2 Ret	CUR; 1; 6	CUR; 2 Ret	GOI; 1; 6	GOI; 2; 19†	CRI; 1; 7	CRI; 2; 8	INT; 1; 5					11th	170
2017	Prati-Donaduzzi	Chevrolet Cruze	GOI; 1 Ret	GOI; 2; 15	VEL; 1; 12	VEL; 2 Ret	SCZ; 1; 13	SCZ; 2; 22	CAS; 1; 11	CAS; 2; 7	CUR; 1; 5	CRI; 1; 6	CRI; 2; 11	VCA; 1; 11	VCA; 2; 5	LON; 1; 26	LON; 2 Ret	ARG; 1; 27	ARG; 2; 4	TAR; 1; 8	TAR; 2 Ret	GOI; 1 Ret	GOI; 2 Ret	INT; 1; 9				12th	149
2018	Prati-Donaduzzi	Chevrolet Cruze	INT; 1; 24	CUR; 1; 4	CUR; 2 Ret	VEL; 1; 3	VEL; 2; 3	LON; 1; 8	LON; 2 Ret	SCZ; 1; 4	SCZ; 2; 9	GOI; 1 Ret	MOU; 1; 13	MOU; 2 Ret	CAS; 1; 4	CAS; 2; 2	VCA; 1; 5	VCA; 2; 5	TAR; 1; 2	TAR; 2; 14	GOI; 1; 7	GOI; 2; 9	INT; 1; 2					3rd	252
2019	Prati-Donaduzzi	Chevrolet Cruze	VEL; 1; 10	VCA; 1; 9	VCA; 2; 19	GOI; 1; 9	GOI; 2; 2	LON; 1; 3	LON; 2; 10	**SCZ**; **1**; 1	SCZ; 2; 6	MOU; 1; 2	MOU; 2; 13	INT; 1; 10	VEL; 1; 8	VEL; 2; 15	CAS; 1; 12	CAS; 2; 4	VCA; 1; 5	VCA; 2; 6	GOI; 1; 10	GOI; 2; 5	INT; 1; 9					6th	307
2020	Crown Racing	Chevrolet Cruze	GOI; 1; 12	GOI; 2; 18	INT; 1; 18	INT; 2; 10	LON; 1; 9	LON; 2; 14	CAS; 1 Ret	CAS; 2; 3	CAS; 3; 17	VCA; 1; 1	VCA; 2 Ret	CUR; 1; 9	CUR; 2; 7	CUR; 3; 8	GOI; 1; 14	GOI; 2; 10	GOI; 3; 14	INT; 1; 14								13th	175
2021	Lubrax Podium	Chevrolet Cruze	GOI; 1; 11	GOI; 2 Ret	INT; 1; 17	INT; 2; 17	VCA; 1; 21	VCA; 2; 6	VCA; 1; 18	VCA; 2 Ret	CAS; 1 Ret	CAS; 2; 10	CUR; 1; 4	CUR; 2; 5	CUR; 1 Ret	CUR; 2; 24	GOI; 1; 7	GOI; 2; 2	GOI; 1; 24	GOI; 2; 4	VCA; 1; 15	VCA; 2 Ret	SCZ; 1; 2	SCZ; 2 DNS	INT; 1; 4	INT; 2; 17		15th	190
2022	Lubrax Podium	Chevrolet Cruze	INT; 1; 7^{9}	GOI; 1; 3	GOI; 2 Ret	RIO; 1; 24	RIO; 2; 23	VCA; 1; 12	VCA; 2 Ret	VEL; 1; 5	VEL; 2; 27	VEL; 1; 15	VEL; 2; 21	INT; 1; 26	INT; 2; 5	VCA; 1; 27	VCA; 2; 13	SCZ; 1; 6	SCZ; 2; 4	GOI; 1; 25	GOI; 2; 7	GOI; 1 Ret	GOI; 2; 6	INT; 1; 20	INT; 2 Ret			17th	148
2023	TMG Racing	Chevrolet Cruze	GOI; 1; 9	GOI; 2; 20	INT; 1 DSQ	INT; 2 DSQ	TAR; 1; 8	TAR; 2; 15	BRA; 1; 9	BRA; 2; 21	INT; 1; 24	INT; 2; 11	VCA; 1; 14	VCA; 2 Ret	GOI; 1; 20	GOI; 2 Ret	VEL; 1 Ret	VEL; 2; 12	BUE; 1; 17	BUE; 1; 16	VCA; 1; 6	VCA; 2; 7	BRA; 1; 4	BRA; 2; 9	INT; 1; 2	INT; 2; 19		15th	185
2024	Pole Motorsport	Chevrolet Cruze	GOI1; 1; 2	GOI1; 2; 6	MGG1; 1; 12	MGG1; 2 C	INT1; 1; 7	INT1; 2; 5	CSC; 1; 11	CSC; 2; 26	MGG2; 1; 12	MGG2; 2; 11	**MGG2**; **3**; 1	GOI2; 1; 2	GOI2; 2; 9	BLH; 1; 14	BLH; 2; 18	VEL; 1 Ret	VEL; 2; 3	BUA; 1 Ret	BUA; 2; 11	ELP; 1; 11	ELP; 2; 8	GOI3; 1; 11	GOI3; 2; 10	INT2; 1; 3	INT2; 2; 25†	5th	835
