= Átila Abreu =

Brazilian racing driver

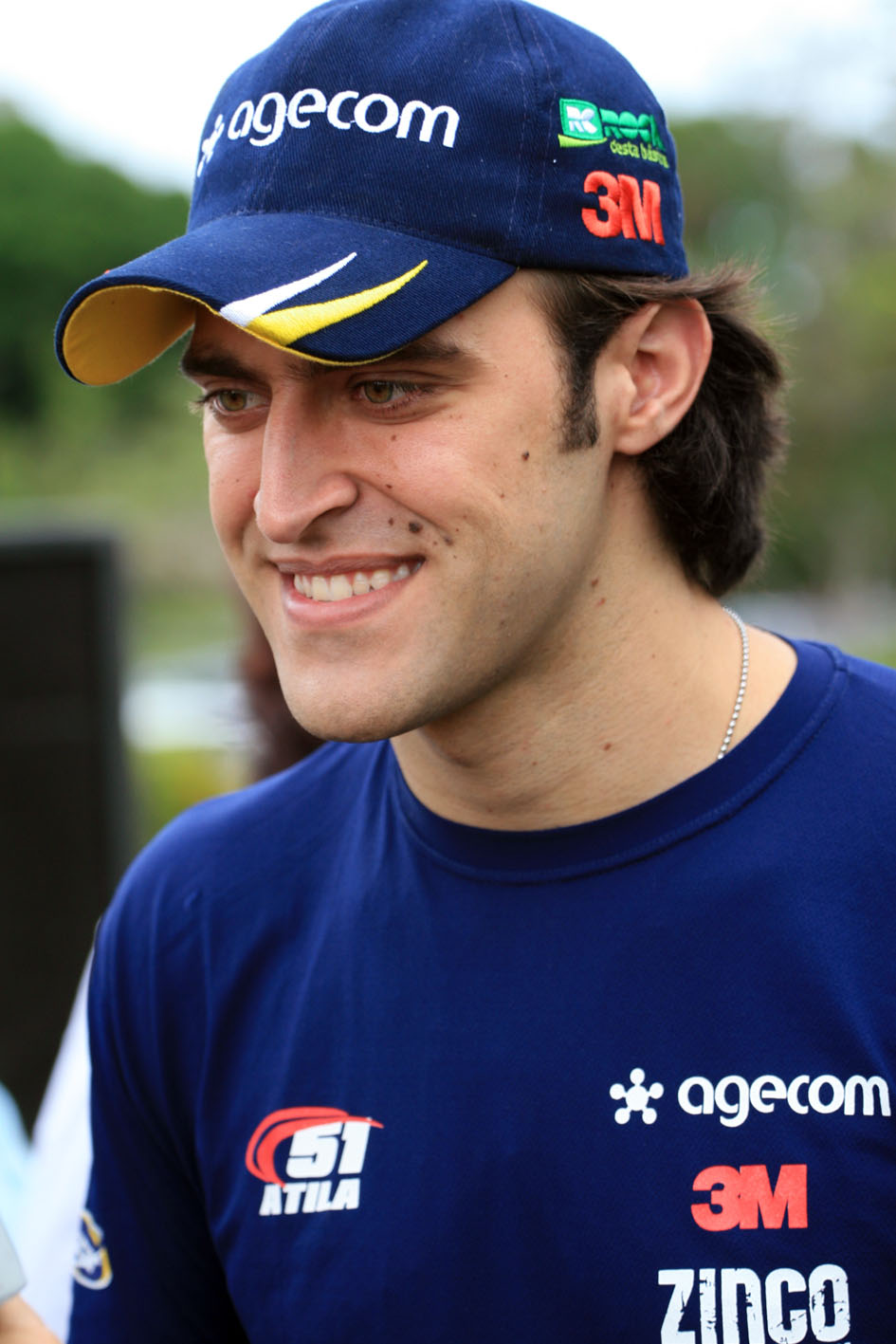
- Abreu in 2009
- Nationality: (Brazil) Brazilian
- Born: Átila Roberto de Abreu; 10 May 1987 (age 39) Sorocaba (Brazil)

Stock Car Brasil career
- Debut season: 2006
- Current team: Shell Racing
- Categorisation: FIA Gold (until 2022); FIA Silver (2023–)
- Car number: 51
- Starts: 238
- Championships: 0
- Wins: 17
- Poles: 10
- Fastest laps: 4

Previous series
- 2017 2007 2005 2003–2004: Stadium Super Trucks; GT3 Brasil Championship; Formula 3 Euro Series; Formula BMW ADAC

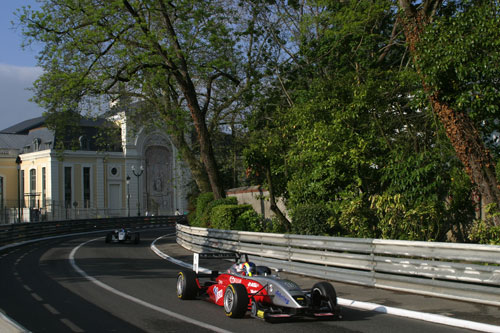
Abreu driving in the Pau Grand Prix in 2005

Átila Roberto de Abreu (born 10 May 1987 in Sorocaba) is a Brazilian racing driver currently competing for Pole Motorsport in the Stock Car Pro Series.

== Career ==
=== Formula BMW ===
Despite beginning his karting career in 1996, 2003 saw his debut in the Formula BMW ADAC championship with Team Rosberg. Abreu finished ninth in the championship and second in the Rookie Cup with two podiums at Norisring and A1-Ring. He switched teams, joining ADAC Mittelrhein e.V. for 2004 and finished the season as runner-up with two wins at Adria International Raceway and Nürburgring.

=== Formula Three ===
In 2005, Abreu stepped up to the Formula 3 Euro Series with Mücke Motorsport. He finished fifteenth in the standings after taking seven point-scoring finishes.

=== Stock Car Brasil ===
After competitions in Europe, Abreu returned to Brazil to participate in local series, including Stock Car Brasil. In 2008, he competed in Stock Car V8, JF Racing team and was elected the pilot surprise team, which finished in eighth place. In 2010, Abreu won the first race of his career in Stock Car.

=== Stadium Super Trucks ===
In 2017, Abreu made his Stadium Super Trucks debut at the Detroit Grand Prix, the first Brazilian to compete in the series. He drove the No. 51 truck with sponsorship from Royal Dutch Shell and Monster Energy, the former being his Stock Car Brasil team, while Monster was a sponsor of his in 2013. Abreu finished eleventh in the first race after being involved in an accident on lap five, though he was able to finish the second event in eighth.

== Racing record ==
=== Career summary ===
Season	Series	Team	Races	Wins	Poles	F/Laps	Podiums	Points	Position
2003	Formula BMW ADAC	Team Rosberg	20	0	0	0	2	77	9th
2004	Formula BMW ADAC	Eifelland Racing	20	2	1	3	15	263	**2nd**
2005	Formula 3 Euro Series	Mücke Motorsport	20	0	0	0	0	12	15th
2005	Masters of Formula 3	Mücke Motorsport	1	0	0	0	0	NA	15th
2006	Stock Car Brasil	RC Competições	3	0	0	0	0	0	NC
2007	Stock Car Brasil	Sama-GomeSports	3	0	0	0	0	0	NC
2007	GT3 Brasil Championship	RC Competições	2	0	0	0	1	11	15th
2008	Stock Car Brasil	JF Racing	12	0	0	1	1	217	8th
2008	Copa Vicar	W2 Racing	1	0	0	0	0	0	NC
2009	Stock Car Brasil	AMG Motorsport	12	0	1	0	3	243	7th
2010	Stock Car Brasil	AMG Motorsport	12	1	1	0	5	234	5th
2011	Stock Car Brasil	AMG Motorsport	12	2	0	0	4	219	10th
2011	Brasileiro de Marcas	AMG Motorsport	10	0	0	1	2	67	12th
2012	Stock Car Brasil	Mobil Super Pioneer Racing	12	1	2	0	4	175	**3rd**
2013	Stock Car Brasil	Mobil Super Pioneer Racing	12	1	3	2	1	99	11th
2013	FIA GT Series	BMW Sports Trophy Team Brasil	2	0	0	0	0	8	19th
2014	Stock Car Brasil	Mobil Super Racing	21	1	1	0	6	223.5	**2nd**
2015	Stock Car Brasil	AMG Motorsport	23	1	0	1	2	155	10th
2015	Blancpain Endurance Series	BMW Sports Trophy Team Brasil	4	0	0	0	0	2	26th
2015	Blancpain GT Sprint Series	BMW Sports Trophy Team Brasil	12	0	0	0	4	74	7th
2016	Stock Car Brasil	Shell Racing	23	1	0	1	3	187	8th
2017	Stock Car Brasil	Shell Racing	23	2	1	0	6	256	4th
2017	Stadium Super Trucks	Shell/Monster Energy	2	0	0	0	0	23	27th
2018	Stock Car Brasil	Shell V-Power	23	4	0	0	5	208	6th
2019	Stock Car Brasil	Shell V-Power	17	1	0	0	3	164	12th
2019	Porsche Endurance Series	N/A	3	2	2	1	3	230	**1st**
2020	Stock Car Brasil	Shell V-Power	18	0	0	0	0	158	15th
2020	Império Endurance Brasil - GT4	AMG	6	3	2	2	6	595	**1st**
2020	Michelin Pilot Challenge - Grand Sport	MMC Motorsport	1	0	0	0	0	11	66th
2020	Porsche Endurance Series	N/A	3	0	0	0	1	173	4th
2021	Stock Car Pro Series	Shell W-Power	24	2	0	0	3	255	8th
2021	Império Endurance Brasil - GT4	AMG CAC Competições	4	3	2	3	3	330	5th
2021	Porsche Endurance Series	N/A	2	0	0	0	0	0	NC
2022	Stock Car Pro Series	Shell W-Power	5	0	0	0	0	0	-*
2022	24H GT Series - 992	Fach Auto Tech	2	0	0	0	0	15	9th*
2023	24H GT Series - GT3	BMW Italia Ceccato Racing							

^{*} Season still in progress.

=== Complete Formula 3 Euro Series results ===
(key) (Races in bold indicate pole position) (Races in italics indicate fastest lap)

Year	Entrant	Chassis	Engine	1	2	3	4	5	6	7	8	9	10	11	12	13	14	15	16	17	18	19	20	DC	Points
2005	Mücke Motorsport	Dallara F305/028	Mercedes	HOC; 1; 8	HOC; 2; 9	PAU; 1; 11	PAU; 2; 12	SPA; 1 DSQ	SPA; 2; 12	MON; 1 Ret	MON; 2; 11	OSC; 1; 8	OSC; 2; 10	NOR; 1; 9	NOR; 2; 10	NÜR; 1; 7	NÜR; 2; 17	ZAN; 1; 5	ZAN; 2; 8	LAU; 1; 7	LAU; 2; 12	HOC; 3; 8	HOC; 4 Ret	15th	12

=== Complete Stock Car Brasil results ===
Year	Team	Car	1	2	3	4	5	6	7	8	9	10	11	12	13	14	15	16	17	18	19	20	21	Rank	Points
2006	RS Competições	Chevrolet Astra	INT	CTB	CGD	INT	LON	CTB	SCZ	BSB	TAR	ARG; 30	RIO; 18	INT; 25										NC	0
2007	Sama-GomeSports	Volkswagen Bora	INT	CTB	CGD	INT	LON	SCZ; DNQ	CTB; DNQ	BSB; DNQ	ARG	TAR	RIO	INT										NC	0
2008	JF Racing	Peugeot 307	INT; 6	BSB; Ret	CTB; 4	SCZ; Ret	CGD; 3	INT; 12	RIO; 10	LON; 9	CTB; 9	BSB; 20	TAR; Ret	INT; 18										8th	217
2009	AMG Motorsport	Chevrolet Vectra	INT; 7	CTB; Ret	BSB; 3	SCZ; 3	INT; 12	SAL; Ret	RIO; 4	**CGD**; 3	CTB; 7	BSB; 10	TAR; 7	INT; 15										7th	243
2010	AMG Motorsport	Chevrolet Vectra	INT; 2	CTB; 7	VEL; 2	RIO; 2	**RBP**; 1	SAL; Ret	INT; 3	CGD; 16	LON; Ret	SCZ; 4	BSB; Ret	CTB; 19										5th	234
2011	AMG Motorsport	Chevrolet Vectra	CTB; 4	INT; 9	RBP; 1	VEL; 1	CGD; Ret	RIO; 23	INT; 5	SAL; 3	SCZ; Ret	LON; DSQ	BSB; 23	VEL; 13										10th	219
2012	Mobil Super Pioneer Racing	Chevrolet Sonic	INT; 5	CTB; 3	VEL; Ret	RBP; 3	LON; 13	RIO; Ret	SAL; 6	**CAS**; 4	TAR; 2	**CTB**; 1	BSB; 6	INT; 8										**3rd**	**178**
2013	Mobil Super Pioneer Racing	Chevrolet Sonic	INT; 12	CUR; 8	TAR; 18	**SAL**; 23	BRA; DSQ	CAS; Ret	**RBP**; 10	CAS; 28	VEL; Ret	**CUR**; 1	BRA; 6	INT; 9										11th	99
2014	Mobil Super Pioneer Racing	Chevrolet Sonic	INT; 1; 6	SCZ; 1; 26	SCZ; 2; 7	BRA; 1; 1	BRA; 2; 20	**GOI**; **1**; 2	GOI; 2; 22	GOI; 1; 4	CAS; 1; 3	CAS; 2; 5	CUR; 1; 4	CUR; 2; 8	VEL; 1; 8	VEL; 2; 2	SAL; 1; 22	SAL; 2; 20	TAR; 1; 19	TAR; 2; 7	RBP; 1; 3	RBP; 2; 5	CUR; 1; 2	**2nd**	**223.5**
