= 2021 Stock Car Pro Series =

Car racing competition

2021 Stock Car Brasil Championship

Seasons
- ← 2020 2022 →

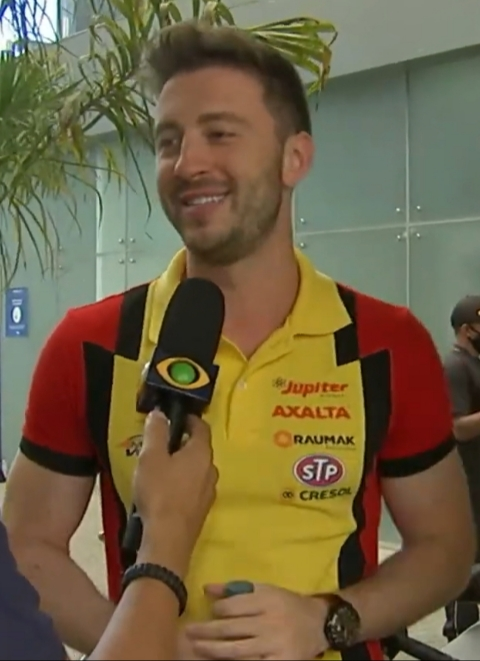
Gabriel Casagrande, was the 2021 champion.

The 2021 Stock Car Pro Series was the forty-third season of Stock Car Brasil. Gabriel Casagrande of A.Mattheis Vogel Motorsport won the Drivers' Championship for the first time in his career. The 3-time champion Daniel Serra of Eurofarma RC finished runner up. Eurofarma RC won the Teams' Championship.

== Teams and drivers ==
Team	Car	No.	Drivers	Rounds
Crown Racing	Chevrolet Cruze Stock Car	0	(Brazil) Cacá Bueno	All
Crown Racing	Chevrolet Cruze Stock Car	88	(Brazil) Beto Monteiro	All
Lubrax Podium	Chevrolet Cruze Stock Car	4	(Brazil) Júlio Campos	All
Lubrax Podium	Chevrolet Cruze Stock Car	91	(Brazil) Felipe Massa	All
Cavaleiro Sports	Chevrolet Cruze Stock Car	5	(Brazil) Denis Navarro	All
Cavaleiro Sports	Chevrolet Cruze Stock Car	80	(Brazil) Marcos Gomes	All
Full Time Bassani	Toyota Corolla Stock Car	7	(Brazil) Pietro Fittipaldi	7
Full Time Bassani	Toyota Corolla Stock Car	8	(Brazil) Rafael Suzuki	All
Full Time Bassani	Toyota Corolla Stock Car	48	(Brazil) Tony Kanaan	1–6, 8–12
Full Time Sports	Toyota Corolla Stock Car	65	(Brazil) Max Wilson	1
Full Time Sports	Toyota Corolla Stock Car	111	(Brazil) Rubens Barrichello	All
Full Time Sports	Toyota Corolla Stock Car	117	(Argentina) Matías Rossi	2–4, 6, 8–12
Full Time Sports	Toyota Corolla Stock Car	191	(Brazil) Eduardo Barrichello	5, 7
A.Mattheis Vogel	Chevrolet Cruze Stock Car	9	(Brazil) Gustavo Lima	All
A.Mattheis Vogel	Chevrolet Cruze Stock Car	83	(Brazil) Gabriel Casagrande	All
RCM Motorsport	Toyota Corolla Stock Car	10	(Brazil) Ricardo Zonta	All
RCM Motorsport	Toyota Corolla Stock Car	44	(Brazil) Bruno Baptista	All
KTF Racing	Chevrolet Cruze Stock Car	11	(Brazil) Gaetano di Mauro	All
KTF Racing	Chevrolet Cruze Stock Car	43	(Brazil) Pedro Cardoso	All
KTF Sports	Chevrolet Cruze Stock Car	12	(Brazil) Lucas Foresti	All
KTF Sports	Chevrolet Cruze Stock Car	85	(Brazil) Guilherme Salas	All
Eurofarma RC	Chevrolet Cruze Stock Car	13	(Portugal) António Félix da Costa	2
Eurofarma RC	Chevrolet Cruze Stock Car	29	(Brazil) Daniel Serra	All
Eurofarma RC	Chevrolet Cruze Stock Car	90	(Brazil) Ricardo Maurício	1, 3–12
Blau TMG	Chevrolet Cruze Stock Car	16	(Brazil) Christian Hahn	All
Blau TMG	Chevrolet Cruze Stock Car	116	(Brazil) Marcelo Hahn	12
Blau Motorsport	Chevrolet Cruze Stock Car	18	(Brazil) Allam Khodair	All
Blau Motorsport	Chevrolet Cruze Stock Car	70	(Brazil) Diego Nunes	All
Ipiranga Racing	Toyota Corolla Stock Car	21	(Brazil) Thiago Camilo	All
Ipiranga Racing	Toyota Corolla Stock Car	30	(Brazil) César Ramos	All
Shell V-Power	Chevrolet Cruze Stock Car	28	(Brazil) Galid Osman	All
Shell V-Power	Chevrolet Cruze Stock Car	51	(Brazil) Átila Abreu	All
MX Piquet Sports	Toyota Corolla Stock Car	33	(Brazil) Nelson Piquet Jr.	1–7
MX Piquet Sports	Toyota Corolla Stock Car	73	(Brazil) Sérgio Jimenez	1–7
RKL Competições	Chevrolet Cruze Stock Car	37	(Brazil) Raphael Teixeira	8–9
RKL Competições	Chevrolet Cruze Stock Car	86	(Brazil) Gustavo Frigotto	1–5, 10–12
Hot Car Competições	Chevrolet Cruze Stock Car	54	(Brazil) Tuca Antoniazi	1–10, 12
Hot Car Competições	Chevrolet Cruze Stock Car	77	(Brazil) Valdeno Brito	11
Hot Car Competições	Chevrolet Cruze Stock Car	110	(Brazil) Felipe Lapenna	All
Scuderia Chiarelli	Toyota Corolla Stock Car	73	(Brazil) Sérgio Jimenez	8–9, 11–12
Scuderia Chiarelli	Toyota Corolla Stock Car	128	(Brazil) Danilo Dirani	10

=== Team changes ===
- After the series increased the maximum race entries to 32 cars per race, Toyota Gazoo Racing Brasil upsized from eight cars to ten cars. Ex GP2 Series team MX Piquet Sports entered in the series with two Corolla Stock Cars., Stock Car Light team RKL Competições entered with a single car and a new team called Pole Motorsport joined the championship.
- Crown Racing downsized from four to two cars. The team finished their partnership with Shell Oil Company. Pole Motorsport and Shell joined forces to continue Shell V-Power Racing.
- KTF Sports upsized from two to fours cars, and Blau Motorsport/TMG Racing also upsized from two from three cars.
- After the death of owner Amadeu Rodrigues, Hot Car Competições was taken over by his daughters. After competing with a single car in 2020, the team returned to operating two cars.
- Rodolfo Mattheis' team separated from his father Andreas Mattheis due to conflicts with sponsors. R.Mattheis Motorsport was renamed Lubrax Podium while A.Mattheis Motorsport (Ipiranga Racing) now has Vogel Motorsport as a new customer team.

=== Driver changes ===
- Lubrax Podium announced ex-Formula One driver Felipe Massa and Júlio Campos, who returned to the team after one season.
- Atila Abreu and Galid Osman moved from Crown Racing to Pole Motorsport, but still drive under the Shell V-Power Racing name
- With Blau Motorsport upgrading to three cars, ex Euroformula Open Championship driver Christian Hanh debuted in the series with his father's team.
- KTF Racing expanded to four cars, with Lucas Foresti and Pedro Cardoso driving the two new entries.
- Hot Car expanded to two cars, with Felipe Lappenna joining the team.
- Nelson Piquet Jr. departed Full Time Sports and moved to his own team MX Piquet Sports alongside Sergio Jimenez, who returned to the championship after two years at the Jaguar I-Pace eTrophy. Piquet was replaced by Tony Kanaan at FTS.
- Vogel Motorsport announced Gabriel Casagrande and Gustavo Lima both returning to the team after leaving previously.
- Stock Car Light driver Gustavo Frigoto joined RKL Competições team for both to debut in the championship.
- Vitor Baptista and Vitor Genz did not return after competing part-time the previous season.

=== Mid-season changes ===
- Due to travel restrictions between Argentina and Brazil, Matias Rossi did not compete in three rounds, as follows: #1 (Goiânia), #5 (Cascavel) and #7 (Curitiba). The Argentine driver was replaced by Max Wilson in the first round, and by Dudu Barrichello in the fifth and seventh rounds, respectively.
- Ricardo Mauricio tested positive for COVID-19 in the second round and was replaced by Portuguese driver António Félix da Costa. Da Costa was ineligible to score points towards the drivers' championship due to a requirement that drivers competing for the championship must be registered with a South American FIA member organization.
- Gustavo Frigotto, diagnosed with COVID-19, did not participate in the sixth and seventh rounds. Due to a budget shortage, Gustavo Frigotto made room for Raphael Teixeira. The announcement of the exchange took place before round 8.
- Due to contractual issues in the United States, Tony Kanaan did not compete in the seventh round in Curitiba. The driver was replaced by Pietro Fittipaldi.
- Nelson Piquet Jr. and his team ended their participation in the current season just before the eighth round in order to focus in the 2022 season. MX Piquet Sports was replaced by TCR South America Touring Car Championship team Scuderia CJ, that maintains a structure and points in the team championship. Sergio Jimenez also owner of the team was the only driver announced.
- Sérgio Jimenez tested positive for COVID-19 and was replaced by Danilo Dirani in the tenth stage held in Mogi-Guaçu.
- Due to personal commitments, Tuca Antoniazi was replaced by Valdeno Brito in the eleventh round held in Santa Cruz do Sul.

== Schedule and race results ==
Round		Circuit	Date	Pole position	Fastest lap	Winning driver	Winning team
1	R1	Autódromo Internacional Ayrton Senna, Goiânia	April 25	(Brazil) Cacá Bueno	(Brazil) Ricardo Mauricio	(Brazil) Daniel Serra	Eurofarma RC
1	R2	Autódromo Internacional Ayrton Senna, Goiânia	April 25		(Brazil) Ricardo Mauricio	(Brazil) Ricardo Mauricio	Eurofarma RC
2	R1	Autódromo José Carlos Pace, São Paulo	May 16	(Brazil) Gabriel Casagrande	(Brazil) Gabriel Casagrande	(Brazil) Gabriel Casagrande	AMattheis Vogel
2	R2	Autódromo José Carlos Pace, São Paulo	May 16		(Brazil) Daniel Serra	(Portugal) António Félix da Costa	Eurofarma RC
3	R1	Autódromo Velo Città, Mogi Guaçu	June 19	(Brazil) Ricardo Zonta	(Brazil) Gabriel Casagrande	(Brazil) Gabriel Casagrande	AMattheis Vogel
3	R2	Autódromo Velo Città, Mogi Guaçu	June 19		(Brazil) Lucas Foresti	(Brazil) Lucas Foresti	KTF Sports
4	R1	Autódromo Velo Città, Mogi Guaçu	June 20	(Brazil) Rubens Barrichello	(Brazil) Rubens Barrichello	(Brazil) Rubens Barrichello	Full Time Sports
4	R2	Autódromo Velo Città, Mogi Guaçu	June 20		(Brazil) Lucas Foresti	(Brazil) Ricardo Zonta	RCM Motorsport
5	R1	Autódromo Internacional de Cascavel, Cascavel	July 11	(Brazil) Thiago Camilo	(Brazil) Thiago Camilo	(Brazil) Thiago Camilo	Ipiranga Racing
5	R2	Autódromo Internacional de Cascavel, Cascavel	July 11		(Brazil) Marcos Gomes	(Brazil) Átila Abreu	Shell V-Power
6	R1	Autódromo Internacional de Curitiba, Pinhais	August 1	(Brazil) Ricardo Mauricio	(Brazil) Daniel Serra	(Brazil) Ricardo Mauricio	Eurofarma RC
6	R2	Autódromo Internacional de Curitiba, Pinhais	August 1		(Brazil) Ricardo Zonta	(Brazil) Thiago Camilo	Ipiranga Racing
7	R1	Autódromo Internacional de Curitiba, Pinhais	August 8	(Brazil) Rafael Suzuki	(Brazil) Daniel Serra	(Brazil) Rafael Suzuki	Full Time Bassani
7	R2	Autódromo Internacional de Curitiba, Pinhais	August 8		(Brazil) Marcos Gomes	(Brazil) Átila Abreu	Shell V-Power
8	R1	Autódromo Internacional Ayrton Senna, Goiânia	September 18	(Brazil) Rubens Barrichello	(Brazil) Júlio Campos	(Brazil) Rubens Barrichello	Full Time Sports
8	R2	Autódromo Internacional Ayrton Senna, Goiânia	September 18		(Brazil) Ricardo Mauricio	(Brazil) Ricardo Mauricio	Eurofarma RC
9	R1	Autódromo Internacional Ayrton Senna, Goiânia	September 19	(Brazil) Ricardo Mauricio	(Brazil) Allam Khodair	(Brazil) Ricardo Mauricio	Eurofarma RC
9	R2	Autódromo Internacional Ayrton Senna, Goiânia	September 19		(Brazil) Ricardo Mauricio	(Brazil) Ricardo Mauricio	Eurofarma RC
10	R1	Autódromo Velo Città, Mogi Guaçu	October 24	(Brazil) Guilherme Salas	(Brazil) Guilherme Salas	(Brazil) Guilherme Salas	KTF Sports
10	R2	Autódromo Velo Città, Mogi Guaçu	October 24		(Brazil) Allam Khodair	(Brazil) Thiago Camilo	Ipiranga Racing
11	R1	Autódromo Internacional de Santa Cruz do Sul, Santa Cruz do Sul	November 21	(Brazil) Thiago Camilo	(Brazil) Thiago Camilo	(Brazil) Thiago Camilo	Ipiranga Racing
11	R2	Autódromo Internacional de Santa Cruz do Sul, Santa Cruz do Sul	November 21		(Brazil) Diego Nunes	(Brazil) Ricardo Mauricio	Eurofarma RC
12	R1	Autódromo José Carlos Pace, São Paulo	December 12	(Brazil) Gabriel Casagrande	(Brazil) Daniel Serra	(Brazil) Thiago Camilo	Ipiranga Racing
12	R2	Autódromo José Carlos Pace, São Paulo	December 12		(Brazil) Gabriel Casagrande	(Brazil) Ricardo Mauricio	Eurofarma RC

== Scoring system ==
Points are awarded for each race at an event to the driver/s of a car that completed at least 75% of the race distance and was running at the completion of the race. Before the last round, the four worst results are discarded.

Points format	Position																				
Points format	1st	2nd	3rd	4th	5th	6th	7th	8th	9th	10th	11th	12th	13th	14th	15th	16th	17th	18th	19th	20th	Pole
Feature races	30	26	22	19	17	15	14	13	12	11	10	9	8	7	6	5	4	3	2	1	2
Sprint races	24	20	18	17	16	15	14	13	12	11	10	9	8	7	6	5	4	3	2	1	

- Feature races Used for the first race of each event.
- Sprint races:The second race of each event, with partially reversed (top ten) grid.

== Standings ==
=== Drivers' Championship ===
Pos	Driver	GYN		SPA^{1}		MOG		MOG		CAC^{2}		CWB		CWB		GYN		GYN		MOG		SCZ		SPA		Pts
1	(Brazil) Gabriel Casagrande	(17)	3	**1**	Ret	1	Ret	3	13	3	3	3	11	3	2	3	(18)	14	3	10	2	4	6	**3**	3	378 (385)
2	(Brazil) Daniel Serra	1	5	24	2	7	10	4	6	4	11	2	8	2	6	(11)	10	(18)	Ret	5	4	5	10	2	4	354 (367)
3	(Brazil) Thiago Camilo	5	6	11	16	3	15	11	Ret	**1**	28	16	1	Ret	Ret	18	4	10	2	8	1	**1**	8	1	22	310
4	(Brazil) Ricardo Zonta	16	15	16	4	**2**	3	10	1	13	2	22	4	Ret	10	Ret	DNS	3	7	2	6	10	5	12	2	307
5	(Brazil) Ricardo Maurício	18	1			13	9	5	16	26	12	**1**	10	7	18	10	1	**1**	1	9	Ret	Ret	1	8	1	304
6	(Brazil) Rubens Barrichello	15	19	DSQ	DNS	4	2	**1**	2	5	14	6	6	8	Ret	**1**	8	5	15	16	9	9	3	22	18	282
7	(Brazil) Allam Khodair	14	Ret	2	18	11	21	7	8	6	22	26	9	11	21	6	6	2	19	6	3	3	8	5	7	270
8	(Brazil) Átila Abreu	8	10	5	6	Ret	7	14	14	7	1	Ret	Ret	10	1	8	3	23	5	13	Ret	13	11	13	6	255
9	(Brazil) César Ramos	3	8	4	11	5	12	13	3	2	16	7	21	Ret	14	2	Ret	7	14	3	Ret	19	19	23	Ret	245
10	(Brazil) Diego Nunes	13	14	6	14	9	4	2	9	14	6	Ret	Ret	19	16	Ret	DNS	9	6	4	11	7	14	20	11	226
11	(Brazil) Marcos Gomes	22	Ret	Ret	Ret	18	Ret	8	18	17	4	5	7	6	7	4	7	4	8	11	18	20	15	7	5	216
12	(Brazil) Denis Navarro	6	4	7	8	14	8	17	5	25	9	Ret	17	14	3	15	16	8	Ret	21	5	14	4	26	21	206
13	(Brazil) Bruno Baptista	4	7	3	10	8	17	Ret	DNS	10	7	10	3	13	11	5	12	Ret	Ret	22	Ret	Ret	7	16	Ret	203
14	(Brazil) Guilherme Salas	9	9	26	3	10	18	9	7	27	5	11	18	4	25	Ret	DNS	20	Ret	**1**	7	21	Ret	DSQ	9	192
15	(Brazil) Júlio Campos	11	Ret	17	17	21	6	18	Ret	Ret	10	4	5	Ret	24	7	2	24	4	15	Ret	2	DNS	4	17	190
16	(Brazil) Rafael Suzuki	12	16	12	15	6	11	15	21	8	27	9	24	**1**	5	16	14	22	10	23	14	23	2	21	Ret	185
17	(Brazil) Cacá Bueno	**2**	21	Ret	5	Ret	19	12	Ret	23	17	8	13	9	4	19	11	17	9	20	12	15	Ret	9	23	167
18	(Brazil) Gaetano di Mauro	7	2	27	Ret	20	Ret	Ret	4	Ret	8	18	2	24	Ret	9	5	16	16	7	8	26	Ret	DSQ	13	161
19	(Brazil) Galid Osman	19	11	10	9	Ret	Ret	19	20	28	21	13	Ret	Ret	Ret	13	9	11	11	18	15	6	12	10	Ret	132
20	(Argentina) Matías Rossi			19	21	16	5	6	10			19	15			Ret	DNS	6	12	17	16	22	Ret	6	8	120
21	(Brazil) Lucas Foresti	10	12	29	Ret	17	1	27	Ret	24	26	12	Ret	21	15	Ret	DNS	13	17	14	10	8	18	24	Ret	113
22	(Brazil) Pedro Cardoso	20	13	8	Ret	24	DNS	22	17	20	20	17	20	15	17	Ret	DNS	19	18	12	21	11	13	15	14	91
23	(Brazil) Felipe Lapenna	Ret	DNS	20	Ret	15	13	Ret	Ret	9	29	21	12	5	22	12	Ret	27	Ret	26	13	16	Ret	Ret	10	89
24	(Brazil) Felipe Massa	25	17	15	7	Ret	Ret	16	15	16	13	15	23	Ret	13	Ret	13	26	20	Ret	20	17	Ret	19	16	88
25	(Brazil) Gustavo Lima	Ret	DNS	14	DSQ	25	DNS	24	12	15	Ret	14	19	16	23	Ret	15	12	13	Ret	17	Ret	Ret	11	20	75
26	(Brazil) Beto Monteiro	Ret	DNS	22	19	23	14	25	11	11	Ret	24	16	Ret	12	Ret	DNS	Ret	Ret	25	23	24	Ret	Ret	DNS	46
27	(Brazil) Christian Hahn	Ret	18	13	Ret	26	16	Ret	19	22	18	Ret	14	20	Ret	Ret	DNS	WD	WD	28	Ret	18	Ret	18	15	45
28	(Brazil) Sérgio Jimenez	Ret	20	18	Ret	12	Ret	DNS	DNS	Ret	24	Ret	DNS	23	DNS	14	Ret	15	Ret			Ret	Ret	27	12	36
29	(Brazil) Gustavo Frigotto	21	Ret	23	Ret	19	20	20	Ret	12	23									24	Ret	Ret	16	14	19	27
30	(Brazil) Nelson Piquet Jr.	24	DNS	28	13	Ret	22	23	Ret	Ret	19	25	25	12	19											24
31	(Brazil) Tuca Antoniazi	23	22	25	20	Ret	Ret	26	22	18	30	20	26	22	20	17	17	25	DSQ	19	22			17	Ret	24
32	(Brazil) Tony Kanaan	Ret	DNS	21	12	22	Ret	21	Ret	21	15	23	22			Ret	DNS	21	Ret	27	19	25	17	25	Ret	24
33	(Brazil) Max Wilson	Ret	DNS																							0
34	(Brazil) Danilo Dirani																			29	Ret					0
Drivers ineligible to score points
	(Portugal) António Félix da Costa			9	1																					0
	(Brazil) Eduardo Barrichello									19	25			18	9											0
	(Brazil) Pietro Fittipaldi													17	8											0
	(Brazil) Raphael Teixeira															Ret	DNS	WD	WD							0
	(Brazil) Valdeno Brito																					12	DNS			0
	(Brazil) Marcelo Hahn																							Ret	Ret	0
Pos	Driver	GYN		SPA^{1}		MOG		MOG		CAC^{2}		CWB		CWB		GYN		GYN		VCA		SCZ		SPA		Pts

Colour	Result
Gold	Winner
Silver	Second place
Bronze	Third place
Green	Points classification
Blue	Non-points classification
Blue	Non-classified finish (NC)
Purple	Retired, not classified (Ret)
Red	Did not qualify (DNQ)
Red	Did not pre-qualify (DNPQ)
Black	Disqualified (DSQ)
White	Did not start (DNS)
White	Withdrew (WD)
White	Race cancelled (C)
Blank	Did not practice (DNP)
Blank	Did not arrive (DNA)
Blank	Excluded (EX)

**Bold** – Pole position
Italics – Fastest lap
† – Retired, but classified

^{1} As António Félix da Costa was ineligible to score points, his finishing position was ignored when scoring points of other competitors.

^{2} As Dudu Barrichello was ineligible to score points, his finishing position was ignored when scoring points of other competitors.

=== Teams' Championship ===
Round	Team	#	GYN		SPA		MOG		MOG		CAC		CWB		CWB		GYN		GYN		MOG		SCZ		SPA		Points
1	Eurofarma RC	29	1	5	24	2	7	10	4	6	4	11	2	8	2	6	11	10	18	Ret	5	4	5	10	2	4	637
1	Eurofarma RC	90	18	1			13	9	5	16	26	12	**1**	10	7	18	10	1	**1**	1	9	Ret	Ret	1	8	1	637
2	Ipiranga Racing	21	5	6	11	16	3	15	11	Ret	**1**	28	16	1	Ret	Ret	18	4	10	2	8	1	**1**	8	1	22	523
2	Ipiranga Racing	30	3	8	4	11	5	12	13	3	2	16	7	21	Ret	14	2	Ret	7	14	3	Ret	19	19	23	Ret	523
3	Blau Motorsport	18	14	Ret	2	18	11	21	7	8	6	22	26	9	11	21	6	6	2	19	6	3	3	8	5	7	466
3	Blau Motorsport	70	13	14	6	14	9	4	2	9	14	6	Ret	Ret	19	16	Ret	DNS	9	6	4	11	7	14	20	11	466
4	RCM Motorsport	10	16	15	16	4	**2**	3	10	1	13	2	22	4	Ret	10	Ret	DNS	3	7	2	6	10	5	12	2	464
4	RCM Motorsport	44	4	7	3	10	8	17	Ret	DNS	10	7	10	3	13	11	5	12	Ret	Ret	22	Ret	Ret	7	16	Ret	464
5	AMattheis Vogel	9	Ret	DNS	14	DSQ	25	DNS	24	12	15	Ret	14	19	16	23	Ret	15	12	13	Ret	17	Ret	Ret	11	20	446
5	AMattheis Vogel	83	17	3	**1**	Ret	1	Ret	3	13	3	3	3	11	3	2	3	18	14	3	10	2	4	6	**3**	3	446
6	Full Time Sports	111	15	19	DSQ	DNS	4	2	**1**	2	5	14	6	6	8	Ret	**1**	8	5	15	16	9	9	3	22	18	409
6	Full Time Sports	117			19	21	16	5	6	10			19	15			Ret	DNS	6	12	17	16	22	Ret	6	8	409
7	Cavaleiro Sports	5	6	4	7	8	14	8	17	5	25	9	Ret	17	14	3	15	16	8	Ret	21	5	14	4	26	21	387
7	Cavaleiro Sports	80	22	Ret	Ret	Ret	18	Ret	8	18	17	4	5	7	6	7	4	7	4	8	11	18	20	15	7	5	387
8	Shell V-Power	28	19	11	10	9	Ret	Ret	19	20	28	21	13	Ret	Ret	Ret	13	9	11	11	18	15	6	12	10	Ret	369
8	Shell V-Power	51	8	10	5	6	Ret	7	14	14	7	1	Ret	Ret	10	1	8	3	23	5	13	Ret	13	11	13	6	369
9	KTF Sports	12	10	12	29	Ret	17	1	27	Ret	24	26	12	Ret	21	15	Ret	DNS	13	17	14	10	8	18	24	Ret	298
9	KTF Sports	85	9	9	26	3	10	18	9	7	27	5	11	18	4	25	Ret	DNS	20	Ret	**1**	7	21	Ret	EX	9	298
10	Lubrax Podium	4	11	Ret	17	17	21	6	18	Ret	Ret	10	4	5	Ret	24	7	2	24	4	15	Ret	2	NL	4	17	271
10	Lubrax Podium	91	25	17	15	7	Ret	Ret	16	15	16	13	15	23	Ret	13	Ret	13	26	20	Ret	20	17	Ret	19	16	271
11	KTF Racing	11	7	2	27	Ret	20	Ret	Ret	4	Ret	8	18	2	24	Ret	9	5	16	16	7	8	26	Ret	EX	13	248
11	KTF Racing	43	20	13	8	Ret	24	DNS	22	17	20	20	17	20	15	17	Ret	DNS	19	18	12	21	11	13	15	14	248
12	Full Time Bassani	8	12	16	12	15	6	11	15	21	8	27	9	24	**1**	5	16	14	22	10	23	14	23	2	21	Ret	221
12	Full Time Bassani	48	Ret	DNS	21	12	22	Ret	21	Ret	21	15	23	22			Ret	DNS	21	Ret	27	19	25	17	25	Ret	221
13	Crown Racing	0	**2**	21	Ret	5	Ret	19	12	Ret	23	17	8	13	9	4	19	11	17	9	20	12	15	Ret	9	23	208
13	Crown Racing	88	Ret	DNS	22	19	23	14	25	11	11	Ret	24	16	Ret	12	Ret	DNS	Ret	Ret	25	23	24	Ret	Ret	DNS	208
14	Hot Car Competições	54	23	22	25	20	Ret	Ret	26	22	18	30	20	26	22	20	17	17	25	DSQ	19	22			17	Ret	115
14	Hot Car Competições	110	Ret	DNS	20	Ret	15	13	Ret	Ret	9	29	21	12	5	22	12	Ret	27	Ret	26	13	16	Ret	Ret	10	115
15	MX Piquet Sports; Scuderia CJ	33	24	DNS	28	13	Ret	22	23	Ret	Ret	19	25	25	12	19											56
15	MX Piquet Sports; Scuderia CJ	73	Ret	20	18	Ret	12	Ret	DNS	DNS	Ret	24	Ret	DNS	23	DNS	14	Ret	15	Ret			Ret	Ret	27	12	56
16	Blau Motorsport II	16	Ret	18	13	Ret	26	16	Ret	19	22	18	Ret	14	20	Ret	Ret	DNS			28	Ret	18	Ret	18	15	41
17	RKL Competições	86	21	Ret	23	Ret	19	20	20	Ret	12	23									24	Ret	Ret	16	14	19	27
Round	Team	#	GYN		SPA		MOG		MOG		CAC		CWB		CWB		GYN		GYN		MOG		SCZ		SPA		Points

=== Manufacturers' Championship ===
#	Constructor	GYN			SPA			MOG			MOG			CAC			CWB			CWB			GYN			GYN			MOG			SCZ			SPA			Points
#	Constructor	Q	C1	C2	Q	C1	C2	Q	C1	C2	Q	C1	C2	Q	C1	C2	Q	C1	C2	Q	C1	C2	Q	C1	C2	Q	C1	C2	Q	C1	C2	Q	C1	C2	Q	C1	C2	Points
1	(United States) Chevrolet	2	56	44	2	56	44	0	44	41	0	48	33	0	41	42	2	36	56	0	48	44	0	41	44	2	56	42	2	49	38	0	48	41	2	48	42	1172
2	(Japan) Toyota	0	41	29	0	41	30	2	48	38	2	45	44	2	56	34	0	42	29	2	43	29	2	56	30	0	39	34	0	48	39	2	42	38	0	45	33	965
		GYN			SPA			MOG			MOG			CAC			CWB			CWB			GYN			GYN			MOG			SCZ			SPA			

Summary
	(United States) Chevrolet	(Japan) Toyota
Pole position	**6**	**6**
Fastest lap	**20**	4
Wins	**15**	9
Points	**1172**	965

== Broadcasting ==
TV (Brazil only)	Internet (Global)
Band	YouTube
SportTV	Motorsport.tv
TV (Russia only)	Facebook
Моторспорт ТВ	Zoome
	Catve.com
	Auto Videos
	Twitch

== Simulation games ==
- Automobilista 2. Reiza Studios. Brazil. An advanced racing simulator which is very popular among the virtual motorsport community.
- Stock Car Extreme. Reiza Studios. Brazil. A realistic racing game simulating Brazilian Stock Car V8 series, also featuring several extra series and tracks covering a wide variety of racing disciplines.
