= Vogel Motorsport =

(Brazil) Vogel Motorsport
- Founded: 1985
- Base: Petrópólis, Rio de Janeiro
- Team principal(s): Mauro Vogel
- Current series: Stock Car Brasil
- Noted drivers: 83. Gabriel Casagrande; 12. Lucas Foresti
- Drivers' Championships: 2021, 2023, 2024 Gabriel Casagrande
- Website: http://www.vogelmotorsport.com.br.com/

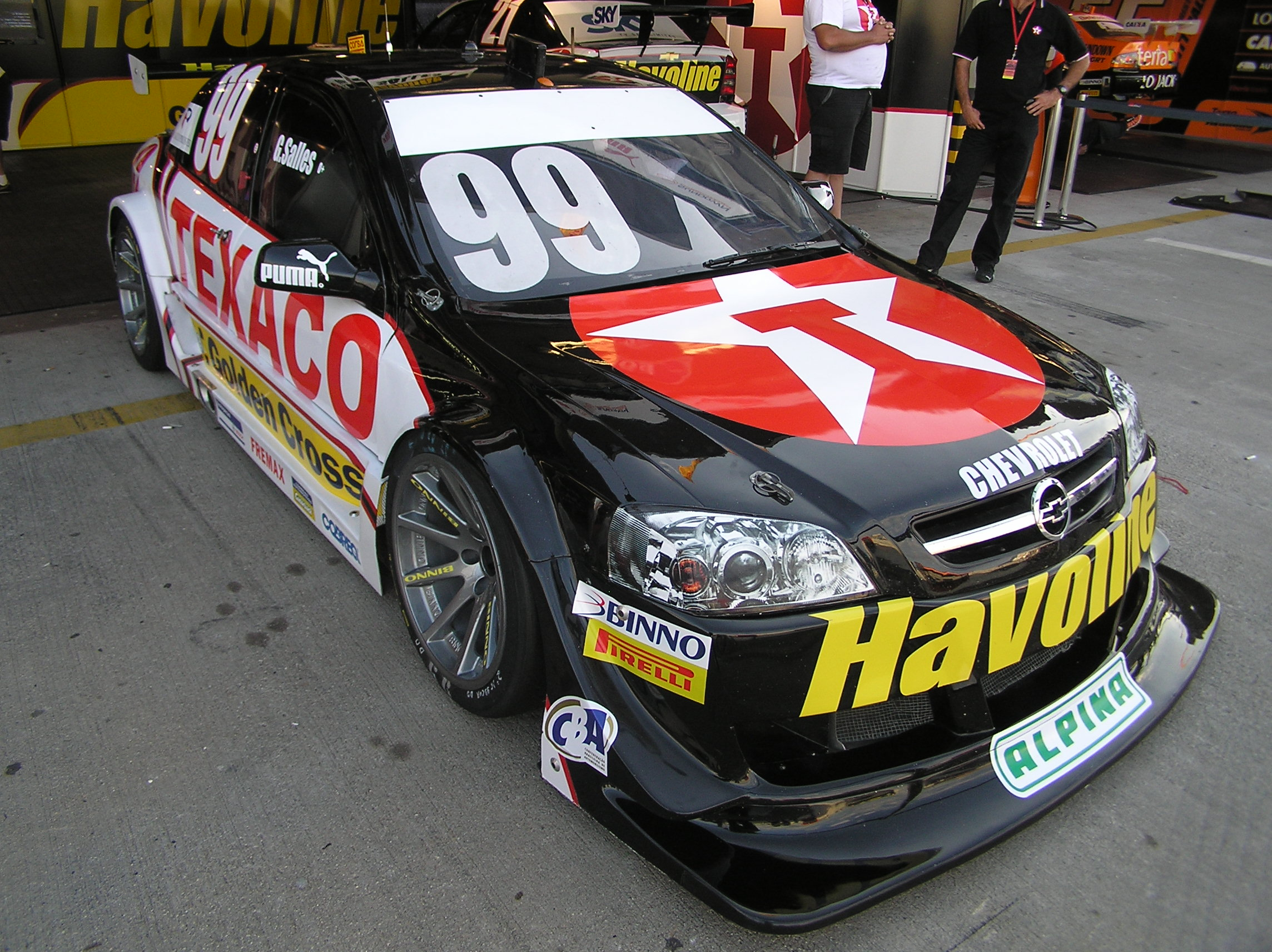
2006 Vogel car.

Vogel Motorsport currently competing under A.Mattheis Vogel name, due a technical alliance with A.Mattheis Motorsport is a Brazilian auto racing team based in Petropolis, Rio de Janeiro that currently competes in the Stock Car Pro Series with the Chevrolet Cruze. The team's drivers are defending champion Gabriel Casagrande and Lucas Foresti.
