= RMattheis Motorsport =

(Brazil) R.Mattheis Motorsport
- Founded: 2013
- Team principal(s): Rodolpho Mattheis
- Current series: Stock Car Pro Series
- Noted drivers: Júlio Campos; Valdeno Brito; Felipe Massa; Júlio Campos

RMattheis Motorsport, is a Brazilian auto racing team based in Petropolis, Rio de Janeiro. The team currently competes in Stock Car Brasil with Felipe Fraga and Allam Khodair using the Chevrolet Cruze, Allam Khodair also competes for the team in Império Endurance Brasil together with Marcelo Hahn, they drive a McLaren 720S GT3. The team also competes in the Sertões Rally, and the Mitsubishi Cup. R.Mattheis was founded in 2013 by Rodolpho Mattheis.

== Current series results ==
=== Stock Car Pro Series ===
Year	Chassis	Tyres	Drivers	Races	Wins	Poles	F. Laps	Podiums	D.C.	Pts	T.C.	Pts
2021	Chevrolet Cruze Stock Car	P	(Brazil) Allam Khodair	24	0	0	2	3	7th	270	N/A	541
2021	Chevrolet Cruze Stock Car	P	(Brazil) Christian Hahn	24	0	0	0	0	27th	45	N/A	541
2021	Chevrolet Cruze Stock Car	P	(Brazil) Diego Nunes	24	0	0	1	1	10th	226	N/A	541
2021	Chevrolet Cruze Stock Car	P	(Brazil) Marcelo Hahn	1	0	0	0	0	Ineligible	0	N/A	541
2022	Chevrolet Cruze Stock Car	P	(Brazil) Allam Khodair	23	0	0	1	0	18th	148	N/A	306
2022	Chevrolet Cruze Stock Car	P	(Brazil) Diego Nunes	23	1	0	1	2	16th	158	N/A	306

== See also ==
- A.Mattheis Motorsport
- WA Mattheis
