= Copa Fiat Brasil =

One-make racing series by Fiat based in Brazil

- Category: One-make by Fiat
- Country: Brazil
- Inaugural season: 2010
- Folded: 2012
- Drivers: 30 (2012)
- Teams: 12 (2012)
- Constructors: Fiat
- Tyre suppliers: Pirelli
- Last Drivers' champion: (Rio de Janeiro (state)) Cacá Bueno
- Last Teams' champion: GT Competições
- Official website: www.racingfestival.com.br

Copa Fiat Brasil previously known as Trofeo Linea Brasil was a one-make racing series by Fiat based in Brazil which uses the Fiat Linea model. The category was founded in 2010 by Felipe Massa and his family and ended in 2012. The series was organized in collaboration with the Confederação Brasileira de Automobilismo (CBA), RM Racing Events and Carlinhos Romagnolli Promoções e Eventos.

== History ==
Large Brazilian drivers competed in the championship; Cacá Bueno, Christian Fittipaldi, Ricardo Maurício, Thiago Camilo, Allam Khodair, Clemente de Faria, Jr., Hoover Orsi, Giuliano Losacco and Marcos Gomes, mingling with drivers victorious in the regional championships. In 2012 the category was renamed to Copa Fiat Brasil.

== Cars ==
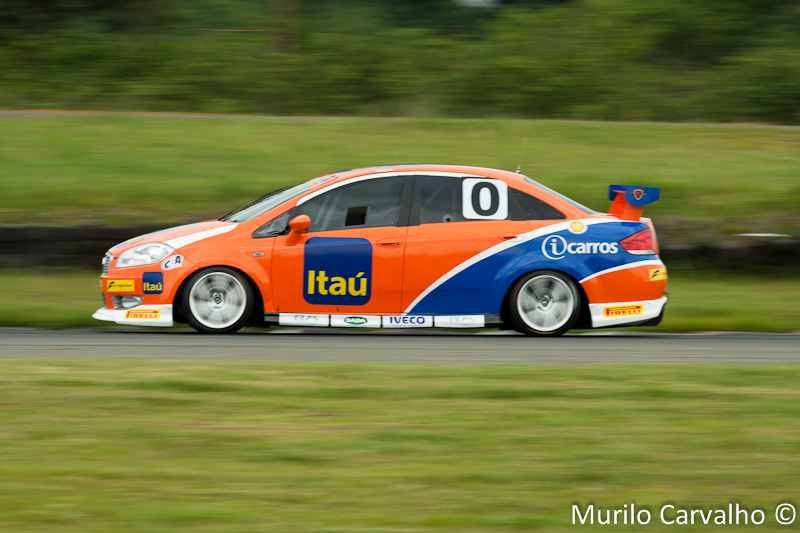
2011 Cacá Bueno.

The car was Fiat Linea prepared for competition. The FPT 1.4 16v turbo – 210cv is the final speed above 200km/h. The transmission has six forward speeds with sequential shift mechanism. Pirelli is the single tyre supplier for the championship.

== Regulation ==
Drivers have a three free patrice session of 30-minute and 1-hour. On Saturday drivers have a qualifying session. The qualifying session decides the grid order for first race.

On second race, the grid is decided by the first result with top 8 being reversed, so the driver who finished 8th on first race will start from pole position and the winner will start from 8th place.

Copa Fiat Brasil points system
	1st	2nd	3rd	4th	5th	6th	7th	8th	9th	10th
Race 1	20	14	12	10	8	6	4	3	2	1
Race 2	15	12	10	8	6	4	2	1		

== Champions ==
Season	Series Name	Champion	Team
2010	Trofeo Linea Brasil	(Rio de Janeiro (state)) Cacá Bueno	GT Competições
2011	Trofeo Linea Brasil	(Rio de Janeiro (state)) Cacá Bueno	GT Competições
2012	Copa Fiat Brasil	(Rio de Janeiro (state)) Cacá Bueno	GT Competições

== Drivers ==
Driver	Best result	Wins
(Rio de Janeiro (state)) Cacá Bueno	1st (2010, 2011, 2012)	13
(Paraná (state)) André Bragantini	2nd (2010, 2012)	6
(Rio de Janeiro (state)) Popó Bueno	2nd (2011)	2
(São Paulo (state)) Christian Fittipaldi	3rd (2012)	3
(São Paulo (state)) Giuliano Losacco	3rd (2011)	3
(Paraná (state)) Cesar Bonilha	4th (2012)	3
(Paraná (state)) Alceu Feldmann	3rd (2010)	0
(São Paulo (state)) Allam Khodair	4th (2011)	1

== Circuits ==
The circuits for the 2011 season are:

- Autódromo José Carlos Pace, São Paulo, SP
- Autódromo Internacional de Curitiba, Pinhais, PR
- Velopark, Nova Santa Rita, RS
- Autódromo Internacional Ayrton Senna, Goiânia, GO
- Autódromo Internacional Ayrton Senna, Londrina, PR
- Autódromo Internacional Nelson Piquet, Brasília, DF

Former circuits in the Trofeo Linea Brasil championship include:

- Autódromo Internacional Nelson Piquet, Rio de Janeiro, RJ (last race: 2010)
- Autódromo Internacional de Santa Cruz do Sul, Santa Cruz do Sul, RS (last race: 2010)
