= 2011 Trofeo Linea Brasil season =

2011 Trofeo Linea Brasil

Seasons
- ← 2010 2012 →

The 2011 Trofeo Linea Brasil season is the second Trofeo Linea Brasil season. It began on 8 May at and Interlagos ended on October 30 at Velopark, after 12 races to be held at six meetings.:

Three race ahead, Cacá Bueno won the title of champion by winning the Trofeo Linea nine round of the season, held at the Curitiba.

Bueno won five races during the season including sweeping the weekend at Londrina, as well as a victory at the first meeting to be held in Interlagos, Brasília and Curitiba. In second place was his brother Popo Bueno, who won at first meeting in Interlagos. Giuliano Lossaco finished in third place, winning two races at the second meeting to be held in Interlagos and Curitiba. Other wins were taken by André Bragantini in second meeting at Interlagos and Velopark, Allam Khodair in Brasília and Cesinha Bonilha won the victory in the last race on Velopark.

== Teams and drivers ==
All cars are powered by FPT engines and use Fiat Linea chassis.

Team	No.	Driver	Rounds
GT Competições	0	(Rio de Janeiro (state)) Cacá Bueno	All
GT Competições	74	(Rio de Janeiro (state)) Popó Bueno	All
Fittipaldi Racing	1	(São Paulo (state)) Christian Fittipaldi	All
Fittipaldi Racing	2	(Mato Grosso do Sul) Hoover Orsi	1–2
W Racing	3	(Federal District (Brazil)) Geraldo Piquet	2
W Racing	38	(São Paulo (state)) Rogério Motta	4–6
W Racing	90	(São Paulo (state)) José Vitte	2, 4
W Racing	91	(Paraná (state)) Marcos Ramos	5
DKL Sports Racing	4	(Paraná (state)) Alessandro Marchini	1, 3, 5
DKL Sports Racing	46	(São Paulo (state)) Luciano Kubrusly	1–2, 4
DKL Sports Racing	53	(São Paulo (state)) Fábio Carreira	2–6
Pater Racing	8	(Minas Gerais) Clemente de Faria, Jr.	1–2
Pater Racing	9	(São Paulo (state)) Giuliano Losacco	All
Pater Racing	80	(São Paulo (state)) Marcos Gomes	3–6
Pater Racing	119	(São Paulo (state)) Victor Guerin	6
W2 Racing	8	(Minas Gerais) Clemente de Faria, Jr.	3–6
W2 Racing	12	(Espírito Santo) Betinho Sartorio	All
W2 Racing	26	(Goiás) Wellington Justino	2
W2 Racing	71	(Rio de Janeiro (state)) Serafin Jr.	1
Full Time	10	(Paraná (state)) Alceu Feldmann	1
Engmakers Racing	10	(Paraná (state)) Alceu Feldmann	2
Engmakers Racing	11	(São Paulo (state)) Jacome Sanzone	4
Engmakers Racing	19	(Santa Catarina (state)) Ricky Rosin	1
Engmakers Racing	20	(São Paulo (state)) Alam Hellmeister	1
Engmakers Racing	81	(São Paulo (state)) Ricardo Sargo	4–5
Greco/Sinal	13	(Paraná (state)) André Bragantini	All
Greco/Sinal	30	(São Paulo (state)) Allam Khodair	All
Cesinha Competições	16	(Rio de Janeiro (state)) Ulisses Silva	All
Cesinha Competições	99	(Paraná (state)) Cesar Bonilha	All
Repecon Racing	17	(Santa Catarina (state)) Leonardo Nienkotter	All
Repecon Racing	18	(Santa Catarina (state)) Fernando Nienkotter	All
Quality Sports	33	(Goiás) Rogério Castro	3–6
VL Racing	33	(Goiás) Rogério Castro	1–2
VL Racing	51	(Goiás) Edson do Valle	1–2

== Race calendar and results ==
Round		Circuit	Date	Pole position	Fastest lap	Winning driver	Winning team
1	R1	(São Paulo (state)) Autódromo José Carlos Pace	May 8	(Rio de Janeiro (state)) Popó Bueno	(Paraná (state)) Alceu Feldmann	(Rio de Janeiro (state)) Popó Bueno	GT Competições
1	R2	(São Paulo (state)) Autódromo José Carlos Pace	May 8		(Rio de Janeiro (state)) Cacá Bueno	(Rio de Janeiro (state)) Cacá Bueno	GT Competições
2	R1	(Federal District (Brazil)) Autódromo Internacional Nelson Piquet	June 12	(São Paulo (state)) Allam Khodair	(Rio de Janeiro (state)) Cacá Bueno	(Rio de Janeiro (state)) Cacá Bueno	GT Competições
2	R2	(Federal District (Brazil)) Autódromo Internacional Nelson Piquet	June 12		(São Paulo (state)) Allam Khodair	(São Paulo (state)) Allam Khodair	Greco/Sinal
3	R1	(Paraná (state)) Autódromo Internacional Ayrton Senna	July 17	(Rio de Janeiro (state)) Cacá Bueno	(Paraná (state)) Cesar Bonilha	(Rio de Janeiro (state)) Cacá Bueno	GT Competições
3	R2	(Paraná (state)) Autódromo Internacional Ayrton Senna	July 17		(Paraná (state)) Cesar Bonilha	(Rio de Janeiro (state)) Cacá Bueno	GT Competições
4	R1	(São Paulo (state)) Autódromo José Carlos Pace	August 14	(Paraná (state)) André Bragantini	(Rio de Janeiro (state)) Cacá Bueno	(Paraná (state)) André Bragantini	Greco/Sinal
4	R2	(São Paulo (state)) Autódromo José Carlos Pace	August 14		(Rio de Janeiro (state)) Cacá Bueno	(São Paulo (state)) Giuliano Losacco	Pater Racing
5	R1	(Paraná (state)) Autódromo Internacional de Curitiba	September 25	(Rio de Janeiro (state)) Cacá Bueno	(Minas Gerais) Clemente de Faria, Jr.	(Rio de Janeiro (state)) Cacá Bueno	GT Competições
5	R2	(Paraná (state)) Autódromo Internacional de Curitiba	September 25		(Rio de Janeiro (state)) Cacá Bueno	(São Paulo (state)) Giuliano Losacco	Pater Racing
6	R1	(Rio Grande do Sul) Velopark, Nova Santa Rita	October 30	(São Paulo (state)) Marcos Gomes	(Paraná (state)) Cesar Bonilha	(Paraná (state)) André Bragantini	Greco/Sinal
6	R2	(Rio Grande do Sul) Velopark, Nova Santa Rita	October 30		(Rio de Janeiro (state)) Cacá Bueno	(Paraná (state)) Cesar Bonilha	Cesinha Competições

== Championship standings ==
- Points were awarded as follows:

Pos	1	2	3	4	5	6	7	8	9	10
Race 1	20	14	12	10	8	6	4	3	2	1
Race 2	15	12	10	8	6	4	2	1	0	

Pos	Driver	INT (São Paulo (state))		BRA (Federal District (Brazil))		LON (Paraná (state))		INT (São Paulo (state))		CUR (Paraná (state))		VEL (Rio Grande do Sul)		Pts
1	(Rio de Janeiro (state)) Cacá Bueno	Ret	1	1	3	**1**	1	9	4	**1**	4	4	10	128
2	(Rio de Janeiro (state)) Popó Bueno	**1**	Ret	4	2	13	Ret	2	8	8	**8**	3	7	75
3	(São Paulo (state)) Giuliano Losacco	3	Ret	6	6	9	Ret	4	1	6	1	8	**DSQ**	73
4	(São Paulo (state)) Allam Khodair	Ret	DNS	**2**	1	3	DSQ	3	6	Ret	DNS	5	5	71
5	(Paraná (state)) André Bragantini	Ret	11	Ret	DNS	7	DSQ	**1**	7	2	13	1	3	70
6	(Santa Catarina (state)) Leonardo Nienkotter	DSQ	3	3	4	5	8	Ret	12	11	3	10	4	58
7	(São Paulo (state)) Christian Fittipaldi	Ret	4	Ret	17	Ret	4	5	5	7	Ret	6	2	52
8	(Paraná (state)) Cesar Bonilha	Ret	DNS	13	Ret	2	11	15	3	5	14	7	1	51
9	(São Paulo (state)) Marcos Gomes					12	3	8	**DNS**	10	2	**2**	6	44
10	(São Paulo (state)) Fábio Carreira			5	7	Ret	5	6	2	4	DNS	Ret	Ret	44
11	(Minas Gerais) Clemente de Faria, Jr.	Ret	8	Ret	13	6	2	7	12	3	6	9	13	41
12	(Paraná (state)) Alceu Feldmann	6	2	9	12									20
13	(Rio de Janeiro (state)) Ulisses Silva	Ret	DNS	12	5	4	Ret	11	Ret	Ret	9	11	11	16
14	(Santa Catarina (state)) Fernando Nienkotter	7	10	16	8	8	**9**	10	Ret	12	5	13	12	15
15	(São Paulo (state)) Alan Hellmeister	2	Ret											14
16	(Mato Grosso do Sul) Hoover Orsi	4	9	7	16									14
17	(Espírito Santo) Betinho Sartorio	5	DSQ	14	15	11	10	Ret	9	16	12	12	Ret	8
18	(Rio de Janeiro (state)) Serafin Jr.	11	5											6
19	(Paraná (state)) Alessandro Marchini	8	**Ret**			10	7			13	10			6
20	(Santa Catarina (state)) Ricky Rosin	10	6											5
21	(São Paulo (state)) Rogério Motta							13	13	9	7	15	8	5
22	(Goiás) Rogério Castro	12	12	Ret	11	DSQ	6	16	14	14	15	16	9	4
23	(São Paulo (state)) Luciano Kubusly	9	7	Ret	Ret			14	11					4
24	(São Paulo (state)) José Vitte			8	**10**			Ret	DNS					3
25	(Goiás) Wellington Justino			10	9									1
	(São Paulo (state)) Ricardo Sargo							12	10	17	Ret			0
	(Paraná (state)) Marcos Ramos									15	11			0
	(Goiás) Edson do Valle	DNS	DNS	11	Ret									0
	(Federal District (Brazil)) Geraldo Piquet			15	14									0
	(São Paulo (state)) Victor Guerin											14	DSQ	0
	(São Paulo (state)) Jacomo Sanzone							17	16					0
Pos	Driver	INT (São Paulo (state))		BRA (Federal District (Brazil))		LON (Paraná (state))		INT (São Paulo (state))		CUR (Paraná (state))		VEL (Rio Grande do Sul)		Pts

Colour	Result
Gold	Winner
Silver	Second place
Bronze	Third place
Green	Points classification
Blue	Non-points classification
Blue	Non-classified finish (NC)
Purple	Retired, not classified (Ret)
Red	Did not qualify (DNQ)
Red	Did not pre-qualify (DNPQ)
Black	Disqualified (DSQ)
White	Did not start (DNS)
White	Withdrew (WD)
White	Race cancelled (C)
Blank	Did not practice (DNP)
Blank	Did not arrive (DNA)
Blank	Excluded (EX)

**Bold** – Pole
Italics – Fastest Lap
