= 2012 Copa Fiat Brasil season =

2012 Copa Fiat Brasil

Seasons
- ← 2011 none →

The 2012 Copa Fiat Brasil season was the third Copa Fiat Brasil season. It began on 3 June at Londrina and ended on November 4 at Velopark, after 12 races to be held at six meetings. In 2012 the category was renamed to Copa Fiat Brasil.

Cacá Bueno won the championship for the third time, after beat Andre Bragantini for six points.

== Teams and drivers ==
All cars are powered by FPT engines and use Fiat Linea chassis.

Team	No.	Driver	Rounds
GT Competições	0	(Rio de Janeiro (state)) Cacá Bueno	All
GT Competições	74	(Rio de Janeiro (state)) Popó Bueno	All
Fittipaldi Racing	1	(São Paulo (state)) Christian Fittipaldi	All
Fittipaldi Racing	2	(São Paulo (state)) Mauri Zacarelli	All
GF Sports	3	(Rio de Janeiro (state)) João Scalabrin	2
GF Sports	4	(Paraná (state)) Júlio Campos	2
W2 Racing	8	(Minas Gerais) Clemente de Faria, Jr.	1–2, 4–6
W2 Racing	42	(Rio de Janeiro (state)) Luir Miranda	All
W2 Racing	71	(Rio de Janeiro (state)) Serafin Jr.	3
Pater Racing	9	(São Paulo (state)) Giuliano Losacco	All
Pater Racing	13	(Paraná (state)) André Bragantini	All
Pater Racing	21	(São Paulo (state)) Thiago Camilo	5–6
Pater Racing	80	(São Paulo (state)) Marcos Gomes	1
Pater Racing	91	(São Paulo (state)) Victor Guerin	4
FC Brasil	11	(São Paulo (state)) Rogerio Motta	5–6
W Racing	12	(Espírito Santo) Betinho Sartorio	2–4
W Racing	90	(São Paulo (state)) José Vitte	1–4
Greco	15	(São Paulo (state)) Antonio Jorge Neto	2–3
Greco	21	(São Paulo (state)) Fábio Carvalho	2–3
Greco	30	(São Paulo (state)) Allam Khodair	1
Greco	53	(São Paulo (state)) Fábio Carreira	1
Vasco Racing Team	16	(Rio de Janeiro (state)) Ulisses Silva	All
Vasco Racing Team	99	(Paraná (state)) Cesar Bonilha	All
Repecon Racing	17	(Santa Catarina (state)) Leonardo Nienkotter	All
Repecon Racing	18	(Santa Catarina (state)) Fernando Nienkotter	All
MG Sports	26	(Goiás) Wellington Justino	All
MG Sports	46	(Goiás) Edson do Valle	1–3
Quality Sports	33	(Goiás) Rogério Castro	1–4, 6
Quality Sports	83	(Federal District (Brazil)) Renato Constantino	5
Cesinha Competições	88	(Paraná (state)) Carlos Eduardo	4–6

== Race calendar and results ==
Round		Circuit	Date	Pole position	Fastest lap	Winning driver	Winning team
1	R1	(Paraná (state)) Autódromo Internacional Ayrton Senna	June 3	(Rio de Janeiro (state)) Cacá Bueno	(Rio de Janeiro (state)) Cacá Bueno	(Rio de Janeiro (state)) Cacá Bueno	GT Competições
1	R2	(Paraná (state)) Autódromo Internacional Ayrton Senna	June 3		Race transferred^{1}		
2	R1	(Goiás) Autódromo Internacional Ayrton Senna	July 8	(São Paulo (state)) Christian Fittipaldi	(São Paulo (state)) Christian Fittipaldi	(São Paulo (state)) Christian Fittipaldi	Fittipaldi Racing
2	R2	(Goiás) Autódromo Internacional Ayrton Senna	July 8		(São Paulo (state)) Christian Fittipaldi	(São Paulo (state)) Christian Fittipaldi	Fittipaldi Racing
3	R1	(Paraná (state)) Autódromo Internacional de Curitiba	July 28		(Paraná (state)) André Bragantini	(Rio de Janeiro (state)) Cacá Bueno	GT Competições
3	R2	(Paraná (state)) Autódromo Internacional de Curitiba	July 29	(Rio de Janeiro (state)) Cacá Bueno	(Rio de Janeiro (state)) Cacá Bueno	(Rio de Janeiro (state)) Cacá Bueno	GT Competições
3	R3	(Paraná (state)) Autódromo Internacional de Curitiba	July 29		(Paraná (state)) André Bragantini	(Paraná (state)) André Bragantini	Pater Racing
4	R1	(São Paulo (state)) Autódromo José Carlos Pace	August 19	(Paraná (state)) André Bragantini	(Paraná (state)) André Bragantini	(Paraná (state)) André Bragantini	Pater Racing
4	R2	(São Paulo (state)) Autódromo José Carlos Pace	August 19		(Rio de Janeiro (state)) Cacá Bueno	(Rio de Janeiro (state)) Cacá Bueno	GT Competições
5	R1	(Federal District (Brazil)) Autódromo Internacional Nelson Piquet	October 7	(Rio de Janeiro (state)) Cacá Bueno	(Rio de Janeiro (state)) Cacá Bueno	(Rio de Janeiro (state)) Cacá Bueno	GT Competições
5	R2	(Federal District (Brazil)) Autódromo Internacional Nelson Piquet	October 7		(Paraná (state)) André Bragantini	(Paraná (state)) André Bragantini	Pater Racing
6	R1	(Rio Grande do Sul) Velopark, Nova Santa Rita	November 4	(São Paulo (state)) Thiago Camilo	(São Paulo (state)) Thiago Camilo	(São Paulo (state)) Thiago Camilo	Pater Racing
6	R2	(Rio Grande do Sul) Velopark, Nova Santa Rita	November 4		(Rio de Janeiro (state)) Popó Bueno	(Paraná (state)) Cesar Bonilha	Vasco Racing Team

Notes:

- ^1 — The second race at Londrina was transferred to July 28 at Curitiba, but only the drivers who competed at Londrina will can run.

== Championship standings ==
- Points were awarded as follows:

Pos	1	2	3	4	5	6	7	8	9	10
Race 1	20	14	12	10	8	6	4	3	2	1
Race 2	15	12	10	8	6	4	2	1	0	

Pos	Driver	LON (Paraná (state))	GOI (Goiás)		CUR^{1} (Paraná (state))	CUR (Paraná (state))		INT (São Paulo (state))		BRA (Federal District (Brazil))		VEL (Rio Grande do Sul)		Pts
1	(Rio de Janeiro (state)) Cacá Bueno	**1**	2	9	1	**1**	Ret	3	1	**1**	2	2	DNS	142
2	(Paraná (state)) André Bragantini	2	4	Ret	2	3	1	**1**	2	2	1	8	**2**	136
3	(São Paulo (state)) Christian Fittipaldi	3	**1**	1	3	2	Ret	Ret	8	7	DSQ	6	Ret	82
4	(Paraná (state)) Cesar Bonilha	9	Ret	7	6	6	3	2	7	8	**7**	4	1	68
5	(São Paulo (state)) Giuliano Losacco	4	5	3	Ret	Ret	4	4	3	6	6	Ret	Ret	66
6	(Rio de Janeiro (state)) Popó Bueno	Ret	6	2	7	7	12	Ret	5	5	Ret	5	3	56
7	(Minas Gerais) Clemente de Faria, Jr.	Ret	Ret	Ret				6	Ret	3	3	3	4	48
8	(Rio de Janeiro (state)) Ulisses Silva	8	Ret	4	**DSQ**	5	2	12	6	10	8	9	6	43
9	(São Paulo (state)) Thiago Camilo									4	4	**1**	DNS	38
10	(Goiás) Wellington Justino	5	7	12	4	Ret	6	5	11	9	Ret	11	Ret	34
11	(Rio de Janeiro (state)) Luir Miranda	Ret	Ret	5	Ret	Ret	5	9	9	15	5	7	5	30
12	(Santa Catarina (state)) Leonardo Nienkotter	Ret	Ret	Ret	5	4	13	7	4	Ret	9	10	Ret	29
13	(Goiás) Edson do Valle	10	3	Ret	Ret	8	**DSQ**							16
14	(Santa Catarina (state)) Fernando Nienkotter	DNS	14	8	Ret	12	7	8	**Ret**	12	Ret	13	7	8
15	(São Paulo (state)) Allam Khodair	6												6
16	(São Paulo (state)) Mauri Zacarelli	7	Ret	DNS	9	10	11	13	DNS	11	Ret	12	DSQ	5
17	(Espírito Santo) Betinho Sartorio		10	10		9	9	11	12					4
18	(Goiás) Rogério Castro	Ret	12	6	DNS	DSQ	Ret	14	13			Ret	DNS	4
19	(São Paulo (state)) José Vitte	Ret	9	Ret	8	Ret	10	15	10					3
20	(São Paulo (state)) Antonio Jorge Neto		8	**13**		Ret	Ret							3
21	(Paraná (state)) Carlos Eduardo							10	Ret	13	10	14	8	2
	(São Paulo (state)) Fábio Carvalho		13	11		11	9							0
	(São Paulo (state)) Rogerio Motta									16	11	15	Ret	0
	(Rio de Janeiro (state)) João Scalabrin		11	DNS										0
	(Rio de Janeiro (state)) Serafin Jr.					Ret	14							0
	(Federal District (Brazil)) Renato Constantino									14	Ret			0
	(São Paulo (state)) Victor Guerin							16	Ret					0
	(Paraná (state)) Júlio Campos		Ret	Ret										0
	(São Paulo (state)) Marcos Gomes	Ret												0
	(São Paulo (state)) Fábio Carreira	Ret												0
Pos	Driver	LON (Paraná (state))	GOI (Goiás)		CUR^{1} (Paraná (state))	CUR (Paraná (state))		INT (São Paulo (state))		BRA (Federal District (Brazil))		VEL (Rio Grande do Sul)		Pts

Colour	Result
Gold	Winner
Silver	Second place
Bronze	Third place
Green	Points classification
Blue	Non-points classification
Blue	Non-classified finish (NC)
Purple	Retired, not classified (Ret)
Red	Did not qualify (DNQ)
Red	Did not pre-qualify (DNPQ)
Black	Disqualified (DSQ)
White	Did not start (DNS)
White	Withdrew (WD)
White	Race cancelled (C)
Blank	Did not practice (DNP)
Blank	Did not arrive (DNA)
Blank	Excluded (EX)

**Bold** – Pole
Italics – Fastest Lap

Notes:

- **^1** - Allam Khodair, Clemente de Faria, Jr., Fábio Carreira and Marcos Gomes will compete at Londrina, but not participate in Curitiba round.
