= 2014 Stock Car Brasil season =

Car racing competition

The 2014 Circuito Nova Schin Stock Car Brasil season was the thirty-sixth season of the Stock Car Pro Series.

== Teams and drivers ==
Season entries
Manufacturer	Team	No.	Driver	Rounds
Chevrolet Sonic	Red Bull Racing	0	(Brazil) Cacá Bueno	All
Chevrolet Sonic	Red Bull Racing	29	(Brazil) Daniel Serra	All
Chevrolet Sonic	Bardahl Hot Car	2	(Brazil) Raphael Matos	All
Chevrolet Sonic	Bardahl Hot Car	110	(Brazil) Felipe Lapenna	All
Chevrolet Sonic	ProGP	8	(Brazil) Rafael Suzuki	All
Chevrolet Sonic	ProGP	100	(Brazil) Bia Figueiredo	All
Chevrolet Sonic	RZ Motorsport	10	(Brazil) Ricardo Zonta	All
Chevrolet Sonic	RZ Motorsport	25	(Brazil) Tuka Rocha	All
Chevrolet Sonic	Mobil Super Pioneer Racing	11	(Brazil) Nonô Figueiredo	All
Chevrolet Sonic	Mobil Super Pioneer Racing	51	(Brazil) Átila Abreu	All
Chevrolet Sonic	Vogel Motorsport	14	(Brazil) Luciano Burti	All
Chevrolet Sonic	Vogel Motorsport	88	(Brazil) Felipe Fraga	All
Chevrolet Sonic	Full Time Sports	18	(Brazil) Allam Khodair	All
Chevrolet Sonic	Full Time Sports	111	(Brazil) Rubens Barrichello	All
Chevrolet Sonic	Ipiranga-RCM	21	(Brazil) Thiago Camilo	All
Chevrolet Sonic	Ipiranga-RCM	28	(Brazil) Galid Osman	All
Chevrolet Sonic	Eurofarma RC	65	(Brazil) Max Wilson	All
Chevrolet Sonic	Eurofarma RC	90	(Brazil) Ricardo Maurício	All
Chevrolet Sonic	C2 Team	70	(Brazil) Diego Nunes	All
Chevrolet Sonic	C2 Team	83	(Brazil) Gabriel Casagrande	All
Chevrolet Sonic	Shell Racing	74	(Brazil) Popó Bueno	All
Chevrolet Sonic	Shell Racing	77	(Brazil) Valdeno Brito	All
Peugeot 408	Prati-Donaduzzi	1	(Brazil) Antônio Pizzonia	All
Peugeot 408	Prati-Donaduzzi	4	(Brazil) Júlio Campos	All
Peugeot 408	Voxx Racing	5	(Brazil) Denis Navarro	All
Peugeot 408	Voxx Racing	73	(Brazil) Sérgio Jimenez	All
Peugeot 408	Hanier Racing	7	(Brazil) Beto Cavaleiro	1–6, 8–12
Peugeot 408	Hanier Racing	63	(Brazil) Lico Kaesemodel	7
Peugeot 408	Hanier Racing	82	(Brazil) Alceu Feldmann	All
Peugeot 408	RC3 Bassani	12	(Brazil) Lucas Foresti	All
Peugeot 408	RC3 Bassani	22	(Brazil) Mauri Zacarelli	6
Peugeot 408	RC3 Bassani	26	(Brazil) Wellington Justino	7
Peugeot 408	RC3 Bassani	97	(Brazil) Felipe Gama	10
Peugeot 408	Boettger Competições	26	(Brazil) Wellington Justino	5
Peugeot 408	Boettger Competições	43	(Brazil) Vicente Orige	8
Peugeot 408	Boettger Competições	46	(Brazil) Vitor Genz	All
Peugeot 408	Boettger Competições	57	(Brazil) Felipe Tozzo	1–2, 4, 6–7, 9–10, 12
Peugeot 408	Boettger Competições	63	(Brazil) Lico Kaesemodel	3
Peugeot 408	Schin Racing Team	72	(Brazil) Fabio Fogaça	All
Peugeot 408	Schin Racing Team	80	(Brazil) Marcos Gomes	All

First round entries
Team	No	Season driver	Wildcard driver
Red Bull Racing	0	(Brazil) Cacá Bueno	(Argentina) Juan Manuel Silva
Red Bull Racing	29	(Brazil) Daniel Serra	(Italy) Alessandro Pier Guidi
Prati-Donaduzzi	1	(Brazil) Antônio Pizzonia	(Brazil) Bruno Senna
Prati-Donaduzzi	4	(Brazil) Júlio Campos	(Brazil) Fábio Carbone
Hot Car Competições	2	(Brazil) Raphael Matos	(Brazil) Felipe Maluhy
Hot Car Competições	110	(Brazil) Felipe Lapenna	(Brazil) Chico Serra
Voxx Racing	5	(Brazil) Denis Navarro	(Portugal) Álvaro Parente
Voxx Racing	73	(Brazil) Sérgio Jimenez	(Australia) Mark Winterbottom
Hanier Racing	7	(Brazil) Beto Cavaleiro	(Brazil) Fábio Carreira
Hanier Racing	82	(Brazil) Alceu Feldmann	(Spain) Roberto Merhi
ProGP	8	(Brazil) Rafael Suzuki	(Brazil) Giuliano Losacco
ProGP	100	(Brazil) Bia Figueiredo	(Brazil) Duda Pamplona
RZ Motorsport	10	(Brazil) Ricardo Zonta	(Argentina) Diego Aventín
RZ Motorsport	25	(Brazil) Tuka Rocha	(United Kingdom) Craig Dolby
Mobil Super Racing	11	(Brazil) Nonô Figueiredo	(Spain) Miguel Molina
Mobil Super Racing	51	(Brazil) Átila Abreu	(Brazil) Nelson Piquet Jr.
RC3 Bassani	12	(Brazil) Lucas Foresti	(Brazil) Antonio Jorge Neto
Vogel Motorsport	14	(Brazil) Luciano Burti	(Brazil) Ricardo Rosset
Vogel Motorsport	88	(Brazil) Felipe Fraga	(Brazil) Rodrigo Sperafico
Full Time Sports	18	(Brazil) Allam Khodair	(Brazil) Bruno Junqueira
Full Time Sports	111	(Brazil) Rubens Barrichello	(Brazil) Augusto Farfus
Ipiranga-RCM	21	(Brazil) Thiago Camilo	(Brazil) Lucas di Grassi
Ipiranga-RCM	28	(Brazil) Galid Osman	(Brazil) César Ramos
Boettger Competições	46	(Brazil) Vitor Genz	(Brazil) Vítor Meira
Boettger Competições	57	(Brazil) Felipe Tozzo	(Brazil) Cláudio Ricci
Eurofarma RC	65	(Brazil) Max Wilson	(Australia) Dean Canto
Eurofarma RC	90	(Brazil) Ricardo Maurício	(Brazil) Oswaldo Negri
Axalta C2 Team	70	(Brazil) Diego Nunes	(Brazil) Jaime Melo
Axalta C2 Team	83	(Brazil) Gabriel Casagrande	(Brazil) Enrique Bernoldi
Schin Racing Team	72	(Brazil) Fabio Fogaça	(Brazil) David Muffato
Schin Racing Team	80	(Brazil) Marcos Gomes	(Argentina) Mauro Giallombardo
Shell Racing	74	(Brazil) Popó Bueno	(Argentina) Gabriel Ponce de León
Shell Racing	77	(Brazil) Valdeno Brito	(Netherlands) Jeroen Bleekemolen

=== Team changes ===
- Stock Car Brasil driver Júlio Campos and businessman Edson Casagrande purchased the vacancies of Gramacho team and created a new team called the C2 Team. The team also switched manufacturers from Peugeot to Chevrolet.
- Shell Racing return to Chevrolet after two seasons with Peugeot.
- After ten season of partnership, Officer group and ProGP break up. Duda Pamplona owner of ProGP still in the series and Officer group left the championship.
- Ricardo Zonta's team RZ Motorsport lost the BMC Group as its principal sponsor and returned to its official name in 2014.

=== Driver changes ===
- Gabriel Casagrande and Diego Nunes joined the new C2 Team from RC3 Bassani, replacing 2013 Gramacho driver Rodrigo Pimenta.
- Alceu Feldmann switched from Full Time Sports to Hanier Racing.
- Bia Figueiredo and Rafael Suzuki joined ProGP, replacing Duda Pamplona and Ricardo Sperafico. Figueiredo had previously raced in the IndyCar Series and Suzuki in the International GT Open series
- Felipe Fraga and Luciano Burti joined Vogel Motosport. Fraga was champion in the second tier Campeonato Brasileiro de Turismo series in 2013 and Burti left Boettger Competições.
- Fábio Fogaça left Vogel Motorsport to race for the Schin Racing Team, replacing David Muffato.
- Vitor Genz and Felipe Tozzo joined Boettger Competições; Genz joined from Gramacho Competições and Tozzo will make his debut in the series. The drivers replaced Lico Kaesemodel at the team.
- Allam Khodair left Vogel Motorsport team to return to Full Time Sports; he had competed with the team in 2009 and 2010 already.
- Felipe Lapenna left the Hanier Racing team to join Hot Car Competições, replacing Wellington Justino.
- David Muffato, Duda Pamplona and Rodrigo Sperafico had been due to leave the series for 2014, but were later confirmed for the first round.
- Antônio Pizzonia returned to the series with Prati-Donaduzzi, replacing Rodrigo Sperafico.

==== Mid-season changes ====
- Lico Kaesemodel returned for the second round with Boettger Competições, replacing Felipe Tozzo for selected races. At the fifth round Wellington Justino replaced Tozzo.
- Kaesemodel replaced Beto Cavaleiro at the Hanier Racing team for the Curitiba round.
- Stock Car Brasil second tier driver Mauri Zacarelli entered the series in the second RC3 Bassani Peugeot at Cascavel. After one round with Boettger Competições, Justino made his return at Bassani for the Curitiba round. Honda Brasileiro de Marcas driver Vicente Orige made his début with Bassani at Velopark. In Taruma Felipe Gama return to Stock with Bassani after eight seasons.

== Race calendar and results ==
The provisional 2014 schedule was announced on 6 December 2013 with the track of sixth edition of Stock Car Corrida do Milhão held on August 8 to be announced; the season was contested over twenty-one races at twelve rounds, with the first round at Interlagos being contested by two-driver entries with wildcard drivers. The 2014 official calendar was announced on 20 March, without the Ribeirão Preto Street Circuit on the calendar. It was later confirmed that the renovated Autódromo Internacional Ayrton Senna in Goiânia would host the sixth edition of the Stock Car Corrida do Milhão. A revised calendar was announced on May 7 with the return of Ribeirão Preto and Curitiba to hold the final round. In August Ribeirão Preto was again removed from the calendar, with another Santa Cruz round added in its place. All races were held in Brazil.

Round	Circuit	Date	Pole position	Fastest lap	Winning driver	Winning team
1	Interlagos Circuit	March 23	(Brazil) Cacá Bueno (Argentina) Juan Manuel Silva	(Brazil) Rubens Barrichello (Brazil) Augusto Farfus	(Brazil) Felipe Fraga (Brazil) Rodrigo Sperafico	Vogel Motorsport
2	Autódromo Internacional de Santa Cruz do Sul	April 13	(Brazil) Cacá Bueno	(Brazil) Daniel Serra	(Brazil) Valdeno Brito	Shell Racing
3	Autódromo Internacional de Santa Cruz do Sul	April 13		(Brazil) Felipe Fraga	(Brazil) Antônio Pizzonia	Prati-Donaduzzi
4	Autódromo Internacional Nelson Piquet, Brasília	April 27	(Brazil) Felipe Fraga	(Brazil) Felipe Fraga	(Brazil) Átila Abreu	Mobil Super Racing
5	Autódromo Internacional Nelson Piquet, Brasília	April 27		(Brazil) Ricardo Mauricio	(Brazil) Thiago Camilo	Ipiranga-RCM
6	Autódromo Internacional Ayrton Senna, Goiânia	June 1	(Brazil) Átila Abreu	(Brazil) Raphael Matos	(Brazil) Felipe Fraga	Vogel Motorsport
7	Autódromo Internacional Ayrton Senna, Goiânia	June 1		(Brazil) Cacá Bueno	(Brazil) Thiago Camilo	Ipiranga-RCM
8	Autódromo Internacional Ayrton Senna, Goiânia	August 3	(Brazil) Rubens Barrichello	(Brazil) Thiago Camilo	(Brazil) Rubens Barrichello	Full Time Sports
9	Autodromo Internacional de Cascavel	August 17	(Brazil) Júlio Campos	(Brazil) Júlio Campos	(Brazil) Rubens Barrichello	Full Time Sports
10	Autodromo Internacional de Cascavel	August 17		(Brazil) Max Wilson	(Brazil) Marcos Gomes	Schin Racing Team
11	Autodromo Internacional de Curitiba	August 31	(Brazil) Daniel Serra	(Brazil) Daniel Serra	(Brazil) Daniel Serra	Red Bull Racing
12	Autodromo Internacional de Curitiba	August 31		(Brazil) Thiago Camilo	(Brazil) Ricardo Mauricio	Eurofarma RC
13	Velopark, Nova Santa Rita	September 14	(Brazil) Júlio Campos	(Brazil) Júlio Campos	(Brazil) Galid Osman	Ipiranga-RCM
14	Velopark, Nova Santa Rita	September 14		(Brazil) Max Wilson	(Brazil) Ricardo Mauricio	Eurofarma RC
15	Autódromo Internacional de Santa Cruz do Sul	September 28	(Brazil) Thiago Camilo	(Brazil) Thiago Camilo	(Brazil) Thiago Camilo	Ipiranga-RCM
16	Autódromo Internacional de Santa Cruz do Sul	September 28		(Brazil) Nonô Figueiredo	(Brazil) Raphael Matos	Hot Car Competições
17	Autódromo Internacional de Tarumã	November 2	(Brazil) Ricardo Mauricio	(Brazil) Antônio Pizzonia	(Brazil) Júlio Campos	Prati-Donaduzzi
18	Autódromo Internacional de Tarumã	November 2		(Brazil) Marcos Gomes	(Brazil) Antônio Pizzonia	Prati-Donaduzzi
19	Circuito Ayrton Senna, Salvador	November 15	(Brazil) Allam Khodair	(Brazil) Felipe Fraga	(Brazil) Allam Khodair	Full Time Sports
20	Circuito Ayrton Senna, Salvador	November 15		(Brazil) Luciano Burti	(Brazil) Sérgio Jimenez	Voxx Racing
21	Autodromo Internacional de Curitiba	November 30	(Brazil) Rubens Barrichello	(Brazil) Rubens Barrichello	(Brazil) Daniel Serra	Red Bull Racing

== Championship standings ==
Points system

Points were awarded for each race at an event, to the driver/s of a car that completed at least 75% of the race distance and was running at the completion of the race, up to a maximum of 48 points per event.

Points format	Position																			
Points format	1st	2nd	3rd	4th	5th	6th	7th	8th	9th	10th	11th	12th	13th	14th	15th	16th	17th	18th	19th	20th
Dual race	12	11	10	9	8	7	6	5	4	3	2	1	0	0	0	0	0	0	0	0
Feature races	24	20	18	17	16	15	14	13	12	11	10	9	8	7	6	5	4	3	2	1
Sprint races	15	13	12	11	10	9	8	7	6	5	4	3	2	1	0	0	0	0	0	0
Final race	48	40	36	34	32	30	28	26	24	22	20	18	16	14	12	10	8	6	4	2

- Dual Race: Used for the first round with Wildcard drivers.
- Feature races: Used for the first race of each event and the Stock Car Million race.
- Sprint races: Used for the second race of each event, with partially reversed (top ten) grid.
- Final race: Used for the last round of the season with double points.

=== Drivers' Championship ===
Pos	Driver	INT	SCZ1		BRA		GOI1		GOI2	CAS		CUR1 (Note: Half points were awarded for the first race as less than 75% of the race distance had been completed.)		VEL		SCZ2		TAR		SAL		CUR2	Pts
1	(Brazil) Rubens Barrichello	9	16	DNS	24	4	9	2	**1**	1	18	7	2	4	6	19	11	9	2	4	4	**3**	234
2	(Brazil) Átila Abreu	6	26	7	1	20	**2**	22	4	3	5	4	8	8	2	22	20	19	7	3	5	2	223.5
3	(Brazil) Cacá Bueno	**7**	**2**	10	20	3	Ret	8	8	4	Ret	5	4	2	8	15	14	14	4	Ret	10	4	191
4	(Brazil) Allam Khodair	Ret	10	**20**	14	17	6	17	7	12	Ret	3	20	7	3	3	21	2	19	**1**	21	5	185
5	(Brazil) Daniel Serra	5	19	2	16	5	Ret	DNS	25	Ret	12	**1**	6	3	7	2	8	17	Ret	12	9	1	182
6	(Brazil) Thiago Camilo	Ret	21	Ret	10	**1**	10	**1**	2	16	9	14	7	9	DSQ	**1**	9	5	6	8	18	Ret	174.5
7	(Brazil) Sérgio Jimenez	4	5	3	9	15	Ret	6	11	7	4	9	5	11	13	Ret	13	13	24	9	1	13	174
8	(Brazil) Júlio Campos	11	14	Ret	6	2	15	3	5	**2**	26	6	22	**Ret**	20	8	2	1	12	13	7	23	167.5
9	(Brazil) Antônio Pizzonia	21	11	1	Ret	DNS	12	7	6	11	7	12	21	13	10	7	4	10	**1**	6	22	22	158.5
10	(Brazil) Max Wilson	Ret	Ret	11	4	22	Ret	10	12	10	3	11	9	6	4	9	3	7	11	18	11	20	146
11	(Brazil) Valdeno Brito	2	1	13	7	14	Ret	5	27	8	2	2	25	25	DNS	17	22	4	9	Ret	DNS	18	131
12	(Brazil) Ricardo Mauricio	14	4	16	17	25	3	16	9	Ret	11	10	**1**	10	**1**	13	12	**3**	20	Ret	16	14	144.5
13	(Brazil) Marcos Gomes	3	6	4	11	11	7	Ret	26	9	1	Ret	15	26	DNS	4	7	22	5	Ret	DNS	Ret	126
14	(Brazil) Ricardo Zonta	24	17	5	5	24	Ret	Ret	17	14	22	31	DNS	5	5	23	16	6	3	7	Ret	Ret	108
15	(Brazil) Felipe Fraga	1	28	14	**15**	9	1	19	15	26	29	15	16	Ret	24	5	5	32	DNS	2	Ret	Ret	104
16	(Brazil) Raphael Matos	17	7	23	2	26	17	Ret	DSQ	Ret	27	22	12	Ret	Ret	10	**1**	15	8	10	**2**	Ret	104
17	(Brazil) Galid Osman	12	3	Ret	Ret	DNS	21	Ret	3	DSQ	19	8	3	1	12	24	Ret	23	13	16	15	15	101.5
18	(Brazil) Felipe Lapenna	18	9	25	18	13	19	15	21	17	8	21	23	12	9	6	6	25	22	Ret	DNS	7	97
19	(Brazil) Luciano Burti	16	Ret	DNS	3	18	8	4	29	22	13	26	17	Ret	Ret	Ret	DNS	8	Ret	5	3	DSQ	85
20	(Brazil) Diego Nunes	Ret	18	15	Ret	8	4	18	13	Ret	DNS	13	11	15	14	16	Ret	20	Ret	17	12	12	81
21	(Brazil) Popó Bueno	10	12	Ret	13	6	Ret	DNS	22	13	6	17	19	20	19	25	Ret	18	17	Ret	17	11	72
22	(Brazil) Nonô Figueiredo	13	Ret	DNS	12	21	Ret	DNS	10	Ret	17	18	14	Ret	28	26	18	21	10	14	6	6	71.5
23	(Brazil) Gabriel Casagrande	19	Ret	8	Ret	DNS	22	24	18	5	Ret	19	10	16	17	14	Ret	11	DNS	11	8	Ret	71
24	(Brazil) Tuka Rocha	8	13	6	22	7	Ret	DNS	19	20	10	25	24	Ret	26	Ret	DNS	Ret	Ret	15	Ret	10	65
25	(Brazil) Denis Navarro	Ret	8	21	8	19	5	20	16	19	24	23	26	14	11	Ret	DNS	Ret	21	Ret	DNS	19	64
26	(Brazil) Vitor Genz	Ret	15	24	Ret	DNS	13	9	Ret	6	28	24	18	17	16	DSQ	DSQ	12	16	20	23	Ret	49
27	(Brazil) Rafael Suzuki	25	20	17	23	Ret	Ret	DNS	Ret	15	20	20	27	19	18	18	15	16	18	19	13	8	47.5
28	(Brazil) Lucas Foresti	20	25	12	27	10	14	14	14	Ret	21	16	13	21	22	11	10	29	25	Ret	DNS	Ret	42.5
29	(Brazil) Alceu Feldmann	Ret	23	9	19	12	16	11	24	21	14	Ret	DNS	23	21	12	Ret	26	23	Ret	20	17	38
30	(Brazil) Fábio Fogaça	23	Ret	DNS	25	Ret	20	13	28	18	15	27	Ret	Ret	23	Ret	DNS	24	Ret	23	14	9	31
31	(Brazil) Felipe Tozzo	22	24	22			18	12		24	16	32	Ret			20	Ret	30	Ret			15	19
32	(Brazil) Bia Figueiredo	15	22	18	21	16	11	23	20	Ret	DNS	30	DNS	18	15	21	17	27	14	21	19	Ret	15
	(Brazil) Beto Cavaleiro	Ret	27	19	26	23	Ret	21	DSQ	25	23			24	27	Ret	19	31	15	31	24	21	0
	(Brazil) Vicente Orige													22	25								0
	(Brazil) Mauri Zaccarelli									23	25												0
	(Brazil) Wellington Justino								23			29	DNS										0
	(Brazil) Felipe Gama																	28	26				0
	(Brazil) Lico Kaesemodel				Ret	DNS						28	DNS										0
Guest drivers ineligible to score points
	(Brazil) Rodrigo Sperafico	1																					0
	(Netherlands) Jeroen Bleekemolen	2																					0
	(Argentina) Mauro Giallombardo	3																					0
	(Australia) Mark Winterbottom	4																					0
	(Italy) Alessandro Pier Guidi	5																					0
	(Brazil) Nelson Piquet Jr.	6																					0
	(Argentina) Juan Manuel Silva	**7**																					0
	(United Kingdom) Craig Dolby	8																					0
	(Brazil) Augusto Farfus	9																					0
	(Argentina) Gabriel Ponce de León	10																					0
	(Brazil) Fábio Carbone	11																					0
	(Brazil) César Ramos	12																					0
	(Spain) Miguel Molina	13																					0
	(Brazil) Oswaldo Negri Jr.	14																					0
	(Brazil) Duda Pamplona	15																					0
	(Brazil) Ricardo Rosset	16																					0
	(Brazil) Felipe Maluhy	17																					0
	(Brazil) Chico Serra	18																					0
	(Brazil) Enrique Bernoldi	19																					0
	(Brazil) Antonio Jorge Neto	20																					0
	(Brazil) Bruno Senna	21																					0
	(Brazil) Claudio Ricci	22																					0
	(Brazil) David Muffato	23																					0
	(Argentina) Diego Aventín	24																					0
	(Brazil) Giuliano Losacco	25																					0
	(Brazil) Jaime Melo	Ret																					0
	(Brazil) Fábio Carreira	Ret																					0
	(Brazil) Vítor Meira	Ret																					0
	(Portugal) Álvaro Parente	Ret																					0
	(Australia) Dean Canto	Ret																					0
	(Brazil) Bruno Junqueira	Ret																					0
	(Spain) Roberto Merhi	Ret																					0
	(Brazil) Lucas di Grassi	Ret																					0
Pos	Driver	INT	SCZ1		BRA		GOI1		GOI2	CAS		CUR1		VEL		SCZ2		TAR		SAL		CUR2	Pts

Colour	Result
Gold	Winner
Silver	Second place
Bronze	Third place
Green	Points classification
Blue	Non-points classification
Blue	Non-classified finish (NC)
Purple	Retired, not classified (Ret)
Red	Did not qualify (DNQ)
Red	Did not pre-qualify (DNPQ)
Black	Disqualified (DSQ)
White	Did not start (DNS)
White	Withdrew (WD)
White	Race cancelled (C)
Blank	Did not practice (DNP)
Blank	Did not arrive (DNA)
Blank	Excluded (EX)

**Bold** - Pole position
Italics - Fastest lap

=== Teams' Championship ===
Pos	Team	No.	INT	SCZ1		BRA		GOI1		GOI2	CAS		CUR1		VEL		SCZ2		TAR		SAL		CUR2	Pts
1	Full Time Sports	18	Ret	10	**20**	14	17	6	17	7	12	Ret	3	20	7	3	3	21	2	19	**1**	21	5	419
1	Full Time Sports	111	9	16	DNS	24	4	9	2	**1**	1	18	7	2	4	6	19	11	9	2	4	4	**3**	419
2	Red Bull Racing	0	**7**	**2**	10	20	3	Ret	8	8	4	Ret	5	4	2	8	15	14	14	4	Ret	10	4	373
2	Red Bull Racing	29	5	19	2	16	5	Ret	DNS	25	Ret	12	**1**	6	3	7	2	8	17	Ret	12	9	1	373
3	Prati-Donaduzzi	1	21	11	1	Ret	DNS	12	7	6	11	7	12	21	13	10	7	4	10	**1**	6	22	22	326
3	Prati-Donaduzzi	4	11	14	Ret	6	2	15	3	5	**2**	26	6	22	**Ret**	20	8	2	1	12	13	7	23	326
4	Mobil Super Racing	11	13	Ret	DNS	12	21	Ret	DNS	10	Ret	17	18	14	Ret	28	26	18	21	10	14	6	6	297
4	Mobil Super Racing	51	6	26	7	1	20	**2**	22	4	3	5	4	8	8	2	22	20	19	7	3	5	2	297
5	Eurofarma RC	65	Ret	Ret	11	4	22	Ret	10	12	10	3	11	9	6	4	9	3	7	11	18	11	20	288.5
5	Eurofarma RC	90	14	4	16	17	25	3	16	9	Ret	11	10	**1**	10	**1**	13	12	**3**	20	Ret	16	14	288.5
6	Ipiranga-RCM	21	Ret	21	Ret	10	**1**	10	**1**	2	16	9	14	7	9	DSQ	**1**	9	5	6	8	18	Ret	276
6	Ipiranga-RCM	28	12	3	Ret	Ret	DNS	21	Ret	3	DSQ	19	8	3	1	12	24	Ret	23	13	16	15	15	276
7	Voxx Racing	5	Ret	8	21	8	19	5	20	16	19	24	23	26	14	11	Ret	DNS	Ret	21	Ret	DNS	19	236
7	Voxx Racing	73	4	5	3	9	15	Ret	6	11	7	4	9	5	11	13	Ret	13	13	24	9	1	13	236
8	Shell Racing	74	10	12	Ret	13	6	Ret	DNS	22	13	6	17	19	20	19	25	Ret	18	17	Ret	17	11	201
8	Shell Racing	77	2	1	13	7	14	Ret	5	27	8	2	2	25	25	DNS	17	22	4	9	Ret	DNS	18	201
8	Hot Car Competições	2	17	7	23	2	26	17	Ret	DSQ	Ret	27	22	12	Ret	Ret	10	**1**	15	8	10	**2**	Ret	201
8	Hot Car Competições	110	18	9	25	18	13	19	15	21	17	8	21	23	12	9	6	6	25	22	Ret	DNS	7	201
10	Vogel Motorsport	14	16	Ret	DNS	3	18	8	4	29	22	13	26	17	Ret	Ret	Ret	DNS	8	Ret	5	3	DSQ	195
10	Vogel Motorsport	88	1	28	14	**15**	9	1	19	15	26	29	15	16	Ret	24	5	5	32	DNS	2	Ret	Ret	195
11	RZ Motorsport	10	24	17	5	5	24	Ret	Ret	17	14	22	31	DNS	5	5	23	16	6	3	7	Ret	Ret	174
11	RZ Motorsport	25	8	13	6	22	7	Ret	DNS	19	20	10	25	24	Ret	26	Ret	DNS	Ret	Ret	15	Ret	10	174
12	Schin Racing Team	72	23	Ret	DNS	25	Ret	20	13	28	18	15	27	Ret	Ret	23	Ret	DNS	24	Ret	23	14	9	157
12	Schin Racing Team	80	3	6	4	11	11	7	Ret	26	9	1	Ret	15	26	DNS	4	7	22	5	Ret	DNS	Ret	157
13	C2 Team	70	Ret	18	15	Ret	8	4	18	13	Ret	DNS	13	11	15	14	16	Ret	20	Ret	17	12	12	152
13	C2 Team	83	19	Ret	8	Ret	DNS	22	24	18	5	Ret	19	10	16	17	14	Ret	11	DNS	11	8	Ret	152
14	Boettger Competições	26								23														66
14	Boettger Competições	43													22	25								66
14	Boettger Competições	46	Ret	15	24	Ret	DNS	13	9	Ret	6	28	24	18	17	16	DSQ	DSQ	12	16	20	23	Ret	66
14	Boettger Competições	57	22	24	22			18	12		24	16	32	Ret			20	Ret	30	Ret			16	66
14	Boettger Competições	63				Ret	DNS																	66
15	ProGP	8	25	20	17	23	Ret	Ret	DNS	Ret	15	20	20	27	19	18	18	15	16	18	19	13	8	62.5
15	ProGP	100	15	22	18	21	16	11	23	20	Ret	DNS	30	DNS	18	15	21	17	27	14	21	19	Ret	62.5
16	RC3 Bassani	12	20	25	12	27	10	14	14	14	Ret	21	16	13	21	22	11	10	29	25	Ret	DNS	Ret	42.5
16	RC3 Bassani	22									23	25												42.5
16	RC3 Bassani	26											29	DNS										42.5
16	RC3 Bassani	97																	28	26				42.5
17	Hanier Racing	7	Ret	27	19	26	23	Ret	21	DSQ	25	23			24	27	Ret	19	31	15	31	24	21	38
17	Hanier Racing	63											28	DNS										38
17	Hanier Racing	82	Ret	23	9	19	12	16	11	24	21	14	Ret	DNS	23	21	12	Ret	26	23	Ret	20	17	38
Pos	Team	No.	INT	SCZ1		BRA		GOI1		GOI2	CAS		CUR1		VEL		SCZ2		TAR		SAL		CUR2	Pts

Colour	Result
Gold	Winner
Silver	Second place
Bronze	Third place
Green	Points classification
Blue	Non-points classification
Blue	Non-classified finish (NC)
Purple	Retired, not classified (Ret)
Red	Did not qualify (DNQ)
Red	Did not pre-qualify (DNPQ)
Black	Disqualified (DSQ)
White	Did not start (DNS)
White	Withdrew (WD)
White	Race cancelled (C)
Blank	Did not practice (DNP)
Blank	Did not arrive (DNA)
Blank	Excluded (EX)
