= 2008 Stock Car Brasil season =

Car racing competition

Seasons
- ← 2007 2009 →

The 2008 Copa Nextel Stock Car was the 30th Stock Car Brasil season. It began on April 13 at the Interlagos and ended on December 7 at the same circuit, after twelve rounds. This season Volkswagen announced the retired from the championship.

== Teams and drivers ==
All drivers were Brazilian-registered.

Team	Car	No.	Driver	Rounds
Eurofarma RC	Mitsubishi Lancer	0	Cacá Bueno	All
Eurofarma RC	Mitsubishi Lancer	15	Antonio Jorge Neto	All
Nascar Motorsport	Mitsubishi Lancer	3	Thiago Medeiros	1–3
Nascar Motorsport	Mitsubishi Lancer	8	Carlos Alves	1–10
Nascar Motorsport	Mitsubishi Lancer	28	Juliano Moro	10–12
Nascar Motorsport	Mitsubishi Lancer	87	Ruben Fontes	4–9
Panasonic Racing	Peugeot 307	4	Júlio Campos	3–7, 9
Panasonic Racing	Peugeot 307	20	Ricardo Sperafico	All
Panasonic Racing	Peugeot 307	42	Ricardo Zonta	1–2, 8, 10–12
Boettger Competições	Chevrolet Astra	6	Alceu Feldmann	All
Boettger Competições	Chevrolet Astra	18	Allam Khodair	All
K-Med Racing	Peugeot 307	7	Thiago Marques	All
K-Med Racing	Peugeot 307	25	Renato David	9
K-Med Racing	Peugeot 307	70	Antônio Pizzonia	1–8, 10, 12
K-Med Racing	Peugeot 307	87	Ruben Fontes	11
JF Racing	Peugeot 307	9	Giuliano Losacco	All
JF Racing	Peugeot 307	51	Átila Abreu	All
Officer Motorsport	Mitsubishi Lancer	11	Nonô Figueiredo	All
Officer Motorsport	Mitsubishi Lancer	23	Duda Pamplona	All
Red Bull Racing	Chevrolet Astra	12	Hoover Orsi	All
Red Bull Racing	Chevrolet Astra	29	Daniel Serra	All
Nova/RR Competições	Peugeot 307	13	Andre Bragantini	All
Nova/RR Competições	Peugeot 307	20	Norberto Gresse	All
Sky Action Power	Peugeot 307	14	Luciano Burti	All
Sky Action Power	Peugeot 307	39	Tarso Marques	All
AMG Motorsport	Mitsubishi Lancer	17	Ingo Hoffmann	All
AMG Motorsport	Mitsubishi Lancer	63	Lico Kaesemodel	All
Terra Avallone	Mitsubishi Lancer	19	Rodrigo Sperafico	All
Terra Avallone	Mitsubishi Lancer	33	Felipe Maluhy	All
Vogel Motorsport	Chevrolet Astra	21	Thiago Camilo	All
Vogel Motorsport	Chevrolet Astra	27	Guto Negrão	All
Hot Car Competições	Chevrolet Astra	28	Juliano Moro	1–9
Hot Car Competições	Chevrolet Astra	72	Mario Romancini	10–12
Hot Car Competições	Chevrolet Astra	74	Popó Bueno	All
Medley-WA Mattheis	Peugeot 307	31	William Starostik	All
Medley-WA Mattheis	Peugeot 307	90	Ricardo Maurício	All
RC3 Bassani	Peugeot 307	35	David Muffato	All
RC3 Bassani	Peugeot 307	43	Pedro Gomes	All
Medley-A.Mattheis	Chevrolet Astra	77	Valdeno Brito	All
Medley-A.Mattheis	Chevrolet Astra	80	Marcos Gomes	All

== Race calendar and results ==
All races were held in Brazil.

Round	Circuit	Date	Pole position	Fastest lap	Winning driver	Winning team
1	Autódromo José Carlos Pace	April 13	Ingo Hoffmann	Cacá Bueno	Marcos Gomes	Medley-A.Mattheis
2	Autódromo Internacional Nelson Piquet	May 2	Ricardo Maurício	Ricardo Maurício	Ricardo Maurício	Medley-WA Mattheis
3	Autódromo Internacional de Curitiba	May 18	Valdeno Brito	Átila Abreu	Ricardo Maurício	Medley-WA Mattheis
4	Autódromo Internacional de Santa Cruz do Sul	June 21	Duda Pamplona	Allam Khodair	Cacá Bueno	Eurofarma RC
5	Autódromo Internacional Orlando Moura	July 5	Ricardo Maurício	Thiago Camilo	Ricardo Maurício	Medley-WA Mattheis
6	Autódromo José Carlos Pace	August 2	Marcos Gomes	Cacá Bueno	Marcos Gomes	Medley-A.Mattheis
7	Autódromo Internacional Nelson Piquet	August 31	Cacá Bueno	Allam Khodair	Valdeno Brito	Medley-A.Mattheis
8	Autódromo Internacional Ayrton Senna	September 13	Thiago Camilo	Thiago Camilo	Thiago Camilo	Vogel Motorsport
Super Final
9	Autódromo Internacional de Curitiba	September 21	Ricardo Maurício	Ricardo Maurício	Ricardo Maurício	Medley-WA Mattheis
10	Autódromo Internacional Nelson Piquet	November 9	Ricardo Maurício	Ricardo Maurício	Ricardo Maurício	Medley-WA Mattheis
11	Autódromo Internacional de Tarumã	November 22	Ricardo Maurício	Cacá Bueno	Cacá Bueno	Eurofarma RC
12	Autódromo José Carlos Pace	December 7	Cacá Bueno	Thiago Camilo	Thiago Camilo	Vogel Motorsport

=== Drivers' championship ===
Pos	Driver	INT	BRA	CUR	SCS	CAM	INT	RIO	LON	CUR	BRA	TAR	INT	Pts
Super Final
1	Ricardo Maurício	4	**1**	1	6	**1**	4	20	4	**1**	**1**	**3**	15	287
2	Marcos Gomes	1	2	2	20	2	**1**	3	6	2	2	2	Ret	285
3	Thiago Camilo	2	5	6	Ret	5	2	4	**1**	3	10	4	1	277
4	Cacá Bueno	3	Ret	5	1	Ret	3	**9**	8	Ret	17	1	**12**	243
5	Valdeno Brito	Ret	Ret	**3**	2	Ret	Ret	1	16	23	27	5	6	234
6	Giuliano Losacco	Ret	4	8	12	9	15	25	2	4	8	24	16	231
7	Popó Bueno	8	6	19	Ret	8	9	19	7	10	6	Ret	Ret	222
8	Átila Abreu	6	Ret	4	Ret	3	12	10	9	9	20	Ret	18	217
8	Alceu Feldmann	12	9	7	8	7	17	5	26	DSQ	21	6	21	217
10	Allam Khodair	16	18	23	3	20	5	6	3	DSQ	26	26	24	208
Super Final cutoff
11	Ingo Hoffmann	**Ret**	Ret	Ret	11	18	13	8	5	7	4	11	3	72
12	Luciano Burti	Ret	11	15	DSQ	6	Ret	2	29	21	15	7	10	52
13	Duda Pamplona	22	19	17	**7**	Ret	7	13	14	Ret	3	12	11	48
14	Rodrigo Sperafico	13	3	20	19	15	23	11	15	DSQ	23	8	8	45
15	Lico Kaesemodel	21	Ret	Ret	15	Ret	20	Ret	12'	6	11	14	4	36
15	Nonô Figueiredo	Ret	15	9	5	23	18	18	13	Ret	9	10	Ret	36
17	Antonio Jorge Neto	5	13	Ret	4	16	11	Ret	20	Ret	24	Ret	23	34
18	Pedro Gomes	11	Ret	Ret	Ret	4	Ret	15	25	12	14	Ret	9	33
19	Ricardo Sperafico	18	Ret	20	25	22	28	21	21	17	5	21	2	32
20	Juliano Moro	20	14	Ret	17	Ret	8	17	18	8	12	13	Ret	25
21	David Muffato	7	Ret	Ret	23	Ret	21	7	11	15	Ret	DSQ	Ret	24
21	Hoover Orsi	10	7	16	16	Ret	10	Ret	24	Ret	13	Ret	17	24
21	Felipe Maluhy	9	12	14	14	21	14	12	27	13	16	22	Ret	24
24	Ricardo Zonta	14	Ret						22		7	17	5	23
25	Júlio Campos			10	24	10	6	23		Ret				22
26	Thiago Marques	Ret	20	Ret	13	11	16	28	10	20	19	9	20	21
27	Tarso Marques	Ret	Ret	Ret	10	Ret	29	24	Ret	11	Ret	23	7	20
27	Daniel Serra	Ret	8	11	9	19	Ret	Ret	28	DSQ	22	16	19	20
29	William Starostik	Ret	22	Ret	22	13	Ret	27	19	5	Ret	Ret	14	17
30	André Bragantini	17	10	12	21	24	27	14	Ret	Ret	25	25	Ret	12
31	Antônio Pizzonia	15	Ret	DSQ	Ret	14	24	16	Ret		18		13	6
32	Carlos Alves	19	21	18	Ret	12	26	26	Ret	21	Ret			4
33	Renato David									14				2
34	Guto Negrão	Ret	23	21	18	Ret	19	Ret	Ret	18	Ret	15	Ret	1
	Norberto Gresse	Ret	Ret	Ret	Ret	Ret	22	22	23	16	Ret	19	Ret	0
	Ruben Fontes				Ret	17	25	Ret	17	19		18		0
	Thiago Medeiros	Ret	24	22										0
	Mario Romancini										DSQ	20	22	0
Pos	Driver	INT	BRA	CUR	SCS	CAM	INT	RIO	LON	CUR	BRA	TAR	INT	Pts

Colour	Result
Gold	Winner
Silver	Second place
Bronze	Third place
Green	Points classification
Blue	Non-points classification
Blue	Non-classified finish (NC)
Purple	Retired, not classified (Ret)
Red	Did not qualify (DNQ)
Red	Did not pre-qualify (DNPQ)
Black	Disqualified (DSQ)
White	Did not start (DNS)
White	Withdrew (WD)
White	Race cancelled (C)
Blank	Did not practice (DNP)
Blank	Did not arrive (DNA)
Blank	Excluded (EX)

**Bold** – Pole
Italics – Fastest Lap
