= Ricardo Maurício =

Brazilian racing driver (born 1979)

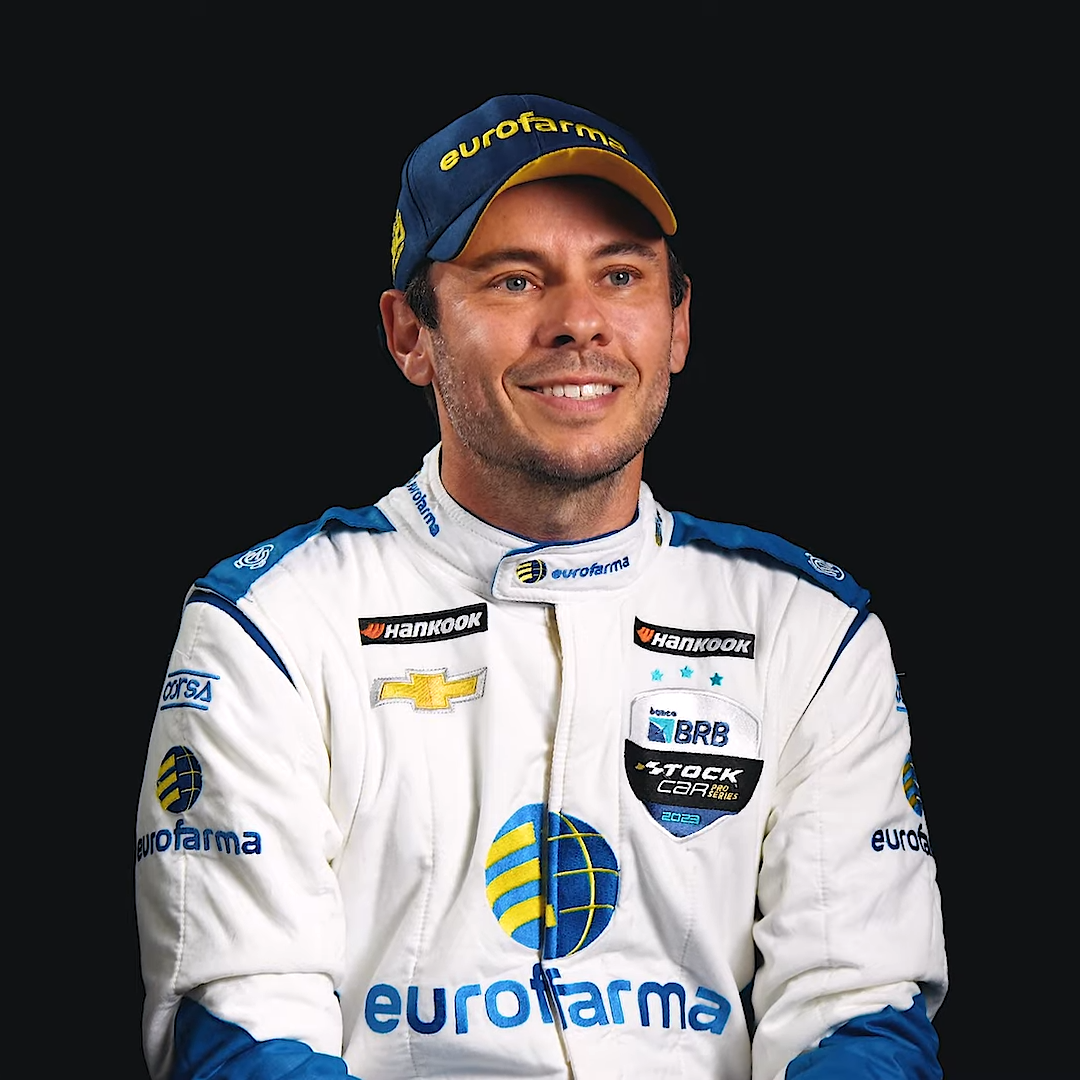
- Born: January 7, 1979 (age 47) São Paulo, Brazil

Stock Car Brasil career
- Debut season: 2004
- Current team: Eurofarma RC
- Categorisation: FIA Gold
- Car number: 90
- Former teams: Katálogo Racing; Andreas Mattheis Motorsport; L&M Racing; WA Mattheis
- Starts: 278
- Championships: 3 (2008, 2013, 2020)
- Wins: 30
- Poles: 17
- Fastest laps: 24
- Finished last season: 5th (2021)

Previous series
- 2009–2010 2007–2009 2004 2003 1999–2002 1997–1998 1996: Brasil GT3 Championship; TC 2000; World of Outlaws; Spanish Formula Three; International Formula 3000; British Formula 3 Formula Vauxhall

Championship titles
- 2012 2009 2008, 2013, 2020 2003 1995: Brasileiro de Marcas; TC 2000 Copa Endurance Series; Stock Car Brasil; Spanish Formula Three; Brazilian Formula Ford

Ricardo Maurício (born January 7, 1979) is a Brazilian racing driver. He currently drives in the Stock Car Brasil series, which he won in 2008, 2013 and 2020. Prior to this he raced in several European single-seater formulae, winning the Spanish Formula Three Championship and recording podium finishes in International Formula 3000.

== Career ==
=== Formula Vauxhall/Opel ===
Maurício was born in São Paulo. After some time spent kart racing, he moved up to formula racing in Brazil and won the local Formula Ford championship in 1995. For 1996, he moved to Europe, where he competed in Formula Vauxhall, finishing fourth in the championship. At the end of the year, he took part in the 1996 EFDA Nations Cup for Formula Opel cars, representing Brazil alongside compatriot Wagner Ebrahim and taking third place.

=== British Formula 3 ===
For 1997, Maurício drove for the works TOM'S-Toyota team in the British Formula 3 Championship, finishing joint 11th place in the championship with Darren Manning and just behind Kevin McGarrity, the best-placed driver with a TOM'S chassis. At the end of the season, he moved to the Alan Docking Racing team to compete in the Macau Grand Prix, but failed to finish the race.

Maurício remained in the championship for 1998, driving an ADR-run Dallara chassis, and improved to seventh place overall, with two podium finishes, well ahead of teammates Yudai Igarashi and Miku Santavirta. However, his performance was overshadowed by his compatriots Mario Haberfeld, Enrique Bernoldi and Luciano Burti, who dominated the championship between them, taking the top-three positions in the drivers' standings. He switched to champion team Paul Stewart Racing for the Macau Grand Prix, and finished the race in second place behind Peter Dumbreck.

=== Formula 3000 ===
Maurício moved up to International Formula 3000 for the 1999 season, driving for Super Nova alongside Jason Watt, but after a difficult start he was dropped after three races in favour of David Saelens. He moved to the Red Bull Junior Team-backed team run by Helmut Marko, replacing Markus Friesacher and partnering Bernoldi. Despite failing to qualify for three of the remaining races in a heavily oversubscribed field of drivers, he scored his first point at the Spa-Francorchamps circuit, placing him 22nd in the championship.

Maurício stayed with the team alongside Bernoldi for 2000, making up for a seven-race run of retirements at the start of the season by securing his first podium finish in the category at the Hungaroring, improving his final championship position to 17th. He was, however, overshadowed somewhat by Bernoldi, who scored just one more point but lost the lead in two races due to mechanical problems.

Maurício began the 2001 season without a drive, despite initially being reconfirmed at the Red Bull Junior Team alongside Patrick Friesacher, who replaced the Formula One-bound Bernoldi. The seat was taken by Antonio García for the first four rounds of the championship, but Maurício resumed it thereafter, becoming a consistent points-scorer on his way to eighth in the championship, including two more podium finishes.

Maurício remained at the team for 2002, but it was a disappointing season for him as he dropped to ninth in the championship, and was consistently outperformed by Friesacher. The highlight of the year was a podium finish in front of his home fans at the Interlagos circuit, where he completed a Brazilian 1-2-3-4 finish with Rodrigo Sperafico, Haberfeld and Antônio Pizzonia. However, he was best remembered for his large crash at Monza, in which his car was launched into a series of aerial rolls after running into the back of Rob Nguyen.

=== Spanish Formula Three ===
Dropped by the Red Bull Junior Team and unable to find an F3000 drive, Maurício stepped back to the Spanish Formula Three Championship, where he drove for the Racing Engineering team, initially sponsored by Marlboro. He won the championship, winning six of the thirteen races, ahead of local drivers Daniel Martin, Borja García and Andy Soucek, and comfortably ahead of a succession of six teammates. However, this series was less prestigious than the F3 championships in other countries, and was not enough to advance his formula racing career any further, despite topping a World Series by Renault test session during the winter off-season period.

=== Stock Car Brasil ===
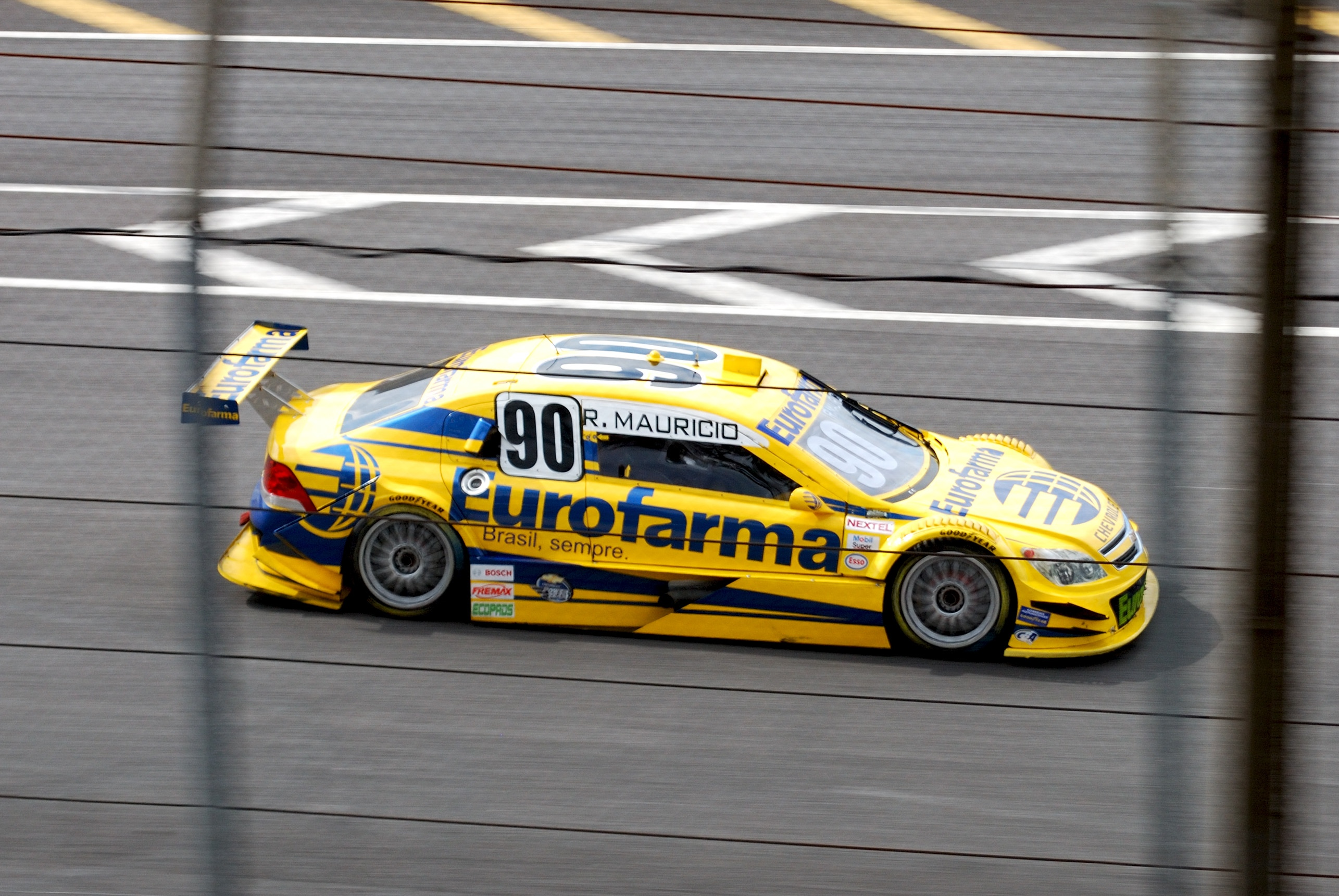
Maurício driving his RC Competições-run Chevrolet Astra in the 2009 Stock Car Brasil season.

For 2004, Maurício returned to Brazil to take part in the Stock Car Brasil championship, a common location for Brazilian ex-single seater drivers. He took part in five races for the Katálogo Racing and Andreas Mattheis Motorsport teams, finishing 23rd in the championship driving a Chevrolet Astra, taking a podium finish and fastest lap in the process. The following year, he committed to a full season in the series, driving a similar car run by the L&M Racing team. Another podium finish and fastest lap saw him improve to 16th in the championship.

Maurício returned to Katálogo for 2006, for whom he drove a Mitsubishi Lancer. He took his first pole position in the series and broke into the top ten in the drivers' standings for the first time. In 2007, he returned to Andreas Mattheis and the Chevrolet Astra in the form of the WA Mattheis team, a new outfit formed by the association of Mattheis and William Lube. He improved to ninth in the championship, taking his first win in the process.

For 2008, WA Mattheis switched cars to the Peugeot 307, which Maurício took to championship victory with five wins from the twelve races, narrowly beating the Astras of Marcos Gomes and Thiago Camilo in the process. It was Peugeot's first championship win in Stock Car Brasil history. In 2009, he moved to the RC Competições team, and once again raced an Astra. He was unable to successfully defend his championship, losing it to Cacá Bueno.

Maurício remained with RC Competições for 2010, driving a Chevrolet Vectra. He won two races and finished third in the championship, behind teammate Max Wilson and Bueno.

=== Brazilian GT3 ===
Maurício first competed in the GT3 Brasil Championship in 2009, winning four races for WB Motorsport and finishing fourth in the championship. For 2010, he drove a Lamborghini Gallardo with Bruno Garfinkel for the Scuderia 111 team and finished tenth in the championship.

=== Other series ===
Since his move into stock car racing, Maurício has also made occasional appearances in the American World of Outlaws series and the Argentine TC 2000 championship, winning the TC 2000's endurance series cup in 2009.

== Racing record ==
=== Career summary ===
Season	Series	Team name	Races	Poles	Wins	Points	Final Placing
1995	Brazilian Formula Ford	Techspeed	?	?	?	?	**1st**
1996	Formula Vauxhall	Peter Thompson Motorsport	?	?	?	?	4th
1996	EFDA Nations Cup	Team Brasil	1	?	0	N/A	**3rd**
1997	British Formula 3	TOM'S	13	0	0	26	11th
1997	Macau Grand Prix	Alan Docking Racing	1	?	0	N/A	NC
1998	British Formula 3	Alan Docking Racing	13	0	0	65	7th
1998	Macau Grand Prix	Paul Stewart Racing	1	?	0	N/A	**2nd**
1999	International Formula 3000	Super Nova Racing	3	0	0	0	22nd
1999	International Formula 3000	Red Bull Junior Team	7	0	0	1	22nd
2000	International Formula 3000	Red Bull Junior Team	10	0	0	4	17th
2001	International Formula 3000	Red Bull Junior Team	8	0	0	14	8th
2002	International Formula 3000	Red Bull Junior Team	12	0	0	9	11th
2003	Spanish Formula Three	Racing Engineering	13	4	6	192	**1st**
2004	Stock Car Brasil	Katálogo Racing	4	0	0	20	23rd
2004	Stock Car Brasil	A.Mattheis Motorsport	1	0	0	0	23rd
2004	World of Outlaws	Lippincott Racing	2	0	0	85	276th
2005	Stock Car Brasil	L&M Racing	12	0	0	47	16th
2006	Stock Car Brasil	Katálogo Racing	12	1	0	216	10th
2007	Stock Car Brasil	A.Mattheis Motorsport	12	0	1	221	9th
2007	TC 2000	Toyota Team Argentina	1	0	0	0	NC
2008	Stock Car Brasil	WA Mattheis	12	5	5	287	**1st**
2008	TC 2000	Toyota Team Argentina	1	0	0	0	NC
2009	Stock Car Brasil	Eurofarma RC	12	1	0	264	**3rd**
2009	TC 2000	Toyota Team Argentina	3	0	1	0†	NC†
2009	TC 2000 Copa Endurance Series	Toyota Team Argentina	3	0	1	45	**1st**
2009	GT3 Brasil Championship	WB Motorsport	13	0	3	166	4th
2010	Stock Car Brasil	Eurofarma RC	12	1	2	251	**3rd**
2010	GT Brasil GT3 class	Scuderia 111	16	1	0	118	10th
2010	Trofeo Linea Brasil	Sinal/Greco	11	0	0	29	13th
2011	Stock Car Brasil	Eurofarma RC	12	1	0	258	**2nd**
2011	TC 2000	Toyota Team Argentina	1	0	0	0	NC
2011	Top Race V6	Mitsubishi Racing	2	0	0	6	34th
2011	GT Brasil GT3 class	Scuderia 111	18	0	0	119	12th
2011	Brasileiro de Marcas	Officer ProGP	4	0	0	94	11th
2012	Stock Car Brasil	Eurofarma RC	12	0	0	189	**2nd**
2012	Brasileiro de Marcas	Full Time Sports	16	1	0	232	**1st**
2013	Stock Car Brasil	Eurofarma RC	12	1	1	218	**1st**
2013	Brasilero de Marcas	AMattheis Motorsport	12	1	1	218	**1st**
2014	Stock Car Brasil	Eurofarma RC	21	1	2	144.5	**2nd**

† - ineligible for points.

=== Complete International Formula 3000 results ===
(key) (Races in bold indicate pole position) (Races in italics indicate fastest lap)

Year	Entrant	1	2	3	4	5	6	7	8	9	10	11	12	DC	Points
1999	Super Nova Racing	IMO; 15	MON; Ret	CAT; Ret										22nd	1
1999	Red Bull Junior Team				MAG; DNQ	SIL; DNQ	A1R; 15	HOC; DNQ	HUN; 9	SPA; 6	NUR; Ret			22nd	1
2000	Red Bull Junior Team	IMO; Ret	SIL; Ret	CAT; Ret	NUR; Ret	MON; Ret	MAG; Ret	A1R; Ret	HOC; 14	HUN; 3	SPA; 7			17th	4
2001	Red Bull Junior Team	INT	IMO	CAT	A1R	MON; 6	NUR; 5	MAG; Ret	SIL; 7	HOC; 17	HUN; 2	SPA; 3	MNZ; 6	8th	14
2002	Red Bull Junior Team	INT; 3	IMO; Ret	CAT; 4	A1R; 15	MON; 7	NUR; 9	SIL; Ret	MAG; 10	HOC; Ret	HUN; 11	SPA; 5	MNZ; Ret	11th	9

=== Stock Car Brasil results ===
(key) (Races in bold indicate pole position) (Races in italics indicate fastest lap)

Year	Team	Car	1	2	3	4	5	6	7	8	9	10	11	12	13	14	15	16	17	18	19	20	21	22	23	24	Rank	Points
2004	Katalogo Racing	Chevrolet Astra	CTB; 3	INT; 13	TAR; Ret	LON; 15	RIO	INT	CTB	LON	RIO	BSB	CGD	INT; 25													23rd	20
2005	L&M Racing	Chevrolet Astra	INT; 19	CTB; 6	RIO; 20	INT; 4	CTB; Ret	LON; Ret	BSB; Ret	SCZ; 3	TAR; 22	ARG; Ret	RIO; 26	INT; 9													16th	47
2006	Katalogo Racing	Mitsubishi Lancer	INT; 10	CTB; Ret	CGD; 8	INT; 11	LON; 6	CTB; Ret	SCZ; 6	BSB; 5	TAR; Ret	ARG; Ret	**RIO**; 13	INT; 10													10th	216
2007	Medley-A.Mattheis	Chevrolet Astra	INT; 1	CTB; Ret	CGD; 6	INT; 6	LON; 3	SCZ; 5	CTB; 2	BSB; Ret	ARG; Ret	TAR; 16	RIO; Ret	INT; Ret													9th	221
2008	Medley-WA Mattheis	Peugeot 307	**INT**; 4	BSB; 1	CTB; 1	SCZ; 6	**CGD**; 1	INT; 4	RIO; 20	LON; 4	**CTB**; 1	**BSB**; 1	**TAR**; 3	INT; 15													**1st**	**287**
2009	Eurofarma RC	Chevrolet Vectra	INT; 2	CTB; 7	BSB; 14	SCZ; Ret	**INT**; 6	SAL; Ret	RIO; 3	CGD; 7	CTB; 1	BSB; 17	TAR; Ret	INT; 2													**3rd**	**264**
2010	Eurofarma RC	Chevrolet Vectra	INT; 20	CTB; 2	VEL; 1	RIO; 19	RBP; 2	SAL; 10	INT; 1	CGD; 3	LON; 6	SCZ; 3	**BSB**; Ret	CTB; 20													**3rd**	**251**
2011	Eurofarma RC	Chevrolet Vectra	CTB; Ret	INT; 3	RBP; 5	VEL; 3	CGD; 6	RIO; 8	INT; 8	SAL; 16	SCZ; 4	LON; 2	BSB; 5	VEL; 23													**2nd**	**258**
2012	Eurofarma RC	Chevrolet Sonic	INT; 3	CTB; 4	VEL; 2	RBP; 17	LON; 5	RIO; 3	SAL; 4	CAS; 19	TAR; 4	CTB; Ret	BSB; 2	INT; 2													**2nd**	**189**
2013	Eurofarma RC	Chevrolet Sonic	INT; 3	**CUR**; 2	TAR; 3	SAL; 1	BRA; 5	CAS; 6	RBP; 9	CAS; 26	VEL; 2	CUR; 4	BRA; 3	INT; 2													**1st**	**218**
2014	Eurofarma RC	Chevrolet Sonic	INT; 1; 14	SCZ; 1; 4	SCZ; 2; 16	BRA; 1; 17	BRA; 2; 25	GOI; 1; 3	GOI; 2; 16	GOI; 1; 9	CAS; 1 Ret	CAS; 2; 11	CUR; 1; 10	CUR; 2; 1	VEL; 1; 10	VEL; 2; 1	SCZ; 1; 13	SCZ; 2; 12	TAR; 1; 3	TAR; 2; 20	SAL; 1 Ret	SAL; 2; 16	CUR; 1; 14				14th	144.5
2015	Eurofarma RC	Chevrolet Sonic	GOI; 1; 1	RBP; 1; 4	RBP; 2 Ret	VEL; 1; 6	VEL; 2; 20	CUR; 1 Ret	CUR; 2 Ret	SCZ; 1; 4	SCZ; 2; 6	CUR; 1 DSQ	CUR; 2 DSQ	GOI; 1 Ret	CAS; 1; 4	CAS; 2; 3	MOU; 1; 4	MOU; 2; 3	CUR; 1; 3	CUR; 2; 2	TAR; 1; 7	TAR; 2 Ret	INT; 1 Ret				7th	173
2016	Eurofarma RC	Chevrolet Cruze	CUR; 1; 3	**VEL**; **1**; 21†	VEL; 2 DNS	**GOI**; **1**; 2	GOI; 2; 15	SCZ; 1; 5	SCZ; 2; 6	TAR; 1; 6	TAR; 2; 21	**CAS**; **1**; 19	CAS; 2; 11†	INT; 1 DSQ	LON; 1; 3	LON; 2; 8	CUR; 1; 2	CUR; 2; 18	GOI; 1 Ret	GOI; 2 DNS	CRI; 1; 12	CRI; 2; 1	INT; 1; 3				6th	207
2017	Eurofarma RC	Chevrolet Cruze	GOI; 1	GOI; 2	VEL; 1	VEL; 2	SCZ; 1	SCZ; 2	CAS; 1	CAS; 2	CUR; 1	CRI; 1	CRI; 2	VCA; 1	VCA; 2	LON; 1	LON; 2	ARG; 1	ARG; 2	TAR; 1	TAR; 2	GOI; 1	GOI; 2	INT; 1				
2018	Full Time Sports	Chevrolet Cruze	INT; 1	CUR; 1	CUR; 2	VEL; 1	VEL; 2	LON; 1	LON; 2	SCZ; 1	SCZ; 2	GOI; 1	MOU; 1	MOU; 2	CAS; 1	CAS; 2	VCA; 1	VCA; 2	TAR; 1	TAR; 2	GOI; 1	GOI; 2	INT; 1					
2019	Eurofarma RC	Chevrolet Cruze	VEL; 1	VCA; 1	VCA; 2	GOI; 1	GOI; 2	LON; 1	LON; 2	SCZ; 1	SCZ; 2	MOU; 1	MOU; 2	INT; 1	VEL; 1	VEL; 2	CAS; 1	CAS; 2	VCA; 1	VCA; 2	GOI; 1	GOI; 2	INT; 1					
2020	Eurofarma RC	Chevrolet Cruze	GOI; 1	GOI; 2	INT; 1	INT; 2	LON; 1	LON; 2	CAS; 1	CAS; 2	CAS; 3	VCA; 1	VCA; 2	CUR; 1	CUR; 2	CUR; 3	GOI; 1	GOI; 2	GOI; 3	INT; 1								
2021	Eurofarma RC	Chevrolet Cruze	GOI; 1	GOI; 2	INT; 1	INT; 2	VCA; 1	VCA; 2	VCA; 1	VCA; 2	CAS; 1	CAS; 2	CUR; 1	CUR; 2	CUR; 1	CUR; 2	GOI; 1	GOI; 2	GOI; 1	GOI; 2	VCA; 1	VCA; 2	SCZ; 1	SCZ; 2	INT; 1	INT; 2		
2022	Eurofarma RC	Chevrolet Cruze	INT; 1	GOI; 1	GOI; 2	RIO; 1	RIO; 2	VCA; 1	VCA; 2	VEL; 1	VEL; 2	VEL; 1	VEL; 2	INT; 1	INT; 2	VCA; 1	VCA; 2	SCZ; 1	SCZ; 2	GOI; 1	GOI; 2	GOI; 1	GOI; 2	INT; 1	INT; 2			
2023	Eurofarma RC	Chevrolet Cruze	GOI; 1	GOI; 2	INT; 1	INT; 2	TAR; 1	TAR; 2	BRA; 1	BRA; 2	INT; 1	INT; 2	VCA; 1	VCA; 2	GOI; 1	GOI; 2	VEL; 1	VEL; 2	BUE; 1	BUE; 1	VCA; 1	VCA; 2	BRA; 1	BRA; 2	INT; 1	INT; 2		

Sporting positions
Preceded by Marcel Costa	Spanish Formula Three Championship; Champion; 2003	Succeeded by Borja García
Preceded by Cacá Bueno	Stock Car Brasil; Champion; 2008	Succeeded by Cacá Bueno
Preceded by José María López; Anthony Reid	Winner of the 200 km de Buenos Aires; 2009 (with Norberto Fontana)	Succeeded by Bernardo Llaver; Mauro Giallombardo
Preceded by Cacá Bueno	Stock Car Brasil; Champion; 2013	Succeeded by Rubens Barrichello
Preceded by Daniel Serra	Stock Car Brasil; Champion; 2020	Succeeded by Incumbent
