= Marcos Gomes =

Brazilian racing driver

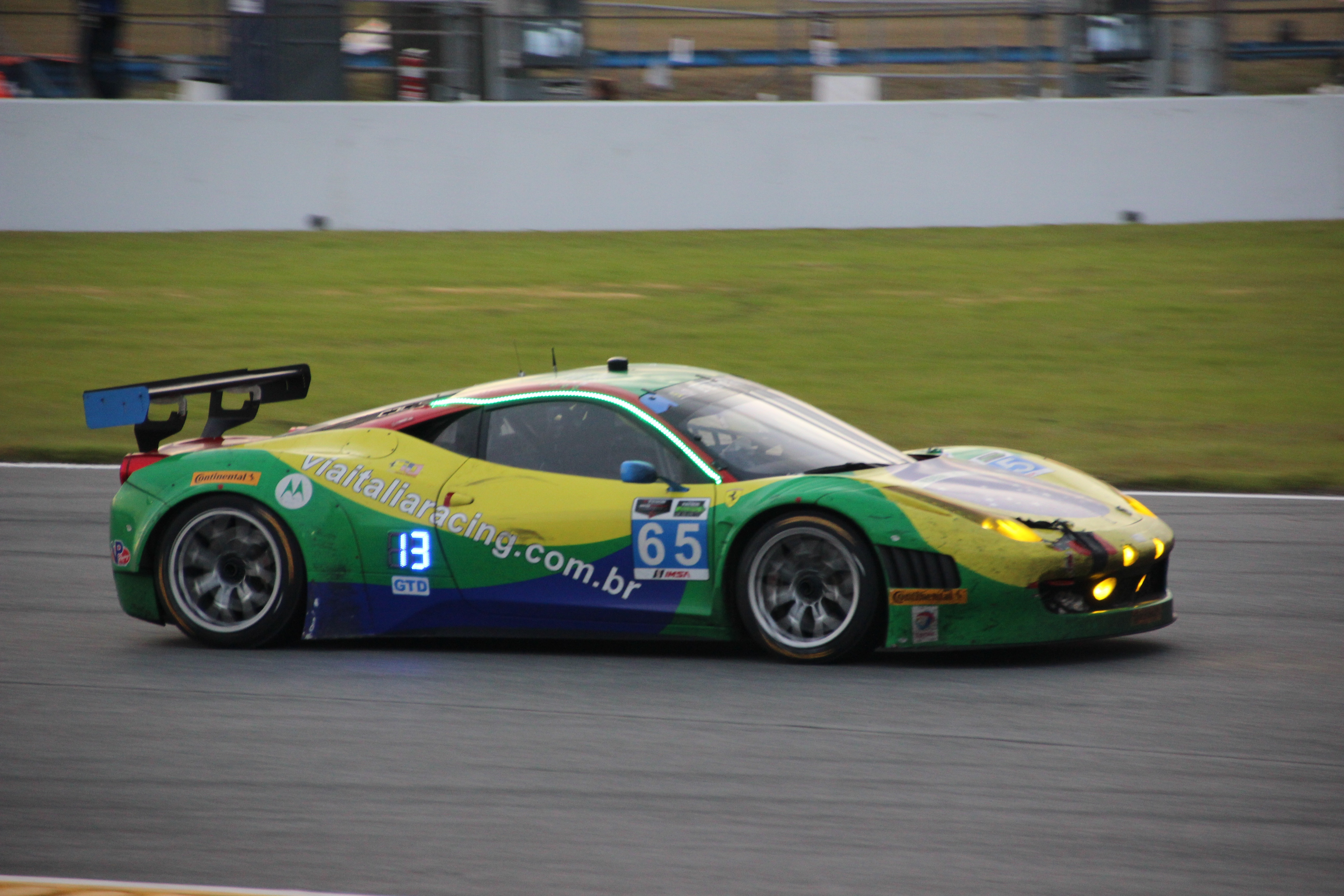
- Gomes in 2014
- Nationality: (Brazil) Brazilian
- Born: Marcos Giffoni de Melo Gomes; July 26, 1984 (age 42) Ribeirão Preto, São Paulo, Brazil

Stock Car Brasil career
- Debut season: 2007
- Current team: Cavaleiro Sports
- Categorisation: FIA Silver (until 2021); FIA Gold (2022–)
- Years active: 2006-
- Car number: 29
- Starts: 149
- Championships: 1 (2015)
- Wins: 12
- Podiums: 39
- Poles: 11
- Fastest laps: 0

Marcos Giffoni de Melo Gomes (born July 26, 1984) is a Brazilian professional racing driver currently set to compete in the Stock Car Brasil series for Cavaleiro Sports, where he won the 2015 championship. Marcos is the son of four-time Stock Car champion Paulo Gomes and brother of the also racing driver Pedro Gomes.

== Racing career ==
On July 5, 2009, Gomes won the fifth round of the season at Interlagos by Action Power, winning their fourth win in the category. At dawn on July 6, soon after the victory at Interlagos, the truck of Action Power team had an accident on the Highway Régis Bittencourt, destroying all the equipment including the car of Marcos Gomes. On occurred, the team officially announced that he was out of the season. Gomes joined RCM Motorsport for the rest of the season, but the team stayed with the Action Power name.

In 2012, Gomes was suspended for six months after he failed a drug test.

== Racing record ==
=== Career summary ===
Season	Series	Team	Races	Wins	Poles	F.Laps	Podiums	Points	Position
2002	Formula Renault 2.0 Brazil	Gramacho Racing	10	1	0	1	4	119	4th
2003	Formula Renault 2.0 Brazil	M4T Motorsport	10	0	0	0	2	62	10th
2004	North American Formula Renault 2000	GTI Team Roshfrans	8	2	4	?	5	205	**2nd**
2005	Stock Car Light Brasil	Nova/RR Competições	5	2	0	1	2	51	9th
2005	Formula Renault 2.0 Brazil	Piquet Sports	11	2	5	2	5	163	5th
2006	Stock Car Brasil	Sama-GomeSports	1	0	0	0	0	N/A	N/A
2006	Stock Car Light Brasil	Nova/RR Competições	9	4	2	1	7	160	**1st**
2007	Stock Car Brasil	Medley-A Mattheis	12	1	0	0	4	240	4th
2008	Stock Car Brasil	Medley-A Mattheis	12	2	1	0	9	285	**2nd**
2009	Stock Car Brasil	Action Power	12	1	0	1	2	248	6th
2010	Stock Car Brasil	Blau Full Time	12	0	2	0	3	229	7th
2010	GT Brasil	Blau Full Time	12	0	0	0	0	41	25th
2011	Stock Car Brasil	Medley Full Time	12	0	2	0	2	234	7th
2011	Trofeo Linea Brasil	Pater Racing	7	0	1	0	3	44	9th
2011	TC2000	Ford-YPF	1	0	0	0	0	N/A	N/A
2012	Stock Car Brasil	Medley Full Time	6	0	0	0	0	56	21st
2012	Brasileiro de Marcas	Serra Motosport	6	0	0	0	1	34	21st
2012	Copa Fiat Brasil	Pater Racing	1	0	0	0	0	N/A	N/A
2013	Stock Car Brasil	Schin Racing Team	12	2	1	1	3	102	10th
2013	Campeonato Sudamericano de GT	Blau Motorsport	2	1	1	0	2	37	10th
2014	Stock Car Brasil	Schin Racing Team	21	1	0	1	2	126	13th
2014	Brasileiro de Marcas	MMX Racing	1	0	0	0	0	N/A	N/A
2014	United SportsCar Championship - GTD	Scuderia Corsa	1	0	0	0	0	23	73rd
2015	Stock Car Brasil	Voxx Racing	21	3	6	2	8	242	**1st**
2015	United SportsCar Championship - GTD	Scuderia Corsa	1	0	0	0	0	1	59th
2016	Stock Car Brasil	Cimed Racing	21	2	0	5	5	212	5th
2017	Stock Car Brasil	Cimed Racing	21	0	0	2	4	200	8th
2017	Porsche Endurance Series	N/A	1	0	0	0	0	32	22nd
2018	Stock Car Brasil	Cimed Racing	21	1	2	4	4	202	7th
2018	Porsche Endurance Series	N/A	1	0	0	0	1	94	14th
2018	NASCAR K&N Pro Series East	NextGen Motorsports	5	0	0	0	0	173	19th
2018	Dopamina Endurance Brasil - GT3	Via Italia Racing	2	1	2	2	2	195	10th
2019	Stock Car Brasil	KTF Sports	19	0	1	1	1	178	9th
2019	IMSA SportsCar Championship - GTD	Via Italia Racing	1	0	1	1	0	23	51st
2019	Imperio Endurance Brasil - GT3	Via Italia Racing	3	1	2	1	1	310	6th
2019	Blancpain GT World Challenge	HubAuto Corsa	4	0	0	0	3	51	11th
2019-20	Asian Le Mans Series - GT	HubAuto Corsa	4	1	0	1	3	71	**1st**
2020	Stock Car Brasil	Cavaleiro Sports	19	0	0	1	0	88	21st
2020	Imperio Endurance Brasil - GT3	Via Italia Racing	3	1	2	1	1	310	6th
2020	European Le Mans Series - GTE	Kessel Racing	2	1	0	0	1	37	8th
2020	GT World Challenge Europe Endurance Cup	HubAuto Corsa	1	0	0	0	0	0	NC
2020	Intercontinental GT Challenge	HubAuto Corsa	1	0	0	0	0	0	NC
2021	Stock Car Pro Series	Cavaleiro Sports	23	0	0	0	0	216	11th
2021	Imperio Endurance Brasil - GT3	Mattheis Motorsport	1	0	0	0	0	105	12th
2021	IMSA SportsCar Championship - GTD	Scuderia Corsa	1	0	0	1	0	194	68th
2021	Asian Le Mans Series - GT	HubAuto Corsa	4	0	0	1	0	27	8th
2021	FIA World Endurance Championship - GTE Am	Aston Martin Racing	6	0	0	0	0	20	14th
2022	Stock Car Pro Series	Cavaleiro Sports	1	0	0	0	0	19	7th
2026	Porsche Carrera Cup Brasil								
2026	GT World Challenge Europe Endurance Cup	Razoon – more than racing							

=== Complete Stock Car Brasil results ===
Year	Team	Car	1	2	3	4	5	6	7	8	9	10	11	12	13	14	15	16	17	18	19	20	21	22	Rank	Points
2006	Sama-GomeSports	Volkswagen Bora	INT	CTB	CGD	INT	LON	CTB	SCZ	BSB	TAR	ARG	RIO; 27	INT											NC	0
2007	Medley-A.Mattheis	Chevrolet Astra	INT; Ret	CTB; Ret	CGD; 3	INT; 3	LON; 31	SCZ; 7	CTB; 3	BSB; 11	ARG; 14	TAR; 17	RIO; 16	INT; 1											4th	240
2008	Medley-A.Mattheis	Chevrolet Astra	INT; 1	BSB; 2	CTB; 2	SCZ; 20	CGD; 2	**INT**; 1	RIO; 3	LON; 6	CTB; 2	BSB; 2	TAR; 2	INT; Ret											**2nd**	**285**
2009	Dolly-Action Power	Chevrolet Vectra	INT; DSQ	CTB; 9	BSB; 5	SCZ; DSQ	INT; 1	SAL; 2	RIO; 5	LON; Ret	CTB; 4	BSB; 15	TAR; 4	INT; 12											6th	248
2010	Blau Full Time	Peugeot 307	INT; Ret	**CTB**; 6	VEL; 18	RIO; 2	RBP; 13	SAL; 7	**INT**; 2	CGD; 2	LON; 20	SCZ; 22	BSB; 15	CTB; 4											7th	229
2011	Medley Full Time	Peugeot 408	**CTB**; 14	INT; Ret	RBP; 6	VEL; 5	CGD; 3	RIO; 4	**INT**; 11	SAL; Ret	SCZ; 2	LON; 9	BSB; 6	VEL; 8											7th	234
2012	Medley Full Time	Peugeot 408	INT; 11	CTB; 5	VEL; Ret	RBP; 5	LON; 7	RIO; 21	SAL	CAS	TAR	CTB	BSB	INT											21st	56
2013	Schin Racing Team	Peugeot 408	INT; 13	CUR; 21	TAR; Ret	SAL; 7	BRA; DSQ	**CAS**; 1	RBP; 23	CAS; 1	VEL; 3	CUR; 7	BRA; Ret	INT; Ret											10th	102
2014	Schin Racing Team	Peugeot 408	INT; 1	SCZ; 1	SCZ; 2	BRA; 1	BRA; 2	GOI; 1	GOI; 2	GOI; 1	CAS; 1	CAS; 2	CUR; 1	CUR; 2	VEL; 1	VEL; 2	SAL; 1	SAL; 2	TAR; 1	TAR; 2	RBP; 1	RBP; 2	CUR; 1		NC	N/A
2015	Voxx Racing	Peugeot 408	GOI; 1	RBP; 1	RBP; 2	VEL; 1	VEL; 2	CUR; 1	CUR; 2	SCZ; 1	SCZ; 2	CUR; 1	CUR; 2	GOI; 1	CAS; 1	CAS; 2	MOU; 1	MOU; 2	CUR; 1	CUR; 2	TAR; 1	TAR; 2	INT; 1			
2016	Voxx Racing	Peugeot 408	CUR; 1	VEL; 1	VEL; 2	GOI; 1	GOI; 2	SCZ; 1	SCZ; 2	TAR; 1	TAR; 2	CAS; 1	CAS; 2	INT; 1	LON; 1	LON; 2	CUR; 1	CUR; 2	GOI; 1	GOI; 2	CRI; 1	CRI; 2	INT; 1			
2017	Cimed Racing	Chevrolet Cruze	GOI; 1	GOI; 2	VEL; 1	VEL; 2	SCZ; 1	SCZ; 2	CAS; 1	CAS; 2	LON; 1	LON; 2	CDC; 1	CDC; 2	CIT; 1	CIT; 2	TBA; 1	GAL; 1	GAL; 2	CUR; 1	CUR; 2	TAR; 1	TAR; 2	INT; 1		

=== NASCAR ===
(key) (Bold – Pole position awarded by qualifying time. Italics – Pole position earned by points standings or practice time. * – Most laps led.)

==== K&N Pro Series East ====
NASCAR K&N Pro Series East results
Year	Team	No.	Make	1	2	3	4	5	6	7	8	9	10	11	12	13	14	NKNPSEC	Pts	Ref
2018	NextGen Motorsports	55	Toyota	NSM	BRI; 12	LGY; 13	SBO; 4	SBO; 9	MEM; 10	NJM	TMP	NHA	IOW	GLN	GTW	NHA	DOV	19th	173	

^{*} Season still in progress
^{1} Ineligible for series points

=== Complete 24 Hours of Le Mans results ===
Year	Team	Co-Drivers	Car	Class	Laps	Pos.	Class Pos.
2020	(Taiwan) Hub Auto Racing	(Taiwan) Morris Chen (United Kingdom) Tom Blomqvist	Ferrari 488 GTE Evo	GTE; Am	273	DNF	DNF
2021	(United Kingdom) Aston Martin Racing	(Denmark) Nicki Thiim (Canada) Paul Dalla Lana	Aston Martin Vantage AMR	GTE; Am	45	DNF	DNF

=== Complete FIA World Endurance Championship results ===
(key) (Races in bold indicate pole position) (Races in italics indicate fastest lap)

Year	Entrant	Class	Car	Engine	1	2	3	4	5	6	Rank	Pts
2021	Aston Martin Racing	LMGTE Am	Aston Martin Vantage AMR	Aston Martin 4.0 L Turbo V8	SPA; 6	ALG; 4	MNZ; 2	LMS; Ret	BHR; 4	BHR; 10	8th	58

Sporting positions
Preceded by Rubens Barrichello	Stock Car Brasil; Champion; 2015	Succeeded by Felipe Fraga
