= 2010 Trofeo Linea season =

2010 Trofeo Linea Brasil

Seasons
- ← none 2011 →

The 2010 Trofeo Linea Brasil season is the first Trofeo Linea Brasil season. It began on 30 May at Autódromo Internacional Nelson Piquet and concluded on December 5 at Autódromo Internacional de Santa Cruz do Sul after six rounds.

The category part of Racing Festival, championship idealized by the Formula One driver Felipe Massa and his family.

After losing the title of Stock Car Brasil by a one point, Cacá Bueno won the debut season of the Trofeo Linea Brasil.

Bueno was the only driver to win more than a victory taking three wins, nine drivers won a victory, Popó Bueno and Ulisses Silva in Jacarepaguá, Cesinha Bonilha and Serafin Jr. in Londrina, Duda Pamplona at Interlagos, Giuliano Losacco and Clemente de Faria, Jr. in Pinhais, Christian Fittipaldi at Brasília and runner-up André Bragantini at Santa Cruz do Sul.

== Teams and drivers ==
All cars are powered by FPT engines and use Fiat Linea chassis.

Team	No	Driver	Rounds
GT Competições	0	(Rio de Janeiro (state)) Cacá Bueno	All
GT Competições	74	(Rio de Janeiro (state)) Popó Bueno	All
Fittipaldi Racing	1	(São Paulo (state)) Christian Fittipaldi	2–6
Fittipaldi Racing	7	(São Paulo (state)) Rodrigo Navarro	2–6
Officer/Acelera	6	(Rio de Janeiro (state)) Cláudio Contijo	1
Officer/Acelera	16	(Rio de Janeiro (state)) Ulisses Silva	All
Officer/Acelera	46	(São Paulo (state)) Luciano Kubrusly	3
Pater Racing	8	(Minas Gerais) Clemente de Faria, Jr.	All
Pater Racing	9	(São Paulo (state)) Giuliano Losacco	All
Full Time	10	(Paraná (state)) Alceu Feldmann	All
Full Time	13	(Paraná (state)) André Bragantini	All
W2 Racing	12	(Espírito Santo) Betinho Sartorio	All
W2 Racing	71	(Rio de Janeiro (state)) Serafin Jr.	All
Officer Motorsport	15	(Santa Catarina (state)) Raulino Kreis Jr.	4
Officer Motorsport	53	(São Paulo (state)) Fábio Carreira	5–6
Officer Motorsport	90	(Paraná (state)) Cesar Bonilha	2–5
Repecon Racing	17	(Santa Catarina (state)) Leonardo Nienkotter	All
Repecon Racing	18	(Santa Catarina (state)) Fernando Nienkotter	All
Fabio Greco	19	(São Paulo (state)) Luizito Massa	1
Fabio Greco	31	(São Paulo (state)) Antonio Jorge Neto	All
Engmakers Racing Team	21	(São Paulo (state)) Thiago Camilo	All
Engmakers Racing Team	44	(São Paulo (state)) Cesare Marruci	All
Pro GP	23	(Rio de Janeiro (state)) Duda Pamplona	2–5
Pro GP	118	(São Paulo (state)) Allam Khodair	6
Sinal/Greco	30	(São Paulo (state)) Ricardo Maurício	All
W Racing	80	(Paraná (state)) José Cordova	All
W Racing	90	(São Paulo (state)) José Vitte	All

== Race calendar and results ==
Round		Circuit	Date	Pole position	Fastest lap	Winning driver	Winning team
1	R1	(Rio de Janeiro (state)) Autódromo Internacional Nelson Piquet	May 30	(Rio de Janeiro (state)) Serafin Jr.	(Rio de Janeiro (state)) Serafin Jr.	(Rio de Janeiro (state)) Popó Bueno	GT Competições
1	R2	(Rio de Janeiro (state)) Autódromo Internacional Nelson Piquet	May 30		(Santa Catarina (state)) Leonardo Nienkotter	(Rio de Janeiro (state)) Ulisses Silva	Officer/Acelera
2	R1	(Paraná (state)) Autódromo Internacional Ayrton Senna	July 25	(Rio de Janeiro (state)) Cacá Bueno	(São Paulo (state)) Christian Fittipaldi	(Paraná (state)) Cesar Bonilha	Officer Motorsports
2	R2	(Paraná (state)) Autódromo Internacional Ayrton Senna	July 25		(Rio de Janeiro (state)) Cacá Bueno	(Rio de Janeiro (state)) Serafin Jr.	W2 Motorsports
3	R1	(São Paulo (state)) Autódromo José Carlos Pace	August 22	(Paraná (state)) André Bragantini	(Rio de Janeiro (state)) Cacá Bueno	(Rio de Janeiro (state)) Cacá Bueno	GT Competições
3	R2	(São Paulo (state)) Autódromo José Carlos Pace	August 22		(Paraná (state)) André Bragantini	(Rio de Janeiro (state)) Duda Pamplona	Pro GP
4	R1	(Paraná (state)) Autódromo Internacional de Curitiba	September 26	(Rio de Janeiro (state)) Duda Pamplona	(Paraná (state)) José Cordova	(São Paulo (state)) Giuliano Losacco	Pater Racing
4	R2	(Paraná (state)) Autódromo Internacional de Curitiba	September 26		(Minas Gerais) Clemente de Faria, Jr.	(Minas Gerais) Clemente de Faria, Jr.	Pater Racing
5	R1	(Federal District (Brazil)) Autódromo Internacional Nelson Piquet	October 17	(Rio de Janeiro (state)) Cacá Bueno	(São Paulo (state)) Thiago Camilo	(Rio de Janeiro (state)) Cacá Bueno	GT Competições
5	R2	(Federal District (Brazil)) Autódromo Internacional Nelson Piquet	October 17		(Paraná (state)) Alceu Feldmann	(São Paulo (state)) Christian Fittipaldi	Fittipaldi Racing
6	R1	(Rio Grande do Sul) Autódromo Internacional de Santa Cruz do Sul	December 12	(Rio de Janeiro (state)) Cacá Bueno	(Paraná (state)) André Bragantini	(Paraná (state)) André Bragantini	Full Time
6	R2	(Rio Grande do Sul) Autódromo Internacional de Santa Cruz do Sul	December 12		(Rio de Janeiro (state)) Cacá Bueno	(Rio de Janeiro (state)) Cacá Bueno	GT Competições

== Championship standings ==
- Points were awarded as follows:

Pos	1	2	3	4	5	6	7	8	9	10
Race 1	20	14	12	10	8	6	4	3	2	1
Race 2	15	12	10	8	6	4	2	1	0	

Pos	Driver	RIO (Rio de Janeiro (state))		LON (Paraná (state))		INT (São Paulo (state))		CUR (Paraná (state))		BRA (Federal District (Brazil))		SCS (Rio Grande do Sul)		Pts
1	(Rio de Janeiro (state)) Cacá Bueno	Ret	5	**13**	8	1	2	3	DSQ	**1**	2	**7**	1	102
2	(Paraná (state)) André Bragantini	2	2	11	5	**2**	4	15	DSQ	7	Ret	1	15	78
3	(Paraná (state)) Alceu Feldmann	9	3	2	7	10	15	6	4	5	5	3	7	72
4	(São Paulo (state)) Christian Fittipaldi			9	3	9	7	5	3	3	1	4	DSQ	71
5	(São Paulo (state)) Giuliano Losacco	7	8	7	2	6	3	1	7	20	10	Ret	7	61
6	(Rio de Janeiro (state)) Serafin Jr.	**15**	Ret	8	**1**	10	18	8	2	17	19	2	Ret	57
7	(Paraná (state)) Cesar Bonilha			1	Ret	DSQ	19	2	6	8	**3**			51
8	(Paraná (state)) José Cordova	4	6	17	12	3	5	12	16	2	DSQ	17	10	46
9	(Rio de Janeiro (state)) Popó Bueno	1	10	10	11	8	18	14	DSQ	4	4	8	**9**	45
10	(São Paulo (state)) Antonio Jorge Neto	3	4	4	9	14	9	17	17	17	7	6	8	40
11	(São Paulo (state)) José Vitte	5	DSQ	6	Ret	5	6	4	9	9	11	10	12	38
12	(Rio de Janeiro (state)) Duda Pamplona			5	6	8	**1**	**Ret**	10	14	16			30
13	(São Paulo (state)) Ricardo Maurício	12	7	3	4	13	17	18	Ret	6	8	Ret	DNS	29
14	(Minas Gerais) Clemente de Faria, Jr.	13	15	16	18	Ret	13	8	**1**	13	13	16	5	25
15	(Rio de Janeiro (state)) Ulisses Sliva	8	**1**	15	16	Ret	10	9	Ret	11	12	13	Ret	23
16	(São Paulo (state)) Allam Khodair											5	2	20
17	(São Paulo (state)) Thiago Camilo	11	15	12	10	15	Ret	DSQ	5	Ret	6	Ret	4	18
18	(São Paulo (state)) Rodrigo Navarro			14	13	18	12	18	8	16	14	9	3	12
19	(Santa Catarina (state)) Leonardo Nienkotter	7	12	21	14	11	14	10	11	Ret	Ret	14	13	7
20	(São Paulo (state)) Cesare Marrucci	10	DSQ	19	17	13	19	16	12	18	17	11	14	1
21	(São Paulo (state)) Fábio Carreira									10	9	15	DNS	1
	(Santa Catarina (state)) Fernando Nienkotter	14	9	18	DSQ	17	Ret	Ret	13	15	15	13	11	0
	(Espírito Santo) Betinho Sartorio	Ret	11	20	15	16	11	Ret	15	19	18	Ret	Ret	0
	(Santa Catarina (state)) Raulino Kreis Jr.							13	14					0
	(São Paulo (state)) Luizito Massa	Ret	14											0
	(Rio de Janeiro (state)) Claudio Contijo	16	16											0
	(São Paulo (state)) Luciano Kubusly					Ret	Ret							0
Pos	Driver	RIO (Rio de Janeiro (state))		LON (Paraná (state))		INT (São Paulo (state))		CUR (Paraná (state))		BRA (Federal District (Brazil))		SCS (Rio Grande do Sul)		Pts

Colour	Result
Gold	Winner
Silver	Second place
Bronze	Third place
Green	Points classification
Blue	Non-points classification
Blue	Non-classified finish (NC)
Purple	Retired, not classified (Ret)
Red	Did not qualify (DNQ)
Red	Did not pre-qualify (DNPQ)
Black	Disqualified (DSQ)
White	Did not start (DNS)
White	Withdrew (WD)
White	Race cancelled (C)
Blank	Did not practice (DNP)
Blank	Did not arrive (DNA)
Blank	Excluded (EX)

**Bold** – Pole
Italics – Fastest Lap
