= Clemente de Faria Jr. =

Brazilian racing driver

- Nationality: (Brazil) Brazilian
- Born: August 17, 1987 (age 39) Belo Horizonte (Brazil)

Copa Fiat Brasil career
- Debut season: 2010
- Current team: W2 Racing
- Car number: 8
- Former teams: Pater Racing
- Starts: 25
- Wins: 1
- Poles: 1
- Fastest laps: 2
- Best finish: 11th in 2011

Previous series
- 2008 2007-08 2006 2005-07: British Formula Three Championship; A1 Grand Prix (rookie driver); Brazilian Formula Renault; Formula Three Sudamericana

Championship titles
- 2007: Formula Three Sudamericana

Clemente de Faria Jr. (born August 17, 1987 in Belo Horizonte) is a Brazilian racing driver. He won the 2007 Formula Three Sudamericana championship with the Cesário Formula team, and was part of A1 Team Brazil as a rookie driver, during the 2007-08 A1 Grand Prix season. He would make appearances in the rookie sessions, at Taupo Motorsport Park in New Zealand and at Eastern Creek Raceway in Australia. He moved up to the British Formula Three Championship during the 2008 season, driving at Silverstone for Räikkönen Robertson Racing and at Donington Park with his Sudamericana-winning Cesário Formula team.

From 2010 onwards, Faria went back to Brazil and joined Pater Racing for Trofeo Linea Brasil.

== Racing record ==
=== Career summary ===
Season	Series	Team name	Races	Poles	Wins	Podiums	F/Laps	Points	Final Placing
2005	Formula Three Sudamericana	Cesário Formula	2	0	0	0	0	0	20th
2006	Formula Three Sudamericana	Cesário Formula	16	0	2	6	2	70	4th
2006	Formula Renault 2.0 Brazil	Cesário Formula	1	0	0	0	0	4	22nd
2007	Formula Three Sudamericana	Cesário Formula	16	10	8	13	9	122	1st
2008	British Formula Three	Räikkönen Robertson Racing	2	0	0	0	0	0	22nd
2008	British Formula Three	Cesario Formula	2	0	0	0	0	0	22nd
2010	Trofeo Linea Brasil	Pater Racing	12	0	1	1	1	25	14th
2011	Trofeo Linea Brasil	Pater Racing	4	0	0	0	0	41	11th
2011	Trofeo Linea Brasil	W2 Racing	8	0	0	2	1	41	11th
2012	Copa Fiat Brasil	W2 Racing	9	0	0	3	0	38	7th

Sporting positions
Preceded by Luiz Razia	Formula Three Sudamericana Champion; 2007	Succeeded by Nelson Merlo
