= WA Mattheis =

Brazilian auto racing team

(Brazil) WA Matheis
- Founded: 2007
- Team principal(s): William Lube; Andreas Mattheis
- Drivers' Championships: Stock Car Pro Series; 2008. Ricardo Mauricio; 2009. Cacá Bueno; 2011. Cacá Bueno

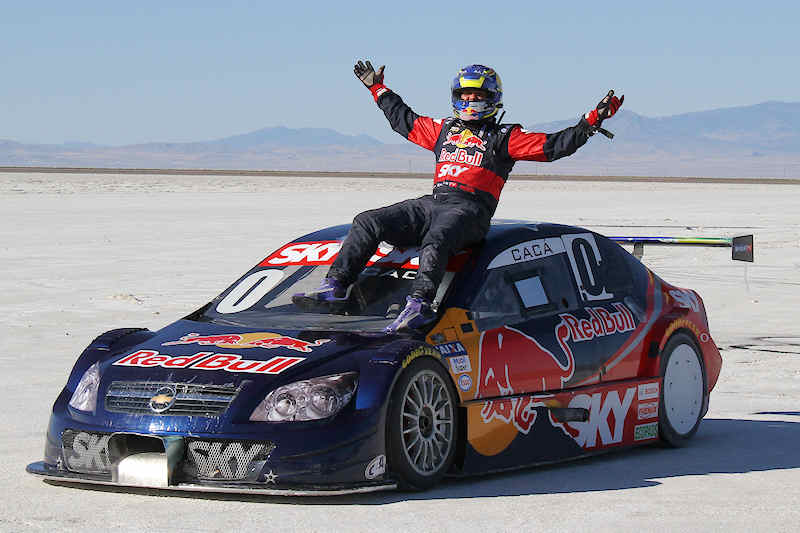
Bueno after running a Chevrolet Vectra on the Bonneville Salt Flats.

WA Mattheis/GT Competições was a Brazilian auto racing team based in Petropolis, Rio de Janeiro as a satellite team of A.Mattheis Motorsport. The team was owned by Andreas Mattheis and William Lube.

The team debuted in 2007 and won its first championship in 2008 as Medley-WA Mattheis. From 2009 until 2011 the team was sponsored by Red Bull and won the 2009 and 2011 championships. In 2012 started a partnership with Shell oil company. In 2013 the partnership of Andreas Mattheis and William Lube concluded. Mattheis sold the team to your son Rodolfo Matteis, creating R.Mattheis Motorsport, while Lube created a new team called Voxx Racing.

== See also ==
- A.Mattheis Motorsport
- R.Mattheis Motorsport
