= Allam Khodair =

Brazilian racing driver (born 1981)

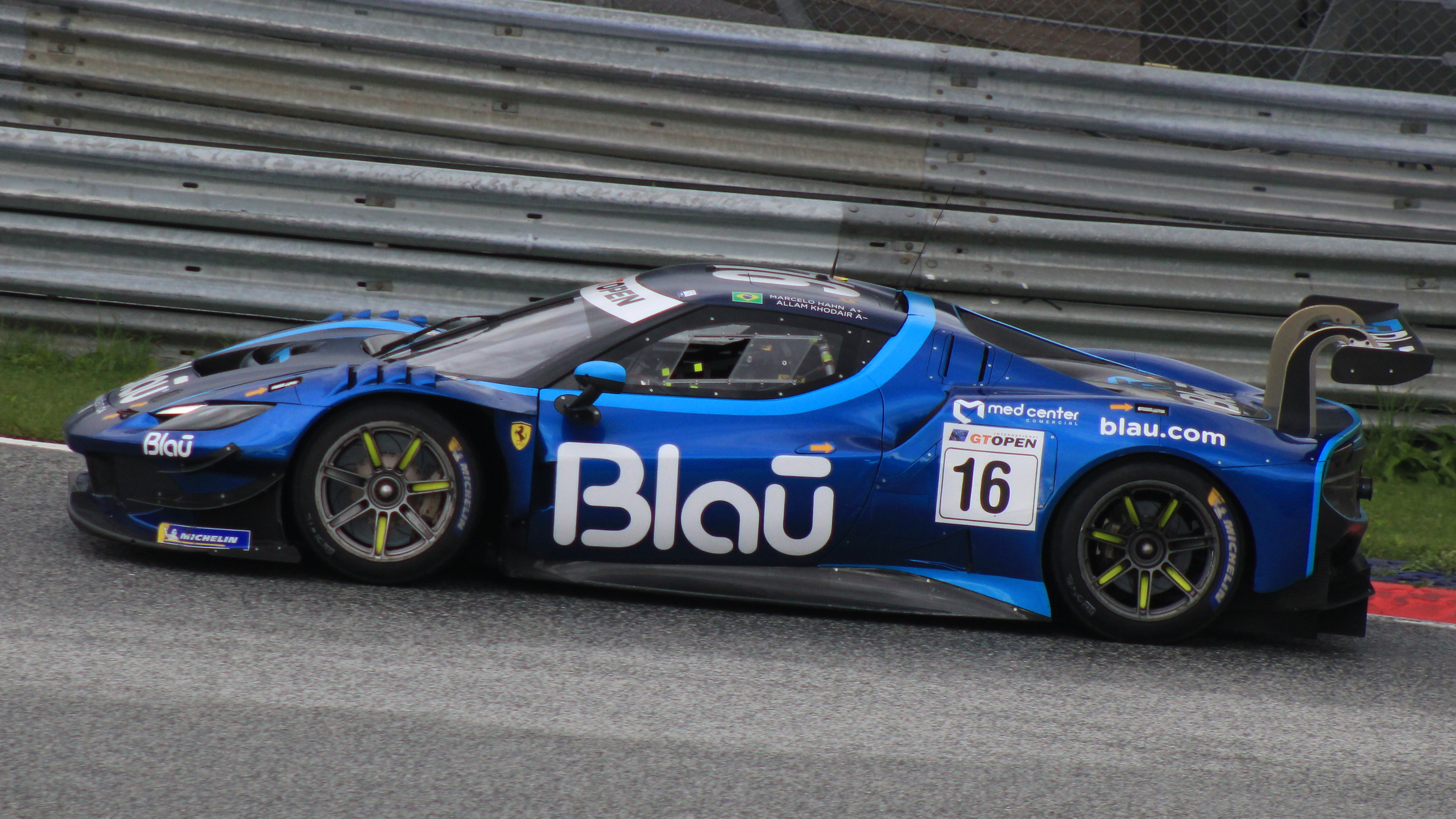
- Nationality: (Brazil) Brazilian
- Born: 15 May 1981 (age 45) São Paulo, Brazil

Stock Car Brasil career
- Debut season: 2005
- Current team: Blau Motorsport
- Categorisation: FIA Gold (until 2026); FIA Silver (2027–)
- Car number: 18
- Former teams: RS Competições; Boettger Competições
- Best finish: 3rd in 2010

Previous series
- 2006–07 2004 2003 2002–2003: A1 Grand Prix; Euro Formula 3000; Formula Renault 2000 UK; Formula Renault 2000 Brazil

Championship titles
- 2003: Formula Renault 2000 Brazil

Allam Khodair (born 15 May 1981) is a Brazilian racing driver, currently driving in Stock Car Brasil for Blau Motorsport. His mother is Japanese Brazilian and his father is Lebanese.

== Career ==
=== Karting ===
- 1999: Khodair wins the Brazilian karting championship; wins the Seletiva de Kart Petrobras race (the 12 best Brazilian drivers); and wins the São Paulo Championship
- 1998: Brazilian championship; wins the La Filliere selective race
- 1997: He wins the Brazilian championship; the São Paulo Championship; and the Parilla

Between 2000 and 2001, Khodair dedicate to his studies on the University of administration of Companies in FAAP with a dedication in the textile industry.

=== Formulas ===
In 2002, Khodiar returned to motorsport in the Brazilian Formula Renault 2.0 championship that he won the next season, in 2003. The same year, he ran two races in the Formula Renault 2000 UK.

In 2004, Khodiar joined the Euro Formula 3000. In the four final rounds of the 2006-07 season, Khodair replaced Alexander Khateeb in the A1 Grand Prix series for A1 Team Lebanon. He was allowed to race with the Lebanon team because of his Lebanese descent.

=== Touring car ===
Since 2005, Khodiar races in the Copa NEXTEL Stock Car with Boettger Competições team since 2006 driving Chevrolet Astra. Since 2007, Khodair has raced for Blau Motorsport.

=== Career summary ===
Season	Series	Team	Races	Poles	Wins	Podiums	Points	Position
2002	Formula Renault 2000 Brazil		10	1	1	3	133	3rd
2003	Formula Renault 2000 Brazil	Giaffone Racing	12	5	4	6	186	1st
2003	Formula Renault 2000 UK	Manor Motorsport	2	0	0	0	20	29th
2004	Superfund Euro Formula 3000	ADM Motorsport	11	0	0	0	0	12th
2005	Stock Car Brasil	RS Competições	11	0	0	0	0	38th
2006	Stock Car Brasil	Boettger Competições	12	0	0	0	32	20th
2006-07	A1 Grand Prix	A1 Team Lebanon	8	0	0	0	0	23rd
2007	Stock Car Brasil	Boettger Competições	11	0	0	1	20	26th
2008	Stock Car Brasil	Boettger Competições	12	0	0	2	208	10th
2008	GT3 Brasil Championship	Blausiegel	12	0	0	3	24	13th
2009	Stock Car Brasil	Full Time Competições	11	2	2	2	260	4th
2009	GT3 Brasil Championship	Blausiegel	16	0	2	11	216	2nd
2010	Stock Car Brasil	Blau Full Time	12	1	2	3	251	3rd
2010	GT Brasil GT3 class	Blau Full Time Lamborghini	16	0	0	8	169	2nd
2010	Trofeo Linea Brasil	Pro GP	2	0	0	1	20	16th

== Racing record ==
=== Complete Stock Car Brasil results ===
Year	Team	Car	1	2	3	4	5	6	7	8	9	10	11	12	13	14	15	16	17	18	19	20	21	Rank	Points
2005	RS Competições	Chevrolet Astra	INT; 16	CTB; 24	RIO; Ret	INT; Ret	CTB; 20	LON; Ret	BSB; Ret	SCZ; Ret	TAR; 19	ARG; 22	RIO; 24	INT; 19										NC	0
2006	Boettger Competições	Chevrolet Astra	INT; Ret	CTB; Ret	CGD; Ret	INT; 7	LON; Ret	CTB; 9	SCZ; 23	BSB; 10	TAR; Ret	ARG; 28	RIO; Ret	INT; 6										20th	32
2007	Boettger Competições	Chevrolet Astra	INT; 18	CTB; 3	CGD; 24	INT; 23	LON; 21	SCZ; 21	CTB; Ret	BSB; Ret	ARG; Ret	TAR; 12	RIO; 27	INT; 15,										26th	20
2008	Boettger Competições	Chevrolet Astra	INT; 16	BSB; 18	CTB; 23	SCZ; 3	CGD; 20	INT; 5	RIO; 6	LON; 3	CTB; DSQ	BSB; 26	TAR; 26	INT; 24										10th	208
2009	Full Time Sports	Peugeot 307	INT; 8	CTB; 19	BSB; 1	SCZ; 13	INT; Ret	SAL; 13	RIO; Ret	CGD; 6	CTB; Ret	BSB; 1	TAR; 5	INT; 10										4th	240
2010	Full Time Sports	Peugeot 307	INT; Ret	CTB; 1	VEL; Ret	RIO; 4	RBP; 10	SAL; 24	INT; 13	CGD; 8	LON; 10	SCZ; 1	BSB; 5	CTB; Ret										3rd	251
2011	Vogel Motorsport	Chevrolet Vectra	CTB; 23	INT; Ret	RBP; 4	VEL; Ret	CGD; 2	RIO; 6	INT; 14	SAL; 14	SCZ; 19	LON; 6	BSB; 2	VEL; 12										5th	240
2012	Vogel Motorsport	Chevrolet Sonic	INT; 4	CTB; 18	VEL; Ret	RBP; Ret	LON; 30	RIO; 1	SAL; 1	CAS; 3	TAR; 11	CTB; 2	BSB; 24	INT; 20										10th	118
2013	Vogel Motorsport	Chevrolet Sonic	INT; 7	CUR; 18	TAR; 8	SAL; 17	BRA; 20	CAS; DSQ	RBP; Ret	CAS; DSQ	VEL; Ret	CUR; 12	BRA; 23	INT; 4										14th	78
2014	Full Time Sports	Chevrolet Sonic	INT; 1 Ret	SCZ; 1; 10	SCZ; 2; 20	BRA; 1; 14	BRA; 2; 17	GOI; 1; 6	GOI; 2; 17	INT; 1; 7	CAS; 1; 12	CAS; 2 Ret	CUR; 1; 3	CUR; 2; 20	VEL; 1; 7	VEL; 2; 3	SAL; 1; 3	SAL; 2; 21	CUR; 1; 2	CUR; 2; 19	TAR; 1; 1	TAR; 2; 21	BRA; 1; 5	4th	185

=== Complete FIA GT Series results ===
Year	Team	Car	Class	1	2	3	4	5	6	7	8	9	10	11	12	Pos.	Points
2013	BMW Sport Trophy Team Brasil	BMW Z4 GT3	Pro	NOG; QR; 7	NOG; CR; 9	ZOL; QR; 11	ZOL; CR; 8	ZAN; QR; 5	ZAN; CR; 7	SVK; QR; 7	SVK; CR; DNS	NAV; QR; 10	NAV; CR; 12	BAK; QR; 8	BAK; CR; Ret	10th	40
