= Velopark (Brazil) =

Motorsport circuit in Rio Grande do Sul, Brazil

Autodromo FuelTech Velopark
- Full Circuit (2010–present)
- Location: Nova Santa Rita, Rio Grande do Sul, Brazil
- Coordinates: 29°49′22″S 51°19′15″W
- Opened: 2 May 2010; 16 years ago
- Former names: Velopark (2010–2025)
- Major events: Current: Stock Car Pro Series (2010–2019, 2022–present); Future: Fórmula Truck (2015, 2017, 2023, 2027); Former: TCR South America (2023); TCR Brazil (2023); Copa Truck (2019); Porsche Cup Brasil (2010–2011); Formula 3 Brasil (2014–2016); Campeonato Sudamericano de GT (2010–2011, 2013); F3 Sudamericana (2010–2011)
- Website: http://www.velopark.com.br/

Full Circuit (2010–present)
- Length: 2.278 km (1.415 mi)
- Turns: 11
- Race lap record: 0:48.668 ( (Brazil) Pedro Piquet, Dallara F309, 2015, F3)

Original Test Circuit (2010–present)
- Length: 2.153 km (1.338 mi)
- Turns: 10

FuelTech Motorsports Park (Autodromo FuelTech Velopark in Portuguese) is a motorsport centre opened in 2008, located in the city of Nova Santa Rita, Rio Grande do Sul, Brazil. It was designed to have various layouts so that it could accommodate a wide variety of vehicles, such as karts, dragsters, and formula and touring cars.

The Velopark consists of a main racecourse, a straight for dragsters, and three kart tracks including an oval, the only oval made for karts in South America.

The circuit received its name after FuelTech, a Brazilian manufacturer of engine management systems, acquired naming rights for the 2026 season.

== Racecourse ==
The track is composed of eleven turns and two long straights, for a total length of 2.278 km (1.415 mi).

Its first official race was held in May 2010 for Stock Car Brasil. It was won by Ricardo Maurício. This track has nine curves and three sectors with two DRS zones. The circuit also hosted the Brazilian Formula Three Championship.

== Lap records ==
As of June 2025, the fastest official lap records at the Velopark are listed as:

Category	Time	Driver	Vehicle	Event
Full Circuit (2010–present): 2.278 km (1.415 mi)
Formula Three	0:48.668	Pedro Piquet	Dallara F309	2015 Velopark Formula 3 Brasil round
Porsche Carrera Cup	0:52.943	Miguel Paludo	Porsche 911 (997 II) GT3 Cup S	2010 Velopark Porsche Cup Brasil round
GT3	0:52.958	Allam Khodair	Lamborghini Gallardo LP600+ GT3	2013 Velopark Campeonato Sudamericano de GT round
Stock Car Brasil	0:53.931	Thiago Camilo	Chevrolet Cruze Stock Car	2019 1st Velopark Stock Car Brasil round
Formula Future Fiat	0:56.918	Luir Miranda	Signatech-Fiat Formula Futuro	2011 Velopark Formula Futuro Fiat round
Stock Light	0:57.025	Alfredinho Ibiapina	Chevrolet Cruze JL-G12	2025 Velopark Stock Light round
GT4	0:58.030	Alan Hellmeister	Aston Martin V8 Vantage GT4	2011 Velopark GT Brasil round
Trofeo Maserati	1:03.189	Renan Guerra	Maserati Trofeo Light	2010 Velopark GT Brasil round
Turismo Nacional BR	1:05.486	Alberto Cattucci	Chevrolet New Onix	2025 Velopark Turismo Nacional Brasil round
TCR Touring Car	1:07.062	Diego Nunes	Toyota GR Corolla Sport TCR	2023 Velopark TCR South America round
Truck racing	1:09.961	Djalma Fogaça	Ford Truck	2015 Velopark Fórmula Truck round
