= Autódromo Internacional de Brasília =

Motorsport venue in Brasília, Brazil

- Full Circuit (1974–2014)
- Location: Brasília, Brazil
- Coordinates: 15°46′34.1″S 47°54′0.3″W
- FIA Grade: 4
- Owner: Banco de Brasília (2022–2052); Terracap (2007–2021); NZ Empreendimentos (1995–2006)
- Broke ground: 1972
- Opened: 3 February 1974; 52 years ago Re-opened: November 2025; 1 year ago (planned)
- Closed: 2014
- Architect: Samuel Dias
- Former names: Autódromo Internacional Nelson Piquet (1987–present); Autódromo de Brasília (1974–1987)
- Major events: Current: Stock Car Pro Series (1979–1981, 1983–1986, 1988–1992, 1994–2014, 2025–present); NASCAR Brasil Series (2026); Copa Truck (2026); Porsche Cup Brasil (2026); Former: Formula One Grande Premio Presidente Emilio Medici (1974, non-championship race); BPR Global GT Series (1996, non-championship race); Fórmula Truck (2002–2014); F3 Sudamericana (1988, 1990–1993, 1995–2011, 2013); Formula 3 Brasil (2014); GT3 Brasil (2008); Mil Milhas Brasil (1997)

Full Circuit (2025–present)
- Surface: Asphalt
- Length: 5.380 km (3.343 mi)
- Turns: 16
- Race lap record: 1:54.903 ( (Brazil) Fabricio Fogaça, Tatuus F4-T421, 2026, F4)

Alternative Circuit (2025–present)
- Surface: Asphalt
- Length: 5.321 km (3.306 mi)
- Turns: 14

Principal Motorcycle Circuit (2025–present)
- Surface: Asphalt
- Length: 5.349 km (3.324 mi)
- Turns: 16

Alternative Motorcycle Circuit (2025–present)
- Surface: Asphalt
- Length: 5.476 km (3.403 mi)
- Turns: 14

External Circuit (2025–present)
- Surface: Asphalt
- Length: 2.828 km (1.757 mi)
- Turns: 7

External Motorcycle Circuit (2025–present)
- Surface: Asphalt
- Length: 2.530 km (1.572 mi)
- Turns: 7

Original Full Circuit (1974–2014)
- Surface: Asphalt
- Length: 5.476 km (3.403 mi)
- Turns: 12
- Race lap record: 1:47.696 ( (Brazil) Clemente de Faria Jr., Dallara F301, 2007, F3)

Original Outer Circuit (1974–2014)
- Surface: Asphalt
- Length: 2.919 km (1.814 mi)
- Turns: 5
- Race lap record: 0:52.995 ( (Brazil) Pedro Piquet, Dallara F309, 2014, F3)

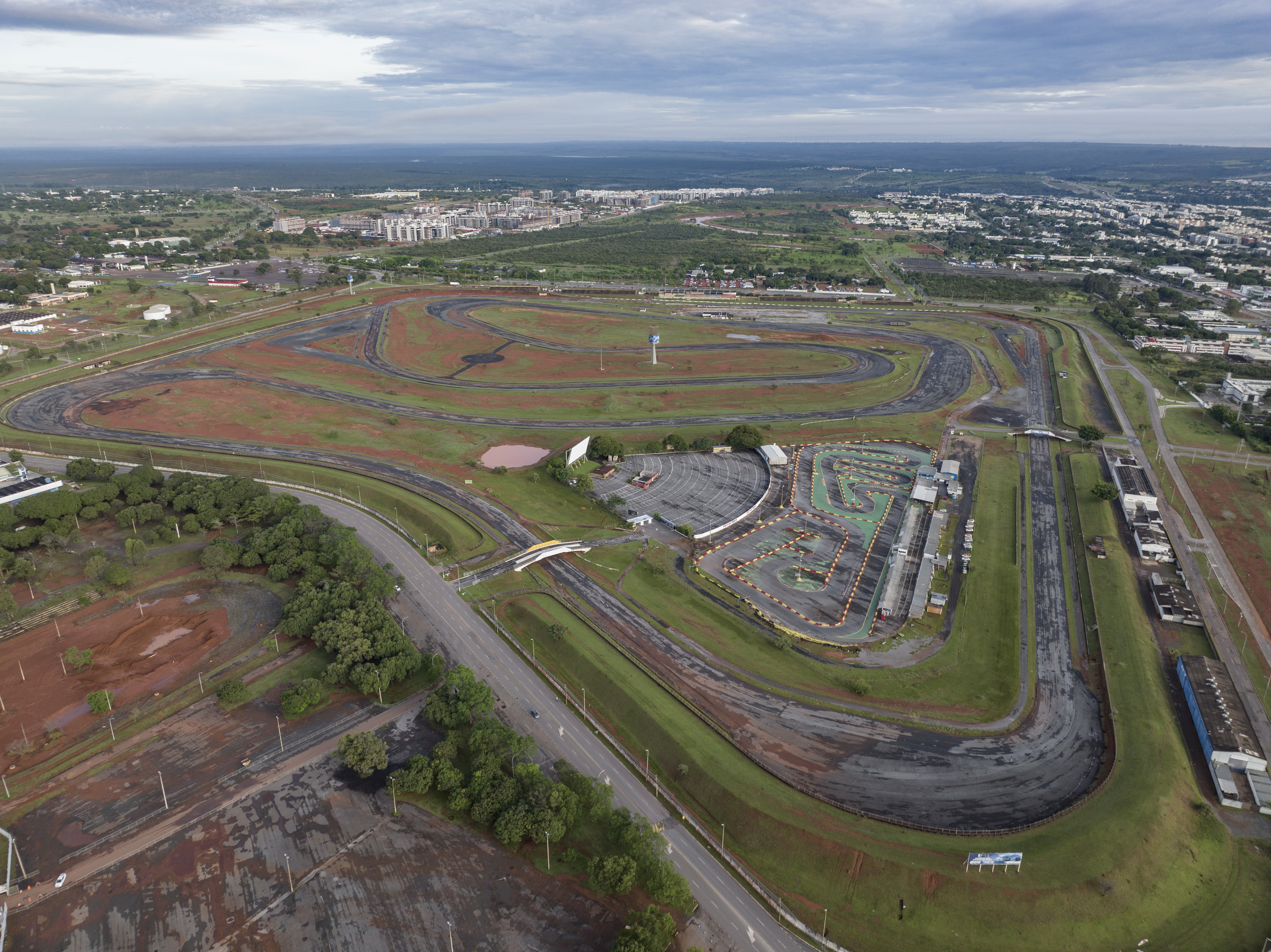
Aerial view, 2022

Autódromo Internacional de Brasília Nelson Piquet is a racing circuit in Brasília, the capital of Brazil. It is 5.380 km (3.343 mi) in length that hosted a variety of national-level series including Stock Car Brasil, Formula Truck and Formula 3 Brasil. The track was initially opened in 1974, and hosted non-championship rounds for both Formula One and the BPR Global GT Series, and in recent years was scheduled to host both MotoGP and IndyCar, but due to costs and construction delays, neither event went ahead. Autódromo de Brasília, the circuit's name was later changed to honor Formula 1 World Champion Nelson Piquet. The track, which has been closed since 2014, is undergoing renovations that started in 2022 and were set to be completed at the end of 2023. After delays, the circuit was opened at the end of 2025, hosting the penultimate round of the 2025 Stock Car Pro Series.

== Location ==
The circuit is located in Brasília, which is located in the Federal District, in Brazil. It is located across the road from Brasília's Estádio Nacional, which was a venue of the 2014 FIFA World Cup, and the Nilson Nelson Gymnasium. Both venues are part of the Ayrton Senna Sports Complex.

== History ==
=== Early history ===
The circuit opened in 1974, named Autódromo de Brasília, and was built to provide a permanent home for motor racing in the relatively new city of Brasília. Prior to this, races had been held on temporary street circuits in the city, although it was determined that a permanent circuit would be necessary to attract major events such as Formula One. Construction had begun in 1972 and took two years to complete, with the circuit being designed by engineer Samuel Dias.

To celebrate the circuit's opening, a non-championship Formula One race, the Grande Premio Presidente Emilio Medici, was held on 3 February 1974, one week after the official Brazilian Grand Prix. Around 85,000 spectators attended the event, which was competed between just 12 cars, with local driver Emerson Fittipaldi claiming victory. Following Emilio Medici's succession in the 1974 presidential election, the circuit was renamed to Autódromo de Brasília and continued to host a variety of national-level series for the following two decades.

=== Nelson Piquet ownership (1995–2006) ===
From 1995, the circuit was leased to NZ Empreendimentos, owned by Nelson Piquet, by the Government of the Federal District. Following this. the circuit underwent refurbishment, involving the installation of gravel traps, tyre barriers and lighting in order to bring the venue up to modern safety standards and allow it host international events again. In 1996, the circuit hosted a non-championship promotional race of the BPR Global GT Series. The event, held on 16 December 1996, was called the 2 Hours of Brasília and was won by the BMW Motorsport entry consisting of Nelson Piquet and Johnny Cecotto. The event had been run in tandem with another promotional race held in Brazil, the 2 Hours Curitiba, which was held the weekend before the race in Brasília. The following year the BPR Global GT Series became the FIA GT Championship, and the Brazilian races ultimately proved to be a one-off. There was discussion in 1997 about the possibility of Formula 1 returning to the circuit, with a proposal initiated by Nelson Piquet to move the Brazilian Grand Prix from Interlagos to Brasília from 1999 onwards, but this proposal was short-lived. In 2006, the Federal District regained management of the circuit due to NZ Empreendimentos' lack of attention to the track's management.

=== Refurbishment attempts (2006–2021) ===
On 19 August 2013 it was announced that the circuit would host a round of the MotoGP World Championship from the 2014 season onward, with the inaugural event scheduled for 28 September. In preparation for the series' return, major upgrades were planned for the circuit's facilities and the circuit itself was to receive a substantial reconfiguration in order to make it safer and suitable for hosting international events. However, the event organizers were unable to secure funding to the complete the work in time and the event was removed from the final calendar on 24 February 2014.

Another major announcement came on 18 September 2014, when it was confirmed that the circuit would host the opening round of the 2015 Indycar Series on March 8. Work to upgrade the circuit was resumed, using a combination of private funds and backing from the Government of the Federal District. The proposed circuit reconfiguration was less ambitious than that proposed for the MotoGP return, with the general layout retained and work mostly consisting of reprofiling corners, adding chicanes and relocating the pit lane. In January 2015 it was decided that, due to a lack of funding, the changes would be scaled back, with the pit lane remaining in its existing location, and just four corners being modified. However, on 29 January 2015, it was announced that the race had been cancelled as the newly elected district government deemed the event to be a waste of public funds, in the midst of a growing financial crisis for the district. This came as a shock, even to the event promoters, as more than two-thirds of the tickets had already been sold and a title sponsor had been acquired just one day prior to the cancellation. Following the announcement, construction work was halted with the circuit left in its half-finished state. The district governor initially committed to having the work complete by 26 April, so the circuit could host its scheduled round of the Stock Car Brasil series, however the event has now been rescheduled to September due to delays with construction works.

=== BRB ownership (2022–present) ===
After the lack of progress with construction and restructuring, on 13 May 2022, Banco de Brasília (BRB) signed an agreement with the Government of the Federal District, that transferred ownership of the circuit and its facilities from previous owners Terracap. The deal also entails a R$60 million investment for the circuit's refurbishment. Following the announcement, the track was announced to host rounds of the Stock Car Brasil, Stock Series, and F4 Brazil championships. The refurbishment process suffered from delays, and only began properly renovating the circuit and its facilities in 2025, along with slight changes in the track's design.

== Lap records ==
As of October 2026, the fastest official lap records at the Autódromo Internacional de Brasília are listed as:

Category	Time	Driver	Vehicle	Event
Full Circuit (2025–present): 5.380 km (3.343 mi)
Formula 4	1:54.903	Fabricio Fogaça	Tatuus F4-T421	2026 Brasília F4 Brasil round
Stock Car Pro	1:55.046	Guilherme Salas	Chevrolet Tracker	2026 Brasília Stock Car Pro round
Porsche Carrera Cup	1:55.362	Matheus Comparatto	Porsche 911 (992 I) GT3 Cup	2026 Brasília Porsche Cup Brasil Endurance round
Stock Light	2:01.347	Gabriel Koenigkan	Chevrolet Cruze JL-G12	2026 Brasília Stock Light round
Turismo Nacional BR	2:22.057	Luiz Veras	Chevrolet New Onix	2026 Brasília Turismo Nacional Brasil round
Full Circuit (1974–2014): 5.476 km (3.403 mi)
Formula Three	1:47.696	Clemente de Faria Jr.	Dallara F301	2007 Brasília F3 Sudamericana round
Formula One	1:51.620	Emerson Fittipaldi	McLaren M23	1974 Grande Premio Presidente Emilio Medici
GT1	1:52.620	Johnny Cecotto	McLaren F1 GTR	1997 Mil Milhas Brasil
Formula Renault 2.0	1:56.286	Anderson Faria	Tatuus FR2000	2005 Brasília Formula Renault 2.0 Brazil round
GT3	1:58.156	Xandy Negrão	Ford GT GT3	2008 Brasília GT3 Brasil round
Formula Future Fiat	2:05.126	Guilherme Silva	Signatech-Fiat Formula Futuro	2011 Brasília Formula Futuro Fiat round
Outer Circuit (1974–2014): 2.919 km (1.814 mi)
Formula Three	0:52.995	Pedro Piquet	Dallara F309	2014 Brasília F3 Brasil round
Stock Car Brasil	0:57.893	Popó Bueno	Peugeot 408 Stock Car	2013 2nd Brasília Stock Car Brasil round
Truck racing	1:11.963	Roberval Andrade	Scania Truck	2010 Brasília Fórmula Truck round

== Events ==
Current

- September: Stock Car Pro Series Stock Car Corrida Endurance, Stock Light, F4 Brazilian Championship, Turismo Nacional BR
- October: Porsche Cup Brasil, Império Endurance Brasil
- November: NASCAR Brasil Series, Copa Truck

Former

- Brasileiro de Marcas (2011–2014)
- Brazilian Formula Three Championship (2014)
- Formula 3 Sudamericana (1988, 1990–1993, 1995–2011, 2013)
- Formula Future Fiat (2010–2011)
- Formula One
  - Grande Prêmio Presidente Emilio Medici (1974, non-championship race)
- Fórmula Truck (2002–2014)
- GT3 Brasil (2008)
- Mil Milhas Brasil (1997)
