= 2013 FIA GT Nogaro round =

Layout of the Circuit Paul Armagnac

The 2013 FIA GT Nogaro, also known as 2013 Easter Cup (French: Coupes de Pâques 2013) was the first of six rounds in the 2013 FIA GT Series season. It took place at the Circuit Paul Armagnac in France between 30 March – 1 April 2013. The race was the first race under the newly renamed FIA GT Series after the FIA GT1 World Championship name was discontinued due to no GT1-spec cars competing.

The most notable entrants are nine-times World Rally Championship champion Sébastien Loeb racing with his own team and former professional football goalkeeper Fabien Barthez competing racing in the Gentleman Trophy with SOFREV Auto Sport Promotion. Also competing in the race is reigning FIA GT3 European Championship Teams champions HTP Gravity Charouz as well as one of the reigning Drivers' champions from 2012 Maximilian Bühk who will enter in the Pro Cup. His team mate last season Dominik Baumann also competes in the series for Grasser Racing in the Pro-Am Cup.

== Qualifying ==
=== Qualifying result ===
Qualifying took place on Saturday 30 March and determined the grid for the Qualifying Race the next day. Rather than the usual knockout qualifying sessions seen in the past series, there were two qualifying sessions for all twenty-four cars. The fastest ten times from the two combined sessions would go through to the Superpole session where they would compete for pole position. Seeing as the first session was partly wet, everybody set their fastest time in session two. As a result, the fastest ten drivers from session two went through to the Superpole session.

René Rast set the fastest time in the Superpole session for Belgian Audi Club Team WRT and would start in pole position for the Qualifying Race.

Pos.	No.	Driver 1	Team	Qualifying 1	Qualifying 2	Superpole	Grid
Pos.	No.	Driver 2	Team	Qualifying 1	Qualifying 2	Superpole	Grid
1	12	(Austria) Nikolaus Mayr-Melnhof	(Belgium) Belgian Audi Club Team WRT	1:35.718	1:27.107	1:26.091	1
1	12	(Germany) René Rast	(Belgium) Belgian Audi Club Team WRT	1:35.718	1:27.107	1:26.091	1
2	9	(France) Sébastien Loeb	(France) Sébastien Loeb Racing	1:29.359	1:26.840	1:26.210	2
2	9	(Portugal) Álvaro Parente	(France) Sébastien Loeb Racing	1:29.359	1:26.840	1:26.210	2
3	13	(Sweden) Edward Sandström	(Belgium) Belgian Audi Club Team WRT	1:30.780	1:27.000	1:26.528	3
3	13	(Germany) Frank Stippler	(Belgium) Belgian Audi Club Team WRT	1:30.780	1:27.000	1:26.528	3
4	11	(Monaco) Stéphane Ortelli	(Belgium) Belgian Audi Club Team WRT	1:30.530	1:26.670	1:26.779	4
4	11	(Belgium) Laurens Vanthoor	(Belgium) Belgian Audi Club Team WRT	1:30.530	1:26.670	1:26.779	4
5	14	(Portugal) César Campaniço	(Portugal) Team Novadriver	1:30.795	1:27.174	1:26.862	15
5	14	(Portugal) Carlos Vieira	(Portugal) Team Novadriver	1:30.795	1:27.174	1:26.862	15
6	0	(Brazil) Cacá Bueno	(Brazil) BMW Sport Trophy Team Brasil	1:30.247	1:27.601	1:27.110	5
6	0	(Brazil) Allam Khodair	(Brazil) BMW Sport Trophy Team Brasil	1:30.247	1:27.601	1:27.110	5
7	35	(United Kingdom) Alex Buncombe	(United Kingdom) Nissan GT Academy Team RJN	1:31.272	1:27.145	1:27.436	6
7	35	(Spain) Lucas Ordóñez	(United Kingdom) Nissan GT Academy Team RJN	1:31.272	1:27.145	1:27.436	6
8	5	(Belgium) Anthony Kumpen	(Germany) Phoenix Racing	1:31.138	1:27.774	1:27.474	7
8	5	(Belgium) Enzo Ide	(Germany) Phoenix Racing	1:31.138	1:27.774	1:27.474	7
9	10	(France) Mike Parisy	(France) Sébastien Loeb Racing	1:30.290	1:26.804	no time	8
9	10	(Austria) Andreas Zuber	(France) Sébastien Loeb Racing	1:30.290	1:26.804	no time	8
10	1	(Germany) Maximilian Buhk	(Germany) HTP Gravity Charouz	1:29.166	1:27.797	no time	9
10	1	(Israel) Alon Day	(Germany) HTP Gravity Charouz	1:29.166	1:27.797	no time	9
11	21	(Brazil) Sérgio Jimenez	(Brazil) BMW Sport Trophy Team Brasil	1:30.344	1:27.860		10
11	21	(Brazil) Ricardo Zonta	(Brazil) BMW Sport Trophy Team Brasil	1:30.344	1:27.860		10
12	28	(India) Karun Chandhok	(Germany) Seyffarth Motorsport	1:31.815	1:27.920		11
12	28	(Germany) Jan Seyffarth	(Germany) Seyffarth Motorsport	1:31.815	1:27.920		11
13	25	(Austria) Dominik Baumann	(Germany) Grasser Racing	1:32.278	1:28.147		12
13	25	(Austria) Harald Proczyk	(Germany) Grasser Racing	1:32.278	1:28.147		12
14	7	(Brazil) Cláudio Ricci	(Portugal) Rodrive Competições	1:29.976	1:28.334		13
14	7	(Brazil) Matheus Stumpf	(Portugal) Rodrive Competições	1:29.976	1:28.334		13
15	2	(Russia) Sergey Afanasyev	(Germany) HTP Gravity Charouz	1:29.359	1:28.397		14
15	2	(Sweden) Andreas Simonsen	(Germany) HTP Gravity Charouz	1:29.359	1:28.397		14
16	32	(Belgium) Wolfgang Reip	(United Kingdom) Nissan GT Academy Team RJN	1:31.794	1:29:050		16
16	32	(Russia) Mark Shulzhitskiy	(United Kingdom) Nissan GT Academy Team RJN	1:31.794	1:29:050		16
17	6	(France) Julien Jousse	(Spain) BMW Sports Trophy Team India	1:31.391	1:29.145		17
17	6	(India) Armaan Ebrahim	(Spain) BMW Sports Trophy Team India	1:31.391	1:29.145		17
18	31	(France) Fabien Barthez	(France) SOFREV Auto Sport Promotion	1:39.046	1:29.426		18
18	31	(France) Gérard Tonelli	(France) SOFREV Auto Sport Promotion	1:39.046	1:29.426		18
19	16	(Germany) Daniel Keilwitz	(Germany) Dörr Motorsport	1:29.990	1:29.463		19
19	16	(Germany) Niclas Kentenich	(Germany) Dörr Motorsport	1:29.990	1:29.463		19
20	30	(France) Soheil Ayari	(France) SOFREV Auto Sport Promotion	1:34.513	1:29.656		20
20	30	(France) Jean-Luc Beaubélique	(France) SOFREV Auto Sport Promotion	1:34.513	1:29.656		20
21	8	(Brazil) Raijan Mascarello	(Portugal) Rodrive Competições	1:38.768	1:31.522		21
21	8	(Brazil) Felipe Tozzo	(Portugal) Rodrive Competições	1:38.768	1:31.522		21
22	3	(Czech Republic) Petr Charouz	(Germany) HTP Gravity Charouz	1:41.527	1:39.063		22
22	3	(Czech Republic) Jan Stoviček	(Germany) HTP Gravity Charouz	1:41.527	1:39.063		22
DNS	51	(Italy) Fabio Onidi	(Italy) AF Corse	no time	no time		23
DNS	51	(Czech Republic) Filip Salaquarda	(Italy) AF Corse	no time	no time		23

== Race results ==
Class winners in bold.

=== Qualifying Race ===
Pos	Class	No.	Team	Drivers	Manufacturer	Laps	Time/Retired
1	**Pro**	**9**	**(France) Sébastien Loeb Racing**	**(France) Sébastien Loeb (Portugal) Álvaro Parente**	**McLaren**	**39**	
2	**Pro-Am**	**12**	**(Belgium) Belgian Audi Club Team WRT**	**(Austria) Nikolaus Mayr-Melnhof (Germany) René Rast**	**Audi**	**39**	**+5.323**
3	Pro	1	(Germany) HTP Gravity Charouz	(Germany) Maximilian Buhk (Israel) Alon Day	Mercedes-Benz	39	+5.511
4	Pro	5	(Germany) Phoenix Racing	(Belgium) Anthony Kumpen (Belgium) Enzo Ide	Audi	39	+25.257
5	Pro-Am	14	(Portugal) Team Novadriver	(Portugal) César Campaniço (Portugal) Carlos Vieira	Audi	39	+25.928
6	Pro	28	(Germany) Seyffarth Motorsport	(India) Karun Chandhok (Germany) Jan Seyffarth	Mercedes-Benz	39	+41.088
7	Pro	0	(Brazil) BMW Sport Trophy Team Brasil	(Brazil) Cacá Bueno (Brazil) Allam Khodair	BMW	39	+47.646
8	Pro	21	(Brazil) BMW Sport Trophy Team Brasil	(Brazil) Sérgio Jimenez (Brazil) Ricardo Zonta	BMW	39	+49.278
9	Pro	7	(Portugal) Rodrive Competições	(Brazil) Cláudio Ricci (Brazil) Matheus Stumpf	Ford	39	+58.852
10	Pro	10	(France) Sébastien Loeb Racing	(France) Mike Parisy (Austria) Andreas Zuber	McLaren	39	+59.938
11	Pro-Am	6	(Spain) BMW Sport Trophy Team India	(France) Julien Jousse (India) Armaan Ebrahim	BMW	39	+1:04.496
12	Pro-Am	25	(Germany) Grasser Racing	(Austria) Dominik Baumann (Austria) Harald Proczyk	Lamborghini	39	+1:07.981
13	Pro-Am	2	(Germany) HTP Gravity Charouz	(Russia) Sergey Afanasyev (Sweden) Andreas Simonsen	Mercedes-Benz	39	+1:09.067
14	Pro-Am	32	(United Kingdom) Nissan GT Academy Team RJN	(Belgium) Wolfgang Reip (Russia) Mark Shulzhitskiy	Nissan	39	+1:19.144
15	**Gent.**	**31**	**(France) SOFREV Auto Sport Promotion**	**(France) Fabien Barthez (France) Gérard Tonelli**	**Ferrari**	**38**	**+1 Lap**
16	Pro	11	(Belgium) Belgian Audi Club Team WRT	(Monaco) Stéphane Ortelli (Belgium) Laurens Vanthoor	Audi	38	+1 Lap
17	Gent.	8	(Portugal) Rodrive Competições	(Brazil) Raijan Mascarello (Brazil) Felipe Tozzo	Ford	37	+2 Laps
18	Gent.	3	(Germany) HTP Gravity Charouz	(Czech Republic) Petr Charouz (Czech Republic) Jan Stoviček	Mercedes-Benz	37	+2 Laps
19	Pro-Am	35	(United Kingdom) Nissan GT Academy Team RJN	(United Kingdom) Alex Buncombe (Spain) Lucas Ordóñez	Nissan	36	Mechanical
DNF	Pro	16	(Germany) Dörr Motorsport	(Germany) Daniel Keilwitz (Germany) Niclas Kentenich	McLaren	18	Mechanical
DNF	Pro	13	(Belgium) Belgian Audi Club Team WRT	(Sweden) Edward Sandström (Germany) Frank Stippler	Audi	17	Electrical
DNF	Pro-Am	30	(France) SOFREV Auto Sport Promotion	(France) Soheil Ayari (France) Jean-Luc Beaubélique	Ferrari	1	Mechanical
DNS	Pro-Am	51	(Italy) AF Corse	(Italy) Fabio Onidi (Czech Republic) Filip Salaquarda	Ferrari	–	Collision Damage

=== Championship Race ===
Pos	Class	No.	Team	Drivers	Manufacturer	Laps	Time/Retired
1	**Pro**	**13**	**(Belgium) Belgian Audi Club Team WRT**	**(Sweden) Edward Sandström (Germany) Frank Stippler**	**Audi**	**35**	
2	Pro	11	(Belgium) Belgian Audi Club Team WRT	(Monaco) Stéphane Ortelli (Belgium) Laurens Vanthoor	Audi	35	+8.041
3	Pro	1	(Germany) HTP Gravity Charouz	(Germany) Maximilian Buhk (Israel) Alon Day	Mercedes-Benz	35	+8.950
4	Pro	5	(Germany) Phoenix Racing	(Belgium) Anthony Kumpen (Belgium) Enzo Ide	Audi	35	+10.085
5	**Pro-Am**	**14**	**(Portugal) Team Novadriver**	**(Portugal) César Campaniço (Portugal) Carlos Vieira**	**Audi**	**35**	**+15.248**
6	Pro-Am	12	(Belgium) Belgian Audi Club Team WRT	(Austria) Nikolaus Mayr-Melnhof (Germany) René Rast	Audi	35	+18.050
7	Pro-Am	35	(United Kingdom) Nissan GT Academy Team RJN	(United Kingdom) Alex Buncombe (Spain) Lucas Ordóñez	Nissan	35	+18.637
8	Pro-Am	25	(Germany) Grasser Racing	(Austria) Dominik Baumann (Austria) Harald Proczyk	Lamborghini	35	+31.438
9	Pro	0	(Brazil) BMW Sport Trophy Team Brasil	(Brazil) Cacá Bueno (Brazil) Allam Khodair	BMW	35	+34.599
10	Pro	28	(Germany) Seyffarth Motorsport	(India) Karun Chandhok (Germany) Jan Seyffarth	Mercedes-Benz	35	+35.056
11	Pro	10	(France) Sébastien Loeb Racing	(France) Mike Parisy (Austria) Andreas Zuber	McLaren	35	+36.407
12	Pro	9	(France) Sébastien Loeb Racing	(France) Sébastien Loeb (Portugal) Álvaro Parente	McLaren	35	+41.035
13	Pro	21	(Brazil) BMW Sport Trophy Team Brasil	(Brazil) Sérgio Jimenez (Brazil) Ricardo Zonta	BMW	35	+53.581
14	Pro-Am	32	(United Kingdom) Nissan GT Academy Team RJN	(Belgium) Wolfgang Reip (Russia) Mark Shulzhitskiy	Nissan	35	+1:08.461
15	Pro-Am	7	(Portugal) Rodrive Competições	(Brazil) Cláudio Ricci (Brazil) Matheus Stumpf	Ford	35	+1:15.160
16	Pro-Am	2	(Germany) HTP Gravity Charouz	(Russia) Sergey Afanasyev (Sweden) Andreas Simonsen	Mercedes-Benz	35	+1:23.670
17	Pro	16	(Germany) Dörr Motorsport	(Germany) Daniel Keilwitz (Germany) Niclas Kentenich	McLaren	35	+1:24.393
18	Pro-Am	6	(Spain) BMW Sports Trophy Team India	(France) Julien Jousse (India) Armaan Ebrahim	BMW	34	+1 Lap
19	Pro-Am	30	(France) SOFREV Auto Sport Promotion	(France) Soheil Ayari (France) Jean-Luc Beaubélique	Ferrari	34	+1 Lap
20	**Gent.**	**31**	**(France) SOFREV Auto Sport Promotion**	**(France) Fabien Barthez (France) Gérard Tonelli**	**Ferrari**	**34**	**+1 Lap**
21	Gent.	3	(Germany) HTP Gravity Charouz	(Czech Republic) Petr Charouz (Czech Republic) Jan Stoviček	Mercedes-Benz	33	+2 Laps
22	Gent.	8	(Portugal) Rodrive Competições	(Brazil) Raijan Mascarello (Brazil) Felipe Tozzo	Ford	33	+2 Laps
DNS	Pro-Am	51	(Italy) AF Corse	(Italy) Fabio Onidi (Czech Republic) Filip Salaquarda	Ferrari	–	Collision Damage

FIA GT Series
Previous race: None	2013 season	Next race: Zolder
