= 2012 Campeonato Brasileiro de GT season =

2012 Campeonato Brasileiro de GT

Seasons
- ← 2011 2013 →

The 2012 Campeonato Brasileiro de GT season (Brazilian GT Championship) was the sixth season of Campeonato Brasileiro de GT, the first with this name. The season began on April 21 at Santa Cruz do Sul and ended on December 15 at the Interlagos after eight weekends totalling sixteen races.

Cleber Faria and Duda Rosa won the championship in GT3 class, Carlos Kray and Anderom Toso won in GT Premium, the GT4 championship was winner by Sergio Laganá and Alan Hellmeister.

== Class restructure ==
For the 2012 season, Campeonato Brasileiro de GT will contain three key classes. The GT3 class allows FIA homologated GT3 cars, such as the Ferrari 458 Italia. New to 2012 season is the introduction of the GT Premium class caters for older, such as the Dodge Viper Competition Coupe or Lamborghini Gallardo LP520. The pairs that have some driver with graduation A, no scored points in the class.

The GT4 class is a merger of Supersport-spec cars and GT4 homologated cars, such as the Ginetta G50 and cars currently used in the Maserati Trofeo and Ferrari Challenge series, based on the Maserati Coupé and Ferrari F430 road cars.

== Entries ==
For the 2012 season, the new BMW Team Brasil will line up in Brasileiro de GT with two GT3 cars developed by BMW Motorsport. Under the guidance of Team Principal Antonio Hermann, the AH Competições squad will also send two BMW Z4 GT3 cars into action in the series and two BMW M3 GT4 in GT4 class. BMW Team Brasil is supported by BMW Brazil.

GT3 class will be updated to include the Lamborghini Gallardo LP600+ and in the fifth round Audi R8 LMS ultra. GT4 class, Lotus Evora GT4 enters in the championship.

=== Entry list ===
All drivers were Brazilian-registered.

2012 Entry List
Team	No.	Drivers	Class	Chassis	Rounds
BMW Team Brasil	0	Cláudio Dahruj	GT3	BMW Z4 GT3	All
BMW Team Brasil	0	Cacá Bueno	GT3	BMW Z4 GT3	All
BMW Team Brasil	1	Constantino Júnior	GT3	BMW Z4 GT3	All
BMW Team Brasil	1	Valdeno Brito	GT3	BMW Z4 GT3	All
BMW Team Brasil	11	Patrick Gonçalves	GT4	BMW M3 GT4	All
BMW Team Brasil	11	Matheus Stumpf	GT4	BMW M3 GT4	All
BMW Team Brasil	12	Willian Starostik	GT4	BMW M3 GT4	1
BMW Team Brasil	12	Leonardo Cordeiro	GT4	BMW M3 GT4	All
BMW Team Brasil	12	Vitor Genz	GT4	BMW M3 GT4	2–8
CRT Competições	3	Rafael Derani	GT3	Ferrari 458 Italia GT3	All
CRT Competições	3	Cláudio Ricci	GT3	Ferrari 458 Italia GT3	All
CRT Competições	70	Walter Derani	GT3	Ferrari F430 GT3	3
CRT Competições	70	Antônio Pizzonia	GT3	Ferrari F430 GT3	3
CRT Competições	82	Marçal Melo	GT4	Ginetta G50	2
CRT Competições	82	João Gonçalves	GT4	Ginetta G50	2
Metasa	4	Felipe Roso	GTP	Ferrari F430 GT3	1, 4–5, 8
Metasa	4	Vinícius Roso	GTP	Ferrari F430 GT3	1, 4–5, 8
Dragão Lotus	6	Valter Pinheiro	GT4	Lotus Evora GT4	All
Dragão Lotus	6	Leonardo Burti	GT4	Lotus Evora GT4	All
Hot Car Competições	7	Popó Bueno	GT3	Ford GT GT3	4
Hot Car Competições	7	Marcelo Franco	GT3	Ford GT GT3	4
M2 Competições	8	Eduardo Oliveira	GT4	Ferrari Challenge	2–8
M2 Competições	8	William Freire	GT4	Ferrari Challenge	2–8
M2 Competições	57	Sergio Laganá	GT4	Aston Martin V8 Vantage GT4	All
M2 Competições	57	Alan Hellmeister	GT4	Aston Martin V8 Vantage GT4	All
Auto Racing	10	Cristiano de Almeida	GTP	Lamborghini Gallardo LP520 GT3	1–5
Auto Racing	10	Pierre Ventura	GTP	Lamborghini Gallardo LP520 GT3	1–5, 8
Auto Racing	10	Felipe Toledo	GTP	Lamborghini Gallardo LP520 GT3	8
Mottin Racing	15	Raijan Mascarello	GTP	Ferrari F430 GT3	1–8
Mottin Racing	15	Felipe Tozzo	GTP	Ferrari F430 GT3	1–8
Mottin Racing	18	Fernando Poeta	GT3	Lamborghini Gallardo LP560 GT3	1–4
Mottin Racing	18	Walter Derani	GT3	Lamborghini Gallardo LP560 GT3	1
Mottin Racing	18	Roger Sandoval	GT3	Lamborghini Gallardo LP560 GT3	2–3, 5
Mottin Racing	18	Fernando Fortes	GT3	Lamborghini Gallardo LP560 GT3	4
Mottin Racing	18	Alexandre Buneder	GT3	Lamborghini Gallardo LP560 GT3	5
Alfa Blau Team	16	Marcelo Hahn	GT3	Lamborghini Gallardo LP600+ GT3	1–7
Alfa Blau Team	16	Allam Khodair	GT3	Lamborghini Gallardo LP600+ GT3	1–7
Ebrahim Motors	17	Ramon Matias	GTP	Dodge Viper Competition Coupe	1–2
Ebrahim Motors	17	Renato Cattalini	GTP	Dodge Viper Competition Coupe	1
Ebrahim Motors	17	Lorenzo Varassin	GTP	Dodge Viper Competition Coupe	2–3
Ebrahim Motors	17	Paulo Varassin	GTP	Dodge Viper Competition Coupe	3
Ebrahim Motors	20	Fábio Ebrahim	GT3	Audi R8 LMS; Audi R8 LMS ultra	All
Ebrahim Motors	20	Wagner Ebrahim	GT3	Audi R8 LMS; Audi R8 LMS ultra	All
Greco Vivo	21	Valter Rossete	GT4	Maserati GranTurismo MC; Ferrari Challenge	1–4, 6–8
Greco Vivo	21	Fabio Greco	GT4	Maserati GranTurismo MC; Ferrari Challenge	1–4, 6–8
AMG Mattheis	22	Paulo Bonifácio	GT3	Mercedes-Benz SLS AMG GT3	2–8
AMG Mattheis	22	Sérgio Jimenez	GT3	Mercedes-Benz SLS AMG GT3	2–8
Seringal Racing Team	30	Duda Rosa	GT3	Mercedes-Benz SLS AMG GT3	All
Seringal Racing Team	30	Cleber Faria	GT3	Mercedes-Benz SLS AMG GT3	All
Seringal Racing Team	105	Vanuê Faria	GT3	Mercedes-Benz SLS AMG GT3	All
Seringal Racing Team	105	Renan Guerra	GT3	Mercedes-Benz SLS AMG GT3	All
Scuderia 111	33	Bruno Garfinkel	GT3	Lamborghini Gallardo LP600+ GT3	1
Scuderia 111	33	Rafael Daniel	GT3	Lamborghini Gallardo LP600+ GT3	1
Scuderia 111	63	Guilherme Figueiroa	GT3	Lamborghini Gallardo LP600+ GT3	3–4
Scuderia 111	63	Júlio Campos	GT3	Lamborghini Gallardo LP600+ GT3	3–4
Scuderia 111	75	Henrique Assunção	GT3	Lamborghini Gallardo LP560 GT3; Lamborghini Gallardo LP600 GT3	1, 4–5
Scuderia 111	75	Ronaldo Kastropil	GT3	Lamborghini Gallardo LP560 GT3; Lamborghini Gallardo LP600 GT3	1, 3–5
Scuderia 111	75	Bruno Garfinkel	GT3	Lamborghini Gallardo LP560 GT3; Lamborghini Gallardo LP600 GT3	3
Scuderia 111	99	Ricardo Ricca	GT4	Porsche 997 Cup GT4	3–4
Scuderia 111	99	Cássio Homem de Mello	GT4	Porsche 997 Cup GT4	3–4
Scuderia 111	175	Henrique Assunção	GTP	Dodge Viper Competition Coupe	2–3
Scuderia 111	175	Fúlvio Marote	GTP	Dodge Viper Competition Coupe	2
Scuderia 111	175	Fernando Fortes	GTP	Dodge Viper Competition Coupe	3
Kray Racing	46	Carlos Kray	GTP	Lamborghini Gallardo LP520 GT3	All
Kray Racing	46	Andersom Toso	GTP	Lamborghini Gallardo LP520 GT3	All
Gforce	61	Fernando Croce	GT3	Corvette Z06-R GT3	2–3, 6–7
Gforce	61	Fernando Gomes Croce	GT3	Corvette Z06-R GT3	2–3, 6, 8
Gforce	61	Daniel Croce	GT3	Corvette Z06-R GT3	7–8

Icon	Class
GT3	GT3 Class
GTP	GT Premium Class
GT4	GT4 Class

== Race calendar and results ==
All races were held in Brazil.

Round		Circuit	Date	GT3 Winner	GTP Winner	GT4 Winner
1	R1	Santa Cruz do Sul	April 21	No. 0 BMW Team Brasil	No. 15 Mottin Racing	No. 12 BMW Team Brasil
1	R1	Santa Cruz do Sul	April 21	Cláudio Dahruj Cacá Bueno	Raijan Mascarello Felipe Tozzo	Willian Starostik Leonardo Cordeiro
1	R2	Santa Cruz do Sul	April 22	No. 30 Seringal Racing Team	No. 17 Ebrahim Motors	No. 57 M2 Competições
1	R2	Santa Cruz do Sul	April 22	Duda Rosa Cleber Faria	Ramom Matias Renato Cattalini	Sergio Laganá Alan Hellmeister
2	R1	Curitiba	May 26	No. 30 BVA Racing Team	No. 15 Mottin Racing	No. 57 M2 Competições
2	R1	Curitiba	May 26	Duda Rosa Cleber Faria	Raijan Mascarello Felipe Tozzo	Sergio Laganá Allam Hellmeister
2	R2	Curitiba	May 27	No. 22 AMG Mattheis	No. 15 Mottin Racing	No. 6 Dragão Lotus
2	R2	Curitiba	May 27	Paulo Bonifacio Sérgio Jimenez	Raijan Mascarello Felipe Tozzo	Valter Pinheiro Leonardo Burti
3	R1	Interlagos	June 23	No. 16 Alfa Blau Team	No. 15 Mottin Racing	No. 12 BMW Team Brasil
3	R1	Interlagos	June 23	Marcelo Hahn Allam Khodair	Raijan Mascarello Felipe Tozzo	Vitor Genz Leonardo Cordeiro
3	R2	Interlagos	June 24	No. 16 Alfa Blau Team	No. 15 Mottin Racing	No. 6 Dragão Lotus
3	R2	Interlagos	June 24	Marcelo Hahn Allam Khodair	Raijan Mascarello Felipe Tozzo	Valter Pinheiro Leonardo Burti
4	R1	Jacarepaguá	July 21	No. 22 AMG Mattheis	No. 45 Kray Racing	No. 57 M2 Competições
4	R1	Jacarepaguá	July 21	Paulo Bonifacio Sérgio Jimenez	Carlos Kray Andersom Toso	Sergio Laganá Alan Hellmeister
4	R2	Jacarepaguá	July 22	No. 3 CRT Competições	No. 45 Kray Racing	No. 11 BMW Team Brasil
4	R2	Jacarepaguá	July 22	Rafael Derani Cláudio Ricci	Carlos Kray Andersom Toso	Patrick Gonçalves Matheus Stumpf
5	R1	Guaporé	September 1	No. 3 CRT Competições	No. 15 Mottin Racing	No. 6 Dragão Lotus
5	R1	Guaporé	September 1	Rafael Derani Cláudio Ricci	Raijan Mascarello Felipe Tozzo	Valter Pinheiro Leonardo Burti
5	R2	Guaporé	September 2	No. 105 Seringal Racing Team	No. 15 Mottin Racing	No. 11 BMW Team Brasil
5	R2	Guaporé	September 2	Vanuê Faria Renan Guerra	Raijan Mascarello Felipe Tozzo	Patrick Gonçalves Matheus Stumpf
6	R1	Campo Grande	November 17	No. 16 Alfa Blau Team	No. 15 Mottin Racing	No. 12 BMW Team Brasil
6	R1	Campo Grande	November 17	Marcelo Hahn Allam Khodair	Raijan Mascarello Felipe Tozzo	Vitor Genz Leonardo Cordeiro
6	R2	Campo Grande	November 18	No. 30 Seringal Racing Team	No. 45 Kray Racing	No. 8 M2 Competições
6	R2	Campo Grande	November 18	Duda Rosa Cleber Faria	Carlos Kray Andersom Toso	Eduardo Oliveira William Freire
7	R1	Cascavel	December 1	No. 0 BMW Team Brasil	No. 45 Kray Racing	No. 8 M2 Competições
7	R1	Cascavel	December 1	Cláudio Dahruj Cacá Bueno	Carlos Kray Andersom Toso	Eduardo Oliveira William Freire
7	R2	Cascavel	December 2	No. 22 AMG Mattheis	No. 15 Mottin Racing	No. 21 Greco Vivo
7	R2	Cascavel	December 2	Paulo Bonifacio Sérgio Jimenez	Raijan Mascarello Felipe Tozzo	Valter Rossete Fabio Greco
8	R1	Interlagos	December 15	No. 16 Alfa Blau Team	No. 15 Mottin Racing	No. 6 Dragão Lotus
8	R1	Interlagos	December 15	Marcelo Hahn Allam Khodair	Raijan Mascarello Felipe Tozzo	Valter Pinheiro Leonardo Burti
8	R2	Interlagos	December 16	No. 0 BMW Team Brasil	No. 45 Kray Racing	No. 12 BMW Team Brasil
8	R2	Interlagos	December 16	Cláudio Dahruj Cacá Bueno	Carlos Kray Andersom Toso	Vitor Genz Leonardo Cordeiro

== Championship standings ==
- Points were awarded as follows:

Pos	1	2	3	4	5	6	7	8	9	10	11	12	13	14	15
Race	20	17	15	13	11	10	9	8	7	6	5	4	3	2	1

=== GT3 ===
Pos	Driver	SCS		CUR		INT		RIO		GUA		CAM		CAS		INT		Pts
1	Duda Rosa	4	1	1	6	5	5	3	6	2	2	7	1	4	5	6	2	205
1	Cleber Faria	4	1	1	6	5	5	3	6	2	2	7	**1**	4	5	6	2	205
2	Cláudio Dahruj	1	3	2	2	4	4	5	DSQ	3	3	6	4	1	**4**	4	**1**	204
2	Cacá Bueno	1	3	**2**	2	4	4	5	DSQ	3	3	6	4	**1**	4	4	1	204
3	Paulo Bonifacio			DSQ	1	2	2	1	3	5	6	3	2	2	1	2	5	182
3	Sérgio Jimenez			DSQ	1	2	2	1	3	5	6	3	2	2	1	2	5	182
4	Rafael Derani	3	Ret	3	5	DNS	Ret	8	**1**	1	Ret	2	10	3	2	3	3	174
4	Cláudio Ricci	3	Ret	3	5	DNS	Ret	8	1	**1**	Ret	2	10	3	2	3	3	174
5	Marcelo Hahn	**5**	4	6	9	1	**1**	2	Ret	Ret	5	1	3	8	Ret	1	Ret	172
5	Allam Khodair	**5**	4	6	9	**1**	1	**2**	Ret	Ret	5	**1**	3	8	Ret	**1**	Ret	172
6	Vanuê Faria	16	5	4	4	6	3	4	8	6	1	10	5	Ret	3	18	6	158
6	Renan Guerra	16	5	4	4	6	3	4	8	6	1	10	5	Ret	3	18	6	158
7	Fábio Ebrahim	2	2	7	**10**	DNS	DNS	9	2	4	**8**	4	6	6	Ret	7	4	149
7	Wagner Ebrahim	2	2	7	10	DNS	DNS	9	2	4	8	4	6	6	Ret	7	4	149
8	Constantino Júnior	DNS	DNS	5	3	3	6	10	4	DSQ	4	5	7	5	DNS	5	Ret	125
8	Valdeno Brito	DNS	DNS	5	3	3	6	10	4	DSQ	4	5	7	5	DNS	5	Ret	125
9	Carlos Kray	9	8	11	11	11	12	11	9	9	11	10	9	9	8	11	7	90
9	Andersom Toso	9	8	11	11	11	12	11	9	9	11	10	9	9	8	11	7	90
10	Raijan Mascarello	7	Ret	9	7	9	11	Ret	18	7	10	8	Ret	13	7	9	7	84
10	Felipe Tozzo	7	Ret	9	7	9	11	Ret	18	7	10	8	Ret	13	7	9	Ret	84
11	Pierre Ventura	8	10	15	Ret	19	17	12	10	11	16					15	8	51
12	Fernando Croce			10	Ret	10	9					8	8	7	6			46
13	Ronaldo Kastropil	6	6			8	8	Ret	Ret	12	9							43
14	Fernando Gomes Croce			10	Ret	10	9					8	8			8	Ret	43
15	Cristiano de Almeida	8	10	15	Ret	19	17	12	10	11	16							39
16	Fernando Poeta	10	13	8	Ret	12	10	13	10									37
17	Henrique Assunção	6	6	DNS	DNS	20	Ret	Ret	Ret	12	9							29
18	Guilherme Figueiroa					7	7	6	7									28
18	Júlio Campos					7	7	6	7									28
19	Felipe Roso	17	9					14	12	10	Ret					10	9	28
19	Vinícius Roso	17	9					14	12	10	Ret					10	9	28
20	Roger Sandoval			8	Ret	12	10			8	7							27
21	Daniel Croce													7	6	8	Ret	27
22	Ramon Matias	18	7	Ret	8													20
23	Alexandre Bruneder									8	7							17
24	Bruno Garfinkel	DNS	DNS			8	8											16
25	Walter Derani	10	13			Ret	Ret											11
26	Marcelo Franco							7	5									11
26	Popó Bueno							7	5									11
27	Fernando Fortes					20	Ret	13	11									10
28	Renato Cattalini	18	7															9
29	Felipe Toledo															15	8	8
29	Lorenzo Varassin			Ret	8	DNS	DNS											8
	Antônio Pizzonia					Ret	Ret											0
	Rafael Daniel	DNS	DNS															0
	Fúlvio Marote			DNS	DNS													0
	Paulo Varassin					DNS	DNS											0
Pos	Driver	SCS		CUR		INT		RIO		GUA		CAM		CAS		INT		Pts

Colour	Result
Gold	Winner
Silver	Second place
Bronze	Third place
Green	Points classification
Blue	Non-points classification
Blue	Non-classified finish (NC)
Purple	Retired, not classified (Ret)
Red	Did not qualify (DNQ)
Red	Did not pre-qualify (DNPQ)
Black	Disqualified (DSQ)
White	Did not start (DNS)
White	Withdrew (WD)
White	Race cancelled (C)
Blank	Did not practice (DNP)
Blank	Did not arrive (DNA)
Blank	Excluded (EX)

**Bold** – Pole
Italics – Fastest Lap

=== GT Premium ===
Pos	Driver	SCS		CUR		INT		RIO		GUA		CAM		CAS		INT		Pts
1	Carlos Kray	9	**8**	11	11	11	12	11	9	9	11	11	9	9	**8**	11	7	251
1	Andersom Toso	9	8	11	11	11	12	11	9	9	11	11	9	9	8	9	7	251
2	Raijan Mascarello	7	Ret	9	**7**	9	**11**	Ret	**18**	7	**10**	9	**Ret**	13	7	9	Ret	230
2	Felipe Tozzo	7	Ret	**9**	7	**9**	11	**Ret**	18	**7**	10	**9**	Ret	**13**	7	**9**	Ret	230
3	Pierre Ventura	8	10	15	Ret	19	17	12	10	11	16					15	**8**	154
4	Cristiano de Almeida	8	10	15	Ret	19	17	12	10	11	16							124
5	Felipe Roso	17	9					14	12	10	Ret					10	9	92
5	Vinícius Roso	17	9					14	12	10	Ret					10	9	92
6	Ramon Matias	**18**	7	Ret	8													48
7	Renato Cattalini	18	7															20
8	Felipe Toledo															15	8	17
9	Lorenzo Varassin			Ret	8	DNS	DNS											17
10	Henrique Assunção			DNS	DNS	20	Ret											13
10	Fernando Fortes					20	Ret											13
	Fúlvio Marote			DNS	DNS													0
	Paulo Varassin					DNS	DNS											0
Pos	Driver	SCS		CUR		INT		RIO		GUA		CAM		CAS		INT		Pts

Colour	Result
Gold	Winner
Silver	Second place
Bronze	Third place
Green	Points classification
Blue	Non-points classification
Blue	Non-classified finish (NC)
Purple	Retired, not classified (Ret)
Red	Did not qualify (DNQ)
Red	Did not pre-qualify (DNPQ)
Black	Disqualified (DSQ)
White	Did not start (DNS)
White	Withdrew (WD)
White	Race cancelled (C)
Blank	Did not practice (DNP)
Blank	Did not arrive (DNA)
Blank	Excluded (EX)

**Bold** – Pole
Italics – Fastest Lap

=== GT4 ===
Pos	Driver	SCS		CUR		INT		RIO		GUA		CAM		CAS		INT		Pts
1	Sergio Laganá	15	11	12	14	15	14	12	17	15	17	17	16	14	10	16	13	210
1	Alan Hellmeister	**15**	11	**12**	14	**15**	14	**12**	17	**15**	17	**17**	16	**14**	10	16	13	210
2	Leonardo Cordeiro	11	14	DSQ	16	13	Ret	16	16	17	14	12	13	15	11	13	10	209
3	Valter Rossete	13	12	13	Ret	14	15	17	14			16	15	12	9	17	12	185
3	Fábio Greco	13	12	13	Ret	14	15	17	14			16	15	12	9	17	12	185
4	Eduardo Oliveira			14	13	21	16	18	15	14	13	14	11	10	Ret	19	15	182
4	William Freire			14	13	21	16	18	15	14	13	14	11	10	Ret	19	15	182
5	Valter Pinheiro	14	Ret	Ret	12	18	13	Ret	DSQ	13	15	13	12	11	13	12	14	178
5	Leonardo Burti	14	Ret	Ret	12	18	13	Ret	DSQ	13	15	13	12	11	13	**12**	14	178
6	Patrick Gonçalves	12	**DSQ**	Ret	**Ret**	16	18	19	11	16	12	15	14	16	12	14	**11**	176
6	Matheus Stumpf	12	**DSQ**	Ret	Ret	16	18	19	11	16	12	15	14	16	12	14	11	176
7	Vitor Genz			DSQ	16	13	**Ret**	16	**16**	17	**14**	12	**13**	15	**11**	13	10	174
8	Ricardo Ricca					17	DNS	Ret	19									21
8	Cássio Homem de Mello					17	DNS	Ret	19									21
9	Willian Starostik	11	14															20
10	Marçal Melo			Ret	15													13
10	João Gonçalves			Ret	15													13
Pos	Driver	SCS		CUR		INT		RIO		GUA		CAM		CAS		INT		Pts

Colour	Result
Gold	Winner
Silver	Second place
Bronze	Third place
Green	Points classification
Blue	Non-points classification
Blue	Non-classified finish (NC)
Purple	Retired, not classified (Ret)
Red	Did not qualify (DNQ)
Red	Did not pre-qualify (DNPQ)
Black	Disqualified (DSQ)
White	Did not start (DNS)
White	Withdrew (WD)
White	Race cancelled (C)
Blank	Did not practice (DNP)
Blank	Did not arrive (DNA)
Blank	Excluded (EX)

**Bold** – Pole
Italics – Fastest Lap
