= 2013 FIA GT Series =

1st season of sports car racing series

Seasons
- ← 2012 (FIA GT1); 2012 (FIA GT3) 2014 →

The 2013 FIA GT Series was the first season following on from the demise of the SRO Group's FIA GT1 World Championship, an auto racing series for grand tourer cars. The series underwent changes in 2013, retaining GT3 cars as the mainstay, but creating sub-classes for Pro, Pro-Am and Gentleman driver line-ups. All-Inkl.com Münnich Motorsport did not return to defend their Teams' World Champions, instead moving to the World Touring Car Championship with one of the Drivers' World Champions Marc Basseng beside René Münnich, team director of All-Inkl.com Münnich Motorsport, and defending 2012 WTCC champion Rob Huff.

== Calendar ==
The series commenced at the Circuit Paul Armagnac in France on 1 April and ended at Baku World Challenge in Azerbaijan on 24 November. The six-event calendar contained largely the same events as FIA GT1, with the addition of a race at Circuit Park Zandvoort in the Netherlands. The final round was originally scheduled to be held at a venue in the Middle East before organisers came to an agreement to hold the race on the streets of Baku in Azerbaijan instead.

Event	Circuit	Date
1	Circuit Paul Armagnac, Nogaro, France	1 April
2	Circuit Zolder, Heusden-Zolder, Belgium	21 April
3	Circuit Park Zandvoort, North Holland, Netherlands	7 July
4	Automotodróm Slovakia Ring, Orechová Potôň, Slovakia	18 August
5	Circuito de Navarra, Los Arcos, Spain	29 September
6	Baku World Challenge, Baku, Azerbaijan	24 November

== Entry list ==
The SRO released the entry list for Nogaro on 22 March.

Team	Car	Engine	No.	Drivers	Class	Events
(Brazil) BMW Sports Trophy Team Brasil	BMW Z4 GT3	BMW P65B44 4.4 L V8	0	(Brazil) Cacá Bueno	P	All
(Brazil) BMW Sports Trophy Team Brasil	BMW Z4 GT3	BMW P65B44 4.4 L V8	0	(Brazil) Allam Khodair	P	All
(Brazil) BMW Sports Trophy Team Brasil	BMW Z4 GT3	BMW P65B44 4.4 L V8	21	(Brazil) Sérgio Jimenez	P	All
(Brazil) BMW Sports Trophy Team Brasil	BMW Z4 GT3	BMW P65B44 4.4 L V8	21	(Brazil) Ricardo Zonta	P	1–4, 6
(Brazil) BMW Sports Trophy Team Brasil	BMW Z4 GT3	BMW P65B44 4.4 L V8	21	(Brazil) Átila Abreu	P	5
(Czech Republic) HTP Gravity Charouz	Mercedes-Benz SLS AMG GT3	Mercedes-Benz M159 6.2 L V8	1	(Germany) Maximilian Buhk	P	1–4, 6
(Czech Republic) HTP Gravity Charouz	Mercedes-Benz SLS AMG GT3	Mercedes-Benz M159 6.2 L V8	1	(Israel) Alon Day	P	All
(Czech Republic) HTP Gravity Charouz	Mercedes-Benz SLS AMG GT3	Mercedes-Benz M159 6.2 L V8	1	(Netherlands) Stef Dusseldorp	P	5
(Czech Republic) HTP Gravity Charouz	Mercedes-Benz SLS AMG GT3	Mercedes-Benz M159 6.2 L V8	2	(Russia) Sergey Afanasyev	PA	All
(Czech Republic) HTP Gravity Charouz	Mercedes-Benz SLS AMG GT3	Mercedes-Benz M159 6.2 L V8	2	(Sweden) Andreas Simonsen	PA	All
(Czech Republic) HTP Gravity Charouz	Mercedes-Benz SLS AMG GT3	Mercedes-Benz M159 6.2 L V8	3	(Czech Republic) Petr Charouz	G	1–4
(Czech Republic) HTP Gravity Charouz	Mercedes-Benz SLS AMG GT3	Mercedes-Benz M159 6.2 L V8	3	(Czech Republic) Jan Stoviček	G	1–4
(Czech Republic) HTP Gravity Charouz	Mercedes-Benz SLS AMG GT3	Mercedes-Benz M159 6.2 L V8	3	(Germany) Hubert Haupt	PA	5
(Czech Republic) HTP Gravity Charouz	Mercedes-Benz SLS AMG GT3	Mercedes-Benz M159 6.2 L V8	3	(Czech Republic) Martin Matzke	PA	5
(Czech Republic) HTP Gravity Charouz	Mercedes-Benz SLS AMG GT3	Mercedes-Benz M159 6.2 L V8	3	(Czech Republic) Petr Charouz	PA	6
(Czech Republic) HTP Gravity Charouz	Mercedes-Benz SLS AMG GT3	Mercedes-Benz M159 6.2 L V8	3	(Czech Republic) Jaroslav Janiš	PA	6
(Belgium) Marc VDS Racing Team	BMW Z4 GT3	BMW P65B44 4.4 L V8	4	(Netherlands) Nicky Catsburg	P	6
(Belgium) Marc VDS Racing Team	BMW Z4 GT3	BMW P65B44 4.4 L V8	4	(Belgium) Maxime Martin	P	6
(Germany) Phoenix Racing	Audi R8 LMS ultra	Audi CJJ 5.2 L V10	5	(Belgium) Anthony Kumpen	P	1–3
(Germany) Phoenix Racing	Audi R8 LMS ultra	Audi CJJ 5.2 L V10	5	(Belgium) Enzo Ide	P	1–3, 6
(Germany) Phoenix Racing	Audi R8 LMS ultra	Audi CJJ 5.2 L V10	5	(Germany) Markus Winkelhock	P	6
BMW Sports Trophy Team India	BMW Z4 GT3	BMW P65B44 4.4 L V8	6	(India) Armaan Ebrahim	PA	1–5
BMW Sports Trophy Team India	BMW Z4 GT3	BMW P65B44 4.4 L V8	6	(France) Julien Jousse	PA	1–2
BMW Sports Trophy Team India	BMW Z4 GT3	BMW P65B44 4.4 L V8	6	(Netherlands) Melroy Heemskerk	PA	3
BMW Sports Trophy Team India	BMW Z4 GT3	BMW P65B44 4.4 L V8	6	(Slovakia) Filip Sladecka	PA	4–5
(Portugal) Rodrive Competições	Ford GT GT3	Ford C54SDSM 5.3 L V8	7	(Brazil) Cláudio Ricci	PA	1–2
(Portugal) Rodrive Competições	Ford GT GT3	Ford C54SDSM 5.3 L V8	7	(Brazil) Matheus Stumpf	PA	1–2
(Portugal) Rodrive Competições	Lamborghini Gallardo GT3	Lamborghini CEH 5.2 L V10	7	(Brazil) Matheus Stumpf	PA	3–6
(Portugal) Rodrive Competições	Lamborghini Gallardo GT3	Lamborghini CEH 5.2 L V10	7	(Portugal) Patrick Cunha	PA	3–6
(Portugal) Rodrive Competições	Ford GT GT3	Ford C54SDSM 5.3 L V8	8	(Brazil) Raijan Mascarello	G	1–2
(Portugal) Rodrive Competições	Ford GT GT3	Ford C54SDSM 5.3 L V8	8	(Brazil) Felipe Tozzo	G	1–2
(France) Sébastien Loeb Racing	McLaren MP4-12C GT3	McLaren M838T 3.8 L twin turbo V8	9	(France) Sébastien Loeb	P	All
(France) Sébastien Loeb Racing	McLaren MP4-12C GT3	McLaren M838T 3.8 L twin turbo V8	9	(Portugal) Álvaro Parente	P	All
(France) Sébastien Loeb Racing	McLaren MP4-12C GT3	McLaren M838T 3.8 L twin turbo V8	10	(France) Mike Parisy	P	All
(France) Sébastien Loeb Racing	McLaren MP4-12C GT3	McLaren M838T 3.8 L twin turbo V8	10	(Austria) Andreas Zuber	P	All
(Belgium) Belgian Audi Club Team WRT	Audi R8 LMS ultra	Audi CJJ 5.2 L V10	11	(Monaco) Stéphane Ortelli	P	All
(Belgium) Belgian Audi Club Team WRT	Audi R8 LMS ultra	Audi CJJ 5.2 L V10	11	(Belgium) Laurens Vanthoor	P	All
(Belgium) Belgian Audi Club Team WRT	Audi R8 LMS ultra	Audi CJJ 5.2 L V10	12	(Austria) Nikolaus Mayr-Melnhof	P (Note: Mayr-Melnhof and Rast competed in Pro-Am Cup in the first round at Nogaro, Later Stéphane Ratel Organisation decided putting them in Pro Cup. Points and results of first round by Mayr-Melnhof and Rast was transferred for Pro class, but the points classification was maintained.)	All
(Belgium) Belgian Audi Club Team WRT	Audi R8 LMS ultra	Audi CJJ 5.2 L V10	12	(Germany) René Rast	P	1–4, 6
(Belgium) Belgian Audi Club Team WRT	Audi R8 LMS ultra	Audi CJJ 5.2 L V10	12	(United Kingdom) Oliver Jarvis	P	5
(Belgium) Belgian Audi Club Team WRT	Audi R8 LMS ultra	Audi CJJ 5.2 L V10	13	(Sweden) Edward Sandström	P	All
(Belgium) Belgian Audi Club Team WRT	Audi R8 LMS ultra	Audi CJJ 5.2 L V10	13	(Germany) Frank Stippler	P	All
(Belgium) Belgian Audi Club Team WRT	Audi R8 LMS ultra	Audi CJJ 5.2 L V10	18	(France) Grégoire Demoustier	P	6
(Belgium) Belgian Audi Club Team WRT	Audi R8 LMS ultra	Audi CJJ 5.2 L V10	18	(Portugal) Filipe Albuquerque	P	6
(Portugal) Team Novadriver	Audi R8 LMS ultra	Audi CJJ 5.2 L V10	14	(Portugal) César Campaniço	PA	All
(Portugal) Team Novadriver	Audi R8 LMS ultra	Audi CJJ 5.2 L V10	14	(Portugal) Carlos Vieira	PA	1–4
(Portugal) Team Novadriver	Audi R8 LMS ultra	Audi CJJ 5.2 L V10	14	(Germany) Michael Ammermüller	PA	5–6
(Belgium) Boutsen Ginion Racing	McLaren MP4-12C GT3	McLaren M838T 3.8 L twin turbo V8	15	(Netherlands) Stef Dusseldorp	P	6
(Belgium) Boutsen Ginion Racing	McLaren MP4-12C GT3	McLaren M838T 3.8 L twin turbo V8	15	(United Kingdom) Alexander Sims	P	6
(Belgium) Boutsen Ginion Racing	McLaren MP4-12C GT3	McLaren M838T 3.8 L twin turbo V8	22	(Belgium) Frederic Vervisch	P	6
(Belgium) Boutsen Ginion Racing	McLaren MP4-12C GT3	McLaren M838T 3.8 L twin turbo V8	22	(Belgium) Stoffel Vandoorne	P	6
(Germany) Dörr Motorsport	McLaren MP4-12C GT3	McLaren M838T 3.8 L twin turbo V8	16	(Germany) Daniel Keilwitz	P	1
(Germany) Dörr Motorsport	McLaren MP4-12C GT3	McLaren M838T 3.8 L twin turbo V8	16	(Germany) Niclas Kentenich	P	1
(Germany) Dörr Motorsport	McLaren MP4-12C GT3	McLaren M838T 3.8 L twin turbo V8	17	(Germany) Arne Hoffmeister	G	1
(Germany) Dörr Motorsport	McLaren MP4-12C GT3	McLaren M838T 3.8 L twin turbo V8	17	(Germany) Paul Green	G	1
(New Zealand) Von Ryan Racing	McLaren MP4-12C GT3	McLaren M838T 3.8 L twin turbo V8	19	(France) Grégoire Demoustier	PA	5
(New Zealand) Von Ryan Racing	McLaren MP4-12C GT3	McLaren M838T 3.8 L twin turbo V8	19	(United Kingdom) Duncan Tappy	PA	5
(Germany) Lamborghini Blancpain Reiter	Lamborghini Gallardo GT3	Lamborghini CEH 5.2 L V10	23	(Germany) Albert von Thurn und Taxis	P	4
(Germany) Lamborghini Blancpain Reiter	Lamborghini Gallardo GT3	Lamborghini CEH 5.2 L V10	23	(Germany) Marc Basseng	P	4–5
(Germany) Lamborghini Blancpain Reiter	Lamborghini Gallardo GT3	Lamborghini CEH 5.2 L V10	23	(Slovakia) Štefan Rosina	P	5
(Germany) Lamborghini Blancpain Reiter	Lamborghini Gallardo GT3	Lamborghini CEH 5.2 L V10	24	(Slovakia) Štefan Rosina	P	2, 4
(Germany) Lamborghini Blancpain Reiter	Lamborghini Gallardo GT3	Lamborghini CEH 5.2 L V10	24	(Netherlands) Peter Kox	P	2, 4
(Austria) GRT Grasser Racing Team	Lamborghini Gallardo GT3	Lamborghini CEH 5.2 L V10	25	(Austria) Dominik Baumann	PA	1–4, 6
(Austria) GRT Grasser Racing Team	Lamborghini Gallardo GT3	Lamborghini CEH 5.2 L V10	25	(Austria) Hari Proczyk	PA	All
(Austria) GRT Grasser Racing Team	Lamborghini Gallardo GT3	Lamborghini CEH 5.2 L V10	25	(Austria) Gerhard Tweraser	PA	5
(Austria) GRT Grasser Racing Team	Lamborghini Gallardo GT3	Lamborghini CEH 5.2 L V10	52	(Slovakia) Štefan Rosina	P	6
(Austria) GRT Grasser Racing Team	Lamborghini Gallardo GT3	Lamborghini CEH 5.2 L V10	52	(Slovakia) Filip Sladecka	P	6
(Germany) Vita4one Racing Team	BMW Z4 GT3	BMW P65B44 4.4 L V8	26	(India) Karun Chandhok	P	5
(Germany) Vita4one Racing Team	BMW Z4 GT3	BMW P65B44 4.4 L V8	26	(Netherlands) Yelmer Buurman	P	5
(France) Hexis Racing	McLaren MP4-12C GT3	McLaren M838T 3.8 L twin turbo V8	27	(United Kingdom) Rob Bell	P	6
(France) Hexis Racing	McLaren MP4-12C GT3	McLaren M838T 3.8 L twin turbo V8	27	(France) Kévin Estre	P	6
(Germany) Seyffarth Motorsport	Mercedes-Benz SLS AMG GT3	Mercedes-Benz M159 6.2 L V8	28	(India) Karun Chandhok	P	1–4
(Germany) Seyffarth Motorsport	Mercedes-Benz SLS AMG GT3	Mercedes-Benz M159 6.2 L V8	28	(Germany) Jan Seyffarth	P	1–4
(Germany) Seyffarth Motorsport	Mercedes-Benz SLS AMG GT3	Mercedes-Benz M159 6.2 L V8	29	(Brazil) Duda Rosa	G	2
(Germany) Seyffarth Motorsport	Mercedes-Benz SLS AMG GT3	Mercedes-Benz M159 6.2 L V8	29	(Brazil) Paolo Bonifacio	G	2
(Germany) Seyffarth Motorsport	Mercedes-Benz SLS AMG GT3	Mercedes-Benz M159 6.2 L V8	29	(Germany) Hubert Haupt	G	4
(Germany) Seyffarth Motorsport	Mercedes-Benz SLS AMG GT3	Mercedes-Benz M159 6.2 L V8	29	(Germany) Yenci Michael	G	4
(France) SOFREV Auto Sport Promotion	Ferrari 458 Italia GT3	Ferrari F136F 4.5 L V8	30	(France) Soheil Ayari	PA	1
(France) SOFREV Auto Sport Promotion	Ferrari 458 Italia GT3	Ferrari F136F 4.5 L V8	30	(France) Jean-Luc Beaubélique	PA	1
(France) SOFREV Auto Sport Promotion	Ferrari 458 Italia GT3	Ferrari F136F 4.5 L V8	31	(France) Fabien Barthez	G	1
(France) SOFREV Auto Sport Promotion	Ferrari 458 Italia GT3	Ferrari F136F 4.5 L V8	31	(France) Gérard Tonelli	G	1
(United Kingdom) Nissan GT Academy Team RJN	Nissan GT-R NISMO GT3	Nissan VR38DETT 3.8 L twin turbo V6	32	(Russia) Mark Shulzhitskiy	PA	1–3
(United Kingdom) Nissan GT Academy Team RJN	Nissan GT-R NISMO GT3	Nissan VR38DETT 3.8 L twin turbo V6	32	(United States) Steve Doherty	PA	5
(United Kingdom) Nissan GT Academy Team RJN	Nissan GT-R NISMO GT3	Nissan VR38DETT 3.8 L twin turbo V6	32	(Belgium) Wolfgang Reip	PA	1–3, 5
(United Kingdom) Nissan GT Academy Team RJN	Nissan GT-R NISMO GT3	Nissan VR38DETT 3.8 L twin turbo V6	35	(Belgium) Wolfgang Reip	PA	4
(United Kingdom) Nissan GT Academy Team RJN	Nissan GT-R NISMO GT3	Nissan VR38DETT 3.8 L twin turbo V6	35	(United Kingdom) Alex Buncombe	PA	1–5
(United Kingdom) Nissan GT Academy Team RJN	Nissan GT-R NISMO GT3	Nissan VR38DETT 3.8 L twin turbo V6	35	(Spain) Lucas Ordóñez	PA	1–3, 5
(Netherlands) V8 Racing	Chevrolet Corvette Z06-R GT3	Chevrolet LS7 7.0 L V8	40	(Netherlands) Duncan Huisman	PA	3
(Netherlands) V8 Racing	Chevrolet Corvette Z06-R GT3	Chevrolet LS7 7.0 L V8	40	(Netherlands) Max Braams	PA	3
(United Kingdom) Trackspeed	Porsche 997 GT3 R	Porsche M97/79 4.0 L F6	41	(Germany) Marco Holzer	P	6
(United Kingdom) Trackspeed	Porsche 997 GT3 R	Porsche M97/79 4.0 L F6	41	(United Kingdom) Nick Tandy	P	6
(United Kingdom) Trackspeed	Porsche 997 GT3 R	Porsche M97/79 4.0 L F6	42	(Austria) Martin Ragginger	P	6
(United Kingdom) Trackspeed	Porsche 997 GT3 R	Porsche M97/79 4.0 L F6	42	(United Kingdom) Danny Watts	P	6
(Germany) MRS GT Racing	McLaren MP4-12C GT3	McLaren M838T 3.8 L twin turbo V8	44	(United Kingdom) Oliver Turvey	P	6
(Germany) MRS GT Racing	McLaren MP4-12C GT3	McLaren M838T 3.8 L twin turbo V8	44	(Spain) Andy Soucek	P	6
(Germany) MRS GT Racing	McLaren MP4-12C GT3	McLaren M838T 3.8 L twin turbo V8	77	(Canada) Mark Thomas	G	6
(Germany) MRS GT Racing	McLaren MP4-12C GT3	McLaren M838T 3.8 L twin turbo V8	77	(Russia) Ilya Melnikov	G	6
(France) TDS Racing	BMW Z4 GT3	BMW P65B44 4.4 L V8	45	(France) Anthony Beltoise	PA	6
(France) TDS Racing	BMW Z4 GT3	BMW P65B44 4.4 L V8	45	(France) Henry Hassid	PA	6
(Italy) AF Corse	Ferrari 458 Italia GT3	Ferrari F136F 4.5 L V8	50	(Switzerland) Claudio Sdanewitsch	G	4–6
(Italy) AF Corse	Ferrari 458 Italia GT3	Ferrari F136F 4.5 L V8	50	(Italy) Michele Rugolo	G	4–5
(Italy) AF Corse	Ferrari 458 Italia GT3	Ferrari F136F 4.5 L V8	50	(Italy) Federico Leo	G	6
(Italy) AF Corse	Ferrari 458 Italia GT3	Ferrari F136F 4.5 L V8	51	(Italy) Fabio Onidi	PA	1–4
(Italy) AF Corse	Ferrari 458 Italia GT3	Ferrari F136F 4.5 L V8	51	(Czech Republic) Filip Salaquarda	PA	1–4
(United Kingdom) Fortec Motorsport	Mercedes-Benz SLS AMG GT3	Mercedes-Benz M159 6.2 L V8	62	(United Kingdom) Benji Hetherington	P	6
(United Kingdom) Fortec Motorsport	Mercedes-Benz SLS AMG GT3	Mercedes-Benz M159 6.2 L V8	62	(United Kingdom) Oliver Webb	P	6
(Germany) Callaway Competition	Chevrolet Corvette Z06-R GT3	Chevrolet LS7 7.0 L V8	102	(Germany) Daniel Keilwitz	P	6
(Germany) Callaway Competition	Chevrolet Corvette Z06-R GT3	Chevrolet LS7 7.0 L V8	102	(Netherlands) Jeroen Bleekemolen	P	6

Icon	Class
P	Pro
PA	Pro-Am
G	Gentlemen

== Race results ==
Event	Circuit	Pole position	Qualifying Race Winner	Championship Race Winner	Report
1	(France) Nogaro	(Belgium) No. 12 Belgian Audi Club Team WRT	(France) No. 9 Sébastien Loeb Racing	(Belgium) No. 13 Belgian Audi Club Team WRT	Report
1	(France) Nogaro	(Austria) Nikolaus Mayr-Melnhof (Germany) René Rast	(France) Sébastien Loeb (Portugal) Álvaro Parente	(Sweden) Edward Sandström (Germany) Frank Stippler	Report
2	(Belgium) Zolder	(Germany) No. 24 Lamborghini Blancpain Reiter	(Belgium) No. 11 Belgian Audi Club Team WRT	(Germany) No. 24 Lamborghini Blancpain Reiter	Report
2	(Belgium) Zolder	(Netherlands) Peter Kox (Slovakia) Štefan Rosina	(Monaco) Stéphane Ortelli (Belgium) Laurens Vanthoor	(Netherlands) Peter Kox (Slovakia) Štefan Rosina	Report
3	(Netherlands) Zandvoort	(France) No. 9 Sébastien Loeb Racing	(Belgium) No. 11 Belgian Audi Club Team WRT	(Czech Republic) No. 1 HTP Gravity Charouz	Report
3	(Netherlands) Zandvoort	(France) Sébastien Loeb (Portugal) Álvaro Parente	(Monaco) Stéphane Ortelli (Belgium) Laurens Vanthoor	(Germany) Maximilian Buhk (Israel) Alon Day	Report
4	Slovakia Ring	(Belgium) No. 12 Belgian Audi Club Team WRT	(France) No. 9 Sébastien Loeb Racing	(Czech Republic) No. 2 HTP Gravity Charouz	Report
4	Slovakia Ring	(Austria) Nikolaus Mayr-Melnhof (Germany) René Rast	(France) Sébastien Loeb (Portugal) Álvaro Parente	(Russia) Sergey Afanasyev (Sweden) Andreas Simonsen	Report
5	(Spain) Navarra	(Germany) No. 23 Lamborghini Blancpain Reiter	(France) No. 9 Sébastien Loeb Racing	(France) No. 9 Sébastien Loeb Racing	Report
5	(Spain) Navarra	(Germany) Marc Basseng (Slovakia) Štefan Rosina	(France) Sébastien Loeb (Portugal) Álvaro Parente	(France) Sébastien Loeb (Portugal) Álvaro Parente	Report
6	(Azerbaijan) Baku	(Belgium) No. 12 Belgian Audi Club Team WRT	(Belgium) No. 12 Belgian Audi Club Team WRT	(Belgium) No. 11 Belgian Audi Club Team WRT	Report
6	(Azerbaijan) Baku	(Austria) Nikolaus Mayr-Melnhof (Germany) René Rast	(Austria) Nikolaus Mayr-Melnhof (Germany) René Rast	(Monaco) Stéphane Ortelli (Belgium) Laurens Vanthoor	Report

== Championship standings ==
Scoring system

Championship points were awarded for the first six positions in each Qualifying Race and for the first ten positions in each Championship Race. The pole-sitter in the qualifying race also received one point, entries were required to complete 75% of the winning car's race distance in order to be classified and earn points. Individual drivers were required to participate for a minimum of 25 minutes in order to earn championship points in any race.

Qualifying race points

Position	**1st**	**2nd**	**3rd**	**4th**	**5th**	**6th**	**Pole**	Ref
Points	8	6	4	3	2	1	1	

Championship race points

Position	**1st**	**2nd**	**3rd**	**4th**	**5th**	**6th**	**7th**	**8th**	**9th**	**10th**	Ref
Points	25	18	15	12	10	8	6	4	2	1	

=== Drivers' Championship ===
==== Pro Cup ====
Pos.	Driver	Team	NOG (France)		ZOL (Belgium)		ZAN (Netherlands)		SVK (Slovakia)		NAV (Spain)		BAK (Azerbaijan)		Total
Pos.	Driver	Team	QR	CR	QR	CR	QR	CR	QR	CR	QR	CR	QR	CR	Total
1	(Monaco) Stéphane Ortelli (Belgium) Laurens Vanthoor	(Belgium) Belgian Audi Club Team WRT	16	2	1	**2**	1	**2**	2	3	7	15	2	1	132
2	(Germany) Frank Stippler (Sweden) Edward Sandström	(Belgium) Belgian Audi Club Team WRT	Ret	1	5	3	4	3	9	4	2	3	7	11	110
3	(Austria) Nikolaus Mayr-Melnhof	(Belgium) Belgian Audi Club Team WRT	**2**	6	3	5	3	Ret	**5**	2	18	5	**1**	**15**	92
4	(France) Sébastien Loeb (Portugal) Álvaro Parente	(France) Sébastien Loeb Racing	1	**12**	17	13	**Ret**	14	1	**Ret**	1	**1**	14	2	82
5	(Israel) Alon Day	(Czech Republic) HTP Gravity Charouz	3	3	7	Ret	2	1	10	Ret	Ret	7	12	4	80
6	(Germany) René Rast	(Belgium) Belgian Audi Club Team WRT	**2**	6	3	5	3	Ret	**5**	2			**1**	**15**	80
7	(Germany) Maximilian Buhk	(Czech Republic) HTP Gravity Charouz	3	3	7	Ret	2	1	10	Ret			12	4	70
8	(France) Mike Parisy (Austria) Andreas Zuber	(France) Sébastien Loeb Racing	10	11	4	4	6	15	4	7	5	2	Ret	Ret	61
9	(Slovakia) Štefan Rosina	(Germany) Lamborghini Blancpain Reiter			**2**	1			3	Ret	**15**	17			51
9	(Slovakia) Štefan Rosina	(Austria) GRT Grasser Racing Team											21	6	51
10	(Brazil) Cacá Bueno (Brazil) Allam Khodair	(Brazil) BMW Sports Trophy Team Brasil	7	9	11	8	5	7	7	DNS	10	12	8	Ret	40
11	(Brazil) Sérgio Jimenez	(Brazil) BMW Sports Trophy Team Brasil	8	13	19	11	16	6	8	5	17	8	16	Ret	37
12	(Netherlands) Peter Kox	(Germany) Lamborghini Blancpain Reiter			**2**	1			3	Ret					36
13	(India) Karun Chandhok	(Germany) Seyffarth Motorsport	6	10	10	DNS	8	4	Ret	10	12	Ret			32
14	(Germany) Jan Seyffarth	(Germany) Seyffarth Motorsport	6	10	10	DNS	8	4	Ret	10					31
15	(Brazil) Ricardo Zonta	(Brazil) BMW Sports Trophy Team Brasil	8	13	19	11	16	6	8	5			16	Ret	29
16	(Belgium) Anthony Kumpen	(Germany) Phoenix Racing	4	4	8	6	12	Ret							24
16	(Belgium) Enzo Ide	(Germany) Phoenix Racing	4	4	8	6	12	Ret					9	12	24
17	(United Kingdom) Oliver Jarvis	(Belgium) Belgian Audi Club Team WRT									18	5			12
18	(Netherlands) Stef Dusseldorp	(Czech Republic) HTP Gravity Charouz									Ret	7			10
18	(Netherlands) Stef Dusseldorp	(Belgium) Boutsen Ginion Racing											4^{1}	8^{1}	10
19	(Brazil) Átila Abreu	(Brazil) BMW Sports Trophy Team Brasil									17	8			8
20	(Germany) Marc Basseng	(Germany) Lamborghini Blancpain Reiter							11	15	**15**	17			3
21	(Germany) Daniel Keilwitz (Germany) Niclas Kentenich	(Germany) Dörr Motorsport	Ret	17											1
22	(Netherlands) Yelmer Buurman	(Germany) Seyffarth Motorsport									12	Ret			1
—	(Germany) Albert von Thurn und Taxis	(Germany) Lamborghini Blancpain Reiter							11	15					0
Guest drivers ineligible for points
—	(United Kingdom) Rob Bell (France) Kévin Estre	(France) Hexis Racing											3	3	
—	(United Kingdom) Alexander Sims	(Belgium) Boutsen Ginion Racing											4	8	
—	(Netherlands) Nick Catsburg (Belgium) Maxime Martin	(Belgium) Marc VDS Racing Team											5	Ret	
—	(Germany) Markus Winkelhock	(Germany) Phoenix Racing											9	12	
—	(Germany) Marco Holzer (United Kingdom) Nick Tandy	(United Kingdom) Trackspeed											10	Ret	
—	(Belgium) Stoffel Vandoorne (Belgium) Frederic Vervisch	(Belgium) Boutsen Ginion Racing											11	Ret	
—	(United Kingdom) Benji Hetherington (United Kingdom) Oliver Webb	(United Kingdom) Fortec Motorsport											15	Ret	
—	(Portugal) Filipe Albuquerque (France) Grégoire Demoustier	(Belgium) Belgian Audi Club Team WRT											17	Ret	
—	(Slovakia) Filip Sladecka	(Austria) GRT Grasser Racing Team											21	6	
—	(Austria) Martin Ragginger (United Kingdom) Danny Watts	(United Kingdom) Trackspeed											Ret	DNS	
—	(Spain) Andy Soucek (United Kingdom) Oliver Turvey	(Germany) MRS GT Racing											Ret	9	

Key
Colour	Result
Gold	Race winner
Silver	2nd place
Bronze	3rd place
Green	Points finish
Blue	Non-points finish
Blue	Non-classified finish (NC)
Purple	Did not finish (Ret)
Black	Disqualified (DSQ)
Black	Excluded (EX)
White	Did not start (DNS)
White	Race cancelled (C)
White	Withdrew (WD)
Blank	Did not participate

**Bold** – Pole

Notes

- ^{1} – Stef Dusseldorp was ineligible for Pro Cup points in Baku.

==== Pro-Am Cup ====
Pos.	Driver	Team	NOG (France)		ZOL (Belgium)		ZAN (Netherlands)		SVK (Slovakia)		NAV (Spain)		BAK (Azerbaijan)		Total
Pos.	Driver	Team	QR	CR	QR	CR	QR	CR	QR	CR	QR	CR	QR	CR	Total
1	(Russia) Sergey Afanasyev (Sweden) Andreas Simonsen	(Czech Republic) HTP Gravity Charouz	12	16	**6**	7	**7**	12	**6**	1	4	4	**6**	Ret	136
2	(Austria) Hari Proczyk	(Germany) Grasser Racing	11	8	12	10	10	5	14	6	3	10	Ret	5	133
3	(Austria) Dominik Baumann	(Germany) Grasser Racing	11	8	12	10	10	5	14	6			Ret	5	113
4	(Portugal) César Campaniço	(Portugal) Team Novadriver	**5**	5	13	9	11	Ret	17	Ret	**6**	9	Ret	7	97
5	(Belgium) Wolfgang Reip	(United Kingdom) Nissan GT Academy Team RJN	13	14	15	14	Ret	11	12	8	11	6			76
6	(Brazil) Matheus Stumpf	(Portugal) Rodrive Competições	9	15	14	Ret	14	10	15	12	9	16	13	14	73
7	(United Kingdom) Alex Buncombe	(United Kingdom) Nissan GT Academy Team RJN	19	7	18	Ret	13	8	12	8	13	11			70
8	(Portugal) Carlos Vieira	(Portugal) Team Novadriver	**5**	5	13	9	11	Ret	17	Ret					59
9	(Portugal) Patrick Cunha	(Portugal) Rodrive Competições					14	10	15	12	9	16	13	14	55
10	(Spain) Lucas Ordóñez	(United Kingdom) Nissan GT Academy Team RJN	19	7	18	Ret	13	8			13	11			49
11	(Germany) Michael Ammermüller	(Portugal) Team Novadriver									**6**	9	Ret	7	38
12	(Russia) Mark Shulzhitskiy	(United Kingdom) Nissan GT Academy Team RJN	13	14	15	14	Ret	11							35
13	(Italy) Fabio Onidi (Czech Republic) Filip Salaquarda	(Italy) AF Corse	DNS	DNS	9	12	Ret	Ret	13	9					34
14	(India) Armaan Ebrahim	BMW Sports Trophy Team India	14	18	DNS	DNS	9	9	Ret	DNS	Ret	DNS			28
15	(Netherlands) Melroy Heemskerk	BMW Sports Trophy Team India					9	9							21
16	(United States) Steve Doherty	(United Kingdom) Nissan GT Academy Team RJN									11	6			20
16	(Austria) Gerhard Tweraser	(Austria) GRT Grasser Racing Team									3	10			20
17	(Brazil) Cláudio Ricci	(Portugal) Rodrive Competições	9	15	14	Ret									18
18	(Germany) Hubert Haupt (Czech Republic) Martin Matzke	(Czech Republic) HTP Gravity Charouz									16	13			8
19	(France) Julien Jousse	BMW Sports Trophy Team India	14	18	DNS	DNS									7
20	(France) Soheil Ayari (France) Jean-Luc Beaubélique	(France) SOFREV Auto Sport Promotion	Ret	19											4
—	(Netherlands) Max Braams (Netherlands) Duncan Huisman	(Netherlands) V8 Racing					Ret	Ret							0
—	(Slovakia) Filip Sladecka	BMW Sports Trophy Team India							Ret	DNS	Ret	DNS			0
Guest drivers ineligible for points
—	(France) Grégoire Demoustier (United Kingdom) Duncan Tappy	(New Zealand) Von Ryan Racing									14	Ret			
—	(France) Anthony Beltoise (France) Henry Hassid	(France) TDS Racing											20	10	
—	(Czech Republic) Petr Charouz (Czech Republic) Jaroslav Janiš	(Czech Republic) HTP Gravity Charouz											Ret	Ret	

Key
Colour	Result
Gold	Race winner
Silver	2nd place
Bronze	3rd place
Green	Points finish
Blue	Non-points finish
Blue	Non-classified finish (NC)
Purple	Did not finish (Ret)
Black	Disqualified (DSQ)
Black	Excluded (EX)
White	Did not start (DNS)
White	Race cancelled (C)
White	Withdrew (WD)
Blank	Did not participate

**Bold** – Pole

==== Gentlemen's Trophy ====
Pos.	Driver	Team	NOG (France)		ZOL (Belgium)		ZAN (Netherlands)		SVK (Slovakia)		NAV (Spain)		BAK (Azerbaijan)		Total
Pos.	Driver	Team	QR	CR	QR	CR	QR	CR	QR	CR	QR	CR	QR	CR	Total
1	(Czech Republic) Petr Charouz (Czech Republic) Jan Stoviček	(Czech Republic) HTP Gravity Charouz	18	21	16	**15**	**15**	**13**	18	14					110
2	(Switzerland) Claudio Sdanewitsch	(Italy) AF Corse							**16**	**11**	**8**	**14**	**18**	**13**	102
3	(Italy) Michele Rugolo	(Italy) AF Corse							**16**	**11**	**8**	**14**			68
4	(France) Fabien Barthez (France) Gérard Tonelli	(France) SOFREV Auto Sport Promotion	**15**	**20**											34
5	(Brazil) Raijan Mascarello (Brazil) Felipe Tozzo	(Portugal) Rodrive Competições	17	22	DNS	Ret									21
6	(Brazil) Duda Rosa (Brazil) Paolo Bonifacio	(Germany) Seyffarth Motorsport			**Ret**	16									19
7	(Germany) Hubert Haupt (Germany) Yenci Michael	(Germany) Seyffarth Motorsport							Ret	13					18
—	(Germany) Paul Green (Germany) Arne Hoffmeister	(Germany) Dörr Motorsport	WD	WD											0
Guest drivers ineligible for points
—	(Italy) Federico Leo	(Italy) AF Corse											**18**	**13**	
—	(Canada) Mark Thomas (Russia) Ilya Melnikov	(Germany) MRS GT Racing											19	16	

Key
Colour	Result
Gold	Race winner
Silver	2nd place
Bronze	3rd place
Green	Points finish
Blue	Non-points finish
Blue	Non-classified finish (NC)
Purple	Did not finish (Ret)
Black	Disqualified (DSQ)
Black	Excluded (EX)
White	Did not start (DNS)
White	Race cancelled (C)
White	Withdrew (WD)
Blank	Did not participate

**Bold** – Pole

=== Teams' Championship ===
==== Pro Cup ====
Pos.	Team	Manufacturer	NOG (France)		ZOL (Belgium)		ZAN (Netherlands)		SVK (Slovakia)		NAV (Spain)		BAK (Azerbaijan)		Total
Pos.	Team	Manufacturer	QR	CR	QR	CR	QR	CR	QR	CR	QR	CR	QR	CR	Total
1	(Belgium) Belgian Audi Club Team WRT	Audi	16	1	**1**	2	1	2	**2**	2	**2**	3	**1**	1	**179**
2	(France) Sébastien Loeb Racing	McLaren	**1**	11	4	4	**6**	14	1	7	1	1	14	2	**137**
3	(Brazil) BMW Sports Trophy Team Brasil	BMW	7	9	11	8	5	6	7	5	10	8	8	Ret	**100**
4	(Czech Republic) HTP Gravity Charouz	Mercedes-Benz	3	3	7	Ret	2	1	10	Ret	Ret	7	12	4	**96**

Key
Colour	Result
Gold	Race winner
Silver	2nd place
Bronze	3rd place
Green	Points finish
Blue	Non-points finish
Blue	Non-classified finish (NC)
Purple	Did not finish (Ret)
Black	Disqualified (DSQ)
Black	Excluded (EX)
White	Did not start (DNS)
White	Race cancelled (C)
White	Withdrew (WD)
Blank	Did not participate

==== Pro-Am Cup ====
Pos.	Team	Manufacturer	NOG (France)		ZOL (Belgium)		ZAN (Netherlands)		SVK (Slovakia)		NAV (Spain)		BAK (Azerbaijan)		Total
Pos.	Team	Manufacturer	QR	CR	QR	CR	QR	CR	QR	CR	QR	CR	QR	CR	Total
1	(Czech Republic) HTP Gravity Charouz	Mercedes-Benz	12	16	**6**	7	**7**	12	**6**	1	4	4	**6**	Ret	**155**
2	(United Kingdom) Nissan GT Academy Team RJN	Nissan	**13**	7	15	14	13	8	12	8	**11**	6			**130**
3	(Portugal) Rodrive Competições	Ford	9	15	14	Ret	14	10	15	12	9	16	13	14	**125**

Key
Colour	Result
Gold	Race winner
Silver	2nd place
Bronze	3rd place
Green	Points finish
Blue	Non-points finish
Blue	Non-classified finish (NC)
Purple	Did not finish (Ret)
Black	Disqualified (DSQ)
Black	Excluded (EX)
White	Did not start (DNS)
White	Race cancelled (C)
White	Withdrew (WD)
Blank	Did not participate

==== Gentlemen's Trophy ====
Pos.	Team	Manufacturer	NOG (France)		ZOL (Belgium)		ZAN (Netherlands)		SVK (Slovakia)		NAV (Spain)		BAK (Azerbaijan)		Total
Pos.	Team	Manufacturer	QR	CR	QR	CR	QR	CR	QR	CR	QR	CR	QR	CR	Total
1	(Czech Republic) HTP Gravity Charouz	Mercedes-Benz	18	21	16	15	**15**	13	**18**	14					**132**
2	(Portugal) Rodrive Competiçoes	Ford	**17**	22	**DNS**	Ret									**28**

Key
Colour	Result
Gold	Race winner
Silver	2nd place
Bronze	3rd place
Green	Points finish
Blue	Non-points finish
Blue	Non-classified finish (NC)
Purple	Did not finish (Ret)
Black	Disqualified (DSQ)
Black	Excluded (EX)
White	Did not start (DNS)
White	Race cancelled (C)
White	Withdrew (WD)
Blank	Did not participate

== See also ==
- 2013 Blancpain Endurance Series season
