= Sérgio Jimenez =

Brazilian racecar driver (born 1984)

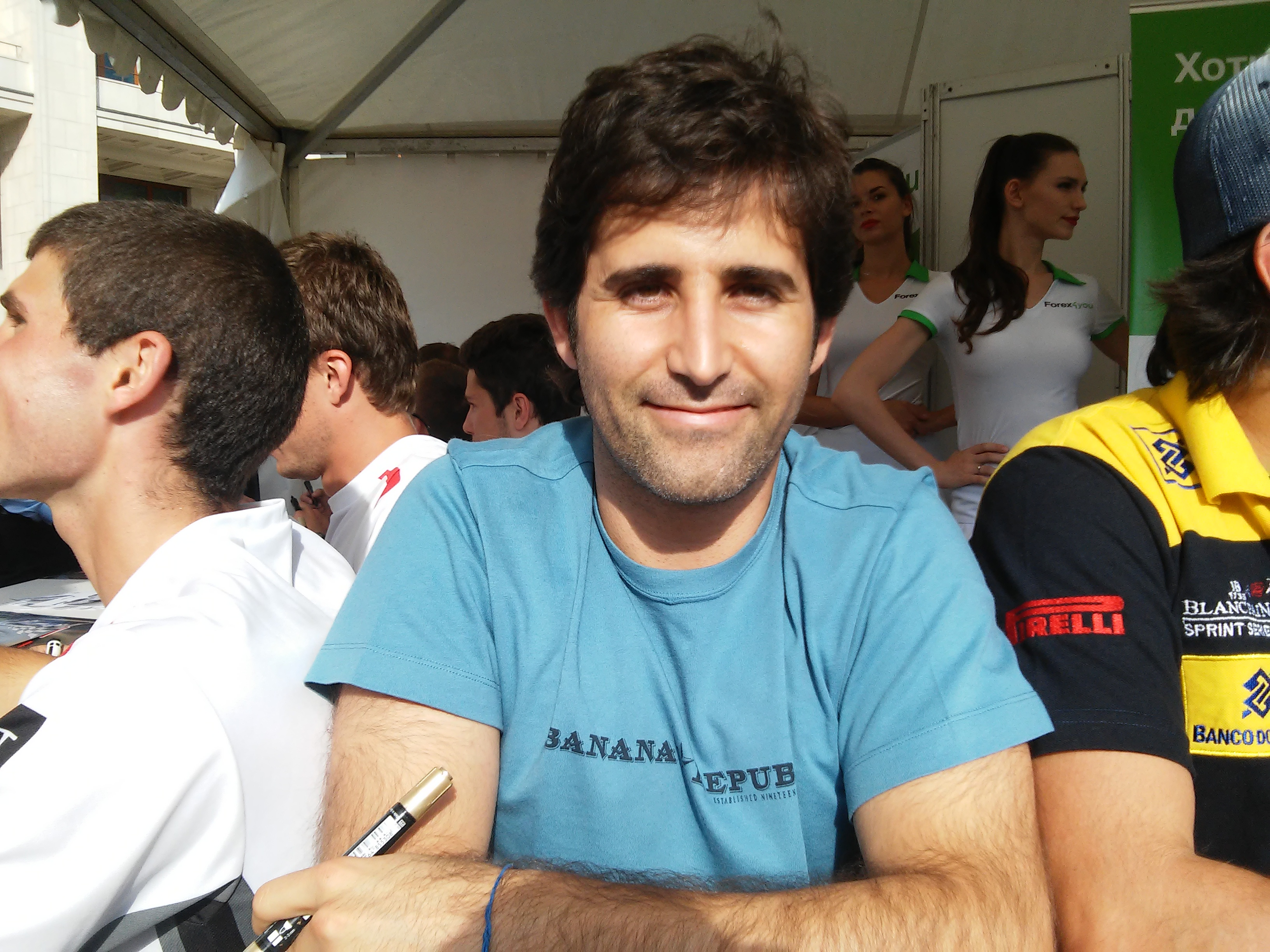
- Jimenez in 2015.
- Nationality: (Brazil) Brazilian
- Born: May 15, 1984 (age 42) Piedade, São Paulo

Stock Car Pro Series career
- Debut season: 2011
- Current team: Scuderia Chiarelli
- Categorisation: FIA Gold
- Car number: 73

Previous series
- 2018–19 2010 2007–08 2007 2006 2003 2002: Jaguar I-Pace eTrophy; FIA GT1 World Championship; A1 Grand Prix; GP2 Series; Spanish Formula 3 Formula Renault 2.0 UK; Formula Renault 2.0 Brazil

Championship titles
- 2018–19 2002: Jaguar I-Pace eTrophy; Formula Renault 2.0 Brazil

Sérgio Jimenez (born May 15, 1984, in Piedade, São Paulo State) is a Brazilian racing driver currently competing with Scuderia Chiarelli in the Stock Car Pro Series. He is the 2002 Formula Renault 2.0 Brazil champion, and the 2018-19 Jaguar I-Pace eTrophy champion.

== Career ==
Jimenez started his career in 1994 with karting and in 2002 participated in the Formula Renault Brazilian Championship, which he won. In 2006, he participated in the Spanish Formula Three Championship. Jimenez drove five races for Racing Engineering in the 2007 GP2 Series season before being dropped in favor of Ernesto Viso after the 2007 Monaco Grand Prix. He drove also for A1 Team Brazil in the 2007-08 A1 Grand Prix season.

== Racing record ==
=== Career summary ===
Season	Series	Team	Races	Wins	Poles	F.Laps	Podiums	Points	Position
2002	Formula Renault 2.0 Brazil	Bassani Racing	10	0	2	1	7	144	**1st**
2003	Formula Renault 2.0 UK	Manor Motorsport	14	0	0	0	0	150	11th
2006	Spanish Formula Three Championship	Racing Engineering	16	1	1	1	5	75	5th
2007	GP2 Series	Racing Engineering	5	0	0	0	0	4	24th
2007–08	A1 Grand Prix	A1 Team Brazil	12	0	0	0	1	44	14th
2009	Copa Vicar	Scuderia 111	5	1	1	1	1	43	10th
2010	Copa Chevrolet Montana	Scuderia 111	8	1	2	0	1	73	6th
2010	FIA GT1 World Championship	Mad-Croc Racing; Reiter Engineering	4	0	0	0	0	12	34th
2011	Stock Car Brasil	Crystal Racing; Team Scuderia 111	3	0	0	0	0	0	32nd
2011	FIA GT1 World Championship	Exim Bank Team China	2	0	0	0	0	0	NC
2011	GT Brasil	AH Competições; Mattheis AMG	10	3	0	2	5	85	14th
2011	Brasileiro de Marcas	Bassani Racing	2	0	0	0	0	7	38th
2012	Campeonato Brasileiro de GT	AMG Mattheis	14	3	0	0	10	182	**3rd**
2013	Stock Car Brasil	Voxx Racing	12	0	1	0	1	107	9th
2013	FIA GT Series	BMW Sports Trophy Team Brasil	12	0	0	0	0	37	11th
2014	Stock Car Brasil	Voxx Racing	21	1	0	0	2	174	7th
2014	Blancpain GT Sprint Series	BMW Sports Trophy Team Brasil	12	0	0	0	4	55	6th
2014	Brasileiro de Marcas	Bassani Racing	1	0	0	0	0	0	NC
2015	Stock Car Brasil	C2 Team	21	1	1	0	2	108	17th
2015	Blancpain GT Sprint Series	BMW Sports Trophy Team Brasil	12	0	0	0	0	40	11th
2015	Blancpain Endurance Series	BMW Sports Trophy Team Brasil	5	0	0	0	0	8	22nd
2016	Stock Car Brasil	Cavaleiro Racing	20	0	0	0	0	109	20th
2016	Blancpain GT Series Sprint Cup	Belgian Audi Club Team WRT	8	0	0	0	0	0	NC
2016	Blancpain GT Series Endurance Cup	Belgian Audi Club Team WRT	4	0	0	0	0	0	NC
2016	Porsche Endurance Cup	N/A	3	1	0	0	2	213	**2nd**
2017	Stock Car Brasil	Bardahl Hot Car	22	0	0	0	0	55	24th
2017	Porsche Endurance Cup	N/A	3	1	1	0	1	137	7th
2018	Stock Car Brasil	Squadra G-Force	9	0	0	0	0	10	30th
2018	Porsche Endurance Cup - 4.0	N/A	3	2	1	2	2	165	4th
2018	Dopamina Endurance Brasil - P1	JLM Racing	1	0	0	0	0	0	NC
2018–19	Jaguar I-Pace eTrophy	Jaguar Brazil Racing	10	3	3	2	9	149	**1st**
2019	Porsche Endurance Cup - 4.0	N/A	3	0	0	0	0	80	14th
2019	Imperio Endurance Brasil - GT4	Scuderia 111	4	0	0	1	4	225	10th
2019–20	Jaguar I-Pace eTrophy	ZEG iCarros Jaguar Brazil	10	4	4	2	9	162	**2nd**
2020	Porsche Endurance Cup - Carrera Cup	N/A	3	0	0	0	0	111	13th
2020	Lamborghini Super Trofeo North America - Pro	ANSA Motorsports	8	2	1	0	2	57	5th
2021	Stock Car Pro Series	MX Piquet Sports; Scuderia CJ	18	0	0	0	0	36	28th
2021	Porsche Endurance Cup - Carrera Cup	N/A	3	0	0	0	0	0	NC
2021	Lamborghini Super Trofeo North America - Pro	ANSA Motorsports	8	0	0	0	1	37	7th
2021	TCR South America Touring Car Championship	Scuderia CJ	1	0	0	0	1	44	17th
2021	Império Endurance Brasil - P1	Mottin Racing	1	1	0	0	1	170	16th
2022	Stock Car Pro Series	Scuderia CJ	1	0	0	0	0	0	-*

=== Complete Formula Renault 2.0 UK Championship results ===
(key) (Races in bold indicate pole position) (Races in italics indicate fastest lap)

Year	Entrant	1	2	3	4	5	6	7	8	9	10	11	12	13	14	15	16	17	DC	Points
2003	Manor Motorsport	SNE; 1; 13	SNE; 2; 12	BRH; Ret	THR; 12	SIL; 8	ROC; Ret	CRO; 1; 4	CRO; 2; 6	DON; 1; 4	DON; 2; 8	SNE; 7	BRH; 1; 6	BRH; 2 Ret	DON; 1 DNS	DON; 2 DNS	OUL; 1	OUL; 2	11th	150

=== Complete Spanish Formula Three Championship results ===
(key) (Races in bold indicate pole position) (Races in italics indicate fastest lap)

Year	Entrant	1	2	3	4	5	6	7	8	9	10	11	12	13	14	15	16	DC	Points
2006	Racing Engineering	VAL; 1; 7	VAL; 2; 5	MAG; 1; 4	MAG; 2; 6	JAR; 1; 1	JAR; 2; 2	**EST**; **1**; 16	EST; 2; 10	ALB; 1; 10	ALB; 2; 3	VAL; 1; 3	VAL; 2; 4	JER; 1 Ret	JER; 2 DNS	CAT; 1; 14	CAT; 2; 3	5th	74

=== Complete GP2 Series results ===
(key) (Races in bold indicate pole position) (Races in italics indicate fastest lap)

Year	Entrant	1	2	3	4	5	6	7	8	9	10	11	12	13	14	15	16	17	18	19	20	21	DC	Points
2007	Racing Engineering	BHR; FEA; 19^{†}	BHR; SPR; Ret	CAT; FEA; 7	CAT; SPR; 5	MON; FEA; 17^{†}	MAG; FEA	MAG; SPR	SIL; FEA	SIL; SPR	NÜR; FEA	NÜR; SPR	HUN; FEA	HUN; SPR	IST; FEA	IST; SPR	MNZ; FEA	MNZ; SPR	SPA; FEA	SPA; SPR	VAL; FEA	VAL; SPR	24th	4

=== Complete A1 Grand Prix results ===
Year	Entrant	1	2	3	4	5	6	7	8	9	10	11	12	13	14	15	16	17	18	19	20	DC	Points
2007–08	Brazil	NED; SPR; 13	NED; FEA; 11	CZE; SPR; 11	CZE; FEA; 7	MYS; SPR; 4	MYS; FEA; 3	CHN; SPR; 18	CHN; FEA; Ret	NZL; SPR; 13	NZL; FEA; 6	AUS; SPR; 8	AUS; FEA; 4	RSA; SPR	RSA; FEA	MEX; SPR	MEX; FEA	CHN; SPR	CHN; FEA	GBR; SPR	GBR; SPR	11th	44

=== GT1 World Championship results ===
Year	Team	Car	1	2	3	4	5	6	7	8	9	10	11	12	13	14	15	16	17	18	19	20	Pos	Points
2010	Mad-Croc Racing	Corvette	ABU; QR	ABU; CR	SIL; QR	SIL; CR	BRN; QR	BRN; CR	PRI; QR	PRI; CR	SPA; QR	SPA; CR	NÜR; QR	NÜR; CR	ALG; QR	ALG; CR	NAV; QR	NAV; CR	INT; QR; 19	INT; CR; 20			34th	12
2010	Reiter	Lamborghini																			SAN; QR; 5	SAN; CR; 4	34th	12
2011	Exim Bank Team China	Corvette	ABU; QR	ABU; CR	ZOL; QR	ZOL; CR	ALG; QR	ALG; CR	SAC; QR	SAC; CR	SIL; QR	SIL; CR	NAV; QR	NAV; CR	PRI; QR	PRI; CR	ORD; QR; 15	ORD; CR; 16	BEI; QR	BEI; CR	SAN; QR	SAN; CR	42nd	0

=== Complete Stock Car Brasil results ===
Year	Team	Car	1	2	3	4	5	6	7	8	9	10	11	12	13	14	15	16	17	18	19	20	21	Rank	Points
2011	Crystal Racing Team	Chevrolet Vectra	CTB	INT	RBP	VEL; 22	CGD; 18	RIO																32nd	0
2011	Scuderia 111	Peugeot 408							INT; 22	SAL	SCZ	LON	BSB	VEL										32nd	0
2013	Voxx Racing	Peugeot 408	INT; 28	CUR; 9	TAR; 10	SAL; 24	BRA; 16	CAS; 8	RBP; 19	CAS; 4	VEL; 9	CUR; 6	**BRA**; 2	INT; Ret										9th	107
2014	Voxx Racing	Peugeot 408	INT; 1	SCZ; 1	SCZ; 2	BRA; 1	BRA; 2	GOI; 1	GOI; 2	GOI; 1	CAS; 1	CAS; 2	CUR; 1	CUR; 2	VEL; 1	VEL; 2	SAL; 1	SAL; 2	TAR; 1	TAR; 2	RBP; 1	RBP; 2	CUR; 1	NC	N/A

=== Complete Jaguar I-Pace eTrophy results ===
(key) (Races in bold indicate pole position)

Year	Team	Car	Class	1	2	3	4	5	6	7	8	9	10	D.C.	Points
2018–19	Jaguar Brazil Racing	Jaguar I-PACE eTROPHY	P	ADR; 2^{2}	MEX; 3^{3}	HKG; 3^{3}	SYX; 4^{4}	RME; **1**^{1}	PAR; 3^{3}	MCO; 2^{2}	BER; 2^{2}	NYC; **1**^{1}	NYC; **1**^{1}	1st	149
2019–20	ZEG iCarros Jaguar Brazil	Jaguar I-PACE eTROPHY	P	ADR; 2^{2}	ADR; **1**^{1}	MEX; 1^{1}	BER; 4^{4}	BER; 1^{1}	BER; **1**^{1}	BER; **2**^{2}	BER; 2^{2}	BER; 2^{2}	BER; 3^{3}	2nd	162
