= Cacá Bueno =

Brazilian racing driver

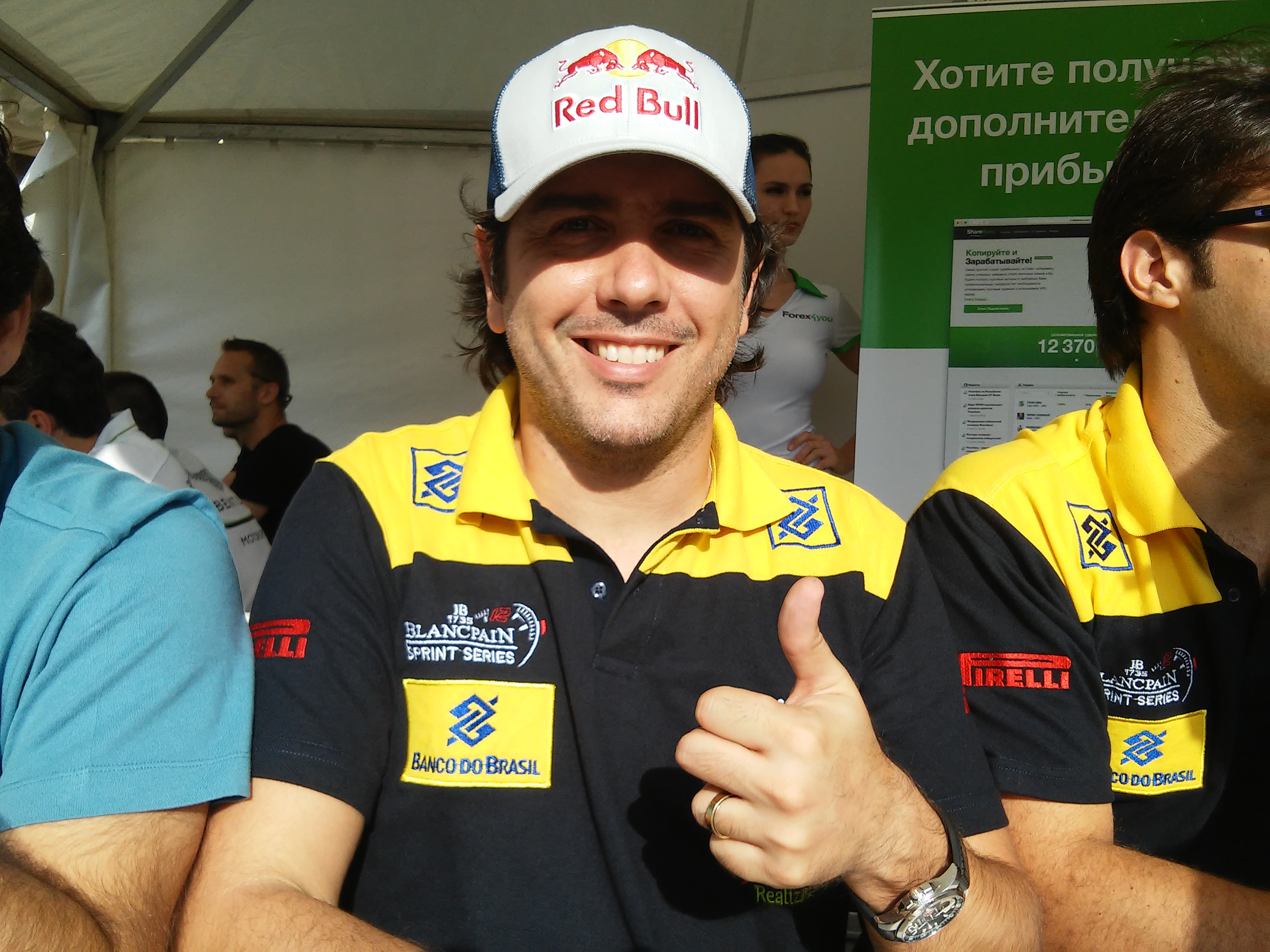
- Bueno in 2015
- Nationality: (Brazil) Brazilian
- Born: Carlos Eduardo dos Santos Galvão Bueno Filho; 24 January 1976 (age 50) Rio de Janeiro, Brazil
- Relatives: Galvão Bueno (father); Popó Bueno (brother); Luca Bueno (brother)

Stock Car Pro Series career
- Debut season: 2002
- Current team: Scuderia Chiarelli
- Categorisation: FIA Platinum
- Car number: 0
- Former teams: Action Power; RS Competições; Eurofarma RC; Red Bull Racing; Cimed Racing; Crown Racing; KTF Sports
- Starts: 418
- Championships: 5 (2006, 2007, 2009, 2011, 2012)
- Wins: 37
- Poles: 38
- Fastest laps: 24

Previous series
- 1995–1996 1997 1996–1997 1998–1999 2000–2001: Copa Petrobrás de Fórmula Uno; Copa Palio; Stock Car Light; South American Super Touring; TC 2000

Championship titles
- 1997 1999 2006–07, 2009 2010–12 2011–12: Stock Car Light; South American Super Touring; Stock Car Brasil; Trofeo Línea; Stock Car Brasil

Carlos Eduardo dos Santos Galvão "Caca" Bueno Filho (born 24 January 1976) is a Brazilian professional racing driver. He competes full-time in the Stock Car Pro Series, driving the No. 0 Chevrolet Tracker for Scuderia Chiarelli. He is best known for winning the Stock Car Brasil championship five times.

== Career ==
Born in Rio de Janeiro, Bueno started his karting career in 1988 and won the São Paulo states championship in 1992.

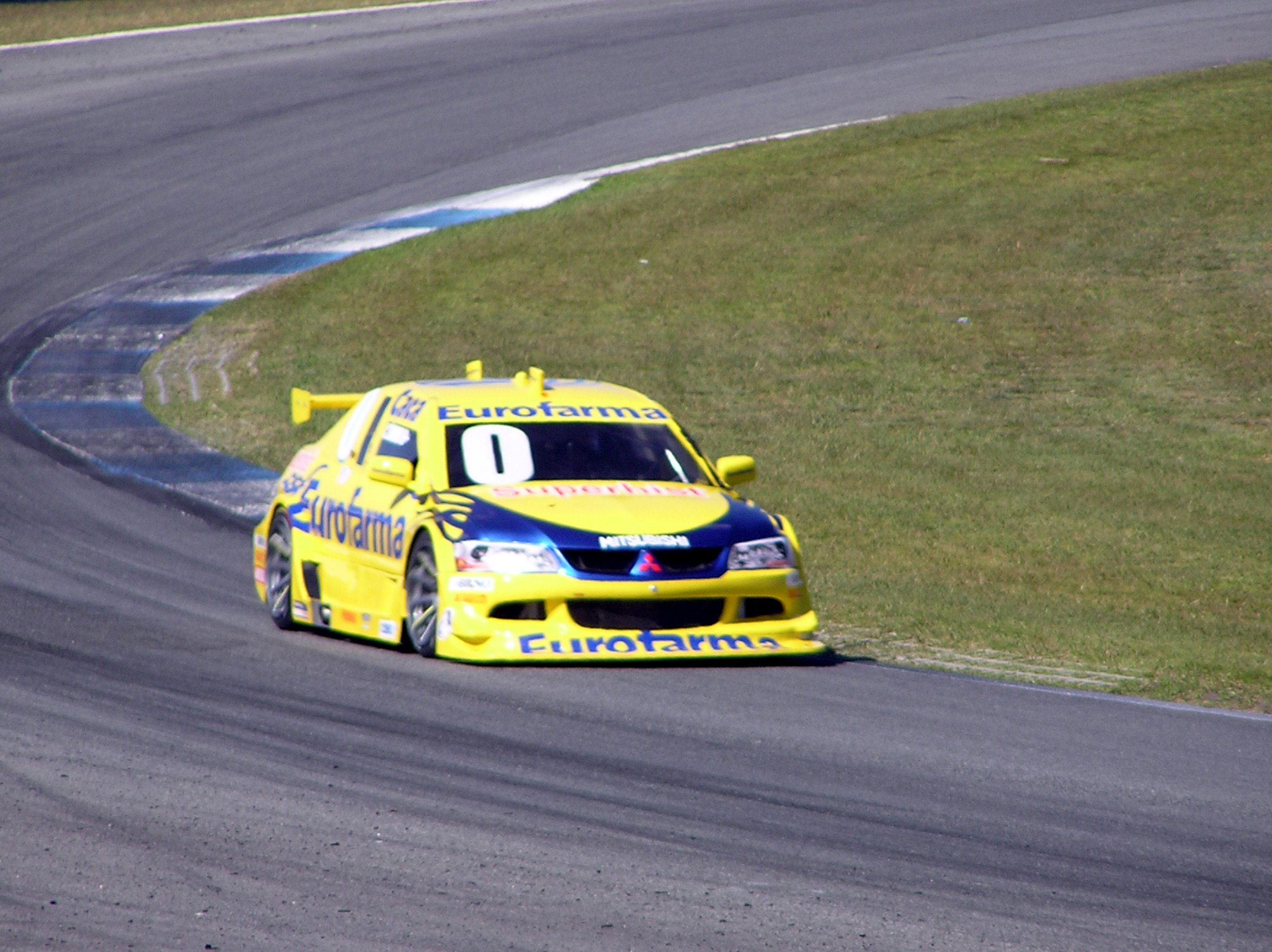
Cacá driving his Mitsubishi Lancer in 2006.

Bueno's father, Galvão is a Brazilian sports commentator, very famous in Brazil as the former host of the Formula One races, National football team matches and key Brazilian football matches, and friend with Brazilian sport stars. Therefore, Bueno grew up near Brazilian sports idols such as Ayrton Senna.

Although Formula One champion Senna was his idol, Bueno preferred touring car racing and debuted to Stock Car Brasil in 2002. He finished third in his first championship and became vice-champion for three consecutive years (2003–2005).

Bueno won the Stock Car Brasil championship in 2006 at last and became double-champion in 2007. He won the championship again in 2009, 2011 and 2012.

Bueno also has competed in the TC2000, an Argentine touring car series, and ended the 2001 season in third place. In recent years, he competed in the 2007 season in parallel with Stock Car Brasil.

Bueno made his World Touring Car Championship debut for Chevrolet at Brands Hatch. He retired from the first race due to an engine fire, which also stopped him from starting the second race.

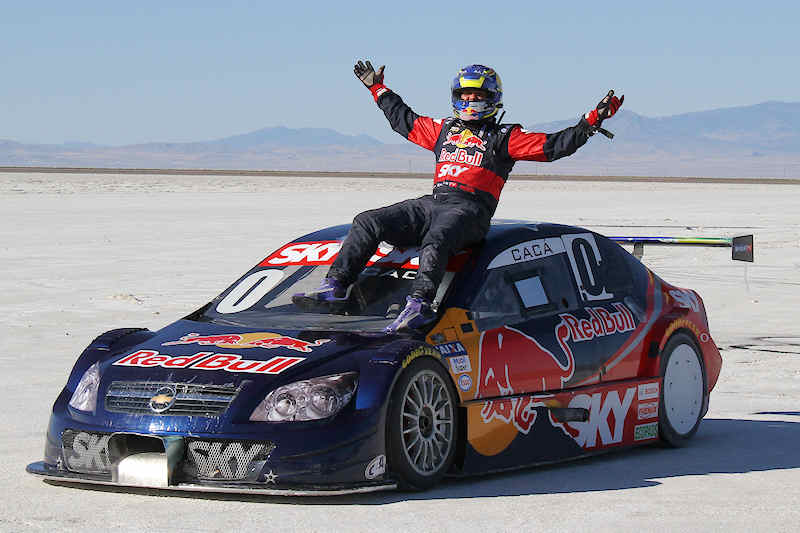
Bueno after running a Chevrolet Vectra on the Bonneville Salt Flats.

In August 2010, Bueno ran a Chevrolet Vectra on the Bonneville Salt Flats at speeds over 340 km/h (~210 mph).

== Racing record ==
=== Career summary ===
Season	Series	Team	Races	Wins	Poles	F.Laps	Podiums	Points	Position
1995	Copa Petrobras de Formula Uno - Aspirados	N/A	2	0	0	0	1	14	19th
1996	Stock Car Brasil	Brahma Sports Team	10	0	0	0	0	26	16th
1996	Stock Car Brasil B	Brahma Sports Team	10	2	4	4	6	N/A	**3rd**
1996	Copa Fiat Uno de Turismo - Graduados	N/A	5	0	0	0	0	26	10th
1997	Stock Car Brasil	Brahma Sports Team	10	1	0	1	2	N/A	9th
1997	Stock Car Brasil B	Brahma Sports Team	10	7	8	8	8	N/A	**1st**
1997	Copa Fiat Palio de Turismo - Class B	N/A	10	2	2	2	3	71	4th
1998	South American Super Touring Car Championship	EF Racing	12	2	5	3	7	134	**2nd**
1999	South American Super Touring Car Championship	EF Racing	12	3	3	3	8	152	**1st**
2000	Turismo Competición 2000	Peugeot Sport-Fernandez Competicion	8	0	0	0	0	2	26th
2001	Turismo Competición 2000	Peugeot Sport-Fernandez Competicion	14	0	0	1	2	91	4th
2002	Stock Car Brasil	Action Power	12	3	4	1	7	153	**3rd**
2003	Stock Car Brasil	Petrobras-RS	12	1	2	1	7	139	**2nd**
2004	Stock Car Brasil	Petrobras-Action Power	12	3	2	2	5	153	**2nd**
2004	Turismo Competición 2000	Honda Racing Petrobras	1	0	0	0	0	N/A	N/A
2005	Stock Car Brasil	Petrobras-Action Power	12	4	3	0	5	165	**2nd**
2005	Turismo Competición 2000	Honda Petrobras Argentina	1	0	0	0	0	N/A	N/A
2006	Stock Car Brasil	Eurofarma RC	12	4	2	1	5	257	**1st**
2006	Turismo Competición 2000	Sportteam Competicion	1	0	0	0	0	N/A	N/A
2006	Porsche Supercup	Morellato Racing Team PZ Essen	2	0	0	0	0	N/A	N/A
2007	Stock Car Brasil	Eurofarma RC	12	3	0	1	5	278	**1st**
2007	Turismo Competición 2000	Honda Lubrax	13	0	1	0	4	92	8th
2008	Stock Car Brasil	Eurofarma RC	12	2	2	3	4	243	4th
2008	Turismo Competición 2000	Honda Petrobras	1	0	0	0	0	N/A	N/A
2009	Stock Car Brasil	Red Bull Racing	12	1	3	1	8	300	**1st**
2009	Turismo Carretera	HAZ Racing Team	1	0	0	0	0	1	63rd
2009	Top Race V6	Sportteam TRV6	1	0	0	0	0	N/A	N/A
2009	TC2000 Copa Endurance Series Argentina	Equipo Petrobas	3	0	0	0	1	27	5th
2010	Stock Car Brasil	Red Bull Racing	12	2	2	1	3	264	**2nd**
2010	Trofeo Linea Brasil	GT Competições	11	3	3	3	6	102	**1st**
2010	World Touring Car Championship	Chevrolet RML	1	0	0	0	0	N/A	N/A
2011	Stock Car Brasil	Red Bull Racing	12	3	6	3	6	271	**1st**
2011	Trofeo Linea Brasil	GT Competições	12	5	2	4	6	126	**1st**
2011	World Touring Car Championship	Chevrolet RML	2	0	0	0	1	25	15th
2011	Turismo Competición 2000	Equipo Fiat Oil Combustibles	1	0	0	0	0	N/A	N/A
2012	Stock Car Brasil	Red Bull Racing	12	3	4	1	5	195	**1st**
2012	Campeonato Brasileiro de GT	BMW Team Brasil	15	3	2	4	8	204	**2nd**
2012	Copa Fiat Brasil	GT Competições	11	5	3	4	9	142	**1st**
2012	Súper TC 2000	PSG16 Team	3	0	1	0	2	60	16th
2013	Stock Car Brasil	Red Bull Racing	12	2	1	0	3	196	**3rd**
2013	FIA GT Series	BMW Sports Trophy Team Brasil	11	0	0	0	0	40	10th
2014	Stock Car Brasil	Red Bull Racing	21	0	2	1	3	191	**3rd**
2014	Blancpain GT Sprint Series	BMW Sports Trophy Team Brasil	12	0	0	0	4	55	6th
2014	Brasileiro de Marcas	Full Time Sports	1	0	0	0	0	N/A	N/A
2014	Súper TC 2000	Equipo Petronas	1	0	0	0	1	N/A	N/A
2015	Stock Car Brasil	Red Bull Racing	19	2	0	1	5	210	**2nd**
2015	Blancpain GT Sprint Series	BMW Sports Trophy Team Brasil	12	0	0	0	0	40	11th
2015	Blancpain Endurance Series	BMW Sports Trophy Team Brasil	4	0	0	0	0	6	24th
2015	FARA Endurance Championship - MP-1A	Ginetta USA	1	1	1	0	1	20	14th
2016	Stock Car Brasil	Red Bull Racing	21	2	4	2	2	186	9th
2016	Porsche Endurance Series	N/A	3	0	0	1	0	135	10th
2017	Stock Car Brasil	Cimed Racing	22	1	0	1	4	217	6th
2017	Porsche Endurance Series	N/A	3	0	1	1	1	135	8th
2017	Súper TC 2000	Citroën Súper TC2000 Team	1	0	0	0	0	N/A	N/A
2018	Stock Car Brasil	Cimed Racing	20	1	1	1	4	172	9th
2018	Porsche Endurance Series	N/A	3	0	0	0	0	90	15th
2018	International GT Open	Drivex School	4	0	0	0	0	3	18th
2019	Stock Car Brasil	Cimed Racing	21	0	0	0	3	234	8th
2019	Porsche Endurance Series	N/A	3	0	0	0	0	133	6th
2019	Porsche GT3 Cup Challenge Brasil	N/A	1	0	0	1	0	N/A	N/A
2019	Jaguar I-Pace eTrophy	Jaguar Brazil Racing	10	3	4	4	5	121	**2nd**
2020	Stock Car Brasil	Crown Racing	18	0	0	1	0	125	17th
2020	Porsche Endurance Series	N/A	3	0	0	0	0	113	12th
2020	Jaguar I-Pace eTrophy	ZEG iCarros Jaguar Brazil	8	2	4	2	7	111	**3rd**
2021	Stock Car Brasil	Crown Racing	24	0	1	0	1	167	17th
2021	Porsche Endurance Series	N/A	3	0	0	0	0	49	19th
2021	Império Endurance Brasil	Team RC	8	3	6	0	7	895	**1st**
2022	Stock Car Pro Series	Crown Racing	23	0	0	0	0	100	23rd
2023	Stock Car Pro Series	KTF Sports	24	0	0	0	1	117	23rd
2023	TC2000 Championship	YPF Honda RV Racing Team	1	0	0	0	0	0	NC†
2024	Stock Car Pro Series	KTF Sports	24	0	0	0	1	429	23rd
2024	TCR South America Touring Car Championship	PMO Racing	1	0	0	0	0	15	47th
2024	TCR Brazil Touring Car Championship	PMO Racing	1	0	0	0	0	15	27th
2025	Stock Car Pro Series	Scuderia Chiarelli	23	0	0	0	1	438	22nd
2025	NASCAR Brasil Series	Team RC	21	1	2	4	6	252	**3rd**
2026	Stock Car Pro Series	Scuderia Chiarelli	19	0	0	0	0	373	20th*

^{†} As Bueno was a guest driver, he was ineligible for points. ^{*} Season still in progress.

=== Stock Car Pro Series results ===
Year	Team	Car	1	2	3	4	5	6	7	8	9	10	11	12	13	14	15	16	17	18	19	20	21	22	23	24	25	Rank	Points
2002	Petrobras-Action Power	Chevrolet Vectra	RIO; Ret	CTB; 2	INT; 14	LON; Ret	CGD; Ret	INT; 3	RIO; 1	GUA; 1	BSB; 2	CTB; Ret	LON; 1	INT; 2														3rd	153
2003	Petrobras RS	Chevrolet Vectra	CTB; 3	CGD; 15	INT; 3	RIO; 14	LON; 9	INT; 15	CTB; 3	CGD; 2	**RIO**; 1	BSB; 11	CTB; 3	**INT**; 3														2nd	139
2004	Petrobras-Action Power	Chevrolet Astra	**CTB**; EX	INT; 3	TAR; 1	LON; Ret	RIO; 4	INT; 1	CTB; 11	LON; 2	RIO; 7	BSB; Ret	**CGD**; 1	INT; 4														2nd	153
2005	Petrobras-Action Power	Chevrolet Astra	INT; 1	CTB; 1	RIO; 2	INT; 5	**CTB**; 4	LON; Ret	**BSB**; 1	**SCZ**; 1	TAR; 14	ARG; 18	RIO; 13	INT; 4														2nd	155
2006	Eurofarma RC	Mitsubishi Lancer	INT; 1	CTB; Ret	**CGD**; 1	INT; 1	**LON**; 1	CTB; 16	SCZ; 3	BSB; Ret	TAR; 5	ARG; 7	RIO; 14	INT; 8														1st	257
2007	Eurofarma RC	Mitsubishi Lancer	INT; 7	CTB; Ret	CGD; 4	INT; 2	LON; 4	SCZ; 1	CTB; 1	BSB; 26	ARG; 1	TAR; 2	RIO; 10	INT; Ret														1st	278
2008	Eurofarma RC	Mitsubishi Lancer	INT; 3	BSB; Ret	CTB; 5	SCZ; 1	CGD; Ret	INT; 3	**RIO**; 9	LON; 8	CTB; Ret	BSB; 17	TAR; 1	**INT**; 12														4th	243
2009	Red Bull Racing	Peugeot 307	INT; 13	CTB; 2	BSB; Ret	**SCZ**; 2	INT; 3	SAL; 1	**RIO**; 2	CGD; 9	CTB; 3	BSB; 3	**TAR**; 3	INT; 5														1st	300
2010	Red Bull Racing	Peugeot 307	**INT**; 14	CTB; 9	VEL; 6	RIO; 7	RBP; 9	**SAL**; 1	INT; 4	CGD; DSQ	**LON**; 2	SCZ; 12	BSB; 1	CTB; 7														2nd	264
2011	Red Bull Racing	Peugeot 408	CTB; 11	INT; 1	RBP; 3	**VEL**; 7	CGD; 13	**RIO**; 1	INT; 22	SAL; 11	**SCZ**; 3	**LON**; 1	**BSB**; 3	**VEL**; 11														1st	271
2012	Red Bull Racing	Chevrolet Sonic	INT; 1	CTB; Ret	**VEL**; 1	**RBP**; 2	**LON**; 1	RIO; 8	SAL; 5	CGD; 25	TAR; 5	CUR; 5	BRA; 9	**INT**; 3														1st	195
2013	Red Bull Racing	Chevrolet Sonic	INT; 1	CUR; 5	TAR; 5	SAL; 4	BRA; 1	CAS; 11	RBP; 4	CAS; 7	**VEL**; 15	CUR; 5	BRA; 25	INT; 3														3rd	196
2014	Red Bull Racing	Chevrolet Sonic	**INT**; **1**; 7	**SCZ**; **1**; 2	SCZ; 2; 10	BRA; 1; 20	BRA; 2; 3	GOI; 1 Ret	GOI; 2; 8	GOI; 1; 8	CAS; 1; 4	CAS; 2 Ret	CUR; 1; 5	CUR; 2; 4	VEL; 1; 2	VEL; 2; 8	SCZ; 1; 15	SCZ; 2; 14	TAR; 1; 14	TAR; 2; 4	SAL; 1 Ret	SAL; 2; 10	CUR; 1; 4					3rd	191
2015	Red Bull Racing	Chevrolet Sonic	GOI; 1; 4	RBP; 1; 1	RBP; 2 Ret	VEL; 1; 5	VEL; 2; 2	CUR; 1; 7	CUR; 2; 5	SCZ; 1; 6	SCZ; 2; 3	CUR; 1 EXC	CUR; 2 EXC	GOI; 1; 9	CAS; 1; 5	CAS; 2; 5	MOU; 1; 10	**MOU**; **2**; 2	CUR; 1; 13	CUR; 2 Ret	TAR; 1; 9	TAR; 2; 1	INT; 1; 20					2nd	214
2016	Red Bull Racing	Chevrolet Cruze	CUR; 1; 31	**VEL**; **1**; 1	VEL; 2; 11	**GOI**; **1**; 20	GOI; 2; 6	SCZ; 1; 18	SCZ; 2; 7	TAR; 1; 20	TAR; 2; 5	**CAS**; **1**; 1	CAS; 2; 12	INT; 1; 18†	LON; 1; 7	LON; 2; 15	CUR; 1; 8	CUR; 2; 15	GOI; 1; 22†	GOI; 2 Ret	CRI; 1; 16	CRI; 2; 24†	INT; 1; 4					9th	186
2017	Cimed Racing	Chevrolet Cruze	GOI; 1; 7	GOI; 2; 9	VEL; 1; 2	VEL; 2; 17	SCZ; 1; 10	**SCZ**; **2**; 13	CAS; 1; 12	CAS; 2; 14	CUR; 1; 3	CRI; 1; 7	CRI; 2; 8	VCA; 1; 2	VCA; 2; 10	LON; 1; 7	LON; 2; 10	ARG; 1; 19	ARG; 2; 5	TAR; 1; 18	TAR; 2; 8	GOI; 1; 12	GOI; 2; 3	INT; 1; 17				9th	225
2018	Cimed Racing	Chevrolet Cruze	INT; 1; 13	CUR; 1; 7	CUR; 2; 2	**VEL**; **1**; 1	VEL; 2; 8	LON; 1; 9	LON; 2; 7	SCZ; 1; 24	SCZ; 2 DNS	GOI; 1 Ret	MOU; 1; 4	MOU; 2; 1	CAS; 1; 6	CAS; 2; 5	VCA; 1; 3	VCA; 2 Ret	TAR; 1; 21	TAR; 2; 7	GOI; 1; 19	GOI; 2 Ret	INT; 1 Ret					9th	172
2019	Cimed Racing	Chevrolet Cruze	VEL; 1; 21	VCA; 1; 17	VCA; 2; 2	GOI; 1; 7	GOI; 2; 12	LON; 1; 15	LON; 2 Ret	SCZ; 1; 7	SCZ; 2; 8	MOU; 1; 3	MOU; 2; 12	INT; 1; 14	VEL; 1; 5	VEL; 2; 5	CAS; 1; 3	CAS; 2; 11	VCA; 1; 4	VCA; 2; 9	GOI; 1; 11	GOI; 2; 14	INT; 1; 19					8th	234
2020	Crown Racing	Chevrolet Cruze	GOI; 1; 5	GOI; 2; 9	INT; 1; 16	INT; 2 Ret	LON; 1; 13	LON; 2; 8	CAS; 1 Ret	CAS; 2; 18	CAS; 3; 13	VCA; 1; 11	VCA; 2; 18	CUR; 1; 11	CUR; 2; 11	CUR; 3; 16	GOI; 1 Ret	GOI; 2 Ret	GOI; 3; 17	INT; 1; 15								17th	125
2021	Crown Racing	Chevrolet Cruze	**GOI**; **1**; 2	GOI; 2; 21	INT; 1 Ret	INT; 2; 5	VCA; 1 Ret	VCA; 2; 19	VCA; 1; 12	VCA; 2 Ret	CAS; 1; 23	CAS; 2; 17	CUR; 1; 8	CUR; 2; 13	CUR; 1; 9	CUR; 2; 4	GOI; 1; 19	GOI; 2; 11	GOI; 1; 17	GOI; 2; 9	VCA; 1; 20	VCA; 2; 12	SCZ; 1; 15	SCZ; 2 Ret	INT; 1; 9	INT; 2; 23		17th	167
2022	Crown Racing	Chevrolet Cruze	INT; 1; 23	GOI; 1; 25	GOI; 2; 11	RIO; 1; 23	RIO; 2; 15	VCA; 1; 15	VCA; 2; 16	VEL; 1; 23	VEL; 2; 10	VEL; 1; 10	VEL; 2; 15	INT; 1 Ret	INT; 2; 12	VCA; 1; 17	VCA; 2 Ret	SCZ; 1; 9	SCZ; 2 Ret	GOI; 1; 28	GOI; 2 Ret	GOI; 1; 26	GOI; 2; 20	INT; 1; 14	INT; 2; 10			23rd	100
2023	KTF Sports	Chevrolet Cruze	GOI; 1 Ret	GOI; 2; 19	INT; 1; 14	INT; 2; 13	TAR; 1; 9	TAR; 2; 22	CAS; 1; 20	CAS; 2; 2	INT; 1; 13	INT; 2; 27	VCA; 1; 13	VCA; 2 Ret	GOI; 1; 21	GOI; 2; 10	VEL; 1; 13	VEL; 2; 21	BUE; 1; 20	BUE; 2; 13	VCA; 1; 10	VCA; 2; 19	CAS; 1; 19	CAS; 2; 23	INT; 1; 21	INT; 2 Ret		23rd	117
2024	KTF Sports	Chevrolet Cruze	GOI; 1; 26	GOI; 2; 14	VCA; 1; 15	VCA; 2 C	INT; 1 WD	INT; 2 WD	CAS; 1	CAS; 2	VCA; 1; 8	VCA; 2 Ret	VCA; 3; 21	GOI; 1; 19	GOI; 2; 17	BLH; 1; 6	BLH; 2; 3	VEL; 1; 18	VEL; 2; 12	BUE; 1; 8	BUE; 2; 20	URU; 1; 26	URU; 2; 24	GOI; 1; 13	GOI; 2; 16	INT; 1; 15	INT; 2; 19	23rd	429
2025	Scuderia Chiarelli	Chevrolet Tracker	INT; 1 Ret	CAS; 1; 12	CAS; 2; 23	VEL; 1; 15	VEL; 2; 4	VCA; 1; 15	VCA; 2; 22	CRS; 1; 22	CRS; 2; 13	CAS; 1 Ret	CAS; 2; 23	VCA; 1; 13	VCA; 2 Ret	VCA; 1; 21	VCA; 2; 15	MOU; 1; 25	MOU; 2; 9	CUI; 1; 17	CUI; 2; 3	BRA; 1 DSQ	BRA; 2; 9	INT; 1 Ret	INT; 2; 15			22nd	438
2026	Scuderia Chiarelli	Chevrolet Tracker	CRS; 1; 16	CRS; 2; 14	CAS; 1; 28	CAS; 2 Ret	INT; 1; 16	INT; 2; 16	GOI; 1; 9	GOI; 2; 16	CUI; 1; 18	CUI; 2; 8	VCA; 1; 18	VCA; 2; 14	SCZ; 1; 22	SCZ; 2; 16	CRS; 1; 18	CRS; 2; 11	BRA; 1; 13	CAS; 1; 13	CAS; 2; 15	VEL; 1	INT; 1	INT; 2				20th*	373*

^{†} Did not finish the race, but was classified as he completed over 90% of the race distance. ^{*} Season still in progress.

=== Complete World Touring Car Championship results ===
(key) (Races in bold indicate pole position) (Races in italics indicate fastest lap)

Year	Team	Car	1	2	3	4	5	6	7	8	9	10	11	12	13	14	15	16	17	18	19	20	21	22	23	24	DC	Points
2010	Chevrolet RML	Chevrolet Cruze LT	BRA; 1	BRA; 2	MAR; 1	MAR; 2	ITA; 1	ITA; 2	BEL; 1	BEL; 2	POR; 1	POR; 2	GBR; 1 Ret	GBR; 2 DNS	CZE; 1	CZE; 2	GER; 1	GER; 2	ESP; 1	ESP; 2	JPN; 1	JPN; 2	MAC; 1	MAC; 2			NC	0
2011	Chevrolet RML	Chevrolet Cruze 1.6T	BRA; 1; 3	BRA; 2; 5	BEL; 1	BEL; 2	ITA; 1	ITA; 2	HUN; 1	HUN; 2	CZE; 1	CZE; 2	POR; 1	POR; 2	GBR; 1	GBR; 2	GER; 1	GER; 2	ESP; 1	ESP; 2	JPN; 1	JPN; 2	CHN; 1	CHN; 2	MAC; 1	MAC; 2	15th	25

=== Complete FIA GT Series results ===
Year	Team	Car	Class	1	2	3	4	5	6	7	8	9	10	11	12	Pos.	Points
2013	BMW Sport Trophy Team Brasil	BMW Z4 GT3	Pro	NOG; QR; 7	NOG; CR; 9	ZOL; QR; 11	ZOL; CR; 8	ZAN; QR; 5	ZAN; CR; 7	SVK; QR; 7	SVK; CR; DNS	NAV; QR; 10	NAV; CR; 12	BAK; QR; 8	BAK; CR; Ret	10th	40

=== Complete Blancpain Sprint Series results ===
Year	Team	Car	Class	1	2	3	4	5	6	7	8	9	10	11	12	13	14	Pos.	Points
2014	BMW Sport Trophy Team Brasil	BMW Z4 GT3	Pro	NOG; QR; 3	NOG; CR; 5	BRH; QR; 3	BRH; CR; 3	ZAN; QR; Ret	ZAN; CR; 14	SVK; QR; 7	SVK; CR; 2	ALG; QR; 9	ALG; CR; 14	ZOL; QR; 21	ZOL; CR; 8	BAK; QR	BAK; CR	6th	55
2015	BMW Sports Trophy Team Brasil	BMW Z4 GT3	Pro	NOG; QR	NOG; CR	BRH; QR; 4	BRH; CR; 4	ZOL; QR; 7	ZOL; CR; 4	MOS; QR; 4	MOS; CR; Ret	ALG; QR; 7	ALG; CR; Ret	MIS; QR; 6	MIS; CR; 6	ZAN; QR; 8	ZAN; CR; 10	11th	40

=== Complete Jaguar I-Pace eTrophy results ===
(key) (Races in bold indicate pole position)

Year	Team	Car	Class	1	2	3	4	5	6	7	8	9	10	D.C.	Points
2018–19	Jaguar Brazil Racing	Jaguar I-PACE eTROPHY	P	ADR; 4	MEX; 4	**HKG**; 5	**SYX**; 1	RME; 6	PAR; Ret	**MCO**; 1	**BER**; 1	NYC; 2	NYC; 2	2nd	121
2019–20	ZEG iCarros Jaguar Brazil	Jaguar I-PACE eTROPHY	P	ADR	ADR	MEX; 7	**BER**; 1	**BER**; 3	BER; 2	BER; 3	BER; 3	**BER**; 3	**BER**; 1	3rd	111

== Personal life ==
- His brother Paulo Eduardo Popó Bueno is also a racing driver.
- Cacá Bueno supports the Brazilian football team Fluminense.

Sporting positions
Preceded by Giuliano Losacco	Stock Car Brasil; Champion; 2006–2007	Succeeded by Ricardo Maurício
Preceded by Ricardo Maurício	Stock Car Brasil; Champion; 2009	Succeeded by Max Wilson
Preceded by Max Wilson	Stock Car Brasil; Champion; 2011–2012	Succeeded by Ricardo Maurício
