= Galvão Bueno =

Brazilian sports commentator

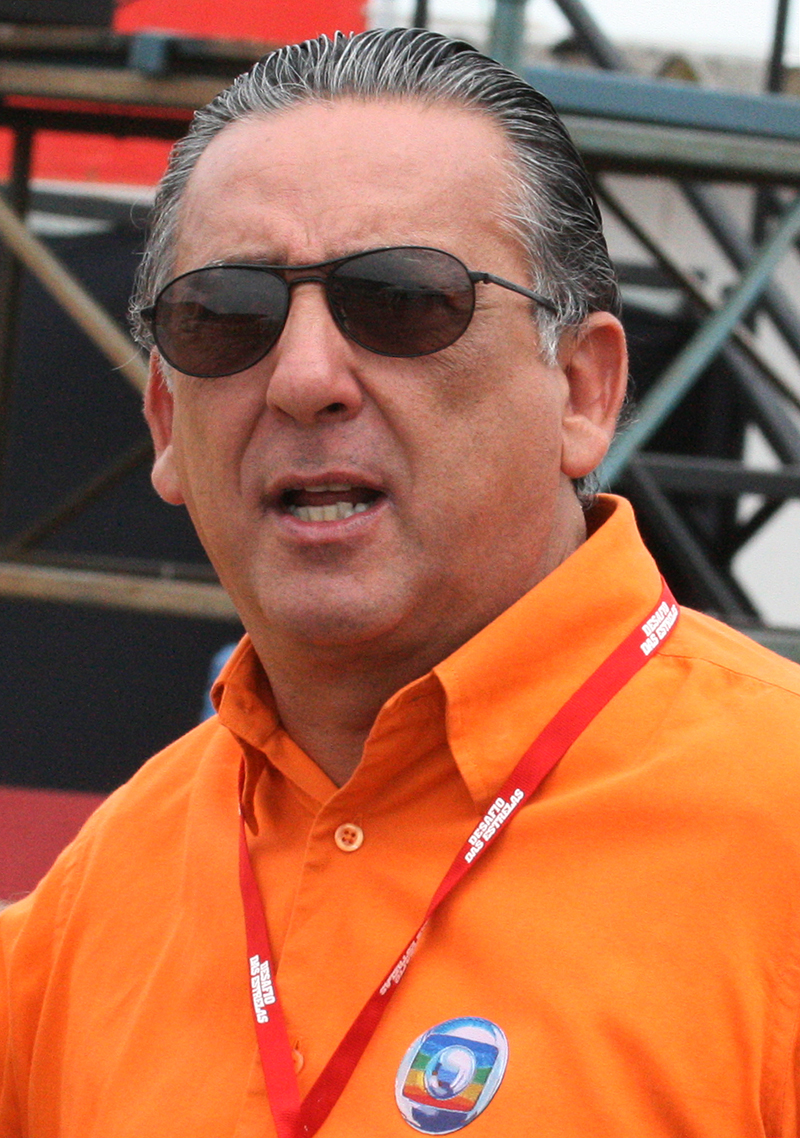
- Galvão Bueno in 2007
- Born: Carlos Eduardo dos Santos Galvão Bueno; 21 July 1950 (age 76); Rio de Janeiro, Brazil
- Occupations: Football, Formula 1 commentator
- Employer(s): TV Globo (1980–1991, 1993–2024); Rede OM (1992); Rede Bandeirantes (1977–1980, 2025); Amazon Prime Video (2025); SBT (2026–present)
- Spouses: Lúcia (divorced) Desirée Soares (m. 2000)
- Children: 4, including Cacá Bueno and Luca Bueno

Carlos Eduardo dos Santos Galvão Bueno, known as Galvão Bueno (Portuguese pronunciation: [ɡawˈvɐ̃w̃ buˈenu]; born 21 July 1950), is a Brazilian television personality and commentator. He has commentated on Brazil national football team matches, key Brazilian football championship matches, top sporting events and Formula One races.

== Personal life ==
Born on July 21, 1950, in the city of Rio de Janeiro to the actress Mildred dos Santos and journalist Aldo Viana Galvão Bueno, Galvão moved to São Paulo with his family when he was six years old. There, as a teenager, he began practicing equestrianism, volleyball, football, handball, swimming and karting. At age 15, he moved to Brasília where he met Lúcia, who would become his first wife. He studied business administration and economy but dropped out to start physical education. In 1974, he was working in the plastic industry, but maintained his passion for sports.

In 2000, he married Desirée Soares with whom he lives in Londrina, Paraná. He is the father of racing driver Carlos Cacá Bueno and film director Luca Bueno.

== Career ==
Bueno won a contest to become a radio sports commentator and began his career in 1974 commentating football matches and Formula 1 racing for Radio Gazeta. After three years, he moved to work on TV for Rede Record. Soon after, he moved to work for TV Bandeirantes and TV Guanabara announcing the nationwide Formula 1 racing coverage in Brazil. In 1983, he also started announcing football matches for TV Bandeirantes and his remarkable style was quickly praised by Brazilians. In the same year, he covered for Globo Esporte the death of former Brazilian player Mané Garrincha at the Maracanã Stadium. Galvão moved to Rede Globo where he continued calliing Formula 1 and football, but in 1992 he left to become the head of the sports department at OM (now CNT). One year later, he moved back to Globo, where he heads the sports department and calls Formula One races, Brazil national football team matches, key Brazilian football championship matches and top sporting events. Because of his long and successful career, Brazilians associate him with the many major sporting events he called while being the on-air announcer on TV, such as his friend Ayrton Senna's three world championships, his fatal crash during the 1994 San Marino Grand Prix and the 1994 and 2002 FIFA World Cup wins by Brazil. He has called the last eight FIFA World Cups for Rede Globo.

== Style ==
Bueno's style is flashy, pointed with superlative adjectives, and a passionate approach. His ardent and unilateral approach when hosting international events with the presence of a Brazilian team or Brazilian athletes has generated both sympathy and controversy. Critics highlight the large number of on-air mistakes committed by the host, added to a high degree of rudeness while off-camera. Some of his bloopers both on and off-camera have become internet phenomena in websites such as YouTube. In football events, he used to be usually supported by the former referees José Roberto Wright and Arnaldo Cézar Coelho, who retired from television, and is now usually supported by former footballers Walter Casagrande and Caio Ribeiro.

== Cala a boca Galvão (Internet meme) ==
Cala a boca Galvão ("Shut up Galvão", in Portuguese) was an Internet meme spread by Brazilians via Twitter on 11 June 2010 called by The New York Times "one of history's most successful cyberpranks." The phenomenon started during the opening ceremony of the 2010 FIFA World Cup. Bueno, the host and commentator for Rede Globo's national broadcast of the World Cup, was met with criticism from Brazilian viewers and "Cala a boca Galvão" started to spread on Brazilian Twitter pages. After the expression became the most popular Twitter topic in Brazil, Brazilians increased the number of posts containing those words both as a joke and a protest against Bueno.

International reaction from non-Brazilians was generally confusing, with first hoaxes claiming it was a movement to save a Brazilian bird mostly because of the similarity between the words Galvão and "Gavião", Portuguese for hawk. A fake Twitter account named galvaoinstitute was set up as a joke for non-Portuguese speakers to repeat the sentence "CALA BOCA GALVÃO", claiming US$0.10 would be donated to save the bird each time those words were replied. Later, a YouTube video was uploaded in order to support the hoax. A second wave of jokes started when Brazilian users claimed "Cala Boca Galvão" was a new single by Lady Gaga aimed at saving those birds. Some Brazilian websites added lyrics of the fake song, which repeats "Cala a boca Galvão" in a way similar to the chorus of Gaga's song "Alejandro" mixed with lines about saving birds. Brazilian writer Paulo Coelho played another joke by claiming that "CALA BOCA GALVÃO" was a homeopathic medicine also known as "SILENTIUM GALVANUS", making a reference for the commentator to stay quiet.

On 13 June 2010, the hoax gained magnificent proportions when Brazilian Twitter users started tweeting messages containing the expression "CALA BOCA GALVÃO" along with the name of several Brazilian personalities such as Gisele Bündchen, Diogo Nogueira, Ana Maria Braga and Fernanda Souza. The expression "Pobres Australianos" ("Poor Australians" in Portuguese, as a reference to the 4-0 defeat to Germany in the World Cup) was also added to the hoax when Brazilians claimed it was another single by Lady Gaga aimed at saving the fictional Galvão bird. At 01:20 UTC on 14 June 2010, the top 7 Global Trending topics on Twitter referred to the Cala a boca Galvão meme, topping expressions related to the World Cup and NBA Finals which were happening at that time. Brazilian Twitter users soon began spreading another tweet which reads "CALA BOCA GALVÃO is the biggest inside joke in history. A whole country [Brazil] is laughing and the rest of the world doesn't understand anything." This last tweet, re-tweeted by Brazilians, helped to keep the meme active and on the top of the Trending Topics. The global proportion of this hoax resulted in articles written all over the world, in several different languages, explaining the joke played by Brazilians from blogs to El País and The New York Times. Wikipedia itself was also included in the hoax when pages Galvao bird and Cala-boca-galvao were created to support the fictional bird Galvão. The two articles were promptly deleted. The increased number of Internet users interested in the expression also resulted in an increased popularity of Flash-based minigames aimed at "shutting up" the character representing Galvão Bueno. Even Jimmy Wales, co-founder and promoter of Wikipedia, quoted the internet meme during his summit at info@trends, in São Paulo.

During Brazil's first match in the World Cup, against North Korea, a banner displaying "CALA BOCA GALVÃO!" could be seen in the first minutes of the game, and was caught by the official broadcasting before quickly being removed from view.
