= Cláudio Ricci =

Brazilian racing driver (born 1971)

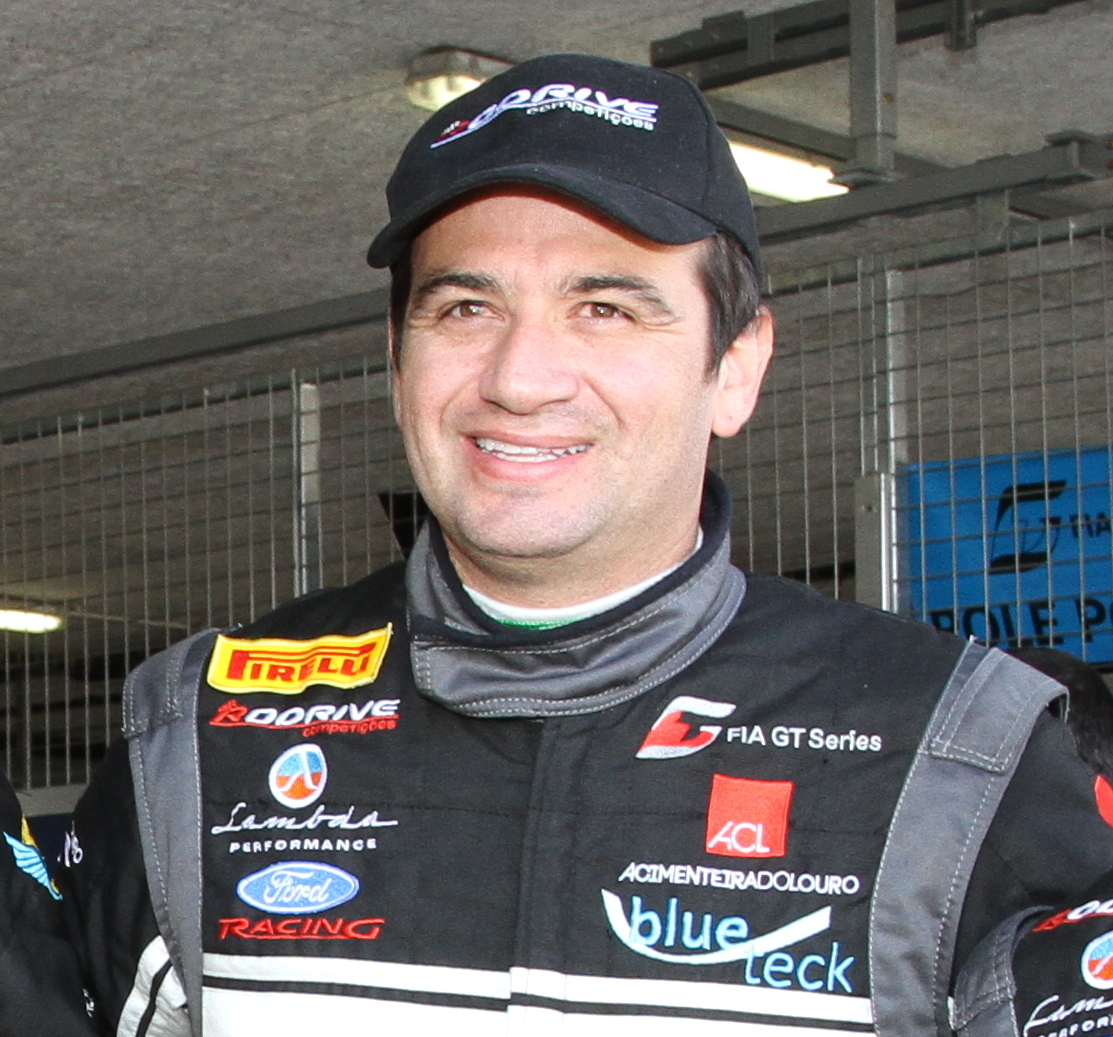
- Nationality: (Brazil) Brazilian
- Born: July 2, 1971 (age 55) Passo Fundo (Brazil)

Stock Car Brasil career
- Debut season: 2002
- Current team: Bassani Racing
- Categorisation: FIA Gold (until 2011); FIA Silver (2012–2019)
- Car number: 30
- Starts: 24
- Wins: 0
- Poles: 0
- Fastest laps: 1
- Best finish: 25th in 2010

Championship titles
- 2006 2009 2022: Pick Up Racing Brasil; GT3 Brasil Championship; Império Endurance Brasil

Cláudio Ricci (born July 2, 1971, in Passo Fundo) is a Brazilian racing driver. Ricci participate in some races of Stock Car Brasil, the major South American motorsports series and FIA GT3 European Championship. He won the Pick-Up Racing in 2006 and GT3 Brasil Championship in 2009. Ricci is the 2022 Império Endurance Brasil champion in the P1 class.

== Racing record ==
=== Stock Car Brasil results ===
Year	Team	Car	1	2	3	4	5	6	7	8	9	10	11	12	Rank	Points
2002	RS Competições	Chevrolet Vectra	RIO	CTB	INT	LON	CGD	INT	RIO	GUA; Ret	BSB	CTB	LON	INT	NC	0
2006	RS Competições	Volkswagen Bora	INT	CTB	CGD	INT	LON	CTB	SCZ; 16	BSB	TAR; 16	ARG	RIO	INT	NC	0
2007	RS Competições	Volkswagen Bora	INT	CTB	CGD	INT	LON	SCZ	CTB	BSB	ARG; DNQ	TAR; DNQ	RIO; Ret	INT; DNQ	NC	0
2010	Amir Nasr Racing	Peugeot 307	INT; 22	CTB; 17	VEL; 11	RIO; 12	RBP; 11	SAL; 20	INT; 10	CGD; 20	LON; Ret	SCZ; Ret	BSB; 21	CTB; 14	25th	22
2011	RZ Motorsport	Chevrolet Vectra	CTB; 17	INT; Ret	RBP; 17	VEL; 13	CGD	RIO	INT	SAL	SCZ	LON	BSB	VEL	28th	3
2012	RC3 Bassani	Peugeot 408	INT	CTB	VEL	RBP	LON	RIO	SAL	CAS; Ret	TAR; 26	CTB	BSB	INT	NC	0

=== FIA GT Series results ===
Year	Team	Car	Class	1	2	3	4	5	6	7	8	9	10	11	12	Pos.	Points
2013	Rodrive Competiçöes	Ford	Pro-Am	NOG; QR; 9	NOG; CR; 15	ZOL; QR; 14	ZOL; CR; Ret	ZAN; QR	ZAN; QR	SVK; QR	SVK; CR	NAV; QR	NAV; CR	TBA; QR	TBA; CR	17th	18
