= Campeonato Sudamericano de GT =

Sports car racing series based in Brazil

- Category: Grand tourer
- Country: South American
- Inaugural season: 2007
- Folded: 2013
- Tyre suppliers: Pirelli
- Last Drivers' champion: GT3 Pro-Am: (São Paulo (state)) Marcelo Hahn; GT3 GTR: (Rio Grande do Sul) Cristiano de Almeida (Rio Grande do Sul) Pierre Ventura; GT4: (São Paulo (state)) Eduardo Oliveira (São Paulo (state)) William Freire
- Official website: www.portalgt.com.br

Campeonato Sudamericano de GT (Southamerican GT Championship) previously known as GT3 Brasil Championship, GT Brasil and Campeonato Brasileiro de GT was a sports car racing series based in Brazil organized by the SRO Latin America.

== History ==
Starting in 2007, the GT3 Brasil Championship has been held in Brazil, also organized by SRO, with several veteran drivers racing in some events, such as former Formula One champions Emerson Fittipaldi and former Brazilian Stock Car champions Chico Serra and Ingo Hoffmann. Differently from the European series, GT3 Brasil accepts professional drivers, in a system where drivers are graded from A (International Driver) to D (Fully Amateur).

In 2010 the championship was renamed for GT Brasil and announced the creation of GT4 class. For 2012 season was introduce GT Premium class caters for older, such as the Dodge Viper Competition Coupe or Porsche 997 GT3 Cup S. The category losing the primary sponsor and change their name to Campeonato Brasileiro de GT. In 2013 the series became a South American championship.

== Vehicles ==
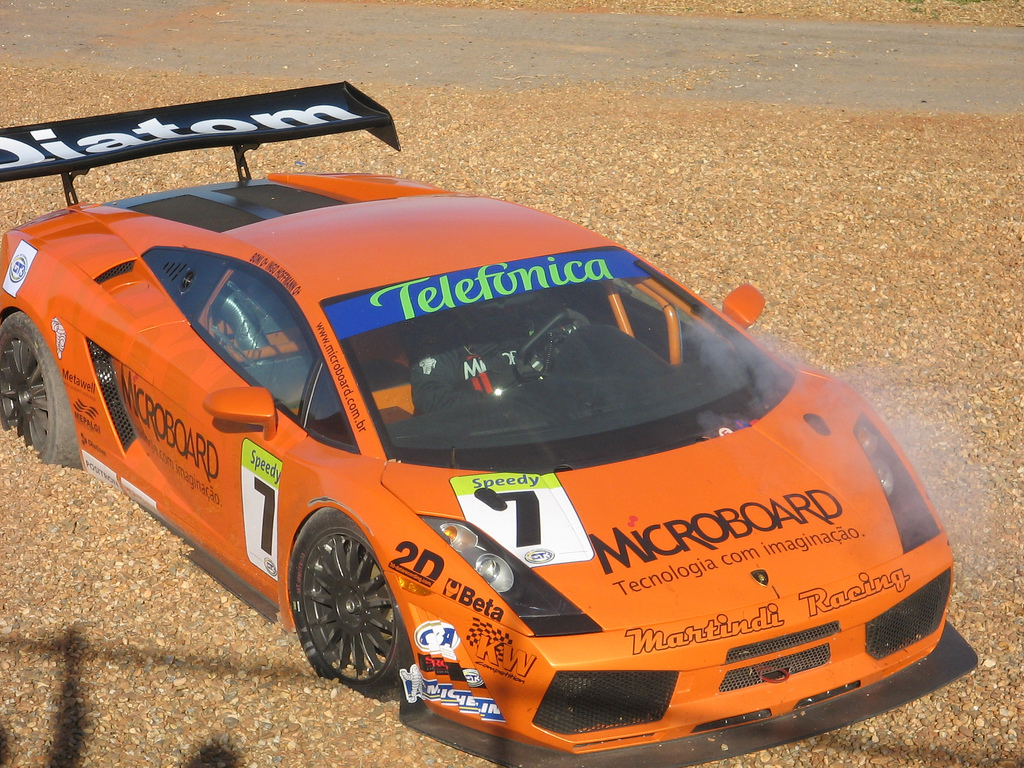
Lamborghini Gallardo driven by Ingo Hoffmann and Paulo Bonifácio in the gravel.

The following chassis are currently in GT3 and GT Premium:

- Audi R8 LMS ultra
- Corvette Z06-R GT3
- Ferrari F430 GT3
- Lamborghini Gallardo LP520 GT3
- Lamborghini Gallardo LP560 GT3
- Lamborghini Gallardo LP600+ GT3
- Porsche 997 GT3 Cup S
- Porsche 991 GT3 Cup

GT4:

- Aston Martin V8 Vantage GT4
- Ferrari Challenge
- Lotus Evora GT4
- Maserati GranTurismo MC

== Champions ==
Season	Class	Driver	Car
2007	GT3	(Rio de Janeiro (state)) Andreas Mattheis (São Paulo (state)) Xandy Negrão	Dodge Viper Competition Coupe; Lamborghini Gallardo GT3
2008	GT3	(Rio de Janeiro (state)) Andreas Mattheis (São Paulo (state)) Xandy Negrão	Dodge Viper Competition Coupe; Ford GT GT3
2009	GT3	(São Paulo (state)) Rafael Derani (Rio Grande do Sul) Cláudio Ricci	Ferrari F430 GT3
2010	GT3	(Rio Grande do Sul) Mateus Stumpf (Paraíba) Valdeno Brito	Ford GT GT3
2010	GT4	(São Paulo (state)) Valter Rossete	Maserati Trofeo; Ferrari Challenge
2011	GT3	(Rio Grande do Sul) Mateus Stumpf (Paraíba) Valdeno Brito	Ford GT GT3
2011	GT4	(São Paulo (state)) Cristiano Federico (São Paulo (state)) Caio Lara	Ferrari Challenge; Aston Martin V8 Vantage GT4
2012	GT3	(São Paulo (state)) Cleber Faria (Rio Grande do Sul) Duda Rosa	Mercedes-Benz SLS AMG GT3
2012	GTP	(Rio Grande do Sul) Carlos Kray (Rio Grande do Sul) Andersom Toso	Lamborghini Gallardo LP520 GT3
2012	GT4	(São Paulo (state)) Sergio Laganá (São Paulo (state)) Alan Hellmeister	Aston Martin V8 Vantage GT4
2013	GT3 Pro-Am	(São Paulo (state)) Marcelo Hahn	Lamborghini Gallardo LP600+ GT3
2013	GT3 GTR	(Rio Grande do Sul) Cristiano de Almeida (Rio Grande do Sul) Pierre Ventura	Lamborghini Gallardo LP520 GT3
2013	GT4	(São Paulo (state)) Eduardo Oliveira (São Paulo (state)) William Freire	Ferrari Challenge

== See also ==
- FIA GT3 European Championship
- GT4 European Cup
