= AH Competições =

Brazilian auto racing team

(Brazil) AH Competições
- Founded: 1996
- Team principal(s): Antonio Hermann; Washington Bezerra
- Current series: FIA GT Series
- Former series: Stock Car Brasil; Stock Car Light; Brazilian GT Championship
- Teams' Championships: 2009 GT3 Brasil; 2010 GT3 Brasil; 2011 GT3 Brasil
- Drivers' Championships: 1997 Stock Car Light (Bueno); 1999 Stock Car Light (Netto); 1999 Stock Car Brasil (Serra); 2000 Stock Car Brasil (Serra); 2001 Stock Car Brasil (Serra) 2010 GT3 Brasil (Stumpf)(Brito); 2011 GT3 Brasil (Stumpf)(Brito)

AH Competições (previously known as WB Motorsport) was a Brazilian auto racing team founded in 1996 by Stock Car Brasil co-founder Washington Bezerra and former racing driver Wilson Fittipaldi. The team won the championship in Stock Car Brasil, Stock Car Light and Brazilian GT Championship. In 2010 the team was renamed for AH Competições with former racing driver Antonio Hermann became the team owner alongside Bezerra. In 2013 the team joined FIA GT Series with BMW under the name BMW Sports Trophy Team Brasil.
