= Mário Haberfeld =

Brazilian racing driver

Mario Haberfeld
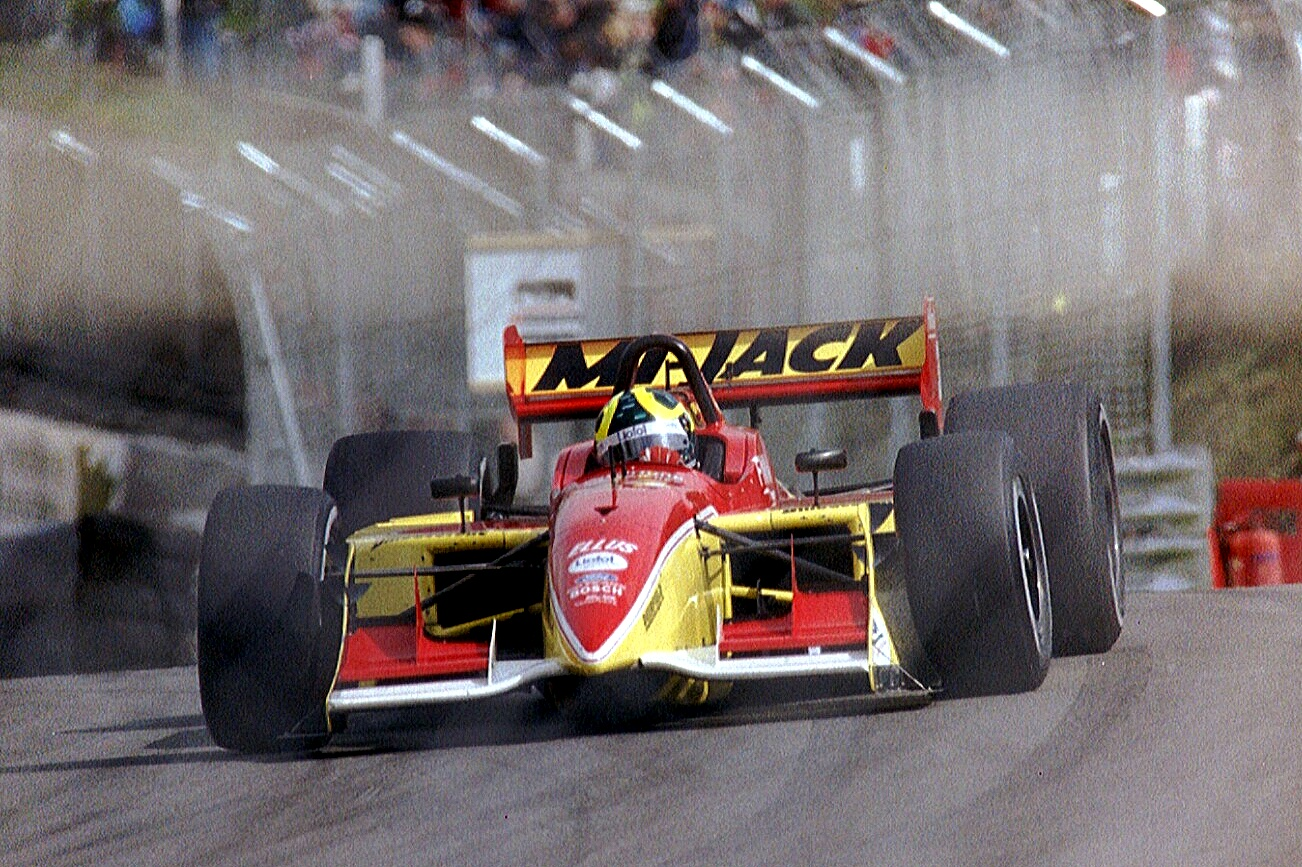
- Haberfeld competing at Brands Hatch in 2003.
- Born: Mario Bührke Haberfeld; January 25, 1976 (age 50) São Paulo, Brazil
- Teams: West Competition, Fortec Motorsport, Super Nova Racing, Team Astromega, Conquest Racing, Walker Racing, Fernández Racing, Embassy Racing, ZEG iCarros Jaguar Brazil

Championship titles
- 1998 British Formula Three Champion

Mario Bührke Haberfeld (born January 25, 1976, in São Paulo) is a Brazilian former racing driver.

== Racing career ==
After winning the British Formula 3 Championship in 1998, Haberfeld drove in Formula 3000 from 1999 until 2002. He posted some decent results but struggled his first season driving for the McLaren junior team failing to score a single point while teammate Nick Heidfeld won the series championship.

Haberfeld also tested for a number of Formula One teams, including Stewart Grand Prix in 1998, McLaren in 1999, and Jordan in 2001.

In 2003, Haberfeld moved to the Champ Car World Series driving for Mi-Jack Conquest Racing. His team shared information with a fellow rookie team driving a Reynard chassis, Emerson Fittipaldi's team with future F1 driver Tiago Monteiro. He scored a best finish of fourth on his first start in St. Petersburg. In 2004, he was a field-filler driving the lone Reynard in the series for Derrick Walker, but proved his worth with another pair of top-five finishes No one picked Haberfeld up for 2005, but he drove a few Grand-Am races for Tuttle Team Racing at the end of the year. He then drove in the Rolex Grand Am series for Adrian Fernández who was also his teammate.

In 2019, Haberfeld raced in the Jaguar I-Pace eTrophy, for Jaguar Brazil Racing, temporarily replacing Cacá Bueno.

== Personal life ==
Haberfeld is a conservationist and the founder of Onçafari, an organization dedicated to wildlife conservation and habitat protection in Brazil. Since 2011, he has been at the forefront of jaguar conservation, rewilding programs, ecotourism activities, and scientific research, working to preserve Brazil’s natural ecosystems. Under his leadership, Onçafari has expanded from its origins in the Pantanal to multiple biomes, including the Cerrado, Atlantic Forest and Amazon, implementing fire prevention programs, community engagement projects, and biodiversity monitoring. His efforts have promoted sustainable ecotourism, contributed to the expansion of protected areas, and led to the successful reintroduction of jaguars and many other species into the wild.

Haberfeld collaborates with government agencies, private landowners, and global conservation organizations, advocating for wildlife-friendly economic models that integrate conservation with local community development. His work has positioned Onçafari as a leading conservation initiative in Brazil, influencing policy discussions on biodiversity, habitat restoration, and fire mitigation.

== Racing record ==
=== Career summary ===
Season	Series	Team	Races	Wins	Poles	F.Laps	Podiums	Points	Position
1994	Formula Ford Festival	Andy Welch Racing	1	0	0	0	0	0	9th
1995	British Formula Ford Championship	Manor Motorsport	16	3	3	3	9	99	4th
1995	Formula Ford Festival	Manor Motorsport	1	0	0	0	1	0	**3rd**
1996	Eurocup Formula Renault	Manor Motorsport	?	1	?	?	3	88	5th
1996	Championnat de France Formule Renault	?	4	0	0	0	0	0	NC
1997	British Formula Three Championship	Martin Donnelly Racing	15	2	1	0	3	108	6th
1997	Macau Grand Prix	Martin Donnelly Racing	1	0	0	0	0	0	NC
1997	Masters of Formula 3	Martin Donnelly Racing	1	0	0	0	0	0	12th
1998	British Formula Three Championship	Paul Stewart Racing	16	6	5	4	11	218	**1st**
1998	Masters of Formula 3	Paul Stewart Racing	1	0	0	0	1	0	**3rd**
1999	International Formula 3000	West Competition	6	0	0	0	0	0	NC
1999	Formula One	West McLaren Mercedes	Test Driver						
2000	International Formula 3000	Fortec Motorsport	7	0	0	0	0	0	NC
2001	International Formula 3000	Super Nova Racing	12	0	0	0	0	3	15th
2002	International Formula 3000	Team Astromega	12	0	0	0	2	19	7th
2003	Champ Car World Series	Conquest Racing	18	0	0	1	0	71	12th
2004	Champ Car World Series	Walker Racing	14	0	0	0	0	157	13th
2006	Rolex Sports Car Series	Fernández Racing	14	1	0	0	2	332	13th
2007	Le Mans Series - LMP2	Embassy Racing	1	0	0	0	1	0	NC
2008	Le Mans Series - LMP2	Embassy Racing	2	0	0	0	0	1	19th
2019–20	Jaguar I-Pace eTrophy	ZEG iCarros Jaguar Brazil	2	0	0	0	0	16	8th

=== Complete British Formula Three Championship results ===
(key) (Races in bold indicate pole position; races in italics indicate fastest lap.)

Year	Entrant	Chassis	Engine	Class	1	2	3	4	5	6	7	8	9	10	11	12	13	14	15	16	DC	Points
1997	Martin Donnelly Racing	Dallara F397	Opel	A	DON; 9	SIL; Ret	THR; 7	BRH; 5	SIL; 3	CRO; 11	OUL; 5	SIL; 1	PEM; Ret	PEM; 4	DON; Ret	**SNE**; 1	SNE; 7	SPA; 7	SIL; 21	THR; 5	6th	108
1998	Stewart Racing	Dallara F398	Mugen-Honda	A	DON; 4	THR; 4	SIL; 1	**BRH**; 3	**BRH**; Ret	OUL; Ret	SIL; 3	**CRO**; 1	SNE; 2	SIL; 5	**PEM**; 1	PEM; 2	**DON**; 3	THR; 1	SPA; 1	SIL; 1	1st	218

=== Complete International Formula 3000 results ===
(key) (Races in bold indicate pole position; races in italics indicate fastest lap.)

Year	Entrant	1	2	3	4	5	6	7	8	9	10	11	12	DC	Points
1999	West Competition	IMO; DNQ	MON; DNQ	CAT; Ret	MAG; Ret	SIL; 18	A1R; Ret	HOC; 14	HUN; DNQ	SPA; DNQ	MNZ; DNQ			NC	0
2000	Fortec Motorsport	IMO; 10	SIL; 17	CAT; DNS	NUR	MON	MAG; 11	A1R; 8	HOC; 9	HUN; 15	SPA; Ret			NC	0
2001	Super Nova Racing	INT; Ret	IMO; Ret	CAT; 4	A1R; Ret	MON; Ret	NUR; Ret	MAG; 7	SIL; 15	HOC; Ret	HUN; Ret	SPA; 19	MNZ; 13	15th	3
2002	Team Astromega	INT; 2	IMO; Ret	CAT; 5	A1R; 3	MON; 6	NUR; Ret	SIL; Ret	MAG; 5	HOC; 4	HUN; Ret	SPA; 14	MNZ; 9	7th	18

=== Complete Champ Car World Series results ===
(key)

Year	Team	No.	Chassis	Engine	1	2	3	4	5	6	7	8	9	10	11	12	13	14	15	16	17	18	19	Rank	Points	Ref
2003	Mi-Jack Conquest Racing	34	Reynard 02i	Ford XFE V8t	STP; 4	MTY; 16	LBH; 9	BRH; 9	LAU; 14	MIL; 7	LS; 5	POR; 8	CLE; 15	TOR; 19	VAN; 7	ROA; 8	MDO; 10	MTL; 11	DEN; 10	MIA; 5	MXC; 12	SRF; 14	FON; NH	**12th**	**71**	
2004	Walker Racing	5	Reynard 02i	Ford XFE V8t	LBH; 9	MTY; 15	MIL; 10	POR; 9	CLE; 14	TOR; 4	VAN; 9	ROA; 11	DEN; 8	MTL; 13	LS; 7	LVG; 14	SRF; 14	MXC; 15						**13th**	**157**^	

- ^ New points system implemented in 2004

=== Complete Jaguar I-Pace eTrophy results ===
(key) (Races in bold indicate pole position)

Year	Team	Car	Class	1	2	3	4	5	6	7	8	9	10	D.C.	Points
2019–20	ZEG iCarros Jaguar Brazil	Jaguar I-PACE eTROPHY	P	ADR; 8^{4}	ADR; 7^{4}	MEX	BER	BER	BER	BER	BER	BER	BER	8th	16

Recognitions and Awards

- 2024: Onçafari was recognized as one of Brazil’s Top 100 NGOs
- 2024: Onçafari was recognized by Condé Nast Traveler’s Bright Ideas in Travel 2024

Books

- **Alma Selvagem / Wild Soul** (Portuguese/English, 2011) – A book by Mario Haberfeld featuring stunning wildlife photography and insights into Brazil’s biodiversity and conservation efforts. Written by Mario Haberfeld and Laís Duarte.
- **A Onça na Cultura Pantaneira (2017)** – A book exploring the cultural significance of the jaguar in the Pantanal region, written by Mario Haberfeld, Adriano Gambarini and Laís Duarte.
- Panthera Onca: À Sombra das Florestas / In the shadow of the forests - This book aims to gather information of all kinds about the jaguar in the interior of Brazil. Written by Mario Haberfeld, Adriano Gambarini and Laís Duarte.

Documentaries

- **BBC – Jaguar Brazil’s Super Cats** (2016-2017) – A pioneering team attempts to re-wild two orphan jaguar cubs in the heart of Brazil.
- **BBC - Planet Earth III - Episode 3: Deserts & Grasslands** (2023)
- **Jaguar - Closer than you ever thought possible / WCP** - A wildlife documentary that records the unprecedented process of “habituation” of jaguars in the Brazilian Pantanal, a procedure that will bring humans face to face with untamed beasts.
- **Diary of a Jaguar**
- Cerrado: Life on the Edge (Upcoming) – A documentary addressing habitat destruction in the Cerrado, where Haberfeld serves as a co-producer.

Articles

- Revista da Gol: O HOMEM ONÇA A história de MARIO HABERFELD, ex-piloto de automobilismo que transformou a preservação da onça-pintada em propósito de vida
- Revista Unquiet: Para o ambientalista brasileiro, criador do projeto Onçafari, uma das melhores maneiras de preservação do meio-ambiente é o ecoturismo
- Folha de SP: Campeão do automobilismo vira guardião das onças - Turismo
- Forbes: Incêndio devastador consome o Pantanal e o Onçafari pede ajuda
- **Forbes**: Safári brasileiro: as aventuras do Refúgio Ecológico Caiman
- Terra: ONG de ex-piloto de F1 atua na preservação de onças e combate a incêndios no Pantanal
- Revista United Hemispheres: Big Cat ComeBack
- **Antilophia** **- Saving the Species**: Jaguar Conservationist Mario Haberfeld **Talks and Interviews**
- TED TALK:The Race Against Time
- **TV Conversa com Bial (entrevista** **- parte 1)**
- **TV Conversa com Bial (entrevista - parte** **2)**
- CNN Brasil (TV): CEO da Onçafari à CNN: Recuperação da fauna do Pantanal depende das cheias

Sporting positions
Preceded by Jonny Kane	British Formula Three Champion; 1998	Succeeded by Marc Hynes
