= 2019–20 NZ Touring Cars Championship =

The 2019–20 NZ Touring Cars Championship (known for commercial reasons as the 2019–20 BNT V8s Championship) was the twenty-first season of the series, and the fifth under the [NZ Touring Cars name. The field consisted of three classes racing on the same grid. Class one featured both V8ST and NZV8 TLX cars. Class two consisted of older NZV8 TL cars. There was also a third class run for vehicles ineligible for points.

Andre Heimgartner dominated the season to take his second New Zealand V8 Touring Car Championship. Justin McIlroy meanwhile would take the V8 Lites honours. The series was disrupted by the COVID-19 pandemic and forced the cancellation of the final two rounds at Hampton Downs Motorsport Park and Pukekohe Park Raceway.

== Race calendar ==
Rnd	Circuit	Date	Map
2019			2019–20 NZ Touring Cars Championship is located in New Zealand
NC	Pukekohe Park Raceway (Pukekohe, Auckland Region)	14–15 September	2019–20 NZ Touring Cars Championship is located in New Zealand
1	Pukekohe Park Raceway (Pukekohe, Auckland Region)	30 November–1 December	2019–20 NZ Touring Cars Championship is located in New Zealand
2020			2019–20 NZ Touring Cars Championship is located in New Zealand
2	Pukekohe Park Raceway (Pukekohe, Auckland Region)	8–9 February	2019–20 NZ Touring Cars Championship is located in New Zealand
3	Manfeild: Circuit Chris Amon (Feilding, Manawatū District)	15–16 February	2019–20 NZ Touring Cars Championship is located in New Zealand
C	~~Hampton Downs Motorsport Park~~; ~~(Hampton Downs, Waikato)~~	~~28–29 March~~	2019–20 NZ Touring Cars Championship is located in New Zealand
C	~~Pukekohe Park Raceway~~; ~~(Pukekohe, Auckland Region)~~	~~25–26 April~~	2019–20 NZ Touring Cars Championship is located in New Zealand

== Teams and drivers ==
All teams are based and registered in New Zealand.

Manufacturer	Vehicle	Team	No	Drivers	Rounds
Ford	Falcon (FG)	Phillips Motorsport	43	(New Zealand) Brayden Phillips	All
Ford	Falcon (FG)	Lathrope Racing	73	(New Zealand) Brad Lathrope	All
Holden	Commodore (VE)	Rob Wallace Racing	51	(New Zealand) Rob Wallace	All
Holden	Commodore (VE)	Hamilton Motorsports	84	(New Zealand) Lance Hughes	All
Holden	Commodore (VE)	Hamilton Motorsports	85	(New Zealand) Andre Heimgartner	All
Nissan	Altima (L33)	Concept Motorsport	007	(New Zealand) Nick Ross	All
Toyota	Camry (XV50)	Richards Team Motorsport	6	(Australia) Alexandra Whitley	All
V8 Lites
Ford	Falcon (BF)	Thirsty Liquor	18	(New Zealand) Shane Whitley	1, 3
Ford	Falcon (BF)	Brock Timperley Racing	59	(New Zealand) Brock Timperley	3
Ford	Falcon (BF)		80	(New Zealand) Tony Rutherford	1
Ford	Falcon (BF)	Nigel Karl Racing	172	(New Zealand) Nigel Karl	1
Holden	Commodore (VZ)	Precision Concrete & Paving	25	(New Zealand) Justin McIlroy	All
Holden	Commodore (VZ)		30	(New Zealand) Murray Brook	1
Holden	Commodore (VZ)		82	(New Zealand) Ted Jarvis	1
Open
Holden	Commodore (VE)	McDonald Kerbing Specialist	50	(New Zealand) Blair McDonald	All
Holden	Commodore (VE)	4H Investments- Auto Garage	57	(New Zealand) Eric Hennephof	1–2
Ford	Ford Mustang (S550(	Collins Motorsport	77	(New Zealand) Sam Collins	All

=== Driver changes ===
Andre Heimgartner returned to the series to drive with Hamilton Motorsports. Chelsea Herbert was originally slated to drive with the team, but withdrew after announcing her plans to compete in the Toyota Racing Series.

== Results and standings ==
=== Season summary ===
The calendar was announced on April 30, 2019. The calendar was later revised, removing the South Island rounds citing issues surrounding cost.

Round		Circuit	Pole position	Fastest lap	Winning driver	V8 Lites Winner	Open Winner
2019
NC	R1	Pukekohe Park Raceway; Pukekohe, Auckland Region	(New Zealand) Nick Chester	(New Zealand) Simon Evans	(New Zealand) Nick Chester	Field combined for non-championship round	
NC	R2	Pukekohe Park Raceway; Pukekohe, Auckland Region		(New Zealand) Simon Evans	(New Zealand) Nick Chester	Field combined for non-championship round	
NC	R3	Pukekohe Park Raceway; Pukekohe, Auckland Region		(New Zealand) Simon Evans	(New Zealand) Nick Chester	Field combined for non-championship round	
1	R1	Pukekohe Park Raceway; Pukekohe, Auckland Region	(New Zealand) Andre Heimgartner	(New Zealand) Andre Heimgartner	(New Zealand) Andre Heimgartner	(New Zealand) Shayne Whitley	(New Zealand) Sam Collins
1	R2	Pukekohe Park Raceway; Pukekohe, Auckland Region		(New Zealand) Nick Ross	(New Zealand) Andre Heimgartner	(New Zealand) Justin McIlroy	(New Zealand) Sam Collins
1	R3	Pukekohe Park Raceway; Pukekohe, Auckland Region	Race abandoned due to adverse weather conditions.				
2020
2	R1	Pukekohe Park Raceway; Pukekohe, Auckland Region	(New Zealand) Andre Heimgartner	(New Zealand) Andre Heimgartner	(New Zealand) Andre Heimgartner	(New Zealand) Justin McIlroy	(New Zealand) Sam Collins
2	R2	Pukekohe Park Raceway; Pukekohe, Auckland Region		(New Zealand) Andre Heimgartner	(New Zealand) Andre Heimgartner	(New Zealand) Justin McIlroy	(New Zealand) Sam Collins
2	R3	Pukekohe Park Raceway; Pukekohe, Auckland Region		(New Zealand) Andre Heimgartner	(New Zealand) Andre Heimgartner	(New Zealand) Justin McIlroy	(New Zealand) Sam Collins
3	R1	Manfeild: Circuit Chris Amon; Feilding, Manawatū District	(New Zealand) Andre Heimgartner	(New Zealand) Andre Heimgartner	(New Zealand) Andre Heimgartner	(New Zealand) Brock Timperley	(New Zealand) Sam Collins
3	R2	Manfeild: Circuit Chris Amon; Feilding, Manawatū District		(New Zealand) Andre Heimgartner	(New Zealand) Andre Heimgartner	(New Zealand) Brock Timperley	(New Zealand) Sam Collins
3	R3	Manfeild: Circuit Chris Amon; Feilding, Manawatū District		(New Zealand) Andre Heimgartner	(New Zealand) Andre Heimgartner	(New Zealand) Brock Timperley	(New Zealand) Blair McDonald

=== Championship standings ===
Pos	Driver	PUK1			PUK2			PUK3			MAN			Pts
Pos	Driver	R1	R2	R3	R1	R2	R3	R1	R2	R3	R1	R2	R3	Pts
1	(New Zealand) Andre Heimgartner				1	1	C	2	1	1	1	1	1	525
2	(Australia) Alexandra Whitley				5	5	C	4	3	4	10	6	5	420
3	(New Zealand) Brad Lathrope	7	7	7	6	6	C	6	5	6	5	10	6	375
4	(New Zealand) Lance Hughes	3	4	12	3	DNS	C	Ret	4	5	3	3	2	321
5	(New Zealand) Robert Wallace	8	6	8	7	7	C	5	6	7	6	Ret	9	310
6	(New Zealand) Brayden Phillips	Ret	10	9	8	8	C	Ret	7	8	Ret	7	7	229
7	(New Zealand) Nick Ross	5	3	6	DNS	2	C	Ret	Wth	Wth	7	5	4	176
V8 Lites
1	(New Zealand) Justin McIlroy				12	9	C	9	10	11	9	9	11	269
2	(New Zealand) Brock Timperley										8	8	10	150
3	(New Zealand) Shane Whitley				10	11	C				Ret	Wth	Wth	142
4	(New Zealand) Nigel Karl	13	Ret	11	11	DNS	C							67
5	(New Zealand) Tony Rutherford				13	Ret	C							54
6	(New Zealand) Murray Brook													0
7	(New Zealand) Ted Jarvis				Ret	Ret	C							0
Open
-	(New Zealand) Nick Chester	1	1	1										0
-	(New Zealand) Simon Evans	2	2	2										0
-	(New Zealand) Sam Collins				2	3	C	1	2	2	2	2	8	0
-	(New Zealand) Blair McDonald				4	4	C	3	Ret	3	4	4	3	0
-	(New Zealand) Eric Hennephof				9	10	C	7	8	10				0
-	(New Zealand) Grant Hannah							8	9	9				0
-	(New Zealand) Paul Radisich	9	5	3										0
-	(New Zealand) Shaun Varney	6	Ret	Ret										0
-	(New Zealand) Ken Hunter										DNS	Wth	Wth	0
Pos	Driver	R1	R2	R3	R1	R2	R3	R1	R2	R3	R1	R2	R3	Pts
Pos	Driver	PUK1			PUK2			PUK3			MAN			Pts
