= Tempelhof Airport Street Circuit =

Street circuit at the Berlin Tempelhof Airport, Berlin, Germany

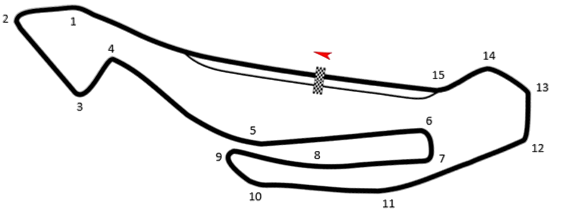
- Formula E Circuit (2024–present)
- Location: Tempelhof Airport, Berlin, Germany
- Coordinates: 52°28′25″N 13°24′06″E
- FIA Grade: 3E
- Opened: 23 May 2015; 11 years ago
- Major events: Current: Formula E Berlin ePrix (2015, 2017–present); Former: Jaguar I-Pace eTrophy (2019–2020)
- Website: http://www.autosport.com/fe/news/128065/formula-e-to-return-to-berlin-tempelhof, http://www.fia.com/news/fia-formula-e-returns-racing-six-races-row-berlin

Formula E Circuit (2024–present)
- Length: 2.343 km (1.456 mi)
- Turns: 15
- Race lap record: 0:58.648 ( (Germany) Pascal Wehrlein, Porsche 99X Electric, 2026, F-E)

Formula E Circuit (2017–2023)
- Length: 2.355 km (1.463 mi)
- Turns: 10
- Race lap record: 1:06.604 ( (United Kingdom) Jake Dennis, Porsche 99X Electric, 2023, F-E)

Reverse Formula E Circuit (2020–2022)
- Length: 2.355 km (1.463 mi)
- Turns: 10
- Race lap record: 1:07.849 ( (New Zealand) Nick Cassidy, Audi e-Tron FE07, 2022, F-E)

Extended Formula E Circuit (2020)
- Length: 2.505 km (1.557 mi)
- Turns: 16
- Race lap record: 1:17.232 ( (Brazil) Lucas di Grassi, Audi e-tron FE06, 2020, F-E)

Original Formula E Circuit (2015)
- Length: 2.469 km (1.534 mi)
- Turns: 17
- Race lap record: 1:24.435 ( (Brazil) Nelson Piquet Jr., Spark-Renault SRT 01E, 2015, F-E)

The Tempelhof Airport Street Circuit is a street circuit located at the former Berlin Tempelhof Airport in Germany. It is home to the Formula E Berlin ePrix. It hosted its first race as round 8 of the 2014–15 Formula E season.

== History ==
=== Development ===
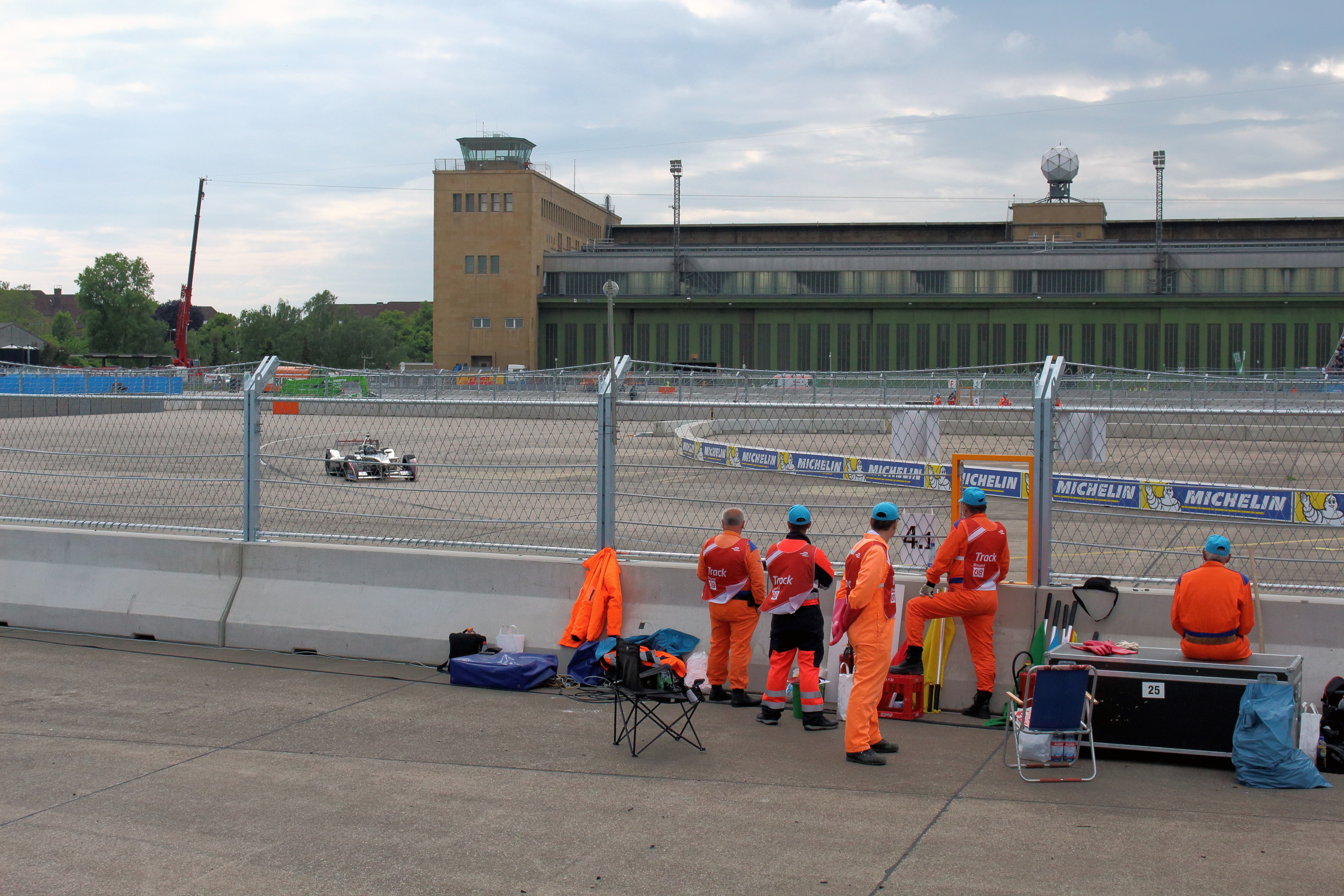
Part of the circuit with airport buildings in the background.

The 2.469 km (1.534 mi) anti-clockwise original track featured 17 turns and was designed by Rodrigo Nunes. Venturi driver Nick Heidfeld described the circuit as follows: "It looks like it’s going to be a very twisty and challenging circuit with 17 turns in under 2.5 km, and I think the fans are going to have great visibility wherever they are. Many corners are just followed by the next which also partly shows that overtaking will not be easy, on the other hand, with so many corners followed by each other it’s easier to mess up and make a small mistake and then maybe the driver behind can capitalise on this. The two longer straights will be best for overtaking and using the FanBoost. It will be crucial to get into a good rhythm to get plenty of laps in and to learn the track quickly. It will also be interesting to see how the circuit is built up as normally on a street circuit there is no run-off so and no room for mistakes but in Berlin it could be more open allowing a little more margin for error." The course runs under the canopy roof of the historic Tempelhof Airport terminal from turn 13 to turn 14 and then again during turn 17.

=== 2015 Berlin ePrix ===
The circuit first took place on 23 May 2015. It was initially won by Lucas di Grassi. However, a technical infringement discovered in post-race checks led to his disqualification, with the win being awarded to Dragon Racing driver Jérôme d'Ambrosio.

=== Temporary absence ===
Owing to the Tempelhof airport building's usage as a temporary refugee shelter, the Berlin ePrix was moved to the Berlin Street Circuit, a layout created specifically for Formula E along the Karl-Marx-Allee to the west of Alexanderplatz. The 2016-17 season calendar listed Berlin as a host city, but did not specify which circuit was to be used. In January 2017, it was confirmed that the race would return to Tempelhof.

=== 2017 Berlin ePrix ===
In March 2017, it was announced that the circuit layout was completely revamped. The circuit hosted the 2017 Berlin ePrix, which became a doubleheader round after the cancellation of the Brussels ePrix, which took place on the 10–11 June. The two races were won by Mahindra driver Felix Rosenqvist, his first in the series, and Renault-e.Dams driver Sébastien Buemi.

=== 2020 Berlin ePrix ===
After the 2019–20 season was temporarily suspended and several rounds were cancelled due to the ongoing COVID-19 pandemic, the FIA announced that the season would conclude in early August with three double-header events in Tempelhof, using a different configuration of the circuit for each event. The first two races were held on August 5–6, 2020, on a reverse configuration of the track. The next two races took place on August 8–9, with the normal circuit being used. The third and final double header was held on August 12–13, on an extended version of the track featuring several more turns.

== Layout history ==
Tempelhof Airport Street Circuit layout history
Original Formula E Circuit (2015)

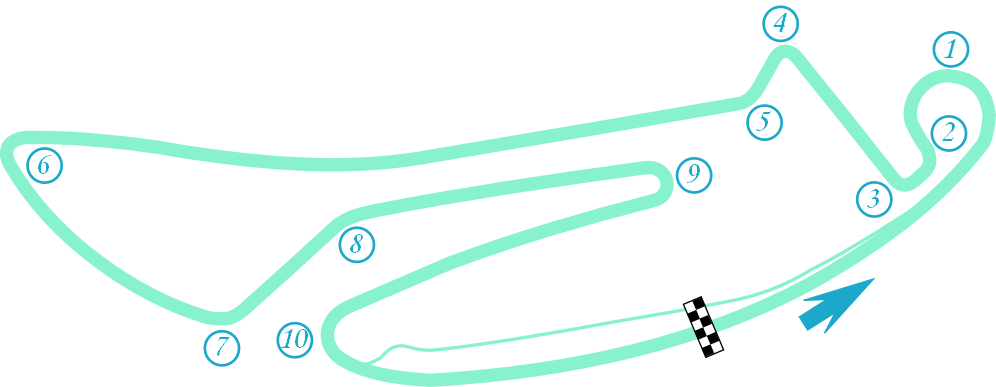
Formula E Circuit (2017–2023)

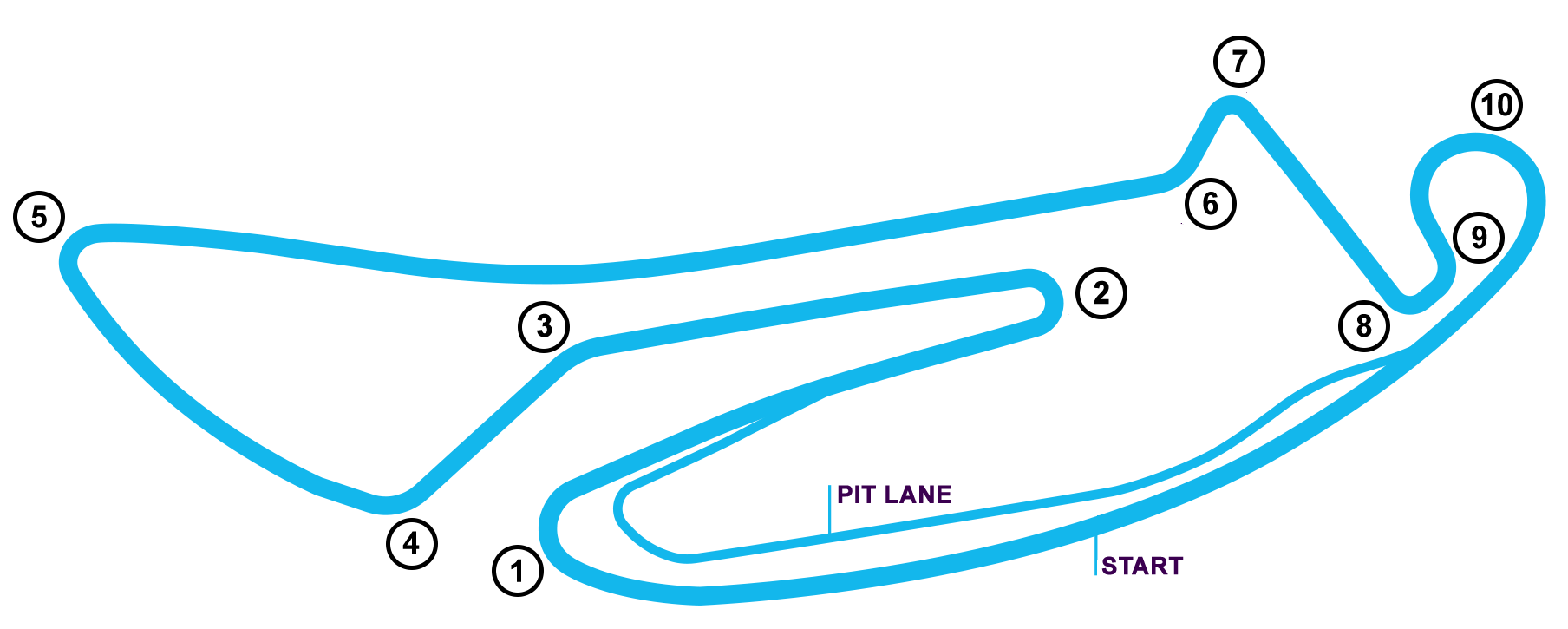
Reverse Formula E Circuit (2020–2022)

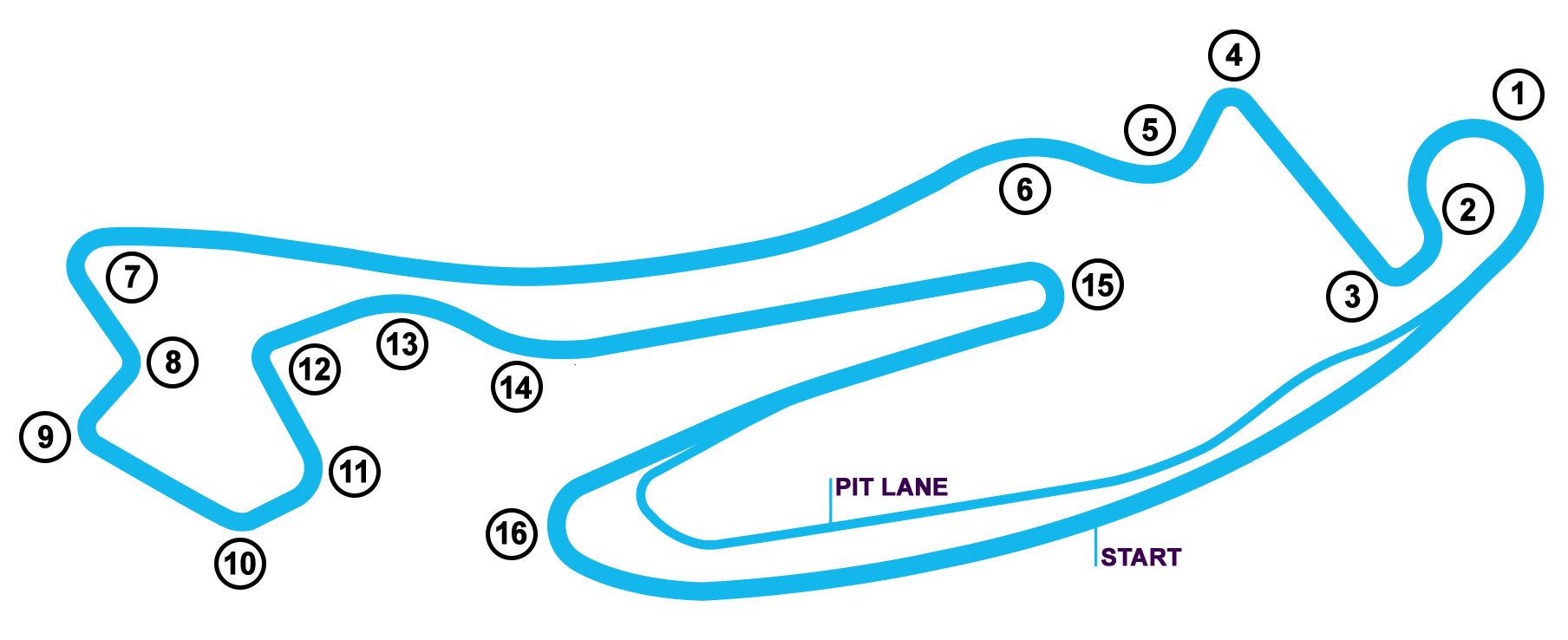
Extended Formula E Circuit (2020)

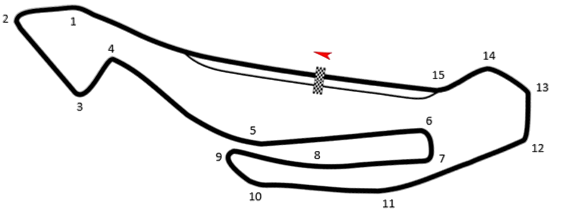
Formula E Circuit (2024–present)

== Lap records ==
As of May 2026, the fastest official race lap records at the Tempelhof Airport Street Circuit are listed as:

Category	Time	Driver	Vehicle	Event	Circuit Map
Formula E Circuit (2024–present): 2.343 km (1.456 mi)
Formula E	0:58.648	Pascal Wehrlein	Porsche 99X Electric	2026 Berlin ePrix	
Formula E Circuit (2017–2023): 2.355 km (1.463 mi)
Formula E	1:06.604	Jake Dennis	Porsche 99X Electric	2023 Berlin ePrix	
Jaguar I-Pace eTrophy	1:24.551	Gregory Segers	Jaguar I-Pace eTrophy car	2020 4th Berlin Jaguar I-Pace eTrophy round	
Reverse Formula E Circuit (2020–2022): 2.355 km (1.463 mi)
Formula E	1:07.849	Nick Cassidy	Audi e-Tron FE07	2022 Berlin ePrix	
Jaguar I-Pace eTrophy	1:24.367	Oliver Webb	Jaguar I-Pace eTrophy car	2020 2nd Berlin Jaguar I-Pace eTrophy round	
Extended Formula E Circuit (2020): 2.505 km (1.557 mi)
Formula E	1:17.232	Lucas di Grassi	Audi e-tron FE06	2020 Berlin ePrix	
Jaguar I-Pace eTrophy	1:35.107	Simon Evans	Jaguar I-Pace eTrophy car	2020 7th Berlin Jaguar I-Pace eTrophy round	
Original Formula E Circuit (2015): 2.469 km (1.534 mi)
Formula E	1:24.435	Nelson Piquet Jr.	Spark-Renault SRT_01E	2015 Berlin ePrix	
