= 2019–20 Jaguar I-Pace eTrophy =

Seasons
- ← 2018–19 none →

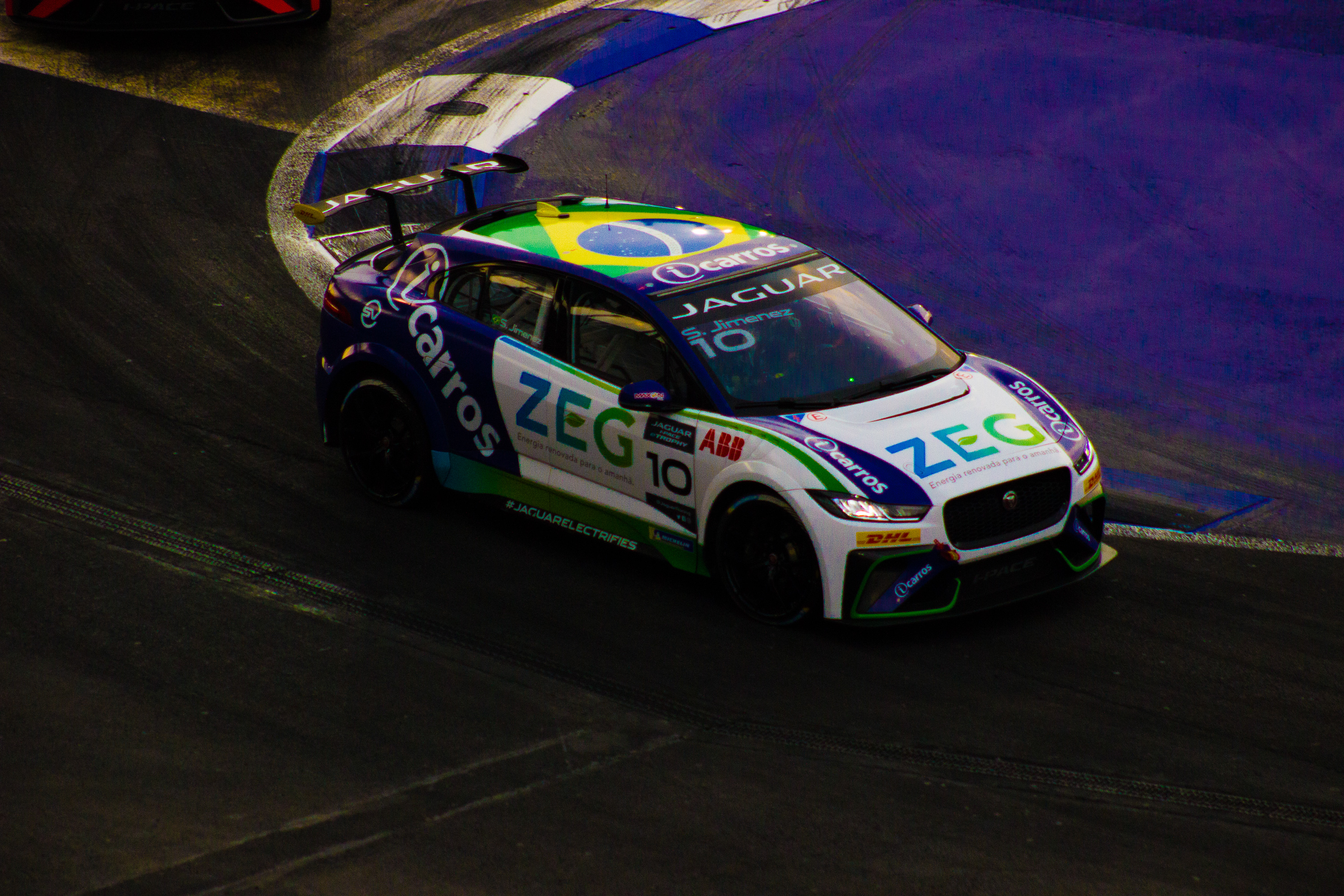
Sérgio Jimenez (pictured at the 2020 Mexico City ePrix) was the defending champion, this time losing to Simon Evans by just one point.

The 2019–20 Jaguar I-Pace eTrophy was the second and final season of the battery electric zero-emission international motor racing series supporting the FIA Formula E Championship, which started in November 2019 and ended in August 2020. The series saw entrants compete in a race-prepared Jaguar I-PACE, built by Jaguar's Special Vehicle Operations team with technical support from M-Sport, with the races taking place on selected Formula E weekends.

== Teams and drivers ==
Team	Class	No.	Drivers	Rounds
(United Kingdom) Jaguar VIP Car	G	1	(Saudi Arabia) Reema Juffali	1–2
(United Kingdom) Jaguar VIP Car	G	1	(Mexico) Mario Domínguez	3
(United Kingdom) Jaguar VIP Car	G	1	(United Kingdom) Oliver Webb	4–5
(United Kingdom) Jaguar VIP Car	G	1	(United Kingdom) Abbie Eaton	6–8
(United Kingdom) Jaguar VIP Car	G	1	(Austria) Sven Förster	9–10
(United Kingdom) Jaguar VIP Car	G	2	(United Kingdom) Abbie Eaton	1–2
(United Kingdom) Jaguar VIP Car	G	2	(United Kingdom) Jessica Hawkins	9–10
(United Kingdom) Jaguar Team Junior	G	71	(Belgium) Vincent Radermecker	3 (Note: Radermecker only took part in free practice session and his times were not officially recorded.)
Full-time entries
ZEG iCarros Jaguar Brazil	P	3	(Brazil) Mário Haberfeld	1–2
ZEG iCarros Jaguar Brazil	P	3	(Brazil) Cacá Bueno	3–10
ZEG iCarros Jaguar Brazil	P	10	(Brazil) Sérgio Jimenez	All
ZEG iCarros Jaguar Brazil	PA	18	(Brazil) Adalberto Baptista	3–10
Jaguar ran racing eTROPHY Team Germany	P	7	(United Kingdom) Alice Powell	All
Jaguar China Racing	PA	8	(China) Sun Chao	1–2
Jaguar China Racing	PA	8	(China) David Cheng	3
Jaguar China Racing	P	8	(France) Gregory Segers	4–10
Jaguar China Racing	PA	9	(China) Yaqi Zhang	1–2
Jaguar China Racing	P	9	(Mexico) Manuel Cabrera	3
Jaguar China Racing	P	9	(Australia) Nick Foster	4–10
(Saudi Arabia) Saudi Racing	PA	13	(Saudi Arabia) Fahad Algosaibi	All
(Saudi Arabia) Saudi Racing	PA	34	(Saudi Arabia) Mashhur Bal Hejaila	1–3
(Saudi Arabia) Saudi Racing	PA	34	(Saudi Arabia) Paul Spooner (Note: Ahmed Bin Khanen was originally supposed to replace Mashhur Bal Hejaila, but withdrew. Spooner, a Brit and the team's manager, stepped in and raced under a Saudi Arabian license.)	4–10
(Japan) Team Yokohama Challenge	P	24	(Japan) Takuma Aoki	3–10
(Sri Lanka) (Singapore) Team Asia New Zealand	P	99	(New Zealand) Simon Evans	All

Icon	Class
P	Pro
PA	Pro-Am
G	Guest

=== Driver changes ===
- Alice Powell joined the grid as a full-time driver, formerly competing in the inaugural race as a VIP driver.
- Fahad Algosaibi and Mashhur Bal Hejaila replaced the reigning Pro-Am Champion Bandar Alesayi and Ahmed Bin-Khanen at Saudi Racing.
- Sun Chao replaced Ziyi Zhang at Jaguar China Racing.

=== Team changes ===
- Rahal Letterman Lanigan Racing, who previously competed in the Pro class, will not return to the series.
- Team Germany has moved to the Pro class after replacing Célia Martin with Alice Powell.

=== Mid-season changes ===
- Mário Haberfeld replaced Cacá Bueno in the opening race weekend in Diriyah. Bueno returned in the following round.
- A new Japanese entry dubbed 'Team Yokohama Challenge' will field Takuma Aoki, the first disabled person to compete in an international electric race series, starting with round three at Autódromo Hermanos Rodríguez in Mexico City.
- ZEG iCarros Jaguar Brazil expanded their entry to three cars prior to the Mexico City ePrix and added Adalberto Baptista to their lineup.
- Jaguar China Racing couldn't fly its standard driver lineup to Mexico City due to the COVID-19 pandemic, which forced the team to replace them with David Cheng and a local driver Manuel Cabrera.
- The rescheduled Berlin ePrix saw Sun Chao, Yaqi Zhang (Jaguar China Racing) and Mashhur Bal Hejaila (Saudi Racing) missing the event, with the respective teams using replacement drivers.

== Calendar ==
Round	City	Country	Circuit	Date
1	Diriyah	Saudi Arabia	Riyadh Street Circuit	22 November 2019
2	Diriyah	Saudi Arabia	Riyadh Street Circuit	23 November 2019
3	Mexico City	Mexico	Autódromo Hermanos Rodríguez	15 February 2020
4	Berlin	Germany	Tempelhof Airport Street Circuit (Note: Each pair of dates will use a different track configuration.)	5 August 2020
5	Berlin	Germany	Tempelhof Airport Street Circuit	6 August 2020
6	Berlin	Germany	Tempelhof Airport Street Circuit	8 August 2020
7	Berlin	Germany	Tempelhof Airport Street Circuit	9 August 2020
8	Berlin	Germany	Tempelhof Airport Street Circuit	9 August 2020
9	Berlin	Germany	Tempelhof Airport Street Circuit	12 August 2020
10	Berlin	Germany	Tempelhof Airport Street Circuit	13 August 2020
CAN	Sanya	China	Sanya Street Circuit	~~21 March 2020~~
CAN	Rome	Italy	Circuito Cittadino dell'EUR	~~4 April 2020~~
CAN	Paris	France	Circuit des Invalides	~~18 April 2020~~
CAN	New York City	United States	Brooklyn Street Circuit	~~11 July 2020~~
CAN	London	United Kingdom	ExCeL London (Note: The circuit was designed as an indoor-outdoor venue, combining the ExCeL facilities and the surrounding public roads at Royal Docks.)	~~25 July 2020~~
CAN	London	United Kingdom	ExCeL London	~~26 July 2020~~

=== Calendar changes ===
- The Diriyah ePrix was expanded to two races.
- The Monaco ePrix did not return for this season as the event is run biennially.
- The Hong Kong ePrix, scheduled for 1 March, was scrapped due to political protests in the city. The event was supposed to be replaced by the returning Sanya ePrix.
- Any races scheduled after 1 March 2020 were initially postponed and then cancelled due to the COVID-19 pandemic until it was announced that the Berlin ePrix will host all of the remaining races in August.

== Regulation changes ==
=== Technical regulations ===
- The "attack mode" system would be adopted from the parent series after successful trials were completed in New York City in July 2019.

== Pre-season ==
On 3 October 2019, Mark Turner was announced as the series' championship manager. Turner was formerly involved in the Audi R8 LMS Cup, Formula BMW and the SEAT Cupra Championship. The new VIP car was unveiled on the same day, now sporting a black-dominated livery with cyan accents. Pre-season testing began on 28 October at the Bedford Autodrome.

== Results and standings ==
Round	Race	Qualifying · Pole position		Race		
Round	Race	Pro	Pro-Am	Fastest lap	Winning Pro	Winning Pro-Am
1	(Saudi Arabia) Diriyah	(New Zealand) Simon Evans	(China) Yaqi Zhang	(United Kingdom) Alice Powell	(New Zealand) Simon Evans	(China) Yaqi Zhang
2	(Saudi Arabia) Diriyah	(Brazil) Sérgio Jimenez	(China) Yaqi Zhang	(Brazil) Sérgio Jimenez	(Brazil) Sérgio Jimenez	(China) Yaqi Zhang
3	Mexico City	Session cancelled (Note: Session was cancelled due to ongoing track repairs caused by Daniel Abt's crash in Formula E's Free Practice 1. It was decided that the grid order would be based on Free Practice results, meaning that Sérgio Jimenez and Fahad Algosaibi would start from pole position in their respective classes.)		(Brazil) Cacá Bueno	(Brazil) Sérgio Jimenez	(Saudi Arabia) Fahad Algosaibi
4	(Germany) Berlin	(Brazil) Cacá Bueno	(Saudi Arabia) Fahad Algosaibi	(Brazil) Cacá Bueno	(Brazil) Cacá Bueno	(Saudi Arabia) Fahad Algosaibi
5	(Germany) Berlin	(Brazil) Cacá Bueno	(Saudi Arabia) Fahad Algosaibi	(United Kingdom) Oliver Webb	(Brazil) Sérgio Jimenez	(Saudi Arabia) Fahad Algosaibi
6	(Germany) Berlin	(Brazil) Sérgio Jimenez	(Saudi Arabia) Fahad Algosaibi	(Australia) Nick Foster	(Brazil) Sérgio Jimenez	(Saudi Arabia) Fahad Algosaibi
7	(Germany) Berlin	(Brazil) Sérgio Jimenez	(Saudi Arabia) Fahad Algosaibi	(France) Gregory Segers	(New Zealand) Simon Evans	(Saudi Arabia) Fahad Algosaibi
8	(Germany) Berlin	Reverse grid race		(New Zealand) Simon Evans	(New Zealand) Simon Evans	(Saudi Arabia) Fahad Algosaibi
9	(Germany) Berlin	(Brazil) Cacá Bueno	(Saudi Arabia) Fahad Algosaibi	(Brazil) Sérgio Jimenez	(New Zealand) Simon Evans	(Saudi Arabia) Paul Spooner
10	(Germany) Berlin	(Brazil) Cacá Bueno	(Saudi Arabia) Fahad Algosaibi	(New Zealand) Simon Evans	(Brazil) Cacá Bueno	(Brazil) Adalberto Baptista

=== Drivers' Championship ===
Points were awarded to the top ten classified finishers in every race, and the pole position starter in each class, using the following structure:

Position	**1st**	**2nd**	**3rd**	**4th**	**5th**	**6th**	**7th**	**8th**	**9th**	**10th**	**Pole**
Points	20	15	11	8	6	5	4	3	2	1	1

Pos.	Driver	DIR (Saudi Arabia)		MEX‡ (Mexico)	BER (Germany)		BER (Germany)			BER (Germany)		Pts
Pro class
1	(New Zealand) Simon Evans	**1**^{1}	2^{2}	2^{2}	3^{3}	2^{2}	3^{3}	1^{1}	1^{1}	1^{1}	2^{2}	163
2	(Brazil) Sérgio Jimenez	2^{2}	**1**^{1}	**1**^{1}	4^{4}	1^{1}	**1**^{1}	**2**^{2}	2^{2}	2^{2}	3^{3}	162
3	(Brazil) Cacá Bueno			7^{4}	**1**^{1}	**3**^{3}	2^{2}	3^{3}	3^{3}	**3**^{3}	**1**^{1}	111
4	(United Kingdom) Alice Powell	3^{3}	3^{3}	8^{5}	6^{5}	7^{6}	5^{5}	5^{5}	10^{6}	5^{5}	4^{4}	70
5	(Australia) Nick Foster				2^{2}	5^{4}	11^{7}†	4^{4}	Ret	4^{4}	5^{5}	49
6	(Japan) Takuma Aoki			5^{3}	9^{7}	9^{7}	7^{6}	8^{7}	7^{5}	9^{7}	7^{7}	42
7	(France) Gregory Segers				7^{6}	6^{5}	4^{4}	7^{6}	4^{4}	6^{6}	6^{6}	42
8	(Brazil) Mário Haberfeld	8^{4}	7^{4}									16
9	(Mexico) Manuel Cabrera			Ret								0
Pro-Am class
1	(Saudi Arabia) Fahad Algosaibi	6^{2}	Ret	**4**^{1}	**8**^{1}	**8**^{1}	**6**^{1}	**9**^{1}	5^{1}	**8**^{2}	**11**^{2}	171
2	(Brazil) Adalberto Baptista			6^{2}	10^{2}	11^{3}	10^{3}	10^{2}	9^{3}	10^{3}	8^{1}	109
3	(Saudi Arabia) Paul Spooner				11^{3}	10^{2}	9^{2}	11^{3}	8^{2}	7^{1}	Ret	87
4	(China) Yaqi Zhang	**4**^{1}	**5**^{1}									42
5	(China) Sun Chao	7^{3}	6^{2}									26
6	(Saudi Arabia) Mashhur Bal Hejaila	9^{4}	8^{3}	Ret								19
7	(China) David Cheng			Ret								0
8	(Saudi Arabia) Ahmed Bin Khanen				WD	WD						0
Guest drivers ineligible for points
	(Mexico) Mario Domínguez			3								
	(United Kingdom) Abbie Eaton	5^{1}	4^{1}				8	6	6			
	(United Kingdom) Oliver Webb				5	4						
	(Austria) Sven Förster									12^{2}	9^{1}	
	(Saudi Arabia) Reema Juffali	10^{2}	Ret									
	(United Kingdom) Jessica Hawkins									11^{1}	10^{2}	

Colour	Result
Gold	Winner
Silver	Second place
Bronze	Third place
Green	Points classification
Blue	Non-points classification
Blue	Non-classified finish (NC)
Purple	Retired, not classified (Ret)
Red	Did not qualify (DNQ)
Red	Did not pre-qualify (DNPQ)
Black	Disqualified (DSQ)
White	Did not start (DNS)
White	Withdrew (WD)
White	Race cancelled (C)
Blank	Did not practice (DNP)
Blank	Did not arrive (DNA)
Blank	Excluded (EX)

**Bold** – Pole
^{Superscript} – Position within class

† – Driver did not finish the race, but was classified as he completed over 90% of the race distance.
‡ – Qualification was not held, therefore, no extra point was given for pole position.

== See also ==
- Formula E
- Electric motorsport
