= 2016–17 NZ Touring Cars Championship =

The 2016–17 NZ Touring Cars Championship was the eighteenth season of the series, and the second under the NZ Touring Cars name. The field comprised three classes racing on the same grid. Class one featured both V8ST and NZV8 TLX cars. Class two and three consisted of older NZV8 TL cars.

Simon Evans successfully defended the title with another dominant display throughout the championship, whilst Liam MacDonald won the Class Two category.

== Race calendar ==
Rnd	Circuit	Date	Map
2016			2016–17 NZ Touring Cars Championship is located in New Zealand
1	Pukekohe Park Raceway (Pukekohe, Auckland Region)	4–6 November	2016–17 NZ Touring Cars Championship is located in New Zealand
2	Bruce McLaren Motorsport Park (Taupō, Waikato)	10–11 December	2016–17 NZ Touring Cars Championship is located in New Zealand
2017			2016–17 NZ Touring Cars Championship is located in New Zealand
3	Mike Pero Motorsport Park (Christchurch, Canterbury Region)	13–15 January	2016–17 NZ Touring Cars Championship is located in New Zealand
4	Teretonga Park (Invercargill, Southland Region)	20–22 January	2016–17 NZ Touring Cars Championship is located in New Zealand
5	Manfeild: Circuit Chris Amon (Feilding, Manawatū District)	10–12 February	2016–17 NZ Touring Cars Championship is located in New Zealand
6	Hampton Downs Motorsport Park (Hampton Downs, Waikato)	10–12 March	2016–17 NZ Touring Cars Championship is located in New Zealand

== Teams and drivers ==
Manufacturer	Vehicle	Team	No.	Driver	Rounds
Class One
Ford	Falcon (FG)	John Midgley Racing	19	(New Zealand) John Midgley	1, 6
Ford	Falcon (FG)	Richards Team Motorsport	97	(Australia) Jason Bargwanna	All
Ford	Falcon (FG)	Brock Cooley Motorsport	111	(New Zealand) Brock Cooley	All
Holden	Commodore (VE)	Team 4	1	(New Zealand) Simon Evans	All
Holden	Commodore (VE)	Hamilton Motorsports	11	(New Zealand) Tom Alexander	All
Holden	Commodore (VE)	Hamilton Motorsports	84	(New Zealand) Lance Hughes	All
Holden	Commodore (VE)	Quin Motorsport	91	(New Zealand) Callum Quin	2, 5
Nissan	Altima (L33)	Concept Motorsport	007	(New Zealand) Nick Ross	All
Toyota	Toyota Camry (XV50)	Richards Team Motorsport	71	(New Zealand) Sam Barry	All
Class Two
Ford	Falcon (BF)	Jamie Conroy Racing	16	(New Zealand) Jamie Conroy	All
Ford	Falcon (BF)	Steve Taylor Racing	33	(New Zealand) Steve Taylor	1–2
Ford	Falcon (BF)	Bronson Porter Racing	40	(New Zealand) Bronson Porter	1
Ford	Falcon (BF)	Average Joe Racing	46	(New Zealand) Simon Fleming	All
Ford	Falcon (BF)	Cheslea Herbert Racing	62	(New Zealand) Chelsea Herbert	All
Ford	Falcon (BF)	Nick Farrier Motorsport	63	(New Zealand) Nick Farrier	All
Ford	Falcon (BF)	Liam MacDonald Racing	69	(New Zealand) Liam MacDonald	All
Ford	Falcon (BF)	Brad Lathrope Racing	73	(New Zealand) Brad Lathrope	All
Ford	Falcon (BF)	Robert Wallace Racing	77	(New Zealand) Robert Wallace	1–2, 5–6
Holden	Commodore (VY)	Brendon Murphy Motorsport	23	(New Zealand) Brendon Murphy	1

== Calendar ==
Round 1 will be held in support of the 2016 ITM Auckland SuperSprint while Round 5 will be in support of the 2017 New Zealand Grand Prix.

Rnd		Circuit	Pole position	Fastest lap	Class 1 Winner	Class 2 Winner
2016
1	R1	Pukekohe Park Raceway (Pukekohe, Auckland Region)	(New Zealand) Simon Evans	(New Zealand) Simon Evans	(New Zealand) Simon Evans	(New Zealand) Brad Lathrope
1	R2	Pukekohe Park Raceway (Pukekohe, Auckland Region)		(New Zealand) Simon Evans	(New Zealand) Simon Evans	(New Zealand) Liam MacDonald
1	R3	Pukekohe Park Raceway (Pukekohe, Auckland Region)		(New Zealand) Simon Evans	(New Zealand) Simon Evans	(New Zealand) Liam MacDonald
2	R1	Bruce McLaren Motorsport Park (Taupō, Taupō District)	(New Zealand) Simon Evans	(New Zealand) Simon Evans	(New Zealand) Simon Evans	(New Zealand) Liam MacDonald
2	R2	Bruce McLaren Motorsport Park (Taupō, Taupō District)		(New Zealand) Simon Evans	(New Zealand) Simon Evans	(New Zealand) Jamie Conroy
2	R3	Bruce McLaren Motorsport Park (Taupō, Taupō District)		(Australia) Jason Bargwanna	(New Zealand) Simon Evans	(New Zealand) Liam MacDonald
2017
3	R1	Mike Pero Motorsport Park (Christchurch, Canterbury)	(New Zealand) Simon Evans	(New Zealand) Simon Evans	(New Zealand) Simon Evans	(New Zealand) Liam MacDonald
3	R2	Mike Pero Motorsport Park (Christchurch, Canterbury)		(Australia) Jason Bargwanna	(Australia) Jason Bargwanna	(New Zealand) Liam MacDonald
3	R3	Mike Pero Motorsport Park (Christchurch, Canterbury)		(Australia) Jason Bargwanna	(New Zealand) Simon Evans	(New Zealand) Liam MacDonald
4	R1	Teretonga Park (Invercargill, Southland)	(New Zealand) Simon Evans	(New Zealand) Simon Evans	(New Zealand) Nick Ross	(New Zealand) Liam MacDonald
4	R2	Teretonga Park (Invercargill, Southland)		(New Zealand) Simon Evans	(Australia) Jason Bargwanna	(New Zealand) Liam MacDonald
4	R3	Teretonga Park (Invercargill, Southland)		(New Zealand) Simon Evans	(New Zealand) Simon Evans	(New Zealand) Liam MacDonald
5	R1	Manfeild: Circuit Chris Amon (Feilding, Manawatū District)	(New Zealand) Simon Evans	(New Zealand) Simon Evans	(New Zealand) Simon Evans	(New Zealand) Brad Lathrope
5	R2	Manfeild: Circuit Chris Amon (Feilding, Manawatū District)		(New Zealand) Simon Evans	(New Zealand) Simon Evans	(New Zealand) Jamie Conroy
5	R3	Manfeild: Circuit Chris Amon (Feilding, Manawatū District)		(New Zealand) Simon Evans	(New Zealand) Sam Barry	(New Zealand) Liam MacDonald
6	R1	Hampton Downs Motorsport Park (Hampton Downs, North Waikato)	(New Zealand) Simon Evans	(New Zealand) Simon Evans	(New Zealand) Simon Evans	(New Zealand) Liam MacDonald
6	R2	Hampton Downs Motorsport Park (Hampton Downs, North Waikato)		(New Zealand) Simon Evans	(Australia) Jason Bargwanna	(New Zealand) Nick Farrier
6	R3	Hampton Downs Motorsport Park (Hampton Downs, North Waikato)		(Australia) Jason Bargwanna	(New Zealand) Simon Evans	(New Zealand) Jamie Conroy

== Championship standings ==
Pos	Driver	PUK			TAU			RUA			TER			MAN			HAM			Pen.	Pts
Pos	Driver	R1	R2	R3	R1	R2	R3	R1	R2	R3	R1	R2	R3	R1	R2	R3	R1	R2	R3	Pen.	Pts
Class One
1	(New Zealand) Simon Evans	**1**	1	1	**1**	1	1	**1**	3	1	**5**	4	1	**1**	1	1	**1**	2	1		1272
2	(New Zealand) Tom Alexander	4	2	4	3	4	6	4	2	4	3	3	3	4	4	3	Ret	4	7		965
3	(Australia) Jason Bargwanna	5	Ret	DNS	DNS	6	2	2	1	2	2	1	2	3	Ret	DNS	2	1	2		848
4	(New Zealand) Sam Barry	3	Ret	2	4	3	4	5	4	3	4	Ret	10	Ret	2	1	5	5	9		846
5	(New Zealand) Lance Hughes	6	5	3	5	5	7	7	Ret	7	Ret	5	15	5	5	5	4	3	4		802
6	(New Zealand) Nick Ross	2	Ret	Ret	2	2	5	3	Ret	DNS	1	2	9	2	Ret	7	3	Ret	Ret		670
7	(New Zealand) Brock Cooley	Ret	4	6	6	7	13	6	DNS	DNS	6	6	6	7	6	6	6	8	Ret		646
8	(New Zealand) Callum Quin				7	11	3							6	3	4					300
9	(New Zealand) John Midgley	8	DNS	DNS													Ret	Ret	3		42
Class Two
1	(New Zealand) Liam MacDonald	13	6	7	9	13	8	8	5	5	7	7	4	15	10	8	9	12	8		1234
2	(New Zealand) Brad Lathrope	9	16	8	12	10	12	11	6	8	8	11	8	8	8	9	Ret	DNS	DNS		911
3	(New Zealand) Jamie Conroy	19	11	11	10	9	9	Ret	Ret	6	Ret	8	5	DNS	7	11	14	10	6		858
4	(New Zealand) Chelsea Herbert	14	8	13	14	18	Ret	12	9	10	10	12	13	9	11	Ret	13	11	10		814
5	(New Zealand) Nick Farrier	10	10	18	Ret	14	10	10	Ret	Ret	12	10	11	10	13	10	10	9	Ret		778
6	(New Zealand) Simon Fleming	18	13	12	17	Ret	DNS	13	7	11	9	13	14	11	Ret	13	12	13	11		721
7	(New Zealand) Robert Wallace	15	15	15	13	15	11							12	9	Ret	11	Ret	DNS		446
8	(New Zealand) Justin Ashwell							9	8	9	11	9	7								344
9	(New Zealand) Steve Taylor	12	7	10	16	16	DNS														322
10	(New Zealand) Bronson Porter	16	9	14																	138
11	(New Zealand) Ian Clapperton							Ret	10	Ret	Ret	14	12								129
12	(New Zealand) Brendan Murphy	17	12	16																	117
Pos	Driver	R1	R2	R3	R1	R2	R3	R1	R2	R3	R1	R2	R3	R1	R2	R3	R1	R2	R3	Pen.	Pts
Pos	Driver	PUK			TAU			RUA			TER			MAN			HAM			Pen.	Pts

Colour	Result
Gold	Winner
Silver	Second place
Bronze	Third place
Green	Points classification
Blue	Non-points classification
Blue	Non-classified finish (NC)
Purple	Retired, not classified (Ret)
Red	Did not qualify (DNQ)
Red	Did not pre-qualify (DNPQ)
Black	Disqualified (DSQ)
White	Did not start (DNS)
White	Withdrew (WD)
White	Race cancelled (C)
Blank	Did not practice (DNP)
Blank	Did not arrive (DNA)
Blank	Excluded (EX)

**Bold** - Pole position
Italics - Fastest lap
