= 2018–19 Jaguar I-Pace eTrophy =

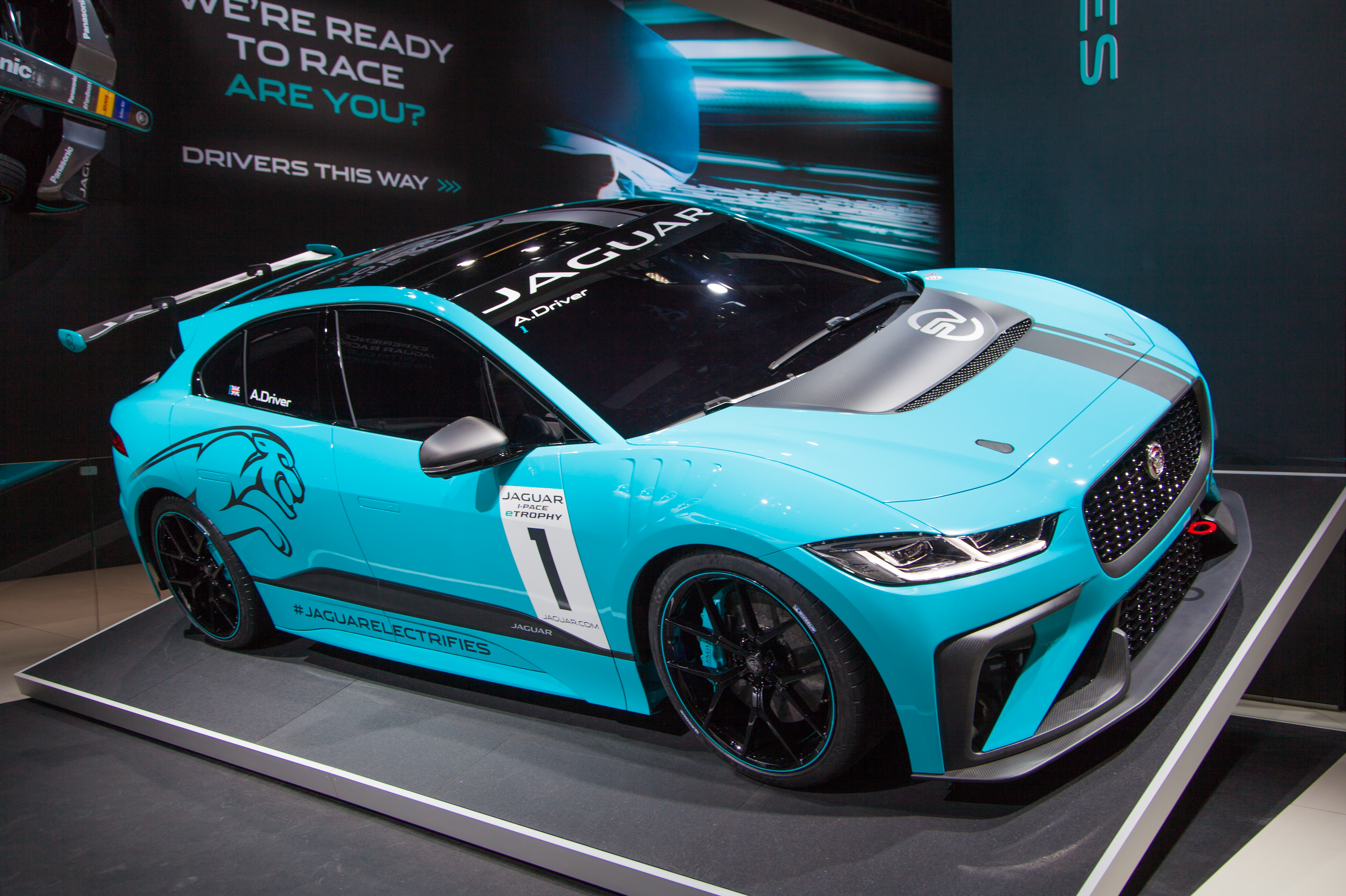
Jaguar I-Pace car concept at the Frankfurt Autoshow 2017

The 2018–19 Jaguar I-Pace eTrophy was the inaugural season of the battery electric zero-emission international motor racing series supporting the FIA Formula E Championship. It started in December 2018 and ended in July 2019. The series saw entrants compete in a race-prepared Jaguar I-PACE, built by Jaguar's Special Vehicle Operations team with technical support from M-Sport, who maintain the cars. The races took place on selected Formula E weekends.

== Teams and drivers ==
Team	Class	No.	Drivers	Rounds
(United Kingdom) Jaguar VIP Car	G	1	(United Kingdom) Alice Powell	1
(United Kingdom) Jaguar VIP Car	G	1	(Mexico) Salvador Durán	2
(United Kingdom) Jaguar VIP Car	G	1	(Hong Kong) Darryl O'Young	3
(United Kingdom) Jaguar VIP Car	G	1	(China) David Cheng	4
(United Kingdom) Jaguar VIP Car	G	1	(Italy) Luca Salvadori	5
(United Kingdom) Jaguar VIP Car	G	1	(United Kingdom) Archie Hamilton	6
(United Kingdom) Jaguar VIP Car	G	1	(France) Anthony Beltoise	7
(United Kingdom) Jaguar VIP Car	G	1	(Germany) Jens Dralle	8
(United Kingdom) Jaguar VIP Car	G	1	(Canada) Mark Hacking	9–10
Full-time entries
Jaguar Brazil Racing	P	0	(Brazil) Cacá Bueno	All
Jaguar Brazil Racing	P	10	(Brazil) Sérgio Jimenez	All
(United States) Rahal Letterman Lanigan Racing	P	3	(United Kingdom) Katherine Legge	All
(United States) Rahal Letterman Lanigan Racing	P	6	(United States) Bryan Sellers	All
Viessmann Jaguar I-PACE eTROPHY Team Germany	PA	7	(France) Célia Martin	All
Jaguar China Racing	PA	8	(China) Tao Wang	1, 4
Jaguar China Racing	PA	9	(China) Yaqi Zhang	All
Jaguar China Racing	PA	11	(China) Qi Lin	2–3, 5
Jaguar China Racing	PA	15	(China) Ziyi Zhang	6–10
(Saudi Arabia) Saudi Racing	PA	12	(Saudi Arabia) Bandar Alesayi	All
(Saudi Arabia) Saudi Racing	PA	24	(Saudi Arabia) Ahmed Bin Khanen	All
(China) TWR Techeetah	P	18	(Canada) Stefan Rzadzinski	1–7
(China) TWR Techeetah	P	77	(United Kingdom) Adam Carroll	8
(Sri Lanka) (Singapore) Team Asia New Zealand	P	99	(New Zealand) Simon Evans	All

Icon	Class
P	Pro
PA	Pro-Am
G	Guest

=== Mid-season changes ===
- A new Austrian entry, led by Thomas Bleiner, was attempting to enter championship mid-season. An entry dubbed 'Team Bleiner' was featured on a provisional entry list for the second round in Mexico City, but never actually entered the championship.
- Jaguar China Racing have been rotating multiple drivers throughout the season before ultimately sticking with the line-up of Yaqi Zhang (who competed in every race) and Ziyi Zhang.
- Stefan Rzadzinski's deal with TWR Techeetah came to end before the Berlin ePrix. A former Panasonic Jaguar Racing driver and the 2008–09 A1GP champion Adam Carroll was announced as his replacement. The team, however, completely withdrew from the following round held in New York City.

== Calendar ==
Round	City	Country	Circuit	Date
1	Diriyah	Saudi Arabia	Riyadh Street Circuit	15 December 2018
2	Mexico City	Mexico	Autódromo Hermanos Rodríguez	16 February 2019
3	Hong Kong	Hong Kong	Hong Kong Central Harbourfront Circuit	10 March 2019
4	Sanya	China	Sanya Street Circuit	23 March 2019
5	Rome	Italy	Circuito Cittadino dell'EUR	13 April 2019
6	Paris	France	Circuit des Invalides	27 April 2019
7	Monaco	Monaco	Circuit de Monaco	11 May 2019
8	Berlin	Germany	Tempelhof Airport Street Circuit	25 May 2019
9	New York City	United States	Brooklyn Street Circuit	13 July 2019
10	New York City	United States	Brooklyn Street Circuit	14 July 2019

== Results and standings ==
Round	Race	Pole position	Fastest lap	Winning Pro	Winning Team	Winning Pro-Am
1	(Saudi Arabia) Ad Diriyah	(New Zealand) Simon Evans	(United Kingdom) Katherine Legge	(New Zealand) Simon Evans	Team Asia New Zealand	(Saudi Arabia) Bandar Alesayi
2	Mexico City	(United Kingdom) Katherine Legge	(United States) Bryan Sellers	(United Kingdom) Katherine Legge	Rahal Letterman Lanigan Racing	(Saudi Arabia) Bandar Alesayi
3	Hong Kong	(Brazil) Cacá Bueno	(New Zealand) Simon Evans	(United States) Bryan Sellers	Rahal Letterman Lanigan Racing	(China) Yaqi Zhang
4	(China) Sanya	(Brazil) Cacá Bueno	(United States) Bryan Sellers	(Brazil) Cacá Bueno	Jaguar Brazil Racing	(Saudi Arabia) Bandar Alesayi
5	(Italy) Rome	(Brazil) Sérgio Jimenez	(Brazil) Cacá Bueno	(Brazil) Sérgio Jimenez	Jaguar Brazil Racing	(Saudi Arabia) Bandar Alesayi
6	(France) Paris	(United States) Bryan Sellers	(New Zealand) Simon Evans	(United States) Bryan Sellers	Rahal Letterman Lanigan Racing	(Saudi Arabia) Ahmed Bin-Khanen
7	Monaco	(Brazil) Cacá Bueno	(Brazil) Cacá Bueno	(Brazil) Cacá Bueno	Jaguar Brazil Racing	(China) Yaqi Zhang
8	(Germany) Berlin	(Brazil) Cacá Bueno	(Brazil) Sérgio Jimenez	(Brazil) Cacá Bueno	Jaguar Brazil Racing	(China) Yaqi Zhang
9	(United States) New York City	(Brazil) Sérgio Jimenez	(Brazil) Cacá Bueno	(Brazil) Sérgio Jimenez	Jaguar Brazil Racing	(Saudi Arabia) Bandar Alesayi
10	(United States) New York City	(Brazil) Sérgio Jimenez	(Brazil) Sérgio Jimenez	(Brazil) Sérgio Jimenez	Jaguar Brazil Racing	(Saudi Arabia) Ahmed Bin-Khanen

=== Drivers' championship ===
Points were awarded to the top ten classified finishers in every race, and the pole position starter in each class, using the following structure:

Position	**1st**	**2nd**	**3rd**	**4th**	**5th**	**6th**	**7th**	**8th**	**9th**	**10th**	**Pole**
Points	20	15	11	8	6	5	4	3	2	1	1

Pos.	Driver	ADR‡ (Saudi Arabia)	MEX (Mexico)	HKG (Hong Kong)	SYX (China)	RME (Italy)	PAR (France)	MCO (Monaco)	BER (Germany)	NYC (United States)		Pts
Pro class
1	(Brazil) Sérgio Jimenez	2^{2}	3^{3}	3^{3}	4^{4}	**1**^{1}	3^{3}	2^{2}	2^{2}	**1**^{1}	**1**^{1}	149
2	(Brazil) Cacá Bueno	4^{4}	4^{4}	**5**^{5}	**1**^{1}	6^{6}	Ret	**1**^{1}	**1**^{1}	2^{2}	2^{2}	121
3	(United States) Bryan Sellers	3^{3}	2^{2}	1^{1}	DSQ	2^{2}	**1**^{1}	3^{3}	4^{4}	DNS	5^{5}	107
4	(New Zealand) Simon Evans	**1**^{1}	6^{5}	4^{4}	2^{2}	3^{3}	4^{4}	4^{4}	3^{3}	3^{3}	4^{4}	106
5	(United Kingdom) Katherine Legge	6^{5}	**1**^{1}	2^{2}	5^{5}	4^{4}	10^{5}	Ret	6^{6}	4^{4}	3^{3}	86
6	(Canada) Stefan Rzadzinski	12^{6}	Ret	Ret	3^{3}	5^{5}	2^{2}	10^{5}				43
7	(United Kingdom) Adam Carroll								5^{5}			6
Pro-Am class
1	(Saudi Arabia) Bandar Alesayi	**7**^{1}	**5**^{1}	8^{2}	**6**^{1}	7^{1}	**8**^{4}	**6**^{2}	**Ret**	**5**^{1}	8^{3}	155
2	(China) Yaqi Zhang	10^{4}	Ret	**7**^{1}	9^{3}	9^{2}	7^{3}	5^{1}	7^{1}	6^{2}	7^{2}	136
3	(Saudi Arabia) Ahmed Bin-Khanen	8^{2}	7^{2}	Ret	8^{2}	**11**^{4}	5^{1}	Ret	9^{3}	7^{3}	**6**^{1}	117
4	(France) Célia Martin	11^{5}	Ret	9^{3}	DNS	10^{3}	6^{2}	8^{3}	8^{2}	8^{4}	Ret	77
5	(China) Ziyi Zhang						9^{5}	9^{4}	11^{4}	9^{5}	9^{4}	36
6	(China) Tao Wang	9^{3}			Ret							11
7	(China) Qi Lin		8^{3}	Ret		Ret						11
Guest drivers ineligible for points
	(United Kingdom) Alice Powell	5										
	(Hong Kong) Darryl O'Young			6								
	(China) David Cheng				7							
	(France) Anthony Beltoise							7				
	(Italy) Luca Salvadori					8						
	(Germany) Jens Dralle								10			
	(Mexico) Salvador Durán		Ret									
	(United Kingdom) Archie Hamilton						Ret					
	(Canada) Mark Hacking									Ret	DNS	

Colour	Result
Gold	Winner
Silver	Second place
Bronze	Third place
Green	Points classification
Blue	Non-points classification
Blue	Non-classified finish (NC)
Purple	Retired, not classified (Ret)
Red	Did not qualify (DNQ)
Red	Did not pre-qualify (DNPQ)
Black	Disqualified (DSQ)
White	Did not start (DNS)
White	Withdrew (WD)
White	Race cancelled (C)
Blank	Did not practice (DNP)
Blank	Did not arrive (DNA)
Blank	Excluded (EX)

**Bold** – Pole
^{Superscript} – Position within class

‡ – Qualification was not held due to poor weather conditions and safety concerns. Therefore, no extra point was given for pole position.

== See also ==
- Formula E
- Electric motorsport
