= Simon Evans (racing driver) =

New Zealand racing driver

- Nationality: (New Zealand) New Zealander
- Born: 12 November 1990 (age 36) Auckland, New Zealand
- Relatives: Mitch Evans (brother)

V8SuperTourer career
- Debut season: 2012
- Current team: Team 4
- Categorisation: FIA Gold
- Car number: 4
- Starts: 14
- Wins: 9
- Poles: 0
- Fastest laps: 3
- Best finish: 1st in 2014-15

Championship titles
- 2019-20: Jaguar I-Pace eTrophy - Pro

Simon Evans (born 12 November 1990) is a racing driver from New Zealand and is the Champion of the 2019-2020 Jaguar I-Pace eTrophy season having driven for Team Asia New Zealand. He is the brother of Formula E racer Mitch Evans.

== Career ==
In 2012, the all-new V8SuperTourer category was launched and Evans secured an endurance drive with Kayne Scott for Farmer Racing Services. The pair achieved a podium at the Pukekohe 500. In 2013, Evans took over Scott's entry and raced the full season. Evans would finish 16th overall, with only a single podium over the season. In 2014, Evans claimed seven podium finishes and finished runner up behind four-time Bathurst 1000 winner, Greg Murphy. Evans would then win what would prove to be the final season for the V8SuperTourer category. Achieving nine wins from twelve races, it was a dominant display, and an eventual precursor for the NZ Touring Car Championship.

Following this season, Evans signed with Super Black Racing to contend the V8 Supercar Dunlop Series for 2015. Whilst Evans achieved modest results in his first full-time season overseas, it wasn't enough to secure him a drive for the following season. Other international campaigns included a guest drive in the Audi Sport TT Cup event at the Nürburgring in 2016, as well as a full-season stint in the Chinese-based FRD LMP3 Series.

After the V8SuperTourer category merged with the New Zealand V8s, the NZ Touring Car Championship was born. Evans would contend the next two championships, with performances equally as dominant as what was demonstrated in the final V8SuperTourers season. He would win 23 out of the 38 races he contended, and claim both championships before leaving the category in 2017.

In 2018, Evans joined Jaguar I-Pace eTrophy, a closed-wheel feeder series to Formula E, where his brother Mitch also races for the Jaguar team. He won his first race in Saudi Arabia, racing at the same weekend as Formula E series.

== Racing record ==
=== Career summary ===
Season	Series	Team	Races	Wins	Poles	F/Laps	Podiums	Points	Position
2007-08	New Zealand Formula Ford Championship		19	1	0	0	2	765	7th
2008-09	New Zealand Formula Ford Championship		21	0	0	2	3	956	6th
2009-10	Porsche GT3 Cup Challenge New Zealand	Evans Motorsport	18	0	0	0	0	527	13th
2010-11	Suzuki Swift Sport Cup		6	1	0	0	1	272	18th
2010-11	Porsche GT3 Cup Challenge New Zealand	Evans Motorsport	18	0	0	0	0	567	7th
2011-12	New Zealand V8	Tulloch Motorsport	12	0	0	0	0	485	7th
2012	V8SuperTourer	Farmer Racing Services	5	0	0	0	1	801	27th
2013	V8SuperTourer	Farmer Racing Services	21	0	0	0	1	1548	16th
2014	V8SuperTourer	Team 4	13	0	0	3	7	836	**2nd**
2014-15	V8 SuperTourer	Team 4	12	9	5	0	11	1357	**1st**
2015	V8 Supercars Dunlop Series	Super Black Racing	16	0	0	0	0	961	9th
2015-16	NZ Touring Cars Championship	Team 4	20	10	7	11	16	1372	**1st**
2016	Audi Sport TT Cup		2	0	0	0	0	0	NC†
2016-17	NZ Touring Cars Championship	Team 4	18	13	6	13	16	1272	**1st**
2017	FRD LMP3 Series	PTRS	8	0	0	0	1	45	7th
2017	Intercontinental GT Challenge	Supabarn	1	0	0	0	0	0	NC†
2018-19	Jaguar I-Pace eTrophy	Team Asia New Zealand	10	1	1	0	5	106	4th
2019-20	Jaguar I-Pace eTrophy	Team Asia New Zealand	10	4	1	2	10	163	**1st**
2021	Toyota Finance 86 Championship	Giltrap Racing	15	5	0	2	12	968	**2nd**
2022	Toyota Finance 86 Championship	Giltrap Group Motorsport	19	6	3	3	11	1074	**2nd**
2022	SRO GT Anniversary	Kelly-Moss Road and Race							

† As he was a guest driver, Evans was ineligible to score points.

=== Complete Jaguar I-Pace eTrophy results ===
(key) (Races in bold indicate pole position)

Year	Team	Car	Class	1	2	3	4	5	6	7	8	9	10	D.C.	Points
2018–19	Team Asia New Zealand	Jaguar I-PACE eTROPHY	P	ADR; **1**^{1}	MEX; 6^{5}	HKG; 4^{4}	SYX; 2^{2}	RME; 3^{3}	PAR; 4^{4}	MCO; 4^{4}	BER; 3^{3}	NYC; 3^{3}	NYC; 4^{4}	4th	106
2019–20	Team Asia New Zealand	Jaguar I-PACE eTROPHY	P	ADR; **1**^{1}	ADR; 2^{2}	MEX; 2^{2}	BER; 3^{3}	BER; 2^{2}	BER; 3^{3}	BER; 1^{1}	BER; 1^{1}	BER; 1^{1}	BER; 2^{2}	1st	163
