= Jaguar I-Pace eTrophy =

Former racing series

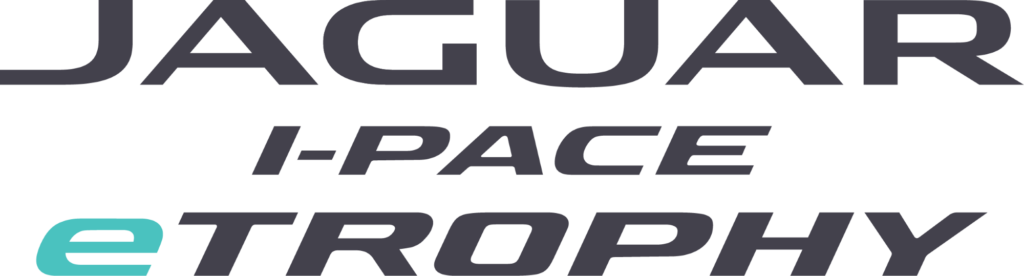
- Category: One-make racing stock production car by Jaguar
- Country: International
- Inaugural season: 2018–19
- Folded: 2020
- Classes: Pro, Pro-Am, Guest
- Tyre suppliers: Michelin
- Last Drivers' champion: (New Zealand) Simon Evans (Pro) (Saudi Arabia) Fahad Algosaibi (Pro-Am)

The Jaguar I-Pace eTrophy was a battery electric zero-emission international motor racing series supporting the FIA Formula E Championship which ran two seasons from late 2018 to mid 2020. The series was cancelled after the 2019–20 season, due to the COVID-19 pandemic. The eTrophy saw entrants compete in a race-prepared Jaguar I-Pace, also bearing the same name as the series, with the races taking place on selected Formula E weekends.

== Overview ==
The series was announced on 12 September 2017 at the Frankfurt Autoshow by chairman of Jaguar Racing Gerd Mäuser and Formula E CEO Alejandro Agag.

=== Car ===
The I-Pace racecar (carrying the same name as the series itself) was built by Jaguar Land Rover Special Vehicle Operations, and developed from the road going Jaguar I-Pace. Both the road going and racing versions of the I-Pace benefit from electric drive technology developed as part of Jaguar Racing's I-TYPE Formula E program.

On 11 January 2018, it was announced that Michelin would be the official tire supplier for the series.

=== Format ===
The series operated an 'Arrive and Drive' package for up to 20 drivers at each race, including a different VIP driver at every venue.

Much like its parent series, the race weekend began on the day before an ePrix with a shakedown session. It was usually the first on-track activity of the whole weekend. Unlike Formula E, the free practice session was also held on this day. A 30-minute qualifying session along with the race was then held the next day. Races were scheduled for 25 minutes + one lap.

For the 2019–20 season, Jaguar adopted the "attack mode" system from its parent series.

=== Teams and drivers ===
Drivers competed in three classes – Pro, Pro-Am and Guest. Only the Pro and Pro-Am drivers were eligible to score points in Drivers' Championship. Championship points were given separately for the Pro and Pro-Am class. The Guest class was reserved for a VIP driver who was ineligible to score points. There was no separate Teams' Championship to compete for.

The inaugural season saw eleven full-time entries with four teams entered in the Pro class and three teams entered in the Pro-Am class. Sérgio Jimenez from Jaguar Brazil Racing became the Pro Champion, while Bandar Alesayi from Saudi Racing won in the Pro-Am competition. There were nine different VIP drivers, with Alice Powell being the most successful, finishing fifth at the 2018 Ad Diriyah ePrix. The second season started with eight and finished with ten full-time entries. Simon Evans from Team Asia New Zealand won the Pro class by just one point, while Fahad Algosaibi from Saudi Racing dominated the Pro-Am class. There were six different VIP drivers, with Mario Domínguez finishing third at the 2020 Mexico City ePrix, the all-time best result for a VIP driver.

==== Complete list of VIP drivers ====
Complete list of VIP drivers
Season	Date	Event	Driver	Pos.
2018–19	15 December 2018	Ad Diriyah ePrix	(United Kingdom) Alice Powell	5
2018–19	16 February 2019	Mexico City ePrix	(Mexico) Salvador Durán	Ret
2018–19	10 March 2019	Hong Kong ePrix	(Hong Kong) Darryl O'Young	6
2018–19	23 March 2019	Sanya ePrix	(China) David Cheng	7
2018–19	13 April 2019	Rome ePrix	(Italy) Luca Salvadori	8
2018–19	27 April 2019	Paris ePrix	(United Kingdom) Archie Hamilton	Ret
2018–19	11 May 2019	Monaco ePrix	(France) Anthony Beltoise	7
2018–19	25 May 2019	Berlin ePrix	(Germany) Jens Dralle	10
2018–19	13 July 2019	New York City ePrix Race 1	(Canada) Mark Hacking	Ret
2018–19	14 July 2019	New York City ePrix Race 2	(Canada) Mark Hacking	DNS
2019–20	22 November 2019	Diriyah ePrix Race 1	(Saudi Arabia) Reema Juffali	10
2019–20	22 November 2019	Diriyah ePrix Race 1	(United Kingdom) Abbie Eaton	5
2019–20	23 November 2019	Diriyah ePrix Race 2	(Saudi Arabia) Reema Juffali	Ret
2019–20	23 November 2019	Diriyah ePrix Race 2	(United Kingdom) Abbie Eaton	4
2019–20	15 February 2020	Mexico City ePrix	(Mexico) Mario Domínguez	3
2019–20	5 August 2020	Berlin ePrix	(United Kingdom) Oliver Webb	5
2019–20	6 August 2020	Berlin ePrix	(United Kingdom) Oliver Webb	4
2019–20	8 August 2020	Berlin ePrix	(United Kingdom) Abbie Eaton	8
2019–20	9 August 2020 (Race 1)	Berlin ePrix	(United Kingdom) Abbie Eaton	6
2019–20	9 August 2020 (Race 2)	Berlin ePrix	(United Kingdom) Abbie Eaton	6
2019–20	12 August 2020	Berlin ePrix	(United Kingdom) Jessica Hawkins	11
2019–20	12 August 2020	Berlin ePrix	(Austria) Sven Förster	12
2019–20	13 August 2020	Berlin ePrix	(United Kingdom) Jessica Hawkins	10
2019–20	13 August 2020	Berlin ePrix	(Austria) Sven Förster	9
