= 2018 Ad Diriyah ePrix =

Formula E motor race in Saudi Arabia

Race 1 of 13 of the 2018–19 Formula E Championship
Next race →
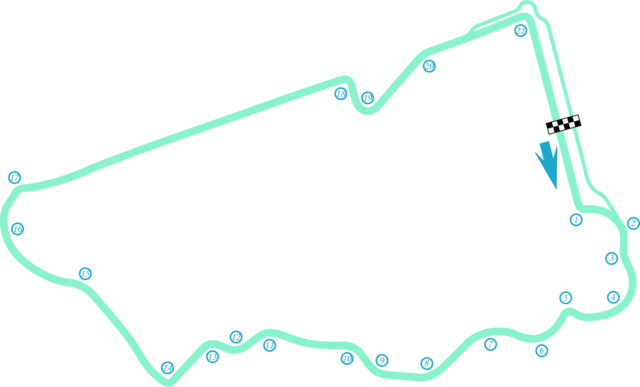

Race details
- Date: 15 December 2018
- Official name: 2018 SAUDIA Ad Diriyah E-Prix
- Location: Riyadh Street Circuit, Ad Diriyah, Riyadh, Saudi Arabia
- Course: Street circuit
- Course length: 2.495 km (1.550 mi)
- Distance: 33 laps, 82.335 km (51.161 mi)
- Weather: Cloudy

Pole position
Driver	(Portugal) António Félix da Costa	Andretti-BMW
- Time: 1:17.728

Fastest lap
Driver	(Germany) André Lotterer	Techeetah-DS
- Time: 1:12.591 on lap 32

Podium
First	(Portugal) António Félix da Costa	Andretti-BMW
Second	(France) Jean-Éric Vergne	Techeetah-DS
Third	(Belgium) Jérôme d'Ambrosio	Mahindra

The 2018 Ad Diriyah ePrix (formally the 2018 SAUDIA Ad Diriyah E-Prix) was a Formula E electric car race held at the Riyadh Street Circuit in the town of Diriyah, which is located north-west of the Saudi Arabian capital of Riyadh, on 15 December 2018 before a crowd of about 23,000 spectators. It was the first round of the 2018–19 Formula E Championship, the inaugural Ad Diriyah ePrix and the first Middle Eastern Formula E race.António Félix da Costa of the Andretti team won the 33-lap race from pole position. Techeetah driver Jean-Éric Vergne finished second and Jérôme d'Ambrosio took third for Mahindra.

The one day event was affected by heavy rain which flooded the track; as a result, the two scheduled practice sessions were cancelled and combined into a single 35 minute session. Qualifying was restructured into a half an hour two-group session that saw Félix da Costa claim the first pole position of his career. He held the lead for the opening 13 laps until Vergne passed him on the 14th lap. As Vergne appeared set to take his first victory of the season, he incurred a drive-through penalty for exceeding the maximum amount of power permitted under electrical energy harvesting. He took the penalty in the pit lane and fell to fifth. Vergne recovered through the field but he could not make a successful pass on the final lap on Félix da Costa who took the second win of his career and BMW's first as a Formula E manufacturer.

Because this was the first race of the season, Félix da Costa left Ad Diriyah as the Drivers' Championship leader with 28 points (25 for the win and three for the pole position). Vergne was ten points behind in second and d'Ambrosio was a further three points adrift in third. Mitch Evans was fourth with 12 points and André Lotterer rounded out the top five with 11 points after earning an extra point for setting the fastest lap. In the Teams' Championship, Techeetah led with 29 points, ahead of Andretti with one point less. Mahindra, e.Dams-Nissan and Jaguar were all one point behind each other in positions three to five with twelve races left in the season.

== Background ==
=== Regulation changes ===
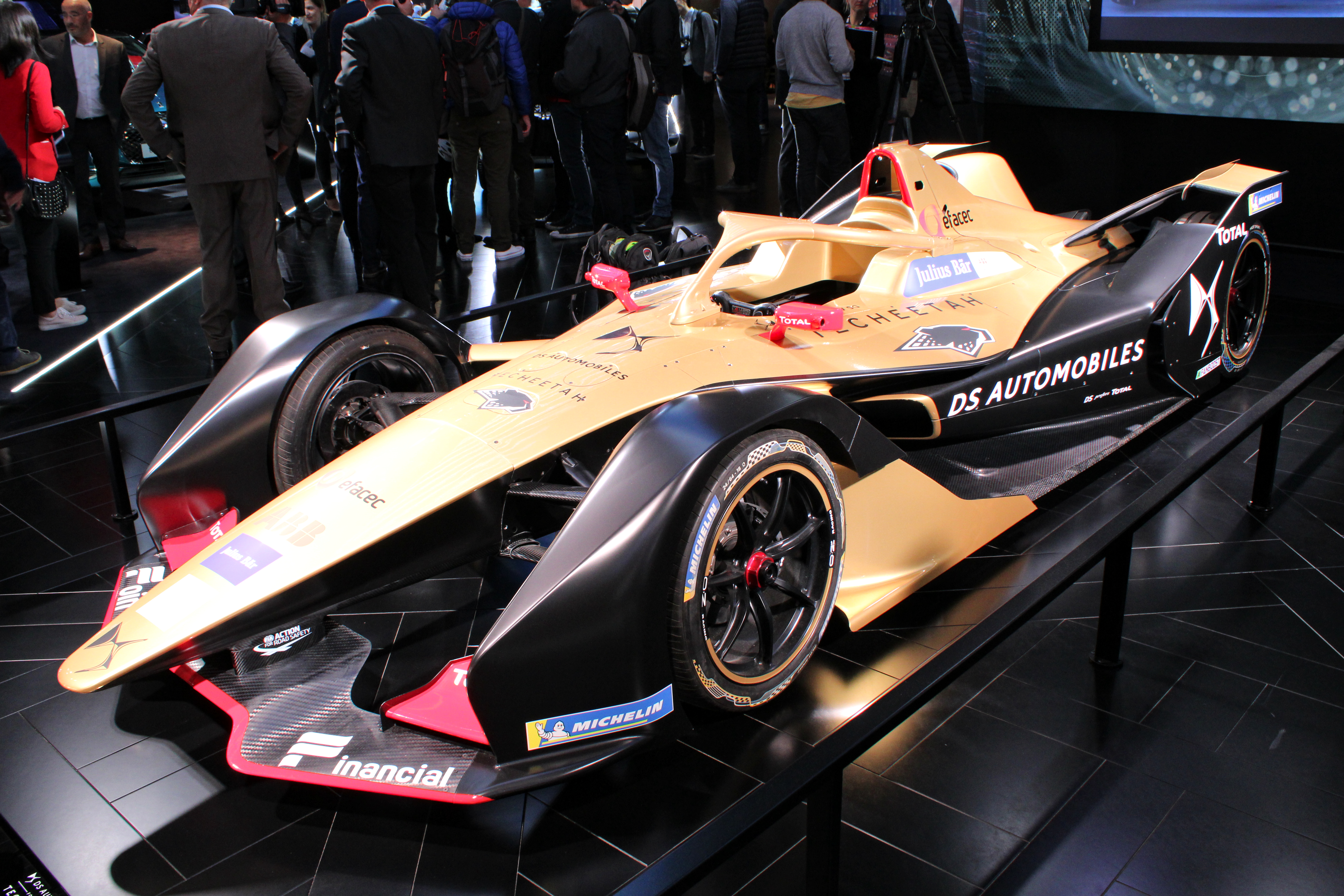
The Spark SRT05e (pictured in black and gold Techeetah livery at the 2018 Paris Motor Show) made its Formula E competition debut in the Ad Diriyah ePrix.

The race saw the introduction of a brand new car to replace the Spark-Renault SRT 01E that had been used since Formula E began in 2014. The new car, the Spark SRT05e (or "Gen2"), eschews the conventional design of having a rear wing in favour of incorporating aerodynamic elements into the chassis and floor and features the halo for driver head protection. It was also designed to last the entire race due to a new McLaren Applied Technologies designed battery, eliminating the need for mid-race car switches. Cars will have a series of pre-set power modes introduced to encourage strategic racing without allowing a team to gain a competitive advantage through powertrain development. In a further regulation change, the maximum power permitted to be used by each driver during the race increased from 180 kW (240 hp) to 200 kW (270 hp) and up to 250 kW (340 hp) in practice and qualifying.

Also, the championship introduced a system dubbed "attack mode" or "Mario Kart mode" in which drivers received an additional 25 kW (34 hp) of power by driving through a designated area of the circuit off the racing line. The duration of the boost mode and the number of boosts available was decided in advance of a round by the sport's governing body, the Fédération Internationale de l'Automobile (FIA), to stop teams from anticipating its use and incorporating it into race strategy. Furthermore, LED lights embedded into the halo illuminated electric blue when a car enters attack mode and magenta when a driver deploys FanBoost to help television viewers and spectators follow the race easier. In a final change to the regulations, races were no longer be run to a set number of laps. Rather, they lasted 45 minutes with one full lap to be completed once the time limit expired.

=== Driver changes ===
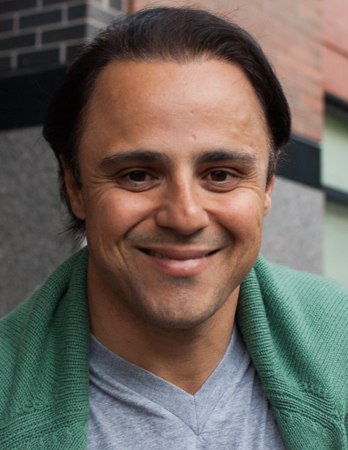
2008 Formula One World Championship runner-up Felipe Massa (pictured in 2017), one of five drivers to debut in Ad Diriyah.

A total of 11 teams of two drivers each for a total of 22 competitors were entered for the ePrix. Heading into the new season, three teams opted to keep the same line-up as they had in the previous season; as several teams changed drivers. One of the main changes involved the début appearance of HWA Racelab with 2015 GP2 Series champion and former McLaren driver Stoffel Vandoorne and two-time Deutsche Tourenwagen Masters champion Gary Paffett. BMW entered Formula E as a manufacturer team with partner Andretti Autosport, employing its development driver Alexander Sims and two-time Macau Grand Prix winner António Félix da Costa. Nissan entered the series to replace its strategic partner Renault in their partnership with racing team DAMS, retaining Sébastien Buemi and employing FIA Formula 2 Championship driver Oliver Rowland to fill in for Nico Prost. (Note: Formula 2 driver Alexander Albon had signed a three-year contract to partner Sebastien Buemi though he drove for Toro Rosso in the 2019 Formula One World Championship.)

Felipe Massa, the 2008 Formula One World Championship runner-up, made his series début with Venturi, partnering two-time Macau Grand Prix winner Edoardo Mortara; Massa took over from 2016 Formula V8 3.5 Series champion Tom Dillmann who in turn moved to NIO to replace the outgoing Luca Filippi. After spending the 2017–18 season out of Formula E, Audi factory driver Robin Frijns joined Virgin to replace Alex Lynn. The final change involved Nick Heidfeld moving to a reserve role at Mahindra as the team signed Jérôme d'Ambrosio (his Dragon car was driven by Formula 2's Maximilian Günther) and 2015 Deutsche Tourenwagen Masters champion Pascal Wehrlein to be their drivers. Wehrlein was prohibited by his Mercedes-Benz contract to race for another team until 31 December 2018, so Felix Rosenqvist drove in his final event before going to the IndyCar Series in 2019. Defending series champion Jean-Éric Vergne stayed at DS Techeetah after his title-winning campaign and he was again joined by three-time 24 Hours of Le Mans winner André Lotterer.

=== Preparations for the race ===
The first meeting to discuss a potential Saudi Arabian Formula E race was held on 14 December 2017 with presentations and proposals discussed with series officials such as CEO Alejandro Agag. On 17 May 2018, it was officially announced the series was set to race its all-electric single seater racing cars in the kingdom's capital of Riyadh's Al Diriyah district. A 10-year contract was signed 12 days beforehand by its General Sports Authority and the Saudi Arabian Motor Federation to be the series' season-opening round. Saudi Arabian authorities were also granted permission to bar another Middle Eastern ePrix as part of its agreement with Formula E. It was officially confirmed as part of the 2018–19 Championship by the FIA World Motor Sport Council in October 2018 and took place on 15 December. The race is part of the Saudi Vision 2030 plan that seeks to diversify Saudi Arabia's economy away from oil exports and into developing public service sectors. Prior to the ePrix, the first in the Middle East, Riyadh hosted the 2018 Race of Champions, which former Formula One driver David Coulthard won.

The layout of the 21-turn 2.847 km (1.769 mi) Riyadh Street Circuit was unveiled in a public ceremony at the Diriyah Governorate on 25 September 2018. The track's design, overseen by contractor Samer Issa-El-Khour, features a number of flowing corners and high-speed turns and few 90-degrees corners atypical of Formula E street circuits. The existing road network was upgraded to comply with FIA standards, with construction performed in close collaboration with UNESCO and the Diriyah Gate Development Authority to ensure the area's heritage was conserved for future generations. D'Ambrosio spoke of his belief the track's sweeping corners would be the main objective to setting a fast lap time and the race would be about electrical energy management, "This is definitely not a classic Formula E track that we have used before, especially all the way from turn 1 to turn 14 which will be a lot of part-throttle and high speed for Formula E."

=== Concerns about human rights ===
Following the initial announcement of its inauguration, the race was subject to criticism by Formula E members and outside observers in light of Saudi Arabia's human rights record regarding its treatment of women, minorities and migrant workers, its oil wealth and dependency, and other major geopolitical problems. In response to these concerns, Agag revealed the Saudi Arabian authorities requested women to participate in the weekend's racing activities and were granted dispensation to report on and spectate the race, "We are happy to be part of that change and we see Formula E as a force for good and in this case is a very specific place under very specific circumstances, but we think Formula E can make a contribution also for good in that country by doing this.”

After the assassination of The Washington Post columnist Jamal Khashoggi in the Consulate of Saudi Arabia in the Turkish capital of Istanbul in October 2018, Agag told the Associated Press the Ad Diriyah ePrix would proceed as scheduled and stated Formula E would monitor the situation, "Referring to the incident, we obviously have no comment to make. At this moment there are no plans to change the Formula E calendar this season."

=== Post-race test session ===
The first in-season test session of the season was held at the circuit the day after the race. Teams were permitted six hours of running divided into two sessions and were allowed to field one or two cars. As part of an FIA Women in Motorsport initiative, teams were encouraged to field female drivers due to Saudi Arabia lifting its restriction on barring women from driving in the kingdom in June 2018. Nine women tested: Sauber's test driver Tatiana Calderón, Italian F4 Championship participant Amna Al Qubaisi, Jaguar I-Pace eTrophy's Katherine Legge, 2015 British GT4 champion Jamie Chadwick, IndyCar Series' Pippa Mann, BMW junior driver Beitske Visser, Supercars Championship competitor Simona de Silvestro, former GP3 Series participant Carmen Jordá, and GT racer Carrie Schreiner. (Note: Schreiner replaced FIA Formula 3 European Championship driver Sophia Flörsch who fractured her spine in a heavy accident during the 2018 Macau Grand Prix.)

== Shakedown ==
A half an hour shakedown session was held on Friday afternoon to allow teams to check the efficiency and reliability of their cars at reduced speed. Sam Bird and Massa stopped during the session; Bird continued and Massa pulled over to the side of the circuit to end his session early. After shakedown, several drivers praised the circuit's challenge. Paffett explained its elevation changes were greater than had been expected from pre-race simulations, Dillmann compared it to the Suzuka Circuit. and Rosenqvist likened it to the Circuito Cittadino dell'EUR, "Just surviving the track is going to be an achievement itself." Félix da Costa opined the most likely areas for overtakes on the narrow circuit away from turn 18 were the final and first corners.

Concerns were raised about the attack mode activation zone positioned on the track's right-hand side leaving turn 17, which required drivers to take a tighter line than normal and reduce their speed on the racing line in order to enter the area and drive near the barrier. Vergne spoke of his feeling the zone was too close to the corner's exit, while Jaguar's Mitch Evans argued it should have been placed 50 m (160 ft) further along the track. Dillmann argued drivers could lose up to two seconds of time and they would activate the system under safety car conditions. Félix da Costa said he felt the differing speed within the racing line was dangerous. Despite the criticism, the FIA did not initially consider altering or moving the zone because of a perceived limit of alternative areas.

== Free practice ==
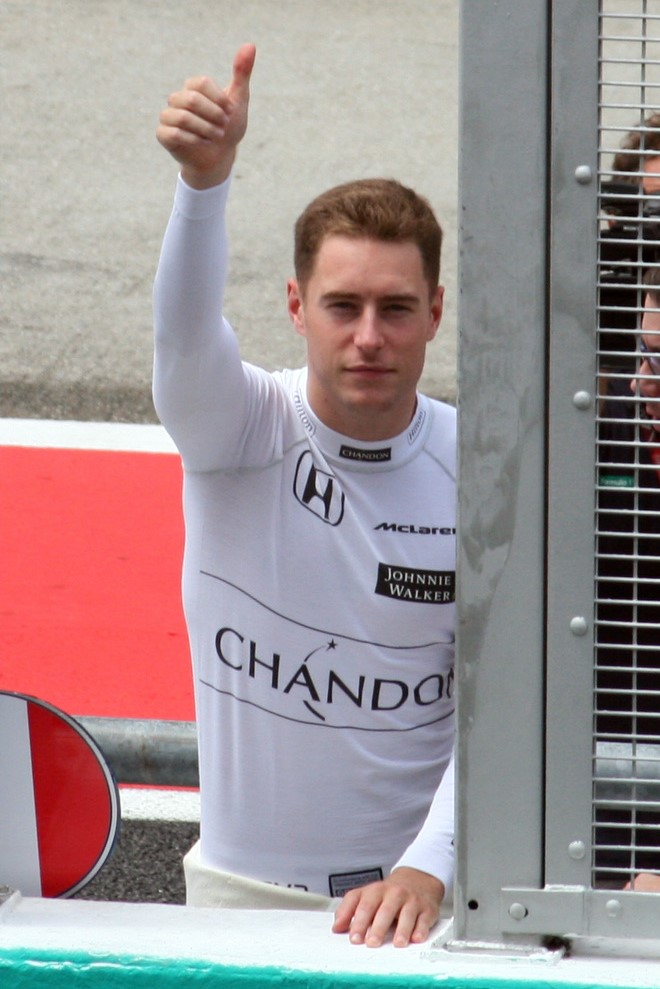
Stoffel Vandoorne (pictured in 2017) set the fastest lap time in the restructured practice session

Two practice sessions—both on Saturday morning—were scheduled to be held before the late afternoon race. The first session was scheduled to run for 45 minutes and the second was due to last half an hour. Torrential rain fell in Riyadh overnight and returned when the first practice session was about to begin. The FIA delayed and later cancelled first practice 20 minutes after its commencement because the weather did not improve and track marshals had too much standing water to clear and pump away. Particular water drainage problems emerged at turns eight, ten, eleven and seventeen due to the temporary erection of barriers, which created a lack of drainage and caused rivers to collate across the circuit due to the natural undulations in those areas. To compensate for the loss of on-track driving, the FIA planned for the second practice session to last for an hour from 08:35 to 09:35 Arabia Standard Time (UTC+03:00) rather than the scheduled half an hour to provide drivers with an opportunity for track familiarisation before qualifying.

However, heavy rain continued to fall and the FIA delayed second practice before cancelling it 25 minutes after its planned start because the clearing of deep standing water with course vehicles capable of pumping water failed to improve track conditions. Bird accompanied FIA race director Scot Elkins in a course car for a reconnaissance lap and a track inspection. When the two returned to the pit lane, several drivers, including Vergne, Audi's Lucas di Grassi and Buemi congregated to discuss the situation and its impact on the race. Vergne proposed a hybrid-practice session where drivers would simultaneously set laps with the maximum amount of available power reduced from 250 kW (340 hp) to determine the starting order. Other drivers supported Vergne's proposal because of a lack of preparation in the changeable weather. It was also suggested the Jaguar I-Pace eTrophy cars circulate the track to dry it because of the sport utility vehicle's increased ride height compared to Formula E machinery.

A 35-minute practice period was followed soon after by a two-group qualifying session. Most drivers remained in the garage bar Vergne who ventured outside to observe the weather. Drivers then spent five minutes (three laps) at reduced speed behind the safety car to gather knowledge on how the Spark SRT05e handled on a saturated circuit before green flag conditions. Frijns set a benchmark lap, before a 17-minute red flag was necessitated as a brake-by-wire problem sent Mortara into the turn one TecPro energy absorbing barrier. The session resumed with ten minutes to go and lap times lowered. Vergne, Bird, Rowland and Evans all led until Vandoorne set the overall fastest lap of 1 minute, 18.868 seconds, followed by Bird, Buemi, Rowland, Evans, Vergne, Sims, Félix da Costa, Günther and Audi's Daniel Abt. With more than a minute left, Rosenqvist made an error and hit the turn one wall at low speed with damage to his car's nose cone. Massa drove straight to avoid hitting him. One of Rosenqvist's wheel arches detached on the main straight linking turns 17 and 18 on the way back to the pit lane.

== Qualifying ==
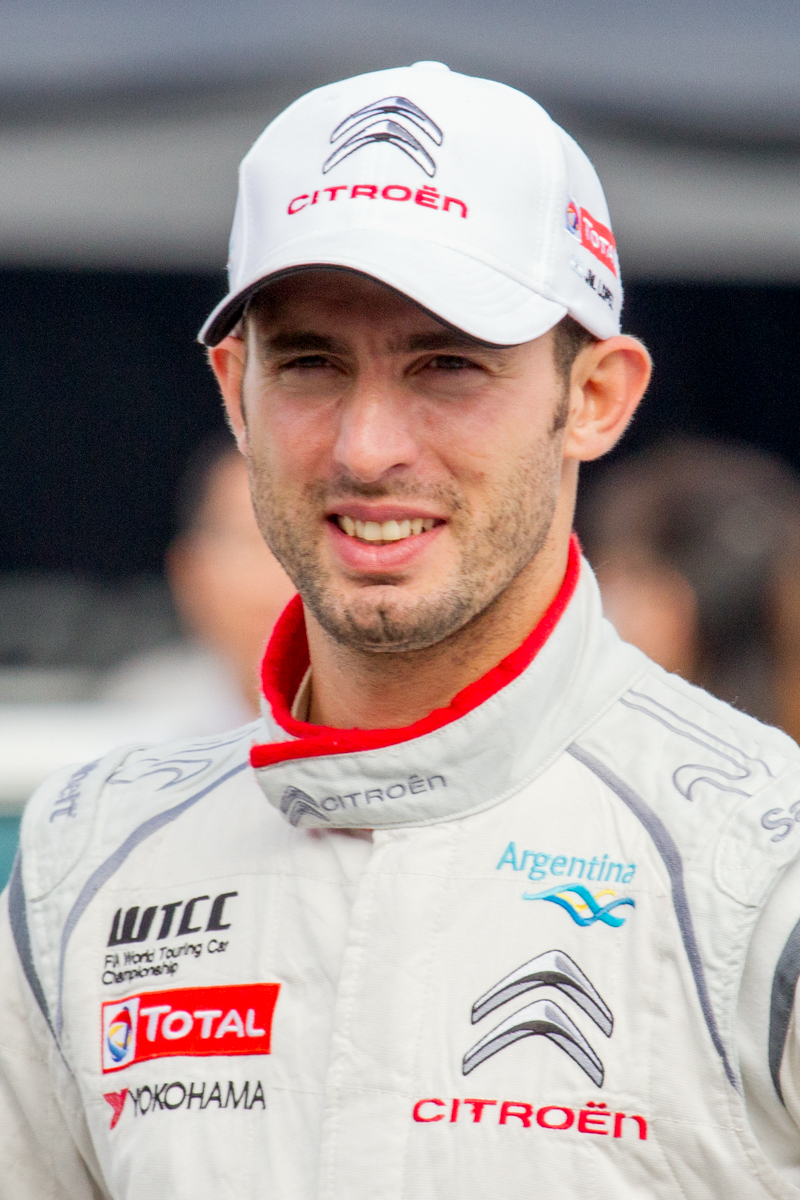
José María López (pictured in 2014) started on the front row of the grid after the application of penalties.

Saturday morning's half an hour qualifying session was divided into two groups of eleven cars rather than the customary four of either five or six. Each group was permitted 15 minutes of on-track activity and all drivers were limited to a single timed lap at 250 kW (340 hp). The starting order was determined by the combined fastest overall lap times from both groups. The driver and team who recorded the pole position lap time were awarded three points towards their respective championships. Félix da Costa took the first pole position of his career with a 1-minute, 17.728 seconds lap. (Note: Félix da Costa was fastest in qualifying for the 2016 Long Beach ePrix but his pole position lap was nullified because of a tyre irregularity.) Dillmann was the first driver to circulate the track; he spent the first ten minutes recording multiple lap times at 200 kW (270 hp) of power and set the second-fastest time. He was investigated for completing more qualifying laps than permitted due to the amended schedule confusing his team. Dragon's José María López was the second driver to record a lap time with five minutes left of group one; he could not better Dillmann's effort and was in provisional third. Buemi took fourth and the highest-placed rookie Vandoorne in fifth was the sole driver in group two to qualify in the top ten. Bird was sixth. Vergne, seventh, complained of car problems. Frijns, d'Ambrosio and Lotterer completed the top ten provisional qualifiers with Lotterer 1 1/2 seconds slower than Félix da Costa.

Di Grassi was the fastest driver not to set a top ten lap; he described his car as "undriveable". Evans was the faster of the two Jaguars in 12th. 13th-placed Rowland was an early second group pace setter but he made minor contact with the turn one barrier during his maximum power lap, and Oliver Turvey of NIO was 14th-quickest. An error on his best lap put Paffett 15th. Following him on the provisional starting grid were Mortara, Sims, Abt, Massa and Nelson Piquet Jr. of Jaguar. 21st-placed Günther scraped a barrier lining the track with the left-front of his car and qualifying was stopped with four minutes left in the second group after he parked at turn seven and had to be extricated by a recovery vehicle. Rosenqvist was slowest overall because he lost control of his car and struck the outside barrier at the edge of turn 21 at high speed. With Rosenqvist stranded, a track marshal created confusion by waving a red flag; race control did not officially deploy it.

=== Post-qualifying ===
Following deliberation in the pre-race driver meeting, the attack mode activation zone was moved 23 m (75 ft) closer to the start line and painted white lines indicating the zone's beginning and exit points were enlarged for improved visibility. Seven drivers received grid penalties: Dillmann had all of his qualifying laps invalidated for exceeding the maximum amount of permitted laps and his car lacked a data logger sensor. His teammate Turvey also had all of his timed laps cancelled for having no data logger sensor. The two Virgin teammates of Frijns and Bird, di Grassi and Rowland had all of their fastest qualifying times deleted for exceeding 250 kW (340 hp) due to a power overshoot from hitting a trackside bump. Mortara was issued a three-place grid penalty because Venturi had transgressed Formula E's 2018–19 Championship battery software implementation guide. Hence, the grid lined up after penalties as Félix da Costa, López, Buemi, Vandoorne, Vergne, d'Ambrosio, Lotterer, Evans, Paffett, Sims, Abt, Massa, Mortara, Rowland, Piquet, Günther, Rosenqvist, di Grassi, Bird, Frijns, Turvey and Dillmann.

=== Qualifying classification ===
Final qualifying classification
Pos.	No.	Driver	Team	Time	Gap	Grid
1	28	(Portugal) António Félix da Costa	Andretti-BMW	1:17.728	—	1
2	7	(Argentina) José María López	Dragon-Penske	1:18.113	+0.385	2
3	23	(Switzerland) Sébastien Buemi	e.dams-Nissan	1:18.269	+0.541	3
4	5	(Belgium) Stoffel Vandoorne	HWA-Venturi	1:18.490	+0.762	4
5	25	(France) Jean-Éric Vergne	Techeetah-DS	1:18.571	+0.843	5
6	64	(Belgium) Jérôme d'Ambrosio	Mahindra	1:19.077	+1.349	6
7	36	(Germany) André Lotterer	Techeetah-DS	1:19.317	+1.589	7
8	20	(New Zealand) Mitch Evans	Jaguar	1:19.712	+1.984	8
9	17	(United Kingdom) Gary Paffett	HWA-Venturi	1:19.929	+2.201	9
10	48	(Switzerland) Edoardo Mortara	Venturi	1:20.330	+2.602	13^{4}
11	27	(United Kingdom) Alexander Sims	Andretti-BMW	1:20.367	+2.639	10
12	66	(Germany) Daniel Abt	Audi	1:20.385	+2.657	11
13	19	(Brazil) Felipe Massa	Venturi	1:20.407	+2.679	12
14	22	(United Kingdom) Oliver Rowland	e.dams-Nissan	1:20.849^{3}	+3.121	14
15	3	(Brazil) Nelson Piquet Jr.	Jaguar	1:21.489	+3.761	15
16	6	(Germany) Maximilian Günther	Dragon-Penske	1:21.883	+4.155	16
17	94	(Sweden) Felix Rosenqvist	Mahindra	1:23.037	+5.309	17
18	11	(Brazil) Lucas di Grassi	Audi	1:25.104^{3}	+7.376	18
19	2	(United Kingdom) Sam Bird	Virgin-Audi	1:29.625^{3}	+11.897	19
20	4	(Netherlands) Robin Frijns	Virgin-Audi	1:31.566^{3}	+13.838	20
21	16	(United Kingdom) Oliver Turvey	NIO	ㄧ^{2}	一	21
22	8	(France) Tom Dillmann	NIO	一^{1},^{2}	一	22

Notes

- ^1 — Tom Dillmann had all of his lap times deleted because he exceeded the maximum amount of permitted qualifying laps
- ^2 — Oliver Turvey and Tom Dillmann's lap times were invalidated for a missing data logger sensor.
- ^3 — Robin Frijns, Sam Bird, Lucas di Grassi and Oliver Rowland's best lap times were deleted for exceeding 250 kW (340 hp) of power.
- ^4 — Edoardo Mortara incurred a three-place grid penalty after his team Venturi transgressed Formula E's 2018–19 Championship battery software implementation guide.

== Race ==
The race began before a crowd of about 23,000 people at 15:05 local time. The weather at the start were dry and clear with the track slippery and damp but drying. The air temperature was between 17.60 and 17.95 °C (63.68 and 64.31 °F) and the track temperature ranged from 21.1 and 21.7 °C (70.0 and 71.1 °F); forecasts indicated a 20 per cent chance of rain. Each driver was mandated to use the attack mode twice and were permitted to arm the system no more than five times. A special feature of Formula E is the "Fan Boost" feature, an additional 25 kW (34 hp) power to use during the race's second half. The five drivers who were allowed to use the boost were determined by a fan vote. For the Ad Diriyah ePrix, Félix da Costa, Vandoorne, Massa, Abt and di Grassi were handed the extra power. Before the lights went on for the start, Félix da Costa overshot his starting slot because he looked away from pole position. He reversed to ensure he was in the correct position but was skewed at an angle towards the left-hand side barrier and risked locking his rear tires. Nevertheless, Félix da Costa held the lead into the first turn as Buemi overtook the poor-starting López.

Vandoorne was passed by Vergne for fourth as Rowland appeared to jump the start but he was not investigated. While the majority of the field avoided a first lap incident, Mortara locked his brakes and crashed straight into the turn one right-hand side TecPro energy absorbing barrier. He reversed to complete almost an entire lap and entered the pit lane for a replacement front wing. This created confusion with track marshals at the turn who felt a full course fellow flag was necessary to recover Mortara's car; they later discovered the procedure was not officially activated as Mortara had left the area. It came as Lotterer steered right to pass d'Ambrosio for sixth entering turn 18. D'Ambrosio made contact with the rear of Lotterer's car with minimal damage to it. That prompted Massa to pass Paffett and Abt on their right on the entry to the final turn for tenth. Further back, Abt overtook Paffett for 11th and Günther was passed by the Virgin duo of Bird and Frijns and fell to 17th. Piquet got ahead of Paffett for 13th on the straight entering turn 18 on lap two as Vandoorne fell to seventh when Lotterer and d'Ambrosio overtook him.

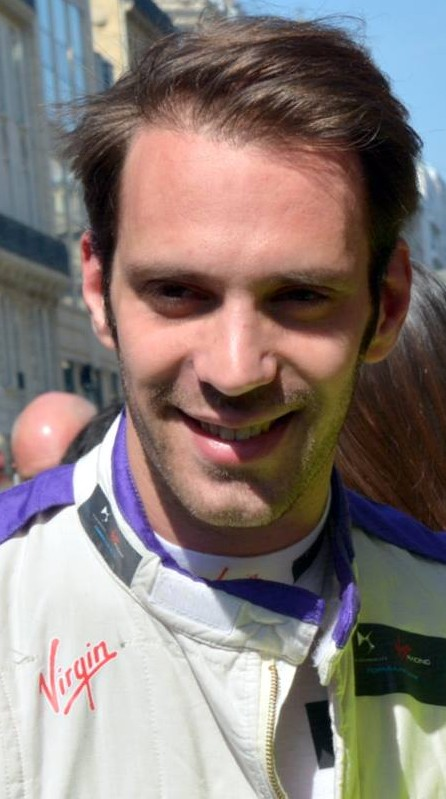
Jean-Éric Vergne (pictured in 2016) lost his chance of the victory after incurring a drive-through penalty for overusing electrical power.

On lap three, Vergne pressured López for third. He tried to pass him into turn 18 but López turned right to block him. He did succeed on the next lap and Lotterer also got ahead of López for fourth soon after. Both Techeetahs battled for third as Félix da Costa opened up a two-second advantage over Buemi. It concluded when Lotterer ran wide on the left through turn 17 on the sixth lap. He then held off López on his right entering the next corner. Doing this dropped López into d'Ambrosio's clutches, who was not close enough to affect a pass. In the meantime, Turvey and his teammate Dillmann used the attack mode in an attempt to advance through the field with 34 minutes to go. On his eighth lap, Rosenqvist retired with a rear transmission failure. During the following lap, Buemi was out-braked by Vergne on the outside at turn 18 for second. An error from Paffett put him off the racing line between turns eight and nine and he collided with a barrier and retired on lap ten. On lap 11, Massa overtok Vandoorne on the right for ninth.

As Vergne began to draw closer to Félix da Costa, Lotterer turned left to pass Buemi for third at turn 18 on the next lap. Vergne moved to within passing distance of Félix da Costa on the 13th lap. He almost took the lead when the latter ran wide at turn 17 and waited for another lap. The two ran close by each other through lap 14 until Vergne overtook the defensive Félix da Costa on his left at turn 18 for the lead. On lap 17, Abt used the attack mode to try a pass on Rowland but the latter kept tenth by driving onto the corner's run-off area. Buemi held off López on the left for fourthon the following lap entering turn 18 and prevented stopped d'Ambrosio from passing. That prompted López to be more aggressive on the left at the same turn on lap 19 and passed Buemi that time round. Buemi ran wide leaving the next corner and allowed d'Ambrosio past for fifth. Lotterer used the attack mode to pass Félix da Costa on the straight linking the final and first turns for second at the start of the 22nd lap.

At this point, it appeared Techeetah would finish 1–2, until Vergne and his teammate Lotterer incurred drive-through penalties for exceeding the maximum amount power permitted during electrical energy harvesting because of a software problem that used more electrical energy beyond the level defined in the FIA suppliers' implementation guide, a transgression of Formula E's sporting regulations. This eroded Vergne's 2.7 second lead and he fell to fifth and Lotterer dropped to seventh and lost 20 seconds of time. Hence, Félix da Costa retook the lead with López second and d'Ambrosio third. Massa and Sims were also issued drive-through penalties for the same infraction as the Techeetahs. On lap 24, López failed to earn the extra amount of power because he missed the attack zone and lost second to d'Ambrosio. He tried again on the next lap and again missed the attack zone. López fell to fifth, behind Buemi and Vergne. He damaged his rear suspension which left him fighting for control of his car until its rear-left wishbone collapsed on a kerb. López retired at the exit to turn 14.

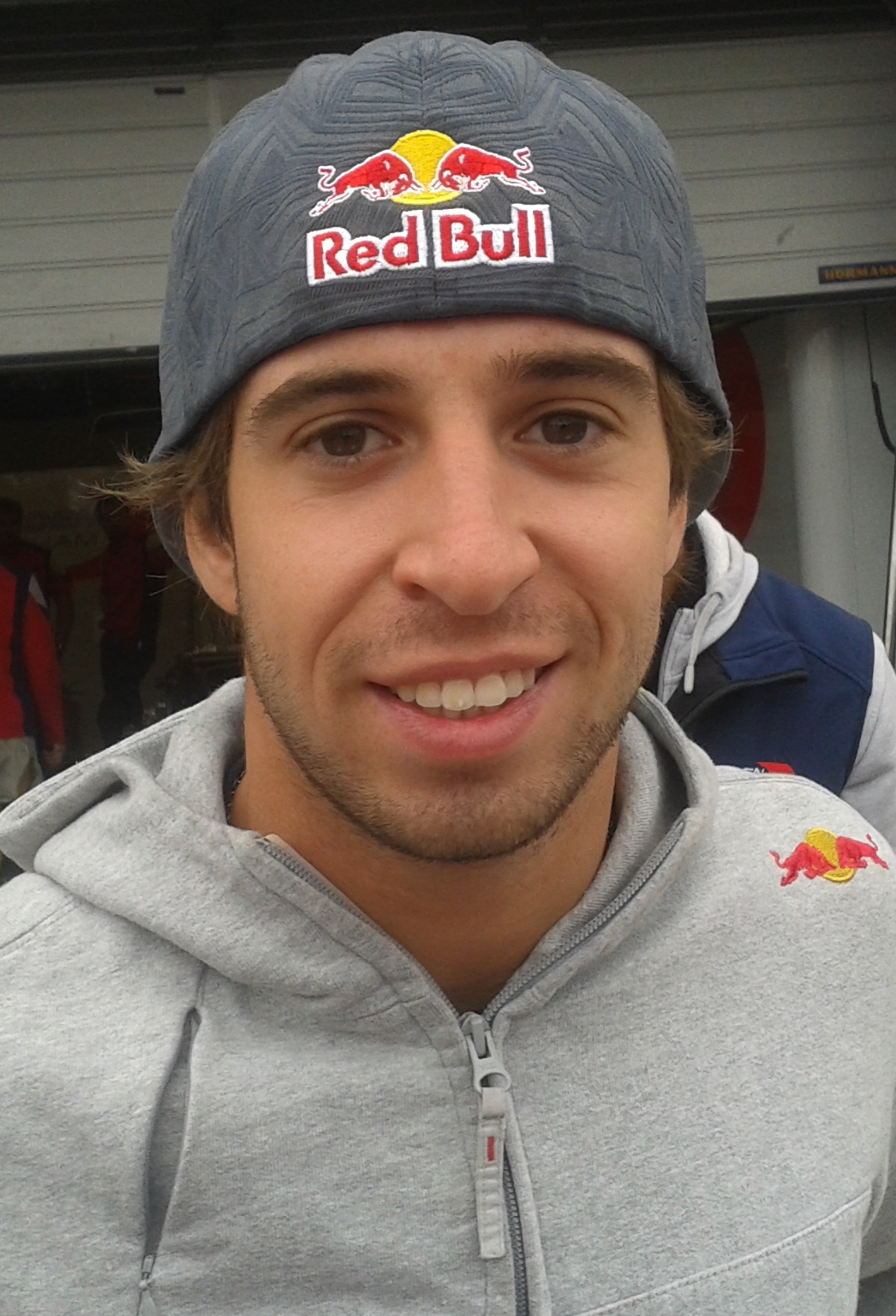
António Félix da Costa (pictured in 2013) took the second victory of his career and his first since the 2015 Buenos Aires ePrix.

Elkins deployed a brief full course yellow flag and later the safety car to allow López's car to be extricated by a recovery vehicle. He had considered using a system to dictate the field to close up to the leader. Félix da Costa immediately activated his first attack mode as the safety car circulated the track for three laps (five minutes). Shortly before racing continued for four laps after the safety car's withdrawal, nine drivers, including Félix da Costa and Vergne, strategically used the attack mode for a second time. The disruption to proceedings allowed all to drive at full speed until the end' some opined there was no electrical energy limitations in all circumstances. Félix da Costa led d'Ambrosio and Vergne at the lap 30 restart. That lap, Vergne passed d'Ambrosio on the main straight for second. Buemi had less usable electrical energy and lost sixth to Evans and Lotterer on laps 30 and 31. On the 32nd lap, Félix da Costa used his FanBoost to increase his lead over Vergne. During the lap, Piquet ran into the left-hand quarter of di Grassi's car as the former passed him for ninth into turn 18. Lotterer earned one championship point for setting the fastest lap on lap 32, a 1-minute, 12.591 seconds.

Félix da Costa led Vergne by 1.507 seconds at the start of the final lap as the latter closed up to provide himself with an opportunity for a last-lap pass. Although Félix da Costa achieved a good exit out of turn 17, it did not dissuade Vergne from an unsuccessful out-braking manoeuvre that saw him lock his brakes. Thus, Félix da Costa held the lead for the final three corners to claim his second career victory, his first since the 2015 Buenos Aires ePrix and BMW's maiden Formula E win by 0.462 seconds over Vergne. D'Ambrosio finished third despite nursing diffuser damage from his earlier contact with Lotterer. Evans took fourth, Lotterer fifth, and the Nissans of Buemi and Rowland were sixth and seventh. The Audi duo of Abt and di Grassi took eighth and ninth and Piquet completed the top ten. The last of the classified finishers were the Virgin duo of Bird and Frijns, NIO teammates Turvey and Dillmann, Günther, Vandoorne, Massa (who received two-post race penalties for using his FanBoost earlier than allowed and for using 150 kW (200 hp) of energy rather than 100 kW (130 hp) while on FanBoost and incurred one e-licence penalty point), Sims and Mortara. The attrition rate was low, with 19 of the 22 starters finishing the race.

=== Post-race ===
"I was far from giving up – I'm a fighter, after all. But it's hard – I'm also a winner and I hate to lose. To finally do it today, is just amazing... the DAC is back!"

— António Félix da Costa talking about his performance in the previous three seasons after the event.

The top three drivers appeared on the podium to collect their trophies and spoke to the media in a later press conference. Félix da Costa spoke of his happiness over his win and called it "a perfect start" to the season, "When I crossed the line I was happy obviously but I was just assimilating everything. It was when I saw everyone’s faces and felt all the emotion from the rest of the guys that it all really came to me." Vergne said his second-place result was "a taster of what is to come from Techeetah" and aimed for more podium results and his first win of the season, "I’m confident that we will continue to deliver some very exciting racing for the rest of the championship. We’re going to absorb all the lessons, continue in this spirit and come back for more." D'Ambrosio said of his third-place finish, "I come also from two difficult years so it’s great to start this new relationship with the team in this way. We’ve worked really hard over the past few months to be ready and I think we were really fast and good in race pace. I’m really happy to be a part of such a great team – there are loads of great people and a great atmosphere."

After retiring from a suspension failure, López spoke of his belief he lost the chance to finish on the podium. He hoped to maintain his pace at the season's next race in Marrakesh, "If we keep it, we’re going to be fighting the next race, so I really hope so. I know that we’re privateers, the outsiders but the truth today is that we were competitive. There were many positives today and we take more confidence now going in to Marrakesh." Evans had mixed feelings over coming fourth; he said he had a considered approach, which enabled him to compete in the top five with drivers such as Buemi, d'Ambrosio and López, "It was a strong race and a good one especially after the bad luck in quali. A bucket-load of points is a good start and we’ll take that at this early stage but to be so close to the podium is a little bittersweet." Buemi stated that he was disappointed by finishing sixth because of a lack of speed after running in second early on, "I could not fight the [Techeetahs]. I just did the best I could to lose the least amount of time but I was not in their league to be honest."

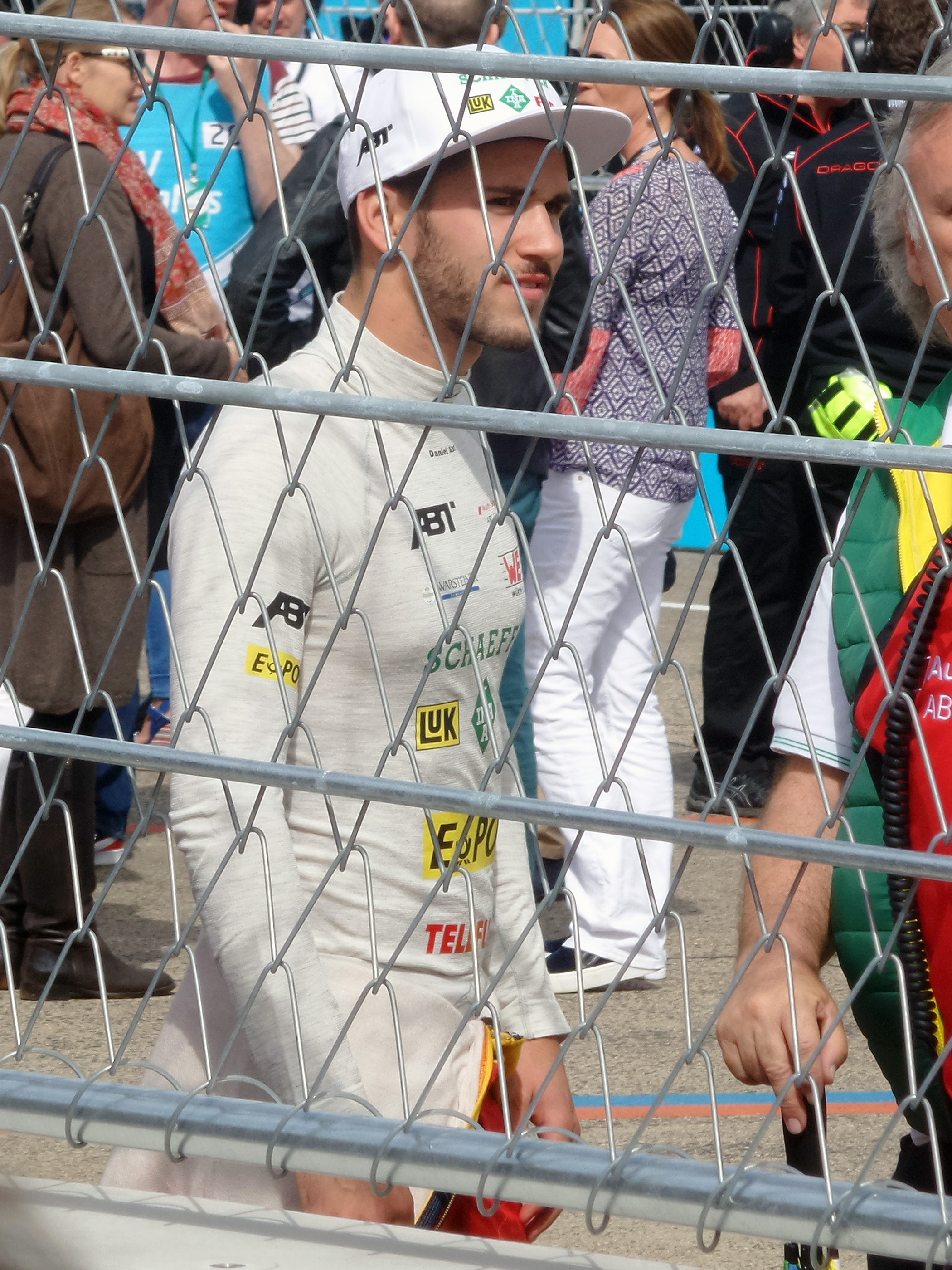
Daniel Abt (pictured in 2015) argued that the attack mode concept should have its power increased to allow for more effective overtaking

Media reception to the race was mixed. Writing for The Guardian, Richard Williams said the race demonstrated Formula E did not need to follow Formula One's example of the heavy imposition of penalties as it tried to showcase it was different from internal combustion motor racing. He also complimented the driving on the circuit, "although it was an entertaining spectacle, the rules farrago towards the end was the last thing the formula needs". Journalist Maurice Hamilton of ESPN wrote the ePrix reminded him of Hans Christian Andersen's The Emperor's New Clothes in that it had "a similar impression of delusion appeared to infiltrate enthusiastic media and TV summaries referring to a 'brilliant race'" and that it did little to arouse deep emotion because the circuit appeared to him as "weaving through a building site thanks to the impression of high screens blanking off construction work".

Views on the attack mode were mixed. Abt argued the attack mode was like "a lose mode" because he lost a position activating it and proposed its power be increased to allow for a more effective pass on other drivers. His teammate di Grassi concurred and said he believed there were less strategic possibilities with it. Bird opined that the system should lose drivers around six to eight seconds for better on-track action, "A bit like the joker lap in Rallycross – same sort of concept, only you lose six-eight seconds but you've got more power for the next three laps. Something like that would be cool." Evans said his belief the system was effective but he wanted a good balance of losing and gaining time. Audi team principal Allan McNish considered the attack mode to have offered up unpredictability, "That's never a bad thing because I do believe that overtaking is a skillset a driver needs to have and so therefore we saw some guys doing some pretty strong overtaking manoeuvres." Günther said he felt it was a helpful system for passing and close racing.

Because this was the first race of the season, Félix da Costa led the Drivers' Championship with 28 points (25 for the win and three points for earning the pole position). Vergne was ten points behind him in second and d'Ambrosio was a further three points adrift in third. Evans was fourth with 12 points and Lotterer rounded out the top five with 11 points. In the Teams' Championship, Techeetah became the leader with 29 points picked up from Vergne's and Lotterer's finishing results of second and fifth. Andretti followed in second with 28 points. Mahindra, e.Dams-Nissan and Jaguar made up positions three to five with a point apiece with twelve races left in the season.

=== Race classification ===
Drivers who scored championship points are denoted in bold.

Final race classification
Pos.	No.	Driver	Team	Laps	Time/Retired	Grid	Points
1	**28**	**(Portugal) António Félix da Costa**	**Andretti-BMW**	**33**	**46:29.377**	**1**	25+3^{5}
2	**25**	**(France) Jean-Éric Vergne**	**Techeetah-DS**	**33**	**+0.462**	**5**	18
3	**64**	**(Belgium) Jérôme d'Ambrosio**	**Mahindra**	**33**	**+4.033**	**6**	15
4	**20**	**(New Zealand) Mitch Evans**	**Jaguar**	**33**	**+5.383**	**8**	12
5	**36**	**(Germany) André Lotterer**	**Techeetah-DS**	**33**	**+5.579**	**7**	10+1^{6}
6	**23**	**(Switzerland) Sébastien Buemi**	**e.dams-Nissan**	**33**	**+6.625**	**3**	8
7	**22**	**(United Kingdom) Oliver Rowland**	**e.dams-Nissan**	**33**	**+9.105**	**14**	6
8	**66**	**(Germany) Daniel Abt**	**Audi**	**33**	**+9.819**	**11**	4
9	**11**	**(Brazil) Lucas di Grassi**	**Audi**	**33**	**+10.936**	**18**	2
10	**3**	**(Brazil) Nelson Piquet Jr.**	**Jaguar**	**33**	**+11.564**	**15**	1
**11**	2	(United Kingdom) Sam Bird	Virgin-Audi	33	+11.747	19	
**12**	4	(Netherlands) Robin Frijns	Virgin-Audi	33	+12.189	20	
**13**	16	(United Kingdom) Oliver Turvey	NIO	33	+13.104	21	
**14**	8	(France) Tom Dillmann	NIO	33	+14.273	22	
**15**	6	(Germany) Maximilian Günther	Dragon-Penske	33	+16.161	16	
**16**	5	(Belgium) Stoffel Vandoorne	HWA-Venturi	33	+20.013	4	
**17**	19	(Brazil) Felipe Massa	Venturi	33	+43.610^{7}	12	
**18**	27	(United Kingdom) Alexander Sims	Andretti-BMW	33	+47.412	10	
**19**	48	(Switzerland) Edoardo Mortara	Venturi	32	+1 Lap	13	
**Ret**	7	(Argentina) José María López	Dragon-Penske	25	Suspension	2	
**Ret**	17	(United Kingdom) Gary Paffett	HWA-Venturi	9	Accident	9	
**Ret**	94	(Sweden) Felix Rosenqvist	Mahindra	8	Driveshaft	17	

Notes

- **^5** — Pole position.
- **^6** — Fastest lap.
- **^7** — Felipe Massa received 5-second time penalty for using FanBoost earlier than allowed and drive through penalty converted into 25-second time penalty for using the system with 150 kW (200 hp) of energy rather than 100 kW (130 hp).

== Standings after the race ==
Drivers' Championship standings

Pos	Driver	Points
1	(Portugal) António Félix da Costa	28
2	(France) Jean-Éric Vergne	18 (−10)
3	(Belgium) Jérôme d'Ambrosio	15 (−13)
4	(New Zealand) Mitch Evans	12 (−16)
5	(Germany) André Lotterer	11 (−17)

Teams' Championship standings

Pos	Constructor	Points
1	(China) DS Techeetah	29
2	(United Kingdom) Andretti-BMW	28 (−1)
3	(India) Mahindra	15 (−14)
4	(France) Nissan e.dams	14 (−15)
5	(United Kingdom) Jaguar	13 (−16)

- Notes: Only the top five positions are included for both sets of standings.

== Notes and references ==
=== References ===
Previous race: 2018 New York City ePrix	FIA Formula E Championship; 2018–19 season	Next race: 2019 Marrakesh ePrix
Previous race: N/A	Ad Diriyah ePrix	Next race: 2019 Diriyah ePrix
