= Rodrigo Sperafico =

Brazilian professional racing driver (born 1979)

- Nationality: (Brazil) Brazilian
- Born: 23 July 1979 (age 47) Toledo, Paraná (Brazil)
- Relatives: Ricardo Sperafico (twin brother); Alexandre Sperafico (cousin); Rafael Sperafico (cousin)

Stock Car Brasil career
- Debut season: 2004
- Current team: JF Racing
- Categorisation: FIA Platinum
- Car number: 19
- Former teams: WB Motorsport; Biosintética Action Power; Terra Racing; RC3 Bassani Racing; Mico's Racing
- Starts: 60
- Wins: 2
- Poles: 3
- Fastest laps: 0
- Best finish: 2nd in 2007

Previous series
- 1997 1998–1999 2000 2001–2002 2003–2004: British Formula Ford; Formula Three Sudamericana; Italian Formula 3000; International Formula 3000; World Series by Nissan

Rodrigo Sperafico (born 23 July 1979) is a Brazilian professional racing driver. He currently drives in the Stock Car Brasil series. He belongs to the Sperafico family of racing drivers, which includes twin brother Ricardo (with whom his career has been closely linked), along with cousins Alexandre and the late Rafael.

== Career ==
=== Formula Ford ===
Sperafico raced in the British Formula Ford Championship in 1997. Driving a Mygale chassis, he finished ninth in the final championship standings, behind Ricardo who finished second and then took third place in the annual Formula Ford Festival.

=== Formula Three ===
The brothers took the unusual step of returning to South America for 1998 by competing in the Formula Three Sudamericana series. On this occasion, Rodrigo fared the better, finishing seventh to Ricardo's ninth. The following year, the pair both raced Dallara chassis for the Amir Nasr Racing team and proved closely matched: Rodrigo and Ricardo improved to third and fourth overall, behind champion Hoover Orsi and runner-up Jaime Melo.

=== Formula 3000 ===
The Speraficos returned to Europe in 2000 to race in the Italian Formula 3000 series. Rodrigo signed for the Draco Junior Team alongside compatriot Leonardo Nienkötter, and finished fourth in the championship with one pole position and three podium finishes to his name. He finished behind Gabriele Lancieri, Warren Hughes and Ricardo, who was the drivers' champion.

For the following year, the brothers switched to the more prestigious International Formula 3000 championship; Rodrigo signed for Coloni alongside the experienced Fabrizio Gollin, whilst Ricardo partnered Antônio Pizzonia at the Super Nova Racing-run Petrobras Junior Team. Whilst Ricardo finished an impressive fifth in the championship, including a win at the Spa-Francorchamps circuit, Rodrigo's season was less successful: although he finished every race he started, he did not score any points, although he lost a potential podium finish at his home race after being penalised for overtaking under yellow flags. He was replaced by Marc Goossens after nine of the calendar's twelve races after his sponsorship deal ran out.

Sperafico tested for several teams in the off-season period, including Arden and Astromega. However, he eventually signed for the Durango team for the 2002 season, along with Alex Müller (who was later replaced by Derek Hill). He again competed alongside Ricardo, who kept his seat in the Petrobras team, and also on the occasion his cousin Alexandre, who moved up to International F3000 for a part-season with the Coloni-run Minardi junior team. Rodrigo began the championship strongly, winning the first race of the season at his home track of Interlagos, but was fortunate to take the victory as hitherto dominant leader Tomáš Enge suffered a mechanical problem. He then finished a close second to eventual title winner Sébastien Bourdais at the next race in Imola to take the championship lead. Thereafter his campaign faltered through inconsistency, and he took only one further podium finish. He eventually finished sixth in the championship, two points and one position behind Ricardo.

=== World Series by Nissan ===
Sperafico also competed in eight races of the 2002 World Series by Nissan season for the Meycom team, finishing 18th in the championship with twelve points. He failed to retain a drive in F3000 for 2003 and took the year out, before returning to the World Series with the Vergani Racing team for four races of the 2004 season, in which he did not score any points.

=== Stock Car Brasil ===
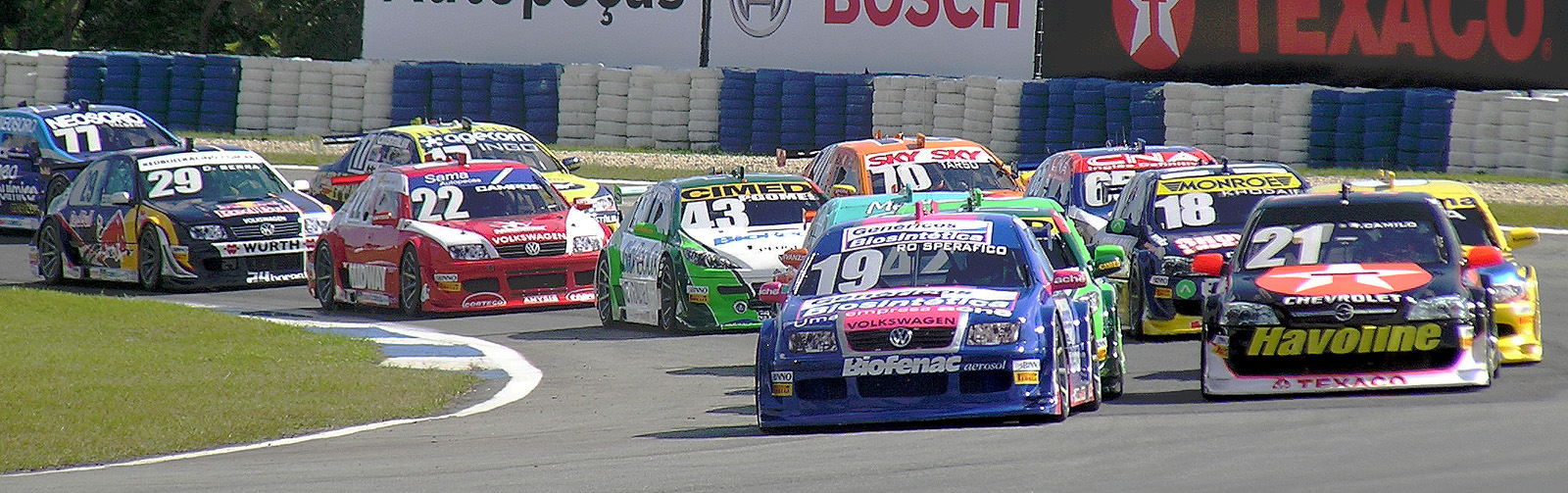
Rodrigo Sperafico on Pole at Curitiba 2007

During 2004, Sperafico moved back to Brazil to drive in the Stock Car Brasil championship, his single-seater career having effectively ended. Driving a part-season, he finished 25th in the championship. The following year, he drove a Chevrolet Astra for the WB Motorsport team, improving to 13th in the standings and taking a podium finish on the way. For 2006, he drove an Astra for JF Racing, and climbed to ninth place overall with three podiums.

For 2007, Sperafico again switched teams to Action Power, who also provided him with a different car, the Volkswagen Bora. He was joined in the series for the first time by Ricardo, who had also moved back to Brazil by this point in his own career. In his strongest season to date, which included three pole positions and two victories, Rodrigo finished runner-up to champion Cacá Bueno. The championship was marred, however, by the death of his cousin Rafael in a Stock Car Light race which supported the final Stock Car Brasil event of the season.

Sperafico moved to a Mitsubishi Lancer run by the Avallone Motorsport in 2008 called Terra Racing team for 2008, but faded to 14th in the championship. He drove a Peugeot 307 for part of the 2009 season, and also competed in the Copa Vicar. He reverted to a Bassani-run Chevrolet Astra for the 2010 season, but could only manage 24th position in the championship after leaving the team after two races, and then missing the next three races before returning to action with the Mico's Racing team.

== Racing record ==
=== Career summary ===
Season	Series	Team name	Races	Poles	Wins	Points	Final Placing
1997	British Formula Ford	?	?	?	?	52	9th
1998	Formula Three Sudamericana	?	?	?	0	79	7th
1999	Formula Three Sudamericana	Amir Nasr Racing	18	4	2	172	**3rd**
2000	Italian Formula 3000	Draco Junior Team	8	1	0	22	4th
2001	International Formula 3000	Coloni F3000	9	0	0	0	NC
2002	International Formula 3000	Durango Formula	12	0	1	20	6th
2002	World Series by Nissan	Repsol Meycom	8	0	0	12	18th
2004	Stock Car Brasil	Katalogo Racing	7	0	0	15	25th
2004	World Series by Nissan	Vergani Racing	4	0	0	0	NC
2005	Stock Car Brasil	WB Motorsport	12	0	0	57	13th
2006	Stock Car Brasil	Neosoro JF Racing	12	0	0	223	9th
2007	Stock Car Brasil	Biosintética Action Power	12	3	2	265	**2nd**
2008	Stock Car Brasil	Terra Racing	11	0	0	45	14th
2009	Stock Car Brasil	RZ Racing	3	0	0	8	26th
2009	Copa Vicar	Carlos Alves Competições	2	1	1	41	12th
2010	Stock Car Brasil	RC3 Bassani Racing	2	0	0	24	24th
2010	Stock Car Brasil	Mico's Racing	6	0	0	24	24th

=== Complete Italian Formula 3000 results ===
(key) (Races in bold indicate pole position; races in italics indicate fastest lap)

Year	Entrant	1	2	3	4	5	6	7	8	DC	Points
2000	Draco Junior Team	VLL; 2	MUG; 6	IMO; 3	MNZ; 3	VLL; 6	DON; 4	PER; 8	MIS; 4	4th	22

=== Complete International Formula 3000 results ===
Year	Entrant	1	2	3	4	5	6	7	8	9	10	11	12	DC	Points
2001	Coloni F3000	INT; 13	IMO; 7	CAT; 22	A1R; 8	MON; 9	NÜR; 12	MAG; 15	SIL; 14	HOC; 8	HUN	SPA	MNZ	NC	0
2002	Durango Formula	INT; 1	IMO; 2	CAT; 7	A1R; 12	MON; Ret	NÜR; 8	SIL; 9	MAG; 8	HOC; 3	HUN; Ret	SPA; 12	MNZ; 8	6th	20

=== Complete World Series by Nissan results ===
Year	Entrant	1	2	3	4	5	6	7	8	9	10	11	12	13	14	15	16	17	18	DC	Points
2002	Repsol-Meycom	VAL; 1	VAL; 2	JAR; 1	JAR; 2	ALB; 1	ALB; 2	MNZ; 1	MNZ; 2	MAG; 1	MAG; 2	CAT; 1; 8	CAT; 2; 10	VAL; 1; 6	VAL; 2; 11	CUR; 1; 14	CUR; 2; 11	INT; 1; 11	INT; 2; 9	18th	12
2004	Vergani Formula	JAR; 1; 11	JAR; 2; 13	ZOL; 1; 11	ZOL; 2; 14	MAG; 1	MAG; 2	VAL; 1	VAL; 2	LAU; 1	LAU; 2	EST; 1	EST; 2	CAT; 1	CAT; 2	VAL; 1	VAL; 2	JER; 1	JER; 2	25th	0

=== Complete Stock Car Brasil results ===
Year	Team	Car	1	2	3	4	5	6	7	8	9	10	11	12	13	14	15	16	17	18	19	20	21	Rank	Points
2004	Katálogo Racing	Chevrolet Astra	CTB	INT	TAR	LON	RIO	INT; 5	CTB; 17	LON; 15	RIO; 21	BSB; 14	CGD; Ret	INT; 20										25th	15
2005	WB Motorsport	Chevrolet Astra	INT; 5	CTB; 5	RIO; 12	INT; Ret	CTB; Ret	LON; 2	BSB; 5	SCZ; Ret	TAR; Ret	ARG; 10	RIO; Ret	INT; 13										13th	57
2006	JF Racing	Chevrolet Astra	INT; 3	CTB; 19	CGD; 17	INT; 23	LON; 21	CTB; 2	SCZ; 2	BSB; 6	TAR; 12	ARG; 32	RIO; 11	INT; 17										9th	223
2007	Biosintetica Racing	Volkswagen Bora	INT; 10	**CTB**; 1	CGD; 18	INT; 10	LON; 11	**SCZ**; Ret	CTB; 15	BSB; 30	ARG; 6	**TAR**; 1	RIO; 7	INT; 4										**2nd**	**265**
2008	Terra-Avallone	Mitsubishi Lancer	INT; 13	BSB; 3	CTB; 13	SCZ; 19	CGD; 15	INT; 23	RIO; 11	LON; 15	CTB; DSQ	BSB; 23	TAR; 8	INT; 8										14th	45
2009	RZ Motorsport	Peugeot 307	INT	CTB	BSB; 19	SCZ; 8	INT	SAL; 17	RIO	CDG	CTB	BSB	TAR	INT										26th	8
2010	RC3 Bassani	Peugeot 307	INT; 6	CTB; Ret	VE	RIO	RBP																	24th	24
2010	Mico's Racing	Peugeot 307						SAL; 16	INT; 8	CGD; 10	LON; Ret	SCZ; DSQ	BSB; 23	CTB; EX										24th	24
2011	JF Racing	Peugeot 408	CTB; 16	INT; 24	RBP; 22	VEL; Ret	CGD; Ret	RIO; 14	INT; 17	SAL; 18	SCZ; 15	LON; 14	BSB; 10	VEL; 7										21st	19
2012	Prati-Mico's Racing	Peugeot 408	INT; 16	CTB; 20	VEL; 11	RBP; 15	LON; 21	RIO; Ret	SAL; 22	CAS; 13	TAR; 29	CTB; 23	BSB; 4	INT; 13										17th	65
2013	Prati-Mico's Racing	Peugeot 408	INT; Ret	CUR; 10	TAR; 14	SAL; 19	BRA; 6	CAS; 21	RBP; 21	CAS; 21	VEL; 13	CUR; 17	BRA; DSQ	INT; 24										23rd	57
2014	Vogel Motorsport	Chevrolet Sonic	INT; 1; 1	SCZ; 1	SCZ; 2	BRA; 1	BRA; 2	GOI; 1	GOI; 2	INT; 1	CAS; 1	CAS; 2	CUR; 1	CUR; 2	VEL; 1	VEL; 2	SAL; 1	SAL; 2	CUR; 1	CUR; 2	TAR; 1	TAR; 2	BRA; 1	NC†	0†

† Ineligible for championship points.
