= Stock Car Pro Series =

Brazilian motor racing series

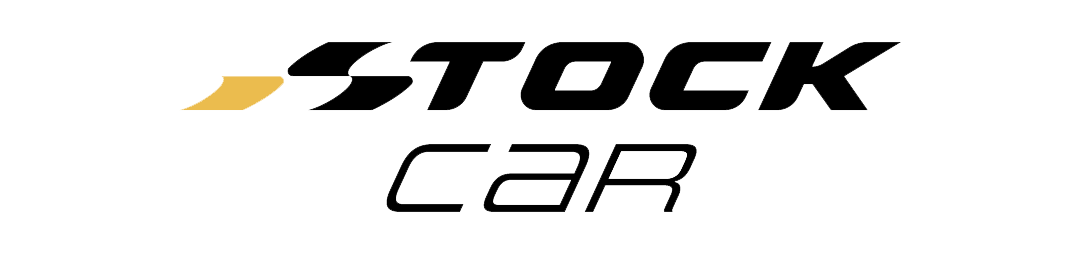
- Category: Touring car racing Stock car racing
- Country: Brazil
- Inaugural season: 1979
- Drivers: 38 (2023)
- Teams: 16 (2023)
- Constructors: Chevrolet; Toyota; Mitsubishi
- Tyre suppliers: Hankook
- Drivers' champion: Felipe Fraga
- Teams' champion: Eurofarma RC
- Official website: {{URL|example.com|optional display text}}

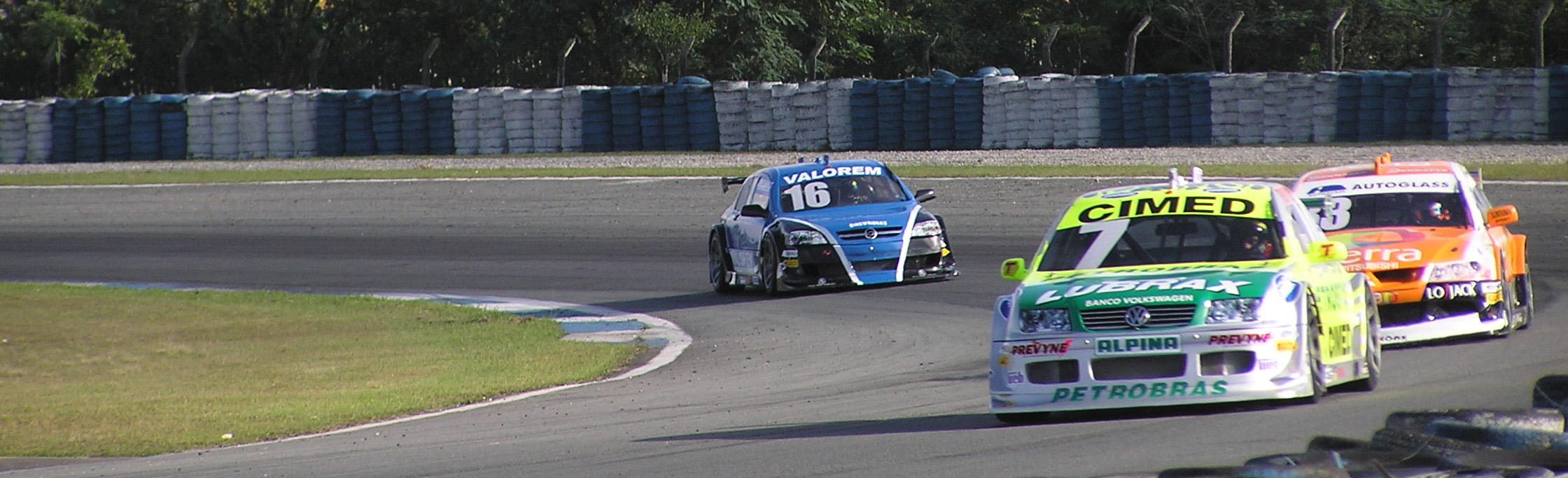
Stock Car Brazil, 2006

The Bradesco Stock Car Pro Series, formerly known as Stock Car Brasil, is a touring car auto racing series based in Brazil organized by Vicar. It is considered the major Brazilian and South American motorsports series. Starting in 1979 with Chevrolet as the only constructor, the series has also seen other constructors joining in and leaving such as Peugeot and Volkswagen, currently the three manufacturers are Chevrolet, Mitsubishi and Toyota. The competition has seen many internationally famous drivers in its ranks, such as Rubens Barrichello, Felipe Massa, Bruno Junqueira, Lucas di Grassi, Nelson Piquet Jr., Ricardo Zonta and Tony Kanaan. The series is named for its current title sponsor, Banco Bradesco, replacing the former sponsor Banco de Brasília.

It began in 1979 as the Campeonato Brasileiro de Stock Cars, created by General Motors as an alternative to the Division 1 series. From 2005 to 2009, a deal with Nextel gave the series the title of Copa Nextel Stock Car. In 2010, Caixa Econômica Federal signed a three-year title sponsorship deal with Vicar, and the series was renamed to Copa Caixa Stock Car until 2012. Despite its prestige in South America as a whole, the series is largely centered in Brazilian circuits, with the vast majority of races occurring in the country. However, in recent years, Uruguay and Argentina have both held races.

The Stock Series, formerly known as Stock Car Light, serves as the access category to the Pro Series.

== History ==
=== 1970s ===
The series was created in 1979 as an alternative to the former Division 1 championship that competed with Chevrolet Opala and Ford Maverick. The dominance of Chevrolet over Ford models was causing a lack of public interest and sponsors. General Motors then created a new category, with a name reminiscent of the famous NASCAR with standardized performance and components for all competitors. The first race was run on 22 April 1979 at the Autódromo Internacional de Tarumã, Rio Grande do Sul with 19 cars competing, all of them being 6-cylinder Chevrolet Opalas. The pole position was held by José Carlos Palhares, and the race was won by Affonso Giaffone.

=== 1980s ===
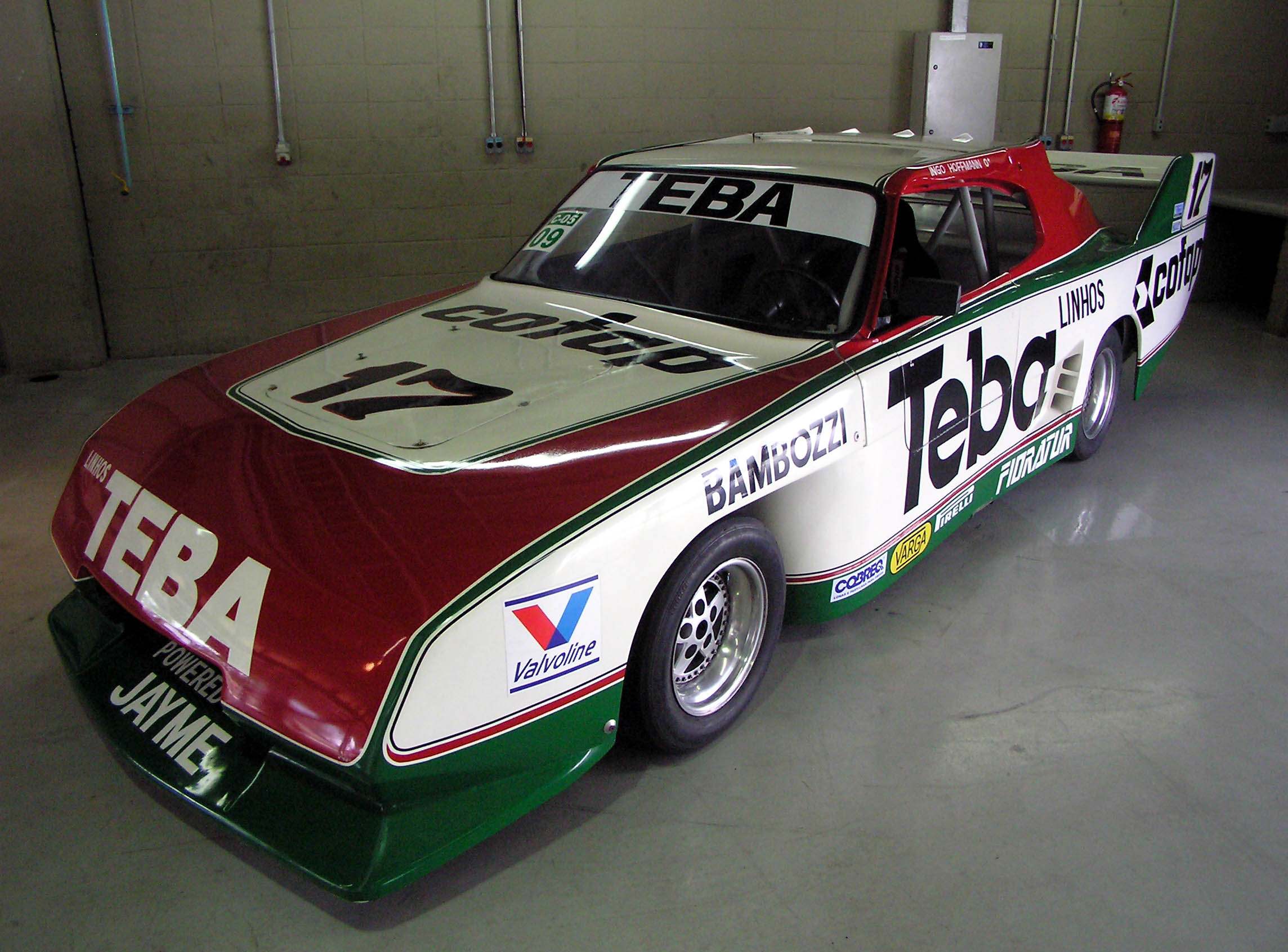
Chevrolet Opala 1987–1989

This decade saw the emergence of several rivalries between drivers.

The first major change in the Stock Car standard occurred in 1987. With the support of General Motors, a fairing designed and built by coachbuilder Caio was adopted, which was adapted to the Opala's chassis. The car exhibited improved aerodynamics and performance. Safety equipment become more sophisticated.

=== 1990s ===
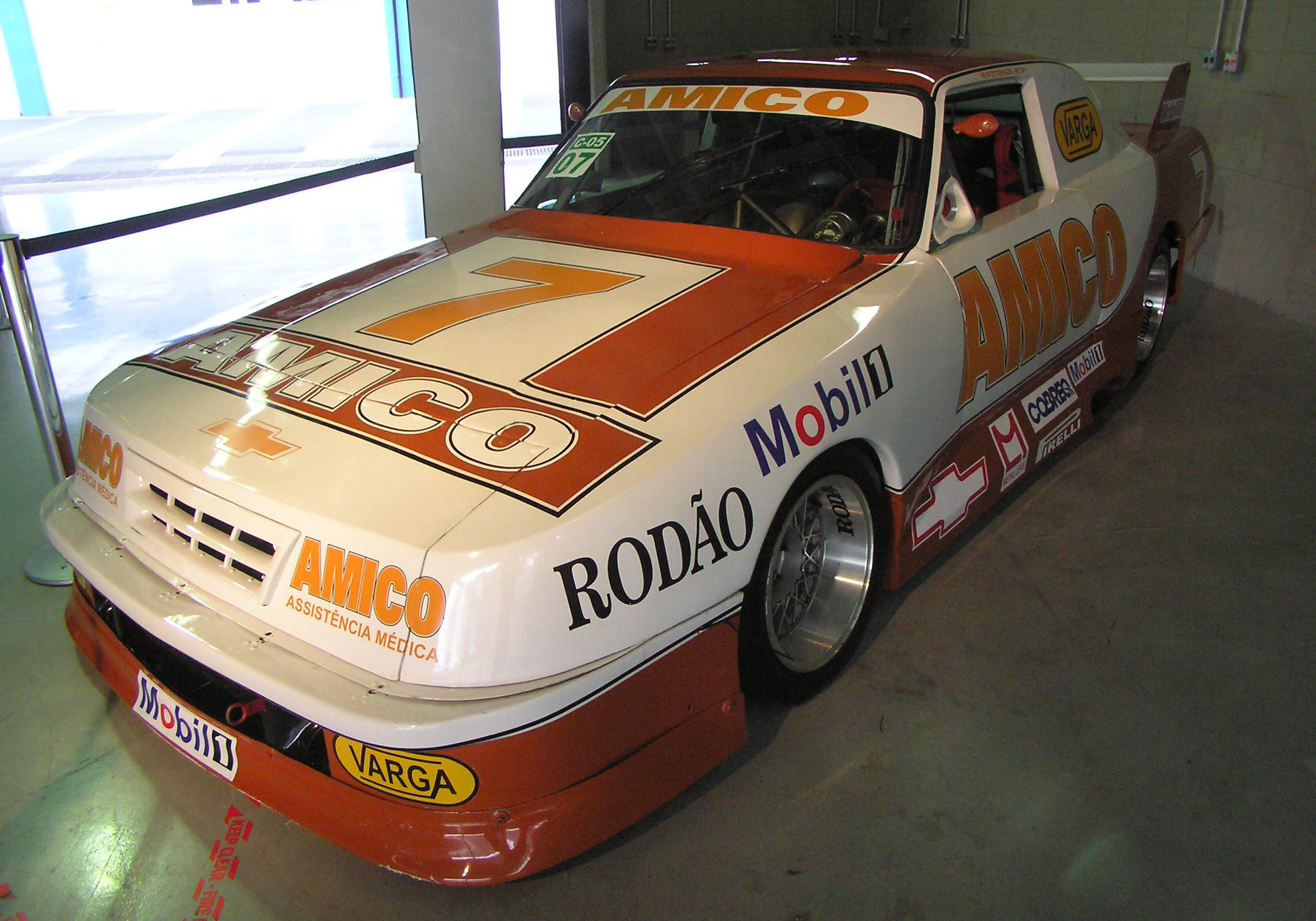
Chevrolet Opala 1990–1993

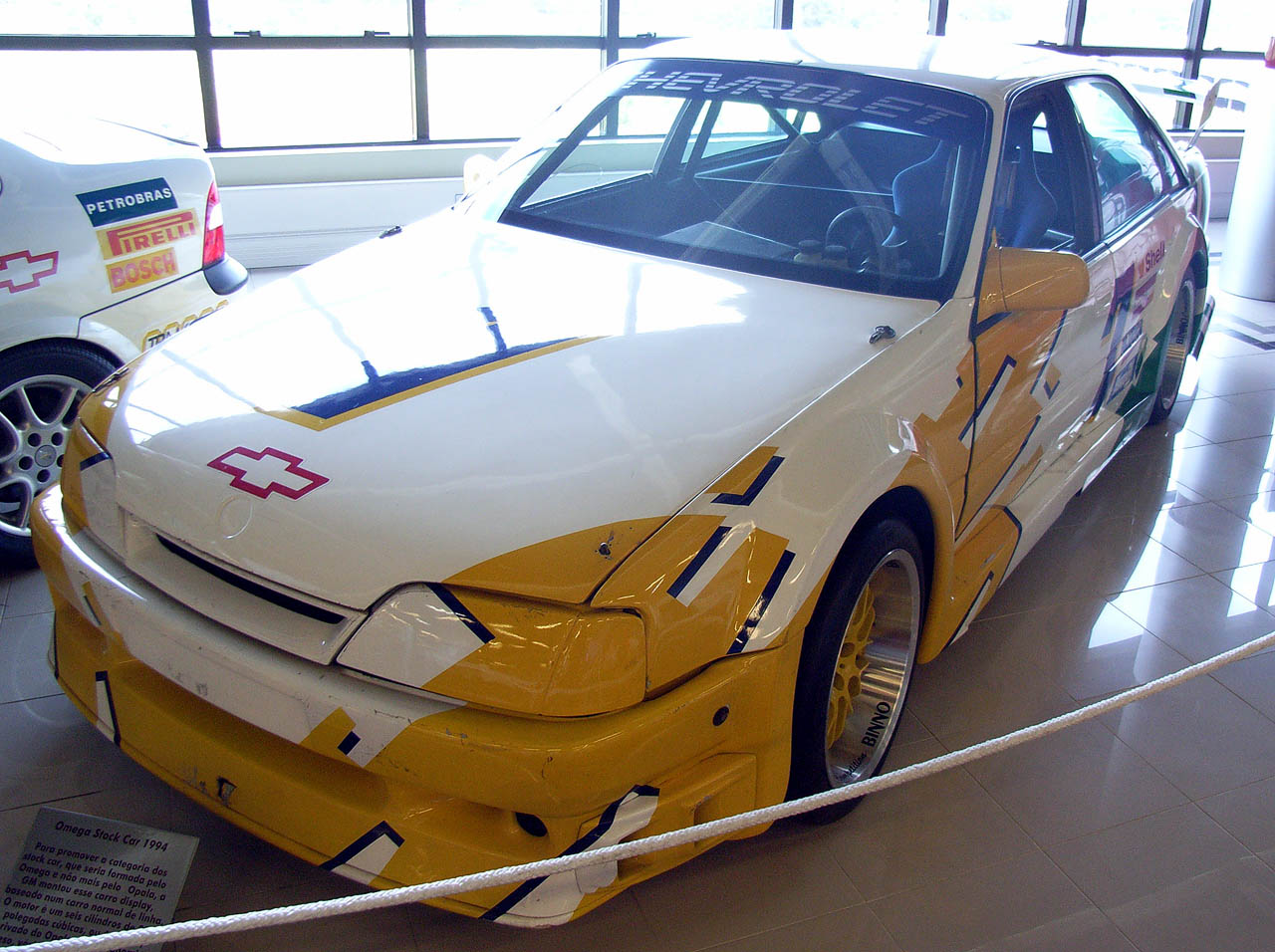
Chevrolet Omega 1994–1999

In 1990 General Motors renewed its interest in the category and built a prototype intended to replace the Caio/Hidroplas model.

In 1991 new rules were established and the races were disputed in double rounds on the weekends, with two drivers per car, but the series continued to lose ground with the public, sponsors and television networks to other championships with many manufacturers involved, such as Campeonato Brasileiro de Marcas e Pilotos that included the involvement of Chevrolet, Fiat, Ford and Volkswagen, as well as the always popular Formula racing championships.

In 1994 the championship returned to the old rules and Chevrolet announced that the Chevrolet Omega would be introduced as the new standard model. As part of a marketing strategy and in order to reduce costs, the tickets were free and the races were now held in double rounds sponsored by Brazilian Formula Chevrolet in an event called Chevrolet Challenger. This decade marked a dominant era for Ingo Hoffmann with eight titles, three in partnership with Ângelo Giombell. His only serious challenges came from Paulo Gomes in 1995 and Chico Serra in 1999.

=== 2000s ===
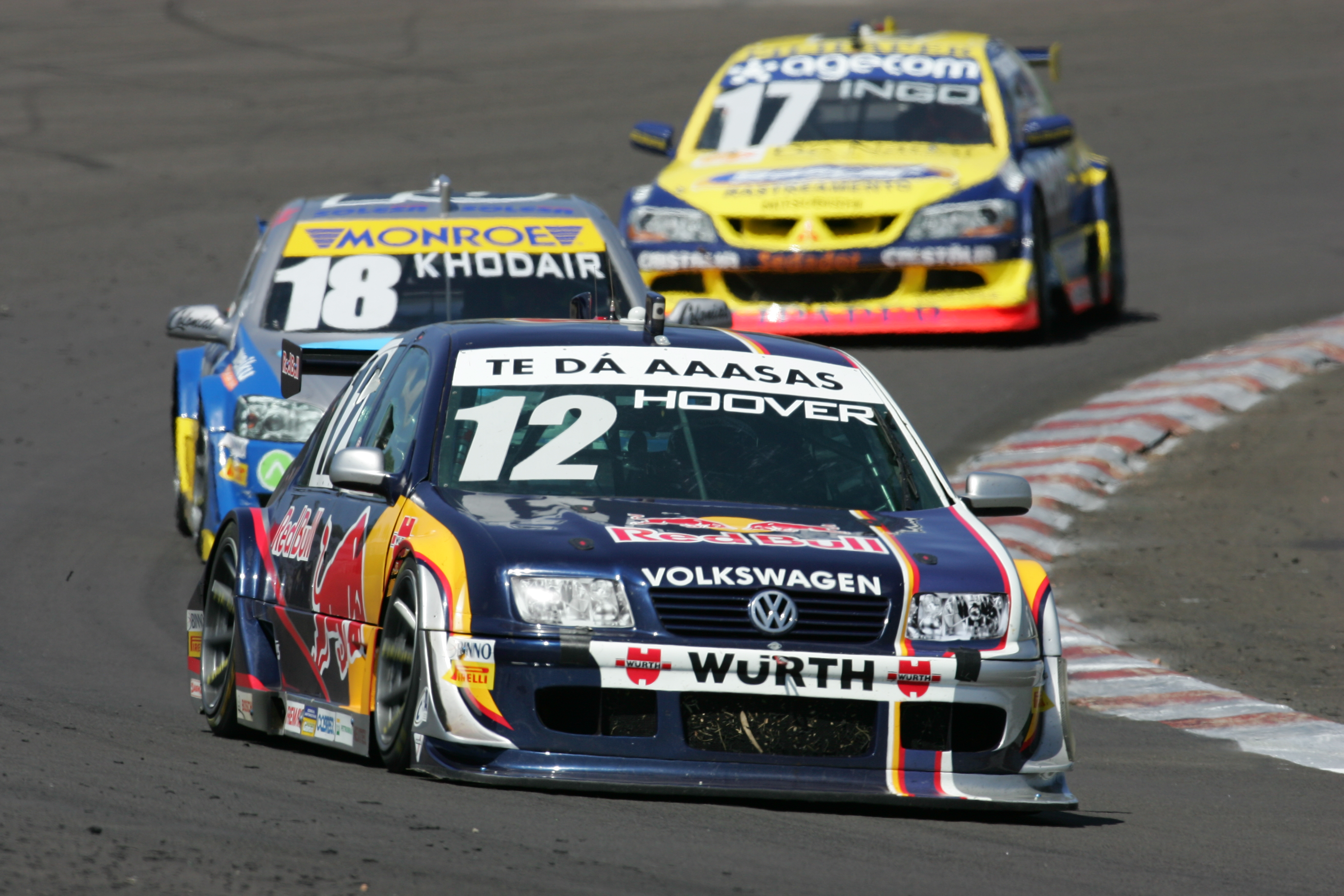
Stock Car in 2007; Chassis used in 2000 until 2008

From 2000 on, General Motors departed the series' management and Vicar Promoções Desportivas, owned by former racing driver Carlos Col, took over the organization. This ushered in a period of modernization and improved security as the category started to use a tubular chassis designated JL G-09. The project engineer was Edgardo Fernandez, who did something similar for the Argentina category Top Race V6, inspired by both NASCAR and the DTM. The chassis was built by Zeca Giaffone's JL Racing.

In 2003 the category replaced the Chevrolet 6-cylinder engine used with modifications since 1979 with a Chevrolet V8 imported from the United States by JL Racing, similar to the engines used by the NASCAR Busch Series. Despite not managing the series anymore, General Motors still participated in the series with the Vectra.

In 2005 Mitsubishi entered the series with the Mitsubishi Lancer Evolution, marking the first time in the series' history in which Chevrolet was not the sole manufacturer competing. 30 October of that same year marked the first race held in Argentina at Autódromo Juan y Oscar Gálvez, alongside the TC 2000 category. Attendance was 70,000. Giuliano Losacco was the winner, with Mateus Greipel second and Luciano Burti coming in third.

In 2006, Volkswagen entered in the series with the Bora and the championship adopted a point system similar to the one used in NASCAR, as well as a new system with 16 teams and 32 drivers. At the end of the season, the 10 best drivers were automatically qualified to run the 4 final races, called Super Final, similar to the Chase for the Sprint Cup.

The 2007 season marked the largest amount of manufacturers competing in the category, with the entrance of Peugeot and the 307 Sedan. The season had the presence of Chevrolet, Mitsubishi, Peugeot, and Volkswagen. Volkswagen announced it was withdrawing from the category in 2008, with two-time champion Mitsubishi doing the same one year later in 2009. In 2008, the championship changed from Pirelli tires to Goodyear.

=== 2010s ===
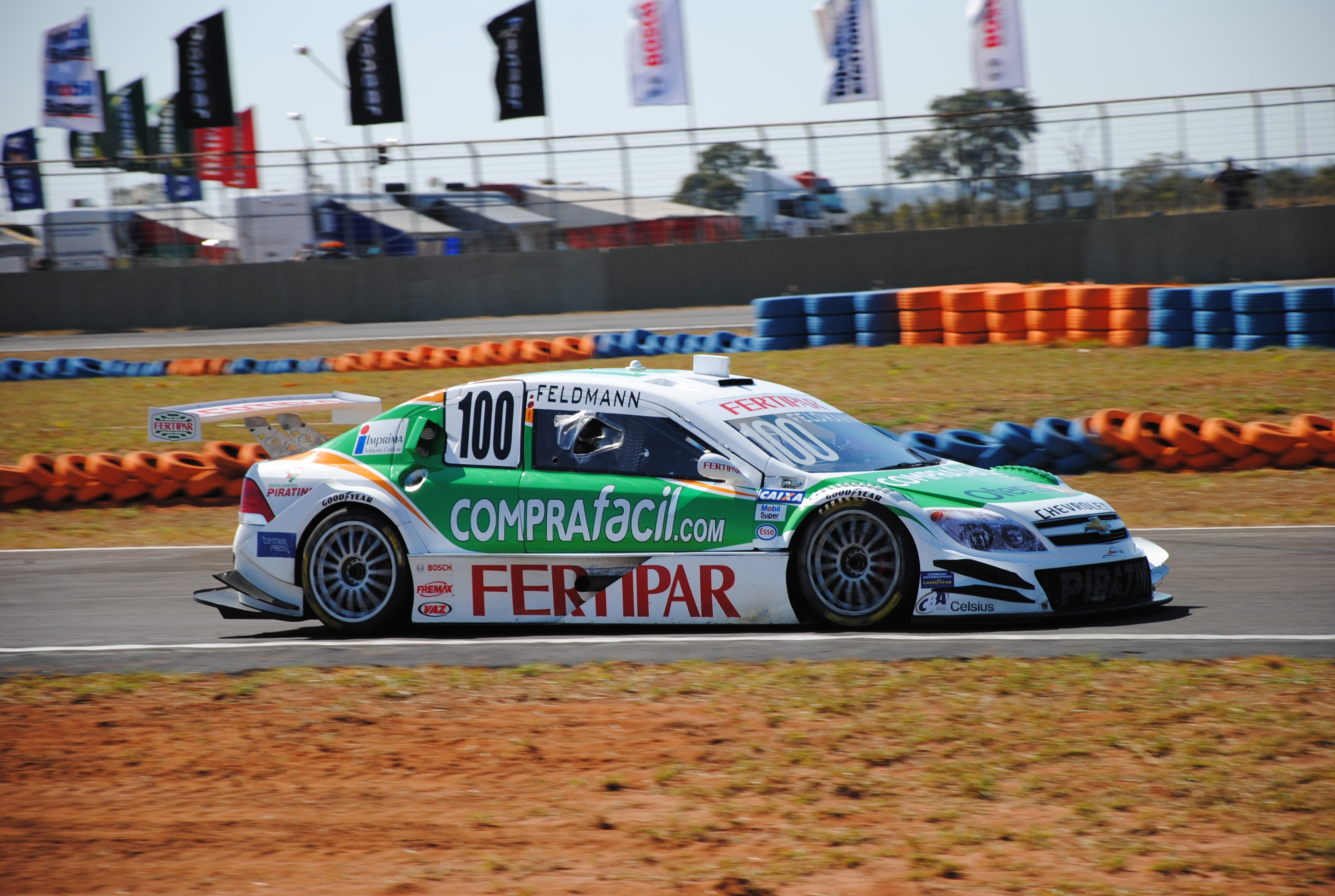
Alceu Feldmann on Campo Grande Speedway with the Chevrolet Vectra, in 2011

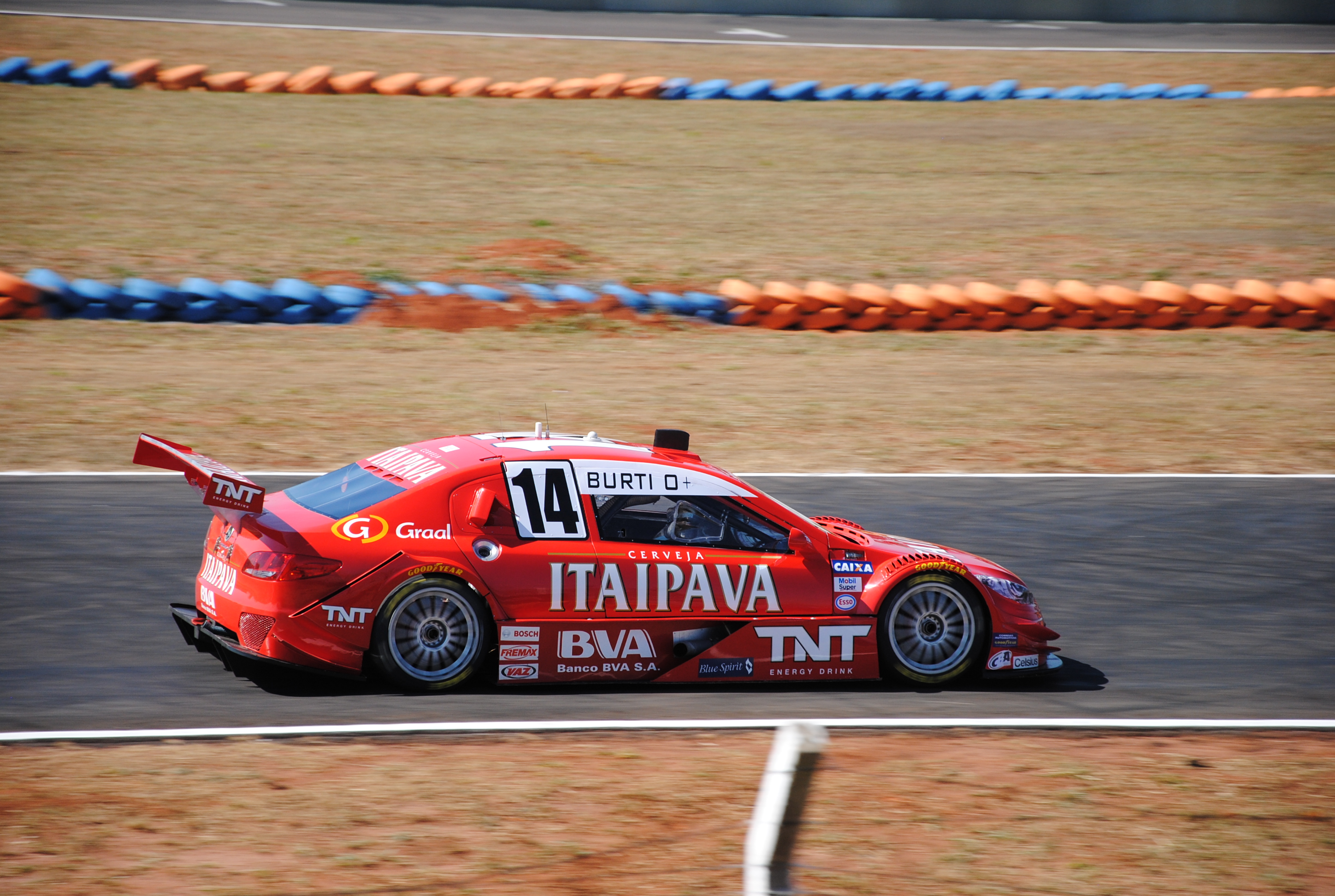
Luciano Burti on Campo Grande Speedway with the Peugeot 408, in 2011

In 2010 the category started using ethanol as fuel and engines with electronic injection, and Caixa signed a title sponsorship deal that lasted until 2012.

In 2011, Peugeot re-entered the championship announced with the 408 sedan model, replacing the 307. In 2012, Chevrolet introduced the Chevrolet Sonic as its competing model, replacing the Vectra. 2012 was also the last season in which Goodyear supplied tires, with Pirelli returning as the sole tire supplier in the championship from 2013 onward. The category announced changes in the championship for the 2012 season, dropping the Super Final system. The scoring system was also changed, with the top twenty drivers in each race being awarded points.

For the 2016 season, General Motors announced the Chevrolet Cruze as the replacement for the Sonic. In 2017, Peugeot announced its withdrawal from the championship, leaving Chevrolet as the sole automaker to compete in the series, making it a one-make championship, with all drivers using Cruze models.

=== 2020s ===
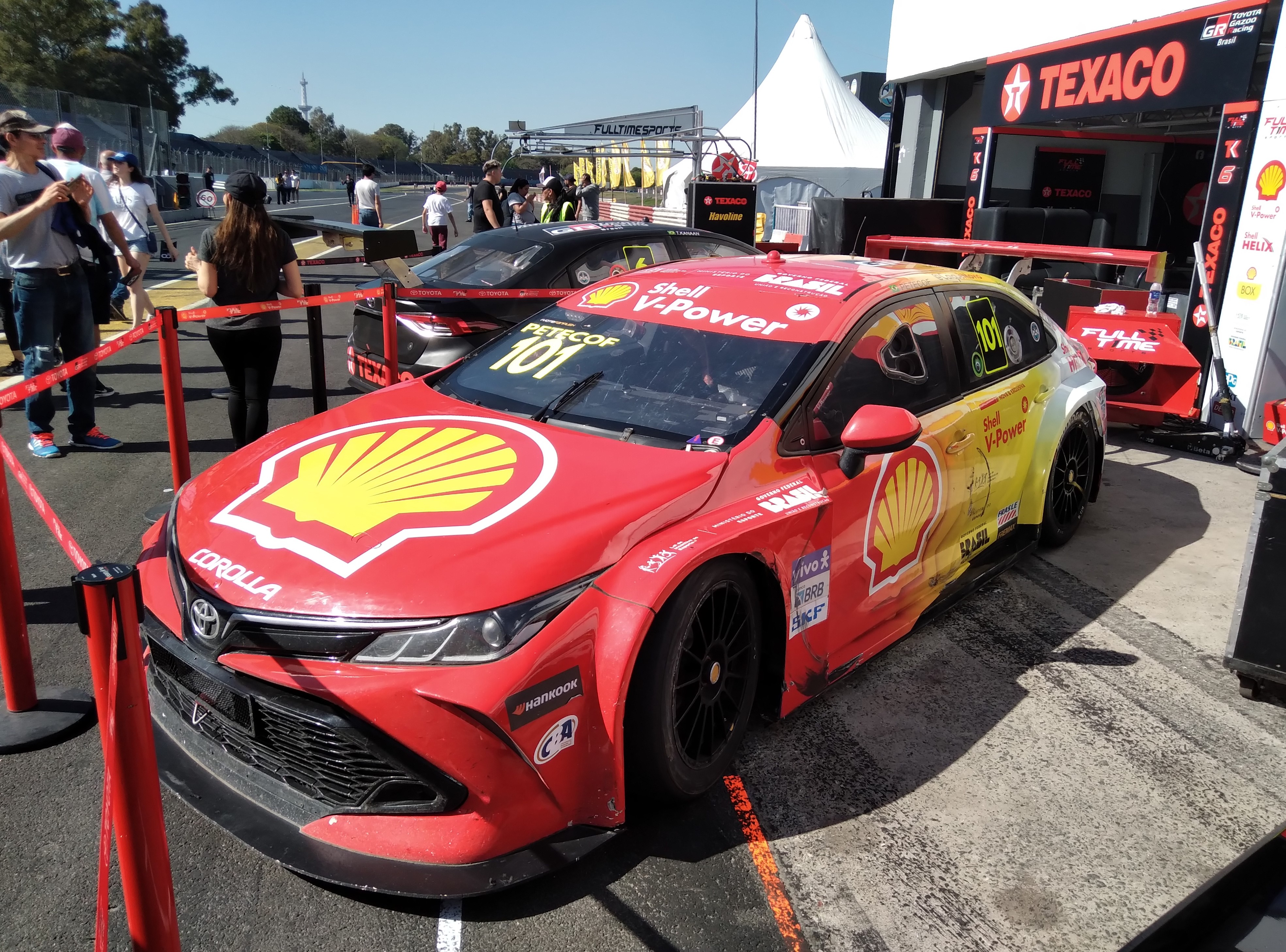
Toyota Corolla of Gianluca Petecof in 2023

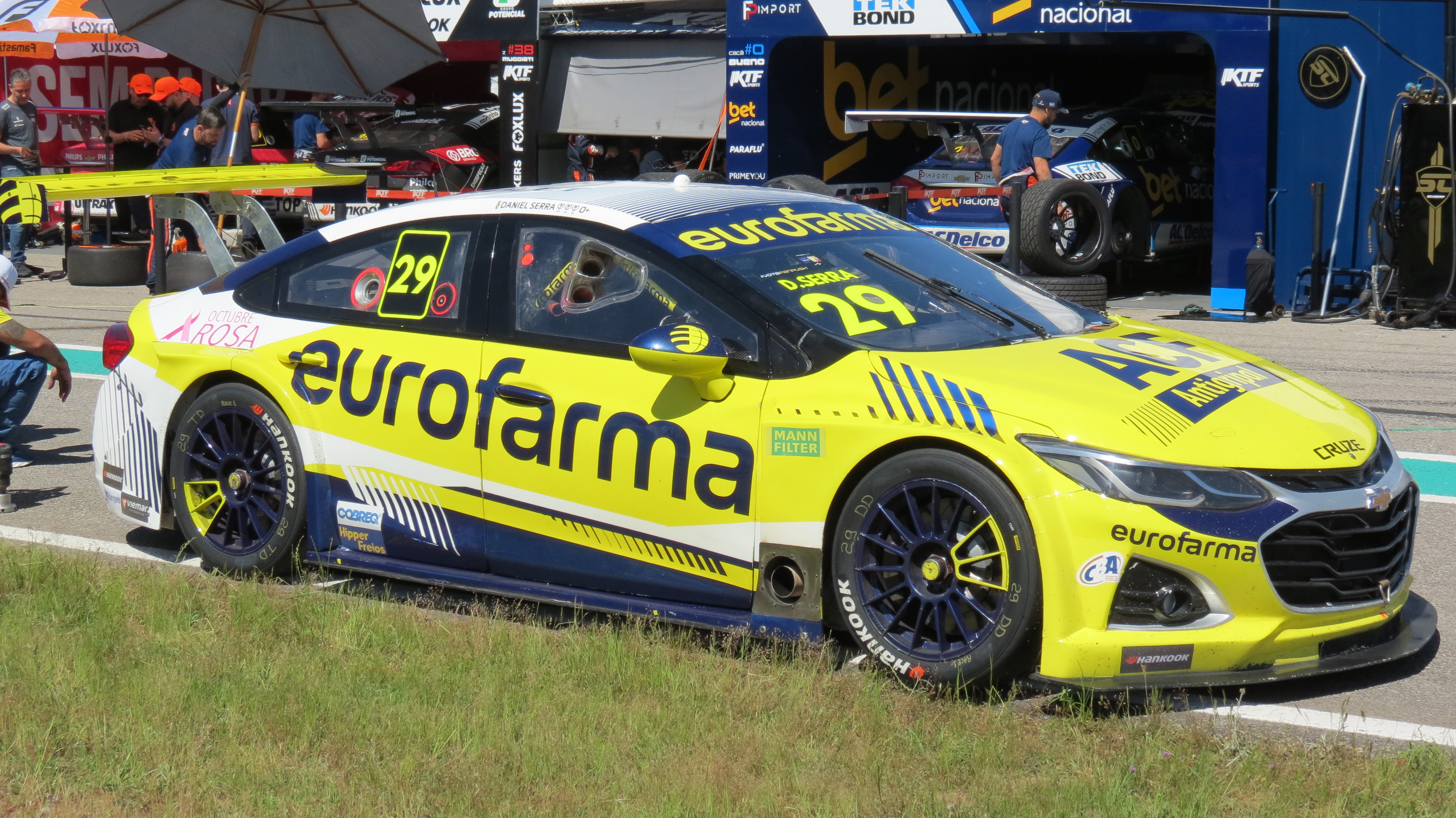
Chevrolet Cruze of Daniel Serra in 2024

In 2020, Toyota Gazoo Racing entered alongside Chevrolet, fielding a regulation version of their Toyota Corolla, which received a facelift in 2021. The season also saw a return to a monocoque chassis, replacing the tubular chassis used since 2000. On 12 December 2022, Vicar and Pirelli announced that they would not be renewing their contract and that from 2023 onward, Stock Car, Stock Series, and the F4 Brazil Championship will be supplied exclusively by Hankook.

In 2025, the series switched to a Crossover SUV-based formula. A decision based on Brazilian passenger vehicle sales, the Chevrolet Tracker and Toyota Corolla Cross replaced the existing cars whilst Mitsubishi returned to the category with the Eclipse Cross. The changes continued with a single season run with turbocharged Inline 4 engines replacing the V8 engines from earlier years. After many criticisms regarding reliability and safety, the cars reverted back to the previous engines from 2026 onwards.

== Special races ==
In 1982, the Stock Car held two non-points races at Autodromo do Estoril in Portugal.

The Corrida do Milhão (Million Race) was a special race with a prize pool of R$1 million, held in 2008 and from 2010 to 2020.

The Corrida de Duplas (Dual Race) was a two-driver race held from 2014 to 2016, and later in 2018 and 2022. Guest drivers included Jacques Villeneuve, Vitantonio Liuzzi, Jaime Alguersuari, Mark Winterbottom, Oliver Jarvis, António Félix da Costa, Álvaro Parente, Filipe Albuquerque, Jeroen Bleekemolen, Maxime Martin, Laurens Vanthoor and Néstor Girolami.

The series has raced at street circuits in Salvador, Ribeirão Preto and currently Belo Horizonte, as was as the Rio de Janeiro/Galeão International Airport. It has also raced multiple times at the Autódromo Juan y Oscar Gálvez in Argentina, and once at the Autódromo Víctor Borrat Fabini in Uruguay.

== Support series ==
Created in 1992, the Brazilian Formula Chevrolet was the Series' main support category. It used the same chassis as Formula Opel until 1994, subsequently switching to a Techspeed chassis until 2002, which was the same year the category was retired.

The Stock Car Light second tier was created in 1993, and reformulated in 2008 to become the Copa Vicar. After a merger with Pick-up Racing Brasil, the Copa Chevrolet Montana was established and standardized around the Chevrolet Montana model. Pick-up Racing Brasil was a category created in 2001 but only became part of the Stock Car Brasil programme until 2006.

The Stock Car Jr. third tier was created in 2006. It was intended for young and amateur drivers moving from Kart racing. In 2010 the category was replaced with the Mini Challenge Brasil. After three seasons it was cancelled. The current support series for Stock Car is Stock Light, acting as the access junior series for the former, working with a scholarship system in which the champion of Stock Light is given a guaranteed seat for a single season of Stock Car Pro.

== Manufacturer representation ==
Make	79	80	81	82	83	84	85	86	87	88	89	90	91	92	93	94	95	96	97	98	99	00	01	02	03	04	05	06	07	08	09	10	11	12	13	14	15	16	17	18	19	20	21	22	23	24	25
(United States) Chevrolet	Opala								Caio Hidroplas			Opala Prototype				Omega						Vectra				Astra					Vectra			Sonic				Cruze									Tracker
(Japan) Mitsubishi																												Lancer Evolution																			Eclipse Cross
(France) Peugeot																														307				408													
(Germany) Volkswagen																													Bora																		
(Japan) Toyota																																											Corolla				Corolla Cross

== Scoring systems ==
=== Prior 2012 ===
Pos	1	2	3	4	5	6	7	8	9	10	11	12	13	14	15
Race	25	20	16	14	12	10	9	8	7	6	5	4	3	2	1

=== 2012–2013 ===
Position	1	2	3	4	5	6	7	8	9	10	11	12	13	14	15	16	17	18	19	20
Standard	22	20	18	17	16	15	14	13	12	11	10	9	8	7	6	5	4	3	2	1
Final Round	44	40	36	34	32	30	28	26	24	22	20	18	16	14	12	10	8	6	4	2

=== 2014–2015 ===
Points were awarded for each race at an event, to the driver/s of a car that completed at least 75% of the race distance and was running at the completion of the race, up to a maximum of 48 points per event.

Points format	Position																			
Points format	1st	2nd	3rd	4th	5th	6th	7th	8th	9th	10th	11th	12th	13th	14th	15th	16th	17th	18th	19th	20th
Dual race	12	11	10	9	8	7	6	5	4	3	2	1	0							
Feature races	24	20	18	17	16	15	14	13	12	11	10	9	8	7	6	5	4	3	2	1
Sprint races	15	13	12	11	10	9	8	7	6	5	4	3	2	1	0					
Final race	48	40	36	34	32	30	28	26	24	22	20	18	16	14	12	10	8	6	4	2

- Dual Race: Used for the first round with Wildcard drivers.
- Feature races: Used for the first race of each event and the Stock Car Million race.
- Sprint races: Used for the second race of each event, with partially reversed (top ten) grid.
- Final race: Used for the last round of the season with double points.

=== 2016 ===
Points are awarded for each race at an event to the driver/s of a car that completed at least 75% of the race distance and was running at the completion of the race, up to a maximum of 60 points per event.

Points format	Position																			
Points format	1st	2nd	3rd	4th	5th	6th	7th	8th	9th	10th	11th	12th	13th	14th	15th	16th	17th	18th	19th	20th
Dual race	6	5	4	3	2	1	0													
Feature races	30	25	22	20	19	18	17	16	15	14	13	12	11	10	9	8	7	5	3	1
Sprint races	15	13	12	11	10	9	8	7	6	5	4	3	2	1	0					
Final race	60	50	44	40	38	36	34	32	30	28	26	24	22	20	18	16	14	10	6	2

- Dual Race: Used for the first round with Wildcard drivers.
- Feature races: Used for the first race of each event and the Stock Car Million race.
- Sprint races: Used for the second race of each event, with partially reversed (top ten) grid.
- Final race: Used for the last round of the season with double points.

=== 2017 ===
Points are awarded for each race at an event to the driver/s of a car that completed at least 75% of the race distance and was running at the completion of the race.

Points format	Position																			
Points format	1st	2nd	3rd	4th	5th	6th	7th	8th	9th	10th	11th	12th	13th	14th	15th	16th	17th	18th	19th	20th
Feature races	30	26	23	21	19	17	15	13	12	11	10	9	8	7	6	5	4	3	2	1
Sprint races	20	18	16	14	12	10	8	7	6	5	4	3	2	1	0					
Million race	30	25	22	20	19	18	17	16	15	14	13	12	11	10	9	8	7	5	3	1
Final race	60	52	46	42	38	34	30	26	24	22	20	18	16	14	12	10	8	6	4	2

- Feature races: Used for the first race of each event.
- Sprint races: Used for the second race of each event, with partially reversed (top ten) grid.
- Million Race: Used for One Million dollars race.
- Final race: Used for the last round of the season with double points.

=== 2018 ===
Points are awarded for each race at an event to the driver/s of a car that completed at least 75% of the race distance and was running at the completion of the race.

Points format	Position														
Points format	1st	2nd	3rd	4th	5th	6th	7th	8th	9th	10th	11th	12th	13th	14th	15th
Feature races	30	26	22	19	17	15	13	11	9	7	5	4	3	2	1
First race/Sprint races	20	17	14	12	10	8	6	5	4	3	2	1	0		
Million race	35	30	25	21	18	15	13	11	9	7	5	4	3	2	1
Final race	60	52	44	38	34	30	26	22	18	14	10	8	6	4	2

- Feature races: Used for the first race of each event.
- First race/Sprint races: Used the first round with wildcards drivers and for the second race of each event, with partially reversed (top ten) grid .
- Million Race: Used for One Million dollars race.
- Final race: Used for the last round of the season with double points.

=== 2019–2023 ===
Points are awarded for each race at an event to the driver/s of a car that completed at least 75% of the race distance and was running at the completion of the race.

Points format	Position																			
Points format	1st	2nd	3rd	4th	5th	6th	7th	8th	9th	10th	11th	12th	13th	14th	15th	16th	17th	18th	19th	20th
Feature races	30	26	22	19	17	15	14	13	12	11	10	9	8	7	6	5	4	3	2	1
Sprint races	24	20	18	17	16	15	14	13	12	11	10	9	8	7	6	5	4	3	2	1
Final race	60	52	44	38	34	30	28	26	24	22	20	18	16	14	12	10	8	6	4	2

- Feature races Used for the first race of each event.
- Sprint races:The second race of each event, with partially reversed (top ten) grid.
- Final race: Used for the last round of the season with double points.

=== Since 2024 ===
Points format	Position																														
Points format	1st	2nd	3rd	4th	5th	6th	7th	8th	9th	10th	11th	12th	13th	14th	15th	16th	17th	18th	19th	20th	21st	22nd	23rd	24th	25th	26th	27th	28th	29th	30th	Pole
Sprint Race	55	50	46	42	38	36	34	32	30	28	26	24	22	20	18	16	14	13	12	11	10	9	8	7	6	5	4	3	2	1	2
Main Race	80	74	69	64	59	55	51	47	43	40	37	34	31	28	25	22	19	17	15	13	12	11	10	9	8	7	6	5	4	3	2

== Speed records ==
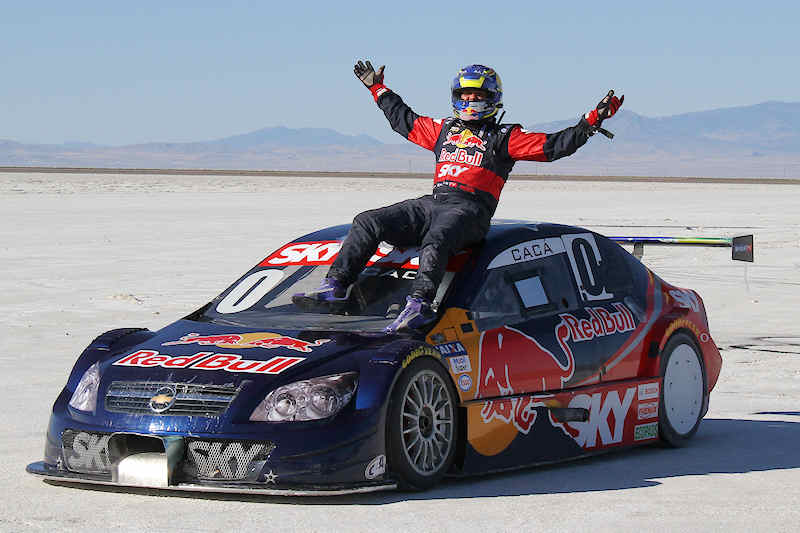
Bueno after running on the Bonneville Salt Flats

Year	Driver	Car	Local	Speed
1991	Fábio Sotto Mayor	Chevrolet Opala	Rodovia Rio-Santos	303 km/h / 188 mph
2010	Cacá Bueno	Chevrolet Vectra JL G-09	Bonneville Salt Flats	345 km/h / 214 mph

== Drivers ==
=== Notable drivers ===
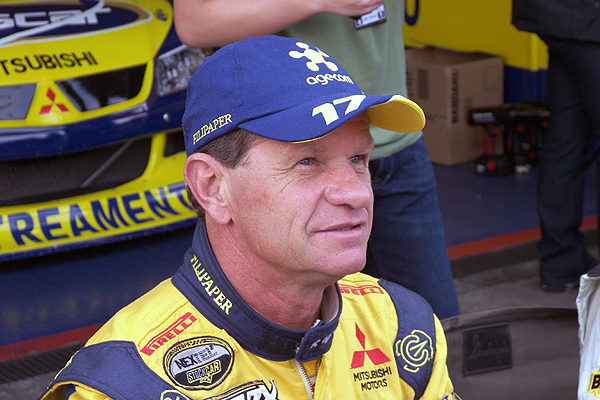
Ingo Hoffmann, 12-time champion

- Affonso Giaffone Jr. (1979–1980s) – The winner of the first race in 1979, and the champion of the 1981 season. The father of Affonso Giaffone, a former IndyCar Series driver.
- Paulo Gomes (1979–2003/2007) – The winner of the first season in 1979, also 4-time champion.
- Chico Serra (1999–2009) – 3-time champion (1999, 2000 and 2001)
- Ingo Hoffmann (1979–2008) – 12-time champion (1980, 1985, 1989, 1990, 1991, 1992, 1993, 1994, 1996, 1997, 1998 and 2002) and the driver with the most series wins overall with 77. He competed from 1979 to 2008.
- Cacá Bueno (2002–) – 5-time Champion: (2006, 2007, 2009, 2011 and 2012). Runner-up: 2003, 2004 and 2005. He is the son of the sports commentator Galvão Bueno.
- Daniel Serra (2007–) – 3-time champion (2017, 2018 and 2019), 2-time 24 Hours of Le Mans GTE Pro class winner (2017 and 2019) and son of Chico Serra.

=== Former Formula One drivers ===
Currently in the series

- Ricardo Zonta (2007–)
- Rubens Barrichello (2012–)
- Nelson Piquet Jr. (2014–2015, 2018–)
- Felipe Massa (2018, 2021–)

Formerly in the series

- Ingo Hoffmann (1979–2008)
- Raul Boesel (1979, 2003–2005)
- Chico Serra (1980s – 2007 / 2009 / 2014)
- Tarso Marques (2005–2011, 2018)
- Roberto Moreno (2005)
- Jacques Villeneuve (2011 / 2015)
- Alex Ribeiro (1980s)
- Wilson Fittipaldi (1980s – early 1990s)
- Christian Fittipaldi (2005–2007 / 2010)
- Luciano Burti (2005–2018)
- Antônio Pizzonia (2007–2018)
- Enrique Bernoldi (2007 / 2009 / 2014–2015)
- Esteban Tuero (2005)
- Luiz Bueno (1982)
- Bruno Senna (2013–2014)
- Lucas di Grassi (2014–2015, 2018–2019)
- Ricardo Rosset (2014–2015)
- Roberto Merhi (2014)
- Jaime Alguersuari (2015)
- Vitantonio Liuzzi (2015)
- Jérôme d'Ambrosio (2018)
- Pietro Fittipaldi (2021–2022)
- Gabriel Bortoleto (2022)
- Timo Glock (2022)

== Champions ==
All champions are Brazilian-registered.

Season	Driver	Car	Team	Tyres
1979	(Minas Gerais) Paulo Gomes	Chevrolet Opala	Coca-Cola Brasil/Polwax	P
1980	(São Paulo (state)) Ingo Hoffmann	Chevrolet Opala	Equipe Johnson	P
1981	(São Paulo (state)) Affonso Giaffone Jr.	Chevrolet Opala	Giaffone Motorsport	P
1982	(Goiás) Olímpio Alencar Junior	Chevrolet Opala	Spinelli Racing	P
1983	(Minas Gerais) Paulo Gomes	Chevrolet Opala	Coca-Cola Brasil/Polwax	P
1984	(Minas Gerais) Paulo Gomes	Chevrolet Opala	Team Metalpó	P
1985	(São Paulo (state)) Ingo Hoffmann	Chevrolet Opala	JF-Irmãos Giustino	P
1986	(Goiás) Marcos Gracia	Chevrolet Opala	Havoline-Texaco	P
1987	(São Paulo (state)) Zeca Giaffone	Chevrolet Opala	Giaffone Motorsport	P
1988	(São Paulo (state)) Fábio Sotto Mayor	Chevrolet Opala	Castrol Racing	P
1989	(São Paulo (state)) Ingo Hoffmann	Chevrolet Opala	JF-Teba/Cofap	P
1990	(São Paulo (state)) Ingo Hoffmann	Chevrolet Opala	Castrol Racing	P
1991	(São Paulo (state)) Ingo Hoffmann; Ângelo Giombelli	Chevrolet Opala	Castrol Racing	P
1992	(São Paulo (state)) Ingo Hoffmann; Ângelo Giombelli	Chevrolet Opala	Castrol Racing	P
1993	(São Paulo (state)) Ingo Hoffmann; Ângelo Giombelli	Chevrolet Opala	Castrol Racing	P
1994	(São Paulo (state)) Ingo Hoffmann	Chevrolet Omega	Castrol Racing	P
1995	(Minas Gerais) Paulo Gomes	Chevrolet Omega	JF-Freio Vargas	P
1996	(São Paulo (state)) Ingo Hoffmann	Chevrolet Omega	Castrol-Action Power	P
1997	(São Paulo (state)) Ingo Hoffmann	Chevrolet Omega	Castrol-Action Power	P
1998	(São Paulo (state)) Ingo Hoffmann	Chevrolet Omega	Castrol-Action Power	P
1999	(São Paulo (state)) Chico Serra	Chevrolet Omega	WB-Texaco	P
2000	(São Paulo (state)) Chico Serra	Chevrolet Vectra	WB-Texaco	P
2001	(São Paulo (state)) Chico Serra	Chevrolet Vectra	WB-Texaco	P
2002	(São Paulo (state)) Ingo Hoffmann	Chevrolet Vectra	JF-Filipaper Racing	P
2003	(Paraná (state)) David Muffato	Chevrolet Vectra	Repsol-Boettger	P
2004	(São Paulo (state)) Giuliano Losacco	Chevrolet Astra	ItuPetro RC	P
2005	(São Paulo (state)) Giuliano Losacco	Chevrolet Astra	Medley-A.Mattheis	P
2006	(Rio de Janeiro (state)) Cacá Bueno	Mitsubishi Lancer Evolution	Eurofarma RC	P
2007	(Rio de Janeiro (state)) Cacá Bueno	Mitsubishi Lancer Evolution	Eurofarma RC	P
2008	(São Paulo (state)) Ricardo Maurício	Peugeot 307	Medley-WA Mattheis	G
2009	(Rio de Janeiro (state)) Cacá Bueno	Peugeot 307	Red Bull Racing	G
2010	(São Paulo (state)) Max Wilson	Chevrolet Vectra	Eurofarma RC	G
2011	(Rio de Janeiro (state)) Cacá Bueno	Peugeot 408	Red Bull Racing	G
2012	(Rio de Janeiro (state)) Cacá Bueno	Chevrolet Sonic	Red Bull Racing	G
2013	(São Paulo (state)) Ricardo Maurício	Chevrolet Sonic	Eurofarma RC	P
2014	(São Paulo (state)) Rubens Barrichello	Chevrolet Sonic	Full Time Sports	P
2015	(São Paulo (state)) Marcos Gomes	Peugeot 408	Voxx Racing	P
2016	(Pará) Felipe Fraga	Peugeot 408	Voxx Racing	P
2017	(São Paulo (state)) Daniel Serra	Chevrolet Cruze	Eurofarma RC	P
2018	(São Paulo (state)) Daniel Serra	Chevrolet Cruze	Eurofarma RC	P
2019	(São Paulo (state)) Daniel Serra	Chevrolet Cruze	Eurofarma RC	P
2020	(São Paulo (state)) Ricardo Maurício	Chevrolet Cruze	Eurofarma RC	P
2021	(Paraná (state)) Gabriel Casagrande	Chevrolet Cruze	AMattheis Vogel	P
2022	(São Paulo (state)) Rubens Barrichello	Toyota Corolla	Full Time Sports	P
2023	(Paraná (state)) Gabriel Casagrande	Chevrolet Cruze	AMattheis Vogel	H
2024	(Paraná (state)) Gabriel Casagrande	Chevrolet Cruze	AMattheis Vogel	H
2025	(Pará) Felipe Fraga	Mitsubishi Eclipse Cross	Eurofarma RC	H

== Circuits ==
Stock Car tracks in 2026

Stock Car races are held mostly on road courses, although a race was held on a street circuit in Salvador for the first time in 2009. Along its history, the championship has exclusively run in Brazilian tracks, with the only other South American countries to hold a race being Uruguay and Argentina. The tracks for the 2026 season are:

- (Minas Gerais) Circuito dos Cristais, Curvelo, MG (2016–2017, 2025–present)
- (Paraná (state)) Autódromo Internacional de Cascavel, Cascavel, PR (1979–1981, 1983–1993, 1995–1997, 2000, 2012–2021, 2023–present)
- (São Paulo (state)) Autódromo José Carlos Pace (Interlagos), São Paulo, SP (1979–present) (Note: The last race in the full course of Interlagos was held in 1989.)
- (Goiás) Autódromo Internacional Ayrton Senna (Goiânia), Goiânia, GO (1979–1981, 1983–2001, 2004, 2014–2024, 2026)
- Autódromo Internacional de Mato Grosso, Cuiabá, MT (2025–present)
- (São Paulo (state)) Autódromo Velo Città, Mogi Guaçu, SP (2017–present)
- (Santa Catarina (state)) Autódromo Internacional de Chapecó, Chapecó, SC (2026)
- (Federal District (Brazil)) Autódromo Internacional de Brasília, Brasília, DF (1979–1981, 1983–1986, 1988–1992, 1994–2014, 2025–present)
- (Rio Grande do Sul) Velopark, Nova Santa Rita, RS (2010–2019, 2022–present)

Former circuits include:

- (Paraná (state)) Autódromo Internacional Ayrton Senna (Londrina), Londrina, PR (1993–1995, 1997, 1999–2008, 2010–2012, 2016–2020)
- (Paraná (state)) Autódromo Internacional de Curitiba, Pinhais, PR (1980–2018, 2020–2021)
- (Rio Grande do Sul) Autódromo Internacional de Guaporé, Guaporé, RS (1979–1981, 1983–1995, 2000, 2002)
- (Rio Grande do Sul) Autódromo Internacional de Santa Cruz do Sul, Santa Cruz do Sul, RS (2005–2011, 2014–2019, 2021–2022)
- (Rio Grande do Sul) Autódromo Internacional de Tarumã, Viamão, RS (1979–1981, 1983–1996, 1998–2001, 2004–2009, 2012–2017, 2023)
- (Rio de Janeiro (state)) Autódromo Internacional Nelson Piquet (Jacarepaguá), Rio de Janeiro, RJ (1979–2012) (Note: The last race in the full course of Jacarepaguá was held in 2005.)
- (Mato Grosso do Sul) Autódromo Internacional Orlando Moura, Campo Grande, MS (2002–2004, 2006–2011, 2015, 2018–2019, 2025)
- (Ceará) Autódromo Internacional Virgílio Távora, Fortaleza, CE (1979, 1984, 1989, 1992)
- (Argentina) Autódromo Juan y Oscar Gálvez, Buenos Aires (2005–2007, 2017, 2023–2024)
- (Uruguay) Autódromo Víctor Borrat Fabini, El Pinar (2024)
- (Bahia) Circuito Ayrton Senna, Salvador, BA (2009–2014)
- (Rio de Janeiro (state)) Circuito Cacá Bueno, Rio de Janeiro, RJ (2022)
- (Portugal) Circuito do Estoril, Estoril (1982)
- (Minas Gerais) Circuito Toninho da Matta, Belo Horizonte, MG (2024)
- (São Paulo (state)) Ribeirão Preto Street Circuit, Ribeirão Preto, SP (2010–2013, 2015)

== Fatal accidents ==
There have been five fatal accidents:

- In 1985, Zeca Greguricinski, died at Interlagos from burns suffered after a crash.
- In June 2001, Laércio Justino, died at Nelson Piquet Circuit of Brasília after losing control of the car and crashing at the pit lane entrance.
- In September 2003, Raphael Lima Pereira, a 19-year-old photographer, was hit by Gualter Salles at Campo Grande circuit and died. He was near the safety area at the time of the accident.
- On 9 December 2007, Rafael Sperafico, of the Sperafico racing family, died during the final race of the Stock Car Light 2007 season at Interlagos. His cousins Rodrigo and Ricardo Sperafico compete in the top-level series. It was the first fatal accident in the Stock Car Light series.
- On 3 April 2011, Gustavo Sondermann, competing in a Copa Chevrolet Montana race, was killed at Interlagos in an accident almost identical to that of Sperafico four years earlier.

== Video games ==
The first official video game was Game Stock Car in 2011, with a followup title Stock Car Extreme launched in 2013. Both were developed by Reiza Studios.

In 2014, Both the Peugeot 408 and a non-licensed version of the Chevrolet Sonic called "ADC Presteza" were present in the Category A Touring Cars class of Grid Autosport.

Automobilista, released in 2016 and developed by Reiza Studios using the rFactor engine, featured the full 2015 and 2017 car grids and circuits. Automobilista 2, released in 2020 using the Project CARS engine, adding the 2019 and 2020 cars and circuits.

Racing simulator iRacing has included the Stock Car Pro Series cars in the game since 2022.

== See also ==
- Copa Truck
- Deutsche Tourenwagen Masters
- NASCAR
  - NASCAR Brasil Sprint Race
- TC 2000 Championship
- World Touring Car Cup
- Brazilian Automobile Confederation
- Stock Series
