= Spreafico =

Spreafico is an Italian surname from Lombardy, meaning "fig-peeler" (i.e. a needy person). Notable people with the name include:

- Eugenio Spreafico (1856–1919), Italian painter
- Matteo Spreafico (born 1993), Italian cyclist

== See also ==
- Sperafico family
