= Sperafico family =

Sperafico is the surname of a family of Brazilian racing drivers from Toledo, Paraná. Ten members of the family have competed in racing series, with the four most notable members listed below. Two are brothers and two are their cousins.

The two brothers:

- Ricardo Sperafico (born July 23, 1979) — at least one season in the Champ Car World Series. Also raced in Formula 3000, finishing as series runner-up in 2003.
- Rodrigo Sperafico (born July 23, 1979) — raced in F3000 and F3 series. Also raced in the Brazilian stock car series.

The two cousins:

- Alexandre Sperafico (born January 21, 1974) — competed in the Champ Car Atlantic Championship. He is the oldest of the four racing Speraficos.
- Rafael Sperafico (April 22, 1981 – December 9, 2007) — killed while racing at Interlagos in São Paulo in a junior league race to the Stock Car Brasil series (Stock Car Light) when his car was t-boned by another driver.

The four family members often competed against each other in Brazilian F3 racing during the late 1990s among other series. Rodrigo and Ricardo also competed against each other for competing teams during the 2000 Italian Formula 3000 season. The two were joined by Alexandre in the 2002 International Formula 3000 season.

== See also ==
- Spreafico
