= 2004 World Series by Nissan =

Seasons
- ← 2003 2005 (Renault) →

The 2004 World Series by Nissan was contested over 9 race weekends/18 rounds. In this one-make formula all drivers had to utilize Dallara chassis (Dallara SN01) and Nissan engines (Nissan VQ). 11 different teams and 31 different drivers competed. Heikki Kovalainen claimed the title for Pons Racing, clinching it at the first race at Circuit Ricardo Tormo.

== 2004 Driver Lineup ==
Team	No.	Driver	Rounds
(Spain) Gabord Reyco	1	(Republic of Ireland) Ralph Firman	1-2
(Spain) Gabord Reyco	1	(Japan) Takaya Tsubobayashi	5-7
(Spain) Gabord Reyco	1	(Japan) Hiroki Yoshimoto	8-9
(Spain) Gabord Reyco	2	(Argentina) Juan Cruz Álvarez	All
(Spain) Epsilon Euskadi	3	(Spain) Ander Vilariño	1-4
(Spain) Epsilon Euskadi	3	(France) Julien Vidot	5-6
(Spain) Epsilon Euskadi	3	(Spain) Félix Porteiro	7-9
(Spain) Epsilon Euskadi	4	(France) Jean-Christophe Ravier	All
(United Kingdom) Carlin Motorsport	5	(Portugal) Tiago Monteiro	All
(United Kingdom) Carlin Motorsport	6	(Republic of Ireland) Michael Keohane	2
(United Kingdom) Carlin Motorsport	6	(France) Olivier Pla	3-9
(Italy) GD Racing	7	(Brazil) Enrique Bernoldi	All
(Italy) GD Racing	8	(Chile) Pablo Donoso	1-7
(Italy) GD Racing	8	(Italy) Giacomo Ricci	8
(Italy) GD Racing	8	(France) Damien Pasini	9
(France) Saulnier Racing	9	(Spain) Sergio Hernández	5-9
(France) Saulnier Racing	10	(France) Tristan Gommendy	All
(Italy) Tata RC Motorsport	11	(India) Narain Karthikeyan	All
(Italy) Tata RC Motorsport	12	(France) Olivier Pla	1-2
(Italy) Tata RC Motorsport	12	(Czech Republic) Tomáš Kostka	3-7
(Italy) Tata RC Motorsport	12	(India) Karun Chandhok	8-9
(Italy) Vergani Formula	14	(Italy) Giacomo Ricci	5-7
(Italy) Vergani Formula	14	(Serbia and Montenegro) Miloš Pavlović	8-9
(Italy) Vergani Formula	15	(Brazil) Rodrigo Sperafico	1-2
(Italy) Vergani Formula	15	(Italy) Giovanni Tedeschi	5-9
(Belgium) Witmeur KTR	16	(France) Didier André	1-8
(Belgium) Witmeur KTR	17	(France) Bruce Jouanny	1-3
(France) Paul Belmondo Racing	18	(France) Boris Derichebourg	1
(France) Paul Belmondo Racing	19	(Japan) Ryo Fukuda	1-2
(Spain) Porfesa Competicion	20	(Spain) Félix Porteiro	1-6
(Spain) Porfesa Competicion	21	(Spain) Roldán Rodríguez	1-5
(Spain) Porfesa Competicion	21	(Spain) Santiago Porteiro	8
(Spain) Pons Racing	22	(Finland) Heikki Kovalainen	All
(Spain) Pons Racing	23	(Spain) Adrián Vallés	All

== Race calendar and results ==
Round		Circuit	Date	Pole position	Fastest lap	Winning driver	Winning team	Report
1	R1	(Spain) Circuito del Jarama	28 March	(Brazil) Enrique Bernoldi	(Brazil) Enrique Bernoldi	(Brazil) Enrique Bernoldi	(Italy) GD Racing	Report
1	R2	(Spain) Circuito del Jarama	28 March	(Brazil) Enrique Bernoldi	(France) Bruce Jouanny	(Brazil) Enrique Bernoldi	(Italy) GD Racing	Report
2	R1	(Belgium) Circuit Zolder	25 April	(Portugal) Tiago Monteiro	(Portugal) Tiago Monteiro	(Portugal) Tiago Monteiro	(United Kingdom) Carlin Motorsport	Report
2	R2	(Belgium) Circuit Zolder	25 April	(Finland) Heikki Kovalainen	(Portugal) Tiago Monteiro	(Portugal) Tiago Monteiro	(United Kingdom) Carlin Motorsport	Report
3	R1	(France) Circuit de Nevers Magny-Cours	23 May	(Finland) Heikki Kovalainen	(Finland) Heikki Kovalainen	(India) Narain Karthikeyan	(Italy) Tata RC Motorsport	Report
3	R2	(France) Circuit de Nevers Magny-Cours	23 May	(Finland) Heikki Kovalainen	(Finland) Heikki Kovalainen	(Finland) Heikki Kovalainen	(Spain) Pons Racing	Report
4	R1	(Spain) Circuit Ricardo Tormo	20 June	(Finland) Heikki Kovalainen	(France) Jean-Christophe Ravier	(France) Jean-Christophe Ravier	(Spain) Epsilon Euskadi	Report
4	R2	(Spain) Circuit Ricardo Tormo	20 June	(Finland) Heikki Kovalainen	(Finland) Heikki Kovalainen	(Finland) Heikki Kovalainen	(Spain) Pons Racing	Report
5	R1	(Germany) Lausitzring	8 August	(Finland) Heikki Kovalainen	(Finland) Heikki Kovalainen	(Finland) Heikki Kovalainen	(Spain) Pons Racing	Report
5	R2	(Germany) Lausitzring	8 August	(Finland) Heikki Kovalainen	(Finland) Heikki Kovalainen	(Finland) Heikki Kovalainen	(Spain) Pons Racing	Report
6	R1	(Portugal) Autódromo do Estoril	19 September	(Portugal) Tiago Monteiro	(Finland) Heikki Kovalainen	(France) Olivier Pla	(United Kingdom) Carlin Motorsport	Report
6	R2	(Portugal) Autódromo do Estoril	19 September	(Portugal) Tiago Monteiro	(Finland) Heikki Kovalainen	(Portugal) Tiago Monteiro	(United Kingdom) Carlin Motorsport	Report
7	R1	(Spain) Circuit de Catalunya	3 October	(Spain) Félix Porteiro	(Spain) Adrián Vallés	(Spain) Félix Porteiro	(Spain) Epsilon Euskadi	Report
7	R2	(Spain) Circuit de Catalunya	3 October	(Finland) Heikki Kovalainen	(Finland) Heikki Kovalainen	(Finland) Heikki Kovalainen	(Spain) Pons Racing	Report
8	R1	(Spain) Circuit Ricardo Tormo	17 October	(India) Narain Karthikeyan	(France) Jean-Christophe Ravier	(India) Narain Karthikeyan	(Italy) Tata RC Motorsport	Report
8	R2	(Spain) Circuit Ricardo Tormo	17 October	(Portugal) Tiago Monteiro	(France) Jean-Christophe Ravier	(Portugal) Tiago Monteiro	(United Kingdom) Carlin Motorsport	Report
9	R1	(Spain) Circuito de Jerez	7 November	(Finland) Heikki Kovalainen	(Brazil) Enrique Bernoldi	(Finland) Heikki Kovalainen	(Spain) Pons Racing	Report
9	R2	(Spain) Circuito de Jerez	7 November	(Finland) Heikki Kovalainen	(Brazil) Enrique Bernoldi	(Portugal) Tiago Monteiro	(United Kingdom) Carlin Motorsport	Report

Every second race saw a mandatory pit stop.

=== Driver standings ===
For every race the points were awarded: 15 points to the winner, 12 for runner-up, 10 for third place, 8 for fourth place, 6 for fifth place, winding down to 1 point for 10th place. Lower placed drivers did not award points. Additional points were awarded to the driver setting the fastest race lap (2 points). The best 14 race results count, but all additional points count.

Pos	Driver	JAR 1 (Spain)	JAR 2 (Spain)	ZOL 1 (Belgium)	ZOL 2 (Belgium)	MAG 1 (France)	MAG 2 (France)	VAL 1 (Spain)	VAL 2 (Spain)	LAU 1 (Germany)	LAU 2 (Germany)	EST 1 (Portugal)	EST 2 (Portugal)	CAT 1 (Spain)	CAT 2 (Spain)	VAL 1 (Spain)	VAL 2 (Spain)	JER 1 (Spain)	JER 2 (Spain)	Points
1	(Finland) Heikki Kovalainen	7	4	4	2	2	1	2	1	1	1	13	3	2	1	10	5	1	14	186
2	(Portugal) Tiago Monteiro	2	6	1	1	8	5	13	7	4	5	2	1	10	7	3	1	2	1	154
3	(Brazil) Enrique Bernoldi	1	1	2	10	3	Ret	6	4	2	3	Ret	7	3	Ret	7	6	7	Ret	121
4	(France) Jean-Christophe Ravier	8	11	9	5	4	8	1	2	5	2	11	2	8	Ret	2	4	4	5	120
5	(France) Tristan Gommendy	12	5	Ret	3	5	2	7	3	3	8	4	5	4	3	9	10	6	8	101
6	(India) Narain Karthikeyan	5	Ret	3	4	1	4	11	Ret	10	6	Ret	Ret	5	4	1	2	5	11	100
7	(Argentina) Juan Cruz Álvarez	3	2	17	6	6	7	12	Ret	Ret	7	8	4	7	5	Ret	8	10	2	77
8	(Spain) Félix Porteiro	13	12	6	9	Ret	Ret	3	6	6	4	10	13	1	6	8	3	9	6	76
9	(France) Olivier Pla	9	Ret	7	7	10	10	4	5	8	17	1	9	9	Ret	4	Ret	3	15	66
10	(Spain) Adrián Vallés	15	10	15	8	7	9	14	Ret	7	11	3	10	Ret	2	6	9	Ret	3	56
11	(France) Bruce Jouanny	4	7	5	Ret	11	6													25
12	(Spain) Ander Vilariño	Ret	9	10	12	9	3	5	8											24
13	(Spain) Sergio Hernández									12	10	5	6	6	10	12	Ret	DNS	7	22
14	(France) Didier André	10	8	13	11	12	12	8	9	Ret	Ret	9	8	12	8	11	7			21
15	(Japan) Ryo Fukuda	6	3	8	Ret															18
16	(India) Karun Chandhok															Ret	13	8	4	11
17	(France) Julien Vidot									9	13	6	12							7
18	(Spain) Santiago Porteiro															5	Ret			6
19	(Chile) Pablo Donoso	Ret	Ret	14	13	13	11	10	12	Ret	9	Ret	14	11	9					5
20	(Italy) Giacomo Ricci									11	12	7	11	Ret	12	13	11			4
21	(Spain) Roldán Rodríguez	Ret	Ret	16	15	14	13	9	11	13	DNS									2
22	(Serbia and Montenegro) Miloš Pavlović															Ret	Ret	11	9	2
23	(Czech Republic) Tomáš Kostka					15	14	Ret	10	Ret	15	12	15	Ret	Ret					1
24	(Japan) Hiroki Yoshimoto															Ret	12	Ret	10	1
25	(Brazil) Rodrigo Sperafico	11	13	11	14															0
26	(Italy) Giovanni Tedeschi									15	16	Ret	Ret	13	11	14	Ret	12	13	0
27	(Republic of Ireland) Michael Keohane			12	Ret															0
28	(France) Damien Pasini																	Ret	12	0
29	(Japan) Takaya Tsubobayashi									14	14	Ret	16	14	Ret					0
30	(Republic of Ireland) Ralph Firman	14	Ret	DNS	DNS															0
NC	(France) Boris Derichebourg	Ret	DNS																	0
Pos	Driver	JAR 1 (Spain)	JAR 2 (Spain)	ZOL 1 (Belgium)	ZOL 2 (Belgium)	MAG 1 (France)	MAG 2 (France)	VAL 1 (Spain)	VAL 2 (Spain)	LAU 1 (Germany)	LAU 2 (Germany)	EST 1 (Portugal)	EST 2 (Portugal)	CAT 1 (Spain)	CAT 2 (Spain)	VAL 1 (Spain)	VAL 2 (Spain)	JER 1 (Spain)	JER 2 (Spain)	Points

Colour	Result
Gold	Winner
Silver	Second place
Bronze	Third place
Green	Points classification
Blue	Non-points classification
Blue	Non-classified finish (NC)
Purple	Retired, not classified (Ret)
Red	Did not qualify (DNQ)
Red	Did not pre-qualify (DNPQ)
Black	Disqualified (DSQ)
White	Did not start (DNS)
White	Withdrew (WD)
White	Race cancelled (C)
Blank	Did not practice (DNP)
Blank	Did not arrive (DNA)
Blank	Excluded (EX)

=== Team Standings ===
	Team	Points
1	(Spain) Pons Racing	245
2	(United Kingdom) Carlin Motorsport	218
3	(Spain) Epsilon Euskadi	193
4	(Italy) GD Racing	126
5	(France) Saulnier Racing	126
6	(Italy) RC Motorsport	122
7	(Spain) Gabord Reyco	78
8	(Belgium) Witmeur KTR	46
9	(Spain) Porfesa Competicion	44
10	(France) Paul Belmondo Racing	18
11	(Italy) Vergani Formula	6
