= JF Racing =

Brazilian motorsport team

(Brazil) JF Racing
- Founded: 1994
- Folded: 2012
- Team principal(s): Jorge Freitas

JF Racing was a Brazilian motorsport team considered one of the most successful and traditional racing teams in the Stock Car Brasil including two titles with Paulo Gomes in 1995 and Ingo Hoffmann 2002. Based in Petropolis, Rio de Janeiro, the team was founded by Paulo de Jorge Freitas. The team was sold to pharmaceutical company Cimed in 2012.
