= Action Power Racing =

Brazilian motorsport team

(Brazil) Action Power Racing
- Founded: 1994
- Folded: 2009
- Team principal(s): Paulo de Tarso Marques
- Drivers' Championships: 1996, 1997, 1998 Ingo Hoffmann; Stock Car Brasil - 2001 Thiago Marques Stock Car Light

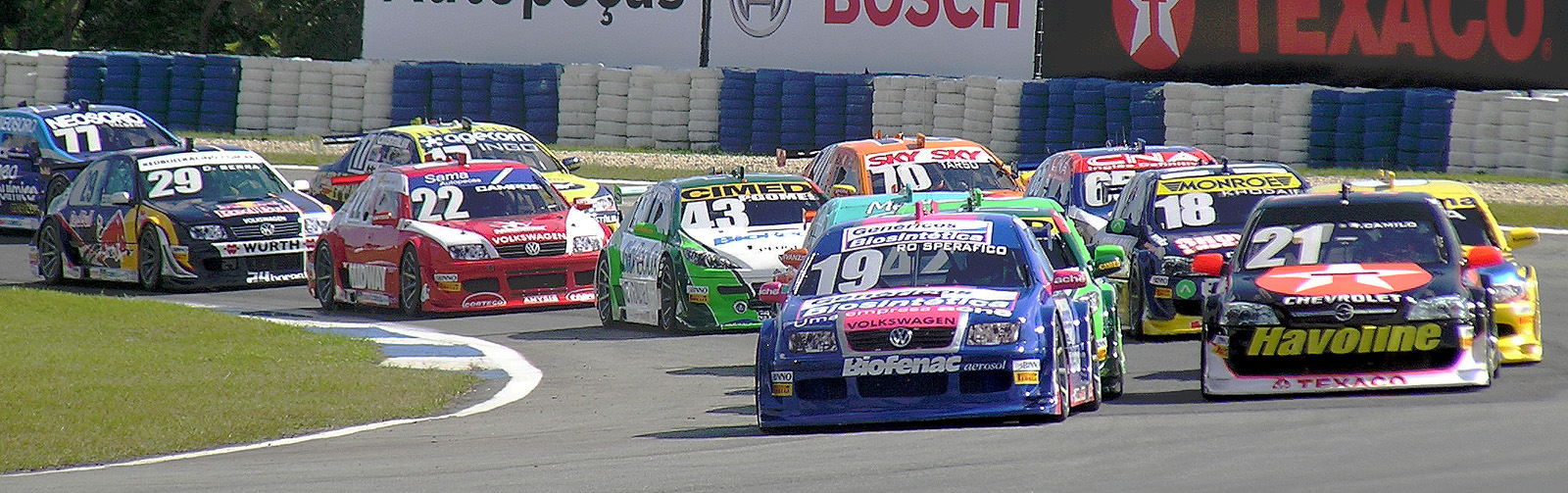
Rodrigo Sperafico on Pole at Curitiba 2007 with Action Power

Action Power Racing was a Brazilian motorsport team considered one of the most successful and traditional racing teams in the Brazilian Stock Car including three consecutive titles with Ingo Hoffmann (1996–1998). Based in Curitiba, Paraná, the team was founded by Paulo de Tarso Marques.

The team ceased its activities in the premier Stock Car Brasil series following a devastating fire that completely destroyed its transport trucks, equipment, and race cars in 2009.

Paulo de Tarso Marques was a racing driver and father of ex Formula One driver Tarso Marques and Thiago Marques. In 2012 Thiago with the support of his family decided to create the Sprint Racing. The series was later rebranded to the NASCAR Brasil Sprint Race on November 16, 2022 after the series signed an agreement with NASCAR to give the series an official NASCAR-sanctioning status starting from the 2023 season. In 2023, NASCAR intends on adding oval race tracks to the schedule. In 2025, the series was rebranded to the NASCAR Brasil Series, similar to the branding of other NASCAR Regional Series.
