= JL Racing =

JL Racing is one of Canada's premier sport sedan racing teams. In 2006, JL Racing formed a partnership with Saab Canada to race and showcase Canada's only Saab 9-3 race car. The team made headlines several times with a first-race, first-place finish and subsequent podium finishes in the Saab 9-3. The team currently competes in the Castrol Canadian Touring Car Championship.

In 2008 they will enter two Saab 9-3 MY 08 cars in the Super Touring class and will run North America's first Saab 9-3 BioPower race car in the Touring Class.

The team's current full-time drivers are John Lockhart, Jason Sharpe and Diane Dale.

== History ==
=== 2006 ===
The 2006 season was set as a test season for the team. The 2005 Saab 9-3 was built over the spring months and the team decided to focus on suspension and handling for the first part of the season. Horsepower would be addressed later in the year. As it was a development year, the team did not have high expectations. There were a number of challenges in the first few weekends of racing. The car didn’t enter any races, but rather, the practice sessions to get as much track time as possible. One of the biggest hurdles was the engine overheating and the removal of all guards and heat shields around the turbocharger eventually solved the problem.

On July 1 Canada Day weekend the team entered the car in its first race, which they subsequently won. It was the first time Saab had won first place on its first race in North America. The team went on to enter eight races for the year and came away with four overall wins. At the end of the year, the team finished in the top ten for the CASC Ontario Touring Car GT Series.

=== 2007 ===
In 2007 the team entered the Castrol Canadian Touring Car Championship. The month of September saw a win at the British Empire Motor Club (BEMC) Indian Summer War Bonnet three-hour endurance race. Another record was set as it was the first time a Saab 9-3 had won an endurance race in Canada. The final weekend of racing saw the team claim fifth position for the championship.
