= Peugeot 408 (saloon) =

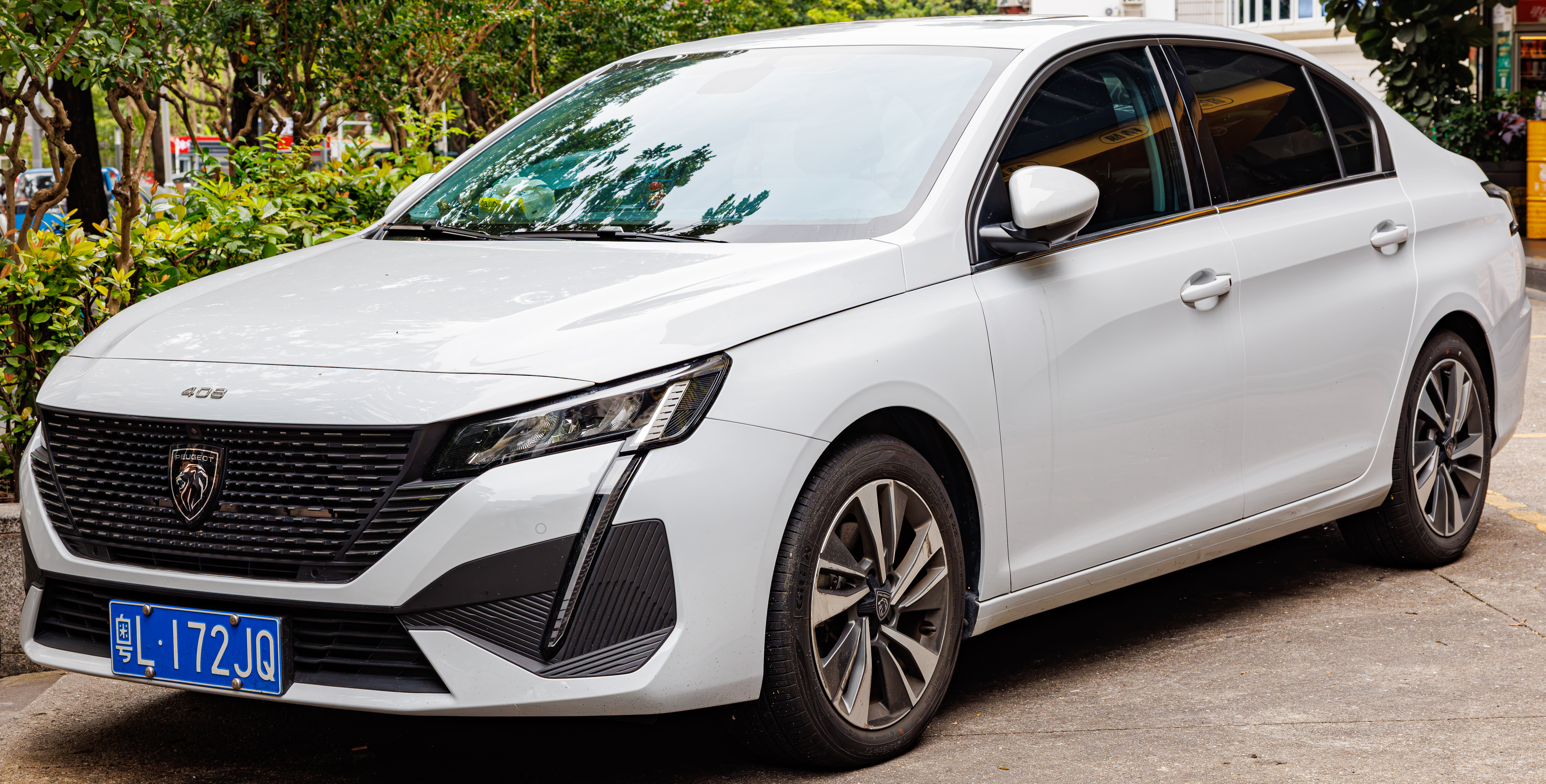
- Peugeot 408 II 2022MY

Overview
- Manufacturer: Peugeot
- Production: 2010–present

Body and chassis
- Class: Compact car (C)
- Body style: 4-door saloon
- Layout: Front-engine, front-wheel-drive
- Related: Peugeot 308

Chronology
- Predecessor: Peugeot 307 saloon

The Peugeot 408 is a compact car (European class: C-segment) produced by Peugeot since 2010. It was unveiled on January 25, 2010, at the Beijing Auto Show and sales began in China on April 8, 2010. In November 2010, production of the 408 commenced in El Palomar, Buenos Aires, Argentina, with sales starting in April 2011.

Despite its name, it is not a direct successor to the Peugeot 407, but rather a long-wheelbase saloon version of the Peugeot 308 hatchback, primarily targeted at emerging markets such as China. The 408 is not slated for the European market, and not built there.

== First generation (T7; 2010) ==
First generation
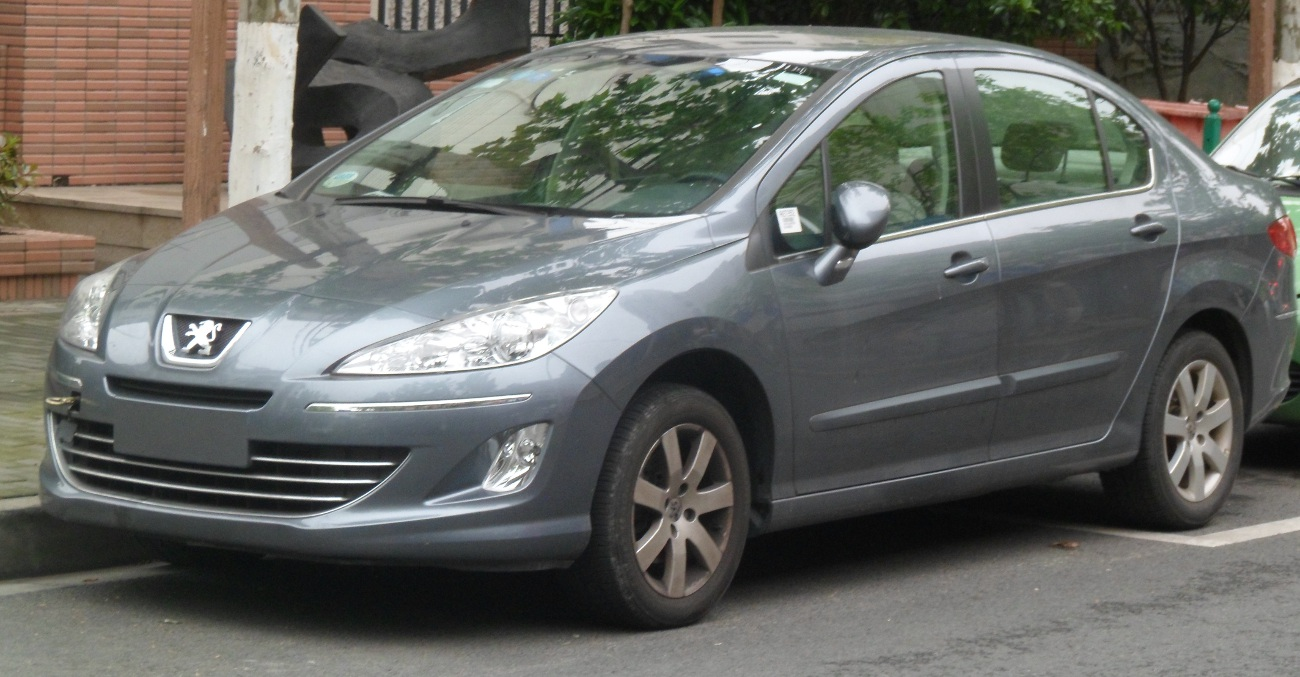

Overview
- Production: 2010–2021
- Assembly: Argentina: El Palomar (PSA Argentina); China: Wuhan (DPCA); Malaysia: Gurun (NAM); Russia: Kaluga (PCMA Rus)

Body and chassis
- Platform: PSA PF2 platform
- Related: Peugeot 308; Dongfeng Fengshen L60

Powertrain
- Engine: Petrol: 1.6 L TU5JP4 I4; 1.6 L Prince turbo I4; 2.0 L EW10A+ I4; diesel: 1.6 L DV6 HDi I4
- Transmission: 5-speed manual 4-speed automatic 6-speed EAT6 automatic

Dimensions
- Wheelbase: 2,710 mm (106.7 in)
- Length: 4,680 mm (184.3 in)
- Width: 1,815 mm (71.5 in)
- Height: 1,525 mm (60.0 in)

Chronology
- Predecessor: Peugeot 307 saloon

The 408 was available in China with either a 1.6 L and 2.0 L petrol four-cylinder engine. The 1.6 (TU5JP4) has a capacity of 1587 cc and produces 85 kW (115 PS; 113 hp) at 5,750 rpm and maximum torque of 147 N⋅m (108 lb⋅ft) at 4,000 rpm. The 2.0 L (EW10A+) engine has a capacity of 1997 cc and produces 110 kW (150 PS; 148 hp) at 6,000 rpm and 200 N⋅m (148 lb⋅ft) at 4,000 rpm.

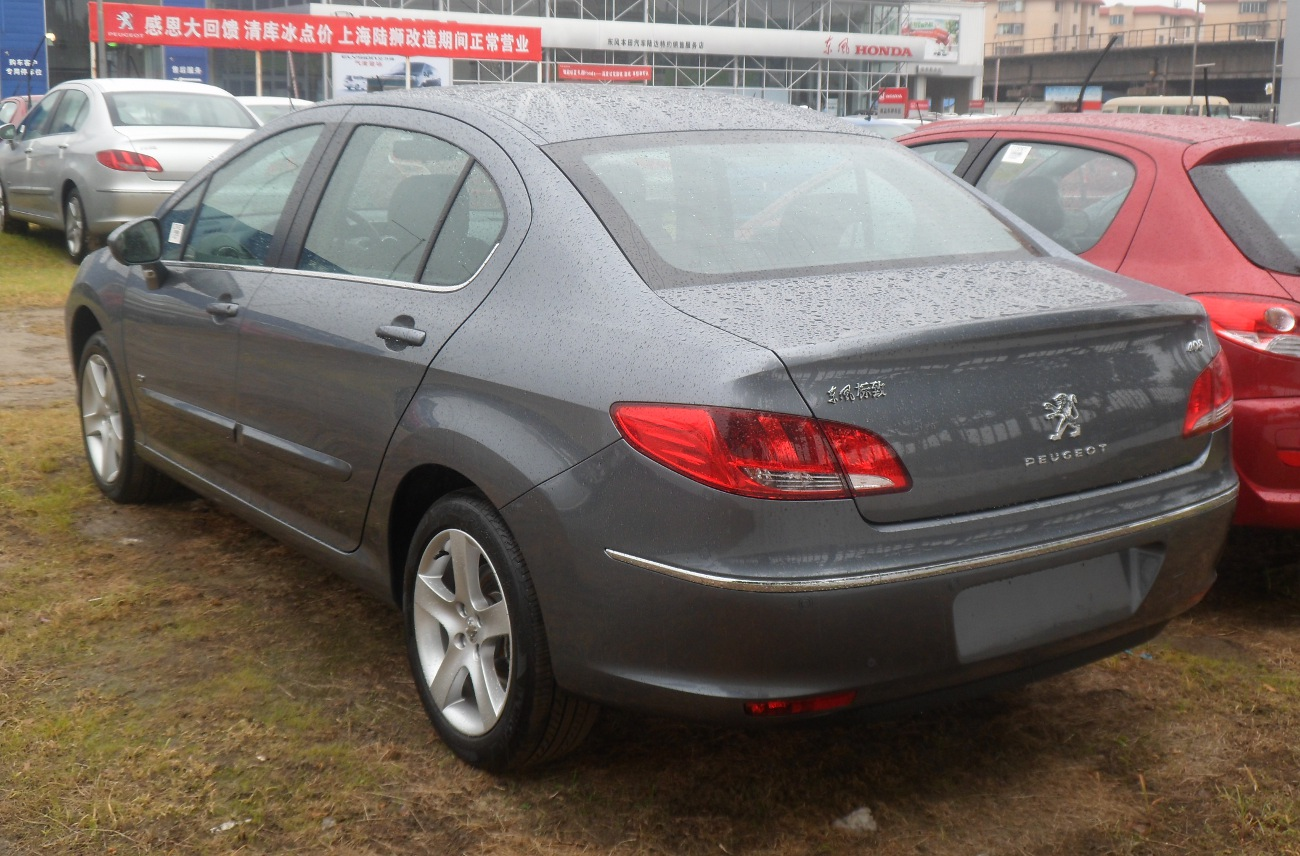
Rear view (pre-facelift)

Either engine can be specified with a 5-speed manual or 4-speed automatic transmission.

In South America a 1.6 L diesel engine, known as a HDi (Allure, Feline/Griffe), is sold alongside the 2.0 L petrol engine (Allure, Feline/Griffe) and 1.6 L THP petrol engine (Sport) with 6-speed automatic transmission. The four-cylinder diesel has a capacity of 1560 cc and produces 81 kW (110 PS; 109 hp) and torque of 240 N⋅m (177 lb⋅ft).

The HDi has a top speed of 188 km/h (116.8 mph) and accelerates to 100 km/h (62 mph) in 12.4 seconds.

In Malaysia, 408 comes with two engines, the 1.6 L Prince turbo engine and 2.0 L petrol four-cylinder engine. The 1.6 L engine produces 123 kW (167 PS; 165 hp) at 6,000 rpm and a maximum torque of 240 N⋅m (177 lb⋅ft) from 1,400 rpm.

The 2.0 L (EW10A+) engine has a capacity of 1997 cc and produces 145 bhp (108 kW; 147 PS) at rpm and 200 N⋅m (148 lb⋅ft) at 4,000 rpm. The 1.6 L turbo engine comes mated with a 6-speed manual, while the 2.0 L engine is fitted with a 4-speed automatic adaptive gearbox with Tiptronic and Sport mode only.

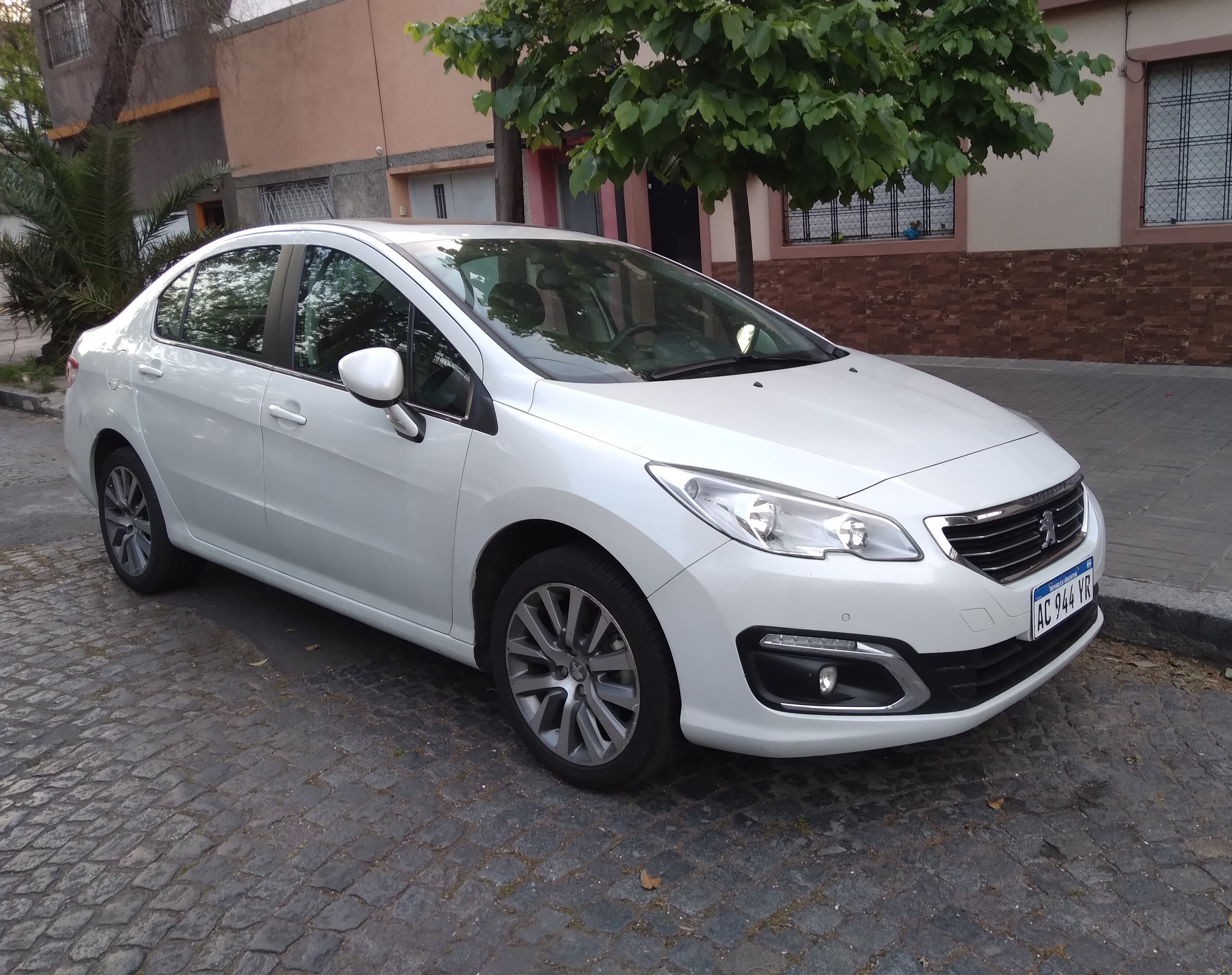
Peugeot 408, Argentina (facelift)

The first generation 408 continued in production in Latin America and Russia, with multiple facelifts and minor changes. Production in Argentina was halted in 2021.

== Second generation (T9; 2014) ==
Second generation
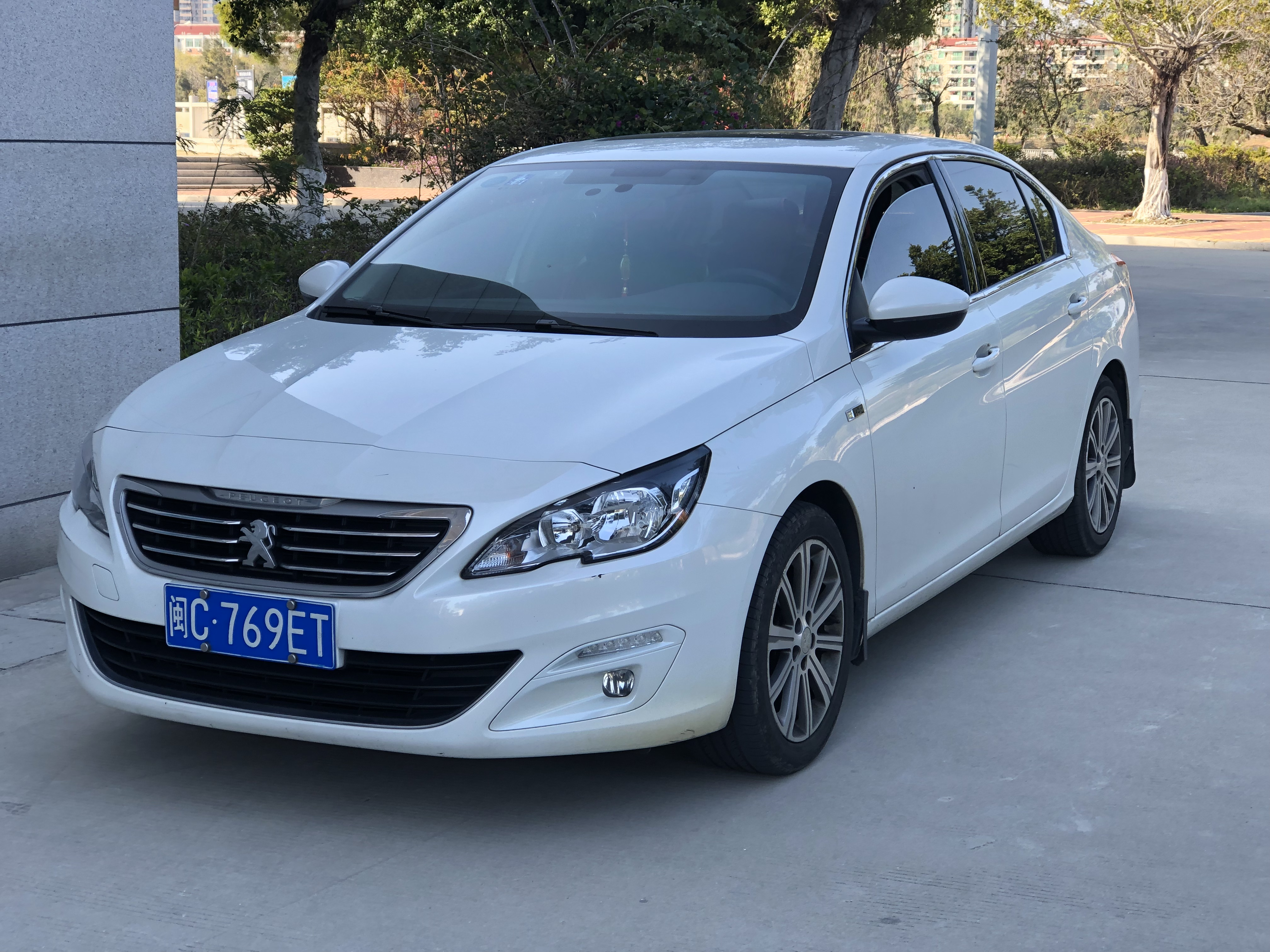
- Peugeot 408 II (China) pre-facelift (front)

Overview
- Also called: Dongfeng Fukang ES600 (electric); FMC P4 (Iran)
- Production: 2014–present 2016–2018 (Malaysia)
- Assembly: China: Wuhan (DPCA); Malaysia: Gurun (NAM); Iran: Semnan (FMC)

Body and chassis
- Body style: 4-door saloon
- Platform: PSA EMP2 platform
- Related: Peugeot 308

Powertrain
- Engine: Petrol: 1.2 L VTi I3 (2014–2017); 1.2 L PureTech turbo I3; 1.5 L 360 THP Prince turbo I4; 1.6 L EP6FDTM Prince turbo I4; 1.8 L EW7 CVVT I4 (2014–2017)
- Transmission: 6-speed automatic

Dimensions
- Wheelbase: 2,730 mm (107.5 in)
- Length: 4,750 mm (187.0 in)
- Width: 1,820 mm (71.7 in)
- Height: 1,488 mm (58.6 in)
- Curb weight: 1,420 kg (3,130.6 lb); 1,373 kg, 1,402 kg (2022 facelift)

Chronology
- Predecessor: Peugeot 308 saloon

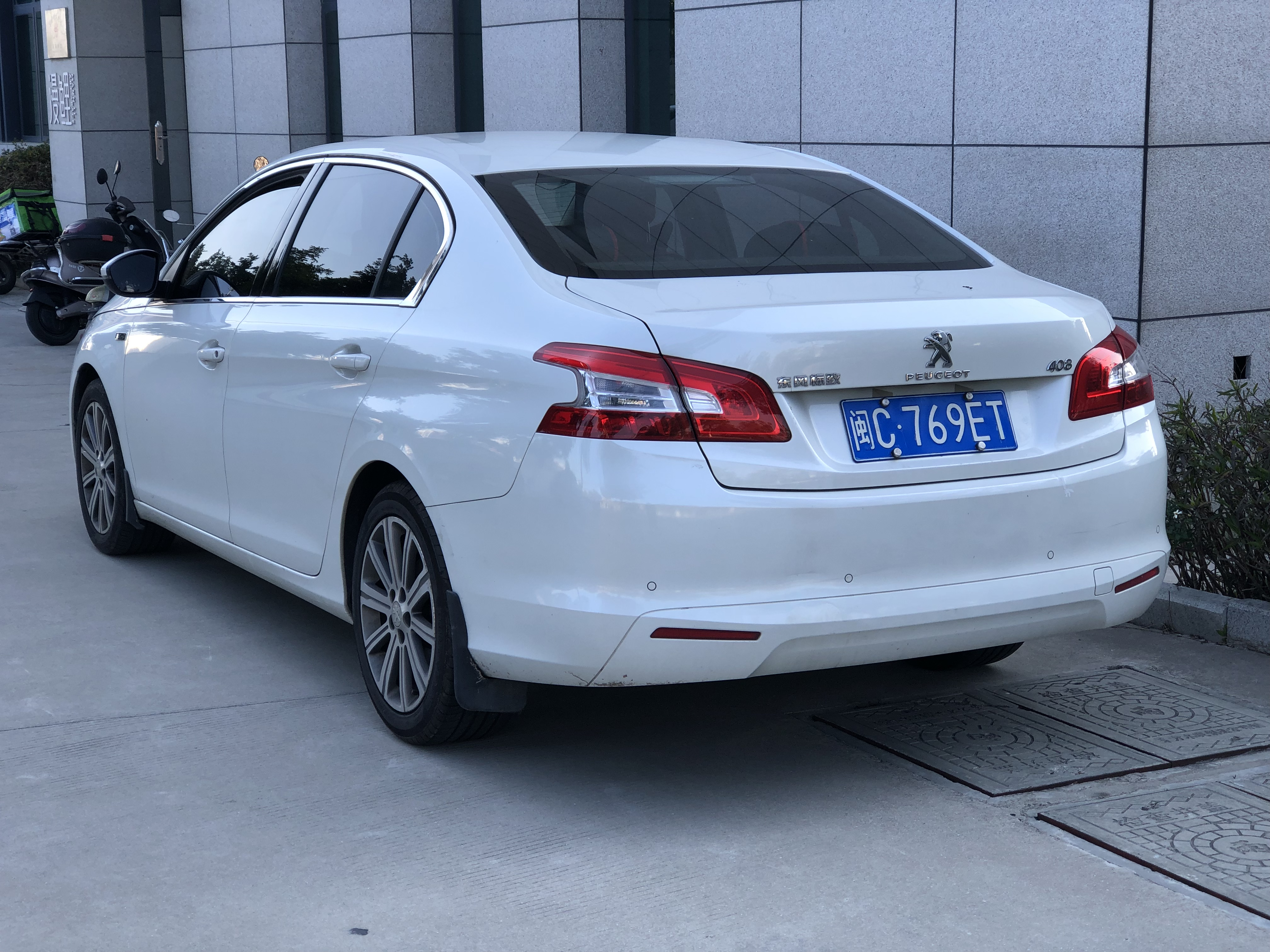
Rear view (pre-facelift; China)

The second generation Peugeot 408 was unveiled in the 2014 Beijing Auto Show. In June 2016, the international version of the Peugeot 408 (known as Peugeot 408 e-THP) was launched in Malaysia, though with only one engine choice and transmission. The second generation 408 launched in China is powered by a range of engine options including a 1.8-litre engine producing 139 hp (104 kW; 141 PS), a 1.2-litre turbo engine with 136 hp (101 kW; 138 PS), and 1.6-litre turbo engine with 167 hp (125 kW; 169 PS). All engines are mated with a 6-speed automatic transmission, with a 6-speed manual transmission option also available for the 1.8-litre and 1.2-litre engines.

=== 2018 facelift ===
A first facelift was launched in 2018, featuring a redesigned front fascia, rear bumper, and tail lamps. Powertrain is carried over from the pre-facelift model.

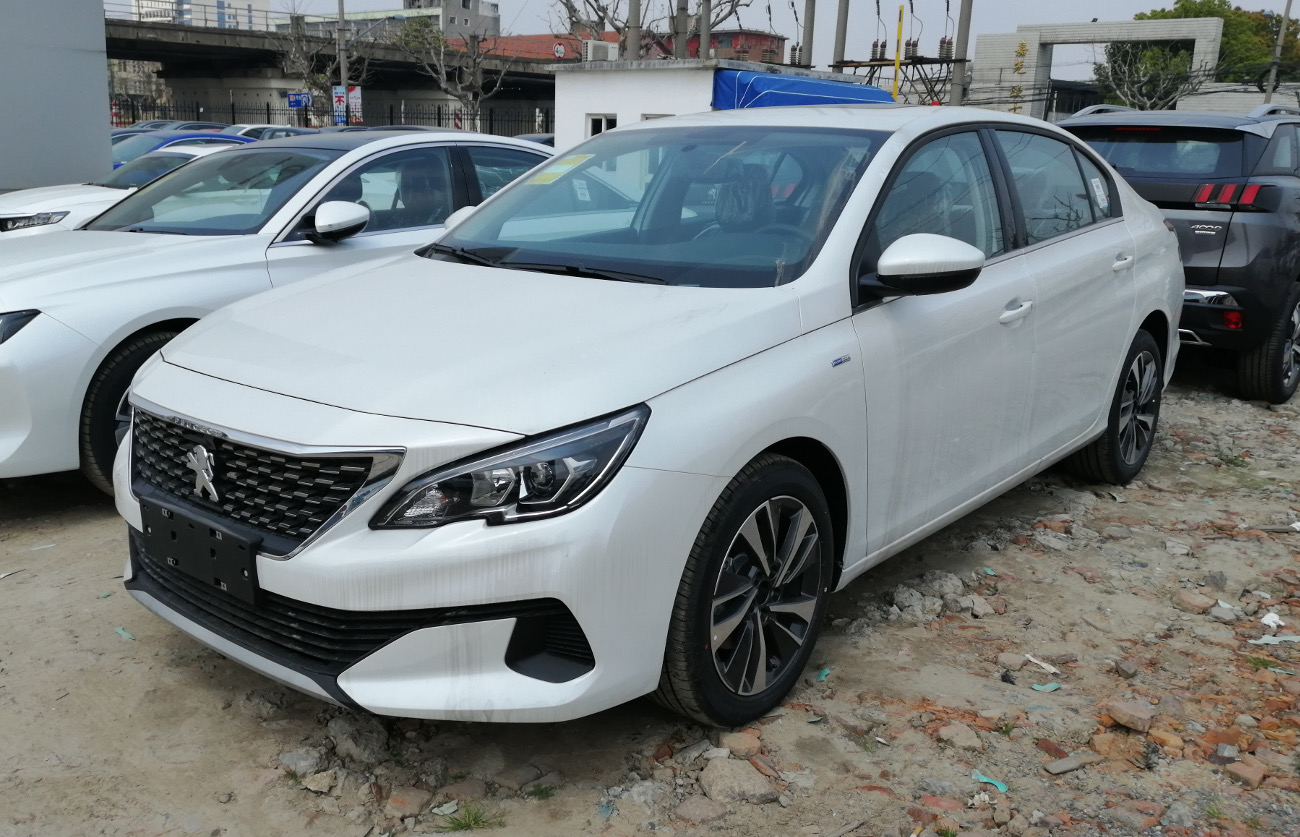
Peugeot 408 II, first facelift (front)

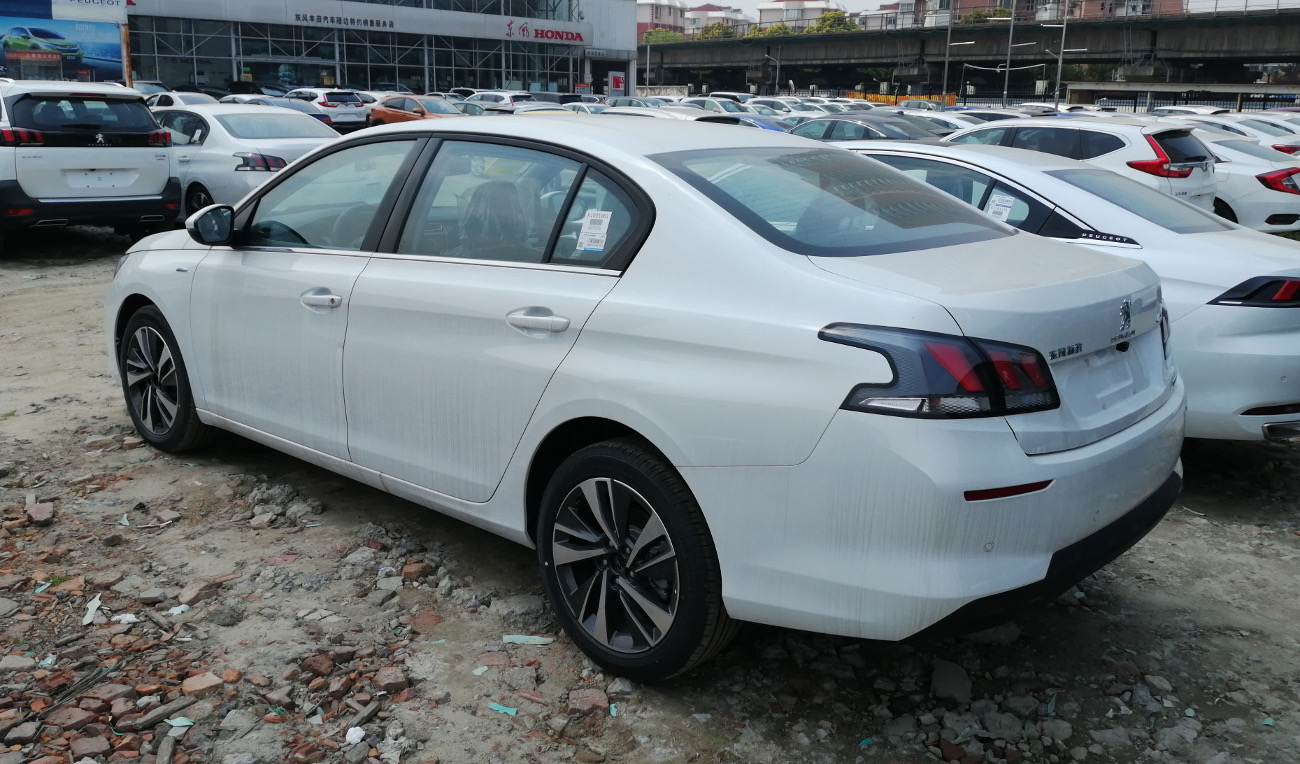
Peugeot 408 II, first facelift (rear)

=== 2022 facelift ===
A second facelift for the 408 was revealed for the Chinese market on 8 June 2022. The front end is redesigned to reflect the same design language as the third-generation Peugeot 308. The bootlid is redesigned, featuring new graphics and taillights similar to the third-generation 308.

All trim levels are equipped with a model 5G06 1.6-litre turbo engine producing 125 kW (168 hp; 170 PS) at 5,500 rpm and 250 N⋅m (184 lb⋅ft) at 1,750-4,500 rpm, and an Aisin 3rd generation 6AT transmission.

In March 2024, the new 1.5 THP 360 engine was introduced producing 127 kW (170 hp; 173 PS) at 5,500 rpm and 255 N⋅m (188 lb⋅ft) at 1,750-4,500 rpm.

The 2027 model year was released on 6 November 2026 and is available exclusively with the 360THP engine and features two new exterior paint colors: South France Yellow and Sycamore Green.

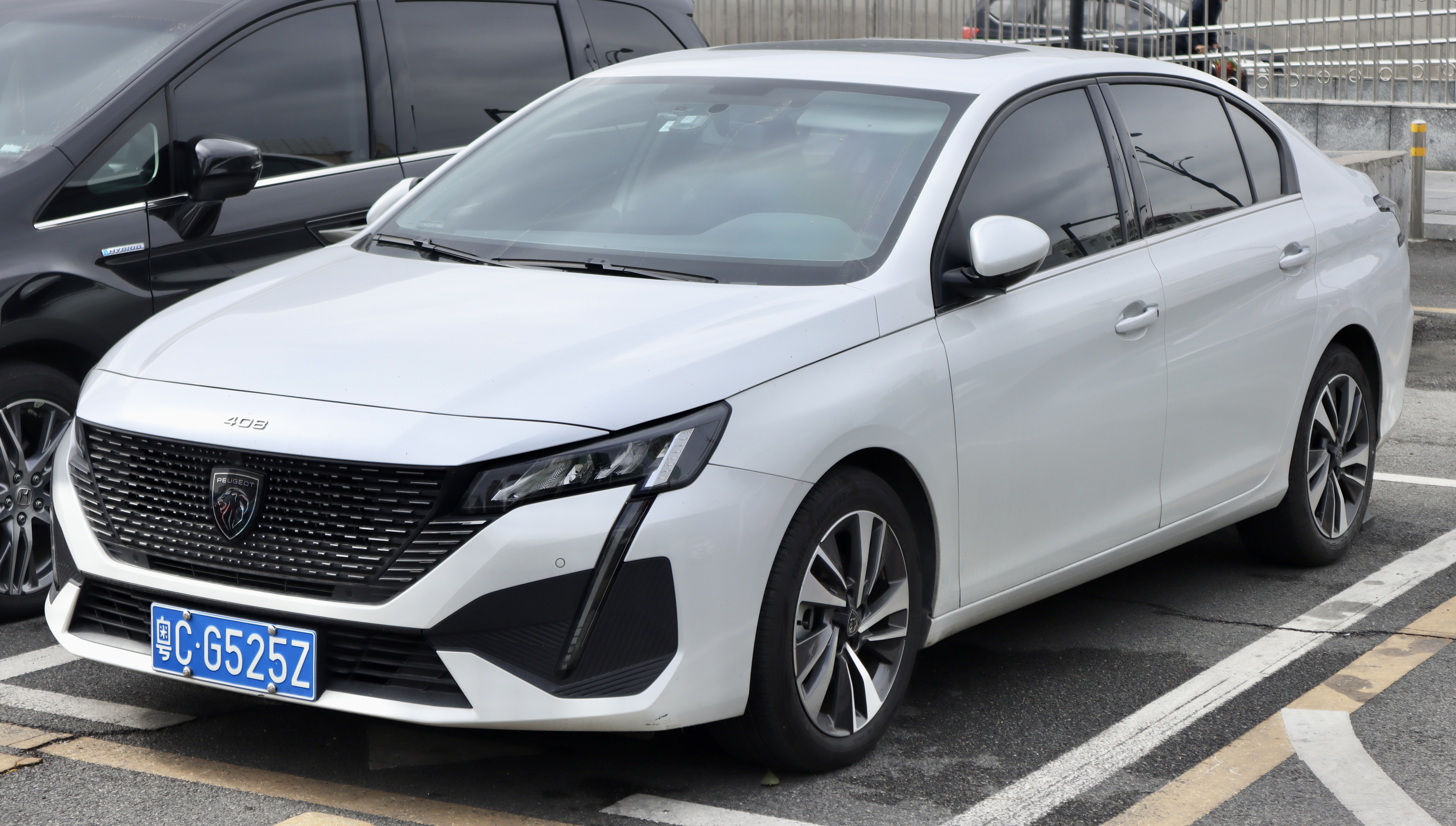
Peugeot 408 II second facelift (front)

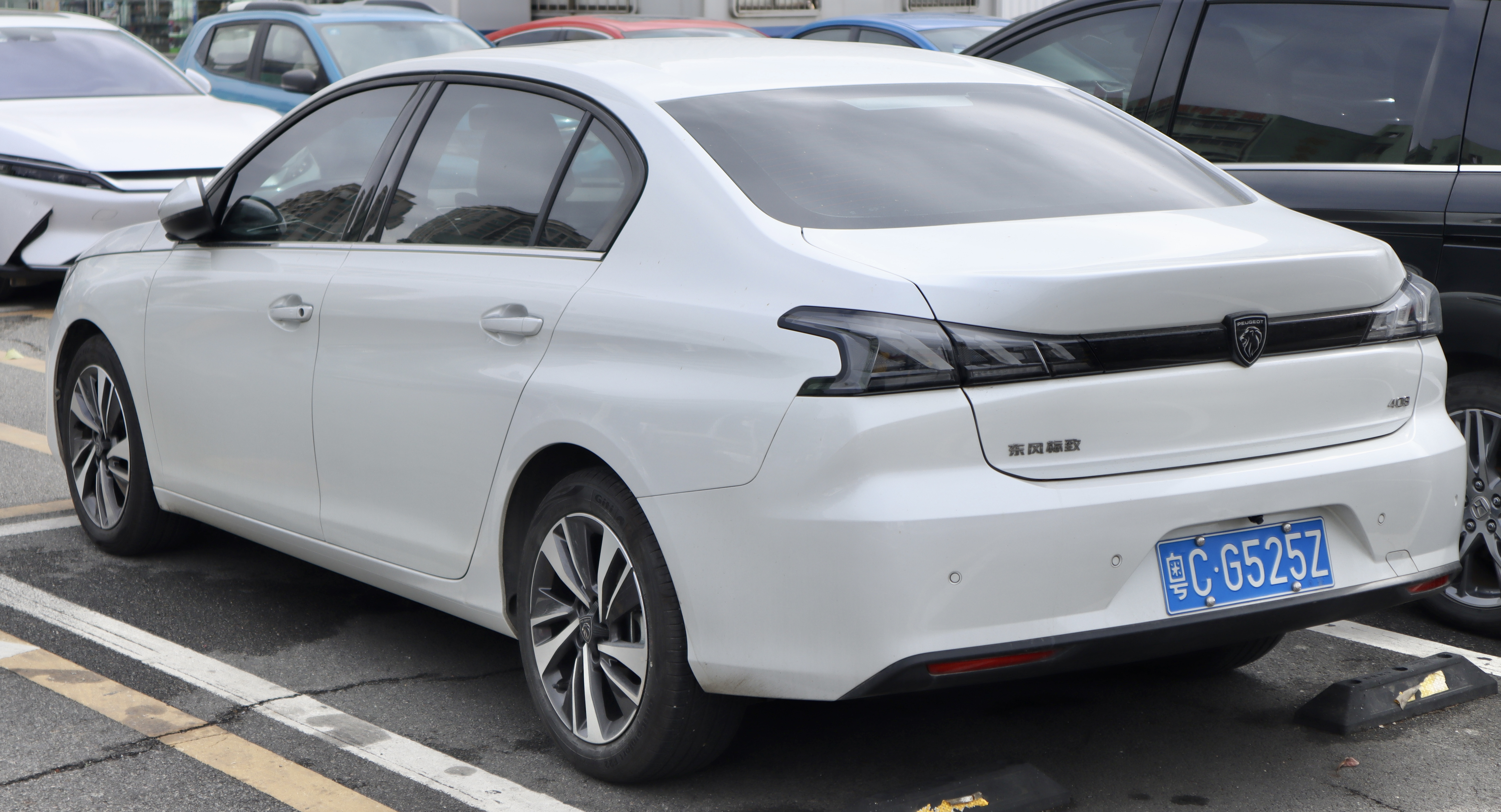
Peugeot 408 II second facelift (rear)

=== Dongfeng Fukang ES600 ===
The Dongfeng Fukang ES600 is an electric sedan based on the 2014–2018 pre-facelift Peugeot 408, launched under Dongfeng Peugeot-Citroën's Fukang brand.

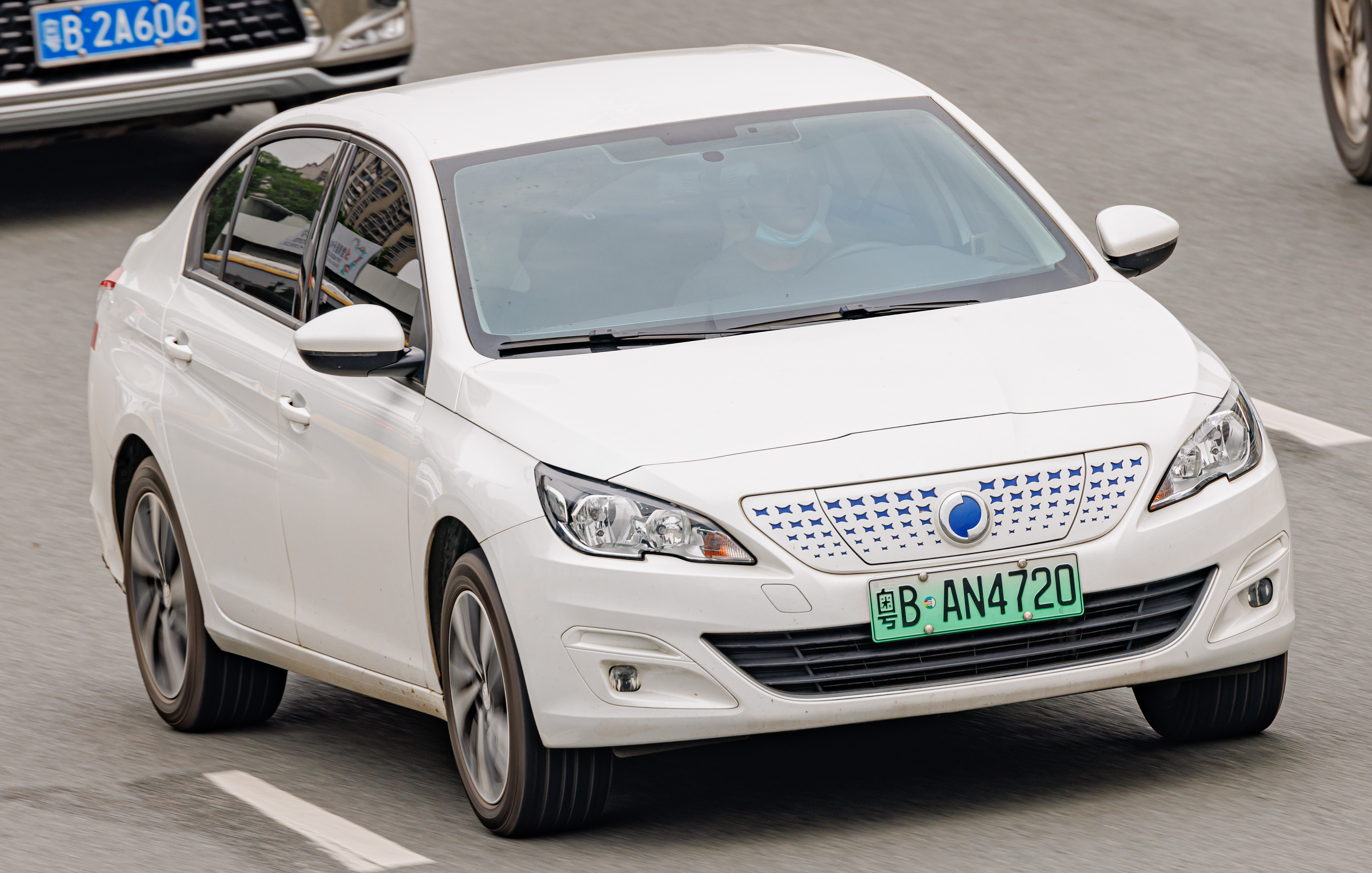
Dongfeng Fukang ES600

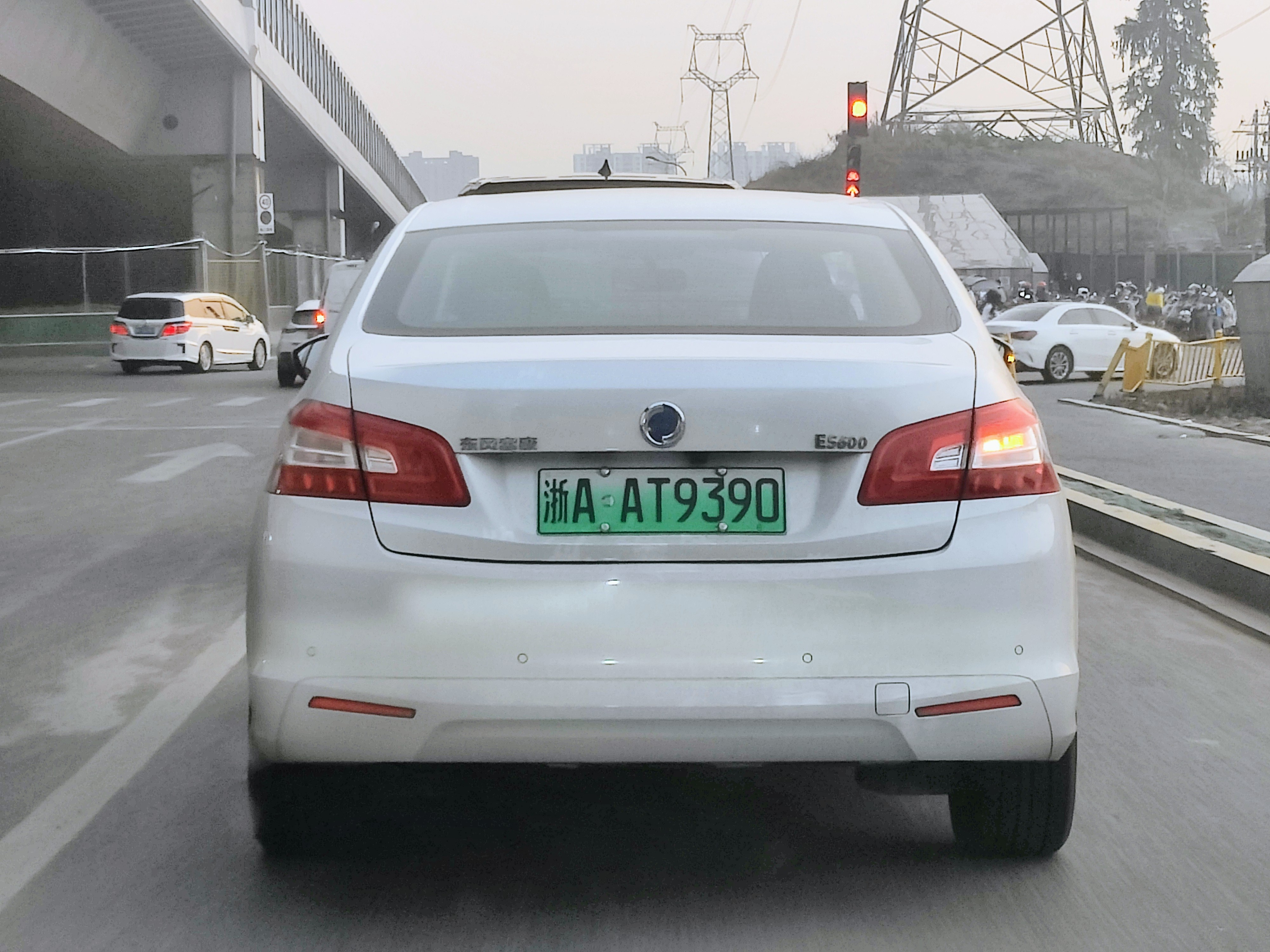
Dongfeng Fukang ES600 rear

== Sales ==
Year	Brazil	China
2011	6,564	
2012	7,711	
2013	4,618	
2014	3,332	
2015	1,427	
2016	927	
2017	1,118	
2018	739	
2019	122	
2020	2	
2021		
2022		
2023		13,906
2024		19,337
2025		13,474
