= 2026 Stock Light =

Car racing competition

The 2026 Stock Light is the 33rd season of Stock Light, the feeder series to the Stock Car Pro Series.

== Calendar ==
Round	Circuit (Event)	Dates	Support bill	Map
1	(São Paulo (state)) Autódromo José Carlos Pace; São Paulo, São Paulo	24–26 April	TCR South America Touring Car Championship; TCR Brazil Touring Car Championship; Stock Car Pro Series; F4 Brazilian Championship	2026 Stock Light is located in Brazil
2	(Goiás) Autódromo Internacional Ayrton Senna; Goiânia, GO	15–17 May	Stock Car Pro Series; Turismo Nacional BR	2026 Stock Light is located in Brazil
3	Autódromo Internacional de Mato Grosso; Cuiabá, Mato Grosso	19–20 June	TCR South America Touring Car Championship; TCR Brazil Touring Car Championship; Stock Car Pro Series; Turismo Nacional BR	2026 Stock Light is located in Brazil
4	(São Paulo (state)) Autódromo Velo Città; Mogi Guaçu, São Paulo	24–26 July	TCR South America Touring Car Championship; TCR Brazil Touring Car Championship; Stock Car Pro Series; F4 Brazilian Championship	2026 Stock Light is located in Brazil
5	Circuito dos Cristais; Curvelo, Minas Gerais	4–6 September	Stock Car Pro Series; Turismo Nacional BR	2026 Stock Light is located in Brazil
6	(Federal District (Brazil)) Autódromo Internacional de Brasília (Corrida do Milhão); Brasília, Distrito Federal	25–27 September	Stock Car Pro Series; F4 Brazilian Championship; Turismo Nacional BR	2026 Stock Light is located in Brazil
7	(São Paulo (state)) Autódromo José Carlos Pace (Super Final); São Paulo, São Paulo	11–13 December	Stock Car Pro Series; F4 Brazilian Championship; Turismo Nacional BR	2026 Stock Light is located in Brazil

== Entry list ==
All cars are powered by V8 engines and use the JL chassis.

Team	No.	Driver	Status	Rounds	Co-Driver
Artcon Racing	3	(Brazil) Firas Fahs	R	1	
Artcon Racing	14	(Brazil) Enzo Nienkoter	R	1	(Brazil) Sérgio Sete Câmara
Artcon Racing	63	(Brazil) Luís Trombini	R	1	(Brazil) Zezinho Muggiati
SG28 Racing	17	(Brazil) Juninho Berlanda	R	1	(Brazil) Gabriel Casagrande
SG28 Racing	98	(Brazil) Enzo Bedani		1	(Brazil) Matheus Morgatto
Garra Racing	16	(Brazil) Mathias de Valle		1	
Garra Racing	80	(Brazil) João Bortoluzzi		1	(Brazil) Raphael Abbate
Garra Racing	111	(Brazil) Leonardo Rufino		1	
Garra Racing	52	(Brazil) Carlos Gomes		1	(Brazil) Thiago Riberi
CAR Racing	116	(Brazil) Alexandre Bastos		1	(Brazil) Felipe Baptista
CAR Racing	88	(Brazil) Augusto Sangalli		1	(Brazil) Leonardo Reis
MForce	8	(Brazil) Richard Annunziata		1	
MForce	99	(Brazil) Enzo Falquete		1	(Brazil) Firas Fahs
MForce	37	(Brazil) Dorivaldo Gondra		1	(Brazil) Raphael Teixeira
RTR Sport Team	218	(Brazil) Vinícius Papareli		1	(Brazil) Rafael Martins
RTR Sport Team	12	(Brazil) Fausto Filho		1	(Brazil) Sérgio Jimenez
w2 ProGP	77	(Brazil) Erick Schotten		1	(Brazil) Danilo Dirani
w2 ProGP	26	(Brazil) Kaká Magno	F	1	(Brazil) Pedro Lozov
w2 ProGP	33	(Brazil) Victor Tieri		1	(Brazil) Nelson Piquet Jr
w2 ProGP	15	(Brazil) Lucas Moura		1	(Brazil) Arthur Gama
w2 ProGP	7	(Brazil) Gabriel Koenigkan	R	1	(Brazil) Gaetano di Mauro

Note:

Icon	Status
R	Rookie
F	Female

== Championship standings ==
Points system

Points are awarded for each race at an event to the driver/s of a car that completed at least 75% of the race distance and was running at the completion of the race. The two worst results are discarded. Races in which a driver has been disqualified cannot be discarded. The third race of each event is held with partially reversed top eight grid.

Points format	Position																			
Points format	1st	2nd	3rd	4th	5th	6th	7th	8th	9th	10th	11th	12th	13th	14th	15th	16th	17th	18th	19th	20th
Race 1 and 2	30	26	22	19	17	15	14	13	12	11	10	9	8	7	6	5	4	3	2	1
Race 3	24	20	18	17	16	15	14	13	12	11	10	9	8	7	6	5	4	3	2	1

Drivers' Championship (Note: Points total shown excluding the 2 lowest scores before the final round, which are dropped.)

Pos	Driver	(São Paulo (state)) INT1			(Goiás) GOI			(Mato Grosso) CUI			(Rio Grande do Sul) VEL			(Minas Gerais) CUR			(Federal District (Brazil)) BRA	(São Paulo (state)) INT1			Pts
Pos	Driver	RD1	RD2	RD3	RD1	RD2	RD3	RD1	RD2	RD3	RD1	RD2	RD3	RD1	RD2	RD3	EDC	RD1	RD2	RD3	Pts
1	(Federal District (Brazil)) Gabriel Koenigkan	2	2	1	1	1	14	2	1	8	1	2	4	2	1	8	3				418
2	(São Paulo (state)) Enzo Bedani	3	3	5	2	5	3	15	7	4	4	3	5	7	Ret	DNS	5				282
3	(São Paulo (state)) Vinícius Paparelli	7	18	9	11	9	8	3	3	9	2	4	2	3	10	Ret	7				264
4	(Santa Catarina (state)) Érick Schotten	8	5	Ret	6	2	2	9	2	2	6	DNS	DNS	5	2	4	13				256
5	(São Paulo (state)) Victor Tieri	1	1	2	Ret	DNS	DNS	13	Ret	11	3	1	1	15	13	6	4				252
6	(Paraná (state)) Luís Trombini	6	7	3	9	13	Ret	10	10	5	7	9	8	9	7	5	1				247
7	(Santa Catarina (state)) Alexandre Bastos	Ret	10	13	4	3	5	6	5	7	12	7	7	1	9	1	14				240
8	(Santa Catarina (state)) João Bortoluzzi	12	11	6	13	7	1	1	4	1	10	11	Ret	4	4	11	15				236
9	(Paraná (state)) Enzo Falquete	14	6	Ret	7	6	13	5	12	3	8	8	3	12	6	3	8				224
10	(São Paulo (state)) Augusto Sangalli	Ret	8	11	8	8	4	12	11	12	Ret	12	12	11	3	Ret	11				181
11	(Goiás) Fausto Ribeiro Filho	10	19	12	Ret	Ret	Ret	7	15	DNS	Ret	10	6	10	8	2	2				169
12	(Santa Catarina (state)) Juninho Berlanda	5	14	DNS	5	15	Ret	8	6	14	11	6	DNS	6	5	7	17				153
13	(Minas Gerais) Lucas Moura	15	9	8	DSQ	12	9	19	13	Ret	9	5	9	13	Ret	Ret	6				153
14	(Paraná (state)) Kaká Magno	13	17	14	12	14	10	18	14	13	14	13	11	14	11	9	9				152
15	(São Paulo (state)) Leonardo Rufino	9	13	7	3	4	6	4	Ret	DNQ											109
16	(Santa Catarina (state)) Enzo Nienkotter	11	16	Ret	10	10	11	17	9	6	13	Ret	DNQ	8	Ret	DNS	16				99
17	(Paraná (state)) Firas Fahs	Ret	12	10	14	16	12	14	16	DNQ	5	DSQ	DSQ				8				70
18	(Minas Gerais) Carlos Gomes										15	14	10	Ret	12	10	12				68
19	(Goiás) Mathias de Valle	4	4	4	Ret	17	DNS	16	Ret	DNS											64
20	(São Paulo (state)) Richard Annuziata	Ret	15	Ret	Ret	11	7	11	8	10											64
21	(Paraná (state)) Zezinho Muggiati																1				30
22	(São Paulo (state)) Sérgio Jimenez																2				26
23	(São Paulo (state)) Gaetano di Mauro																3				22
24	(Federal District (Brazil)) Nelson Piquet Jr.																4				19
25	(São Paulo (state)) Matheus Morgatto																5				17
26	(Rio Grande do Sul) Arthur Gama																6				15
27	(São Paulo (state)) Rafael Martins																7				14
28	(São Paulo (state)) Pedro Lozov																9				12
29	(Pernambuco) Dorivaldo Gondra																10				11
30	(Goiás) Raphael Teixeira																10				11
31	(São Paulo (state)) Leonardo Reis																11				10
32	(São Paulo (state)) Thiago Riberi																12				9
33	(São Paulo (state)) Danilo Dirani																13				8
34	(São Paulo (state)) Felipe Baptista																14				7
35	(São Paulo (state)) Raphael Abbate																15				6
36	(Minas Gerais) Sérgio Sette Câmara																16				5
37	(Paraná (state)) Gabriel Casagrande																17				4
Pos	Driver	RD1	RD2	RD3	RD1	RD2	RD3	RD1	RD2	RD3	RD1	RD2	RD3	RD1	RD2	RD3	EDC	RD1	RD2	RD3	Pts
Pos	Driver	(São Paulo (state)) INT1			(Goiás) GOI			(Mato Grosso) CUI			(Rio Grande do Sul) VEL			(Minas Gerais) CUR			(Federal District (Brazil)) BRA	(São Paulo (state)) INT1			Pts
