= Felipe Barrichello Bartz =

Brazilian racing driver (born 2005)

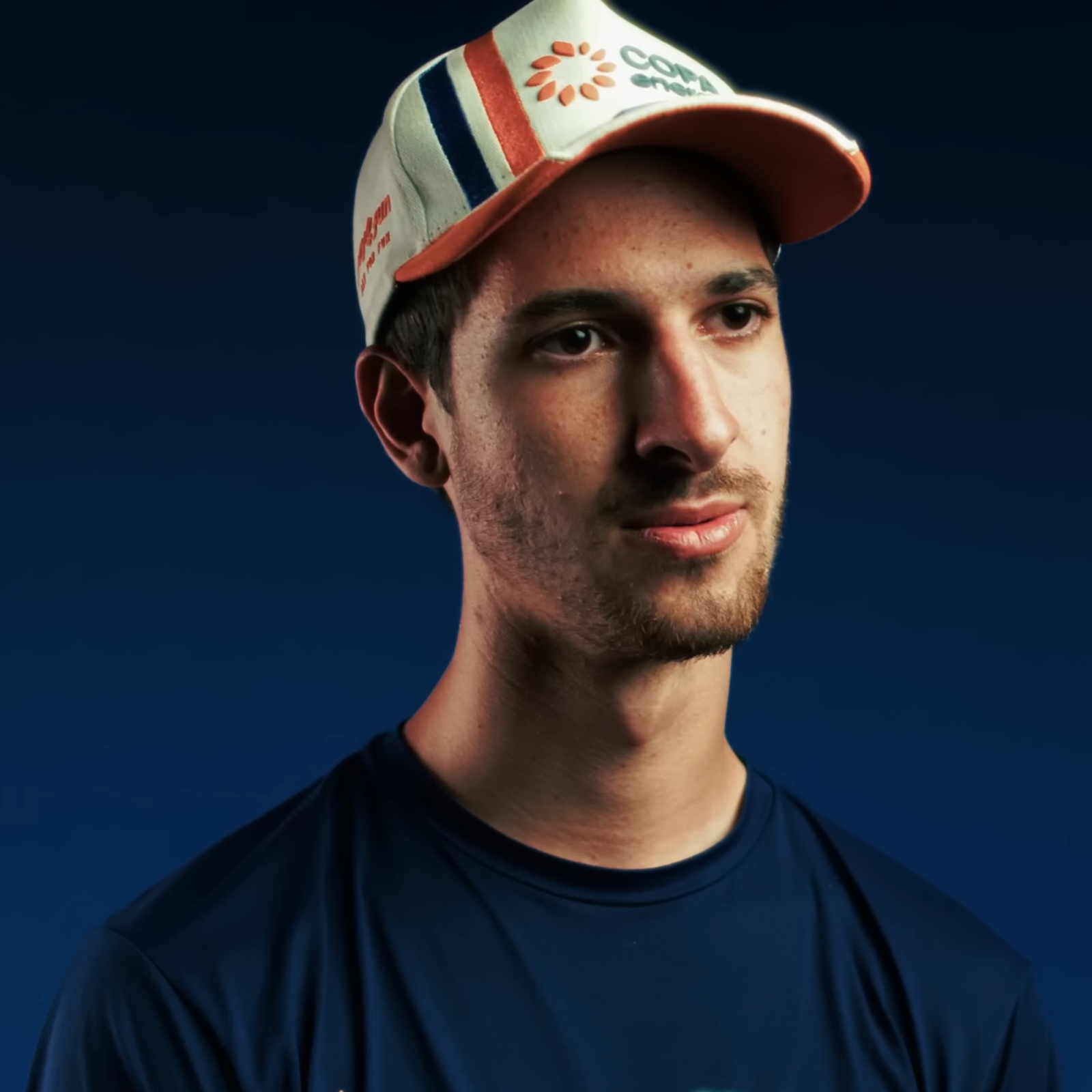
- Bartz in 2025
- Nationality: (Brazil) Brazilian
- Born: 27 May 2005 (age 21) São Paulo, Brazil
- Relatives: Rubens Barrichello (Uncle); Eduardo Barrichello (Cousin); Fernando Barrichello (Cousin)

Stock Car Pro Series career
- Debut season: 2026
- Current team: Albatroz Racing
- Car number: 24
- Former teams: SG28 Team
- Starts: 4
- Wins: 0
- Poles: 0
- Fastest laps: 0

Previous series
- 2023-2025 2022: Stock Light; F4 Brazilian Championship

Championship titles
- 2025: Stock Light

Felipe "Pipe" Barrichello Bartz (born 27 May 2005) is a Brazilian racing driver who competes in Stock Car Pro Series for Albatroz Racing. He is the 2025 Stock Light champion.

== Early life ==
Born in São Paulo, Felipe Barrichello Bartz is the oldest son of Renata Barrichello and Christian Bartz. His mother has a degree in Business Administration from FGV, a master's degree in Public Relations from USP and works as an executive. His father is racing driver, competing in Brazilian karting championships. Felipe also has two younger siblings, Manuela and Gustavo, twins born in 2009. On his mother's side, Pipe is the nephew of Rubens Barrichello, former Formula 1 driver and two-time Stock Car champion, great-nephew of Dárcio Gonçalves dos Santos, businessman, founder and owner of PropCar Racing, and is cousin of the racing drivers Eduardo and Fernando Barrichello. He is fan of Jeff Gordon, four-time NASCAR champion, having chosen the number 24 to adorn his cars because of him.

== Career ==
=== Karting ===
Bartz began his motorsport career at the age of four, using a family go-kart. He competed in numerous national and international championships, often facing his cousin Fefo Barrichello, as well as other drivers of his generation, such as Nicolas Giaffone, Roberto Faria, Zezinho Muggiati, Gabriel Gomez and Rafael Câmara. Bartz was runner-up in the Florida Winter Tour in 2015, and also runner-up in the South American Rotax Junior Championship. In 2017, he won his first national title, the Brazilian Rotax Junior Championship, after Câmara was penalized in the final race, and was champion again in 2018, even though he tied in points with Gomez. That same year, Bartz won the Brazilian Kart Open, also in the Junior class. He competed full-time in karting until 2019. In 2022, he was champion of the São Paulo Kart Cup in the Rotax Max class. He competed in the RMC Winter Trophy in 2024 in the Senior Max class.

=== Formula 4 ===
After competing in two races of the São Paulo Super Formula Championship (successor to Brazilian Formula Three) in 2020, Bartz participated in the inaugural season of the F4 Brazilian Championship in 2022. Racing for Cavaleiro Sports, he had Nic Giaffone as one of his teammates, and once again faced his cousin Fefo. Bartz got his first podium in race two of the opening round at Velo Città, where he finished second. He repeated the result in the second race of the fourth round, also at Velo Città, where he finished ahead of his cousin Fefo, but behind his friend Nic. His first pole position was at race one in Goiânia, which also marked his first victory. Bartz won again at race one of last round in Interlagos, got another podium at race three. At the end of season, Bartz qualified fourth in the drivers' championship, scoring 135 points.

=== Stock Light ===
In 2023, Bartz migrated to Stock Series, the first access category to Stock Car Pro Series. He joined W2 ProGP, reigning teams' champion, driving the No. 24 Chevrolet Cruze. Bartz got six podiums in his rookie season, with second place as his best result, which he achieved in Cascavel and Velopark. He ended as fourth place in drivers' championship, being also the second at Rookie class.

Bartz continued in Stock Series for 2024, renewing with W2 ProGP and aiming for the title. He got his first win at third race in opening round at Interlagos, and won again in race 2 of the final round, held at the same track. Bartz ended his second season at Stock Series with four fastest laps, seven podiums, including two victories, and 285 points, which again earned him fourth place in the drivers' championship.

Bartz continued in the category for 2025, which was renamed Stock Light, but moved to SG28 Racing, having his presence confirmed a few days before the start of the championship. He achieved his first victory of the year at second race in Interlagos, and had his apex at Cascavel round, winning the first two races and being second in race three. He arrived at the Super Final in Brasília in the fight for the title, occupying the second place in the table, having as rivals Enzo Bedani, leading by two points difference, and the rookie Léo Reis (then third place). Bartz did not win any of the races, while Reis won the last two and Bedani was outside the top-ten, but went to the podium in all three, with the third place in race 1 being a result sufficient to guarantee him the title. In total, there were twelve podium finishes, the highest number of the season, and Bartz ended his third year in Stock Light with 343 points, 29 ahead of runner-up Léo Reis, and 47 more than Enzo Bedani.

=== Stock Car Pro Series ===
Bartz's 2025 Stock Light title earned him a prize of R$ 2,5 million, to finance a spot in the 2026 Stock Car Pro Series season. In February 2026, he was confirmed in the rookie team SG28, the same team with which he won the Stock Light championship, driving the Mitsubishi Eclipse Cross #24.

In the opening round at Curvelo, Bartz saw his teammates Tatiana Calderón and Bruna Tomaselli sidelined due to a lack of parts for their cars, with SG28 combining parts from their cars to build one and give it to Rafael Martins. However, SG28's technical problems persisted, and Bartz and the team were absent from the following round in Cascavel. The Stock Car Pro Series organization ended up barring SG28 Racing from competing for the rest of the season, giving the spot to the newcomer Albatroz Racing. Thus, Bartz ended up being hired by Albatroz to compete in Stock Car rounds starting from the third round, held at Interlagos.

== Racing career summary ==
Season	Series	Team	Races	Wins	Poles	F/Laps	Podiums	Points	Position
2022	F4 Brazilian Championship	Cavaleiro Sports	18	2	2	3	5	135	4th
2023	Stock Series	W2 ProGP	18	0	0	0	6	274	4th
2024	Stock Series	W2 ProGP	18	2	0	4	7	285	4th
2025	Stock Light	SG28 Racing	18	3	2	3	12	343	1st
2026	Stock Car Pro Series	SG28 Team	2	0	0	0	0	23	32th*
2026	Stock Car Pro Series	Albatroz Racing	2	0	0	0	0	23	32th*

* Season in progress.
