= Enzo Bedani =

Brazilian racing driver (born 2008)

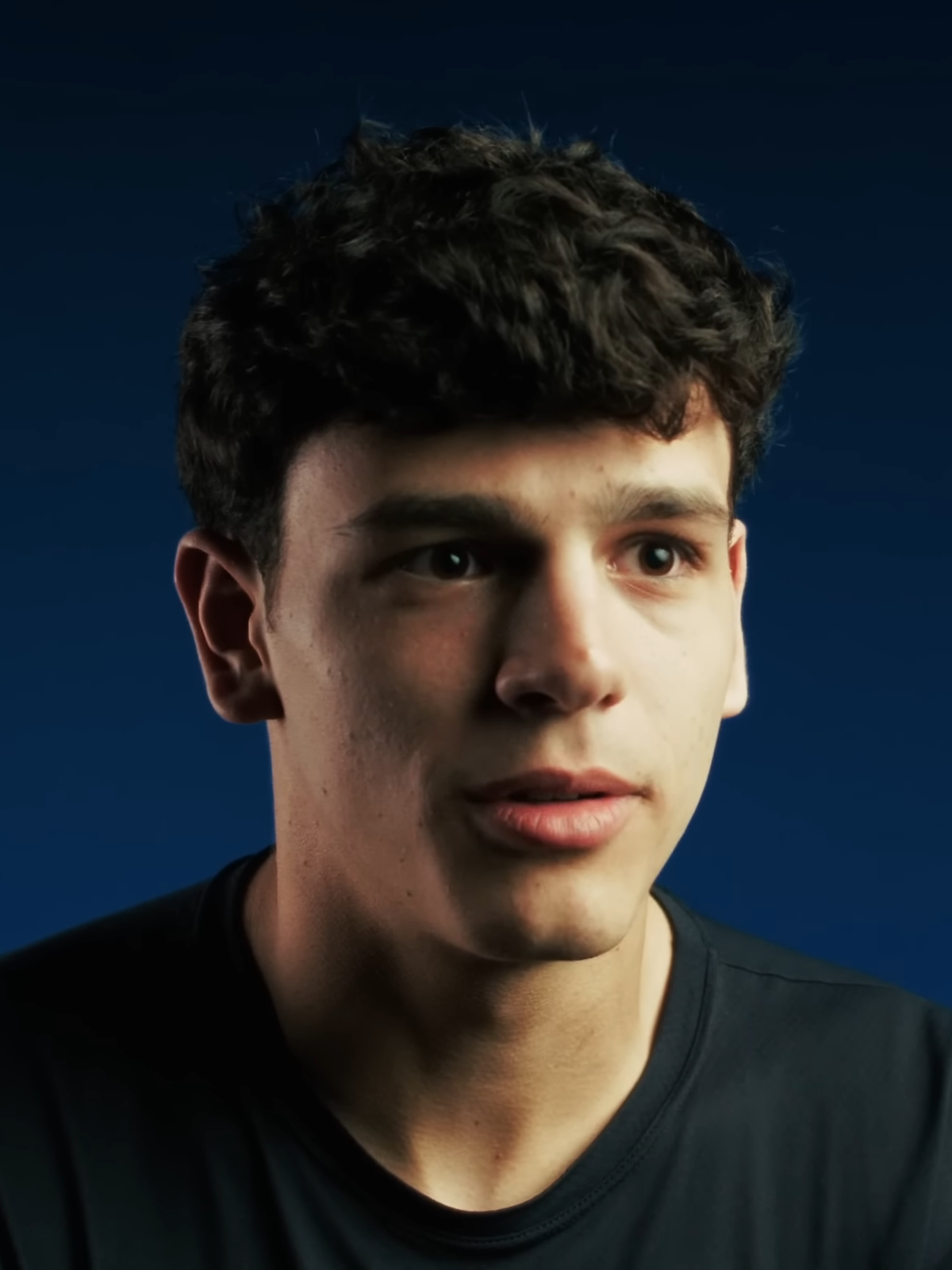
- Bedani in 2025
- Nationality: Brazilian
- Born: 30 January 2008 (age 18) São Paulo, São Paulo, Brazil

Stock Light
- Years active: 2023–2026
- Teams: W2 Pro Racing
- Starts: 52
- Wins: 8
- Podiums: 20
- Poles: 4
- Fastest laps: 8
- Best finish: 2nd in 2024

Championship titles
- 2022: Formula Delta-Copa Brasil

Enzo Garcia Bedani (born 30 January 2008 in São Paulo) is a racing driver from Brazil. Bedani is the 2022 Formula Delta champion and runner-up of the 2024 Stock Series championship. Currently he races in Stock Light for SG28 Racing.

== Career ==
=== Karting ===
Enzo Garcia Bedani began his career in karting at the age of eight, competing in Brazilian and international championships. He had a standout season in 2011, when he won the Open and finished third in the Brazilian Karting Championship, in addition to finishing as runner-up in the South Brazilian Karting Championship. In early 2017, during the Copa São Paulo KGV in the Rotax Micro Max category, Bedani was involved in an accident and suffered a spinal injury that temporarily sidelined him from racing. He returned to competition months later, finishing third in the Brazilian Rotax Championship.

Bedani was also a two-time São Paulo state champion and won the 2021 Copa Brasil de Kart in the OK Junior class, while also competing in Europe and the United States. In 2022, he won a round of the Copa São Paulo Light de Kart in the Junior class.

=== Formula Delta ===
Bedani competed in Formula Delta, a single seater junior racing in Brazil in 2022, there he achieved 6 wins and 11 podiums in 22 races. He ended the year with an 3rd place and being champion of Copa Brasil with 3 wins in 6 rounds.

=== Stock Series/Stock Light ===
In 2023 Bedani moved to Stock Series with W2 ProGP, in his first year he won once being the younger driver to win in Stock Series with fifteen years old, and had three podiums finishing with an 7th place. For 2023 he ended as runner-up with four wins and ten podiums after an battle with Arthur Gama until the last round.

For the 2025 he kept with W2 ProGP for the 2025 Stock Light season. At the opening round, Bedani started from pole position and took victory after leading all 16 laps of the race held at Interlagos. He finished second in race two and won again at third race, reaching a triple podium in all races of the event.

He claimed another back-to-back victory at Race 1 of third round, in Velo Città, leading the championship for much of the season. As one of the main contenders for the title, Bedani rivaling his teammates Alfredinho Ibiapina and Léo Reis, as well as Guto Rotta of Garra Racing and Felipe Barrichello Bartz of SG28 Racing. In the final round, Bedani was leading the championship with a two-point advantage over Bartz. But Bedani finished outside the top ten in all three races, losing the title to Bartz. Bedani reached four pole positions, seven podiums, including three victories, and 297 points, finishing third in the championship, seventeen points behind runner-up Reis and forty-seven points behind champion Bartz.

For the 2026 season he switched to SG28 Racing.

== Racing Record ==
Season	Series	Team	Races	Wins	Poles	F. Laps	Podiums	Points	Position
2022	Formula Delta – Campeonato Paulista		16	3	2	4	8	162	3rd
2022	Formula Delta – Copa Brasil		6	3	0	2	3	100	1st
2023	Stock Series	W2 ProGP	16	1	0	1	3	215	7th
2024	Stock Series	W2 ProGP	18	4	2	5	10	354	2nd
2025	Stock Light	W2 ProGP	18	3	4	2	7	297	3rd
2026	Stock Light	SG28 Racing	0	0	0	0	0	0*	TBA*

Note: * Season still in progress
