= 2023 Stock Series =

Season of touring car racing

The 2023 Stock Series was the 30th season of Stock Series. The season started at the Autódromo José Carlos Pace on April 22. The final race of the season was held at the same circuit on December 17. The championship was won by Zezinho Muggiati.

== Teams and drivers ==
- All cars were powered by V8 engines and used the JL chassis.

Team	No.	Driver	Rounds
Garra Racing	9	(Brazil) Arthur Gama	1–5
Garra Racing	35	(Brazil) Gabriel Robe	1–5
Garra Racing	97	(Brazil) Bruna Tomaselli	1–5
W2 ProGP	16	(Brazil) Mathias de Valle	1–5
W2 ProGP	24	(Brazil) Felipe Barrichello Bartz	1–5
W2 ProGP	38	(Brazil) Zezinho Muggiati	1–5
W2 ProGP	92	(Brazil) Hugo Cibien	1–5
W2 ProGP	98	(Brazil) Enzo Bedani	1–5
RKL Competições	17	(Brazil) Pietro Rimbano	1–4
L3 Motorsport	19	(Brazil) Felipe Papazissis	1–5
RTR Sports	25	(Brazil) Kaka Magno	1–4
RTR Sports	218	(Brazil) Vinicius Papareli	1–5

== Schedule ==
The schedule for 2023 was released on 20 December 2022. On 14 April 2023, the rounds and tracks were confirmed and the official calendar was released

Round		Circuit	Date	Pole position	Fastest lap	Winning driver	Winning team
1	R1	(São Paulo (state)) Autódromo José Carlos Pace; São Paulo, São Paulo	23 April	(Brazil) Zezinho Muggiati	(Brazil) Zezinho Muggiati	(Brazil) Zezinho Muggiati	W2 ProGP
1	R2	(São Paulo (state)) Autódromo José Carlos Pace; São Paulo, São Paulo	23 April	(Brazil) Zezinho Muggiati	(Brazil) Zezinho Muggiati	(Brazil) Zezinho Muggiati	W2 ProGP
1	R3	(São Paulo (state)) Autódromo José Carlos Pace; São Paulo, São Paulo	23 April	—N/a	(Brazil) Zezinho Muggiati	(Brazil) Zezinho Muggiati	W2 ProGP
2	R1	Autódromo Internacional de Tarumã; Viamão, Rio Grande do Sul	21 May	(Brazil) Gabriel Robe	(Brazil) Arthur Gama	(Brazil) Gabriel Robe	Garra Racing
2	R2	Autódromo Internacional de Tarumã; Viamão, Rio Grande do Sul	21 May	(Brazil) Gabriel Robe	(Brazil) Zezinho Muggiati	(Brazil) Gabriel Robe	Garra Racing
2	R3	Autódromo Internacional de Tarumã; Viamão, Rio Grande do Sul	21 May	—N/a	(Brazil) Mathias de Valle	(Brazil) Mathias de Valle	W2 ProGP
3	R1	(Paraná (state)) Autódromo Internacional de Cascavel; Cascavel, Paraná	18 June	(Brazil) Pietro Rimbano	(Brazil) Gabriel Robe	(Brazil) Pietro Rimbano	RKL Competições
3	R2	(Paraná (state)) Autódromo Internacional de Cascavel; Cascavel, Paraná	18 June	(Brazil) Gabriel Robe	(Brazil) Pietro Rimbano	(Brazil) Gabriel Robe	Garra Racing
3	R3	(Paraná (state)) Autódromo Internacional de Cascavel; Cascavel, Paraná	18 June	—N/a	(Brazil) Zezinho Muggiati	(Brazil) Mathias de Valle	W2 ProGP
4	R1	Velopark Nova Santa Rita, Rio Grande do Sul	17 September				
4	R2	Velopark Nova Santa Rita, Rio Grande do Sul	17 September				
4	R3	Velopark Nova Santa Rita, Rio Grande do Sul	17 September	—N/a			
5	R1	(São Paulo (state)) Autódromo Velo Città; Mogi Guaçu, São Paulo	29 October				
5	R2	(São Paulo (state)) Autódromo Velo Città; Mogi Guaçu, São Paulo	29 October				
5	R3	(São Paulo (state)) Autódromo Velo Città; Mogi Guaçu, São Paulo	29 October	—N/a			
6	R1	(São Paulo (state)) Autódromo José Carlos Pace; São Paulo, São Paulo	17 December				
6	R2	(São Paulo (state)) Autódromo José Carlos Pace; São Paulo, São Paulo	17 December				
6	R3	(São Paulo (state)) Autódromo José Carlos Pace; São Paulo, São Paulo	17 December	—N/a			

== Championship standings ==
Points system

Points are awarded for each race at an event to the driver/s of a car that completed at least 75% of the race distance and was running at the completion of the race. Before the last round, the four worst results are discarded. Races in which a driver has been disqualified cannot be discarded. The third race of each event is held with partially reversed top eight grid.

Points format	Position																			
Points format	1st	2nd	3rd	4th	5th	6th	7th	8th	9th	10th	11th	12th	13th	14th	15th	16th	17th	18th	19th	20th
Race 1 and 2	30	26	22	19	17	15	14	13	12	11	10	9	8	7	6	5	4	3	2	1
Race 3	24	20	18	17	16	15	14	13	12	11	10	9	8	7	6	5	4	3	2	1

Drivers' Championship

Pos	Driver	(São Paulo (state)) INT1			(Rio Grande do Sul) TAR			(Paraná (state)) CAS			(Rio Grande do Sul) VLP			(São Paulo (state)) MOG			(São Paulo (state)) INT2			Pts
Pos	Driver	RC1	RC2	RC3	RC1	RC2	RC3	RC1	RC2	RC3	RC1	RC2	RC3	RC1	RC2	RC3	RC1	RC2	RC3	Pts
1	(Brazil) Zezinho Muggiati	**1**	**1**	1	4	2	9	3	3	3	1	1	9	1	2	2	1	3	11	384
2	(Brazil) Gabriel Robe	4	4	4	**1**	**1**	2	2	**1**	4	2	3	Ret	2	1	4	5	2	6	374
3	(Brazil) Arthur Gama	3	3	3	2	7	4	6	7	5	11	6	2	3	3	1	10	4	1	306
4	(Brazil) Felipe Barrichello Bartz	5	Ret	8	6	5	7	5	6	2	3	2	3	4	4	3	3	6	Ret	274
5	(Brazil) Mathias de Valle	Ret	5	9	5	3	1	4	4	1	5	4	Ret	7	6	Ret	6	9	10	262
6	(Brazil) Pietro Rimbano	2	2	2	3	DSQ	DSQ	**1**	2	Ret	8	14	4							218
7	(Brazil) Enzo Bedani	7	9	5	Ret	Ret	DNS	9	9	6	13	5	Ret	5	DSQ	6	2	1	3	215
8	(Brazil) Bruna Tomaselli	6	Ret	6	9	Ret	6	7	5	8	9	7	5	6	Ret	DNS	11	12	4	202
9	(Brazil) Hugo Cibien	8	7	11	10	6	10	8	11	7	10	11	7	8	7	7	9	Ret	9	199
10	(Brazil) Felipe Papazissis	9	Ret	Ret	8	Ret	3	11	10	11	6	10	1	10	Ret	9	8	7	8	197
11	(Brazil) Kaka Magno	10	8	7	11	8	8	10	12	10	12	13	10				12	11	12	174
12	(Brazil) Vinicius Papareli	11	6	10	7	4	5	Ret	8	9	Ret	DSQ	DNS	9	5	5	Ret	Ret	2	173
Pos	Driver	(São Paulo (state)) INT1			(Rio Grande do Sul) TAR			(Paraná (state)) CAS			(Rio Grande do Sul) VLP			(São Paulo (state)) MOG			(São Paulo (state)) INT2			Pts

Colour	Result
Gold	Winner
Silver	Second place
Bronze	Third place
Green	Points classification
Blue	Non-points classification
Blue	Non-classified finish (NC)
Purple	Retired, not classified (Ret)
Red	Did not qualify (DNQ)
Red	Did not pre-qualify (DNPQ)
Black	Disqualified (DSQ)
White	Did not start (DNS)
White	Withdrew (WD)
White	Race cancelled (C)
Blank	Did not practice (DNP)
Blank	Did not arrive (DNA)
Blank	Excluded (EX)

**Bold** – Pole position
Italics – Fastest lap
† – Retired, but classified

== See also ==
- 2023 Stock Car Pro Series
- 2023 Turismo Nacional BR
- 2023 F4 Brazilian Championship
