= 2024 Stock Series =

The 2024 Stock Series was the 31st season of Stock Series, the feeder series to the Stock Car Pro Series.

== Calendar ==
Round	Circuit	Date	Map
1	(São Paulo (state)) Autódromo José Carlos Pace, São Paulo	April 21	2024 Stock Series is located in Brazil
2	(Paraná (state)) Autódromo Internacional de Cascavel, Cascavel	May 19	2024 Stock Series is located in Brazil
3	(São Paulo (state)) Autódromo Velo Città, Mogi Guaçu	June 30	2024 Stock Series is located in Brazil
4	(Goiás) Autódromo Internacional Ayrton Senna, Goiânia	July 28	2024 Stock Series is located in Brazil
5	(Rio Grande do Sul) Velopark, Nova Santa Rita	September 8	2024 Stock Series is located in Brazil
6	(São Paulo (state)) Autódromo José Carlos Pace, São Paulo	December 15	2024 Stock Series is located in Brazil

== Entry list ==
All cars are powered by V8 engines and use the JL chassis.

Team	No.	Driver	Status	Rounds
Artcon Racing	86	(Brazil) Gustavo Frigotto		All
Artcon Racing	9	(Brazil) Arthur Gama		All
Garra Racing	18	(Brazil) Akyu Myasava	R	All
Garra Racing	32	(Brazil) Léo Reis		6
Garra Racing	29	(Brazil) Guto Rotta	R	All
Garra Racing	7	(Brazil) Bruna Tomaselli	F	1-5
W2 ProGP	16	(Brazil) Mathias de Valle		All
W2 ProGP	24	(Brazil) Felipe Barrichello Bartz		All
W2 ProGP	92	(Brazil) Hugo Cibien		All
W2 ProGP	98	(Brazil) Enzo Bedani		All
W2 ProGP	8	(Brazil) Alfredinho Ibiapina	R	All
W2 ProGP	77	(Brazil) Erick Schotten	R	All
RTR Sport Team	218	(Brazil) Vinícius Papareli		All
RTR Sport Team	25	(Brazil) Kaká Magno	F	All

Icon	Status
R	Rookie
F	Female

== Schedule ==
The schedule for 2024 was released on 20 December 2023. On 14 April 2023, the rounds and tracks were confirmed and the official calendar was released

Round		Circuit	Date	Pole position	Fastest lap	Winning driver	Winning team
1	R1	(São Paulo (state)) Autódromo José Carlos Pace; São Paulo, São Paulo	April 21	(Brazil) Arthur Gama	(Brazil) Arthur Gama	(Brazil) Arthur Gama	(Brazil) Artcon Racing
1	R2	(São Paulo (state)) Autódromo José Carlos Pace; São Paulo, São Paulo	April 21	(Brazil) Arthur Gama	(Brazil) Felipe Barrichello Bartz	(Brazil) Arthur Gama	(Brazil) Artcon Racing
1	R3	(São Paulo (state)) Autódromo José Carlos Pace; São Paulo, São Paulo	April 21	—N/a	(Brazil) Felipe Barrichello Bartz	(Brazil) Felipe Barrichello Bartz	(Brazil) W2 ProGP
2	R1	(Paraná (state)) Autódromo Internacional de Cascavel; Cascavel, Paraná	May 19	(Brazil) Enzo Bedani	(Brazil) Gustavo Frigotto	(Brazil) Enzo Bedani	(Brazil) W2 ProGP
2	R2	(Paraná (state)) Autódromo Internacional de Cascavel; Cascavel, Paraná	May 19	(Brazil) Arthur Gama	(Brazil) Arthur Gama	(Brazil) Arthur Gama	(Brazil) Artcon Racing
2	R3	(Paraná (state)) Autódromo Internacional de Cascavel; Cascavel, Paraná	May 19	—N/a	(Brazil) Enzo Bedani	(Brazil) Alfredinho Ibiapina	(Brazil) W2 ProGP
3	R1	(São Paulo (state)) Autódromo Velo Città; Mogi Guaçu, São Paulo	June 30	(Brazil) Arthur Gama	(Brazil) Arthur Gama	(Brazil) Arthur Gama	(Brazil) Artcon Racing
3	R2	(São Paulo (state)) Autódromo Velo Città; Mogi Guaçu, São Paulo	June 30	(Brazil) Enzo Bedani	(Brazil) Bruna Tomaselli	(Brazil) Enzo Bedani	(Brazil) W2 ProGP
3	R3	(São Paulo (state)) Autódromo Velo Città; Mogi Guaçu, São Paulo	June 30	—N/a	(Brazil) Felipe Barrichello Bartz	(Brazil) Erick Schotten	(Brazil) W2 ProGP
4	R1	Autódromo Internacional Ayrton Senna; Goiânia, Goiás	July 28	(Brazil) Vinicius Paparelli	(Brazil) Enzo Bedani	(Brazil) Enzo Bedani	(Brazil) W2 ProGP
4	R2	Autódromo Internacional Ayrton Senna; Goiânia, Goiás	July 28	(Brazil) Arthur Gama	(Brazil) Arthur Gama	(Brazil) Arthur Gama	(Brazil) Artcon Racing
4	R3	Autódromo Internacional Ayrton Senna; Goiânia, Goiás	July 28	—N/a	(Brazil) Enzo Bedani	(Brazil) Enzo Bedani	(Brazil) W2 ProGP
5	R1	Velopark Nova Santa Rita, Rio Grande do Sul	September 8	(Brazil) Enzo Bedani	(Brazil) Mathias de Valle	(Brazil) Arthur Gama	(Brazil) Artcon Racing
5	R2	Velopark Nova Santa Rita, Rio Grande do Sul	September 8	(Brazil) Arthur Gama	(Brazil) Enzo Bedani	(Brazil) Arthur Gama	(Brazil) Artcon Racing
5	R3	Velopark Nova Santa Rita, Rio Grande do Sul	September 8	—N/a	(Brazil) Arthur Gama	(Brazil) Erick Schotten	(Brazil) W2 ProGP
6	R1	(São Paulo (state)) Autódromo José Carlos Pace; São Paulo, São Paulo	December 15	(Brazil) Arthur Gama	(Brazil) Felipe Barrichello Bartz	(Brazil) Arthur Gama	(Brazil) Artcon Racing
6	R2	(São Paulo (state)) Autódromo José Carlos Pace; São Paulo, São Paulo	December 15	(Brazil) Arthur Gama	(Brazil) Guto Rotta	(Brazil) Felipe Barrichello Bartz	(Brazil) W2 ProGP
6	R3	(São Paulo (state)) Autódromo José Carlos Pace; São Paulo, São Paulo	December 15	—N/a	(Brazil) Arthur Gama	(Brazil) Arthur Gama	(Brazil) Artcon Racing

== Championship standings ==
Points system

Points are awarded for each race at an event to the driver/s of a car that completed at least 75% of the race distance and was running at the completion of the race. Before the last round, the four worst results are discarded. Races in which a driver has been disqualified cannot be discarded. The third race of each event is held with partially reversed top eight grid.

Points format	Position																			
Points format	1st	2nd	3rd	4th	5th	6th	7th	8th	9th	10th	11th	12th	13th	14th	15th	16th	17th	18th	19th	20th
Race 1 and 2	30	26	22	19	17	15	14	13	12	11	10	9	8	7	6	5	4	3	2	1
Race 3	24	20	18	17	16	15	14	13	12	11	10	9	8	7	6	5	4	3	2	1

Drivers' Championship

Pos	Driver	(São Paulo (state)) INT1			(Paraná (state)) CAS			(São Paulo (state)) MOG			(Goiás) GOI			(Rio Grande do Sul) VEL			(São Paulo (state)) INT2			Pts
Pos	Driver	RC1	RC2	RC3	RC1	RC2	RC3	RC1	RC2	RC3	RC1	RC2	RC3	RC1	RC2	RC3	RC1	RC2	RC3	Pts
1	(Brazil) Arthur Gama	**1**	**1**	3	2	1	2	1	3	Ret	5	1	4	1	1	2	1	2	1	415
2	(Brazil) Enzo Bedani	2	4	7	1	2	4	2	1	10	1	7	1	7	2	3	6	8	2	354
3	(Brazil) Gustavo Frigotto	5	3	4	3	4	11	3	9	2	3	6	2	4	8	8	5	9	5	295
4	(Brazil) Felipe Barrichello Bartz	3	2	1	Ret	14	Ret	5	5	3	6	5	Ret	9	3	5	2	1	10	285
5	(Brazil) Guto Rotta	4	10	5	Ret	5	6	7	4	6	14	4	9	5	6	4	3	4	3	270
6	(Brazil) Alfredinho Ibiapina	6	6	8	5	7	1	9	7	9	10	Ret	10	13	5	6	8	3	6	244
7	(Brazil) Erick Schotten	7	5	9	7	8	Ret	8	12	1	9	8	6	6	7	1	12	12	DNS	226
8	(Brazil) Vinicius Papareli	Ret	7	10	9	3	DNS	Ret	2	11	2	2	3	3	DSQ	DSQ	Ret	Ret	Ret	206
9	(Brazil) Mathias de Valle	11	8	2	8	13	7	4	6	12	4	3	5	12	4	Ret	14	DNS	DNS	205
10	(Brazil) Bruna Tomaselli	Ret	9	6	4	6	3	6	8	4	7	9	8	8	9	7				204
11	(Brazil) Hugo Cibien	9	Ret	Ret	6	9	9	10	10	7	12	10	11	11	10	9	9	Ret	7	181
12	(Brazil) Kaka Magno	10	11	11	10	15	8	13	13	13	13	11	7	10	11	10	13	Ret	DNS	149
13	(Brazil) Akyu Myasava	8	Ret	DNS	Ret	12	Ret	12	11	8	11	12	Ret	Ret	12	11	11	5	9	140
14	(Brazil) Léo Reis																6	8	DNS	28
Pos	Driver	(São Paulo (state)) INT1			(Paraná (state)) CAS			(São Paulo (state)) MOG			(Goiás) GOI			(Rio Grande do Sul) VEL			(São Paulo (state)) INT2			Pts

Colour	Result
Gold	Winner
Silver	Second place
Bronze	Third place
Green	Points classification
Blue	Non-points classification
Blue	Non-classified finish (NC)
Purple	Retired, not classified (Ret)
Red	Did not qualify (DNQ)
Red	Did not pre-qualify (DNPQ)
Black	Disqualified (DSQ)
White	Did not start (DNS)
White	Withdrew (WD)
White	Race cancelled (C)
Blank	Did not practice (DNP)
Blank	Did not arrive (DNA)
Blank	Excluded (EX)

**Bold** – Pole position
Italics – Fastest lap
† – Retired, but classified
