= 2025 Stock Light =

Car racing competition

The 2025 Stock Light was the 32nd season of Stock Light, the feeder series to the Stock Car Pro Series. In 2025 the series was rebranded back to Stock Light after three years under the Stock Series name, after complains about the name similarities between the main series Stock Car Pro Series.

== Calendar ==
The calendar for the 2025 season was revealed in January 16 of 2025 with the first round expected to be in Autódromo Internacional de Cascavel in Cascavel on March 23. Due the high number of entries a new schedule was released on February 28 to make sure teams would have time to prepare the additional cars. With that the first round was moved to Interlagos Circuit in São Paulo on May 3. On 13 June, the first Velo Città round was postponed to at the end of September, however this round was later shifted to July.

It consisted of 6 rounds with three races each, making 18 races in total.

Round	Circuit (Event)	Dates	Map
1	(São Paulo (state)) Autódromo José Carlos Pace; São Paulo, São Paulo	3–4 May	2025 Stock Light is located in Brazil
2	Velopark; Nova Santa Rita, Rio Grande do Sul	7–8 June	2025 Stock Light is located in Brazil
3	(São Paulo (state)) Autódromo Velo Città; Mogi Guaçu, São Paulo	19–20 July	2025 Stock Light is located in Brazil
4	(Paraná (state)) Autódromo Internacional de Cascavel; Cascavel, Paraná	6–7 September	2025 Stock Light is located in Brazil
5	(São Paulo (state)) Autódromo Velo Città; Mogi Guaçu, São Paulo	27–28 September	2025 Stock Light is located in Brazil
6	(Federal District (Brazil)) Autódromo Internacional de Brasília; Brasília, Distrito Federal	29–30 November	2025 Stock Light is located in Brazil

== Entry list ==
All cars are powered by V8 engines and use the JL chassis.

Team	No.	Driver	Status	Rounds
Artcon Racing	16	(Brazil) Mathias de Valle		All
Artcon Racing	23	(Brazil) Lucas Zucchini	R	All
SG28 Racing	17	(Brazil) Juninho Berlanda	R	All
SG28 Racing	24	(Brazil) Felipe Barrichello Bartz		All
SG28 Racing	97	(Brazil) Bruna Tomaselli	F	All
Garra Racing	18	(Brazil) Akyu Myasava		All
Garra Racing	29	(Brazil) Guto Rotta		All
Garra Racing	63	(Brazil) Luís Trombini	R	All
Garra Racing	73	(Brazil) Gustavo Teixeira	R	6
W2 ProGP	7	(Brazil) Gabriel Koeniggan	R	All
W2 ProGP	8	(Brazil) Alfredinho Ibiapina		All
W2 ProGP	19	(Brazil) Enzo Gianfratti	R	All
W2 ProGP	77	(Brazil) Erick Schotten		All
W2 ProGP	98	(Brazil) Enzo Bedani		All
W2 ProGP	293	(Brazil) Léo Reis		All
MKT Racing Team	107	(Brazil) Ernani Kuhn		All
MF Force	21	(Brazil) Rafael Martins		1–3, 5–6
MF Force	34	(Brazil) Will Cesar	R	All
MF Force	80	(Brazil) João Bortoluzzi	R	All
RTR Sport Team	54	(Brazil) Pedro Garcia	R	6
RTR Sport Team	78	(Brazil) Raphael Teixeira	R	6
RTR Sport Team	82	(Brazil) Pedro Garcia	R	All
RTR Sport Team	113	(Brazil) Witold Ramasauskas	R	1–5
RTR Sport Team	218	(Brazil) Vinícius Paparelli		All
Infinity Competições	25	(Brazil) Kaká Magno	F	1–5
Infinity Competições	88	(Brazil) Augusto Sangalli	R	5
Infinity Competições	99	(Brazil) Enzo Falquete	R	1–3

Note:

Icon	Status
R	Rookie
F	Female

== Season summary ==
Round		Circuit	Date	Pole position	Fastest lap	Winning driver	Winning team
1	R1	(São Paulo (state)) Interlagos	3–4 May	(Brazil) Enzo Bedani	(Brazil) Léo Reis	(Brazil) Enzo Bedani	W2 ProGP
1	R2	(São Paulo (state)) Interlagos	3–4 May	(Brazil) Enzo Bedani	(Brazil) Enzo Bedani	(Brazil) Felipe Barrichello Bartz	SG28 Racing
1	R3	(São Paulo (state)) Interlagos	3–4 May		(Brazil) Enzo Bedani	(Brazil) Enzo Bedani	W2 ProGP
2	R1	(Rio Grande do Sul) Velopark	7–8 June	(Brazil) Alfredinho Ibiapina	(Brazil) Alfredinho Ibiapina	(Brazil) Alfredinho Ibiapina	W2 ProGP
2	R2	(Rio Grande do Sul) Velopark	7–8 June	(Brazil) Alfredinho Ibiapina	(Brazil) Alfredinho Ibiapina	(Brazil) Alfredinho Ibiapina	W2 ProGP
2	R3	(Rio Grande do Sul) Velopark	7–8 June		(Brazil) Rafael Martins	(Brazil) Guto Rota	Garra Racing
3	R1	(São Paulo (state)) Velo Città	19–20 July	(Brazil) Enzo Bedani	(Brazil) Felipe Barrichello Bartz	(Brazil) Enzo Bedani	W2 ProGP
3	R2	(São Paulo (state)) Velo Città	19–20 July	(Brazil) Enzo Bedani	(Brazil) Alfredinho Ibiapina	(Brazil) Alfredinho Ibiapina	W2 ProGP
3	R3	(São Paulo (state)) Velo Città	19–20 July		(Brazil) Alfredinho Ibiapina	(Brazil) Juninho Berlanda	SG28 Racing
4	R1	(Paraná (state)) Cascavel	6–7 September	(Brazil) Felipe Barrichello Bartz	(Brazil) Felipe Barrichello Bartz	(Brazil) Felipe Barrichello Bartz	SG28 Racing
4	R2	(Paraná (state)) Cascavel	6–7 September	(Brazil) Felipe Barrichello Bartz	(Brazil) Felipe Barrichello Bartz	(Brazil) Felipe Barrichello Bartz	SG28 Racing
4	R3	(Paraná (state)) Cascavel	6–7 September		(Brazil) Ernani Kuhn	(Brazil) Mathias de Valle	Artcon Racing
5	R2	(São Paulo (state)) Velo Città	27–28 September	(Brazil) Rafael Martins	(Brazil) Rafael Martins	(Brazil) Rafael Martins	MF Force
5	R1	(São Paulo (state)) Velo Città	27–28 September	(Brazil) Gabriel Koeniggan	(Brazil) Rafael Martins	(Brazil) Gabriel Koeniggan	W2 ProGP
5	R3	(São Paulo (state)) Velo Città	27–28 September		(Brazil) Juninho Berlanda	(Brazil) Guto Rocha	Garra Racing
6	R1	(Federal District (Brazil)) Brasília	29–30 November	(Brazil) Léo Reis	(Brazil) Léo Reis	(Brazil) Rafael Martins	MF Force
6	R2	(Federal District (Brazil)) Brasília	29–30 November	(Brazil) Léo Reis	(Brazil) Léo Reis	(Brazil) Léo Reis	W2 ProGP
6	R3	(Federal District (Brazil)) Brasília	29–30 November		(Brazil) Rafael Martins	(Brazil) Léo Reis	W2 ProGP

== Championship standings ==
Points system

Points are awarded for each race at an event to the driver/s of a car that completed at least 75% of the race distance and was running at the completion of the race. The two worst results are discarded. Races in which a driver has been disqualified cannot be discarded. The third race of each event is held with partially reversed top eight grid.

Points format	Position																			
Points format	1st	2nd	3rd	4th	5th	6th	7th	8th	9th	10th	11th	12th	13th	14th	15th	16th	17th	18th	19th	20th
Race 1 and 2	30	26	22	19	17	15	14	13	12	11	10	9	8	7	6	5	4	3	2	1
Race 3	24	20	18	17	16	15	14	13	12	11	10	9	8	7	6	5	4	3	2	1

Drivers' Championship (Note: Points total shown excluding the 2 lowest scores before the final round, which are dropped.)

Pos	Driver	(São Paulo (state)) INT			(Rio Grande do Sul) VEL			(São Paulo (state)) MOG1			(Paraná (state)) CAS			(São Paulo (state)) MOG2			(Federal District (Brazil)) BRA			Pts
Pos	Driver	R1	R2	R3	R1	R2	R3	R1	R2	R3	R1	R2	R3	R1	R2	R3	R1	R2	R3	Pts
1	(Brazil) Felipe Barrichello Bartz	3	1	Ret	2	4	10	2	4	3	1	1	2	Ret	3	4	3	3	2	343
2	(Brazil) Léo Reis	2	11	3	3	6	9	6	2	4	2	5	14	4	10	Ret	2	1	1	314
3	(Brazil) Enzo Bedani	1	2	1	5	5	4	1	3	7	5	6	3	2	7	Ret	12	18	14	297
4	(Brazil) Alfredinho Ibiapina	7	15	DNS	1	1	Ret	14	1	10	4	9	6	5	6	9	14	4	13	252
5	(Brazil) Guto Rota	4	4	13	Ret	8	1	10	7	2	16	3	DSQ	6	8	1	4	19	9	236
6	(Brazil) Rafael Martins	Ret	3	4	Ret	3	7	3	Ret	DNS				1	2	2	1	2	18	232
7	(Brazil) Mathias de Valle	6	17	DNS	4	2	2	8	19	Ret	11	4	1	Ret	5	11	Ret	7	Ret	193
8	(Brazil) Erick Schotten	9	Ret	DNS	Ret	7	11	11	5	9	9	13	5	13	12	3	6	10	5	188
9	(Brazil) Bruna Tomaselli	5	13	5	6	13	3	Ret	14	8	6	10	7	12	18	Ret	7	15	11	184
10	(Brazil) Ernani Kuhn	14	6	12	8	Ret	DNS	4	10	Ret	3	2	4	7	14	Ret	Ret	13	7	182
11	(Brazil) Juninho Berlanda	13	7	9	11	Ret	DNS	12	8	1	7	7	8	Ret	11	12	Ret	9	8	175
12	(Brazil) Gabriel Koenigkan	10	Ret	DNS	Ret	14	Ret	5	7	12	DNS	14	Ret	3	1	Ret	5	6	3	168
13	(Brazil) Enzo Giafratti	18	5	6	7	12	8	9	9	6	8	12	Ret	Ret	15	8	Ret	Ret	Ret	150
14	(Brazil) João Bortoluzzi	11	8	2	10	DSQ	DSQ	Ret	11	15	Ret	18	Ret	8	9	5	Ret	14	4	138
15	(Brazil) Akyu Myasava	17	18	8	Ret	11	5	17	16	11	17	Ret	12	9	Ret	7	11	12	15	130
16	(Brazil) Pedro Garcia	12	14	14	9	9	12	7	20	13	DSQ	8	Ret	Ret	19	Ret	8	8	17	125
17	(Brazil) Luis Trombini	15	9	7	12	15	DNS	16	17	DSQ	10	11	11	14	13	6	9	17	10	124
18	(Brazil) Will Cesar	Ret	19	10	15	Ret	DNS	18	13	14	14	15	9	10	17	13	Ret	16	12	99
19	(Brazil) Kaká Magno	19	12	11	16	16	6	Ret	21	DNS	12	16	13	11	DSQ	10				90
20	(Brazil) Vinícius Papareli	8	Ret	DNS	14	Ret	DNS	Ret	18	Ret	15	Ret	DNS	Ret	4	Ret	10	5	Ret	76
21	(Brazil) Luca Zucchini	16	16	DNS	17	10	Ret	13	15	5	DSQ	19	10							64
22	(Brazil) Witold Ramasauskas	Ret	10	Ret	Ret	DSQ	DNS	15	12	16	13	17	DNS	16	16	Ret				53
23	(Brazil) Raphael Teixeira																Ret	11	5	26
24	(Brazil) Enzo Falquete	Ret	Ret	DNS	12	Ret	DNS	Ret	Ret	DNS										9
25	(Brazil) Pedro Caland																13	20	Ret	9
26	(Brazil) Gustavo Teixeira																Ret	Ret	16	5
27	(Brazil) Augusto Sangalli													Ret	Ret	Ret				0
