= 2026 NASCAR Brasil Series =

Brazilian auto racing season

The 2026 NASCAR Brasil Series is the fourth season of the NASCAR Brasil Series after the rebrand of "Sprint Race" Series. It consists of nine rounds plus an pre-season round starting on 15 March in Pirelli Brazilian testing facility Circuito Panamericano, Elias Fausto and will finish on 29 November in Autódromo Internacional de Brasília, Brasília. It is the first season of the series new car called "RISE 26" which features a new chassis, an upgrade of 60 hp (45 kW) on its V6 engine and 40 kg (88 lb) lighter than the previous generation.

For the 2026 season, several changes are being implanted in the series; a Playoff system is coming to replace the old "Special Edition" rounds, as well a pre-season round inspired by the NASCAR "Cook Out Clash" called "O duelo" (The Duel) with a special racing format unseen in the series before.

Rubens Barrichello entered the season as both 2025 "Overall" and "Brazilian" championships Champion, while Gabriel Casagrande entered the season as the "Special Edition" Champion.

== Technical changes and Playoffs System ==
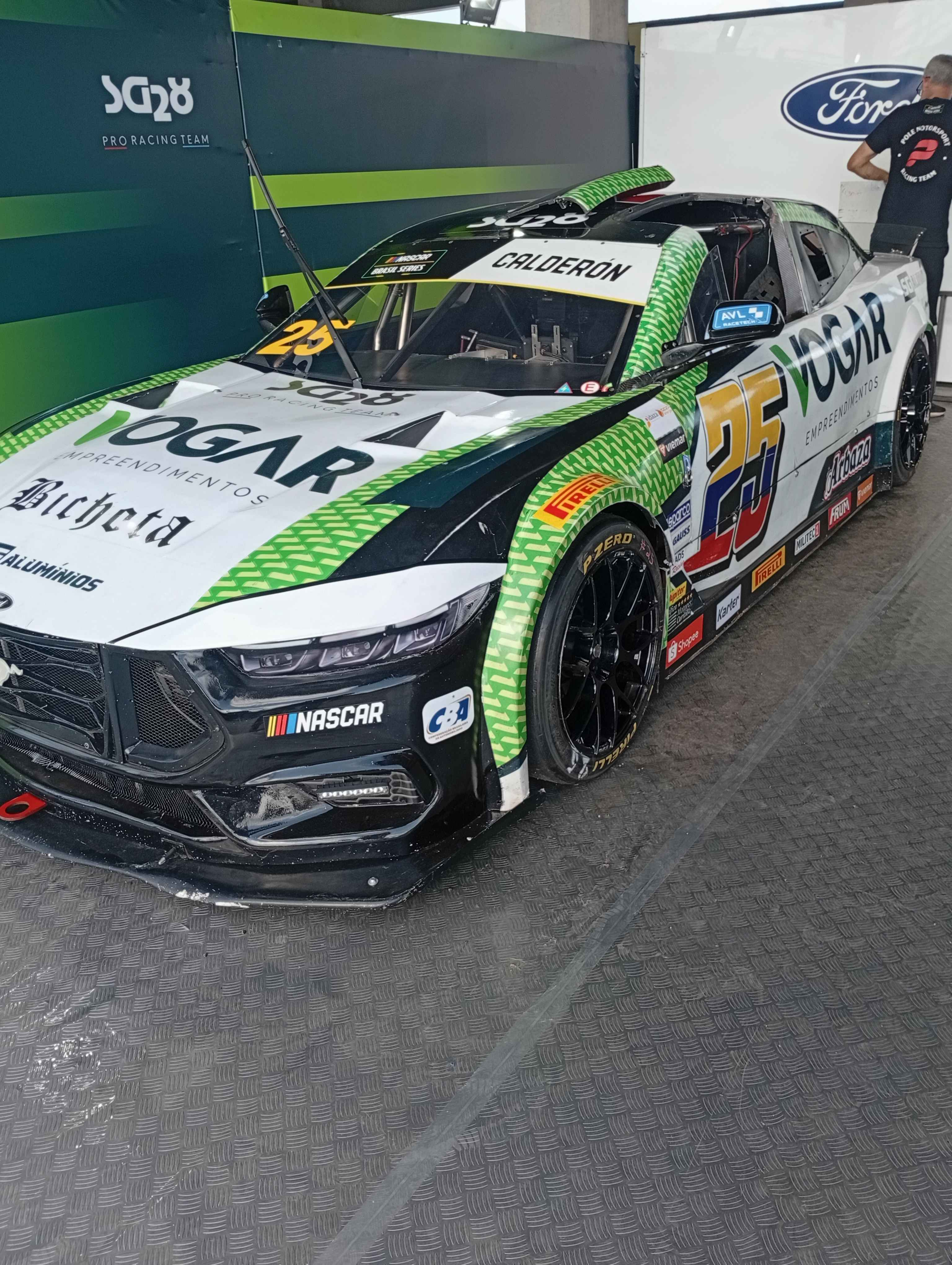
Tatiana Calderón RISE26 Ford Mustang at Cuiabá

Technical changes:

The 2026 season will debut a new car for the series, named "RISE 26" (Racecraft”, “Innovation”, “Safety” and “Experience”), it consists in several upgrades and modifications from the previous generation, including the replacement of the butterfly doors for an hatch to driver's entry as well an relocation of drivers position from the middle of the car to the left due facilitate rescue teams operation. As well the car received a new electronic and suspension package, update in chassis for safety reasons, especially in the front and rear bumpers, increase on power-to-weight ratio and fuel tank capacity (fueled by ethanol), car body changing from fiberglass to carbon fiber and a unique Pirelli tire developed specially for the series.

Technical information:

- Architecture: 3-piece modular chassis (front/rear clips + central cell)
- Cell: Polished 304 stainless steel
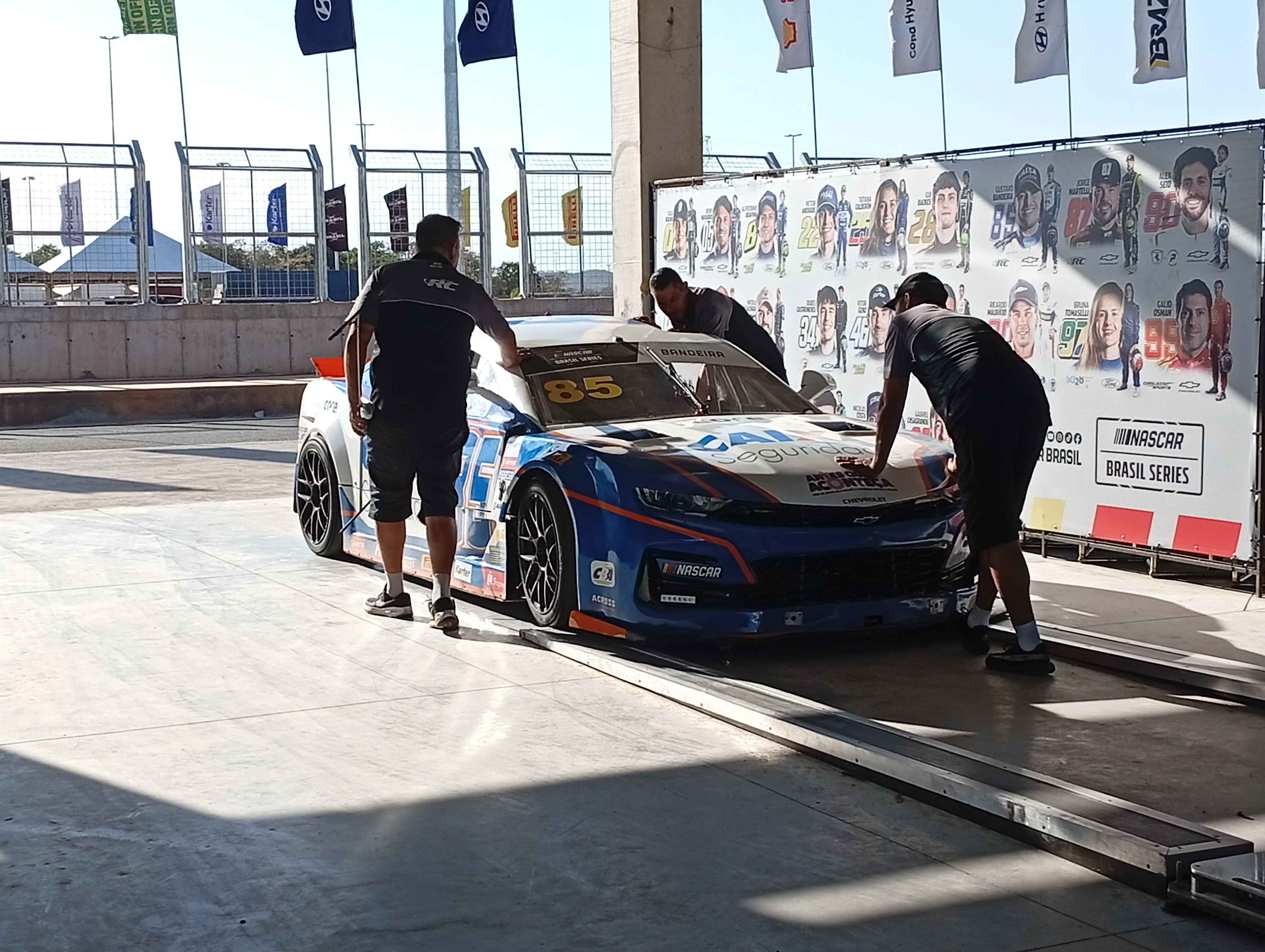
- Gustavo Bandeira RISE26 Chevrolet Camaro at Cuiabá track.
  Body: Carbon fiber; Hexagon dimensional control
- Engine: NB-26 V6, 360 hp
- Fuel: 100% Ethanol
- Transmission: 6-speed, power shift and paddle shifters
- Torque (max.): 55 kgf•m
- Weight: 960 kg
- Power-to-weight ratio: 2.66 kg/hp
- Suspension: Double wishbone
- Wheels: RAW
- Tires: Pirelli TH4, size 265/645R18 PZERO (special NASCAR Brazil compound)
- Steering wheel: TMC, carbon fiber, multifunction
- Fuel tank: Kevlar, 90 L

Playoff format:

The 2026 season saw a change in the championship structure with the addition of "Playoffs" inspired by the Cup Series. On March 20th NASCAR Brasil CEO Thiago Marques announced its rules. The "Playoffs" replaces the old "Special Edition" rounds and encompasses the last two rounds of the championship, with this, the old titles of "Brazil Champion" and "Special Edition Champion" ceases to exist, with only the overall championship remaining, the Playoffs functioning as follows:

- Regular season:

The regular season took place during the first 7 rounds of the championship, with two races in each round, totaling 14 races. During these rounds, qualifying consisted in drivers setting times following a sprint race between the top 5 fastest drivers, awarding 10 points to the winner and 2 points to the 5th-place finisher. After the 20 races and 7 qualifying sprints, the 12 highest-placed drivers received 20 extra points in their score for the next phase of the playoffs.

- Playoffs:

The playoff races have a different scoring system than the rest of the championship and consist of three races in each round, additionally, sprint races during qualifying will no longer take place. After the Chapecó round, the six best-placed drivers will receive 10 extra points in their championship standings totaling a combination of 30 bonus points for the top 6 and 20 bonus points for the top 12 before the final round in Autódromo de Brasília. The champion will be decided by the driver who scores the most points throughout the entire championship.

Race length:

For 2025 season, both races during the regular season were 25m+1lap, from 2026 season the first race of the weekend will have a length of 23m+1lap while the second race will have its duration increased to 30m+1lap.

== Teams and drivers ==
Following 2025 season, when for the first time the cars were run by private teams, the 2026 season will include two new teams on the grid making a total of 5, after R.Mattheis Motorsport left the series being replaced by Pole Motorsport.

NASCAR Brasil 2026 teams and drivers
| Body Style | Team | No | Driver | Rounds |
|---|---|---|---|---|
| Chevrolet Camaro | Team RC | 0 | (Brazil) Cacá Bueno | 1– 8 |
| Chevrolet Camaro | Team RC | 3 | (Brazil) Firás Fahs | 4– 8 |
| Chevrolet Camaro | Team RC | 11 | (Brazil) Witold Ramazauskas | 1– 8 |
| Chevrolet Camaro | Team RC | 27 | (Brazil) Sergio Ramalho | 8 |
| Chevrolet Camaro | Team RC | 57 | (Brazil) Felipe Tozzo | 1– 8 |
| Chevrolet Camaro | Team RC | 85 | (Brazil) Gustavo Bandeira | 1– 7 |
| Chevrolet Camaro | Team RC | 87 | (Brazil) Jorge Martelli | 1– 8 |
| Chevrolet Camaro | Cavaleiro Sports | 5 | (Brazil) Denis Navarro | 1– 8 |
| Chevrolet Camaro | Cavaleiro Sports | 7 | (Brazil) Rafaela Ferreira | 8 |
| Chevrolet Camaro | Cavaleiro Sports | 9 | (Brazil) Arthur Gama | 1– 8 |
| Chevrolet Camaro | Cavaleiro Sports | 10 | (Brazil) Ricardo Zonta | 1– 6 |
| Chevrolet Camaro | Cavaleiro Sports | 19 | (Brazil) Felipe Malinowski | 7 |
| Chevrolet Camaro | Cavaleiro Sports | 99 | (Brazil) Galid Osman | 1– 8 |
| Chevrolet Camaro | Pole Motorsport | 34 | (Brazil) Dudes Castroneves | 1– 8 |
| Chevrolet Camaro | Cavaleiro Sports by Pole Motorsport | 90 | (Brazil) Ricardo Maurício | 1– 4, 6–8 |
| Chevrolet Camaro | Cavaleiro Sports by Pole Motorsport | 90 | (Brazil) Alex Seid | 1, 3– 5 |
| Chevrolet Camaro | AMattheis Vogel | 13 | (Greece) Thomas Krasonis | 8 |
| Chevrolet Camaro | AMattheis Vogel | 69 | (Brazil) Nicolas Costa | 1– 7 |
| Chevrolet Camaro | AMattheis Vogel | 83 | (Brazil) Gabriel Casagrande | 1– 8 |
| Ford Mustang | Full Time Sports | 8 | (Brazil) Alfredinho Ibiapina | 1– 8 |
| Ford Mustang | Full Time Sports | 15 | (Brazil) Tito Giaffone | 1– 8 |
| Ford Mustang | Full Time Sports | 21 | (Brazil) Thiago Camilo | 1– 8 |
| Ford Mustang | Full Time Sports | 22 | (Brazil) Victor Andrade | 1– 6 |
| Ford Mustang | Full Time Sports | 46 | (Brazil) Vitor Genz | 1– 8 |
| Ford Mustang | Full Time Sports | 55 | (Brazil) Murilo Rocha | 1– 8 |
| Ford Mustang | Full Time Sports | 72 | (Brazil) Antonella Bassani | 8 |
| Ford Mustang | SG28 Racing by Pole Motorsport | 26 | (Brazil) Bruna Tomaselli | 1– 8 |
| Ford Mustang | SG28 Racing by Pole Motorsport | 97 | (Colombia) Tatiana Calderón | 1– 8 |
| Ford Mustang | AMattheis Vogel | 17 | (Brazil) Juninho Berlanda | 2– 8 |
| Ford Mustang | AMattheis Vogel | 18 | (Brazil) Allam Khodair | 1 |
| Ford Mustang | AMattheis Vogel | 28 | (Brazil) Gui Backes | 1– 8 |

Note:

Nascar Brasil Championship drivers
Challenge Championship drivers

Team changes

Cavaleiro Sports announced their move to NASCAR Brasil in December 2025, the team was invited to join the grid for the 2025 season, but the management decided to wait for the series new car to be the right moment to join, they will field three cars in the grid.

Pole Motorsport replaced R.Mattheis Motorsport after announcing the entry in NASCAR Brasil in January, being the fifth private team in the grid.

Initially was expected to both Cavaleiro Sports and Pole motorsports operations to run separated, but in some point before the first round in Santa Cruz to Sul, both teams announced a technical partnership creating the "Cavaleiro Sports by Pole Motorsports".

SG28 Racing was expected to run with Bruna Tomaselli and Tatiana Calderón in the Stock Car Pro Series season, but after financial and logistical problems the team decided to move to NASCAR Brasil in a team partnership with Pole Motorsport.

In 2025 A.Mattheis Motorsport had a partnership with Vogel Motorsport creating the MX Vogel team, but in 2026 they took control of the whole operation becoming A.Mattheis Vogel.

Team RC and Full Time Sports will keep with six cars on the grid, while AMattheis Vogel will operate four cars.

Driver changes:

Vitor Genz was announced in Full Time Sports after his previous team left the series while Murilo Rocha will debut with the team after being runner-up in 2025 F4 Brazilian Championship.

Denis Navarro debuted this season with Cavaleiro Sports while Arthur Gama will return to the series with the team after leaving beyond 2023 season.

Dudes Castroneves moved to Pole Motorsport after RMattheis Motorsport left the series.

Ricardo Zonta and Galid Osman both moved to Cavaleiro Sports and run under Shell brand.

Gustavo Bandeira, Denis Navarro, Ricardo Maurício, Bruna Tomaselli, Tatiana Calderón, Murilo Rocha, Allam Khodair and Nicolas Costa will debut in the series this season.

== Schedule ==
The pre-calendar of the 2026 season of NASCAR Brasil series was released on November 17 including 21 races on 9 rounds across Brazil and was set to start on March 15 in a yet to be determined track, with the season closure scheduled to Autódromo Internacional de Brasília in November 29.

On January 24, the calendar received its first update with the addition of a pre-season race to serve as first contact for teams and drivers with the new car. As well, the yet to be determined first round was scheduled to Autódromo Internacional de Santa Cruz do Sul in April 12, and the round in Autódromo Internacional de Chapecó had its dates switched with Autódromo Internacional de Cascavel on May 3 due to track building works delay.

For the first time, the calendar did not have more than one round per track, as well ten dates for the first time. The calendar has a mix of seven road courses, two oval tracks and one external layouts. On June 17, it was announced that the series will go to Autódromo Internacional Ayrton Senna (Londrina) instead of the planned round on Autódromo Internacional Ayrton Senna (Goiânia) due to the reconstruction works in there.

Location of circuits scheduled to host a NASCAR Brasil Series round in 2026

| Round | Track | Event name | Date |
|---|---|---|---|
| NC | (São Paulo (state)) Autódromo Panamericano; São Paulo, Elias Fausto | "O Duelo" | 21–22 March |
| 1 | Autódromo Internacional de Santa Cruz do Sul; Santa Cruz do Sul, Rio Grande do Sul | | 11–12 April |
| 2 | (Paraná (state)) Autódromo Internacional de Cascavel; Paraná, Cascavel | "Sunset" | 2–3 May |
| 3 | (São Paulo (state)) Autódromo José Carlos Pace; São Paulo, São Paulo | "Grand Prix Sonic" | 30–31 May |
| 4 | (São Paulo (state)) Autódromo Velo Città; São Paulo, Mogi Guaçu | | 27–28 June |
| 5 | Autódromo Internacional de Mato Grosso; Cuiabá, Mato Grosso | "Night Challenge" | 1–2 August |
| 6 | (Paraná (state)) Autódromo Internacional Ayrton Senna; Londrina, Paraná | | 22–23 August |
| 7 | Circuito dos Cristais; Minas Gerais, Curvelo | "Oval Track" | 19–20 September |
| 8 | (Santa Catarina (state)) Autódromo Internacional de Chapecó; Chapecó, Santa Catarina | "Oval Track" | 30–31 October |
| 9 | (Federal District (Brazil)) Autódromo Internacional de Brasília; Brasília, Distrito Federal | | 28–29 November |

== Results and standings ==
Bold indicates overall winner.

| Circuit | Round | Race | Pole position | Fastest lap | NASCAR Brasil Winners | Challenge Winners |
|---|---|---|---|---|---|---|
| (São Paulo (state)) Autódromo Panamericano | NC | 0 | – | – | (Brazil) Vitor Genz | – |
| (Rio Grande do Sul) Autódromo Internacional de Santa Cruz do Sul | 1 | 1 | | (Brazil) Vitor Genz | (Brazil) Thiago Camilo | (Brazil) Alfredinho Ibiapina |
| (Rio Grande do Sul) Autódromo Internacional de Santa Cruz do Sul | 1 | 2 | (Brazil) Vitor Genz | (Brazil) Cacá Bueno | (Brazil) Gabriel Casagrande | (Brazil) Dudes Castroneves |
| (Paraná (state)) Autódromo Internacional de Cascavel | 2 | 3 | (Brazil) Denis Navarro (Note: The Superpole was canceled duo the heavy rain and Denis Navarro who finished first in Q1 was declared the pole position, but no point was awarded.) | (Brazil) Nicolas Costa | (Brazil) Gabriel Casagrande | (Brazil) Juninho Berlanda |
| (Paraná (state)) Autódromo Internacional de Cascavel | 2 | 4 | | (Brazil) Gabriel Casagrande | (Brazil) Nicolas Costa | (Brazil) Bruna Tomaselli |
| (São Paulo (state)) Autódromo José Carlos Pace | 3 | 5 | (Brazil) Cacá Bueno | (Brazil) Murilo Rocha | (Brazil) Nicolas Costa | (Brazil) Murilo Rocha |
| (São Paulo (state)) Autódromo José Carlos Pace | 3 | 6 | | (Brazil) Thiago Camilo | (Brazil) Nicolas Costa | (Brazil) Tito Giaffone |
| (São Paulo (state)) Autódromo Velo Città | 4 | 7 | (Brazil) Thiago Camilo | (Brazil) Vitor Genz | (Brazil) Vitor Genz | (Brazil) Gui Backes |
| (São Paulo (state)) Autódromo Velo Città | 4 | 8 | | (Brazil) Vitor Genz | (Brazil) Galid Osman | (Brazil) Firás Fahs |
| Autódromo Internacional de Mato Grosso | 5 | 9 | (Brazil) Alfredinho Ibiapina | (Brazil) Murilo Rocha | (Brazil) Gabriel Casagrande | (Brazil) Murilo Rocha |
| Autódromo Internacional de Mato Grosso | 5 | 10 | | (Brazil) Murilo Rocha | (Brazil) Arthur Gama | (Brazil) Felipinho Tozzo |
| (Paraná (state)) Autódromo Internacional Ayrton Senna | 6 | 11 | (Brazil) Thiago Camilo | (Brazil) Ricardo Maurício | (Brazil) Thiago Camilo | (Brazil) Gui Backes |
| (Paraná (state)) Autódromo Internacional Ayrton Senna | 6 | 12 | | (Brazil) Gui Backes | (Brazil) Gabriel Casagrande | (Brazil) Murilo Rocha |
| (Minas Gerais) Circuito dos Cristais | 7 | 13 | (Brazil) Vitor Genz | (Brazil) Vitor Genz | (Brazil) Thiago Camilo | (Brazil) Witold Ramasauskas |
| (Minas Gerais) Circuito dos Cristais | 7 | 14 | | (Brazil) Felipe Malinowski | (Colombia) Tatiana Calderón | (Colombia) Tatiana Calderón |
| (Santa Catarina (state)) Autódromo Internacional de Chapecó | 8 | 15 | (Brazil) Gabriel Casagrande | (Brazil) Gabriel Casagrande | (Brazil) Gabriel Casagrande | (Brazil) Gui Backes |
| (Santa Catarina (state)) Autódromo Internacional de Chapecó | 8 | 16 | | (Brazil) Gabriel Casagrande | (Brazil) Gabriel Casagrande | (Brazil) Witold Ramasauskas |
| (Santa Catarina (state)) Autódromo Internacional de Chapecó | 8 | 17 | | (Brazil) Gabriel Casagrande | (Brazil) Arthur Gama | (Brazil) Alfredinho Ibiapina |
| (Federal District (Brazil)) Autódromo Internacional de Brasília | 9 | 18 | | | | |
| (Federal District (Brazil)) Autódromo Internacional de Brasília | 9 | 19 | | | | |
| (Federal District (Brazil)) Autódromo Internacional de Brasília | 9 | 20 | | | | |

Notes:

Regular season rounds
Playoffs rounds

Championship points:

| Races | Position, points per race | | | | | | | | | | | |
| Races | 1st | 2nd | 3rd | 4th | 5th | 6th | 7th | 8th | 9th | 10th | 11th | 12th |
|---|---|---|---|---|---|---|---|---|---|---|---|---|
| Races 1, 2 and 3 | 25 | 20 | 16 | 14 | 12 | 10 | 8 | 6 | 4 | 3 | 2 | 1 |
| Superpole | 10 | 8 | 6 | 4 | 2 | 1 | 0 | | | | | |
| Oval Qualy | 25 | 20 | 16 | 14 | 12 | 10 | 8 | 6 | 4 | 3 | 2 | 1 |

Notes- Pole position awarded by fastest qualifying time. †– Drivers did not finish the race, but were classified as they completed more than 75% of the race distance. 1 2 3 4 5 6 7 8 9 10 11 12 - Superpole position.

Standings:
| Pos | Driver | (Rio Grande do Sul) SCZ | | (Paraná (state)) CAS | | (São Paulo (state)) INT | | (São Paulo (state)) VEL | | (Mato Grosso) MAT | | (Paraná (state)) LON | | (Minas Gerais) CUR | | (Santa Catarina (state)) CHA | | | (Federal District (Brazil)) BRA | | | Points | Playoffs Points |
| Pos | Driver | R1 | R2 | R1 | R2 | R1 | R2 | R1 | R2 | R1 | R2 | R1 | R2 | R1 | R2 | R1 | R2 | R3 | R1 | R2 | R3 | Points | Playoffs Points |
| Pos | Driver | NASCAR Brasil Championship | | | | | | | | | | | | | | | | | | | | | |
| 1 | (Brazil) Arthur Gama | 12 | 5^{2} | 5 | 2 | Ret^{2} | Ret | 4 | 2 | 2^{4} | 1 | 10 | 3 | 3^{7} | 4 | 4 | 2 | 1 | | | | 294 | +30 |
| 2 | (Brazil) Gabriel Casagrande | 9 | 1^{4} | 1 | 4 | 16^{5} | 12 | 2^{2} | 11 | 1^{3} | 14 | 2^{2} | 1 | 19 | 14 | 1 | 1 | 2 | | | | 293 | +30 |
| 3 | (Brazil) Thiago Camilo | 1 | 4^{3} | 21 | Ret | 3 | 2 | **5^{1}** | 10 | Ret | Ret | **1^{1}** | 2 | 1^{2} | Ret | 11 | Ret | Ret | | | | 238 | +30 |
| 4 | (Brazil) Vitor Genz | 2 | **2^{1}** | 9 | 8 | 11 | 5 | 1^{4} | 4 | 8 | 5 | 13 | 15 | 18^{1} | Ret | 17 | 17 | 6 | | | | 202 | +30 |
| 5 | (Brazil) Nicolas Costa | 17 | 3 | 6 | 1 | 1^{4} | 1 | 6^{6} | DSQ | 11^{5} | 3 | 22 | 10 | 14 | Ret | | | | | | | 169 | +30 |
| 6 | (Brazil) Cacá Bueno | 3 | 6^{6} | Ret | Ret | **20^{1}** | 3 | 7 | 15 | Ret^{2} | 12 | 6 | 4 | 6^{12} | 10 | 12 | 5 | 15 | | | | 151 | +30 |
| 7 | (Brazil) Galid Osman | 6 | 9 | 12 | 7 | 17 | Ret | 3^{3} | 1 | DSQ | Ret | 18 | Ret | 15 | 8 | 5 | 4 | 5 | | | | 136 | +20 |
| 8 | (Brazil) Alfredinho Ibiapina | 8 | 14 | 14 | Ret | 12 | 6 | 15 | DSQ | 7^{1} | 17 | 4^{5} | 6 | 5^{8} | 7 | 10 | 8 | 3 | | | | 132 | +20 |
| 9 | (Brazil) Murillo Rocha | 18 | 10 | 17 | Ret | 2^{6} | 13 | 19 | 5 | 3^{6} | 20 | 7 | 5 | 13^{9} | 16 | 3 | 18 | 8 | | | | 119 | +20 |
| 10 | (Brazil) Witold Ramasauskas | 13 | 8 | 16 | 11 | 8 | 7 | 13 | 13 | 9 | 15 | 11 | 19 | 2^{4} | 5 | 9 | 6 | Ret | | | | 105 | +20 |
| 11 | (Brazil) Ricardo Maurício | 7 | Ret | 3 | 5 | 15 | Ret | 17 | 7 | | | DSQ^{3} | 9 | 11 | 3 | 23 | 16 | 17 | | | | 92 | +20 |
| 12 | (Colombia) Tatiana Calderón | 20 | 12 | 20 | Ret | Ret | 10 | 12 | 6 | 17 | 9 | 9 | 18 | 4 | 1 | 14 | 7 | 16 | | | | 91 | +20 |
| 13 | (Brazil) Gui Backes | Ret | 16 | 10 | 10 | 10 | 8 | 9^{5} | 16 | 18 | 10 | 3^{4} | Ret | Ret^{5} | | 2 | Ret | Ret | | | | 76 | |
| 14 | (Brazil) Jorge Martelli | 11 | Ret | Ret | 12 | 5 | Ret | 24 | DSQ | 6 | 6 | 5 | Ret | 16^{11} | 9 | 6 | 19 | 9 | | | | 67 | |
| 15 | (Brazil) Denis Navarro | Ret | DNS | **4** | 6 | 4 | 16 | 22 | Ret | 4 | 21 | 19 | 7 | 7 | Ret | 20 | 13 | Ret | | | | 62 | |
| 16 | (Brazil) Victor Andrade | 14 | Ret | 2 | 3 | 6^{5} | 14 | 18 | Ret | Ret | 8 | 14 | 8 | | | | | | | | | 60 | |
| 17 | (Brazil) Felipinho Tozzo | 15 | 11 | 13 | Ret | 13 | 15 | 16 | 12 | 5 | 2 | 8 | 13 | 9^{10} | 13 | 19 | 21 | 12 | | | | 49 | |
| 18 | (Brazil) Bruna Tomaselli | 21 | 15 | 15 | 9 | 7 | Ret | 20 | 9 | 15 | 4 | 17 | 16 | Ret | 17 | 15 | 10 | 7 | | | | 43 | |
| 19 | (Brazil) Ricardo Zonta | 5 | Ret | 8 | 14 | 18 | 11 | 8 | Ret | 13 | 19 | Ret | 14 | | | 13 | 3 | 14 | | | | 42 | |
| 20 | (Brazil) Firás Fahs | | | | | | | 11 | 3 | 12 | 16 | 15 | 21 | 17^{3} | 15 | 7 | Ret | Ret | | | | 41 | |
| 21 | (Brazil) Tito Giaffone | 10 | Ret^{5} | 11 | 15 | 9 | 4 | 14 | Ret | 16 | 11 | 21 | 11 | Ret | 12 | 8 | 22 | 11 | | | | 38 | |
| 22 | (Brazil) Felipe Malinowski | | | | | | | | | | | | | 8^{6} | 2 | | | | | | | 36 | |
| 23 | (Brazil) Juninho Berlanda | | | 7 | 13 | Ret | 17 | 10 | 14 | 19 | 13 | 12 | 12 | 10 | 6 | Ret | 15 | Ret | | | | 26 | |
| 24 | (Brazil) Dudes Castroneves | 19 | 7 | 19 | Ret | 14 | Ret | 21 | 8 | 10 | 18 | 16 | 20 | 12 | 11 | 24 | 12 | Ret | | | | 21 | |
| 25 | (Brazil) Alex Seid | 7 | Ret | | | 15 | Ret | 17 | 7 | Ret | Ret | | | | | | | | | | | 16 | |
| 26 | (Brazil) Allam Khodair | 4 | Ret | | | | | | | | | | | | | | | | | | | 14 | |
| 27 | (Brazil) Antonella Bassani | | | | | | | | | | | | | | | 22 | 14 | 4 | | | | 14 | |
| 28 | (Brazil) Gustavo Bandeira | 16 | 13 | Ret | Ret | 19 | 9 | 23 | 17 | 14 | 7 | 20 | 17 | Ret | Ret | | | | | | | 12 | |
| 29 | (Greece) Thomas Krasonis | | | | | | | | | | | | | | | 16 | 11 | 10 | | | | 5 | |
| 30 | (Brazil) Sergio Ramalho | | | | | | | | | | | | | | | 21 | 9 | 13 | | | | 4 | |
| 31 | (Brazil) Rafaela Ferreira | | | | | | | | | | | | | | | 18 | 20 | Ret | | | | 0 | |
Challenge Championship
| 1 | (Brazil) Alfredinho Ibiapina | 1 | 7 | 5 | Ret | 6 | 2 | 7 | DSQ | 3 | 10 | 2 | 2 | 3^{5} | 5 | 6 | 3 | 1 | | | | 218 | |
| 2 | (Brazil) Witold Ramasauskas | 3 | 2 | 7 | 3 | 3 | 3 | 5 | 7 | 4 | 8 | 6 | 9 | 1^{2} | 3 | 5 | 1 | Ret | | | | 216 | |
| 3 | (Brazil) Murilo Rocha | 6 | 3 | 8 | Ret | 1 | 7 | 9 | 2 | 1 | 12 | 3 | 1 | 8^{6} | 10 | 2 | 9 | 4 | | | | 202 | |
| 4 | (Colombia) Tatiana Calderón | 8 | 5 | 10 | Ret | Ret | 6 | 4 | 3 | 10 | 4 | 5 | 8 | 2^{8} | 1 | 7 | 2 | 8 | | | | 177 | |
| 5 | (Brazil) Felipinho Tozzo | 4 | 4 | 4 | Ret | 7 | 8 | 8 | 6 | 2 | 1 | 4 | 5 | 5^{7} | 8 | 11 | 11 | 7 | | | | 167 | |
| 6 | (Brazil) Gui Backes | Ret | 9 | 2 | 2 | 5 | 4 | 1 | 9 | 11 | 5 | 1 | Ret | Ret^{3} | Ret | 1 | Ret | Ret | | | | 153 | |
| 7 | (Brazil) Tito Giaffone | 2 | Ret | 3 | 5 | 4 | 1 | 6 | Ret | 9 | 6 | 12 | 3 | Ret^{9} | 7 | 4 | 12 | 6 | | | | 163 | |
| 8 | (Brazil) Bruna Tomaselli | 9 | 8 | 6 | 1 | 2 | Ret | 10 | 7 | 8 | 2 | 10 | 6 | Ret^{10} | 11 | 8 | 4 | 3 | | | | 154 | |
| 9 | (Brazil) Juninho Berlanda | | | 1 | 4 | Ret | 9 | 2 | 8 | 12 | 7 | 7 | 4 | 6^{11} | 4 | Ret | 8 | Ret | | | | 130 | |
| 10 | (Brazil) Dudes Castroneves | 7 | 1 | 9 | Ret | 8 | Ret | 11 | 5 | 5 | 11 | 9 | 10 | 7 | 6 | 13 | 6 | Ret | | | | 108 | |
| 11 | (Brazil) Firás Fahs | | | | | | | 3 | 1 | 6 | 9 | 8 | 11 | 9^{1} | 9 | 3 | Ret | Ret | | | | 81 | |
| 12 | (Brazil) Gustavo Bandeira | 5 | 6 | Ret | Ret | 9 | 5 | 12 | 11 | 7 | 3 | 11 | 7 | Ret^{12} | Ret | | | | | | | 76 | |
| 13 | (Brazil) Felipe Malinowski | | | | | | | | | | | | | 8^{4} | 2 | | | | | | | 34 | |
| 14 | (Brazil) Antonella Bassani | | | | | | | | | | | | | | | 12 | 7 | 2 | | | | 29 | |
| 15 | (Greece) Thomas Krasonis | | | | | | | | | | | | | | | 9 | 5 | 5 | | | | 28 | |
| 16 | (Brazil) Rafaela Ferreira | | | | | | | | | | | | | | | 10 | 10 | Ret | | | | 6 | |

== See also ==
- 2026 NASCAR Cup Series
- 2026 NASCAR O'Reilly Auto Parts Series
- 2026 NASCAR Craftsman Truck Series
- 2026 ARCA Menards Series
- 2026 ARCA Menards Series East
- 2026 ARCA Menards Series West
- 2026 NASCAR Whelen Modified Tour
- 2026 NASCAR Euro Series
- 2026 NASCAR Canada Series
- 2026 CARS Tour
- 2026 SMART Modified Tour
