= 2026 TCR Brasil Touring Car Championship =

Motor racing competition

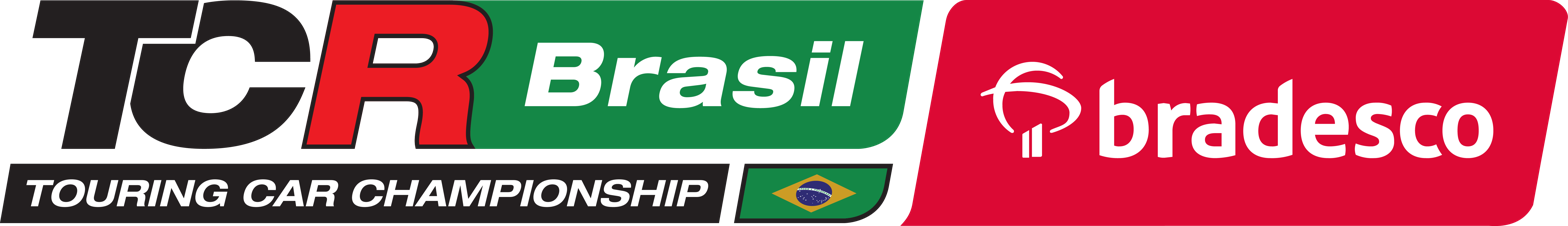
Official Logo since 15. July 2026

The 2026 TCR Brazil Touring Car Championship is the fourth season of TCR Brasil Touring Car Championship.

== Calendar ==
Announced on 5 January 2026, the championship was contested of 5 rounds across Brazil. However, the calendar is updated again on 15 January 2026, Autódromo Internacional de Cascavel replaced Autódromo Internacional de Santa Cruz do Sul. The season began at Circuito dos Cristais in March and finished at Autódromo Velo Città in end of July.

Race was an Endurance Event
Race was held together with TCR South America

| Rnd. | Circuit/Location | Dates | Support bill | Map |
|---|---|---|---|---|
| 1 | (Brazil) Circuito dos Cristais, Curvelo | 6–8 March | Stock Car Pro Series | 2026 TCR Brasil Touring Car Championship is located in South America |
| 2 | (Brazil) Autódromo Internacional de Cascavel, Cascavel | 27–29 March | Stock Car Pro Series; Turismo Nacional BR | 2026 TCR Brasil Touring Car Championship is located in South America |
| 3 | (Brazil) Interlagos Circuit, São Paulo | 24–26 April | Stock Car Pro Series; Stock Light; F4 Brazilian Championship | 2026 TCR Brasil Touring Car Championship is located in South America |
| 4 | (Brazil) Autódromo Internacional de Mato Grosso, Cuiabá | 19–20 June | Stock Car Pro Series; Stock Light; Turismo Nacional BR | 2026 TCR Brasil Touring Car Championship is located in South America |
| 5 | (Brazil) Autódromo Velo Città, Mogi Guaçu | 24–26 July | Stock Car Pro Series; Stock Light; F4 Brazilian Championship | 2026 TCR Brasil Touring Car Championship is located in South America |

== Teams and drivers ==
| Team | Car | No. | Drivers | Class | Rounds | Co-Driver name | Rounds |
|---|---|---|---|---|---|---|---|
| (Brazil) Cobra Racing Team | Toyota GR Corolla Sport TCR | 07 | (Brazil) Thiago Vivacqua | | All | (Brazil) Nicolas Costa | 1 |
| (Brazil) Cobra Racing Team | Toyota GR Corolla Sport TCR | 47 | (Argentina) Norberto Fontana | | 1 | (Brazil) Felipe Maluhy | 1 |
| (Brazil) / W2 Shell V-Power (Note: Car No. 28 entered as "W2 Shell V-Power". Car No. 2, No. 37, No. 77 and No. 85 entered as "W2 ProGP".); (Brazil) / W2 ProGP | Cupra León Competición TCR | 2 | (Brazil) Marcio Basso | T | 6 | —N/a | |
| (Brazil) / W2 Shell V-Power; (Brazil) / W2 ProGP | Cupra León Competición TCR | 37 | (Brazil) Guilherme Reischl | T | 1–5 | (Brazil) Guilherme Salas | 1 |
| (Brazil) / W2 Shell V-Power; (Brazil) / W2 ProGP | Cupra León Competición TCR | 28 | (Brazil) Galid Osman | | 1 | (Brazil) Felipe Lapenna | 1 |
| (Brazil) / W2 Shell V-Power; (Brazil) / W2 ProGP | Cupra León VZ TCR | 28 | (Brazil) Galid Osman | | 2–6 | —N/a | |
| (Brazil) / W2 Shell V-Power; (Brazil) / W2 ProGP | Cupra León VZ TCR | 77 | (Brazil) Raphael Reis | | All | (Brazil) Lucas Foresti | 1 |
| (Argentina) Squadra Martino | Honda Civic Type R TCR (FK8) | 3 | (Brazil) Rodrigo Baptista | | 1–4 | (Brazil) Diego Nunes | 1 |
| (Argentina) Squadra Martino | Honda Civic Type R TCR (FK8) | 9 | (Brazil) Nelson Piquet Jr. | | 5 | —N/a | |
| (Argentina) Squadra Martino | Honda Civic Type R TCR (FK8) | 15 | (Uruguay) Enrique Maglione | T | All | (Uruguay) Rodrigo Aramendia | 1 |
| (Argentina) Squadra Martino | Honda Civic Type R TCR (FK8) | 34 | (Brazil) Fabio Casagrande | T | All | (Argentina) Franco Coscia | 1 |
| (Argentina) Squadra Martino | Honda Civic Type R TCR (FL5) | 60 | (Uruguay) Juan Manuel Casella | | All | (Argentina) Ignacio Montenegro | 1 |
| (Argentina) Paladini Racing | Toyota GR Corolla Sport TCR | 5 | (Argentina) Fabián Yannantuoni | | 1–5 | (Spain) Enric Bordás Cotes | 1 |
| (Argentina) Paladini Racing | Toyota GR Corolla Sport TCR | 16 | (Argentina) Juan Ángel Rosso | | All | (Argentina) Facundo Marques | 1 |
| (Argentina) PMO Racing | Peugeot 308 TCR | 8 | (Brazil) Rafael Suzuki | | 4–6 | —N/a | |
| (Argentina) PMO Racing | Peugeot 308 TCR | 27 | (Brazil) Marcos Regadas | T | 2–4, 5 | —N/a | |
| (Argentina) PMO Racing | Peugeot 308 TCR | 88 | (Brazil) Werner Neugebauer | | 1 | (Brazil) Caca Bueno | 1 |
| (Brazil) BRB Banco de Brasília by PMO Racing | Peugeot 308 TCR | 43 | (Brazil) Pedro Cardoso | | All | (Brazil) Celso Neto | 1 |
| Toyota Team Argentina | Toyota GR Corolla Sport TCR | 17 | (Argentina) Matías Rossi | | 2–6 | —N/a | |
| (Uruguay) PMO – Full Time Sports | Lynk & Co 03 TCR | 27 | (Brazil) Marcos Regadas | T | 1 | (Brazil) Rafael Suzuki | 1 |
| (Uruguay) PMO – Full Time Sports | Lynk & Co 03 TCR | 55 | (Brazil) Lucas Fecury | | 1 | (Brazil) Arthur Leist | 1 |

| Icon | Class |
|---|---|
| T | Eligible for TCR Trophy |

== Results ==
=== Season summary ===
| Rnd. | | Circuit | Pole position | Fastest lap | Winning driver | Winning team | Winning Trophy driver | Info |
|---|---|---|---|---|---|---|---|---|
| 1 | 1 | (Brazil) Interlagos Circuit | (Uruguay) Juan Manuel Casella (Argentina) Ignacio Montenegro | (Brazil) Raphael Reis (Brazil) Lucas Foresti | (Brazil) Raphael Reis (Brazil) Lucas Foresti | (Brazil) W2 ProGP | (Brazil) Guilherme Reischl (Brazil) Guilherme Salas | |
| 2 | 2 | (Brazil) Autódromo Internacional de Cascavel | (Brazil) Galid Osman | (Argentina) Matías Rossi | (Brazil) Galid Osman | (Brazil) W2 ProGP | (Brazil) Marcos Regadas | |
| 2 | 3 | (Brazil) Autódromo Internacional de Cascavel | | (Argentina) Matías Rossi | (Argentina) Juan Ángel Rosso | (Argentina) Paladini Racing | (Brazil) Marcos Regadas | |
| 3 | 4 | (Brazil) Autódromo Internacional de Cascavel | (Brazil) Rodrigo Baptista | (Brazil) Rodrigo Baptista | (Brazil) Rodrigo Baptista | (Argentina) Squadra Martino | (Brazil) Fabio Casagrande | |
| 3 | 5 | (Brazil) Autódromo Internacional de Cascavel | | (Argentina) Fabián Yannantuoni | (Argentina) Fabián Yannantuoni | (Argentina) Paladini Racing | (Brazil) Fabio Casagrande | |
| 4 | 6 | (Brazil) Autódromo Velo Città | (Brazil) Pedro Cardoso | (Argentina) Matías Rossi | (Argentina) Matías Rossi | Toyota Gazoo Racing Argentina | (Brazil) Marcos Regadas | |
| 4 | 7 | (Brazil) Autódromo Velo Città | | (Brazil) Rafael Suzuki | (Brazil) Rafael Suzuki | (Argentina) PMO Racing | (Brazil) Marcos Regadas | |
| 5 | 8 | (Brazil) Interlagos Circuit | (Brazil) Raphael Reis | (Brazil) Rafael Suzuki | (Brazil) Rafael Suzuki | (Argentina) PMO Racing | (Brazil) Guilherme Reischl | |
| 5 | 9 | (Brazil) Interlagos Circuit | | (Brazil) Nelson Piquet Jr. | (Brazil) Rafael Suzuki | (Argentina) PMO Racing | (Uruguay) Enrique Maglione | |
| 6 | 10 | (Argentina) Autódromo Oscar y Juan Gálvez | (Uruguay) Juan Manuel Casella | (Brazil) Raphael Reis | (Brazil) Galid Osman | (Brazil) W2 ProGP | (Brazil) Marcos Regadas | |
| 6 | 11 | (Argentina) Autódromo Oscar y Juan Gálvez | | (Uruguay) Juan Manuel Casella | (Uruguay) Juan Manuel Casella | (Argentina) Squadra Martino | (Uruguay) Enrique Maglione | |

== Championship standings ==
Scoring system

| Position | 1st | 2nd | 3rd | 4th | 5th | 6th | 7th | 8th | 9th | 10th | 11th | 12th | 13th | 14th | 15th |
| Qualifying | 10 | 7 | 5 | 4 | 3 | 2 | 1 | —N/a | | | | | | | |
| Endurance | 40 | 35 | 30 | 27 | 24 | 21 | 18 | 15 | 13 | 11 | 9 | 7 | 5 | 3 | 1 |
| Races 2–5 | 35 | 30 | 27 | 24 | 21 | 18 | 15 | 13 | 11 | 9 | 7 | 5 | 3 | 2 | 1 |

=== Drivers' championship ===
| Pos. | Driver | INT (Brazil) | CAS (Brazil) | | CAS (Brazil) | | VEL (Brazil) | | INT (Brazil) | | BUE (Argentina) | | Points |
| Pos. | Driver | EDC | RD1 | RD2 | RD1 | RD2 | RD1 | RD2 | RD1 | RD2 | RD1 | RD2 | Points |
|---|---|---|---|---|---|---|---|---|---|---|---|---|---|
| 1 | (Brazil) Pedro Cardoso | 2^{5} | 3^{2} | 6 | 3^{6} | Ret | 3^{1} | 5 | 5^{4} | 7 | 4^{2} | 2 | 274 |
| 2 | (Argentina) Juan Ángel Rosso | 3^{6} | 11^{5} | 1 | 10^{7} | 11 | 12 | 10 | 9^{3} | DNS | 2^{5} | 3 | 271 |
| 3 | (Brazil) Raphael Reis | 1^{2} | 5^{3} | 4 | 6^{5} | 10 | 7^{5} | 2 | 7^{1} | 2 | 11^{4} | 5 | 248 |
| 4 | (Argentina) Matías Rossi | | 2^{4} | 3 | 12^{3} | 3 | 1^{3} | 4 | 10 | Ret | 8^{3} | 4 | 231 |
| 5 | (Brazil) Galid Osman | 10†^{3} | 1^{1} | 8 | 2^{2} | Ret | 2^{4} | 6 | Ret^{6} | Ret | 1^{7} | 8 | 230 |
| 6 | (Uruguay) Juan Manuel Casella | DSQ^{1} | 4 | 7 | 5^{4} | 4 | 6^{7} | 8 | 6 | Ret | 3^{1} | 1 | 228 |
| 7 | (Brazil) Rafael Suzuki | 11†^{7} | | | | | 9^{6} | 1 | 1^{2} | 1 | 6^{6} | 6 | 186 |
| 8 | (Brazil) Rodrigo Baptista | Ret^{4} | 6^{6} | 5 | 1^{1} | 5 | 5^{2} | Ret | | | | | 158 |
| 9 | (Argentina) Fabián Yannantuoni | 9† | 9 | 11 | 7 | 1 | Ret | INF | 4^{5} | 3 | | | 142 |
| 10 | (Brazil) Thiago Vivacqua | 4 | 8^{7} | 2 | 8 | 6 | 13† | Ret | 8 | Ret | 12 | 10 | 141 |
| 11 | (Uruguay) Enrique Maglione | Ret | 10 | 10 | 11 | 8 | 10 | 9 | Ret | 4 | 9 | 7 | 117 |
| 12 | (Brazil) Marcos Regadas | 11†^{7} | 7 | 9 | Ret | 9 | 8 | 7 | Ret | DNS | 5 | 11 | 104 |
| 13 | (Brazil) Guilherme Reischl | 7 | 11 | 12 | 10 | 11† | 12 | 10 | 9 | DNS | | | 93 |
| 14 | (Brazil) Fabio Casagrande | Ret | DNQ | DNS | 9 | 7 | 11 | 11† | Ret | 5 | 10 | 9 | 91 |
| 15 | (Brazil) Nelson Piquet Jr. | | | | | | | | 2^{7} | 8† | | | 48 |
| 16 | (Brazil) Lucas Foresti | 1^{2} | | | | | | | | | | | 47 |
| 17 | (Brazil) Celso Neto | 2^{5} | | | | | | | | | | | 38 |
| 18 | (Brazil) Guilherme Salas | 3 | | | | | | | | | | | 30 |
| 19 | (Brazil) Nicolas Costa | 4 | | | | | | | | | | | 27 |
| 20 | (Brazil) Lucas Fecury | 5 | | | | | | | | | | | 24 |
| 21 | (Brazil) Arthur Leist | 5 | | | | | | | | | | | 24 |
| 22 | (Argentina) Norberto Fontana | 6 | | | | | | | | | | | 21 |
| 23 | (Brazil) Felipe Maluhy | 6 | | | | | | | | | | | 21 |
| 24 | (Argentina) Facundo Marques | 7^{6} | | | | | | | | | | | 20 |
| 25 | (Brazil) Márcio Basso | | | | | | | | | | 7 | Ret | 19 |
| 26 | (Brazil) Werner Neugebauer | 8 | | | | | | | | | | | 15 |
| 27 | (Brazil) Cacá Bueno | 8 | | | | | | | | | | | 15 |
| 28 | (Brazil) Felipe Lapenna | 10†^{3} | | | | | | | | | | | 14 |
| 29 | (Spain) Enric Bordás Cotes | 9† | | | | | | | | | | | 13 |
| 30 | (Argentina) Ignacio Montenegro | DSQ^{1} | | | | | | | | | | | 10 |
| 31 | (Brazil) Diego Nunes | Ret^{4} | | | | | | | | | | | 4 |
| NC | (Argentina) Franco Coscia | Ret | | | | | | | | | | | 0 |
| NC | (Uruguay) Rodrigo Aramendia | Ret | | | | | | | | | | | 0 |
| Pos. | Driver | INT (Brazil) | CAS (Brazil) | | CAS (Brazil) | | VEL (Brazil) | | INT (Brazil) | | BUE (Argentina) | | Points |

| Colour | Result |
|---|---|
| Gold | Winner |
| Silver | Second place |
| Bronze | Third place |
| Green | Points classification |
| Blue | Non-points classification |
| Blue | Non-classified finish (NC) |
| Purple | Retired, not classified (Ret) |
| Red | Did not qualify (DNQ) |
| Red | Did not pre-qualify (DNPQ) |
| Black | Disqualified (DSQ) |
| White | Did not start (DNS) |
| White | Withdrew (WD) |
| White | Race cancelled (C) |
| Blank | Did not practice (DNP) |
| Blank | Did not arrive (DNA) |
| Blank | Excluded (EX) |

^{1} ^{2} ^{3} ^{4} ^{5} ^{6} ^{7} – Points-scoring position in qualifying.

† – Drivers did not finish the race, but were classified as they completed over 75% of the race distance.

=== Trophy Cup ===
| Pos. | Driver | INT (Brazil) | CAS (Brazil) | | CAS (Brazil) | | VEL (Brazil) | | INT (Brazil) | | BUE (Argentina) | | Points |
| Pos. | Driver | EDC | RD1 | RD2 | RD1 | RD2 | RD1 | RD2 | RD1 | RD2 | RD1 | RD2 | Points |
|---|---|---|---|---|---|---|---|---|---|---|---|---|---|
| 1 | (Uruguay) Enrique Maglione | Ret^{3} | 2^{1} | 2 | 3^{1} | 2 | 2^{2} | 2 | Ret^{2} | 1 | 3^{2} | 1 | 329 |
| 2 | (Brazil) Marcos Regadas | 2†^{1} | 1^{2} | 1 | Ret^{4} | 3 | 1^{1} | 1 | Ret^{1} | DNS | 1^{1} | 3 | 321 |
| 3 | (Brazil) Fabio Casagrande | Ret^{4} | | | 1^{3} | 1 | 3^{3} | 4† | Ret^{3} | 2 | 4^{4} | 2 | 260 |
| 4 | (Brazil) Guilherme Reischl | 1^{2} | 3^{3} | 3 | 2^{2} | 4† | 4^{4} | 3 | 1^{1} | DNS | | | 255 |
| 5 | (Brazil) Guilherme Salas | 1^{2} | | | | | | | | | | | 40 |
| 6 | (Brazil) Rafael Suzuki | 2†^{1} | | | | | | | | | | | 35 |
| 7 | (Brazil) Márcio Basso | | | | | | | | | | 2^{3} | Ret | 34 |
| NC | (Argentina) Franco Coscia | Ret^{4} | | | | | | | | | | | 0 |
| NC | (Uruguay) Rodrigo Aramendia | Ret^{3} | | | | | | | | | | | 0 |
| Pos. | Driver | INT (Brazil) | CAS (Brazil) | | CAS (Brazil) | | VEL (Brazil) | | INT (Brazil) | | BUE (Argentina) | | Points |

=== Teams' championship ===
Best 2 (two) results from each team are counted for teams' championship.

| Pos. | Team | N.° | INT (Brazil) | CAS (Brazil) | | CAS (Brazil) | | VEL (Brazil) | | INT (Brazil) | | BUE (Argentina) | | Points |
| Pos. | Team | N.° | EDC | RD1 | RD2 | RD1 | RD2 | RD1 | RD2 | RD1 | RD2 | RD1 | RD2 | Points |
|---|---|---|---|---|---|---|---|---|---|---|---|---|---|---|
| 1 | (Argentina) PMO Racing | 8 | | | | | | 9^{6} | 1 | 1^{2} | 1 | 6^{6} | 6 | 521 |
| 1 | (Argentina) PMO Racing | 27 | | 7 | 9 | Ret | 9 | 8 | 7 | Ret | DNS | 5 | 11 | 521 |
| 1 | (Argentina) PMO Racing | 88 | 8 | | | | | | | | | | | 521 |
| 2 | (Brazil) W2 ProGP | 2 | | | | | | | | | | 7 | Ret | 505 |
| 2 | (Brazil) W2 ProGP | 28 | 10†^{3} | 1^{1} | 8 | 2^{2} | Ret | 2^{4} | 6 | Ret^{6} | Ret | 1^{7} | 8 | 505 |
| 2 | (Brazil) W2 ProGP | 37 | 7 | 11 | 12 | 10 | 11† | 12 | 10 | 9 | DNS | | | 505 |
| 2 | (Brazil) W2 ProGP | 77 | 1^{2} | 5^{3} | 4 | 6^{5} | 10 | 7^{5} | 2 | 7^{1} | 2 | 11^{4} | 5 | 505 |
| 3 | (Argentina) Squadra Martino | 3 | Ret^{4} | 6^{6} | 5 | 1^{1} | 5 | 5^{2} | Ret | | | | | 480 |
| 3 | (Argentina) Squadra Martino | 9 | | | | | | | | 2^{7} | 8† | | | 480 |
| 3 | (Argentina) Squadra Martino | 15 | Ret | 10 | 10 | 11 | 8 | 10 | 9 | Ret | 4 | 9 | 7 | 480 |
| 3 | (Argentina) Squadra Martino | 34 | Ret | DNQ | DNS | 9 | 7 | 11 | 11† | Ret | 5 | 10 | 9 | 480 |
| 3 | (Argentina) Squadra Martino | 60 | DSQ^{1} | 4 | 7 | 5^{4} | 4 | 6^{7} | 8 | 6 | Ret | 3^{1} | 1 | 480 |
| 4 | (Argentina) Paladini Racing | 5 | 9† | 9 | 11 | 7 | 1 | Ret | INF | 4^{5} | 3 | | | 431 |
| 4 | (Argentina) Paladini Racing | 16 | 3^{6} | 11^{5} | 1 | 10^{7} | 11 | 12 | 10 | 9^{3} | DNS | 2^{5} | 3 | 431 |
| 5 | (Brazil) BRB Banco de Brasília by PMO Racing | 43 | 2^{5} | 3^{2} | 6 | 3^{6} | Ret | 3^{1} | 5 | 5^{4} | 7 | 4^{2} | 2 | 274 |
| 6 | Toyota Team Argentina | 17 | | 2^{4} | 3 | 12^{3} | 3 | 1^{3} | 4 | 10 | Ret | 8^{3} | 4 | 231 |
| 7 | (Brazil) Cobra Racing | 07 | 4 | 8^{7} | 2 | 8 | 6 | 13† | Ret | 8 | Ret | 12 | 10 | 141 |
| 7 | (Brazil) Cobra Racing | 47 | 6 | | | | | | | | | | | 141 |
| 8 | (Uruguay) PMO – Full Time Sports | 27 | 11†^{7} | | | | | | | | | | | 36 |
| 8 | (Uruguay) PMO – Full Time Sports | 55 | 5 | | | | | | | | | | | 36 |
| Pos. | Team | N.° | INT (Brazil) | CAS (Brazil) | | CAS (Brazil) | | VEL (Brazil) | | INT (Brazil) | | BUE (Argentina) | | Points |

== See also ==
- List of TCR Series
- Production car racing
- Stock car racing
- Stock Car Pro Series
- SuperBike Brasil
- Moto 1000 GP
