= Bruna Tomaselli =

Brazilian racing driver

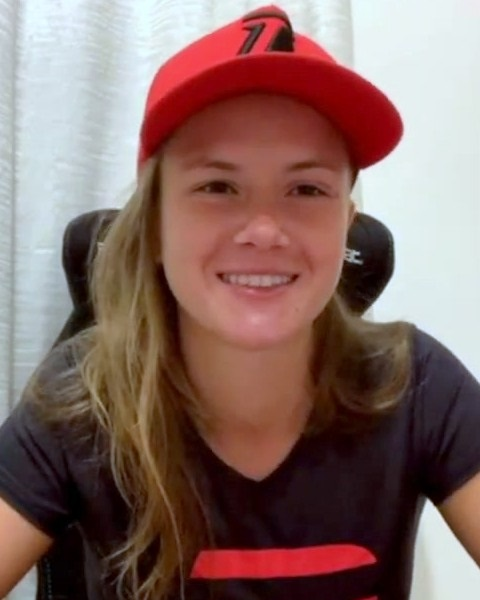
- Tomaselli during an interview
- Nationality: Brazilian
- Born: Bruna Alberti Tomaselli; 18 September 1997 (age 29) Caibi, Santa Catarina, Brazil

Previous series
- 2013–2014 2015–2016 2017–2019: Fórmula Junior Brasil; Fórmula 4 Sudamericana; U.S. F2000 National Championship

Bruna Alberti Tomaselli (born 18 September 1997 in Caibi) is a Brazilian female racing driver. She formerly competed in the W Series and has also raced in Stock Car Brasil.

== Biography ==
Tomaselli began her professional career in Fórmula Junior Brasil, a category comparable to Formula Ford in other countries. Following two seasons there, she would move up to Fórmula 4 Sudamericana, run to Formula Renault 1.6 regulations – where she finished fourth in her second season.

Tomaselli moved to the United States in 2017, joining the Road to Indy through the U.S. F2000 National Championship. She undertook a part-time campaign initially, and signed with Team Pelfrey for a full-time campaign in 2018 – finishing 16th in the standings. Tomaselli remained in U.S. F2000 in 2019, moving to Pabst Racing Services – improving to eighth overall with a top-five finish at Mid-Ohio.

Tomaselli attempted to qualify for the W Series, a Formula 3 championship for female drivers, in 2019 but failed to pass the evaluation day for potential recruits. She attempted to join the championship again for 2020, and would successfully join the 20-driver field. Following the cancellation of the 2020 season, Tomaselli competed in the 2021 W Series driving for Veloce Racing, alongside eventual champion Jamie Chadwick. She managed two top-ten finishes in eight rounds, with 12 points overall, finishing 15th in the Drivers' Championship. She was retained for the 2022 season, which she began with another top-five finish in the first race in Miami; afterwards she could only manage one point in the remaining six races and finished 12th in the championship after it was curtailed due to financial problems.

Tomaselli returned to Brazil in 2023, competing in second-tier domestic stock cars. She finished eighth overall in her début season with three top-five finishes. She remained in the championship for 2024, scoring a podium at Cascavel before being parachuted into the top-flight for the final round after Marcos Gomes suffered a medical episode. Following another season in the renamed Stock Light, scoring a podium at Velopark, Tomaselli was scheduled to make her full-time debut in Stock Car Brasil in 2026 with SG28 Racing – however, after the teams' cars were delivered late and without the required running gear, Tomaselli switched to the NASCAR Brasil Series.

== Racing record ==
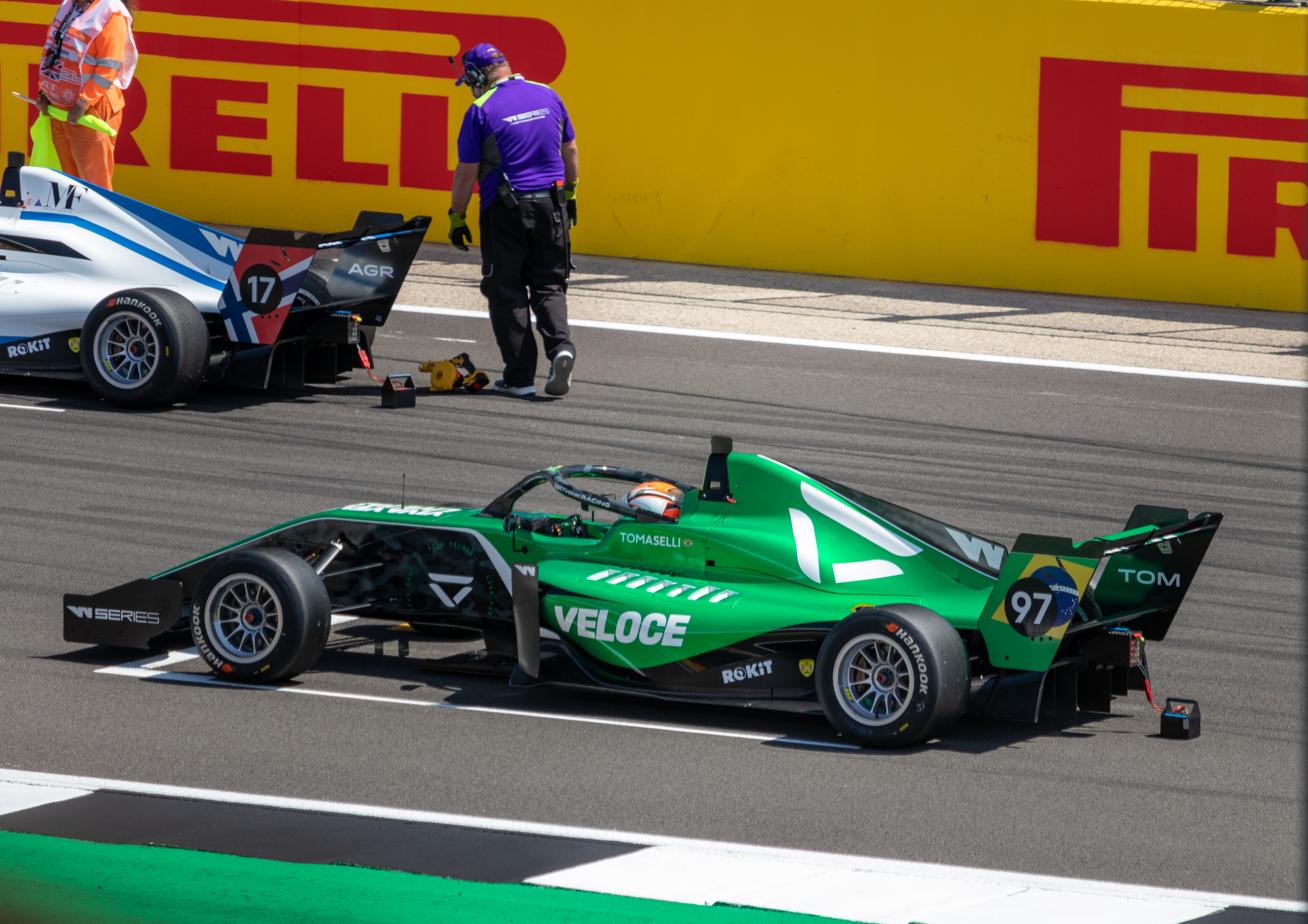
Tomaselli competing in the 2021 W Series Silverstone round.

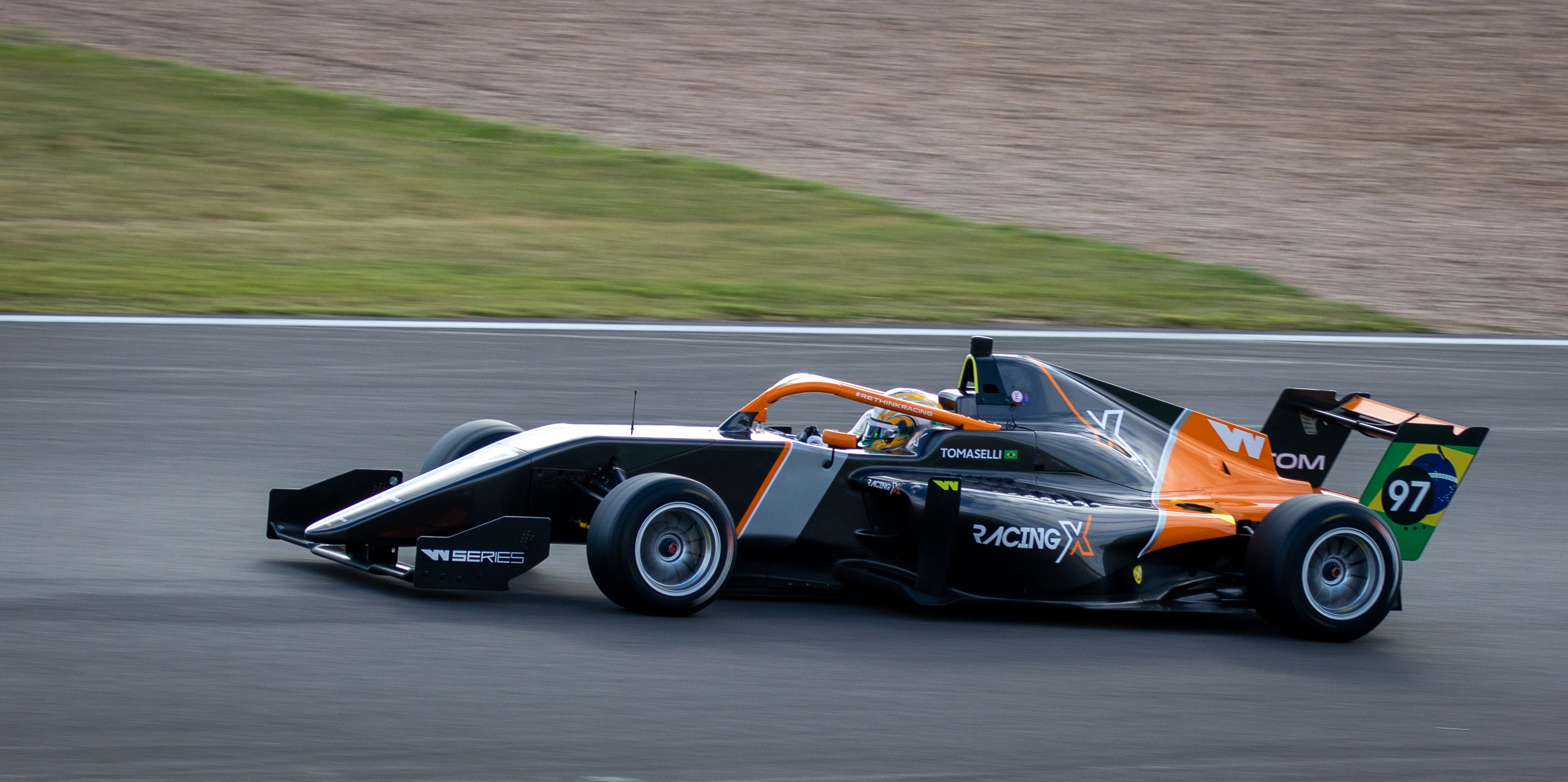
Tomaselli contesting the 2022 W Series Silverstone round.

=== Career summary ===
Season	Series	Team	Races	Wins	Poles	F/Laps	Podiums	Points	Position
2013	Fórmula Junior Brasil	Giocar Racing	16	0	1	0	1	99	7th
2014	Fórmula Junior Brasil	Giocar Racing	16	1	1	1	12	279	4th
2015	Fórmula 4 Sudamericana	N/A	11	0	0	0	0	118	7th
2016	Fórmula 4 Sudamericana	N/A	20	0	0	0	5	164	4th
2016–17	MRF Challenge Formula 2000	MRF Racing	4	0	0	0	0	5	19th
2017	U.S. F2000 National Championship	ArmsUp Motorsports	11	0	0	0	0	49	21st
2018	U.S. F2000 National Championship	Team Pelfrey	14	0	0	0	0	87	16th
2018	Formula Academy Sudamericana	N/A	6	0	0	0	3	86	5th
2019	U.S. F2000 National Championship	Pabst Racing Services	15	0	0	0	0	174	8th
2020	Imperio Endurance Brasil	Satti Racing	5	2	2	2	3	365	4th
2021	W Series	Veloce Racing	8	0	0	0	0	12	15th
2022	W Series	Racing X	7	0	0	0	0	11	12th
2023	Stock Series	Garra Racing	17	0	0	0	0	202	8th
2024	Stock Series	Garra Racing	15	0	0	0	1	204	10th
2024	Stock Car Pro Series	KTF Sports	2	0	0	0	0	21	30th
2025	Stock Light	SG28 Racing	18	0	0	0	1	184	9th
2026	NASCAR Brasil Series	SG28 Racing by Pole Motorsport	2	0	0	0	0	0	21st*
2026	NASCAR Brasil Challenge Championship	SG28 Racing by Pole Motorsport	2	0	0	0	0	10	9th*
2026	Stock Car Pro Series	SG28 by RTR	0	0	0	0	0	0	NC

^{*} Season still in progress.

=== American open–wheel racing results ===
==== U.S. F2000 National Championship ====
Year	Team	1	2	3	4	5	6	7	8	9	10	11	12	13	14	15	Rank	Points
2017	ArmsUp Motorsports	STP	STP	BAR; 15	BAR; 18	IMS; 14	IMS; 20	ROA; 19	ROA; 12	IOW	TOR	TOR	MOH; 15	MOH; 14	WGL; 15		21st	49
2018	Team Pelfrey	STP; 7	STP; 14	IMS; 19	IMS; 22	LOR; 14	ROA; 17	ROA; 11	TOR; 13	TOR; 13	MOH; 20	MOH; 13	MOH; 16	POR; 18	POR; 16		16th	87
2019	Pabst Racing Services	STP; 6	STP; 7	IMS; 10	IMS; 11	LOR; 19	ROA; 6	ROA; 11	TOR; 11	TOR; 7	MOH; 5	MOH; 10	POR; 9	POR; 9	LAG; 12	LAG; 10	8th	174

=== Complete W Series results ===
(key) (Races in bold indicate pole position) (Races in italics indicate fastest lap)

Year	Team	1	2	3	4	5	6	7	8	DC	Points
2021	Veloce Racing	RBR; 11	RBR; 5	SIL; 11	HUN; 9	SPA; 15	ZAN; 17	COA; 17	COA; 11	15th	12
2022	Racing X	MIA; 5	MIA; 17	CAT; 12	SIL; 11	LEC; 11	HUN; 10	SGP; 14		12th	11

=== Complete Stock Car Pro Series results ===
Year	Team	Car	1	2	3	4	5	6	7	8	9	10	11	12	13	14	15	16	17	18	19	20	21	22	23	24	25	Rank	Points
2024	KTF Sports	Chevrolet Cruze	GOI; 1	GOI; 2	VCA; 1	VCA; 2	INT; 1	INT; 2	CAS; 1	CAS; 2	VCA; 1	VCA; 2	VCA; 3	GOI; 1	GOI; 2	BLH; 1	BLH; 2	VEL; 1	VEL; 2	BUE; 1	BUE; 2	URU; 1	URU; 2	GOI; 1	GOI; 2	INT; 1; 19	INT; 2; 24	30th	21
2026	SG28 by RTR	Toyota Corolla Cross	CRS; 1 WD	CRS; 2 WD	CAS; 1	CAS; 2	INT; 1	INT; 2	GOI; 1	GOI; 2	CUI; 1	CUI; 2	VCA; 1	VCA; 2	SCZ; 1	SCZ; 2	CRS; 1	CRS; 2	BRA; 1	BRA; 2	CAS; 1	CAS; 2	VEL; 1	VEL; 2	INT; 1	INT; 2		35th*	0*

^{*} Season still in progress.
