= Alfredinho Ibiapina =

Brazilian racing driver (born 2008)

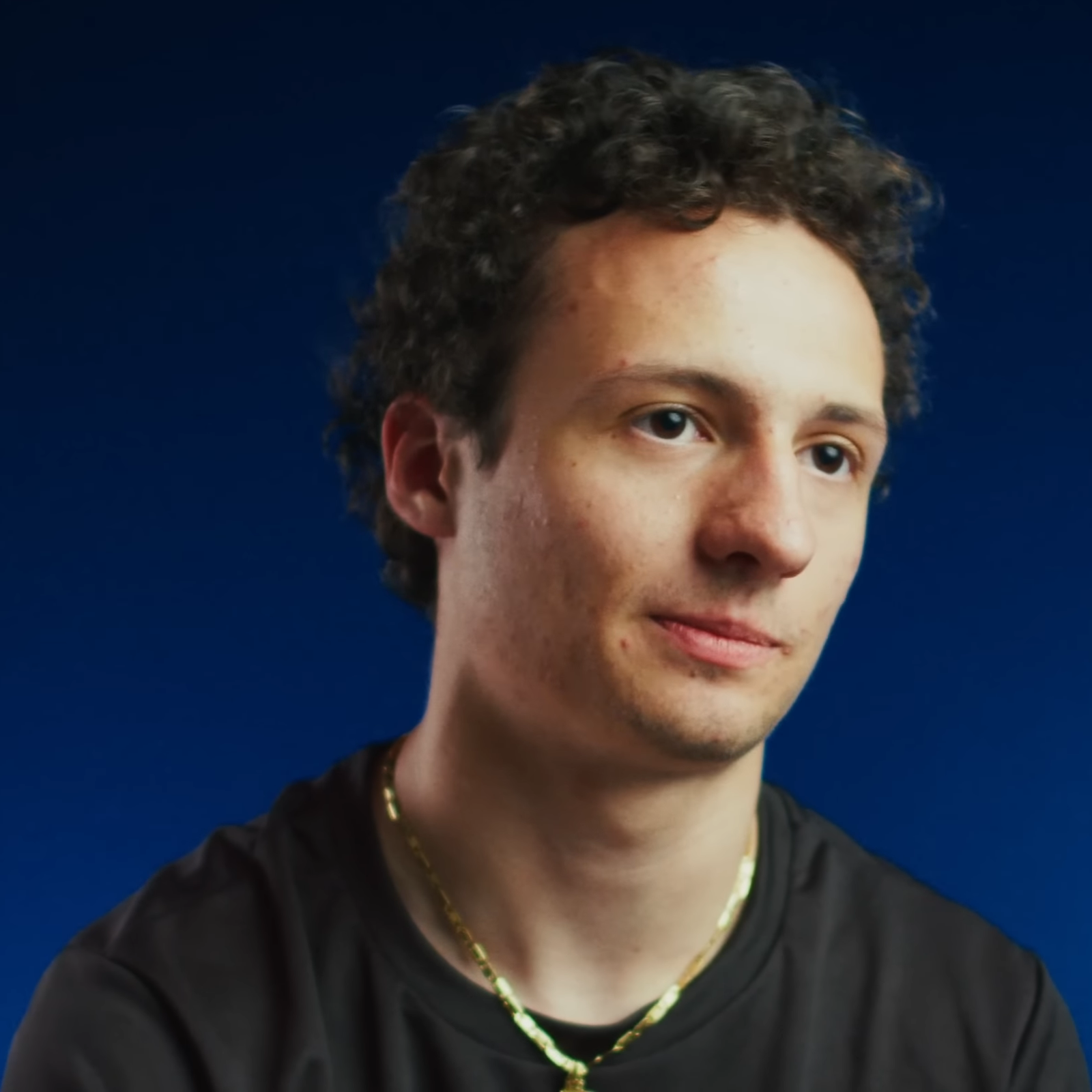
- Ibiapina in 2025
- Nationality: Brazilian
- Born: 18 April 2008 (age 18) Curitiba, Paraná, Brazil

NASCAR Brasil Series
- Years active: 2025
- Teams: Full Time Sports
- Starts: 21
- Wins: 1
- Poles: 1
- Fastest laps: 0
- Best finish: 8th in 2025

Alfredo "Alfredinho" Vieira Ibiapina Filho (born 18 April 2008) is a Brazilian racing driver who is set to compete with Full Time Sports for both NASCAR Brasil and Stock Car Pro Series.

== Early life ==
Alfredo Vieira Ibiapina Filho born in Curitiba, Paraná, and is the son of Alfredo Ibiapina and Iana Freitas Chaves. He moved to Florianópolis, Santa Catarina, at age of five. His father, Alfredo, is a former racing driver. Alfredinho was inspired by the character Lightning McQueen from the Pixar movie Cars to become a race car driver. He is also an admirer of Lewis Hamilton, seven-time Formula One champion.

== Career ==
=== Karting ===
Ibiapina began participating in kart championships at the age of nine. He was the Brazilian champion in the OK Junior class in 2022, and in the Shifter class in 2025. He was also the Brazilian Open Kart champion, runner-up in the Brazilian Kart Cup, runner-up in the South Brazilian championships in the Cadet and Junior Minor categories, and runner-up in the 2024 Brazilian Shifter Graduates Championship.

=== Formula Delta ===
Ibipaina debuted in Formula Delta in 2023 after moving from karting with 15 years old. He won the race in the penultimate round in Goiânia, scoring pole position with a track record.

=== Stock Series ===
In 2024, Ibiapina moved to Stock Light with W2 ProGP, changing from formula racing to touring car racing. In his debut year, he got one win, one fastest lap and two podiums ending the season with a sixth position overall. Following 2025, he stayed with W2 Pro GP for a second season in the series, getting three wins, two pole positions, four fastest laps and three podiums, ending with an fourth place in the standings and finishing his participation in the series.

=== NASCAR Brasil Series ===
In 2025, Ibiapina announced his participation in NASCAR Brasil Series with Full Time Sports, being the youngest driver of the grid. In his debut year, he finished eighth in general standings but as runner-up in the "Challenge" sub-championship, losing to Jorge Martelli. Through the season, he achieved one win and one podium and was considered the series "Rookie of the year". As well, he won the "Driver Development Experience", a NASCAR Driver Development Program only for NASCAR Brasil drivers, and was rewarded with six rounds driving an Pro late model in United States. For 2026, he will stay with Full Time Sports at NASCAR Brasil.

=== Stock Car Pro Series ===
In February 25, Ibiapina was announced in Stock Car Pro Series driving the Full Time Sports' Toyota Corolla Cross, which will be his debut in the series.

== Racing Record ==
Season	Series	Team	Races	Wins	Poles	F/Laps	Podiums	Points	Position
2023	Formula Delta		?	?	?	?	?	?	?
2024	Stock Series	W2 ProGP	18	1	0	1	2	244	6th
2025	NASCAR Brasil Series	Full Time Sports	21	1	0	0	1	172	8th
2025	Stock Light	W2 ProGP	18	3	2	4	3	252	4th
2026	NASCAR Brasil Series	Full Time Sports							
2026	Stock Car Pro Series	Full Time Sports							
