= Caibi =

- Municipality
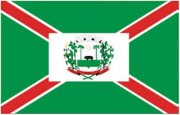
- Flag Coat of arms

- Caibi in Santa Catarina

- Location of Caibi in Brazil
- Coordinates: 27°04′19″S 53°14′52″W
- Country: Brazil
- Region: South
- State: Santa Catarina
- Mesoregion: Oeste Catarinense

Government
  - Mayor: Dilair Menin

Area
  - Total: 67.51 sq mi (174.84 km^{2})

Population (2020)
  - Total: 6,130
  - Density: 92.1/sq mi (35.57/km^{2})
- Time zone: UTC -3

Caibi is a municipality in the state of Santa Catarina in the South region of Brazil. It covers 174.84 km^{2} (67.51 mi^{2}), and has a population of 6,130 with a population density of 35.57 inhabitants per square kilometer.

Caibi was settled in two waves. The first, in 1926, were settlers were gauchos from the municipality of Guaporé in the state of Rio Grande do Sul. The second, in 1930, were ethnic Germans from Siberia brought to the region by the Companhia Colonizadora Sul Brasil. The second group were refugees of First World War and sought new land to avoid the war. Many of the group desired to return to Paraná, but settled in the area permanently due to the difficulty of the voyage from Siberia. The German residents were unaccustomed to the food and climate of southern Brazil. Other settlers came to the area in the early part of the 20th century. In 1964 Caibi, a district of Palmitos, became a separate municipality.

== See also ==
- List of municipalities in Santa Catarina
