= Arthur Gama =

Brazilian racing driver (born 2005)

- Nationality: Brazilian
- Born: 24 May 2005 (age 21) Porto Alegre, Rio Grande do Sul

Previous series
- 2025 2023–2024: Stock Car Pro Series; Stock Series

Championship titles
- 2022 2024: GT Sprint Race - ProAm; Stock Series

Awards
- 2022 2023: GT Sprint Race - Rookie of the Year; Stock Series - Rookie of the Year

Arthur Gama (born 24 May 2005) is a Brazilian auto racing driver who competes in the NASCAR Brasil Sprint Race, where he won the Pro Am championship and was the Rookie of the Year in 2022. He previously competed in the Stock Car Pro Series for TGR Full Time Sports and the Stock Series, where he won the 2024 championship.

== Career ==
=== NASCAR Brasil Series ===
Gama competed in GT Sprint Race in 2022, winning the Pro Am Championship. The GT Sprint Race was renamed NASCAR Brasil Sprint Race the following year, and in that season, he finished in third place in the Pro category and ninth overall.

After a two year absence, Gama returned to the NASCAR Brasil Series in 2026, competing for Cavaleiro Sports.

=== Stock Series ===
Gama entered the Stock Series in 2023, where he finished in third place, winning two races and the rookie championship with 306 points. The following season, he was signed by Artcon Racing. In the final round of the season, Gama won the first race. The following day, he finished in second place in the second race of the final round, clinching the driver's championship. In the third and final race, he won his ninth and final race and finished the season with six poles, 15 podiums and 415 points.

=== Stock Car Pro Series ===
In March 2025, Gama was signed by TGR Full Time Sports. He won his first Stock Car race at the sprint race at the Cascavel round.

== Racing record ==
=== Racing career summary ===
Season	Series	Team	Races	Wins	Poles	F.Laps	Podiums	Points	Position
2022	Turismo 1.4 Brasil - A	N/A	16	0	0	0	2	113	11th
2022	GT Sprint Race Brasil - Pro Am	N/A	10	5	2	2	8	237	1st
2022	GT Sprint Race Special Edition - Pro Am	N/A	9	3	1	0	5	165	2nd
2022	Campeonato Gaúcho de Endurance - P3	LT Team	1	0	0	0	0	?	?
2023	Stock Series	Garra Racing	18	2	0	1	8	306	3rd
2023	NASCAR Brasil Sprint Race	N/A	12	2	1	1	7	192	9th
2023	Império Endurance Brasil - P1	Motorcar Racing	3	0	2	0	1	?	?
2024	Stock Series	Artcon Racing	18	9	6	4	15	192	1st
