= Zezinho Muggiati =

Racing driver from Brazil

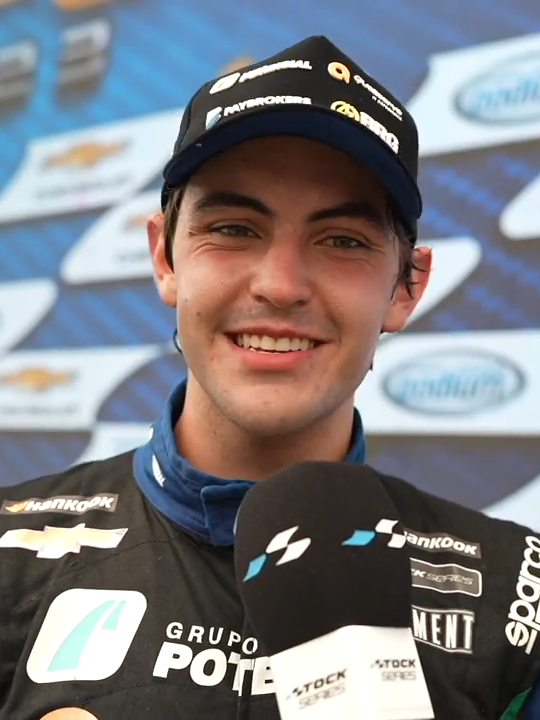
- Muggiati in 2023
- Nationality: Brazilian
- Born: José Luiz Osti Muggiati Neto; 9 May 2003 (age 23) Curitiba, Paraná, Brazil

Stock Car Pro Series
- Years active: 2024
- Teams: KTF Racing
- Starts: 2
- Wins: 0
- Poles: 0
- Fastest laps: 0

Previous series
- 2020–2023 2019: Stock Series; Italian F4 Championship

Championship titles
- 2023: Stock Series

José Luiz Osti "Zezinho" Muggiati Neto (born 9 May 2003 in Curitiba) is a racing driver from Brazil. Muggiati is the 2023 Stock Series champion and currently competes in the Stock Car Pro Series.

== Karting record ==
=== Karting career summary ===
Season	Series	Team	Position
2012	.15º Campeonato Sulbrasileiro de Kart - PCK/Cadete		4th
2013	16th Campeonato Sulbrasileiro de Kart - PCKS/Super Cadete		4th
2013	16º Campeonato Sulbrasileiro de Kart - PCK/Cadete		1st
2013	15ª Copa Brasil de Kart - Cadete		10th
2014	16th Copa Brasil de Kart - Júnior Menor		1st
2016	SKUSA SuperNationals XX - X30 Junior	NFSports	39th

== Racing record ==
=== Racing career summary ===
Season	Series	Team	Races	Wins	Poles	F.Laps	Podiums	Points	Position
2019	Italian F4 Championship	Cram Motorsport	3	0	0	0	0	0	39th
2020	Stock Light Brasil	Carlos Alves Competições	12	1	0	1	1	150	8th
2021	GP Brasil de F4	?	?	?	?	?	?	?	?
2021	GT Sprint Race Brasil - Pro Am	?	2	0	0	0	0	26	9th
2021	GT Sprint Race Special Edition - Pro	?	3	1	0	0	1	55	12th
2021	GT Sprint Race Special Edition - Pro Am	?	3	0	0	0	0	0	?
2021	Stock Light Brasil	W2 ProGP	16	0	0	0	5	229	6th
2022	Stock Car Pro Series	Scuderia Chiarelli	1	0	0	0	0	0	NC†
2022	Stock Series	W2 ProGP	16	3	2	0	15	336	2nd
2023	Império Endurance Brasil - P1	Mottin Racing	1	0	0	0	0	0	NC
2023	Stock Series	W2 ProGP	18	7	6	7	14	384	1st
2024	Stock Car Pro Series	KTF Racing	24	0	0	0	1	416	22nd
2024	NASCAR Brasil Challenge	Maxxon Racing	3	0	0	0	0	29	21st

^{†} As Muggiati was guest driver, he was ineligible for points.

=== Complete Italian F4 Championship results ===
(key) (Races in bold indicate pole position) (Races in italics indicate fastest lap)

Year	Team	1	2	3	4	5	6	7	8	9	10	11	12	13	14	15	16	17	18	19	20	21	22	Pos	Points
2019	Cram Motorsport	VLL; 1	VLL; 2	VLL; 3	MIS; 1	MIS; 2	MIS; 3	HUN; 1	HUN; 2	HUN; 3	RBR; 1	RBR; 2	RBR; 3	IMO; 1	IMO; 2	IMO; 3	IMO; 4	MUG; 1	MUG; 2	MUG; 3	MNZ; 1; 27	MNZ; 2; 23	MNZ; 3; 18	39th	0

=== Complete Stock Light Series results ===
(key) (Races in bold indicate pole position) (Races in italics indicate fastest lap)

Year	Team	1	2	3	4	5	6	7	8	9	10	11	12	13	14	15	16	17	18	DC	Points
2020	Carlos Alves Competições	GOI1; 1 Ret	GOI1; 2 Ret	INT1; 1; 1	INT1; 2; 10	LON; 1; 7	LON; 2; 10	MOG; 1; 9	MOG; 2 Ret	GOI2; 1; 12	GOI2; 2; 5	INT1; 1; 4	INT1; 2; 7							8th	150
2021	W2 ProGP	GOI; 1; 4	GOI; 2; 4	INT1; 1; 3	INT1; 2 Ret	MOG1; 1; 3	MOG1; 2; 9	CUR1; 1; 4	CUR1; 2; 6	CUR2; 1; 3	CUR2; 2; 8	MOG2; 1; 6	MOG2; 2; 2	SAN; 1; 3	SAN; 2 DSQ	INT1; 1; 9	INT1; 2; 10			6th	229
2022	W2 ProGP	GOI1; 1; 1	GOI1; 2; 5	**NEL**; **1**; 2	NEL; 2; 3	MOG; 1; 2	MOG; 2; 3	**VLP**; **1**; 1	VLP; 2; 2	INT1; 1; 3	INT1; 2; 3	SAN; 1; 2	SAN; 2; 2	GOI2; 1; 1	GOI2; 2; 2	INT2; 1; 2	INT2; 2; 2			2nd	336
2023	W2 ProGP	**INT1**; **1**; 1	**INT1**; **2**; 1	INT1; 3; 1	TAR; 1; 4	TAR; 2; 2	TAR; 3; 9	CAS; 1; 3	CAS; 2; 3	CAS; 3; 3	**VLP**; **1**; 1	**VLP**; **2**; 1	VLP; 3; 9	MOG; 1; 1	MOG; 2; 2	MOG; 3; 2	**INT2**; **1**; 1	**INT2**; **2**; 3	INT2; 3; 11	1st	384

=== Complete Stock Car Brasil results ===
(key) (Races in bold indicate pole position) (Races in italics indicate fastest lap)

Year	Team	Car	1	2	3	4	5	6	7	8	9	10	11	12	13	14	15	16	17	18	19	20	21	22	23	24	25	Rank	Points
2022	Scuderia Chiarelli	Toyota Corolla	INT; 16	GOI; 1	GOI; 2	RIO; 1	RIO; 2	VCA; 1	VCA; 2	BRA; 1	BRA; 2	BRA; 1	BRA; 2	INT; 1	INT; 2	SCZ; 1	SCZ; 2	VCA; 1	VCA; 2	GOI; 1	GOI; 2	GOI; 1	GOI; 2	BRA; 1	BRA; 2			NC†	0
2024	KTF Racing	Chevrolet Cruze	GOI; 1; 7	GOI; 2; 17	VCA; 1 Ret	VCA; 2 C	INT; 1; 16	INT; 2; 28	CAS; 1 Ret	CAS; 2 Ret	VCA; 1; 22	VCA; 2; 15	VCA; 3; 22	GOI; 1 Ret	GOI; 2; 6	BLH; 1; 21	BLH; 2; 20	VEL; 1; 3	VEL; 2; 18	BUE; 1; 6	BUE; 2; 18	URU; 1; 19	URU; 2; 12	GOI; 1; 20	GOI; 2; 8	INT; 1; 13	INT; 2; 12	21st	472
2025	Sterling Racing	Toyota Corolla Cross	INT; 1; 18	CAS; 1; 6	CAS; 2; 14	VEL; 1 Ret	VEL; 2; 19	VCA; 1	VCA; 2	VCA; 1	VCA; 2	BLH; 1	BLH; 2	CAS; 1	CAS; 2	VCA; 1	VCA; 2	TBA; 1	TBA; 2	GOI; 1	GOI; 2	BRA; 1	BRA; 2	INT; 1	INT; 2			20th*	81*

^{†} As Muggiati was guest driver, he was ineligible for points.

^{*} Season still in progress.
