= W2 ProGP =

Brazilian auto racing team

(Brazil) W2 ProGP
- Founded: 2005
- Team principal(s): Duda Pamplona; Serafin Júnior
- Current series: TCR South America; Stock Series
- Current drivers: TCR South America; 28. Galid Osman; 77. Raphael Reis
- Drivers' Championships: TCR South America; 2021. Pepe Oriola; Stock Light; 2022. Vitor Baptista; 2023. Zezinho Muggiati
- Website: http://www.cimedracing.com/

W2 ProGP (previously called Pamplona's Motorsport and ProGP) is a Brazilian auto racing team based in Petropolis, Rio de Janeiro. It currently competes in TCR South America.

The team was created in 2005 by Brazilian racing driver Duda Pamplona. In 2021 the team started a partnership with W2 Racing by Serafin Júnior and changed its name to W2 ProGP.

== Timeline ==
Current series
Stock Car Pro Series	2005–2018
Stock Light	2021–present
TCR South America	2021–present
