= SG28 Racing =

Brazilian racing team

(Brazil) SG28 Racing
- Founded: 2018
- Nation: Brazil
- Base: Curitiba, Paraná, Brazil
- Team principal(s): Edson Ricarte; Carlos SG
- Current series: Stock Series
- Website: https://www.grandepremio.com.br/equipe/stock-car/2022/rkl-competicoes/

SG28 Racing is a Brazilian professional auto racing team based in Curitiba, Paraná. currently competes in Stock Series.
