= 2025 Stock Car Pro Series =

Season of stock car racing

The 2025 Stock Car Pro Series was the 47th season of the Stock Car Pro Series, the premier touring car racing series in South America, and the fourth season under the Stock Car Pro Series moniker. Gabriel Casagrande was the defending champion. The season started on 4 May at the Interlagos Circuit in São Paulo and finished in the same location on 14 December. Felipe Frage was the 2025 Champion.

For the 2025 season, the series ran with a new generation of cars coming to replace the old JL G-09, resulting in big changes for the series as a switch to a Crossover SUV-based formula, as well a change from V8 engines to a straight-four, turbocharged engine, being around 200 kg lighter with 500 hp, a new aero package as well with the SUV-based body, a DRS system, a brand new tubular chassis made by ArcelorMittal, a new electronics system by FuelTech company and a 5G internet connection package. The new chassis received the name Audacetech SNG01.

Focusing in the Brazilian passenger vehicle sales, the Chevrolet Tracker and Toyota Corolla Cross SUVs replaced the Toyota Corolla and Chevrolet Cruze sedans whilst Mitsubishi returned to the category with the Eclipse Cross.

== Calendar ==
The calendar for the 2025 season was revealed on 16 January 2025, and consisted of 12 rounds with a "sprint" and "feature" race each, making 24 races in total. On 13 June, the first Velo Città round was postponed to the end of September. In July, the round at Circuito Toninho da Matta was cancelled and replaced with the round at Circuito dos Cristais on the same date. In August, it was announced that the series would return to Autódromo Internacional Orlando Moura after 2019 and the round at Goiânia was cancelled due to the renovation works at the circuit. In October, it was announced that a newly built circuit in Cuiabá replaced the Goiânia round.

Round	Circuit (Event)	Dates	Map
1	(São Paulo (state)) Autódromo José Carlos Pace; São Paulo, São Paulo	3–4 May	2025 Stock Car Pro Series is located in Brazil
2	(Paraná (state)) Autódromo Internacional de Cascavel; Cascavel, Paraná	24–25 May	2025 Stock Car Pro Series is located in Brazil
3	Velopark; Nova Santa Rita, Rio Grande do Sul	7–8 June	2025 Stock Car Pro Series is located in Brazil
4	(São Paulo (state)) Autódromo Velo Città; Mogi Guaçu, São Paulo	19–20 July	2025 Stock Car Pro Series is located in Brazil
5	Circuito dos Cristais; Curvelo, Minas Gerais	16–17 August	2025 Stock Car Pro Series is located in Brazil
6	(Paraná (state)) Autódromo Internacional de Cascavel; Cascavel, Paraná	6–7 September	2025 Stock Car Pro Series is located in Brazil
7	(São Paulo (state)) Autódromo Velo Città; Mogi Guaçu, São Paulo	27–28 September	2025 Stock Car Pro Series is located in Brazil
8	(São Paulo (state)) Autódromo Velo Città; Mogi Guaçu, São Paulo	4–5 October	2025 Stock Car Pro Series is located in Brazil
9	Autódromo Internacional Orlando Moura; Campo Grande, Mato Grosso do Sul	25–26 October	2025 Stock Car Pro Series is located in Brazil
10	Autódromo Internacional de Mato Grosso; Cuiabá, Mato Grosso	14–15 November	2025 Stock Car Pro Series is located in Brazil
11	(Federal District (Brazil)) Autódromo Internacional de Brasília; Brasília, Distrito Federal	29–30 November	2025 Stock Car Pro Series is located in Brazil
12	(São Paulo (state)) Autódromo José Carlos Pace (Super Final); São Paulo, São Paulo	13–14 December	2025 Stock Car Pro Series is located in Brazil

== Teams and drivers ==
Championship entries
Team	Car	No.	Drivers	Rounds
Scuderia Chiarelli	Chevrolet Tracker	0	Cacá Bueno	All
Scuderia Chiarelli	Chevrolet Tracker	95	Lucas Kohl	All
Crown Racing	Toyota Corolla Cross	4	Júlio Campos	All
Crown Racing	Toyota Corolla Cross	81	Arthur Leist	All
Full Time Cavaleiro	Toyota Corolla Cross	5	Denis Navarro	All
Full Time Cavaleiro	Toyota Corolla Cross	111	Rubens Barrichello	1–6, 8–12
Full Time Gazoo Racing	Toyota Corolla Cross	7	João Paulo de Oliveira	1–11
Full Time Gazoo Racing	Toyota Corolla Cross	9	Arthur Gama	All
Full Time Gazoo Racing	Toyota Corolla Cross	72	Antonella Bassani	7, 12
AMattheis Motorsport	Chevrolet Tracker	6	Helio Castroneves	1, 3–12
TMG Racing	Chevrolet Tracker	8	Rafael Suzuki	All
TMG Racing	Chevrolet Tracker	19	Felipe Massa	All
RCM Motorsport	Mitsubishi Eclipse Cross	10	Ricardo Zonta	All
RCM Motorsport	Mitsubishi Eclipse Cross	17	Marcos Regadas	12
RCM Motorsport	Mitsubishi Eclipse Cross	44	Bruno Baptista	1–11
Eurofarma RC	Mitsubishi Eclipse Cross	11	Gaetano di Mauro	All
Eurofarma RC	Mitsubishi Eclipse Cross	88	Felipe Fraga (Note: Fraga is Russian-Brazilian, but he compete under Brazilian licences as Russian national emblems were banned by the FIA following the Russian invasion of Ukraine.)	All
AMattheis Vogel	Chevrolet Tracker	12	Lucas Foresti	All
AMattheis Vogel	Chevrolet Tracker	83	Gabriel Casagrande	All
Blau Motorsport	Mitsubishi Eclipse Cross	18	Allam Khodair	All
Blau Motorsport	Mitsubishi Eclipse Cross	29	Daniel Serra	All
Scuderia Bandeiras	Chevrolet Tracker	28	Enzo Elias	All
Scuderia Bandeiras	Chevrolet Tracker	51	Átila Abreu	All
Scuderia Bandeiras Sports	Mitsubishi Eclipse Cross	33	Nelson Piquet Jr.	All
Scuderia Bandeiras Sports	Mitsubishi Eclipse Cross	444	Vicente Orige	All
Cavaleiro Valda	Chevrolet Tracker	85	Guilherme Salas	All
Cavaleiro Valda	Chevrolet Tracker	90	Ricardo Maurício	All
Ipiranga Racing	Toyota Corolla Cross	21	Thiago Camilo	All
Ipiranga Racing	Toyota Corolla Cross	30	César Ramos	All
CAR Racing	Toyota Corolla Cross	38	Zezinho Muggiati	All
CAR Racing	Toyota Corolla Cross	301	Rafa Reis	All
Sterling Racing	Mitsubishi Eclipse Cross	101	Gianluca Petecof	All
Sterling Racing	Mitsubishi Eclipse Cross	121	Felipe Baptista	All

=== Team changes ===
Scuderia Bandeiras was a brand new team created by Átila Abreu and debuted in the 2025 season. The team's original plan was to run two cars for the season, but it changed to four after occupying the spot of Woking Garra, which left Stock Car Pro Series after the 2024 season.

Full Time Sports and Cavaleiro Sports merged and created a new team called Full Time Cavaleiro, where each team separately ran their additional entry.

R.Mattheis left the series after the 2024 season, and their main title sponsor Blau Farmacêutica switched to Pole Motorsports. Because of that, the team entry was changed to Blau Motorsport.

KTF Sports and a Brazilian kart team Car Racing joined forces and created a new team called Car Racing KTF, which ran four cars.

== Results and standings ==
=== Season summary ===
Round		Circuit	Date	Pole position	Fastest lap	Winning driver	Winning team
1	R1	(São Paulo (state)) Interlagos	3–4 May	(Brazil) Felipe Fraga	(Brazil) Gaetano di Mauro	(Brazil) Felipe Fraga	Eurofarma RC
2	R1	(Paraná (state)) Cascavel	24–25 May		(Brazil) Enzo Elias	(Brazil) Gianluca Petecof	CAR Racing KTF
2	R2	(Paraná (state)) Cascavel	24–25 May	(Brazil) Felipe Fraga	(Brazil) Allam Khodair	(Brazil) Allam Khodair	Blau Motorsport
3	R1	(Rio Grande do Sul) Velopark	7–8 June		(Brazil) Gaetano di Mauro	(Brazil) Gaetano di Mauro	Eurofarma RC
3	R2	(Rio Grande do Sul) Velopark	7–8 June	(Brazil) Guilherme Salas	(Brazil) Guilherme Salas	(Brazil) Guilherme Salas	Cavaleiro Valda
4	R1	(São Paulo (state)) Velo Città	19–20 July		(Brazil) Enzo Elias	(Brazil) Enzo Elias	Scuderia Bandeiras
4	R2	(São Paulo (state)) Velo Città	19–20 July	(Brazil) Felipe Baptista	(Brazil) Gaetano di Mauro	(Brazil) Nelson Piquet Jr.	Scuderia Bandeiras
5	R1	(Minas Gerais) Curvelo	16–17 August		(Brazil) Thiago Camilo	(Brazil) Gaetano di Mauro	Eurofarma RC
5	R2	(Minas Gerais) Curvelo	16–17 August	(Brazil) César Ramos	(Brazil) Enzo Elias	(Brazil) César Ramos	Ipiranga Racing
6	R1	(Paraná (state)) Cascavel	6–7 September		(Brazil) Arthur Gama	(Brazil) Arthur Gama	Full Time Gazoo Racing
6	R2	(Paraná (state)) Cascavel	6–7 September	(Brazil) Gaetano di Mauro	(Brazil) Gaetano di Mauro	(Brazil) Gaetano di Mauro	Eurofarma RC
7	R1	(São Paulo (state)) Velo Città	27–28 September		(Brazil) Gianluca Petecof	(Brazil) Gianluca Petecof	CAR Racing KTF
7	R2	(São Paulo (state)) Velo Città	27–28 September	(Brazil) Arthur Leist	(Brazil) Arthur Leist	(Brazil) Guilherme Salas	Cavaleiro Valda
8	R1	(São Paulo (state)) Velo Città	4–5 October		(Brazil) Arthur Leist	(Brazil) Arthur Leist	Crown Racing
8	R2	(São Paulo (state)) Velo Città	4–5 October	(Brazil) Rafael Suzuki	(Brazil) Arthur Leist	(Brazil) Rafael Suzuki	TMG Racing
9	R1	(Mato Grosso do Sul) Campo Grande	25–26 October		(Brazil) Allam Khodair	(Brazil) Gaetano di Mauro	Eurofarma RC
9	R2	(Mato Grosso do Sul) Campo Grande	25–26 October	(Brazil) Thiago Camilo	(Brazil) Allam Khodair	(Brazil) Thiago Camilo	Ipiranga Racing
10	R1	(Mato Grosso) Cuiabá	14–15 November		(Brazil) Arthur Leist	(Brazil) Ricardo Maurício	Cavaleiro Valda
10	R2	(Mato Grosso) Cuiabá	14–15 November	(Brazil) Felipe Massa	(Brazil) Allam Khodair	(Brazil) Ricardo Maurício	Cavaleiro Valda
11	R1	(Federal District (Brazil)) Brasília	29–30 November		(Brazil) Felipe Fraga (Note: Ricardo Zonta initially set the fastest lap, but was disqualified due to failing to make a pitstop during the race. Fraga, who originally set the fourth fastest lap, had the fastest lap for a driver that wasn't disqualified.)	(Brazil) Felipe Fraga (Note: Ricardo Zonta initially won the race, but was disqualified due to failing to make a pitstop during the race. Fraga, who originally finished 10th, was the highest finisher among the drivers that weren't disqualified.)	Eurofarma RC
11	R2	(Federal District (Brazil)) Brasília	29–30 November	(Brazil) Nelson Piquet Jr.	(Brazil) Rubens Barrichello	(Brazil) Nelson Piquet Jr.	Scuderia Bandeiras
12	R1	(São Paulo (state)) Interlagos	13–14 December		(Brazil) Felipe Fraga	(Brazil) Felipe Fraga	Eurofarma RC
12	R2	(São Paulo (state)) Interlagos	13–14 December	(Brazil) Guilherme Salas	(Brazil) Arthur Leist	(Brazil) Arthur Leist	Crown Racing

=== Championship standings ===
==== Points system ====
Points are awarded for each race at an event to the driver/s of a car that completed at least 75% of the race distance and was running at the completion of the race. The five worst results are discarded. Races in which a driver has been disqualified cannot be discarded. The first race of each event is held with partially reversed top twelve grid.

Points format	Position																														
Points format	1st	2nd	3rd	4th	5th	6th	7th	8th	9th	10th	11th	12th	13th	14th	15th	16th	17th	18th	19th	20th	21st	22nd	23rd	24th	25th	26th	27th	28th	29th	30th	Pole
Sprint Race	55	50	46	42	38	36	34	32	30	28	26	24	22	20	18	16	14	13	12	11	10	9	8	7	6	5	4	3	2	1	2
Main Race	80	74	69	64	59	55	51	47	43	40	37	34	31	28	25	22	19	17	15	13	12	11	10	9	8	7	6	5	4	3	2
First Round	15	14	13	12	11	10	9	8	7	6	5	4	3	2	1	0															2

Due the delay to deliver the new car to the teams plus the lack of spare parts, the promoter of Stock Car Pro Series decided to run only one race in the first round of the championship, with a special point system, the decision for that was to give teams more free practice time in the weekend for teams and drivers.

==== Drivers' Championship (Note: Points total shown excluding the 5 lowest scores before the final round, which are dropped.) ====
Pos	Driver	(São Paulo (state)) INT1	(Paraná (state)) CSC1		(Rio Grande do Sul) VEL		(São Paulo (state)) MGG1		(Minas Gerais) CUR		(Paraná (state)) CSC2		(São Paulo (state)) MGG2		(São Paulo (state)) MGG3		(Mato Grosso do Sul) CAM		(Mato Grosso) CUI		(Federal District (Brazil)) BRA		(São Paulo (state)) INT2		Pts
Pos	Driver	M	S	M	S	M	S	M	S	M	S	M	S	M	S	M	S	M	S	M	S	M	S	M	Pts
1	(Brazil) Felipe Fraga	1	7	2	Ret	17	7	4	6	3	4	2	5	2	11	12	Ret	3	7	8	1	2	1	7	962
2	(Brazil) Gaetano di Mauro	2	2	Ret	1	5	4	2	1	22	21	1	9	3	8	Ret	1	12	5	21	Ret	10	12	8	815
3	(Brazil) Arthur Leist	17	Ret	21	3	6	5	3	14	9	29	10	10	Ret	1	6	13	4	2	22	2	24	7	1	763
4	(Brazil) Guilherme Salas	3	3	4	5	1	22	Ret	2	10	13	28	6	1	10	25	14	19	18	14	Ret	5	4	3	753
5	(Brazil) Gabriel Casagrande	Ret	4	10	DNS	24	9	18	5	26	8	4	16	4	17	2	5	5	4	12	9	Ret	9	2	730
6	(Brazil) Nelson Piquet Jr.	Ret	5	15	6	10	23	1	10	15	11	8	24	24	23	3	3	22	3	13	3	1	6	22	713
7	(Brazil) Thiago Camilo	22	15	8	10	26	Ret	7	3	6	22	4	3	8	6	23	6	1	27	23	14	20	Ret	4	668
8	(Brazil) Enzo Elias	21	11	13	12	22	1	5	11	5	10	3	Ret	17	5	8	24	7	Ret	4	DSQ	21	25	14	643
9	(Brazil) Júlio Campos	Ret	14	Ret	4	2	17	20	29	27	2	11	28	Ret	2	7	8	2	11	Ret	DSQ	4	5	26	597
10	(Brazil) Rafael Suzuki	9	18	24	21	3	28	10	18	8	7	6	8	16	9	1	27	14	20	9	DSQ	18	20	10	592
11	(Brazil) Lucas Foresti	5	17	18	7	Ret	12	6	28	7	6	24	25	Ret	13	13	12	26	25	5	DSQ	3	2	6	566
12	(Brazil) Felipe Baptista	4	8	5	16	14	2	9	7	2	30	15	7	Ret	Ret	DNS	19	25	26	Ret	10	8	16	23	520
13	(Brazil) Rubens Barrichello	10	9	12	14	12	26	8	15	14	15	27			4	4	20	11	22	19	Ret	12	Ret	5	507
14	(Brazil) Ricardo Maurício	6	13	11	22	27	11	16	19	21	24	16	19	11	15	19	7	8	1	1	DSQ	13	23	17	501
15	(Brazil) César Ramos	11	27	7	2	8	3	24	8	1	16	Ret	12	Ret	16	17	28	DNS	10	Ret	Ret	16	3	Ret	498
16	(Brazil) Átila Abreu	16	23	Ret	DNS	11	8	Ret	9	11	17	25	4	5	20	5	10	6	14	Ret	DSQ	11	13	11	493
17	(Brazil) Felipe Massa	Ret	16	22	Ret	Ret	6	Ret	4	4	20	18	22	20	19	4	11	Ret	6	11	DSQ	7	19	13	492
18	(Brazil) Allam Khodair	20	24	1	Ret	7	24	13	Ret	17	23	12	Ret	9	Ret	10	2	Ret	9	25	11	15	11	12	490
19	(Brazil) Gianluca Petecof	24	1	6	9	13	14	Ret	27	24	14	9	1	Ret	22	18	15	10	28	DNS	13	17	15	25	483
20	(Brazil) Daniel Serra	23	25	3	Ret	18	16	11	16	12	5	7	15	7	Ret	Ret	9	27	23	20	4	23	Ret	Ret	457
21	(Brazil) João Paulo de Oliveira	13	26	16	11	9	29	12	20	Ret	3	19	2	6	Ret	9	23	15	8	15	WD	WD			443
22	(Brazil) Cacá Bueno	Ret	12	23	15	4	15	22	22	13	Ret	23	13	Ret	21	15	25	9	17	3	DSQ	9	Ret	15	438
23	(Brazil) Ricardo Zonta	12	Ret	9	20	25	27	15	25	16	12	17	18	14	18	16	4	16	15	26	DSQ	6	8	9	428
24	(Brazil) Arthur Gama	Ret	21	19	18	Ret	13	19	26	Ret	1	14	17	15	14	Ret	16	13	12	10	6	14	18	20	426
25	(Brazil) Denis Navarro	7	10	17	Ret	Ret	10	14	12	25	26	Ret	21	12	12	14	Ret	24	16	7	5	25	10	Ret	388
26	(Brazil) Zezinho Muggiati	18	6	14	Ret	19	18	21	21	20	18	13	Ret	21	Ret	Ret	21	17	13	24	7	19	22	16	334
27	(Brazil) Bruno Baptista	8	28	Ret	19	21	Ret	DSQ	13	23	9	21	11	10	3	12	22	23	19	6	WD	WD			325
28	(Brazil) Rafa Reis	Ret	20	Ret	8	20	19	Ret	24	Ret	19	Ret	27	23	Ret	24	17	20	21	2	DSQ	22	14	21	257
29	(Brazil) Lucas Kohl	14	22	Ret	13	16	20	17	23	18	28	20	26	19	Ret	21	Ret	21	24	17	8	Ret	21	Ret	246
30	(Brazil) Hélio Castroneves	15			17	23	25	Ret	Ret	19	27	22	14	13	7	20	18	18	30	16	DSQ	Ret	Ret	Ret	216
31	(Brazil) Vicente Orige	19	19	20	Ret	15	21	23	17	Ret	25	26	20	22	Ret	22	26	Ret	29	18	12	Ret	17	24	210
32	(Brazil) Antonella Bassani												23	18									24	18	49
33	(Brazil) Marcos Regadas																						Ret	19	15
Pos	Driver	M	S	M	S	M	S	M	S	M	S	M	S	M	S	M	S	M	S	M	S	M	S	M	Pts
Pos	Driver	(São Paulo (state)) INT1	(Paraná (state)) CSC1		(Rio Grande do Sul) VEL		(São Paulo (state)) MGG1		(Minas Gerais) CUR		(Paraná (state)) CSC2		(São Paulo (state)) MGG2		(São Paulo (state)) MGG3		(Mato Grosso do Sul) CAM		(Mato Grosso) CUI		(Federal District (Brazil)) BRA		(São Paulo (state)) INT2		Pts

==== Teams Championship (Note: Points total shown excluding the 5 lowest scores of the season, which are dropped.) ====
In the Teams Championship, points are awarded as the combination of points made by the team's drivers over the whole weekend.

Pos	Team	Points
1	Eurofarma RC	1630
2	Crown Racing	1329
3	A.Mattheis Vogel	1215
4	Cavaleiro Valda	1198
5	Ipiranga Racing	1103
6	Scuderia Bandeiras	1045
7	TMG Racing	1021
8	CAR Racing KTF	980
9	Blau Motorsport	933
10	Scuderia Bandeiras Sports	899
11	Full Time Cavaleiro	849
12	Full Time Gazoo Racing	848
13	RCM Motorsport	730
14	Scuderia Chiarelli	670
15	CAR Racing Sterling	567
16	AMattheis Motorsport	215

==== Manufacturer Championship ====
In the Manufacturer Championship, points are awarded as the same of the two best positioned drivers running for each manufacturer.

Pos	Manufacturer	Points
1	Mitsubishi	2475
2	Chevrolet	2360
3	Toyota	2287
