= 2026 Stock Car Pro Series =

Season of stock car racing

The 2026 Stock Car Pro Series is the 48th season of the Stock Car Pro Series, the premier touring car racing series in Brazil, and the fifth season under the Stock Car Pro Series moniker. The season will mark the return of V8 engines to the category having used inline-four turbocharged powerplants in 2025. The season was marked by the mid-season exit of the Scuderia Bandeiras team, citing parts sourcing issues and conflicts with the series regulatory body. This left stars such as Nelson Piquet Jr. and Rubens Barrichello, both frontrunners in the series at that point, without a drive.

== Calendar ==
The calendar for the 2026 season was revealed and also updated in January 2026, and will consist of 12 rounds. The calendar also marks the return of Corrida do Milhão for the first time since 2020 and the Corrida Endurance since 2022.

Round	Circuit (Event)	Dates	Support bill	Map
1	Circuito dos Cristais; Curvelo, Minas Gerais	6–8 March	TCR South America Touring Car Championship; TCR Brazil Touring Car Championship	2026 Stock Car Pro Series is located in Brazil
2	(Paraná (state)) Autódromo Internacional de Cascavel; Cascavel, Paraná	27–29 March	TCR South America Touring Car Championship; TCR Brazil Touring Car Championship; Turismo Nacional BR	2026 Stock Car Pro Series is located in Brazil
3	(São Paulo (state)) Autódromo José Carlos Pace; São Paulo, São Paulo	24–26 April	TCR South America Touring Car Championship; TCR Brazil Touring Car Championship; Stock Light; F4 Brazilian Championship	2026 Stock Car Pro Series is located in Brazil
4	(Goiás) Autódromo Internacional Ayrton Senna (GP Chevrolet Sonic); Goiânia, GO	15–17 May	Stock Light; Turismo Nacional BR	2026 Stock Car Pro Series is located in Brazil
5	Autódromo Internacional de Mato Grosso (Night Race); Cuiabá, Mato Grosso	19–20 June	TCR South America Touring Car Championship; TCR Brazil Touring Car Championship; Stock Light; Turismo Nacional BR	2026 Stock Car Pro Series is located in Brazil
6	(São Paulo (state)) Autódromo Velo Città; Mogi Guaçu, São Paulo	24–26 July	TCR South America Touring Car Championship; TCR Brazil Touring Car Championship; Stock Light; F4 Brazilian Championship	2026 Stock Car Pro Series is located in Brazil
7	Autódromo Internacional de Santa Cruz do Sul; Santa Cruz do Sul, Rio Grande do Sul	7–9 August	Turismo Nacional BR	2026 Stock Car Pro Series is located in Brazil
8	Circuito dos Cristais; Curvelo, Minas Gerais	4–6 September	Stock Light; Turismo Nacional BR	2026 Stock Car Pro Series is located in Brazil
9	(Federal District (Brazil)) Autódromo Internacional de Brasília (Corrida Endurance); Brasília, Distrito Federal	25–27 September	Stock Light; F4 Brazilian Championship; Turismo Nacional BR	2026 Stock Car Pro Series is located in Brazil
10	(Paraná (state)) Autódromo Internacional de Cascavel; Cascavel, Paraná	16–18 October	F4 Brazilian Championship	2026 Stock Car Pro Series is located in Brazil
11	Velopark (Corrida do Milhão); Nova Santa Rita, Rio Grande do Sul	13–15 November	Turismo Nacional BR	2026 Stock Car Pro Series is located in Brazil
12	(São Paulo (state)) Autódromo José Carlos Pace (Super Final); São Paulo, São Paulo	11–13 December	Stock Light; F4 Brazilian Championship; Turismo Nacional BR	2026 Stock Car Pro Series is located in Brazil

== Teams and drivers ==
Championship entries					Endurance entries
Team	Car	No.	Drivers	Rounds	Co-driver name
Scuderia Chiarelli	Chevrolet Tracker	0	(Brazil) Cacá Bueno	1–9	(Brazil) Sergio Ramalho
Scuderia Chiarelli	Chevrolet Tracker	22	(Brazil) André Moraes Jr.	1–9	(Brazil) André Negrão
Time Lubrax TMG	Chevrolet Tracker	4	(Brazil) Júlio Campos	1–9	(Brazil) Antonio Pizzonia
Time Lubrax TMG	Chevrolet Tracker	19	(Brazil) Felipe Massa	1–9	(Brazil) Caio Collet
Scuderia Bandeiras	Chevrolet Tracker	8	(Brazil) Rafael Suzuki	1–5	
Scuderia Bandeiras	Chevrolet Tracker	33	(Brazil) Nelson Piquet Jr.	1–5	
Full Time Sports	Chevrolet Tracker	8	(Brazil) Rafael Suzuki	6–9	(Brazil) Nelson Piquet Jr.
AMattheis Vogel	Chevrolet Tracker	12	(Brazil) Lucas Foresti	1–9	(Brazil) Rafael Martins
AMattheis Vogel	Chevrolet Tracker	83	(Brazil) Gabriel Casagrande	1–9	(Brazil) Gabriel Robe
Valda Cavaleiro Sports	Chevrolet Tracker	85	(Brazil) Guilherme Salas	1–9	(Brazil) Arthur Gama
Valda Cavaleiro Sports	Chevrolet Tracker	90	(Brazil) Ricardo Maurício	1–9	(Brazil) Denis Navarro
Eurofarma RC	Mitsubishi Eclipse Cross	1	(Brazil) Felipe Fraga	1–9	(Brazil) Felipe Nasr
Eurofarma RC	Mitsubishi Eclipse Cross	11	(Brazil) Gaetano di Mauro	1–9	(Brazil) Felipe Drugovich
RCM Motorsport	Mitsubishi Eclipse Cross	7	(Brazil) Sérgio Sette Câmara	1–9	(Brazil) Lucas di Grassi
RCM Motorsport	Mitsubishi Eclipse Cross	38	(Brazil) Zezinho Muggiati	1–9	(Brazil) Dennis Dirani
Blau Motorsport	Mitsubishi Eclipse Cross	18	(Brazil) Allam Khodair	1–9	(Brazil) Diego Nunes
Blau Motorsport	Mitsubishi Eclipse Cross	29	(Brazil) Daniel Serra	1–9	(Brazil) Marcos Gomes
SG28 Powered RTR	Mitsubishi Eclipse Cross	24	(Brazil) Felipe Barrichello Bartz	1	
Albatroz Racing	Mitsubishi Eclipse Cross	24	(Brazil) Felipe Barrichello Bartz	3–9	(Brazil) Enzo Bedani
Scuderia Bandeiras Sports	Mitsubishi Eclipse Cross	51	(Brazil) Átila Abreu	1–5	
Scuderia Bandeiras Sports	Mitsubishi Eclipse Cross	111	(Brazil) Rubens Barrichello	1–5	
Full Time Sports	Mitsubishi Eclipse Cross	111	(Brazil) Rubens Barrichello	9	(Brazil) Fernando Barrichello
Sterling Racing	Mitsubishi Eclipse Cross	121	(Brazil) Felipe Baptista	1–9	(Brazil) Vitor Baptista
Sterling Racing	Mitsubishi Eclipse Cross	444	(Brazil) Vicente Orige	1–9	(Brazil) Jeff Giasi
Mercado Livre Racing	Toyota Corolla Cross	06	(Brazil) Hélio Castroneves	1–3, 5–9	(Brazil) Daniel Molzoni
Mercado Livre Racing	Toyota Corolla Cross	30	(Brazil) César Ramos	1–9	(Brazil) Nicolas Costa
Mercado Livre Racing	Toyota Corolla Cross	54	(Brazil) Caio Chaves	4	
TMG AMattheis	Toyota Corolla Cross	27	(Brazil) Renan Guerra	1–9	(Brazil) William Freire
TMG AMattheis	Toyota Corolla Cross	73	(Brazil) Enzo Elias	1–9	(Brazil) Gianluca Petecof
Full Time Gazoo Racing	Toyota Corolla Cross	10	(Brazil) Ricardo Zonta	1–4, 6–9	(Brazil) Antonella Bassani
Full Time Gazoo Racing	Toyota Corolla Cross	72	(Brazil) Antonella Bassani	5	
Full Time Gazoo Racing	Toyota Corolla Cross	80	(Brazil) Alfredinho Ibiapina	1–9	(Brazil) Pedro Piquet
Mercado Livre Racing Team	Toyota Corolla Cross	21	(Brazil) Thiago Camilo	1–9	(Brazil) Caio Chaves
SG28 by RTR	Toyota Corolla Cross	25	(Colombia) Tatiana Calderón	1	
SG28 by RTR	Toyota Corolla Cross	26	(Brazil) Rafael Martins	1	
SG28 by RTR	Toyota Corolla Cross	97	(Brazil) Bruna Tomaselli	1	
Crown Racing	Toyota Corolla Cross	81	(Brazil) Arthur Leist	1–9	(Brazil) Gabriel Koenigkan
Crown Racing	Toyota Corolla Cross	95	(Brazil) Lucas Kohl	1–9	(Brazil) Danilo Dirani
CAR Racing	Toyota Corolla Cross	293	(Brazil) Léo Reis	1–9	(Spain) Albert Costa
CAR Racing	Toyota Corolla Cross	301	(Brazil) Rafa Reis	1–9	(Brazil) Alberto Cattucci

=== Team and driver changes ===
==== Pre-season ====
The grid expanded to 31 from 34 cars. Stock Light team SG28 stepped up to the top-flight with their drivers Bruna Tomaselli and 2025 Stock Light champion Felipe Barrichello Bartz, and later added a third car for former FIA Formula 2 Championship and IndyCar Series driver Tatiana Calderón. The two female drivers were withdrawn from the opening round of the championship after their cars were delivered without the required running gear, but the two cars were later cannibalised for Rafael Martins to run in Race 2. The team decided to move to NASCAR Brasil Series.

AMattheis Motorsport expanded to four Toyotas and changed its name to Mercado Livre Racing. The team also announced a technical partnership with TMG Racing. Enzo Elias joined the team.

Stock Light runner up Léo Reis joined CAR Racing alongside his brother Rafa Reis. Vicente Orige also joined the team having left Scuderia Bandeiras; he was replaced with Rafael Suzuki.

Rubens Barrichello left Full Time Sports after 13 seasons to join Scuderia Bandeiras.

Império Endurance Brasil driver Andre Moraes Jr returned to the series in Scuderia Chiarelli alongside Cacá Bueno.

João Paulo de Oliveira left the series to focus on Nissan Super GT program.

==== Mid-season ====
On 30 June 2026, Scuderia Bandeiras announced that it would leave the Stock Car grid effective immediately after losing an appeal regarding the disqualification of Rubens Barrichello and Nelson Piquet, Jr. from the Goiânia event. In a statement, the team cited "legal uncertainty", friction with governing body VICAR, and concerns about tax issues.

== Results and standings ==
=== Season summary ===
Round		Circuit	Date	Pole position	Fastest lap	Winning driver(s)	Winning team
1	R1	(Minas Gerais) Curvelo 1	7 March		(Brazil) Felipe Fraga	(Brazil) Enzo Elias	AMattheis/TMG
1	R2	(Minas Gerais) Curvelo 1	8 March	(Brazil) Gaetano di Mauro	(Brazil) Gaetano di Mauro	(Brazil) Felipe Fraga	Eurofarma RC
2	R1	(Paraná (state)) Cascavel 1	28 March		(Brazil) Guilherme Salas	(Brazil) Guilherme Salas	Valda Cavaleiro Sports
2	R2	(Paraná (state)) Cascavel 1	29 March	(Brazil) Gaetano di Mauro	(Brazil) Nelson Piquet Jr.	(Brazil) Nelson Piquet Jr.	Scuderia Bandeiras
3	R1	(São Paulo (state)) Interlagos 1	25 April		(Brazil) Léo Reis	(Brazil) Léo Reis	CAR Racing
3	R2	(São Paulo (state)) Interlagos 1	26 April	(Brazil) Guilherme Salas	(Brazil) Felipe Baptista	(Brazil) Guilherme Salas	Valda Cavaleiro Sports
4	R1	(Goiás) Goiânia	16 May		(Brazil) Felipe Fraga	(Brazil) Felipe Fraga	Eurofarma RC
4	R2	(Goiás) Goiânia	17 May	(Brazil) Gaetano di Mauro	(Brazil) Gaetano di Mauro	(Brazil) Gaetano di Mauro	Eurofarma RC
5	R1	(Mato Grosso) Cuiabá	19 June		(Brazil) Felipe Baptista	(Brazil) Felipe Baptista	Sterling Racing
5	R2	(Mato Grosso) Cuiabá	20 June	(Brazil) Nelson Piquet Jr.	(Brazil) Felipe Massa	(Brazil) Nelson Piquet Jr.	Scuderia Bandeiras
6	R1	(São Paulo (state)) Mogi Guaçu	25 July		(Brazil) Gaetano di Mauro	(Brazil) Gaetano di Mauro	Eurofarma RC
6	R2	(São Paulo (state)) Mogi Guaçu	26 July	(Brazil) Zezinho Muggiati	(Brazil) Gaetano di Mauro	(Brazil) Felipe Baptista	Sterling Racing
7	R1	(Rio Grande do Sul) Santa Cruz do Sul	8 August		(Brazil) Felipe Baptista	(Brazil) Felipe Baptista	Sterling Racing
7	R2	(Rio Grande do Sul) Santa Cruz do Sul	9 August	(Brazil) Felipe Fraga	(Brazil) Hélio Castroneves	(Brazil) Felipe Fraga	Eurofarma RC
8	R1	(Minas Gerais) Curvelo 2	5 September		(Brazil) Arthur Leist	(Brazil) Léo Reis	CAR Racing
8	R2	(Minas Gerais) Curvelo 2	6 September	(Brazil) César Ramos	(Brazil) Guilherme Salas	(Brazil) César Ramos	Mercado Livre Racing
9		(Federal District (Brazil)) Brasília	27 September	(Brazil) Gabriel Casagrande (Brazil) Gabriel Robe	(Brazil) Guilherme Salas (Brazil) Arthur Gama	(Brazil) Sergio Sette Câmara (Brazil) Lucas di Grassi	RCM Motorsport
10	R1	(Paraná (state)) Cascavel 2	17 October		(Brazil) Ricardo Maurício	(Brazil) Felipe Fraga	Eurofarma RC
10	R2	(Paraná (state)) Cascavel 2	18 October	(Brazil) Gabriel Casagrande	(Brazil) Thiago Camilo	(Brazil) Gabriel Casagrande	AMattheis Vogel
11		(Rio Grande do Sul) Velopark	15 November	(Brazil) Gabriel Casagrande	(Brazil) Thiago Camilo	(Brazil) Felipe Baptista	Sterling Racing
12	R1	(São Paulo (state)) Interlagos 2	12 December				
12	R2	(São Paulo (state)) Interlagos 2	13 December				

=== Championship standings ===
==== Points system ====
Points are awarded for each race at an event to the driver/s of a car that completed at least 75% of the race distance and was running at the completion of the race. The five worst results are discarded. Races in which a driver has been disqualified cannot be discarded. The first race of each event is held with partially reversed top twelve grid.

Points format	Position																														
Points format	1st	2nd	3rd	4th	5th	6th	7th	8th	9th	10th	11th	12th	13th	14th	15th	16th	17th	18th	19th	20th	21st	22nd	23rd	24th	25th	26th	27th	28th	29th	30th	Pole
Sprint Race	55	50	46	42	38	36	34	32	30	28	26	24	22	20	18	16	14	13	12	11	10	9	8	7	6	5	4	3	2	1	2
Main Race	80	74	69	64	59	55	51	47	43	40	37	34	31	28	25	22	19	17	15	13	12	11	10	9	8	7	6	5	4	3	2

==== Drivers' Championship ====
A drivers' five worst results before the last round are dropped from their final score.

Pos	Driver	Team	Manufacturer	(Minas Gerais) CUR1		(Paraná (state)) CSC1		(São Paulo (state)) INT1		(Goiás) GOI		(Mato Grosso) CUI		(São Paulo (state)) MGG		(Rio Grande do Sul) SCS		(Minas Gerais) CUR2		(Federal District (Brazil)) BRA	(Paraná (state)) CSC2		(Rio Grande do Sul) VEL	(São Paulo (state)) INT2		Pts
Pos	Driver	Team	Manufacturer	S	M	S	M	S	M	S	M	S	M	S	M	S	M	S	M	E	S	M	E	S	M	Pts
1	(Brazil) Felipe Fraga	Eurofarma RC	Mitsubishi	5	1	8	4	8	3	1	19	5	2	3	2	27	1	8	24	15	1	10	8			828
2	(Brazil) Gaetano di Mauro	Eurofarma RC	Mitsubishi	Ret	Ret	Ret	3	3	9	11	1	7	Ret	1	7	26	3	4	4	10	4	Ret	4			740
3	(Brazil) Gabriel Casagrande	AMattheis Vogel	Chevrolet	6	3	5	17	7	4	5	4	4	18	16	Ret	10	5	5	9	23	9	1	5			724
4	(Brazil) Guilherme Salas	Valda Cavaleiro Sports	Chevrolet	Ret	16	1	13	6	1	16	15	12	13	Ret	6	9	22	6	2	2	3	5	6			704
5	(Brazil) Júlio Campos	TMG Racing	Chevrolet	9	2	4	25	20	5	Ret	Ret	19	Ret	7	23	2	6	9	6	5	Ret	3	2			656
6	(Brazil) Felipe Baptista	Sterling Racing	Mitsubishi	25	22	12	11	Ret	8	19	3	1	6	Ret	1	1	Ret	13	16	Ret	16	11	1			626
7	(Brazil) Sergio Sette Câmara	RCM Motorsport	Mitsubishi	7	10	15	7	22	14	12	2	3	5	8	10	19	17	11	26	1	17	21	12			601
8	(Brazil) Felipe Massa	TMG Racing	Chevrolet	11	7	9	2	13	11	4	8	2	19	23	11	7	25	21	15	Ret	5	Ret	13			597
9	(Brazil) Arthur Leist	Crown Racing	Toyota	8	17	3	8	10	5	24	Ret	22	Ret	10	3	11	4	3	Ret	8	18	17	7			597
10	(Brazil) Rafael Suzuki	Scuderia Bandeiras	Chevrolet	4	6	13	9	9	2	7	12	11	21													596
10	(Brazil) Rafael Suzuki	Full Time Racing	Chevrolet											Ret	9	Ret	19	10	5	9	6	18	14			596
11	(Brazil) Enzo Elias	AMattheis TMG	Toyota	1	9	7	5	23	27	6	7	31	23	5	Ret	14	9	7	3	18	26	4	23			583
12	(Brazil) César Ramos	Mercado Livre Racing	Toyota	Ret	19	14	23	5	6	10	6	17	Ret	14	13	5	10	12	1	20	11	7	11			562
13	(Brazil) Thiago Camilo	Mercado Livre Racing Team	Toyota	2	15	27	Ret	4	19	30	9	15	11	11	12	4	2	16	13	17	Ret	2	15			542
14	(Brazil) Léo Reis	CAR Racing	Toyota	14	8	16	10	1	Ret	14	20	9	9	22	8	Ret	Ret	1	7	Ret	8	13	10			536
15	(Brazil) Zezinho Muggiati	RCM Motorsport	Mitsubishi	DSQ	28	2	22	25	28	3	13	8	Ret	9	5	8	7	15	19	14	15	14	9			494
16	(Brazil) Daniel Serra	Blau Motorsport	Mitsubishi	10	4	Ret	Ret	DNS	15	20	22	10	3	13	24	12	13	23	12	22	2	8	18			476
17	(Brazil) Nelson Piquet Jr.	Scuderia Bandeiras	Chevrolet	12	26	6	1	DSQ	DSQ	2	11	13	1													429
17	(Brazil) Nelson Piquet Jr.	Full Time Racing	Chevrolet																	9						429
17	(Brazil) Nelson Piquet Jr.	Fittipaldi Sports	Chevrolet																				3			429
18	(Brazil) Allam Khodair	Blau Motorsport	Mitsubishi	15	11	17	14	11	10	23	23	14	Ret	4	4	18	Ret	25	Ret	4	21	24	19			415
19	(Brazil) Alfredinho Ibiapina	Full Time Gazoo Racing	Toyota	19	25	21	Ret	2	19	13	5	28	Ret	2	18	6	Ret	24	14	6	14	Ret	25			400
20	(Brazil) Cacá Bueno	Scuderia Chiarelli	Chevrolet	16	14	28	Ret	16	16	9	16	18	8	18	14	22	16	18	11	13	13	15	20			373
21	(Brazil) Ricardo Maurício	Valda Cavaleiro Sports	Chevrolet	Ret	21	20	15	27	12	21	17	23	7	Ret	20	17	14	19	8	Ret	10	6	Ret			359
22	(Brazil) Ricardo Zonta	Full Time Gazoo Racing	Toyota	20	27	18	6	14	21	15	Ret			6	16	15	12	14	21	19	23	16	16			336
23	(Brazil) Rubens Barrichello	Scuderia Bandeiras Sports	Mitsubishi	3	5	11	12	Ret	DSQ	18	10	6	4													327
23	(Brazil) Rubens Barrichello	Full Time Sports	Mitsubishi																	24						327
24	(Brazil) Lucas Foresti	AMattheis Vogel	Chevrolet	13	12	Ret	20	Ret	23	17	18	32	17	12	DSQ	13	8	Ret	Ret	16	12	12	21			321
25	(Brazil) Rafa Reis	CAR Racing	Toyota	Ret	Ret	24	24	18	24	22	24	20	14	Ret	17	16	15	2	10	3	22	19	17			317
26	(Brazil) André Moraes Jr.	Scuderia Chiarelli	Chevrolet	Ret	20	23	18	19	18	25	21	24	12	Ret	22	25	24	20	20	21	7	9	24			247
27	(Brazil) Lucas Kohl	Crown Racing	Toyota	Ret	29	19	Ret	26	25	28	26	29	22	17	15	3	11	17	23	Ret	19	23	22			232
28	(Brazil) Hélio Castroneves	Mercado Livre Racing	Toyota	21	24	26	19	15	22			21	10	19	Ret	24	18	22	22	11	25	20	Ret			230
29	(Brazil) Renan Guerra	AMattheis TMG	Toyota	22	23	22	16	12	20	Ret	Ret	25	16	15	19	20	20	26	25	Ret	20	Ret	Ret			214
30	(Brazil) Átila Abreu	Scuderia Bandeiras Sports	Mitsubishi	16	13	10	Ret	17	13	8	14	16	20													213
31	(Brazil) Vicente Orige	Sterling Racing	Mitsubishi	18	18	25	21	21	Ret	26	Ret	26	Ret	20	Ret	23	21	28	18	12	24	Ret	26			170
32	(Brazil) Felipe Barrichello Bartz	SG28 Powered RTR	Mitsubishi	23	Ret																					169
32	(Brazil) Felipe Barrichello Bartz	Albatroz Racing	Mitsubishi					24	26	29	25	30	Ret	21	21	21	23	27	17	7	27	22	Ret			169
33	(Brazil) Lucas di Grassi	RCM Motorsport	Mitsubishi																	1						80
34	(Brazil) Arthur Gama	Valda Cavaleiro Sports	Chevrolet																	2						74
35	(Brazil) Alberto Cattucci	CAR Racing	Toyota																	3						69
36	(Brazil) Diego Nunes	Blau Motorsport	Mitsubishi																	4						64
37	(Brazil) Antonio Pizzonia	TMG Racing	Chevrolet																	5						59
38	(Brazil) Pedro Piquet	Full Time Racing	Chevrolet																	6						55
39	(Brazil) Enzo Bedani	Albatroz Racing	Mitsubishi																	7						51
40	(Brazil) Gabriel Koenigkan	Crown Racing	Toyota																	8						47
41	(Brazil) Antonella Bassani	Full Time Gazoo Racing	Toyota									27	15							19						44
42	(Brazil) Felipe Drugovich	Eurofarma RC	Mitsubishi																	10						40
43	(Brazil) Daniel Molzoni	Mercado Livre Racing	Toyota																	11						37
44	(Brazil) Jeff Giasi	Sterling Racing	Mitsubishi																	12						34
45	(Brazil) Sergio Ramalho	Scuderia Chiarelli	Chevrolet																	13						31
46	(Brazil) Caio Chaves	Mercado Livre Racing	Toyota							27	27									17						29
47	(Brazil) Dennis Dirani	RCM Motorsport	Mitsubishi																	14						28
48	(Brazil) Felipe Nasr	Eurofarma RC	Mitsubishi																	15						25
49	(Brazil) Rafael Martins	SG28 by RTR	Toyota	DNS	Ret															16						22
50	(Brazil) Gianluca Petecof	AMattheis TMG	Toyota																	18						17
51	(Brazil) Nicolas Costa	Mercado Livre Racing	Toyota																	20						13
52	(Brazil) André Negrão	Scuderia Chiarelli	Chevrolet																	21						12
53	(Brazil) Gabriel Robe	AMattheis Vogel	Chevrolet																	23						12
54	(Brazil) Marcos Gomes	Blau Motorsport	Mitsubishi																	22						11
55	(Brazil) Fernando Barrichello	Full Time Sports	Mitsubishi																	24						9
	(Brazil) Denis Navarro	Valda Cavaleiro Sports	Chevrolet																	Ret						0
	(Brazil) William Freire	AMattheis TMG	Toyota																	Ret						0
	(Spain) Albert Costa	CAR Racing	Toyota																	Ret						0
	(Brazil) Vitor Baptista	Sterling Racing	Mitsubishi																	Ret						0
	(Brazil) Danilo Dirani	AMattheis Vogel	Chevrolet																	Ret						0
	(Brazil) Caio Collet	TMG Racing	Chevrolet																	Ret						0
	(Brazil) Bruna Tomaselli	SG28 by RTR	Toyota	WD	WD																					0
	(Colombia) Tatiana Calderón	SG28 by RTR	Toyota	WD	WD																					0
Pos	Driver	Team	Manufacturer	S	M	S	M	S	M	S	M	S	M	S	M	S	M	S	M	E	S	M	E	S	M	Pts
Pos	Driver	Team	Manufacturer	(Minas Gerais) CUR1		(Paraná (state)) CSC1		(São Paulo (state)) INT1		(Goiás) GOI		(Mato Grosso) CUI		(São Paulo (state)) MGG		(Rio Grande do Sul) SCS		(Minas Gerais) CUR2		(Federal District (Brazil)) BRA	(Paraná (state)) CSC2		(Rio Grande do Sul) VEL	(São Paulo (state)) INT2		Pts

==== Teams Championship (Note: Points total shown excluding the 5 lowest scores of the season, which are dropped.) ====
In the Teams Championship, points are awarded as the combination of points made by the team's drivers over the whole weekend.

Pos	Team	Points
1	Eurofarma RC	1450
2	TMG Racing	1065
3	Valda Cavaleiro Sports	1052
4	A.Mattheis Vogel	994
5	Team RC	982
6	CAR Racing	840
7	Blau Motorsport	810
8	Crown Racing	784
9	Scuderia Bandeiras	778
10	Sterling Racing	721
11	Mercado Livre Racing	719
12	Full Time Gazoo Racing	679
13	Scuderia Bandeiras Sports	595
14	Scuderia Chiarelli	586
15	A.Mattheis/TMG	583
16	Mercado Livre Racing Team	542
17	Full Time Racing	269
18	Albatroz Racing	154
19	Fittipaldi Sports	69
20	SG28 Powered RTR	11
21	Full Time Sports	9
22	SG28 by RTR	0

==== Manufacturer Championship ====
In the Manufacturer Championship, points are awarded as the sum of points from all the manufacturer cars.

Pos	Manufacturer	Points
1	Chevrolet	5276
2	Mitsubishi	5245
3	Toyota	4678
