= Stock Car Corrida Endurance =

Stock Car Brasil
- Venue: Autódromo Internacional de Brasília (2026); Autódromo José Carlos Pace (2014, 2018, 2022); Autódromo Internacional de Curitiba (2016); Autódromo Internacional Ayrton Senna (Goiânia) (2015)
- First race: 2014
- Last race: 2022
- Most wins (driver): 10 drivers (1)
- Most wins (team): Team RC, Vogel Motorsport (2)
- Most wins (manufacturer): Chevrolet (4)

The Stock Car Corrida Endurance (Stock Car Endurance Race) (formerly the Stock Car Corrida de Duplas) is a Stock Car Pro Series auto race held annually in Brazil. It was organized by Vicar Promoções Desportivas.

== History ==
Goiânia, used in 2015

Interlagos Circuit, used in 2014, 2018, 2022

Curitiba Circuit, used in 2016

The first race was held in 2014 at Autódromo José Carlos Pace and moved to Autódromo Internacional Ayrton Senna in 2015 and Curitiba in 2016. The event did not take place in 2017, returning in 2018 at Interlagos. The race will back in 2026 Stock Car Pro Series.

== International guest drivers ==
- (Italy) Alessandro Pier Guidi (2014)
- (Argentina) Juan Manuel Silva (2014)
- (Portugal) Alvaro Parente (2012)

== Results ==
Year	Driver	Manufacturer	Team	Location	Date
2014	(Brazil) Felipe Fraga (Brazil) Rodrigo Sperafico	Chevrolet	Vogel Motorsport	Interlagos (Grand Prix Circuit)	March 23
2015	(Brazil) Ricardo Mauricio (Argentina) Nestor Girolami	Chevrolet	Eurofarma RC	Goiânia (Grand Prix Circuit)	March 22
2016	(Brazil) Marcos Gomes (Brazil) Antônio Pizzonia	Peugeot	Voxx Racing	Curitiba (Grand Prix Circuit)	March 6
2017	not held				
2018	(Brazil) Daniel Serra (Brazil) João Paulo de Oliveira	Chevrolet	Eurofarma RC	Interlagos (Grand Prix Circuit)	March 10
2019–2021	not held				
2022	(Brazil) Gabriel Casagrande (Brazil) Gabriel Robe	Chevrolet	Vogel Motorsport	Interlagos (Grand Prix Circuit)	February 13
2023–2025	not held				
2026	[[Sérgio Sette Câmara| (Brazil) Sergio Sette Camara]] [[Lucas di Grassi| (Brazil) Lucas Di Grassi]]	Mitsubishi	RCM Motorsport	Brasília	
