= Léo Reis =

Brazilian racing driver (born 2006)

- Nationality: Brazilian
- Born: 29 October 2003 (age 23) São Paulo, Brazil

Leonardo França De Oliveira Reis "Léo Reis"(born 29 October 2003) is a Brazilian racing driver who is set to compete with CAR Racing in Stock Car Pro Series.His brother is Rafa Reis is also a racing driver.
