= Felipe Fraga =

Brazilian racing driver

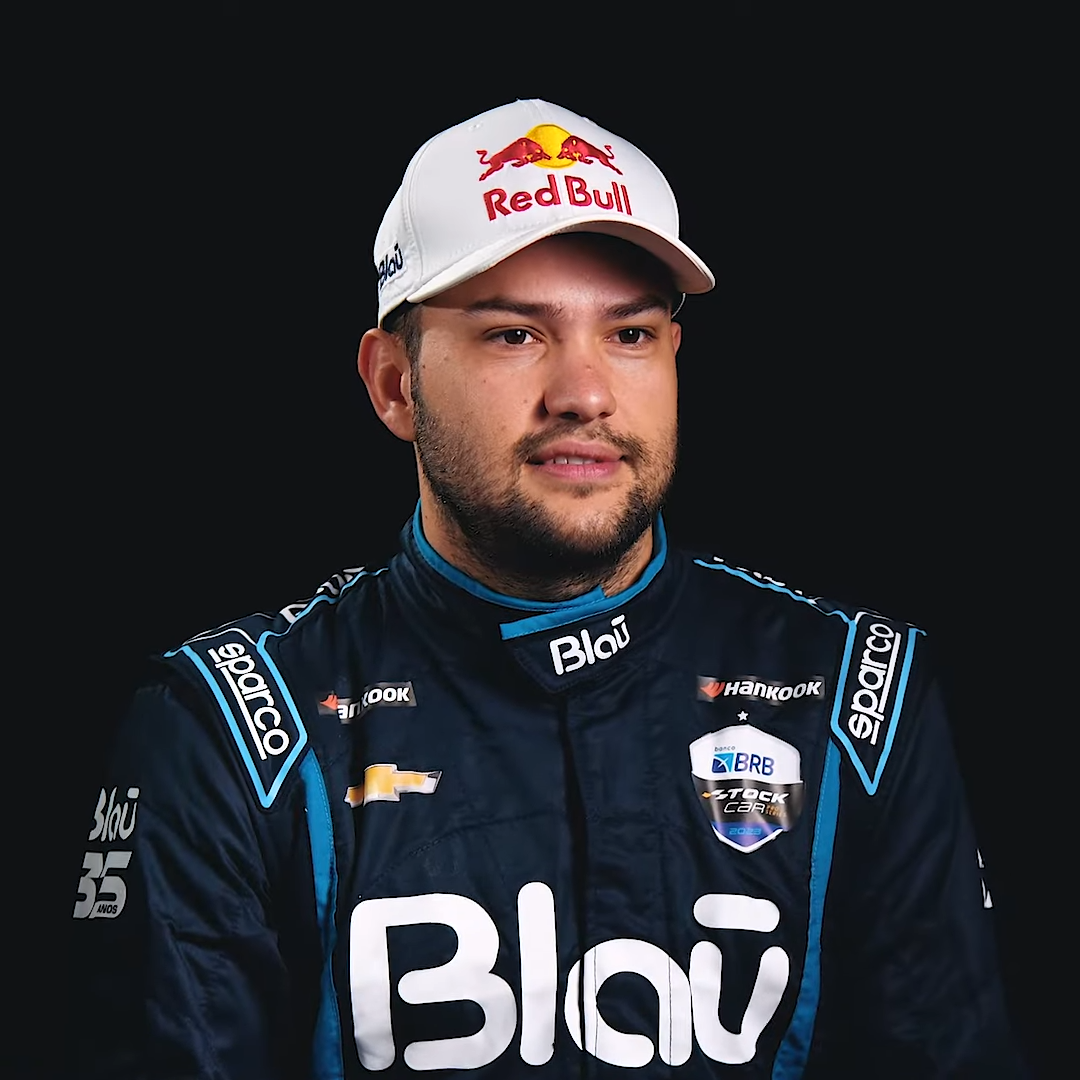
- Fraga in 2023
- Nationality: Brazilian
- Born: Felipe Castro Fraga; 3 July 1995 (age 31) Jacundá, Pará, Brazil

Stock Car Brasil
- Categorisation: FIA Silver (until 2019); FIA Gold (2020–)
- Years active: 2014–2019, 2022–present
- Teams: Eurofarma RC
- Starts: 25
- Championships: 2 (2016, 2025)
- Wins: 27
- Poles: 15
- Fastest laps: 19
- Best finish: 1st in 2016, 2025

Previous series
- 2012 2012 2013 2015, 2018-19 2019–21 2020– 2022: Eurocup Formula Renault 2.0; Formula Renault 2.0 Alps; Stock Car Light; Blancpain GT Series Endurance Cup; FIA World Endurance Championship - LMGTE Am; GT World Challenge Europe Endurance Cup; Deutsche Tourenwagen Masters

Championship titles
- 2013 2016: Stock Car Light; Stock Car Brasil

FIA World Endurance Championship - LMGTE Am career
- Years active: 2019 – 2021
- Teams: Team Project 1, TF Sport
- Starts: 11
- Championships: 0
- Wins: 1
- Poles: 2
- Fastest laps: 0
- Best finish: 2nd in 2021

Felipe Castro Fraga (born 3 July 1995) is a Brazilian racing driver who currently competes in the Stock Car Pro Series for Eurofarma RC and in the IMSA SportsCar Championship for Riley Motorsports. He has previously competed in the Deutsche Tourenwagen Masters and the FIA World Endurance Championship, where he is a race winner, and is a two time champion of Stock Car, winning the title in 2016 and 2025 and the 2013 Stock Car Light series.

== Endurance racing ==
In 2026, Fraga competed in the Rolex 24 at Daytona with Myers Riley Motorsports, driving a Ford Mustang GT3 alongside Romain Grosjean, Jenson Altzman and Sheena Monk. The team retired from the race after the car sustained damage following contact with other competitors, affecting its steering.

== Career results ==
=== Career summary ===
Season	Series	Team	Races	Wins	Poles	F.Laps	Podiums	Points	Position
2012	Formula Renault 2.0 Eurocup	Tech 1 Racing	8	0	0	0	1	21	18th
2012	Formula Renault 2.0 Alps	Tech 1 Racing	14	0	0	0	2	52	9th
2013	Campeonato Brasileiro de Turismo	W2 Racing	8	4	6	4	5	160	**1st**
2013	Top Race V6	ABH Sport	2	0	0	0	0	0	19th
2014	Stock Car Brasil	Vogel Motorsport	21	2	1	2	3	104	15th
2015	Stock Car Brasil	Voxx Racing	21	1	0	3	3	159	9th
2015	Blancpain Endurance Series	BMW Sports Trophy Team Brasil	5	0	0	0	0	8	22nd
2015	FARA Endurance Championship - MP-1A	Ginetta USA	1	0	0	0	1	0	NC
2016	Stock Car Brasil	Cimed Racing	21	5	4	3	8	309	**1st**
2016	Porsche Endurance Series	N/A	1	0	0	0	0	56	29th
2017	Stock Car Brasil	Cimed Racing Team	22	3	1	1	4	224	5th
2017	Porsche Endurance Series	N/A	3	1	0	0	1	142	6th
2018	Stock Car Brasil	Cimed Racing	21	3	2	2	7	310	**2nd**
2018	Porsche Endurance Series	N/A	1	0	0	0	1	104	11th
2018	Blancpain GT Series Endurance Cup	Strakka Racing	3	0	0	0	0	0	NC
2018	Intercontinental GT Challenge	Strakka Racing	2	0	0	0	0	0	NC
2018	IMSA SportsCar Championship - GTD	P1 Motorsports	1	0	0	0	0	24	59th
2019	Stock Car Brasil	Cimed Racing	20	3	0	1	3	313	4th
2019	Blancpain GT Series Endurance Cup	AKKA ASP Team	5	0	0	0	0	23	11th
2019	Intercontinental GT Challenge	AKKA ASP Team	1	0	0	0	0	0	NC
2019	Blancpain GT World Challenge Europe	AKKA ASP Team	3	0	0	0	0	6	20th
2019	IMSA SportsCar Championship - GTD	Mercedes-AMG Team Riley Motorsports	4	0	0	0	0	95	26th
2019	24H GT Series - A6-Pro	Black Falcon	1	1	1	0	1	0	NC
2019	24 Hours of Le Mans - GTE Am	Keating Motorsports	1	0	0	0	0	N/A	DSQ
2019-20	FIA World Endurance Championship - GTE Am	Team Project 1	5	0	0	0	1	32.5	17th
2020	Intercontinental GT Challenge	Team GruppeM Racing	1	0	0	0	0	0	NC
2020	Intercontinental GT Challenge	Mercedes-AMG Team AKKA ASP	1	0	0	0	0	0	NC
2020	GT World Challenge Europe Sprint Cup	AKKA ASP Team	2	0	0	0	1	9.5	18th
2020	GT World Challenge Europe Endurance Cup	AKKA ASP Team	3	0	0	0	2	52	5th
2020	IMSA SportsCar Championship - GTD	Riley Motorsports	1	0	0	0	0	20	52nd
2021	FIA World Endurance Championship - GTE Am	TF Sport	6	1	0	0	3	90.5	**2nd**
2021	Intercontinental GT Challenge	Mercedes-AMG Team AKKA ASP	1	0	0	0	0	4	19th
2021	GT World Challenge Europe Endurance Cup	AKKA ASP Team	3	1	0	0	2	44	7th
2021	IMSA SportsCar Championship - LMP3	Riley Motorsports	5	4	1	0	5	1846	4th
2021	IMSA Michelin Pilot Challenge - GS	Riley Motorsports	1	0	0	0	0	90	60th
2021	Porsche Endurance Series	N/A	1	0	0	0	0	42	20th
2022	Stock Car Pro Series	Crown Racing	1	0	0	0	0	0	NC*
2022	IMSA SportsCar Championship - LMP3	Riley Motorsports	6	3	2	2	3	1653	7th
2022	24 Hours of Le Mans - GTE Pro	Riley Motorsports	1	0	0	0	0	N/A	5th
2022	Deutsche Tourenwagen Masters	Red Bull AF Corse	14	1	1	1	2	60	16th
2023	Stock Car Pro Series	Blau Motorsport	20	0	3	3	7	265	5th
2023	IMSA SportsCar Championship - LMP3	Riley Motorsports	5	3	2	0	4	1439	6th
2023	Asian Le Mans Series - GT	Kessel Racing	0	0	0	0	0	0	NC
2023	GT World Challenge Europe Endurance Cup	CrowdStrike Racing by Riley Motorsports	1	0	0	0	0	0	NC
2024	Stock Car Pro Series	Blau Motorsport	24	1	1	0	3	685	13th
2024	IMSA SportsCar Championship - LMP2	Riley	7	0	0	0	4	2166	**2nd**
2024	Intercontinental GT Challenge	Mercedes-AMG Team GruppeM Racing	1	0	0	0	0	6	21st
2025	Stock Car Pro Series	Eurofarma RC	23	3	2	2	9	962	**1st**
2025	IMSA SportsCar Championship - LMP2	Riley	7	0	0	1	3	2047	4th
2025	European Le Mans Series - LMP2	DKR Engineering	1	0	0	0	0	6	14th
2026	Stock Car Pro Series	Eurofarma RC	19	4	1	2	8	813	**1st***
2026	IMSA SportsCar Championship - GTD	Myers Riley Motorsports	10	0	0	0	0	2011	15th
2026	European Le Mans Series - LMP2	CLX Motorsport	1	0	0	0	0	0	NC*
2026	TCR South America Touring Car Championship	W2 ProGP							

^{*} Season still in progress.

=== Complete Eurocup Formula Renault 2.0 results ===
(key) (Races in bold indicate pole position; races in italics indicate fastest lap)

Year	Entrant	1	2	3	4	5	6	7	8	9	10	11	12	13	14	DC	Points
2012	Tech 1 Racing	ALC; 1	ALC; 2	SPA; 1	SPA; 2	NÜR; 1; 10	NÜR; 2; 8	MSC; 1	MSC; 2	HUN; 1; 30	HUN; 2; 25	LEC; 1; 18	LEC; 2; 10	CAT; 1; 13	CAT; 2; 3	18th	21

=== Complete Formula Renault 2.0 Alps Series results ===
(key) (Races in bold indicate pole position; races in italics indicate fastest lap)

Year	Team	1	2	3	4	5	6	7	8	9	10	11	12	13	14	Pos	Points
2012	Tech 1 Racing	MNZ; 1; 24	MNZ; 2 Ret	PAU; 1; 3	PAU; 2 Ret	IMO; 1; 11	IMO; 2 Ret	SPA; 1; 6	SPA; 2; 4	RBR; 1; 15	RBR; 2; 9	MUG; 1; 12	MUG; 2; 13	CAT; 1; 15	CAT; 2; 3	9th	52

=== Complete Stock Car Pro Series results ===
Year	Team	Car	1	2	3	4	5	6	7	8	9	10	11	12	13	14	15	16	17	18	19	20	21	22	23	24	Pos	Points
2014	Vogel Motorsport	Chevrolet Sonic	INT; 1; 1	SCZ; 1; 28	SCZ; 2; 14	**BRA**; **1**; 15	BRA; 2; 9	GOI; 1; 1	GOI; 2; 19	GOI; 1; 15	CAS; 1; 26	CAS; 2; 29	CUR; 1; 15	CUR; 2; 16	VEL; 1 Ret	VEL; 2; 24	SCZ; 1; 5	SCZ; 2; 5	TAR; 1; 32	TAR; 2 DNS	SAL; 1; 2	SAL; 2 Ret	CUR; 1 Ret				15th	104
2015	Voxx Racing	Peugeot 408	GOI; 1; 7	RBP; 1; 14	RBP; 2 DNS	VEL; 1; 14	VEL; 2 DNS	CUR; 1; 15	CUR; 2; 15	SCZ; 1; 11	SCZ; 2; 22	CUR; 1 Ret	CUR; 2 DNS	GOI; 1; 5	CAS; 1; 12	CAS; 2; 13	MOU; 1; 6	MOU; 2; 1	CUR; 1 Ret	CUR; 2; 5	TAR; 1; 2	TAR; 2 Ret	INT; 1; 3				9th	159
2016	Voxx Racing	Peugeot 408	CUR; 1; 16	VEL; 1; 4	VEL; 2; 4	GOI; 1; 12	GOI; 2; 2	**SCZ**; **1**; 1	SCZ; 2; 15	TAR; 1; 2	TAR; 2 Ret	CAS; 1; 8	CAS; 2; 9	INT; 1; 1	LON; 1; 1	LON; 2; 12	**CUR**; **1**; 1	CUR; 2; 14	GOI; 1; 2	GOI; 2; 18†	**CRI**; **1**; 1	CRI; 2; 16	**INT**; **1**; 10				1st	310
2017	Cimed Racing	Chevrolet Cruze	GOI; 1; 8	GOI; 2; 10	VEL; 1; 10	**VEL**; **2**; 1	SCZ; 1; 9	SCZ; 2 Ret	CAS; 1; 7	CAS; 2 Ret	CUR; 1; 19	**CRI**; **1**; 1	CRI; 2; 4	VCA; 1; 1	VCA; 2; 16	LON; 1; 4	LON; 2 Ret	ARG; 1; 1	ARG; 2; 6	TAR; 1 Ret	TAR; 2; 7	GOI; 1; 21	GOI; 2 Ret	INT; 1; 8			6th	250
2018	Cimed Racing	Chevrolet Cruze	INT; 1 Ret	CUR; 1; 1	CUR; 2 Ret	VEL; 1; 4	VEL; 2; 5	LON; 1; 5	LON; 2 Ret	SCZ; 1; 14	SCZ; 2; 3	GOI; 1; 4	MOU; 1; 1	MOU; 1 Ret	**CAS**; **1**; 2	CAS; 2; 7	VCA; 1; 1	VCA; 2; 6	**TAR**; **1**; 10	**TAR**; **2**; 4	GOI; 1; 2	GOI; 2; 3	INT; 1; 5				2nd	310
2019	Cimed Racing	Chevrolet Cruze	VEL; 1; 5	VCA; 1; 5	VCA; 1; 5	GOI; 1 Ret	GOI; 2; 9	LON; 1; 5	LON; 2; 6	SCZ; 1 Ret	SCZ; 2 DNS	MOU; 1; 5	MOU; 2; 4	INT; 1; 12	VEL; 1; 1	VEL; 2; 7	CAS; 1; 1	CAS; 2; 13	VCA; 1; 7	VCA; 2; 16	GOI; 1; 6	GOI; 2; 1	INT; 1; 6				4th	313
2022	Crown Racing	Chevrolet Cruze	INT; 1; 11	GOI; 1	GOI; 2	RIO; 1	RIO; 2	VCA; 1	VCA; 2	VLP; 1	VLP; 2	VLP; 1	VLP; 2														31st	25
2022	Eurofarma RC	Chevrolet Cruze												INT; 1; 20	INT; 2; 1	VCA; 1	VCA; 2	SCZ; 1	SCZ; 2	GOI; 1	GOI; 2	GOI; 1	GOI; 2	INT; 1	INT; 2		31st	25
2023	Blau Motorsport	Chevrolet Cruze	GOI; 1 Ret	GOI; 2; 3	INT; 1; 8	INT; 2; 20	TAR; 1; 2	TAR; 2 Ret	**CAS**; **1**; 2	CAS; 2; 20	INT; 1	INT; 2	VCA; 1; 11	VCA; 2; 9	GOI; 1; 6	GOI; 2 Ret	VEL; 1; 2	VEL; 2; 9	**BUE**; **1**; 2	BUE; 2; 6	**VCA**; **1**; 2	VCA; 2; 3	CAS; 1; 16	CAS; 2; 25	INT; 1 Ret	INT; 2; 9	5th	265
2024	Blau Motorsport	Chevrolet Cruze	GOI; 1; 17	GOI; 2 Ret	VCA; 1; 3	INT; 1; 17	INT; 2; 8	CAS; 1; 13	CAS; 2; 14	VCA; 1; 9	VCA; 2; 8	VCA; 3; 12	GOI; 1; 12	GOI; 2; 22	BLH; 1; 24†	BLH; 2; 14	VEL; 1 Ret	VEL; 2; 4	BUE; 1; 9	BUE; 2; 6	URU; 1; 12	**URU**; **2**; 1	GOI; 1; 3	GOI; 2; 27†	INT; 1; 20	INT; 2; 18	13th	685
2025	Eurofarma RC	Mitsubishi Eclipse Cross	**INT**; **1**; 1	CAS; 1; 7	**CAS**; **2**; 2	VEL; 1 Ret	VEL; 2; 17	VCA; 1; 7	VCA; 2; 4	CRS; 1; 6	CRS; 2; 3	CAS; 1; 4	CAS; 2; 2	VCA; 1; 5	VCA; 2; 2	VCA; 1; 11	VCA; 2; 11	MOU; 1 Ret	MOU; 2; 3	CUI; 1; 7	CUI; 2; 8	BRA; 1; 1	BRA; 2; 2	INT; 1; 1	INT; 2; 7		1st	962
2026	Eurofarma RC	Mitsubishi Eclipse Cross	CRS; 1; 4	CRS; 2; 1	CAS; 1; 8	CAS; 2; 4	INT; 1; 8	INT; 2; 3	GOI; 1; 1	GOI; 2; 19	CUI; 1; 5	CUI; 2; 2	VCA; 1; 3	VCA; 2; 2	SCZ; 1; 27	**SCZ**; **2**; 1	CRS; 1; 8	CRS; 2; 24	BRA; 1; 15	CAS; 1; 1	CAS; 2; 10	VEL; 1	INT; 1	INT; 2			1st*	813*

^{†} Driver did not finish the race, but was classified as he completed over 90% of the race distance.
^{*} Season still in progress.

=== Complete 24 Hours of Le Mans results ===
Year	Team	Co-Drivers	Car	Class	Laps	Pos.	Class Pos.
2019	(United States) Keating Motorsport	(United States) Ben Keating (Netherlands) Jeroen Bleekemolen	Ford GT	GTE; Am	334	DSQ	DSQ
2020	(Germany) Team Project 1	(United States) Ben Keating (Netherlands) Jeroen Bleekemolen	Porsche 911 RSR	GTE; Am	326	40th	14th
2021	(United Kingdom) TF Sport	(United States) Ben Keating (Luxembourg) Dylan Pereira	Aston Martin Vantage AMR	GTE; Am	339	26th	**2nd**
2022	(United States) Riley Motorsports	(United Kingdom) Sam Bird (New Zealand) Shane van Gisbergen	Ferrari 488 GTE Evo	GTE; Pro	347	32nd	5th

=== Complete 24 Hours of Daytona results ===
Year	Team	Co-Drivers	Car	Class	Laps	Pos.	Class Pos.
2019	(United States) Mercedes-AMG Team Riley Motorsports	(United States) Ben Keating (Netherlands) Jeroen Bleekemolen (Germany) Luca Stolz	Mercedes-AMG GT3	GTD	560	22nd	**2nd**
2020	(United States) Riley Motorsports	(United States) Lawson Aschenbach (United States) Ben Keating (United States) Gar Robinson	Mercedes-AMG GT3 Evo	GTD	740	29th	11th
2022	(United States) Riley Motorsports	(Netherlands) Kay van Berlo (United States) Michael Cooper (United States) Gar Robinson	Ligier JS P320	LMP3	723	13th	**1st**
2023	(United States) Riley Motorsports	(Netherlands) Glenn van Berlo (Australia) Josh Burdon (United States) Gar Robinson	Ligier JS P320	LMP3	89	60th	9th

=== Complete IMSA SportsCar Championship results ===
(key) (Races in bold indicate pole position; results in italics indicate fastest lap)

Year	Team	Class	Make	Engine	1	2	3	4	5	6	7	8	9	10	11	Pos.	Points	Ref
2018	P1 Motorsports	GTD	Mercedes-AMG GT3	Mercedes-AMG M159 6.2 L V8	DAY	SEB	MDO	DET	WGL	MOS	LIM	ELK	VIR	LGA	PET; 7	59th	24	
2019	Mercedes-AMG Team Riley Motorsports	GTD	Mercedes-AMG GT3	Mercedes-AMG M159 6.2 L V8	DAY; 6	SEB; 5	MDO	DET	WGL; 15	MOS	LIM	ELK	VIR	LGA	PET; 4	26th	95	
2020	Riley Motorsports	GTD	Mercedes-AMG GT3	Mercedes-AMG M159 6.2 L V8	DAY; 11	DAY	SEB	ELK	VIR	ATL	MDO	CHA	PET	LGA	SEB	50th	20	
2021	Riley Motorsports	LMP3	Ligier JS P320	VK56DE 5.6L V8	DAY	SEB	**MDO**; 1	WGL; 1	WGL; 1	ELK; 3	PET; 1					4th	1846	
2022	Riley Motorsports	LMP3	Ligier JS P320	Nissan VK56DE 5.6 L V8	DAY; 1	**SEB**; 7	MDO; 4	WGL; 1	MOS	ELK; 1	**PET**; 4					7th	1653	
2023	Riley Motorsports	LMP3	Ligier JS P320	Nissan VK56DE 5.6 L V8	DAY; 9	SEB; 1	**WGL**; 1	**MOS**; 1	ELK	IMS	PET; 3					6th	1439	
2024	Riley	LMP2	Oreca 07	Gibson GK428 4.2 L V8	DAY; 3	SEB; 5	WGL; 2	MOS; 2	ELK; 10	IMS; 5	PET; 2					2nd	2166	
2025	Riley	LMP2	Oreca 07	Gibson GK428 V8	DAY; 2	SEB; 4	WGL; 5	MOS; 3	ELK; 11	IMS; 3	PET; 8					4th	2047	
2026	Myers Riley Motorsports	GTD	Ford Mustang GT3	Ford Coyote 5.4 L V8	DAY; 19	SEB; 11	LBH; 7	LGA; 8	WGL; 14	MOS; 8	ELK; 19	VIR; 12	IMS; 9	PET; 15		15th	2011	

=== Complete FIA World Endurance Championship results ===
(key) (Races in bold indicate pole position; races in italics indicate fastest lap)

Year	Entrant	Class	Chassis	Engine	1	2	3	4	5	6	7	8	Rank	Points
2019–20	Team Project 1	LMGTE Am	Porsche 911 RSR	Porsche 4.0 L Flat-6	SIL; 10	FUJ; 3	SHA	BHR	COA; 11	SPA; 6	LMS; 8	BHR	17th	32.5
2021	TF Sport	LMGTE Am	Aston Martin Vantage AMR	Aston Martin 4.0 L Turbo V8	**SPA**; 2	ALG; 7	**MNZ**; 12	LMS; 2	BHR; 1	BHR; Ret			2nd	90.5

=== Complete 12 Hours of Sebring results ===
Year	Team	Co-Drivers	Car	Class	Laps	Pos.	Class Pos.
2019	(United States) Mercedes-AMG Team Riley Motorsports	(United States) Ben Keating (Netherlands) Jeroen Bleekemolen	Mercedes-AMG GT3	GTD	320	23rd	5th
2022	(United States) Riley Motorsports	(Netherlands) Kay van Berlo (United States) Gar Robinson	Ligier JS P320	LMP3	232	46th	7th
2023	(United States) Riley Motorsports	(Australia) Josh Burdon (United States) Gar Robinson	Ligier JS P320	LMP3	309	12th	**1st**

=== Complete Bathurst 12 Hour results ===
Year	Team	Co-Drivers	Car	Class	Laps	Pos.	Class Pos.
2020	(Hong Kong) Mercedes-AMG Team GruppeM Racing	(Germany) Maximilian Buhk (Italy) Raffaele Marciello	Mercedes-AMG GT3	GT3 Pro	314	6th	6th
2024	(Hong Kong) Mercedes-AMG Team GruppeM Racing	(Germany) Maro Engel (Australia) David Reynolds	Mercedes-AMG GT3 Evo	GT3 Pro	275	8th	8th

=== Complete Deutsche Tourenwagen Masters results ===
(key) (Races in bold indicate pole position; races in italics indicate fastest lap)

Year	Entrant	Chassis	1	2	3	4	5	6	7	8	9	10	11	12	13	14	15	16	Rank	Points
2022	Red Bull AF Corse	Ferrari 488 GT3 Evo 2020	ALG; 1 Ret	ALG; 2; 2^{3}	LAU; 1 Ret	LAU; 2 DNS	IMO; 1 Ret	IMO; 2 Ret^{2}	NOR; 1 Ret	**NOR**; **2**; 1^{1}	NÜR; 1 Ret	NÜR; 2 DSQ	SPA; 1; 7	SPA; 2; 8	RBR; 1 Ret	RBR; 2; 15	HOC; 1; 13	HOC; 2 DNS	16th	60

=== Complete European Le Mans Series results ===
(key) (Races in bold indicate pole position; races in italics indicate fastest lap)

Year	Team	Class	Car	Engine	1	2	3	4	5	6	Rank	Points
2025	DKR Engineering	LMP2 Pro-Am	Oreca 07	Gibson GK428 4.2 L V8	CAT	LEC	IMO	SPA	SIL; 7	ALG	14th	6
2026	CLX Motorsport	LMP2 Pro-Am	Oreca 07	Gibson GK428 4.2 L V8	CAT; Ret	LEC	IMO	SPA	SIL	ALG	NC	0

^{*} Season still in progress.

Sporting positions
Preceded by Rafael Daniel (Copa Chevrolet Montana)	Campeonato Brasileiro de Turismo; Champion; 2013	Succeeded by Guilherme Salas
Preceded by Marcos Gomes	Stock Car Brasil; Champion; 2016	Succeeded by Daniel Serra
Preceded by Alex Fontana; Mikaël Grenier; Adrian Zaugg	Blancpain GT Series Endurance Cup; Silver Cup Champion; 2019; With: Nico Bastian & Timur Boguslavskiy	Succeeded by Alex MacDowall; Patrick Kujala; Frederik Schandorff (GT World Challenge Europe Endurance Cup)
Preceded by Gabriel Casagrande	Stock Car Pro Series; Champion; 2025	Succeeded by Incumbent
