= 2026 Copa Truck season =

Motorsport season

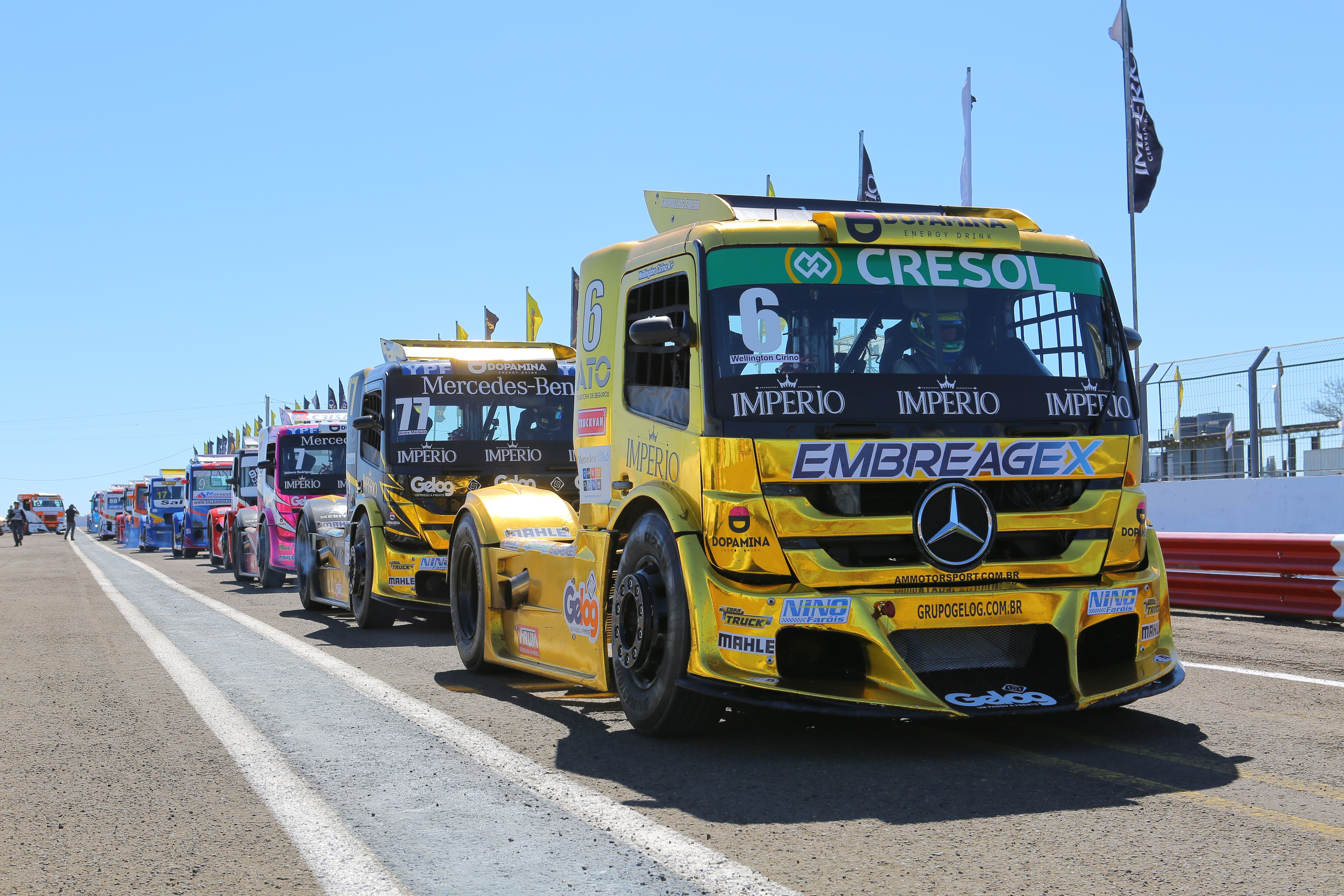
Copa Truck event

The 2026 Copa Truck Be8 BeVant is the tenth season of the Truck Cup.

The category's origins came after nine teams left Formula Truck due to disagreements with the problematic management of Neusa Navarro Félix. These teams joined in an association to create the category that replaced Formula Truck. The new category brings together teams and drivers from the old category.

In November 2017, it was approved by the Brazilian Automobile Confederation (CBA) and recognized as an official championship. Carlos Col, former head of the Stock Car Pro Series, is its promoter.

The Truck Cup was officially launched on April 27, 2017, in São Paulo. In the first season, the championship was divided into three regional cups: Midwest, Northeast, and Southeast. The first stage took place on May 28, in Goiânia, with 17 trucks on the grid.

The association is made up of the following teams: RM Competições, AJ5 Sports, DF Motorsport, RVR Motorsports, Dakar Motors, Fábio Fogaça Motorsports, Lucar Motorsports and Clay Truck Racing.

== Teams and drivers ==
Manufacturer	Team	No.	Drivers	Class	Rounds
Volkswagen	(Brazil) R9 Competições	3	(Brazil) Ricardo Alvarez	S	1–3
Volkswagen	(Brazil) R9 Competições	4	(Brazil) Felipe Giaffone	P	1–3
Volkswagen	(Brazil) R9 Competições	17	(Brazil) Thiago Rizzo	P	1–3
Volkswagen	(Brazil) R9 Competições	31	(Brazil) Nicolas Giaffone	S	1–3
Volkswagen	(Brazil) R9 Competições	44	(Brazil) Vinicius Palma	S	1–3
Volkswagen	(Brazil) R9 Competições	54	(Brazil) Rafa Lopes	S	1–3
Volkswagen	(Brazil) R9 Competições	88	(Brazil) Beto Monteiro	P	1–3
Volkswagen	(Brazil) R9 Competições	00	(Brazil) Danilo Alamini	P	1–3
Mercedes-Benz	(Brazil) D+ Motorsport	6	(Brazil) Wellington Cirino	P	1–3
Mercedes-Benz	(Brazil) D+ Motorsport	25	(Brazil) Jaidson Zini	P	1–3
Mercedes-Benz	(Brazil) D+ Motorsport	27	(Brazil) Fábio Fogaça	P	1–3
Mercedes-Benz	(Brazil) D+ Motorsport	45	(Brazil) Daniel Kelemen	S	1–3
Mercedes-Benz	(Brazil) D+ Motorsport	116	(Brazil) Arthur Scherer	P	1–3
Mercedes-Benz	(Brazil) Tiger Team	8	(Brazil) Fabio Luis	S	2
Mercedes-Benz	(Brazil) Tiger Team	69	(Brazil) Evandro Camargo	P	1–3
Mercedes-Benz	(Brazil) Tiger Team	97	(Brazil) Maicon Roncen	S	1–3
Mercedes-Benz	(Brazil) Tiger Team	811	(Brazil) Mauricio Arias	S	1–3
Mercedes-Benz	(Brazil) PP Motorsport	5	(Brazil) Adalberto Jadim	P	1–3
Mercedes-Benz	(Brazil) PP Motorsport	29	(Brazil) Pedro Paulo Fernandes	P	1–3
Mercedes-Benz	(Brazil) PP Motorsport	99	(Brazil) Luiz Lopes	P	1–3
Mercedes-Benz	(Brazil) Full Time Sports	55	(Brazil) Paulo Salustiano	P	1–3
Mercedes-Benz	(Brazil) Full Time Sports	57	(Brazil) Felipe Tozzo	P	1–3
Mercedes-Benz	(Brazil) Full Time Sports	77	(Brazil) André Marques	P	1–3
Mercedes-Benz	(Brazil) Full Time Sports	81	(Brazil) José Augusto Dias	S	1–3
Mercedes-Benz	(Brazil) Full Time Sports	117	(Brazil) Pedro Perdocini	P	1–3
Mercedes-Benz	(Brazil) Anchieta FF Motorsport	126	(Brazil) Marcio Giordano	S	1–3
Iveco	(Brazil) Usual Racing	21	(Brazil) Djalma Pivetta	S	1–3
Iveco	(Brazil) Usual Racing	26	(Brazil) Raphael Abbate	P	1–3
Iveco	(Brazil) Usual Racing	28	(Brazil) Danilo Dirani	P	1–3
Iveco	(Brazil) Cavaleiro Sports	22	(Brazil) Thaline Chicoski	S	1–3
Iveco	(Brazil) Cavaleiro Sports	777	(Brazil) Beto Cavaleiro	S	2–3
Iveco	(Brazil) Scuderia Chiarelli	54	(Brazil) Diogo Moscato	S	1–3
Iveco	(Brazil) Dakar Motorsport	111	(Brazil) Bia Figueiredo	P	1–3
Volvo	(Brazil) Vannucci Racing	33	(Brazil) Rodrigo Taborda	S	2–3
Volvo	(Brazil) Vannucci Racing	73	(Brazil) Leandro Totti	P	1–3
Volvo	(Brazil) Vannucci Racing	92	(Brazil) Hugo Cibien	S	1–3
Volvo	(Brazil) Boessio Competições	83	(Brazil) Régis Boessio	S	2–3
Scania	(Brazil) Electric Truck	12	(Brazil) Juca Bala	S	1–3
Scania	(Brazil) Electric Truck	70	(Brazil) Kléber Eletric	S	1–3

Icon	Class
P	Pro
S	Super

== Calendar ==
=== Schedule ===
Round	Date	Circuit	City
1	March 8	(Mato Grosso do Sul) Autódromo Internacional Orlando Moura	Campo Grande, MS
2	April 12	(Rio Grande do Sul) Autódromo Internacional de Santa Cruz do Sul	Santa Cruz do Sul, RS
3	May 3	(Paraná (state)) Autódromo Internacional de Cascavel	Cascavel, PR
4	May 31	(São Paulo (state)) Autódromo José Carlos Pace	São Paulo, SP
5	August 2	Autódromo Internacional de Mato Grosso	Cuiabá, MG
6	August 23	(Paraná (state)) Autódromo Internacional Ayrton Senna	Londrina, PR
7	September 20	(Minas Gerais) Circuito dos Cristais	Curvelo, MG
8	November 1	(Santa Catarina (state)) Autódromo Internacional de Chapecó	Chapecó, SC
9	November 29	(Federal District (Brazil)) Autódromo Internacional de Brasília	Brasília, DF
