= Daniel Serra =

Brazilian auto racing driver (born 1984)

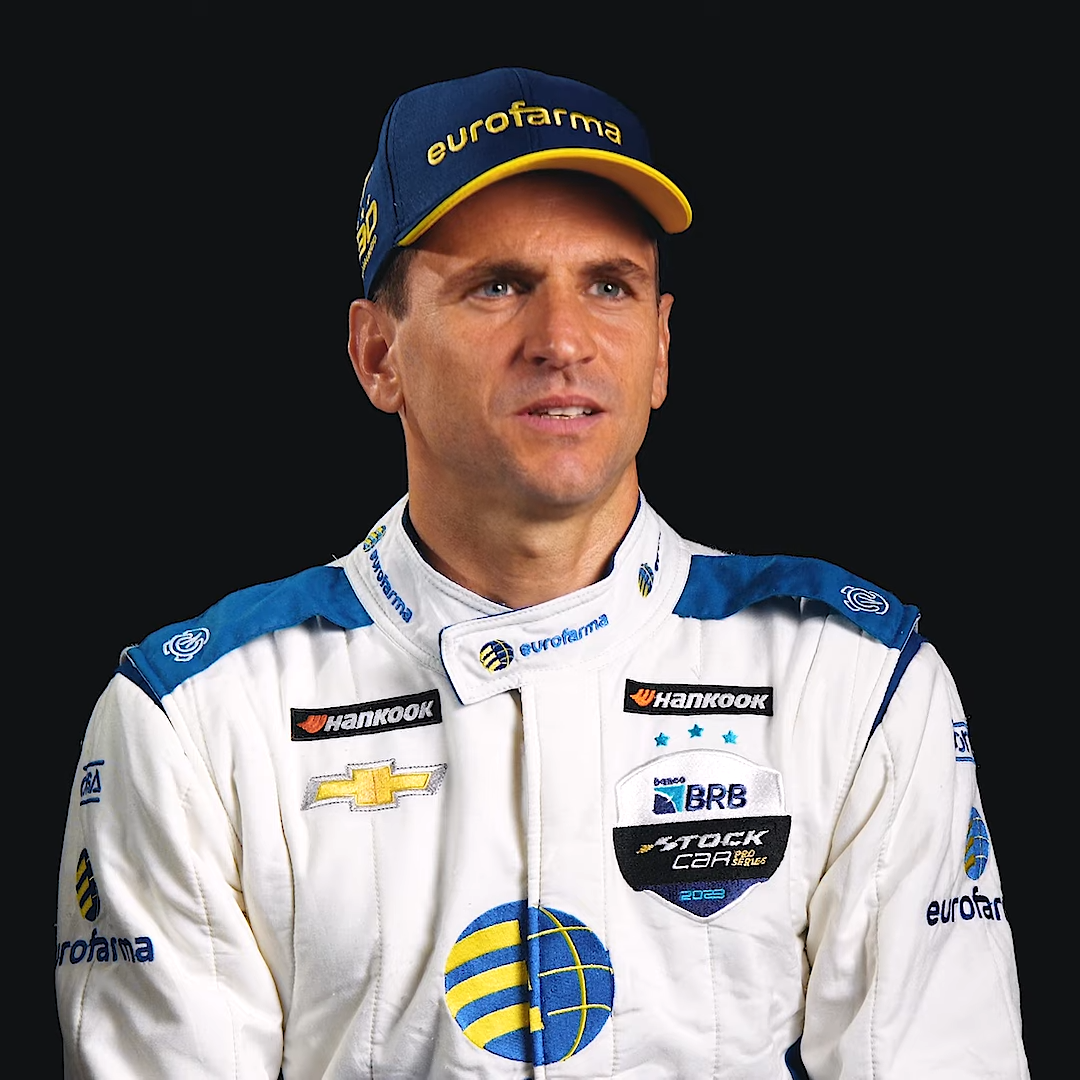
- Serra in 2023
- Nationality: (Brazil) Brazilian
- Born: Daniel Gardano Serra; 24 February 1984 (age 42) São Paulo (Brazil)
- Relatives: Chico Serra (father)

Stock Car Pro Series career
- Debut season: 2007
- Current team: Blau Motorsport
- Categorisation: FIA Gold (until 2020); FIA Platinum (2021–)
- Car number: 29
- Starts: 357
- Championships: 3 (2017, 2018, 2019)
- Wins: 26
- Podiums: 87
- Poles: 17
- Fastest laps: 30

Championship titles
- 2017-2019: Stock Car Brasil

24 Hours of Le Mans career
- Years: 2017 –
- Teams: Aston Martin, AF Corse
- Best finish: 17th (2017)
- Class wins: 2 (2017, 2019)

Daniel Gardano Serra (born 24 February 1984) is a Brazilian auto racing driver. He competes full-time in the Brazilian Stock Car Pro Series and is also a Ferrari factory driver.

Serra won the Stock Car Brasil series three times (2017, 2018 and 2019). He is a two-time 24 Hours of Le Mans GTE Pro class winner, having won in 2017 with Darren Turner and Jonny Adam, while driving for Aston Martin Racing, and again in 2019, with James Calado and Alessandro Pier Guidi, driving for AF Corse.

== Career ==
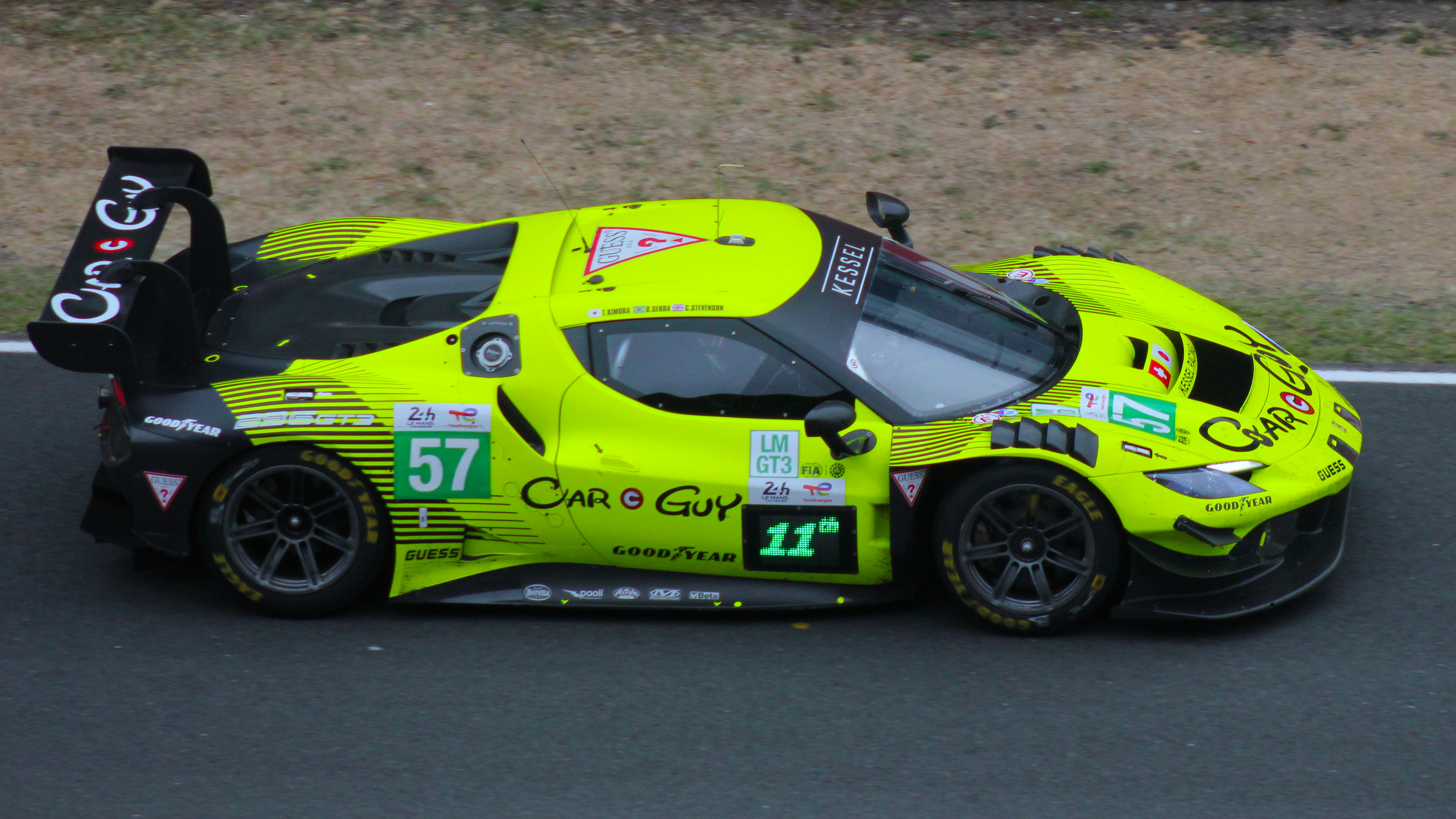
Serra's No. 57 car at the 2025 24 Hours of Le Mans

Son of Formula One racer and three-time Stock Car champion Chico Serra, Serra began karting at the age of fourteen, after receiving permission from his parents. He competed in Formula Renault 2.0 Brazil and Eurocup Formula Renault 2.0; however, a lack of sponsorship brought him back to Brazil. In Stock Car Light, he was the runner-up, opening the doors for him to join the Stock Car Championship. In his debut season driving the Red Bull-Amir Nasr, he scored pole position and finished the Championship in eighth place. In 2009, he joined Red Bull-WA Mattheis. On 20 September 2009, he won for the first time in Stock Car. After joining Eurofarma RC for the 2017 season, Serra won his first Stock Car title, a feat he would repeat in the next season. On the international level, he has competed part time in the FIA World Endurance Championship for Aston Martin Racing and AF Corse, winning the 2017 and 2019 24 Hours of Le Mans.

== Racing record ==
=== Career summary ===
Season	Series	Team name	Races	Poles	Wins	Podiums	F/Laps	Points	Position
2002	Formula Renault 2.0 Brazil	?	6	0	0	0	0	14	19th
2003	Formula Renault 2.0 Brazil	Medina Motorsport	12	0	0	3	0	86	7th
2004	Formula Renault 2.0 Brazil	Bassani Racing	14	5	3	8	2	245	**2nd**
2005	Eurocup Formula Renault 2.0	Cram Competition	16	0	0	0	0	17	17th
2006	Stock Car Light	WB Motorsport	9	2	3	5	2	133	**2nd**
2007	Le Mans Series - GT2	JMB Racing	1	0	0	0	0	3	25th
2007	International GT Open	JMB Racing	4	0	0	0	0	N/A	NC
2007	Stock Car Brasil	Red Bull Racing	12	1	0	1	1	223	8th
2008	GT3 Brasil Championship	Via Italia	6	0	0	0	0	0	NC
2008	International GT Open	Escuderia Osona	4	0	0	1	0	6	24th
2008	Stock Car Brasil	Red Bull Racing	12	0	0	0	0	17	28th
2009	GT3 Brasil Championship	Ferrari Scuderia	11	4	1	6	4	112	11th
2009	Brazilian Endurance Championship	Ferrari Scuderia	?	?	?	?	?	?	**2nd**
2009	TC 2000	Ford-YPF	3	0	1	1	0	0†	NC†
2009	TC 2000 Copa Endurance Series	Ford-YPF	3	0	1	1	0	32	4th
2009	Stock Car Brasil	Red Bull Racing	12	0	1	1	0	234	9th
2010	GT Brasil - GT3	Lamborghini Cimed	16	3	2	6	4	167	**3rd**
2010	Brazilian Endurance Championship	Via Itália	?	?	?	?	?	?	**1st**
2010	TC 2000	Ford-YPF	1	0	0	0	0	0†	NC†
2010	FIA GT1 World Championship	Triple H Team Hegersport	2	0	0	0	0	0	57th
2010	Stock Car Brasil	Red Bull Racing	12	1	0	0	0	224	9th
2011	GT Brasil - GT3	Via Italia	20	5	0	3	8	137	7th
2011	Brasileiro de Marcas	Serra Motosport	16	2	2	7	3	220	**2nd**
2011	Stock Car Brasil	Red Bull Racing	12	0	1	3	1	240	5th
2012	Brazilian Endurance Championship	Via Italia	2	1	1	1	1	79	**2nd**
2012	Stock Car Brasil	Red Bull Racing	12	1	0	4	0	169	4th
2013	Stock Car Brasil	Red Bull Racing	12	3	1	3	6	181	4
2013	Campeonato Sudamericano de GT - GT3	Via Italia	6	3	1	5	5	92	5
2013	Rolex Sports Car Series - GT	Scuderia Corsa Michelotto	1	0	0	0	0	16	62
2014	Stock Car Brasil	Red Bull Racing	21	2	1	2	5	182	5th
2014	United SportsCar Championship - GTD	Scuderia Corsa	1	0	0	0	0	23	73
2015	Stock Car Brasil	Red Bull Racing	19	2	1	1	6	181	6th
2015	United SportsCar Championship - GTD	Scuderia Corsa	2	0	0	0	0	27	40th
2016	Stock Car Brasil	Red Bull Racing	21	1	1	0	4	229	**3rd**
2016	IMSA SportsCar Championship - GTLM	Scuderia Corsa	6	0	1	0	1	164	10th
2017	Stock Car Brasil	Eurofarma RC	22	4	4	5	10	371	**1st**
2017	FIA World Endurance Championship - LMGTE Pro	Aston Martin Racing	6	1	1	1	1	79	9th
2017	24 Hours of Le Mans - LMGTE Pro	Aston Martin Racing	1	1	1	1	1	N/A	**1st**
2018	Stock Car Brasil	Eurofarma RC	21	2	4	1	11	338	**1st**
2018	IMSA SportsCar Championship - GTD	Spirit of Race	2	0	2	1	0	77	29th
2018	IMSA SportsCar Championship - GTD	Squadra Corse Garage Italia	1	0	0	0	0	77	29th
2018	IMSA SportsCar Championship - GTD	Scuderia Corsa	1	1	0	0	1	77	29th
2018	Blancpain GT Series Endurance Cup	Belgian Audi Club Team WRT	1	0	0	0	0	0	NC
2018	International GT Open	Luzich Racing	4	2	2	0	2	31	15th
2018	24 Hours of Le Mans - LMGTE Pro	AF Corse	1	0	0	0	0	N/A	7th
2018-19	FIA World Endurance Championship - LMGTE Pro	AF Corse	3	1	0	0	1	71	6th
2019	Stock Car Brasil	Eurofarma RC	21	1	0	3	9	387	**1st**
2019	IMSA SportsCar Championship - GTD	Spirit of Race	1	0	0	0	0	11	67th
2019	IMSA SportsCar Championship - GTLM	Risi Competizione	1	1	1	0	1	35	22nd
2019	Blancpain GT Series Endurance Cup	HubAuto Corsa	1	0	0	0	0	0	NC
2019	Blancpain GT World Challenge America	R. Ferri Motorsport	4	3	2	2	4	93	8th
2019	24 Hours of Le Mans - LMGTE Pro	AF Corse	1	1	0	0	1	N/A	**1st**
2019-20	Asian Le Mans Series - GT	Spirit of Race	1	0	0	0	1	15	15th
2019-20	FIA World Endurance Championship - LMGTE Pro	AF Corse	2	0	0	0	1	37	14th
2020	Stock Car Brasil	Eurofarma RC	17	1	0	2	5	275	**3rd**
2020	IMSA SportsCar Championship - GTLM	Risi Competizione	1	0	0	0	0	25	16th
2020	European Le Mans Series - LMGTE	AF Corse	1	0	0	0	0	8	17th
2020	GT World Challenge Europe Endurance Cup	AF Corse	1	0	0	0	0	0	NC
2020	24 Hours of Le Mans - LMGTE Pro	AF Corse	1	0	0	0	1	N/A	**2nd**
2021	Stock Car Brasil	Eurofarma RC	24	1	0	4	5	354	**2nd**
2021	IMSA SportsCar Championship - GTD	AF Corse	1	0	0	0	0	246	55th
2021	FIA World Endurance Championship - LMGTE Pro	AF Corse	6	0	1	0	3	92	4th
2021	24 Hours of Le Mans - LMGTE Pro	AF Corse	1	0	0	0	0	N/A	5th
2022	Stock Car Pro Series	Eurofarma RC	23	1	1	1	5	316	**2nd**
2022	IMSA SportsCar Championship - GTD Pro	Risi Competizione	4	0	1	0	3	1213	8th
2022	FIA World Endurance Championship - LMGTE Pro	AF Corse	1	0	0	0	1	36	11th
2022	24 Hours of Le Mans - LMGTE Pro	AF Corse	1	0	0	0	1	N/A	**2nd**
2022	Intercontinental GT Challenge	AF Corse	1	0	0	0	1	33	8th
2022	Intercontinental GT Challenge	Iron Lynx	1	0	0	0	1	33	8th
2022	GT World Challenge Europe Endurance Cup	Iron Lynx	3	1	1	0	2	68	**3rd**
2023	Stock Car Pro Series	Eurofarma RC	23	3	0	1	5	296	**2nd**
2023	IMSA SportsCar Championship - GTD Pro	Risi Competizione	4	0	1	1	2	1192	6th
2023	FIA World Endurance Championship - LMGTE Am	Kessel Racing	5	0	0	1	1	43	11th
2023	24 Hours of Le Mans - LMGTE Am	Kessel Racing	1	0	0	0	0	N/A	DNF
2023	European Le Mans Series - LMGTE	Kessel Racing	3	0	0	2	0	22	14th
2023	GT World Challenge Europe Endurance Cup	AF Corse - Francorchamps Motors	4	0	0	0	1	33	10th
2023	FIA GT World Cup	Harmony Racing	1	0	0	0	0	N/A	4th
2024	Stock Car Pro Series	Eurofarma RC	23	2	3	1	5	779	8th
2024	IMSA SportsCar Championship - GTD Pro	Risi Competizione	5	1	1	1	3	2186	11th
2024	IMSA SportsCar Championship - GTD Pro	Conquest Racing	2	1	0	1	1	2186	11th
2024	European Le Mans Series - LMGT3	Kessel Racing	6	2	0	1	2	74	**2nd**
2024	24 Hours of Le Mans - LMGT3	GR Racing	1	0	0	0	0	N/A	12th
2024	FIA GT World Cup	Harmony Racing	1	0	0	0	0	N/A	14th
2024-25	Asian Le Mans Series - GT	Car Guy Racing	6	1	0	0	1	34	8th
2025	Stock Car Pro Series	Blau Motorsport	23	0	0	0	1	457	20th
2025	IMSA SportsCar Championship - GTD	Conquest Racing	10	0	0	0	3	2534	7th
2025	European Le Mans Series - LMGT3	Kessel Racing	4	0	0	0	1	24	13th
2025	24 Hours of Le Mans - LMGT3	Kessel Racing	1	0	0	0	0	N/A	8th
2025	Intercontinental GT Challenge	Arise Racing GT	1	0	0	0	0	12	25th
2026	Stock Car Pro Series	Blau Motorsport	18	0	0	0	2	468	15th*
2026	IMSA SportsCar Championship - GTD Pro	Risi Competizione	5	0	0	0	0	1206	12th
2026	European Le Mans Series - LMGT3	Kessel Racing	6	1	0	0	2	52	6th
2026	24 Hours of Le Mans - LMGT3	Kessel Racing	1	0	0	0	0	N/A	10th
2026	Intercontinental GT Challenge	Arise Racing GT	1	0	0	0	0	4	28th

† - ineligible for points. ^{*} Season still in progress.

=== Complete Eurocup Formula Renault 2.0 results ===
(key) (Races in bold indicate pole position; races in italics indicate fastest lap)

Year	Entrant	1	2	3	4	5	6	7	8	9	10	11	12	13	14	15	16	DC	Points
2005	Cram Competition	ZOL; 1; 26	ZOL; 2; 15	VAL; 1; 12	VAL; 2; 8	LMS; 1; 5	LMS; 2; 16	BIL; 1; 18	BIL; 2 Ret	OSC; 1; 13	OSC; 2; 8	DON; 1 Ret	DON; 2 Ret	EST; 1; 10	EST; 2 Ret	MNZ; 1; 7	MNZ; 2; 20	17th	17

=== Complete Stock Car Pro Series results ===
(key) (Races in bold indicate pole position) (Races in italics indicate fastest lap)

Year	Team	Car	1	2	3	4	5	6	7	8	9	10	11	12	13	14	15	16	17	18	19	20	21	22	23	24	Rank	Points
2007	Red Bull-Amir Nasr	Volkswagen Bora	**INT**; 3	CUR; 5	MOU; 7	INT; Ret	LON; 30	SCZ; Ret	CUR; 12	BRA; 7	ARG; 10	TAR; 15	RIO; 24	INT; 9													8th	223
2008	Red Bull-Amir Nasr	Chevrolet Astra	INT; Ret	BRA; 11	CUR; 11	SCZ; 9	MOU; 19	INT; Ret	RIO; 30	LON; 28	CUR; Ret	BRA; 22	TAR; 16	INT; 17													27th	20
2009	Red Bull Racing	Peugeot 307	INT; 4	CUR; 11	BRA; Ret	SCZ; 5	INT; Ret	SAL; 16	RIO; 1	MOU; 11	CUR; 18	BRA; 6	TAR; 14	INT; 10													9th	234
2010	Red Bull Racing	Peugeot 307	INT; 4	CUR; 12	VEL; 13	RIO; 6	RBP; 4	SAL; 9	INT; 7	**MOU**; DSQ	LON; Ret	SCZ; 23	BRA; 4	CUR; 13													9th	224
2011	Red Bull Racing	Peugeot 408	CUR; 15	INT; 2	RBP; Ret	VEL; 19	MOU; 15	RIO; 11	INT; 2	SAL; 15	SCZ; Ret	LON; 8	BRA; 22	VEL; 1													5th	240
2012	Red Bull Racing	Chevrolet Sonic	INT; 6	CUR; 6	VEL; 4	RBP; 1	LON; 3	RIO; 13	SAL; Ret	MOU; 17	TAR; 3	CUR; 3	BRA; 7	INT; 12													4th	169
2013	Red Bull Racing	Chevrolet Sonic	INT; 4	CUR; 1	**TAR**; 1	SAL; 12	BRA; 2	CAS; 5	RBP; 25	CAS; 2	VEL; 1	CUR; 3	BRA; 12	INT; Ret													4th	181
2014	Red Bull Racing	Chevrolet Sonic	INT; 1; 5	SCZ; 1; 19	SCZ; 2; 2	BRA; 1; 16	BRA; 2; 5	GOI; 1 Ret	GOI; 2 DNS	GOI; 1; 25	CAS; 1 Ret	CAS; 2; 12	**CUR**; **1**; 1	CUR; 2; 6	VEL; 1; 3	VEL; 2; 7	SCZ; 1; 2	SCZ; 2; 8	TAR; 1; 17	TAR; 2 Ret	SAL; 1; 12	SAL; 2; 9	CUR; 1; 1				5th	182
2015	Red Bull Racing	Chevrolet Sonic	GOI; 1; 12	RBP; 1 Ret	RBP; 2 DNS	VEL; 1; 1	VEL; 2; 4	CUR; 1; 1	CUR; 2 Ret	SCZ; 1; 10	**SCZ**; **2**; 2	CUR; 1; 3	CUR; 2; 4	GOI; 1; 2	CAS; 1; 25	CAS; 2 DNS	MOU; 1; 7	MOU; 2; 6	CUR; 1 Ret	CUR; 2 Ret	TAR; 1; 8	TAR; 2; 3	INT; 1 Ret				6th	181
2016	Red Bull Racing	Chevrolet Cruze	CUR; 1; 4	VEL; 1; 2	VEL; 2; 6	GOI; 1; 19	GOI; 2 Ret	SCZ; 1; 3	SCZ; 2; 12	TAR; 1; 4	TAR; 2; 13	CAS; 1; 10	**CAS**; **2**; 21†	INT; 1; 8	LON; 1; 20	LON; 2 Ret	CUR; 1; 4	CUR; 2; 13	GOI; 1; 7	GOI; 2; 15	CRI; 1 Ret	CRI; 2; 3	INT; 1; 1				3rd	229
2017	Eurofarma RC	Chevrolet Cruze	**GOI**; **1**; 1	GOI; 2; 6	VEL; 1; 4	VEL; 2; 7	SCZ; 1; 6	SCZ; 2; 17	CAS; 1; 2	CAS; 2; 15	**CUR**; **1**; 1	CRI; 1; 2	CRI; 2; 6	VCA; 1; 8	VCA; 2; 2	LON; 1; 2	LON; 2 Ret	**ARG**; **1**; 3	ARG; 2; 21	TAR; 1; 1	TAR; 2; 22	**GOI**; **1**; 1	GOI; 2; 9	INT; 1; 3			1st	371
2018	Eurofarma RC	Chevrolet Cruze	**INT**; **1**; 1	CUR; 1; 2	CUR; 2; 10	VEL; 1; 8	VEL; 2; 1	LON; 1; 3	LON; 2; 3	SCZ; 1; 2	SCZ; 2; 5	**GOI**; **1**; 8	**MOU**; **1**; 2	MOU; 2 DSQ	CAS; 1 Ret	CAS; 2; 13	VCA; 1; 2	VCA; 2; 2	TAR; 1; 4	TAR; 2; 2	**GOI**; **1**; 3	GOI; 2; 6	INT; 1; 4				1st	338
2019	Eurofarma RC	Chevrolet Cruze	VEL; 1; 1	VCA; 1; 2	VCA; 2; 15	GOI; 1; 3	GOI; 2; 3	LON; 1; 4	LON; 2 Ret	SCZ; 1; 2	SCZ; 2; 7	MOU; 1; 8	MOU; 2; 5	INT; 1; 3	VEL; 1; 9	VEL; 2; 6	CAS; 1; 4	CAS; 2; 14	VCA; 1; 3	VCA; 2; 3	GOI; 1; 4	GOI; 2; 10	INT; 1; 2				1st	387
2020	Eurofarma RC	Chevrolet Cruze	GOI; 1; 4	GOI; 2; 6	INT; 1; 13	INT; 2 DNS	LON; 1; 16	LON; 2; 10	CAS; 1; 2	CAS; 2; 10	CAS; 3; 1	VCA; 1; 9	VCA; 2 Ret	CUR; 1; 3	CUR; 2; 4	CUR; 3; 3	GOI; 1; 3	GOI; 2; 8	GOI; 3; 4	INT; 1; 4							3rd	275
2021	Eurofarma RC	Chevrolet Cruze	GOI; 1; 1	GOI; 2; 7	INT; 1; 24	INT; 2; 2	VCA; 1; 7	VCA; 2; 9	VCA; 1; 4	VCA; 2; 6	CAS; 1; 4	CAS; 2; 11	CUR; 1; 2	CUR; 2; 8	CUR; 1; 2	CUR; 2; 6	GOI; 1; 11	GOI; 2; 10	GOI; 1; 18	GOI; 2 Ret	VCA; 1; 5	VCA; 2; 4	SCZ; 1; 5	SCZ; 2; 10	INT; 1; 2	INT; 2; 4	2nd	354
2022	Eurofarma RC	Chevrolet Cruze	INT; 1; 3	GOI; 1; 16	GOI; 2; 4	**RIO**; **1**; 1	RIO; 2; 8	VCA; 1; 6	VCA; 2; 8	VEL; 1; 4	VEL; 2; 12	VEL; 1; 4	VEL; 2; 11	INT; 1	INT; 2	VCA; 1; 16	VCA; 2; 7	SCZ; 1; 3	SCZ; 2; 5	GOI; 1; 5	GOI; 2; 8	GOI; 1; 10	GOI; 2; 3	INT; 1; 2	INT; 2 Ret		2nd	316
2023	Eurofarma RC	Chevrolet Cruze	GOI; 1; 1	GOI; 2; 8	INT; 1; 26	INT; 2; 11	TAR; 1; 23	TAR; 2; 6	CAS; 1; 1	CAS; 2; 17	INT; 1; 7	INT; 2; 5	VCA; 1; 7	VCA; 2; 3	GOI; 1 Ret	GOI; 2; 5	VEL; 1; 10	VEL; 2 DNS	BUE; 1; 19	BUE; 2 Ret	VCA; 1; 1	VCA; 2; 12	CAS; 1; 2	CAS; 2; 7	INT; 1; 5	INT; 2; 12	2nd	296
2024	Eurofarma RC	Chevrolet Cruze	GOI; 1 Ret	GOI; 2 Ret	VCA; 1; 8	INT; 1; 15	INT; 2; 16	CAS; 1; 7	**CAS**; **2**; 21	VCA; 1; 1	VCA; 2; 12	VCA; 3; 17	GOI; 1; 5	GOI; 2; 3	BLH; 1; 11	**BLH**; **2**; 10	VEL; 1; 6	VEL; 2; 8	BUE; 1; 1	BUE; 2; 25†	URU; 1; 2	URU; 2; 21	GOI; 1; 15	GOI; 2; 4	INT; 1; 26†	INT; 2; 4	8th	779
2025	Blau Motorsport	Mitsubishi Eclipse Cross	INT; 1; 23	CAS; 1; 25	CAS; 2; 3	VEL; 1 Ret	VEL; 2; 18	VCA; 1; 16	VCA; 2; 11	CRS; 1; 16	CRS; 2; 12	CAS; 1; 5	CAS; 2; 7	VCA; 1; 15	VCA; 2; 7	VCA; 1 Ret	VCA; 2 Ret	MOU; 1; 9	MOU; 2; 27	CUI; 1; 23	CUI; 2; 20	BRA; 1; 4	BRA; 2; 23	INT; 1 Ret	INT; 2 Ret		20th	457
2026	Blau Motorsport	Mitsubishi Eclipse Cross	CRS; 1; 9	CRS; 2; 4	SCZ; 1 Ret	SCZ; 2 Ret	INT; 1 DNS	INT; 2; 15	GOI; 1; 20	GOI; 2; 22	CUI; 1; 10	CUI; 2; 3	VCA; 1; 13	VCA; 2; 24	SCZ; 1; 12	SCZ; 2; 13	CRS; 1; 23	CRS; 2; 12	BRA; 1; 22	CAS; 1; 2	CAS; 2; 8	VEL; 1	INT; 1	INT; 2			15th*	468*

^{†} Did not finish the race, but was classified as he completed over 90% of the race distance. ^{*} Season still in progress.

=== Complete European Le Mans Series results ===
(key) (Races in bold indicate pole position; results in italics indicate fastest lap)

Year	Entrant	Class	Chassis	Engine	1	2	3	4	5	6	Rank	Points
2007	JMB Racing	GT2	Ferrari F430 GTC	Ferrari F136 GT 4.0 L V8	MNZ	VAL	NÜR	SPA	SIL	MIL; 6	25th	3
2020	AF Corse	LMGTE	Ferrari 488 GTE Evo	Ferrari F154CB 3.9 L Turbo V8	LEC	SPA	LEC; 6	MNZ	ALG		17th	8
2023	Kessel Racing	LMGTE	Ferrari 488 GTE Evo	Ferrari F154CB 3.9 L Turbo V8	CAT	LEC	ARA	SPA; 5	ALG; 4	ALG; 12	14th	22
2024	Kessel Racing	LMGT3	Ferrari 296 GT3	Ferrari F163 3.0 L Turbo V6	CAT; 9	LEC; Ret	IMO; 4	SPA; 1	MUG; 1	ALG; 5	2nd	74
2025	Kessel Racing	LMGT3	Ferrari 296 GT3	Ferrari F163CE 3.0 L Turbo V6	CAT; 2	LEC	IMO; Ret	SPA	SIL; 4†	ALG; 7	13th	24
2026	Kessel Racing	LMGT3	Ferrari 296 GT3 Evo	Ferrari F163CE 3.0 L Turbo V6	CAT; 3	LEC; 1	IMO; 11	SPA; Ret	SIL; 4	ALG; 13	6th	52

^{†} Serra was not awarded points as he did not complete the minimum drive time. ^{*} Season still in progress.

=== Complete FIA GT1 World Championship results ===
Year	Team	Car	1	2	3	4	5	6	7	8	9	10	11	12	13	14	15	16	17	18	19	20	Pos	Points
2010	Triple H Team Hegersport	Maserati MC12 GT1	ABU; QR	ABU; CR	SIL; QR	SIL; CR	BRN; QR	BRN; CR	PRI; QR	PRI; CR	SPA; QR	SPA; CR	NÜR; QR	NÜR; CR	ALG; QR	ALG; CR	NAV; QR	NAV; CR	INT; QR; 16	INT; CR; 17	SAN; QR	SAN; CR	57th	0

=== Complete IMSA SportsCar Championship results ===
(key) (Races in bold indicate pole position; races in italics indicate fastest lap)

Year	Team	Class	Make	Engine	1	2	3	4	5	6	7	8	9	10	11	12	Pos.	Points	Ref
2014	Scuderia Corsa	GTD	Ferrari 458 Italia GT3	Ferrari F136 4.5L V8	DAY; 10	SEB	LGA	DET	WGL	MOS	IMS	ELK	VIR	COA	PET		73rd	23	
2015	Scuderia Corsa	GTD	Ferrari 458 Italia GT3	Ferrari F136 4.5L V8	DAY; 14†	SEB	LGA	DET	WGL	LIM	ELK	VIR	COA	PET; 6			40th	27	
2016	Scuderia Corsa	GTLM	Ferrari 488 GTE	Ferrari F154CB 3.9 L Turbo V8	DAY; 4	SEB; 7	LBH; 6	**LGA**; 2	WGL; 5	MOS	LIM	ELK	VIR	COA	PET; 8		10th	164	
2018	Spirit of Race	GTD	Ferrari 488 GT3	Ferrari F154CB 3.9 L Turbo V8	**DAY**; 21	**SEB**; 12	MDO	DET									29th	77	
2018	Squadra Corse Garage Italia	GTD	Ferrari 488 GT3	Ferrari F154CB 3.9 L Turbo V8					WGL; 18	MOS	LIM	ELK	VIR	LGA			29th	77	
2018	Scuderia Corsa	GTD	Ferrari 488 GT3	Ferrari F154CB 3.9 L Turbo V8											PET; 1		29th	77	
2019	Spirit of Race	GTD	Ferrari 488 GT3	Ferrari F154CB 3.9 L Turbo V8	DAY; 20	SEB		MDO	DET	WGL	MOS	LIM	ELK	VIR	LGA		67th	11	
2019	Risi Competizione	GTLM	Ferrari 488 GTE	Ferrari F154CB 3.9 L Turbo V8			LBH									**PET**; 1	22nd	35	
2020	Risi Competizione	GTLM	Ferrari 488 GTE	Ferrari F154CB 3.9 L Turbo V8	DAY; 6	DAY	SEB	ELK	VIR	ATL	MDO	CLT	PET	LGA	SEB		16th	25	
2021	AF Corse	GTD	Ferrari 488 GT3 Evo 2020	Ferrari F154CB 3.9 L Turbo V8	DAY; 8	SEB	MDO	DET	WGL	WGL	LIM	ELK	LGA	LBH	VIR	PET	55th	246	
2022	Risi Competizione	GTD Pro	Ferrari 488 GT3 Evo 2020	Ferrari F154CB 3.9 L Turbo V8	DAY; 2	**SEB**; 9	LBH	LGA	WGL; 2	MOS	LIM	ELK	VIR	PET; 7			8th	1213	
2023	Risi Competizione	GTD Pro	Ferrari 296 GT3	Ferrari F163CE 3.0 L Turbo V6	DAY; 10	SEB; 6	LBH	LGA	**WGL**; 2	MOS	LIM	ELK	VIR	IMS	PET; 3		6th	1192	
2024	Risi Competizione	GTD Pro	Ferrari 296 GT3	Ferrari F163CE 3.0 L Turbo V6	DAY; 1	SEB; 2	LGA		**WGL**; 11	MOS			IMS; 9	PET; 2			11th	2186	
2024	Conquest Racing	GTD Pro	Ferrari 296 GT3	Ferrari F163CE 3.0 L Turbo V6				DET; 7			ELK; 1	VIR					11th	2186	
2025	Conquest Racing	GTD	Ferrari 296 GT3	Ferrari F163CE 3.0 L Turbo V6	DAY; 11	SEB; 7	LBH; 16	LGA; 3	WGL; 10	MOS; 11	ELK; 3	VIR; 6	IMS; 3	PET; 16			7th	2534	
2026	Risi Competizione	GTD Pro	Ferrari 296 GT3 Evo	Ferrari F163CE 3.0 L Turbo V6	DAY; 15	SEB; 13	LGA	DET	WGL; 5	MOS	ELK; 8	VIR	IMS	PET; 5			12th	1206	

^{†} Serra did not complete sufficient laps in order to score full points.

=== Complete 24 Hours of Daytona results ===
Year	Team	Co-Drivers	Car	Class	Laps	Pos.	Class Pos.
2013	(United States) Scuderia Corsa	(Brazil) Francisco Longo (Brazil) Raphael Matos (Brazil) Xandinho Negrão	Ferrari 458 Italia Grand-Am	GT	576	38th	24th
2014	(United States) Scuderia Corsa	(Brazil) Francisco Longo (Brazil) Marcos Gomes (Brazil) Xandinho Negrão	Ferrari 458 Italia GT3	GTD	649	29th	10th
2015	(United States) Scuderia Corsa	(Brazil) Francisco Longo (Brazil) Marcos Gomes (Italy) Andrea Bertolini	Ferrari 458 Italia GT3	GTD	545	32nd	14th
2016	(United States) Scuderia Corsa	(Italy) Alessandro Pier Guidi (France) Alexandre Prémat (Mexico) Memo Rojas	Ferrari 488 GTE	GTLM	721	10th	4th
2018	(Switzerland) Spirit of Race	(Canada) Paul Dalla Lana (Portugal) Pedro Lamy (Austria) Mathias Lauda	Ferrari 488 GT3	GTD	571	44th	21st
2019	(Switzerland) Spirit of Race	(Canada) Paul Dalla Lana (Portugal) Pedro Lamy (Austria) Mathias Lauda	Ferrari 488 GT3	GTD	349	DNF	DNF
2020	(United States) Risi Competizione	(United Kingdom) James Calado (Italy) Alessandro Pier Guidi (Italy) Davide Rigon	Ferrari 488 GT3 Evo	GTLM	738	DNF	DNF
2021	(Italy) AF Corse	(Italy) Matteo Cressoni (Italy) Simon Mann (Denmark) Nicklas Nielsen	Ferrari 488 GT3 Evo	GTD	743	29th	8th
2022	(United States) Risi Competizione	(United Kingdom) James Calado (Italy) Alessandro Pier Guidi (Italy) Davide Rigon	Ferrari 488 GT3 Evo	GTD Pro	711	19th	2nd
2023	(United States) Risi Competizione	(United Kingdom) James Calado (Italy) Alessandro Pier Guidi (Italy) Davide Rigon	Ferrari 296 GT3	GTD Pro	349	DNF	DNF
2024	(United States) Risi Competizione	(United Kingdom) James Calado (Italy) Alessandro Pier Guidi (Italy) Davide Rigon	Ferrari 296 GT3	GTD Pro	733	17th	**1st**
2025	(United States) Conquest Racing	(Italy) Giacomo Altoè (United States) Manny Franco (Monaco) Cédric Sbirrazzuoli	Ferrari 296 GT3	GTD	673	40th	11th
2026	(United States) Risi Competizione	(Italy) Alessandro Pier Guidi (Italy) Davide Rigon	Ferrari 296 GT3 Evo	GTD Pro	62	DNF	DNF

=== Complete FIA World Endurance Championship results ===
(key) (Races in bold indicate pole position; races in italics indicate fastest lap)

Year	Entrant	Class	Car	Engine	1	2	3	4	5	6	7	8	9	Rank	Points
2017	Aston Martin Racing	LMGTE Pro	Aston Martin Vantage GTE	Aston Martin 4.5 L V8	SIL; 7	SPA; 7	**LMS**; 1	NÜR; 7	MEX; Ret	COA; 5	FUJ	SHA	BHR	9th	79
2018–19	AF Corse	LMGTE Pro	Ferrari 488 GTE Evo	Ferrari F154CB 3.9 L Turbo V8	SPA	LMS; 4	SIL	FUJ	SHA	SEB; 4	SPA	LMS; 1		6th	71
2019–20	AF Corse	LMGTE Pro	Ferrari 488 GTE Evo	Ferrari F154CB 3.9 L Turbo V8	SIL	FUJ	SHA	BHR	COA	SPA	LMS; 2	BHR; 12		14th	37
2021	AF Corse	LMGTE Pro	Ferrari 488 GTE Evo	Ferrari F154CB 3.9 L Turbo V8	SPA; 3	ALG; 2	MNZ; 4	**LMS**; 10	BHR; 4	BHR; 3				4th	92
2022	AF Corse	LMGTE Pro	Ferrari 488 GTE Evo	Ferrari F154CB 3.9 L Turbo V8	SEB	SPA	LMS; 2	MNZ	FUJ	BHR				11th	36
2023	Kessel Racing	LMGTE Am	Ferrari 488 GTE Evo	Ferrari F154CB 3.9 L Turbo V8	SEB; 3	ALG; 10	SPA; 8	LMS; Ret	MNZ	FUJ	BHR; 5			11th	43

=== Complete 24 Hours of Le Mans results ===
Year	Team	Co-Drivers	Car	Class	Laps	Pos.	Class Pos.
2017	(United Kingdom) Aston Martin Racing	(United Kingdom) Darren Turner (United Kingdom) Jonathan Adam	Aston Martin Vantage GTE	GTE; Pro	340	17th	**1st**
2018	(Italy) AF Corse	(United Kingdom) James Calado (Italy) Alessandro Pier Guidi	Ferrari 488 GTE Evo	GTE; Pro	339	22nd	7th
2019	(Italy) AF Corse	(United Kingdom) James Calado (Italy) Alessandro Pier Guidi	Ferrari 488 GTE Evo	GTE; Pro	342	20th	**1st**
2020	(Italy) AF Corse	(United Kingdom) James Calado (Italy) Alessandro Pier Guidi	Ferrari 488 GTE Evo	GTE; Pro	346	21st	**2nd**
2021	(Italy) AF Corse	(United Kingdom) Sam Bird (Spain) Miguel Molina	Ferrari 488 GTE Evo	GTE; Pro	331	37th	5th
2022	(Italy) AF Corse	(United Kingdom) James Calado (Italy) Alessandro Pier Guidi	Ferrari 488 GTE Evo	GTE; Pro	350	29th	**2nd**
2023	(Switzerland) Kessel Racing	(United States) Scott Huffaker (Japan) Takeshi Kimura	Ferrari 488 GTE Evo	GTE; Am	254	DNF	DNF
2024	(United Kingdom) GR Racing	(Italy) Riccardo Pera (United Kingdom) Michael Wainwright	Ferrari 296 GT3	LMGT3	278	39th	12th
2025	(Switzerland) Kessel Racing	(Japan) Takeshi Kimura (United Kingdom) Casper Stevenson	Ferrari 296 GT3	LMGT3	339	40th	8th
2026	(Switzerland) Kessel Racing	(Japan) Takeshi Kimura (Denmark) Conrad Laursen	Ferrari 296 GT3 Evo	LMGT3	334	42nd	10th

=== Complete GT World Challenge Europe results ===
==== GT World Challenge Europe Endurance Cup ====
(key) (Races in bold indicate pole position; races in italics indicate fastest lap)

Year	Team	Car	Class	1	2	3	4	5	6	7	Pos.	Points
2018	Belgian Audi Club Team WRT	Audi R8 LMS	Pro	MNZ	SIL	LEC	SPA; 6H; 60	SPA; 12H; 60	SPA; 24H; Ret	CAT	NC	0
2019	HubAuto Racing	Ferrari 488 GT3	Pro	MNZ	SIL	LEC	SPA; 6H; 69	SPA; 12H; 69	SPA; 24H; Ret	CAT	NC	0
2020	AF Corse	Ferrari 488 GT3	Pro-Am	IMO	NÜR	SPA; 6H; 32	SPA; 12H; 29	SPA; 24H; 35	LEC		19th	16
2022	Iron Lynx	Ferrari 488 GT3 Evo 2020	Pro	IMO; 8	**LEC**; 1	SPA; 6H; 2	SPA; 12H; 4	SPA; 24H; 3	HOC	CAT	3rd	68
2023	AF Corse - Francorchamps Motors	Ferrari 296 GT3	Pro	MNZ	LEC; 5	SPA; 6H; 7	SPA; 12H; 17	SPA; 24H; 11	NÜR; 14	CAT; 2	10th	33

=== Complete Asian Le Mans Series results ===
(key) (Races in bold indicate pole position; races in italics indicate fastest lap)

Year	Team	Class	Car	Engine	1	2	3	4	5	6	Pos.	Points
2019–20	Spirit of Race	GT	Ferrari 488 GT3	Ferrari F154CB 3.9 L Turbo V8	SHA	BEN	CHA	SEP; 3			15th	15
2024–25	CarGuy Racing	GT	Ferrari 296 GT3	Ferrari F163CE 3.0 L Turbo V6	SEP; 1; 1	SEP; 2 Ret	DUB; 1; 11	DUB; 2; 11	ABU; 1 Ret	ABU; 2; 6	8th	34

=== Complete Bathurst 12 Hour results ===
Year	Team	Co-Drivers	Car	Class	Laps	Pos.	Class Pos.
2020	(Chinese Taipei) HubAuto Corsa	(Brazil) Marcos Gomes (Australia) Tim Slade	Ferrari 488 GT3	APP	—N/a	WD	WD
2025	(Australia) Arise Racing GT	(Australia) Will Brown (Australia) Chaz Mostert	Ferrari 296 GT3	Pro	306	4th	4th
2026	(Australia) Arise Racing GT	(Australia) Jaxon Evans (Italy) Davide Rigon	Ferrari 296 GT3	Pro	262	9th	7th

Sporting positions
Preceded by Inaugural	Desafio Internacional das Estrelas; Winner; 2005	Succeeded by Felipe Massa
Preceded by Felipe Fraga	Stock Car Brasil; Champion; 2017, 2018, 2019	Succeeded by Ricardo Maurício
Preceded by Nick Tandy; Tommy Milner (GTLM)	Michelin Endurance Cup; GTD Pro Champion; 2022; With: Davide Rigon	Succeeded by Jules Gounon; Daniel Juncadella
