= Rafa Reis =

Brazilian racing driver (born 2006)

- Nationality: Brazilian
- Born: 3 October 2001 (age 25) São Paulo, Brazil

Rafael França De Oliveira Reis "Rafa Reis" (born 3 October 2001) is a Brazilian racing driver who is set to compete with CAR Racing in Stock Car Pro Series. He debuted in the series in 2025. His brother Léo Reis is also a racing driver.
