= Autódromo Internacional de Chapecó =

Motor racing track in Chapecó, Santa Catarina, Brazil

Autódromo Internacional de Chapecó Márcio Vaccaro
- Location: Chapecó, Santa Catarina, Brazil
- Coordinates: 27°06′59″S 52°38′27″W
- Operator: Automóvel Clube Chapecó
- Broke ground: 11 September 2023; 3 years ago
- Opened: 30 October 2026; 13 days ago
- Construction cost: R$ 125 million
- Architect: Heinz Jakob Scheuren
- Major events: Current: Copa Truck (2026); NASCAR Brasil Series (2026); Future: Fórmula Truck (2027)

Full Circuit (2026)
- Length: 4.004 km (2.488 mi)
- Turns: 12
- Race lap record: 2:02.446 ( (Brazil) Leandro Totti, Copa Truck, 2026, Truck racing)

Oval Circuit (2026)
- Length: 1.452 km (0.902 mi)
- Turns: 2
- Race lap record: 0:37.062 ( (Brazil) Gabriel Casagrande, Chevrolet Camaro NASCAR Brasil, 2026, NASCAR Brasil)

External Circuit (2026)
- Length: 2.520 km (1.566 mi)
- Turns: 9

Motorcycling Circuit (2026)
- Length: 2.829 km (1.758 mi)
- Turns: 10

The Autódromo Internacional de Chapecó Márcio Vaccaro is a motorsports circuit opened in 2026, located in Chapecó. The circuit has length of 4.004 km (2.488 mi), and has four different layouts.

The circuit was projected in 2021 and publicly presented in August 2026.

The circuit was officially opened in November 2026 with the races of NASCAR Brasil Series and Copa Truck.

== Lap records ==
As of November 2026, the fastest official lap records at the Autódromo Internacional de Chapecó are listed as:

| Category | Time | Driver | Vehicle | Event |
Full Circuit (2026): 4.004 km (2.488 mi)
| Truck racing | 2:02.446 | Leandro Totti | Iveco Truck | 2026 Chapecó Copa Truck round |
Oval Circuit (2026): 1.452 km (0.902 mi)
| NASCAR Brasil | 0:37.062 | Gabriel Casagrande | Chevrolet Camaro NASCAR Brasil | 2026 Chapecó NASCAR Brasil round |
