= FuelTech =

Brazilian motorsport-electronics company

- Company type: Private
- Industry: Automotive electronics • Motorsport technology
- Founded: April 23, 2003; 23 years ago
- Founder: Anderson Frederico Dick
- Headquarters: Porto Alegre, Rio Grande do Sul, Brazil
- Area served: Worldwide
- Key people: Anderson Dick (Global CEO); Leonardo Prianti Fontolan (CEO Brazil); Luis de Leon (COO)
- Products: Engine-management systems (ECUs), ignition modules, software
- Number of employees: ~200 (2023)
- Website: fueltech.net

FuelTech is a Brazilian manufacturer of high-performance engine-management and motorsport-electronics systems. Headquartered in Porto Alegre, the company ignition modules and software for drag-racing.

It was founded in 2003 by electrical engineer Anderson Frederico Dick. After dominating the Brazilian performance market in the 2000s, the firm expanded abroad, establishing FuelTech USA in Georgia and building a dealer network on six continents. Its PowerFT line (e.g., FT500, FT600) and next-generation VisionFT line (FT700 family) power numerous championship-winning drag cars and, since 2025, the entire Stock Car Pro Series grid.

== History ==
=== Founding and early years (1999–2006) ===
FuelTech traces its roots to 1999, when Dick—then an engineering student at the Federal University of Rio Grande do Sul—built a turbo-fuel controller nicknamed TurboPro. Working from an 8 m² dorm room, he hand-assembled TurboPRO-1F units that managed only fuel injection. FuelTech was registered on 23 April 2003.

By 2007 the firm held an estimated 70% share of South America’s high-performance ECU market and employed about 25 staff.

=== Expansion to international markets (2007–2014) ===
Dick began visiting U.S. drag-racing events in 2007. Satellite offices (2009–2011) produced few sales as racers doubted the all-in-one design.

A 2012 meeting with Pro Line Racing led to joint development of the FT500 (launched 2014) and the opening of FuelTech USA in Ball Ground, Georgia.

=== Product evolution (2015–2020) ===
- FT600 (2016) — waterproof 68-pin ECU, higher I/O and processing.
- FT550 / FT450 — mid-range models completing the PowerFT family.

PowerFT units share the FTManager Windows suite and an on-unit touchscreen that integrates data-logger, dash, boost and traction control. By 2020 FuelTech had dealers in 20+ countries, growth achieved without outside investors.

=== Recent developments (2021–2025) ===
- April 2024 floods submerged the facility; operations resumed after a global relief drive.
- May 2025 — FT700 Plus becomes the spec VCU for Stock Car Pro Series.

== Products and technology ==
=== Engine-management line ===
Generation / family	Model(s)	Notes
TurboPRO-1F	TurboPRO-1F	Fuel-only controller (c. 2000 – 2003)
VisionFT	FT700 · FT700 Plus	Wi-Fi, 12.3-inch display (Plus), new Vision software (2023 – )

=== Ignition & spark energy ===
- IGN1A Smart Coil (Motorsport-style coil-on-plug)

== See also ==
- Electronic control unit
- Engine management system
- Drag racing
