= Pole Motorsport =

Brazilian racing team

(Brazil) Pole Motorsport
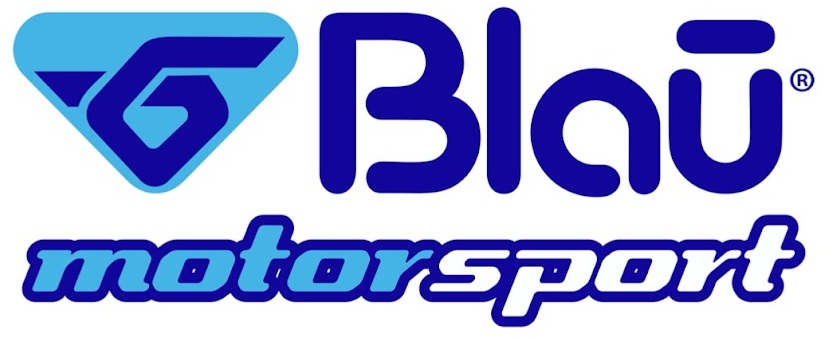
- Founded: 2018
- Nation: Brazil
- Base: Pinhais, Paraná, Brazil
- Team principal(s): Joselmo Barcik
- Current series: Stock Car Pro Series; NASCAR Brasil Series
- Noted drivers: Daniel Serra; Allam Khodair
- Website: https://www.grandepremio.com.br/equipe/stock-car/2022/rkl-competicoes/

Pole Motorsport is a Brazilian professional auto racing team based in Pinhais, Paraná. It currently competes in Stock Car Pro Series under the Blau Motorsport name. The team debuted in the series in 2021 in a partnership with Shell oil company. Pole announced the entry in NASCAR Brasil Series in January; being the fifth private team in the grid, they will field four cars in the grid.

== See also ==
- Blau Motorsport
