= Felipe Baptista =

Brazilian racing driver (born 2003)

- Nationality: Brazilian
- Born: 8 April 2003 (age 23) Jundiaí, São Paulo, Brazil

Stock Car Pro Series career
- Debut season: 2022
- Current team: CAR Racing
- Categorisation: FIA Silver
- Car number: 121
- Former teams: KTF Sports, Crown Racing
- Starts: 101
- Wins: 4
- Podiums: 10
- Poles: 3
- Best finish: 6th in 2024

Championship titles
- 2022: Stock Light

Felipe Baptista (born 8 April 2003) is a Brazilian racing driver currently competing in Stock Car Pro Series with KTF Sports. He was the 2022 Stock Light season champion. Felipe Baptista began his full-time participation in the Stock Car Pro Series in 2023, driving car number 121 for KTF Sports. and winning his first race at his debut season. In 2024, driving for Crown Racing in the Stock Car Pro Series, Baptista delivered a standout performance, concluding the championship in sixth place with 806 points.

For 2025 onwards, Baptista returned to the team with which he made his Stock Car Pro Series debut. The former KTF Sports. was acquired and transitioned into CAR Racing, expanding to become the largest motorsport operation in the Brazilian racing scene..
