= Scuderia Bandeiras =

Brazilian racing team

(Brazil) Scuderia Bandeiras
- Founded: 2024
- Nation: Brazil
- Base: São Paulo, Brazil
- Team principal(s): Atila Abreu
- Current series: Stock Car Pro Series
- Website: www.grandepremio.com.br/equipe/stock-car/2022/rkl-competicoes/

Scuderia Bandeiras is a Brazilian professional auto racing team based in São Paulo, Brazil created by Brazilian racing driver Atila Abreu. The team debuted in the Stock Car Pro Series in 2025. Bandeiras announced Rubens Barrichello as a new driver.

== See also ==
- Atila Abreu
