= Crown Racing =

Brazilian auto racing team

(Brazil) Crown Racing
- Founded: 2013
- Team principal(s): William Lube
- Current series: Stock Car Brasil
- Noted drivers: Stock Car Pro Series; 28. Enzo Elias; 33. Nelson Piquet Jr.
- Drivers' Championships: Stock Car Pro Series; 2015. Marcos Gomes; 2016. Felipe Fraga; Jaguar I-Pace eTrophy; 2018–19. Sérgio Jimenez
- Website: http://www.cimedracing.com/

Crown Racing (previously known as Voxx Racing and Cimed Racing), is a Brazilian auto racing team originally based in Petropolis, Rio de Janeiro, which is now headquartered at the Autódromo Velo Città in Mogi Guaçu, São Paulo. Originally found in 2013 by William Lube and the Cimed group, Crown Racing has competed in the Stock Car Pro Series since 2013 and has won the championship two times, in 2015 with Marcos Gomes, and in 2016 with Felipe Fraga.

== History ==
The team was founded in 2013 as Voxx Racing. In 2016, the team won that years' championship with Felipe Fraga. For the 2019 season, the team created a second team called Crown Racing. The Cimed team stopped competing before the 2020 season, with its "B" team, Crown Racing, taking over both operations. In 2021, Crown Racing inaugurated a new base of operations at the Autódromo Velo Città.

== Jaguar I-Pace eTrophy ==
The team was selected to represented Brazil in the inaugural season of Jaguar I-Pace eTrophy with Sérgio Jimenez and Cacá Bueno as Jaguar Brazil Racing
