= Autódromo Internacional de Mato Grosso =

Race track in Cuiabá, Brazil

- Location: Cuiabá, Mato Grosso, Brazil
- Coordinates: 15°27′08″S 56°05′08″W
- Opened: 14 November 2025; 8 months ago
- Former names: Autódromo Internacional de Cuiabá
- Major events: Current: TCR South America (2025–present); Stock Car Pro Series (2025–present); TCR Brazil (2025–present); NASCAR Brasil Series (2026); Copa Truck (2026); Fórmula Truck (2026)

Full Circuit (2025–present)
- Length: 4.450 km (2.765 mi)
- Turns: 13
- Race lap record: 1:46.942 ( (Brazil) Felipe Massa, Chevrolet Tracker, 2026, Stock Car Pro)

External Circuit (2025–present)
- Length: 2.800 km (1.740 mi)
- Turns: 4
- Race lap record: 0:58.768 ( (Brazil) Murilo Rocha, Ford Mustang NASCAR Brasil, 2026, NASCAR Brasil)

The Autódromo Internacional de Mato Grosso is a 4.450 km (2.765 mi) race track located in the Brazilian city of Cuiabá, in the state of Mato Grosso. It was opened in November 2025 with the races of Stock Car Pro Series in which the race was announced in previous month.

The circuit is located in the event area of Parque Novo Mato Grosso and has also the external circuit layout, which has a length of 2.800 km (1.740 mi).

== Events ==
Current

- June: TCR South America Touring Car Championship, Stock Car Pro Series, Stock Light, TCR Brasil Touring Car Championship, Fórmula Truck, Turismo Nacional BR
- August: NASCAR Brasil Series, Copa Truck

== Lap records ==
As of August 2026, the fastest official lap records at the Autódromo Internacional de Mato Grosso are listed as:

Category	Time	Driver	Vehicle	Event
Full Circuit (2025–present): 4.450 km (2.765 mi)
Stock Car Pro	1:46.942	Felipe Massa	Chevrolet Tracker	2026 Cuiabá Stock Car Pro round
TCR Touring Car	1:52.381	Erick Schotten	Cupra León VZ TCR	2026 Cuiabá TCR South America round
Stock Light	1:53.251	Vinicius Paparelli	Chevrolet Cruze JL-G12	2026 Cuiabá Stock Light round
Turismo Nacional BR	2:10.028	Adilson Junior	Chevrolet New Onix	2026 Cuiabá Turismo Nacional Brasil round
Truck racing	2:21.685	Leandro Totti	Iveco Truck	2026 Cuiabá Copa Truck round
External Circuit (2025–present): 2.800 km (1.740 mi)
NASCAR Brasil	0:58.768	Murilo Rocha	Ford Mustang NASCAR Brasil	2026 Cuiabá NASCAR Brasil round
