= KTF Sports =

(Brazil) CAR Racing
- Founded: 2018
- Team principal(s): Lincoln Oliveira (former); Leandro Reis
- Current series: Stock Car Pro Series; Stock Light; Turismo Nacional; Kart
- Current drivers: Rafael Reis Leonardo Reis; Felipe Baptista Vicente Orige
- Drivers' Championships: Stock Light; 2019. Guilherme Salas; 2020. Pietro Rimbano; 2021. Felipe Baptista
- Website: https://www.instagram.com/ktfsports/

CAR Racing (formerly known as KTF Sports) is a Brazilian auto racing team based in Cotia, São Paulo. The organization originally made its Stock Car Pro Series debut in 2018 under the KTF name. Following an acquisition, the team underwent a complete rebranding process to become CAR Racing, while retaining its original infrastructure, technical staff, and motorsport legacy.

Currently operating as the largest motorsport structure in Brazil, CAR Racing competes across multiple national categories. In addition to the premier Stock Car Pro Series, the team fields entries in Stock Light and Turismo Nacional. Furthermore, the organization manages the most extensive professional karting operation in the country.

== CAR Racing ==
Since 2025 the team started a union with Brazilian Kart team CAR Racing and was renamed to CAR Racing
