= Chevrolet Sonic (crossover) =

Subcompact crossover SUV

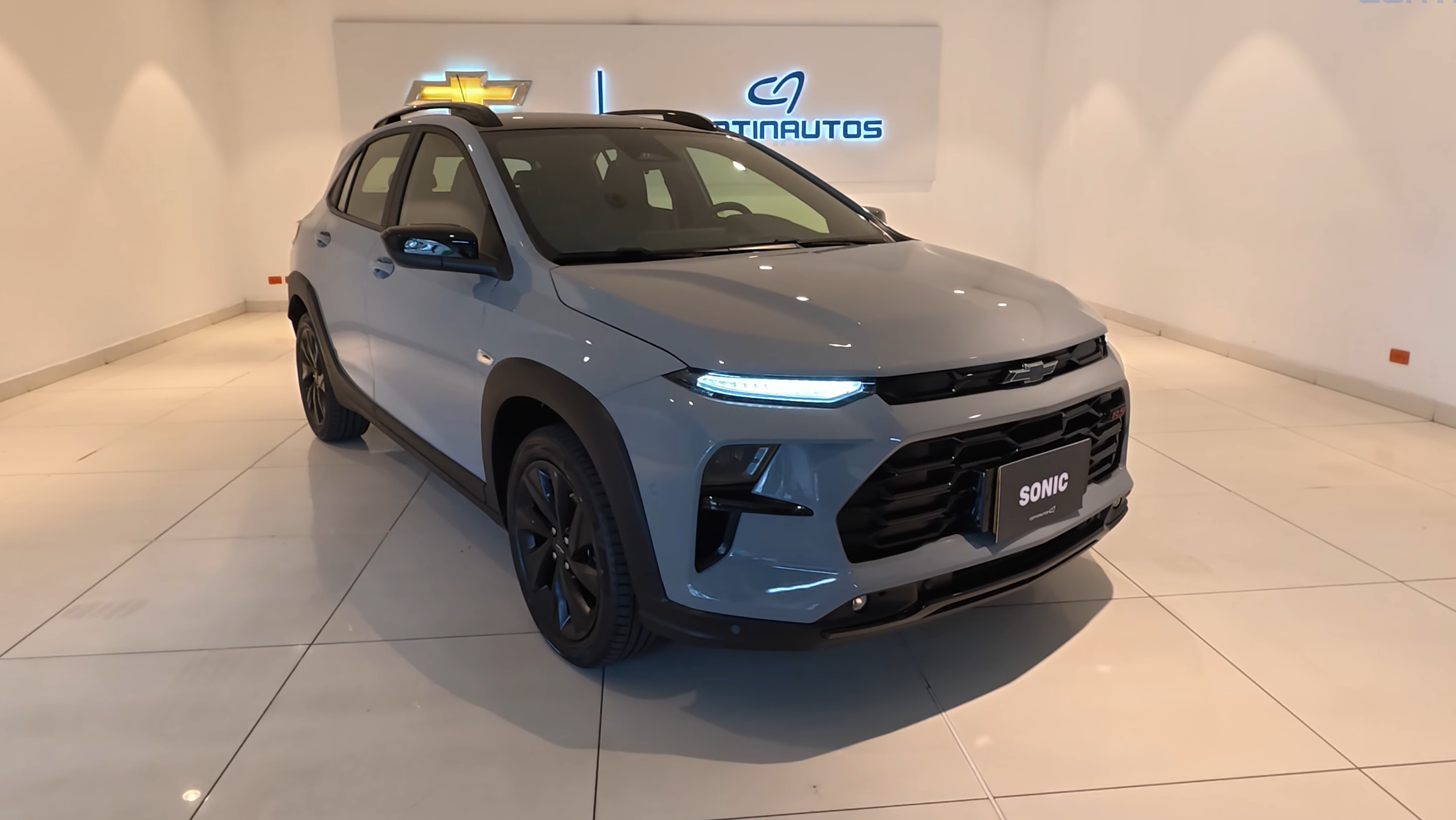

Overview
- Manufacturer: Chevrolet (General Motors do Brasil)
- Model code: Project Carbon
- Production: 2026–present
- Assembly: Brazil: Gravataí, Rio Grande do Sul (GM Brazil)

Body and chassis
- Class: Subcompact crossover SUV
- Body style: 5‑door SUV
- Layout: Front-engine, front-wheel-drive
- Platform: GM GEM platform
- Related: Chevrolet Onix

Powertrain
- Engine: 1.0 L turboflex I3
- Power output: 115 CV (85 kW; 113 hp)
- Transmission: 6‑speed manual; 6‑speed automatic

Dimensions
- Wheelbase: 2,551 mm (100.4 in)
- Length: 4,228 mm (166.5 in)
- Width: 1,773 mm (69.8 in)
- Height: 1,532 mm (60.3 in)

The Chevrolet Sonic is a subcompact crossover SUV produced by General Motors do Brasil since 2026 under the Chevrolet brand. The model is derived from the Chevrolet Onix family and known internally as Project Carbon.

It was developed to fill the gap between the Onix and the Chevrolet Tracker in the brand’s lineup. Production is confirmed for the Gravataí plant in Rio Grande do Sul, and the commercial debut in Brazil was the first half of 2026, focusing on the South American market. The name revives that of a premium compact sold by Chevrolet in Brazil between 2012 and 2014, built locally and share its platform, engines and components with the Onix.

== History and development ==
Development of the Sonic SUV began in mid‑2023 under the codename "Carbon", as part of a R$1.2 billion investment in the modernization of the Gravataí factory. In November 2025 General Motors officially confirmed the name "Chevrolet Sonic" for the Onix‑derived utility and announced that the vehicle to be produced in Gravataí, sharing the assembly line and the GEM platform with the Onix hatch and Onix Plus. The same plant, inaugurated in 2000 for production of the Celta and currently dedicated to the Onix, manufactures the Sonic as a second high‑volume product.

The Sonic was revealed on 21 April 2026, following the introduction of new generations of the Onix and Tracker in 2025. The model was conceived to compete with entry‑level compact SUVs such as the Fiat Pulse, Renault Kardian and Volkswagen Tera, positioning itself below the Tracker in price and size.

== Design ==
=== Exterior ===
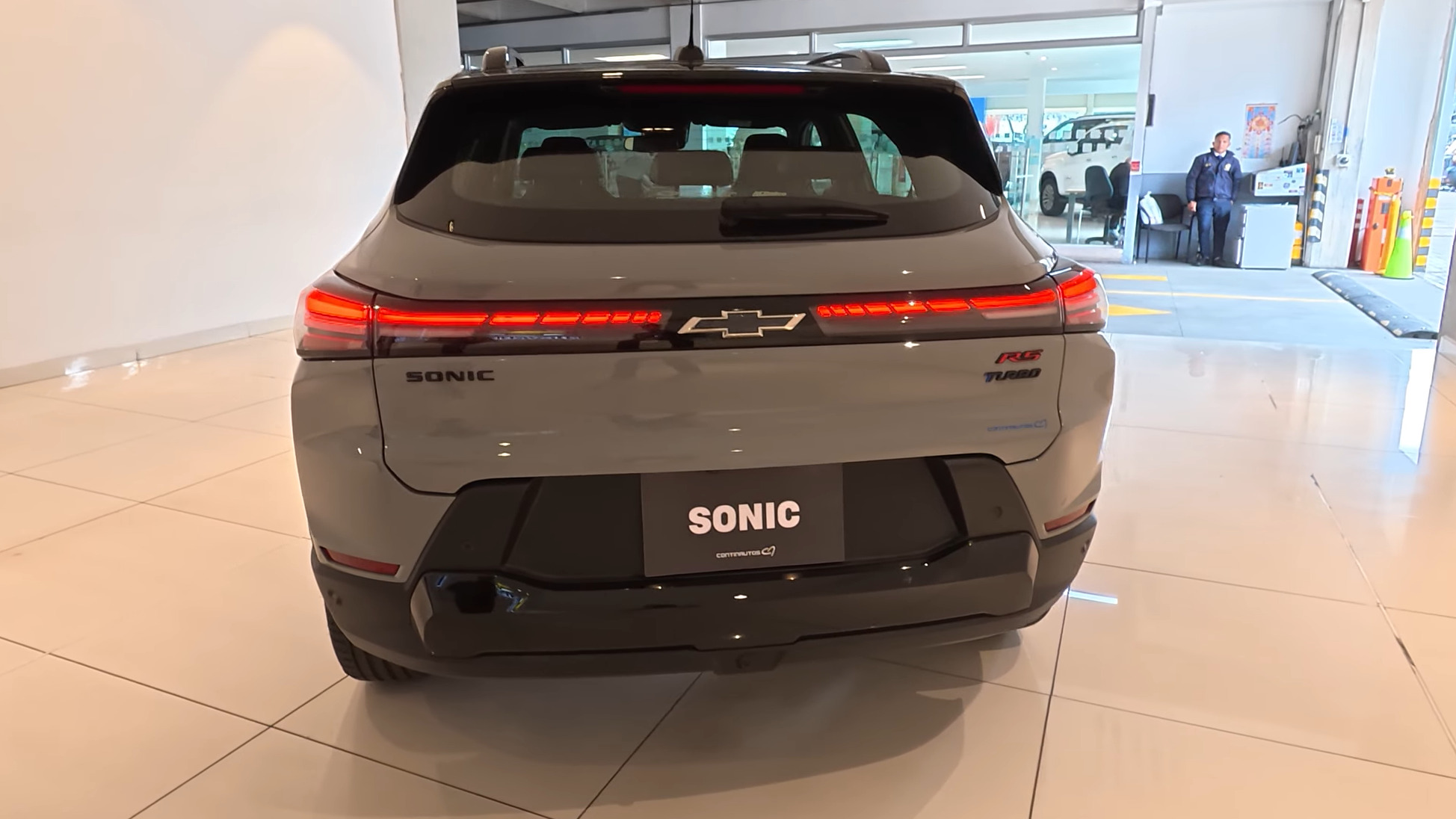
Chevrolet Sonic rear

Although it shares the doors, windows and C‑pillar of the Onix hatch, the Sonic features its own design at the front and rear. The bonnet is more horizontal and elevated, the front grille is wider, and there is a lighting cluster divided into three levels: LED daytime running lights at the top, main headlights in the centre and fog lights at the base. At the rear, the boot lid has been redesigned and the rear overhang extended, drawing inspiration from the Equinox EV to increase luggage capacity. The tail lights, with LED technology, are expected to be connected by a horizontal bar, and the wheel arches gain plastic mouldings and greater ride height.

The side profile follows a coupe‑like crossover silhouette, with a sloping roof and lengthened rear pillars. Spy shots show that the car will have roof rails and black paint on the roof area, but it is unlikely to offer a sunroof, an uncommon feature in this segment.

=== Interior ===
The interior is entirely different compared with the Onix, with a redesigned dashboard inspired by the new Tracker and other recent GM releases. It was expected to feature two integrated displays: a digital instrument panel of around 8 inches and a multimedia screen of around 10 inches, in addition to more refined trim with new fabric or synthetic leather patterns. Unlike the Onix, the Sonic has a digital instrument cluster, exclusive dashboard and updated infotainment system, as well as a package of driver‑assistance technologies (ADAS) similar to that of the Tracker.

== Platform and dimensions ==
The Sonic uses the GEM (Global Emerging Markets) platform, the same used in the Onix, Onix Plus and Tracker. The front suspension was expected to adopt a MacPherson strut layout and the rear uses a torsion beam, combining ventilated discs at the front and drum brakes at the rear—an arrangement already employed by the Onix and Tracker.

Compared to the Onix Hatch, the Sonic has the same wheelbase, but is about 60 mm (2.4 in) taller, 70 mm (2.8 in) longer, and 40 mm (1.6 in) wider.

== Powertrain ==
The Sonic is powered by the 1.0‑litre turboflex three‑cylinder engine, also used in the Onix and Tracker. It produces up to 115 CV (85 kW; 113 hp) and 18.9 kg⋅m (185 N⋅m; 137 lb⋅ft) of torque, paired with a six‑speed manual or automatic transmission.

Press reports suggest that entry‑level versions may receive the 1.0‑litre naturally aspirated flex engine (around 82 hp) and that a top version could adopt the 1.2‑litre turbo with direct injection from the Tracker. There is also speculation that the 1.0 turboflex could receive direct injection and a mild‑hybrid system, or even a flex‑hybrid version, to comply with emissions regulations.

== Equipment ==
Launch versions include LED headlights and fog lights, alloy wheels, and six airbags as standard. Other features include wireless phone charging, connectivity with internet via OnStar/Wi‑Fi and a set of driver‑assistance systems comprising forward collision warning, autonomous emergency braking, blind‑spot monitoring and, on higher trims, semi‑automatic parking (Park Assist).

== Production and market ==
The Sonic is built exclusively at the Gravataí factory in Rio Grande do Sul. GM had confirmed that the model uses the same assembly line and infrastructure as the Onix, and that the plant became the export hub for the Sonic to other South American countries. According to the press, the initial price is around R$130,000, positioning it below the Tracker and in direct competition with the Fiat Pulse, Renault Kardian, Citroën Basalt and Volkswagen T‑Cross (Tera). The model is marketed only in South America, and there are no plans for export to other continents.

== See also ==
- Chevrolet Onix
- Chevrolet Tracker
