= Buick Encore =

Mini SUV

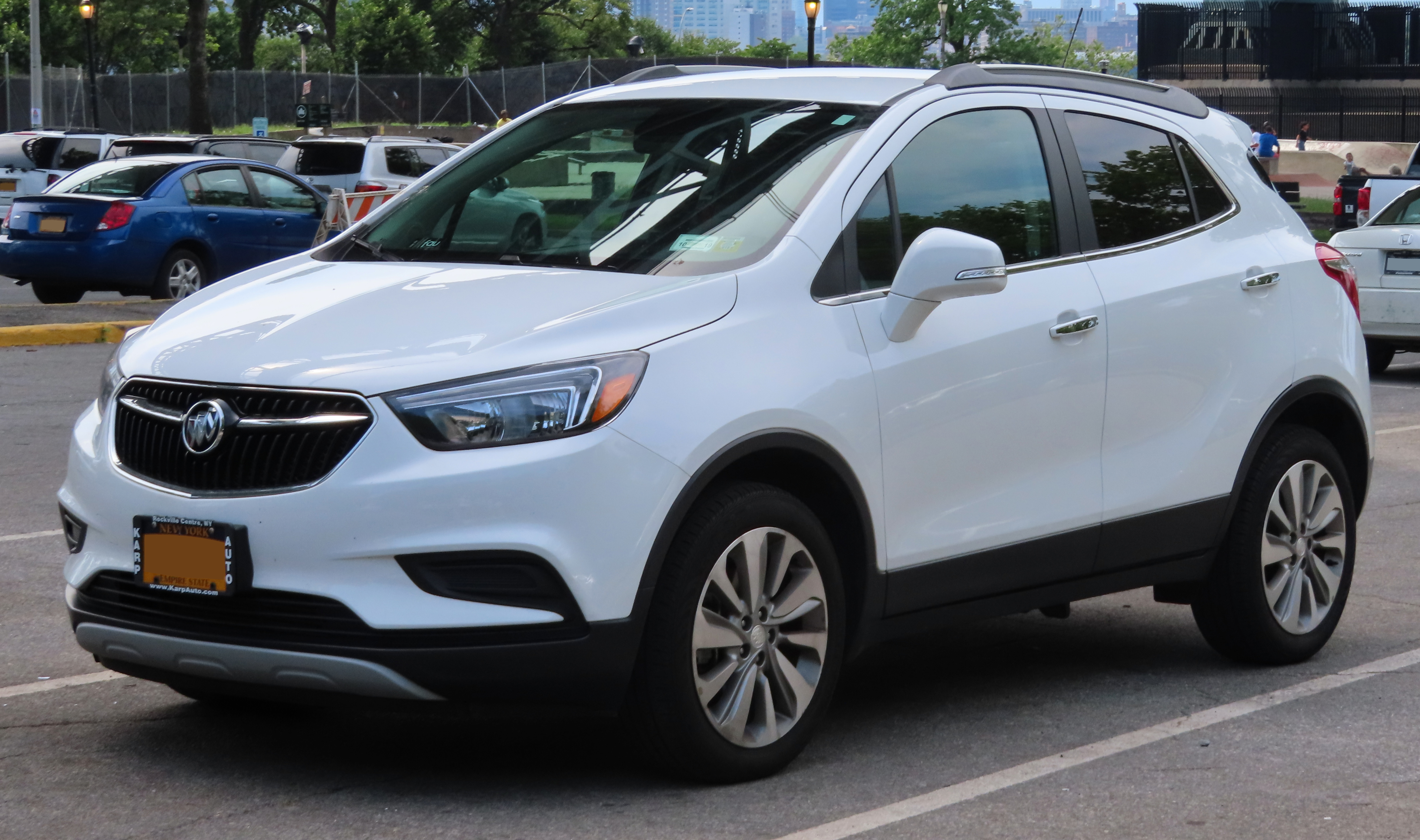

Overview
- Manufacturer: General Motors
- Production: 2012–2022
- Model years: 2013–2022

Body and chassis
- Class: Subcompact crossover SUV
- Body style: 5-door SUV

Chronology
- Successor: Buick Envista (North America)

The Buick Encore is a subcompact crossover SUV built by General Motors from 2012 to 2022. It is a subcompact crossover SUV marketed by Buick and its fourth SUV overall after the Rendezvous, Rainier, and Enclave.

The "Encore" designation was previously used by American Motors Corporation (AMC) for the subcompact two and four-door hatchback variants of the U.S.-built front-wheel drive Renault Alliance from 1984 to 1987.

== First generation (2013) ==
First generation
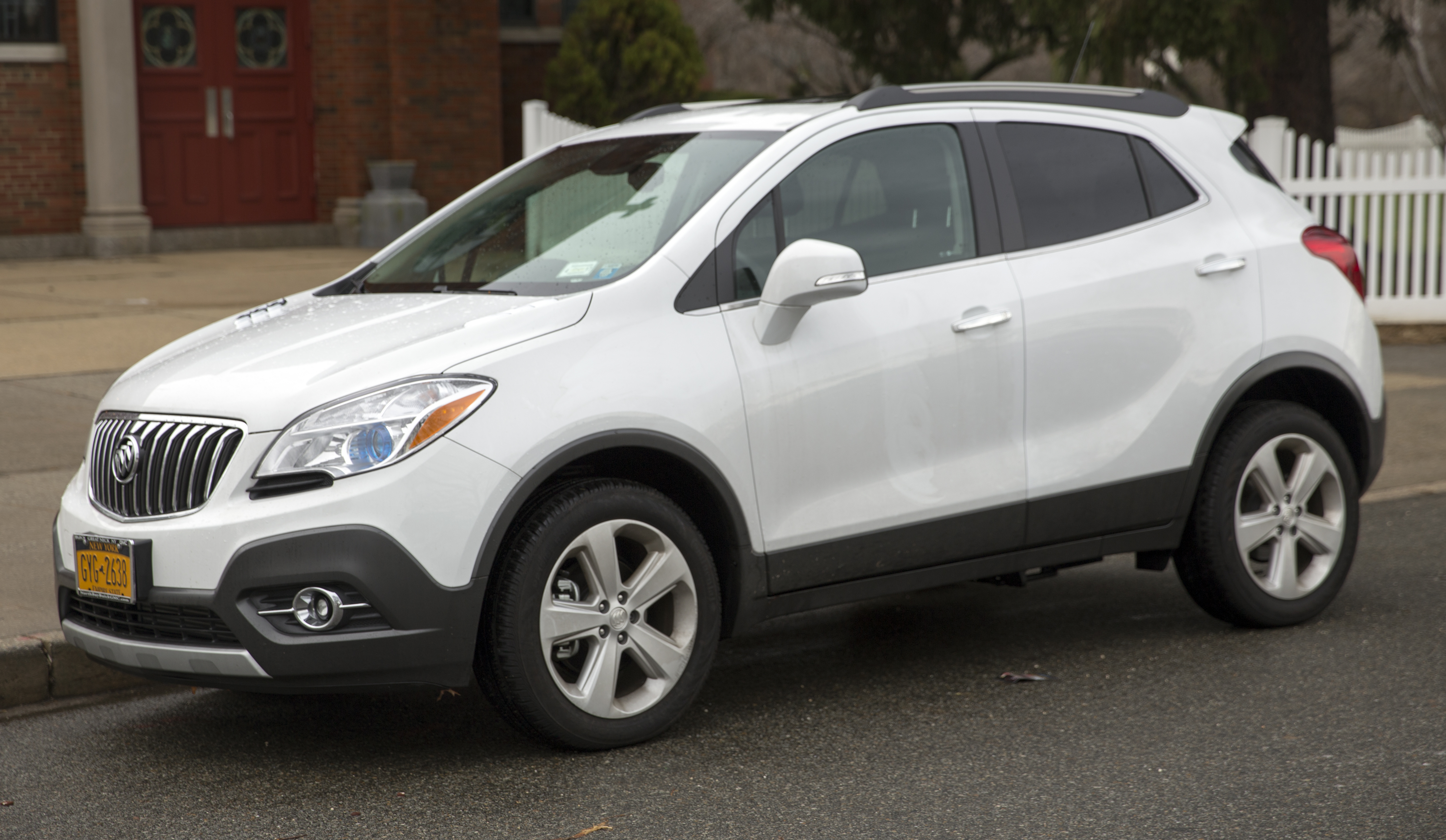

Overview
- Also called: Opel/Vauxhall Mokka
- Production: 2012–2022 (South Korea); 2012–2019 (China)
- Model years: 2013–2022 (North America)
- Assembly: South Korea: Bupyeong-gu, Incheon (GM Korea); China: Yantai, Shandong (SAIC-GM)
- Designer: Carsten Aengenheyster; Marc van der Haegen (facelift)

Body and chassis
- Layout: Front-engine, front-wheel drive or all-wheel-drive
- Platform: GM Gamma II
- Related: Chevrolet Trax (U200); Chevrolet Aveo/Sonic (T300)

Powertrain
- Engine: Gasoline: 1.4 L A14NET I4 turbo; 1.4 L B14XFT I4 turbo; 1.6 L A16XER I4; 1.8 L A18XER I4; Diesel: 1.6 L B16DTN I4 turbo; 1.6 L B16DTH I4 turbo; 1.7 L A17DTS I4 turbo
- Transmission: 5-speed manual; 6-speed manual; 6-speed GM 6T40 automatic

Dimensions
- Wheelbase: 2,555 mm (100.6 in)
- Length: 4,280 mm (168.5 in)
- Width: 1,775 mm (69.9 in)
- Height: 1,646 mm (64.8 in)
- Kerb weight: 1,293 kg (2,851 lb) (2WD); 1,386 kg (3,056 lb) (4WD)

The first-generation Encore is a restyled first-generation Chevrolet Trax, and shares the same styling with the European Opel/Vauxhall Mokka. It debuted at the 2012 North American International Auto Show in Detroit on January 10, 2012, and went on sale at the end of 2012. The North American Encore is assembled at the GM Korea plant in Bupyeong, South Korea alongside the Trax. The Chinese market Encore is assembled in Shandong.

The 2013, 2014 and 2015 Encore in the U.S. was offered in Base, Convenience, Leather, and Premium level models with the A14NET 1.4-liter inline-four multi-port fuel injected (MFI) VVT turbo gasoline engine rated at 128 hp (95 kW; 130 PS) @ 4900 rpm coupled to a 6-speed automatic transmission. It was available in front-wheel drive (FWD) and all-wheel drive (AWD) versions.

For 2016, a new Sport Touring second tier model was added which included an 18-inch alloy wheels with midnight silver finish, rear spoiler, body-color door handles, remote start, fog lights, and a new more powerful B14XFT Ecotec inline four-cylinder direct fuel injection VVT engine rated at 153 hp (114 kW; 155 PS) @ 5600 rpm in Encore marketing materials. However, Opel in Europe rates the engine for the Mokka at 150 hp (112 kW; 152 PS) @ 4900–6000 rpm.

The Ecotec direct-injection engine package includes Stop/Start technology to improve fuel economy and was made available as an option on all but the base model for 2017 and 2018. In 2017, the model levels became Base, Preferred, Sport Touring, Preferred II, Essence, and Premium.

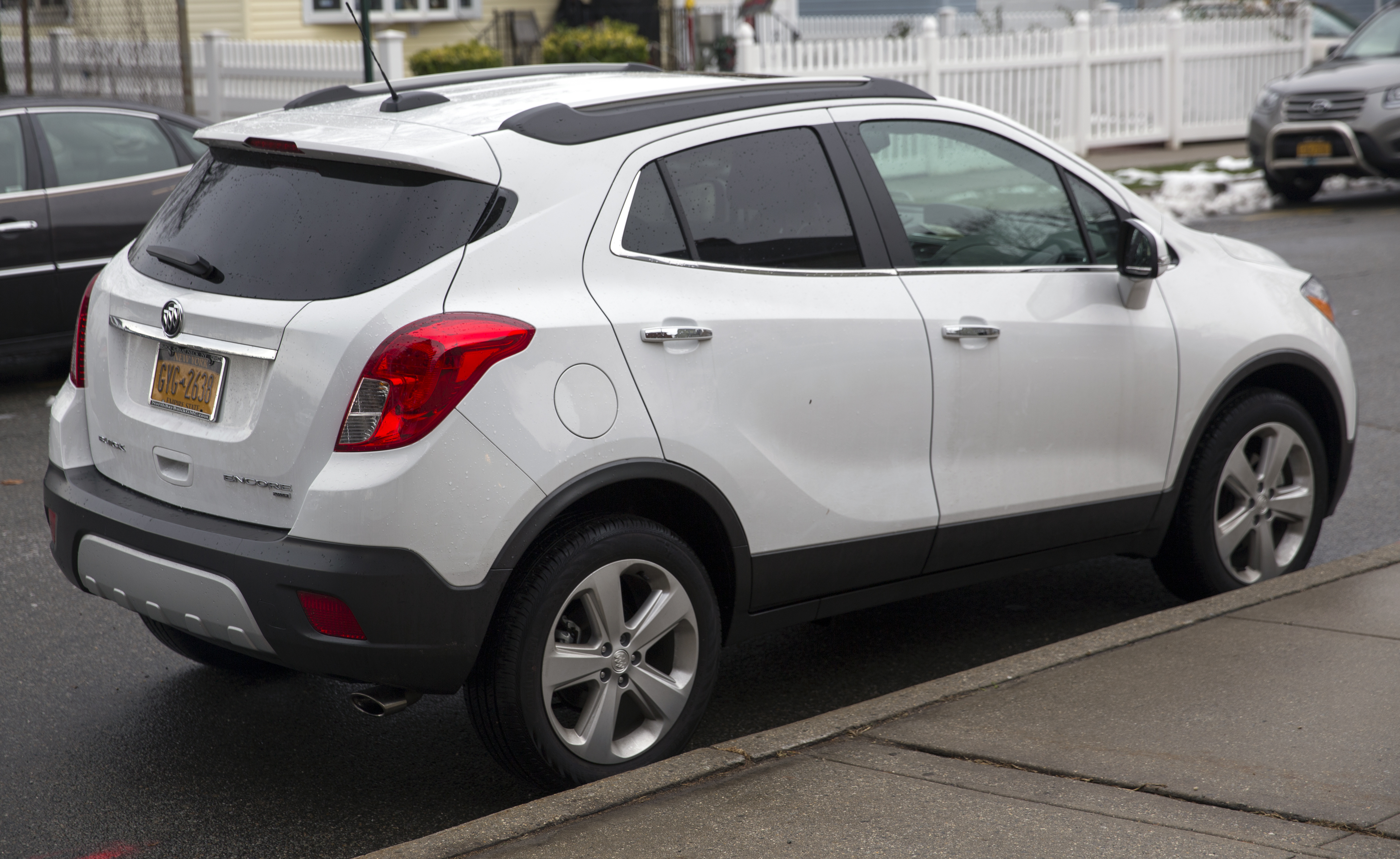
Rear view

=== 2017 refresh ===
For 2017, the Buick Encore received revised headlights and bumpers, LED tail lights, and the interior received a revised dash and gauge cluster with a 4.2-inch information screen, a revised center stack, and infotainment system with an 8-inch frameless screen. The faux fender ports, marketed as VentiPorts on models from 2013 to 2016, were removed.

Following the introduction of the all-new Encore GX for the 2020 model year, the Encore remained in the Buick lineup as the brand's "entry-level" vehicle. All trims except for the mid-level Preferred trim were discontinued, and the Preferred became the new "base model" of the Encore, with limited exterior color options, only one interior color option, and condensed options.

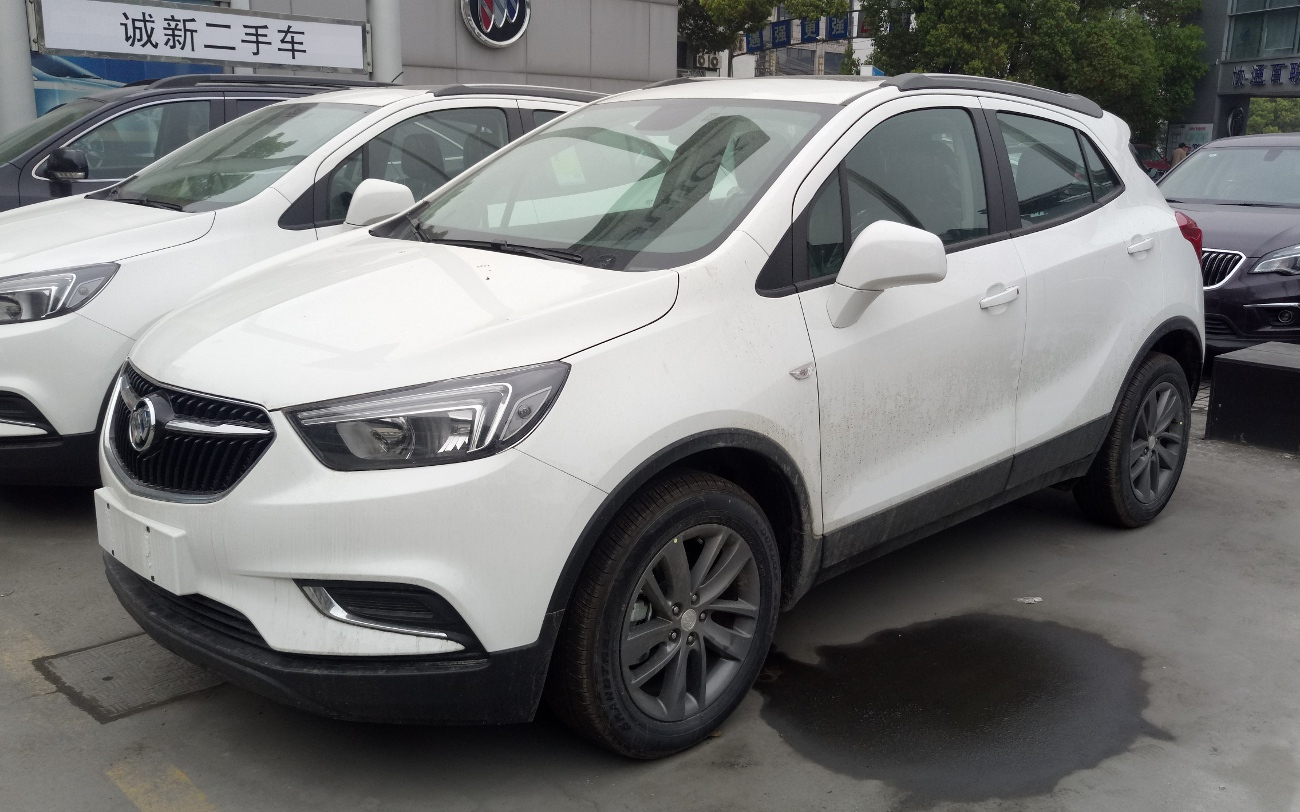
Facelift

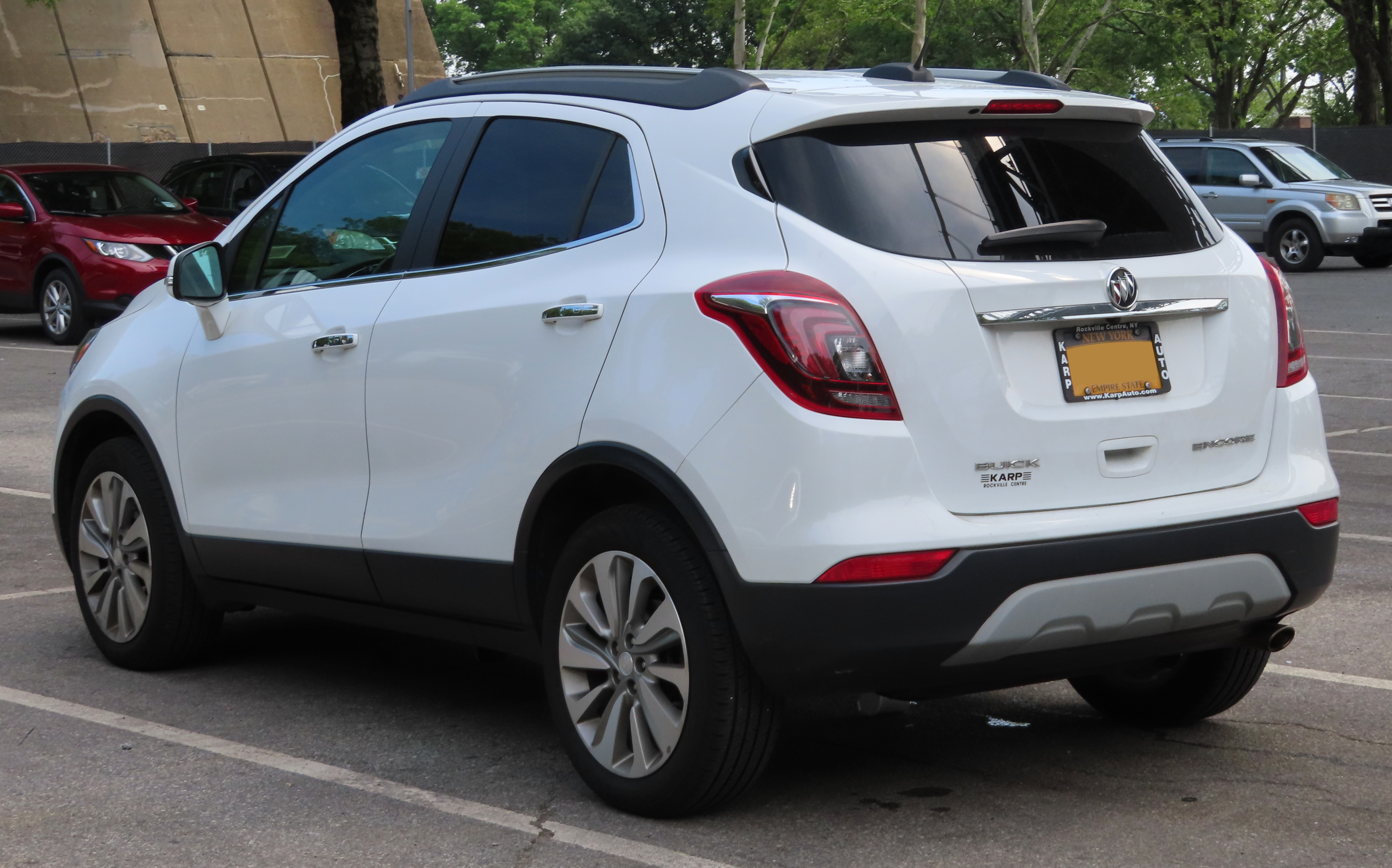
Rear view (facelift)

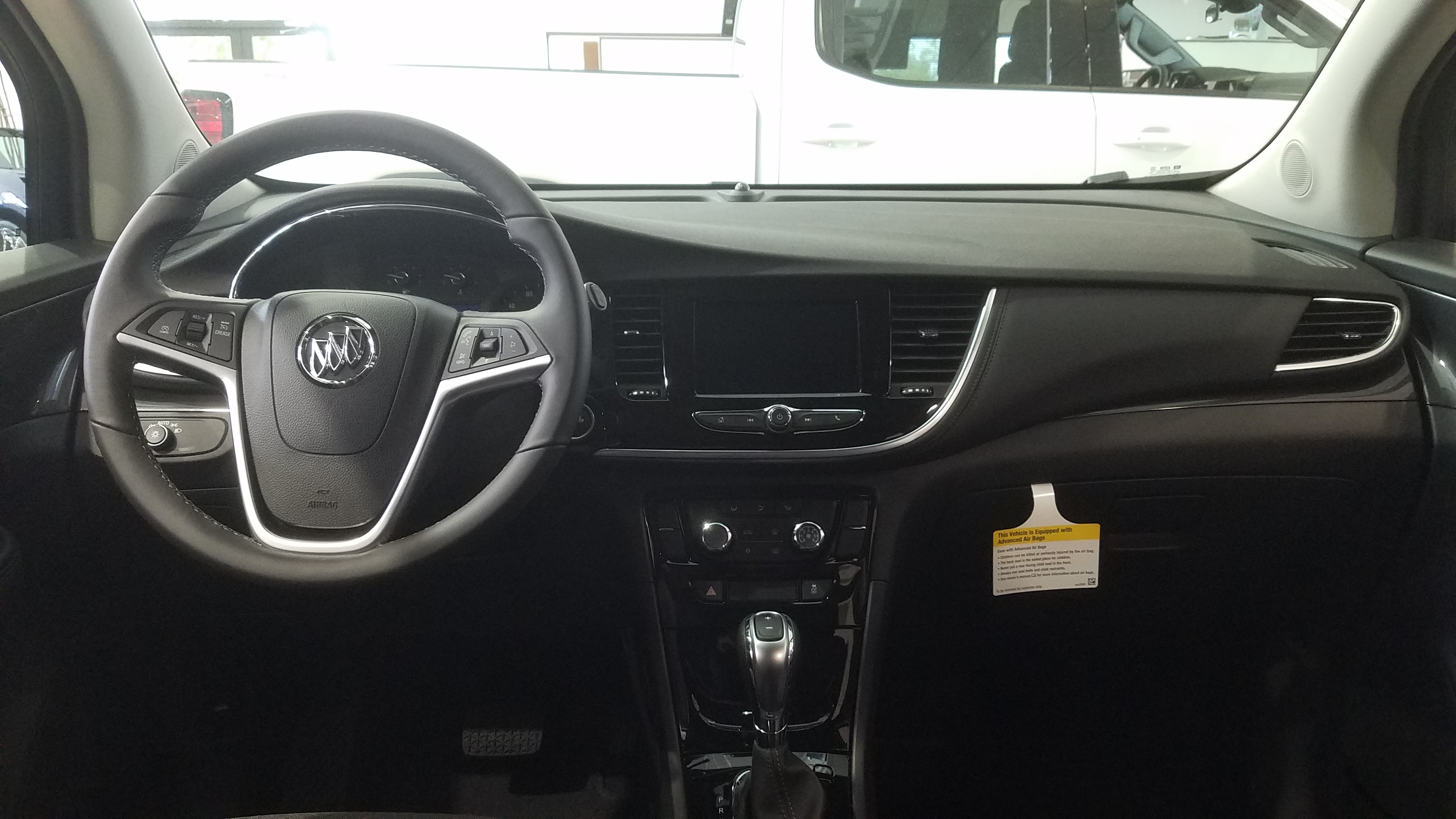
Interior (facelift)

=== Discontinuation ===
General Motors discontinued the Buick Encore following the 2022 model year. There has been no direct replacement, and the larger Buick Encore GX became the new entry-level vehicle in the Buick lineup.

=== Safety ===
IIHS crash worthiness and avoidance ratings for 2016 Buick Encore
Small overlap frontal offset impact – driver side	Good
Small overlap frontal offset impact – passenger side	Acceptable
Moderate overlap frontal offset impact	Good
Side impact	Good
Roof strength	Good
Head restraints & seats (power leather seats)	Good
Headlights	Poor

== Second generation (2019) ==
Second generation
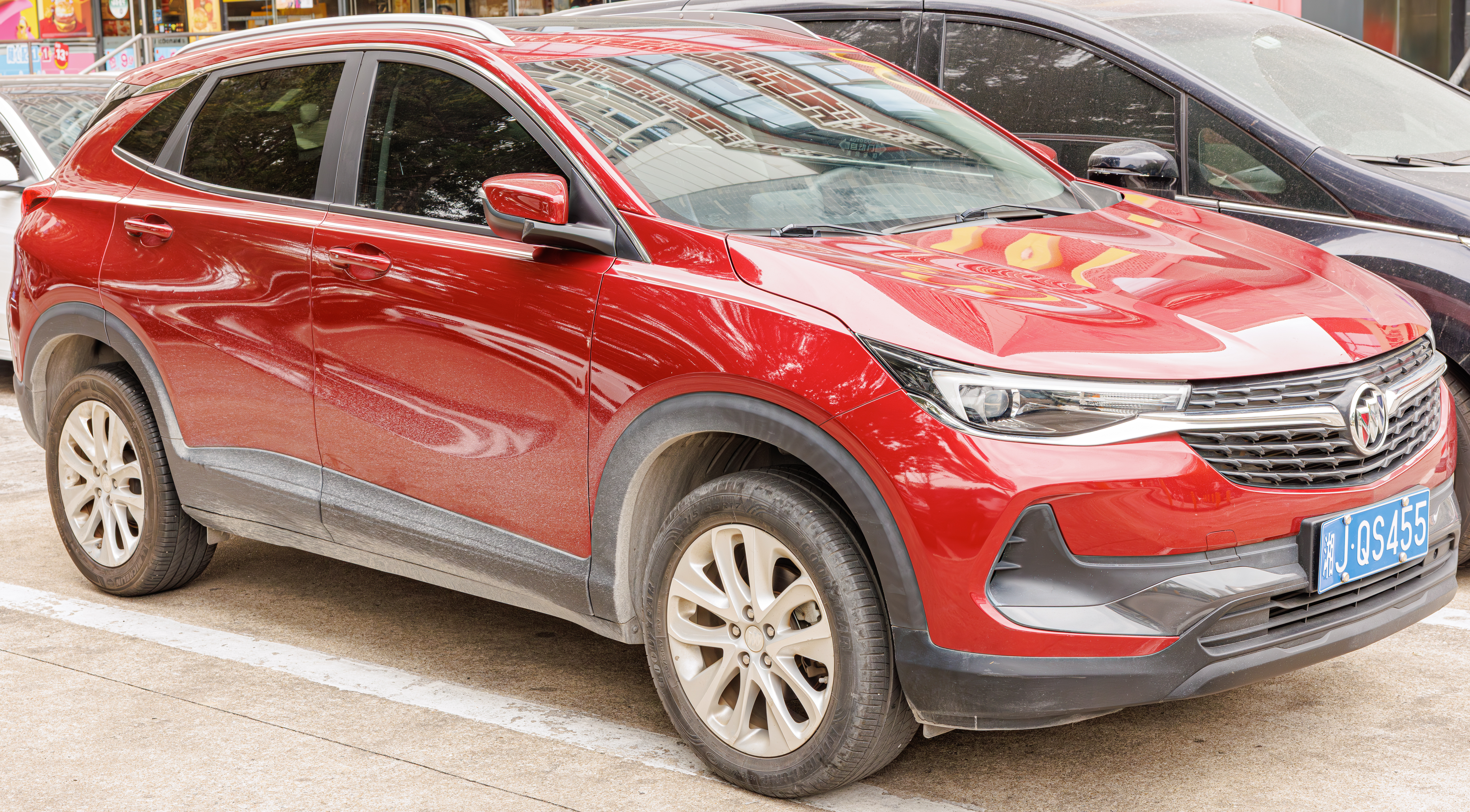

Overview
- Production: 2019–2022
- Model years: 2020–2022
- Assembly: China: Shenyang, Liaoning

Body and chassis
- Class: Subcompact crossover SUV
- Body style: 5-door SUV
- Layout: Front-engine, front-wheel drive or all-wheel-drive
- Platform: GM GEM platform
- Related: Chevrolet Tracker (2019)

Powertrain
- Engine: 1.0 L B10XFT Ecotec I3 (turbo petrol); 1.3 L L3T I3 (turbo petrol)
- Transmission: 6-speed GM 6T40 automatic (1.0T); CVT (1.3T FWD)

Dimensions
- Wheelbase: 2,570 mm (101.2 in)
- Length: 4,295 mm (169.1 in)
- Width: 1,798 mm (70.8 in)
- Height: 1,616 mm (63.6 in)

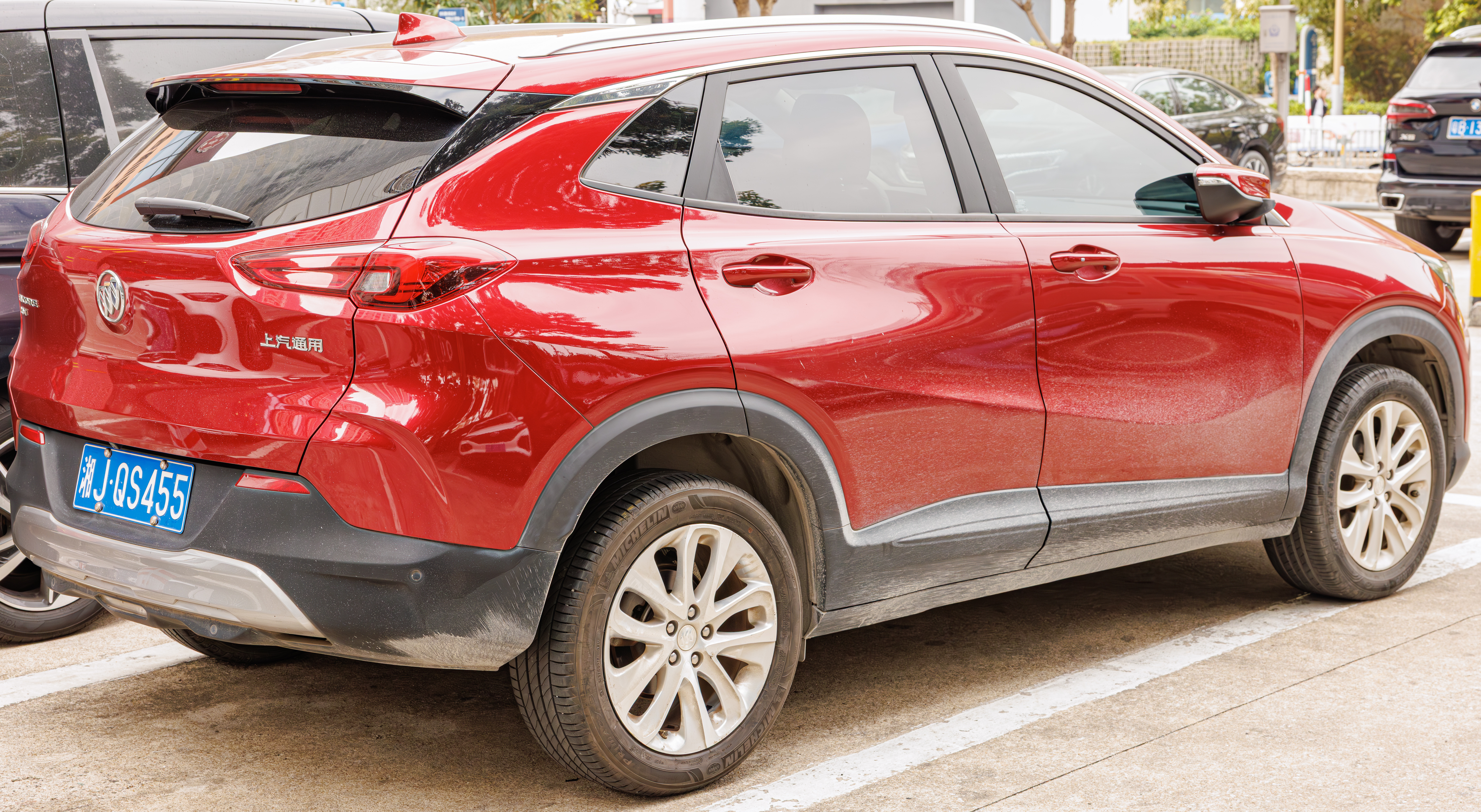
Rear view

The second-generation Encore was revealed alongside the Encore GX during the 2019 Shanghai Auto Show. It will be available with either a 1.0 L inline-3 turbo petrol engine rated at 92 kW (123 hp) or a 1.3 L inline-3 turbo petrol producing 121 kW (162 hp).

The second-generation Encore is not exported to North America, since it uses the GEM platform intended for emerging markets. The first-generation Encore continued to be sold in North America, along with the new Buick Encore GX that debuted in 2020 until 2022, when it was discontinued and replaced by the Envista. As of July 2023, the Encore is no longer listed on Buick China's website.

== Sales ==
Calendar year	United States	China	Canada	Mexico
2012	—	10,015		
2013	31,956	61,563		
2014	48,892	82,346	5,683	
2015	67,549	82,013	4,915	
2016	78,565	71,945	5,533	
2017	88,035	41,129	8,964	523
2018	93,073	15,177	10,794	1,475
2019	102,402	21,381	10,196	1,587
2020	41,752	20,538	6,480	1,091
2021	20,072	3,239	1,902	1,070
2022	13,718	2,859	583	724
2023	5,887	936	40	996
2024	126	38	—	646

Note: Mexico production figures for 2020-onward are regarding the GM VSS-F platform Encore GX, sold there as the Encore.
