= General Motors do Brasil =

Brazilian car manufacturer

General Motors do Brasil Ltda.
- Type: Wholly owned subsidiary
- Industry: Automotive
- Founded: 1925; 101 years ago
- Headquarters: São Caetano do Sul, Brazil
- Products: Automobiles, pickups
- Brands: Chevrolet
- Revenue: ▼US$7.31 billion (2012)
- Number of employees: 22,894 (2010)
- Parent: General Motors
- Website: gm.com.br

General Motors do Brasil is the largest subsidiary of General Motors in South America, one of the oldest and largest car producers in Brazil.

Founded in 1925 and initially located in the historic district of Ipiranga, São Paulo, the company assembled cars using imported parts from the United States.

In 2015, it completed 90 years of activities in the country and, in 2021, it celebrated the milestone of 17 million units produced in the country.

== History ==
Inauguration of the General Motors Plant in São José dos Campos (SP) by President Juscelino Kubitschek, 1959

Initially operating in a rented warehouse, GM do Brasil opened its first plant in 1930 in São Caetano do Sul, São Paulo.

In 1958, a second factory was opened in São José dos Campos, officially inaugurated a year later by Juscelino Kubitschek, the President of Brazil at the time, for die casting and other cars assemblies.

GM introduced its first car in the country, the Chevrolet Opala, in 1968.

In 1973, GM launched the Chevrolet Chevette, which has accumulated sales exceeding 1.2 million units. It was replaced by the Corsa in 1994, the first economy car with electronic fuel injection in Brazil, after tests were conducted near Indaiatuba.

From 1968 until 2005, GM used Opel-developed cars badged as "Chevrolet".

In July 2000, it launched the Industrial Complex of Gravataí in Rio Grande do Sul, one of the world's most modern factories.

After the globalization and sale of Opel to PSA Group (now Stellantis), vehicles like the Chevrolet Onix were made from project designed and imported from SAIC-GM in Shanghai, China. Most designs came ready from Warren, mainly pickup trucks. Other Brazilian own projects cars were the Chevrolet Agile, still based on Corsa Platform, Chevrolet Meriva, Chevrolet Kadett, Chevrolet Monza and Chevrolet Zafira, those from Opel projects, among others Brazilian own studies.

In 2005, GM do Brasil sold a total of 365,259 vehicles, 21.3% of the Brazilian market. The percentage was 22.6% in the SUV and commercial segment. The company's total production reached 559,345 units when counting exports.

In 2005, exports reached a value of US$ 1.6 billion, for the shipment of 114,994 complete knock-down (CKD) units and 125,678 vehicles exported to some 40 countries around the world. The main market for exports was Mexico, followed by Argentina, Venezuela, South Africa and other Latin American countries.

In the social area, GM do Brasil focused activities through the General Motors Institute, created in 1993, its mission is to rescue the citizenship of children, youths and adults from poor communities, which are located especially close to industrial plants of the company. Its shares are primarily in education.

In 2019, GM do Brasil sold 475,684 vehicles, an increase of 10% over the previous calendar year, surpassing China in sales. The last time sales exceed the Asian country was 2013, when GM sold 643,100 units in Brazil.

In 2021, a huge investment of R$10 billion (US$1.79 billion) was made to improve manufacturing in São Paulo. The investment was first announced in 2019. Despite this, sales dropped 28.5% to 242,108 vehicles.

In December 2021, GM South America announced to hire around 250 engineers from various specialties to work mainly in the areas of the São Caetano do Sul Technological Centre, such as bodywork and structure, exterior, interior, chassis, engine, transmission, electronics, controllers, software, and virtual simulation. In 2023, 1100 Employees were dismissed. From 2024 to 2028, an investment plan of R$7 billion or US$1.4 billion is ongoing, US$350 million per year, with subside of Brazilian President, in order to review and update the models tooling products.

GMB celebrated 100 years and launched the program Chevrolet Vintage, where they plan to reconstruct the GMB Chevrolet Opala, C10 Chevette and Monza. The first will be a C10 restored with V8 Camaro Engine, because the Camaro was discontinued to be imported to Brasil. A factory in S. Caetano will build the cars.

At the Pólo Automotivo PACE Comexport, GMB began to assemble the Chevrolet Spark EUV in December 2026 as a complete knock-down, with plans to add the Chevrolet Captiva EV in 2026. The project has a total investment of R$ 400 million (US$ 73,7 million).

Santiago Chamorro, left GMB as (CEO) after, since 2021, being 4.5 years President, for retirement 32 years career.
Fabio Rua (Vice President)

== Products ==
All of them under the Chevrolet brand:

=== Locally produced ===
- Onix, China project
- Montana, Brazilian project
- Spin, Brazilian project
- S10, USA & Brazilian projet
- Chevrolet Sonic, Brazilian project
- Tracker, USA project
- TrailBlazer (since 2012), USA project
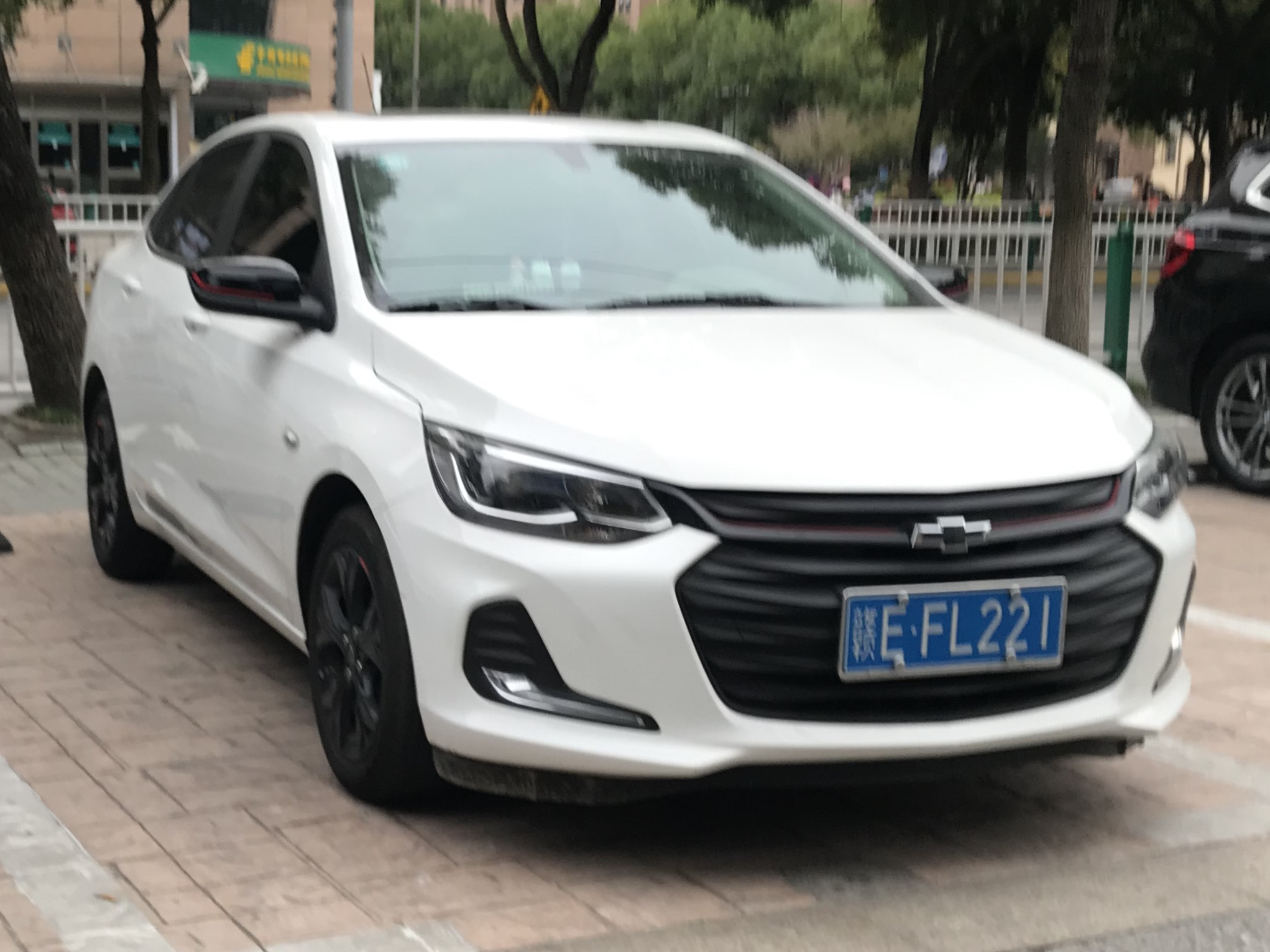
Chevrolet Onix

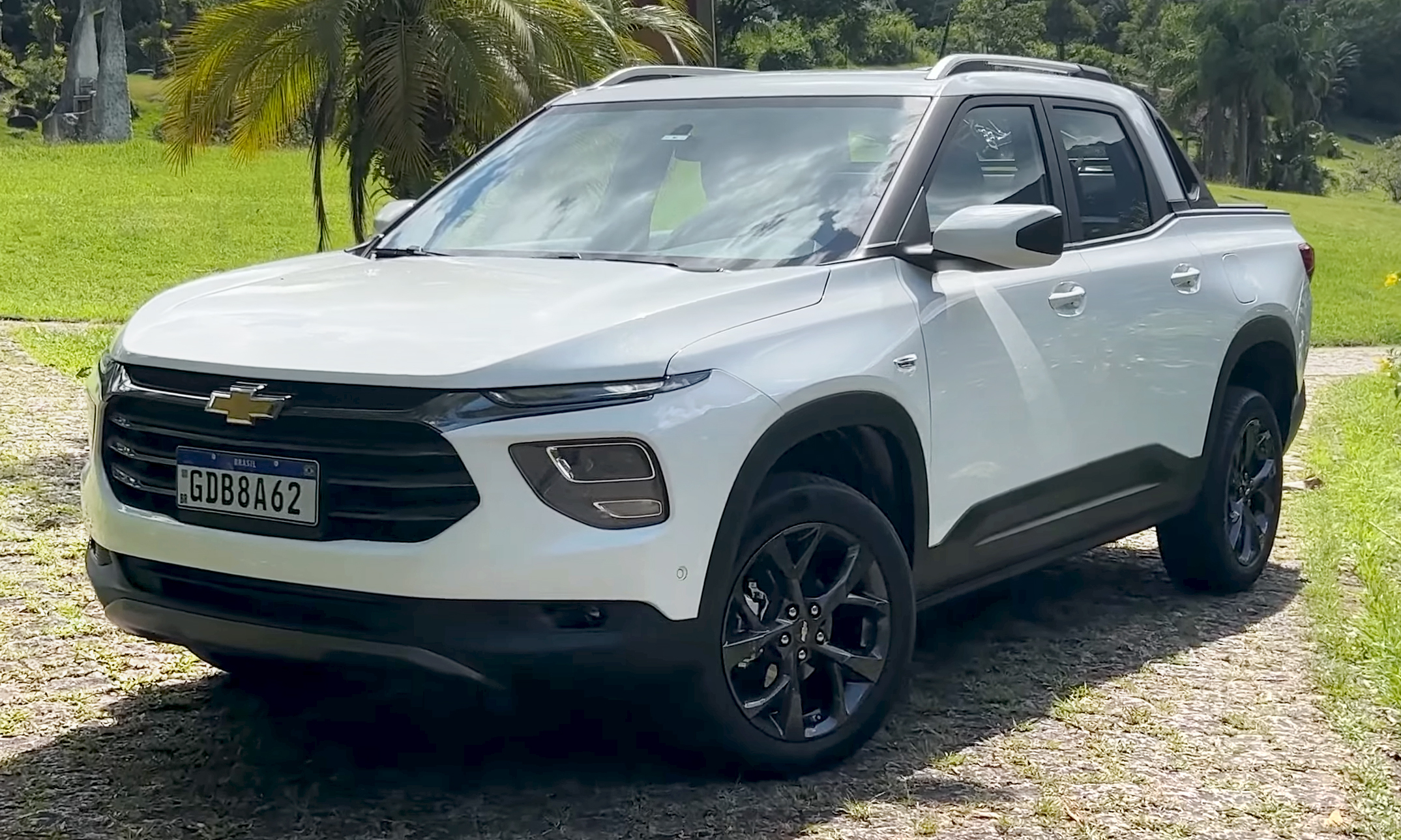
Chevrolet Montana

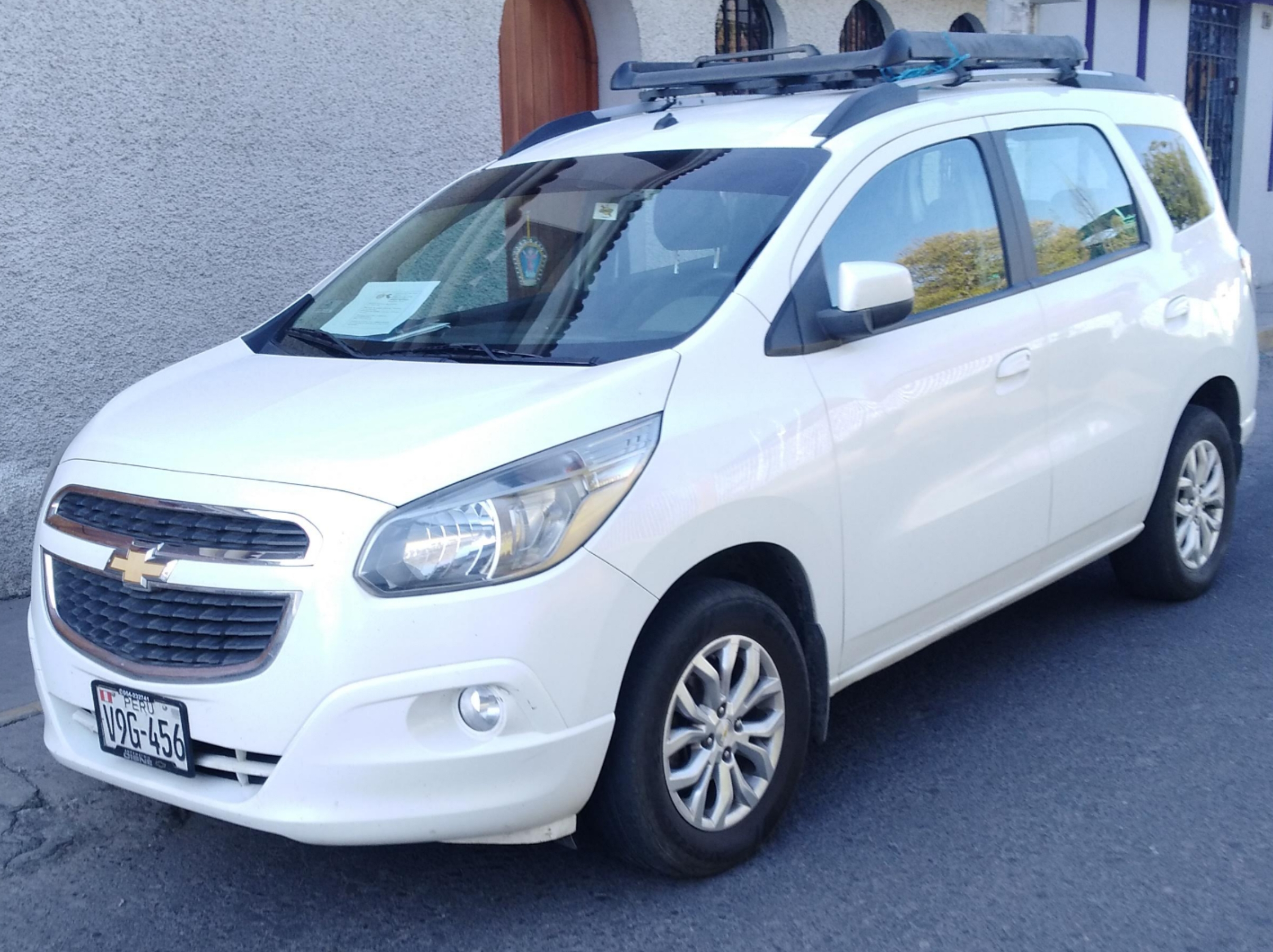
Chevrolet Spin

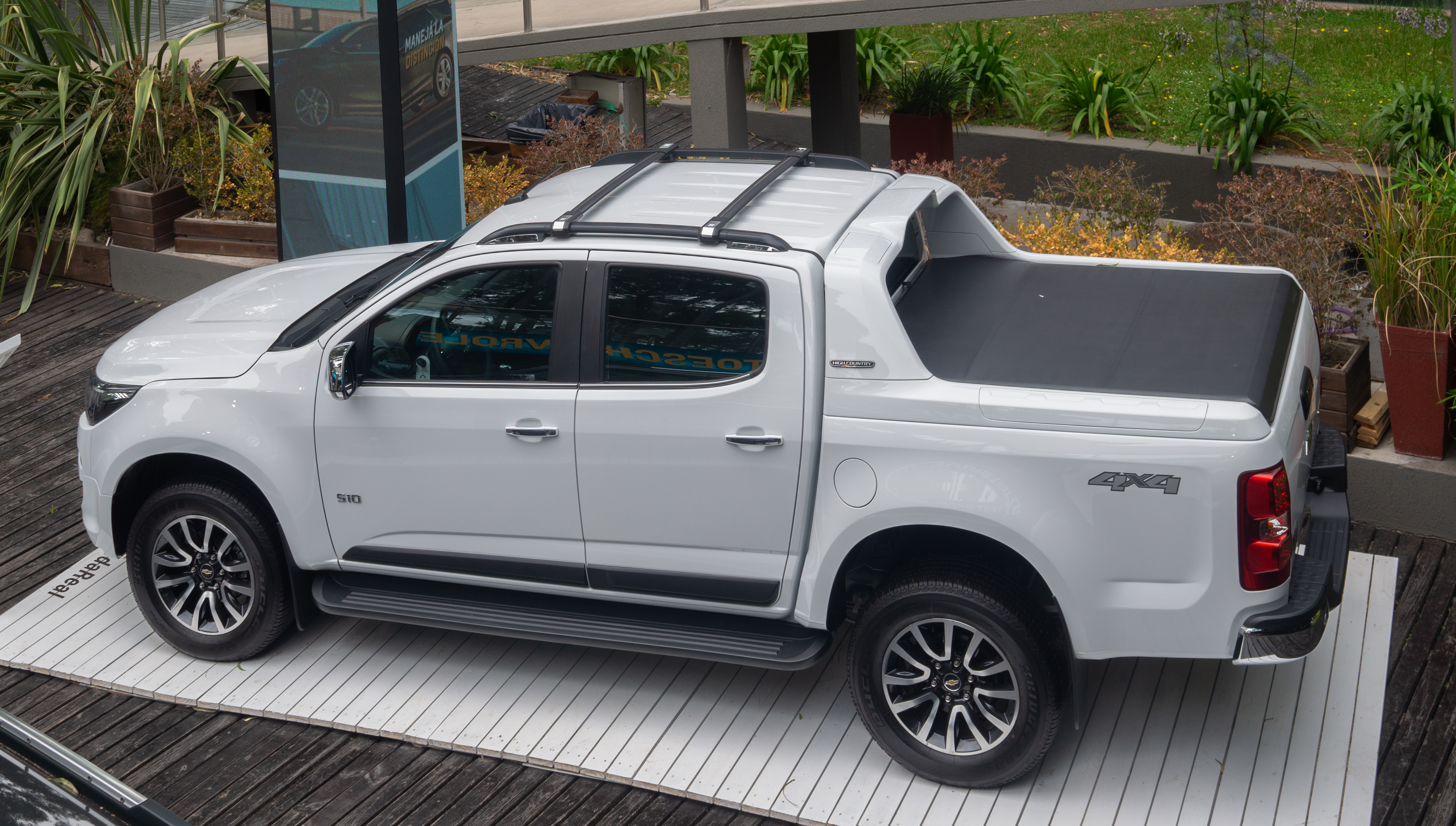
Chevrolet S10

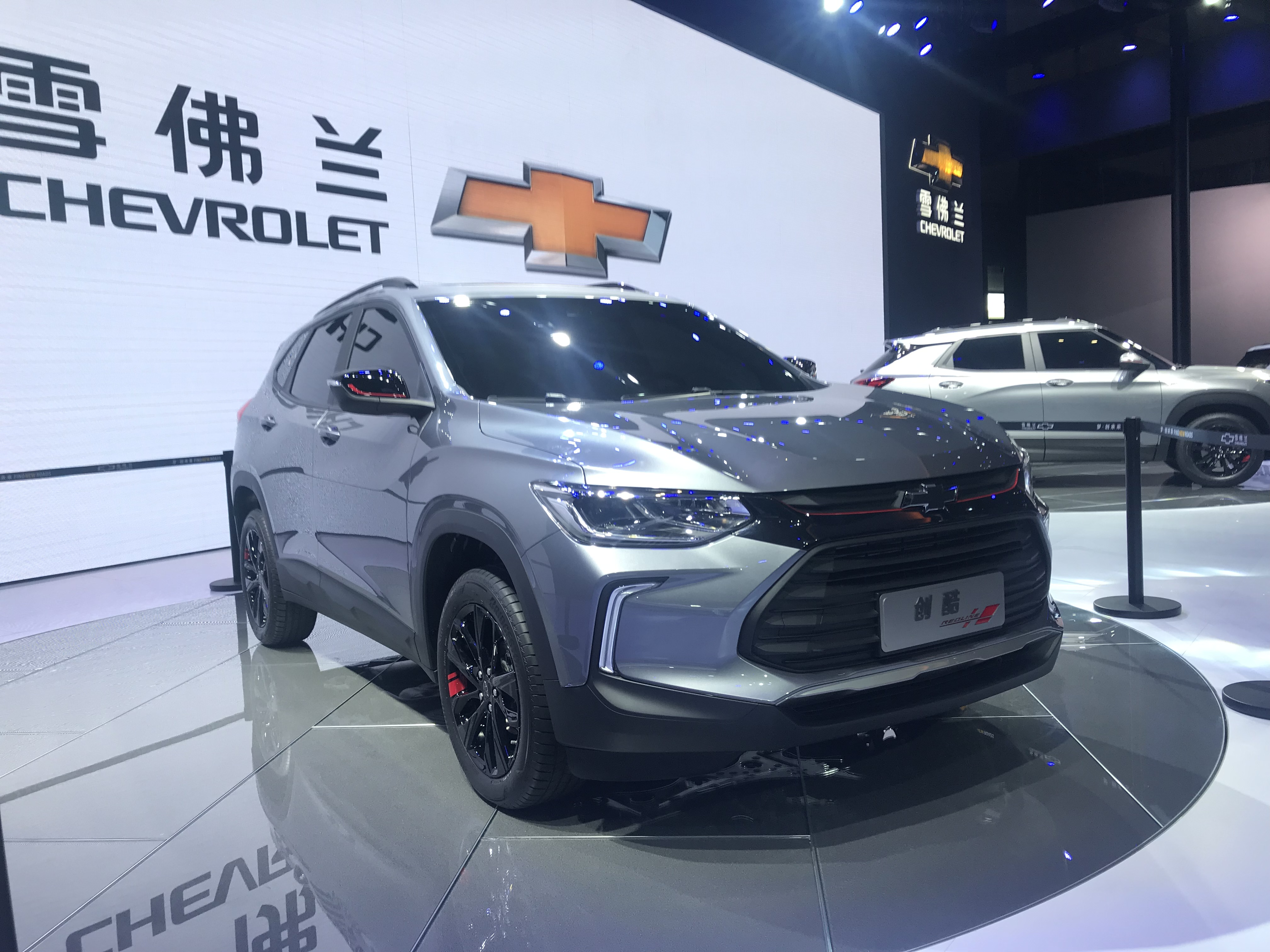
Chevrolet Tracker

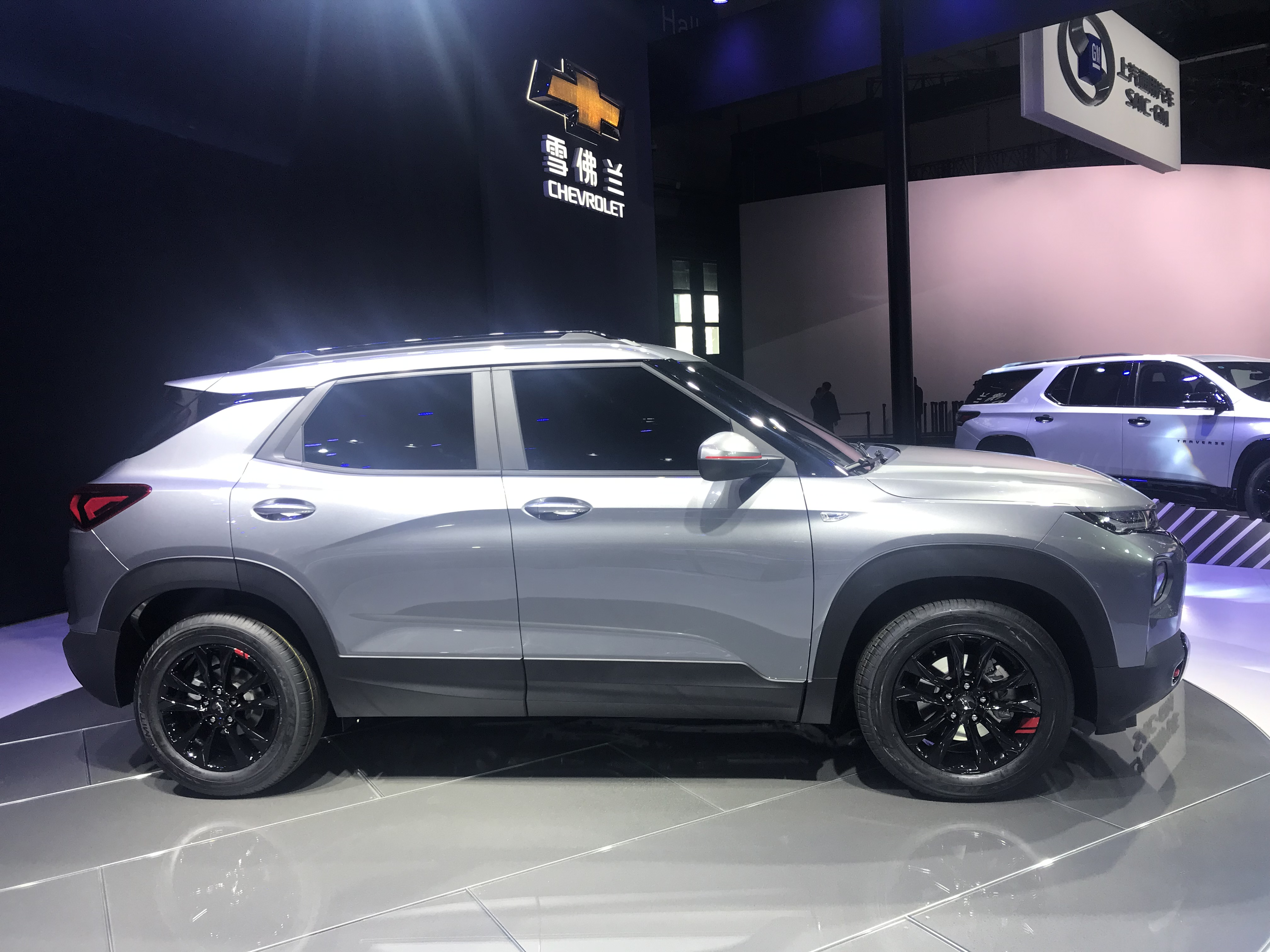
Chevrolet TrailBlazer

=== Imported ===
- Chevrolet Spark EUV – From China and assembled at Planta Automotiva do Ceará PACE Horizonte since 3 Dezember 2025
- Chevrolet Blazer EV
- Bolt EUV & EV – From the USA
- Chevrolet Captiva EV – From China
- Equinox EV – From Mexico
- Silverado
- Cadillac Optiq – Imported from Mexico.
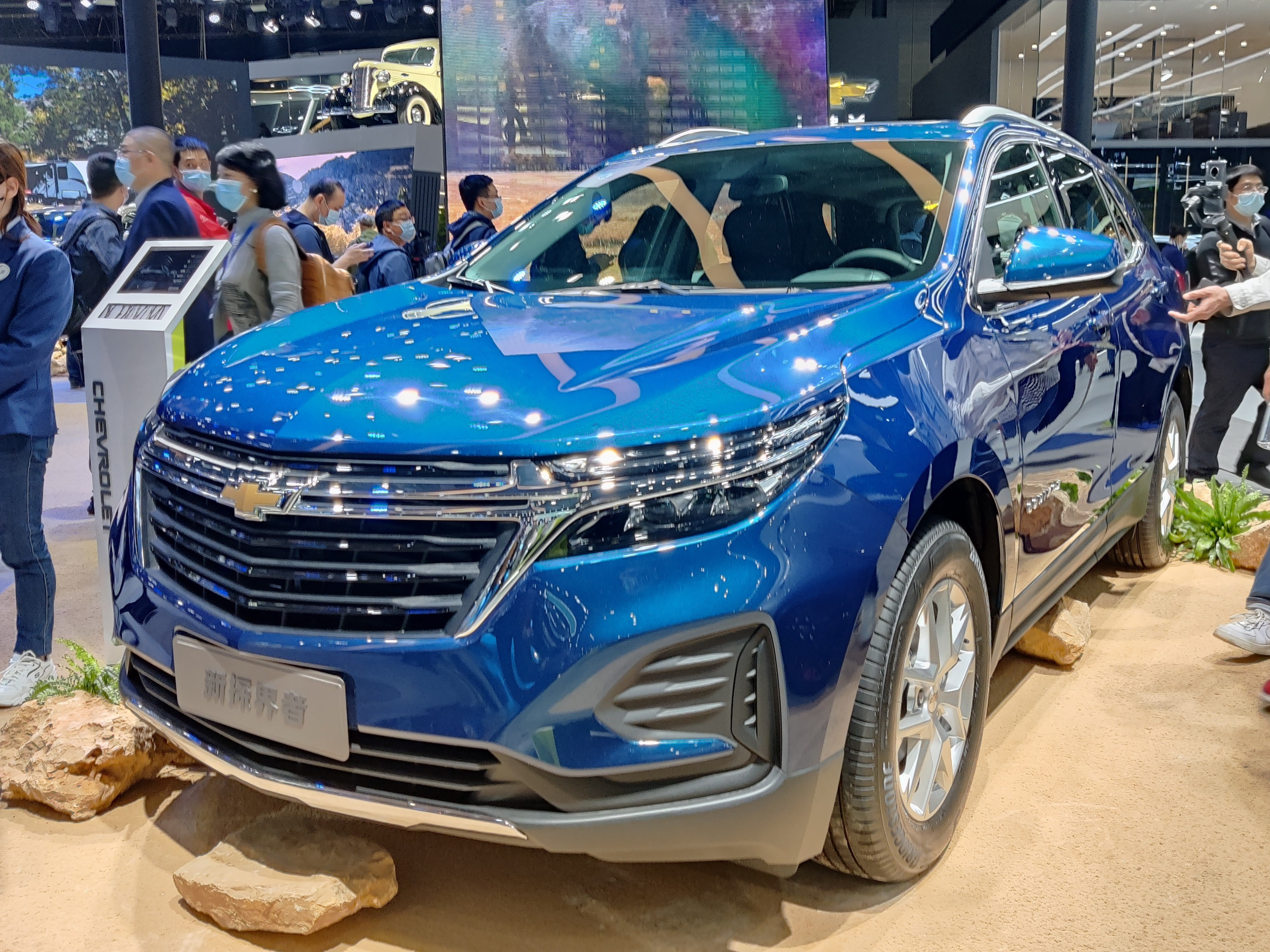
Chevrolet Equinox

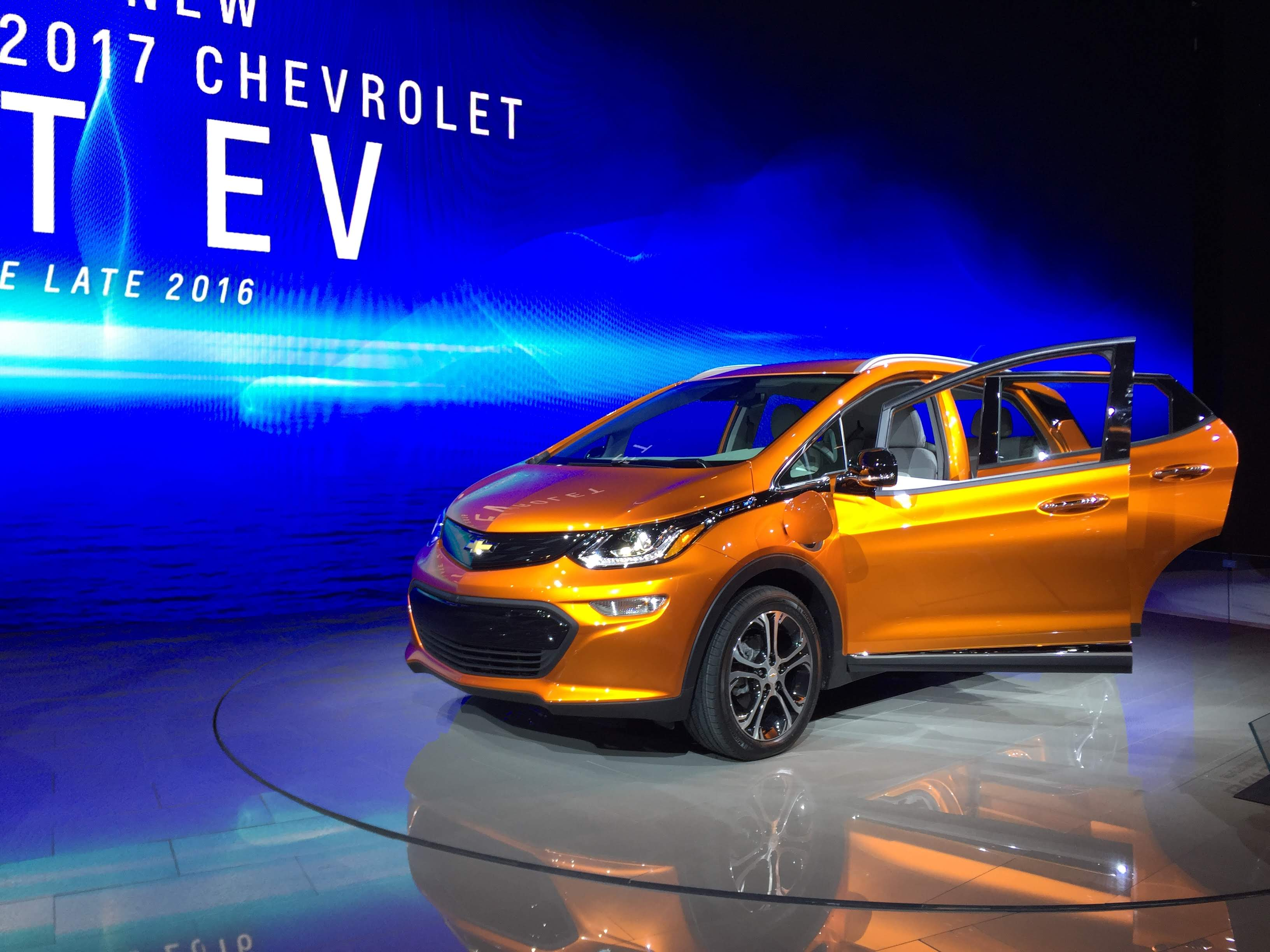
Chevrolet Bolt

== Sales ==
Chevrolet consistently ranks as among the best-selling car brands in Brazil, and it has not ranked outside the top three most popular car brands in many years.

Year	Chevrolet
2018	434,364
2019	475,684
2020	338,549
2021	242,108
2022	291,418
2023	328,020
2024	314,956

== Criticism and controversy ==
In January 2019, after recording financial losses, General Motors Brazil presented a plan to restructure the company in Brazil. The Analysis & Opinion column of Jornal Já pointed this out as "blackmail", given the company's history:

What the world's largest automobile company is doing in Brazil is a scandalous synthesis of the prevailing spirit at the top of large multinational companies. (...) Claiming financial losses in its Brazilian operations, GM threatened to leave the country. An ultimatum? No, blatant blackmail.

(...) [I]t is hard to believe that the Brazilian market leader was not able to plan in advance for the slowdown in its activities over the next two years and, in the middle of the summer season, has to resort to a series of blackmail measures, many of them based on the labor reform of November 2017. It is an embarrassing situation for any executive. (...)

The most astonishing thing about this story is that, recently, during the government of José Ivo Sartori, from the PMDB (2015-2018), GM obtained tax advantages to invest R$1.5 billion in an expansion of production capacity that would be implemented in 2019. The whole thing will fall into the lap of the new governor Eduardo Leite, from the PSDB (2019-2022).
