= Chevrolet Sonic =

The Chevrolet Sonic may refer to:

- Chevrolet Sonic (crossover), a subcompact crossover SUV sold from 2026
- Chevrolet Sonic (2012), a subcompact hatchback/sedan, the second generation of the Chevrolet Aveo
