= Chevrolet Tracker =

The Chevrolet Tracker is an automotive nameplate that has been used by Chevrolet for two different vehicle lines.

- Chevrolet Tracker (Americas), compact SUV produced since 1988, spanning two generations based on the Suzuki Vitara/Escudo/Sidekick
- Chevrolet Trax, subcompact crossover that is marketed as the Tracker in South America and Russia until 2020
- Chevrolet Tracker (2019), subcompact crossover for Chinese and Latin American markets, replacing the Chevrolet Trax
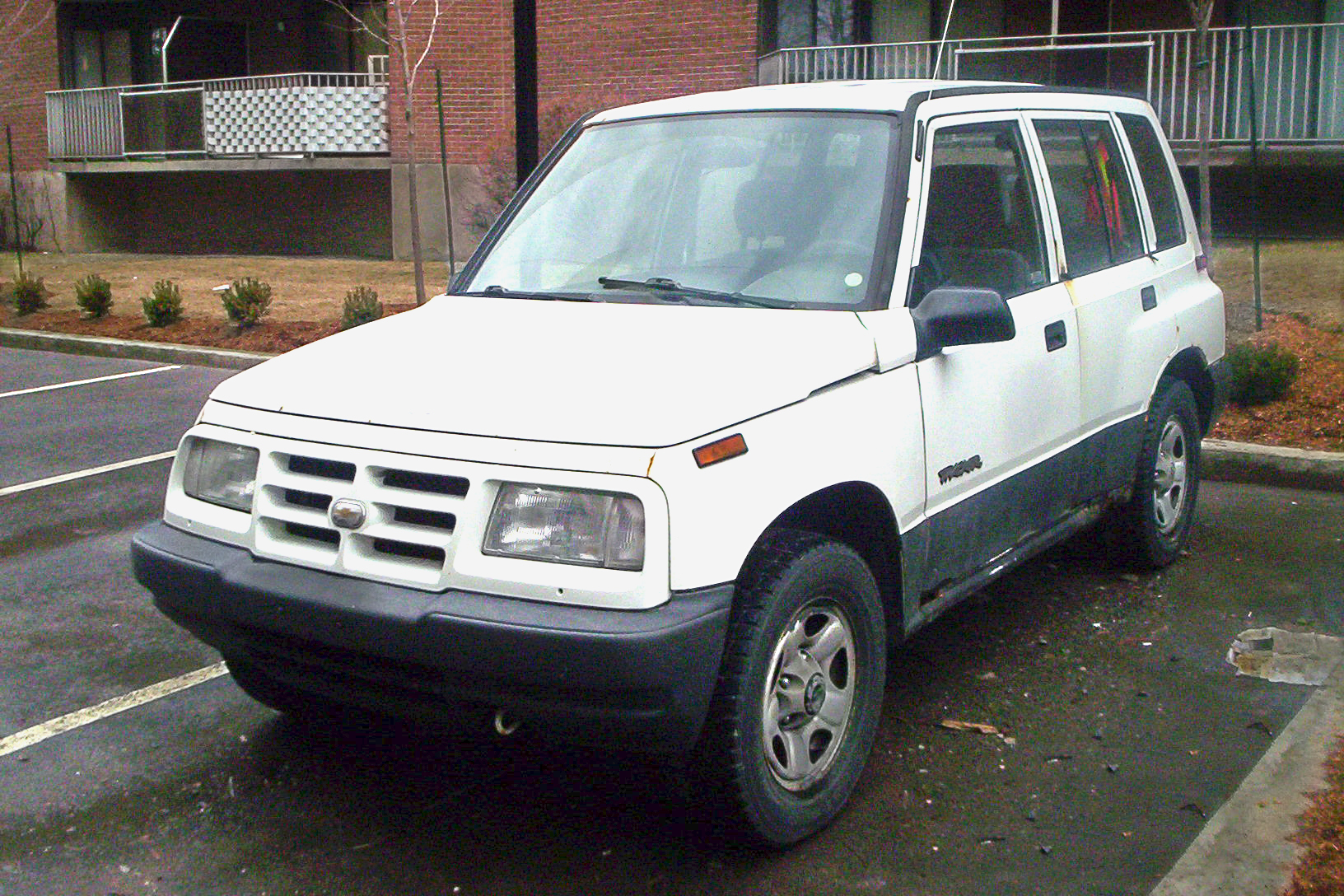
1998 Chevrolet Tracker

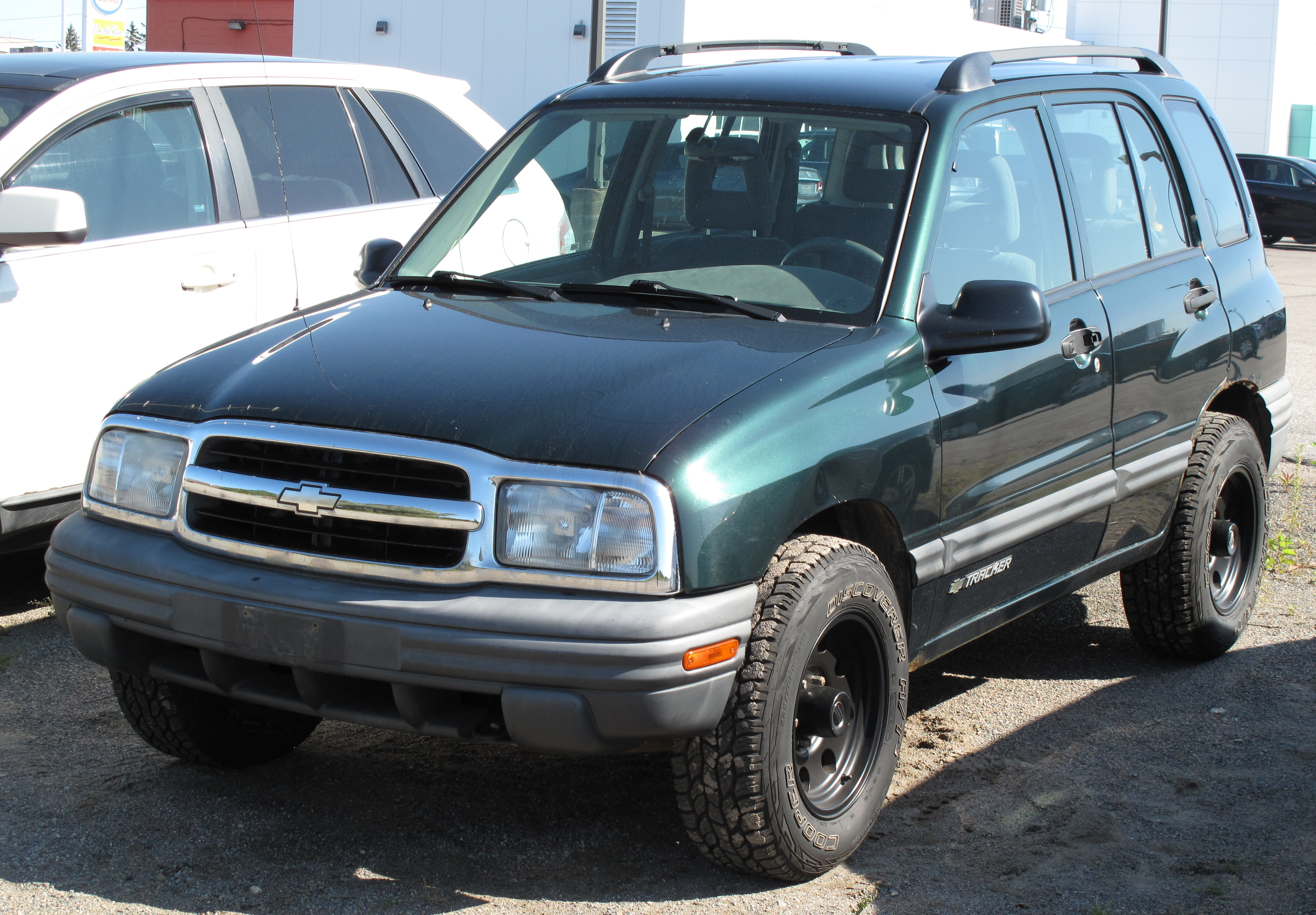
1999–2004 Chevrolet Tracker

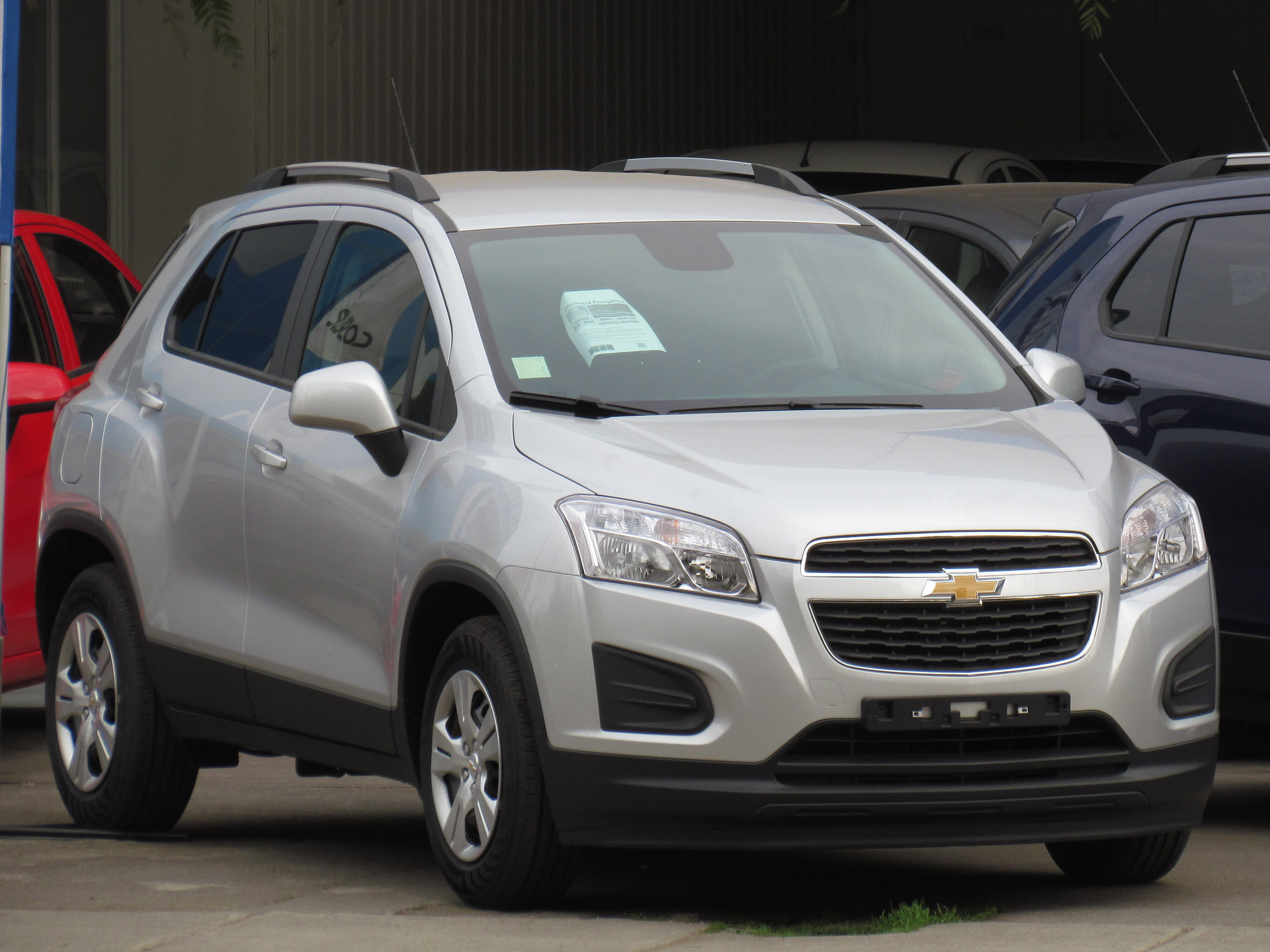
2013 Chevrolet Tracker

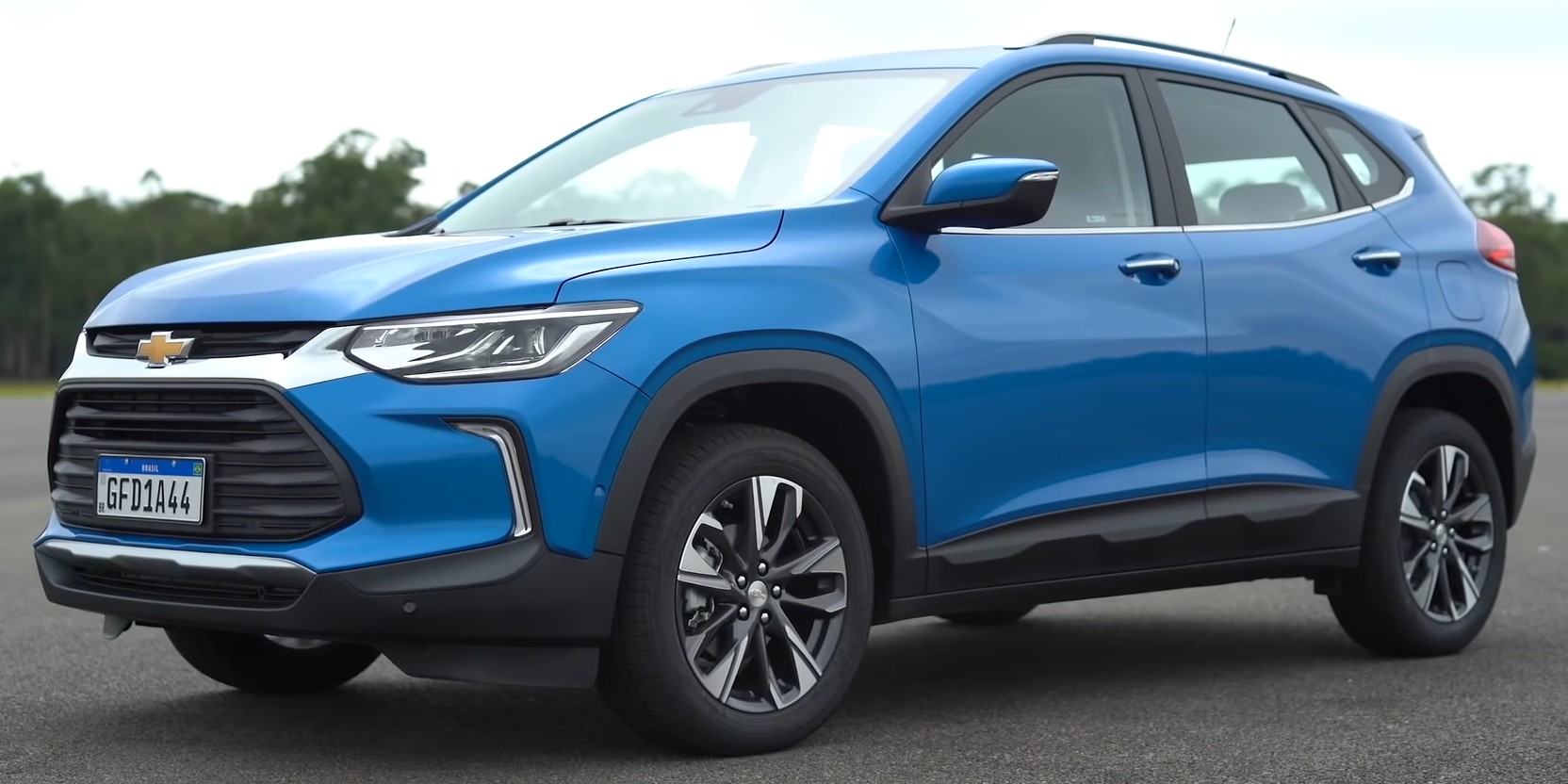
2021 Chevrolet Tracker
