= GM GEM platform =

Modern economy car platform

Overview
- Manufacturer: General Motors
- Also called: Global Emerging Markets
- Production: 2016–present

Body and chassis
- Class: subcompact (B); compact (C)
- Layout: transverse front engine, front-wheel drive

Chronology
- Predecessor: Gamma; GM-PATAC K
- Successor: GEM

Global Emerging Markets, better known in acronym form as GEM, is the name of an automotive platform in use by General Motors for various vehicles sold in markets of the developing world, where many GM vehicles designed for the United States and wealthier parts of China are too expensive for most consumers.

Development of GEM in particular was largely done by GM's joint venture SAIC-GM in China. It was developed by the GM-SAIC joint venture Pan Asia Technical Automotive Center (PATAC). Creating the platform reportedly came at a cost of approximately 5 billion dollars to GM, much of the funds for which were accumulated by exiting several unprofitable markets in Europe and Africa in 2017.

== History ==
Prior to 2015, GM primarily sold slightly refreshed versions of aging American models to developing markets. These included the likes of the Chevrolet Lanos and Daewoo Lacetti, both of which have been manufactured well past the introduction of new models in their segments (since 2002 and 2003, respectively for these examples). In August 2015, the conglomerate announced their plans to invest billions of dollars into the development of a singular platform for their secondary markets for introduction in the next 5 years.

In September 2019, Chevrolet revealed the second generation Onix sedan, the first vehicle to be underpinned by the GEM platform. GM anticipates that the markets in question will begin to outpace their established markets in new vehicle introduction from 2020 to 2030.

== Vehicles ==
The following vehicles use this platform:

=== Buick ===
==== Current ====
- Excelle (second generation; 2018–2023)
- Encore (second generation; 2019–2023)
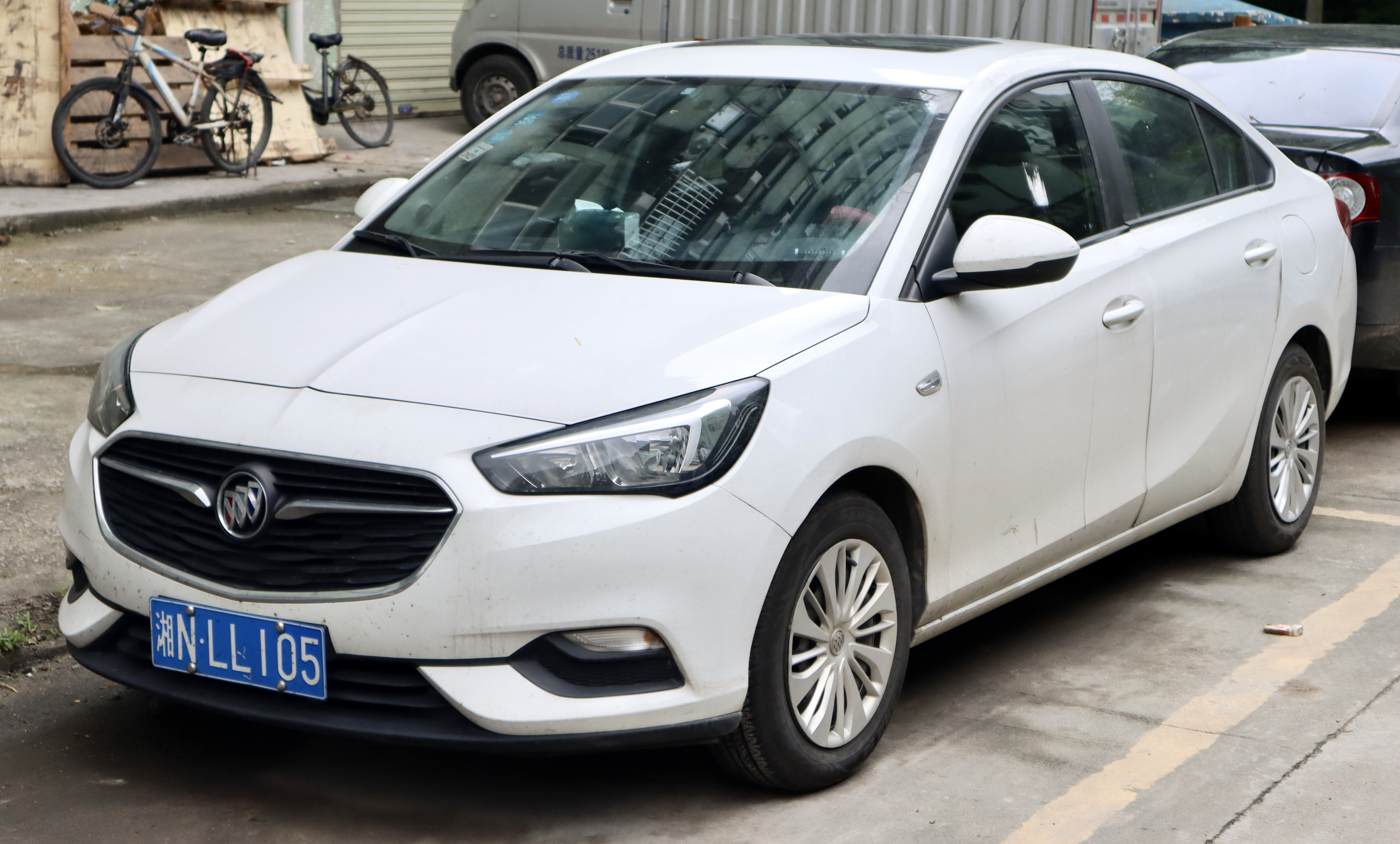
Buick Excelle

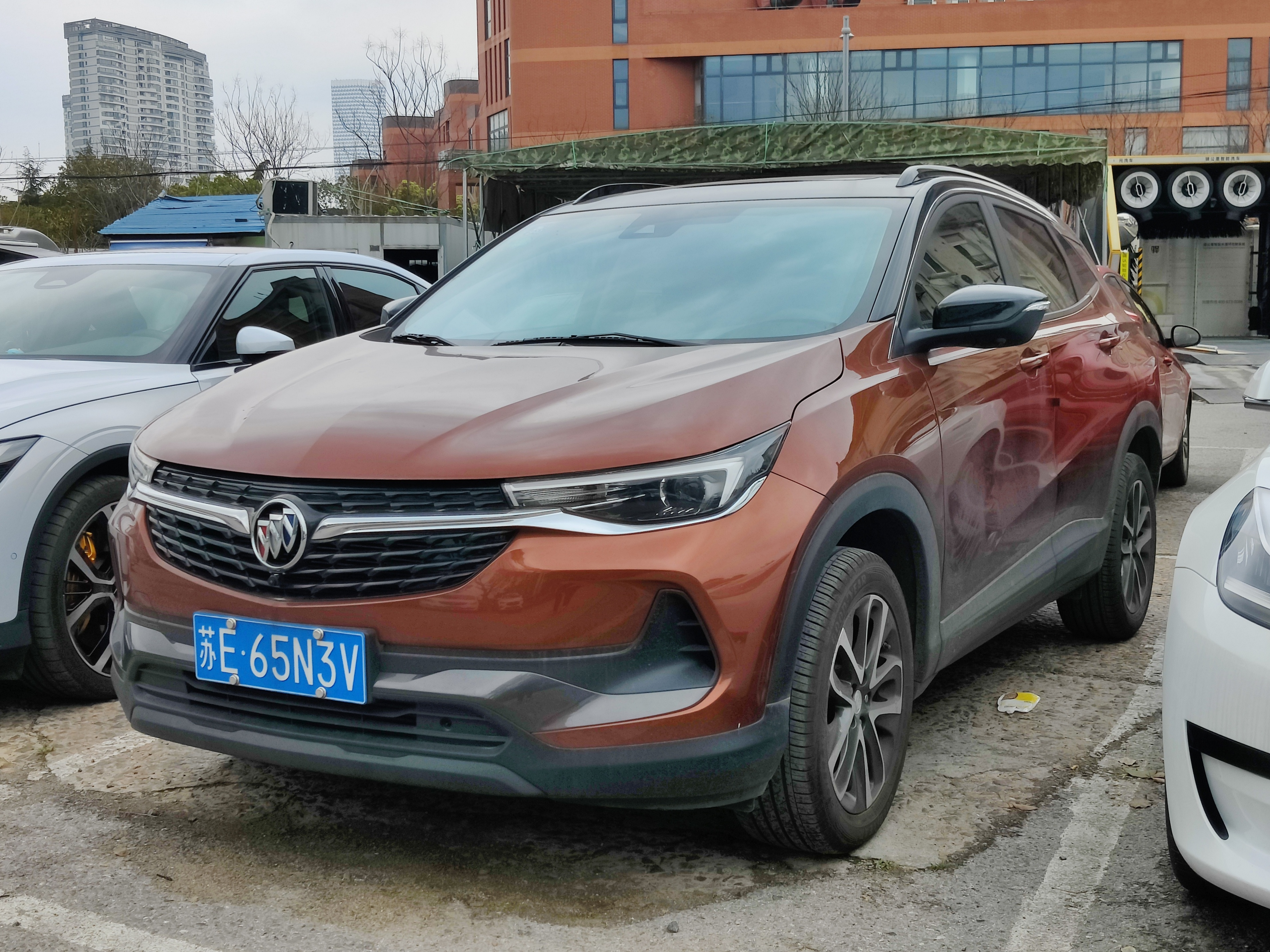
Buick Encore

=== Chevrolet ===
==== Current ====
- Tracker (fourth generation; 2019–present)
- Onix (second generation, 2019–present)
- Sonic (first generation, 2026-present)
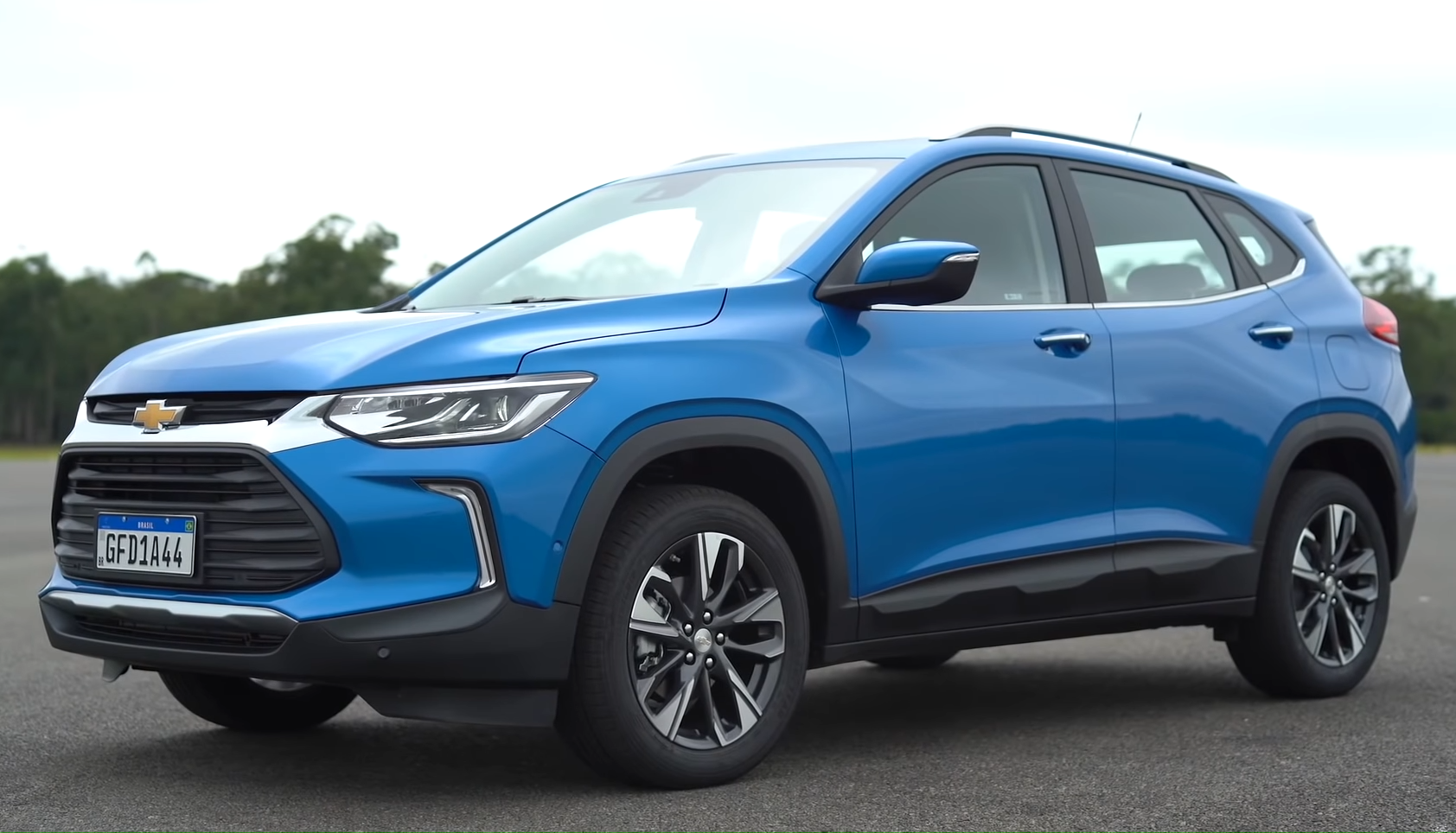
Chevrolet Tracker

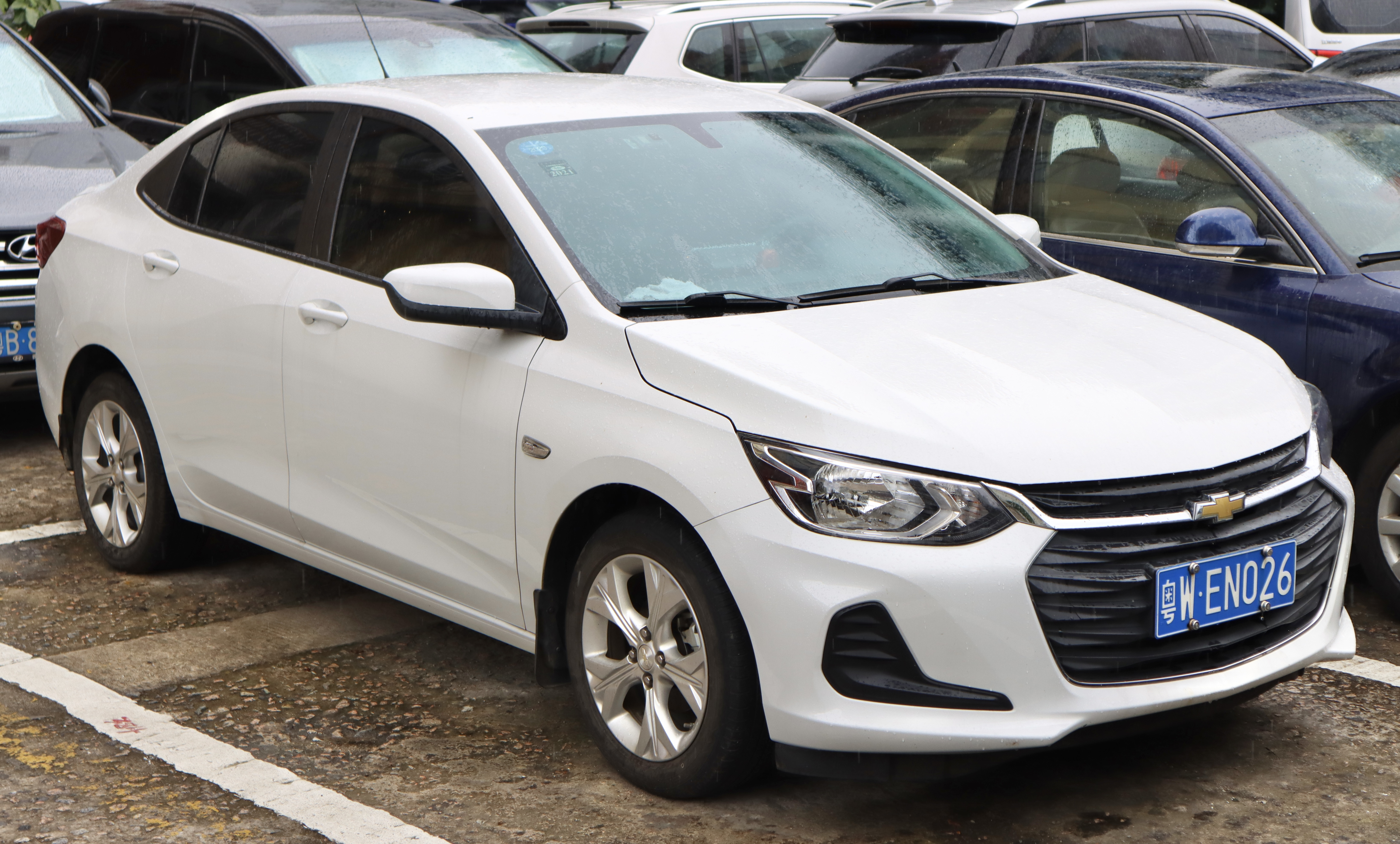
Chevrolet Onix

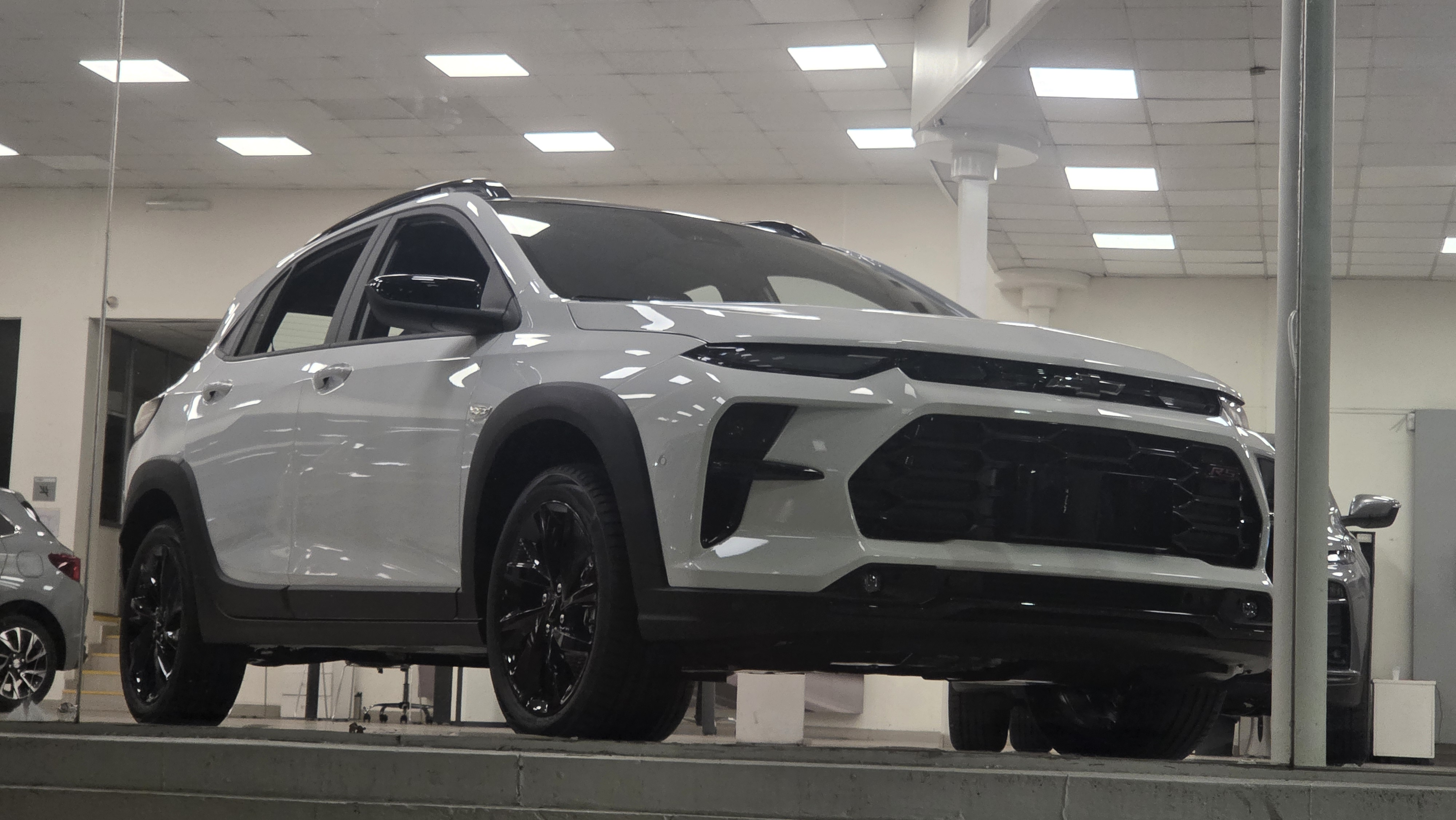
Chevrolet Sonic

== See also ==
- General Motors, the parent company of all marques that use this platform
- Chevrolet and Buick, the marques of GM that currently use this platform
- List of GM platforms, a list of all platforms GM has produced since its inception
- SAIC-GM, the joint venture that manufactures this platform
- Pan Asia Technical Automotive Center (PATAC), the joint organization that designed this platform
- Car platform, for further understanding of the component type described here
