= Chevrolet Tracker (2019) =

Subcompact crossover SUV

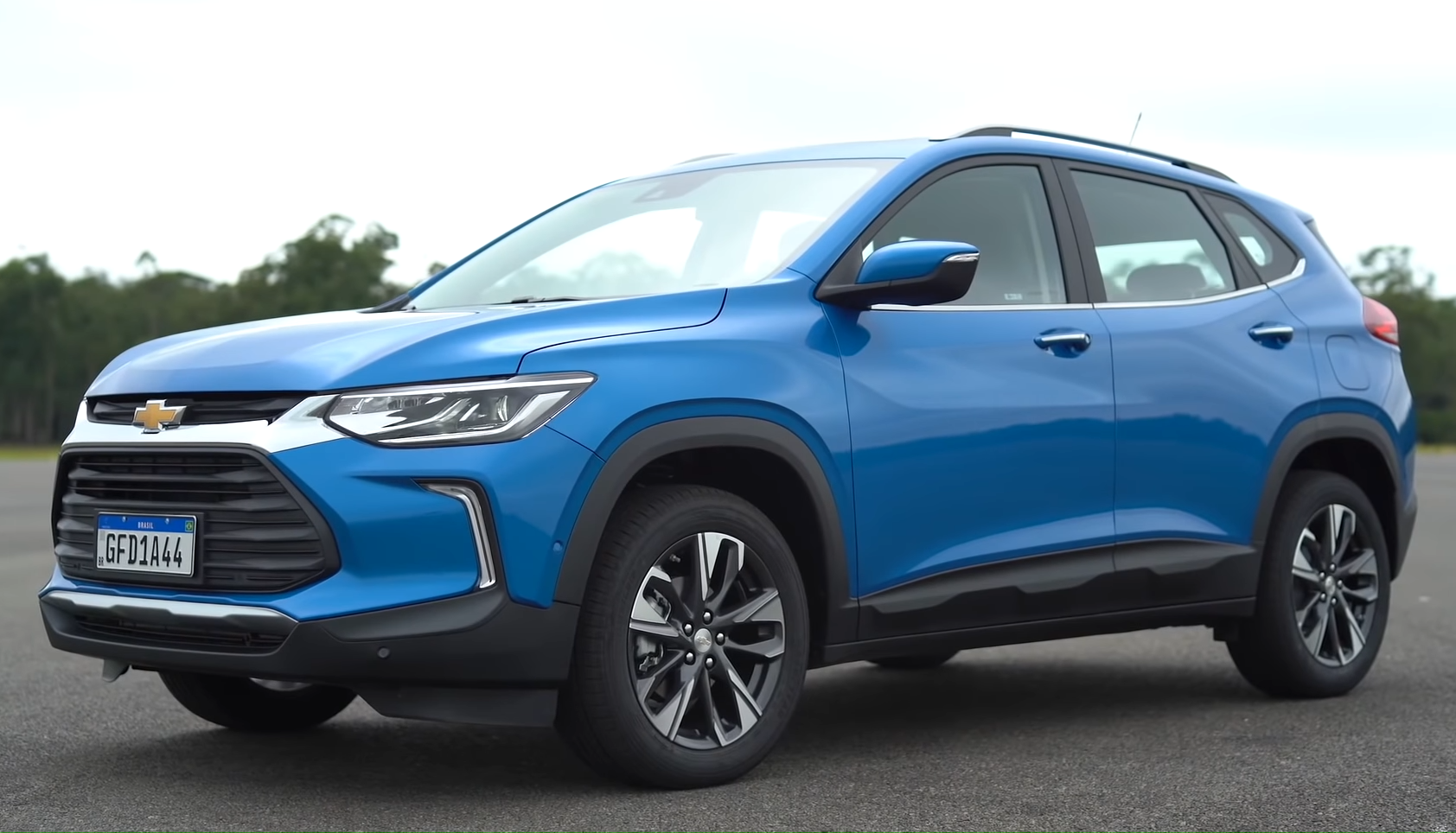
- 2021 Chevrolet Tracker (pre-facelift)

Overview
- Manufacturer: General Motors
- Production: 2019–present
- Model years: 2020–present
- Assembly: China: Shenyang, Liaoning (SAIC-GM) (2019–2025); Brazil: São Caetano do Sul (GM Brasil); Argentina: Alvear, Santa Fe (GM Argentina, 2022–present); Uzbekistan: Asaka (UzAuto Motors, 2022–present); Azerbaijan: Hajiqabul (AzerMash) (2021–present)
- Designer: Hao Huang; Zongheng Sun

Body and chassis
- Class: Subcompact crossover SUV
- Body style: 5-door SUV
- Layout: Front-engine, front-wheel-drive
- Platform: GM GEM platform
- Related: Buick Encore (second generation); Chevrolet Montana (third generation); Chevrolet Onix (second generation)

Powertrain
- Engine: Petrol: 1.0 L turbo I3; 1.2 L L4H turbo I3; 1.3 L L3Z turbo I3; 1.5 L LJV turbo I4
- Transmission: 6-speed manual; 6-speed automatic; 6-speed DCT; CVT

Dimensions
- Wheelbase: 2,570 mm (101.2 in)
- Length: 4,270 mm (168.1 in)
- Width: 1,791 mm (70.5 in)
- Height: 1,602–1,627 mm (63.1–64.1 in)

Chronology
- Predecessor: Chevrolet Trax
- Successor: Chevrolet Groove (Philippines)

The Chevrolet Tracker is a subcompact crossover SUV manufactured by General Motors since 2019. Positioned as a successor to the Trax (also called the Tracker in several markets), it is produced in Brazil and Argentina for the Latin American market, and in China by SAIC-GM for the Chinese market. Despite the use of the Tracker name, the Tracker is not related to the model sold in North America as a rebadged Suzuki Vitara from the 1990s to the 2000s.

== Overview ==
The Tracker in the Chinese market was revealed in 2019 alongside the Trailblazer. The Chinese-market Tracker was designed to replace the Trax in China, and shares its Chinese name (Chinese: 创酷; pinyin: chuàng kù) as the Trax. The Global Emerging Markets (GEM) platform which the Chinese market Tracker was built on was designed for developing automotive markets including China and Latin America.

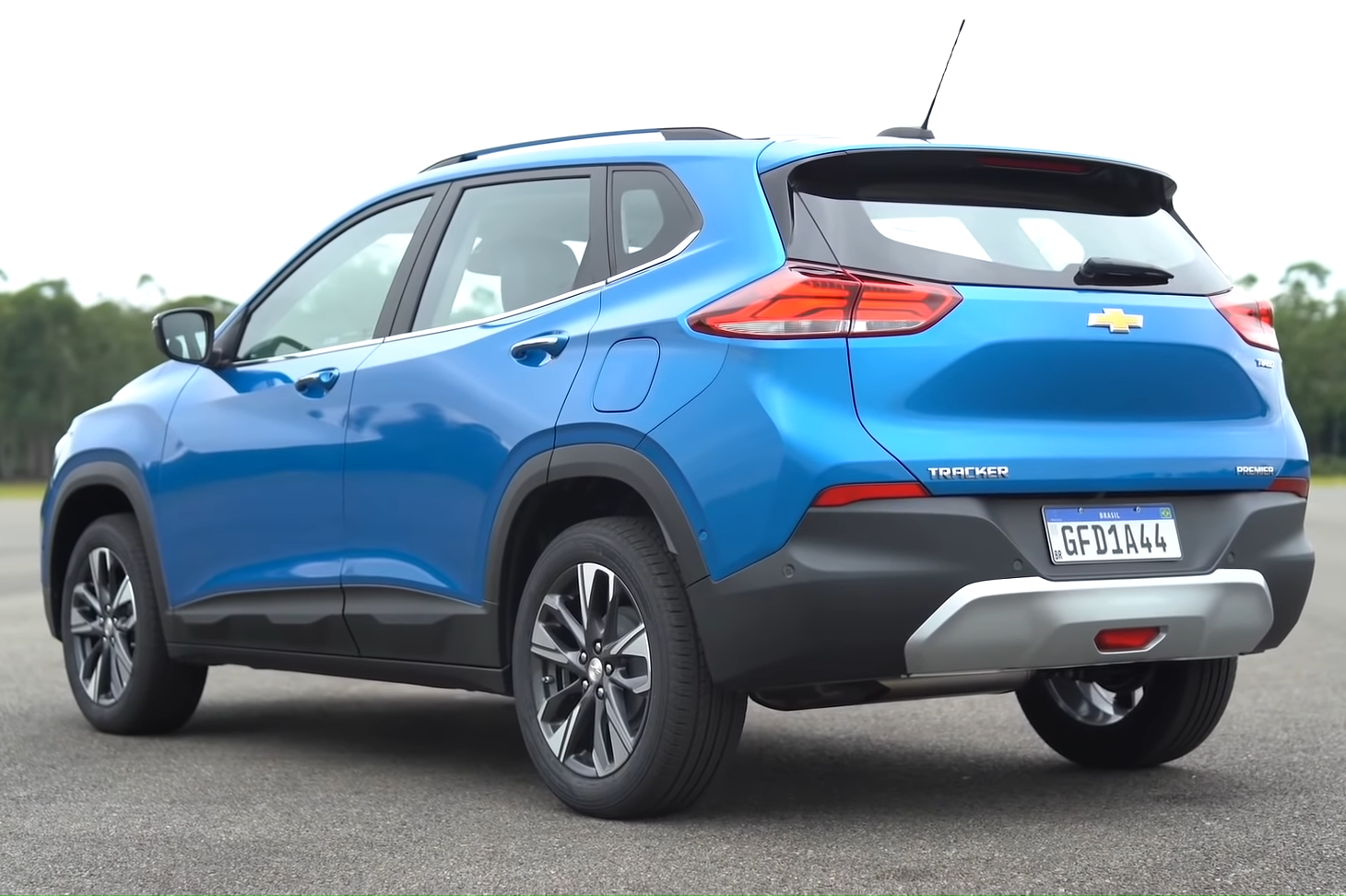
Rear view (pre-facelift)

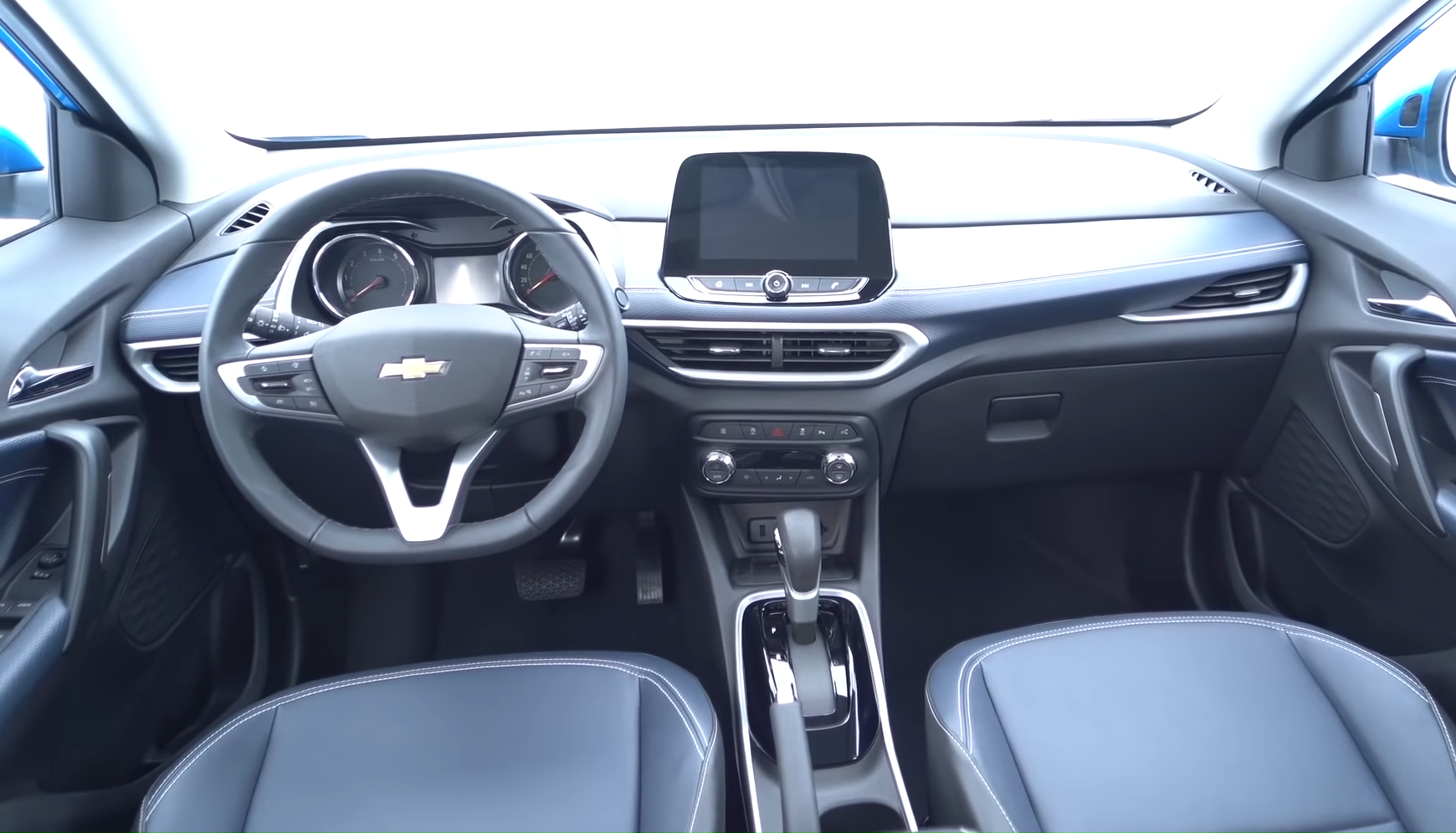
Interior (pre-facelift)

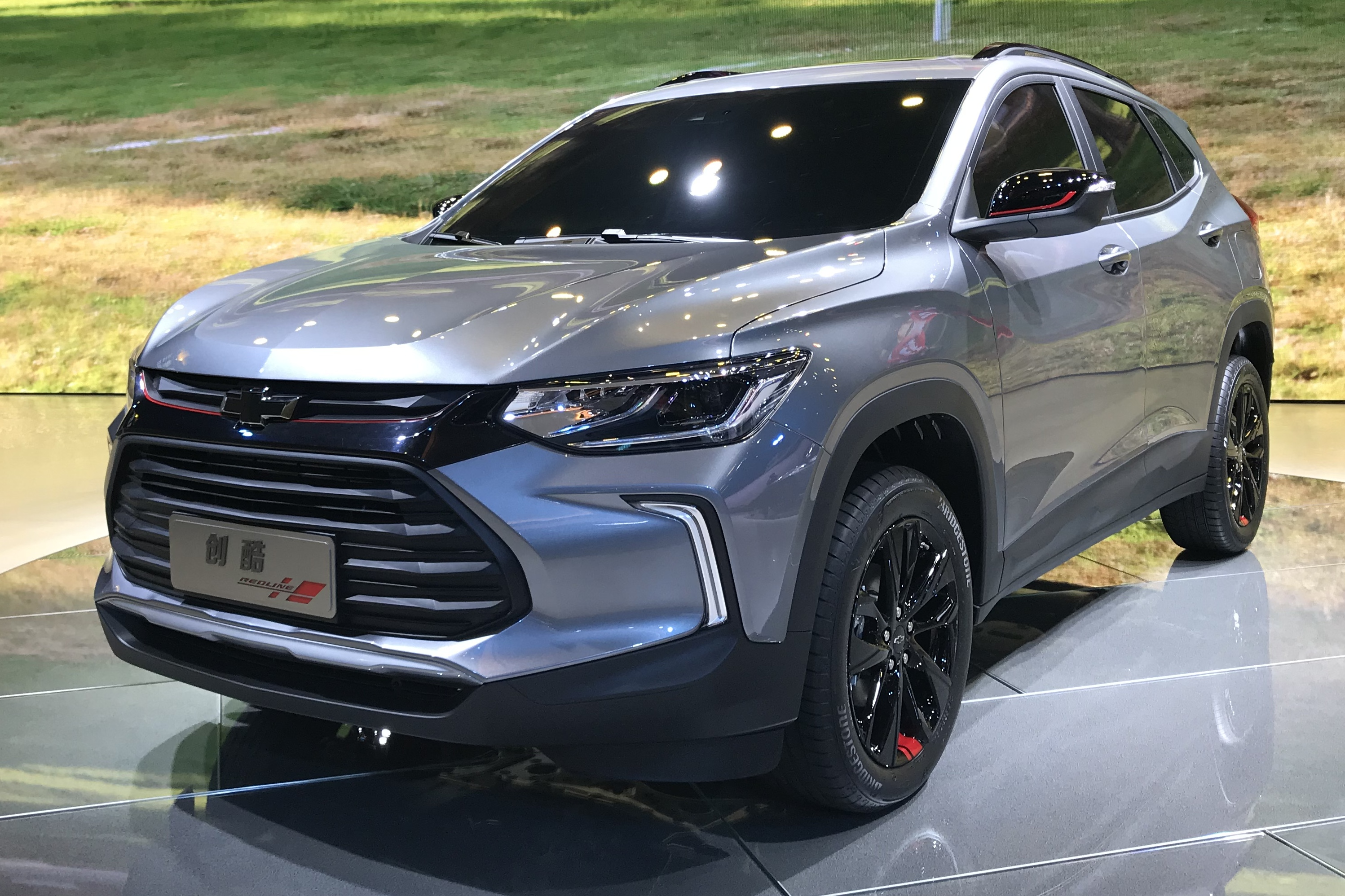
Chevrolet Tracker Redline (China; pre-facelift)

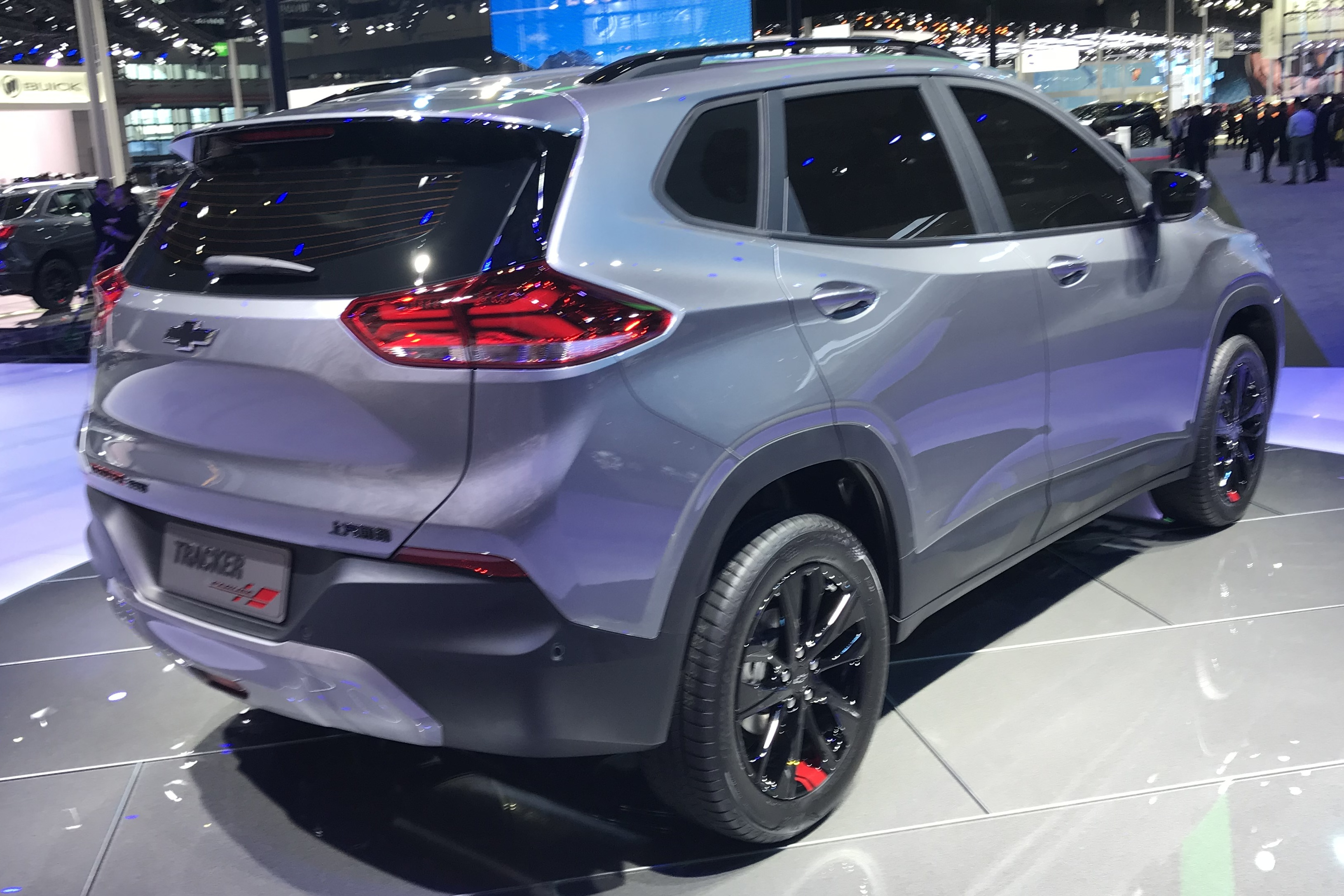
Chevrolet Tracker Redline (China; pre-facelift)

=== Facelift ===
The facelifted Tracker was unveiled on 2 July 2025 for Latin America, featuring redesigned LED front lighting, a revised grille and bumpers, new wheels and taillights, plus an updated interior with a fully digital instrument display and an 11-inch MyLink infotainment screen.

2026 Tracker LT (facelift)

== Markets ==
=== China ===
The Chinese market Tracker (Chinese: 创酷; pinyin: chuàng kù) is available with a 3-cylinder 1.0-litre turbo engine producing 84 kW (113 hp; 114 PS) and a 3-cylinder 1.3-litre turbo engine producing 121 kW (162 hp; 165 PS). It was discontinued in 2025, following the closure of General Motors' Shenyang plant.

=== Brazil ===
The Tracker made its Brazilian debut in 2020, with production commencing at the São Caetano do Sul assembly.

=== Mexico ===
GM announced that the Tracker would arrive in Mexico to replace the first generation Trax.

=== Philippines ===
The Tracker was unveiled in the Philippine market in July 2021 and is imported from China. It was replaced by the Groove in 2025.

=== Argentina ===
In April 2022, the Tracker began to be produced in Argentina by General Motors de Argentina at the General Alvear factory in Santa Fe Province. US$300 million were invested to upgrade the plant, which will see its annual capacity increase from 80,000 to 115,000 vehicles. It is the only B-segment SUV made in Argentina. 80% of its production is exported. The 1.2-litre engine is imported from the Joinville factory in Brazil.

=== Uzbekistan ===
The Tracker is also produced in Uzbekistan by UzAuto Motors at the Asaka plant since July 2022, replacing the China-imported model. The model is offered with the 1.2-litre turbocharged engine and marketed as the "Tracker 2" to avoid confusion with the previous Trax-based model, which was earlier offered in the region under the same title. Unlike Latin American production, the engines for the Tracker are built locally at UzAuto Motors Powertrain, sister company to UzAuto Motors.

The production is planned to reach annual capacity of 70,000 units and is part of the two stage progression of GEM platform integration in Uzbekistan. The second stage will start in the first quarter of 2023 with the production of Chevrolet Onix. The overall costs of the GEM production lines are estimated at over US$600 million for UzAuto Motors.

== Safety ==
The Chevrolet Tracker is equipped with six airbags and electronic stability control as standard.

During some of Latin NCAP's crash tests on the Tracker, its pyrotechnic seatbelt pretensioners ignited insulation material at the base of the B-pillar, starting a fire and prompting a recall by Chevrolet. Additionally, the seatbelt buckles failed to release normally after the crash. Latin NCAP announced that the results published for the Tracker would be for the car with the recall implemented.

Latin NCAP 3.0 test results Chevrolet Tracker + 6 Airbags (2022, similar to Euro NCAP 2014)
Test	Points	%
Overall:	5 /5 stars	
Adult occupant:	36.43	91%
Child occupant:	45.00	92%
Pedestrian:	25.99	54%
Safety assist:	35.77	83%

== Sales ==
Year	Argentina	Brazil	Chile	China	Colombia	Mexico
2019	5,705	16,333		17,845		
2020	3,407	49,378		4,442	3,594	6,487
2021	5,561	50,763	644	9,117	3,942	10,389
2022	4,229	70,813	7,284	6,421	5,480	17,060
2023	12,365	66,653	2,213	4,420	4,211	12,098
2024	10,950	69,401		300	2,559	9,531
2025	17,647	60,876		31		
