= 2012 Copa Chevrolet Montana season =

Car racing competition

Seasons
- ← 2011 2013 →

The 2012 Copa Chevrolet Montana season was the third Copa Chevrolet Montana season. It began on March 25 at the Interlagos and ended on November 11 at the Brasília, after eight rounds. For 2012 season, the championship have new scoring system.

After nine drivers became at last round with title chances, Rafael Daniel won for the third time, a new record in category.

== Teams and drivers ==
- All cars are powered by Chevrolet engines and use Chevrolet Montana chassis. All drivers were Brazilian-registered.

Team	No.	Driver	Rounds
Motortech Competições	3	Tito Morestoni	All
Nascar Motorsport	6	Diogo Pachenki	4–5
Nascar Motorsport	10	Marcelo Cesquim	7–8
Nascar Motorsport	22	Rafael Daniel	All
Nascar Motorsport	27	Christian Castro	1–3, 6
Gramacho Competições	7	Rodrigo Pimenta	All
Gramacho Competições	15	Aluizio Coelho	1–5
Gramacho Competições	96	Eduardo Garcia	6–8
Cesquim Racing	8	Ney Faustine	8
Cesquim Racing	10	Marcelo Cesquim	1–6
Cesquim Racing	20	Wagner Ebrahim	7
Cesquim Racing	47	Marconi de Abreu	1–2
Cesquim Racing	53	Ronaldo Kastropil	8
Bazzo Racing	12	Luiz Boesel	1
CKR Racing	16	Carlos Kray	6
Carlos Alves Competições	23	Marco Cozzi	All
Carlos Alves Competições	56	João Pretto	All
Hot Car Competições	25	Tiago Geronimi	All
Hot Car Competições	77	Beto Cavaleiro	All
AMG Motorsport	32	Fernando Fortes	1–3, 5–8
AMG Motorsport	38	Thiago Penido	1–3
J. Star Racing	32	Fernando Fortes	4
J. Star Racing	44	Norberto Gresse	All
J. Star Racing	54	Marcelo Tomasoni	4
J. Star Racing	88	Leandro Romera	All
Mottin Racing	46	Andersom Toso	6–7
Mottin Racing	64	Vitor Genz	7

== Race calendar and results ==
All races were held in Brazil.

Round	Circuit	Date	Pole position	Fastest lap	Winning driver	Winning team
1	Autódromo José Carlos Pace	March 25	Rafael Daniel	Rafael Daniel	Norberto Gresse	J. Star Racing
2	Autódromo Internacional de Curitiba	April 15	Tiago Geronimi	Tiago Geronimi	Tiago Geronimi	Hot Car Competições
3	Velopark, Nova Santa Rita	May 5	Rodrigo Pimenta	Rodrigo Pimenta	Leandro Romera	J. Star Racing
4	Autódromo Internacional Nelson Piquet	July 15	Tiago Geronimi	Norberto Gresse	João Pretto	Carlos Alves Competições
5	Autódromo Internacional de Cascavel	September 16	Diogo Pachenki	Marco Cozzi	Marco Cozzi	Carlos Alves Competições
6	Autódromo Internacional de Tarumã	September 30	Tiago Geronimi	Tiago Geronimi	Tiago Geronimi	Hot Car Competições
7	Autódromo Internacional de Curitiba	October 21	Tiago Geronimi	Tiago Geronimi	Rafael Daniel	Nascar Motorsport
8	Autódromo Internacional Nelson Piquet	November 11	João Pretto	João Pretto	João Pretto	Carlos Alves Competições

== Championship standings ==
- Points were awarded as follows:

Position	1	2	3	4	5	6	7	8	9	10	11	12	13	14	15	16	17	18	19	20
Standard	22	20	18	17	16	15	14	13	12	11	10	9	8	7	6	5	4	3	2	1
R8	44	40	36	34	32	30	28	26	24	22	20	18	16	14	12	10	8	6	4	2

=== Drivers' Championship ===
Pos	Driver	INT	CUR	VEL	RIO	CAS	TAR	CUR	BRA	Pts
1	Rafael Daniel	**3**	5	Ret	3	7	3	1	4	142
2	Rodrigo Pimenta	6	4	**2**	4	DSQ	10	2	2	140
3	Norberto Gresse	1	3	3	2	Ret	6	12	6	137
4	Leandro Romera	4	6	1	Ret	2	5	8	8	133
5	João Pretto	12	10	4	1	5	9	Ret	**1**	132
6	Tiago Geronimi	5	**1**	Ret	**Ret**	3	**1**	**4**	13	118
7	Fernando Fortes	11	11	9	9	4	12	6	7	117
8	Beto Cavaleiro	10	12	7	5	8	11	11	11	111
9	Marco Cozzi	2	2	8	6	1	4	Ret	DSQ	107
10	Marcelo Cesquim	Ret	9	Ret	7	6	13	10	5	94
11	Tito Morestoni	7	8	Ret	Ret	9	14	5	10	89
12	Christian Castro	Ret	7	6			2			49
13	Aluizio Coelho	9	Ret	5	Ret	Ret				28
14	Marconi de Abreu	13	13							16
15	Andersom Toso						7	Ret		14
16	Eduardo Garcia						8	9†	3†	13
16	Luiz Boesel	8								13
16	Marcelo Tomasoni				8					13
19	Thiago Penido	Ret	Ret	10						11
20	Diogo Pachenki				Ret	**Ret**				0
Drivers ineligible for championship
	Wagner Ebrahim							3		0
	Vitor Genz							7		0
	Ney Faustine								9	0
	Ronaldo Kastropil								10	0
	Carlos Kray						Ret			0
Pos	Driver	INT	CUR	VEL	RIO	CAS	TAR	CUR	BRA	Pts

Colour	Result
Gold	Winner
Silver	Second place
Bronze	Third place
Green	Points classification
Blue	Non-points classification
Blue	Non-classified finish (NC)
Purple	Retired, not classified (Ret)
Red	Did not qualify (DNQ)
Red	Did not pre-qualify (DNPQ)
Black	Disqualified (DSQ)
White	Did not start (DNS)
White	Withdrew (WD)
White	Race cancelled (C)
Blank	Did not practice (DNP)
Blank	Did not arrive (DNA)
Blank	Excluded (EX)

**Bold** – Pole
Italics – Fastest Lap

Notes

† Eduardo Garcia were eligible for Driver's Championship standings in Curitiba and Brasília.

=== Teams' Championship ===
Pos	Team	INT	CUR	VEL	RIO	CAS	TAR	CUR	BRA	Pts
1	J. Star Racing	1	3	1	2	2	5	8	6	283
1	J. Star Racing	4	6	3	6	Ret	6	12	8	283
2	Carlos Alves Competições	2	2	4	1	1	4	Ret	1	239
2	Carlos Alves Competições	12	10	8	6	5	4	Ret	DSQ	239
2	Nascar Motorsport	3	5	6	3	7	2	1	4	239
2	Nascar Motorsport	Ret	7	Ret	Ret	Ret	3	10	5	239
4	Hot Car Competições	5	1	7	5	3	1	4	11	229
4	Hot Car Competições	10	12	Ret	Ret	8	11	11	13	229
5	Gramacho Competições	6	4	2	4	Ret	8	2	2	181
5	Gramacho Competições	9	Ret	5	Ret	DSQ	10	9	3	181
6	AMG Motorsport	11	11	9		4	12	6	7	116
6	AMG Motorsport	Ret	Ret	10						116
7	Motortech Competições	7	8	Ret	Ret	9	14	5	11	89
8	Cesquim Racing	13	9	Ret	7	6	13	3	9	62
8	Cesquim Racing	Ret	13						10	62
9	Mottin Racing						7	7		14
9	Mottin Racing							Ret		14
10	Bazzo Racing	8								13
Teams ineligible for championship
	CKR Racing						Ret			0
Pos	Team	INT	CUR	VEL	RIO	CAS	TAR	CUR	BRA	Pts

Colour	Result
Gold	Winner
Silver	Second place
Bronze	Third place
Green	Points classification
Blue	Non-points classification
Blue	Non-classified finish (NC)
Purple	Retired, not classified (Ret)
Red	Did not qualify (DNQ)
Red	Did not pre-qualify (DNPQ)
Black	Disqualified (DSQ)
White	Did not start (DNS)
White	Withdrew (WD)
White	Race cancelled (C)
Blank	Did not practice (DNP)
Blank	Did not arrive (DNA)
Blank	Excluded (EX)

**Bold** – Pole
Italics – Fastest Lap
