= Stock Light =

Brazilian touring car series

- Category: Touring cars
- Country: Brazil
- Inaugural season: 1993
- Constructors: Chevrolet
- Tyre suppliers: Hankook
- Drivers' champion: (Brazil) Felipe Barrichello Bartz
- Teams' champion: (Brazil) SG28 Racing
- Official website: www.stockproseries.com.br/stock-series

Stock Light is a touring car racing series based in Brazil promoted by Vicar. The series returned in 2018 as Stock Light, having replaced the previous Campeonato Brasileiro de Turismo, Copa Chevrolet Montana formerly known as Stock Car Copa Vicar, Stock Car Light, and Stock Car B which had run since 1993. The series serves as the official access category to Stock Car Brasil, as well as having manufacturer support from Chevrolet. The series champion is awarded a R$ 2.5 million scholarship to compete in Stock Car. In 2025 the series was rebranded back to Stock Light after three years under the Stock Series name, after complains about the name similarities between the main series Stock Car Pro Series.

== History ==
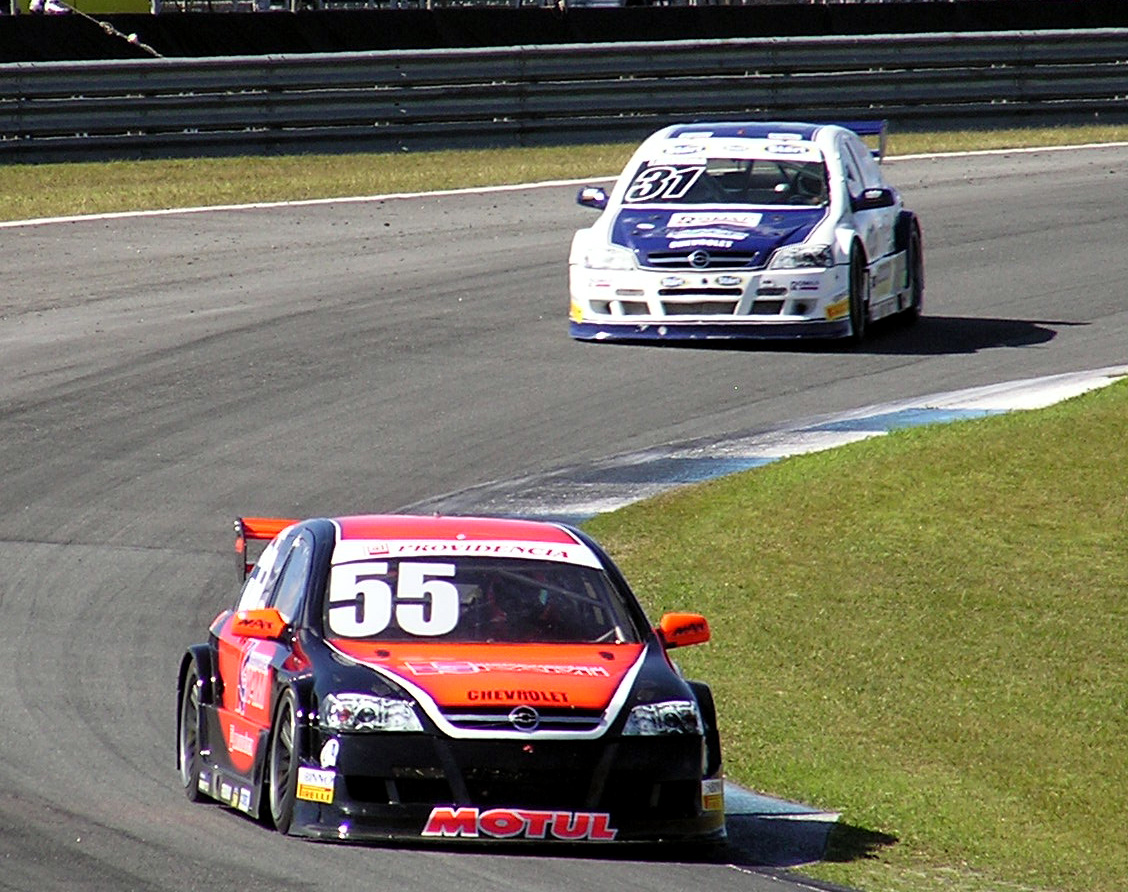
Stock Car Light Curitiba, 2006.

In 1993, Stock Car B was created in order to facilitate the access of newcomers to the Stock Car Brasil, until 1999 the category competed in the same grid as Stock Car Brasil.

In 2000 the name of the series was changed to Stock Car Brasil Light and began competing separately from Stock Car Brasil.

In 2010, the merger between the Copa Vicar and Pick Up Racing resulted in the creation of the Copa Chevrolet Montana, with the engine and the appearance of the pick-ups, inspired by the street version of the Chevrolet Montana.

In 2013, the Campeonato Brasileiro de Turismo (Brazilian Touring Championship) replaced the Copa Chevrolet Montana. The chassis, designed by JL company was similar to the one used in Stock Car Brasil with a V8 5.7 LS engine.

In 2022, Stock Light was rebranded to Stock Series and officially designated as the support series to Stock Car Brasil, using cars that resemble the Chevrolet Cruze. Series promoter Vicar announced that Stock Car, Stock Series, and F4 Brazil would be switching to Hankook tyres from 2023 onwards, replacing Pirelli. On 8 December 2022, Vicar announced that the Stock Series would implement a cost cap of R$750,000 from 2023 onwards, alongside a R$700,000 prize pool.

In 2025 the series was rebranded back to Stock Light after three years under the Stock Series name, after complains about the name similarities between the main series Stock Car Pro Series.

== Scoring system ==
=== 2010–2011 ===
Pos	1	2	3	4	5	6	7	8	9	10	11	12	13	14	15
Race	25	20	16	14	12	10	9	8	7	6	5	4	3	2	1

=== 2012 ===
Position	1	2	3	4	5	6	7	8	9	10	11	12	13	14	15	16	17	18	19	20
Standard	22	20	18	17	16	15	14	13	12	11	10	9	8	7	6	5	4	3	2	1
Final Round	44	40	36	34	32	30	28	26	24	22	20	18	16	14	12	10	8	6	4	2

=== 2013 ===
Position	1	2	3	4	5	6	7	8	9	10	11	12	13	14	15	16	17	18	19	20
Standard	24	20	18	17	16	15	14	13	12	11	10	9	8	7	6	5	4	3	2	1
Final Round	48	40	36	34	32	30	28	26	24	22	20	18	16	14	12	10	8	6	4	2

=== 2014 ===
Points were awarded for each race at an event, to the driver/s of a car that completed at least 75% of the race distance and was running at the completion of the race, up to a maximum of 48 points per event.

Points format	Position																			
Points format	1st	2nd	3rd	4th	5th	6th	7th	8th	9th	10th	11th	12th	13th	14th	15th	16th	17th	18th	19th	20th
Feature races	24	20	18	17	16	15	14	13	12	11	10	9	8	7	6	5	4	3	2	1
Qualifying races	15	13	12	11	10	9	8	7	6	5	4	3	2	1	0	0	0	0	0	0
Final race	48	40	36	34	32	30	28	26	24	22	20	18	16	14	12	10	8	6	4	2

- Qualifying races: Used for the first of each event.
- Feature races: Used for the second race of each event and singles round.
- Final race: Used for the last round of the season with double points.

=== 2015–2016 ===
Points were awarded for each race at an event, to the driver/s of a car that completed at least 75% of the race distance and was running at the completion of the race, up to a maximum of 40 points per event. Double points were awarded at the final race.

Points format	Position															
Points format	1st	2nd	3rd	4th	5th	6th	7th	8th	9th	10th	11th	12th	13th	14th	15th	16th
Races 1–11	20	16	14	13	12	11	10	9	8	7	6	5	4	3	2	1
Final race	40	32	28	26	24	22	20	18	16	14	12	10	8	6	4	2

=== 2017 ===
Points are awarded for each race at an event to the driver/s of a car that completed at least 75% of the race distance and was running at the completion of the race.

Points format	Position											
Points format	1st	2nd	3rd	4th	5th	6th	7th	8th	9th	10th	11th	12th
Race	20	16	13	11	9	7	6	5	4	3	2	1
Final race	40	32	26	22	18	14	12	10	8	6	4	2

- Race: Used for the first and second race, with partially reversed (top six) of each event.
- Final race: Used for the last round of the season with double points.

=== 2018–2019 ===
Points are awarded for each race at an event to the driver/s of a car that completed at least 75% of the race distance and was running at the completion of the race.

Points format	Position														
Points format	1st	2nd	3rd	4th	5th	6th	7th	8th	9th	10th	11th	12th	13th	14th	15th
Feature races	30	26	22	19	17	15	13	11	9	7	5	4	3	2	1
Sprint races	20	17	14	12	10	8	6	5	4	3	2	1	0		
Final race	60	52	44	38	34	30	26	22	18	14	10	8	6	4	2

- Feature Race: Used for the first race.
- Sprint Race: Used for the first and second race, with partially reversed (top ten) of each event.
- Final race: Used for the last round of the season with double points.

=== Current system ===
Points are awarded for each race at an event to the driver/s of a car that completed at least 75% of the race distance and was running at the completion of the race. Before the last round, the four worst results are discarded. Races in which a driver has been disqualified cannot be discarded. The second race of each event is held with partially reversed top ten grid.

Points format	Position																			
Points format	1st	2nd	3rd	4th	5th	6th	7th	8th	9th	10th	11th	12th	13th	14th	15th	16th	17th	18th	19th	20th
Race 1	30	26	22	19	17	15	14	13	12	11	10	9	8	7	6	5	4	3	2	1
Race 2	24	20	18	17	16	15	14	13	12	11	10	9	8	7	6	5	4	3	2	1

== Champions ==
Season	Series name	Champion	Car	Team
1993	Stock Car Brasil B	Carlos Col; George Lemonias	Chevrolet Opala	TNG/Rodão
1994	Stock Car Brasil B	Nonô Figueiredo	Chevrolet Omega	Team NapoLub
1995	Stock Car Brasil B	Ariel Barranco	Chevrolet Omega	Ultimate Speed
1996	Stock Car Brasil B	Alessandro Weiss	Chevrolet Omega	Conserva Pescador
1997	Stock Car Brasil B	Cacá Bueno	Chevrolet Omega	Brahma Sports Team
1998	Stock Car Brasil B	Carlos Cunha	Chevrolet Omega	A.Mattheis Motorsport
1999	Stock Car Brasil B	Mario Covas Netto	Chevrolet Omega	WB Motorsport
2000	Stock Car Brasil Light	Rogerio Motta	Chevrolet Omega	Carlos Alves Competições
2001	Stock Car Brasil Light	Thiago Marques	Chevrolet Omega	Action Power Racing
2002	Stock Car Brasil Light	Mateus Greipel	Chevrolet Omega	FF Racing
2003	Stock Car Brasil Light	Luis Carreira Jr.	Chevrolet Astra	RC Competições
2004	Stock Car Brasil Light	Diogo Pachenki	Chevrolet Astra	PowerTech
2005	Stock Car Brasil Light	Renato Jader David	Chevrolet Astra	Carreira Racing
2006	Stock Car Brasil Light	Marcos Gomes	Chevrolet Astra	Nova/RR Competições
2007	Stock Car Brasil Light	Norberto Gresse	Chevrolet Astra	AMG Motorsport
2008	Copa Vicar	Fabio Carreira	Mitsubishi Lancer	RCM Motorsport
2009	Copa Vicar	Rafael Daniel	Peugeot 407	Full Time Sports
2010	Copa Chevrolet Montana	Diogo Pachenki	Chevrolet Montana	Nascar Motorsport
2011	Copa Chevrolet Montana	Rafael Daniel	Chevrolet Montana	Gramacho Competições
2012	Copa Chevrolet Montana	Rafael Daniel	Chevrolet Montana	Nascar Motorsport
2013	Brasileiro de Turismo	Felipe Fraga	JL G-12 Stock Car	W2 Racing
2014	Brasileiro de Turismo	Guilherme Salas	JL G-12 Stock Car	W2 Racing
2015	Brasileiro de Turismo	Márcio Campos	JL G-12 Stock Car	Motortech Competições
2016	Brasileiro de Turismo	Márcio Campos	JL G-12 Stock Car	Motortech Competições
2017	Brasileiro de Turismo	Gabriel Robe	JL G-12 Stock Car	Motortech Competições
2018	Stock Light	Raphael Reis	JL G-12 Stock Car	W2 Racing
2019	Stock Light	Guilherme Salas	JL G-12 Stock Car	KTF Sports
2020	Stock Light	Pietro Rimbano	JL G-12 Stock Car	KTF Sports
2021	Stock Light	Felipe Baptista	JL G-12 Stock Car	KTF Sports
2022	Stock Series	Vitor Baptista	Chevrolet Cruze	W2 ProGP
2023	Stock Series	Zezinho Muggiati	Chevrolet Cruze	W2 ProGP
2024	Stock Series	Arthur Gama	Chevrolet Cruze	Artcon Racing
2025	Stock Light	Felipe Barrichello Bartz	Chevrolet Cruze	SG28 Racing

Note – 1993–1999, Stock Car Brasil B. The series competed in same races of Stock Car Brasil.
Note – 2000–2007, Stock Car Light Brasil. Changes the name and become has compete separately from Stock Car Brasil.
Note – 2008–2009, Copa Vicar. Changed his name due organizers' reasons. Note – 2018–2021, Stock Light Brasil.

=

== Fatal accidents ==
- On 9 December 2007, Rafael Sperafico, of the Sperafico racing family, died during the final race of the Stock Car Light 2007 season at Interlagos. His cousins Rodrigo and Ricardo Sperafico race in the top-level series. It was the first fatal accident in the Stock Car Light series.
- On April 3, 2011, Gustavo Sondermann, competing in a Copa Chevrolet Montana race, was killed at Interlagos in an accident almost identical to that of Sperafico, four years earlier.

== See also ==
- Stock Car Brasil
