= 2010 Copa Chevrolet Montana season =

Car racing competition

Seasons
- ← 2009 2011 →

The 2010 Copa Chevrolet season was the first Copa Chevrolet Montana season. The category is the second tier of Stock Car Brasil replaces Copa Vicar. It began on April 11 at Curitiba and ended on December 5 at same circuit after nine rounds.

Driving for Nascar Motorsport, Diogo Pachenki claimed the title after win the last round at Curitiba.

== Teams and drivers ==
- All cars are powered by Chevrolet engines and use Chevrolet Montana chassis. All drivers were Brazilian-registered.

Team	No.	Driver	Rounds
Racequip Motorsport	0	Eduardo Furlanetto	6, 8–9
Racequip Motorsport	23	Marco Cozzi	2–9
Racequip Motorsport	32	Fernando Fortes	5, 7
Racequip Motorsport	83	Sharbel El Hajjar	2–3
Gramacho Costa	1	Cadú Pasetti	All
Gramacho Costa	8	Douglas Soares	All
Nascar Motorsport	2	João Paulo Mauro	All
Nascar Motorsport	6	Diogo Pachenki	All
RC3 Bassani Racing	3	Denis Navarro	All
RC3 Bassani Racing	19	Aldo Piedade Jr.	1–3
AMD Racing	4	Júlio Campos	1–3
AMD Racing	10	Aluizio Coelho	1
AMD Racing	30	Alceu Feldmann	2
Max Power Racing	7	Kau Machado	5–7, 9
Max Power Racing	54	Fabricio Lançoni	1–4
Max Power Racing	63	Marlon Watanabe	5
Max Power Racing	89	Matheus Stumpf	2
Hot Car Competições	9	Eduardo Leite	All
Hot Car Competições	26	Wellington Justino	All
Petropolis Motorsport	11	Pedro Boesel	All
Petropolis Motorsport	43	Cássio Homem de Mello	1–7
Motortech Competições	14	Hybernon Cisne	1–6, 8
Motortech Competições	20	Gustavo Martins	7, 9
CKR Racing	16	Carlos Kray	2–7
CKR Racing	47	Duda Bana	9
CKR Racing	75	Henrique Assunção	All
CKR Racing	78	Fúlvio Marote	8
W2 Racing	17	Serafin Jr.	All
W2 Racing	30	Alceu Feldmann	4
W2 Racing	41	Julyano Silveira	1–2
W2 Racing	77	Felipe Lapenna	3
W2 Racing	90	Thiago Riberi	5–9
M4T Motorsport	18	Rodrigo Navarro	All
M4T Motorsport	33	Nelson Piquet Jr.	1
M4T Motorsport	38	Thiago Penido	2–9
AMG Motorsport	21	Lucas Finger	All
AMG Motorsport	29	Anderson Farias	1–3, 9
Scuderia 111	22	Rafael Daniel	All
Scuderia 111	73	Sérgio Jimenez	1–8
Bazzo Racing	25	Tiago Geronimi	7–9
Bazzo Racing	60	Sérgio Ramalho	1–5, 7–9
Carlos Alves Competições	28	Galid Osman	All
Carlos Alves Competições	98	Marcelo Tomasoni	All
RS Racing	31	Ítalo Silveira	1–5
RS Racing	88	Leandro Romera	1–5
J. Star Racing	46	Edson do Valle	1–6
J. Star Racing	48	Gustavo Sondermann	3–9
J. Star Racing	88	Leandro Romera	7–9
J. Star Racing	90	Thiago Riberi	1–2
Mottin Racing	49	Marcelo Cesquim	All
Mottin Racing	56	João Pretto	All
Roby Competições	51	Franklin Trupel	1
A.Jardim Motorsport	72	Fabio Fogaça	1, 3

== Race calendar and results ==
All rounds of the championship will support the Stock Car Brasil events. All races were held in Brazil.

Round	Circuit	Date	Pole position	Fastest lap	Winning driver	Winning team
1	Autódromo Internacional de Curitiba	April 11	Eduardo Leite	Júlio Campos	Júlio Campos	M4T Motorsport
2	Velopark, Nova Santa Rita	May 2	Ítalo Silveira	Diogo Pachenki	Ítalo Silveira	RS Racing
3	Autódromo Internacional Nelson Piquet	May 23	Eduardo Leite	Eduardo Leite	Eduardo Leite	Hot Car Racing
4	Ribeirão Preto Street Circuit	June 6	Sérgio Jimenez	Galid Osman	Sérgio Jimenez	Scuderia 111
5	Autódromo José Carlos Pace	September 5	Sérgio Jimenez	Galid Osman	Diogo Pachenki	Nascar Motorsport
6	Autódromo Internacional Orlando Moura	September 19	Eduardo Leite	Eduardo Leite	Gustavo Sondermann	J. Star Racing
7	Autódromo Internacional de Santa Cruz do Sul	October 24	Galid Osman	Diogo Pachenki	Douglas Soares	Gramacho Costa
8	Autódromo Internacional Nelson Piquet	November 21	Galid Osman	Galid Osman	Galid Osman	Carlos Alves Competições
9	Autódromo Internacional de Curitiba	December 5	Rafael Daniel	Rafael Daniel	Diogo Pachenki	Nascar Motorsport

== Championship standings ==
- Points were awarded as follows:

Pos	1	2	3	4	5	6	7	8	9	10	11	12	13	14	15
Race	25	20	16	14	12	10	9	8	7	6	5	4	3	2	1

=== Drivers' Championship ===
Pos	Driver	CUR	VEL	RIO	RBP	INT	CAM	SCS	BRA	CUR	Drop	Points
1	Diogo Pachenki	3	2	4	Ret	1	10	14	2	1	2	130
2	Eduardo Leite	Ret	4	1	5	3	3	21	4	20		97
3	Rafael Daniel	4	15	2	2	8	8	2	DSQ	6	9	94
4	Douglas Soares	6	6	11	10	10	5	1	6	13	9	81
5	Wellington Justino	5	Ret	9	7	4	2	5	Ret	22		76
6	Sérgio Jimenez	8	16	10	1	Ret	4	4	11			73
6	Lucas Finger	11	3	5	4	12	Ret	7	5	Ret		73
8	Galid Osman	25	9	6	11	2	12	18	1	Ret		71
9	Serafin Junior	27	5	3	19	DNS	22	Ret	15	2		49
10	Thiago Riberi	Ret	Ret			9	11	8	3	5		48
11	Gustavo Sondermann			Ret	6	Ret	1	Ret	8	Ret		43
12	João Pretto	Ret	20	17	9	21	7	3	12	Ret		36
12	Pedro Boesel	7	Ret	15	Ret	11	6	Ret	7	15		36
14	Marco Cozzi		DNS	7	Ret	15	15	20	9	3		34
15	Sérgio Ramalho	17	10	8	3	Ret		Ret	20	16		30
15	Cássio Homem de Mello	9	Ret	13	Ret	7	9	13				30
17	Ítalo Silveira	26	1	12	DNS	24						29
17	Denis Navarro	14	21	Ret	12	14	13	6	Ret	9		29
17	Marcelo Tomasoni	15	8	26	17	6	20	19	21	7		29
20	Júlio Campos	1	Ret	Ret								25
20	João Paulo Mauro	20	Ret	19	Ret	23	DSQ	11	10	4		25
22	Cadú Pasetti	10	7	25	Ret	25	Ret	9	18	17		23
23	Leandro Romera	12	DNS	18	8	20		Ret	13	12		20
24	Rodrigo Navarro	16	19	Ret	13	5	24	Ret	14	18		18
25	Thiago Penido		13	Ret	15	16	19	DSQ	Ret	8		12
26	Gustavo Martins							10		14		8
27	Duda Bana									10		6
27	Marcelo Cesquim	28	Ret	23	14	Ret	18	12	Ret	Ret		6
29	Eduardo Furlanetto						16		Ret	11		5
29	Anderson Faria	23	11	Ret						19		5
29	Hybernon Cisne	Ret	DNS	Ret	Ret	13	14		17			5
32	Carlos Kray		12	24	16	Ret	25	24				4
32	Julyano Silveira	13	Ret									4
34	Henrique Assunção	21	14	Ret	DNS	18	21	15	Ret	Ret		3
35	Felipe Lapenna			14								2
36	Tiago Geronimi							16	16	21		0
36	Fábio Fogaça	24		16								0
36	Edson do Valle	Ret	22	20	18	19	17					0
36	Kau Machado					Ret	23	17		DSQ		0
36	Fernando Fortes					17		Ret				0
36	Alceu Feldmann		17		DNS							0
36	Aldo Piedade Jr.	Ret	18	21								0
36	Aluizio Coelho	18										0
36	Fabricio Lançoni	19	Ret	DNS	20							0
36	Fúlvio Marote								19			0
36	Franklin Trupel	22										0
36	Sharbel El Hajjar		Ret	Ret								0
36	Matheus Stumpf		Ret									0
36	Marlon Watanabe					Ret						0
Drivers ineligible for championship
	Nelson Piquet Jr.	2										0
Pos	Driver	CUR	VEL	RIO	RBP	INT	CAM	SCS	BRA	CUR	Drop	Points

Colour	Result
Gold	Winner
Silver	Second place
Bronze	Third place
Green	Points classification
Blue	Non-points classification
Blue	Non-classified finish (NC)
Purple	Retired, not classified (Ret)
Red	Did not qualify (DNQ)
Red	Did not pre-qualify (DNPQ)
Black	Disqualified (DSQ)
White	Did not start (DNS)
White	Withdrew (WD)
White	Race cancelled (C)
Blank	Did not practice (DNP)
Blank	Did not arrive (DNA)
Blank	Excluded (EX)
