= 2011 Copa Chevrolet Montana season =

Car racing competition

Seasons
- ← 2010 2012 →

The 2011 Copa Chevrolet Montana season will be the second Copa Chevrolet Montana season. It began on April 3 at the Interlagos and finished on November 6 at Velopark, after nine rounds.

Gramacho Racing Rafael Daniel claimed the title after finished 2nd in the final round of the season, two places ahed of Leandro Romera, who was beaten to the title by 8.5 points. Reigning Champion Diogo Pachenki finished third.

The season was marred by the death of Gustavo Sondermann in first race at Interlagos.

== Teams and drivers ==
- All cars are powered by Chevrolet engines and use Chevrolet Montana chassis. All drivers were Brazilian-registered.

Team	No.	Driver	Rounds
Racequip Motorsport	0	Eduardo Furlanetto	6–7
Racequip Motorsport	23	Marco Cozzi	1–7, 9
Racequip Motorsport	32	Fernando Fortes	1–5
Racequip Motorsport	36	Rodrigo Barone	8
Racequip Motorsport	57	Felipe Tozzo	9
Nascar Motorsport	5	Sergio Ramalho	All
Nascar Motorsport	6	Diogo Pachenki	All
Gramacho Racing	7	Rodrigo Pimenta	2–9
Gramacho Racing	8	Douglas Soares	1
Gramacho Racing	22	Rafael Daniel	All
Petropolis Motorsport	9	Felipe Lapenna	7
Petropolis Motorsport	70	Marcelo Franco	4
Petropolis Motorsport	77	Beto Cavaleiro	All
Petropolis Motorsport	97	Fabio Viscardi	1–3, 5–6
W2 Racing	11	Pedro Boesel	All
W2 Racing	17	Serafin Jr.	7–8
W2 Racing	55	Paulo Salustiano	6
W2 Racing	90	Thiago Riberi	1–5
Bassan Motorsport	15	Claudio Cantelli	2–4
Bassan Motorsport	82	William Freire	5
CKR Racing	16	Carlos Kray	1–7, 9
CKR Racing	32	Fernando Fortes	6–9
CKR Racing	56	João Pretto	1–5
CKR Racing	75	Matheus Castro	8
Motortech Competições	20	Jorge Garcia	1, 4–9
Motortech Competições	34	Tito Morestoni	3–5, 7, 9
Motortech Competições	46	Wilson Junior	2, 6, 8
Motortech Competições	47	Duda Bana	1–3
Hot Car Racing	25	Tiago Geronimi	All
Hot Car Racing	26	Wellington Justino	All
Mottin Racing	27	Christian Castro	All
Mottin Racing	49	Marcelo Cesquim	All
Carlos Alves Competições	28	Galid Osman	All
Carlos Alves Competições	98	Marcelo Tomasoni	All
Bazzo Racing	31	ìtalo Silveira	2–9
Bazzo Racing	34	Tito Morestoni	1
Bazzo Racing	56	João Pretto	6–9
J Star Racing	38	Thiago Penido	All
J Star Racing	44	Norberto Gresse	2–9
J Star Racing	48	Gustavo Sondermann	1
AMG Motorsport	88	Leandro Romera	All

== Race calendar and results ==
All rounds of the championship will support the Stock Car Brasil events. All races were held in Brazil.

Round	Circuit	Date	Pole position	Fastest lap	Winning driver	Winning team
1	Autódromo José Carlos Pace	April 4	Rafael Daniel	Rafael Daniel	Rafael Daniel	Gramacho Racing
2	Velopark, Nova Santa Rita	May 15	Rafael Daniel	Leandro Romera	Diogo Pachenki	NASCAR Motorsport
3	Autódromo Internacional Orlando Moura	June 6	Galid Osman	Diogo Pachenki	Rafael Daniel	Gramacho Racing
4	Autódromo Internacional Nelson Piquet	July 3	Galid Osman	Leandro Romera	Leandro Romera	AMG Motorsport
5	Autódromo José Carlos Pace	August 8	Galid Osman	Marco Cozzi	Galid Osman	Carlos Alves Competições
6	Autódromo Internacional de Santa Cruz do Sul	September 18	Rafael Daniel	Galid Osman	Rafael Daniel	Gramacho Racing
7	Autódromo Internacional Ayrton Senna	October 2	Diogo Pachenki	Rafael Daniel	Diogo Pachenki	NASCAR Motorsport
8	Autódromo Internacional Nelson Piquet	October 16	Galid Osman	Rafael Daniel	Rafael Daniel	Gramacho Racing
9	Velopark, Nova Santa Rita	November 6	Rafael Daniel	Leandro Romera	Diogo Pachenki	NASCAR Motorsport

== Championship standings ==
- Points were awarded as follows:

Pos	1	2	3	4	5	6	7	8	9	10	11	12	13	14	15
Race	25	20	16	14	12	10	9	8	7	6	5	4	3	2	1

=== Drivers' Championship ===
Pos	Driver	INT	VEL	CAM	RIO	INT	SCS	LON	BRA	VEL	Drop	Points
1	Rafael Daniel	**1**	**3**	1	Ret	17	**1**	4	1	**2**		137.5
2	Leandro Romera	18	2	2	1	7	4	3	2	4	9	129
3	Diogo Pachenki	6	1	7	3	4	7	**1**	DNS	1	5	123
4	Galid Osman	Ret	7	**13**	**2**	**1**	20	2	**7**	3		102
5	Sergio Ramalho	2	6	Ret	6	8	6	8	Ret	8		64
6	Tiago Geronimi	11	8	Ret	14	12	3	7	4	7	2	62.5
7	Marco Cozzi	4	9	9	11	2	15	10		13	1	55
8	Wellington Justino	3	10	18	9	6	2	Ret	Ret	Ret		51
9	Christian Castro	12	4	6	Ret	10	8	17	DSQ	6		50
10	Norberto Gresse		17	5	4	9	Ret	Ret	3	17		49
11	Rodrigo Pimenta		Ret	14	10	3	5	5	Ret	Ret		48
12	Thiago Riberi	9	5	4	7	11						43.5
13	Fernando Fortes	7	19	Ret	8	Ret	10	9	6	12		39.5
14	Marcelo Tomasoni	Ret	16	8	5	Ret	9	12	Ret	9		38
15	Pedro Boesel	Ret	11	3	Ret	14	Ret	6	Ret	15		34
16	Marcelo Cesquim	Ret	Ret	10	12	15	11	11	5	16		33
17	João Pretto	Ret	Ret	17	Ret	5	12	Ret	Ret	Ret		16
18	ìtalo Silveira		20	19	13	16	21	Ret	DSQ	5		15
18	Thiago Penido	14	12	11	Ret	19	13	14	Ret	Ret		15
20	Tito Morestoni	10		16	Ret	22		13		10		12
21	Rodrigo Barone								8			8
21	Jorge Garcia	16			18	21	18	16	10	14		8
23	Serafin Jr.							Ret	9			7
24	Douglas Soares	5										6
24	Duda Bana	8	14	Ret								6
24	Beto Cavaleiro	17	15	Ret	16	18	17	Ret	11	Ret		6
27	Claudio Cantelli		18	12	15							5
28	Fabio Viscardi	13	Ret	15		Ret	14					4.5
28	Carlos Kray	15	13	Ret	17	20	16	15		Ret		4.5
30	William Freire					13						3
31	Eduardo Furlanetto						19	DSQ				0
31	Marcelo Franco				19							0
31	Wilson Junior		Ret				Ret		Ret			0
31	Paulo Salustiano						Ret					0
Drivers ineligible for championship
	Felipe Tozzo									11		0
	Felipe Lapenna							18				0
	Gustavo Sondermann	Ret†										0
	Matheus Castro								Ret			0
Pos	Driver	INT	VEL	CAM	RIO	INT	SCS	LON	BRA	VEL	Drop	Points

Colour	Result
Gold	Winner
Silver	Second place
Bronze	Third place
Green	Points classification
Blue	Non-points classification
Blue	Non-classified finish (NC)
Purple	Retired, not classified (Ret)
Red	Did not qualify (DNQ)
Red	Did not pre-qualify (DNPQ)
Black	Disqualified (DSQ)
White	Did not start (DNS)
White	Withdrew (WD)
White	Race cancelled (C)
Blank	Did not practice (DNP)
Blank	Did not arrive (DNA)
Blank	Excluded (EX)

**Bold** – Pole
Italics – Fastest Lap

Notes

† Gustavo Sondermann had a fatal accident in Interlagos; the race was halted and half points awarded.

=== Teams' Championship ===
Pos	Team	INT	VEL	CAM	RIO	INT	SCS	LON	BRA	VEL	Points
1	Nascar Motorsport	2	1	7	3	4	6	1	Ret	1	192
1	Nascar Motorsport	6	6	Ret	6	8	7	8	DNS	8	192
2	Gramacho Racing	1	3	1	10	3	1	4	1	2	191.5
2	Gramacho Racing	5	Ret	14	Ret	17	5	5	Ret	Ret	191.5
3	Carlos Alves Competições	Ret	7	8	2	1	9	2	7	3	140
3	Carlos Alves Competições	Ret	16	13	5	Ret	20	12	Ret	9	140
4	AMG Motorsport	18	2	2	1	7	4	3	2	4	138
5	Hot Car Racing	3	8	18	8	6	2	7	4	7	115.5
5	Hot Car Racing	11	10	Ret	14	12	3	Ret	Ret	Ret	115.5
6	W2 Racing	9	5	3	7	11	Ret	6	9	15	84.5
6	W2 Racing	Ret	11	4	Ret	14	Ret	Ret	Ret		84.5
7	Mottin Racing	12	4	6	12	10	8	11	5	6	83
7	Mottin Racing	Ret	Ret	10	Ret	15	11	17	DSQ	16	83
8	Racequip Motorsport	4	9	9	8	2	15	10	8	11	81.5
8	Racequip Motorsport	7	19	Ret	11	Ret	19	DSQ		13	81.5
9	J Star Racing	14	12	5	4	9	13	14	3	17	64
9	J Star Racing	Ret	17	11	Ret	19	Ret	Ret	Ret	Ret	64
10	CKR Racing	15	13	Ret	17	5	10	9	6	12	43.5
10	CKR Racing	Ret	Ret	Ret	Ret	20	16	15	Ret	Ret	43.5
11	Motortech Competições	8	14	16	18	21	18	13	10	10	23
11	Motortech Competições	16	Ret	Ret	Ret	22	Ret	16	Ret	14	23
12	Bazzo Racing	10	20	19	16	13	12	Ret	Ret	5	22
12	Bazzo Racing						21	Ret	DSQ	Ret	22
13	Petrópolis Motorsport	13	15	15	16	18	14	18	11	Ret	10.5
13	Petrópolis Motorsport	17	Ret	Ret	19	Ret	17	Ret			10.5
14	Bassan Motorsport		18	12	15	13					8
Pos	Team	INT	VEL	CAM	RIO	INT	SCS	LON	BRA	VEL	Points

Colour	Result
Gold	Winner
Silver	Second place
Bronze	Third place
Green	Points classification
Blue	Non-points classification
Blue	Non-classified finish (NC)
Purple	Retired, not classified (Ret)
Red	Did not qualify (DNQ)
Red	Did not pre-qualify (DNPQ)
Black	Disqualified (DSQ)
White	Did not start (DNS)
White	Withdrew (WD)
White	Race cancelled (C)
Blank	Did not practice (DNP)
Blank	Did not arrive (DNA)
Blank	Excluded (EX)
