= 2010 GT Brasil season =

2010 GT Brasil

Seasons
- ← 2009 2011 →

The 2010 Itaipava GT Brasil season was the fourth Campeonato Sudamericano de GT season. In 2010 the category changes its name replacing GT3 Brasil Championship and the first with GT3 and GT4 class. It began on 21 March at Autódromo José Carlos Pace and ended on 28 November at the same venue after eight rounds.

Matheus Stumpf and Valdeno Brito clinched a comfortable championship victory in the GT3 class, winning the championship by 64 points over their closest competitors. Stumpf and Brito won five races during the season including sweeping the weekend at the second Interlagos meeting and at Velopark, as well as a victory at the second meeting to be held in Curitiba. The pairing also took nine further top-five finishes, and retiring from the other two races to be held. Second place went to Marcelo Hahn and Allam Khodair, who despite not winning any of the races, they managed to finish two points clear of Chico Longo and Daniel Serra, who won at the first Curitiba meeting and the third Interlagos meeting. Claúdio Ricci finished in fourth place, winning two races at the same meetings as Longo and Serra. Other wins were taken by Andreas Mattheis and Xandy Negrão, who swept the races at Rio de Janeiro, Claudio Dahruj and Rafael Daniel swept the first Interlagos meeting, while Wagner Ebrahim won three of the last four races driving solo in his66666 Viper Competition Coupe.

Valter Rossete won the GT4 championship, taking two wins at Interlagos 2 and Rio de Janeiro as well as twelve other top-five finishes as he finished six points clear of Renan Guerra. Guerra took six victories as a solo driver, but two retirements during the season thwarted the chances of a championship title. Third place went to Fabio Greco, who shared his car with Rossete at all races except the opening round. Three-time race winner Cristiano Federico – sharing his car with Leonardo Medrado for two victories, and Guto Negrão for one – finished in fourth place, ahead of Alan Hellmeister and Sergio Laganá, who won at Interlagos 1 and Velopark. Other victories were claimed by Marçal Mello and William Freire in Rio de Janeiro, and Carlos Burza and Leonardo Burti swept the second Curitiba weekend.

== Entries ==
GT3 suffered no initial changes only the entry of more Lamborghini Gallardo LP560 who had participated in the last round of 2009, throughout the season came the Audi R8 LMS

With the debut of GT4 category was initially composed of only Maserati Trofeo, the course of the season reached the championship models Ferrari Challenge and Ginetta G50.

== Entry list ==
All drivers were Brazilian-registered.

2010 Entry List
Team	No.	Drivers	Class	Chassis	Rounds
WB Motorsport	2	Júlio Campos	GT3	Porsche 997 GT3 Cup	1
WB Motorsport	2	Beto Monteiro	GT3	Porsche 997 GT3 Cup	1
WB Motorsport	4	Norberto Gresse	GT3	Porsche 997 GT3 Cup	1
WB Motorsport	4	Roberto Posses	GT3	Porsche 997 GT3 Cup	1
WB Motorsport	12	Josué Pimenta	GT3	Porsche 997 GT3 Cup	8
WB Motorsport	12	Pipo Derani	GT3	Porsche 997 GT3 Cup	8
CRT Brasil	3	Rafael Derani	GT3	Ferrari F430 GT3	1–5, 7–8
CRT Brasil	3	Cláudio Ricci	GT3	Ferrari F430 GT3	All
CRT Brasil	3	Aluizio Coelho	GT3	Ferrari F430 GT3	6
CRT Brasil	70	Walter Derani	GT3	Ferrari F430 GT3	All
CRT Brasil	70	Antônio Pizzonia	GT3	Ferrari F430 GT3	1–6, 8
CRT Brasil	70	Aluizio Coelho	GT3	Ferrari F430 GT3	7
AH Competições	5	Leonardo Burti	GT3	Ford GT GT3	1
AH Competições	5	Lico Kaesemodel	GT3	Ford GT GT3	1–5
AH Competições	5	Aluizio Coelho	GT3	Ford GT GT3	2–4
AH Competições	5	Paulo Bonifacio	GT3	Ford GT GT3	5–8
AH Competições	5	Juliano Moro	GT3	Ford GT GT3	6–8
AH Competições	7	Matheus Stumpf	GT3	Ford GT GT3	All
AH Competições	7	Valdeno Brito	GT3	Ford GT GT3	All
Scuderia 111	8	Claudio Dahruj	GT3	Lamborghini Gallardo LP560 GT3	1–7
Scuderia 111	8	Rafael Daniel	GT3	Lamborghini Gallardo LP560 GT3	1–4
Scuderia 111	8	Ricardo Zonta	GT3	Lamborghini Gallardo LP560 GT3	5–7
Scuderia 111	8	Fernando Poeta	GT3	Lamborghini Gallardo LP560 GT3	8
Scuderia 111	8	Sergio Lucio	GT3	Lamborghini Gallardo LP560 GT3	8
Scuderia 111	33	Bruno Garfinkel	GT3	Lamborghini Gallardo LP560 GT3	All
Scuderia 111	33	Ricardo Maurício	GT3	Lamborghini Gallardo LP560 GT3	All
Scuderia 111	36	Guilherme Figueroa	GT3	Lamborghini Gallardo GT3	7
Scuderia 111	36	Sérgio Jimenez	GT3	Lamborghini Gallardo GT3	7
Scuderia 111	99	Gustavo Sondermann	GT4	Maserati Trofeo	2–8
Scuderia 111	99	Ricardo Ricca	GT4	Maserati Trofeo	2–8
A.Mattheis	9	Andreas Mattheis	GT3	Ford GT; Audi R8 LMS	1–2, 4–8
A.Mattheis	9	Xandy Negrão	GT3	Ford GT; Audi R8 LMS	1, 4–8
A.Mattheis	9	Xandinho Negrão	GT3	Ford GT; Audi R8 LMS	2
TNT Energy Team	13	Pedro Queirolo	GT3	Dodge Viper Competition Coupe	All
TNT Energy Team	17	Marcello Sant'Anna	GT3	Dodge Viper Competition Coupe	1–3
TNT Energy Team	17	Leonardo Vital	GT3	Dodge Viper Competition Coupe	1–3
Metasa	14	Felipe Roso	GT4	Maserati Trofeo	6
Metasa	14	Vinicius Roso	GT4	Maserati Trofeo	6
Old Boys	15	Eduardo Ramos	GT3	Ford GT GT3	1
Old Boys	15	Leandro Almeida	GT3	Ford GT GT3	1
Blau Full Time Lamborghini	16	Marcelo Hahn	GT3	Lamborghini Gallardo LP560 GT3	All
Blau Full Time Lamborghini	16	Allam Khodair	GT3	Lamborghini Gallardo LP560 GT3	All
Blau Full Time Lamborghini	69	Thiago Viana	GT3	Lamborghini Gallardo LP560 GT3	2–3
Blau Full Time Lamborghini	69	Marcos Gomes	GT3	Lamborghini Gallardo LP560 GT3	2–3
TNT Vivo Greco	17	Marcello Sant'anna	GT4	Ferrari Challenge	4–8
TNT Vivo Greco	21	Valter Rossete	GT4	Maserati Trofeo; Ferrari Challenge	All
TNT Vivo Greco	21	Fabio Greco	GT4	Maserati Trofeo; Ferrari Challenge	2–8
Sul Racing	18	Fernando Poeta	GT3	Ferrari F430 GT3	1–2, 4, 6–7
Sul Racing	18	Fábio Carreira	GT3	Ferrari F430 GT3	1
Sul Racing	18	Sérgio Lúcio	GT3	Ferrari F430 GT3	2
Sul Racing	18	João Santanna	GT3	Ferrari F430 GT3	4, 6
Lamborghini Cimed	19	Chico Longo	GT3	Lamborghini Gallardo LP560 GT3	All
Lamborghini Cimed	19	Daniel Serra	GT3	Lamborghini Gallardo LP560 GT3	All
Lamborghini Cimed	77	Chico Serra	GT3	Lamborghini Gallardo LP560	All
Lamborghini Cimed	77	João Adibe	GT3	Lamborghini Gallardo LP560	1–6, 8
Lamborghini Cimed	77	Alexandre Conill	GT3	Lamborghini Gallardo LP560	7
Ebrahim Motors	20	Wagner Ebrahim	GT3	Dodge Viper Competition Coupe	7–8
Della Via Racing	27	Fabio Delamuta	GT4	Maserati Trofeo	6–8
Della Via Racing	27	Roberto Santos	GT4	Maserati Trofeo	6–8
Itaipava Racing Team	30	Cleber Faria	GT3	Lamborghini Gallardo LP560 GT3	1-7
Itaipava Racing Team	105	Vanuê Faria	GT3	Lamborghini Gallardo LP560 GT3	All
Itaipava Racing Team	105	Cleber Faria	GT3	Lamborghini Gallardo LP560 GT3	8
M2 Competições 2	37	Roberto Laganá	GT4	Maserati Trofeo	1
Coruja Competições	44	Roberto Amaral	GT4	Maserati Trofeo	3, 5
Coruja Competições	44	Mauricio Olio	GT4	Maserati Trofeo	3
Coruja Competições	44	Roberta Amaral	GT4	Maserati Trofeo	5
Itaipava CRT	51	Otávio Mesquita	GT4	Ferrari Challenge	2, 4–8
Crystal Racing Team	55	Renan Guerra	GT4	Maserati Trofeo	All
Crystal Racing Team	75	Henrique Assunção	GT4	Maserati Trofeo	All
Crystal Racing Team	75	Carlos Kray	GT4	Maserati Trofeo	1–2, 4–8
Crystal Racing Team	75	Fulvio Marote	GT4	Maserati Trofeo	7
M2 Competições	57	Sergio Laganá	GT4	Maserati Trofeo; Ferrari Challenge	All
M2 Competições	57	Alan Hellmeister	GT4	Maserati Trofeo; Ferrari Challenge	All
ATW Racing Team	72	Cristiano Federico	GT4	Maserati Trofeo; Ferrari Challenge	All
ATW Racing Team	72	Leonardo Medrado	GT4	Maserati Trofeo; Ferrari Challenge	1–7
ATW Racing Team	72	Guto Negrão	GT4	Maserati Trofeo; Ferrari Challenge	8
ATW Racing Team 2	73	Oswaldo Federico	GT4	Maserati Trofeo	3–6, 8
ATW Racing Team 2	73	Rodrigo Navarro	GT4	Maserati Trofeo	3–6
ATW Racing Team 2	73	Caio Lara	GT4	Maserati Trofeo	8
ATW Racing Team 2	121	João Marcelo	GT4	Maserati Trofeo	3–6
ATW Racing Team 2	121	Rodrigo Stefanini	GT4	Maserati Trofeo	3
ATW Racing Team 2	121	Eduardo Furlanetto	GT4	Maserati Trofeo	4–6
Blau Full Time Ferrari	80	Thiago Viana	GT3	Ferrari F430 GT3	1
Blau Full Time Ferrari	80	Marcos Gomes	GT3	Ferrari F430 GT3	1
Blau Full Time Ferrari	100	Linneu Linardi	GT3	Ferrari F430 GT3	2–8
Blau Full Time Ferrari	100	Júlio Campos	GT3	Ferrari F430 GT3	2–4
Blau Full Time Ferrari	100	Marcos Gomes	GT3	Ferrari F430 GT3	5–8
Manelão Competições	81	Carlos Burza	GT4	Maserati Trofeo; Ginetta G50	All
Manelão Competições	81	André Posses	GT4	Maserati Trofeo; Ginetta G50	1
Manelão Competições	81	Leonardo Burti	GT4	Maserati Trofeo; Ginetta G50	5–8
Manelão Competições	82	Marçal Mello	GT4	Maserati Trofeo; Ginetta G50	All
Manelão Competições	82	William Freire	GT4	Maserati Trofeo; Ginetta G50	All
Manelão Competições	83	Adriano Griecco	GT4	Maserati Trofeo	1
Manelão Competições	83	Samuel Melo	GT4	Maserati Trofeo	1
Manelão Competições II	88	Caito Vianna	GT4	Maserati Trofeo	8
Manelão Competições II	88	Eduardo Furlanetto	GT4	Maserati Trofeo	8
Manelão Competições II	157	Rodrigo Barone	GT4	Maserati Trofeo	5
Manelão Competições II	157	Caito Vianna	GT4	Maserati Trofeo	5
MJR Racing	113	Mauricio Silva Jr.	GT4	Maserati Trofeo	8

Icon	Class
GT3	GT3 Class
GT4	GT4 Class

== Race calendar and results ==
All races were held in Brazil.

Round		Circuit	Date	GT3 Winner	GT4 Winner
1	R1	Interlagos	20 March	No. 8 Scuderia 111	No. 55 Crystal Racing Team
1	R1	Interlagos	20 March	Claudio Dahruj Rafael Daniel	Renan Guerra
1	R2	Interlagos	21 March	No. 8 Scuderia 111	No. 57 M2 Competições
1	R2	Interlagos	21 March	Claudio Dahruj Rafael Daniel	Sergio Laganá Alan Hellmeister
2	R1	Curitiba	25 April^{†}	No. 3 CRT Brasil	No. 55 Crystal Racing Team
2	R1	Curitiba	25 April^{†}	Rafael Derani Cláudio Ricci	Renan Guerra
2	R2	Curitiba	25 April^{†}	No. 19 Lamborghini Cimed	No. 55 Crystal Racing Team
2	R2	Curitiba	25 April^{†}	Chico Longo Daniel Serra	Renan Guerra
3	R1	Interlagos	15 May	No. 7 AH Competições	No. 21 TNT Vivo Greco
3	R1	Interlagos	15 May	Mateus Stumpf Valdeno Brito	Fabio Greco Valter Rossete
3	R2	Interlagos	16 May	No. 7 AH Competições	No. 72 ATW Racing Team
3	R2	Interlagos	16 May	Mateus Stumpf Valdeno Brito	Cristiano Frederico Leonardo Medrado
4	R1	Jacarepaguá	17 July	No. 9 A.Mattheis	No. 82 Manelão Competições
4	R1	Jacarepaguá	17 July	Andreas Mattheis Xandy Negrão	Wiliam Freire Marçal Mello
4	R2	Jacarepaguá	18 July	No. 9 A.Mattheis	No. 21 TNT Vivo Greco
4	R2	Jacarepaguá	18 July	Andreas Mattheis Xandy Negrão	Fabio Greco Valter Rossete
5	R1	Interlagos	7 August	No. 19 Lamborghini Cimed	No. 72 ATW Racing Team
5	R1	Interlagos	7 August	Chico Longo Daniel Serra	Cristiano Frederico Leonardo Medrado
5	R2	Interlagos	8 August	No. 3 CRT Brasil	No. 55 Crystal Racing Team
5	R2	Interlagos	8 August	Rafael Derani Cláudio Ricci	Renan Guerra
6	R1	Velopark	11 September^{†}	No. 7 AH Competições	No. 57 M2 Competições
6	R1	Velopark	11 September^{†}	Mateus Stumpf Valdeno Brito	Sergio Laganá Alan Hellmeister
6	R2	Velopark	11 September^{†}	No. 7 AH Competições	No. 55 Crystal Racing Team
6	R2	Velopark	11 September^{†}	Mateus Stumpf Valdeno Brito	Renan Guerra
7	R1	Curitiba	30 October	No. 20 Ebrahim Motors	No. 81 Manelão Competições
7	R1	Curitiba	30 October	Wagner Ebrahim	Carlos Burza Leonardo Burti
7	R2	Curitiba	31 October	No. 7 AH Competições	No. 81 Manelão Competições
7	R2	Curitiba	31 October	Mateus Stumpf Valdeno Brito	Carlos Burza Leonardo Burti
8	R1	Interlagos	27 November	No. 20 Ebrahim Motors	No. 55 Crystal Racing Team
8	R1	Interlagos	27 November	Wagner Ebrahim	Renan Guerra
8	R2	Interlagos	28 November	No. 20 Ebrahim Motors	No. 72 ATW Racing Team
8	R2	Interlagos	28 November	Wagner Ebrahim	Cristiano Federico Guto Negrão

^{†} − The first race at Curitiba was originally scheduled for April 24 but was postponed to the next day due to heavy rain. The race at Velopark as originally scheduled for September 10 was also postponed to the next day due to same reason.

== Championship standings ==
- Points were awarded as follows:

Pos	1	2	3	4	5	6	7	8	9	10	11	12	13	14	15
Race	20	17	15	13	11	10	9	8	7	6	5	4	3	2	1

=== Drivers' championships ===
==== GT3 ====
Pos	Driver	INT		CUR		INT		RIO		INT		VEL		CUR		INT		Pts
1	Matheus Stumpf	2	3	5	4	1	1	2	Ret	3	**3**	1	**1**	**2**	1	4	Ret	233
1	Valdeno Brito	2	3	5	4	1	1	2	Ret	3	**3**	1	**1**	**2**	1	4	Ret	233
2	Marcelo Hahn	20	2	2	Ret	12	2	5	2	2	9	6	2	5	6	7	6	169
2	Allam Khodair	20	2	2	Ret	12	2	5	2	2	9	6	2	5	6	7	6	169
3	Chico Longo	Ret	7	**Ret**	1	**8**	5	12	3	**1**	2	2	3	7	5	Ret	7	167
3	Daniel Serra	Ret	7	**Ret**	1	**8**	5	12	3	**1**	2	2	3	7	5	Ret	7	167
4	Cláudio Ricci	Ret	10	1	12	2	**Ret**	8	Ret	4	1	DNS	DNS	3	14	2	2	140
5	Rafael Derani	Ret	10	1	12	2	**Ret**	8	Ret	4	1			3	14	2	2	138
5	Andreas Mattheis	7	4	DNS	**DNS**			1	1	5	8	3	8	Ret	17	3	3	138
7	Claudio Dahruj	**1**	1	3	4	6	18	4	9	8	10	DSQ	6	13	11			130
8	Xandy Negrão	7	4					1	1	5	8	3	8	Ret	17	3	3	129
9	Chico Serra	4	8	7	Ret	10	Ret	**6**	4	7	5	4	7	8	7	6	8	128
10	Bruno Garfinkel	3	**Ret**	6	2	3	Ret	3	5	10	7	8	12	DSQ	DSQ	11	9	118
10	Ricardo Maurício	3	**Ret**	6	2	3	Ret	3	5	10	7	8	12	DSQ	DSQ	11	9	118
11	João Adibe	4	8	7	Ret	10	Ret	**6**	4	7	5	4	7			6	8	111
12	Walter Derani	10	13	9	8	9	Ret	Ret	6	Ret	6	**5**	10	12	8	**5**	5	102
13	Rafael Daniel	**1**	1	3	4	6	18	4	9									98
14	Pedro Queirolo	11	9	3	6	14	16	Ret	8	Ret	Ret	Ret	9	4	2	Ret	22	97
15	Cleber Faria	Ret	10	8	Ret	11	Ret	9	**12**	9	4	Ret	4	9	3	10	13	95
16	Antônio Pizzonia	10	13	9	8	9	Ret	Ret	6	Ret	6	**5**	10			**5**	5	90
17	Lico Kaesemodel	Ret	5	10	5	4	3	7	7	6	Ret							84
18	Linneu Linardi			11	9	7	4	24	10	DNS	DNS	7	5	10	4	Ret	24	81
19	Vanuê Faria	13	18	14	7	13	6	13	11	11	14	9	11	11	10	10	23	79
20	Aluizio Coelho			10	5	4	3	7	7			DNS	DNS	12	8			69
21	Júlio Campos	5	6	11	9	7	4	24	10									61
22	Wagner Ebrahim													1	**Ret**	1	**1**	60
23	Paulo Bonifacio									6	Ret	22	13	6	9	8	4	56
24	Juliano Moro											22	13	6	9	8	4	43
25	Marcos Gomes	6	12	Ret	Ret	5	17			DNS	DNS	7	5	10	4	Ret	24	41
26	Thiago Viana	6	12	Ret	Ret	5	17											33
27	Fernando Poeta	12	15	Ret	Ret			17	16			10	14	19	19	12	11	32
28	Ricardo Zonta									8	10	DSQ	6	13	11			29
29	Beto Monteiro	5	6															11
29	Leonardo Burti	Ret	5															11
31	João Santanna							17	16			10	14					10
32	Alexandre Conill													8	7			9
33	Eduardo Ramos	8	14															8
33	Leandro Almeida	8	14															8
34	Norberto Gresse	9	Ret															7
34	Roberto Posses	9	Ret															7
35	Josué Pimenta															10	10	6
35	Pipo Derani															10	10	6
36	Sergio Lucio			Ret	Ret											12	11	5
37	Fabio Carreira	12	15															4
38	Leonardo Vital	Ret	Ret	19	Ret	Ret	Ret											3
38	Marcello Sant'Anna	Ret	Ret	19	Ret	Ret	Ret											3
	Xandinho Negrão			DNS	**DNS**													0
	Guilherme Figueiroa													DNS	DNS			0
	Sérgio Jimenez													DNS	DNS			0
Pos	Driver	INT		CUR		INT		RIO		INT		VEL		CUR		INT		Pts

Colour	Result
Gold	Winner
Silver	Second place
Bronze	Third place
Green	Points classification
Blue	Non-points classification
Blue	Non-classified finish (NC)
Purple	Retired, not classified (Ret)
Red	Did not qualify (DNQ)
Red	Did not pre-qualify (DNPQ)
Black	Disqualified (DSQ)
White	Did not start (DNS)
White	Withdrew (WD)
White	Race cancelled (C)
Blank	Did not practice (DNP)
Blank	Did not arrive (DNA)
Blank	Excluded (EX)

**Bold** – Pole
Italics – Fastest Lap

Notes

The top five after the race ensures a place on the podium.

==== GT4 ====
Pos	Driver	INT		CUR		INT		RDJ		INT		VEL		CUR		INT		Pts
1	Valter Rossete	18	17	17	13	15	15	14	13	13	12	12	17	15	15	14	20	222
2	Renan Guerra	**14**	**19**	**12**	**10**	22	Ret	22	14	14	**11**	16	**14**	Ret	18	13	14	216
3	Fabio Greco			17	13	15	15	14	13	13	12	12	17	15	15	14	20	194
4	Cristiano Federico	16	20	15	15	16	**7**	18	**15**	12	13	Ret	Ret	Ret	Ret	19	**12**	170
5	Sergio Laganá	15	16	Ret	Ret	**18**	13	11	Ret	**15**	DSQ	11	19	18	13	**16**	13	167
5	Alan Hellmeister	15	16	Ret	Ret	**18**	13	11	Ret	**15**	DSQ	11	19	18	13	**16**	13	167
6	Marçal Mello	17	Ret	13	12	17	8	**10**	Ret	18	16	21	25	Ret	**DNS**	17	17	150
6	William Freire	17	Ret	13	12	17	8	**10**	Ret	18	16	21	25	Ret	**DNS**	17	17	150
7	Leonardo Medrado	16	20	15	15	16	**7**	18	**15**	12	13	Ret	Ret	Ret	Ret			141
8	Carlos Burza	21	Ret	20	Ret	Ret	11	19	Ret	23	DNS	**20**	15	**14**	12	15	15	133
9	Henrique Assunção	19	21	16	14	23	9	21	17	17	17	17	24	16	Ret	Ret	Ret	132
10	Gustavo Sondermann			18	Ret	19	10	15	22	16	Ret	14	20	DNS	14	Ret	Ret	103
10	Ricardo Ricca			18	Ret	19	10	15	22	16	Ret	14	20	DNS	14	Ret	Ret	103
11	Leonardo Burti									23	DNS	**20**	15	**14**	12	15	15	95
11	Carlos Kray	19	21	16	14			21	17	17	17	17	24			Ret	Ret	95
13	Otávio Mesquita			Ret	Ret			25	19	Ret	15	15	18	Ret	16	22	16	79
14	Marcello Sant'Anna							16	21	19	20	18	22	17	20	21	18	73
15	João Marcelo					20	12	20	18	21	Ret	13	21					61
16	Eduardo Furlanetto							20	18	21	Ret	13	21			18	21	57
17	Oswaldo Federico					Ret	14	23	20	22	19	19	23			20	Ret	57
18	Rodrigo Navarro					Ret	14	23	20	22	19	19	23					45
19	Guto Negrão															19	**12**	20
20	Roberto Amaral					21	Ret			20	18							18
21	Caito Vianna									Ret	DNS					18	21	16
22	Fulvio Marote													16	Ret			15
23	Rodrigo Stefanini					20	12											10
24	Roberta Amaral									20	18							9
24	André Posses	20	Ret															9
24	Mauricio Olio					21	Ret											9
27	Mauricio Silva Jr															23	19	8
27	Caio Lara															20	Ret	8
29	Felipe Roso											Ret	26					4
29	Vinicius Roso											Ret	26					4
	Fabio Delamuta											Ret	Ret	Ret	Ret	Ret	Ret	0
	Roberto Santos											Ret	Ret	Ret	Ret	Ret	Ret	0
	Adriano Griecco	Ret	Ret															0
	Samuel Melo	Ret	Ret															0
	Roberto Laganá	DNS	Ret															0
	Rodrigo Barone									Ret	DNS							0
Pos	Driver	INT		CUR		INT		RDJ		INT		VEL		CUR		INT		Pts

Colour	Result
Gold	Winner
Silver	Second place
Bronze	Third place
Green	Points classification
Blue	Non-points classification
Blue	Non-classified finish (NC)
Purple	Retired, not classified (Ret)
Red	Did not qualify (DNQ)
Red	Did not pre-qualify (DNPQ)
Black	Disqualified (DSQ)
White	Did not start (DNS)
White	Withdrew (WD)
White	Race cancelled (C)
Blank	Did not practice (DNP)
Blank	Did not arrive (DNA)
Blank	Excluded (EX)

**Bold** – Pole
Italics – Fastest Lap

=== Teams' championships ===
==== GT3 ====
Pos	Team	Pts
1	AH Competições	363
2	Lamborghini Cimed	303
3	Scuderia 111	277
4	CRT Brasil	242
5	Blau Full Time Lamborghini	176
6	Itaipava Racing Team	167
7	A.Mattheis	138
8	TNT Energy Team	100
9	Blau Full Time Ferrari	98
10	Ebrahim Motors	60
11	WB Motorsport	40
12	Sul Racing	25
13	Old Boys	10

==== GT4 ====
Pos	Team	Pts
1	Crystal Racing Team	355
2	TNT Vivo Greco	324
3	Manelão Competições	283
4	ATW Racing Team	180
5	M2 Competições	178
6	ATW Racing Team 2	126
7	Scuderia 111	103
8	Itaipava CRT	79
9	Coruja Competições	25
10	Manelão Competições II	16
11	MJR Racing	13
12	Metasa	4
	M2 Competições 2	0
	Della Via Racing	0
