= Campeonato Brasileiro de Marcas e Pilotos =

- Category: Touring cars
- Country: Brazil
- Inaugural season: 1983
- Folded: 2009
- Constructors: Chevrolet, Fiat, Ford and Volkswagen
- Last Drivers' champion: (Paraná (state)) Marco Romanini
- Last Makes' champion: Volkswagen

The Campeonato Brasileiro de Marcas e Pilotos (Brazilian Championship of Brand and Drivers) was a touring car racing based in Brazil. It had two incarnations, the first one between 1983 and 1994, and the second one between 2004 and 2009.

Start in 1983 the Campeonato Brasileiro de Marcas e Pilotos was a strong touring car racing championship, with direct involvement of the manufactures, had its last year of competition in 1994, the champions were Egon Herzfield and Vicente Daudt, who run with the Ford Escort. At the end of 1994 season, the promise was that we would have for the 1995 season imported cars, utilize in some championships as; BTCC or DTM, but this promise was not fulfilled and the championship was declared ended.

After ten years, in 2004 that announced the return of the championship with new rules and cars, organized for Toninho de Souza and Brazilian Confederation of Auto Racing (CBA), the championship not obtained success and was ended in 2009.

In 2011 that announced the return of the championship with Brasileiro de Marcas name and completely reworked.

== Champions ==
=== 1983–1994 ===
Year	Drivers	Car
1983	(Minas Gerais) Antonio da Matta	Fiat 147
1984	(São Paulo (state)) Jayme Figueiredo (São Paulo (state)) Xandy Negrão	Volkswagen Voyage
1985	(São Paulo (state)) Fábio Greco (São Paulo (state)) Lian Duarte	Volkswagen Voyage
1986	(São Paulo (state)) Armando Balbi (São Paulo (state)) Xandy Negrão	Volkswagen Passat
1987	Turbo: (Minas Gerais) Clemente Faria / (Minas Gerais) Vinicius Pimentel; Aspirado: (Minas Gerais) Antonio da Matta / (Santa Catarina (state)) Gunnar Volmer	Volkswagen Passat
1988	(Rio de Janeiro (state)) Andreas Mattheis	Volkswagen Passat
1989	(Minas Gerais) Antonio da Matta (Santa Catarina (state)) Gunnar Volmer	Volkswagen Passat
1990	(Rio de Janeiro (state)) Andreas Mattheis (Rio de Janeiro (state)) Ricardo Cosac	Volkswagen Passat
1991	(São Paulo (state)) Paulo Gomes (São Paulo (state)) Claudio Girotto	Volkswagen Passat Voyage
1992	(Rio de Janeiro (state)) Andreas Mattheis (Rio de Janeiro (state)) Paulo Judice	Ford Escort
1993	(Rio de Janeiro (state)) Andreas Mattheis (Rio de Janeiro (state)) Paulo Judice	Ford Escort
1994	Div. A: (Rio Grande do Sul) Egon Herzfield / (Rio Grande do Sul) Vicente Daudt; Div. B: (Paraná (state)) Marcos Pegoraro / (Paraná (state)) Henrique Zornig	Ford Escort

=== 2004–2009 ===
Year	Driver	Car
2004	(São Paulo (state)) Rodrigo Navarro	Volkswagen Gol
2005	(Rio Grande do Sul) Rafael Iserhard	Chevrolet Corsa
2006	(Paraná (state)) Fabio Ebrahim	Volkswagen Gol
2007	(Paraná (state)) Geraldo Sermann	Volkswagen Gol
2008	Cancelled	
2009	(Paraná (state)) Marco Romanini	Volkswagen Gol
