= 2015 Campeonato Brasileiro de Turismo season =

Car racing competition

The 2015 Bravar Campeonato Brasileiro de Turismo (Brazilian Touring Championship), also known as Stock Car Brasil Light, was the third season of the Campeonato Brasileiro de Turismo, a second-tier series to Stock Car Brasil.

With a fourteenth-place finish in the final race at Interlagos, Márcio Campos clinched the championship title for the Motortech Competições team. Campos was the season's most prolific winner, winning six of the twelve races, including a run of four successive victories in the first half of the season. Despite this, Campos won the championship by only four points ahead of his closest challenger Dennis Dirani (Voxx Racing), who won races at Santa Cruz do Sul and Goiânia. Third place in the championship went to Edson Coelho Júnior from the J. Star Racing team. Three other drivers won races during the season; Marco Cozzi (W2 Racing) won the season-opening race at Goiânia, his team-mate Felipe Guimarães won at Interlagos, while the winner of the Cascavel race was Bravar Motorsport's Danilo Dirani. The trio finished sixth, seventh and eighth in the championship respectively. In the teams' championship, Motortech Competições won the championship by 24 points ahead of Voxx Racing.

== Teams and drivers ==
- All cars were powered by V8 engines and used the JL chassis. All drivers were Brazilian-registered.

Team	No.	Driver	Rounds
R. Sports Racing	2	Mauri Zacarelli	All
R. Sports Racing	3	Tito Morestoni	1–2
R. Sports Racing	11	Pedro Boesel	3–12
R. Sports Racing	52	Victor Amorim	8–12
Motortech Competições	3	Tito Morestoni	4–7
Motortech Competições	31	Márcio Campos	All
Motortech Competições	35	Gabriel Robe	All
C2 Team	7	Beto Cavaleiro	11
C2 Team	17	Pietro Rimbano	12
C2 Team	36	Flávio Matheus	1–7
C2 Team	53	Gustavo Lima	1–5
Nascar Motorsport	9	Felipe Donato	1–9
Nascar Motorsport	18	Peter Junior	1–2
Nascar Motorsport	36	Flávio Matheus	12
Nascar Motorsport	77	Wilson da Costa, Jr.	4–5
Hitech Racing	11	Pedro Boesel	1–2
Hitech Racing	25	Renato Jader David	4–10
Hitech Racing	36	Flávio Matheus	8–10
Hitech Racing	84	Fernando Croce	12
Hitech Racing	120	Marco Túlio Souza	1–3
W2 Racing	23	Marco Cozzi	All
W2 Racing	66	Felipe Guimarães	All
Bravar Motorsport	28	Danilo Dirani	1–10, 12
Bravar Motorsport	38	Duilio Squassoni	12
RKL Competições	33	Antônio Matiazzi	All
RKL Competições	55	Renato Braga	All
RKL Competições	86	Gustavo Frigotto	8–9, 11–12
J. Star Racing	69	Gustavo Myasava	1–10, 12
J. Star Racing	99	Edson Coelho Júnior	All
Voxx Racing	79	Adibe Marques	All
Voxx Racing	128	Dennis Dirani	All
RR Racing	111	Lukas Moraes	4–12

== Race calendar and results ==
All races were held in Brazil.

Round	Circuit	Date	Pole position	Fastest lap	Winning driver	Winning team
1	Autódromo Internacional Ayrton Senna	March 21	Marco Cozzi	Felipe Guimarães	Marco Cozzi	W2 Racing
2	Autódromo Internacional Ayrton Senna	March 22		Márcio Campos	Danilo Dirani	Bravar Motorsport
3	Velopark, Nova Santa Rita	April 26	Dennis Dirani	Marco Cozzi	Márcio Campos	Motortech Competições
4	Autódromo Internacional de Curitiba	May 30	Felipe Guimarães	Felipe Guimarães	Márcio Campos	Motortech Competições
5	Autódromo Internacional de Curitiba	May 31		Felipe Guimarães	Márcio Campos	Motortech Competições
6	Autódromo Internacional de Santa Cruz do Sul	June 27	Márcio Campos	Márcio Campos	Márcio Campos	Motortech Competições
7	Autódromo Internacional de Santa Cruz do Sul	June 28		Dennis Dirani	Dennis Dirani	Voxx Racing
8	Autódromo Internacional Ayrton Senna	August 15	Felipe Guimarães	Marco Cozzi	Márcio Campos	Motortech Competições
9	Autódromo Internacional Ayrton Senna	August 16		Márcio Campos	Dennis Dirani	Voxx Racing
10	Autódromo Internacional de Cascavel	August 30	Danilo Dirani	Marco Cozzi	Danilo Dirani	Bravar Motorsport
11	Autódromo Internacional de Tarumã	November 8	Márcio Campos	Felipe Guimarães	Márcio Campos	Motortech Competições
12	Autódromo José Carlos Pace	December 13	Felipe Guimarães	Edson Coelho Júnior	Felipe Guimarães	W2 Racing

== Championship standings ==
Points system

Points were awarded for each race at an event, to the driver/s of a car that completed at least 75% of the race distance and was running at the completion of the race, up to a maximum of 40 points per event. Double points were awarded at the final race.

Points format	Position															
Points format	1st	2nd	3rd	4th	5th	6th	7th	8th	9th	10th	11th	12th	13th	14th	15th	16th
Races 1–11	20	16	14	13	12	11	10	9	8	7	6	5	4	3	2	1
Final race	40	32	28	26	24	22	20	18	16	14	12	10	8	6	4	2

=== Drivers' Championship ===
Pos	Driver	GOI		VEL	CUR		SCZ		GOI		CAS	TAR	INT	Pts
1	Márcio Campos	2	10	1	1	1	**1**	DSQ	1	2	7	**1**	14	175
2	Dennis Dirani	10	Ret	**3**	2	5	6	1	2	1	3	4	3	171
3	Edson Coelho Júnior	6	4	7	5	10	5	3	9†	9	13	12†	2	136
4	Gabriel Robe	3	3	Ret	Ret	6	2	Ret	8	5	8	2	5	125
5	Pedro Boesel	Ret	7	6	9	7	9	4	5	4	4	6	10	123
6	Marco Cozzi	**1**	2	2	Ret	3	13†	12	DSQ	10	2	3	13	120
7	Felipe Guimarães	Ret	5	4	**Ret**	2	14†	2	**DSQ**	3	14	Ret	**1**	117
8	Danilo Dirani	9	1	5	3	Ret	4	Ret	Ret	Ret	**1**		4	113
9	Adibe Marques	11	11	12†	14	9	10	6	3	8	10	8	7	105
10	Gustavo Myasava	4	13†	8	4	14	Ret	9	10	13	Ret		6	83
11	Felipe Donato	5	12†	Ret	6	11	12	11†	6	6				67
12	Renato Braga	7	9	11	13	Ret	11	13	11	14	12	10	Ret	59
13	Lukas Moraes				8	4	Ret	8	Ret	Ret	5	7	15	57
14	Renato Jader David				10	15†	3	5	Ret	7	6			56
15	Antônio Matiazzi	Ret	Ret	Ret	11	8	DSQ	7	7	12	9	9	Ret	56
16	Mauri Zacarelli	Ret	Ret	10	7	12	7	Ret	NC	11	15†	11	Ret	46
17	Flávio Matheus	12†	Ret	Ret	15	18†	Ret	14	4	16†	Ret		8	42
18	Tito Morestoni	Ret	8		12	16†	8	10						31
19	Gustavo Frigotto								Ret	17		5	11	24
20	Marco Túlio Souza	8	Ret	9										17
21	Pietro Rimbano												9	16
22	Gustavo Lima	Ret	6	Ret	Ret	17†								11
23	Fernando Croce												12	10
24	Victor Amorim								NC	15	11	Ret	Ret	8
25	Wilson da Costa, Jr.				Ret	13								4
	Beto Cavaleiro											Ret		0
	Duilio Squassoni												Ret	0
	Peter Junior	DNS	DNS											0
Pos	Driver	GOI		VEL	CUR		SCZ		GOI		CAS	TAR	INT	Pts

Colour	Result
Gold	Winner
Silver	Second place
Bronze	Third place
Green	Points classification
Blue	Non-points classification
Blue	Non-classified finish (NC)
Purple	Retired, not classified (Ret)
Red	Did not qualify (DNQ)
Red	Did not pre-qualify (DNPQ)
Black	Disqualified (DSQ)
White	Did not start (DNS)
White	Withdrew (WD)
White	Race cancelled (C)
Blank	Did not practice (DNP)
Blank	Did not arrive (DNA)
Blank	Excluded (EX)

**Bold** — Pole position
Italics — Fastest lap

=== Teams' Championship ===
Pos	Team	No.	GOI		VEL	CUR		SCZ		GOI		CAS	TAR	INT	Pts
1	Motortech Competições	31	2	10	1	1	1	**1**	DSQ	1	2	7	**1**	14	300
1	Motortech Competições	35	3	3	Ret	Ret	6	2	Ret	8	5	8	2	5	300
2	Voxx Racing	79	11	11	12†	14	9	10	6	3	8	10	8	7	276
2	Voxx Racing	128	10	Ret	**3**	2	5	6	1	2	1	3	4	3	276
3	W2 Racing	23	**1**	2	2	Ret	3	13†	12	DSQ	10	2	3	13	237
3	W2 Racing	66	Ret	5	4	**Ret**	2	14†	2	**DSQ**	3	14	Ret	**1**	237
4	J. Star Racing	69	4	13†	8	4	14	Ret	9	10	13	Ret		6	219
4	J. Star Racing	99	6	4	7	5	10	5	3	9†	9	13	12†	2	219
5	R. Sports Racing	2	Ret	Ret	10	7	12	7	Ret	NC	11	15†	11	Ret	168
5	R. Sports Racing	3	Ret	8											168
5	R. Sports Racing	11			6	9	7	9	4	5	4	4	6	10	168
6	RKL Competições	33	Ret	Ret	Ret	11	8	DSQ	7	7	12	9	9	Ret	115
6	RKL Competições	55	7	9	11	13	Ret	11	13	11	14	12	10	Ret	115
7	Bravar Motorsport	28	9	1	5	3	Ret	4	Ret	Ret	Ret	**1**		4	113
7	Bravar Motorsport	38												Ret	113
8	Hitech Racing	11	Ret	7											107
8	Hitech Racing	25				10	15†	3	5	Ret	7	6			107
8	Hitech Racing	36								4	16†	Ret			107
8	Hitech Racing	84												12	107
8	Hitech Racing	120	8	Ret	9										107
9	Nascar Motorsport	9	5	12†	Ret	6	11	12	11†	6	6				71
9	Nascar Motorsport	18	DNS	DNS											71
9	Nascar Motorsport	77				Ret	13								71
10	RR Racing	111				8	4	Ret	8	Ret	Ret	5	7	15	57
11	C2 Team	17												9	37
11	C2 Team	36	12†	Ret	Ret	15	18†	Ret	14						37
11	C2 Team	53	Ret	6	Ret	Ret	17†								37
12	RKL Competições 2	86								Ret	17		5	11	24
13	Motortech Competições 2	3				12	16†	8	10						22
14	Nascar Motorsport 2	36												8	18
15	R. Sports Racing 2	52								NC	15	11	Ret	Ret	
	C2 Team 2	7											Ret		0
Pos	Team	No.	GOI		VEL	CUR		SCZ		GOI		CAS	TAR	INT	Pts

Colour	Result
Gold	Winner
Silver	Second place
Bronze	Third place
Green	Points classification
Blue	Non-points classification
Blue	Non-classified finish (NC)
Purple	Retired, not classified (Ret)
Red	Did not qualify (DNQ)
Red	Did not pre-qualify (DNPQ)
Black	Disqualified (DSQ)
White	Did not start (DNS)
White	Withdrew (WD)
White	Race cancelled (C)
Blank	Did not practice (DNP)
Blank	Did not arrive (DNA)
Blank	Excluded (EX)

**Bold** — Pole position
Italics — Fastest lap
