= 2016 Campeonato Brasileiro de Turismo season =

Car racing competition

The 2016 Agua da Serra Campeonato Brasileiro de Turismo (Brazilian Touring Championship), also known as Stock Car Brasil Light, is the fourth season of the Campeonato Brasileiro de Turismo, a second-tier series to Stock Car Brasil.

== Teams and drivers ==
- All cars were powered by V8 engines and used the JL chassis. All drivers were Brazilian-registered.

Team	No.	Driver	Rounds
Nascar Motorsport	1	Danilo Estrela	3
Nascar Motorsport	2	Mauri Zacarelli	1–4
Nascar Motorsport	7	Luca Milani	5
Nascar Motorsport	33	Antonio Matiazi	7–8
J. Star Racing	9	Felipe Donato	1–2
J. Star Racing	41	Artur Fortunato	3
J. Star Racing	69	Gustavo Myasava	All
RKL Motorsports	10	Raphael Cordeiro	8
RKL Motorsports	86	Gustavo Frigotto	All
RKL Motorsports	104	Edson Bueno	6
Cimed Racing	17	Pietro Rimbano	All
Cimed Racing	79	Adibe Marques	All
C2 Team	23	Marco Cozzi	All
C2 Team	33	Antonio Matiazi	3–4
C2 Team	83	Gabriel Casagrande	1–2
C2 Team	94	Gustavo Kirlya	6
Motortech Competições	31	Marcio Campos	All
Motortech Competições	35	Gabriel Robe	All
RZ Motorsport	33	Antonio Matiazi	1–2, 5–6
Hitech Racing	70	Giulio Borlenghi	6–8
Hitech Racing	77	Raphael Reis	All
W2 Racing	99	Edson Coelho Junior	All
W2 Racing	128	Dennis Dirani	All
RR Racing	111	Lukas Moraes	1–6, 8
