= Rafael Daniel =

Brazilian racing driver

- Nationality: (Brazil) Brazilian
- Born: December 12, 1983 (age 42) São Paulo (Brazil)

Stock Car Brasil career
- Debut season: 2007
- Current team: Bassani Racing
- Car number: 3
- Starts: 2
- Wins: 0
- Poles: 0
- Fastest laps: 0
- Best finish: NC in 2007

Rafael Daniel (born December 12, 1983, in São Paulo) is a Brazilian racing driver. He has raced in such series as Stock Car Brasil and FIA GT1 World Championship. He won the Stock Car Brasil second tier in 2009, 2011 and 2012.

== Racing record ==
=== Career summary ===
Season	Series	Team	Races	Poles	Wins	Podiums	F/Laps	Points	Position
2005	Stock Car Light	W2 Racing	9	1	0	3	0	97	4th
2006	Stock Car Light	W2 Racing	9	0	0	4	3	114	4th
2007	Stock Car Light	W2 Racing	7	0	0	1	0	49	10th
2007	Stock Car Brasil	Scuderia 111	2	0	0	0	0	0	NC
2008	Copa Vicar	Pauta Racing/DCM	9	2	2	3	0	106	2nd
2009	Copa Vicar	Full Time Sports	8	0	1	5	2	117	1st
2009	GT3 Brasil Championship	Scuderia 111	2	1	1	1	1	31	25th
2010	Copa Chevrolet Montana	Scuderia 111	9	1	0	3	1	94	3rd
2010	GT Brasil	Scuderia 111 (GT3)	10	1	2	3	0	98	13th
2010	FIA GT1 World Championship	Reiter	4	0	0	0	0	11	35th
2011	Copa Chevrolet Montana	Gramacho Racing	9	4	4	6	3	137.5	1st
2011	GT Brasil	Scuderia 111 (GT3)	3	0	0	0	0	3	28th

=== Complete GT1 World Championship results ===
Year	Team	Car	1	2	3	4	5	6	7	8	9	10	11	12	13	14	15	16	17	18	19	20	Pos	Points
2010	Reiter	Lamborghini	ABU; QR; 10	ABU; CR; 5	SIL; QR	SIL; CR	BRN; QR	BRN; CR	PRI; QR; 13	PRI; CR; 10	SPA; QR	SPA; CR	NÜR; QR	NÜR; CR	ALG; QR	ALG; CR	NAV; QR	NAV; CR	INT; QR	INT; CR	SAN; QR	SAN; CR	35th	11

=== Complete Stock Car Brasil results ===
Year	Team	Car	1	2	3	4	5	6	7	8	9	10	11	12	Pos	Points
2007	Scuderia 111	Chevrolet Astra	INT	CTB	CGD	INT	LON	SCZ	CTB; Ret	BSB; 18	ARG	TAR	RIO	INT	NC	0
2012	RC3 Bassani	Peugeot 408	INT	CTB	VEL	RBP	LON; 28	RIO; Ret	SAL	CGD	TAR	CTB	BSB	INT	36th	0
