= Andreas Mattheis =

Brazilian retired automobile racing driver

Andreas Mattheis (born May 24, 1954 in Petrópolis, Rio de Janeiro) is a Brazilian retired automobile racing driver.

== Personal life ==
Mattheis is father of, racing driver Rodolpho Mattheis, TV presenter Fiorella Mattheis, Alexandre Mattheis, and, columnist Aline Mattheis.

== Racing career ==
=== Driving career ===
He won for four times in Campeonato Brasileiro de Marcas e Pilotos and twice in the GT3 Brasil Championship.

=== Team career ===
Mattheis is owner of three teams, in Stock Car Brasil:

- WA Mattheis-Red Bull (Red Bull Racing Brasil), Red Bull branded in 2007; est. 2007
- A.Mattheis-Shell; est. 1995.
- R. Mattheis Motorsport-Red Bull (Red Bull Racing Mattheis); est. 2013. Mattheis formed this team with his son Rodolpho.

His teams have won the title in 2005, 2008, 2009, 2011, 2012.
