= Gustavo Sondermann =

Brazilian racing driver (1982–2011)

- Nationality: (Brazil) Brazilian
- Born: February 17, 1982
- Died: April 3, 2011 (aged 29) Interlagos, Brazil

Stock Car Brasil
- Years active: 2010–2011
- Teams: Gramacho Costa
- Starts: 7
- Wins: 0
- Poles: 0
- Fastest laps: 0
- Best finish: 31st in 2010

Previous series
- 2006–2011 2010 2010 2008 2005 2004 2004 2003 2002–2003: Copa Chevrolet Montana etc. GT4 Brasil Championship; Mini Challenge Brasil; Pick Up Racing Brasil; Eurocup FRenault 2.0; FRenault 2.0 UK; FRenault 2.0 USA Winter Series; FRenault 2.0 Fran-Am; FRenault 2.0 Brazil

Championship titles
- 2008: Pick Up Racing Brasil

Gustavo Sondermann (February 17, 1982 – April 3, 2011) was a Brazilian racing driver.

== Career ==
Sondermann began racing karts at the age of sixteen and soon moved up to the Brazilian Formula Renault championship for 2002, in which he competed for two years with mixed results. In 2004, he moved to Europe to compete in the equivalent British series, and also made a guest appearance in the Formula Renault Eurocup the following year, but subsequently returned to Brazil in 2006 to compete in the national stock car championship.

Sondermann competed in the second tier of the series, known variously as Stock Car Light, Stock Car Copa Vicar and latterly as the Copa Chevrolet Montana from 2006 until 2011, winning four races in total and with a best finish of third place in the championship in 2007, a year soured by the death of his team-mate, Rafael Sperafico, in the season finale. In 2010, he competed in seven races of the premier Stock Car Brasil division, scoring six points and finishing in 31st place in the championship. He also competed in the third-tier Mini Challenge series, the GT4 Brasil Championship and the Pick Up Racing Brasil series, winning the last of these in 2008.

=== Complete Eurocup Formula Renault 2.0 results ===
(key) (Races in bold indicate pole position; races in italics indicate fastest lap)

Year	Entrant	1	2	3	4	5	6	7	8	9	10	11	12	13	14	15	16	DC	Points
2005	Comtec Racing	ZOL; 1	ZOL; 2	VAL; 1	VAL; 2	LMS; 1	LMS; 2	BIL; 1	BIL; 2	OSC; 1	OSC; 2	DON; 1; 17	DON; 2; 16	EST; 1	EST; 2	MNZ; 1	MNZ; 2	NC†	0

† As Sondermann was a guest driver, he was ineligible for points

== Death ==
During the first race of the 2011 Copa Chevrolet Montana season, held in heavy rain at the Autódromo José Carlos Pace, Sondermann was hit by several cars and ultimately by Pedro Boesel at the fast Curva do Café before the start-finish straight. He was extricated from his car and transferred to hospital in a coma after having had cardiac arrest, where he later was diagnosed brain-dead. His organs were donated.
