= Chevrolet Montana =

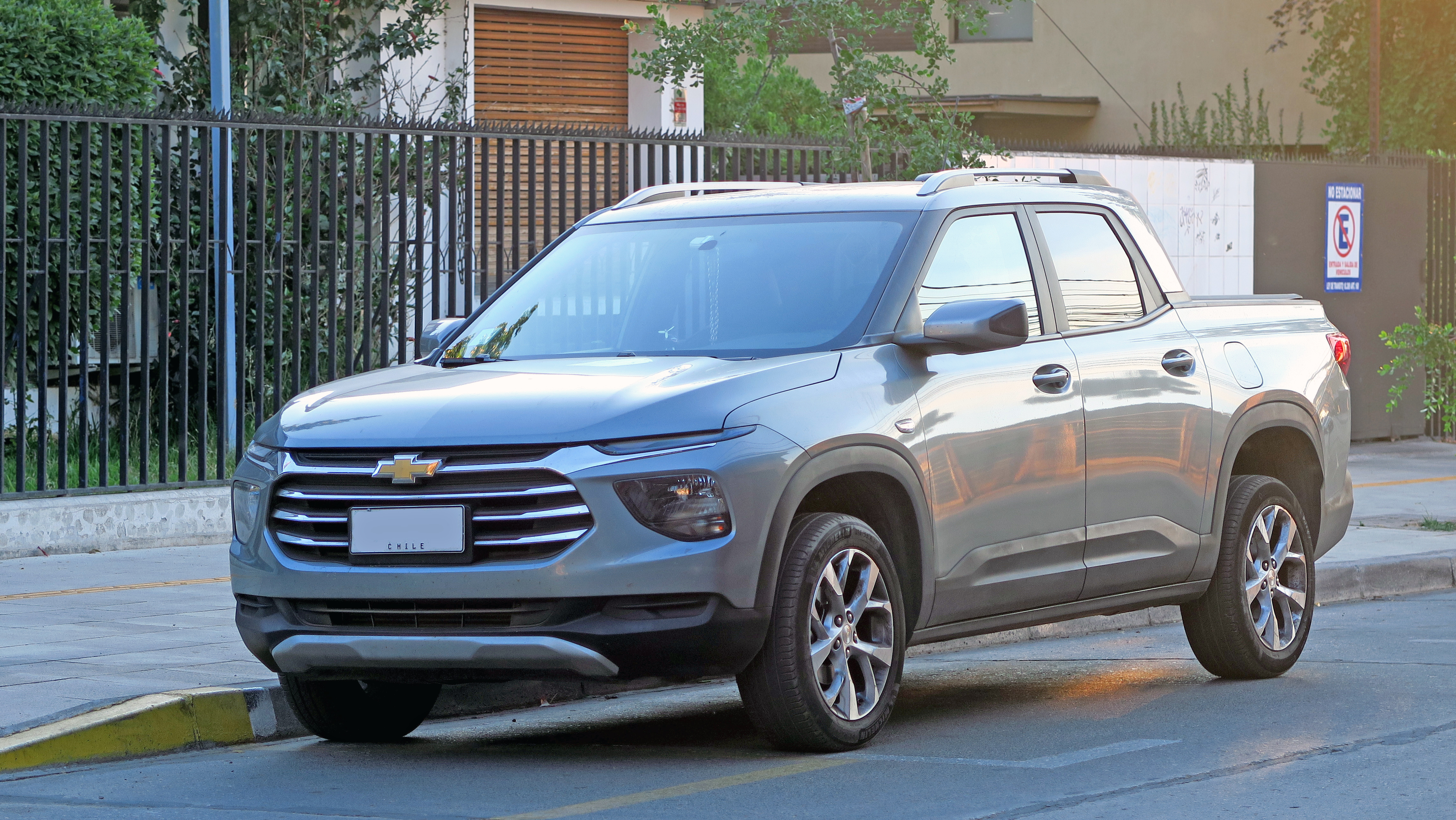
- 2023 Chevrolet Montana LTZ

Overview
- Manufacturer: General Motors
- Also called: Chevrolet Tornado (Mexico, 2003–2020); Chevrolet Utility (South Africa, 2012–2017); Opel Corsa Utility (South Africa, 2010–2012)
- Production: 2003–2021; 2023–present

Body and chassis
- Class: Subcompact coupé utility (2003–2021); Compact pickup truck (2023–present)
- Layout: Front-engine, front-wheel drive
- Chassis: Unibody

Chronology
- Predecessor: Chevrolet Corsa Pick-up

The Chevrolet Montana is a front-wheel drive coupé utility (first two generations) / compact pickup truck (third generation) manufactured by General Motors under the Chevrolet brand since 2003. Mainly produced in Brazil and marketed throughout Latin America, the first- and second-generation Montanas were also produced and marketed in South Africa as the Opel Corsa Utility, Chevrolet Corsa Utility, and Chevrolet Utility. In Mexico, the first- and second-generation Montanas were known as Chevrolet Tornado, because Pontiac had already used the Montana name for its minivan offering for North America.

The design of the first generation is a variation of the Opel Corsa, while the second generation is based on the Chevrolet Agile. The third-generation Montana entered production in 2023 as a larger, four-door pickup based on the GEM platform.

== First generation (2003) ==
First generation
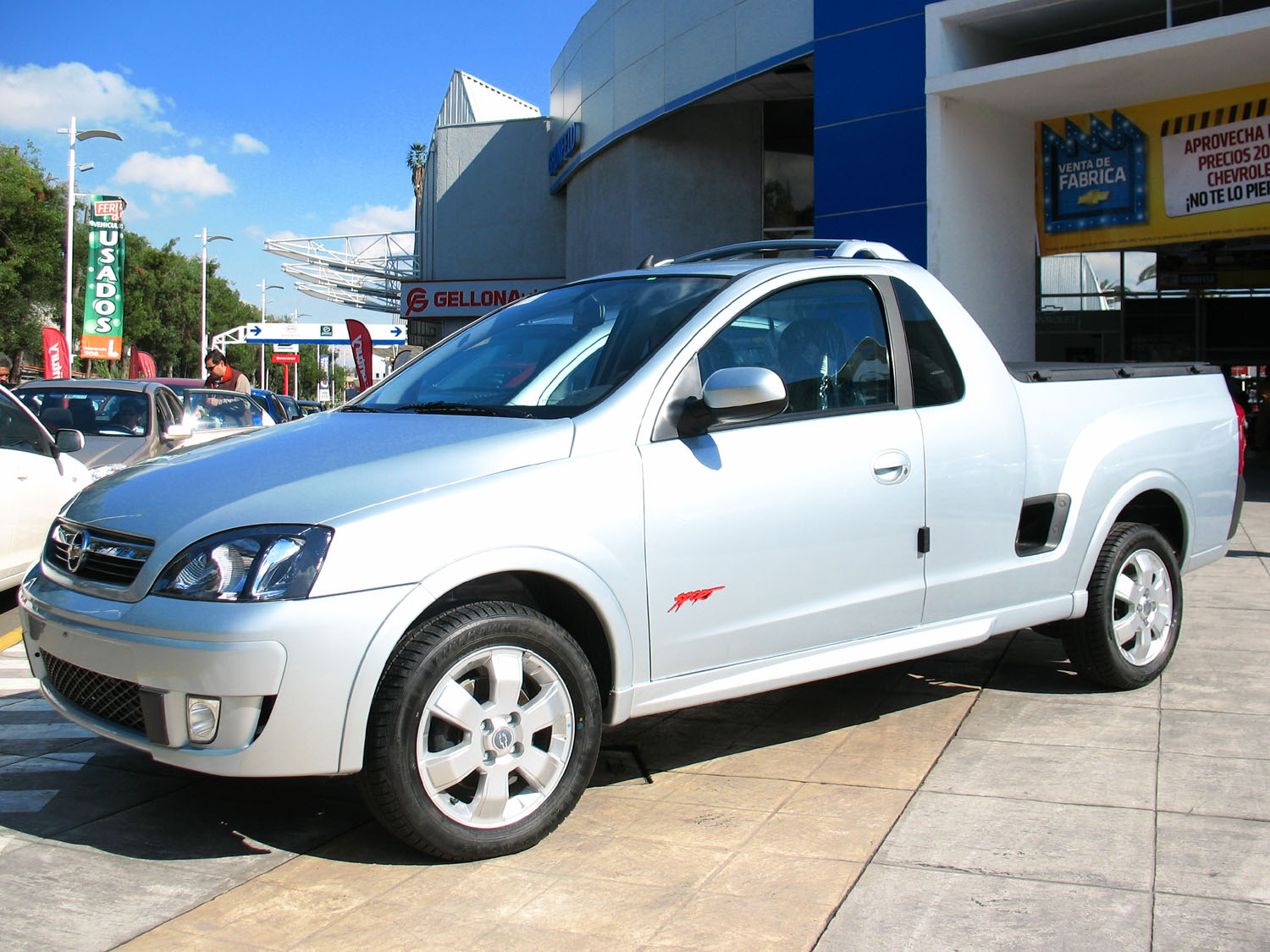
- 2009 Chevrolet Montana

Overview
- Also called: Chevrolet Tornado (Mexico); Opel Corsa Utility (South Africa, 2003–2010); Chevrolet Corsa Utility (South Africa, 2010–2012)
- Production: 2003–2011
- Assembly: Brazil: São José dos Campos (GM Brazil); South Africa: Port Elizabeth (GM South Africa)

Body and chassis
- Class: Coupé utility
- Body style: 2-door pickup
- Related: Opel Corsa C Opel Combo C

Powertrain
- Engine: Petrol: 1.4 L EconoFlex I4; 1.8 L Family 1 I4; Diesel: 1.7 L Isuzu Circle-L I4
- Transmission: 5-speed manual

Dimensions
- Wheelbase: 2,714 mm (106.9 in)
- Length: 4,430 mm (174.4 in)
- Width: 1,645 mm (64.8 in)
- Height: 1,420 mm (55.9 in)

The Montana used a 1.4 L "Ecoflex" and a 1.8 L 8V flex-fuel I4 engines. In some markets, such as South Africa, where it was sold as the Opel Corsa Utility until June 2010, the vehicle was offered with more engine options, but none was flex fuel, like the 1.4 petrol and the 1.7 Isuzu turbodiesel.

In 2007, the Montana was available in two versions: Montana Conquest and Montana Sport, which had a slightly different design and set of accessories. The trunk can be loaded with up to 735 kg (1,620 lb) according to the manufacturer.

This model was manufactured in São José dos Campos, Brazil, until 2010. In South Africa, it was assembled from Brazilian-supplied complete knock down units.

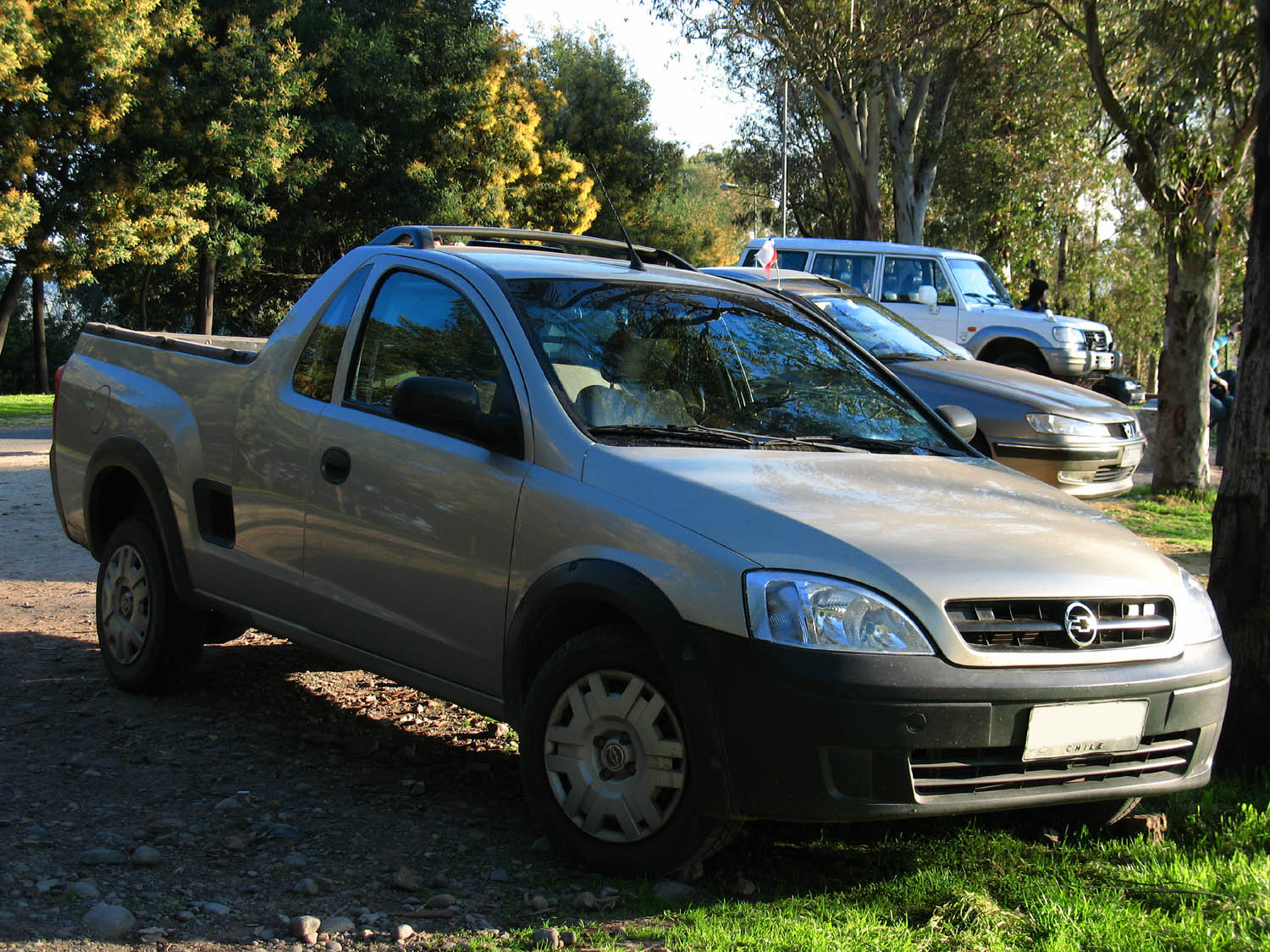
2006 Chevrolet Montana

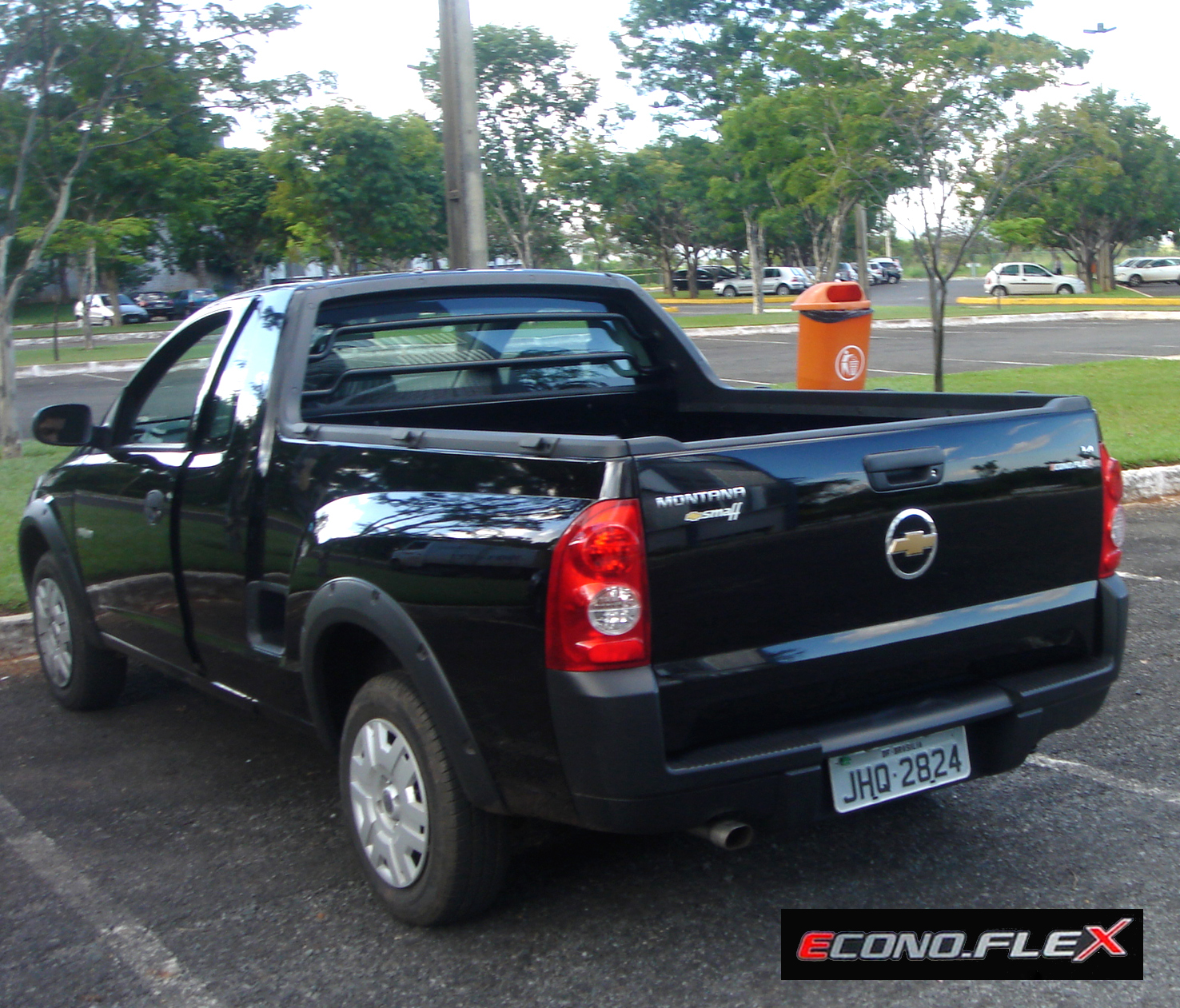
Rear view

=== Mexico ===
The Montana arrived in the model year of 2004, replacing the aged Corsa B-based Chevy Pickup, but with the Tornado nameplate, because the Pontiac Montana was available in Mexico at the time.

It was based on the Chevrolet Corsa C. and although the Corsa was dropped from the Mexican Chevrolet line-up after the model year of 2008, the Tornado lived on for a few more years. It was the only car built in Brazil in the Mexican Chevrolet lineup.

=== South Africa ===
The model was released in South Africa in 2003. It was sold as the Opel Corsa Utility, and replaced the Corsa B Utility pickup. In June 2010, General Motors renamed it to Chevrolet Corsa Utility. as the company prepared to phase out Opel in the country. It was available in a choice of three engine variations, namely 1.4 and 1.8 petrol engines, and a 1.7 turbodiesel. Three different trim levels were available across the range: Base, Club, and Sport.

== Second generation (2010) ==
Second generation
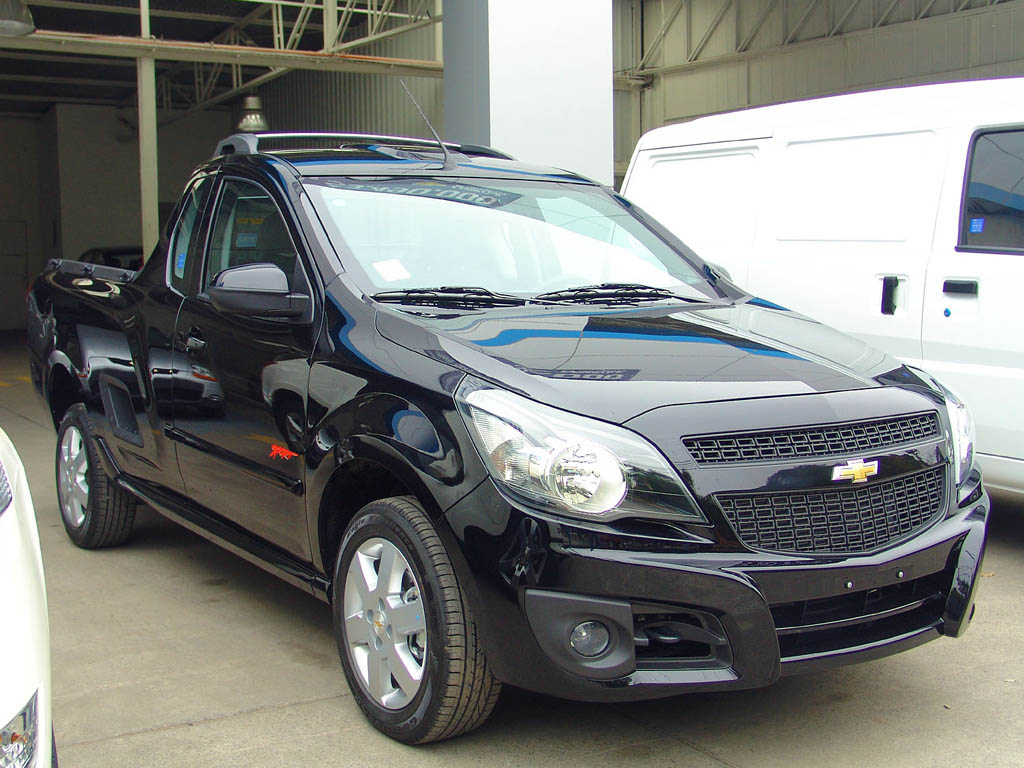

Overview
- Also called: Chevrolet Tornado (Mexico); Chevrolet Utility (South Africa)
- Production: 2010–2021 (Brazil); 2012–2017 (South Africa)
- Assembly: Brazil: São Caetano do Sul (GM Brazil); South Africa: Port Elizabeth (GM South Africa)

Body and chassis
- Class: Coupé utility
- Body style: 2-door pickup
- Related: Chevrolet Agile

Powertrain
- Engine: Petrol: 1.4 L EconoFlex I4; Diesel: 1.3 L Multijet I4
- Transmission: 5-speed manual

Dimensions
- Wheelbase: 2,669 mm (105.1 in)
- Length: 4,514 mm (177.7 in)
- Width: 1,700 mm (66.9 in)
- Height: 1,578 mm (62.1 in)

Despite short sales of the Chevrolet Corsa Utility in South Africa, Chevrolet had decided to replace the Corsa C Utility with the Agile Utility. It became known as the Montana, Tornado, or Utility, depending on the market.

The Tornado was discontinued in Mexico in 2020.

=== South Africa ===
The vehicle was introduced in South Africa as the Chevrolet Utility in 2012.

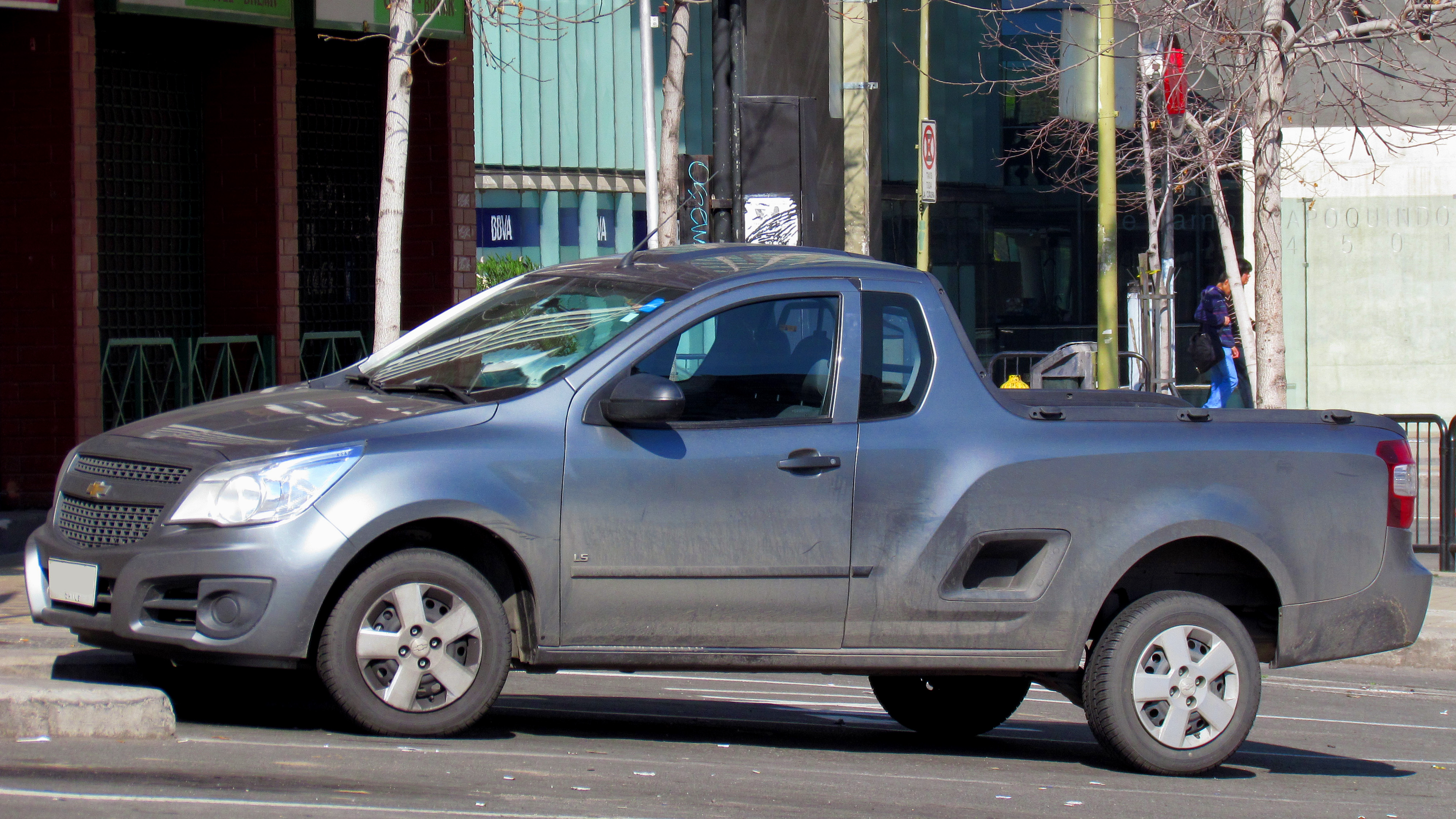
2012 Chevrolet Montana LS (side view)

== Third generation (2023) ==
Third generation
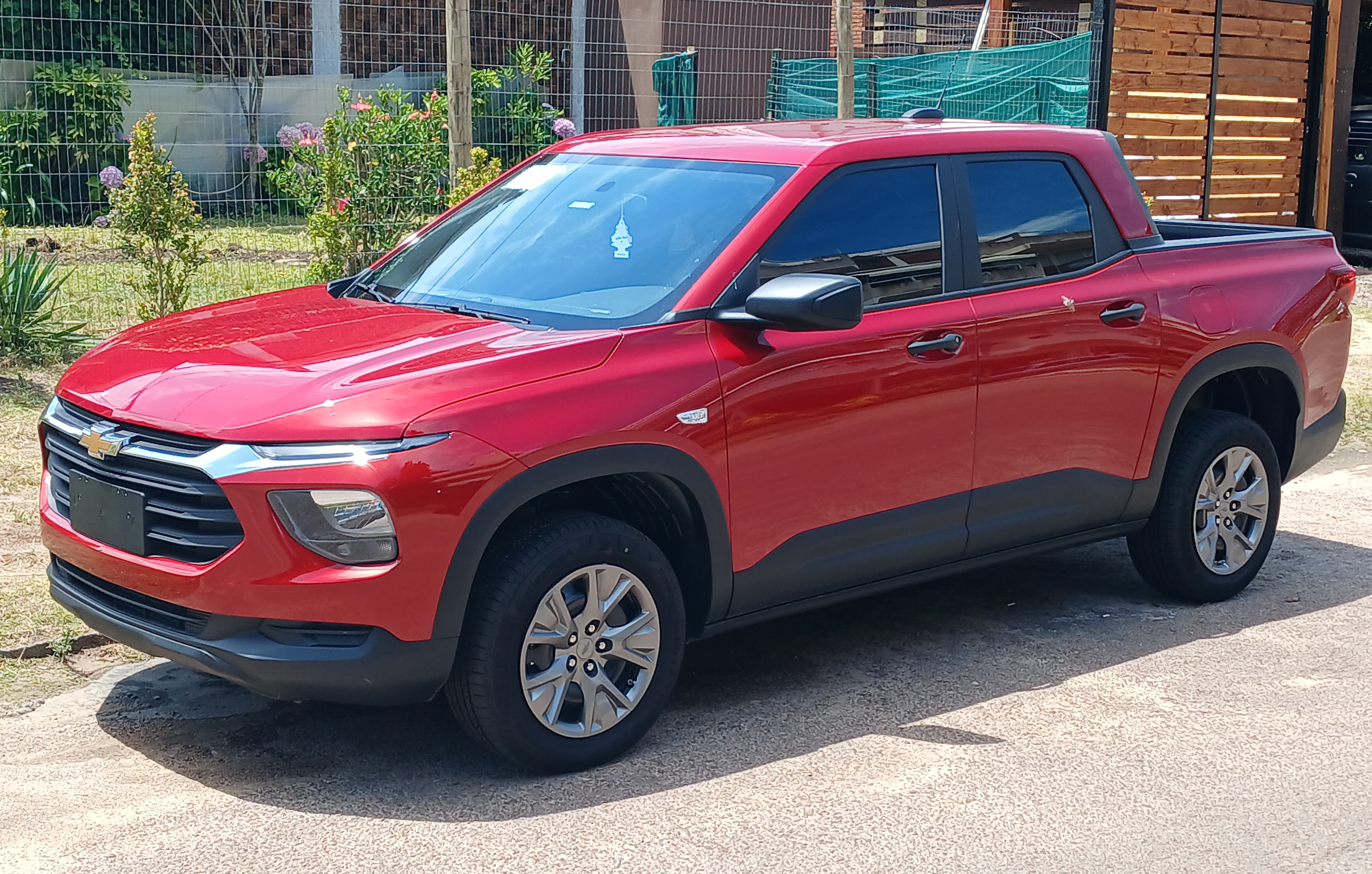
- 2023 Chevrolet Montana LS (Uruguay)

Overview
- Production: 2023–present
- Assembly: Brazil: São Caetano do Sul (GM Brasil)

Body and chassis
- Class: Compact pickup truck
- Body style: 4-door pickup
- Platform: GM VSS-F
- Related: Chevrolet Tracker

Powertrain
- Engine: Petrol: 1.2 L L4H turbo I3
- Transmission: 6-speed manual; 6-speed automatic

Dimensions
- Wheelbase: 2,800 mm (110.2 in)
- Length: 4,717 mm (185.7 in)
- Width: 1,798 mm (70.8 in)
- Height: 1,659 mm (65.3 in)

The third-generation Montana was introduced on 1 December 2022 in Brazil. It was a larger pickup with four doors and was based on GEM platform. It is powered by a 1.2-litre, three-cylinder, turbocharged, petrol engine shared with the Tracker, which is rated at 133 PS (131 hp; 98 kW) and 210 N⋅m (155 lb⋅ft) torque. It is built at the São Caetano do Sul plant in Brazil. It is being sold since the first half of 2023 and will also be exported to markets outside of Latin America. The project was previously delayed from 2022 due to the supply-chain shortage.

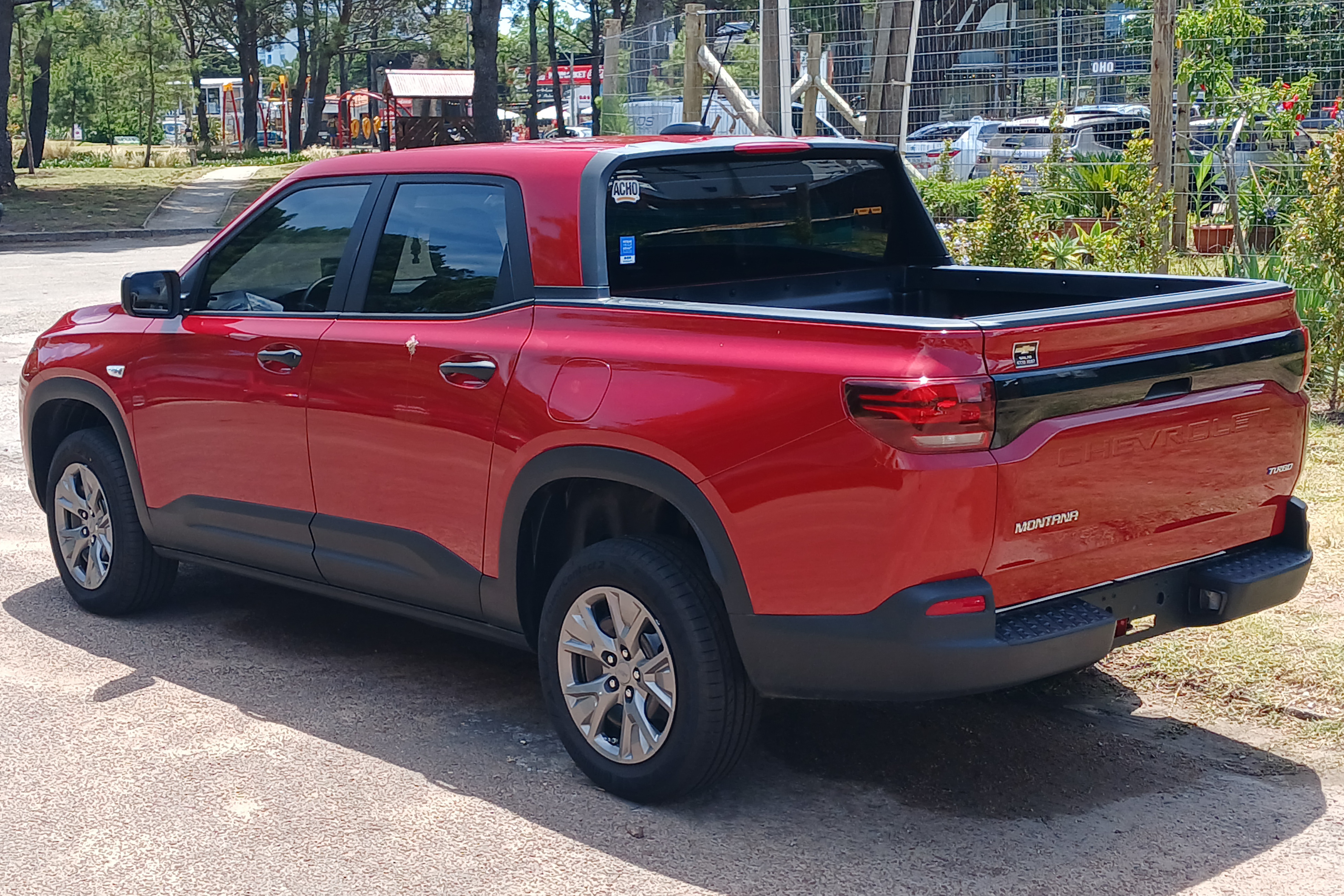
Rear view

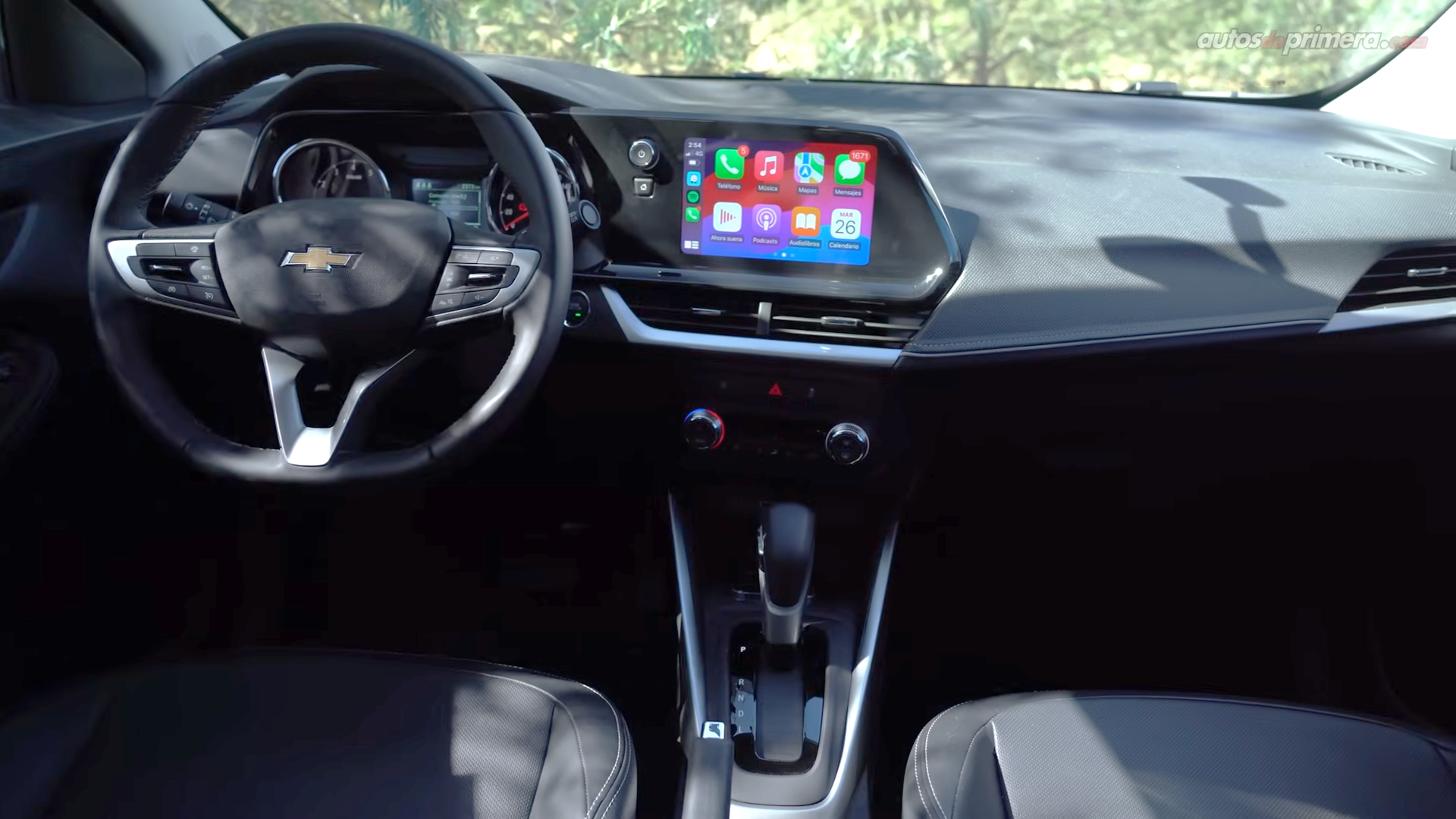
Interior

=== Safety ===
==== Latin NCAP ====
Latin NCAP 3.5 test results Chevrolet Montana + 6 Airbags (2024, similar to Euro NCAP 2017)
Test	Points	%
Overall:	3 /5 stars	
Adult occupant:	31.67	79%
Child occupant:	34.83	71%
Pedestrian:	21.34	44%
Safety assist:	48.00	65%

== Sales ==
Year	Brazil	Argentina
2003	4,154	
2004	21,585	
2005	16,705	
2006	14,757	
2007	22,526	
2008	32,752	
2009	34,020	
2010	36,662	
2011	45,833	2,339
2012	48,480	3,229
2013	46,712	1,896
2014	35,735	414
2015	23,576	614
2016	14,771	361
2017	14,877	304
2018	13,115	190
2019	12,526	244
2020	6,654	
2021	2,182	144
2022	18	
2023	30,021	303
2024	27,724	1,039
2025	20,384	5,049
