= List of 2021 motorsport champions =

2021 motorsport champions
Previous: 2020	Next: 2022

This list of 2021 motorsport champions is a list of national or international motorsport series with championships decided by the points or positions earned by a driver from multiple races where the season was completed during the 2021 calendar year.

== Dirt oval racing ==
Series	Champion	Refer
Lucas Oil Late Model Dirt Series	(United States) Tim McCreadie	2021 Lucas Oil Late Model Dirt Series
World of Outlaws Late Model Series	(United States) Brandon Sheppard	
World of Outlaws Sprint Car Series	(United States) Brad Sweet	
World of Outlaws Sprint Car Series	Teams: (United States) Kasey Kahne Racing	

== Drag racing ==
Series	Champion	refer
NHRA Camping World Drag Racing Series	Top Fuel: (United States) Steve Torrence	2021 NHRA Camping World Drag Racing Series
NHRA Camping World Drag Racing Series	Funny Car: (United States) Ron Capps	2021 NHRA Camping World Drag Racing Series
NHRA Camping World Drag Racing Series	Pro Stock: (United States) Greg Anderson	2021 NHRA Camping World Drag Racing Series
NHRA Camping World Drag Racing Series	Pro Stock Motorcycle: (United States) Matt Smith	2021 NHRA Camping World Drag Racing Series

== Drifting ==
Series	Champion	Refer
British Drift Championship	(United Kingdom) Duane McKeever	2021 British Drift Championship
D1 Grand Prix	(Japan) Naoki Nakamura	2021 D1 Grand Prix series
D1 Grand Prix	D1 Lights: (Japan) Hiroki Vito	2021 D1 Grand Prix series
D1NZ	(New Zealand) Darren Kelly	2021 D1NZ season
D1NZ	Pro-Sport: (New Zealand) Shaun Potroz	2021 D1NZ season
Drift Masters	(Poland) Piotr Więcek	2021 Drift Masters
Drift Masters	Nations Cup: Poland	2021 Drift Masters
Formula D	PRO: (Norway) Fredric Aasbø	2021 Formula Drift season
Formula D	PROSPEC: (Belarus) Dmitriy Brutskiy	2021 Formula Drift season
Formula D	Auto Cup: (Japan) Toyota	2021 Formula Drift season
Formula D	Tires: (Japan) Nitto	2021 Formula Drift season
Formula DRIFT Japan	(Japan) Kouichi Yamashita	2021 Formula DRIFT Japan

== Karting ==
Series	Driver	Season article
CIK-FIA Karting World Championship	OK: (Finland) Tuukka Taponen	
CIK-FIA Karting World Championship	OKJ: (Japan) Kean Nakamura-Berta	
CIK-FIA Karting World Championship	KZ: (Sweden) Noah Milell	
CIK-FIA Karting World Championship	KZ2: (Italy) Lorenzo Travisanutto	
CIK-FIA Karting Academy Trophy	(Poland) Maciej Gładysz	2021 CIK-FIA Karting Academy Trophy
CIK-FIA Karting European Championship	OK: (Italy) Andrea Kimi Antonelli	
CIK-FIA Karting European Championship	OK-J: (United Kingdom) Freddie Slater	
CIK-FIA Karting European Championship	KZ: (Italy) Riccardo Longhi	
CIK-FIA Karting European Championship	KZ2: (Italy) Giacomo Pollini	
WSK Champions Cup	KZ2: (Sweden) Viktor Gustafsson	
WSK Champions Cup	OK: (Brazil) Rafael Câmara	
WSK Champions Cup	OKJ: (United Arab Emirates) Rashid Al Dhaheri	
WSK Champions Cup	60 Mini: (Netherlands) René Lammers	
WSK Euro Series	OK: (United Kingdom) Arvid Lindblad	
WSK Euro Series	OKJ: (United Kingdom) Harley Keeble	
WSK Euro Series	60 Mini: (Spain) Christian Costoya	
Rotax Max Challenge	DD2: (Netherlands) Martijn van Leeuwen	
Rotax Max Challenge	DD2 Masters: (France) Morgan Riche	
Rotax Max Challenge	Senior: (United Kingdom) Mark Kimber	
Rotax Max Challenge	Junior: (Latvia) Tomass Štolcermanis	
Rotax Max Challenge	Mini: (Japan) Arata Endo	
Rotax Max Challenge	Micro: (Estonia) Nikita Ljubimov	
Rotax Max Challenge	Nations Cup: France	

== Motorcycle racing ==
Series	Champion	refer
MotoGP World Championship	(France) Fabio Quartararo	2021 MotoGP World Championship
MotoGP World Championship	Teams: (Italy) Ducati Lenovo Team	2021 MotoGP World Championship
MotoGP World Championship	Constructors: (Italy) Ducati	2021 MotoGP World Championship
Moto2 World Championship	(Australia) Remy Gardner	2021 Moto2 World Championship
Moto2 World Championship	Teams: (Finland) Red Bull KTM Ajo	2021 Moto2 World Championship
Moto2 World Championship	Constructors: (Germany) Kalex	2021 Moto2 World Championship
Moto3 World Championship	(Spain) Pedro Acosta	2021 Moto3 World Championship
Moto3 World Championship	Teams: (Finland) Red Bull KTM Ajo	2021 Moto3 World Championship
Moto3 World Championship	Constructors: (Austria) KTM	2021 Moto3 World Championship
MotoE World Cup	(Spain) Jordi Torres	2021 MotoE World Cup
Red Bull MotoGP Rookies Cup	(Colombia) David Alonso	2021 Red Bull MotoGP Rookies Cup
Superbike World Championship	(Turkey) Toprak Razgatlıoğlu	2021 Superbike World Championship
Superbike World Championship	Constructors: (Japan) Yamaha	2021 Superbike World Championship
Supersport World Championship	(Switzerland) Dominique Aegerter	2021 Supersport World Championship
Supersport World Championship	Constructors: (Japan) Yamaha	2021 Supersport World Championship
Supersport 300 World Championship	(Spain) Adrián Huertas	2021 Supersport 300 World Championship
Supersport 300 World Championship	Constructors: (Japan) Kawasaki	2021 Supersport 300 World Championship
FIM CEV Moto2 European Championship	(Spain) Fermín Aldeguer	2021 FIM CEV Moto2 European Championship
FIM CEV Moto2 European Championship	Constructors: (Italy) Boscoscuro	2021 FIM CEV Moto2 European Championship
FIM CEV Moto3 Junior World Championship	(Spain) Daniel Holgado	2021 FIM CEV Moto3 Junior World Championship
FIM CEV Moto3 Junior World Championship	Constructors: (Austria) KTM	2021 FIM CEV Moto3 Junior World Championship
FIM Endurance World Championship	(France) #1 Yoshimura SERT Motul	2021 FIM Endurance World Championship
FIM Endurance World Championship	Manufacturers: (Japan) Yamaha	2021 FIM Endurance World Championship
Asia Talent Cup	(Japan) Taiyo Furusato	2021 Asia Talent Cup
Australian Superbike Championship	(Australia) Wayne Maxwell	
European Talent Cup	(Spain) Máximo Martínez	2021 European Talent Cup
FIM Sidecar World Championship	(Switzerland) Markus Schlosser	2021 Sidecar World Championship
FIM Sidecar World Championship	Passenger: (Switzerland) Marcel Fries	2021 Sidecar World Championship
MotoAmerica Superbike Championship	(United States) Jake Gagne	2021 MotoAmerica Superbike Championship
MotoAmerica Superbike Championship	Manufacturers: (Japan) Yamaha	2021 MotoAmerica Superbike Championship
MotoAmerica Superbike Championship	Stock 1000: (United States) Jake Lewis	2021 MotoAmerica Superbike Championship
MotoAmerica Superbike Championship	Supersport: (United States) Sean Dylan Kelly	2021 MotoAmerica Superbike Championship
MotoAmerica Superbike Championship	Twins Cup: (United States) Kaleb De Keyrel	2021 MotoAmerica Superbike Championship
MotoAmerica Superbike Championship	Junior Cup: (United States) Tyler Scott	2021 MotoAmerica Superbike Championship

=== Motocross ===
Series	Champion	refer
FIM Motocross World Championship	MXGP: (Netherlands) Jeffrey Herlings	2021 FIM Motocross World Championship
FIM Motocross World Championship	MXGP Manufacturers: (Austria) KTM	2021 FIM Motocross World Championship
FIM Motocross World Championship	MX2: (France) Maxime Renaux	2021 FIM Motocross World Championship
FIM Motocross World Championship	MX2 Manufacturers: (Japan) Yamaha	2021 FIM Motocross World Championship
FIM Women's Motocross World Championship	(New Zealand) Courtney Duncan	2021 FIM Women's Motocross World Championship
FIM Women's Motocross World Championship	Manufacturers: (Japan) Kawasaki	2021 FIM Women's Motocross World Championship
FIM Enduro World Championship	EnduroGP: (United Kingdom) Brad Freeman	2021 FIM Enduro World Championship
FIM Enduro World Championship	Enduro 1: (Italy) Andrea Verona	2021 FIM Enduro World Championship
FIM Enduro World Championship	Enduro 2: (Spain) Josep García	2021 FIM Enduro World Championship
FIM Enduro World Championship	Enduro 3: (United Kingdom) Brad Freeman	2021 FIM Enduro World Championship
FIM Enduro World Championship	Junior: (Italy) Matteo Pavoni	2021 FIM Enduro World Championship
FIM Enduro World Championship	Junior 1: (Italy) Lorenzo Macoritto	2021 FIM Enduro World Championship
FIM Enduro World Championship	Junior 2: (Italy) Matteo Pavoni	2021 FIM Enduro World Championship
FIM Enduro World Championship	Youth: (Sweden) Albin Norrbin	2021 FIM Enduro World Championship
FIM Enduro World Championship	Women: (Spain) Laia Sanz	2021 FIM Enduro World Championship
FIM Enduro World Championship	Open 2-Stroke: (Portugal) Gonçalo Reis	2021 FIM Enduro World Championship
FIM Enduro World Championship	Open 4-Stroke: (Estonia) Priit Biene	2021 FIM Enduro World Championship
AMA Supercross Championship	450 SX: (United States) Cooper Webb	2021 AMA Supercross Championship
AMA Supercross Championship	250 SX East: (United States) Colt Nichols	2021 AMA Supercross Championship
AMA Supercross Championship	250 SX West: (United States) Justin Cooper	2021 AMA Supercross Championship
European Motocross Championship	EMX250: (Italy) Nicholas Lapucci	2021 European Motocross Championship
European Motocross Championship	EMX250 Manufacturers: (Italy) Fantic	2021 European Motocross Championship
European Motocross Championship	EMX125: (Italy) Valerio Lata	2021 European Motocross Championship
European Motocross Championship	EMX125 Manufacturers: (Austria) KTM	2021 European Motocross Championship
European Motocross Championship	EMX Open: (Italy) Davide De Bortoli	2021 European Motocross Championship
European Motocross Championship	EMX Open Manufacturers: (Japan) Honda	2021 European Motocross Championship
European Motocross Championship	EMX2T: (Germany) Maximilian Spies	2021 European Motocross Championship
European Motocross Championship	EMX2T Manufacturers: (Italy) Fantic	2021 European Motocross Championship
European Motocross Championship	EMX85: (Czech Republic) Vítězslav Marek	2021 European Motocross Championship
European Motocross Championship	EMX65: (Estonia) Lucas Leok	2021 European Motocross Championship

== Open wheel racing ==
Series	Champion	refer
FIA Formula One World Championship	(Netherlands) Max Verstappen	2021 Formula One World Championship
FIA Formula One World Championship	Constructors: (Germany) Mercedes	2021 Formula One World Championship
FIA Formula 2 Championship	(Australia) Oscar Piastri	2021 Formula 2 Championship
FIA Formula 2 Championship	Teams: (Italy) Prema Racing	2021 Formula 2 Championship
FIA Formula E Championship	(Netherlands) Nyck de Vries	2020–21 Formula E Championship
FIA Formula E Championship	Teams: (Germany) Mercedes-EQ Formula E Team	2020–21 Formula E Championship
FIA Masters Historic Formula One Championship	Stewart class: (Switzerland) Nicolas Matile	2021 FIA Masters Historic Formula One Championship
FIA Masters Historic Formula One Championship	Fittipaldi class: (Austria) Lukas Halusa	2021 FIA Masters Historic Formula One Championship
FIA Masters Historic Formula One Championship	Head class: (United Kingdom) Mike Cantillon	2021 FIA Masters Historic Formula One Championship
FIA Masters Historic Formula One Championship	Lauda class: (United Kingdom) Mark Hazell	2021 FIA Masters Historic Formula One Championship
IndyCar Series	(Spain) Álex Palou	2021 IndyCar Series
IndyCar Series	Manufacturers: (Japan) Honda	2021 IndyCar Series
IndyCar Series	Rookies: (New Zealand) Scott McLaughlin	2021 IndyCar Series
Indy Lights	(United States) Kyle Kirkwood	2021 Indy Lights
Indy Lights	Teams: (United States) HMD Motorsports	2021 Indy Lights
Indy Pro 2000 Championship	(Denmark) Christian Rasmussen	2021 Indy Pro 2000 Championship
Indy Pro 2000 Championship	Teams: (United States) Exclusive Autosport	2021 Indy Pro 2000 Championship
BOSS GP Series	(Germany) Ulf Ehninger	2021 BOSS GP Series
BOSS GP Series	Formula: (Italy) Marco Ghiotto	2021 BOSS GP Series
Atlantic Championship Series	(United States) Dudley Fleck	2021 Atlantic Championship
Formula Nordic	(Sweden) William Karlsson	2021 Formula Nordic
Formula Renault 2.0 Argentina (2020-21)	(Argentina) Jorge Barrio	2020-21 Formula Renault 2.0 Argentina
Formula Renault 2.0 Argentina (2021)	(Argentina) Jorge Barrio	2021 Formula Renault 2.0 Argentina
Masters Historic Formula One Championship USA	Stewart class: (United States) Alex MacAllister	2021 Masters Historic Formula One Championship USA
Masters Historic Formula One Championship USA	Fittipaldi class: (United States) Chris Locke	2021 Masters Historic Formula One Championship USA
Masters Historic Formula One Championship USA	Head class: (United Kingdom) Gregory Thornton	2021 Masters Historic Formula One Championship USA
Masters Historic Formula One Championship USA	Lauda class: (United Kingdom) Jamie Constable	2021 Masters Historic Formula One Championship USA
F2000 Italian Formula Trophy	(Italy) Bernarndo Pellegrini	2021 F2000 Italian Formula Trophy
F2000 Italian Formula Trophy	Teams: (Italy) HT Racing	2021 F2000 Italian Formula Trophy
North American Formula 1000 Championship	(United States) Alex Mayer	2021 North American Formula 1000 Championship
S5000 Australian Drivers' Championship	(Australia) Joey Mawson	2021 S5000 Australian Drivers' Championship
Super Formula Championship	(Japan) Tomoki Nojiri	2021 Super Formula Championship
Super Formula Championship	Teams: (Japan) carenex Team Impul	2021 Super Formula Championship
Formula Three
FIA Formula 3 Championship	(Norway) Dennis Hauger	2021 FIA Formula 3 Championship
FIA Formula 3 Championship	Teams: (Italy) Trident	2021 FIA Formula 3 Championship
Drexler-Automotive Formula 3 Cup	(Switzerland) Sandro Zeller	2021 Drexler-Automotive Formula 3 Cup
Drexler-Automotive Formula 3 Cup	Open: (Czech Republic) Vladimir Netušil	2021 Drexler-Automotive Formula 3 Cup
Drexler-Automotive Formula 3 Cup	Trophy: (Germany) Dr. Ralph Pütz	2021 Drexler-Automotive Formula 3 Cup
Drexler-Automotive Formula 3 Cup	Swiss Cup: (Switzerland) Sandro Zeller	2021 Drexler-Automotive Formula 3 Cup
Euroformula Open Championship	(United States) Cameron Das	2021 Euroformula Open Championship
Euroformula Open Championship	Teams: (Germany) Team Motopark	2021 Euroformula Open Championship
Euroformula Open Championship	Rookies: (United Kingdom) Casper Stevenson	2021 Euroformula Open Championship
F3 Asian Championship	(China) Guanyu Zhou	2021 F3 Asian Championship
F3 Asian Championship	Teams: (United Arab Emirates) Abu Dhabi Racing by Prema	2021 F3 Asian Championship
F3 Asian Championship	Rookies: (Japan) Ayumu Iwasa	2021 F3 Asian Championship
Formula Regional Americas Championship	(Cayman Islands) Kyffin Simpson	2021 Formula Regional Americas Championship
Formula Regional Americas Championship	Teams: (United States) (Australia) TJ Speed Motorsports	2021 Formula Regional Americas Championship
Formula Regional European Championship	(Switzerland) Grégoire Saucy	2021 Formula Regional European Championship
Formula Regional European Championship	Teams: (France) R-ace GP	2021 Formula Regional European Championship
Formula Regional Japanese Championship	(Japan) Yuga Furutani	2021 Formula Regional Japanese Championship
Formula Regional Japanese Championship	Teams: (Japan) TOM'S Youth	2021 Formula Regional Japanese Championship
Formula Regional Japanese Championship	Masters: (Japan) Takashi Hata	2021 Formula Regional Japanese Championship
GB3 Championship	(United Kingdom) Zak O'Sullivan	2021 GB3 Championship
GB3 Championship	Teams: (United Kingdom) Carlin	2021 GB3 Championship
MotorSport Vision Formula Three Cup	(United Kingdom) Stefano Leaney	2021 MotorSport Vision Formula Three Cup
MotorSport Vision Formula Three Cup	Teams: (United Kingdom) CF Racing	2021 MotorSport Vision Formula Three Cup
Super Formula Lights	(Japan) Teppei Natori	2021 Super Formula Lights
Super Formula Lights	Teams: (Japan) TOM'S	2021 Super Formula Lights
Super Formula Lights	Masters: (Japan) Nobuhiro Imada	2021 Super Formula Lights
Toyota Racing Series	(New Zealand) Matthew Payne	2021 Toyota Racing Series
W Series	(United Kingdom) Jamie Chadwick	2021 W Series
Formula 4
ADAC Formula 4 Championship	(United Kingdom) Oliver Bearman	2021 ADAC Formula 4 Championship
ADAC Formula 4 Championship	Teams: (Netherlands) Van Amersfoort Racing	2021 ADAC Formula 4 Championship
ADAC Formula 4 Championship	Rookies: (Russia) Nikita Bedrin	2021 ADAC Formula 4 Championship
F4 Argentina Championship	(Argentina) Federico Hermida	2021 F4 Argentina Championship
F4 British Championship	(United Kingdom) Matthew Rees	2021 F4 British Championship
F4 British Championship	Teams: (United Kingdom) JHR Developments	2021 F4 British Championship
F4 British Championship	Rookies: (United Kingdom) Matthew Rees	2021 F4 British Championship
China Formula 4 Championship	(Macau) Andy Chang	2021 China Formula 4 Championship
China Formula 4 Championship	Teams: (China) Chengdu Tianfu International Circuit Team	2021 China Formula 4 Championship
F4 Danish Championship	(Denmark) Mads Hoe	2021 F4 Danish Championship
F4 Danish Championship	Formula 5: (Denmark) Mads Hoe	2021 F4 Danish Championship
French F4 Championship	(France) Esteban Masson	2021 French F4 Championship
French F4 Championship	FFSA Academy: (France) Esteban Masson	2021 French F4 Championship
French F4 Championship	Juniors: (France) Alessandro Giusti	2021 French F4 Championship
Italian F4 Championship	(United Kingdom) Oliver Bearman	2021 Italian F4 Championship
Italian F4 Championship	Teams: (Netherlands) Van Amersfoort Racing	2021 Italian F4 Championship
Italian F4 Championship	Rookies': (Russia) Nikita Bedrin	2021 Italian F4 Championship
Italian F4 Championship	Women's: (Spain) Maya Weug	2021 Italian F4 Championship
F4 Japanese Championship	(Japan) Seita Nonaka	2021 F4 Japanese Championship
F4 Japanese Championship	Independent: (Japan) "Hirobon"	2021 F4 Japanese Championship
F4 Spanish Championship	(Netherlands) Dilano van 't Hoff	2021 F4 Spanish Championship
F4 Spanish Championship	Teams: (Netherlands) MP Motorsport	2021 F4 Spanish Championship
F4 Spanish Championship	Rookies': (Netherlands) Dilano van 't Hoff	2021 F4 Spanish Championship
Formula 4 UAE Championship	(Italy) Enzo Trulli	2021 Formula 4 UAE Championship
Formula 4 UAE Championship	Teams: (United Arab Emirates) Xcel Motorsport	2021 Formula 4 UAE Championship
Formula 4 United States Championship	(Mexico) Noel León	2021 Formula 4 United States Championship
Formula 4 United States Championship	Teams: (United States) Velocity Racing Development	2021 Formula 4 United States Championship
JAF Japan Formula 4	(Japan) Yūya Motojima	2021 JAF Japan Formula 4
Formula Ford
Australian Formula Ford Championship	(Australia) Tom Sargent	2021 Australian Formula Ford Championship
F1600 Championship Series	(United States) Nicholas d'Orlando	2021 F1600 Championship Series
F2000 Championship Series	(United States) Trent Walko	2021 F2000 Championship Series
Pacific F2000 Championship	(United States) Robert Armington	2021 Pacific F2000 Championship
New Zealand Formula Ford Championship	(New Zealand) James Penrose	2020–21 New Zealand Formula Ford Championship
Toyo Tires F1600 Championship Series	(Canada) Nick Gilkes	2021 Toyo Tires F1600 Championship Series
U.S. F2000 National Championship	(Brazil) Kiko Porto	2021 U.S. F2000 National Championship

== Rally ==
Series	Champion	refer
FIA World Rally Championship	(France) Sébastien Ogier	2021 World Rally Championship
FIA World Rally Championship	Co-drivers: (France) Julien Ingrassia	2021 World Rally Championship
FIA World Rally Championship	Manufacturers: (Japan) Toyota Gazoo Racing WRT	2021 World Rally Championship
FIA World Rally Championship-2	(Norway) Andreas Mikkelsen	2021 World Rally Championship-2
FIA World Rally Championship-2	Co-drivers: (Norway) Torstein Eriksen	2021 World Rally Championship-2
FIA World Rally Championship-2	Teams: (Italy) Movisport	2021 World Rally Championship-2
FIA World Rally Championship-3	(France) Yohan Rossel	2021 World Rally Championship-3
FIA World Rally Championship-3	Co-drivers: (Poland) Maciej Szczepaniak	2021 World Rally Championship-3
FIA Junior World Rally Championship	(Finland) Sami Pajari	2021 Junior World Rally Championship
FIA Junior World Rally Championship	Co-drivers: (Finland) Marko Salminen	2021 Junior World Rally Championship
FIA Junior World Rally Championship	Teams: Finland	2021 Junior World Rally Championship
African Rally Championship	(Kenya) Carl Tundo	2021 African Rally Championship
African Rally Championship	Co-Drivers: (Kenya) Tim Jessop	2021 African Rally Championship
Andros Trophy	Élite Pro: (France) Jean-Baptiste Dubourg	2020-21 Andros Trophy
Andros Trophy	Teams: (France) DA Racing	2020-21 Andros Trophy
Andros Trophy	Élite: (France) Sylvain Pussier	2020-21 Andros Trophy
Andros Trophy	AMV Cup: (France) Vivien Gonnet	2020-21 Andros Trophy
Australian Rally Championship	(Australia) Harry Bates	2021 Australian Rally Championship
Australian Rally Championship	Co-Drivers: (Australia) John McCarthy	2021 Australian Rally Championship
British Rally Championship	(United Kingdom) Matt Edwards	2021 British Rally Championship
British Rally Championship	Co-drivers: (United Kingdom) Darren Garrod	2021 British Rally Championship
Canadian Rally Championship	(Canada) André Leblanc	2021 Canadian Rally Championship
Canadian Rally Championship	Co-Drivers: (Canada) René Leblanc	2021 Canadian Rally Championship
Central European Zone Rally Championship	Class 2: (Czech Republic) Jan Kopecký; Class 2: (Slovenia) Rok Turk	2021 Central European Zone Rally Championship
Central European Zone Rally Championship	Production: (Slovakia) Tomáš Kukučka	2021 Central European Zone Rally Championship
Central European Zone Rally Championship	2WD: (Czech Republic) René Dohnal	2021 Central European Zone Rally Championship
Central European Zone Rally Championship	Historic: (Italy) Paolo Pasutti	2021 Central European Zone Rally Championship
Czech Rally Championship	(Czech Republic) Jan Kopecký	2021 Czech Rally Championship
Czech Rally Championship	Co-Drivers: (Czech Republic) Jan Hloušek	2021 Czech Rally Championship
Deutsche Rallye Meisterschaft	(Germany) Marijan Griebel	
Estonian Rally Championship	(Estonia) Georg Gross	2021 Estonian Rally Championship
Estonian Rally Championship	Co-Drivers: (Estonia) Raigo Mõlder	2021 Estonian Rally Championship
European Rally Championship	(Norway) Andreas Mikkelsen	2021 European Rally Championship
European Rally Championship	Teams: (Germany) Toksport World Rally Team	2021 European Rally Championship
European Rally Championship	ERC-2: (Spain) Javier Pardo	2021 European Rally Championship
European Rally Championship	ERC-3: (France) Jean-Baptiste Franceschi	2021 European Rally Championship
European Rally Championship	ERC Junior: (Estonia) Ken Torn	2021 European Rally Championship
European Rally Championship	ERC-3 Junior: (France) Jean-Baptiste Franceschi	2021 European Rally Championship
European Rally Championship	Abarth Rally Cup: (Poland) Dariusz Poloński	2021 European Rally Championship
European Rally Championship	Clio Trophy: (Italy) Andrea Mabellini	2021 European Rally Championship
French Rally Championship	(France) Yoann Bonato	
Hungarian Rally Championship	(Hungary) András Hadik	
Hungarian Rally Championship	Co-Drivers: (Hungary) Krisztián Kertész	
Indian National Rally Championship	(India) Aditya Thakur	
Indian National Rally Championship	Co-Drivers: (India) Virender Kashyap	
Italian Rally Championship	(Italy) Giandomenico Basso	
Italian Rally Championship	Co-Drivers: (Italy) Lorenzo Granai	
Italian Rally Championship	Manufacturers: (Czech Republic) Škoda	
Middle East Rally Championship	(Qatar) Nasser Al-Attiyah	
NACAM Rally Championship	(Mexico) Ricardo Cordero Jr.	
New Zealand Rally Championship	(New Zealand) Hayden Paddon	2021 New Zealand Rally Championship
New Zealand Rally Championship	Co-Drivers: (New Zealand) John Kennard	2021 New Zealand Rally Championship
Polish Rally Championship	(Poland) Mikołaj Marczyk	
Romanian Rally Championship	(Romania) Simone Tempestini	
Scottish Rally Championship	(United Kingdom) Garry Pearson	2021 Scottish Rally Championship
Scottish Rally Championship	Co-drivers: (United Kingdom) Niall Burns	2021 Scottish Rally Championship
Slovak Rally Championship	(Poland) Grzegorz Grzyb	
Slovak Rally Championship	Co-Drivers: (Poland) Michał Poradzisz	
South African National Rally Championship	(South Africa) Theuns Joubert	
South African National Rally Championship	Co-Drivers: (South Africa) Schalk Van Heerden	
Spanish Rally Championship	(Spain) Óscar Palacio	
Spanish Rally Championship	Co-Drivers: (Spain) Alberto Iglesias	

=== Rally raid ===
Series	Champion	refer
FIA World Cup for Cross-Country Bajas	(Saudi Arabia) Yazeed Al Rajhi	2021 FIA World Cup for Cross-Country Bajas
FIA World Cup for Cross-Country Bajas	Co-drivers: (Russia) Alexey Kuzmich	2021 FIA World Cup for Cross-Country Bajas
FIA World Cup for Cross-Country Bajas	Teams: (Belgium) Overdrive SA	2021 FIA World Cup for Cross-Country Bajas
FIA World Cup for Cross-Country Bajas	T3: (Saudi Arabia) Dania Saud Akeel	2021 FIA World Cup for Cross-Country Bajas
FIA World Cup for Cross-Country Bajas	T4: (Portugal) Alexandre Re	2021 FIA World Cup for Cross-Country Bajas
FIA World Cup for Cross-Country Bajas	T4 Teams: (Germany) South Racing	2021 FIA World Cup for Cross-Country Bajas
FIM Bajas World Cup	(Czech Republic) Martin Michek	2021 FIM Bajas World Cup
FIM Bajas World Cup	Manufacturers: (Austria) KTM	2021 FIM Bajas World Cup
FIM Bajas World Cup	Quads: (Saudi Arabia) Haitham Al-Tuwayjiri	2021 FIM Bajas World Cup
FIM Bajas World Cup	Women: (Netherlands) Mirjam Pol	2021 FIM Bajas World Cup
FIM Bajas World Cup	Junior: (Poland) Konrad Dąbrowski	2021 FIM Bajas World Cup
FIM Bajas World Cup	Veteran: (Portugal) Pedro Bianchi Prata	2021 FIM Bajas World Cup
FIM Bajas World Cup	SSV: (Portugal) Alexandre Pinto	2021 FIM Bajas World Cup
FIM Cross-Country Rallies World Championship	(Austria) Matthias Walkner	2021 FIM Cross-Country Rallies World Championship
FIM Cross-Country Rallies World Championship	Manufacturers: (Austria) KTM	2021 FIM Cross-Country Rallies World Championship
FIM Cross-Country Rallies World Championship	Women: (Russia) Anastasiya Nifontova	2021 FIM Cross-Country Rallies World Championship
FIM Cross-Country Rallies World Championship	Juniors: (Poland) Konrad Dąbrowski	2021 FIM Cross-Country Rallies World Championship
FIM Cross-Country Rallies World Championship	Veterans: (United Kingdom) David McBride	2021 FIM Cross-Country Rallies World Championship
FIM Cross-Country Rallies World Championship	Rally2: (Italy) Carlo Cabini	2021 FIM Cross-Country Rallies World Championship
FIM Cross-Country Rallies World Championship	Quads: (Argentina) Manuel Andújar	2021 FIM Cross-Country Rallies World Championship
FIM Cross-Country Rallies World Championship	SSV: (Brazil) Leandro Torres; SSV: (Brazil) Joaõ Arena	2021 FIM Cross-Country Rallies World Championship
Dakar Rally	Cars: (France) Stéphane Peterhansel; Co-driver: (France) Edouard Boulanger	2021 Dakar Rally
Dakar Rally	Bikes: (Argentina) Kevin Benavides	2021 Dakar Rally
Dakar Rally	Light Prototypes: (Czech Republic) Josef Macháček	2021 Dakar Rally
Dakar Rally	Quads: (Argentina) Manuel Andújar	2021 Dakar Rally
Dakar Rally	UTV: (Chile) Francisco López Contardo; Co-driver: (Chile) Alvaro Quintanilla	2021 Dakar Rally
Dakar Rally	Trucks: (Russia) Dmitry Sotnikov (Russia) Ruslan Akhmadeev (Russia) Ilgiz Akhmetzianov	2021 Dakar Rally
Dakar Rally	Classics: (France) Marc Douton; Co-driver: (France) Emilien Etienne	2021 Dakar Rally

=== Rallycross ===
Series	Champion	refer
FIA World Rallycross Championship	(Sweden) Johan Kristoffersson	2021 FIA World Rallycross Championship
FIA World Rallycross Championship	Teams: (Sweden) Hansen World RX Team	2021 FIA World Rallycross Championship
FIA World Rallycross Championship	RX2e: (Belgium) Guillaume De Ridder	2021 FIA World Rallycross Championship
FIA European Rallycross Championship	RX1: (Norway) Andreas Bakkerud	2021 FIA European Rallycross Championship
FIA European Rallycross Championship	RX3: (Switzerland) Yury Belevskiy	2021 FIA European Rallycross Championship
Nitro Rallycross	Supercar: (United States) Travis Pastrana	2021 Nitro Rallycross Championship
Nitro Rallycross	NEXT: (Sweden) Casper Jansson	2021 Nitro Rallycross Championship
British Rallycross Championship	(United Kingdom) Derek Tohill	

== Sports car and GT ==
Series	Champion	refer
FIA World Endurance Championship	(United Kingdom) Mike Conway (Japan) Kamui Kobayashi (Argentina) José María López	2021 FIA World Endurance Championship
FIA World Endurance Championship	Manufacturers': (Japan) Toyota Gazoo Racing	2021 FIA World Endurance Championship
FIA World Endurance Championship	LMGTE: (United Kingdom) James Calado; LMGTE: (Italy) Alessandro Pier Guidi; LMGTE: (France) Kévin Estre	2021 FIA World Endurance Championship
FIA World Endurance Championship	LMGTE Manufacturers': (Italy) Ferrari	2021 FIA World Endurance Championship
FIA World Endurance Championship	LMP2: (Netherlands) Robin Frijns; LMP2: (Austria) Ferdinand Zvonimir von Habsburg; LMP2: (France) Charles Milesi	2021 FIA World Endurance Championship
FIA World Endurance Championship	LMP2 Teams: (Belgium) #31 Team WRT	2021 FIA World Endurance Championship
FIA World Endurance Championship	LMP2 Pro-Am: (Netherlands) Frits van Eerd	2021 FIA World Endurance Championship
FIA World Endurance Championship	LMP2 Pro-Am Teams: (Netherlands) #29 Racing Team Nederland	2021 FIA World Endurance Championship
FIA World Endurance Championship	LMGTE Am: (Denmark) Nicklas Nielsen; LMGTE Am: (France) François Perrodo; LMGTE Am: (Italy) Alessio Rovera	2021 FIA World Endurance Championship
FIA World Endurance Championship	LMGTE Am: (Italy) #83 AF Corse	2021 FIA World Endurance Championship
24H GT Series	(United States) Chandler Hull (United States) Jon Miller (Canada) Samantha Tan	2021 24H GT Series
24H GT Series	Teams: (Canada) No. 438 ST Racing	2021 24H GT Series
24H GT Series	GT3-Pro: (New Zealand) Brendon Leitch; GT3-Pro: (United States) Tyler Cooke	2021 24H GT Series
24H GT Series	GT3-Pro Teams: (Germany) No. 10 Leipert Motorsport	2021 24H GT Series
24H GT Series	GT3-Am: (Germany) Alfred Renauer	2021 24H GT Series
24H GT Series	GT3-Am Teams: (Germany) No. 91 Herberth Motorsport	2021 24H GT Series
24H GT Series	GTX: (France) Philippe Bonnel	2021 24H GT Series
24H GT Series	GTX Teams: (France) No. 701 Vortex V8	2021 24H GT Series
24H GT Series	991: (Italy) Fabrizio Broggi; 991: (Italy) Sabino de Castro; 991: (Romania) Sergiu Nicolae	2021 24H GT Series
24H GT Series	991 Teams: (Italy) No. 955 Willi Motorsport by Ebimotors	2021 24H GT Series
24H GT Series	GT4: (United States) Chandler Hull; GT4: (United States) Jon Miller; GT4: (Canada) Samantha Tan	2021 24H GT Series
24H GT Series	GT4 Teams: (Canada) No. 438 ST Racing	2021 24H GT Series
24H GT Series	Ladies: (Canada) Samantha Tan	2021 24H GT Series
24H GT Series	Juniors: (Canada) Samantha Tan	2021 24H GT Series
ADAC GT Masters	(Germany) Christopher Mies (Switzerland) Ricardo Feller	2021 ADAC GT Masters
ADAC GT Masters	Teams: (Germany) Montaplast by Land-Motorsport	2021 ADAC GT Masters
ADAC GT Masters	Junior: (Switzerland) Ricardo Feller	2021 ADAC GT Masters
ADAC GT Masters	Trophy: (Germany) Florian Spengler	2021 ADAC GT Masters
ADAC GT4 Germany	(Germany) Michael Schrey (Italy) Gabriele Piana	2021 ADAC GT4 Germany
ADAC GT4 Germany	Teams: (Germany) Team Zakspeed	2021 ADAC GT4 Germany
ADAC GT4 Germany	Junior: (France) Théo Nouet	2021 ADAC GT4 Germany
ADAC GT4 Germany	Trophy: (Luxembourg) Tom Kieffer	2021 ADAC GT4 Germany
Alpine Elf Europa Cup	(France) Jean-Baptiste Mela	2021 Alpine Elf Europa Cup
Alpine Elf Europa Cup	Gentlemen's: (France) Stéphane Auriacombe	2021 Alpine Elf Europa Cup
Asian Le Mans Series	LMP2: (Austria) Ferdinand Zvonimir von Habsburg; LMP2: (Austria) René Binder; LMP2: (China) Yifei Ye	2021 Asian Le Mans Series
Asian Le Mans Series	LMP2 Teams: (Russia) #26 G-Drive Racing	2021 Asian Le Mans Series
Asian Le Mans Series	LMP2 Am: (Greece) Andreas Laskaratos; LMP2 Am: (United States) Dwight Merriman; LMP2 Am: (United Kingdom) Kyle Tilley	2021 Asian Le Mans Series
Asian Le Mans Series	LMP2 Am Teams: (United States) #18 Era Motorsport	2021 Asian Le Mans Series
Asian Le Mans Series	LMP3: (United Kingdom) Wayne Boyd; LMP3: (Venezuela) Manuel Maldonado; LMP3: (Finland) Rory Penttinen	2021 Asian Le Mans Series
Asian Le Mans Series	LMP3 Teams: (United Kingdom) #23 United Autosports	2021 Asian Le Mans Series
Asian Le Mans Series	GT: (Germany) Ralf Bohn; GT: (Germany) Alfred Renauer; GT: (Germany) Robert Renauer	2021 Asian Le Mans Series
Asian Le Mans Series	GT Teams: (Germany) #99 Precote Herberth Motorsport	2021 Asian Le Mans Series
Asian Le Mans Series	GT Am: (Germany) Christian Hook; GT Am: (Finland) Patrick Kujala; GT Am: (Germany) Manuel Lauck	2021 Asian Le Mans Series
Asian Le Mans Series	GT Am Teams: (Germany) #66 Rinaldi Racing	2021 Asian Le Mans Series
Britcar Endurance Championship	(United Kingdom) Richard Wells (United Kingdom) Alex Kapadia (United Kingdom) Tim Gray	2021 Britcar Endurance Championship
Britcar Endurance Championship	Praga: (United Kingdom) Richard Wells; Praga: (United Kingdom) Alex Kapadia; Praga: (United Kingdom) Tim Gray	2021 Britcar Endurance Championship
Britcar Endurance Championship	Endurance: (United Kingdom) Will Powell; Endurance: (United Kingdom) David Scaramanga	2021 Britcar Endurance Championship
Britcar Endurance Championship	Class 1: (United Kingdom) Will Powell; Class 1: (United Kingdom) David Scaramanga	2021 Britcar Endurance Championship
Britcar Endurance Championship	Class 2: (United Kingdom) Lucky Khera; Class 2: (United Kingdom) Ross Wylie	2021 Britcar Endurance Championship
Britcar Endurance Championship	Class 3: (New Zealand) Dave Benett; Class 3: (United Kingdom) Marcus Fothergill	2021 Britcar Endurance Championship
Britcar Endurance Championship	Class 4: (New Zealand) Peter Erceg	2021 Britcar Endurance Championship
British GT Championship	GT3: (Denmark) Dennis Lind; GT3: (Russia) Leo Machitski	2021 British GT Championship
British GT Championship	GT3 Teams: (United Kingdom) Barwell Motorsport	2021 British GT Championship
British GT Championship	GT3 Pro-Am: (Netherlands) Yelmer Buurman; GT3 Pro-Am: (United Kingdom) Ian Loggie	2021 British GT Championship
British GT Championship	GT3 Silver Cup: (United Kingdom) Stewart Proctor; GT3 Silver Cup: (United Kingdom) Lewis Proctor	2021 British GT Championship
British GT Championship	GT4: (United Kingdom) Will Burns; GT4: (United Kingdom) Gus Burton	2021 British GT Championship
British GT Championship	GT4 Teams: (United Kingdom) Century Motorsport	2021 British GT Championship
British GT Championship	GT4 Pro-Am: (United Kingdom) Matt Topham; GT4 Pro-Am: (United Kingdom) Darren Turner	2021 British GT Championship
British GT Championship	GT4 Silver Cup: (United Kingdom) Will Burns; GT4 Silver Cup: (United Kingdom) Gustav Burton	2021 British GT Championship
Deutsche Tourenwagen Masters	(Germany) Maximilian Götz	2021 Deutsche Tourenwagen Masters
Deutsche Tourenwagen Masters	Teams: (Italy) Red Bull AlphaTauri AF Corse	2021 Deutsche Tourenwagen Masters
Deutsche Tourenwagen Masters	Manufacturers': (Germany) Mercedes-AMG	2021 Deutsche Tourenwagen Masters
DTM Trophy	(United Kingdom) Ben Green	2021 DTM Trophy
DTM Trophy	Teams: (Germany) FK Performance Motorsport	2021 DTM Trophy
DTM Trophy	Manufacturers': (Germany) BMW	2021 DTM Trophy
European Le Mans Series	LMP2: (Switzerland) Louis Delétraz; LMP2: (Poland) Robert Kubica; LMP2: (China) Yifei Ye	2021 European Le Mans Series
European Le Mans Series	LMP2 Teams: (Belgium) #41 Team WRT	2021 European Le Mans Series
European Le Mans Series	LMP2 Pro-Am: (United States) John Falb; LMP2 Pro-Am: (Angola) Rui Andrade	2021 European Le Mans Series
European Le Mans Series	LMP2 Pro-Am Teams: #25 G-Drive Racing	2021 European Le Mans Series
European Le Mans Series	LMP3: (Germany) Laurents Hörr	2021 European Le Mans Series
European Le Mans Series	LMP3 Teams: (Luxembourg) #4 DKR Engineering	2021 European Le Mans Series
European Le Mans Series	LMGTE: (Italy) Matteo Cressoni; LMGTE: (Spain) Miguel Molina; LMGTE: (Italy) Rino Mastronardi	2021 European Le Mans Series
European Le Mans Series	LMGTE Teams: (Italy) #80 Iron Lynx	2021 European Le Mans Series
Ginetta GT4 Supercup	(United Kingdom) Adam Smalley	2021 Ginetta GT4 Supercup
Ginetta GT4 Supercup	Pro-Am: (United Kingdom) Colin White	2021 Ginetta GT4 Supercup
Ginetta Junior Championship	(United Kingdom) Aston Millar	2021 Ginetta Junior Championship
GT & Prototype Challenge	(Belgium) Tom Boonen	2021 GT & Prototype Challenge
GT & Prototype Challenge	LMP3: (Germany) Max Aschoff	2021 GT & Prototype Challenge
GT & Prototype Challenge	Group CN: (Belgium) Tom Boonen	2021 GT & Prototype Challenge
GT & Prototype Challenge	SR3 - Praga: (Netherlands) Max de Bruijn; SR3 - Praga: (Netherlands) Melvin van Dam	2021 GT & Prototype Challenge
GT America Series	GT3: (United States) Charlie Luck	2021 GT America Series
GT America Series	GT3 Teams: (United States) Wright Motorsports	2021 GT America Series
GT America Series	GT2: (United States) Elias Sabo	2021 GT America Series
GT America Series	GT2 Teams: (United States) GMG Racing	2021 GT America Series
GT America Series	GT4: (United States) Jason Bell	2021 GT America Series
GT America Series	GT4 Teams: (United States) GMG Racing	2021 GT America Series
GT Winter Series	(Czech Republic) Gabriela Jílková (Germany) Robert Haub	2021 GT Winter Series
GT World Challenge America	(Italy) Andrea Caldarelli (South Africa) Jordan Pepper	2021 GT World Challenge America
GT World Challenge America	Teams: (United States) K-Pax Racing	2021 GT World Challenge America
GT World Challenge America	Pro-Am: (Belgium) Jan Heylen; Pro-Am: (United States) Fred Poordad	2021 GT World Challenge America
GT World Challenge America	Pro-Am Teams: (United States) Wright Motorsports	2021 GT World Challenge America
GT World Challenge America	Am: (United States) Conrad Grunewald; Am: (United States) Jean-Claude Saada	2021 GT World Challenge America
GT World Challenge America	Am Teams: (Italy) AF Corse	2021 GT World Challenge America
GT World Challenge Australia	Pro-Am: (Australia) Yasser Shahin	2021 GT World Challenge Australia
GT World Challenge Australia	Am: (Australia) Andrew Macpherson; Am: (Australia) Ben Porter	2021 GT World Challenge Australia
GT World Challenge Australia	Trophy: (Australia) Brad Schumacher	2021 GT World Challenge Australia
GT World Challenge Australia	GT4: (Australia) Mark Griffith	2021 GT World Challenge Australia
GT World Challenge Europe	(Belgium) Dries Vanthoor (Belgium) Charles Weerts	2021 GT World Challenge Europe
GT World Challenge Europe	Teams: (Belgium) Team WRT	2021 GT World Challenge Europe
GT World Challenge Europe	Pro-Am: (Portugal) Henrique Chaves; Pro-Am: (Portugal) Miguel Ramos	2021 GT World Challenge Europe
GT World Challenge Europe	Pro-Am Teams: (United Kingdom) Barwell Motorsport	2021 GT World Challenge Europe
GT World Challenge Europe	Silver Cup: (Switzerland) Alex Fontana	2021 GT World Challenge Europe
GT World Challenge Europe	Silver Cup Teams: (Switzerland) Emil Frey Racing	2021 GT World Challenge Europe
GT2 European Series	Pro-Am: (Denmark) Anders Fjordbach; Pro-Am: (United States) Mark Patterson	2021 GT2 European Series
GT2 European Series	Am: (Switzerland) Christoph Ulrich	2021 GT2 European Series
GT4 America Series	Silver: (United States) Kenny Murillo; Silver: (United States) Christian Szymczak	2021 GT4 America Series
GT4 America Series	Silver Teams: (United States) Murillo Racing	2021 GT4 America Series
GT4 America Series	Pro-Am: (United States) Jason Hart; Pro-Am: (United States) Matt Travis	2021 GT4 America Series
GT4 America Series	Pro-Am Teams: (United States) Nolasport	2021 GT4 America Series
GT4 America Series	Am: (United States) Kevin Conway; Am: (United States) John Geesbreght	2021 GT4 America Series
GT4 America Series	Am Teams: (United States) Smooge Racing	2021 GT4 America Series
IMSA Prototype Challenge	LMP3-1: (United States) Dakota Dickerson; LMP3-1: (United States) Josh Sarchet	2021 IMSA Prototype Challenge
IMSA Prototype Challenge	LMP3-1 Teams: (United States) #54 MLT Motorsports	2021 IMSA Prototype Challenge
IMSA Prototype Challenge	LMP3-1 Bronze: (United States) David Grant; LMP3-1 Bronze: (United States) Keith Grant	2021 IMSA Prototype Challenge
IMSA Prototype Challenge	LMP3-2: (Canada) Danny Kok; LMP3-2: (Canada) George Staikos	2021 IMSA Prototype Challenge
IMSA Prototype Challenge	LMP3-2 Teams: (Canada) #61 Conquest Racing	2021 IMSA Prototype Challenge
IMSA Prototype Challenge	LMP3-2 Bronze: (Canada) Danny Kok; LMP3-2 Bronze: (Canada) George Staikos	2021 IMSA Prototype Challenge
IMSA SportsCar Championship	DPi: (Brazil) Pipo Derani; DPi: (Brazil) Felipe Nasr	2021 IMSA SportsCar Championship
IMSA SportsCar Championship	DPi Teams: (United States) #31 Whelen Engineering Racing	2021 IMSA SportsCar Championship
IMSA SportsCar Championship	DPi Manufacturers: (United States) Cadillac	2021 IMSA SportsCar Championship
IMSA SportsCar Championship	LMP2: (Denmark) Mikkel Jensen; LMP2: (United States) Ben Keating	2021 IMSA SportsCar Championship
IMSA SportsCar Championship	LMP2 Teams: (United States) #52 PR1/Mathiasen Motorsports	2021 IMSA SportsCar Championship
IMSA SportsCar Championship	LMP3: (United States) Gar Robinson	2021 IMSA SportsCar Championship
IMSA SportsCar Championship	LMP3 Teams: (United States) #74 Riley Motorsports	2021 IMSA SportsCar Championship
IMSA SportsCar Championship	GTLM: (Spain) Antonio García; GTLM: (United States) Jordan Taylor	2021 IMSA SportsCar Championship
IMSA SportsCar Championship	GTLM Teams: (United States) #3 Corvette Racing	2021 IMSA SportsCar Championship
IMSA SportsCar Championship	GTLM Manufacturers: (United States) Chevrolet	2021 IMSA SportsCar Championship
IMSA SportsCar Championship	GTD: (Canada) Zacharie Robichon; GTLM: (Belgium) Laurens Vanthoor	2021 IMSA SportsCar Championship
IMSA SportsCar Championship	GTD Teams: (Canada) #9 Pfaff Motorsports	2021 IMSA SportsCar Championship
IMSA SportsCar Championship	GTD Manufacturers: (Germany) Porsche	2021 IMSA SportsCar Championship
Italian GT Championship (Endurance)	GT3: (Italy) Mattia Drudi; GT3: (Italy) Riccardo Agostini; GT3: (Italy) Lorenzo Ferrari	2021 Italian GT Championship
Italian GT Championship (Endurance)	GT3 Teams: (San Marino) No.12 Audi Sport Italia	2021 Italian GT Championship
Italian GT Championship (Endurance)	GT3 Constructors: (Italy) Ferrari	2021 Italian GT Championship
Italian GT Championship (Endurance)	GT3 Pro-Am: (United States) Simon Mann	2021 Italian GT Championship
Italian GT Championship (Endurance)	GT3 Am: (Italy) Luca Magnoni	2021 Italian GT Championship
Italian GT Championship (Endurance)	GT Cup: (Italy) Luca Demarchi	2021 Italian GT Championship
Italian GT Championship (Endurance)	GT4 Am: (Italy) Nicola Neri	2021 Italian GT Championship
Italian GT Championship (Sprint)		2021 Italian GT Championship
Italian GT Championship (Sprint)	GT3: (Italy) Riccardo Agostini; GT3: (Italy) Lorenzo Ferrari	2021 Italian GT Championship
Italian GT Championship (Sprint)	GT3 Teams: (San Marino) No.12 Audi Sport Italia	2021 Italian GT Championship
Italian GT Championship (Sprint)	GT3 Constructors: (Italy) Ferrari	2021 Italian GT Championship
Italian GT Championship (Sprint)	GT3 Pro-Am: (United States) Simon Mann	2021 Italian GT Championship
Italian GT Championship (Sprint)	GT3 Am: (Turkey) Murat Cuhadaroglu	2021 Italian GT Championship
Italian GT Championship (Sprint)	GT Cup: (Italy) Francesca Linossi	2021 Italian GT Championship
Italian GT Championship (Sprint)	GT4 Pro-Am: (Italy) Mattia di Giusto	2021 Italian GT Championship
Italian GT Championship (Sprint)	GT4 Am: (Italy) Diego di Fabio	2021 Italian GT Championship
Masters Endurance Legends USA	Proto Historic: (United States) Cal Meeker	2021 Masters Endurance Legends USA
Masters Endurance Legends USA	Proto 1: (United States) Franceso Melandri	2021 Masters Endurance Legends USA
Masters Endurance Legends USA	Proto 2: (United States) Spencer Trenery	2021 Masters Endurance Legends USA
Masters Endurance Legends USA	Proto 3: (United States) Danny Baker	2021 Masters Endurance Legends USA
Masters Endurance Legends USA	Proto 4: (United States) Travis Engen	2021 Masters Endurance Legends USA
Masters Endurance Legends USA	GT1-3: (United States) Tom Mueller	2021 Masters Endurance Legends USA
Masters Endurance Legends USA	GT2-2: (United States) Loren Beggs	2021 Masters Endurance Legends USA
Masters Endurance Legends USA	GT2-3: (United States) Connor De Phillippi; GT2-3: (United States) Thomas Plucinsky	2021 Masters Endurance Legends USA
Masters Endurance Legends USA	GT3-1: (United States) Scooter Gabel	2021 Masters Endurance Legends USA
Masters Endurance Legends USA	GT3-2: (United States) Edward Hugo	2021 Masters Endurance Legends USA
Masters Endurance Legends USA	GT3-3: (United States) David Roberts	2021 Masters Endurance Legends USA
Mazda MX-5 Cup	(United States) Gresham Wagner	2021 Mazda MX-5 Cup
Mazda MX-5 Cup	Teams: (United States) Spark Performance	2021 Mazda MX-5 Cup
Mazda MX-5 Cup	Rookies: (United States) Sam Paley	2021 Mazda MX-5 Cup
Michelin Pilot Challenge	GS: (Belgium) Jan Heylen	2021 Michelin Pilot Challenge
Michelin Pilot Challenge	GS Teams: (United States) #16 Wright Motorsports	2021 Michelin Pilot Challenge
Michelin Pilot Challenge	GS Manufacturers: (Germany) Porsche	2021 Michelin Pilot Challenge
Michelin Pilot Challenge	TCR: (United States) Michael Lewis; TCR: (United States) Taylor Hagler	2021 Michelin Pilot Challenge
Michelin Pilot Challenge	TCR Teams: (United States) #77 Bryan Herta Autosport with Curb-Agajanian	2021 Michelin Pilot Challenge
Michelin Pilot Challenge	TCR Manufacturers: (South Korea) Hyundai	2021 Michelin Pilot Challenge
Super GT Series	GT500: (Japan) Yuhi Sekiguchi; GT500: (Japan) Sho Tsuboi	2021 Super GT Series
Super GT Series	GT300: (Japan) Takuto Iguchi; GT300: (Japan) Hideki Yamauchi	2021 Super GT Series
Supercar Challenge	(Netherlands) Dennis de Borst (Netherlands) Stan van Oord	2021 Supercar Challenge
Supercar Challenge	GT: (Netherlands) Bob Herber	2021 Supercar Challenge
Supercar Challenge	Supersport 1: (Netherlands) Dennis de Borst; Supersport 1: (Netherlands) Stan van Oord	2021 Supercar Challenge
Supercar Challenge	Supersport 2: (United Kingdom) Jerome Greenhalgh; Supersport 2: (United Kingdom) Robin Greenhalgh	2021 Supercar Challenge
Supercar Challenge	Sport: (Netherlands) Pieter de Jong; Sport: (Netherlands) Jack Hoekstra	2021 Supercar Challenge
Trans-Am Series	TA: (United States) Chris Dyson	2021 Trans-Am Series
Trans-Am Series	TA Pro-Am: (Panama) Oscar Teran	2021 Trans-Am Series
Trans-Am Series	TA Manufacturers: (United States) Ford	2021 Trans-Am Series
Trans-Am Series	TA2: (Brazil) Raphael Matos	2021 Trans-Am Series
Trans-Am Series	TA2 Pro-Am: (United States) Sam Mayer	2021 Trans-Am Series
Trans-Am Series	TA2 Manufacturers: (United States) Ford	2021 Trans-Am Series
Trans-Am Series	XGT: (United States) Erich Joiner	2021 Trans-Am Series
Trans-Am Series	XGT Manufacturers: (Germany) Porsche	2021 Trans-Am Series
Trans-Am Series	SGT: (United States) Justin Oakes	2021 Trans-Am Series
Trans-Am Series	SGT Pro-Am: (United States) Natalie Decker	2021 Trans-Am Series
Trans-Am Series	SGT Manufacturers: (United States) Chevrolet	2021 Trans-Am Series
Trans-Am Series	GT: (United States) Philip Di Pippo	2021 Trans-Am Series
Trans-Am Series	GT Pro-Am: (United States) Jason Merck	2021 Trans-Am Series
Trans-Am Series	GT Manufacturers: (United States) Ford	2021 Trans-Am Series
Trans-Am Series (West Coast)	TA: (United States) Steve Goldman	2021 Trans-Am Series
Trans-Am Series (West Coast)	TA Manufacturers: (United States) Chevrolet	2021 Trans-Am Series
Trans-Am Series (West Coast)	TA2: (United States) Carl Rydquist	2021 Trans-Am Series
Trans-Am Series (West Coast)	TA2 Manufacturers: (United States) Ford	2021 Trans-Am Series
Trans-Am Series (West Coast)	XGT: (United States) Erich Joiner	2021 Trans-Am Series
Trans-Am Series (West Coast)	XGT Manufacturers: (Germany) Porsche	2021 Trans-Am Series
Trans-Am Series (West Coast)	SGT: (United States) John Schweitzer	2021 Trans-Am Series
Trans-Am Series (West Coast)	SGT Manufacturers: (United States) Dodge	2021 Trans-Am Series
Porsche Supercup, Porsche Carrera Cup, GT3 Cup Challenge and Porsche Sprint Challenge
Porsche Supercup	(Netherlands) Larry ten Voorde	2021 Porsche Supercup
Porsche Supercup	Teams: (Netherlands) Team GP Elite	2021 Porsche Supercup
Porsche Supercup	Pro-Am: (Germany) Laurin Heinrich	2021 Porsche Supercup
Porsche Supercup	Am: (Monaco) Nicolas Misslin	2021 Porsche Supercup
Porsche Carrera Cup Germany	(Netherlands) Larry ten Voorde	2021 Porsche Carrera Cup Germany
Porsche Carrera Cup Germany	Teams: (Netherlands) Team GP Elite	2021 Porsche Carrera Cup Germany
Porsche Carrera Cup Germany	Pro-Am: (Luxembourg) Carlos Rivas	2021 Porsche Carrera Cup Germany
Porsche Carrera Cup Germany	Rookie: (Netherlands) Loek Hartog	2021 Porsche Carrera Cup Germany
Porsche Carrera Cup Great Britain	(United Kingdom) Dan Cammish	2021 Porsche Carrera Cup Great Britain
Porsche Carrera Cup Great Britain	Pro-Am: (United Kingdom) Ryan Ratcliffe	2021 Porsche Carrera Cup Great Britain
Porsche Carrera Cup Great Britain	Am: (United Kingdom) Justin Sherwood	2021 Porsche Carrera Cup Great Britain
Porsche Carrera Cup Italia	(Italy) Alberto Cerqui	2021 Porsche Carrera Cup Italia
Porsche Carrera Cup Italia	Teams: (Italy) Dinamic Motorsport	2021 Porsche Carrera Cup Italia
Porsche Carrera Cup Italia	Michelin Cup: (Italy) Marco Cassara	2021 Porsche Carrera Cup Italia
Porsche Carrera Cup Italia	Silver Cup: (Italy) Massimiliano Montagnese	2021 Porsche Carrera Cup Italia
Porsche Carrera Cup North America	(United Kingdom) Sebastian Priaulx	2021 Porsche Carrera Cup North America

== Stock car racing ==
Series	Champion	refer
NASCAR Cup Series	(United States) Kyle Larson	2021 NASCAR Cup Series
NASCAR Cup Series	Manufacturers: (United States) Chevrolet	2021 NASCAR Cup Series
NASCAR Xfinity Series	(United States) Daniel Hemric	2021 NASCAR Xfinity Series
NASCAR Xfinity Series	Manufacturers: (United States) Chevrolet	2021 NASCAR Xfinity Series
NASCAR Camping World Truck Series	(United States) Ben Rhodes	2021 NASCAR Camping World Truck Series
NASCAR Camping World Truck Series	Manufacturers: (Japan) Toyota	2021 NASCAR Camping World Truck Series
NASCAR PEAK Mexico Series	(Mexico) Salvador de Alba	2021 NASCAR PEAK Mexico Series
NASCAR Pinty's Series	(Canada) Louis-Philippe Dumoulin	2021 NASCAR Pinty's Series
NASCAR Pinty's Series	Manufacturers: (United States) Dodge	2021 NASCAR Pinty's Series
NASCAR Whelen Modified Tour	(United States) Justin Bonsignore	2021 NASCAR Whelen Modified Tour
NASCAR Whelen Euro Series	(Netherlands) Loris Hezemans	2021 NASCAR Whelen Euro Series
NASCAR Whelen Euro Series	EuroNASCAR 2: (Czech Republic) Martin Doubek	2021 NASCAR Whelen Euro Series
ARCA Menards Series	(United States) Ty Gibbs	2021 ARCA Menards Series
ARCA Menards Series East	(United States) Sammy Smith	2021 ARCA Menards Series East
ARCA Menards Series West	(United States) Jesse Love	2021 ARCA Menards Series West
Turismo Carretera	(Argentina) Mariano Werner	2021 Turismo Carretera

== Touring cars ==
Series	Champion	refer
British Touring Car Championship	(United Kingdom) Ashley Sutton	2021 British Touring Car Championship
British Touring Car Championship	Teams: (United Kingdom) Laser Tools Racing	2021 British Touring Car Championship
British Touring Car Championship	Manufacturers: (Germany) BMW	2021 British Touring Car Championship
British Touring Car Championship	Independents: (United Kingdom) Ashley Sutton	2021 British Touring Car Championship
British Touring Car Championship	Independents Teams: (United Kingdom) Laser Tools Racing	2021 British Touring Car Championship
British Touring Car Championship	Jack Sears Trophy: (United Kingdom) Daniel Rowbottom	2021 British Touring Car Championship
24H TCE Series	(Norway) Emil Heyerdahl (Austria) Constantin Kletzer	2021 24H TCE Series
24H TCE Series	Teams: (Switzerland) No. 1 Autorama Motorsport by Wolf-Power Racing	2021 24H TCE Series
24H TCE Series	TCR: (Norway) Emil Heyerdahl; TCR: (Austria) Constantin Kletzer	2021 24H TCE Series
24H TCE Series	TCR Teams: (Switzerland) No. 1 Autorama Motorsport by Wolf-Power Racing	2021 24H TCE Series
24H TCE Series	TCX: (United States) Jean-Francois Brunot; TCX: (United Kingdom) Colin White	2021 24H TCE Series
24H TCE Series	TCX Teams: (United Kingdom) No. 278 CWS Engineering	2021 24H TCE Series
24H TCE Series	TC: (Lithuania) Julius Adomavičius; TC: (United Kingdom) John Corbett; TC: (United Kingdom) George King; TC: (Germany) Simon Klemund; TC: (United Kingdom) James Winslow	2021 24H TCE Series
24H TCE Series	TC Teams: (Germany) No. 302 fun-M Motorsport	2021 24H TCE Series
24H TCE Series	Ladies: (Switzerland) Jasmin Preisig	2021 24H TCE Series
24H TCE Series	Juniors: (Norway) Emil Heyerdahl	2021 24H TCE Series
ADAC TCR Germany Touring Car Championship	(Germany) Luca Engstler	2021 ADAC TCR Germany Touring Car Championship
ADAC TCR Germany Touring Car Championship	Teams: (Germany) Hyundai Team Engstler	2021 ADAC TCR Germany Touring Car Championship
ADAC TCR Germany Touring Car Championship	Junior: (Austria) Nico Gruber	2021 ADAC TCR Germany Touring Car Championship
ADAC TCR Germany Touring Car Championship	Trophy: (Germany) Roland Hertner	2021 ADAC TCR Germany Touring Car Championship
Pure ETCR Championship	(Sweden) Mattias Ekström	2021 Pure ETCR Championship
Pure ETCR Championship	Manufacturers': (Hungary) Cupra X Zengő Motorsport	2021 Pure ETCR Championship
Russian Circuit Racing Series	TCR: (Russia) Kirill Ladygin	2021 Russian Circuit Racing Series
Russian Circuit Racing Series	TCR Teams: (Russia) LADA Sport Rosneft	2021 Russian Circuit Racing Series
Russian Circuit Racing Series	Super Production: (Russia) Vadim Antipov	2021 Russian Circuit Racing Series
Russian Circuit Racing Series	Super Production Teams: (Russia) Sofit Racing Team	2021 Russian Circuit Racing Series
Russian Circuit Racing Series	Touring Light: (Russia) Ivan Chubarov	2021 Russian Circuit Racing Series
Russian Circuit Racing Series	Touring Light Teams: (Russia) LADA Sport Rosneft	2021 Russian Circuit Racing Series
Russian Circuit Racing Series	S1600: (Russia) Egor Sanin	2021 Russian Circuit Racing Series
Russian Circuit Racing Series	S1600 Teams: (Russia) Innostage AG Team	2021 Russian Circuit Racing Series
Russian Circuit Racing Series	S1600 Junior: (Russia) Artem Antonov	2021 Russian Circuit Racing Series
Russian Circuit Racing Series	S1600 Junior Teams: (Russia) Rumos Racing	2021 Russian Circuit Racing Series
Russian Circuit Racing Series	GT4: (Russia) Denis Remenyako	2021 Russian Circuit Racing Series
Russian Circuit Racing Series	GT4 Teams: (Russia) Capital Racing Team MotorSharks	2021 Russian Circuit Racing Series
Spanish Touring Car Championship	(Spain) Félix Aparicio	2021 Campeonato de España de Turismos Series
Stock Car Brasil	(Brazil) Gabriel Casagrande	2021 Stock Car Brasil Championship
Stock Car Brasil	Teams: (Brazil) Eurofarma RC	2021 Stock Car Brasil Championship
Stock Car Brasil	Manufacturers: (United States) Chevrolet	2021 Stock Car Brasil Championship
Supercars Championship	(New Zealand) Shane van Gisbergen	2021 Supercars Championship
Supercars Championship	Teams: (Australia) Triple Eight Race Engineering	2021 Supercars Championship
Supercars Championship	Manufacturers: (Australia) Holden	2021 Supercars Championship
Super2 Series	(Australia) Broc Feeney	2021 Super2 Series
Super2 Series	Super3: (Australia) Nash Morris	2021 Super2 Series
Súper TC 2000	(Argentina) Agustín Canapino	2021 Súper TC 2000
Súper TC 2000	Teams: (Argentina) Toyota Gazoo Racing YPF Infinia	2021 Súper TC 2000
Súper TC 2000	Manufacturers: (United States) Chevrolet	2021 Súper TC 2000
TC America Series	(United States) Jacob Ruud	2021 TC America Series
TC America Series	Teams: (United States) Classic BMW	2021 TC America Series
TC America Series	TC: (United States) Eric Powell	2021 TC America Series
TC America Series	TC Teams: (United States) Auto Technic Racing	2021 TC America Series
TC America Series	TCA: (United States) Caleb Bacon	2021 TC America Series
TC America Series	TCA Teams: (United States) Forbush Performance	2021 TC America Series
TCR Asia Series	(China) Jason Zhang	2021 TCR Asia Series
TCR Asia Series	Teams: (China) Shell Teamwork Lynk & Co Racing	2021 TCR Asia Series
TCR China Touring Car Championship	(Macau) Rodolfo Ávila	2021 TCR China Touring Car Championship
TCR China Touring Car Championship	Teams: (China) Team MG XPower	2021 TCR China Touring Car Championship
TCR Denmark Touring Car Series	(Denmark) Kasper H. Jensen	2021 TCR Denmark Touring Car Series
TCR Denmark Touring Car Series	Teams: (Denmark) LM Racing	2021 TCR Denmark Touring Car Series
TCR Denmark Touring Car Series	Trophy: (Denmark) Michael Carlsen	2021 TCR Denmark Touring Car Series
TCR Denmark Touring Car Series	Under 23: (Denmark) Gustav Birch	2021 TCR Denmark Touring Car Series
TCR Eastern Europe Trophy	(Czech Republic) Michal Makeš	2021 TCR Eastern Europe Trophy
TCR Eastern Europe Trophy	Teams: (Czech Republic) Fullín Race Academy	2021 TCR Eastern Europe Trophy
TCR Eastern Europe Trophy	Juniors: (Czech Republic) Michal Makeš	2021 TCR Eastern Europe Trophy
TCR Europe Touring Car Series	(Spain) Mikel Azcona	2021 TCR Europe Touring Car Series
TCR Europe Touring Car Series	Teams: (France) Sébastien Loeb Racing	2021 TCR Europe Touring Car Series
TCR Italy Touring Car Championship	(Finland) Antti Buri	2021 TCR Italy Touring Car Championship
TCR Italy Touring Car Championship	Teams: (Italy) Target Competition	2021 TCR Italy Touring Car Championship
TCR Japan Touring Car Series	Saturday Series: (Japan) 'Hirobon'	2021 TCR Japan Touring Car Series
TCR Japan Touring Car Series	Sunday Series: (Japan) 'Hirobon'	2021 TCR Japan Touring Car Series
TCR Japan Touring Car Series	Teams: (Japan) Birth Racing Project	2021 TCR Japan Touring Car Series
TCR New Zealand Touring Car Championship	(New Zealand) Chris van der Drift	2021 TCR New Zealand Touring Car Championship
STCC TCR Scandinavia Touring Car Championship	(Sweden) Robert Dahlgren	2021 STCC TCR Scandinavia Touring Car Championship
Touring Car Trophy	(United Kingdom) Lewis Kent	2021 Touring Car Trophy
UAE Touring Car Championship	Ferrari Challenge: (United Kingdom) Paul Sebright	2020-21 UAE Touring Car Championship
UAE Touring Car Championship	Clio Cup: (United Arab Emirates) Ahmad Al Moosa	2020-21 UAE Touring Car Championship
UAE Touring Car Championship	TCR Class: (Greece) Alex Annivas	2020-21 UAE Touring Car Championship
UAE Touring Car Championship	AE86: (United States) Scott Dimeler	2020-21 UAE Touring Car Championship
UAE Touring Car Championship	Class 2: (United Kingdom) Ricky Coomber; Class 2: (Republic of Ireland) Jonathan Mullan	2020-21 UAE Touring Car Championship

== Truck racing ==
Series	Champion	refer
Boost Mobile Super Trucks	(Australia) Paul Morris	2021 Boost Mobile Super Trucks
Copa Truck	(Brazil) André Marques	2021 Copa Truck season
Copa Truck	Super Truck: (Brazil) Felipe Tozzo	2021 Copa Truck season
FIA European Truck Racing Championship	(Hungary) Norbert Kiss	2021 European Truck Racing Championship
FIA European Truck Racing Championship	Grammer Truck Cup: (United Kingdom) Shane Brereton	2021 European Truck Racing Championship
Stadium Super Trucks	(Australia) Matthew Brabham	2021 Stadium Super Trucks
SuperUtes Series	(Australia) Ryal Harris	2021 SuperUtes Series
