= List of 2020 motorsport champions =

2020 motorsport champions
Previous: 2019	Next: 2021

This list of 2020 motorsport champions is a list of national or international motorsport series with championships decided by the points or positions earned by a driver from multiple races where the season was completed during the 2020 calendar year.

The COVID-19 pandemic caused disruption to motorsport across the world during the year, resulting in mass changes across most championships, and some even being outright cancelled.

== Dirt oval racing ==
Series	Champion	Refer
Lucas Oil Late Model Dirt Series	(United States) Jimmy Owens	2020 Lucas Oil Late Model Dirt Series
World of Outlaws Late Model Series	(United States) Brandon Sheppard	
World of Outlaws Sprint Car Series	(United States) Brad Sweet	
World of Outlaws Sprint Car Series	Teams: (United States) Kasey Kahne Racing	

== Drag racing ==
Series	Champion	refer
NHRA Drag Racing Series	Top Fuel: (United States) Steve Torrence	2020 NHRA Drag Racing Series
NHRA Drag Racing Series	Funny Car: (United States) Matt Hagan	2020 NHRA Drag Racing Series
NHRA Drag Racing Series	Pro Stock: (United States) Erica Enders-Stevens	2020 NHRA Drag Racing Series
NHRA Drag Racing Series	Pro Stock Motorcycle: (United States) Matt Smith	2020 NHRA Drag Racing Series

== Drifting ==
Series	Champion	refer
British Drift Championship	(United Kingdom) Duane McKeever	2020 British Drift Championship
D1 Grand Prix	(Japan) Masanori Kohashi	2020 D1 Grand Prix series
D1 Grand Prix	D1 Lights: (Japan) Kojiro Mekuwa	2020 D1 Grand Prix series
D1NZ	(New Zealand) Liam Burke	2020 D1NZ season
D1NZ	Pro-Sport: (New Zealand) Russell Vare	2020 D1NZ season
Drift Masters	(Republic of Ireland) James Deane	2020 Drift Masters
Formula D	(United States) Vaughn Gittin Jr.	2020 Formula D season
Formula D	PROSPEC: (Belarus) Dmitriy Brutskiy	2020 Formula D season
Formula D	Manufacturers: (United States) Ford	2020 Formula D season
Formula D	Tire Cup: (Japan) Nitto	2020 Formula D season
Formula DRIFT Japan	(Japan) Kouichi Yamashita	2020 Formula DRIFT Japan

== Karting ==
Series	Driver	Season article
CIK-FIA Karting World Championship	OK: (United Kingdom) Callum Bradshaw	
CIK-FIA Karting World Championship	OKJ: (United Kingdom) Freddie Slater	
CIK-FIA Karting World Championship	KZ: (France) Jérémy Iglesias	
CIK-FIA Karting World Championship	KZ2: (Italy) Simone Cunati	
CIK-FIA Karting Academy Trophy	(United States) Connor Zilisch	2020 CIK-FIA Karting Academy Trophy
CIK-FIA Karting European Championship	OK: (Italy) Andrea Kimi Antonelli	
CIK-FIA Karting European Championship	OK-J: (United States) Ugo Ugochukwu	
CIK-FIA Karting European Championship	KZ: (Netherlands) Marijn Kremers	
CIK-FIA Karting European Championship	KZ2: (Sweden) Viktor Gustavsson	
WSK Champions Cup	OK: (United Kingdom) Taylor Barnard	
WSK Champions Cup	OKJ: (Italy) Alfio Spina	
WSK Champions Cup	60 Mini: (Russia) Anatoly Khavalkin	
WSK Euro Series	KZ2: (Italy) Riccardo Longhi	
WSK Euro Series	OK: (Italy) Andrea Kimi Antonelli	
WSK Euro Series	OKJ: (Italy) Alfio Spina	
WSK Euro Series	60 Mini: (Netherlands) René Lammers	
Rotax Max Challenge	DD2: (Belgium) Xander Przybylak	
Rotax Max Challenge	DD2 Masters: (Latvia) Henrijs Grube	
Rotax Max Challenge	Senior: (United Kingdom) Morgan Porter	
Rotax Max Challenge	Junior: (United Kingdom) Daniel Guinchard	
Rotax Max Challenge	Mini: (Latvia) Alexander Skjelten	
Rotax Max Challenge	Micro: (Lebanon) Christopher El Feghali	

== Motorcycle racing ==
Series	Champion	refer
FIM MotoGP World Championship	(Spain) Joan Mir	2020 MotoGP World Championship
FIM MotoGP World Championship	Constructors: (Italy) Ducati	2020 MotoGP World Championship
FIM MotoGP World Championship	Teams: (Japan) Team Suzuki Ecstar	2020 MotoGP World Championship
FIM Moto2 World Championship	(Italy) Enea Bastianini	2020 Moto2 World Championship
FIM Moto2 World Championship	Constructors: (Germany) Kalex	2020 Moto2 World Championship
FIM Moto2 World Championship	Teams: (Italy) Sky Racing Team VR46	2020 Moto2 World Championship
FIM Moto3 World Championship	(Spain) Albert Arenas	2020 Moto3 World Championship
FIM Moto3 World Championship	Constructors: (Japan) Honda	2020 Moto3 World Championship
FIM Moto3 World Championship	Teams: (Luxembourg) Leopard Racing	2020 Moto3 World Championship
FIM MotoE World Cup	(Spain) Jordi Torres	2020 MotoE World Cup
FIM CEV Moto2 European Championship	(Italy) Yari Montella	2020 FIM CEV Moto2 European Championship
FIM CEV Moto2 European Championship	Constructors': (Italy) Speed Up	2020 FIM CEV Moto2 European Championship
FIM CEV Moto2 European Championship	Superstock 600: (Spain) Fermín Aldeguer	2020 FIM CEV Moto2 European Championship
FIM CEV Moto2 European Championship	Superstock 600 Constructors': (Japan) Yamaha	2020 FIM CEV Moto2 European Championship
FIM CEV Moto3 Junior World Championship	(Spain) Izan Guevara	2020 FIM CEV Moto3 Junior World Championship
FIM CEV Moto3 Junior World Championship	Constructors': (Austria) KTM	2020 FIM CEV Moto3 Junior World Championship
FIM Endurance World Championship	Team's: (France) Suzuki Endurance Racing Team	2019–20 FIM Endurance World Championship
FIM Endurance World Championship	Manufacturers': (Japan) Yamaha	2019–20 FIM Endurance World Championship
FIM Endurance World Championship	Superstock Team's: (France) MOTO AIN	2019–20 FIM Endurance World Championship
FIM Endurance World Championship	Superstock Manufacturers': (Japan) Yamaha	2019–20 FIM Endurance World Championship
FIM Endurance World Championship	Independent Team's: (France) VRD Igol Pierret Experiences	2019–20 FIM Endurance World Championship
FIM European Talent Cup	(Colombia) David Alonso	2020 European Talent Cup
Australian Superbike Championship	(Australia) Wayne Maxwell	
British Superbike Championship	(Australia) Josh Brookes	2020 British Superbike Championship
Red Bull MotoGP Rookies Cup	(Spain) Pedro Acosta	2020 Red Bull MotoGP Rookies Cup
Superbike World Championship	(United Kingdom) Jonathan Rea	2020 Superbike World Championship
Superbike World Championship	Manufacturers': (Japan) Kawasaki	2020 Superbike World Championship
Supersport World Championship	(Italy) Andrea Locatelli	2020 Supersport World Championship
Supersport World Championship	Manufacturers': (Japan) Yamaha	2020 Supersport World Championship
Supersport 300 World Championship	(Netherlands) Jeffrey Buis	2020 Supersport 300 World Championship
Supersport 300 World Championship	Manufacturers': (Japan) Kawasaki	2020 Supersport 300 World Championship

=== Dirt racing ===
Series	Champion	refer
FIM Motocross World Championship	(Slovenia) Tim Gajser	2020 FIM Motocross World Championship
FIM Motocross World Championship	Manufacturers: (Austria) KTM	2020 FIM Motocross World Championship
FIM Motocross World Championship	MX2: (France) Tom Vialle	2020 FIM Motocross World Championship
FIM Motocross World Championship	MX2 Manufacturers: (Japan) Yamaha	2020 FIM Motocross World Championship
FIM Women's Motocross World Championship	(New Zealand) Courtney Duncan	2020 FIM Women's Motocross World Championship
FIM Women's Motocross World Championship	Manufacturers: (Japan) Yamaha	2020 FIM Women's Motocross World Championship
FIM Enduro World Championship	EnduroGP: (United Kingdom) Steve Holcombe	2020 FIM Enduro World Championship
FIM Enduro World Championship	Enduro 1: (Italy) Andrea Verona	2020 FIM Enduro World Championship
FIM Enduro World Championship	Enduro 2: (United Kingdom) Steve Holcombe	2020 FIM Enduro World Championship
FIM Enduro World Championship	Enduro 3: (United Kingdom) Brad Freeman	2020 FIM Enduro World Championship
FIM Enduro World Championship	Junior: (New Zealand) Hamish MacDonald	2020 FIM Enduro World Championship
FIM Enduro World Championship	Junior 1: (Finland) Roni Kytönen	2020 FIM Enduro World Championship
FIM Enduro World Championship	Junior 2: (New Zealand) Hamish MacDonald	2020 FIM Enduro World Championship
FIM Enduro World Championship	Youth: (Spain) Sergio Navarro	2020 FIM Enduro World Championship
FIM Enduro World Championship	Women: (United Kingdom) Jane Daniels	2020 FIM Enduro World Championship
FIM Enduro World Championship	Open 2-Stroke: (Portugal) Gonçalo Reis	2020 FIM Enduro World Championship
FIM Enduro World Championship	Open 4-Stroke: (Belgium) Dietger Damiaens	2020 FIM Enduro World Championship
AMA Supercross Championship	(United States) Eli Tomac	2020 AMA Supercross Championship
AMA Supercross Championship	250cc West: (France) Dylan Ferrandis	2020 AMA Supercross Championship
AMA Supercross Championship	250cc East: (United States) Chase Sexton	2020 AMA Supercross Championship
European Motocross Championship	EMX250: (France) Thibault Benistant	2020 European Motocross Championship
European Motocross Championship	EMX250 Manufacturers': (Japan) Yamaha	2020 European Motocross Championship
European Motocross Championship	EMX125: (Italy) Andrea Bonacorsi	2020 European Motocross Championship
European Motocross Championship	EMX125 Manufacturers': (Austria) KTM	2020 European Motocross Championship
European Motocross Championship	EMX Open: (Estonia) Karel Kutsar	2020 European Motocross Championship
European Motocross Championship	EMX Open Manufacturers': (Austria) KTM	2020 European Motocross Championship
European Motocross Championship	EMX2T: (United Kingdom) Brad Anderson	2020 European Motocross Championship
European Motocross Championship	EMX2T Manufacturers': (Austria) KTM	2020 European Motocross Championship

== Open wheel racing ==
Series	Champion	refer
FIA Formula One World Championship	(United Kingdom) Lewis Hamilton	2020 Formula One World Championship
FIA Formula One World Championship	Teams: (Germany) Mercedes	2020 Formula One World Championship
FIA Formula 2 Championship	(Germany) Mick Schumacher	2020 Formula 2 Championship
FIA Formula 2 Championship	Teams: (Italy) Prema Racing	2020 Formula 2 Championship
FIA Formula E Championship	(Portugal) António Félix da Costa	2019–20 Formula E Championship
FIA Formula E Championship	Teams: (China) DS Techeetah	2019–20 Formula E Championship
IndyCar Series	(New Zealand) Scott Dixon	2020 IndyCar Series
IndyCar Series	Manufacturers: (Japan) Honda	2020 IndyCar Series
IndyCar Series	Rookie: (Netherlands) Rinus VeeKay	2020 IndyCar Series
Indy Pro 2000 Championship	(United States) Sting Ray Robb	2020 Indy Pro 2000 Championship
Atlantic Championship Series	(United States) Keith Grant	2020 Atlantic Championship
F2000 Italian Formula Trophy	(Italy) Dino Rasero	2020 F2000 Italian Formula Trophy
F2000 Italian Formula Trophy	Teams: (Italy) Puresport	2020 F2000 Italian Formula Trophy
MRF Challenge Formula 2000 Championship	(Belgium) Michelangelo Amendola	2019–20 MRF Challenge Formula 2000 Championship
Super Formula Championship	(Japan) Naoki Yamamoto	2020 Super Formula Championship
Super Formula Championship	Teams: (Japan) Vantelin Team TOM'S	2020 Super Formula Championship
BOSS GP Series	(Austria) Ingo Gerstl	2020 BOSS GP Series
BOSS GP Series	Formula: (Italy) Marco Ghiotto	2020 BOSS GP Series
Formula Three
FIA Formula 3 Championship	(Australia) Oscar Piastri	2020 FIA Formula 3 Championship
FIA Formula 3 Championship	Teams: (Italy) Prema Racing	2020 FIA Formula 3 Championship
BRDC British Formula 3 Championship	(United States) Kaylen Frederick	2020 BRDC British Formula 3 Championship
BRDC British Formula 3 Championship	Teams: (United Kingdom) Carlin	2020 BRDC British Formula 3 Championship
Euroformula Open Championship	(China) Yifei Ye	2020 Euroformula Open Championship
Euroformula Open Championship	Teams: (Japan) CryptoTower Racing	2020 Euroformula Open Championship
Euroformula Open Championship	Rookies: (Germany) Niklas Krütten	2020 Euroformula Open Championship
F3 Asian Championship	(Netherlands) Joey Alders	2019-20 F3 Asian Championship
F3 Asian Championship	Teams: (Hong Kong) BlackArts Racing Team	2019-20 F3 Asian Championship
F3 Asian Championship	Masters Cup: (Hong Kong) Thomas Luedi	2019-20 F3 Asian Championship
Formula Regional Americas Championship	(Sweden) Linus Lundqvist	2020 Formula Regional Americas Championship
Formula Regional Americas Championship	Teams: (United States) Global Racing Group	2020 Formula Regional Americas Championship
Formula Regional European Championship	(Brazil) Gianluca Petecof	2020 Formula Regional European Championship
Formula Regional European Championship	Teams: (Italy) Prema Powerteam	2020 Formula Regional European Championship
Formula Regional European Championship	Rookies: (Brazil) Gianluca Petecof	2020 Formula Regional European Championship
Formula Regional Japanese Championship	(Japan) Sena Sakaguchi	2020 Formula Regional Japanese Championship
Formula Renault Eurocup	(France) Victor Martins	2020 Formula Renault Eurocup
Formula Renault Eurocup	Teams: (France) ART Grand Prix	2020 Formula Renault Eurocup
Formula Renault Eurocup	Rookies: (United Kingdom) Alex Quinn	2020 Formula Renault Eurocup
MotorSport Vision Formula Three Cup	(United Kingdom) Stefano Leaney	2020 MotorSport Vision Formula Three Cup
MotorSport Vision Formula Three Cup	Teams: (United Kingdom) CF Racing	2020 MotorSport Vision Formula Three Cup
Super Formula Lights	(Japan) Ritomo Miyata	2020 Super Formula Lights
Super Formula Lights	Masters: (Japan) "Dragon"	2020 Super Formula Lights
Toyota Racing Series	(Brazil) Igor Fraga	2020 Toyota Racing Series
Toyota Racing Series	Teams: (New Zealand) M2 Competition	2020 Toyota Racing Series
Formula 4
ADAC Formula 4 Championship	(United Kingdom) Jonny Edgar	2020 ADAC Formula 4 Championship
ADAC Formula 4 Championship	Teams: (Netherlands) Van Amersfoort Racing	2020 ADAC Formula 4 Championship
ADAC Formula 4 Championship	Rookies: (Germany) Tim Tramnitz	2020 ADAC Formula 4 Championship
F4 British Championship	(United Kingdom) Luke Browning	2020 F4 British Championship
F4 British Championship	Teams: (United Kingdom) Carlin	2020 F4 British Championship
F4 British Championship	Rookie Cup: (Australia) Christian Mansell	2020 F4 British Championship
China Formula 4 Championship	(China) He Zijian	2020 China Formula 4 Championship
China Formula 4 Championship	Teams: (China) LEO GEEKE Team	2020 China Formula 4 Championship
China Formula 4 Championship	Masters' Cup: (Hong Kong) James Wong	2020 China Formula 4 Championship
F4 Danish Championship	(Denmark) Conrad Laursen	2020 F4 Danish Championship
F4 Danish Championship	Teams: (Denmark) Team FSP	2020 F4 Danish Championship
F4 Danish Championship	Formula 5: (Denmark) Mads Hoe	2020 F4 Danish Championship
French F4 Championship	(Japan) Ayumu Iwasa	2020 French F4 Championship
French F4 Championship	Junior: (Germany) Valentino Catalano	2020 French F4 Championship
Italian F4 Championship	(Italy) Gabriele Minì	2020 Italian F4 Championship
Italian F4 Championship	Teams: (Italy) Prema Powerteam	2020 Italian F4 Championship
Italian F4 Championship	Rookies: (Italy) Gabriele Minì	2020 Italian F4 Championship
F4 Japanese Championship	(Japan) Hibiki Taira	2020 F4 Japanese Championship
F4 Japanese Championship	Teams: (Japan) TGR-DC Racing School	2020 F4 Japanese Championship
F4 Japanese Championship	Independent Cup: (Japan) Sergeyevich Sato	2020 F4 Japanese Championship
NACAM Formula 4 Championship	(Mexico) Noel León	2019-20 NACAM Formula 4 Championship
NACAM Formula 4 Championship	Teams: (Mexico) Ram Racing	2019-20 NACAM Formula 4 Championship
F4 Spanish Championship	(Netherlands) Kas Haverkort	2020 F4 Spanish Championship
F4 Spanish Championship	Teams: (Netherlands) MP Motorsport	2020 F4 Spanish Championship
Formula 4 United States Championship	(United States) Hunter Yeany	2020 Formula 4 United States Championship
Formula 4 United States Championship	Teams: (United States) Crosslink Racing with Kiwi Motorsport	2020 Formula 4 United States Championship
Formula 4 UAE Championship	(Italy) Francesco Pizzi	2020 Formula 4 UAE Championship
Formula 4 UAE Championship	Teams: (United Arab Emirates) Xcel Motorsport	2020 Formula 4 UAE Championship
JAF Japan Formula 4	(Japan) Isao Nakajima	2020 JAF Japan Formula 4
Formula Ford
New Zealand Formula Ford Championship	(New Zealand) Billy Frazer	2019–20 New Zealand Formula Ford Championship
F1600 Championship Series	(United States) Simon Sikes	2020 F1600 Championship Series
Pacific F2000 Championship	(United States) Tom Hope	2020 Pacific F2000 Championship
Toyo Tires F1600 Championship Series	(Canada) Mac Clark	2020 Toyo Tires F1600 Championship Series
U.S. F2000 National Championship	(Denmark) Christian Rasmussen	2020 U.S. F2000 National Championship

== Rallying ==
Series	Champion	refer
FIA World Rally Championship	(France) Sébastien Ogier	2020 World Rally Championship
FIA World Rally Championship	Co-Drivers: (France) Julien Ingrassia	2020 World Rally Championship
FIA World Rally Championship	Manufacturers: (South Korea) Hyundai Shell Mobis WRT	2020 World Rally Championship
FIA World Rally Championship-2	(Norway) Mads Østberg	2020 World Rally Championship-2
FIA World Rally Championship-2	Co-Drivers: (Norway) Torstein Eriksen	2020 World Rally Championship-2
FIA World Rally Championship-2	Manufacturers: (Germany) Toksport WRT	2020 World Rally Championship-2
FIA World Rally Championship-3	(Finland) Jari Huttunen	2020 World Rally Championship-3
FIA World Rally Championship-3	Co-Drivers: (Finland) Mikko Lukka	2020 World Rally Championship-3
FIA Junior World Rally Championship	(Sweden) Tom Kristensson	2020 Junior World Rally Championship
FIA Junior World Rally Championship	Co-Drivers: (Sweden) Joakim Sjöberg	2020 Junior World Rally Championship
FIA Junior World Rally Championship	Nations: Sweden	2020 Junior World Rally Championship
FIA R-GT Cup	(Italy) Andrea Mabellini	2020 FIA R-GT Cup
FIA R-GT Cup	Co-Drivers: (Italy) Nicola Arena	2020 FIA R-GT Cup
FIA R-GT Cup	Manufacturers: (Italy) Abarth	2020 FIA R-GT Cup
Central European Zone Rally Championship	Class 2: (Poland) Grzegorz Grzyb	2020 Central European Zone Rally Championship
Central European Zone Rally Championship	2WD: (Poland) Maciej Lubiak	2020 Central European Zone Rally Championship
Czech Rally Championship	(Czech Republic) Václav Pech	2020 Czech Rally Championship
Czech Rally Championship	Co-Drivers: (Czech Republic) Petr Uhel	2020 Czech Rally Championship
Estonian Rally Championship	(Estonia) Georg Gross	2020 Estonian Rally Championship
Estonian Rally Championship	Co-Drivers: (Estonia) Raigo Mõlder	2020 Estonian Rally Championship
European Rally Championship	(Russia) Alexey Lukyanuk	2020 European Rally Championship
European Rally Championship	Co-Drivers: (Russia) Dmitriy Eremeev	2020 European Rally Championship
French Rally Championship	(France) Yoann Bonato	
Hungarian Rally Championship	(Hungary) András Hadik	
Hungarian Rally Championship	Co-Drivers: (Hungary) Krisztián Kertész	
Indian National Rally Championship	(India) Gaurav Gill	
Indian National Rally Championship	Co-Drivers: (India) Musa Sherif	
Italian Rally Championship	(Italy) Andrea Crugnola	
Italian Rally Championship	Co-Drivers: (Italy) Pietro Elia Ometto	
Italian Rally Championship	Manufacturers: (Czech Republic) Škoda	
Middle East Rally Championship	(Qatar) Nasser Al-Attiyah	
NACAM Rally Championship	(Mexico) Ricardo Triviño	2020 NACAM Rally Championship
NACAM Rally Championship	Co-Drivers: (Mexico) Marco Hernández	2020 NACAM Rally Championship
Polish Rally Championship	(Finland) Jari Huttunen	
Romanian Rally Championship	(Romania) Simone Tempestini	
Slovak Rally Championship	(Poland) Grzegorz Grzyb	
Slovak Rally Championship	Co-Drivers: (Poland) Michał Poradzisz	
South African National Rally Championship	(South Africa) Guy Botterill	
South African National Rally Championship	Co-Drivers: (South Africa) Simon Vacy-Lyle	
Spanish Rally Championship	(Spain) Pepe López	
Spanish Rally Championship	Co-Drivers: (Spain) Borja Rozada	

=== Rally Raid ===
Series	Champion	refer
Dakar Rally	Cars: (Spain) Carlos Sainz; Co-driver: (France) Edouard Boulanger	2020 Dakar Rally
Dakar Rally	Bikes: (United States) Ricky Brabec	2020 Dakar Rally
Dakar Rally	Quads: (Chile) Ignacio Casale	2020 Dakar Rally
Dakar Rally	UTV: (United States) Casey Currie; Co-driver: (United States) Sean Berriman	2020 Dakar Rally
Dakar Rally	Trucks: (Russia) Andrey Karginov (Russia) Andrey Mokeev (Russia) Igor Leonov	2020 Dakar Rally
FIM Bajas World Cup	Motorbikes: (Germany) Sebastian Bühler	2020 FIM Bajas World Cup
FIM Bajas World Cup	Quads: (Spain) Toni Vingut	2020 FIM Bajas World Cup

=== Rallycross ===
Series	Champion	refer
FIA World Rallycross Championship	(Sweden) Johan Kristoffersson	2020 FIA World Rallycross Championship
FIA World Rallycross Championship	Teams: (Sweden) KYB Team JC	2020 FIA World Rallycross Championship
FIA World Rallycross Championship	RX2: (Norway) Henrik Krogstad	2020 FIA World Rallycross Championship
FIA World Rallycross Championship	Projekt E: (United Kingdom) Natalie Barratt	2020 FIA World Rallycross Championship
British Rallycross Championship	(United Kingdom) Mark Donnelly	

== Sports car and GT ==
Series	Champion	refer
FIA World Endurance Championship	LMP1: (United Kingdom) Mike Conway; LMP1: (Japan) Kamui Kobayashi; LMP1: (Argentina) José María López	2019–20 FIA World Endurance Championship
FIA World Endurance Championship	LMP1 Manufacturers: (Japan) Toyota Gazoo Racing	2019–20 FIA World Endurance Championship
FIA World Endurance Championship	GTE: (Denmark) Marco Sørensen; GTE: (Denmark) Nicki Thiim	2019–20 FIA World Endurance Championship
FIA World Endurance Championship	GTE Manufacturers: (United Kingdom) Aston Martin	2019–20 FIA World Endurance Championship
FIA World Endurance Championship	LMP2: (Portugal) Filipe Albuquerque; LMP2: (United Kingdom) Philip Hanson	2019–20 FIA World Endurance Championship
FIA World Endurance Championship	LMP2 Teams: (United Kingdom) #22 United Autosports	2019–20 FIA World Endurance Championship
FIA World Endurance Championship	GTE Am: (France) Emmanuel Collard; GTE Am: (Denmark) Nicklas Nielsen; GTE Am: (France) François Perrodo	2019–20 FIA World Endurance Championship
FIA World Endurance Championship	GTE Am Teams: (Italy) #83 AF Corse	2019–20 FIA World Endurance Championship
24H GT Continents Series	GT4: (Spain) Jose Manuel de los Milagros; GT4: (Germany) Björn Simon	2020 24H GT Series
24H GT Continents Series	Teams: (Germany) No. 451 Team Avia Sorg Rennsport	2020 24H GT Series
24H GT Continents Series	GT3-Pro: (Germany) Alfred Renauer	2020 24H GT Series
24H GT Continents Series	GT3-Pro Teams: (Germany) No. 91 Herberth Motorsport	2020 24H GT Series
24H GT Continents Series	GT3-Am: (United States) Charles Espenlaub; GT3-Am: (United States) Shane Lewis; GT3-Am: (United States) Charles Putman	2020 24H GT Series
24H GT Continents Series	GT3-Am Teams: (United States) No. 85 CP Racing	2020 24H GT Series
24H GT Continents Series	GTX: (United Kingdom) Adam Balon; GTX: (United Kingdom) Glynn Geddie; GTX: (United Kingdom) James Geddie; GTX: (United Kingdom) Phil Keen	2020 24H GT Series
24H GT Continents Series	GTX Teams: (United Arab Emirates) No. 788 Dragon Racing	2020 24H GT Series
24H GT Continents Series	991: (France) Eric Mouez	2020 24H GT Series
24H GT Continents Series	991 Teams: (Luxembourg) No. 909 DUWO Racing	2020 24H GT Series
24H GT Continents Series	GT4: (Spain) Jose Manuel de los Milagros; GT4: (Germany) Björn Simon	2020 24H GT Series
24H GT Continents Series	GT4 Teams: (Germany) No. 451 Team Avia Sorg Rennsport	2020 24H GT Series
24H GT Continents Series	Cayman: (Luxembourg) Daniel Bohr; Cayman: (Germany) Thorsten Jung; Cayman: (Germany) Axel Sartingen; Cayman: (Germany) Daniel Schwerfeld	2020 24H GT Series
24H GT Continents Series	Cayman Teams: (Belgium) No. 421 Mühlner Motorsport	2020 24H GT Series
24H GT Continents Series	Ladies Cup: (Poland) Gosia Rdest	2020 24H GT Series
24H GT Continents Series	Junior Cup: (Netherlands) Rik Breukers; Junior Cup: (Germany) Mike David Ortmann; Junior Cup: (United Kingdom) Angus Fender	2020 24H GT Series
24H GT Europe Series	(Belgium) Nico Verdonck	2020 24H GT Series
24H GT Europe Series	Teams: (Germany) No. 401 PROsport Performance AMR	2020 24H GT Series
24H GT Europe Series	GT3: (Switzerland) Daniel Allemann; GT3-Pro: (Germany) Ralf Bohn; GT3-Pro: (Germany) Robert Renauer	2020 24H GT Series
24H GT Europe Series	GT3-Pro Teams: (Germany) No. 91 Herberth Motorsport	2020 24H GT Series
24H GT Europe Series	GT3-Am: (United States) Charles Espenlaub; GT3-Am: (United States) Shane Lewis; GT3-Am: (United States) Charles Putman	2020 24H GT Series
24H GT Europe Series	GT3-Am Teams: (United States) No. 85 CP Racing	2020 24H GT Series
24H GT Europe Series	GTX: (Slovakia) Mat'o Homola; GTX: (Slovakia) Mat'o Konopka; GTX: (Slovakia) Miro Konôpka	2020 24H GT Series
24H GT Europe Series	GTX Teams: (Slovakia) No. 707 ARC Bratislava	2020 24H GT Series
24H GT Europe Series	991: (France) Eric Mouez	2020 24H GT Series
24H GT Europe Series	991 Teams: (Belgium) No. 978 Speedlover	2020 24H GT Series
24H GT Europe Series	GT4: (Belgium) Nico Verdonck	2020 24H GT Series
24H GT Europe Series	GT4 Teams: (Germany) No. 401 PROsport Performance AMR	2020 24H GT Series
24H GT Europe Series	Cayman: (Luxembourg) Daniel Bohr; Cayman: (Germany) Thorsten Jung; Cayman: (Germany) Axel Sartingen; Cayman: (Germany) Daniel Schwerfeld	2020 24H GT Series
24H GT Europe Series	Cayman Teams: (Belgium) No. 421 Mühlner Motorsport	2020 24H GT Series
24H GT Europe Series	Ladies Cup: (Italy) Corinna Gostner	2020 24H GT Series
24H GT Europe Series	Junior Cup: (Austria) Eike Angermayr; Junior Cup: (Netherlands) Rik Breukers	2020 24H GT Series
ADAC GT Masters	(Germany) Michael Ammermüller (Germany) Christian Engelhart	2020 ADAC GT Masters
ADAC GT Masters	Teams: (Germany) SSR Performance	2020 ADAC GT Masters
ADAC GT Masters	Junior Cup: (Germany) Tim Zimmermann	2020 ADAC GT Masters
ADAC GT Masters	Trophy Cup: (Germany) Elia Erhart	2020 ADAC GT Masters
ADAC GT4 Germany	(Germany) Michael Schrey (Italy) Gabriele Piana	2020 ADAC GT4 Germany
ADAC GT4 Germany	Teams: (Germany) Team Allied-Racing	2020 ADAC GT4 Germany
Alpine Elf Europa Cup	(France) Jean-Baptiste Méla	2020 Alpine Elf Europa Cup
Asian Le Mans Series	(United States) James French; LMP2: (Netherlands) Leonard Hoogenboom; LMP2: (Russia) Roman Rusinov	2019–20 Asian Le Mans Series
Asian Le Mans Series	LMP2 Teams: (Russia) #26 G-Drive Racing with Algarve	2019–20 Asian Le Mans Series
Asian Le Mans Series	LMP2 Am: (United States) Cody Ware	2019–20 Asian Le Mans Series
Asian Le Mans Series	LMP2 Am Teams: (United States) #52 Rick Ware Racing	2019–20 Asian Le Mans Series
Asian Le Mans Series	LMP3: (United Kingdom) Colin Noble; LMP3: (United Kingdom) Anthony Wells	2019–20 Asian Le Mans Series
Asian Le Mans Series	LMP3 Teams: (United Kingdom) #2 Nielsen Racing	2019–20 Asian Le Mans Series
Asian Le Mans Series	GT: (Brazil) Marcos Gomes	2019–20 Asian Le Mans Series
Asian Le Mans Series	GT Teams: (Taiwan) #27 HubAuto Corsa	2019–20 Asian Le Mans Series
Asian Le Mans Series	GT Am: (China) Li Lin; GT Am: (China) Zhiwei Lu	2019–20 Asian Le Mans Series
Asian Le Mans Series	GT Am Teams: (China) #16 Astro Veloce Motorsports	2019–20 Asian Le Mans Series
Britcar Endurance Championship	(United Kingdom) Danny Harrison (United Kingdom) Jem Hepworth	2020 Britcar Endurance Championship
Britcar Endurance Championship	Class 1: (United Kingdom) Danny Harrison; Class 1: (United Kingdom) Jem Hepworth	2020 Britcar Endurance Championship
Britcar Endurance Championship	Class 2: (United Kingdom) Paul Bailey; Class 2: (United Kingdom) Andy Schultz; Class 2: (United Kingdom) Ross Wylie	2020 Britcar Endurance Championship
Britcar Endurance Championship	Class 3: (New Zealand) Dave Benett; Class 3: (United Kingdom) Marcus Fothergill	2020 Britcar Endurance Championship
Britcar Endurance Championship	Class 4: (United Kingdom) Luke Davenport; Class 4: (United Kingdom) Mark Davenport; Class 4: (United Kingdom) Marcus Vivian	2020 Britcar Endurance Championship
British GT Championship	GT3: (United Kingdom) Rob Collard; GT3: (United Kingdom) Sandy Mitchell	2020 British GT Championship
British GT Championship	GT3 Pro-Am: (United Kingdom) Ian Loggie; GT3 Pro-Am: (Netherlands) Yelmer Buurman	2020 British GT Championship
British GT Championship	GT3 Silver: (United Kingdom) Rob Collard; GT3 Silver: (United Kingdom) Sandy Mitchell	2020 British GT Championship
British GT Championship	GT3 Teams: (United Kingdom) Barwell Motorsport	2020 British GT Championship
British GT Championship	GT4: (United Kingdom) Jamie Caroline; GT4: (United Kingdom) Daniel Vaughan	2020 British GT Championship
British GT Championship	GT4 Pro-Am: (Sweden) Mia Flewitt; GT4 Pro-Am: (United Kingdom) Euan Hankey	2020 British GT Championship
British GT Championship	GT4 Silver: (United Kingdom) Jamie Caroline; GT4 Silver: (United Kingdom) Daniel Vaughan	2020 British GT Championship
British GT Championship	GT4 Am: (United Kingdom) Luke Sedzikowski; GT4 Am: (United Kingdom) David Whitmore	2020 British GT Championship
British GT Championship	GT4 Teams: (United Kingdom) TF Sport	2020 British GT Championship
DTM Trophy	(Germany) Tim Heinemann	2020 DTM Trophy
DTM Trophy	Junior: (United Kingdom) Ben Green	2020 DTM Trophy
DTM Trophy	XP: (Germany) Fidel Leib	2020 DTM Trophy
DTM Trophy	Teams: (Austria) HP Racing International	2020 DTM Trophy
European Le Mans Series	LMP2: (Portugal) Filipe Albuquerque; LMP2: (United Kingdom) Philip Hanson	2020 European Le Mans Series
European Le Mans Series	LMP2 Teams: (United Kingdom) #22 United Autosports	2020 European Le Mans Series
European Le Mans Series	LMP3: (United Kingdom) Robert Wheldon; LMP3: (United Kingdom) Tom Gamble; LMP3: (United Kingdom) Wayne Boyd	2020 European Le Mans Series
European Le Mans Series	LMP3 Teams: (United Kingdom) #2 United Autosports	2020 European Le Mans Series
European Le Mans Series	LMGTE: (Italy) Michele Beretta; LMGTE: (Belgium) Alessio Picariello; LMGTE: (Germany) Christian Ried	2020 European Le Mans Series
European Le Mans Series	LMGTE Teams: (Germany) No. 77 Proton Competition	2020 European Le Mans Series
Ferrari Challenge Europe	Trofeo Pirelli Pro: (Italy) Emanuele-Maria Tabacchi	2020 Ferrari Challenge Europe
Ferrari Challenge Europe	Trofeo Pirelli Pro-Am: (Denmark) Frederik Paulsen	2020 Ferrari Challenge Europe
Ferrari Challenge Europe	Coppa Shell Pro-Am: (Netherlands) Roger Grouwels	2020 Ferrari Challenge Europe
Ferrari Challenge Europe	Coppa Shell Am: (France) "Alex Fox"	2020 Ferrari Challenge Europe
Ferrari Challenge UK	Trofeo Pirelli: (United Kingdom) Lucky Khera	2020 Ferrari Challenge UK
Ferrari Challenge UK	Coppa Shell: (United Kingdom) Jamie Thwaites	2020 Ferrari Challenge UK
Ferrari Challenge UK	Coppa Dealer: (United Kingdom) Graypaul Birmingham	2020 Ferrari Challenge UK
French GT4 Cup	(Netherlands) Ricardo van der Ende (Belgium) Benjamin Lessennes	2020 French GT4 Cup
French GT4 Cup	Pro-Am: (France) Nicolas Gomar; Pro-Am: (France) Mike Parisy	2020 French GT4 Cup
French GT4 Cup	Am: (France) Wilfred Cazalbon; Am: (France) César Gazeau	2020 French GT4 Cup
Ginetta GT4 Supercup	(United Kingdom) Will Burns	2020 Ginetta GT4 Supercup
Ginetta GT4 Supercup	Pro-Am: (United Kingdom) Colin White	2020 Ginetta GT4 Supercup
Ginetta GT4 Supercup	Am: (United Kingdom) Stewart Lines	2020 Ginetta GT4 Supercup
Ginetta Junior Championship	(United Kingdom) Tom Lebbon	2020 Ginetta Junior Championship
Ginetta Junior Championship	Scholarship: (United Kingdom) Tom Lebbon	2020 Ginetta Junior Championship
GT & Prototype Challenge	LMP3: (Germany) Max Aschoff	2020 GT & Prototype Challenge
GT & Prototype Challenge	Group CN: (Luxembourg) Alain Berg; Group CN: (Romania) Alex Cascatău	2020 GT & Prototype Challenge
GT & Prototype Challenge	SR3: (Germany) Dominik Dierkes	2020 GT & Prototype Challenge
GT Cup Championship	Overall: (United Kingdom) Joshua Jackson; Overall: (United Kingdom) Simon Orange	2020 GT Cup Championship
GT Cup Championship	GTO: (United Kingdom) Richard Chamberlain	2020 GT Cup Championship
GT Cup Championship	GT3: (United Kingdom) Marcus Clutton; GT3: (United Kingdom) John Seale	2020 GT Cup Championship
GT Cup Championship	GTA: (United Kingdom) Joshua Jackson; GTA: (United Kingdom) Simon Orange	2020 GT Cup Championship
GT Cup Championship	GTB: (United Kingdom) Ben Clayden; GTB: (United Kingdom) Sam Randon	2020 GT Cup Championship
GT Cup Championship	GTC: (United Kingdom) John Dhillon; GTC: (United Kingdom) Aaron Scott; GTC: (United Kingdom) Phil Quaife	2020 GT Cup Championship
GT Cup Championship	GTH: (United Kingdom) Steve Ruston; GTH: (United Kingdom) John Whitehouse	2020 GT Cup Championship
GT Cup Championship	Teams: (United Kingdom) Team HARD. Racing	2020 GT Cup Championship
GT Cup Open Europe	(Italy) Aldo Festante	2020 GT Cup Open Europe
GT Cup Open Europe	Teams: (Spain) Baporo Motorsport	2020 GT Cup Open Europe
GT Cup Open Europe	Pro-Am: (Italy) Aldo Festante	2020 GT Cup Open Europe
GT Cup Open Europe	Am: (Andorra) Manuel Cerqueda; Am: (Spain) Daniel Díaz-Varela	2020 GT Cup Open Europe
GT Sports Club America	(United States) Ryan Gates	2020 GT Sports Club America
GT Sports Club America	Titanium Cup: (United States) Kyle Washington	2020 GT Sports Club America
GT Sports Club America	Iron Cup: (United States) Stu Frederick	2020 GT Sports Club America
GT World Challenge America	(United States) Shelby Blackstock (United States) Trent Hindman	2020 GT World Challenge America
GT World Challenge America	Teams: (United States) Racers Edge Motorsports	2020 GT World Challenge America
GT World Challenge America	Pro-Am: (Brazil) Rodrigo Baptista; Pro-Am: (Mexico) Martin Fuentes	2020 GT World Challenge America
GT World Challenge America	Pro-Am Teams: (United States) Squadra Corse	2020 GT World Challenge America
GT World Challenge America	Am: (United States) Fred Poordad; Am: (United States) Max Root	2020 GT World Challenge America
GT World Challenge America	Am Teams: (United States) Wright Motorsports	2020 GT World Challenge America
GT World Challenge Europe	(Russia) Timur Boguslavskiy	2020 GT World Challenge Europe
GT World Challenge Europe	Teams: (Belgium) Belgian Audi Club Team WRT	2020 GT World Challenge Europe
GT World Challenge Europe	Silver Cup: (Argentina) Ezequiel Pérez Companc	2020 GT World Challenge Europe
GT World Challenge Europe	Silver Cup Teams: (Argentina) Madpanda Motorsport	2020 GT World Challenge Europe
GT World Challenge Europe	Pro-Am Cup: (Italy) Eddie Cheever; Pro-Am Cup: (United Kingdom) Chris Froggatt	2020 GT World Challenge Europe
GT World Challenge Europe	Pro-Am Cup Teams: (United Kingdom) Sky - Tempesta Racing	2020 GT World Challenge Europe
GT4 America Series	Sprint Pro: (United States) Michael Cooper	2020 GT4 America Series
GT4 America Series	Sprint Pro Teams: (United States) Blackdog Speed Shop	2020 GT4 America Series
GT4 America Series	Sprint Am: (United States) Michael Dinan	2020 GT4 America Series
GT4 America Series	Sprint Am Teams: (United States) Flying Lizard Motorsports	2020 GT4 America Series
GT4 America Series	SprintX Pro-Am: (United States) Michael Dinan; SprintX Pro-Am: (United States) Robby Foley	2020 GT4 America Series
GT4 America Series	SprintX Pro-Am Teams: (United States) Flying Lizard Motorsports	2020 GT4 America Series
GT4 America Series	SprintX Am: (United States) Zac Anderson; SprintX Am: (United States) Sean Gibbons	2020 GT4 America Series
GT4 America Series	SprintX Am Teams: (United States) Nolasport	2020 GT4 America Series
GT4 America Series	SprintX Silver: (United States) Jarett Andretti; SprintX Silver: (United States) Colin Mullan	2020 GT4 America Series
GT4 America Series	SprintX Silver Teams: (United States) ST Racing	2020 GT4 America Series
GT4 European Series	Silver Cup: (France) Valentin Hasse-Clot; Silver Cup: (France) Théo Nouet	2020 GT4 European Series
GT4 European Series	Teams: (France) AGS Events	2020 GT4 European Series
GT4 European Series	Pro-Am Cup: (Denmark) Bastian Buus; Pro-Am Cup: (Germany) Jan Kasperlik	2020 GT4 European Series
GT4 European Series	Am Cup: (France) Nicolas Gomar; Am Cup: (France) Gilles Vannelet	2020 GT4 European Series
IMSA Prototype Challenge	(United Kingdom) Matthew Bell (United States) Naveen Rao	2020 IMSA Prototype Challenge
IMSA Prototype Challenge	Teams: #64 K2R Motorsports LLC	2020 IMSA Prototype Challenge
IMSA Prototype Challenge	Bronze Cup: (United States) Steven Thomas	2020 IMSA Prototype Challenge
International GT Open	(Portugal) Henrique Chaves (Portugal) Miguel Ramos	2020 International GT Open
International GT Open	Teams: (Spain) Teo Martín Motorsport	2020 International GT Open
International GT Open	Pro-Am: (Brazil) Marcelo Hahn	2020 International GT Open
International GT Open	Am: (Germany) Jens Liebhauser; Am: (Germany) Florian Sholze	2020 International GT Open
Michelin Le Mans Cup	LMP3: (Germany) Laurents Hörr	2020 Michelin Le Mans Cup
Michelin Le Mans Cup	LMP3 Teams: (Luxembourg) No. 3 DKR Engineering	2020 Michelin Le Mans Cup
Michelin Le Mans Cup	GT3: (Italy) Rino Mastronardi	2020 Michelin Le Mans Cup
Michelin Le Mans Cup	GT3 Teams: (Italy) No. 8 Iron Lynx	2020 Michelin Le Mans Cup
Michelin Pilot Challenge	(Canada) Kyle Marcelli (United States) Nate Stacy	2020 Michelin Pilot Challenge
Michelin Pilot Challenge	Teams: (United States) No. 60 KohR Motorsports	2020 Michelin Pilot Challenge
Michelin Pilot Challenge	Manufacturers: (United Kingdom) Aston Martin	2020 Michelin Pilot Challenge
NLS Series	SP9 Pro: (United Kingdom) David Pittard	2020 NLS Series
NLS Series	SP9 Pro-Am: (Germany) Marco Holzer; SP9 Pro-Am: (Germany) Patrick Kolb; SP9 Pro-Am: (Italy) Lorenzo Rocco di Torrepadula	2020 NLS Series
NLS Series	SP9 Am: (Germany) Christian Kohlhaas	2020 NLS Series
NLS Series	SPX: (Germany) Felipe Fernández Laser; SPX: (France) Franck Mailleux; SPX: (Germany) Thomas Mutsch	2020 NLS Series
NLS Series	SP7: (Germany) Marcel Hoppe	2020 NLS Series
NLS Series	SP8: (Denmark) Henrik Bollerslev; SP8: (Germany) Niklas Kry	2020 NLS Series
NLS Series	SP8T: (Germany) Stephan Rösler; SP8T: (Estonia) Tristan Viidas	2020 NLS Series
NLS Series	SP10T: (Germany) Yannick Fübrich; SP19: (Austria) David Griessner; SP10: (Germany) Florian Naumann	2020 NLS Series
NLS Series	Cup 2: (Germany) Georg Goder; Cup 2: (Germany) Martin Schlüter	2020 NLS Series
NLS Series	SP6: (Germany) Stefan Schmickler; SP6: (Germany) Achim Wawer; SP6: (Germany) Volker Wawer	2020 NLS Series
NLS Series	SP4T: (Germany) Ralf Zensen	2020 NLS Series
NLS Series	SP-PRO: (Germany) Marek Böckmann; SP-PRO: (Germany) Tobias Müller; SP-PRO: (Luxembourg) Carlos Rivas	2020 NLS Series
NLS Series	AT(-G): (Germany) Ralph Caba; AT(-G): (Germany) Oliver Sprungmann	2020 NLS Series
NLS Series	Cup X: (Germany) Maik Rönnefarth	2020 NLS Series
NLS Series	Cup 3: (Germany) Thorsten Jung	2020 NLS Series
Super GT	GT500: (Japan) Naoki Yamamoto; GT500: (Japan) Tadasuke Makino	2020 Super GT Series
Super GT	GT300: (Japan) Kiyoto Fujinami; GT300: (Brazil) João Paulo de Oliveira	2020 Super GT Series
Supercar Challenge	GT: (Belgium) John de Wilde	2020 Supercar Challenge
Supercar Challenge	Supersport 1: (Netherlands) Oscar Gräper; Supersport 1: (Netherlands) Henry Zumbrink	2020 Supercar Challenge
Supercar Challenge	Supersport 2: (Netherlands) Berry van Elk	2020 Supercar Challenge
Supercar Challenge	Sport: (Netherlands) Mark Wieringa	2020 Supercar Challenge
Toyota Finance 86 Championship	(New Zealand) Peter Vodanovich	2019–20 Toyota Finance 86 Championship
Trans-Am Series	TA: (United States) Ernie Francis Jr.	2020 Trans-Am Series
Trans-Am Series	TA2: (United States) Mike Skeen	2020 Trans-Am Series
Trans-Am Series	XGT: (United States) Ken Thwaits	2020 Trans-Am Series
Trans-Am Series	SGT: (United States) Lee Saunders	2020 Trans-Am Series
Trans-Am Series	GT: (United States) Billy Griffin	2020 Trans-Am Series
Trans-Am Series	West Coast TA: (United States) Greg Pickett	2020 Trans-Am Series
Trans-Am Series	West Coast TA2: (United States) Jim Gallaugher	2020 Trans-Am Series
Trans-Am Series	West Coast XGT: (United States) Simon Gregg	2020 Trans-Am Series
Trans-Am Series	West Coast SGT: (United States) Carl Rydquist	2020 Trans-Am Series
Trans-Am Series	West Coast GT: (United States) Joe Bogetich	2020 Trans-Am Series
WeatherTech SportsCar Championship	DPi: (United States) Ricky Taylor; DPi: (Brazil) Hélio Castroneves	2020 WeatherTech SportsCar Championship
WeatherTech SportsCar Championship	DPi Teams: (United States) #7 Acura Team Penske	2020 WeatherTech SportsCar Championship
WeatherTech SportsCar Championship	LMP2: (United States) Patrick Kelly	2020 WeatherTech SportsCar Championship
WeatherTech SportsCar Championship	LMP2 Teams: (United States) #52 PR1/Mathiasen Motorsports	2020 WeatherTech SportsCar Championship
WeatherTech SportsCar Championship	GTLM: (Spain) Antonio García; GTLM: (United States) Jordan Taylor	2020 WeatherTech SportsCar Championship
WeatherTech SportsCar Championship	GTLM Teams: (United States) #3 Corvette Racing	2020 WeatherTech SportsCar Championship
WeatherTech SportsCar Championship	GTD: (Germany) Mario Farnbacher; GTD: (United States) Matt McMurry	2020 WeatherTech SportsCar Championship
WeatherTech SportsCar Championship	GTD Teams: (United States) #86 Meyer-Shank Racing with Curb-Agajanian	2020 WeatherTech SportsCar Championship
Porsche Supercup, Porsche Carrera Cup, GT3 Cup Challenge and Porsche Sprint Challenge
Porsche Carrera Cup Germany	Pro: (Netherlands) Larry ten Voorde	2020 Porsche Carrera Cup Germany
Porsche Carrera Cup Germany	Teams: (Germany) FÖRCH Racing	2020 Porsche Carrera Cup Germany
Porsche Carrera Cup Germany	Pro-Am: (Luxembourg) Carlos Rivas	2020 Porsche Carrera Cup Germany
Porsche Carrera Cup Germany	Rookies: (Germany) Laurin Heinrich	2020 Porsche Carrera Cup Germany
Porsche Carrera Cup France	(New Zealand) Jaxon Evans	2020 Porsche Carrera Cup France
Porsche Carrera Cup France	Teams: (Austria) BWT Lechner Racing	2020 Porsche Carrera Cup France
Porsche Carrera Cup Great Britain	Pro: (United Kingdom) Harry King	2020 Porsche Carrera Cup Great Britain
Porsche Carrera Cup Great Britain	Pro-Am: (United Kingdom) Esmee Hawkey	2020 Porsche Carrera Cup Great Britain
Porsche Carrera Cup Great Britain	Am: (United Kingdom) Justin Sherwood	2020 Porsche Carrera Cup Great Britain
Porsche Carrera Cup Japan	(Japan) Tsubasa Kondō	2020 Porsche Carrera Cup Japan
Porsche Carrera Cup Japan	Teams: (Japan) NK Racing	2020 Porsche Carrera Cup Japan
Porsche Carrera Cup Japan	Pro-Am: (Japan) Kiyoshi Uchiyama	2020 Porsche Carrera Cup Japan
Porsche Carrera Cup Japan	Am: (China) Sky Chen	2020 Porsche Carrera Cup Japan
Porsche Carrera Cup Italia	Pro: (Italy) Simone Iaquinta	2020 Porsche Carrera Cup Italia
Porsche Carrera Cup Italia	Teams: (Italy) Ghinzani Arco Motorsport	2020 Porsche Carrera Cup Italia
Porsche Carrera Cup Italia	Silver Cup: (Italy) Stefano Bianconi	2020 Porsche Carrera Cup Italia
Porsche Carrera Cup Italia	Michelin Cup: (United Arab Emirates) Bashar Mardini	2020 Porsche Carrera Cup Italia
Porsche Carrera Cup Scandinavia	Pro: (Sweden) Lukas Sundahl	2020 Porsche Carrera Cup Scandinavia
Porsche Carrera Cup Scandinavia	Approved Cup: (Sweden) Patrick Rundquist	2020 Porsche Carrera Cup Scandinavia
Porsche Sprint Challenge Great Britain	Pro: (United Kingdom) James Dorlin	2020 Porsche Sprint Challenge Great Britain
Porsche Sprint Challenge Great Britain	Am: (Norway) Ambrogio Perfetti	2020 Porsche Sprint Challenge Great Britain
Porsche Supercup	(Netherlands) Larry ten Voorde	2020 Porsche Supercup
Porsche Supercup	Rookie: (Netherlands) Max van Splunteren	2020 Porsche Supercup
Porsche Supercup	Pro-Am: (Norway) Roar Lindland	2020 Porsche Supercup
Porsche Supercup	Teams: (Austria) BWT Lechner Racing	2020 Porsche Supercup

== Stock car racing ==
Series	Champion	refer
ARCA Menards Series	(United States) Bret Holmes	2020 ARCA Menards Series
ARCA Menards Series East	(United States) Sam Mayer	2020 ARCA Menards Series East
ARCA Menards Series West	(United States) Jesse Love	2020 ARCA Menards Series West
Stock Car Brasil	(Brazil) Ricardo Maurício	2020 Stock Car Brasil Championship
Turismo Carretera	(Argentina) Mariano Werner	2020 Turismo Carretera Championship
NASCAR
NASCAR Cup Series	(United States) Chase Elliott	2020 NASCAR Cup Series
NASCAR Cup Series	Manufacturers: (United States) Ford	2020 NASCAR Cup Series
NASCAR Xfinity Series	(United States) Austin Cindric	2020 NASCAR Xfinity Series
NASCAR Xfinity Series	Manufacturers: (United States) Chevrolet	2020 NASCAR Xfinity Series
NASCAR Gander RV & Outdoors Truck Series	(United States) Sheldon Creed	2020 NASCAR Gander RV & Outdoors Truck Series
NASCAR Gander RV & Outdoors Truck Series	Manufacturers: (United States) Chevrolet	2020 NASCAR Gander RV & Outdoors Truck Series
NASCAR Advance Auto Parts Weekly Series	(United States) Josh Berry	2020 NASCAR Advance Auto Parts Weekly Series
NASCAR PEAK Mexico Series	(Mexico) Rubén Rovelo	2020 NASCAR PEAK Mexico Series
NASCAR Pinty's Series	(Canada) Jason Hathaway	2020 NASCAR Pinty's FanCave Challenge
NASCAR Pinty's Series	Manufacturers: (United States) Chevrolet	2020 NASCAR Pinty's FanCave Challenge
NASCAR Whelen Euro Series	(Israel) Alon Day	2020 NASCAR Whelen Euro Series
NASCAR Whelen Euro Series	EuroNASCAR 2: (Italy) Vittorio Ghirelli	2020 NASCAR Whelen Euro Series
NASCAR Whelen Modified Tour	(United States) Justin Bonsignore	2020 NASCAR Whelen Modified Tour

== Touring cars ==
Series	Champion	refer
Britcar Trophy Championship	(United Kingdom) Oliver Smith	2020 Britcar Trophy Championship
Britcar Trophy Championship	Class 5: (United Kingdom) Charlie Campbell; Class 5: (United Kingdom) Rob Smith	2020 Britcar Trophy Championship
Britcar Trophy Championship	Class 6: (United Kingdom) Oliver Smith	2020 Britcar Trophy Championship
Britcar Trophy Championship	Class 7: (United Kingdom) Johnathan Barrett	2020 Britcar Trophy Championship
Britcar Trophy Championship	Clios: (United Kingdom) Aaron Thompson; Clios: (United Kingdom) Steve Thompson	2020 Britcar Trophy Championship
British Touring Car Championship	(United Kingdom) Ashley Sutton	2020 British Touring Car Championship
British Touring Car Championship	Manufacturers': (United Kingdom) Team BMW	2020 British Touring Car Championship
British Touring Car Championship	Teams': (United Kingdom) Team BMW	2020 British Touring Car Championship
British Touring Car Championship	Independent Drivers': (United Kingdom) Ashley Sutton	2020 British Touring Car Championship
British Touring Car Championship	Independent Teams': (United Kingdom) Laser Tools Racing	2020 British Touring Car Championship
British Touring Car Championship	Jack Sears Trophy: (United Kingdom) Michael Crees	2020 British Touring Car Championship
British Touring Car Championship	Goodyear Wingfoot Award: (United Kingdom) Colin Turkington	2020 British Touring Car Championship
Deutsche Tourenwagen Masters	(Germany) René Rast	2020 Deutsche Tourenwagen Masters
Deutsche Tourenwagen Masters	Teams: (Germany) Audi Sport Team Abt Sportsline	2020 Deutsche Tourenwagen Masters
Deutsche Tourenwagen Masters	Manufacturers: (Germany) Audi	2020 Deutsche Tourenwagen Masters
Jaguar I-Pace eTrophy	(New Zealand) Simon Evans	2019–20 Jaguar I-Pace eTrophy
Jaguar I-Pace eTrophy	Pro-Am: (Saudi Arabia) Fahad Algosaibi	2019–20 Jaguar I-Pace eTrophy
NZ Touring Cars Championship	(New Zealand) Andre Heimgartner	2019–20 New Zealand Touring Car Championship
NZ Touring Cars Championship	V8 Lites: (New Zealand) Justin McIlroy	2019–20 New Zealand Touring Car Championship
NZ Touring Cars Championship	Open: (New Zealand) Sam Collins	2019–20 New Zealand Touring Car Championship
Supercars Championship	(New Zealand) Scott McLaughlin	2020 Supercars Championship
Supercars Championship	Teams: (Australia) DJR Team Penske	2020 Supercars Championship
Supercars Championship	Manufacturers: (United States) Ford	2020 Supercars Championship
Super2 Series	(Australia) Thomas Randle	2020 Super2 Series
Súper TC 2000	(Argentina) Matías Rossi	2020 Súper TC 2000
Súper TC 2000	Teams: (Argentina) Toyota Gazoo Racing YPF Infinia	2020 Súper TC 2000
Súper TC 2000	Manufacturers: (Japan) Toyota	2020 Súper TC 2000
Top Race V6	(Argentina) Matías Rossi	2020 Top Race V6
Turismo Nacional	Clase 3: (Argentina) José Manuel Urcera	2020 Turismo Nacional Championship
Turismo Nacional	Clase 2: (Argentina) Nicolás Posco	2020 Turismo Nacional Championship
TCR Series
24H TCE Continents Series	(Switzerland) Miklas Born (Italy) Roberto Ferri	2020 24H TCE Series
24H TCE Continents Series	Teams': (Switzerland) No. 112 Autorama Motorsport by Wolf-Power Racing	2020 24H TCE Series
24H TCE Continents Series	TCR: (Switzerland) Miklas Born; TCR: (Italy) Roberto Ferri	2020 24H TCE Series
24H TCE Continents Series	TCR Teams': (Switzerland) No. 112 Autorama Motorsport by Wolf-Power Racing	2020 24H TCE Series
24H TCE Continents Series	TCX: (France) Guillaume Roman	2020 24H TCE Series
24H TCE Continents Series	TCX Teams': (France) No. 226 Nordschleife Racing	2020 24H TCE Series
24H TCE Continents Series	TC: (United States) Mark Brummond; TC: (Denmark) Johan Schwartz; TC: (Mexico) Benito Tagle; TC: (United States) Skip Woody	2020 24H TCE Series
24H TCE Continents Series	TC Teams': (Germany) No. 351 Team Avia Sorg Rennsport	2020 24H TCE Series
24H TCE Europe Series	(Switzerland) Miklas Born	2020 24H TCE Series
24H TCE Europe Series	Teams' Championship: (Switzerland) Autorama Motorsport by Wolf-Power Racing	2020 24H TCE Series
24H TCE Europe Series	TCR: (Switzerland) Miklas Born	2020 24H TCE Series
24H TCE Europe Series	TCR Teams': (Switzerland) Autorama Motorsport by Wolf-Power Racing	2020 24H TCE Series
24H TCE Europe Series	TCX: (France) Daniel Waszczinski	2020 24H TCE Series
24H TCE Europe Series	TCX Teams': (France) No. 226 Nordschleife Racing	2020 24H TCE Series
24H TCE Europe Series	TC: (United Kingdom) Dave Cox; TC: (United Kingdom) Jason Cox; TC: (United Kingdom) George Haynes	2020 24H TCE Series
24H TCE Europe Series	TC Teams': (United Kingdom) No. 339 WEC Motorsport	2020 24H TCE Series
ADAC TCR Germany Touring Car Championship	(Finland) Antti Buri	2020 ADAC TCR Germany Touring Car Championship
ADAC TCR Germany Touring Car Championship	Teams: (Austria) HP Racing International	2020 ADAC TCR Germany Touring Car Championship
FIA World Touring Car Cup	(France) Yann Ehrlacher	2020 World Touring Car Cup
FIA World Touring Car Cup	Teams: (Sweden) Cyan Racing Lynk & Co	2020 World Touring Car Cup
FIA World Touring Car Cup	Rookies: (Belgium) Gilles Magnus	2020 World Touring Car Cup
FIA World Touring Car Cup	WTCR Trophy: (France) Jean-Karl Vernay	2020 World Touring Car Cup
TC America Series	TCR: (United States) Tyler Maxson	2020 TC America Series
TC America Series	TCR Teams: (United States) Copeland Motorsports	2020 TC America Series
TC America Series	TC: (United States) James Clay	2020 TC America Series
TC America Series	TC Teams: (United States) Bimmerworld Racing	2020 TC America Series
TC America Series	TCA: (United States) Kevin Boehm	2020 TC America Series
TC America Series	TCA Teams: (United States) Boehm Racing	2020 TC America Series
Canadian Touring Car Championship	TCR: (Canada) Zachary Vanier	2020 Canadian Touring Car Championship
Canadian Touring Car Championship	GT Sport: (Canada) Orey Fidani	2020 Canadian Touring Car Championship
TCR China Touring Car Championship	(China) Ma Qing Hua	2020 TCR China Touring Car Championship
TCR China Touring Car Championship	Teams: (China) Team MG XPower	2020 TCR China Touring Car Championship
TCR China Touring Car Championship	Am Cup: (China) Yang Xi	2020 TCR China Touring Car Championship
TCR China Touring Car Championship	Car Model Cup: (China) MG 6 X-Power TCR	2020 TCR China Touring Car Championship
TCR Denmark Touring Car Series	(Denmark) Kasper Jensen	2020 TCR Denmark Touring Car Series
TCR Denmark Touring Car Series	Teams: (Denmark) LM Racing	2020 TCR Denmark Touring Car Series
TCR Denmark Touring Car Series	Trophy: (Denmark) René Povlsen	2020 TCR Denmark Touring Car Series
TCR Eastern Europe Trophy	(Serbia) Dušan Borković	2020 TCR Eastern Europe Trophy
TCR Eastern Europe Trophy	Teams: (Hungary) M1RA	2020 TCR Eastern Europe Trophy
TCR Europe Touring Car Series	(Morocco) Mehdi Bennani	2020 TCR Europe Touring Car Series
TCR Europe Touring Car Series	Teams: (Belgium) Comtoyou Racing	2020 TCR Europe Touring Car Series
TCR Europe Touring Car Series	Yokohama Trophy Diamond: (France) Stéphane Ventaja	2020 TCR Europe Touring Car Series
TCR Europe Touring Car Series	Yokohama Trophy Rookie: (Belgium) Nicolas Baert	2020 TCR Europe Touring Car Series
TCR Italy Touring Car Championship	(Italy) Salvatore Tavano	2020 TCR Italy Touring Car Championship
TCR Italy Touring Car Championship	Teams: (Italy) Scuderia del Girasole Cupra Racing	2020 TCR Italy Touring Car Championship
TCR Italy Touring Car Championship	DSG: (Italy) Michele Imberti	2020 TCR Italy Touring Car Championship
TCR Italy Touring Car Championship	Under 25: (Italy) Eric Brigliadori	2020 TCR Italy Touring Car Championship
TCR Japan Touring Car Series	Saturday Series: (Japan) Takuro Shinohara	2020 TCR Japan Touring Car Series
TCR Japan Touring Car Series	Saturday Series (Bronze): (Japan) Rio Shimono	2020 TCR Japan Touring Car Series
TCR Japan Touring Car Series	Sunday Series: (Japan) Takuro Shinohara	2020 TCR Japan Touring Car Series
TCR Japan Touring Car Series	Sunday Series (Bronze): (Japan) 'Hirobon'	2020 TCR Japan Touring Car Series
TCR Japan Touring Car Series	Entrants: (Japan) Audi Team Hitotsuyama	2020 TCR Japan Touring Car Series
TCR Malaysia Touring Car Championship	(Germany) Luca Engstler	2020 TCR Malaysia Touring Car Championship
TCR Malaysia Touring Car Championship	Cup: (Malaysia) Douglas Khoo	2020 TCR Malaysia Touring Car Championship
TCR Malaysia Touring Car Championship	Teams: (Germany) Hyundai Team Engstler	2020 TCR Malaysia Touring Car Championship
NLS Series	SP5: (Germany) Lucian Gavris	2020 NLS Series
NLS Series	SP3: (Belgium) Jacques Derenne; SP3: (Belgium) Olivier Muytjens	2020 NLS Series
NLS Series	SP3T: (Germany) Hermann Bock	2020 NLS Series
NLS Series	SP2T: (Switzerland) Bernhard Badertscher; SP2T: (Switzerland) Max Langenegger	2020 NLS Series
NLS Series	V6: (Spain) Carlos Arimón Solivellas; V6: (Germany) Christian Büllesbach; V6: (Germany) Ulrich Korn; V6: (Germany) Andreas Schettler	2020 NLS Series
NLS Series	V5: (Germany) Norbert Fischer; V5: (Norway) Oskar Sandberg; V5: (Germany) Daniel Zils	2020 NLS Series
NLS Series	VT3: (Germany) Alex Fielenbach; VT3: (Germany) Wolfgang Weber	2020 NLS Series
NLS Series	VT2: (Switzerland) Robert van Husen	2020 NLS Series
NLS Series	V2: (Germany) Manfred Schmitz; V2: (Germany) Reiner Thomas	2020 NLS Series
NLS Series	M2 CS: (Finland) Sami-Matti Trogen; M2 CS: (Germany) Mario von Bohlen und Halbach	2020 NLS Series
NLS Series	H4: (Germany) Bernd Kleeschulte	2020 NLS Series
NLS Series	H2: (Germany) Michael Bohrer; H2: (Germany) Stephan Epp; H2: (Germany) Gerrit Holthaus	2020 NLS Series
NLS Series	Cup 5: (Germany) Marcel Marchewicz; Cup 5: (Germany) Tim Neuser	2020 NLS Series
NLS Series	V4: (Germany) Danny Brink; V4: (Germany) Philipp Leisen; V4: (Germany) Christopher Rink	2020 NLS Series
NLS Series	OPC: (Germany) Lena Strycek; OPC: (Germany) Robin Strycek; OPC: (Germany) Volker Strycek	2020 NLS Series
NLS Series	TCR Pro: (Germany) Heiko Hammel; TCR Pro: (Germany) Matthias Wasel	2020 NLS Series
NLS Series	TCR Am: (Germany) Michael Brüggenkamp; TCR Am: (Germany) Roland Schmid; TCR Am: (Germany) Roger Vögeli; TCR Am: (Finland) Ilkka Kariste; TCR Am: (Finland) Hannu Luostarinen; TCR Am: (Germany) Lucas Waltermann	2020 NLS Series
Russian Circuit Racing Series	TCR: (Russia) Kirill Ladygin	2020 Russian Circuit Racing Series
Russian Circuit Racing Series	TCR Teams: (Russia) LADA Sport Rosneft	2020 Russian Circuit Racing Series
Russian Circuit Racing Series	Touring Light: (Russia) Vladimir Sheshenin	2020 Russian Circuit Racing Series
Russian Circuit Racing Series	Touring Light Teams: (Russia) LADA Sport Rosneft	2020 Russian Circuit Racing Series
Russian Circuit Racing Series	Super Production: (Russia) Vladislav Nezvankin	2020 Russian Circuit Racing Series
Russian Circuit Racing Series	Super Production Teams: (Russia) LADA Sport Rosneft	2020 Russian Circuit Racing Series
Russian Circuit Racing Series	S1600: (Russia) Petr Plotnikov	2020 Russian Circuit Racing Series
Russian Circuit Racing Series	S1600 Teams: (Russia) Akhmat Racing Team	2020 Russian Circuit Racing Series
Russian Circuit Racing Series	S1600 Junior: (Russia) Egor Fokin	2020 Russian Circuit Racing Series
Russian Circuit Racing Series	S1600 Junior Teams: (Russia) Rally Academy	2020 Russian Circuit Racing Series
Russian Circuit Racing Series	GT4: (Russia) Denis Remenyako	2020 Russian Circuit Racing Series
Russian Circuit Racing Series	GT4 Teams: (Russia) Capital Racing Team	2020 Russian Circuit Racing Series
Russian Circuit Racing Series	Sports Prototype CN: (Russia) Pavel Kuzminov	2020 Russian Circuit Racing Series
STCC TCR Scandinavia Touring Car Championship	(United Kingdom) Rob Huff	2020 STCC TCR Scandinavia Touring Car Championship
STCC TCR Scandinavia Touring Car Championship	Teams: (Sweden) Lestrup Racing	2020 STCC TCR Scandinavia Touring Car Championship
Touring Car Trophy	(United Kingdom) Henry Neal	2020 Touring Car Trophy
Touring Car Trophy	TCR UK: (United Kingdom) Lewis Kent	2020 Touring Car Trophy

== Truck racing ==
Series	Champion	refer
Copa Truck	(Brazil) Beto Monteiro	2020 Copa Truck season

== See also ==
- List of motorsport championships
