= 2021 Masters Historic Formula One Championship USA =

The 2021 Masters Historic Formula One Championship USA was the second season of the Masters Historic Formula One Championship USA. It began at Laguna Seca Raceway on 16 May and will end at Sonoma Raceway on 17 October.

== Cars and Drivers ==
Chassis	Engine	No.	Driver	Class	Rounds
Ferrari 312T2	Ferrari 3.0 L Flat-12	1	(United States) Chris MacAllister	F	2, 4–5
Lotus 91	Ford Cosworth DFV 3.0 L V8	1	(United Kingdom) Gregory Thornton	H	3, 6
Lotus 91	Ford Cosworth DFV 3.0 L V8	12	(United Kingdom) Gregory Thornton	H	2, 4–5
Lotus 91	Ford Cosworth DFV 3.0 L V8	11	(United Kingdom) Dan Collins	H	2–5
Tyrrell 009	Ford Cosworth DFV 3.0 L V8	3	(United States) Eric Haga	H	1
Tyrrell 009	Ford Cosworth DFV 3.0 L V8	14	(United States) Cal Meeker	H	1, 3–6
Tyrrell 008	Ford Cosworth DFV 3.0 L V8	4	(United States) Michael Malone	F	5
Lotus 77	Ford Cosworth DFV 3.0 L V8	5	(United States) Chris Locke	F	2–6
Lotus 77	Ford Cosworth DFV 3.0 L V8	6	(United States) Chris Locke	F	1
Tyrrell 011	Ford Cosworth DFV 3.0 L V8	6	(United Kingdom) James Hagan	H	2
Williams FW07B	Ford Cosworth DFV 3.0 L V8	7	(United States) Zak Brown	H	5
Lotus 78	Ford Cosworth DFV 3.0 L V8	8	(United Kingdom) Lee Mowle	H	2–5
March 741	Ford Cosworth DFV 3.0 L V8	9	(United States) Martin Lauber	F	1, 4
March 741	Ford Cosworth DFV 3.0 L V8	9	(United States) Richard Griot	F	5–6
March 751	Ford Cosworth DFV 3.0 L V8	9	(United States) Robert Blain	F	2–3
Lotus 49	Ford Cosworth DFV 3.0 L V8	15	(United States) Alex MacAllister	S	4–5
March 76	Ford Cosworth DFV 3.0 L V8	15	(United States) Gregory Gray	F	6
Williams FW08C	Ford Cosworth DFV 3.0 L V8	16	(United States) John McKenna	H	1
Parnelli VPJ4	Ford Cosworth DFV 3.0 L V8	28	(United States) John McKenna	F	3
Parnelli VPJ4	Ford Cosworth DFV 3.0 L V8	29	(United States) John McKenna	F	5
Shadow DN5	Ford Cosworth DFV 3.0 L V8	16	(United States) Phil Gumpert	F	3
Shadow DN9	Ford Cosworth DFV 3.0 L V8	17	(United States) Charles Warner	H	3, 5–6
Shadow DN9	Ford Cosworth DFV 3.0 L V8	19	(United States) Charles Warner	H	1–2
Wolf WR6	Ford Cosworth DFV 3.0 L V8	20	(United Kingdom) Doug Mockett	H	1–3
Penske PC4	Ford Cosworth DFV 3.0 L V8	28	(United Kingdom) Doug Mockett	F	5
Ensign N179	Ford Cosworth DFV 3.0 L V8	22	(United States) Bud Moeller	H	1–3
Ensign N179	Ford Cosworth DFV 3.0 L V8	61	(United States) Bud Moeller	H	4
Williams FW08	Ford Cosworth DFV 3.0 L V8	61	(United States) Bud Moeller	H	5–6
Alfa Romeo 182	Alfa Romeo 1260 3.0 L V12	23	(United States) Timothy de Silva	H	1
Williams FW07C	Ford Cosworth DFV 3.0 L V8	27	(United States) Charles Nearburg	H	1, 4–5
McLaren M23	Ford Cosworth DFV 3.0 L V8	30	(United States) Danny Baker	F	4–5
Arrows A4	Ford Cosworth DFV 3.0 L V8	32	(United States) Wade Carter	H	1, 4–5
Tyrrell 010	Ford Cosworth DFV 3.0 L V8	33	(United Kingdom) Martin Lauber	H	5
Tyrrell 010	Ford Cosworth DFV 3.0 L V8	33	(United States) Ethan Shippert	H	6
Lotus 87	Ford Cosworth DFV 3.0 L V8	37	(United States) Jonathan Holtzman	H	2
March 761	Ford Cosworth DFV 3.0 L V8	41	(United States) Robin Hunter	F	4–5
March 761	Ford Cosworth DFV 3.0 L V8	43	(United States) Stephen Romak	F	1, 4
Tyrrell 011B	Ford Cosworth DFV 3.0 L V8	45	(United Kingdom) Jamie Constable	L	2–3
March 76A	Ford Cosworth DFV 3.0 L V8	81	(United Kingdom) Jamie Constable	L	3
LEC CRP1	Ford Cosworth DFV 3.0 L V8	51	(United Kingdom) Ron Maydon	F	All
Iso–Marlboro FX3B	Ford Cosworth DFV 3.0 L V8	67	(United States) Michael Eckstein	F	4–5
Shadow DN5	Ford Cosworth DFV 3.0 L V8	71	(Brazil) Dalmo de Vasconcelos	F	1, 4–5
Shadow DN5	Ford Cosworth DFV 3.0 L V8	71	(United States) Nicholas Colyvas	F	6

Icon	Class
F	Fittipaldi Class
H	Head Class
S	Stewart Class
L	Lauda Class

== Race results ==
Bold indicates overall winner.

Round		Race	Circuit	Date	Pole position	Fastest lap	Winning ST	Winning FT	Winning HE	Winning LA
1	R1	Masters Speed Festival	(California) Laguna Seca Raceway	16 May	(United States) Charles Nearburg	(United States) Charles Nearburg	No entries	(United States) Martin Lauber	**(United States) Charles Nearburg**	No entries
1	R2	Masters Speed Festival	(California) Laguna Seca Raceway	16 May		(United States) Timothy de Silva	No entries	(United States) Martin Lauber	**(United States) Charles Nearburg**	No entries
2	R3	Masters & HSR Race Weekend	(New York (state)) Watkins Glen International	10 July	(United Kingdom) James Hagan	(United Kingdom) Gregory Thornton	No entries	(United Kingdom) Ron Maydon	**(United Kingdom) Gregory Thornton**	(United Kingdom) Jamie Constable
2	R4	Masters & HSR Race Weekend	(New York (state)) Watkins Glen International	11 July		(United Kingdom) James Hagan	No entries	(United Kingdom) Ron Maydon	**(United Kingdom) Gregory Thornton**	No finishers
3	R5	The WeatherTech International Challenge	(Wisconsin) Road America	17 July	(United Kingdom) Gregory Thornton	(United Kingdom) Gregory Thornton	No entries	(United States) Chris Locke	**(United Kingdom) Gregory Thornton**	(United Kingdom) Jamie Constable
3	R6	The WeatherTech International Challenge	(Wisconsin) Road America	18 July		(United Kingdom) Gregory Thornton	No entries	(United States) Chris Locke	**(United Kingdom) Gregory Thornton**	(United Kingdom) Jamie Constable
4	R7	Monterey Pre-Reunion	(California) Laguna Seca Raceway	8 August	(United States) Charles Nearburg	(United States) Charles Nearburg	(United States) Alex MacAllister	(United States) Martin Lauber	(United States) **Charles Nearburg**	No entries
4	R8	Monterey Pre-Reunion	(California) Laguna Seca Raceway	8 August		(United States) Charles Nearburg	(United States) Alex MacAllister	(United States) Martin Lauber	(United States) **Cal Meeker**	No entries
5	R9	Rolex Monterey Motorsports Reunion	(California) Laguna Seca Raceway	14 August	(United States) Charles Nearburg	(United States) Charles Nearburg	(United States) Alex MacAllister	(United Kingdom) Ron Maydon	**(United States) Charles Nearburg**	No entries
5	R10	Rolex Monterey Motorsports Reunion	(California) Laguna Seca Raceway	14 August		(United States) Charles Nearburg	(United States) Alex MacAllister	(United Kingdom) Ron Maydon	**(United States) Charles Nearburg**	No entries
6	R11	Yokohama Drivers' Cup USA	(California) Sonoma Raceway	15–17 October	(United Kingdom) Gregory Thornton	(United Kingdom) Gregory Thornton	No entries	(United States) Nicholas Colyvas	**(United Kingdom) Gregory Thornton**	No entries
6	R12	Yokohama Drivers' Cup USA	(California) Sonoma Raceway	15–17 October		(United Kingdom) Gregory Thornton	No entries	(United States) Chris Locke	**(United Kingdom) Gregory Thornton**	No entries

=== Championships standings ===
Starters	Position	**1st**	**2nd**	**3rd**	**4th**	**5th**	**6th**	**Fastest Lap**
3+	Points	9	6	4	3	2	1	1
2	Points	6	4					1
1	Points	4						1

Pos.	Driver	Chassis	(California) LGA1		(New York (state)) WGL		(Wisconsin) ELK		(California) LGA2		(California) LGA3		(California) SON		Points
Stewart Class
1	(United States) Alex MacAllister	Lotus 49							**16**	14	**17**	19			20
Fittipaldi Class
1	(United States) Chris Locke	Lotus 77	7	5	DNS	DNS	**6**	3	8	8	10	9	Ret	2	68
2	(United Kingdom) Ron Maydon	LEC CRP1	5	6	**6**	4	7	4	10	10	**7**	7	**Ret**	3	64
3	(United States) Martin Lauber	March 741	2	4					**3**	3					39
4	(United States) Stephen Romak	March 761	**6**	DNS					4	6					18
5	(United States) Nicholas Colyvas	Shadow DN5											4	4	13
6	(United States) Danny Baker	McLaren M23							7	7	Ret	10			13
7	(United States) Chris MacAllister	Ferrari 312T2			11	DNS			12	12	14	12			12
8	(United States) Gray Gregory	March 761											5	5	9
9	(United States) John McKenna	Parnelli VPJ4					8	DNS			12	20			8
10	(United States) Robert Blain	March 751			Ret	DNS	9	5							7
11	(United States) Richard Griot	March 741									16	17	7	7	6
12	(Brazil) Dalmo de Vasconcelos	Shadow DN5	9	DNS					13	11	19	13			5
13	(United Kingdom) Doug Mockett	Penske PC4									13	14			4
14	(United States) Phil Gumpert	Shadow DN8					13	Ret							2
15	(United States) Michael Eckstein	Iso–Marlboro FX3B							14	13	15	15			1
16	(United States) Robin Hunter	March 761							15	DNS	DNS	DNS			0
17	(United States) Michael Malone	Tyrrell 008									18	18			0
Head Class
1	(United Kingdom) Gregory Thornton	Lotus 91			1	1	**1**	1	DNS	DNS	2	2	**1**	1	71
2	(United States) Charles Nearburg	Williams FW07C	**1**	1					**1**	2	**1**	1			56
3	(United States) Cal Meeker	Tyrrell 009	4	2			2	2	2	1	3	3	2	DNS	53
4	(United States) Bud Moeller	Ensign N179	6	7	7	5	4	Ret	4	4					31
4	(United States) Bud Moeller	Williams FW08									5	5	3	Ret	31
5	(United States) Jonathan Holtzman	Lotus 87			4	2									20
6	(United States) Charles Warner	Shadow DN9	10	8	9	DNS	10	7			20	16	6	6	18
7	(United States) Wade Carter	Arrows A4	DNS	Ret					6	5	4	4			15
8	(United Kingdom) Dan Collins	Lotus 91			5	3	3	Ret	11	15	9	11			13
9	(United Kingdom) Lee Mowle	Lotus 78			8	7	5	DNS	9	9	6	6			10
10	(United Kingdom) James Hagan	Tyrrell 011			**2**	Ret									7
11	(United States) Timothy de Silva	Alfa Romeo 182	Ret	3											5
12	(United States) Doug Mockett	Wolf WR6	DNS	DNS	10	6	12	8							4
13	(United States) John McKenna	Williams FW08C	8	DNS											3
14	(United States) Martin Lauber	Tyrrell 010									8	8			0
15	(United States) Zak Brown	Williams FW07B									11	DNS			0
	(United States) Eric Haga	Tyrrell 009	DNS	DNS											0
	(United States) Ethan Shippert	Tyrrell 010											DNS	DNS	0
Lauda Class
1	(United Kingdom) Jamie Constable	Tyrrell 011B			**3**	Ret	WD	WD							16
1	(United Kingdom) Jamie Constable	March 76A					**11**	6							16
Pos.	Driver	Chassis	(California) LGA1		(New York (state)) WGL		(Wisconsin) ELK		(California) LGA2		(California) LGA3		(California) SON		Points

Key
Colour	Result
Gold	Winner
Silver	Second place
Bronze	Third place
Green	Other points position
Blue	Other classified position
Blue	Not classified, finished (NC)
Purple	Not classified, retired (Ret)
Red	Did not qualify (DNQ)
Red	Did not pre-qualify (DNPQ)
Black	Disqualified (DSQ)
White	Did not start (DNS)
White	Race cancelled (C)
Blank	Did not practice (DNP)
Blank	Excluded (EX)
Blank	Did not arrive (DNA)
Blank	Withdrawn (WD)
Blank	Did not enter (cell empty)
Text formatting	Meaning
**Bold**	Pole position
Italics	Fastest lap
