= Steve Torrence =

American drag racer

- Nationality: American
- Born: April 17, 1983 (age 43) Longview, Texas, U.S.

NHRA Mission Foods Drag Racing Series career
- Debut season: 2006
- Current team: Torrence Racing
- Crew chief: Richard Hogan
- Championships: 4
- Wins: 60
- Fastest laps: Best ET; 3.636 seconds; Best Speed; 337.50 mph (543.15 km/h)

Championship titles
- 2018, 2019, 2020, 2021: NHRA Top Fuel Champion
- Statistics up to date as of September 15, 2025.

Steve Torrence (born April 17, 1983) is an American professional NHRA Top Fuel Dragster driver for Torrence Racing. Most notably, he was the 2018, 2019, 2020, and 2021 NHRA Top Fuel World Champion. Torrence has had a total of 60 career event wins in 97 career final rounds.
