= Hyundai i30 N TCR =

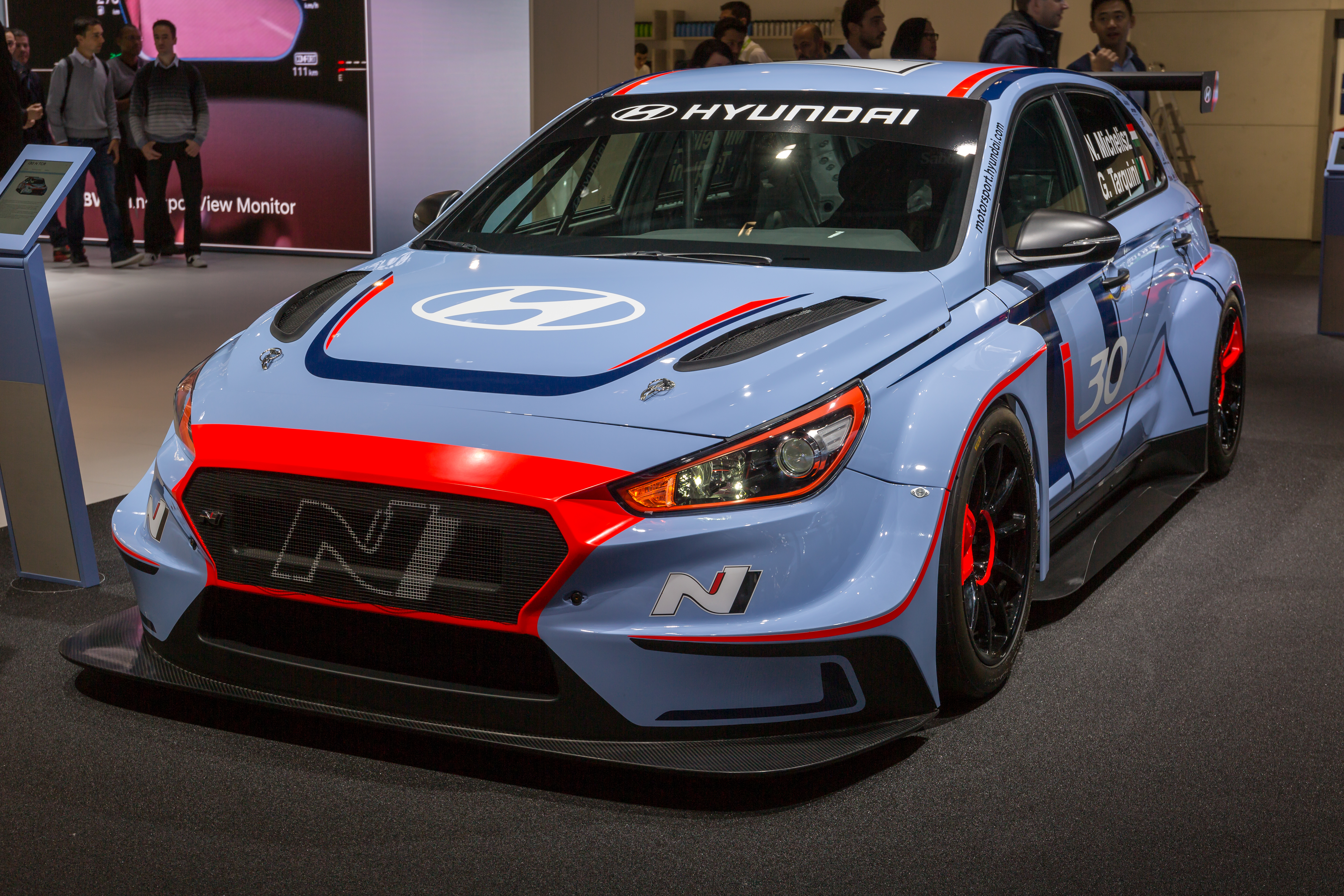
- i30 N TCR at the 2018 Paris Motor Show.
- Category: TCR Touring Car
- Constructor: Hyundai Motorsport

Technical specifications
- Chassis: Hyundai i30
- Length: 4,450 mm (175.2 in)
- Width: 1,950 mm (76.8 in)
- Wheelbase: 2,650 mm (104.3 in)
- Engine: Theta II (G4KH) 1,998 cc (121.9 cu in) 350 hp (261 kW; 355 PS) I4 turbocharged front-mounted, FWD
- Transmission: Xtrac 6-speed Sequential
- Weight: 1,265 kg (2,788.8 lb)

Competition history
- Debut: 2017 TCR International Series Zhejiang round

The Hyundai i30 N TCR is a racing car developed by Hyundai Motorsport, which was built according to the TCR rule system. It is based on the Hyundai i30 5-door hatchback.

The project started in September 2016 with the help of Gabriele Tarquini and Alain Menu and the car completed its first test laps in April 2017. The cars made their debut in the final rounds of the 2017 season of the TCR International Series, but they also set out for testing at this year's 24-hour race in Misano and at the TCR European Cup event on the Adria International Raceway. In addition to the basic model, the car is also available in an Endurance version. In this case, ABS, additional headlights and accessories for external refueling are also included with the car.

The number one target of the i30 N TCR is to race the model on the European continent, while the successor Veloster N TCR is promoted by Hyundai Motorsport in the U.S. and South Korean markets as well as in the Pure ETCR series.

== Championship titles ==
| Year | Title | Competitor |
|---|---|---|
| 2018 | World Touring Car Cup Drivers' championship | (Italy) Gabriele Tarquini |
| 2018 | World Touring Car Cup Teams' championship | (France) M Racing-YMR |
| 2019 | World Touring Car Cup Drivers' championship | (Hungary) Norbert Michelisz |
| 2019 | TCR Europe Touring Car Series Drivers' championship | (United Kingdom) Josh Files |
| 2019 | TCR Europe Touring Car Series Teams' championship | (Italy) Target Competition |
| 2019 | ADAC TCR Germany Touring Car Drivers' championship | (Germany) Max Hesse |
| 2019 | ADAC TCR Germany Touring Car Teams' championship | (Germany) Hyundai Team Engstler |
| 2019 | TCR Russian Series Drivers' championship | (Russia) Dmitry Bragin |
| 2019 | TCR Australia Touring Car Series Drivers' championship | (Australia) Will Brown |
| 2019 | TCR Malaysia Touring Car Drivers' championship | (Germany) Luca Engstler |
| 2019 | TCR Malaysia Touring Car Teams' championship | (Germany) Liqui Moly Team Engstler |
| 2019 | TCR Asia Series Drivers' championship | (Germany) Luca Engstler |
| 2019 | TCR Asia Series Teams' championship | (Germany) Liqui Moly Team Engstler |
| 2020 | TCR Malaysia Touring Car Drivers' championship | (Germany) Luca Engstler |
| 2020 | TCR Malaysia Touring Car Teams' championship | (Germany) Liqui Moly Team Engstler |
| 2020 | ADAC TCR Germany Touring Car Drivers' championship | (Finland) Antti Buri |
| 2020 | ADAC TCR Germany Touring Car Teams' championship | (Austria) HP Racing International |
| 2020 | TCR Eastern Europe Trophy Drivers' championship | (Serbia) Dušan Borković |
| 2020 | TCR Eastern Europe Trophy Teams' championship | (Hungary) M1RA |
| 2020 | TCR UK Series Drivers' championship | (United Kingdom) Lewis Kent |
| 2021 | Touring Car Trophy Drivers' championship | (United Kingdom) Lewis Kent |
| 2021 | TCR UK Series Drivers' championship | (United Kingdom) Lewis Kent |
| 2021 | Supercar Challenge Overall Drivers' championship | (Netherlands) Dennis de Borst (Netherlands) Stan van Oord |
| 2021 | Supercar Challenge Supersport 1 Drivers' championship | (Netherlands) Dennis de Borst (Netherlands) Stan van Oord |
| 2022 | Supercar Challenge Supersport 1 Drivers' championship | (Netherlands) Dennis de Borst |
