= 2019 TCR Malaysia Touring Car Championship =

The 2019 TCR Malaysia Touring Car Championship was the first season of the TCR Malaysia Touring Car Championship. The season began on 19 January at the Sepang International Circuit and ended on 24 February at the same circuit.

== Teams and drivers ==
Yokohama is the official tire supplier.

Team	Car	No.	Drivers	Rounds
(Hong Kong) Prince Racing	Honda Civic Type R TCR (FK8)	2	(Hong Kong) Kenneth Lau	All
(Hong Kong) Prince Racing	Honda Civic Type R TCR (FK8)	7	(Hong Kong) Michael Choi	All
(Germany) Liqui Moly Team Engstler	Volkswagen Golf GTI TCR	3	(Germany) Kai Jordan	All
(Germany) Liqui Moly Team Engstler	Volkswagen Golf GTI TCR	4	(Malaysia) Adam Khalid	1
(Germany) Liqui Moly Team Engstler	Volkswagen Golf GTI TCR	5	(Malaysia) Ahmad Azlee	2
(Germany) Liqui Moly Team Engstler	Volkswagen Golf GTI TCR	9	(Hong Kong) Henry Kwong	1
(Germany) Liqui Moly Team Engstler	Volkswagen Golf GTI TCR	11	(Malaysia) Mark Darwin	3
(Germany) Liqui Moly Team Engstler	Volkswagen Golf GTI TCR	22	(Malaysia) Brendan Anthony	2
(Germany) Liqui Moly Team Engstler	Volkswagen Golf GTI TCR	29	(Malaysia) Mitchell Cheah	3
(Germany) Liqui Moly Team Engstler	Hyundai i30 N TCR	8	(Germany) Luca Engstler	All
(Germany) Liqui Moly Team Engstler	Hyundai i30 N TCR	26	(Hong Kong) Michael Soong	2–3
(Germany) Liqui Moly Team Engstler	Hyundai i30 N TCR	27	(France) Théo Coicaud	1
(Hong Kong) Teamwork Motorsport	Volkswagen Golf GTI TCR	10	(Hong Kong) Cherry Cheung	3
(Hong Kong) Teamwork Motorsport	Volkswagen Golf GTI TCR	12	(United Kingdom) Robert Huff	1
(Slovakia) Brutal Fish Racing Team	Volkswagen Golf GTI TCR	17	(Slovakia) Martin Ryba	All
(Hong Kong) Maximum Racing	Honda Civic Type R TCR (FK2)	23	(Hong Kong) Garry Cheung	1
(Hong Kong) Maximum Racing	Honda Civic Type R TCR (FK2)	23	(Hong Kong) David Lau	1
(Hong Kong) KCMG	Honda Civic Type R TCR (FK8)	51	(Hong Kong) Paul Ip	All
(Malaysia) Viper Niza Racing	CUPRA León TCR	65	(Malaysia) Douglas Khoo	All
(Malaysia) Viper Niza Racing	CUPRA León TCR	80	(Russia) Andrei Abaluev	3
(South Korea) Indigo Racing	Hyundai i30 N TCR	97	(South Korea) Charlie Kang	1

== Calendar and results ==
The calendar was released on 10 October 2018, with all rounds being held within Malaysia.

Rnd.		Circuit	Date	Pole position	Fastest lap	Winning driver	Winning team	Supporting
1	1	Sepang International Circuit, Kuala Lumpur	20 January	(United Kingdom) Robert Huff	(Germany) Luca Engstler	(Germany) Luca Engstler	(Germany) Liqui Moly Team Engstler	F3 Asian Championship Winter Series
1	2	Sepang International Circuit, Kuala Lumpur	20 January		(Germany) Luca Engstler	(Germany) Luca Engstler	(Germany) Liqui Moly Team Engstler	F3 Asian Championship Winter Series
2	3	Sepang International Circuit, Kuala Lumpur	26 January	(Germany) Luca Engstler	(Germany) Luca Engstler	(Germany) Luca Engstler	(Germany) Liqui Moly Team Engstler	
2	4	Sepang International Circuit, Kuala Lumpur	26 January		(Germany) Luca Engstler	(Germany) Luca Engstler	(Germany) Liqui Moly Team Engstler	
3	5	Sepang International Circuit, Kuala Lumpur	23–24 February	(Malaysia) Mitchell Cheah	(Germany) Luca Engstler	(Malaysia) Mitchell Cheah	(Germany) Liqui Moly Team Engstler	Asian Le Mans Series; F3 Asian Championship Winter Series
3	6	Sepang International Circuit, Kuala Lumpur	23–24 February		(Germany) Luca Engstler	(Germany) Luca Engstler	(Germany) Liqui Moly Team Engstler	Asian Le Mans Series; F3 Asian Championship Winter Series

== Championship standings ==
=== Drivers' championship ===
Pos	Driver	SEP1		SEP2†		SEP3		Points
1	(Germany) Luca Engstler	1^{2}	1	1^{1}	1	2^{3}	1	142.5
2	(Germany) Kai Jordan	5	3	2^{3}	2	Ret^{5}	4	68
3	(Slovakia) Martin Ryba	3	8	4	5	6	5	53
4	(Malaysia) Mitchell Cheah					1^{1}	2	48
5	(Hong Kong) Paul Ip	Ret^{4}	6	3^{2}	Ret	3^{4}	7	44.5
6	(Malaysia) Douglas Khoo	4	7	8	4	10^{2}	10	38
7	(Hong Kong) Michael Choi	8	10	9	6	7	3	35
8	(United Kingdom) Robert Huff	2^{1}	5					33
9	(Hong Kong) Kenneth Lau	9	11	6^{4}	7	5	DSQ	24
10	(Malaysia) Brendan Anthony			5	3			20
11	(Malaysia) Adam Khalid	6	4					20
12	(Malaysia) Mark Darwin					4	6	20
13	(South Korea) Charlie Kang	Ret^{5}	2					19
14	(Hong Kong) Michael Soong			Ret^{5}	DNS	8	8	9
15	(Hong Kong) Henry Kwong	7	9					8
16	(Hong Kong) Cherry Cheung					9	9	4
17	(Malaysia) Ahmad Azlee			7	Ret			3
18	(France) Théo Coicaud	Ret^{3}	DNS					3
19	(Hong Kong) Garry Cheung	10						1
20	(Russia) Andrei Abaluev					Ret	Ret	0
21	(Hong Kong) David Lau		DNS					0
Pos	Driver	SEP1		SEP2†		SEP3		Points

† — In the first race of the second round, half points after a stopped race.

==== Team's Standings ====
Pos.	Team	SEP1		SEP2†		SEP3		Pts.
1	(Germany) Liqui Moly Team Engstler	1^{2}	1	1^{1}	1	1^{1}	1	248,5
1	(Germany) Liqui Moly Team Engstler	5^{3}	3	2^{3}	2	2^{3}	2	248,5
2	(Hong Kong) Prince Racing	8	10	6^{4}	6	5	3	83
2	(Hong Kong) Prince Racing	9	11	9	7	7	DSQ	83
3	(Slovakia) Brutal Fish Racing Team	3	8	4	5	6	5	61
4	(Malaysia) Viper Niza Racing	4	7	8^{5}	4	10^{2}	10	55
4	(Malaysia) Viper Niza Racing					Ret^{5}	Ret	55
5	(Hong Kong) KCMG	Ret^{4}	6	3^{2}	Ret	3^{4}	7	50,5
6	(Hong Kong) Teamwork Motorsport	2^{1}	5			9	9	49
7	(South Korea) Indigo Racing	Ret^{5}	2					19
8	(Hong Kong) Maximum Racing	10	DNS					4
Pos	Driver	SEP1		SEP2†		SEP3		Points
