= 2020 TCR Malaysia Touring Car Championship =

The 2020 TCR Malaysia Touring Car Championship was the second season of the TCR Malaysia Touring Car Championship. A three-round season will be held at Sepang International Circuit from 18 January to 1 March. Luca Engstler became the Drivers' champion with an equal number of points with Dan Lloyd, ahead of wins four to one.

== Teams and drivers ==
Yokohama is the official tire supplier.

Team	Car	No.	Drivers	Class	Rounds	Ref.
(Germany) Hyundai Team Engstler	Hyundai i30 N TCR	1	(Germany) Luca Engstler		All	
(Germany) Hyundai Team Engstler	Hyundai i30 N TCR	2	(Austria) Nicolas Gruber		1−2	
(Germany) Hyundai Team Engstler	Hyundai i30 N TCR	27	(Malaysia) Mitchell Cheah		3	
(Germany) Hyundai Team Engstler	Hyundai i30 N TCR	777	(Australia) Declan Fraser		1	
(Malaysia) Viper Niza Racing	CUPRA León TCR	3	(Malaysia) Freddie Ang		1, 3	
(Malaysia) Viper Niza Racing	CUPRA León TCR	36	(Malaysia) Gilbert Ang		All	
(Malaysia) Viper Niza Racing	CUPRA León TCR	65	(Malaysia) Douglas Khoo	Cup	All	
(Hong Kong) KCMG	Honda Civic Type R TCR (FK8)	8	(Hong Kong) Tommy Ku	Cup	2−3	
(Hong Kong) Teamwork Huff Motorsport	Audi RS 3 LMS TCR	33	(China) Yang Xi	Cup	1	
(South Korea) Solite Indigo Racing	Hyundai i30 N TCR	97	(South Korea) Kim Jinsoo		3	
(South Korea) Solite Indigo Racing	Hyundai i30 N TCR	99	(United Kingdom) Josh Files		2	
(South Korea) Solite Indigo Racing	Hyundai Veloster N TCR	99	(United Kingdom) Josh Files		3	
(Slovakia) Brutal Fish Racing Team	Honda Civic Type R TCR (FK8)	123	(United Kingdom) Daniel Lloyd		All	

== Calendar and results ==
The calendar was released on 25 July 2019 with all rounds being held within Malaysia.

Rnd.		Circuit	Date	Pole position	Fastest lap	Winning driver	Winning team	Cup winner	Supporting
1	1	Sepang International Circuit, Kuala Lumpur	18 January	(Germany) Luca Engstler	(United Kingdom) Daniel Lloyd	(Germany) Luca Engstler	(Germany) Hyundai Team Engstler	(China) Yang Xi	
1	2	Sepang International Circuit, Kuala Lumpur	18 January		(Germany) Luca Engstler	(Austria) Nicolas Gruber	(Germany) Hyundai Team Engstler	(China) Yang Xi	
2	3	Sepang International Circuit, Kuala Lumpur	15 February	(United Kingdom) Daniel Lloyd*	(Germany) Luca Engstler	(Germany) Luca Engstler	(Germany) Hyundai Team Engstler	(Malaysia) Douglas Khoo	Asian Le Mans Series; F3 Asian Championship
2	4	Sepang International Circuit, Kuala Lumpur	15 February		(Germany) Luca Engstler	(United Kingdom) Daniel Lloyd	(Slovakia) Brutal Fish Racing Team	(Malaysia) Douglas Khoo	Asian Le Mans Series; F3 Asian Championship
3	5	Sepang International Circuit, Kuala Lumpur	1 March	(Germany) Luca Engstler	(United Kingdom) Daniel Lloyd	(Germany) Luca Engstler	(Germany) Hyundai Team Engstler	(Malaysia) Douglas Khoo	
3	6	Sepang International Circuit, Kuala Lumpur	1 March		(Malaysia) Mitchel Cheah	(Germany) Luca Engstler	(Germany) Hyundai Team Engstler	(Malaysia) Douglas Khoo	

== Championship standings ==
=== Drivers' championship ===
Pos	Driver	SEP1		SEP2		SEP3		Points
Pos	Driver	RD1	RD2	RD1	RD2	RD1	RD2	Points
1	(Germany) Luca Engstler	1^{1}	7	1^{1}	Ret	1^{1}	1	121
2	(United Kingdom) Daniel Lloyd	2^{2}	2	2^{2}	1	2^{2}	4	121
3	(Malaysia) Gilbert Ang	3^{3}	3	3	2	4^{5}	5	89
4	(United Kingdom) Josh Files			4^{4}	3	7^{4}	2	55
5	(Austria) Nicolas Gruber	Ret	1	5^{3}	4			50
6	(Malaysia) Douglas Khoo	6	8	6^{5}	5	8	8	39
7	(Malaysia) Freddie Ang	4^{5}	5			6	7	37
8	(Malaysia) Mitchel Cheah					3^{3}	3	33
9	(Australia) Declan Fraser	7^{4}	4					20
10	(China) Yang Xi	5	6					18
11	(South Korea) Kim Jinsoo					5	6	18
12	(Hong Kong) Tommy Ku			7	6	Ret	Ret	14
Pos	Driver	SEP1		SEP2		SEP3		Points

=== Cup championship ===
Pos	Driver	SEP1		SEP2		SEP3		Points
Pos	Driver	RD1	RD2	RD1	RD2	RD1	RD2	Points
1	(Malaysia) Douglas Khoo	6^{1}	8	6^{1}	5	8^{1}	8	151
2	(China) Yang Xi	5^{2}	6					54
3	(Hong Kong) Tommy Ku			7^{2}	6	Ret	Ret	40
Pos	Driver	SEP1		SEP2		SEP3		Points

==== Team's Standings ====
Pos.	Team	SEP1		SEP2		SEP3		Pts.
Pos.	Team	RD1	RD2	RD1	RD2	RD1	RD2	Pts.
1	(Germany) Hyundai Team Engstler	1^{1}	1	1^{1}	4	1^{1}	1	220
1	(Germany) Hyundai Team Engstler	7^{4}	4	5^{3}	Ret	3^{3}	3	220
2	(Malaysia) Viper Niza Racing	3^{3}	3	3^{5}	2	4^{5}	5	145
2	(Malaysia) Viper Niza Racing	4^{5}	5	6	5	6	7	145
3	(Slovakia) Brutal Fish Racing Team	2^{2}	2	2^{2}	1	2^{2}	4	121
4	(South Korea) Solite Indigo Racing			4^{4}	3	5^{4}	2	73
4	(South Korea) Solite Indigo Racing					7	6	73
5	(Hong Kong) Teamwork Huff Motorsport	5	6					18
Teams ineligible to score points
-	(Hong Kong) KCMG			7	6	Ret	Ret	0
Pos	Driver	SEP1		SEP2		SEP3		Points
