= ADAC TCR Germany Touring Car Championship =

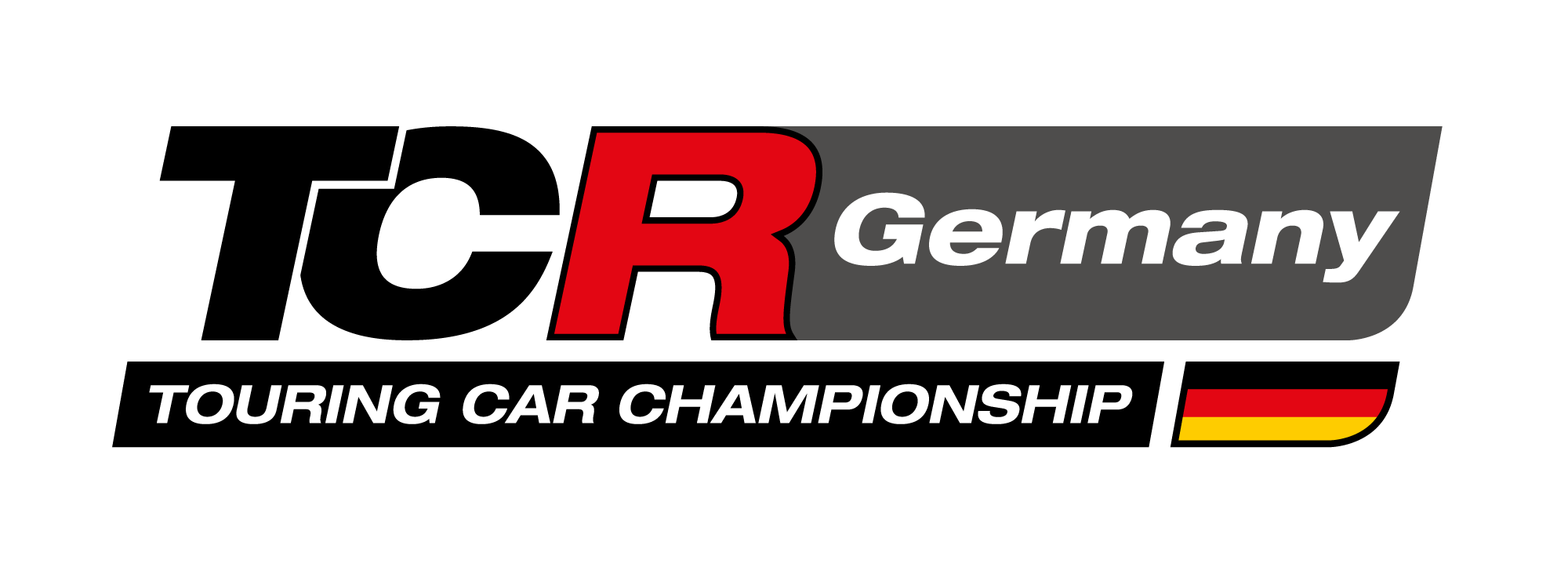
- Category: Touring cars
- Country: Germany
- Inaugural season: 2015
- Drivers' champion: Luca Engstler
- Teams' champion: Hyundai Team Engstler
- Official website: https://www.adac-motorsport.de/adac-tcr-germany

The ADAC TCR Germany Touring Car Championship is a touring car racing series based in Germany.

== History ==
On 16 September 2015, the German Series was launched by ADAC and Engstler Motorsport, who already run in the International Series. The new category runs in the same events as ADAC GT Masters and ADAC Formula 4 as well as Deutscher Tourenwagen Cup (formerly ADAC Procar) until the series was disbanded in 2016.

== Champions ==
Drivers' Champions				Teams' Champions	
Year	Driver	Team	Car	Team	Car
2016	(United Kingdom) Josh Files	(Italy) Target Competition	SEAT León Cup Racer; Honda Civic TCR H56	(Italy) Target Competition	SEAT León Cup Racer; Honda Civic TCR H56
2017	(United Kingdom) Josh Files	(Italy) Target Competition UK-SUI	Honda Civic TCR H56	(Italy) Target Competition UK-SUI	Honda Civic TCR H56
2018	(Austria) Harald Proczyk	(Austria) HP Racing International	Opel Astra TCR	(Austria) HP Racing International	Opel Astra TCR
2019	(Germany) Max Hesse	(Germany) Hyundai Team Engstler	Hyundai i30 N TCR	(Germany) Hyundai Team Engstler	Hyundai i30 N TCR
2020	(Finland) Antti Buri	(Germany) Hyundai Team Engstler	Hyundai i30 N TCR	(Austria) HP Racing International	Hyundai i30 N TCR
2021	(Germany) Luca Engstler	(Germany) Hyundai Team Engstler	Hyundai i30 N TCR	(Germany) Hyundai Team Engstler	Hyundai i30 N TCR
2022	(Denmark) Martin Andersen	(Germany) Liqui Moly Team Engstler	Honda Civic TCR H70	(Germany) Liqui Moly Team Engstler	Honda Civic TCR H70
