= TCR Malaysia Touring Car Championship =

- Category: Touring cars
- Country: Malaysia
- Inaugural season: 2019
- Folded: 2020

The TCR Malaysia Touring Car Championship was a former touring car racing series based in Malaysia.

== History ==
It was announced by Motorsport Asia Limited, which also organizes the TCR Asia Series, that on October 10, 2018, the creation of TCR Malaysia for the beginning of the year 2019. The championship served as preparation for other championships as the TCR Asia. There are scheduled 3 rounds with 6 races all held at the Sepang International Circuit, in supporting of GT Masters/Formula 3 Asia Winter Series and Asian Le Mans Series.

== Champions ==
Drivers' Champions				Teams' Champions	
Year	Driver	Team	Car	Team	Car
2019	(Germany) Luca Engstler	(Germany) Liqui Moly Team Engstler	Hyundai i30 N TCR	(Germany) Liqui Moly Team Engstler	Hyundai i30 N TCR; Volkswagen Golf GTI TCR
2020	(Germany) Luca Engstler	(Germany) Hyundai Team Engstler	Hyundai i30 N TCR	(Germany) Hyundai Team Engstler	Hyundai i30 N TCR
