= 2021 ADAC TCR Germany Touring Car Championship =

German touring car racing series

The 2021 ADAC TCR Germany Touring Car Championship was the sixth season of touring car racing to be run by the German-based sanctioning body ADAC to the TCR regulations.

Antti Buri was the defending Drivers' champion and HP Racing International was the defending Teams' champions. This year Luca Engstler and Hyundai Team Engstler won.

== Teams and drivers ==
Yokohama is the official tire supplier.

Team	Car	No.	Drivers	Class	Rounds	Ref.
(Austria) Wimmer Werk Motorsport	Audi RS 3 LMS TCR	5	(Austria) Peter Gross	T	1–6	
(Austria) Wimmer Werk Motorsport	Cupra León TCR	21	(Poland) Szymon Ładniak	J	5	
(Austria) Wimmer Werk Motorsport	Cupra León Competición TCR	6	(Italy) Eric Scalvini		All	
(Austria) Wimmer Werk Motorsport	Cupra León Competición TCR	56	(Austria) Günter Benninger	T	1–6	
(Austria) Wimmer Werk Motorsport	Cupra León Competición TCR	99	(Austria) Christian Voithofer	T	1–6	
(Germany) Hyundai Team Engstler	Hyundai i30 N TCR	8	(Germany) Luca Engstler		1–6	
(Germany) Hyundai Team Engstler	Hyundai i30 N TCR	9	(Germany) Roland Hertner	T	1–5, 7	
(Germany) Hyundai Team Engstler	Hyundai i30 N TCR	19	(Denmark) Martin Andersen		All	
(Germany) Hyundai Team Engstler	Hyundai i30 N TCR	97	(Austria) Nicolas Gruber	J	All	
(Poland) Albert Legutko Racing	Honda Civic Type R TCR (FK2)	17	(Poland) Albert Legutko	J	All	
(Spain) RC2 Junior Team	Cupra León Competición TCR	20	(Spain) Rubén Fernández	T	6	
(Spain) RC2 Junior Team	Cupra León Competición TCR	37	(Venezuela) Sergio Lopez Bolotin		6	
(Poland) JP Motorsport	Volkswagen Golf GTI TCR	21	(Poland) Szymon Ładniak	J	1–3	
(Germany) Halder Motorsport	Honda Civic Type R TCR (FK8)	21	(Poland) Szymon Ładniak	J	6–7	
(Germany) ROJA Motorsport by ASL Lichtblau	Hyundai i30 N TCR	22	(Germany) Robin Jahr		All	
(Austria) MAIR Racing Osttirol	Audi RS 3 LMS TCR	23	(Austria) Sandro Soubek		2	
(Lithuania) NordPass	Hyundai i30 N TCR	27	(Lithuania) Jonas Karklys		All	
(Germany) Lubner Motorsport	Opel Astra TCR	33	(Germany) Philipp Regensperger	J	All	
(Germany) Lubner Motorsport	Opel Astra TCR	44	(Austria) Andreas Höfler	T	2	
(Germany) Lubner Motorsport	Opel Astra TCR	66	(Austria) Mario Klammer		2	
(Germany) RaceSing	Hyundai i30 N TCR	34	(Germany) Patrick Sing		1–3, 5–7	
(Germany) Team Honda ADAC Sachsen	Honda Civic Type R TCR (FK8)	47	(Germany) Christopher Röhner	J	3, 5	
(Germany) Team Honda ADAC Sachsen	Honda Civic Type R TCR (FK8)	55	(Germany) Marcel Fugel		All	
(Germany) Team Honda ADAC Sachsen	Honda Civic Type R TCR (FK8)	88	(Germany) Dominik Fugel		All	
(Germany) Volkswagen Team Oettinger	Volkswagen Golf GTI TCR	80	(Germany) René Kircher	J	1–6	

Icon	Class
J	Eligible for the Honda Junior Challenge
T	Eligible for ADAC TCR Germany Trophy

== Calendar and results ==
The round at Nürburgring planned in early August was postponed after massive flooding in Germany. The new date was set to 6–7 November, making its the series finale.

Rnd.		Circuit	Date	Pole position	Fastest lap	Winning driver	Winning team	Junior winner	Trophy winner
1	1	(Germany) Motorsport Arena Oschersleben, Oschersleben	15-16 May	(Denmark) Martin Andersen	(Germany) Luca Engstler	(Germany) Luca Engstler	(Germany) Hyundai Team Engstler	(Austria) Nicolas Gruber	(Germany) Roland Hertner
1	2	(Germany) Motorsport Arena Oschersleben, Oschersleben	15-16 May	(Germany) Luca Engstler	(Germany) Luca Engstler	(Germany) Luca Engstler	(Germany) Hyundai Team Engstler	(Austria) Nicolas Gruber	(Germany) Roland Hertner
2	3	(Austria) Red Bull Ring, Spielberg	12-13 June	(Italy) Eric Scalvini	(Italy) Eric Scalvini	(Italy) Eric Scalvini	(Austria) Wimmer Werk Motorsport	(Germany) René Kircher	(Austria) Günter Benninger
2	4	(Austria) Red Bull Ring, Spielberg	12-13 June	(Italy) Eric Scalvini	(Italy) Eric Scalvini	(Italy) Eric Scalvini	(Austria) Wimmer Werk Motorsport	(Austria) Nicolas Gruber	(Austria) Günter Benninger
3	5	(Germany) Lausitzring, Klettwitz	11-12 September	(Germany) Luca Engstler	(Germany) Luca Engstler	(Germany) Luca Engstler	(Germany) Hyundai Team Engstler	(Austria) Nicolas Gruber	(Germany) Roland Hertner
3	6	(Germany) Lausitzring, Klettwitz	11-12 September	(Denmark) Martin Andersen	(Germany) Luca Engstler	(Germany) Luca Engstler	(Germany) Hyundai Team Engstler	(Austria) Nicolas Gruber	(Germany) Roland Hertner
4	7	(Germany) Hockenheimring, Hockenheim	18-19 September	(Italy) Eric Scalvini	(Italy) Eric Scalvini	(Italy) Eric Scalvini	(Austria) Wimmer Werk Motorsport	(Austria) Nicolas Gruber	(Germany) Roland Hertner
4	8	(Germany) Hockenheimring, Hockenheim	18-19 September	(Germany) Luca Engstler	(Italy) Eric Scalvini	(Germany) Luca Engstler	(Germany) Hyundai Team Engstler	(Austria) Nicolas Gruber	(Germany) Roland Hertner
5	9	(Germany) Sachsenring, Hohenstein-Ernstthal	2-3 October	(Germany) Dominik Fugel	(Germany) Dominik Fugel	(Germany) Dominik Fugel	(Germany) Team Honda ADAC Sachsen	(Germany) René Kircher	(Germany) Roland Hertner
5	10	(Germany) Sachsenring, Hohenstein-Ernstthal	2-3 October	(Germany) Dominik Fugel	(Germany) Dominik Fugel	(Germany) Dominik Fugel	(Germany) Team Honda ADAC Sachsen	(Austria) Nicolas Gruber	(Germany) Roland Hertner
6	11	(Germany) Hockenheimring, Hockenheim	23-24 October	(Germany) Luca Engstler	(Germany) Luca Engstler	(Germany) Luca Engstler	(Germany) Hyundai Team Engstler	(Poland) Albert Legutko	(Austria) Christian Voithofer (Note: Actual Trophy winner was guest driver Rubén Fernández from RC2 Junior Team.)
6	12	(Germany) Hockenheimring, Hockenheim	23-24 October	(Italy) Eric Scalvini	(Italy) Eric Scalvini	(Italy) Eric Scalvini	(Austria) Wimmer Werk Motorsport	(Austria) Nicolas Gruber	(Austria) Peter Gross
7	13	(Germany) Nürburgring, Nürburg	6-7 November	(Denmark) Martin Andersen	(Denmark) Martin Andersen	(Denmark) Martin Andersen	(Germany) Hyundai Team Engstler	(Austria) Nicolas Gruber	(Germany) Roland Hertner
7	14	(Germany) Nürburgring, Nürburg	6-7 November	(Germany) Marcel Fugel	(Lithuania) Jonas Karklys	(Lithuania) Jonas Karklys	(Lithuania) NordPass	(Poland) Szymon Ładniak	(Germany) Roland Hertner

=== Drivers' Championship ===
Scoring systems

Position	1st	2nd	3rd	4th	5th	6th	7th	8th	9th	10th	11th	12th	13th	14th	15th
Race points	25	20	16	13	11	10	9	8	7	6	5	4	3	2	1
Qualification points	10	8	6	5	4	3	2	1							

Pos.	Driver	OSC (Germany)		RBR (Austria)		LAU (Germany)		HOC1 (Germany)		SAC (Germany)		HOC2 (Germany)		NÜR (Germany)		Pts.
1	(Germany) Luca Engstler	1^{2}	**1**^{1}	2^{2}	3^{3}	**1**	1	2	**1**	16	2	**1**	4			337
2	(Denmark) Martin Andersen	**6**^{1}	13^{3}	5^{4}	6^{8}	2	**2**	4	5	2	4	3	5	**1**	5	286
3	(Germany) Dominik Fugel	2^{3}	3^{5}	3^{5}	2^{2}	8	3	3	Ret	**1**	**1**	4	2	4	4	285
4	(Italy) Eric Scalvini	4	5^{4}	**1**^{1}	**1**^{1}	6	7	**1**	2	13	6	7	**1**	11	DNS	263
5	(Austria) Nicolas Gruber	5^{5}	2^{2}	11	5^{7}	4	4	5	3	12	3	11	8	3	3	218
6	(Lithuania) Jonas Karklys	8^{6}	6	8	7	3	8	6	4	10	7	2	6	7	1	197
7	(Germany) Marcel Fugel	3^{4}	7^{7}	4^{3}	16^{4}	5	5	Ret	12	15	14	8	3	2	**Ret**	175
8	(Germany) Robin Jahr	13	8^{8}	6^{8}	8	11	6	9	8	7	5	5	7	5	9	132
9	(Germany) Philipp Regensperger	7^{8}	12	10^{7}	Ret^{5}	9	9	13†	7	6	8	17†	DNS	Ret	10	96
10	(Germany) René Kircher	11^{7}	4^{6}	7^{6}	14^{6}	Ret	DNS	Ret	9	3	9	16	DNS			86
11	(Germany) Patrick Sing	9	14	9	4	15	Ret			4	Ret	12	9	6	8	78
12	(Germany) Roland Hertner	14	10	16	15	10	11	7	10	8	12	DNS	DNS	9	7	77
13	(Poland) Szymon Ładniak	12	11	14	10	17	Ret			9	13	Ret	14	8	2	70
14	(Poland) Albert Legutko	10	9	15	DNS	16	14	12	6	Ret	11	9	15†	10	6	66
15	(Austria) Peter Gross	Ret	Ret	Ret	Ret	12	12	8	11	11	DNS	14	11			39
16	(Austria) Günter Benninger	15	16	12	9	14	Ret	11	13	14	Ret	15	13			32
17	(Austria) Christian Voithofer	16	15	17	13	13	13	10	14	Ret	DNS	13	12			32
Drivers ineligible to score points
-	(Austria) Christopher Röhner					7	10			5	10					-
-	(Spain) Rubén Fernández											6	Ret			-
-	(Venezuela) Sergio Lopez Bolotin											10	10			-
-	(Austria) Sandro Soubek			Ret	11											-
-	(Austria) Mario Klammer			18†	12											-
-	(Austria) Andreas Höfler			13	Ret											-
Pos.	Driver	OSC (Germany)		RBR (Austria)		LAU (Germany)		HOC1 (Germany)		SAC (Germany)		HOC2 (Germany)		NÜR (Germany)		Pts.

Colour	Result
Gold	Winner
Silver	Second place
Bronze	Third place
Green	Points classification
Blue	Non-points classification
Blue	Non-classified finish (NC)
Purple	Retired, not classified (Ret)
Red	Did not qualify (DNQ)
Red	Did not pre-qualify (DNPQ)
Black	Disqualified (DSQ)
White	Did not start (DNS)
White	Withdrew (WD)
White	Race cancelled (C)
Blank	Did not practice (DNP)
Blank	Did not arrive (DNA)
Blank	Excluded (EX)

**Bold** – Pole
Italics – Fastest Lap

=== Teams' Championship ===
Pos.	Team	OSC (Germany)		RBR (Austria)		LAU (Germany)		HOC1 (Germany)		SAC (Germany)		HOC2 (Germany)		NÜR (Germany)		Pts.
1	(Germany) Hyundai Team Engstler	1^{2}	**1**^{1}	2^{2}	3^{3}	**1**	1	2	**1**	8	2	**1**	4	3	3	588
1	(Germany) Hyundai Team Engstler	5^{2}	2^{2}	5	5	2	**2**	4	3	2	3	3	5	1**1**	5	588
2	(Germany) Team Honda ADAC Sachsen	2^{3}	3	3	2	8	3	3	Ret	**1**	**1**	4	2	4	4	381
2	(Germany) Team Honda ADAC Sachsen	3	7	4	16	5	5	Ret	12	15	14	8	3	2	**Ret**	381
3	(Austria) Wimmer Werk Motorsport	4	5^{3}	1	1	6	7	**1**	2	11	6	7	**1**	11	DNS	283
3	(Austria) Wimmer Werk Motorsport	15	15	12	9	12	12	8	11	14	DNS	14	11			283
4	(Lithuania) NordPass	8	6	8	7	3	8	6	4	10	7	2	6	7	1	168
5	(Germany) ROJA Motorsport by ASL Lichtblau	13	8	6	8	11	6	9	8	7	5	5	7	5	9	86
6	(Germany) RaceSing	9	14	9	4	15	Ret			4	Ret	12	9	6	8	75
7	(Germany) Lubner Motorsport	7	12	10	Ret	9	9	13†	7	6	8	17†	DNS	Ret	10	69
8	(Germany) Volkswagen Team Oettinger	11	4	7	14	Ret	DNS	Ret	9	3	9	16	DNS			64
9	(Poland) Albert Legutko Racing	10	9	15	DNS	16	14	12	6	Ret	11	9	15†	10	6	59
10	(Germany) Halder Motorsport									9	13	Ret	14	8	2	40
11	(Poland) JP Motorsport	12	11	14	10	17	Ret									22
Teams ineligible to score points
-	(Austria) Mair Racing Osttirol			Ret	11											-
-	(Germany) Lubner Motorsport			13	12											-
-	(Germany) Lubner Motorsport			18†	Ret											-
-	(Germany) Team Honda ADAC Sachsen					7	10			5	10					-
-	(Spain) RC2 Junior Team											6	Ret			-
-	(Spain) RC2 Junior Team											10	10			-
Pos.	Team	OSC (Germany)		RBR (Austria)		LAU (Germany)		HOC1 (Germany)		SAC (Germany)		HOC2 (Germany)		NÜR (Germany)		Pts.
