= 2019 TCR China Touring Car Championship =

The 2019 TCR China season was the third season of the TCR's Chinese Touring Car Championship.

== Teams and drivers ==
Team	Car	No.	Drivers	Rounds
(China) Team Artka	Volkswagen Golf GTI TCR	2	(China) Yan Chuang	4
(Germany) Hyundai Team Engstler	Hyundai i30 N TCR	8	(Germany) Luca Engstler	4−5
(Macau) Dongfeng Honda MacPro Racing Team	Honda Civic Type R TCR (FK8)	12	(China) Zou Si Rui	3
(Macau) Dongfeng Honda MacPro Racing Team	Honda Civic Type R TCR (FK8)	16	(Macau) André Couto	4−5
(Macau) Dongfeng Honda MacPro Racing Team	Honda Civic Type R TCR (FK8)	55	(China) Martin Xie	All
(Macau) Dongfeng Honda MacPro Racing Team	Honda Civic Type R TCR (FK8)	77	(United Kingdom) Daniel Lloyd	All
(China) Champ x T. A. Motorsport	Audi RS 3 LMS TCR	26	(Macau) Filipe de Souza	1−2
(China) Champ x T. A. Motorsport	Audi RS 3 LMS TCR	48	(Hong Kong) James Wong	2−5
(China) Champ x T. A. Motorsport	Volkswagen Golf GTI TCR	35	(China) Edward Chen	4
(China) Champ x T. A. Motorsport	Volkswagen Golf GTI TCR	53	(Hong Kong) Mike Ng	5
(China) Champ x T. A. Motorsport	Volkswagen Golf GTI TCR	66	(Hong Kong) Michael Wong	2
(China) Liqui Moly Team NewFaster	CUPRA León TCR	33	(Macau) Alex Liu	1−2, 5
(China) Liqui Moly Team NewFaster	Audi RS 3 LMS TCR	81	(China) Huang Chu Han	All
(China) Liqui Moly Team NewFaster	Audi RS 3 LMS TCR	86	(Hong Kong) Kenneth Look	All
(China) Leo Racing Volkswagen Team Oettinger	Volkswagen Golf GTI TCR	99	(China) Li Lin	1−2
Guest drivers ineligible to score points
(United Kingdom) Team MG XPower	MG 6 X-Power TCR	9	(Macau) Rodolfo Ávila	3−4
(United Kingdom) Team MG XPower	MG 6 X-Power TCR	18	(China) Zhendong Zhang	3−5

== Calendar and results ==
Rnd.		Circuit	Date	Pole position	Fastest lap	Winning driver	Winning team	Supporting
1	1	Zhuhai International Circuit	3 May	(United Kingdom) Daniel Lloyd	(United Kingdom) Daniel Lloyd	(United Kingdom) Daniel Lloyd	(Macau) Dongfeng Honda MacPro Racing Team	TCR Asia Series
1	2	Zhuhai International Circuit	4 May		(China) Martin Xie	(China) Huang Chu Han	(China) Liqui Moly Team NewFaster	TCR Asia Series
2	3	Shanghai International Circuit	1 June	(China) Martin Xie	(China) Martin Xie	(United Kingdom) Daniel Lloyd	(Macau) Dongfeng Honda MacPro Racing Team	TCR Asia Series
2	4	Shanghai International Circuit	2 June		(United Kingdom) Daniel Lloyd	(United Kingdom) Daniel Lloyd	(Macau) Dongfeng Honda MacPro Racing Team	TCR Asia Series
3	5	Zhejiang International Circuit	6 July	(United Kingdom) Daniel Lloyd	(China) Huang Chu Han	(China) Huang Chu Han	(China) Liqui Moly Team NewFaster	TCR Asia Series
3	6	Zhejiang International Circuit	7 July		(China) Huang Chu Han	(China) Huang Chu Han	(China) Liqui Moly Team NewFaster	TCR Asia Series
4	7	Ningbo International Circuit	14 September	(Germany) Luca Engstler	(Germany) Luca Engstler	(Germany) Luca Engstler	(Germany) Hyundai Team Engstler	World Touring Car Cup
4	8	Ningbo International Circuit	15 September		(Germany) Luca Engstler	(Germany) Luca Engstler	(Germany) Hyundai Team Engstler	World Touring Car Cup
5	9	Zhuzhou International Circuit	26 October	(Germany) Luca Engstler	(United Kingdom) Daniel Lloyd	(Germany) Luca Engstler	(Germany) Hyundai Team Engstler	China Touring Car Championship
5	10	Zhuzhou International Circuit	27 October		(Germany) Luca Engstler	(United Kingdom) Daniel Lloyd	(Macau) Dongfeng Honda MacPro Racing Team	China Touring Car Championship

== Championship standings ==
=== Drivers' championship ===
Scoring systems

Position	1st	2nd	3rd	4th	5th	6th	7th	8th	9th	10th	11th	12th	PP	FL
Race 1	18	15	13	11	9	7	6	5	4	3	2	1	**0**	0
Race 2	20	17	14	12	10	8	6	5	4	3	2	1	**0**	0

Pos.	Driver	ZHU (China)		SHA (China)		ZHE (China)		NIN (China)		ZHZ (China)		Pts.
Pos.	Driver	RD1	RD2	RD1	RD2	RD1	RD2	RD1	RD2	RD1	RD2	Pts.
1	(China) Huang Chu Han	9	5	6	6	3	4	5	2	5	6	142
2	(United Kingdom) Daniel Lloyd	**3**	7	1	3	**DSQ**	6	2	Ret	2	1	140
3	(Hong Kong) Kenneth Look	11	11	10	14	8	11	7	6	6	4	104
4	(China) Martin Xie	6	Ret	**3**	Ret	10	16	3	Ret	4	3	85
5	(Germany) Luca Engstler							**1**	1	**1**	2	73
6	(Macau) Alex Liu	14	9	16	15					7	8	49
7	(Hong Kong) James Wong			17	17	15	17	11	7	8	9	45
8	(Macau) André Couto							4	Ret	3	Ret	24
9	(China) Li Lin	Ret	8	13	Ret							23
10	(Macau) Filipe de Souza	4	Ret	20†	Ret							19
11	(China) Zou Si Rui					13	14					17
12	(China) Yan Chuang							9	5			14
13	(Hong Kong) Michael Wong			18	18							13
14	(Hong Kong) Mike Ng									9	7	10
15	(China) Edward Chen							8	DSQ			5
Drivers ineligible to score points
-	(China) Zhendong Zhang					11	10	6	3	10†	5	-
-	(Macau) Rodolfo Ávila					16	13	10	4			-

Colour	Result
Gold	Winner
Silver	Second place
Bronze	Third place
Green	Points classification
Blue	Non-points classification
Blue	Non-classified finish (NC)
Purple	Retired, not classified (Ret)
Red	Did not qualify (DNQ)
Red	Did not pre-qualify (DNPQ)
Black	Disqualified (DSQ)
White	Did not start (DNS)
White	Withdrew (WD)
White	Race cancelled (C)
Blank	Did not practice (DNP)
Blank	Did not arrive (DNA)
Blank	Excluded (EX)

**Bold** – Pole
Italics – Fastest Lap

==== Team's Standings ====
Pos.	Team	ZHU (China)		SHA (China)		ZHE (China)		NIN (China)		ZHZ (China)		Pts.
Pos.	Team	RD1	RD2	RD1	RD2	RD1	RD2	RD1	RD2	RD1	RD2	Pts.
1	(China) Liqui Moly Team NewFaster	9	5	6	6	3	4	5	2	5	4	248
1	(China) Liqui Moly Team NewFaster	11	9	10	14	8	11	7	6	6	6	248
2	(Macau) Dongfeng Honda MacPro Racing Team	3	7	1	3	10	6	2	Ret	2	1	238
2	(Macau) Dongfeng Honda MacPro Racing Team	6	Ret	3	Ret	13	14	3	Ret	3	3	238
3	(China) Champ x T. A. Motorsport	4	Ret	17	17	15	17	8	7	8	7	88
3	(China) Champ x T. A. Motorsport			18	18			11	DSQ	9	9	88
4	(Germany) Hyundai Team Engstler							1	1	1	2	73
5	(China) Leo Racing Volkswagen Team Oettinger	Ret	8	13	Ret							23
6	(China) Team Artka							9	5			14
Teams ineligible to score points
-	(United Kingdom) Team MG XPower					11	10	6	3	10†	5	-
-	(United Kingdom) Team MG XPower					16	13	10	4			-
