= 2019 TCR Asia Series =

Car racing series

The 2019 TCR Asia Series season was the fifth season of the TCR Asia Series.

Luca Engstler was the defending drivers' champion, while Liqui Moly Team Engstler were the defending teams' champions.

== Race Calendar ==
The provisional 2019 schedule was announced on 18 December 2018, with five events scheduled. The second round was originally scheduled to be held at the Korea International Circuit in support of the TCR Korea Touring Car Series, but following the series' cancellation it was replaced with the Zhuhai International Circuit in support of the TCR China Touring Car Championship

Rnd.		Circuit	Date	Supporting
1	1	(Malaysia) Sepang International Circuit, Kuala Lumpur	6 April	Blancpain GT World Challenge Asia
1	2	(Malaysia) Sepang International Circuit, Kuala Lumpur	7 April	Blancpain GT World Challenge Asia
2	3	(China) Zhuhai International Circuit, Zhuhai	3 May	TCR China Touring Car Championship
2	4	(China) Zhuhai International Circuit, Zhuhai	4 May	TCR China Touring Car Championship
3	5	(China) Shanghai International Circuit, Shanghai	1 June	China Touring Car Championship; TCR China Touring Car Championship
3	6	(China) Shanghai International Circuit, Shanghai	2 June	China Touring Car Championship; TCR China Touring Car Championship
4	7	(China) Zhejiang International Circuit, Shaoxing	5–7 July	China Touring Car Championship; TCR China Touring Car Championship
4	8	(China) Zhejiang International Circuit, Shaoxing	5–7 July	China Touring Car Championship; TCR China Touring Car Championship
5	9	(Thailand) Bangsaen Street Circuit, Chonburi	30 August–1 September	
5	10	(Thailand) Bangsaen Street Circuit, Chonburi	30 August–1 September	

== Teams and drivers ==
Team	Car	No.	Drivers	Class	Rounds
(Germany) Liqui Moly Team Engstler	Hyundai i30 N TCR	1	(Germany) Luca Engstler		All
(Germany) Liqui Moly Team Engstler	Hyundai i30 N TCR	26	(France) Théo Coicaud		1
(Germany) Liqui Moly Team Engstler	Hyundai i30 N TCR	23	(Ecuador) Diego Morán		2–5
(Germany) Volkswagen Team Oettinger	Volkswagen Golf GTI TCR	23	(Ecuador) Diego Morán		1
(Germany) Volkswagen Team Oettinger	Volkswagen Golf GTI TCR	3	(Germany) Roland Hertner	Cup	All
(Germany) Volkswagen Team Oettinger	Volkswagen Golf GTI TCR	4	(Malaysia) Adam Khalid		All
(Hong Kong) Prince Racing	Honda Civic Type R TCR (FK8)	2	(Hong Kong) Kenneth Lau	Cup	1
(Hong Kong) Prince Racing	Honda Civic Type R TCR (FK8)	7	(Hong Kong) Michael Choi		1
(Hong Kong) Teamwork Motorsport	Audi RS 3 LMS TCR	10	(Hong Kong) Cherry Cheung	Cup	2
(Hong Kong) Teamwork Motorsport	Audi RS 3 LMS TCR	11	(Hong Kong) Alex Hui		1−3
(Hong Kong) Teamwork Motorsport	Audi RS 3 LMS TCR	12	(Hong Kong) Sunny Wong		3
(Hong Kong) Teamwork Motorsport	Audi RS 3 LMS TCR	36	(Hong Kong) David Lau	Cup	1, 5
(Philippines) Eurasia Motorsport	Hyundai i30 N TCR	20	(Philippines) Daniel Julián Miranda		All
(Philippines) Eurasia Motorsport	Hyundai i30 N TCR	30	(China) Gao Hua Yang		All
(Thailand) Alphafactory Racing Team by Pulzar	CUPRA León TCR	33	(Thailand) Jakraphan Davee		1, 5
(Malaysia) Viper Niza Racing	CUPRA León TCR	65	(Malaysia) Douglas Khoo	Cup	All
(South Korea) Solite Indigo Racing	Hyundai i30 N TCR	74	(Spain) Pepe Oriola		All
(South Korea) Solite Indigo Racing	Hyundai i30 N TCR	97	(South Korea) Kim Jin Soo		All
(Macau) Elegant Racing Team	CUPRA León TCR	88	(Macau) Kelvin Wong	Cup	3−4
TCR entries ineligible to score TCR Asia points
(United Kingdom) Team MG XPower	MG 6 X-Power TCR	9	(Macau) Rodolfo Ávila		4
(United Kingdom) Team MG XPower	MG 6 X-Power TCR	18	(China) Zhendong Zhang		4
(Macau) Dongfeng Honda MacPro Racing Team	Honda Civic Type R TCR (FK8)	12	(China) Zou Si Rui		4
(Macau) Dongfeng Honda MacPro Racing Team	Honda Civic Type R TCR (FK8)	55	(China) Martin Xie		2–4
(Macau) Dongfeng Honda MacPro Racing Team	Honda Civic Type R TCR (FK8)	77	(United Kingdom) Daniel Lloyd		2–4
(China) Champ x T. A. Motorsport	Audi RS 3 LMS TCR	26	(Macau) Filipe de Souza		2–3
(China) Champ x T. A. Motorsport	Audi RS 3 LMS TCR	48	(Hong Kong) James Wong		3–4
(China) Champ x T. A. Motorsport	Volkswagen Golf GTI TCR	66	(Hong Kong) Michael Wong		3
(China) Liqui Moly Team NewFaster	CUPRA León TCR	33	(Macau) Alex Liu		2–3
(China) Liqui Moly Team NewFaster	Audi RS 3 LMS TCR	81	(China) Huang Chu Han		2–4
(China) Liqui Moly Team NewFaster	Audi RS 3 LMS TCR	86	(Hong Kong) Kenneth Look		2–4
(China) Leo Racing Volkswagen Team Oettinger	Volkswagen Golf GTI TCR	99	(China) Li Lin		2–3

== Results and standings ==
Rnd.		Circuit	Date	Pole position	Fastest lap	Winning driver	Winning team	Cup winner
1	1	(Malaysia) Sepang International Circuit	6 April	(Germany) Luca Engstler	(Germany) Luca Engstler	(Germany) Luca Engstler	(Germany) Liqui Moly Team Engstler	(Malaysia) Douglas Khoo
1	2	(Malaysia) Sepang International Circuit	7 April		(Ecuador) Diego Morán	(Ecuador) Diego Morán	(Germany) Volkswagen Team Oettinger	(Malaysia) Douglas Khoo
2	3	(China) Zhuhai International Circuit	3 May	(Germany) Luca Engstler	(Germany) Luca Engstler	(Germany) Luca Engstler	(Germany) Liqui Moly Team Engstler	(Germany) Roland Hertner
2	4	(China) Zhuhai International Circuit	4 May		(Hong Kong) Alex Hui	(Germany) Luca Engstler	(Germany) Liqui Moly Team Engstler	No finishers
3	5	(China) Shanghai International Circuit	1 June	(Ecuador) Diego Morán	(Germany) Luca Engstler	(Germany) Luca Engstler	(Germany) Liqui Moly Team Engstler	(Macau) Kelvin Wong
3	6	(China) Shanghai International Circuit	2 June		(Germany) Luca Engstler	(Germany) Luca Engstler	(Germany) Liqui Moly Team Engstler	(Macau) Kelvin Wong
4	7	(China) Zhejiang International Circuit	5–7 July	(Germany) Luca Engstler	(Germany) Luca Engstler	(Germany) Luca Engstler	(Germany) Liqui Moly Team Engstler	(Macau) Kelvin Wong
4	8	(China) Zhejiang International Circuit	5–7 July		(Germany) Luca Engstler	(Ecuador) Diego Morán	(Germany) Liqui Moly Team Engstler	(Macau) Kelvin Wong
5	9	(Thailand) Bangsaen Street Circuit	30 August–1 September	(Germany) Luca Engstler	(Germany) Luca Engstler	(Ecuador) Diego Morán	(Germany) Liqui Moly Team Engstler	(Germany) Roland Hertner
5	10	(Thailand) Bangsaen Street Circuit	30 August–1 September		(Germany) Luca Engstler	(Ecuador) Diego Morán	(Germany) Liqui Moly Team Engstler	(Malaysia) Douglas Khoo

=== Drivers' championship ===
Pos.	Driver	SEP (Malaysia)		ZHU (China)		SHA (China)		ZHE (China)		BNG (Thailand)		Pts.
Pos.	Driver	RD1	RD2	RD1	RD2	RD1	RD2	RD1	RD2	RD1	RD2	Pts.
1	(Germany) Luca Engstler	**1**^{1}	Ret	**1**^{1}	1	**2**^{3}	1	**1**^{1}	3	**2**	3	221
2	(Ecuador) Diego Morán	3^{4}	1	7^{2}	2	5^{1}	4	4^{4}	1	1	1	206
3	(Spain) Pepe Oriola	4^{3}	3	2^{4}	Ret	4	2	2^{2}	2	6	2	156
4	(Philippines) Daniel Julián Miranda	6	2	Ret^{3}	3	9	5	6	DSQ	Ret	6	84
5	(China) Gao Hua Yang	10	10	10	6	11	11	9	7	3	4	71
6	(South Korea) Kim Jin Soo	8	8	12	10	7	10	7^{3}	8	Ret	DNS	57
7	(Malaysia) Adam Khalid	7	6	Ret^{5}	Ret	15	9	5^{5}	5	Ret	DNS	47
8	(Hong Kong) Alex Hui	DNS	Ret	5	4	Ret^{4}	7					39
9	(Germany) Roland Hertner	12	9	8	Ret	12	13	13	12	4	Ret	38
10	(Malaysia) Douglas Khoo	9	7	Ret	Ret	14	16	17†	15	5	5	36
11	(France) Théo Coicaud	2^{2}	4									34
12	(Macau) Kelvin Wong					8^{5}	8	EX	EX			29
13	(Thailand) Jakraphan Davee	5^{5}	5							Ret	DNS	21
14	(Hong Kong) David Lau	Ret	12							7	Ret	6
15	(Hong Kong) Sunny Wong					Ret^{2}	12					5
16	(Hong Kong) Cherry Cheung			13	Ret							4
17	(Hong Kong) Michael Choi	11	11									0
-	(Hong Kong) Kenneth Lau	Ret	DNS									0
Drivers ineligible to score points
-	(United Kingdom) Daniel Lloyd			3	7	1	3	DSQ	6			-
-	(China) Martin Xie			6	Ret	2	Ret	10	16			-
-	(China) Terry Huang			9	5	6	6	3	4			-
-	(Macau) Filipe de Souza			4	Ret	Ret	Ret					-
-	(Hong Kong) Kenneth Look			11	11	10	14	8	11			-
-	(China) Li Lin			Ret	8	13	Ret					-
-	(Macau) Alex Liu			14	9	16	Ret					-
-	(China) Zhendong Zhang							11	10			-
-	(China) Zou Si Rui							13	14			-
-	(Macau) Rodolfo Ávila							16	13			-
-	(Hong Kong) James Wong					17	17	15	17			-
-	(Hong Kong) Michael Wong					18	18					-
Pos.	Driver	SEP (Malaysia)		ZHU (China)		SHA (China)		ZHE (China)		BNG (Thailand)		Pts.

Colour	Result
Gold	Winner
Silver	Second place
Bronze	Third place
Green	Points classification
Blue	Non-points classification
Blue	Non-classified finish (NC)
Purple	Retired, not classified (Ret)
Red	Did not qualify (DNQ)
Red	Did not pre-qualify (DNPQ)
Black	Disqualified (DSQ)
White	Did not start (DNS)
White	Withdrew (WD)
White	Race cancelled (C)
Blank	Did not practice (DNP)
Blank	Did not arrive (DNA)
Blank	Excluded (EX)

**Bold** – Pole
Italics – Fastest Lap

=== Teams' championship ===
Pos.	Driver	SEP (Malaysia)		ZHU (China)		SHA (China)		ZHE (China)		BNG (Thailand)		Pts.
Pos.	Driver	RD1	RD2	RD1	RD2	RD1	RD2	RD1	RD2	RD1	RD2	Pts.
1	(Germany) Liqui Moly Team Engstler	**1**^{1}	4	**1**^{1}	1	**2**^{3}	1	**1**^{1}	1	**1**^{1}	1	419
1	(Germany) Liqui Moly Team Engstler	2^{2}	Ret	7^{2}	2	5^{1}	4	4^{4}	3	2^{3}	3	419
2	(South Korea) Solite Indigo Racing	4^{3}	3	2^{4}	10	4	2	2^{2}	2	6^{2}	2	214
2	(South Korea) Solite Indigo Racing	8	8	12	Ret	7	10	7^{3}	8	Ret^{5}	DNS	214
3	(Philippines) Eurasia Motorsport	6	2	10	3	9	5	6	DSQ	3^{4}	4	156
3	(Philippines) Eurasia Motorsport	10	10	Ret^{3}	6	11	11	7	8	Ret	6	156
4	(Germany) Volkswagen Team Oettinger	3^{4}	1	8	Ret	12	9	5^{5}	5	4	Ret	125
4	(Germany) Volkswagen Team Oettinger	7	6	Ret^{5}	Ret	15	13	13	12	Ret	DNS	125
5	(Hong Kong) Teamwork Motorsport	DNS	12	5	4	Ret^{2}	7			7	Ret	54
5	(Hong Kong) Teamwork Motorsport	Ret	Ret	13	Ret	Ret^{4}	12					54
6	(Malaysia) Viper Niza Racing	9	7	Ret	Ret	14	16	Ret	15	5	5	36
7	(Thailand) Alphafactory Racing Team by Pulzar	5^{5}	5							Ret	DNS	21
8	(Macau) Elegant Racing Team					8^{5}	8	EX	EX			19
9	(Hong Kong) Prince Racing	11	11									1
9	(Hong Kong) Prince Racing	Ret	DNS									1
Teams ineligible to score points
-	(Macau) Dongfeng Honda MacPro Racing Team			3	7	1	3	10	6			-
-	(Macau) Dongfeng Honda MacPro Racing Team			6	Ret	2	Ret	13	14			-
-	(China) Liqui Moly Team NewFaster			9	5	6	6	3	4			-
-	(China) Liqui Moly Team NewFaster			11	9	10	14	8	11			-
-	(China) T. A. Motorsport			4	Ret	17	17	15	17			-
-	(China) T. A. Motorsport					Ret	Ret					-
-	(China) Leo Racing Volkswagen Team Oettinger			Ret	8	13	Ret					-
-	(United Kingdom) Team MG XPower							11	10			-
-	(United Kingdom) Team MG XPower							16	13			-
Pos.	Driver	SEP (Malaysia)		ZHU (China)		SHA (China)		ZHE (China)		BNG (Thailand)		Pts.

Colour	Result
Gold	Winner
Silver	Second place
Bronze	Third place
Green	Points classification
Blue	Non-points classification
Blue	Non-classified finish (NC)
Purple	Retired, not classified (Ret)
Red	Did not qualify (DNQ)
Red	Did not pre-qualify (DNPQ)
Black	Disqualified (DSQ)
White	Did not start (DNS)
White	Withdrew (WD)
White	Race cancelled (C)
Blank	Did not practice (DNP)
Blank	Did not arrive (DNA)
Blank	Excluded (EX)

**Bold** – Pole
Italics – Fastest Lap

=== TCR Asia Cup ===
Pos	Driver	SEP (Malaysia)		ZHU (China)		SHA (China)		ZHE (China)		BNG (Thailand)		Points
Pos	Driver	RD1	RD2	RD1	RD2	RD1	RD2	RD1	RD2	RD1	RD2	Points
1	(Germany) Roland Hertner	12	9	8	Ret	12	13	13	12	4	Ret	158
2	(Malaysia) Douglas Khoo	9	7	Ret	Ret	14	16	Ret	15	5	5	138
3	(Macau) Kelvin Wong					8	8	12	9			100
4	(Hong Kong) David Lau	Ret	12							7	Ret	30
5	(Hong Kong) Cherry Cheung			13	Ret							18
-	(Hong Kong) Kenneth Lau	Ret	DNS									0
Pos.	Driver	SEP (Malaysia)		ZHU (China)		SHA (China)		ZHE (China)		BNG (Thailand)		Pts.
