= 2018 TCR Middle East Series =

The 2018 TCR Middle East Series season was the second season of the TCR Middle East Series. The championship started at Yas Marina Circuit in Abu Dhabi on 19 January and ended at the Bahrain International Circuit in Sakhir on 24 February. Josh Files and Liqui Moly Team Engstler were the defending drivers' and teams' championships respectively.

== Teams and drivers ==
Team	Car	No.	Drivers	Rounds
(Italy) Pit Lane Competizioni (Note: The drivers of the team are divided into two groups. Giacomo Altoè, Giovanni Altoè, Alberto Vescovi and Danny Kroes, driving the Audi RS 3 LMS TCR, are on the team of Pit Lane Competizioni 1, while Jordi Oriola, Lorenzo Veglia and Mat'o Homola, driving the Volkswagen Golf GTI TCR are on the team of Pit Lane Competizioni 2.)	Volkswagen Golf GTI TCR	7	(Bahrain) Nasser Al Alawi	3
(Italy) Pit Lane Competizioni	Volkswagen Golf GTI TCR	21	(Spain) Jordi Oriola	1–2
(Italy) Pit Lane Competizioni	Volkswagen Golf GTI TCR	44	(Italy) Lorenzo Veglia	All
(Italy) Pit Lane Competizioni	Volkswagen Golf GTI TCR	55	(Bahrain) Raed Himmo	3
(Italy) Pit Lane Competizioni	Volkswagen Golf GTI TCR	70	(Slovakia) Maťo Homola	1–2
(Italy) Pit Lane Competizioni	Audi RS 3 LMS TCR	10	(Italy) Giacomo Altoè	All
(Italy) Pit Lane Competizioni	Audi RS 3 LMS TCR	21	(Spain) Jordi Oriola	3
(Italy) Pit Lane Competizioni	Audi RS 3 LMS TCR	23	(Italy) Giovanni Altoè	1–2
(Italy) Pit Lane Competizioni	Audi RS 3 LMS TCR	24	(Netherlands) Danny Kroes	2
(Italy) Pit Lane Competizioni	Audi RS 3 LMS TCR	32	(Italy) Alberto Vescovi	1
(Germany) Liqui Moly Team Engstler	Volkswagen Golf GTI TCR	8	(Germany) Luca Engstler	All
(Germany) Liqui Moly Team Engstler	Volkswagen Golf GTI TCR	39	(Switzerland) Florian Thoma	All
(Germany) H&R Spezialfedern	Volkswagen Golf GTI TCR	13	(Germany) Kai Jordan	All
(United Arab Emirates) Mouhritsa Racing Team	SEAT León TCR	9	(Greece) Costas Papantonis	1–2
(Slovakia) Brutal Fish Racing Team	Volkswagen Golf GTI TCR	17	(Slovakia) Martin Ryba	All

== Calendar and results ==
The 2018 schedule was announced on 10 November 2017, with four events held across the Middle East. On 21 December 2017, was announced that will now be contested over three racing weekends instead of the four included in the previously released schedule.

Rnd.		Circuit	Date	Pole position	Fastest lap	Winning driver	Winning team	Supporting
1	1	(United Arab Emirates) Yas Marina Circuit, Abu Dhabi (North Circuit)	20 January	(Italy) Giacomo Altoè	(Slovakia) Maťo Homola	(Italy) Giacomo Altoè	(Italy) Pit Lane Competizioni	Formula 4 UAE Championship
1	2	(United Arab Emirates) Yas Marina Circuit, Abu Dhabi (North Circuit)	20 January		(Germany) Luca Engstler	(Germany) Luca Engstler	(Germany) Liqui Moly Team Engstler	Formula 4 UAE Championship
2	3	(United Arab Emirates) Dubai Autodrome, Dubai (International Circuit)	27 January	(Germany) Luca Engstler	(Germany) Luca Engstler	(Germany) Luca Engstler	(Germany) Liqui Moly Team Engstler	Formula 4 UAE Championship
2	4	(United Arab Emirates) Dubai Autodrome, Dubai (International Circuit)	27 January		(Switzerland) Florian Thoma	(Switzerland) Florian Thoma	(Germany) Liqui Moly Team Engstler	Formula 4 UAE Championship
3	5	Bahrain International Circuit, Sakhir (Oasis Circuit)	23-24 February	(Germany) Luca Engstler	(Germany) Luca Engstler	(Germany) Luca Engstler	(Germany) Liqui Moly Team Engstler	
3	6	Bahrain International Circuit, Sakhir (Oasis Circuit)	23-24 February	Race cancelled due to heavy rain.				

== Championship standings ==
=== Drivers' championship ===
Pos.	Driver	YMC (United Arab Emirates)		DUB (United Arab Emirates)		BHR (Bahrain)		Points
1	(Germany) Luca Engstler	3^{2}	1	1^{1}	3	1^{1}	C	119
2	(Italy) Giacomo Altoè	1^{1}	3	2^{2}	6	3^{4}	C	92
3	(Switzerland) Florian Thoma	4^{4}	11†	5	1	2^{3}	C	70
4	(Slovakia) Maťo Homola	2^{3}	4	4^{5}	2			64
5	(Germany) Kai Jordan	6^{5}	2	6^{3}	5	6^{2}	C	60
6	(Italy) Lorenzo Veglia	5	8	3	10	5^{5}	C	41
8	(Spain) Jordi Oriola	7	5	8	7	4	C	38
8	(Italy) Giovanni Altoè	8	6	7	4			30
9	(Slovakia) Martin Ryba	Ret	9	10	9	8	C	9
10	(Italy) Alberto Vescovi	10	7					7
11	(Bahrain) Nasser Al Alawi					7	C	6
12	(Netherlands) Danny Kroes			Ret^{4}	8			6
13	(Greece) Costas Papantonis	9	10	9	Ret			5
-	(Bahrain) Raed Himmo					Ret	C	0

=== Teams' Championship ===
Pos.	Driver	YMC (United Arab Emirates)		DUB (United Arab Emirates)		BHR (Bahrain)		Points
1	(Germany) Liqui Moly Team Engstler	3^{2}	1	1^{1}	1	1^{1}	C	191
1	(Germany) Liqui Moly Team Engstler	4^{4}	11†	5	3	2^{3}	C	191
2	(Italy) Pit Lane Competizioni 1	1^{1}	3	2^{2}	4	3^{4}	C	138
2	(Italy) Pit Lane Competizioni 1	8	6	7^{4}	6	4	C	138
3	(Italy) Pit Lane Competizioni 2	2^{3}	4	3	2	5^{5}	C	122
3	(Italy) Pit Lane Competizioni 2	5	5	4^{5}	7	7	C	122
4	(Germany) H&R Spezialfedern	6^{5}	2	6^{3}	5	6^{2}	C	60
5	(Slovakia) Brutal Fish Racing Team	Ret	9	10	9	8	C	16
6	(United Arab Emirates) Mouhritsa Racing Team	9	10	9	Ret			12
