= 2020 ADAC TCR Germany Touring Car Championship =

Motorsport season

The 2020 ADAC TCR Germany Touring Car Championship was the fifth season of touring car racing to be run by the German-based sanctioning body ADAC to the TCR regulations. The series ran predominantly in ADAC's home nation Germany. As a support category to the ADAC GT Masters series, the championship also had races in the neighbouring nations of Austria and the Netherlands.

Max Hesse was the defending Drivers' champion, while Hyundai Team Engstler were the defending Teams' champions. This season Antti Buri became Drivers' champion and HP Racing International won Teams' champion.

== Teams and drivers ==
Yokohama is the official tire supplier.

Team	Car	No.	Drivers	Class	Rounds	Ref.
(Austria) HP Racing International	Hyundai i30 N TCR	2	(Austria) Harald Proczyk		All	
(Austria) HP Racing International	Hyundai i30 N TCR	98	(Germany) Jan Seyffert		All	
(Germany) Hyundai Team Engstler	Hyundai i30 N TCR	13	(Finland) Antti Buri		All	
(Germany) Hyundai Team Engstler	Hyundai i30 N TCR	29	(Malaysia) Mitchell Cheah		5	
(Germany) Hyundai Team Engstler	Hyundai i30 N TCR	97	(Austria) Nicolas Gruber	J	1–4, 6–7	
(Germany) Profi-Car Team Honda ADAC Sachsen	Honda Civic Type R TCR (FK8)	7	(Germany) Mike Halder		1–2	
(Germany) Profi-Car Team Honda ADAC Sachsen	Honda Civic Type R TCR (FK8)	55	(Germany) Marcel Fugel	J	3–7	
(Germany) Profi-Car Team Honda ADAC Sachsen	Honda Civic Type R TCR (FK8)	88	(Germany) Dominik Fugel		All	
(Germany) Volkswagen Team Oettinger	Volkswagen Golf GTI TCR	8	(Germany) René Kircher	J	All	
(Poland) Legutko Racing – ADAC Berlin	Honda Civic Type R TCR (FK2)	17	(Poland) Albert Legutko	J	1, 3–7	
(Finland) Positione Motorsport	Volkswagen Golf GTI TCR	51	(Finland) Harri Salminen		1–4	
(Germany) Profi-Car Team Halder	Honda Civic Type R TCR (FK8)	53	(Germany) Michelle Halder		1–2	
(Germany) Profi-Car Team Halder	Honda Civic Type R TCR (FK8)	55	(Germany) Marcel Fugel	J	1–2	
(Lithuania) Skuba Racing Team	Volkswagen Golf GTI TCR	92	(Lithuania) Dziugas Tovilavicius		All	
Entries ineligible to score points
(Germany) Lubner Motorsport	Opel Astra TCR	6	(Germany) Steffen Redlich		3	
(Germany) Lubner Motorsport	Opel Astra TCR	84	(Germany) Philipp Welsdorf		3	
(Italy) Target Competition	Hyundai i30 N TCR	19	(Sweden) Andreas Bäckman		2	
(Italy) Target Competition	Hyundai i30 N TCR	26	(Sweden) Jessica Bäckman		2	
(Germany) Profi-Car Team Honda ADAC Sachsen	Honda Civic Type R TCR (FK8)	18	(Portugal) Tiago Monteiro		7	
(Czech Republic) GT2 Motorsport	Volkswagen Golf GTI TCR	21	(Poland) Szymon Ładniak	J	2–3, 5	
(Austria) MAIR Racing Osttirol	Audi RS 3 LMS TCR	23	(Austria) Sandro Soubek		5	
(Austria) Wimmer Werk Motorsport	CUPRA Leon Competición TCR	24	(Austria) Felix Wimmer		3, 5	
(Austria) Wimmer Werk Motorsport	CUPRA Leon Competición TCR	56	(Austria) Günter Benninger		3, 5	
(Austria) Wimmer Werk Motorsport	CUPRA Leon Competición TCR	99	(Austria) Christian Voithofer		5	
(Germany) Hyundai Team Engstler	Hyundai i30 N TCR	100	(Germany) Guido Naumann		1	
(Germany) Hyundai Team Engstler	Hyundai i30 N TCR	101	(Germany) Niki Schelle		3	
(Germany) Hyundai Team Engstler	Hyundai i30 N TCR	102	(Germany) Patrick Simon		5	
(Germany) Hyundai Team Engstler	Hyundai i30 N TCR	103	(Austria) Laura Kraihamer		6	
(Germany) Hyundai Team Engstler	Hyundai i30 N TCR	105	(Hungary) Norbert Michelisz		2	
(Germany) Hyundai Team Engstler	Hyundai i30 N TCR	108	(Germany) Luca Engstler		7	
(Germany) Hyundai Team Engstler	Hyundai i30 N TCR	123	(Germany) Marcel Schrötter		4	

== Calendar and results ==
The initial calendar was released on 29 September 2019 with 7 rounds scheduled across Germany, Austria, the Netherlands and Czech Republic. Due to the COVID-19 pandemic on 16 March 2020 the pre-season test and the opening round, both scheduled to be held at the Motorsport Arena Oschersleben, were cancelled. The first revision of the calendar saw Autodrom Most in August as the season opener. On 24 May 2020 the final version of the calendar was published with the round at the Autodrom Most replaced by a round at the Lausitzring.

Rnd.		Circuit	Date	Pole position	Fastest lap	Winning driver	Winning team	Junior winner
1	1	(Germany) Lausitzring, Klettwitz	2 August	(Finland) Antti Buri	(Austria) Nicolas Gruber	(Austria) Nicolas Gruber	(Germany) Hyundai Team Engstler	(Austria) Nicolas Gruber
1	2	(Germany) Lausitzring, Klettwitz	2 August		(Finland) Antti Buri	(Germany) Dominik Fugel	(Germany) Profi-Car Team Honda ADAC Sachsen	(Austria) Nicolas Gruber
2	3	(Germany) Nürburgring, Nürburg	15 August	(Austria) Harald Proczyk (Note: Actual pole position taken by guest driver Norbert Michelisz from Hyundai Team Engstler.)	(Germany) Mike Halder (Note: Actual fastest lap of the race set by guest driver Norbert Michelisz from Hyundai Team Engstler.)	(Germany) Michelle Halder (Note: Actual race winner was guest driver Norbert Michelisz from Hyundai Team Engstler.)	(Germany) Profi-Car Team Halder	(Germany) René Kircher
2	4	(Germany) Nürburgring, Nürburg	16 August		(Austria) Harald Proczyk	(Austria) Harald Proczyk	(Austria) HP Racing International	(Germany) Marcel Fugel
3	5	(Germany) Hockenheimring, Hockenheim	19 September	(Austria) Nicolas Gruber	(Germany) Jan Seyffert	(Germany) Jan Seyffert	(Austria) HP Racing International	(Germany) René Kircher (Note: Actual junior winner was guest driver Szymon Ładniak from GT2 Motorsport.)
3	6	(Germany) Hockenheimring, Hockenheim	20 September		(Germany) Dominik Fugel	(Finland) Antti Buri	(Germany) Hyundai Team Engstler	(Germany) Marcel Fugel
4	7	(Germany) Sachsenring, Hohenstein-Ernstthal	3 October	(Germany) Jan Seyffert	(Germany) Dominik Fugel	(Germany) Dominik Fugel	(Germany) Profi-Car Team Honda ADAC Sachsen	(Germany) Marcel Fugel
4	8	(Germany) Sachsenring, Hohenstein-Ernstthal	4 October		(Germany) Dominik Fugel	(Austria) Harald Proczyk	(Austria) HP Racing International	(Germany) Marcel Fugel
5	9	(Austria) Red Bull Ring, Spielberg	17 October	(Malaysia) Mitchell Cheah	(Austria) Harald Proczyk	(Austria) Harald Proczyk	(Austria) HP Racing International	(Germany) Marcel Fugel
5	10	(Austria) Red Bull Ring, Spielberg	18 October		(Finland) Antti Buri (Note: Actual fastest lap was set by guest driver Sandro Soubek from MAIR Racing Osttirol)	(Finland) Antti Buri	(Germany) Hyundai Team Engstler	(Poland) Albert Legutko
6	11	(Germany) Lausitzring, Klettwitz	31 October	(Austria) Harald Proczyk	(Finland) Antti Buri	(Finland) Antti Buri	(Germany) Hyundai Team Engstler	(Poland) Albert Legutko
6	12	(Germany) Lausitzring, Klettwitz	1 November		(Germany) Dominik Fugel	(Germany) Dominik Fugel	(Germany) Profi-Car Team Honda ADAC Sachsen	(Poland) Albert Legutko
7	13	(Germany) Motorsport Arena Oschersleben, Oschersleben	7 November	(Finland) Antti Buri	(Finland) Antti Buri	(Finland) Antti Buri	(Germany) Hyundai Team Engstler	(Germany) Marcel Fugel
7	14	(Germany) Motorsport Arena Oschersleben, Oschersleben	8 November		(Germany) Dominik Fugel	(Germany) Dominik Fugel	(Germany) Profi-Car Team Honda ADAC Sachsen	(Austria) Nicolas Gruber

=== Drivers' Championship ===
Scoring systems

Position	1st	2nd	3rd	4th	5th	6th	7th	8th	9th	10th	11th	12th	13th	14th	15th	PP
Points	25	20	16	13	11	10	9	8	7	6	5	4	3	2	1	**3**

Pos.	Driver	LAU (Germany)		NÜR (Germany)		HOC (Germany)		SAC (Germany)		RBR (Austria)		ZAN (Netherlands)		OSC (Germany)		Pts.
1	(Finland) Antti Buri	**3**^{1}	3	12	7	11	1	3	4	5	1	1	2	1	3	249
2	(Austria) Harald Proczyk	4	2	**8**^{1}	1	2	Ret	4	1	1	2	2	3	6	2	246
3	(Germany) Dominik Fugel	6	1	4	3	Ret	2	1	2	14†	3	9	1	3	1	243
4	(Germany) Jan Seyffert	5^{2}	6	5	4	1	Ret	5	5	4	8	7	5	7	Ret	165
5	(Germany) Marcel Fugel	10	9	7	5	14	3	2	3	6	7	Ret	Ret	5	Ret	140
6	(Germany) René Kircher	7	7	6	8	7	4	7	9	8	Ret	5	7	9	5	134
7	(Lithuania) Dziugas Tovilavicius	12	11	11	9	3	7	10	8	9	10	8	9	4	Ret	119
8	(Austria) Nicolas Gruber	1^{3}	4	Ret	Ret	13	Ret	6	7			4	6	8	4	117
9	(Poland) Albert Legutko	Ret	10			DSQ	5	8	Ret	7	6	3	4	10	6	94
10	(Finland) Harri Salminen	9	8	9	12	9	Ret	Ret	Ret							50
11	(Germany) Michelle Halder	11	5	3^{3}	WD											43
12	(Malaysia) Mitchel Cheah									2	Ret					23
13	(Germany) Mike Halder	2	Ret	DSQ^{2}	WD											22
Drivers ineligible to score points
	(Hungary) Norbert Michelisz			**1**	2											
	(Sweden) Andreas Bäckman			2	10											
	(Portugal) Tiago Monteiro													2	Ret	
	(Germany) Patrick Simon									3	5					
	(Germany) Philipp Walsdorf					4	6									
	(Austria) Sandro Soubek									Ret	4					
	(Poland) Szymon Ładniak			10	11	5	8			10	9					
	(Austria) Laura Kraihamer											6	8			
	(Germany) Marcel Schrötter							9	6							
	(Austria) Felix Wimmer					6	Ret			11	11					
	(Sweden) Jessica Bäckman			Ret	6											
	(Germany) Steffen Redlich					8	9									
	(Germany) Guido Naumann	8	Ret													
	(Austria) Günter Benninger					12	10			13†	12					
	(Germany) Niki Schelle					10	Ret									
	(Austria) Christian Voithofer									12	13					
	(Germany) Luca Engstler													Ret	Ret	
Pos.	Driver	LAU (Germany)		NÜR (Germany)		HOC (Germany)		SAC (Germany)		RBR (Austria)		ZAN (Netherlands)		OSC (Germany)		Pts.

Colour	Result
Gold	Winner
Silver	Second place
Bronze	Third place
Green	Points classification
Blue	Non-points classification
Blue	Non-classified finish (NC)
Purple	Retired, not classified (Ret)
Red	Did not qualify (DNQ)
Red	Did not pre-qualify (DNPQ)
Black	Disqualified (DSQ)
White	Did not start (DNS)
White	Withdrew (WD)
White	Race cancelled (C)
Blank	Did not practice (DNP)
Blank	Did not arrive (DNA)
Blank	Excluded (EX)

**Bold** – Pole
Italics – Fastest Lap

=== Teams' Championship ===
Pos.	Team	LAU (Germany)		NÜR (Germany)		HOC (Germany)		SAC (Germany)		RBR (Austria)		ZAN (Netherlands)		OSC (Germany)		Pts.
1	(Austria) HP Racing International	4	2	5	1	1	Ret	4	1	1	2	2	3	6	2	398
1	(Austria) HP Racing International	5^{2}	6	**8**^{3}	4	2	Ret	5	5	4	8	7	5	7	Ret	398
2	(Germany) Hyundai Team Engstler	1^{3}	3	12	7	11	1	3	4	2	1	1	2	1	3	374
2	(Germany) Hyundai Team Engstler	**3**^{1}	4	Ret	Ret	13	Ret	6	7	5	Ret	4	6	8	4	374
3	(Germany) Profi-Car Team ADAC Sachsen	6	1	4	3	14	2	1	2	6	3	9	1	3	1	363
3	(Germany) Profi-Car Team ADAC Sachsen	10	9	DSQ	WD	Ret	3	2	3	14†	7	Ret	Ret	5	Ret	363
4	(Germany) Volkswagen Team Oettinger	7	7	6	8	7	4	7	9	8	Ret	5	7	9	5	132
5	(Lithuania) Skuba Racing Team	12	11	11	9	3	7	10	8	9	10	8	9	4	Ret	119
6	(Poland) Legutko Racing – ADAC Berlin	Ret	10			DSQ	5	8	Ret	7	6	3	4	10	6	94
7	(Germany) Profi Car Team Halder	2	5	3	5											80
7	(Germany) Profi Car Team Halder	11	Ret	7	WD											80
8	(Finland) Positione Motorsport	9	8	9	12	9	Ret	Ret	Ret							50
Teams ineligible to score points
–	(Germany) Hyundai Team Engstler	8	Ret	**1**	2	10	Ret	9	6	3	5	6	8	Ret	Ret	–
–	(Italy) Target Competition			2	6											–
–	(Italy) Target Competition			Ret	10											–
–	(Germany) Profi-Car Team Honda ADAC Sachsen													2	Ret	–
–	(Germany) Lubner Motorsport					4	6									–
–	(Germany) Lubner Motorsport					8	9									–
–	(Germany) MAIR Racing Osttirol									Ret	4					–
–	(Czech Republic) GT2 Motorsport			10	11	5	8			10	9					–
–	(Austria) Wimmer Werk Motorsport					6	10			11	11					–
–	(Austria) Wimmer Werk Motorsport					12	Ret			12	12					–
Pos.	Team	LAU (Germany)		NÜR (Germany)		HOC (Germany)		SAC (Germany)		RBR (Austria)		ZAN (Netherlands)		OSC (Germany)		Pts.
