= Luca Engstler =

German racing driver

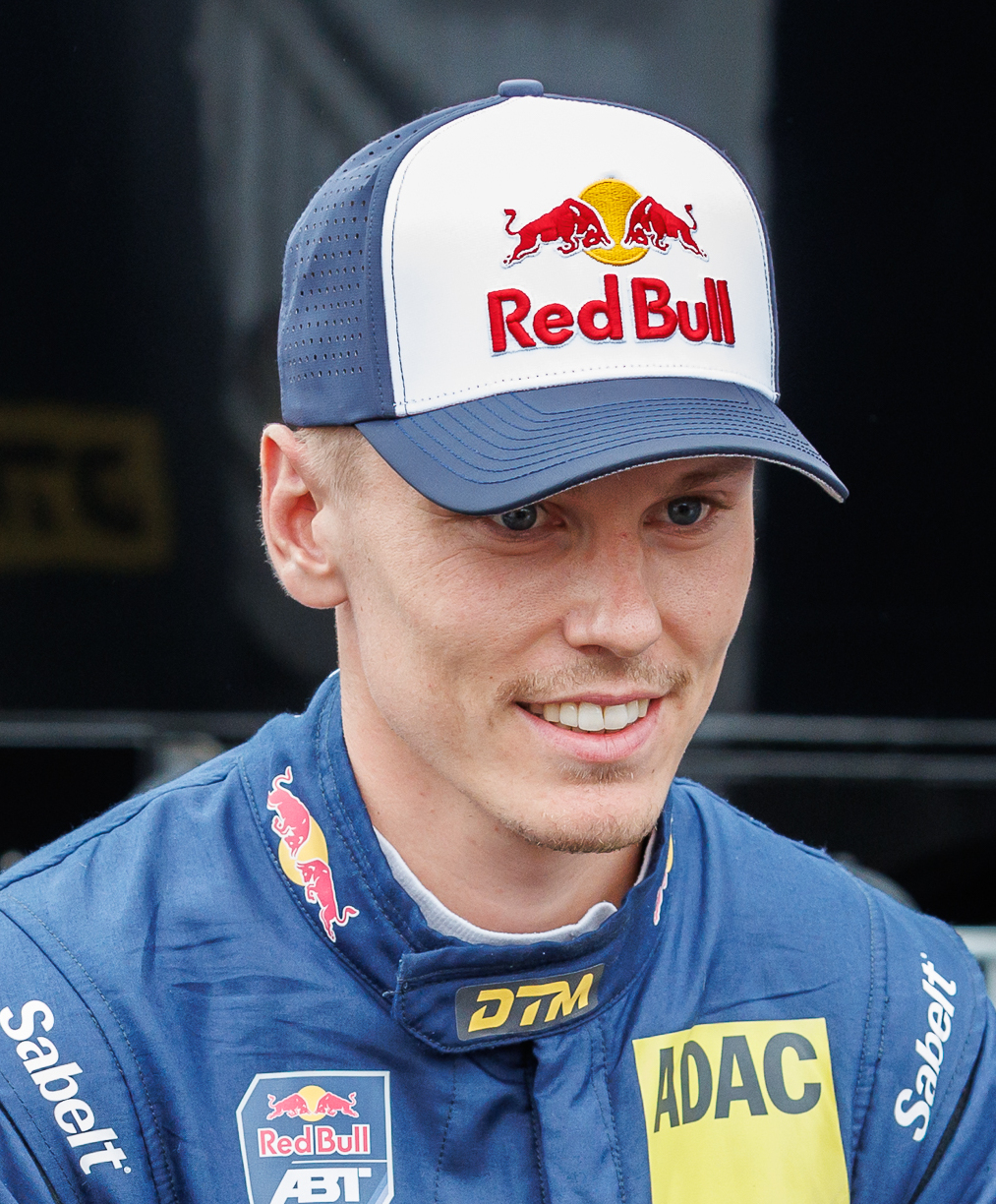
- Engstler in 2026
- Nationality: (Germany) German
- Born: Luca Franz Engstler; 8 March 2000 (age 26) Wiggensbach, Germany
- Relatives: Franz Engstler (father)

Deutsche Tourenwagen Masters career
- Debut season: 2023
- Current team: Red Bull Team Abt
- Categorisation: FIA Silver (until 2019); FIA Gold (2020–)
- Car number: 130
- Former teams: Liqui Moly Team Engstler; GRT Grasser Racing Team
- Starts: 63 (63 entries)
- Wins: 2
- Podiums: 1
- Poles: 1
- Fastest laps: 1
- Best finish: 12th in 2025, 2026

Previous series
- 2022 2019–21 2019 2017–18, 20–21 2015–16: ADAC GT Masters; World Touring Car Cup; TCR Europe; ADAC TCR Germany ADAC Formula 4

Championship titles
- 2024 2021 2021 2019-2020 2018-2019 2018 2017: GT World Challenge Europe Sprint Cup - Gold Cup; World Touring Car Cup - Junior; ADAC TCR Germany Touring Car Championship; TCR Malaysia Touring Car Championship; TCR Asia Series; TCR Middle East Series; ADAC TCR Germany Touring Car Championship - Junior

Luca Franz Engstler (born 8 March 2000) is a German racing driver currently competing in the DTM. Like his father Franz Engstler he made his name in the touring car scene, winning the TCR Asia Series in 2018 and 2019 and taking the 2021 TCR title in Germany.

Engstler is a DTM race winner, having triumphed at Oschersleben in April 2024.

== Early career & TCR ==
Engstler began his career in 2009 in karting, where he remained until 2014. In 2015, he switched to the ADAC Formula 4 series, spending two years in the championship and scoring a total of two points. For 2017, he switched to the ADAC TCR Germany Touring Car Championship; he took his first podiums at the third round of the championship at Oschersleben, where he finished third twice.

In June 2017, it was announced that Engstler would race in the TCR International Series, driving a Volkswagen Golf GTI TCR for his ADAC TCR Germany team Junior Team Engstler.

Since 2017, Engstler has competed in a range of TCR Series including ADAC Germany, Middle East, Asia, Europe, China, Malaysia and the World series. He was the 2019 Middle East champion, 2018 and 2019 TCR Asia champion and 2019 and 2020 TCR Malaysia champion.

The 2019 season saw Engstler compete in the TCR Europe Touring Car Series with the M1RA outfit. He finished the season in ninth place, having taken two podiums, including a controversial win at the Red Bull Ring where he collided with Luca Filippi on the final lap. The German also competed in the World Touring Car Cup as a wildcard entry at the Slovakia Ring, as well as replacing Augusto Farfus in Macau.

In 2020, Engstler entered the World Touring Car Cup on a full-time basis, driving a Hyundai i30 N TCR for the family team. With a best finish of eighth, the German ended up 16th in the championship. Engstler returned to the series in 2021, this time being joined at Engstler Motorsport by experienced race winner Jean-Karl Vernay. Despite only finishing 15th overall, Engstler managed to score his maiden WTCR podium at the Nordschleife, as well as winning the rookie championship by one point to Gilles Magnus. During the same year, Engstler also managed to clinch the ADAC TCR Germany Touring Car Championship, winning the title with two races to spare.

== GT3 career ==
In 2022, Engstler switched to GT racing in the GT3 category, driving for Rutronik Racing in the ADAC GT Masters alongside Patric Niederhauser. The pair started out with a second place at Oschersleben and went on to become regular top-ten finishers, leaving them 14th in the standings by the end of the season.

Engstler progressed to the DTM in 2023, driving an Audi R8 LMS Evo II fielded by the family team. He struggled to score points consistently, ending up with a best race result of seventh and finishing 24th overall.

The same year saw Engstler compete at the 24 Hours of Spa, where he finished third overall with Scherer Sport PHX alongside Kelvin van der Linde and Nicki Thiim.

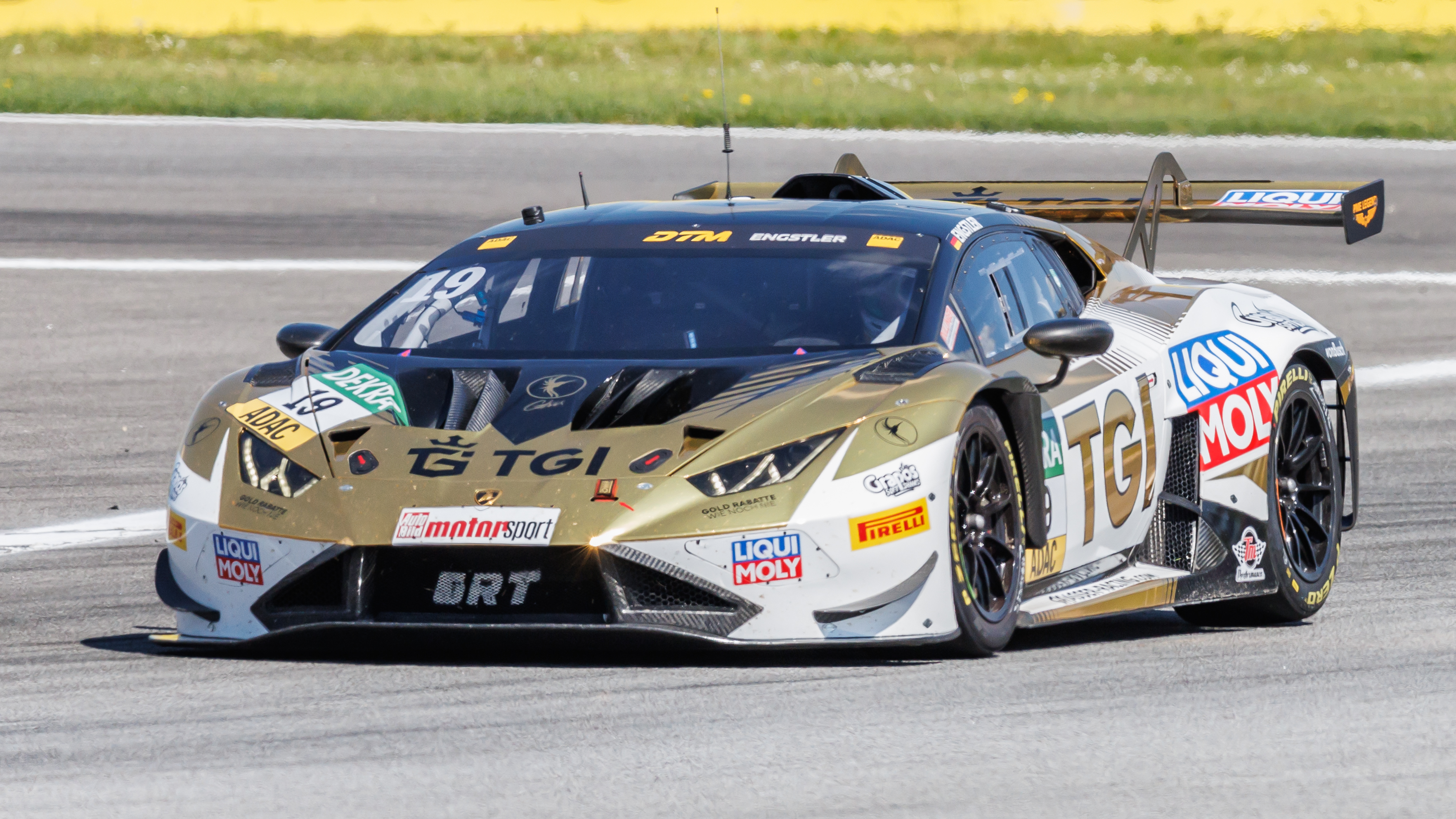
Engstler at Motorsport Arena Oschersleben in 2025

For the 2024 season, Engstler remained in the DTM, this time switching to Lamborghini customer GRT. At the opening round in Oschersleben, he qualified fourth on Sunday, a position that turned to first thanks to a fortunately-timed full-course yellow phase. He held off Maro Engel in the closing stages and took his first DTM win, eleven years after his father Franz had scored his lone WTCC victory at the same track.

== Racing record ==
=== Career summary ===
Season	Series	Team	Races	Wins	Poles	F/Laps	Podiums	Points	Position
2015	ADAC Formula 4 Championship	Engstler Motorsport	24	0	0	0	0	0	39th
2016	ADAC Formula 4 Championship	Liqui Moly Team Engstler	24	0	0	0	0	2	26th
2017	ADAC TCR Germany Touring Car Championship	Junior Team Engstler	14	0	1	0	2	175	12th
2017	TCR International Series	Junior Team Engstler	2	0	0	0	0	0	NC
2017	TCR Europe Trophy	Liqui Moly Team Engstler	2	0	0	0	0	12	8th
2017	TCR Middle East Series	Liqui Moly Team Engstler	6	1	1	0	3	79	**3rd**
2018	ADAC TCR Germany Touring Car Championship	Liqui Moly Team Engstler	6	0	0	0	2	414	**2nd**
2018	ADAC TCR Germany Touring Car Championship	Hyundai Team Engstler	8	3	1	1	4	414	**2nd**
2018	TCR Asia Series	Liqui Moly Team Engstler	10	4	3	4	7	197	**1st**
2018	TCR Middle East Series	Liqui Moly Team Engstler	5	3	2	3	5	119	**1st**
2018	24H TCE Series - TCR	Liqui Moly Team Engstler							
2019	World Touring Car Cup	BRC Hyundai N LUKOIL Racing Team	3	0	0	0	0	2	28th
2019	World Touring Car Cup	Hyundai Team Engstler	3	0	0	0	0	2	28th
2019	TCR Asia Series	Liqui Moly Team Engstler	10	6	4	8	9	221	**1st**
2019	24 Hours of Nürburgring - VT2	Hyundai Team Engstler	1	0	1	0	1	N/A	**3rd**
2019	FIA Motorsport Games Touring Car Cup	Team Germany	2	0	1	0	0	0	20th
2019	TCR Europe Touring Car Series	M1RA	14	1	0	1	2	192	9th
2020	World Touring Car Cup	Hyundai N Liqui Moly Racing Team Engstler	14	0	0	0	0	59	16th
2020	ADAC TCR Germany Touring Car Championship	Hyundai Team Engstler	2	0	0	0	0	0	NC†
2020	TCR Malaysia Touring Car Championship	Hyundai Team Engstler	6	4	2	3	4	121	**1st**
2020	24 Hours of Nürburgring - TCR	Hyundai Motorsport N	1	0	0	0	0	N/A	4th
2021	World Touring Car Cup	Engstler Hyundai N Liqui Moly Racing Team	16	0	0	0	1	86	15th
2021	ADAC TCR Germany Touring Car Championship	Hyundai Team Engstler	12	6	4	5	10	337	**1st**
2021	Nürburgring Endurance Series - VT2	ROJA Motorsport by ASL Lichtblau	1	0	0	0	0	0	NC†
2021	24 Hours of Nürburgring - TCR	Hyundai Motorsport N	1	0	0	0	1	N/A	**2nd**
2022	ADAC GT Masters	Rutronik Racing	14	0	1	0	1	104	14th
2022	Nürburgring Endurance Series - SP9	Scherer Sport Team Phoenix	1	1	0	0	1	0	NC†
2022	Nürburgring Endurance Series - TCR	Scherer Sport	1	1	1	1	1	0	NC†
2022	24H GT Series - GT3	Attempto Racing							
2022	24 Hours of Nürburgring - Cup2	IronForce Racing by Phoenix	1	0	0	0	0	N/A	5th
2023	Deutsche Tourenwagen Masters	Liqui Moly Team Engstler	16	0	0	0	0	18	24th
2023	International GT Open	Liqui Moly Team Engstler	4	0	0	0	0	4	29th
2023	GT Winter Series	Liqui Moly Team Engstler	?	?	?	?	?	30.75	31st
2023	GT World Challenge Europe Endurance Cup	Scherer Sport PHX	1	0	0	0	1	24	12th
2023	Nürburgring Endurance Series - SP9	Audi Sport Team Car Collection	1	0	0	0	0	0	NC†
2023	24 Hours of Nürburgring - SP9	Audi Sport Team Car Collection	1	0	0	0	0	N/A	13th
2024	Deutsche Tourenwagen Masters	Lamborghini Team Liqui Moly by GRT	16	2	0	1	3	92	14th
2024	FIA GT World Cup	Lamborghini Team Liqui Moly by GRT	0	0	0	0	0	N/A	DNS
2024	GT World Challenge Europe Sprint Cup	Liqui Moly Team Engstler by One Group	10	0	1	0	0	12.5	13th
2024	GT World Challenge Europe Sprint Cup - Gold Cup	Liqui Moly Team Engstler by One Group	10	2	4	2	9	107.5	**1st**
2024	Nürburgring Langstrecken-Serie - SP9	Renazzo Motor with mcchip-dkr							
2024	IMSA SportsCar Championship - GTD Pro	Iron Lynx	1	0	0	0	0	202	44th
2024	Ferrari Challenge Europe - Trofeo Pirelli (Pro)	Gohm Motorsport - Engstler	3	0	0	0	1	26	9th
2025	GT Winter Series - GT3	Engstler Motorsport							
2025	Deutsche Tourenwagen Masters	TGI Lamborghini Team by GRT	16	0	0	0	0	81	12th
2025	Nürburgring Langstrecken-Serie - SP9	Red Bull Team ABT							
2025	24 Hours of Nürburgring - SP9	Abt Sportsline	1	0	0	0	0	N/A	5th
2025	GT World Challenge Europe Endurance Cup	GRT - Grasser Racing Team	5	1	0	0	1	44	5th
2025	GT World Challenge Europe Sprint Cup	GRT - Grasser Racing Team	10	2	2	2	6	81.5	**2nd**
2025	FIA GT World Cup	Absolute Racing	1	0	0	0	0	N/A	DNF
2026	Deutsche Tourenwagen Masters	Red Bull Team Abt	15	0	1	0	1	99	12th
2026	24 Hours of Nürburgring - SP9	Red Bull Team Abt	1	0	1	0	0	N/A	DSQ
2026	Nürburgring Langstrecken-Serie - SP9	Team ABT Sportsline							
2026	GT World Challenge Europe Endurance Cup	Rutronik Racing	5	0	0	0	0	6	29th
2026	GT World Challenge Europe Sprint Cup	Rutronik Racing	10	0	0	0	2	22	14th
2026	FIA GT World Cup	Absolute Corse	1	0	0	0	1	N/A	**2nd**

†Guest driver ineligible to score points. ^{*} Season still in progress.

=== Complete ADAC Formula 4 Championship results ===
(key) (Races in bold indicate pole position) (Races in italics indicate fastest lap)

Year	Team	1	2	3	4	5	6	7	8	9	10	11	12	13	14	15	16	17	18	19	20	21	22	23	24	DC	Points
2015	Engstler Motorsport	OSC; 1; 29	OSC; 2; 27	OSC; 3 Ret	RBR; 1; 22	RBR; 2; 23	RBR; 3; 12	SPA; 1; 25	SPA; 2; 34	SPA; 3; 25	LAU; 1 Ret	LAU; 2; 21	LAU; 3; 25	NÜR; 1; 27	NÜR; 2; 23	NÜR; 3; 25	SAC; 1; 17	SAC; 2; 18	SAC; 3; 22	OSC; 1; 21	OSC; 2; 20	OSC; 3; 18	HOC; 1; 23	HOC; 2 Ret	HOC; 3; 16	39th	0
2016	Engstler Motorsport	OSC1; 1; 26	OSC1; 2; 29	OSC1; 3; 17	SAC; 1; 19	SAC; 2 Ret	SAC; 3; 12	LAU; 1 Ret	LAU; 2; 17	LAU; 3; 25	OSC2; 1; 21	OSC2; 2 Ret	OSC2; 3; 11	RBR; 1; 15	RBR; 2 Ret	RBR; 3; 9	NÜR; 1 Ret	NÜR; 2; 23	NÜR; 3; 27	ZAN; 1; 18	ZAN; 2; 18	ZAN; 3; 19	HOC; 1; 14	HOC; 2; 34	HOC; 3; 32	26th	2

=== Complete TCR International Series results ===
(key) (Races in bold indicate pole position) (Races in italics indicate fastest lap)

Year	Team	Car	1	2	3	4	5	6	7	8	9	10	11	12	13	14	15	16	17	18	19	20	DC	Points
2017	Junior Team Engstler	Volkswagen Golf GTI TCR	RIM; 1	RIM; 2	BHR; 1	BHR; 2	SPA; 1	SPA; 2	MNZ; 1	MNZ; 2	SAL; 1	SAL; 2	HUN; 1	HUN; 2	OSC; 1 Ret	OSC; 2 DNS	CHA; 1	CHA; 2	ZHE; 1	ZHE; 2	DUB; 1	DUB; 2	NC	0

=== Complete TCR ADAC Germany Touring Car Championship results ===
(key) (Races in bold indicate pole position) (Races in italics indicate fastest lap)

Year	Team	Car	1	2	3	4	5	6	7	8	9	10	11	12	13	14	DC	Points
2017	Junior Team Engstler	Volkswagen Golf GTI TCR	OSC; 1; 17	OSC; 2; 16	RBR; 1 Ret	RBR; 2; 34	OSC; 1; 3	OSC; 2; 3	ZAN; 1; 16	ZAN; 2; 9	NÜR; 1; 15	NÜR; 2; 11	**SAC**; **1**; 19	SAC; 2; 6	HOC; 1; 5	HOC; 2; 20	12th	175
2018	Liqui Moly Team Engstler	Volkswagen Golf GTI TCR	OSC; 1; 3	OSC; 2; 4	MST; 1; 6	MST; 2; 3	RBR; 1; 7	RBR; 2; 4									2nd	414
2018	Hyundai Team Engstler	Hyundai i30 N TCR							NÜR; 1; 9	NÜR; 2; 6	ZAN; 1; 5	ZAN; 2; 1	**SAC**; **1**; 1	SAC; 2; 1	HOC; 1; 3	HOC; 2; 4	2nd	414
2020	Hyundai Team Engstler	Hyundai i30 N TCR	LAU; 1	LAU; 2	NÜR; 1	NÜR; 2	HOC; 1	HOC; 2	SAC; 1	SAC; 2	RBR; 1	RBR; 2	ZAN; 1	ZAN; 2	OSC; 1 Ret	OSC; 2 Ret	NC‡	0‡
2021	Hyundai Team Engstler	Hyundai i30 N TCR	OSC; 1; 1	**OSC**; **2**; 1	RBR; 1; 2	RBR; 2; 3	**LAU**; **1**; 1	LAU; 2; 1	HOC; 1; 2	**HOC**; **2**; 1	SAC; 1; 16	SAC; 2; 2	**HOC**; **1**; 1	HOC; 2; 4	NÜR; 1	NÜR; 2	1st	337

=== Complete TCR Middle East Series results ===
(key) (Races in bold indicate pole position) (Races in italics indicate fastest lap)

Year	Team	Car	1	2	3	4	5	6	DC	Points
2018	Liqui Moly Team Engstler	Volkswagen Golf GTI TCR	YMC; 1; 3	YMC; 2; 1	**DUB**; **1**; 1	DUB; 2; 3	**BHR**; **1**; 1	BHR; 2 C	1st	119

=== Complete TCR Asia Series results ===
(key) (Races in bold indicate pole position) (Races in italics indicate fastest lap)

Year	Team	Car	1	2	3	4	5	6	7	8	9	10	DC	Points
2018	Liqui Moly Team Engstler	Volkswagen Golf GTI TCR	**SEP**; **1**; 1^{1}	SEP; 2; 3	**BUR**; **1** Ret^{1}	BUR; 2; 2	**BNS**; **1**; 6^{1}	BNS; 2 Ret	YEO; 1; 2^{1}	YEO; 2; 1	SHA; 1; 1^{2}	SHA; 1; 2	1st	197
2019	Liqui Moly Team Engstler	Hyundai i30 N TCR	**SEP**; **1**; 1^{1}	SEP; 2 Ret	**BUR**; **1**; 1^{1}	BUR; 2; 1	**BUR**; **1**; 2^{3}	BUR; 2; 1	**BUR**; **1**; 1^{1}	BUR; 2; 3	**BNS**; **1**; 2^{1}	BNS; 2; 3	1st	221

=== Complete TCR Europe Touring Car Series results ===
(key) (Races in bold indicate pole position) (Races in italics indicate fastest lap)

Year	Team	Car	1	2	3	4	5	6	7	8	9	10	11	12	13	14	DC	Points
2019	M1RA	Hyundai i30 N TCR	HUN; 1; 18	HUN; 2; 12	HOC; 1; 2	HOC; 2; 7	SPA; 1; 9	SPA; 2; 7	RBR; 1; 5	RBR; 2; 1	OSC; 1 Ret	OSC; 2; 7	CAT; 1 Ret	CAT; 2; 11	MNZ; 1 Ret	MNZ; 2; 12	9th	192

=== Complete TCR China Touring Car Championship results ===
(key) (Races in bold indicate pole position) (Races in italics indicate fastest lap)

Year	Team	Car	1	2	3	4	5	6	7	8	9	10	DC	Points
2019	Hyundai Team Engstler	Hyundai i30 N TCR	ZHU; 1	ZHU; 2	SHA; 1	SHA; 2	ZHE; 1	ZHE; 2	**NIN**; **1**; 1	NIN; 2; 1	**ZHZ**; **1**; 1	ZHZ; 2; 2	5th	73

=== Complete TCR Malaysia Touring Car Championship results ===
(key) (Races in bold indicate pole position) (Races in italics indicate fastest lap)

Year	Team	Car	1	2	3	4	5	6	DC	Points
2019	Liqui Moly Team Engstler	Hyundai i30 N TCR	SEP1; 1; 1	SEP1; 2; 1	**SEP2**; **1**; 1	SEP2; 2; 1	SEP3; 1; 2	SEP3; 2; 1	1st	142.5
2020	Liqui Moly Team Engstler	Hyundai i30 N TCR	**SEP1**; **1**; 1	SEP1; 2; 7	**SEP2**; **1**; 1	SEP2; 2 Ret	**SEP3**; **1**; 1	SEP3; 2; 1	1st	121

^{*} Season still in progress.

=== Complete World Touring Car Cup results ===
(key) (Races in bold indicate pole position) (Races in italics indicate fastest lap)

Year	Team	Car	1	2	3	4	5	6	7	8	9	10	11	12	13	14	15	16	17	18	19	20	21	22	23	24	25	26	27	28	29	30	DC	Points
2019	Hyundai Team Engstler	Hyundai i30 N TCR	MAR; 1	MAR; 2	MAR; 3	HUN; 1	HUN; 2	HUN; 3	SVK; 1; 10‡	SVK; 2 Ret	SVK; 3; 10‡	NED; 1	NED; 2	NED; 3	GER; 1	GER; 2	GER; 3	POR; 1	POR; 2	POR; 3	CHN; 1	CHN; 2	CHN; 3	JPN; 1	JPN; 2	JPN; 3							NC‡	0‡
2019	BRC Hyundai N LUKOIL Racing Team	Hyundai i30 N TCR																									MAC; 1; 16	MAC; 2 Ret	MAC; 3; 14	MAL; 1	MAL; 2	MAL; 3	28th	2
2020	Engstler Hyundai N Liqui Moly Racing Team	Hyundai i30 N TCR	BEL; 1; 12	BEL; 2; 10	GER; 1 DNP	GER; 2 DNP	SVK; 1; 22†	SVK; 2; 10	SVK; 3; 9	HUN; 1; 8	HUN; 2 Ret	HUN; 3; 16	ESP; 1; 8	ESP; 2; 9	ESP; 3 Ret	ARA; 1; 13	ARA; 2; 11	ARA; 3; 14															16th	59
2021	Engstler Hyundai N Liqui Moly Racing Team	Hyundai Elantra N TCR	GER; 1; 17	GER; 2; 2	POR; 1; 12	POR; 2 Ret	ESP; 1; 13	ESP; 2; 8	HUN; 1; 11	HUN; 2; 15	CZE; 1; 12	CZE; 2; 7	FRA; 1; 9	FRA; 2; 11	ITA; 1; 15	ITA; 2; 10	RUS; 1; 13	RUS; 2; 10															15th	86

^{†} Driver did not finish the race, but was classified as he completed over 90% of the race distance. ^{‡} As Engstler was a Wildcard entry, he was ineligible to score points.

=== Complete ADAC GT Masters results ===
(key) (Races in bold indicate pole position) (Races in italics indicate fastest lap)

Year	Team	Car	1	2	3	4	5	6	7	8	9	10	11	12	13	14	DC	Points
2022	Rutronik Racing	Audi R8 LMS Evo II	OSC; 1; 9	**OSC**; **2**; 2^{1}	RBR; 1; 9	RBR; 2; 10	ZAN; 1; 10	ZAN; 2; 18†	NÜR; 1; 4	NÜR; 2; 12	LAU; 1; 4^{2}	LAU; 2; 7	SAC; 1; 6	SAC; 2 Ret	HOC; 1; 13	HOC; 2 Ret	14th	104

=== Complete Deutsche Tourenwagen Masters results ===
(key) (Races in bold indicate pole position) (Races in italics indicate fastest lap)

Year	Entrant	Chassis	1	2	3	4	5	6	7	8	9	10	11	12	13	14	15	16	Rank	Points
2023	Liqui Moly Team Engstler	Audi R8 LMS Evo II	OSC; 1; 17	OSC; 2 DSQ	ZAN; 1; 14	ZAN; 2; 14	NOR; 1 Ret	NOR; 2; 19	NÜR; 1 Ret	NÜR; 2; 7	LAU; 1 DSQ	LAU; 2; 15	SAC; 1; 19	SAC; 2 Ret	RBR; 1; 12	RBR; 2 Ret	HOC; 1 Ret	HOC; 2; 22	24th	18
2024	Lamborghini Team Liqui Moly by GRT	Lamborghini Huracán GT3 Evo 2	OSC; 1; 11	OSC; 2; 1	LAU; 1; 14	LAU; 2; 5	ZAN; 1 Ret	ZAN; 2; 12	NOR; 1; 3	NOR; 2; 19	NÜR; 1; 18	NÜR; 2; 15	SAC; 1 Ret	SAC; 2 Ret	RBR; 1; 18	RBR; 2 Ret^{2}	HOC; 1; 15	HOC; 2; 1	14th	92
2025	TGI Team Lamborghini by GRT	Lamborghini Huracán GT3 Evo 2	OSC; 1; 10	OSC; 2; 7	LAU; 1 Ret	LAU; 2 Ret	ZAN; 1; 10^{3}	ZAN; 2; 6	NOR; 1 Ret	NOR; 2 Ret	NÜR; 1; 7^{3}	NÜR; 2; 13	SAC; 1; 11	SAC; 2; 12	RBR; 1; 10	RBR; 2; 10	HOC; 1; 9	HOC; 2; 8	12th	81
2026	Red Bull Team Abt	Lamborghini Temerario GT3	RBR; 1; 15	RBR; 2; 18	ZAN; 1; 8	ZAN; 2; 6^{3}	LAU; 1 Ret	LAU; 2; 6	NOR; 1; 14	NOR; 2; 16	OSC; 1; 2^{2}	OSC; 2; 4^{2}	NÜR; 1; 7	NÜR; 2; 6	SAC; 1 Ret	SAC; 2; 8	**HOC**; **1** Ret^{1}	HOC; 2 WD	12th	99

=== Complete GT World Challenge Europe results ===
==== GT World Challenge Europe Endurance Cup ====
(Races in bold indicate pole position) (Races in italics indicate fastest lap)

Year	Team	Car	Class	1	2	3	4	5	6	7	Pos.	Points
2023	Scherer Sport PHX	Audi R8 LMS Evo II	Pro	MNZ	LEC	SPA; 6H; 2	SPA; 12H; 12	SPA; 24H; 3	NÜR	CAT	12th	24
2025	GRT Grasser Racing Team	Lamborghini Huracán GT3 Evo 2	Pro	LEC; 12	MNZ; 46†	SPA; 6H; 23	SPA; 12H; 2	SPA; 24H; 1	NÜR; 5	CAT; 16	5th	44
2026	Rutronik Racing	Lamborghini Temerario GT3	Pro	LEC; Ret	MNZ; 7	SPA; 6H; 18	SPA; 12H; 18	SPA; 24H; 19	NÜR; 19	ALG; 50	29th	6

* Season still in progress.

==== GT World Challenge Europe Sprint Cup ====
(key) (Races in bold indicate pole position; results in italics indicate fastest lap)

Year	Team	Car	Class	1	2	3	4	5	6	7	8	9	10	Pos.	Points
2024	LIQUI MOLY Team Engstler by OneGroup	Audi R8 LMS Evo II	Gold	BRH; 1; 7	BRH; 2; 10	MIS; 1; 21	MIS; 2; 15			**MAG**; **1**; 13	**MAG**; **2**; 19	CAT; 1; 7	CAT; 2; 10	1st	107.5
2024	LIQUI MOLY Team Engstler by OneGroup	Lamborghini Huracán GT3 Evo 2	Gold					**HOC**; **1**; 6	**HOC**; **2**; 13					1st	107.5
2025	GRT - Grasser Racing Team	Lamborghini Huracán GT3 Evo 2	Pro	BRH; 1; 24	BRH; 2; 16	ZAN; 1; 2	ZAN; 2; 3	MIS; 1; 9	MIS; 2; 11	**MAG**; **1**; 1	MAG; 2; 2	VAL; 1; 1	**VAL**; **2**; 2	2nd	81.5
2026	Rutronik Racing	Lamborghini Temerario GT3	Pro	BRH; 1; 20	BRH; 2; 18	MIS; 1; 11	MIS; 2; 26	MAG; 1; 41	MAG; 2; 3	ZAN; 1; 22	ZAN; 2; 7	CAT; 1; 3	CAT; 2 Ret	14th	22

=== Complete IMSA SportsCar Championship results ===
(key) (Races in bold indicate pole position; races in italics indicate fastest lap)

Year	Entrant	Class	Make	Engine	1	2	3	4	5	6	7	8	9	10	Rank	Points
2024	Iron Lynx	GTD Pro	Lamborghini Huracán GT3 Evo 2	Lamborghini DGF 5.2 L V10	DAY	SEB	LGA	DET	WGL	MOS	ELK	VIR	IMS; 13	PET	44th	202

Sporting positions
Preceded by Tom Lautenschlager (Junior)	ADAC TCR Germany Touring Car Championship; Rookie Champion; 2017	Succeeded by Max Hesse
Preceded by Josh Files	TCR Middle East Series; Champion; 2018	Succeeded by René Münnich
Preceded by Kantadhee Kusiri	TCR Asia Series; Champion; 2018; 2019	Succeeded by Jason Zhang
Preceded by Inaugural	TCR Malaysia Touring Car Championship; Champion; 2019; 2020	Succeeded by Incumbent
Preceded by Antti Buri	ADAC TCR Germany Touring Car Championship; Champion; 2021	Succeeded by Martin Andersen
Preceded by Gilles Magnus	World Touring Car Cup; Junior Champion; 2021	Succeeded by None (Class discontinued)
Preceded by Calan Williams; Niklas Krütten	GT World Challenge Europe Sprint Cup; Gold Cup Champion; 2024; With: Max Hofer	Succeeded by Thierry Vermeulen; Chris Lulham
