= Hyundai Sungwoo Holdings =

Hyundai Sungwoo Holdings Co., Ltd.
- Industry: Automotive
- Founded: 1 May 1987; 39 years ago
- Founder: Chung Soon-yung (Younger brother of Chung Ju-yung)
- Headquarters: Seoul, South Korea
- Number of locations: Three Factories in Korea, One Factory in China, Offices in Tokyo, Frankfurt, and Montgomery.
- Area served: Worldwide
- Key people: Chung Mong-yong (CEO)
- Products: Iron castings; brake discs; alloy wheels; automobile and industrial batteries
- Services: Logistics
- Number of employees: 1,300 (approximately)
- Subsidiaries: Hyundai Sungwoo Casting, Hyundai Sungwoo Solite, Hyundai Sungwoo Metal, Hyundai Sungwoo Auto USA
- Website: http://hdswholdings.com/

Hyundai Sungwoo Holdings Co, Ltd. (Korean: 현대성우홀딩스(주)) is a South Korean automotive and auto parts company headquartered in Seoul, South Korea. Chung Soon-yung, the younger brother of Hyundai Group founder Chung Ju-yung, established Sungwoo Automotive in 1987 as part of the Sungwoo Group, which operated Hyundai Cement, Sungwoo Construction, and Hyundai Sungwoo Ski Resort.

Youngest son of Chung Soon-yung, Chung Mong-yong took over the company in the late 1990s and has expanded the company's products from iron castings to alloy wheels, batteries, and more. The company has changed its name to Hyundai Sungwoo Automotive Korea in the 2000s and now operates as Hyundai Sungwoo Holdings. Hyundai Sungwoo Holdings serves as the parent company, with subsidiaries including Hyundai Sungwoo Casting (Iron Castings and Brake Discs), Hyundai Sungwoo Solite (Automotive and Industrial Batteries), Hyundai Sungwoo Metal (Alloy Wheels), and global establishments in USA under Hyundai Sungwoo Auto USA and China under Hyundai Sungwoo Longkou. The current CEO of Hyundai Sungwoo Holdings is Chung Mong-yong, younger cousin of Hyundai Motor Group Chairman Chung Mong Koo. The company specializes in customized engine parts, suspension parts, alloy wheels, and other car accessories.

== Products ==
Hyundai Sungwoo Automotive Korea's principal products are:

- engine parts;
- suspension parts;
- alloy wheels; and
- automotive/industrial batteries.

== Motorsport ==
Hyundai Sungwoo Group has been supporting Motorsports in South Korea for over twenty years. The company officially established its own racing arm, Indigo Racing Team, in 1997. The longest running racing team in Korea - Indigo Racing Team has competed in various GT, touring car and open wheel racing series primarily in South Korea. Following its 20th anniversary, the team announced its plans to enter global races partnering with automakers in their customer racing programs. Most recently, the team has partnered with Hyundai Motorsport to enter i30 N TCR in the TCR Asia Series in 2019 following the clinching of the TCR Korea Touring Car Series Title in 2018. The team also has partnered with AMG Customer Racing Department to operate the AMG GT3 in 2019 Blancpain GT World Challenge Asia and 2018 Blancpain GT Series Asia. Indigo Racing Team's Title sponsor company is Solite Battery, hence officially operating under Solite Indigo Racing.

== See also ==
- Economy of South Korea
- Hyundai
