= Harald Proczyk =

Austrian racing driver (born 1975)

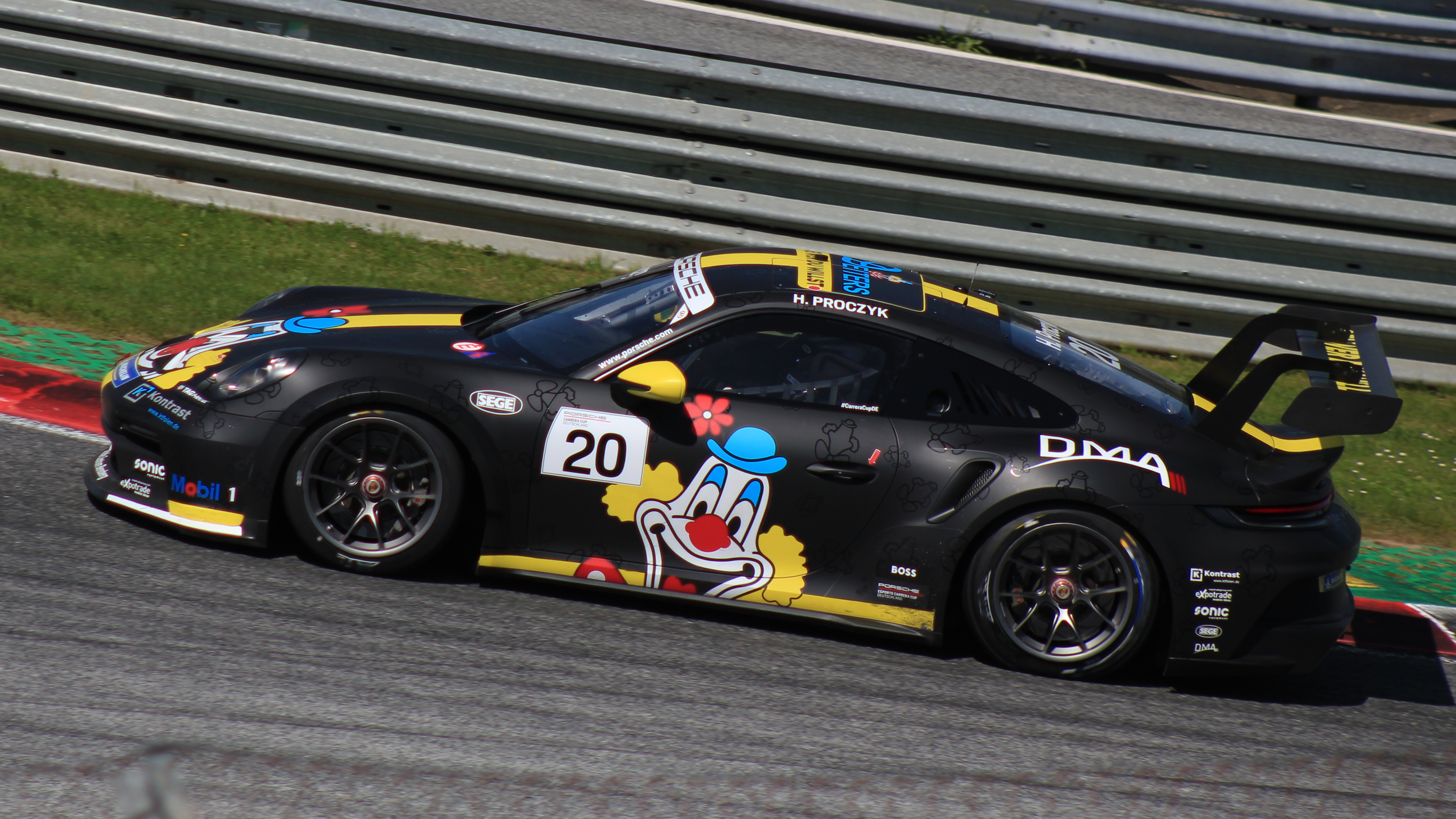
- Nationality: (Austria) Austrian
- Born: 9 November 1975 (age 50) Knittelfeld, Austria

TCR International Series career
- Debut season: 2016
- Current team: WestCoast Racing
- Categorisation: FIA Silver
- Car number: 43
- Starts: 2
- Poles: 1

Previous series
- 2016 2015 2015 2014 2013 2013 2012 2012 2011-15 2007-10 2006 2003-06 2001 2001-02 1999 1999 1998, 00: ADAC TCR Germany; 24H Series; International GT Open; Blancpain Sprint Series; Blancpain Endurance Series; FIA GT Series; FIA GT3 European Championship; British GT; ADAC GT Masters; MINI Challenge Germany; Renault Clio Cup Germany; Ford Fiesta Cup Germany; Porsche Carrera Cup Germany; Ford Puma Cup Germany; Formula König; German Touring Car Challenge; Citroën Saxo Cup Germany

Harald "Hari" Proczyk (born 9 November 1975) is an Austrian racing driver currently competing in the TCR International Series. Having previously competed in the ADAC TCR Germany Series, Blancpain Sprint Series & ADAC GT Masters amongst others.

== Racing career ==
=== Touring Cars ===
Proczyk began his career in 1998 in the German Citroën Saxo Cup, he raced there for two seasons finishing second in the standings both years, before switching to the German Touring Car Challenge. In 1999, he switched to the German Formula König championship, he raced there for a single season and finished 16th in the championship standings that year. He switched to German Ford Puma Cup in 2001, he finished ninth in the championship standings in 2002, before switching to the German Ford Fiesta Cup in 2003. While racing in the German Ford Puma Cup that year, he also took part in the Porsche Carrera Cup Germany championship. He raced their up until 2006, finishing second in the championship standings in 2004 & 2005. While racing his last season in the German Ford Fiesta Cup, he also raced in the German Renault Clio Cup, taking three wins and five podiums on his way to finishing third in Clio Cup standings that season. In 2007, he switched to the German MINI Challenge, racing their for many season up until 2010, taking several wins and podiums as well as finishing second in the standings in 2007, 2008 & 2010.

=== GT Racing ===
For 2011, Proczyk made the switch to the ADAC GT Masters racing a Mercedes-Benz SLS AMG GT3 for Heico Motorsport, partnering Dominik Baumann and finishing fifth in the standings that year. The duo continued with Heico Motorsport for 2012, finishing ninth in the standings that year. He only made two one-off appearances in 2013 & 2014 before making a full season return to the championship in 2015, where he again finished fifth in the championship standings. In 2012, he switched to the FIA GT3 European Championship, while racing there he also made two one-off appearances in the 2012 British GT Championship. Meanwhile, he had a great season in the FIA GT3 European Championship, only having one retirement and only failing to finish on the podium once, he raced for the Rhino's Leipert Motorsport team in a Lamborghini Gallardo LP600+ GT3 shared with David Mengesdorf. The duo finished third in the standings that year. For 2013, he switched to the FIA GT Series and Blancpain Endurance Series starting the season as a double program with GRT Grasser Racing Team driving a Lamborghini Gallardo LP 560–4. However, they only raced in the first three rounds of the 2013 Blancpain Endurance Series, while still going on to do a full season in the 2013 FIA GT Series, with Proczyk finishing second in the Pro-Am standings that year. In 2014, he stayed in the series, now named Blancpain Sprint Series, again teaming up with Grasser Racing Team and racing an updated Lamborghini Gallardo FL2 partnered by Jeroen Bleekemolen. The pair took several victories and podiums on their way to finishing third in the Pro Cup championship standings that year. Alongside his 2015 ADAC GT Masters program, he also made a one-off appearance in the 2015 International GT Open, as well as entering four races in the 2015 24H Series.

=== Return to Touring Cars ===
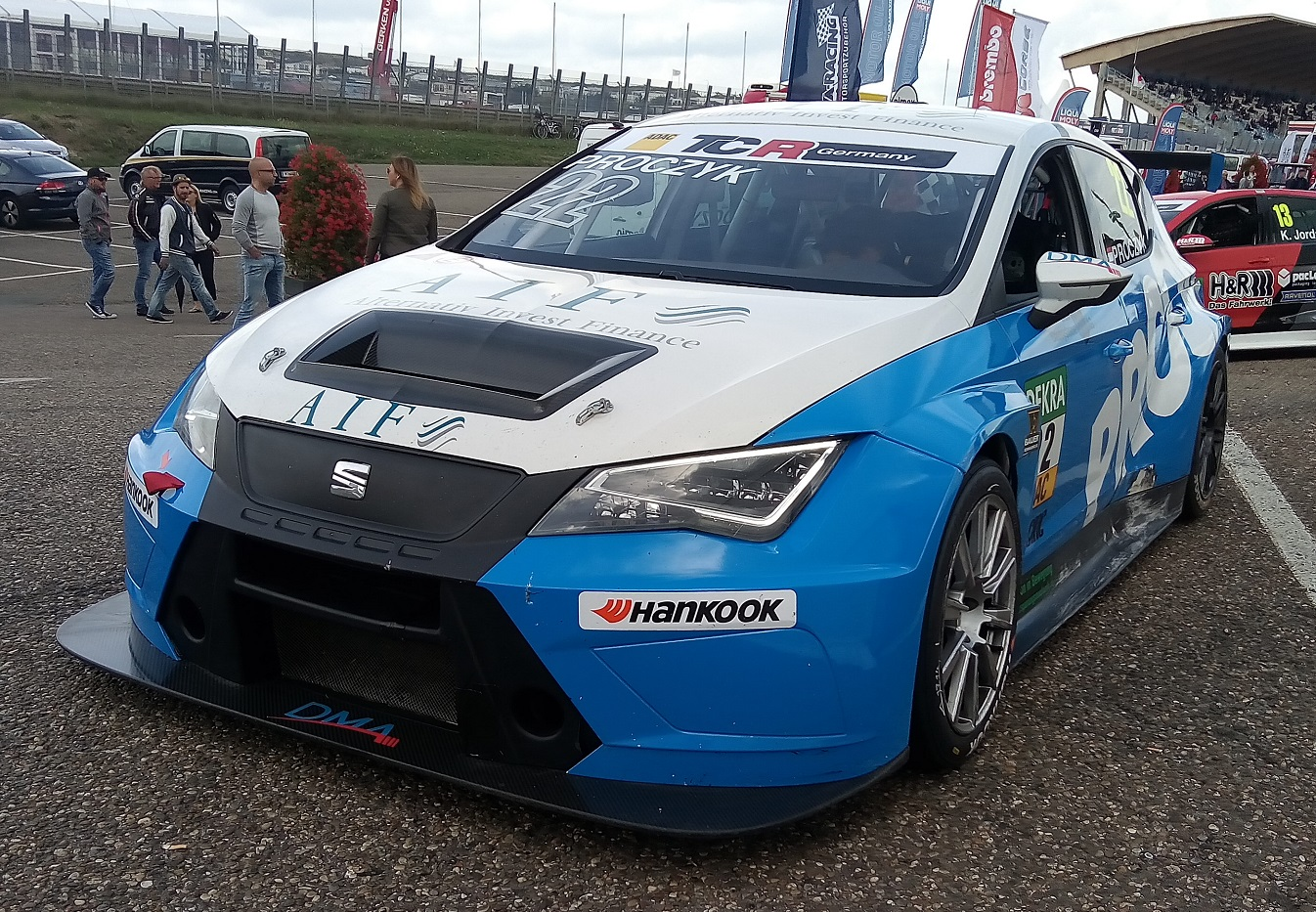

For 2016, Proczyk switched to the new-for-2016 ADAC TCR Germany series, driving a SEAT León Cup Racer for his own team HP Racing. He took his first pole position at the second round of the championship held at Sachsenring, he then went on to take a lights-to-flag victory in the first race of the day. He currently leads the 2016 championship standings.

In June 2016, it was announced that Proczyk would race in the TCR International Series, driving a Honda Civic TCR for WestCoast Racing. He took a pole position in a rain hit qualifying session at the Salzburgring, but was giving a two-place grid penalty for Race 1 after having driven out of the pits into the fast lane before the green flag was waved following a brief red flag stoppage. He did however get to keep the five points awarded for qualifying on pole position.

== Racing record ==
=== Complete TCR International Series results ===
(key) (Races in bold indicate pole position) (Races in italics indicate fastest lap)

Year	Team	Car	1	2	3	4	5	6	7	8	9	10	11	12	13	14	15	16	17	18	19	20	21	22	DC	Points
2016	WestCoast Racing	Honda Civic TCR	BHR; 1	BHR; 2	POR; 1	POR; 2	BEL; 1	BEL; 2	ITA; 1	ITA; 2	**AUT**; **1** Ret	AUT; 2 Ret	GER; 1	GER; 2	RUS; 1	RUS; 2	THA; 1	THA; 2	SIN; 1	SIN; 2	MYS; 1	MYS; 2	MAC; 1	MAC; 2	23rd	5
