= Engstler Motorsport =

German auto racing team in Wiggensbach

(Germany) Engstler Motorsport
- Team principal(s): Franz Engstler
- Current series: Deutsche Tourenwagen Masters; ADAC GT Masters; International GT Open
- Former series: ATCC; WTCC; TCR International Series; ETCC; ADAC Procar Series; ADAC Formula 4 WTCR; ADAC TCR Germany
- Current drivers: WTCR (Hungary) Attila Tassi (Portugal) Tiago Monteiro (Germany) Roland Hertner (Denmark) Martin Andersen (Poland) Szymon Ładniak
- Teams' Championships: 2011 Ind. WTCC
- Drivers' Championships: 2005 ATCC (Engstler); 2006 ATCC (Engstler); 2007 ADAC Procar (Engstler); 2008 ATCC (Lemvard); 2011 Ind. WTCC (Poulsen)

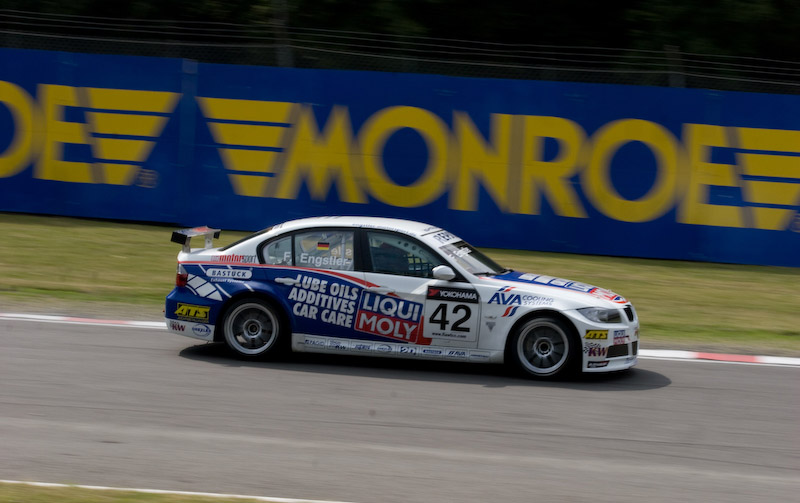
Franz Engstler at Brands Hatch in the 2008 WTCC

Engstler Motorsport is a private German auto racing team based in Wiggensbach, run by driver Franz Engstler. It has competed successfully in the Asian Touring Car Championship and the ADAC Procar Series. It is sponsored by lubricants company Liqui Moly and known officially as Liqui Moly Team Engstler.

== World Touring Car Championship ==
=== BMW 320i (2005, 2007) ===
The team made its World Touring Car Championship debut in the end of season 2005 Guia Race of Macau, with two BMW 320is for Hong Kong driver Paul Poon and New Zealander Peter Scharmach. While Poon failed to qualify for the race, Scharmach finished 16th in the first race, but retired in the second.

The team returned to the WTCC at Macau two years later, running three 320is for Franz Engstler, Andrei Romanov and David Louie. They finished 19th, 24th and 25th respectively in the first race, while in the second race Engstler came home 16th, while Romanov and Louie retired. Having only competed in the final event the team still managed to finish seventh in the independent team's trophy.

=== BMW 320si (2008–2010) ===
Engstler and Romanov competed full-time in 2008 in BMW 320sis, with Engstler scoring three points in the Overall Championship, finishing second in the Independent's Trophy, with Romanov finishing fifth. Japan's Masaki Kano competed in an older 320i model in the final two rounds of the series. The team finished second in the independent team's standings behind fellow BMW team Proteam Motorsport.

Dane Kristian Poulsen was brought in to race alongside Franz Engstler in 2009. Engstler was leading at the end of the first lap of the second race at the Race of France when he and the safety car collided, taking him out of the race. For the Race of UK and Race of Germany, the team ran a third car for ADAC Procar Series champion Philip Geipel. Macanese driver Henry Ho made his series debut with the team at the Race of Japan while Kano returned for the race. The team ran five cars at the Race of Macau, Engstler, Poulsen and Ho were joined by series debutants Alex Liu and Jo Merszei.

Engstler was paired with Romanov for the full 2010 World Touring Car Championship season. Romanov was unable to attend the Race of UK and was replaced by SEAT León Eurocup driver Tim Coronel. The team ran an additional car at the Race of Japan for Yoshihiro Ito, they then ran two extra cars alongside Engstler and Romanov at the Race of Macau for Kano and Merszei.

=== BMW 320 TC and BMW 320si (2011–present) ===
The team ran the new BMW 320 TC chassis for the 2011 season with team owner Franz Engstler being paired with Kristian Poulsen who returned to the team after a year driving for his own team. Poulsen took the team's first podium finish in race two of the Race of Italy went he finished third behind Robert Huff and Yvan Muller. Engstler then took his and the team's first WTCC victory in race two of their home race. Formula D driver Charles Ng joined the team for the Race of Japan where he drove an older BMW 320si. Fabio Fabiani took over the third car for the Race of China having moved across from Proteam Racing while Charles Ng moving to DeTeam KK Motorsport. Fabiani wrapped up the Jay–Ten Trophy for drivers in natural aspirated cars in China while the team secured the independent team's trophy title. Fabiani was replaced for the Race of Macau by local driver Jo Merszei. Poulsen secured the Yokohama Independent Drivers' Trophy title.

Team Engstler entered the 2012 World Touring Car Championship season with team owner Engstler as their first driver. Charles Ng was later confirmed in their second car for the full season having joined to the team for the Race of Japan the previous season. Masaki Kano joined the team for the Race of Japan, driving a naturally aspirated BMW 320si. Alex Liu then took over the car for the Race of China. At the season finale in Macau, Merszei raced the team's third car.

The team returned to the WTCC for the 2013 season, retaining their lineup of Engstler and Ng.

== Results ==
=== World Touring Car Championship ===
Year	Car	Drivers	Races	Wins	Poles	F.L.	Points	D.C.	T.C.
2005	BMW 320i	(New Zealand) Peter Scharmach	2	0	0	0	0	NC	NC
2005	BMW 320i	(Hong Kong) Paul Poon	0	0	0	0	0	NC	NC
2007	BMW 320i	(Germany) Franz Engstler	2	0	0	0	0	NC	7th
2007	BMW 320i	(Russia) Andrey Romanov	2	0	0	0	0	NC	7th
2007	BMW 320i	(Hong Kong) David Louie	2	0	0	0	0	NC	7th
2008	BMW 320si	(Germany) Franz Engstler	24	0	0	0	3	17th	2nd
2008	BMW 320si	(Russia) Andrei Romanov	22	0	0	0	0	NC	2nd
2008	BMW 320i	(Japan) Masaki Kano	3	0	0	0	0	NC	2nd
2009	BMW 320si	(Germany) Franz Engstler	24	0	0	0	7	16th	3rd
2009	BMW 320si	(Denmark) Kristian Poulsen	24	0	0	0	0	NC	3rd
2009	BMW 320si	(Germany) Philip Geipel	4	0	0	0	0	NC	3rd
2009	BMW 320si	(Macau) Henry Ho	4	0	0	0	0	NC	3rd
2009	BMW 320si	(Japan) Masaki Kano	2	0	0	0	0	NC	3rd
2009	BMW 320si	(Macau) Jo Merszei	2	0	0	0	0	NC	3rd
2009	BMW 320si	(Macau) Alex Liu	1	0	0	0	0	NC	3rd
2010	BMW 320si	(Germany) Franz Engstler	21	0	0	0	5	17th	3rd
2010	BMW 320si	(Russia) Andrei Romanov	18	0	0	0	0	NC	3rd
2010	BMW 320si	(Netherlands) Tim Coronel	2	0	0	0	0	NC	3rd
2010	BMW 320si	(Japan) Yoshihiro Ito	2	0	0	0	0	NC	3rd
2010	BMW 320si	(Macau) Jo Merszei	2	0	0	0	0	NC	3rd
2010	BMW 320si	(Japan) Masaki Kano	2	0	0	0	0	NC	3rd
2011	BMW 320 TC	(Denmark) Kristian Poulsen	24	0	0	0	112	7th	1st
2011	BMW 320 TC	(Germany) Franz Engstler	24	1	0	0	88	8th	1st
2011	BMW 320si	(Hong Kong) Charles Ng	2	0	0	0	1	22nd	1st
2011	BMW 320si	(Italy) Fabio Fabiani	2	0	0	0	0	NC	1st
2011	BMW 320si	(Macau) Jo Merszei	2	0	0	0	0	NC	1st
2012	BMW 320 TC	(Germany) Franz Engstler	24	0	0	0	64	12th	7th
2012	BMW 320 TC	(Hong Kong) Charles Ng	23	0	0	0	1	25th	7th
2012	BMW 320si	(Macau) Jo Merszei	2	0	0	0	0	NC	7th
2012	BMW 320si	(Japan) Masaki Kano	2	0	0	0	0	NC	7th
2012	BMW 320si	(Macau) Alex Liu	2	0	0	0	0	NC	7th
2013	BMW 320 TC	(Hong Kong) Charles Ng	24	0	0	0	7	18th	11th
2013	BMW 320 TC	(Germany) Franz Engstler	22	0	0	0	4	21st	11th
2013	BMW 320 TC	(Japan) Masaki Kano	2	0	0	0	0	NC	11th
2013	BMW 320si	(Macau) Henry Ho	6	0	0	0	2	23rd	11th
2013	BMW 320si	(Macau) Jo Merszei	2	0	0	0	0	NC	11th
2014	BMW 320 TC	(Germany) Franz Engstler	23	0	0	0	8	17th	6th
2014	BMW 320 TC	(Italy) Pasquale Di Sabatino	13	0	0	0	2	20th	6th
2014	BMW 320 TC	(Macau) Felipe De Souza	8	0	0	0	0	NC	6th
2014	BMW 320 TC	(Argentina) Camilo Echevarría	2	0	0	0	0	NC	6th

=== World Touring Car Cup ===
Year	Car	Drivers	Races	Wins	Poles	F.L.	Points	D.C.	T.C.
2019	Hyundai i30 N TCR	(Germany) Luca Engstler	3	0	0	0	0	NC	NC
2019	Hyundai i30 N TCR	(Malaysia) Hafizh Syahrin	3	0	0	0	0	NC	NC
2019	Hyundai i30 N TCR	(Malaysia) Mitchell Cheah	3	0	0	0	0	NC	NC
2020	Hyundai i30 N TCR	(Germany) Luca Engstler	14	0	0	0	59	16th	8th
2020	Hyundai i30 N TCR	(Netherlands) Nicky Catsburg	5	1	0	1	53	17th	8th
2020	Hyundai i30 N TCR	(Malaysia) Mitchell Cheah	3	0	0	0	4	22nd	8th
2020	Hyundai i30 N TCR	(United Kingdom) Josh Files	3	0	0	0	9	21st	8th
2020	Hyundai i30 N TCR	(Austria) Nico Gruber	3	0	0	0	3	23rd	8th
2021	Hyundai Elantra N TCR	(France) Jean-Karl Vernay	16	2	0	2	177	3rd	5th
2021	Hyundai Elantra N TCR	(Germany) Luca Engstler	16	0	0	0	86	15th	5th
2022	Honda Civic Type R TCR (FK8)	(Hungary) Attila Tassi	16	0	0	0	83	13th	8th
2022	Honda Civic Type R TCR (FK8)	(Portugal) Tiago Monteiro	16	0	0	0	70	15th	8th

=== ADAC Formula 4 ===
Year	Car	Drivers	Races	Wins	Poles	F.L.	Points	D.C.	T.C.
2015	Tatuus F4-T014	(Germany) Luca Engstler	24	0	0	0	0	39th	N/A
2015	Tatuus F4-T014	(Germany) Michelle Halder	21	0	0	0	0	47th	N/A
2016	Tatuus F4-T014	(Germany) Luca Engstler	24	0	0	0	2	26th	11th
2016	Tatuus F4-T014	(Germany) Michelle Halder	15	0	0	0	0	46th	11th

=== Deutsche Tourenwagen Masters ===
Year	Car	Drivers	Races	Wins	Poles	F/Laps	Podiums	Points	D.C.	T.C.
2023	Audi R8 LMS Evo II	(Germany) Luca Engstler	16	0	0	0	0	18	24th	14th
