= 2019 TCR Europe Touring Car Series =

European motorsport championship

The 2019 TCR Europe Touring Car Series was the fourth season of TCR Europe Touring Car Series, and second held as a standalone series. The season began at the Hungaroring in April and ended at the Autodromo Nazionale Monza in October.

As part of a deal with the series' promoters, at five of the seven events, the 2019 TCR BeNeLux Touring Car Championship series is held which is its fourth edition. Also a third competition will be held with the establishment of the TCR Eastern Europe Trophy which will be held on two of the seven events of the calendar, as well as having four standalone events.

Mikel Azcona is the defending drivers' champion, while Hell Energy Racing with KCMG are the defending teams' champions. In TCR BeNeLux Jean-Karl Vernay is the defending drivers' champion while Leopard Lukoil Team WRT are the defending teams' champions.

== Calendar ==
The calendar was announced on 5 December 2018 with 7 rounds scheduled. The second round, which was scheduled to be held at unknown venue in the Netherlands, was replaced on 28 January 2019 with Hockenheimring. Five of the seven events from the calendar are also valid for the TCR BeNeLux Touring Car Championship.

Rnd.		Circuit/Location	Date	Supporting
1	1	Hungaroring, Budapest, Hungary	28 April	World Touring Car Cup; TCR Eastern Europe Trophy
1	2	Hungaroring, Budapest, Hungary	28 April	World Touring Car Cup; TCR Eastern Europe Trophy
2	3	Hockenheimring, Hockenheim, Germany	25–26 May	International GT Open
2	4	Hockenheimring, Hockenheim, Germany	25–26 May	International GT Open
3	5	Circuit de Spa-Francorchamps, Stavelot, Belgium	8–9 June	International GT Open; Touring Car Trophy
3	6	Circuit de Spa-Francorchamps, Stavelot, Belgium	8–9 June	International GT Open; Touring Car Trophy
4	7	Red Bull Ring, Spielberg, Austria	13–14 July	
4	8	Red Bull Ring, Spielberg, Austria	13–14 July	
5	9	Motorsport Arena Oschersleben, Oschersleben, Germany	3–4 August	
5	10	Motorsport Arena Oschersleben, Oschersleben, Germany	3–4 August	
6	11	Circuit de Barcelona-Catalunya, Montmeló, Spain	21–22 September	International GT Open; TCR Ibérico Touring Car Series
6	12	Circuit de Barcelona-Catalunya, Montmeló, Spain	21–22 September	International GT Open; TCR Ibérico Touring Car Series
7	13	Autodromo Nazionale Monza, Monza, Italy	12–13 October	International GT Open; TCR Eastern Europe Trophy
7	14	Autodromo Nazionale Monza, Monza, Italy	12–13 October	International GT Open; TCR Eastern Europe Trophy

== Teams and drivers ==
Team	Car	No.	Drivers	Class	Rounds
(Belgium) Boutsen Ginion Racing	Honda Civic Type R TCR (FK8)	2	(Belgium) Stéphane Lémeret	BNL	1
(Belgium) Boutsen Ginion Racing	Honda Civic Type R TCR (FK8)	50	(Netherlands) Tom Coronel	BNL	2–7
(Georgia (country)) PCR Sport With Georgia	CUPRA León TCR	3	(Georgia (country)) Davit Kajaia		1–5
(Spain) PCR Sport	CUPRA León TCR	27	(France) John Filippi		6–7
(Qatar) QMMF Racing by PCR Sport	CUPRA León TCR	96	(Qatar) Abdulla Ali Al-Khelaifi		1–3, 5–7
(Switzerland) Wolf-Power Racing	Renault Mégane R.S TCR	5	(United Kingdom) Alex Morgan		1–2
(Switzerland) Wolf-Power Racing	CUPRA León TCR	5	(United Kingdom) Alex Morgan		4–6
(Belgium) DG Sport Compétition	Peugeot 308 TCR	7	(France) Aurélien Comte	BNL	All
(Hungary) M1RA	Hyundai i30 N TCR	8	(Germany) Luca Engstler		All
(Hungary) M1RA	Hyundai i30 N TCR	67	(Hungary) Zsolt Szabó		5–6
(Hungary) M1RA	Hyundai i30 N TCR	99	(Hungary) Dániel Nagy		1–4
(Italy) Target Competition (Note: Cars No. 9, 62 and 70 are entered as Autodis Racing by Target Competition in TCR Benelux events.) (Luxembourg) Autodis Racing by Target Competition	Hyundai i30 N TCR	9	(United Kingdom) Josh Files	BNL	All
(Italy) Target Competition (Luxembourg) Autodis Racing by Target Competition	Hyundai i30 N TCR	19	(Sweden) Andreas Bäckman		All
(Italy) Target Competition (Luxembourg) Autodis Racing by Target Competition	Hyundai i30 N TCR	26	(Sweden) Jessica Bäckman		All
(Italy) Target Competition (Luxembourg) Autodis Racing by Target Competition	Hyundai i30 N TCR	58	(Austria) Dominik Baumann		5–7
(Italy) Target Competition (Luxembourg) Autodis Racing by Target Competition	Hyundai i30 N TCR	62	(Serbia) Dušan Borković	BNL	1–4
(Italy) Target Competition (Luxembourg) Autodis Racing by Target Competition	Hyundai i30 N TCR	70	(Slovakia) Maťo Homola	BNL	All
(North Macedonia) PSS Racing Team	Honda Civic Type R TCR (FK8)	10	(North Macedonia) Viktor Davidovski		All
(France) M Racing	Hyundai i30 N TCR	12	(France) Nelson Panciatici		All
(France) M Racing	Hyundai i30 N TCR	25	(France) Natan Bihel		All
(Russia) VRC-Team	Audi RS 3 LMS TCR	14	(Russia) Klim Gavrilov		3, 7
(Belgium) Comtoyou Racing	Audi RS 3 LMS TCR	15	(Morocco) Sami Taoufik	BNL	7
(Belgium) Comtoyou Racing	Audi RS 3 LMS TCR	16	(Belgium) Gilles Magnus	BNL	All
(Slovakia) Brutal Fish Racing Team	Honda Civic Type R TCR (FK8)	17	(Slovakia) Martin Ryba		All
(Slovakia) Brutal Fish Racing Team	Honda Civic Type R TCR (FK8)	18	(Hong Kong) Paul Ip		7
(Slovakia) Brutal Fish Racing Team	Honda Civic Type R TCR (FK8)	22	(Australia) Josh Burdon		7
(Slovakia) Brutal Fish Racing Team	Honda Civic Type R TCR (FK8)	123	(United Kingdom) Daniel Lloyd		2–7
(France) JSB Compétition	CUPRA León TCR	21	(France) Marie Baus-Coppens	BNL	1–3, 6–7
(France) JSB Compétition	Peugeot 308 TCR	24	(France) Julien Briché	BNL	All
(France) JSB Compétition	Peugeot 308 TCR	44	(France) Lilou Wadoux	BNL	1–3
(Hungary) Zengő Motorsport	CUPRA León TCR	23	(Hungary) Tamás Tenke		2–7
(Switzerland) Vuković Motorsport	Renault Mégane R.S TCR	27	(France) John Filippi		1–5
(Switzerland) Vuković Motorsport	Renault Mégane R.S TCR	85	(Brazil) Guilherme Salas		7
(Switzerland) Vuković Motorsport	Renault Mégane R.S TCR	100	(United Kingdom) Jack Young		6
(Italy) BRC Racing Team	Hyundai i30 N TCR	30	(Italy) Luca Filippi		All
(Norway) Stian Paulsen Racing	CUPRA León TCR	34	(Norway) Stian Paulsen		2–4, 7
(United Kingdom) Essex & Kent Motorsport	Hyundai i30 N TCR	38	(United Kingdom) Lewis Kent		3
(Sweden) WestCoast Racing	Volkswagen Golf GTI TCR	45	(Italy) Gianni Morbidelli		All
(Sweden) WestCoast Racing	Volkswagen Golf GTI TCR	46	(Finland) Olli Parhankangas		All
(Belgium) Team WRT	Audi RS 3 LMS TCR	55	(Uruguay) Santiago Urrutia	BNL	All
(Belgium) Team WRT	Volkswagen Golf GTI TCR	88	(Belgium) Maxime Potty	BNL	All
(Belgium) Team WRT	Volkswagen Golf GTI TCR	116	(United Kingdom) Ashley Sutton	BNL	3
(France) Team Clairet Sport	Peugeot 308 TCR	66	(France) Gilles Colombani		4, 6
(France) Team Clairet Sport	Peugeot 308 TCR	77	(France) Sylvain Poussier		5
(France) Team Clairet Sport	Peugeot 308 TCR	81	(France) Stéphane Ventaja		1–3
(France) Team Clairet Sport	Peugeot 308 TCR	111	(France) Teddy Clairet		All
(France) Team Clairet Sport	Peugeot 308 TCR	112	(France) Jimmy Clairet		All
(Russia) Carville Racing	Volkswagen Golf GTI TCR	91	(Russia) Grigoriy Burlutskiy		7
(Poland) Legutko Racing – ADAC Berlin	Honda Civic Type R TCR (FK2)	117	(Poland) Albert Legutko		7
(Estonia) ALM Honda Racing	Honda Civic Type R TCR (FK8)	204	(Estonia) Robin Vaks		6
(Estonia) ALM Honda Racing	Honda Civic Type R TCR (FK8)	223	(Estonia) Mattias Vahtel		6
(Spain) Tecnicars Racing Team	CUPRA León TCR	216	(Russia) Evgeny Leonov		6
(Portugal) Team Novadriver	Audi RS 3 LMS TCR	224	(Portugal) Gustavo Moura		6
(Portugal) Veloso Motorsport	CUPRA León TCR	226	(Portugal) Francisco Mora		6
(Austria) RTM Motorsport	Volkswagen Golf GTI TCR	307	(Poland) Maciej Łaszkiewicz		1
(Czech Republic) Fullín Race Academy	CUPRA León TCR	322	(Germany) Carol Wittke		1
(Czech Republic) Fullín Race Academy	CUPRA León TCR	376	(Czech Republic) Petr Čížek		1
(Czech Republic) GT2 Motorsport	Volkswagen Golf GTI TCR	324	(Czech Republic) Jáchym Galáš		1
(Serbia) ASK Vesnić	CUPRA León TCR	331	(Serbia) Milovan Vesnić		1
(Serbia) ASK Vesnić	Honda Civic Type R TCR (FK2)	377	(Poland) Jakub Wyszomirski		1
(Serbia) GM Racing	Audi RS 3 LMS TCR	332	(Serbia) Rudolf Pešović		1
(Czech Republic) K2 Engineering	Hyundai i30 N TCR	359	(Czech Republic) Dušan Kouřil		1
(Croatia) Auto Klub Dubrovnik Racing	CUPRA León TCR	374	(Croatia) Žarko Knego		1

Icon	Class
BNL	Eligible for TCR BeNeLux Touring Car Championship

=== Mid-season changes ===
- Following a post-race altercation with Natan Bihel after the second race at the Red Bull Ring, Dušan Borković was banned from participating in all remaining rounds of the season.

== Results and standings ==
=== Season summary ===
Rnd.		Circuit/Location	Date	Pole position	Fastest lap	Winning driver	Winning team	TCR BeNeLux Winner
1	1	(Hungary) Hungaroring	28 April	(Slovakia) Maťo Homola	(France) Nelson Panciatici	(Slovakia) Maťo Homola	(Luxembourg) Autodis Racing by Target Competition	(Slovakia) Maťo Homola
1	2	(Hungary) Hungaroring	28 April		(United Kingdom) Josh Files	(France) Julien Briché	(France) JSB Compétition	(France) Julien Briché
2	3	(Germany) Hockenheimring	25–26 May	(United Kingdom) Josh Files	(United Kingdom) Josh Files	(United Kingdom) Josh Files	(Luxembourg) Autodis Racing by Target Competition	(United Kingdom) Josh Files
2	4	(Germany) Hockenheimring	25–26 May		(Sweden) Andreas Bäckman	(France) Julien Briché	(France) JSB Compétition	(France) Julien Briché
3	5	(Belgium) Circuit de Spa-Francorchamps	8–9 June	(Belgium) Gilles Magnus	(Uruguay) Santiago Urrutia	(Belgium) Gilles Magnus	(Belgium) Comtoyou Racing	(Belgium) Gilles Magnus
3	6	(Belgium) Circuit de Spa-Francorchamps	8–9 June		(Serbia) Dušan Borković	(France) Julien Briché	(France) JSB Compétition	(France) Julien Briché
4	7	(Austria) Red Bull Ring	13–14 July	(Italy) Luca Filippi	(United Kingdom) Josh Files	(United Kingdom) Josh Files	(Luxembourg) Autodis Racing by Target Competition	Not Held
4	8	(Austria) Red Bull Ring	13–14 July		(Belgium) Maxime Potty	(Germany) Luca Engstler	(Hungary) M1RA	Not Held
5	9	(Germany) Motorsport Arena Oschersleben	3–4 August	(Sweden) Andreas Bäckman	(France) Nelson Panciatici	(United Kingdom) Daniel Lloyd	(Slovakia) Brutal Fish Racing Team	Not Held
5	10	(Germany) Motorsport Arena Oschersleben	3–4 August		(Germany) Luca Engstler	(United Kingdom) Alex Morgan	(Switzerland) Wolf-Power Racing	Not Held
6	11	(Spain) Circuit de Barcelona-Catalunya	21–22 September	(Sweden) Andreas Bäckman	(France) Julien Briché	(Sweden) Andreas Bäckman	(Italy) Target Competition	(France) Julien Briché
6	12	(Spain) Circuit de Barcelona-Catalunya	21–22 September		(Belgium) Gilles Magnus	(United Kingdom) Daniel Lloyd	(Slovakia) Brutal Fish Racing Team	(Belgium) Gilles Magnus
7	13	(Italy) Autodromo Nazionale Monza	12–13 October	(France) Julien Briché	(United Kingdom) Josh Files	(France) Julien Briché	(France) JSB Compétition	(France) Julien Briché
7	14	(Italy) Autodromo Nazionale Monza	12–13 October		(France) Julien Briché	(United Kingdom) Josh Files	(Luxembourg) Autodis Racing by Target Competition	(United Kingdom) Josh Files

=== TCR Europe standings ===
==== Drivers' standings ====
Scoring system

Position	**1st**	**2nd**	**3rd**	**4th**	**5th**	**6th**	**7th**	**8th**	**9th**	**10th**	**11th**	**12th**	**13th**	**14th**	**15th**
Qualifying	5	4	3	2	1	—N/a									
Race	40	35	30	27	24	21	18	15	13	11	9	7	5	3	1

Pos.	Driver	HUN (Hungary)		HOC (Germany)		SPA (Belgium)		RBR (Austria)		OSC (Germany)		BAR (Spain)		MNZ (Italy)		Pts.
1	(United Kingdom) Josh Files	2^{4}	8	**1**^{1}	8	Ret	14	1^{2}	2	3	3	21^{2}	5	3	1	352
2	(France) Julien Briché	DSQ	1	4	1	Ret	1	Ret	12	11	14	2^{3}	3	**1^{1}**	2	314
3	(Uruguay) Santiago Urrutia	Ret	**6**	6	5	2^{2}	24	Ret	7	15^{3}	5	3^{4}	17	4^{3}	6	234
4	(Sweden) Andreas Bäckman	10^{2}	14	5^{5}	4	13	3	12	9	**DSQ**^{1}	9	**1**^{1}	10	7	15	218
5	(France) Nelson Panciatici	3^{3}	5	12	Ret	16	Ret	4^{3}	4	10^{4}	8	5	6	10	Ret	205
6	(Belgium) Gilles Magnus	6^{5}	2	8^{2}	9	**1**^{1}	26†	17	Ret	Ret^{5}	10	Ret	2	6	20	202
7	(France) Aurélien Comte	7	Ret	7	2	4^{5}	5	Ret	10	Ret	13	19	15	2^{2}	7	197
8	(Slovakia) Maťo Homola	**1**^{1}	11	Ret	Ret	7	2	9	6	6	Ret	13	16	5	14	194
9	(Germany) Luca Engstler	18	12	2^{3}	7	9	7	5	1	Ret	7	Ret	11	Ret	12	192
10	(United Kingdom) Daniel Lloyd			Ret	13	11	11	3^{5}	16	1^{2}	Ret	8	1	Ret	3	183
11	(Belgium) Maxime Potty	Ret	9	3^{4}	6	3^{3}	23	8	8	9	20	14	14	20	9	161
12	(Netherlands) Tom Coronel			11	10	10	25	19	18	2	2	6	8	WD	WD	137
13	(Italy) Gianni Morbidelli	8	Ret	Ret	11	14	10	11	5	5	Ret	10	13	Ret	5	135
14	(France) Teddy Clairet	12	13	9	14	DNS	6	Ret	15	12	17	20	7	9^{5}	4	116
15	(Austria) Dominik Baumann									4	4	7	9	8	10	111
16	(Italy) Luca Filippi	11	Ret	Ret	12	15	8	**2**^{1}	21†	7	11	28†	25	Ret	11	99
17	(United Kingdom) Alex Morgan	15	Ret	20	DNS			10	3	Ret	1	26	12			89
18	(Serbia) Dušan Borković	4	4	14	Ret	12	Ret	6	DSQ							85
19	(Sweden) Jessica Bäckman	9	15	13	3	23	16	Ret	23†	Ret	6	16	27†	26	18	70
20	(France) Jimmy Clairet	14	27†	10	16	5	22	14	13	Ret	15	24^{5}	29†	17	8	63
21	(Hungary) Dániel Nagy	5	3	23	15	17	Ret	13	Ret							60
22	(United Kingdom) Jack Young											4	4			54
23	(Georgia (country)) Davit Kajaia	17	10	17	24	6	Ret	7^{4}	Ret	DSQ	22†					52
24	(United Kingdom) Ashley Sutton					19^{4}	4									29
25	(France) Natan Bihel	Ret	26†	16	26†	18	Ret	Ret	11	Ret	12	12	18	18	19	23
26	(Norway) Stian Paulsen			Ret	Ret	8	27†	Ret	22†					12	27	22
27	(Belgium) Stéphane Lémeret	27	7													18
28	(Finland) Olli Kangas	22	16	21	17	DNS	9	16	17	13	Ret	Ret	21	22	Ret	18
29	(Hungary) Tamás Tenke			25	25†	21	12	15	Ret	Ret	Ret	11	20	27	Ret	17
30	(Hungary) Zsolt Szabó									8	16	15	26†			16
31	(France) John Filippi	13	Ret	15	18	22	17	Ret	Ret	WD	WD	27†	Ret	11	17	15
32	(Portugal) Francisco Mora											9	19			13
33	(North Macedonia) Viktor Davidovski	24	24	19	22	24	18	Ret	14	17	18	22	Ret	15	13	9
34	(Slovakia) Martin Ryba	16	29†	22	Ret	26	13	Ret	19	14	19	18	22	21	Ret	8
35	(Russia) Klim Gavrilov					20	15							13^{4}	29	8
36	(Morocco) Sami Taoufik													14	22	2
37	(Australia) Josh Burdon													16	16	0
38	(Qatar) Abdulla Ali Al-Khelaifi	23	19	18	19	29†	Ret			16	Ret	Ret	Ret	24	21	0
39	(Serbia) Milovan Vesnić	20	17													0
40	(Estonia) Robin Vaks											17	23			0
41	(France) Stéphane Ventaja	26	18	Ret	20	27	20									0
42	(France) Gilles Colombani							18	20			Ret	Ret			0
43	(France) Sylvain Poussier									18	21					0
44	(France) Lilou Wadoux	19	28†	Ret	21	28†	DNS									0
45	(France) Marie Baus-Coppens	Ret	25	24	23	Ret	19					Ret	28†	26	25	0
46	(Brazil) Guilherme Salas													19	28	0
47	(Poland) Jakub Wyszomirski	25	20													0
48	(United Kingdom) Lewis Kent					25	21									0
49	(Czech Republic) Petr Čížek	28	21													0
50	(Czech Republic) Jáchym Galáš	21	Ret													0
51	(Croatia) Žarko Knego	31†	22													0
52	(Russia) Grigoriy Burlutskiy													23	23	0
53	(Germany) Carol Wittke	29	23													0
54	(Estonia) Mattias Vahtel											23	Ret			0
55	(Poland) Albert Legutko													28	24	0
56	(Russia) Evgeny Leonov											Ret	24			0
57	(Portugal) Gustavo Moura											25	Ret			0
58	(Hong Kong) Paul Ip													29	26	0
59	(Poland) Maciej Łaszkiewicz	30	Ret													0
60	(Serbia) Rudolf Pešović	Ret	Ret													0
−	(Czech Republic) Dušan Kouřil	WD	WD													
Pos.	Driver	HUN (Hungary)		HOC (Germany)		SPA (Belgium)		RBR (Austria)		OSC (Germany)		BAR (Spain)		MNZ (Italy)		Pts.

Colour	Result
Gold	Winner
Silver	Second place
Bronze	Third place
Green	Points classification
Blue	Non-points classification
Blue	Non-classified finish (NC)
Purple	Retired, not classified (Ret)
Red	Did not qualify (DNQ)
Red	Did not pre-qualify (DNPQ)
Black	Disqualified (DSQ)
White	Did not start (DNS)
White	Withdrew (WD)
White	Race cancelled (C)
Blank	Did not practice (DNP)
Blank	Did not arrive (DNA)
Blank	Excluded (EX)

**Bold** – Pole
Italics – Fastest Lap

† – Drivers did not finish the race, but were classified as they completed over 75% of the race distance.

==== Teams' standings ====
Pos.	Team	HUN (Hungary)		HOC (Germany)		SPA (Belgium)		RBR (Austria)		OSC (Germany)		BAR (Spain)		MNZ (Italy)		Pts.
1	(Italy) Target Competition	**1**^{1}	4	**1**^{1}	3	7	2	1^{2}	2	**3**^{1}	3	**1**^{1}	5	3	1	792
1	(Italy) Target Competition	2^{2}	8	5^{5}	4	12	3	6	6	4	4	7^{2}	9	5	10	792
2	(Belgium) Team WRT	Ret	6	3^{4}	5	2^{2}	4	8	7	9	5	3^{4}	14	4^{3}	6	431
2	(Belgium) Team WRT	Ret	9	6	6	3^{3}	23	Ret	8	15^{3}	20	14	17	20	9	431
3	(France) JSB Compétition	19	1	4	1	28†	1	Ret	12	11	14	2^{3}	3	**1**^{1}	2	324
3	(France) JSB Compétition	Ret	25	24	21	Ret^{5}	19					Ret	28†	26	25	324
4	(Hungary) M1RA	5	3	2^{3}	7	9	7	5	1	8	7	15	11	Ret	12	293
4	(Hungary) M1RA	18	12	23	15	17	Ret	13	Ret	Ret	16	Ret	26†			293
5	(France) M Racing	3^{3}	5	12	26	16	Ret	4^{3}	4	10^{4}	8	5	6	10	Ret	247
5	(France) M Racing	Ret	26	16	Ret	18	Ret	Ret	11	Ret	12	12	18	18	19	247
6	(Belgium) Comtoyou Racing	6^{4}	2	8^{2}	9	**1**^{1}	26	17	Ret	Ret^{5}	10	Ret	2	6	20	220
6	(Belgium) Comtoyou Racing													14	22	220
7	(France) Team Clairet Sport	12	13	9	14	5^{5}	6	14	13	12	15	20	7	9^{5}	4	218
7	(France) Team Clairet Sport	14	18	10	16	27	20	18	15	Ret	17	24^{5}	29†	17	8	218
8	(Belgium) DG Sport Compétition	7	Ret	7	2	4	5	Ret	10	Ret	13	19	15	2^{2}	7	209
9	(Slovakia) Brutal Fish Racing Team	16	29	22	13	11	11	3^{5}	16	1^{2}	19	8	1	16	3	207
9	(Slovakia) Brutal Fish Racing Team			Ret	Ret	26	13	Ret	19	14	Ret	18	22	21	16	207
10	(Sweden) WestCoast Racing	8	16	21	11	14	9	11	5	5	Ret	10	13	22	5	175
10	(Sweden) WestCoast Racing	22	Ret	Ret	17	Ret	10	16	17	13	Ret	Ret	21	Ret	Ret	175
11	(Belgium) Boutsen Ginion Racing	27	7	11	10	10	25	19	18	2	2	6	8	WD	WD	157
12	(Italy) BRC Racing Team	11	Ret	Ret	12	15	8	**2**^{1}	21†	7	11	28†	25	Ret	11	125
13	(Switzerland) Wolf-Power Racing	15	Ret	20	DNS			10	3	Ret	1	26	12			99
14	(Switzerland) Vuković Motorsport	13	Ret	15	18	22	17	Ret	Ret	WD	WD	4	4	19	28	71
15	(Spain) PCR Sport	17	10	17	24	6	Ret	7^{4}	Ret	DSQ	22†	27†	Ret	11	17	70
16	(Norway) Stian Paulsen Racing			Ret	Ret	8	27	Ret	22					12	27	26
17	(Hungary) Zengő Motorsport			25	25†	21	12	15	Ret	Ret	Ret	11	20	27	Ret	21
18	(North Macedonia) PSS Racing Team	24	24	19	22	24	18	Ret	14	17	18	22	Ret	15	13	15
19	(Russia) VRC-Team					20	15							13^{4}	29	14
20	(Portugal) Veloso Motorsport											9	19			13
21	(Serbia) ASK Vesnić	20	17													5
21	(Serbia) ASK Vesnić	25	20													5
22	(Qatar) QMMF Racing by PCR Sport	23	19	18	19	29	Ret			16	Ret	Ret	Ret	24	21	2
23	(Estonia) ALM Honda Racing											17	23			1
23	(Estonia) ALM Honda Racing											23	Ret			1
24	(Czech Republic) Fullín Race Academy	28	21													0
24	(Czech Republic) Fullín Race Academy	29	23													0
25	(United Kingdom) Essex & Kent Motorsport					30	21									0
26	(Czech Republic) GT2 Motorsport	21	Ret													0
27	(Croatia) Auto Klub Dubrovnik Racing	31†	22													0
28	(Russia) Carville Racing													23	23	0
29	(Germany) Legutko Racing - ADAC Berlin													28	24	0
30	(Portugal) Team Novadriver											25	Ret			0
31	(Austria) RTM Motorsport	30	Ret													0
32	(Serbia) GM Racing	Ret	Ret													-
33	(Spain) Tecnicars Racing Team											Ret	24			-
-	(Czech Republic) K2 Engineering	WD	WD													-
Pos.	Driver	HUN (Hungary)		HOC (Germany)		SPA (Belgium)		RBR (Austria)		OSC (Germany)		BAR (Spain)		MNZ (Italy)		Pts.

Colour	Result
Gold	Winner
Silver	Second place
Bronze	Third place
Green	Points classification
Blue	Non-points classification
Blue	Non-classified finish (NC)
Purple	Retired, not classified (Ret)
Red	Did not qualify (DNQ)
Red	Did not pre-qualify (DNPQ)
Black	Disqualified (DSQ)
White	Did not start (DNS)
White	Withdrew (WD)
White	Race cancelled (C)
Blank	Did not practice (DNP)
Blank	Did not arrive (DNA)
Blank	Excluded (EX)

**Bold** – Pole
Italics – Fastest Lap

† – Drivers did not finish the race, but were classified as they completed over 75% of the race distance.

==== TCR BeNeLux Drivers' standings ====
Pos.	Driver	HUN (Hungary)		HOC (Germany)		SPA (Belgium)		BAR (Spain)		MNZ (Italy)		Pts.
1	(France) Julien Briché	DSQ^{4}	1	4	1	Ret	1	2^{2}	3	1^{1}	2	311
2	(United Kingdom) Josh Files	2^{2}	8	**1**^{1}	8	Ret	14	22^{1}	5	3^{5}	1	259
3	(Belgium) Gilles Magnus	6^{3}	2	8^{2}	9	**1**^{1}	26	Ret^{5}	2	6^{4}	20	240
4	(Uruguay) Santiago Urrutia	Ret	6	6^{5}	5	2^{2}	24	3^{3}	17	4^{3}	6	237
5	(France) Aurélien Comte	7	Ret	7^{4}	2	4^{5}	7	20	15	2^{2}	7	227
6	(Slovakia) Mat'o Homola	**1**^{1}	11	Ret	Ret	7	2	14	16	5	14	212
7	(Belgium) Maxime Potty	Ret	9	3^{3}	6	3^{3}	23	15	14	20	9	206
8	(Netherlands) Tom Coronel			11	10	10	25	6^{4}	8	WD	WD	129
9	(France) Marie Baus-Coppens	Ret	25	24	23	Ret	19	Ret	28†	26	25	105
10	(Serbia) Dušan Borković	4^{5}	4	14	Ret	12	Ret					92
11	(France) Lilou Wadoux	19	28	Ret	21	28	DNS					63
12	(United Kingdom) Ashley Sutton					19^{4}	4					47
13	(Belgium) Stéphane Lémeret	27	7									42
14	(Morocco) Sami Taoufik									14	22	36
Pos.	Driver	HUN (Hungary)		HOC (Germany)		SPA (Belgium)		BAR (Spain)		MNZ (Italy)		Pts.

Colour	Result
Gold	Winner
Silver	Second place
Bronze	Third place
Green	Points classification
Blue	Non-points classification
Blue	Non-classified finish (NC)
Purple	Retired, not classified (Ret)
Red	Did not qualify (DNQ)
Red	Did not pre-qualify (DNPQ)
Black	Disqualified (DSQ)
White	Did not start (DNS)
White	Withdrew (WD)
White	Race cancelled (C)
Blank	Did not practice (DNP)
Blank	Did not arrive (DNA)
Blank	Excluded (EX)

**Bold** – Pole
Italics – Fastest Lap

† – Drivers did not finish the race, but were classified as they completed over 75% of the race distance.

==== TCR BeNeLux Teams' standings ====
Pos.	Driver	HUN (Hungary)		HOC (Germany)		SPA (Belgium)		BAR (Spain)		MNZ (Italy)		Pts.
1	(France) JSB Compétition	19^{3}	1	4^{5}	1	28^{4}	1	2^{2}	3	1^{1}	2	314
2	(Luxembourg) Autodis Racing by Target Competition	**1**^{1}	4	**1**^{1}	8	7^{5}	2	14^{1}	5	3^{5}	1	288
3	(Belgium) Team WRT	Ret^{4}	6	3^{3}	5	2^{2}	4	3^{3}	14	4^{3}	6	262
4	(Belgium) Comtoyou Racing	6^{2}	2	8^{2}	9	**1**^{1}	26	Ret^{5}	2	6^{4}	20	261
5	(Belgium) DG Sport Compétition	7^{5}	Ret	7^{4}	2	4^{3}	5	20	15	2^{2}	7	244
6	(Belgium) Boutsen Ginion Racing	27	7	11	10	10	25	6^{4}	8	WD	WD	197
Pos.	Driver	HUN (Hungary)		HOC (Germany)		SPA (Belgium)		BAR (Spain)		MNZ (Italy)		Pts.

Colour	Result
Gold	Winner
Silver	Second place
Bronze	Third place
Green	Points classification
Blue	Non-points classification
Blue	Non-classified finish (NC)
Purple	Retired, not classified (Ret)
Red	Did not qualify (DNQ)
Red	Did not pre-qualify (DNPQ)
Black	Disqualified (DSQ)
White	Did not start (DNS)
White	Withdrew (WD)
White	Race cancelled (C)
Blank	Did not practice (DNP)
Blank	Did not arrive (DNA)
Blank	Excluded (EX)

**Bold** – Pole
Italics – Fastest Lap
