= 2025 Supercar Challenge =

Twenty-fifth season of the Supercar Challenge

The 2025 Supercar Challenge powered by Hankook was the twenty-fifth Supercar Challenge season since it replaced the Supercar Cup in 2001. It began at Circuit Zandvoort 5 April and ended at TT Circuit Assen on 26 October.

== Calendar ==
Round	Circuit	Date	Event	Map of circuit locations
1	Circuit Zandvoort, Netherlands	5–6 April	Spring Races	2025 Supercar Challenge is located in Benelux
2	(United Kingdom) Silverstone Circuit, England	2–3 May	BRSCC Silverstone 24 Hours	2025 Supercar Challenge is located in Benelux
3	Circuit de Spa-Francorchamps, Belgium	31 May–1 June	Spa Euro Races	2025 Supercar Challenge is located in Benelux
4	Circuit Zolder, Belgium	11–13 July	Supercar Madness	2025 Supercar Challenge is located in Benelux
5	TT Circuit Assen, Netherlands	8–10 August	JACK'S Racing Day	2025 Supercar Challenge is located in the United Kingdom
6	Circuit Zandvoort, Netherlands	27–28 September	Trophy of the Dunes	2025 Supercar Challenge is located in the United Kingdom
7	TT Circuit Assen, Netherlands	25–26 October	Supercar Madness Finale Races	2025 Supercar Challenge is located in the United Kingdom

== Entries ==
Icon	Class
GT	GT class
SS+	Supersport+ class
SS	Supersport class
SS2	Supersport 2 class
SP	Sport class

Team	Car	No.	Drivers	Class	Rounds
(Netherlands) BODA Racing	BMW M6 GT3	107	(Netherlands) Daan Meijer	GT	1, 3, 5–7
(Netherlands) Koopman Racing	BMW M6 GT3	149	(Netherlands) Cees Wijsman	GT	1, 3, 5–6
(Netherlands) Koopman Racing	BMW M6 GT3	150	(Netherlands) Ivar Moens	GT	3, 5
(Netherlands) Koopman Racing	BMW M6 GT3	151	(Netherlands) Wessel Sandkuijl	GT	6
(Netherlands) Koopman Racing	BMW Z4 GT3	103	(Netherlands) Hein Koopman	GT	1, 5–7
(Netherlands) Koopman Racing	BMW Z4 GT3	103	(Netherlands) Henk Thuis	GT	5
(Netherlands) Koopman Racing	BMW M4 GT3	105	(Netherlands) Mex Jansen	GT	5
(Netherlands) Koopman Racing	BMW M4 GT3	105	(Netherlands) Max Koebolt	GT	5
(Netherlands) Koopman Racing	BMW M4 GT4 Evo	235	(Netherlands) Patrick de Vreede	SS+	3–4, 6
(Netherlands) Koopman Racing	BMW M4 GT4 Evo	235	(Netherlands) Rogier de Leeuw	SS+	3–4, 6
(Netherlands) Koopman Racing	BMW M4 GT4	223	(Netherlands) Priscilla Speelman	SS	6–7
(Netherlands) Koopman Racing	BMW M4 GT4	223	(Netherlands) Martijn Wijsman	SS	6–7
(Netherlands) Koopman Racing	BMW M4 GT4	224	(Netherlands) Gilles van Houtum	SS	3
(Netherlands) Koopman Racing	BMW M4 GT4	224	(Netherlands) Martijn Wijsman	SS	3
(Netherlands) Koopman Racing	BMW M4 GT4	232	(Netherlands) Maik Broersen	SS	3, 5
(Netherlands) Koopman Racing	BMW M4 GT4	242	(Netherlands) Marlon Birdsall	SS	5–7
(Netherlands) Koopman Racing	BMW M4 GT4	242	(United Kingdom) Chris Birdle	SS	5
(Netherlands) Koopman Racing	BMW M2 CS	324	(Netherlands) Marlon Birdsall	SS2	3
(Netherlands) Koopman Racing	BMW M3 GTR	428	(Netherlands) Jos Harper	SP	1, 3, 5
(Netherlands) Koopman Racing	BMW M3 GTR	433	(Netherlands) Mikke Schutte	SP	5
(Netherlands) Koopman Racing	BMW M3 GTR	473	(Netherlands) Martijn Wijsman	SP	5
(Netherlands) Koopman Racing	BMW E46 M3	417	(Netherlands) Dio Poland	SP	3
(Netherlands) Koopman Racing	BMW E46 M3	424	(Netherlands) Gilles van Houtum	SP	6–7
(Netherlands) Koopman Racing	BMW E46 M3	453	(Netherlands) Han Wannet	SP	5
(Netherlands) Koopman Racing	BMW M240i	432	(Netherlands) Emile Drummen	SP	5
(Netherlands) Koopman Racing	BMW M240i	432	(Netherlands) Tom Drummen	SP	5
(Belgium) Speedlover	Porsche 992 GT3 Cup	117	(Belgium) Wim Meulders	GT	1–6
(Belgium) Speedlover	Porsche 992 GT3 Cup	117	(Belgium) Rik Renmans	GT	1–6
(Belgium) Speedlover	Porsche 992 GT3 Cup	118	(Belgium) John de Wilde	GT	2–3
(Belgium) NGT Racing	Porsche 992 GT3 Cup	115	(Belgium) Gilles Renmans	GT	3
(Denmark) Sally Racing	Honda NSX GT3	123	(Denmark) Dan Ringsted Jacobsen	GT	1, 7
(Denmark) Sally Racing	Cupra TCR	222	(Denmark) Nicolai Jonas	SS	1
(Denmark) Sally Racing	Cupra TCR	222	(Denmark) Marcus Terkildsen	SS	1
(Denmark) Sally Racing	Cupra TCR	221	(Denmark) Mikkel Obel	SS	1
(Denmark) Sally Racing	Cupra TCR	221	(Denmark) Peter Obel	SS	1
(United Kingdom) Mosler Motorsport	Mosler MT900R	104	(United Kingdom) Morgan Short	GT	2
(United Kingdom) Mosler Motorsport	Mosler MT900R	104	(United Kingdom) Marcus Short	GT	2
(Netherlands) JR Motorsport	BMW M3 F80	246	(Netherlands) Ruud Olij	SS+	1, 6
(Netherlands) JR Motorsport	BMW M3 F80	246	(Netherlands) Jeffrey Rademaker	SS+	6
(Netherlands) JR Motorsport	BMW E46	233	(Netherlands) Remco de Beus	SS	1–2, 5
(Netherlands) JR Motorsport	BMW E46	233	(Netherlands) Bas Schouten	SS	5
(Netherlands) JR Motorsport	BMW M6 GT3	108	(Netherlands) Ted van Vliet	GT	2, 5, 7
(Netherlands) Erol Ertan	Porsche 991 GT3 Cup	177	(Netherlands) Erol Ertan	GT	3
(Belgium) Q1 Racing	Porsche Cayman GT4 CS 2020	240	(Belgium) Mathias Beke	SS	3–4
(Belgium) Q1 Racing	Porsche Cayman GT4 CS 2020	240	(Belgium) Didier Rousseau	SS	3–4
(Belgium) Q1 Racing	Porsche 992 GT3 Cup	119	(Belgium) Jan Ooms	GT	4
(Netherlands) Dekker Racing	Porsche 992 GT3 Cup	106	(Netherlands) Marcel Dekker	GT	7
(Netherlands) Dekker Racing	Porsche 992 GT3 Cup	106	(Netherlands) Oscar Gräper	GT	7
(Netherlands) Blueberry Racing	BMW M4 GT4 Evo	273	(Netherlands) Berry van Elk	SS+	All
(Netherlands) De Vreede & de Leeuw	BMW M4 GT4 Evo	235	(Netherlands) Patrick de Vreede	SS+	1, 7
(Netherlands) De Vreede & de Leeuw	BMW M4 GT4 Evo	235	(Netherlands) Rogier de Leeuw	SS+	1, 7
(Netherlands) CP Motorsport	BMW M4 GT4 Evo	226	(Netherlands) Valentijn Greven	SS+	7
(Netherlands) CP Motorsport	BMW M4 GT4	282	(Netherlands) Semo Keric	SS+	5
(Netherlands) CP Motorsport	BMW M240i Daytec	320	(Belgium) Pieter Jan Lefevere	SS2	5
(Netherlands) CP Motorsport	BMW M2 CS	369	(Netherlands) Haso Keric	SS2	3
(Netherlands) CP Motorsport	BMW M2 CS	370	(Netherlands) Patrick Grootscholten	SS2	5, 7
(Netherlands) CP Motorsport	BMW M2 CS	380	(Netherlands) Daaf Steentjes	SS2	3, 7
(Netherlands) CP Motorsport	BMW M2	383	(Netherlands) Johan de Rouw	SS2	5
(Netherlands) CP Motorsport by DRDO	BMW M4 GT4	282	(Netherlands) Semo Keric	SS+	3
(Netherlands) CP Motorsport by DRDO	BMW M240i Daytec	320	(Belgium) Pieter Jan Lefevere	SS2	3
(Netherlands) CP Motorsport by DRDO	BMW M2 CS	369	(Netherlands) Haso Keric	SS2	3
(Netherlands) CP Motorsport by DRDO	BMW M2 CS	380	(Netherlands) Daaf Steentjes	SS2	3
(Netherlands) Bas Koeten Racing	BMW M4 GT4 Evo	226	(Netherlands) Valentijn Greven	SS+	3, 5
(Netherlands) Bas Koeten Racing	BMW M4 GT4 Evo	226	(Australia) Cameron Mcleod	SS+	3
(Netherlands) Bas Koeten Racing	BMW M4 GT4 Evo	226	(Netherlands) Maxime Oosten	SS+	5
(Netherlands) Bas Koeten Racing	BMW M4 GT4	227	(Netherlands) Henri Greven	SS	3, 5
(Netherlands) Bas Koeten Racing	BMW M4 GT4	227	(Netherlands) Marcel Schoonhoven	SS	3
(Netherlands) Bas Koeten Racing	BMW M4 GT4	227	(Netherlands) Max Tubben	SS	5
(Netherlands) Niemann Autosport	McLaren Artura Trophy	243	(Netherlands) Albert Jochems	SS+	5
(Netherlands) Niemann Autosport	McLaren Artura Trophy	243	(Netherlands) Charles Zwolsman	SS+	5
(Netherlands) Niemann Autosport	Cupra TCR	303	(Netherlands) Marcel Schoonhoven	SS2	5
(Netherlands) Niemann Autosport	Cupra TCR	303	(Netherlands) Stefan Barewijk	SS2	5
(Netherlands) DWS Racing by FMА	Cupra TCR	201	(Netherlands) Laurens de Wit	SS	All
(Netherlands) DWS Racing by FMА	Cupra TCR	201	(Netherlands) Fabian Schoonhoven	SS	All
(Netherlands) HBR	BMW 3.5 ST	234	(Netherlands) Robert van den Berg	SS	1, 3–4
(Netherlands) HBR	BMW 3.5 ST	234	(Netherlands) Sandra van der Sloot	SS	1, 3–4
(Netherlands) Febo Racing Team	Hyundai i30 N TCR	202	(Netherlands) Dennis de Borst	SS	1–6
(Netherlands) Febo Racing Team	Hyundai i30 N TCR	202	(Netherlands) Steff de Borst	SS	1–6
(Netherlands) Febo Racing Team	Hyundai Elantra N TCR	202	(Netherlands) Dennis de Borst	SS	7
(Netherlands) Febo Racing Team	Hyundai Elantra N TCR	202	(Netherlands) Steff de Borst	SS	7
(Netherlands) Ferry Monster Autosport	VW Golf GTI	207	(Netherlands) Pim van Riet	SS	1–3
(Netherlands) Ferry Monster Autosport	VW Golf GTI	207	(Netherlands) Lorenzo van Riet	SS	1–2, 4–7
(Netherlands) Ferry Monster Autosport	Cupra León Competición TCR	223	(Netherlands) Martin Huisman	SS	1
(Netherlands) Ferry Monster Autosport	Cupra León Competición TCR	223	(Netherlands) Teunis van der Grift	SS	1. 4–5
(Netherlands) Ferry Monster Autosport	Cupra León Competición TCR	223	(Netherlands) Priscilla Speelman	SS	4–5
(Netherlands) Ferry Monster Autosport	Cupra TCR	205	(Netherlands) Bert de Heus	SS	5
(Netherlands) Ferry Monster Autosport	Cupra TCR	205	(Netherlands) Jan Lammers	SS	5
(Netherlands) Cor Euser Racing	BMW M3 E46	245	(Netherlands) Cor Euser	SS	1
(Netherlands) Cor Euser Racing	Marcos LM600	100	(Netherlands) Cor Euser	GT	7
(Netherlands) MV Motorsport	BMW M2 CS	280	(Netherlands) Dick van Elk	SS	2
(Netherlands) MV Motorsport	BMW M2 CS	280	(Netherlands) Laurens de Wit	SS	2
(Netherlands) MV Motorsport	BMW M2 CS	328	(Netherlands) Mees Houben	SS2	3
(United Kingdom) Intersport Racing	Porsche 997 Cup	236	(United Kingdom) Kevin Clarke	SS	3
(Belgium) AOM Motorsport	Mitjet V6	214	(Luxembourg) Alain Berg	SS	3, 5–6
(Belgium) AOM Motorsport	Mitjet V6	214	(Belgium) Patrick Engelen	SS	3, 6
(Belgium) Team VDB	Cupra TCR	225	(Netherlands) Yardy Hoogwerf	SS	3
(Belgium) Team VDB	Cupra TCR	225	(Belgium) Steven Teirlinck	SS	3
(Netherlands) Certainty Racing	Audi RS 3 LMS TCR	244	(Netherlands) Dillon Koster	SS	3, 6
(Netherlands) Certainty Racing	Audi RS 3 LMS TCR	244	(Netherlands) Tim Schulte	SS	3, 6
(Netherlands) Just Racing	Ginetta GT4 Supercup	247	(Netherlands) Jeff Hagelen	SS	5
(Netherlands) Just Racing	Ginetta GT4 Supercup	247	(Netherlands) Sebas Walraven	SS	5
(Netherlands) Just Racing	BMW E46	415	(Netherlands) Bart Walraven	SP	5
(Netherlands) Just Racing	BMW 123D	416	(Netherlands) Feline Walraven	SP	5
(Netherlands) Racing Team Tappel	Zilhouette 3.5	211	(Netherlands) Henk Tappel	SS	1
(Netherlands) Racing Team Tappel	Zilhouette 3.5	211	(Netherlands) Harold Wisselink	SS	1, 3
(Netherlands) Racing Team Tappel	Zilhouette 3.5	344	(Netherlands) Henk Tappel	SS2	7
(Netherlands) Racing Team Tappel	Zilhouette 3.5	344	(Netherlands) Harold Wisselink	SS2	7
(Netherlands) Racing Team Tappel	Zilhouette Sport	444	(Netherlands) Henk Tappel	SP	5
(Netherlands) Racing Team Tappel	Zilhouette Sport	444	(Netherlands) Harold Wisselink	SP	5
(Netherlands) Motorsport Franken	BMW M240i Daytec	316	(Netherlands) Sam Franken	SS2	5
(Netherlands) Martinussen Motorsport	Porsche 964	390	(Belgium) Ken Martinussen	SS2	3, 5
(Netherlands) Martinussen Motorsport	Porsche 964	390	(Belgium) Erik Bruynoghe	SS2	3, 5
(Netherlands) DayVtec	BMW M240i Daytec	309	(Netherlands) Andre Seinen	SS2	5
(Netherlands) DayVtec	BMW M240i Daytec	317	(Netherlands) Nick van der Valk	SS2	5
(Netherlands) DayVtec	BMW M240i Daytec	343	(Netherlands) Bas Voermans	SS2	5
(Netherlands) Speedsports	Zilhouette Sport	461	(Netherlands) Mark Jobst	SP	1, 7
(Netherlands) Spirit Racing Team	Renault Clio Evo	401	(Netherlands) Rob Nieman	SP	1, 4, 6
(Netherlands) Spirit Racing Team	Renault Clio Evo	428	(Netherlands) Richard Meester	SP	1, 4, 6
(Netherlands) Spirit Racing Team	Renault Clio Evo	402	(Netherlands) Rob Nieman	SP	5
(Netherlands) Spirit Racing Team	Renault Clio Evo	402	(Netherlands) Richard Meester	SP	5
(Belgium) Traxx Racing	Renault Alpine	404	(Belgium) Chris Voet	SP	All
(Belgium) Traxx Racing	Renault Alpine	404	(Belgium) Bart van den Broeck	SP	1–6
(Netherlands) Supreme Motorsport	BMW MЗ Е46	403	(Netherlands) Maarten Baggermans	SP	1–7
(Netherlands) Supreme Motorsport	BMW MЗ Е46	403	(Netherlands) Naomi van Wagensveld	SP	1–2, 4
(Netherlands) Supreme Motorsport by DRDO	BMW 330 E46	481	(Netherlands) Naomi van Wagensveld	SP	3
(Ukraine) Protasov	BMW Compact	460	(Ukraine) Leonid Protasov	SP	2, 6
(Ukraine) Protasov	BMW Compact	460	(Ukraine) Sergii Pustovoitenko	SP	2, 6
(Netherlands) Certainty Racing by DRDO	BMW E46 M3	457	(Netherlands) Dennis van der Linde	SP	3
(Belgium) JJ Motorsport	BMW 330i	434	(Belgium) Tom Werckx	SP	3, 6
(Netherlands) PJ Motorsport	Zilhouette Sport	411	(Netherlands) Raymon Kuil	SP	4–5
(Netherlands) PJ Motorsport	Zilhouette Sport	411	(Netherlands) Mark Wieringa	SP	4–5
(Netherlands) PJ Motorsport	Zilhouette Sport	469	(Netherlands) Jan Berry Drenth	SP	4–5
(Netherlands) PJ Motorsport	Zilhouette Sport	469	(Netherlands) Martin West	SP	4
(Netherlands) PJ Motorsport	Zilhouette Sport	469	(Netherlands) Jacob Kuil	SP	5
(Netherlands) PJ Motorsport	Zilhouette Sport	498	(Netherlands) Pieter de Jong	SP	4–5
(Netherlands) PJ Motorsport	Zilhouette Sport	498	(Netherlands) Jack Hoekstra	SP	4–5
(Netherlands) PJ Motorsport	Zilhouette Sport	499	(Netherlands) Bernard Blaak	SP	4–5
(Netherlands) PJ Motorsport	Zilhouette Sport	499	(Netherlands) Lars Blaak	SP	4–5
(Germany) NFR Motorsports	BMW E46 М3	488	(Netherlands) Lars van 't Veer	SP	5
(Germany) NFR Motorsports	BMW E46 М3	488	(Netherlands) Luuk van Wijngaarden	SP	5

== Race results ==
Bold indicates overall winner.

Round		Circuit	GT Winning Car	Supersport+ Winning Car	Supersport Winning Car	Supersport 2 Winning Car	Sport Winning Car
Round		Circuit	GT Winning Drivers	Supersport+ Winning Drivers	Supersport Winning Drivers	Supersport 2 Winning Drivers	Sport Winning Drivers
1	R1	(Netherlands) Zandvoort	**(Netherlands) No. 107 BODA Racing**	(Netherlands) No. 246 JR Motorsport	(Netherlands) No. 201 DWS Racing by FMA		(Belgium) No. 404 Traxx Racing
1	R1	(Netherlands) Zandvoort	**(Netherlands) Daan Meijer**	(Netherlands) Ruud Olij	(Netherlands) Laurens de Wit		(Belgium) Bart van der Broeck
1	R2	(Netherlands) Zandvoort	**(Netherlands) No. 107 BODA Racing**	(Netherlands) No. 273 Blueberry Racing	(Netherlands) No. 223 Ferry Monster Autosport		(Belgium) No. 404 Traxx Racing
1	R2	(Netherlands) Zandvoort	**(Netherlands) Daan Meijer**	(Netherlands) Berry van Elk	(Netherlands) Martin Huisman		(Belgium) Chris Voet
1	R3	(Netherlands) Zandvoort	**(Netherlands) No. 107 BODA Racing**	(Netherlands) No. 235 De Vreede & de Leeuw	(Netherlands) No. 243 HBR		(Netherlands) No. 461 Speedsports
1	R3	(Netherlands) Zandvoort	**(Netherlands) Daan Meijer**	(Netherlands) Patrick de Vreede (Netherlands) Rogier de Leeuw	(Netherlands) Robert van den Berg (Netherlands) Sandra van der Sloot		(Netherlands) Mark Jobst
2	R1	(United Kingdom) Silverstone	(Belgium) **No. 118 Speedlover**	(Netherlands) No. 273 Blueberry Racing	(Netherlands) No. 202 Febo Racing Team		(Belgium) No. 404 Traxx Racing
2	R1	(United Kingdom) Silverstone	(Belgium) **John de Wilde**	(Netherlands) Berry van Elk	(Netherlands) Dennis de Borst; Steff de Borst		(Belgium) Chris Voet; Bart van der Broeck
3	R1	(Belgium) Spa-Francorchamps	(Belgium) **No. 118 Speedlover**	(Netherlands) No. 282 CP Motorsport by DRDO	(Netherlands) No. 201 DWS Racing by FMA	(Netherlands) No. 328 MV Motorsport	(Belgium) No. 404 Traxx Racing
3	R1	(Belgium) Spa-Francorchamps	(Belgium) **John de Wilde**	(Netherlands) Semo Keric	(Netherlands) Laurens de Wit (Netherlands) Fabian Schoonhoven	(Netherlands) Mees Houben	(Belgium) Chris Voet; Bart van der Broeck
3	R2	(Belgium) Spa-Francorchamps	(Netherlands) **No. 149 Koopman Racing**	(Netherlands) No. 226 Bas Koeten Racing	(Netherlands) No. 206 Ferry Monster Autosport	(Netherlands) No. 328 MV Motorsport	(Belgium) No. 404 Traxx Racing
3	R2	(Belgium) Spa-Francorchamps	(Netherlands) **Cees Wijsman**	(Netherlands) Valentijn Greven (Australia) Cameron Mcleod	(Netherlands) Pim van Riet	(Netherlands) Mees Houben	(Belgium) Chris Voet; Bart van der Broeck
4	R1	(Belgium) Zolder	(Belgium) **No. 119 Q1 Racing**	(Netherlands) No. 273 Blueberry Racing	(Netherlands) No. 206 Ferry Monster Autosport		(Netherlands) No. 498 PJ Motorsport
4	R1	(Belgium) Zolder	(Belgium) **Jan Ooms**	(Netherlands) Berry van Elk	(Netherlands) Lorenzo van Riet		(Netherlands) Pieter de Jong (Netherlands) Jack Hoekstra
4	R2	(Belgium) Zolder	(Belgium) **No. 119 Q1 Racing**	(Netherlands) No. 235 Ferry Monster Autosport	(Netherlands) No. 234 HBR		(Belgium) No. 404 Traxx Racing
4	R2	(Belgium) Zolder	(Belgium) **Jan Ooms**	(Netherlands) Patrick de Vreede (Netherlands) Rogier de Leeuw	(Netherlands) Robert van den Berg (Netherlands) Sandra van der Sloot		(Belgium) Chris Voet; Bart van der Broeck
5	R1	(Netherlands) Assen	(Netherlands) **No. 105 Koopman Racing**	(Netherlands) No. 432 Niemann Autosport	(Netherlands) No. 207 Ferry Monster Autosport	(Netherlands) No. 316 Motorsport Franken	(Netherlands) No. 498 PJ Motorsport
5	R1	(Netherlands) Assen	(Netherlands) **Mex Jansen** (Netherlands) **Max Koebolt**	(Netherlands) Albert Jochems (Netherlands) Charles Zwolsman	(Netherlands) Lorenzo van Riet	(Netherlands) Sam Franken	(Netherlands) Pieter de Jong (Netherlands) Jack Hoekstra
5	R2	(Netherlands) Assen	(Netherlands) **No. 105 Koopman Racing**	(Netherlands) No. 226 Bas Koeten Racing	(Netherlands) No. 227 Bas Koeten Racing	(Netherlands) No. 383 CP Motorsport	(Netherlands) No. 411 PJ Motorsport
5	R2	(Netherlands) Assen	(Netherlands) **Mex Jansen** (Netherlands) **Max Koebolt**	(Netherlands) Valentijn Greven (Netherlands) Maxime Oosten	(Netherlands) Henri Greven (Netherlands) Max Tubben	(Netherlands) Johan de Rouw	(Netherlands) Raymon Kuil (Netherlands) Mark Wieringa
6	R1	(Netherlands) Zandvoort	**(Netherlands) No. 107 BODA Racing**	(Netherlands) No. 273 Blueberry Racing	(Netherlands) No. 201 DWS Racing by FMA		(Netherlands) No. 403 Supreme Motorsport
6	R1	(Netherlands) Zandvoort	**(Netherlands) Daan Meijer**	(Netherlands) Berry van Elk	(Netherlands) Laurens de Wit		(Netherlands) Maarten Baggermans
6	R2	(Netherlands) Zandvoort	**(Netherlands) No. 107 BODA Racing**	(Netherlands) No. 273 Blueberry Racing	(Netherlands) No. 207 Ferry Monster Autosport		(Netherlands) No. 403 Supreme Motorsport
6	R2	(Netherlands) Zandvoort	**(Netherlands) Daan Meijer**	(Netherlands) Berry van Elk	(Netherlands) Lorenzo van Riet		(Netherlands) Maarten Baggermans
6	R3	(Netherlands) Zandvoort	**(Netherlands) No. 107 BODA Racing**	(Netherlands) No. 273 Blueberry Racing	(Netherlands) No. 207 Ferry Monster Autosport		(Netherlands) No. 403 Supreme Motorsport
6	R3	(Netherlands) Zandvoort	**(Netherlands) Daan Meijer**	(Netherlands) Berry van Elk	(Netherlands) Lorenzo van Riet		(Netherlands) Maarten Baggermans
7	R1	(Netherlands) Assen	(Netherlands) **No. 106 Dekker Racing**	(Netherlands) No. 226 CP Motorsport	(Netherlands) No. 201 DWS Racing by FMA	(Netherlands) No. 370 CP Motorsport	(Netherlands) No. 403 Supreme Motorsport
7	R1	(Netherlands) Assen	(Netherlands) **Marcel Dekker**	(Netherlands) Valentijn Greven	(Netherlands) Laurens de Wit	(Netherlands) Patrick Grootscholten	(Netherlands) Maarten Baggermans
7	R2	(Netherlands) Assen	**(Netherlands) No. 107 BODA Racing**	(Netherlands) No. 273 Blueberry Racing	(Netherlands) No. 207 Ferry Monster Autosport	(Netherlands) No. 344 Racing Team Tappel	(Netherlands) No. 424 Koopman Racing
7	R2	(Netherlands) Assen	**(Netherlands) Daan Meijer**	(Netherlands) Berry van Elk	(Netherlands) Lorenzo van Riet	(Netherlands) Harold Wisselink	(Netherlands) Maarten Baggermans
7	R3	(Netherlands) Assen	**(Netherlands) No. 107 BODA Racing**	(Netherlands) No. 273 Blueberry Racing	(Netherlands) No. 207 Ferry Monster Autosport	(Netherlands) No. 370 CP Motorsport	(Netherlands) No. 424 Koopman Racing
7	R3	(Netherlands) Assen	**(Netherlands) Daan Meijer**	(Netherlands) Berry van Elk	(Netherlands) Lorenzo van Riet	(Netherlands) Patrick Grootscholten	(Netherlands) Gilles van Houtum
Round		Circuit	GT Winning Car	Supersport+ Winning Car	Supersport Winning Car	Supersport 2 Winning Car	Sport Winning Car
Round		Circuit	GT Winning Drivers	Supersport+ Winning Drivers	Supersport Winning Drivers	Supersport 2 Winning Drivers	Sport Winning Drivers

=== Championship standings ===
Points were awarded to the top ten classified finishers in every race, except for the race at Silverstone, where all points were increased to 150%. During weekends with three races, the points for the first two races were cut in half.

Position	**1st**	**2nd**	**3rd**	**4th**	**5th**	**6th**	**7th**	**8th**	**9th**	**10th**	**Pole (R1)**
Points	24	22	20	18	16	14	12	10	8	6	1

Pos.	Driver	Team	(Netherlands) ZAN			(United Kingdom) SIL	(Belgium) SPA		(Belgium) ZOL		(Netherlands) ASS		(Netherlands) ZAN			(Netherlands) ASS			Points
GT
1	(Belgium) Wim Meulders (Belgium) Rik Renmans	(Belgium) Speedlover	3	4	4	4	4	4	2	2	5	4	3	4	3				217
2	(Netherlands) Cees Wijsman	(Netherlands) Koopman Racing	2	2	2		3	1			2	2	Ret	DNS	2				154
3	(Netherlands) Daan Meijer	(Netherlands) BODA Racing	1	1	1		DSQ (Note: Daan Meijer was disqualified after his car failed the post-race technical checks.)	DNS			Ret	DNS	**1**	1	1	2	1	1	145
4	(Netherlands) Hein Koopman	(Netherlands) Koopman Racing	**4**	3	3						3	3	4	3	Ret	3	3	3	139
5	(Belgium) John de Wilde	(Belgium) Speedlover				1	1	3											80
6	(Denmark) Dan Ringsted Jacobsen	(Denmark) Sally Racing	5	DNS	5											4	4	5	58
7	(Netherlands) Ted van Vliet	(Netherlands) JR Motorsport				3					Ret	Ret				5	Ret	4	56
8	(Netherlands) Ivar Moens	(Netherlands) Koopman Racing					5	5			4	Ret							50
9	(Belgium) Jan Ooms	(Belgium) Q1 Racing							**1**	1									49
10	(Netherlands) Mex Jansen (Netherlands) Max Koebolt	(Netherlands) Koopman Racing									**1**	1							49
11	(Netherlands) Marcel Dekker (Netherlands) Oscar Gräper	(Netherlands) Dekker Racing														**1**	2	2	46
12	(Belgium) Gilles Renmans	(Belgium) NGT Racing					2	2											44
13	(Netherlands) Henk Thuis	(Netherlands) Koopman Racing									3	3							40
14	(United Kingdom) Morgan Short (United Kingdom) Marcus Short	(United Kingdom) Mosler Motorsport				**2**													34
15	(Netherlands) Wessel Sandkuijl	(Netherlands) Koopman Racing											2	2	Ret				22
16	(Netherlands) Cor Euser	(Netherlands) Cor Euser Racing														Ret	Ret	Ret	0
Supersport+
1	(Netherlands) Berry van Elk	(Netherlands) Blueberry Racing	2	1	2	1 (Note: Berry van Elk finished first in his class but did not receive any points for the race.)	3	3	**1**	2	**3**	3	**1**	2	1	3	1	1	268
2	(Netherlands) Rogier de Leeuw (Netherlands) Patrick de Vreede	(Netherlands) De Vreede & de Leeuw (Note: Rogier de Leeuw and Patrick de Vreede only drove for De Vreede & De Leeuw in Rounds 1 and 7.) (Netherlands) Koopman Racing	3	3	1		4	4	2	1			2	3	2	**1**	3	2	213
3	(Netherlands) Valentijn Greven (Australia) Cameron McLeod (Note: Cameron McLeod only competed in Round 3 at Spa-Francorchamps.) (Netherlands) Maxime Oosten (Note: Maxime Oosten only competed in Round 5 at Assen.)	(Netherlands) Bas Koeten Racing (Netherlands) CP Motorsport (Note: Valentijn Greven switched to CP Motorsport for the final round of the season.)					2	1			4	1				1	2	3	131
4	(Netherlands) Semo Keric	(Netherlands) CP Motorsport (DRDO)					**1**	2			2	2							91
5	(Netherlands) Ruud Olij (Netherlands) Jeffrey Rademaker (Note: Jeffrey Rademaker only competed in Round 6 at Zandvoort.)	(Netherlands) JR Motorsport	**1**	2	3								3	2	3				85
6	(Netherlands) Albert Jochems (Netherlands) Charles Zwolsman	(Netherlands) Niemann Autosport									1	4							42
Supersport
1	(Netherlands) Steff de Borst (Netherlands) Dennis de Borst	(Netherlands) Febo Racing Team	5	2	3	1	2	2	2	3	4	4	6	5	5	**2**	3	3	270
2	(Netherlands) Laurens de Wit (Netherlands) Fabian Schoonhoven	(Netherlands) DWS Racing by FMА	**1**	9	2	**3**	1	3	**Ret**	2	**2**	2	1	Ret	2	1	2	2	261
3	(Netherlands) Lorenzo van Riet (Netherlands) Pim van Riet	(Netherlands) Ferry Monster Autosport	4	5	4	2	**10**	1	1	Ret	1	3	**2**	1	1	5	1	1	259
4	(Netherlands) Priscilla Speelman	(Netherlands) Ferry Monster Autosport (Netherlands) Koopman Racing (Note: Priscilla Speelman switched to Koopman Racing for the final 2 rounds of the season.)							3	4	7	9	4	3	6	4	4	5	125
5	(Netherlands) Marlon Birdsall (United Kingdom) Chris Birdle (Note: Chris Birdle only competed in Round 5 at Assen.)	(Netherlands) Koopman Racing									5	7	3	2	3	3	5	4	105
6	(Netherlands) Teunis van der Grift	(Netherlands) Ferry Monster Autosport	3	1	5				3	4	7	9							96
7	(Luxembourg) Alain Berg (Belgium) Patrick Engelen (Note: Patrick Engelen didn't compete during Round 5 at Assen.)	(Belgium) AOM Motorsport					4	5			3	6	DNS	4	4				95
8	(Netherlands) Robert van den Berg (Netherlands) Sandra van der Sloot	(Netherlands) HBR	2	3	1		DNS	4	Ret	1									87
9	(Netherlands) Martin Huisman	(Netherlands) Ferry Monster Autosport	3	1	5				3	4									76
10	(Netherlands) Martijn Wijsman	(Netherlands) Koopman Racing					Ret	9					4	3	6	4	4	5	75
11	(Netherlands) Remco de Beus (Netherlands) Bas Schouten (Note: Bas Schouten only competed in Round 5 at Assen.)	(Netherlands) JR Motorsport	Ret	4	6	4					9	5							74
12	(Belgium) Mathias Beke (Belgium) Didier Rousseau	(Belgium) Q1 Racing					8	10	4	5									50
13	(Netherlands) Dillon Koster (Netherlands) Tim Schulte	(Netherlands) Certainty Racing					Ret	7					5	6	7				39
14	(Netherlands) Henri Greven (Netherlands) Marcel Schoonhoven (Note: Marcel Schoonhoven only competed in Round 3 at Spa-Francorchamps.) (Netherlands) Max Tubben (Note: Max Tubben only competed in Round 5 at Assen.)	(Netherlands) Bas Koeten Racing					9	11			10	1							38
15	(Netherlands) Yardy Hoogwerf (Belgium) Steven Teirlinck	(Belgium) Team VDB					5	8											26
16	(Netherlands) Maik Broersen	(Netherlands) Koopman Racing					7	6			Ret	Ret							26
17	(Netherlands) Cor Euser	(Netherlands) Cor Euser Racing	6	6	7														26
18	(Netherlands) Dick van Elk	(Netherlands) MV Motorsport				5													24
19	(Denmark) Marcus Terkildsen (Denmark) Nicolai Jonas	(Denmark) Sally Racing	7	7	8														22
20	(United Kingdom) Kevin Clarke	(United Kingdom) Intersport Racing					3	Ret											20
21	(Netherlands) Jeff Hagelen (Netherlands) Sebas Walraven	(Netherlands) Just Racing									8	8							20
22	(Denmark) Mikkel Obel (Denmark) Peter Obel	(Denmark) Sally Racing	8	8	9														18
23	(Netherlands) Harold Wisselink (Netherlands) Henk Tappel (Note: Henk Tappel only competed in Round 3 at Spa-Francorchamps.)	(Netherlands) Racing Team Tappel	Ret	DNS	Ret		6	Ret											14
24	(Netherlands) Bert de Heus (Netherlands) Jan Lammers	(Netherlands) Ferry Monster Autosport									6	Ret							14
25	(Netherlands) Gilles van Houtum	(Netherlands) Koopman Racing					Ret	9											8
Supersport 2
1	(Netherlands) Haso Keric	(Netherlands) CP Motorsport					2	2			7	3							76
2	(Netherlands) Patrick Grootscholten	(Netherlands) CP Motorsport									5	7				**1**	2	1	76
3	(Netherlands) Daaf Steentjes	(Netherlands) CP Motorsport					DNS	4			6	DNS				2	Ret	2	65
4	(Belgium) Pieter Jan Lefevere	(Netherlands) CP Motorsport					3	3			8	6							64
5	(Netherlands) Mees Houben	(Netherlands) MV Motorsport					**1**	1											49
6	(Netherlands) Bas Voermans	(Netherlands) DayVtec									2	2							44
7	(Belgium) Ken Martinussen (Belgium) Erik Bruynoghe	(Netherlands) Martinussen Motorsport					5	6			9	Ret							38
8	(Netherlands) Andre Seinen	(Netherlands) DayVtec									4	4							36
9	(Netherlands) Marlon Bridsall	(Netherlands) Koopman Racing					4	5											34
10	(Netherlands) Nick van der Valk	(Netherlands) DayVtec									3	8							30
11	(Netherlands) Sam Franken	(Netherlands) Motorsport Franken									**1**	Ret							25
12	(Netherlands) Johan de Rouw	(Netherlands) CP Motorsport									Ret	1							24
13	(Netherlands) Marcel Schoonhoven (Netherlands) Stefan Barewijk	(Netherlands) Niemann Autosport									Ret	5							16
14	(Netherlands) Henk Tappel (Netherlands) Harold Wisselink	(Netherlands) Racing Team Tappel														Ret	7	Ret	12
Sport
1	(Belgium) Chris Voet (Belgium) Bart van den Broeck	(Belgium) Traxx Racing	1	1	3	**1**	1	1	3	1	11	2	3	3	3	2	3	3	276
2	(Netherlands) Maarten Baggermans (Netherlands) Naomi van Wagensveld	(Netherlands) Supreme Motorsport	3	4	4	2	**2**	2	5	5	9	5	**1**	1	1	**1**	2	4	262
3	(Netherlands) Rob Nieman	(Netherlands) Spirit Racing Team	2	Ret	2				2	3	4	4	6	Ret	1				130
4	(Netherlands) Gilles van Houtum	(Netherlands) Koopman Racing											2	2	2	3	1	1	90
5	(Netherlands) Pieter de Jong (Netherlands) Jack Hoekstra	(Netherlands) PJ Motorsport							**1**	6	**1**	3							84
6	(Netherlands) Richard Meester	(Netherlands) Spirit Racing Team	5	3	6				Ret	Ret	14	9	4	4	4				76
7	(Belgium) Tom Werckx	(Belgium) JJ Motorsport					4	4					5	5	5				68
8	(Netherlands) Mark Jobst	(Netherlands) Speedsports	**DNS**	DNS	1											4	4	2	65
9	(Netherlands) Mark Wieringa	(Netherlands) PJ Motorsport							4	Ret	3	1							62
10	(Ukraine) Leonid Protasov (Ukraine) Sergii Pustovoitenko	(Ukraine) Protasov				3							7	6	6				57
11	(Netherlands) Jan Berry Drenth	(Netherlands) PJ Motorsport							6	4	5	Ret							48
12	(Netherlands) Bernard Blaak (Netherlands) Lars Blaak	(Netherlands) PJ Motorsport							Ret	2	2	13							44
13	(Netherlands) Jacob Kuil	(Netherlands) PJ Motorsport									3	1							44
14	(Netherlands) Dennis van der Linde	(Netherlands) Certainty Racing by DRDO					3	3											40
15	(Netherlands) Jos Harper	(Netherlands) Koopman Racing	4	2	5		Ret	Ret			13	11							36
16	(Netherlands) Raymon Kuil	(Netherlands) PJ Motorsport							4	Ret	5	Ret							34
17	(Netherlands) Martin West	(Netherlands) PJ Motorsport							6	4									32
18	(Netherlands) Lars van 't Veer (Netherlands) Luuk van Wijngaarden	(Germany) NFR Motorsports									6	6							28
19	(Netherlands) Martijn Wijsman	(Netherlands) Koopman Racing									8	7							22
20	(Netherlands) Emile Drummen (Netherlands) Tom Drummen	(Netherlands) Koopman Racing									10	8							16
21	(Netherlands) Mikke Schutte	(Netherlands) Koopman Racing									7	Ret							12
22	(Netherlands) Han Wannet	(Netherlands) Koopman Racing									12	10							6
23	(Netherlands) Dio Poland	(Netherlands) Koopman Racing					Ret	5											0
24	(Netherlands) Bart Walraven	(Netherlands) Just Racing									15	12							0
25	(Netherlands) Henk Tappel	(Netherlands) Racing Team Tappel									Ret	DNS							0
