= Sports Car Championship Canada =

Sports car racing series

- Category: Grand touring Touring cars
- Country: Canada
- Inaugural season: 2021
- Tire suppliers: M Michelin
- Drivers' champion: GT4: (Canada) Jack Polito; TCR: (Canada) Richard Boake; TCA: (Canada) Eric Kunz
- Official website: Sports Car Championship Canada

Sports Car Championship Canada (SCCC), currently known as the Sports Car Championship Canada presented by Michelin for sponsorship reasons, is a Canadian professional sports car racing series organized by FEL Motorsports. Founded in 2021, the series was created as a competitor to the established Canadian Touring Car Championship series.

The fifth season was scheduled to run from May 16 to August 31, 2025. However, on April 18, 2025, the organizers announced that the season would be postponed due to insufficient entries.

== Format ==
Each season consists of twelve rounds. Starting in 2023, the series moved to a condensed four-event format, with 30- and 40- minute sprint races held at each event.

== Classes ==
There are three classes in the Sports Car Championship Canada series, featuring one grand tourer and two touring car classes:

- GT4
- TCR
- TCA

The inaugural season only featured the GT4 and TCR classes, though the organizers did not own the TCR license for Canada at the time. FEL Motorsports obtained the Canadian organization license for TCR competitions from the World Sporting Consulting (WSC) prior to the 2022 season.

In October 2022, FEL Motorsports announced the addition of the TCA class for the 2023 season.

== Circuits ==
Sports Car Championship Canada circuits map.

Course	Location	Years
Calabogie Motorsports Park	Calabogie, Ontario	2021–2022, 2024
Canadian Tire Motorsport Park	Bowmanville, Ontario	2021–2024
Circuit ICAR	Mirabel, Quebec	2021
Circuit Trois-Rivières	Trois-Rivières, Quebec	2022–2024
Toronto Street Circuit	Toronto, Ontario	2022–2024

== Champions ==
Season	GT4 Champion	Car	Team	TCR Champion	Car	Team	TCA Champion	Car	Team
2021	(Canada) Marco Signoretti	Ford Mustang GT4	Multimatic Motorsports	(Canada) Travis Hill	Audi RS 3 LMS TCR (2017)	TWOth Autosport			
2022	(Canada) Zachary Vanier	McLaren 570S GT4	Pfaff Motorsports	(Canada) Jerimy Daniel	Audi RS 3 LMS TCR (2017)	TRC Motorsport			
2023	(Canada) Jack Polito	Ford Mustang GT4	Polito Racing	(Canada) Dean Baker	Audi RS 3 LMS TCR (2021)	Baker Racing	(Canada) Trevor Hill	Honda Civic Si (FE1)	TWOth Autosport
2024	(Canada) Jack Polito	Ford Mustang GT4 (2024)	Polito Racing	(Canada) Richard Boake	Audi RS 3 LMS TCR (2021)	Blanchet Motorsports	(Canada) Eric Kunz	Honda Civic Si TCA	Eric Kunz Racing

== See also ==
- Canadian Touring Car Championship
- IMSA SportsCar Championship
- Blancpain GT World Challenge America
