= Audi RS 3 LMS =

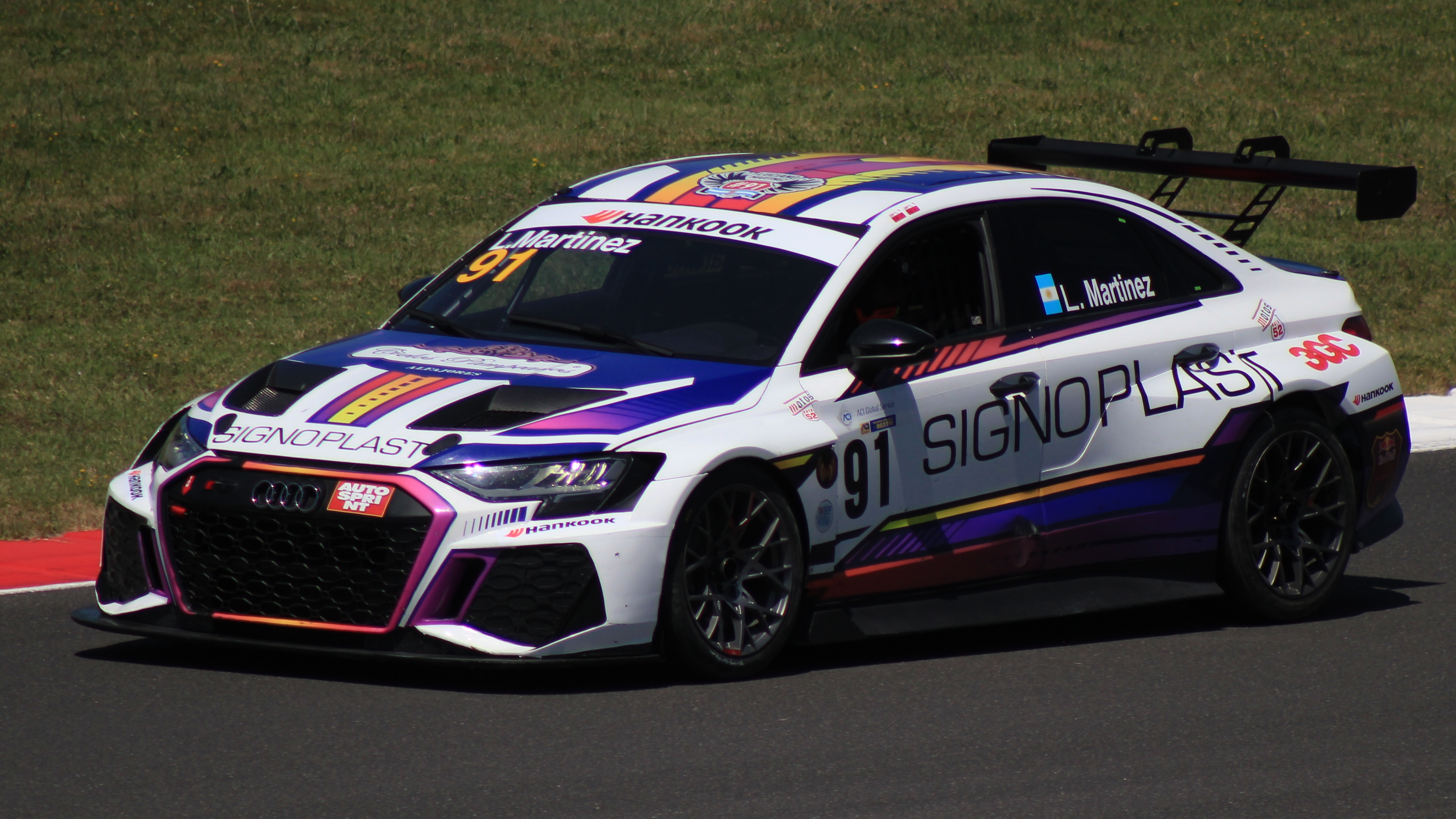
- Category: TCR Touring Car
- Constructor: Audi

Technical specifications
- Chassis: Audi RS 3
- Length: 4,599 mm (181.1 in)
- Width: 1,950 mm (76.8 in)
- Height: 1,340 mm (52.8 in)
- Wheelbase: 2,665 mm (104.9 in)
- Engine: Volkswagen EA888 1,984 cc (121.1 cu in) 330 hp (246 kW; 335 PS) I4 turbocharged front-mounted, FWD
- Transmission: Xtrac 6-speed Sequential
- Weight: 1,160–1,265 kg (2,557.4–2,788.8 lb)

Competition history
- Debut: 2017 TCR Middle East Series Dubai round

The Audi RS 3 LMS is a racing car developed by Audi Sport GmbH according to TCR regulations. Unveiled in 2016, it is based on the Audi RS 3 sedan. Although it is based on RS 3 sedan, the RS 3 LMS performs at high rates on the racetrack with its almost completely standard engine that came off the production line at the world famous site in Hungary. Since its debut in 2016, the Audi RS3 LMS has been one of the most successful race cars in the TCR championship, with 180 units built. It is also Audi's most popular customer race car model, accumulating more than 3,000 starts in more than 1,000 races since its introduction. The RS 3 LMS won the TCR Model of the Year in 2018, 2021, 2022, and 2023, which is an annual award given for the most successful TCR touring car in the category across a year.

== History ==
=== Typ 8V (2017) ===
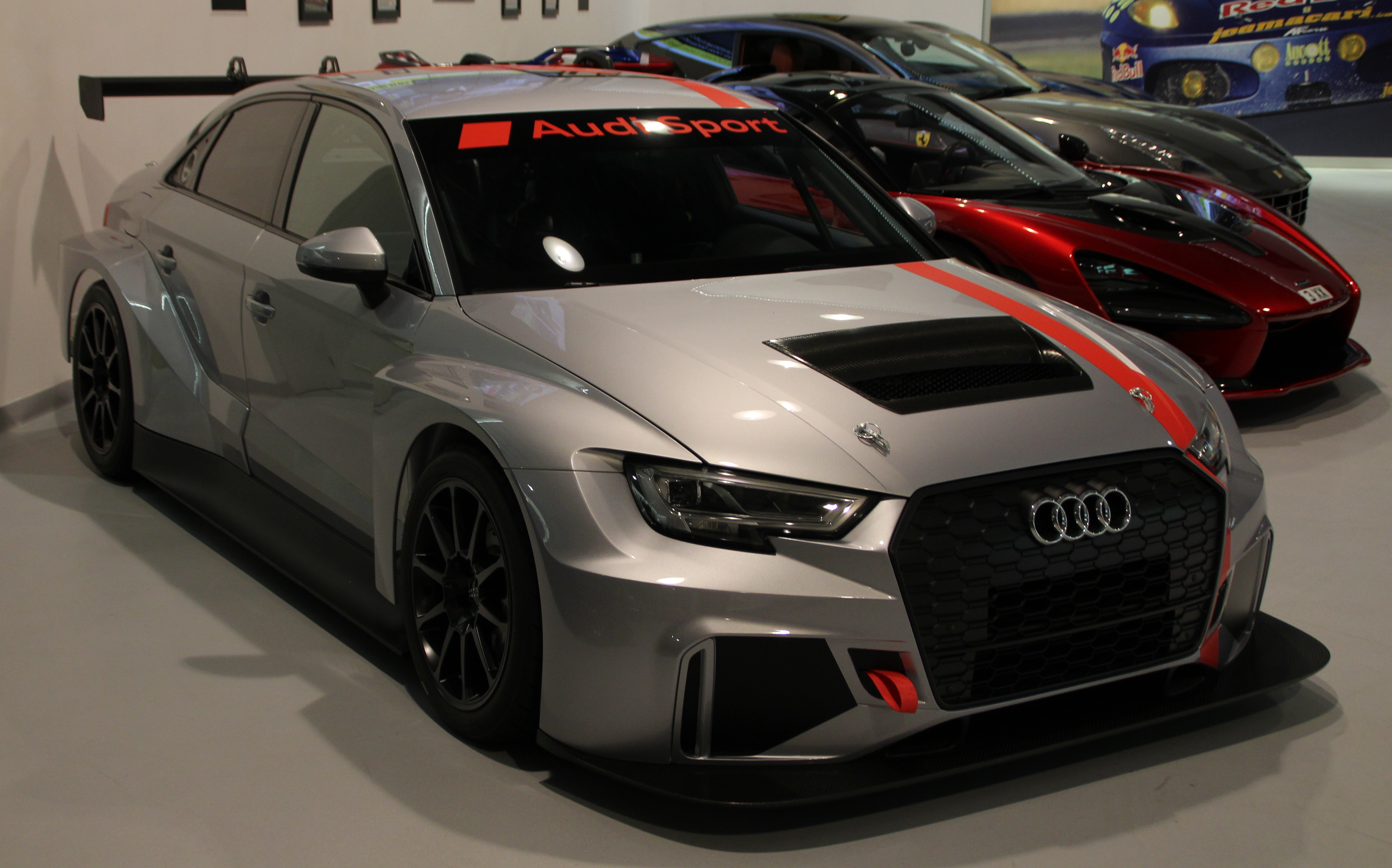
The first-generation RS 3 LMS.

To develop the LMS version, the RS 3 underwent significant widening, aero upgrades, and received safety upgrades. The engine is a 2.0-litre turbocharged inline-four engine. Audi typically sells the RS 3 LMS with a sequential transmission, though a DSG transmission is provided as an option for endurance races. The original RS 3 LMS was built on the third-generation Audi RS 3 and debuted in the 2017 TCR Middle East Series at the Dubai Autodrome. James Kaye won the 2017 Dubai 24 Hour that same weekend.

=== Typ 8Y (2021) ===
The RS 3 LMS received a full refresh in 2021 following the release of 4th generation Audi A3 the year prior. The new car's design served as a preview of the then-unreleased RS 3 sedan. It also received updates to its ergonomics, performance, and safety features. The refreshed RS 3 LMS made its debut in the 2021 World Touring Car Cup. Belgian racing team Comtoyou Racing managed Audi's factory efforts in the series.

== Championships ==
Year	Title	Driver
2017	Pirelli World Challenge - TC/TCA/TCB Class	(United States) Paul Holton
2017	TCR China Touring Car Championship	(China) Andy Yan
2017	TCR Russian Touring Car Championship	(Russia) Dmitry Bragin
2018	Continental Tire SportsCar Challenge - TCR Class	(United States) Britt Casey Jr. (United States) Tom Long
2018	TCR Russian Touring Car Championship	(Russia) Dmitry Bragin
2019	Super Taikyu Series - ST-TCR Class	(Japan) Takeshi Matsumoto (Japan) Takuro Shinohara
2019	TCR China Touring Car Championship	(China) Huang Chu Han
2019	TCR Eastern Europe Trophy	(Serbia) Milovan Vesnić
2020	Canadian Touring Car Championship - TCR Class	(Canada) Zachary Vanier
2020	TCR Europe Touring Car Series	(Morocco) Mehdi Bennani
2020	TCR Japan Saturday Series	(Japan) Takuro Shinohara
2020	TCR Japan Sunday Series	(Japan) Takuro Shinohara
2021	Sports Car Championship Canada - TCR Class	(Canada) Travis Hill
2021	TCR Australia Touring Car Series	(Australia) Chaz Mostert
2021	TCR Japan Saturday Series	(Japan) Keiichi Inoue
2022	Sports Car Championship Canada - TCR Class	(Canada) Jerimy Daniel
2022	TCR Eastern Europe Trophy	(Poland) Bartosz Groszek
2022	TCR Europe Touring Car Series	(Argentina) Franco Girolami
2023	Supercar Challenge - Supersport 1 Class	(Netherlands) Laurens de Wit
2023	Sports Car Championship Canada - TCR Class	(Canada) Dean Baker
2023	TCR Europe Touring Car Series	(Netherlands) Tom Coronel
2023	TCR Italy Touring Car Championship	(Argentina) Franco Girolami
2024	Michelin Pilot Challenge - TCR Class	(United States) Chris Miller (South Africa) Mikey Taylor
2024	Sports Car Championship Canada - TCR Class	(Canada) Richard Boake
2024	TCR Italy Touring Car Championship	(Canada) Nicolas Taylor
