= 2023 Sports Car Championship Canada =

Motorsports event

The 2023 Sports Car Championship Canada by Michelin was the third season of FEL Motorsports' Sports Car Championship Canada.

The season began at Canadian Tire Motorsport Park on May 19, and ended back at the same circuit on September 3.

== Schedule ==
The preliminary calendar was released on November 10, 2022, featuring 12 races across 4 weekends.

Round	Race	Length	Circuit	Location	Date
1	(Ontario) Victoria Day Speedfest	40 min	Canadian Tire Motorsport Park	Bowmanville, Ontario	May 19–21
2	(Ontario) Honda Indy Toronto	40 min	Toronto Street Circuit	Toronto, Ontario	July 14–16
3	(Quebec) Grand Prix de Trois-Rivières	40 min	Circuit Trois-Rivières	Trois-Rivières, Quebec	August 4–5
4	(Ontario) Labour Day Sprints	40 min	Canadian Tire Motorsport Park	Bowmanville, Ontario	September 1–3

- Calabogie Motorsports Park was dropped from the schedule due to a scheduling conflict with the Grand Prix de Trois-Rivières. The track was part of the championship since the inaugural season in 2021.

== Entry list ==
=== Grand Tourer (GT4) ===
Team	Chassis	No.	Drivers	Status	Rounds
(Canada) VPX Motorsport	Mercedes-AMG GT4	3	(Canada) Marc Lafleur		1–2
(Canada) VPX Motorsport	Mercedes-AMG GT4	3	(Canada) Vince Partap		3–4
(Canada) VPX Motorsport	Mercedes-AMG GT4	77	(United States) Nick Galante		2–3
(Canada) Bestline AutoTech	Porsche 718 Cayman GT4 RS Clubsport	19	(Canada) Stefano Lucente	G	2
(Canada) Polito Racing	Ford Mustang GT4	22	(Canada) Jack Polito		All
(Canada) JMF Motorsports	Mercedes-AMG GT4	34	(Canada) Demitria Chalkias		All

Icon	Status
G	Guest drivers ineligible to score points

=== Touring Car (TCR / TCA) ===
Team	Chassis	No.	Drivers	Status	Rounds
TCR
(Canada) Di Benedetto Racing	Audi RS 3 LMS TCR (2021)	4	(Canada) Justin Di Benedetto		All
(Canada) Martella Motorsports	Audi RS 3 LMS TCR (2017)	82	(Canada) Marco Cirone		1
(Canada) Martella Motorsports	Audi RS 3 LMS TCR (2021)	82	(Canada) Marco Cirone		2–3
(Canada) GT Racing	Volkswagen Golf GTI TCR	29	(Canada) Louis-Philippe Montour		1–3
(Canada) GT Racing	Volkswagen Golf GTI TCR	45	(Canada) Olivier Montour		All
(Canada) Bestline AutoTech	Audi RS 3 LMS TCR (2021)	37	(United States) Ed Killeen		All
(Canada) TWOth Autosport	Audi RS 3 LMS TCR (2017)	26	(Canada) Khalid Eidoo	G	4
(Canada) TWOth Autosport	Audi RS 3 LMS TCR (2021)	48	(Canada) Ron Tomlinson		All
(Canada) Baker Racing	Audi RS 3 LMS TCR (2021)	52	(Canada) Dean Baker		All
(Canada) M&S Racing	Honda Civic Type R TCR (FK8)	55	(Canada) Tom Kwok		All
(Canada) M&S Racing	Audi RS 3 LMS TCR (2021)	66	(Canada) Gary Kwok		1
(Canada) M&S Racing	Honda Civic Type R TCR (FL5)	66	(Canada) Gary Kwok		2–4
Hyundai Racing Canada	Hyundai Elantra N TCR	80	(Canada) Connor Atrell		All
Hyundai Racing Canada	Hyundai Veloster N TCR	86	(Canada) Quinn Atrell		All
(Canada) Blanchet Motorsports	Audi RS 3 LMS TCR (2021)	84	(Canada) Richard Boake		All
(Canada) 89 Racing Team	Honda Civic Type R TCR (FK8)	89	(Canada) Jocelyn Hébert		1, 3
(United States) Bryan Herta Autosport with Curb Agajanian	Hyundai Elantra N TCR	98	(Canada) Mark Wilkins	G	2
TCA
(Canada) M&S Racing	Honda Civic Si TCA	8	(Canada) Jonathan Young		All
(Canada) TWOth Autosport	Honda Civic Si (FE1)	2	(Canada) Trevor Hill		All
(Canada) TWOth Autosport	Honda Civic Si (FE1)	38	(Canada) Megan Tomlinson		All
(Canada) Sanders Motorsports	Honda Civic Si TCA	25	(Canada) Erik Kunz		All
(Canada) FEL Motorsports	Hyundai Veloster N TCA	44	(Canada) James Vance	G	2
Hyundai Racing Canada	Hyundai Veloster N TCA	88	(Canada) Bob Atrell	G	2

Icon	Status
G	Guest drivers ineligible to score points

== Race results ==
Round		Circuit	GT4 Winners	TCR Winners	TCA Winners	Report
1	R1	(Ontario) Mosport	(Canada) #22 Polito Racing	(Canada) #4 Di Benedetto Racing	(Canada) #2 TWOth Autosport	
1	R1	(Ontario) Mosport	(Canada) Jack Polito	(Canada) Justin Di Benedetto	(Canada) Trevor Hill	
1	R2	(Ontario) Mosport	(Canada) #22 Polito Racing	(Canada) #52 Baker Racing	(Canada) #2 TWOth Autosport	
1	R2	(Ontario) Mosport	(Canada) Jack Polito	(Canada) Dean Baker	(Canada) Trevor Hill	
1	R3	(Ontario) Mosport	(Canada) #22 Polito Racing	(Canada) #52 Baker Racing	(Canada) #2 TWOth Autosport	
1	R3	(Ontario) Mosport	(Canada) Jack Polito	(Canada) Dean Baker	(Canada) Trevor Hill	
2	R1	(Ontario) Toronto	(Canada) #77 VPX Motorsport	(Canada) #84 Blanchet Motorsports	(Canada) #44 FEL Motorsports	
2	R1	(Ontario) Toronto	(United States) Nick Galante	(Canada) Richard Boake	(Canada) James Vance	
2	R2	(Ontario) Toronto	(Canada) #22 Polito Racing	(Canada) #84 Blanchet Motorsports	(Canada) #44 FEL Motorsports	
2	R2	(Ontario) Toronto	(Canada) Jack Polito	(Canada) Richard Boake	(Canada) James Vance	
2	R3	(Ontario) Toronto	(Canada) #77 VPX Motorsport	(Canada) #84 Blanchet Motorsports	(Canada) #44 FEL Motorsports	
2	R3	(Ontario) Toronto	(United States) Nick Galante	(Canada) Richard Boake	(Canada) James Vance	
3	R1	(Quebec) Trois-Rivières	(Canada) #22 Polito Racing	(Canada) #29 GT Racing	(Canada) #25 Sanders Motorsports	
3	R1	(Quebec) Trois-Rivières	(Canada) Jack Polito	(Canada) Louis-Philippe Montour	(Canada) Erik Kunz	
3	R2	(Quebec) Trois-Rivières	(Canada) #22 Polito Racing	(Canada) #4 Di Benedetto Racing	(Canada) #2 TWOth Autosport	
3	R2	(Quebec) Trois-Rivières	(Canada) Jack Polito	(Canada) Justin Di Benedetto	(Canada) Trevor Hill	
3	R3	(Quebec) Trois-Rivières	(Canada) #77 VPX Motorsport	(Canada) #4 Di Benedetto Racing	(Canada) #25 Sanders Motorsports	
3	R3	(Quebec) Trois-Rivières	(United States) Nick Galante	(Canada) Justin Di Benedetto	(Canada) Erik Kunz	
4	R1	(Ontario) Mosport	(Canada) #22 Polito Racing	(Canada) #84 Blanchet Motorsports	(Canada) #2 TWOth Autosport	
4	R1	(Ontario) Mosport	(Canada) Jack Polito	(Canada) Richard Boake	(Canada) Trevor Hill	
4	R2	(Ontario) Mosport	(Canada) #22 Polito Racing	(Canada) #52 Baker Racing	(Canada) #2 TWOth Autosport	
4	R2	(Ontario) Mosport	(Canada) Jack Polito	(Canada) Dean Baker	(Canada) Trevor Hill	
4	R3	(Ontario) Mosport	(Canada) #22 Polito Racing	(Canada) #52 Baker Racing	(Canada) #2 TWOth Autosport	
4	R3	(Ontario) Mosport	(Canada) Jack Polito	(Canada) Dean Baker	(Canada) Trevor Hill	

== Points standings ==
Scoring system

Championship points are awarded for the first ten positions in each race.

Position	**1st**	**2nd**	**3rd**	**4th**	**5th**	**6th**	**7th**	**8th**	**9th**	**10th**
Points	40	35	30	24	22	20	16	12	8	4

=== GT4 Drivers ===
Pos.	Driver	Team	MSP (Ontario)			TOR (Ontario)			CTR (Quebec)			MSP (Ontario)			Points
Pos.	Driver	Team	RD1	RD2	RD3	RD1	RD2	RD3	RD1	RD2	RD3	RD1	RD2	RD3	Points
1	(Canada) Jack Polito	(Canada) Polito Racing	**1**	1	1	2	1	2	1	1	2	**1**	1	1	465
2	(Canada) Demitria Chalkias	(Canada) JMF Motorsports	2	2	2	**4**	3	3	3	3	DNS	2	2	2	360
3	(Canada) Marc Lafleur	(Canada) VPX Motorsport	3	3	3	Ret	DNS	DNS							228
3	(Canada) Vince Partap	(Canada) VPX Motorsport							4	4	3	3	3	DNS	228
4	(United States) Nick Galante	(Canada) VPX Motorsport				1	2	1	**2**	2	1				225
Ineligible for driver points
	(Canada) Stefano Lucente	(Canada) Bestline AutoTech				3	Ret	DNS							
Pos.	Driver	Team	MSP (Ontario)			TOR (Ontario)			CTR (Quebec)			MSP (Ontario)			Points

Key
Colour	Result
Gold	Race winner
Silver	2nd place
Bronze	3rd place
Green	Points finish
Blue	Non-points finish
Blue	Non-classified finish (NC)
Purple	Did not finish (Ret)
Black	Disqualified (DSQ)
Black	Excluded (EX)
White	Did not start (DNS)
White	Race cancelled (C)
White	Withdrew (WD)
Blank	Did not participate

**Bold** – Pole
Italics – Fastest Lap

† – Drivers did not finish the race, but were classified as they completed over 75% of the race distance.

=== TCR Drivers ===
Pos.	Driver	Team	MSP (Ontario)			TOR (Ontario)			CTR (Quebec)			MSP (Ontario)			Points
Pos.	Driver	Team	RD1	RD2	RD3	RD1	RD2	RD3	RD1	RD2	RD3	RD1	RD2	RD3	Points
1	(Canada) Dean Baker	(Canada) Baker Racing	**3**	1	1	2	2	2	3	9	3	2	1	1	398
2	(Canada) Richard Boake	(Canada) Blanchet Motorsports	6	11	2	1	1	1	5	2	Ret	1	3	2	337
3	(Canada) Justin Di Benedetto	(Canada) Di Benedetto Racing	1	Ret	4	5	7	9	2	1	1	Ret	2	Ret	270
4	(Canada) Gary Kwok	(Canada) M&S Racing	4	9	6	6	6	Ret	**6**	3	2	5	6	DSQ	245
5	(Canada) Louis-Philippe Montour	(Canada) GT Racing	2	2	3	**Ret**	3	5	1	4	Ret				218
6	(Canada) Ron Tomlinson	(Canada) TWOth Autosport	Ret	3	Ret	7	8	6	4	10†	5	3	4	3	200
7	(Canada) Marco Cirone	(Canada) Martella Motorsports	5	8	7	3	4	3	7	5	Ret				172
8	(Canada) Tom Kwok	(Canada) M&S Racing	7	6	8	9	9	8	Ret	DNS	DNS	4	5	6†	154
9	(Canada) Quinn Atrell	Hyundai Racing Canada	Ret	5	5	Ret	11	7	Ret	6	DNS	9	7	7†	128
10	(Canada) Olivier Montour	(Canada) GT Racing	8	Ret	10	Ret	10	Ret	8	8	7	7	8	5	120
11	(United States) Ed Killeen	(Canada) Bestline Autotech	10	10	9	Ret	Ret	10	9	Ret	6	8	10	Ret	74
12	(Canada) Connor Atrell	Hyundai Racing Canada	9	4	Ret	8	Ret	DNS	10	Ret	DNS	6	Ret	DNS	72
13	(Canada) Jocelyn Hébert	(Canada) 89 Racing Team	Ret	7	Ret				Ret	7	4				56
Ineligible for driver points
	(Canada) Mark Wilkins	(United States) Bryan Herta Autosport with Curb Agajanian				4	5	4							
	(Canada) Khalid Eidoo	(United States) TWOth Autosport										10	9	4	
Pos.	Driver	Team	MSP (Ontario)			TOR (Ontario)			CTR (Quebec)			MSP (Ontario)			Points

Key
Colour	Result
Gold	Race winner
Silver	2nd place
Bronze	3rd place
Green	Points finish
Blue	Non-points finish
Blue	Non-classified finish (NC)
Purple	Did not finish (Ret)
Black	Disqualified (DSQ)
Black	Excluded (EX)
White	Did not start (DNS)
White	Race cancelled (C)
White	Withdrew (WD)
Blank	Did not participate

**Bold** – Pole
Italics – Fastest Lap

† – Drivers did not finish the race, but were classified as they completed over 75% of the race distance.

=== TCA Drivers ===
Pos.	Driver	Team	MSP (Ontario)			TOR (Ontario)			CTR (Quebec)			MSP (Ontario)			Points
Pos.	Driver	Team	RD1	RD2	RD3	RD1	RD2	RD3	RD1	RD2	RD3	RD1	RD2	RD3	Points
1	(Canada) Trevor Hill	(Canada) TWOth Autosport	**1**	1	1	**2**	2	3	**2**	1	3	1	1	1	455
2	(Canada) Erik Kunz	(Canada) Sanders Motorsports	3	3	4	4	3	2	1	2	1	3	2	3	404
3	(Canada) Jonathan Young	(Canada) M&S Racing	2	2	2	6	4	4	3	3	2	2	Ret	2	354
4	(Canada) Megan Tomlinson	(Canada) TWOth Autosport	4	4	3	5	5	5	4	4	4	4	3	4	306
Ineligible for driver points
	(Canada) Bob Atrell	Hyundai Racing Canada				3	Ret	6							
	(Canada) James Vance	(Canada) FEL Motorsports				1	1	1							
Pos.	Driver	Team	MSP (Ontario)			TOR (Ontario)			CTR (Quebec)			MSP (Ontario)			Points

Key
Colour	Result
Gold	Race winner
Silver	2nd place
Bronze	3rd place
Green	Points finish
Blue	Non-points finish
Blue	Non-classified finish (NC)
Purple	Did not finish (Ret)
Black	Disqualified (DSQ)
Black	Excluded (EX)
White	Did not start (DNS)
White	Race cancelled (C)
White	Withdrew (WD)
Blank	Did not participate

**Bold** – Pole
Italics – Fastest Lap

† – Drivers did not finish the race, but were classified as they completed over 75% of the race distance.
