= 2019 TCR Eastern Europe Trophy =

2019 European motorsport event

The 2019 TCR Eastern Europe Trophy (also called 2019 TCR Eastern Europe Trophy powered by ESET for sponsorship reasons) was the first season of the TCR Eastern Europe Trophy. The season began on 27 April at the Hungaroring and ended on 13 October at the Autodromo Nazionale Monza.

== Teams and drivers ==
Team	Car	No.	Drivers	Rounds
(Austria) RTM Motorsport	Volkswagen Golf GTI TCR	7	(Poland) Maciej Łaszkiewicz	1−4
(Austria) RTM Motorsport	Volkswagen Golf GTI TCR	7	(Austria) Rene Martinek	5
(Switzerland) Besagroup Vuković Motorsport	Renault Mégane R.S TCR	11	(Czech Republic) Tomáš Pekař	2
(Slovakia) Brutal Fish Racing Team	Honda Civic Type R TCR (FK8)	17	(Slovakia) Martin Ryba	1, 4, 6
(Hungary) Team Unicorse	Alfa Romeo Giulietta TCR	19	(Hungary) Roland Amrein	3−4
(Czech Republic) Fullín Race Academy	CUPRA León TCR	22	(Germany) Carol Wittke	1−5
(Czech Republic) Fullín Race Academy	CUPRA León TCR	76	(Czech Republic) Petr Čížek	1−5
(Hungary) Zengő Motorsport	CUPRA León TCR	23	(Hungary) Tamás Tenke	5
(Czech Republic) GT2 Motorsport	Volkswagen Golf GTI TCR	24	(Czech Republic) Jáchym Galáš	1−5
(Serbia) ASK Vesnić	CUPRA León TCR	31	(Serbia) Milovan Vesnić	1−5
(Serbia) ASK Vesnić	Honda Civic Type R TCR (FK2)	77	(Poland) Jakub Wyszomirski	1−5
(Serbia) AMSK GM Racing	Audi RS 3 LMS TCR	32	(Serbia) Rudolf Pešović	1−2
(Czech Republic) K2 Engineering	Hyundai i30 N TCR	59	(Czech Republic) Dušan Kouřil Jr.	2−5
(Croatia) Auto Klub Dubrovnik Racing	CUPRA León TCR	74	(Croatia) Žarko Knego	1−3
(Czech Republic) Horňák-Aditis	Audi RS 3 LMS TCR	468	(Czech Republic) Radim Adámek	2−5

== Calendar and results ==
The calendar was released on 12 December 2018, with four rounds being held in conjunction with TCR Europe Touring Car Series. After the series was incorporated into the ESET V4 Cup as a standalone class, an amended calendar was published on 19 March 2019 with four of the six race calendar now forming part of the ESET V4 Cup calendar.

Rnd.		Circuit	Date	Pole position	Fastest lap	Winning driver	Winning team	Supporting
1	1	Hungaroring, Budapest, Hungary	28 April	(Slovakia) Martin Ryba	(Slovakia) Martin Ryba	(Slovakia) Martin Ryba	(Slovakia) Brutal Fish Racing Team	World Touring Car Cup; TCR Europe Touring Car Series; TCR BeNeLux Touring Car Championship
1	2	Hungaroring, Budapest, Hungary	28 April		(Serbia) Milovan Vesnić	(Serbia) Milovan Vesnić	(Serbia) ASK Vesnić	World Touring Car Cup; TCR Europe Touring Car Series; TCR BeNeLux Touring Car Championship
2	3	Red Bull Ring, Spielberg, Austria	18–19 May	(Serbia) Milovan Vesnić	(Serbia) Milovan Vesnić	(Serbia) Milovan Vesnić	(Serbia) ASK Vesnić	ESET V4 Cup
2	4	Red Bull Ring, Spielberg, Austria	18–19 May		(Czech Republic) Jáchym Galáš	(Czech Republic) Tomáš Pekař	(Switzerland) Besagroup Vuković Motorsport	ESET V4 Cup
3	5	Automotodrom Grobnik, Rijeka, Croatia	27–28 July	(Czech Republic) Jáchym Galáš	(Czech Republic) Jáchym Galáš	(Czech Republic) Jáchym Galáš	(Czech Republic) GT2 Motorsport	ESET V4 Cup
3	6	Automotodrom Grobnik, Rijeka, Croatia	27–28 July		(Czech Republic) Dušan Kouřil Jn.	(Serbia) Milovan Vesnić	(Serbia) ASK Vesnić	ESET V4 Cup
4	7	Automotodróm Slovakia Ring, Orechová Potôň, Slovakia	24–25 August	(Serbia) Milovan Vesnić	(Serbia) Milovan Vesnić	(Serbia) Milovan Vesnić	(Serbia) ASK Vesnić	ESET V4 Cup
4	8	Automotodróm Slovakia Ring, Orechová Potôň, Slovakia	24–25 August		(Serbia) Milovan Vesnić	(Czech Republic) Dušan Kouřil Jr.	(Czech Republic) K2 Engineering	ESET V4 Cup
5	9	Automotodrom Brno, Brno, Czech Republic	7–8 September	(Czech Republic) Jáchym Galáš	(Czech Republic) Jáchym Galáš	(Czech Republic) Dušan Kouřil Jr.	(Czech Republic) K2 Engineering	ESET V4 Cup
5	10	Automotodrom Brno, Brno, Czech Republic	7–8 September		(Serbia) Milovan Vesnić	(Czech Republic) Jáchym Galáš	(Czech Republic) GT2 Motorsport	ESET V4 Cup
6	11	Autodromo Nazionale Monza, Monza, Italy	12–13 October	(Slovakia) Martin Ryba	(Slovakia) Martin Ryba	(Slovakia) Martin Ryba	(Slovakia) Brutal Fish Racing Team	International GT Open; TCR Europe Touring Car Series; TCR BeNeLux Touring Car Championship
6	12	Autodromo Nazionale Monza, Monza, Italy	12–13 October		(Slovakia) Martin Ryba	no finishers		International GT Open; TCR Europe Touring Car Series; TCR BeNeLux Touring Car Championship

=== Drivers' standings ===
Pos.	Driver	HUN (Hungary)		RBR (Austria)		GRO (Croatia)		SVK (Slovakia)		BRN (Czech Republic)		MNZ (Italy)		Pts.
Pos.	Driver	R1	R2	R1	R2	R1	R2	R1	R2	R1	R2	R1	R2	Pts.
1	(Serbia) Milovan Vesnić	20^{2}	17	**1**^{1}	9	10^{2}	1	**1**^{1}	2	2^{5}	3			191
2	(Czech Republic) Jáchym Galáš	21^{4}	Ret	2^{2}	10^{†}	**1**^{1}	2	2^{3}	3	**3**^{1}	1			169
3	(Czech Republic) Dušan Kouřil Jn.			DSQ^{4}	2	2	3	3^{4}	1	1^{2}	2			142
4	(Czech Republic) Petr Čížek	28^{5}	21	6	5	3^{4}	5	5^{2}	4	5^{3}	7			116
5	(Poland) Jakub Wyszomirski	25^{3}	20	3^{5}	4	9	9	4	5	4^{4}	4			113
6	(Germany) Carol Wittke	29	23	9	6	4^{3}	4	6	6	7	5			87
7	(Slovakia) Martin Ryba	**16**^{1}	29					Ret^{5}	10			**21**^{1}	Ret	70
8	(Croatia) Žarko Knego	31	22	8	8	5	6							42
9	(Poland) Maciej Łaszkiewicz	30	Ret	7	7	6^{5}	7	7	9					41
10	(Czech Republic) Tomáš Pekař			4^{3}	1									40
11	(Serbia) Rudi Pešović	Ret	Ret	5	3									25
12	(Czech Republic) Radim Adámek			10	DNS	7	8	9	8	8	8			25
13	(Austria) Rene Martinek									6	6			16
14	(Hungary) Roland Amrein					8	Ret	8	7					14
15	(Hungary) Tamás Tenke									9	9			4
Pos.	Driver	HUN (Hungary)		RBR (Austria)		GRO (Croatia)		SVK (Slovakia)		BRN (Czech Republic)		MNZ (Italy)		Pts.

Colour	Result
Gold	Winner
Silver	Second place
Bronze	Third place
Green	Points classification
Blue	Non-points classification
Blue	Non-classified finish (NC)
Purple	Retired, not classified (Ret)
Red	Did not qualify (DNQ)
Red	Did not pre-qualify (DNPQ)
Black	Disqualified (DSQ)
White	Did not start (DNS)
White	Withdrew (WD)
White	Race cancelled (C)
Blank	Did not practice (DNP)
Blank	Did not arrive (DNA)
Blank	Excluded (EX)

**Bold** – Pole

Italics – Fastest Lap

† – Drivers did not finish the race, but were classified as they completed over 75% of the race distance.

=== Teams' standings ===
Pos.	Team	HUN (Hungary)		RBR (Austria)		GRO (Croatia)		SVK (Slovakia)		BRN (Czech Republic)		MNZ (Italy)		Pts.
Pos.	Team	RD1	RD2	RD1	RD2	RD1	RD2	RD1	RD2	RD1	RD2	RD1	RD2	Pts.
1	(Serbia) ASK Vesnić	20^{2}	17	**1**^{1}	4	9^{2}	1	**1**^{1}	2	2^{5}	3			305
1	(Serbia) ASK Vesnić	25^{3}	20	3^{5}	9	10	9	4	5	4^{4}	4			305
2	(Czech Republic) Fullín Race Academy	28^{5}	21	6	5	3^{4}	4	5^{2}	4	5^{3}	5			203
2	(Czech Republic) Fullín Race Academy	29	23	9	6	4^{3}	5	6	6	7	7			203
3	(Czech Republic) GT2 Motorsport	21^{4}	Ret	2^{2}	10^{†}	**1**^{1}	2	2^{3}	3	**3**^{1}	1			169
4	(Czech Republic) K2 Engineering			DSQ^{4}	2	2	3	3^{4}	1	1^{2}	2			142
5	(Slovakia) Brutal Fish Racing Team	**16**^{1}	29					Ret^{5}	10			**21**^{1}	Ret	70
6	(Austria) RTM Motorsport	30	Ret	7	7	6^{5}	7	7	9	6	6			57
7	(Croatia) Auto Klub Dubrovnik Racing	31	22	8	8	5	6							42
8	(Switzerland) Besagroup Vuković Motorsport			4^{3}	1									40
9	(Serbia) AMSK GM Racing	Ret	Ret	5	3									25
10	(Czech Republic) Horňák-Aditis			10	DNS	7	8	9	8	8	8			25
11	(Hungary) Team Unicorse					8	Ret	8	7					25
12	(Hungary) Zengő Motorsport									9	9			4
Pos.	Team	HUN (Hungary)		RBR (Austria)		GRO (Croatia)		SVK (Slovakia)		BRN (Czech Republic)		MNZ (Italy)		Pts.

Colour	Result
Gold	Winner
Silver	Second place
Bronze	Third place
Green	Points classification
Blue	Non-points classification
Blue	Non-classified finish (NC)
Purple	Retired, not classified (Ret)
Red	Did not qualify (DNQ)
Red	Did not pre-qualify (DNPQ)
Black	Disqualified (DSQ)
White	Did not start (DNS)
White	Withdrew (WD)
White	Race cancelled (C)
Blank	Did not practice (DNP)
Blank	Did not arrive (DNA)
Blank	Excluded (EX)

**Bold** – Pole

Italics – Fastest Lap

† – Drivers did not finish the race, but were classified as they completed over 75% of the race distance.
