= 2024 Sports Car Championship Canada =

Motorsports event

The 2024 Sports Car Championship Canada by Michelin was the fourth season of FEL Motorsports' Sports Car Championship Canada.

The season began at Canadian Tire Motorsport Park on May 17, and ended back at the same circuit on September 1.

== Schedule ==
The preliminary calendar was released on December 4, 2023, featuring 10 races across 5 weekends.

| Round | Race | Length | Circuit | Location | Date |
|---|---|---|---|---|---|
| 1 | (Ontario) Victoria Day Speedfest | 40 min | Canadian Tire Motorsport Park | Bowmanville, Ontario | May 17–19 |
| 2 | (Ontario) Calabogie Spring Classic | 40 min | Calabogie Motorsports Park | Calabogie, Ontario | June 21–23 |
| 3 | (Ontario) Honda Indy Toronto | 40 min | Toronto Street Circuit | Toronto, Ontario | July 19–21 |
| 4 | (Quebec) Grand Prix de Trois-Rivières | 40 min | Circuit Trois-Rivières | Trois-Rivières, Quebec | August 9–11 |
| 5 | (Ontario) Labour Day Sprints | 40 min | Canadian Tire Motorsport Park | Bowmanville, Ontario | August 30–September 1 |

- After a 1-year hiatus, Calabogie Motorsports Park returned to the SCCC calendar.

== Entry list ==
=== Grand Tourer (GT4) ===
| Team | Chassis | No. | Drivers | Status | Rounds |
|---|---|---|---|---|---|
| (Canada) Di Benedetto Racing | Porsche 718 Cayman GT4 RS Clubsport | 4 | (Canada) Justin Di Benedetto | | 1–4 |
| (Canada) VPX Motorsport | Porsche 718 Cayman GT4 RS Clubsport | 77 | (Canada) Cayden Goodridge | | 1, 3, 5 |
| (Canada) VPX Motorsport | Mercedes-AMG GT4 | 10 | (United States) Jared Odrick | G | 3–4 |
| (Canada) VPX Motorsport | Mercedes-AMG GT4 | 37 | (United States) Ed Killen | G | 2 |
| (Canada) Polito Racing | Ford Mustang GT4 (2024) | 22 | (Canada) Jack Polito | | All |
| (Canada) Polito Racing | Ford Mustang GT4 (2024) | 32 | (United States) Charles Finelli | | 5 |
| (United States) Legacy Autosport | Aston Martin Vantage (2018) | 63 | (United States) Jacob Loomis | | 5 |
| (United States) Legacy Autosport | Aston Martin Vantage (2018) | 94 | (United States) Nate Aranda | | 5 |
| (Canada) CW Motorsports | BMW M4 | 72 | (Canada) Simon Charbonneau | | 5 |
| (Canada) CW Motorsports | BMW M4 | 73 | (Canada) Malcolm Strachan | | 5 |
| (Canada) MAN Motorsports | Maserati GranTurismo | 80 | (Canada) Benoit Couture | | 5 |
| (Canada) MAN Motorsports | Maserati GranTurismo | 81 | (Canada) Matthew Scannell | | 5 |

| Icon | Status |
|---|---|
| G | Guest drivers ineligible to score points |

=== Touring Car (TCR / TCA) ===
| Team | Chassis | No. | Drivers | Status | Rounds |
TCR
| (Canada) M&S Racing | Honda Civic Type R TCR (FL5) | 8 | (Canada) Jonathan Young | | 1–4 |
| (Canada) M&S Racing | Honda Civic Type R TCR (FL5) | 8 | (Estonia) Ruben Volt | | 5 |
| (Canada) M&S Racing | Honda Civic Type R TCR (FL5) | 66 | (Canada) Gary Kwok | | All |
| (Canada) M&S Racing | Honda Civic Type R TCR (FK8) | 55 | (Canada) Tom Kwok | G | 3–5 |
| (Canada) TWOth Autosport | Audi RS 3 LMS TCR (2021) | 38 | (Canada) Megan Tomlinson | | All |
| (Canada) TWOth Autosport | Audi RS 3 LMS TCR (2021) | 48 | (Canada) Ron Tomlinson | | All |
| (Canada) Baker Racing | Audi RS 3 LMS TCR (2021) | 52 | (Canada) Dean Baker | C | 1 |
| Hyundai Racing Canada | Hyundai Elantra N TCR | 80 | (Canada) Connor Atrell | | 1–3, 5 |
| Hyundai Racing Canada | Hyundai i30 N TCR | 86 | (Canada) Quinn Atrell | | 1–3, 5 |
| (Canada) Blanchet Motorsports | Audi RS 3 LMS TCR (2021) | 84 | (Canada) Richard Boake | | All |
| (Canada) 89 Racing Team | Honda Civic Type R TCR (FK8) | 89 | (Canada) Jocelyn Hébert | G | 4 |
| (Canada) Martella Motorsports | Audi RS 3 LMS TCR (2021) | 95 | (Canada) Anthony Martella | | All |
TCA
| (Canada) Sanders Motorsports | Subaru BRZ TCA | 5 | (United States) Robert Cipriani-Detres | | All |
| (Canada) Sanders Motorsports | Subaru BRZ TCA | 12 | (Canada) Peter Hanson | | All |
| (Canada) M&S Racing | Honda Civic Si TCA (FE1) | 11 | (Canada) Felix Kwok | G | 4–5 |
| (Canada) Eric Kunz Racing | Honda Civic Si TCA | 25 | (Canada) Eric Kunz | | All |
| (Canada) MD Autosport | Hyundai Veloster N TCA | 26 | (Canada) Khloe Drummond | | 1–3 |
| (Canada) MD Autosport | Hyundai Veloster N TCA | 26 | (Canada) Megan Leahy | | 4–5 |

| Icon | Status |
|---|---|
| C | CTMP Cup entries ineligible to score points |
| G | Guest drivers ineligible to score points |

== Race results ==
| Round | | Circuit | GT4 Winners | TCR Winners | TCA Winners | Report |
|---|---|---|---|---|---|---|
| 1 | R1 | (Ontario) Mosport | (Canada) #22 Polito Racing | (Canada) #84 Blanchet Motorsports | (Canada) #25 Eric Kunz Racing | |
| 1 | R1 | (Ontario) Mosport | (Canada) Jack Polito | (Canada) Richard Boake | (Canada) Eric Kunz | |
| 1 | R2 | (Ontario) Mosport | (Canada) #22 Polito Racing | (Canada) #84 Blanchet Motorsports | (Canada) #25 Eric Kunz Racing | |
| 1 | R2 | (Ontario) Mosport | (Canada) Jack Polito | (Canada) Richard Boake | (Canada) Eric Kunz | |
| 2 | R1 | (Ontario) Calabogie | (Canada) #22 Polito Racing | (Canada) #66 M&S Racing | (Canada) #25 Eric Kunz Racing | |
| 2 | R1 | (Ontario) Calabogie | (Canada) Jack Polito | (Canada) Gary Kwok | (Canada) Eric Kunz | |
| 2 | R2 | (Ontario) Calabogie | (Canada) #22 Polito Racing | (Canada) #66 M&S Racing | (Canada) #25 Eric Kunz Racing | |
| 2 | R2 | (Ontario) Calabogie | (Canada) Jack Polito | (Canada) Gary Kwok | (Canada) Eric Kunz | |
| 3 | R1 | (Ontario) Toronto | (Canada) #22 Polito Racing | (Canada) #84 Blanchet Motorsports | (Canada) #25 Eric Kunz Racing | |
| 3 | R1 | (Ontario) Toronto | (Canada) Jack Polito | (Canada) Richard Boake | (Canada) Eric Kunz | |
| 3 | R2 | (Ontario) Toronto | (Canada) #22 Polito Racing | (Canada) #95 Martella Motorsports | (Canada) #5 Sanders Motorsports | |
| 3 | R2 | (Ontario) Toronto | (Canada) Jack Polito | (Canada) Anthony Martella | (United States) Robert Cipriani-Detres | |
| 4 | R1 | (Quebec) Trois-Rivières | (Canada) #4 Di Benedetto Racing | (Canada) #95 Martella Motorsports | (Canada) #5 Sanders Motorsports | |
| 4 | R1 | (Quebec) Trois-Rivières | (Canada) Justin Di Benedetto | (Canada) Anthony Martella | (United States) Robert Cipriani-Detres | |
| 4 | R2 | (Quebec) Trois-Rivières | (Canada) #22 Polito Racing | (Canada) #48 TWOth Autosport | (Canada) #25 Eric Kunz Racing | |
| 4 | R2 | (Quebec) Trois-Rivières | (Canada) Jack Polito | (Canada) Ron Tomlinson | (Canada) Eric Kunz | |
| 5 | R1 | (Ontario) Mosport | (Canada) #22 Polito Racing | (Canada) #84 Blanchet Motorsports | (Canada) #25 Eric Kunz Racing | |
| 5 | R1 | (Ontario) Mosport | (Canada) Jack Polito | (Canada) Richard Boake | (Canada) Eric Kunz | |
| 5 | R2 | (Ontario) Mosport | (Canada) #77 VPX Motorsport | (Canada) #95 Martella Motorsports | (Canada) #5 Sanders Motorsports | |
| 5 | R2 | (Ontario) Mosport | (Canada) Cayden Goodridge | (Canada) Anthony Martella | (United States) Robert Cipriani-Detres | |

== Points standings ==
Scoring system

Championship points are awarded for the first ten positions in each race.

| Position | **1st** | **2nd** | **3rd** | **4th** | **5th** | **6th** | **7th** | **8th** | **9th** | **10th** |
| Points | 40 | 35 | 30 | 24 | 22 | 20 | 16 | 12 | 8 | 4 |

=== Drivers' Championship ===
==== GT Drivers ====
| Pos. | Driver | Team | MSP (Ontario) | | CMP (Ontario) | | TOR (Ontario) | | CTR (Quebec) | | MSP (Ontario) | | Pts. |
| Pos. | Driver | Team | RD1 | RD2 | RD1 | RD2 | RD1 | RD2 | RD1 | RD2 | RD1 | RD2 | Pts. |
|---|---|---|---|---|---|---|---|---|---|---|---|---|---|
| 1 | (Canada) Jack Polito | (Canada) Polito Racing | **1** | 1 | 1 | 1 | **1** | 1 | Ret | 1 | **1** | 2† | 355 |
| 2 | (Canada) Cayden Goodridge | (Canada) VPX Motorsport | 3 | 2 | | | 2 | 3 | | | 2 | 1 | 210 |
| 3 | (Canada) Justin Di Benedetto | (Canada) Di Benedetto Racing | 2 | 3 | **2** | 2 | Ret | Ret | **1** | Ret | | | 175 |
| 4 | (United States) Jacob Loomis | (United States) Legacy Autosport | | | | | | | | | 3 | 4 | 54 |
| 5 | (Canada) Simon Charbonneau | (Canada) CW Motorsports | | | | | | | | | 5 | 5 | 44 |
| 6 | (United States) Nate Aranda | (United States) Legacy Autosport | | | | | | | | | Ret | 3 | 30 |
| 7 | (United States) Charles Finelli | (Canada) Polito Racing | | | | | | | | | 4 | DNS | 24 |
| 8 | (Canada) Benoit Couture | (Canada) MAN Motorsports | | | | | | | | | 6 | Ret | 20 |
| 9 | (Canada) Matthew Scannell | (Canada) MAN Motorsports | | | | | | | | | Ret | Wth | 0 |
| 10 | (Canada) Malcolm Strachan | (Canada) CW Motorsports | | | | | | | | | Ret | DNS | 0 |
Ineligible for driver points
| - | (United States) Jared Odrick | (Canada) VPX Motorsport | | | | | 3 | 2 | 2 | Ret | | | - |
| - | (United States) Ed Killen | (Canada) VPX Motorsport | | | 3 | 3 | | | | | | | - |
| Pos. | Driver | Team | MSP (Ontario) | | CMP (Ontario) | | TOR (Ontario) | | CTR (Quebec) | | MSP (Ontario) | | Pts. |

Key
| Colour | Result |
|---|---|
| Gold | Race winner |
| Silver | 2nd place |
| Bronze | 3rd place |
| Green | Points finish |
| Blue | Non-points finish |
| Blue | Non-classified finish (NC) |
| Purple | Did not finish (Ret) |
| Black | Disqualified (DSQ) |
| Black | Excluded (EX) |
| White | Did not start (DNS) |
| White | Race cancelled (C) |
| White | Withdrew (WD) |
| Blank | Did not participate |

**Bold** – Pole
Italics – Fastest Lap

† – Drivers did not finish the race, but were classified as they completed over 75% of the race distance.

==== TC Drivers ====
| Pos. | Driver | Team | MSP (Ontario) | | CMP (Ontario) | | TOR (Ontario) | | CTR (Quebec) | | MSP (Ontario) | | Pts. |
| Pos. | Driver | Team | RD1 | RD2 | RD1 | RD2 | RD1 | RD2 | RD1 | RD2 | RD1 | RD2 | Pts. |
TCR
| 1 | (Canada) Richard Boake | (Canada) Blanchet Motorsports | **1** | 1 | 5 | 3 | 1 | 2 | 8 | 5 | 1 | 2 | 332 |
| 2 | (Canada) Anthony Martella | (Canada) Martella Motorsports | 2 | 5 | **2** | DSQ | **2** | 1 | **1** | 6† | **2** | 1 | 308 |
| 3 | (Canada) Ron Tomlinson | (Canada) TWOth Autosport | 3 | 4 | 4 | 4 | 9 | 3 | 3 | 1 | 4 | 5 | 271 |
| 4 | (Canada) Gary Kwok | (Canada) M&S Racing | 4 | 6 | 1 | 1 | 3 | 6 | 2 | DNS | 5 | 4 | 265 |
| 5 | (Canada) Megan Tomlinson | (Canada) TWOth Autosport | 5 | 7 | 3 | 2 | 8 | 5 | 7 | Ret | 8 | Ret | 205 |
| 6 | (Canada) Quinn Atrell | Hyundai Racing Canada | 7† | 3 | 6 | 5 | 7 | 7 | | | 7 | 6 | 165 |
| 7 | (Canada) Jonathan Young | (Canada) M&S Racing | 6 | 8 | 7 | 6 | 4 | Ret | 4 | 2 | | | 161 |
| 8 | (Canada) Connor Atrell | Hyundai Racing Canada | 8† | 9† | 8 | Ret | 6 | 4 | | | 6 | 7 | 138 |
| 9 | (Estonia) Ruben Volt | (Canada) M&S Racing | | | | | | | | | 3 | 3 | 60 |
Ineligible for driver points
| - | (Canada) Jocelyn Hébert | (Canada) 89 Racing Team | | | | | | | 6 | 4 | | | - |
| - | (Canada) Tom Kwok | (Canada) M&S Racing | | | | | 5 | 8 | 5 | 3 | 9 | Ret | - |
| - | (Canada) Dean Baker | (Canada) Baker Racing | Ret | 2 | | | | | | | | | - |
TCA
| 1 | (Canada) Eric Kunz | (Canada) Eric Kunz Racing | **1** | 1 | **1** | 1 | **1** | 2 | 2 | 1 | 1 | Ret | 350 |
| 2 | (United States) Robert Cipriani-Detres | (Canada) Sanders Motorsport | 2 | 2 | 2 | 3 | 4 | 1 | **1** | 5† | **5** | 1 | 325 |
| 3 | (Canada) Peter Hanson | (Canada) Sanders Motorsport | 3 | 3 | 3 | 2 | 2 | 3 | 3 | 2 | 3 | 3 | 325 |
| 4 | (Canada) Khloe Drummond | (Canada) MD Autosport | 4 | 4 | 4 | 4 | 3 | 4 | | | | | 150 |
| 5 | (Canada) Megan Leahy | (Canada) MD Autosport | | | | | | | 4 | 4 | 4 | 4 | 114 |
Ineligible for driver points
| - | (Canada) Felix Kwok | (Canada) M&S Racing | | | | | | | Ret | 3 | 2 | 2 | - |
| Pos. | Driver | Team | MSP (Ontario) | | CMP (Ontario) | | TOR (Ontario) | | CTR (Quebec) | | MSP (Ontario) | | Pts. |

Key
| Colour | Result |
|---|---|
| Gold | Race winner |
| Silver | 2nd place |
| Bronze | 3rd place |
| Green | Points finish |
| Blue | Non-points finish |
| Blue | Non-classified finish (NC) |
| Purple | Did not finish (Ret) |
| Black | Disqualified (DSQ) |
| Black | Excluded (EX) |
| White | Did not start (DNS) |
| White | Race cancelled (C) |
| White | Withdrew (WD) |
| Blank | Did not participate |

**Bold** – Pole
Italics – Fastest Lap

† – Drivers did not finish the race, but were classified as they completed over 75% of the race distance.

=== CTMP Cup ===
==== GT Drivers ====
| Pos. | Driver | Team | MSP (Ontario) | | MSP (Ontario) | | Pts. |
| Pos. | Driver | Team | RD1 | RD2 | RD1 | RD2 | Pts. |
|---|---|---|---|---|---|---|---|
| 1 | (Canada) Jack Polito | (Canada) Polito Racing | **1** | 1 | **1** | 2† | 155 |
| 2 | (Canada) Cayden Goodridge | (Canada) VPX Motorsport | 3 | 2 | 2 | 1 | 140 |
| 3 | (Canada) Justin Di Benedetto | (Canada) Di Benedetto Racing | 2 | 3 | | | 65 |
| 4 | (United States) Jacob Loomis | (United States) Legacy Autosport | | | 3 | 4 | 54 |
| 5 | (Canada) Simon Charbonneau | (Canada) CW Motorsports | | | 5 | 5 | 44 |
| 6 | (United States) Nate Aranda | (United States) Legacy Autosport | | | Ret | 3 | 30 |
| 7 | (United States) Charles Finelli | (Canada) Polito Racing | | | 4 | DNS | 24 |
| 8 | (Canada) Benoit Couture | (Canada) MAN Motorsports | | | 6 | Ret | 20 |
| 9 | (Canada) Matthew Scannell | (Canada) MAN Motorsports | | | Ret | Wth | 0 |
| 10 | (Canada) Malcolm Strachan | (Canada) CW Motorsports | | | Ret | DNS | 0 |
| Pos. | Driver | Team | MSP (Ontario) | | MSP (Ontario) | | Pts. |

Key
| Colour | Result |
|---|---|
| Gold | Race winner |
| Silver | 2nd place |
| Bronze | 3rd place |
| Green | Points finish |
| Blue | Non-points finish |
| Blue | Non-classified finish (NC) |
| Purple | Did not finish (Ret) |
| Black | Disqualified (DSQ) |
| Black | Excluded (EX) |
| White | Did not start (DNS) |
| White | Race cancelled (C) |
| White | Withdrew (WD) |
| Blank | Did not participate |

**Bold** – Pole
Italics – Fastest Lap

† – Drivers did not finish the race, but were classified as they completed over 75% of the race distance.

==== TC Drivers ====
| Pos. | Driver | Team | MSP (Ontario) | | MSP (Ontario) | | Pts. |
| Pos. | Driver | Team | RD1 | RD2 | RD1 | RD2 | Pts. |
TCR
| 1 | (Canada) Richard Boake | (Canada) Blanchet Motorsports | **1** | 1 | 1 | 2 | 155 |
| 2 | (Canada) Anthony Martella | (Canada) Martella Motorsports | 2 | 5 | **2** | 1 | 132 |
| 3 | (Canada) Ron Tomlinson | (Canada) TWOth Autosport | 3 | 4 | 4 | 5 | 106 |
| 4 | (Canada) Gary Kwok | (Canada) M&S Racing | 4 | 6 | 5 | 4 | 90 |
| 5 | (Canada) Quinn Atrell | Hyundai Racing Canada | 7† | 3 | 7 | 6 | 87 |
| 6 | (Estonia) Ruben Volt | (Canada) M&S Racing | | | 3 | 3 | 60 |
| 7 | (Canada) Connor Atrell | Hyundai Racing Canada | 8† | 9† | 6 | 7 | 56 |
| 8 | (Canada) Megan Tomlinson | (Canada) TWOth Autosport | 5 | 7 | 8 | Ret | 50 |
| 9 | (Canada) Jonathan Young | (Canada) M&S Racing | 6 | 8 | | | 32 |
Ineligible for driver points
| - | (Canada) Jocelyn Hébert | (Canada) 89 Racing Team | | | | | - |
| - | (Canada) Tom Kwok | (Canada) M&S Racing | | | 9 | Ret | - |
| - | (Canada) Dean Baker | (Canada) Baker Racing | Ret | 2 | | | - |
TCA
| 1 | (United States) Robert Cipriani-Detres | (Canada) Sanders Motorsport | 2 | 2 | **5** | 1 | 132 |
| 2 | (Canada) Peter Hanson | (Canada) Sanders Motorsport | 3 | 3 | 3 | 3 | 130 |
| 3 | (Canada) Eric Kunz | (Canada) Eric Kunz Racing | **1** | 1 | 1 | Ret | 120 |
| 4 | (Canada) Megan Leahy | (Canada) MD Autosport | | | 4 | 4 | 48 |
| 5 | (Canada) Khloe Drummond | (Canada) MD Autosport | 4 | 4 | | | 48 |
Ineligible for driver points
| - | (Canada) Felix Kwok | (Canada) M&S Racing | | | 2 | 2 | - |
| Pts. | Driver | Team | MSP (Ontario) | | MSP (Ontario) | | Pts. |

Key
| Colour | Result |
|---|---|
| Gold | Race winner |
| Silver | 2nd place |
| Bronze | 3rd place |
| Green | Points finish |
| Blue | Non-points finish |
| Blue | Non-classified finish (NC) |
| Purple | Did not finish (Ret) |
| Black | Disqualified (DSQ) |
| Black | Excluded (EX) |
| White | Did not start (DNS) |
| White | Race cancelled (C) |
| White | Withdrew (WD) |
| Blank | Did not participate |

**Bold** – Pole
Italics – Fastest Lap

† – Drivers did not finish the race, but were classified as they completed over 75% of the race distance.
