= Milovan Vesnić =

Serbian racing driver

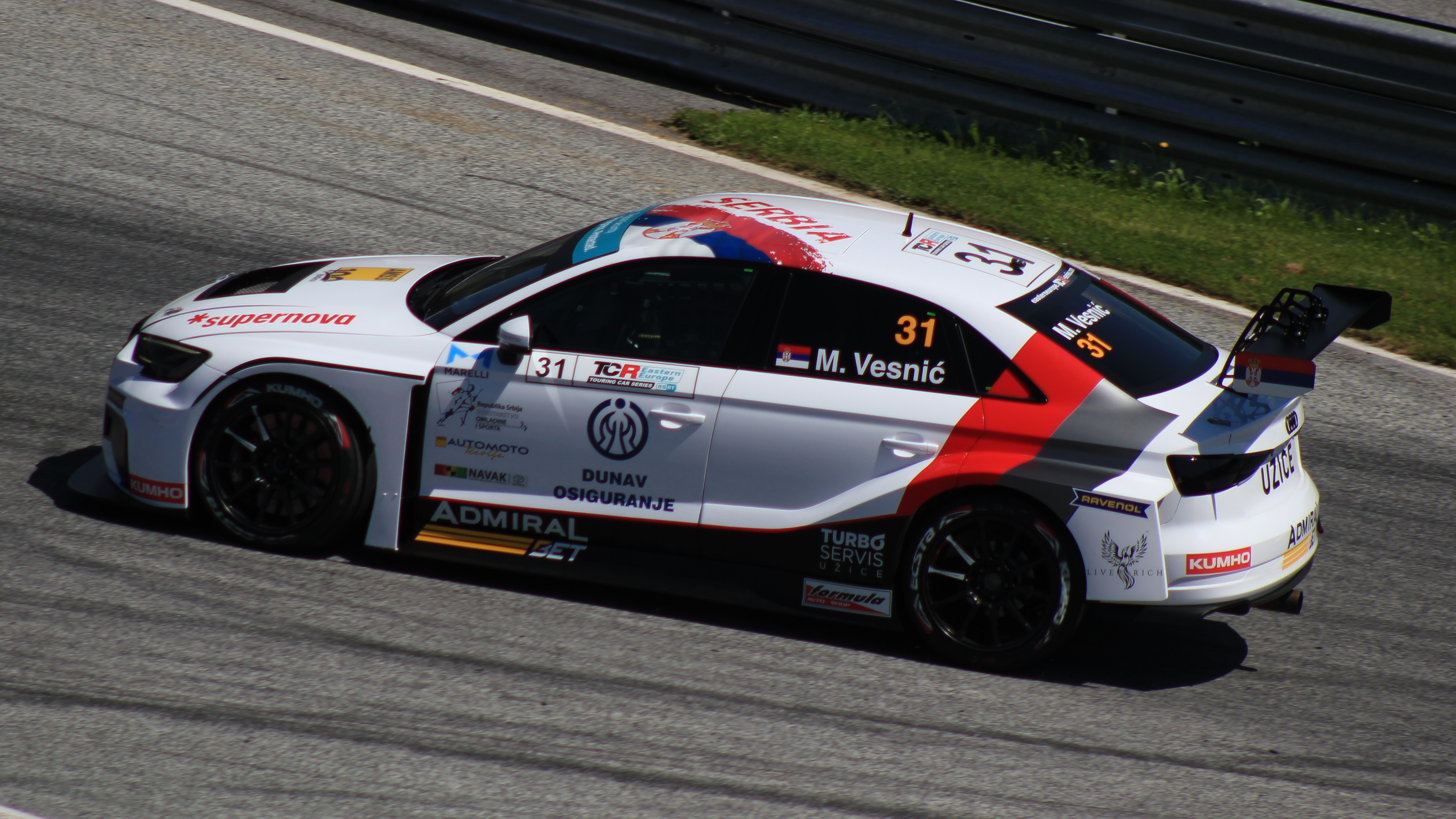
- Nationality: Serbian
- Born: 29 February 1976 (age 50) Užice, Serbia
- Relatives: Milun Vesnić (father)

TCR Eastern EuropeEuropean Touring Car Cup career
- Debut season: 2014
- Current team: ASK Sport Auto Vesnić
- Car number: 31
- Starts: 2
- Wins: 0
- Poles: 0
- Fastest laps: 0

Previous series
- 2013: FIA European central zone

Milovan Vesnić (born 29 February 1976) is a Serbian professional auto racing driver known for participating in European Touring Car Cup and TCR Eastern Europe events.

== Racing record ==
=== Complete European Touring Car Cup results ===
(key) (Races in bold indicate pole position) (Races in italics indicate fastest lap)

Year	Team	Car	1	2	3	4	5	6	7	8	9	10	DC	Pts
2014	ASK Sport Auto Vesnić	BMW 320si	LEC; 1; 15	LEC; 2 DNS	SVK; 1 Ret	SVK; 2 DNS	SAL; 1; 8	SAL; 2; 15	SPA; 1	SPA; 2	PER; 1	PER; 2	11th	7
