= List of motorsports points scoring systems =

This is a list of points scoring systems used to determine the outcome of the seasonal motorsports championships. Points are usually awarded depending on placement in the individual races. In addition, there may be bonus points for fastest training laps, fastest race laps, leading laps or other individual criteria. In some racing series, for example the ARCA Menards Series, full time entries get additional points after a predetermined number of races. Drivers who do not take part in the series full-time but only take part in certain races do not receive these special points. The following overview shows the different championship scoring systems.

== Limited race scoring systems (up to 20 points positions) ==
Table of point scoring systems for races which distribute points up to 20th place.

=== Shared scoring systems ===
Points scoring systems that were used by several championships or sanctioning bodies.

Year From	Year To	Championship	Comment	1st	2nd	3rd	4th	5th	6th	7th	8th	9th	10th	11th	12th	13th	14th	15th	16th	17th	18th	19th	20th
1953	1961	World Sportscar Championship	WSC class championship, Not all results counted towards total points scoring.	8	6	4	3	2	1	-	-	-	-	-	-	-	-	-	-	-	-	-	-
1960	1961	Formula One	Not all results counted towards total points scoring. Scoring system used only for constructors championship in 1961.	8	6	4	3	2	1	-	-	-	-	-	-	-	-	-	-	-	-	-	-
1961	1990	Formula One World Championship	Not all results counted towards total points scoring. Scoring system used only for drivers championship in 1961.	9	6	4	3	2	1	-	-	-	-	-	-	-	-	-	-	-	-	-	-
1962	1990	World Sportscar Championship	WSC class championship, not used between 1972 and 1989	9	6	4	3	2	1	-	-	-	-	-	-	-	-	-	-	-	-	-	-
1964	1990	Australian Drivers' Championship	Not used in 1988	9	6	4	3	2	1	-	-	-	-	-	-	-	-	-	-	-	-	-	-
1966	1968	Can-Am		9	6	4	3	2	1	-	-	-	-	-	-	-	-	-	-	-	-	-	-
1969	1993	Australian Touring Car Championship	ATC class championship, not used between 1983 and 1992	9	6	4	3	2	1	-	-	-	-	-	-	-	-	-	-	-	-	-	-
1970	1972	European Formula 5000 Championship	Basic scoring system, used for all races besides 1972 final round.	9	6	4	3	2	1	-	-	-	-	-	-	-	-	-	-	-	-	-	-
1971	1989	IMSA GT Championship	GT class championship	9	6	4	3	2	1	-	-	-	-	-	-	-	-	-	-	-	-	-	-
1976	1978	Rothmans International Series		9	6	4	3	2	1	-	-	-	-	-	-	-	-	-	-	-	-	-	-
1979	1982	British Formula One Championship	With 2 additional bonus points for pole and 1 bonus point for fastest race lap between 1978 and 1980 respectively with 1 additional bonus point for pole and fastest race lap in 1982	9	6	4	3	2	1	-	-	-	-	-	-	-	-	-	-	-	-	-	-
1988	1995	Japanese Formula 3000 Championship	Not all results counted towards total points scoring.	9	6	4	3	2	1	-	-	-	-	-	-	-	-	-	-	-	-	-	-
1988	2000	Japanese Formula 3 Championship	Not all results counted towards total points scoring.	9	6	4	3	2	1	-	-	-	-	-	-	-	-	-	-	-	-	-	-
1969	1987	Grand Prix motorcycle racing	Between 1969 and 1976 not all results counted towards total points scoring.	15	12	10	8	6	5	4	3	2	1	-	-	-	-	-	-	-	-	-	-
1989	2011	British Touring Car Championship	1 additional bonus point for pole position, fastest race lap and leading at least one lap	15	12	10	8	6	5	4	3	2	1	-	-	-	-	-	-	-	-	-	-
2000	2002	Swedish Touring Car Championship		15	12	10	8	6	5	4	3	2	1	-	-	-	-	-	-	-	-	-	-
2008	2008	Formula Nippon Championship	Scoring system for single race round	15	12	10	8	6	5	4	3	2	1	-	-	-	-	-	-	-	-	-	-
1969	1987	Can-Am	Not all results counted towards total points scoring.	20	15	12	10	8	6	4	3	2	1	-	-	-	-	-	-	-	-	-	-
1971	2004	German Formula Three Championship	Not used between 1988 and 1989 nor in 2002, additional 3 bonus points for pole position between 2003 and 2004	20	15	12	10	8	6	4	3	2	1	-	-	-	-	-	-	-	-	-	-
1972	1992	World Sportscar Championship	WSC class championship, 1988 only for 360 km races, in 1989 only for group C1 entries	20	15	12	10	8	6	4	3	2	1	-	-	-	-	-	-	-	-	-	-
1973	1978	Formula Libre; European F5000 Championship; British Formula One Championship	Basic scoring system, 2 additional bonus points for pole position between 1976 and 1978	20	15	12	10	8	6	4	3	2	1	-	-	-	-	-	-	-	-	-	-
1978	1986	Japanese Formula Two Championship	Not all results counted towards total points scoring.	20	15	12	10	8	6	4	3	2	1	-	-	-	-	-	-	-	-	-	-
1987	1987	Japanese Formula 3000 Championship		20	15	12	10	8	6	4	3	2	1	-	-	-	-	-	-	-	-	-	-
1987	1987	World Touring Car Championship		20	15	12	10	8	6	4	3	2	1	-	-	-	-	-	-	-	-	-	-
1987	1991	Australian Touring Car Championship	Not all results counted towards total points scoring.	20	15	12	10	8	6	4	3	2	1	-	-	-	-	-	-	-	-	-	-
1990	1996	IMSA GT Championship		20	15	12	10	8	6	4	3	2	1	-	-	-	-	-	-	-	-	-	-
1990	2000	Deutsche Tourenwagen Meisterschaft		20	15	12	10	8	6	4	3	2	1	-	-	-	-	-	-	-	-	-	-
1991	2014	Australian Drivers' Championship	Not all results counted towards total points scoring, not used between 1994 and 1995	20	15	12	10	8	6	4	3	2	1	-	-	-	-	-	-	-	-	-	-
1994	1994	Super Tourenwagen Cup		20	15	12	10	8	6	4	3	2	1	-	-	-	-	-	-	-	-	-	-
1996	1999	Swedish Touring Car Championship	Not all results counted towards total points scoring, 5 bonus points for qualifying	20	15	12	10	8	6	4	3	2	1	-	-	-	-	-	-	-	-	-	-
1998	2012	British Formula 3 International Series		20	15	12	10	8	6	4	3	2	1	-	-	-	-	-	-	-	-	-	-
2001	2008	Japanese Formula 3 Championship	1 additional bonus point for pole position and fastest race lap	20	15	12	10	8	6	4	3	2	1	-	-	-	-	-	-	-	-	-	-
2011	2017	Formula Masters China	1 additional bonus point for pole position, between 2012 and 2017 only for results in races #1 and 3 per round.	20	15	12	10	8	6	4	3	2	1	-	-	-	-	-	-	-	-	-	-
2019	2023	TC2000 Championship		20	15	12	10	8	6	4	3	2	1	-	-	-	-	-	-	-	-	-	-
1979	2011	Stock Car Pro Series	Points are awarded for each race at an event to the driver/s of a car that completed at least 75% of the race distance and was running at the completion of the race	25	20	16	14	12	10	9	8	7	6	5	4	3	2	1	-	-	-	-	-
2011	2013	Brasileiro de Marcas	Points are awarded for each race at an event to the driver/s of a car that completed at least 75% of the race distance and was running at the completion of the race	25	20	16	14	12	10	9	8	7	6	5	4	3	2	1	-	-	-	-	-
1981	1981	World Sportscar Championship	Scoring system for class points championship	20	19	18	17	16	15	14	13	12	11	10	9	8	7	6	5	4	3	2	1
1981	1982	Formula Pacific	Scoring system for scoring of individual races of a championship round	20	19	18	17	16	15	14	13	12	11	10	9	8	7	6	5	4	3	2	1
1995	1995	Super Tourenwagen Cup	Scoring system used for race 1 of a championship round	20	19	18	17	16	15	14	13	12	11	10	9	8	7	6	5	4	3	2	1
1981	2003	Championship Auto Racing Teams	1 additional bonus point for pole position and most led laps used only for events shorter than 200 miles between 1981 and 1982	20	16	14	12	10	8	6	5	4	3	2	1	-	-	-	-	-	-	-	-
1986	2001	American Racing Series / Indy Lights	1 additional bonus point for pole position and most led laps	20	16	14	12	10	8	6	5	4	3	2	1	-	-	-	-	-	-	-	-
1999	2002	Formula Atlantic	1 additional bonus point for pole position and most led laps	20	16	14	12	10	8	6	5	4	3	2	1	-	-	-	-	-	-	-	-
1984	1985	Deutsche Tourenwagen Meisterschaft		20	16	14	12	11	10	9	8	7	6	5	4	3	2	1	-	-	-	-	-
1984	2003	Formula Atlantic	Not used between 1998 and 2002, 1 additional bonus point for fastest driver of both qualifying sessions and for most laps led	20	16	14	12	11	10	9	8	7	6	5	4	3	2	1	-	-	-	-	-
1986	1989	Deutsche Tourenwagen Meisterschaft		20	18	16	15	14	13	12	11	10	9	8	7	6	5	4	3	2	1	-	-
1988	1989	German Formula Three Championship		20	18	16	15	14	13	12	11	10	9	8	7	6	5	4	3	2	1	-	-
1988	1991	Grand Prix motorcycle racing		20	17	15	13	11	10	9	8	7	6	5	4	3	2	1	-	-	-	-	-
2003	2004	Swedish Touring Car Championship		20	17	15	13	11	10	9	8	7	6	5	4	3	2	1	-	-	-	-	-
2012	2023	British Touring Car Championship	1 additional bonus point for pole position, fastest race lap and leading at least one lap	20	17	15	13	11	10	9	8	7	6	5	4	3	2	1	-	-	-	-	-
2018	2023	BRDC Formula 4 Championship	Scoring system used for race 2 of a championship round.	20	17	15	13	11	10	9	8	7	6	5	4	3	2	1	-	-	-	-	-
2021	2022	Scandinavian Touring Car Championship		20	17	15	13	11	10	9	8	7	6	5	4	3	2	1	-	-	-	-	-
1991	2002	Formula One World Championship		10	6	4	3	2	1	-	-	-	-	-	-	-	-	-	-	-	-	-	-
1995	2002	Deutscher Tourenwagen Cup		10	6	4	3	2	1	-	-	-	-	-	-	-	-	-	-	-	-	-	-
1996	2006	Formula Nippon Championship		10	6	4	3	2	1	-	-	-	-	-	-	-	-	-	-	-	-	-	-
2002	2002	Deutsche Tourenwagen Masters	Scoring system for main race	10	6	4	3	2	1	-	-	-	-	-	-	-	-	-	-	-	-	-	-
2002	2002	German Formula Three Championship	1 additional bonus point for pole position	10	6	4	3	2	1	-	-	-	-	-	-	-	-	-	-	-	-	-	-
1993	1996	Australian Touring Car Championship	Scoring system used in 1993 only for final round of championship and used between 1994 and 1996 for all rounds of the championship	20	16	14	12	10	8	6	4	2	1	-	-	-	-	-	-	-	-	-	-
1994	1995	Australian Drivers' Championship		20	16	14	12	10	8	6	4	2	1	-	-	-	-	-	-	-	-	-	-
1993	2023	Grand Prix motorcycle racing		25	20	16	13	11	10	9	8	7	6	5	4	3	2	1	-	-	-	-	-
2019	2022	World Touring Car Cup	Scoring system only for race #2 of a championship round in 2022	25	20	16	13	11	10	9	8	7	6	5	4	3	2	1	-	-	-	-	-
2019	2022	ADAC GT Masters		25	20	16	13	11	10	9	8	7	6	5	4	3	2	1	-	-	-	-	-
2020	2022	ADAC TCR Germany Touring Car Championship		25	20	16	13	11	10	9	8	7	6	5	4	3	2	1	-	-	-	-	-
2023	2023	Deutsche Tourenwagen Masters		25	20	16	13	11	10	9	8	7	6	5	4	3	2	1	-	-	-	-	-
2003	2009	Formula One World Championship		10	8	6	5	4	3	2	1	-	-	-	-	-	-	-	-	-	-	-	-
2003	2011	Deutsche Tourenwagen Masters		10	8	6	5	4	3	2	1	-	-	-	-	-	-	-	-	-	-	-	-
2003	2016	Deutscher Tourenwagen Cup		10	8	6	5	4	3	2	1	-	-	-	-	-	-	-	-	-	-	-	-
2004	2009	Le Mans Endurance Series	1 additional bonus point for pole position	10	8	6	5	4	3	2	1	-	-	-	-	-	-	-	-	-	-	-	-
2005	2009	World Touring Car Championship		10	8	6	5	4	3	2	1	-	-	-	-	-	-	-	-	-	-	-	-
2005	2011	GP2 Series		10	8	6	5	4	3	2	1	-	-	-	-	-	-	-	-	-	-	-	-
2005	2011	German Formula Three Championship	1 additional bonus point for pole position and fastest race lap	10	8	6	5	4	3	2	1	-	-	-	-	-	-	-	-	-	-	-	-
2005	2023	Formula Renault AsiaCup	Scoring system only for teams championship	10	8	6	5	4	3	2	1	-	-	-	-	-	-	-	-	-	-	-	-
2006	2009	Swedish Touring Car Championship		10	8	6	5	4	3	2	1	-	-	-	-	-	-	-	-	-	-	-	-
2007	2010	ADAC GT Masters		10	8	6	5	4	3	2	1	-	-	-	-	-	-	-	-	-	-	-	-
2007	2019	Formula Nippon Championship	Scoring system for standard race, 1 additional bonus point for pole position between 2007 and 2019	10	8	6	5	4	3	2	1	-	-	-	-	-	-	-	-	-	-	-	-
2021	2022	ADAC TCR Germany Touring Car Championship	Scoring system for qualy race	10	8	6	5	4	3	2	1	-	-	-	-	-	-	-	-	-	-	-	-
2022	2023	FIA Formula 2 Championship	Scoring system for sprint race	10	8	6	5	4	3	2	1	-	-	-	-	-	-	-	-	-	-	-	-
2004	2007	Champ Car World Series	1 additional bonus point for fastest driver in every qualification session 1 additional bonus point for gaining most positions in a race 1 additional bonus point for fastest race lap between 2004 and 2006; 1 additional bonus point for leading at least one race lap between 2004 and 2006	31	27	25	23	21	19	17	15	13	11	10	9	8	7	6	5	4	3	2	1
2004	2008	Atlantic Championship	1 additional bonus point for fastest driver in every qualification session 1 additional bonus point for gaining most positions in a race 1 additional bonus point for fastest race lap between 2004 and 2007; 1 additional bonus point for most led laps in 2008	31	27	25	23	21	19	17	15	13	11	10	9	8	7	6	5	4	3	2	1
2005	2023	Formula Speed	with 2 additional bonus points for pole and 1 bonus point for fastest race lap and 1 bonus point for most positions gained	25	21	18	17	16	15	14	13	12	11	10	9	8	7	6	5	4	3	2	1
2014	2016	Formula 1000	with 2 additional bonus points for pole and 1 bonus point for fastest race lap and 1 bonus point for most positions gained	25	21	18	17	16	15	14	13	12	11	10	9	8	7	6	5	4	3	2	1
2010	2024	Formula One World Championship	1 additional bonus point for fastest race lap between 2021 and 2024	25	18	15	12	10	8	6	4	2	1	-	-	-	-	-	-	-	-	-	-
2010	2010	Swedish Touring Car Championship		25	18	15	12	10	8	6	4	2	1	-	-	-	-	-	-	-	-	-	-
2010	2017	World Touring Car Championship		25	18	15	12	10	8	6	4	2	1	-	-	-	-	-	-	-	-	-	-
2011	2015	Formula Renault 2.0 Alps		25	18	15	12	10	8	6	4	2	1	-	-	-	-	-	-	-	-	-	-
2011	2018	ADAC GT Masters		25	18	15	12	10	8	6	4	2	1	-	-	-	-	-	-	-	-	-	-
2011	2020	Scandinavian Touring Car Championship		25	18	15	12	10	8	6	4	2	1	-	-	-	-	-	-	-	-	-	-
2012	2022	Deutsche Tourenwagen Masters	1 additional bonus point for fastest race lap in 2022	25	18	15	12	10	8	6	4	2	1	-	-	-	-	-	-	-	-	-	-
2012	2023	FIA Formula 2 Championship	Scoring system for feature races, 2 additional bonus points for fastest race lap and 4 additional bonus points for pole position	25	18	15	12	10	8	6	4	2	1	-	-	-	-	-	-	-	-	-	-
2012	2023	European Le Mans Series	Not used between 2014 and 2021, 1 additional bonus point for pole position	25	18	15	12	10	8	6	4	2	1	-	-	-	-	-	-	-	-	-	-
2014	2023	Formula E Championship	2 additional bonus points for fastest race lap between 2014 and 2015, 1 additional bonus point for fastest race lap between 2016 and 2023, 3 additional bonus points for pole position between 2014 and 2023	25	18	15	12	10	8	6	4	2	1	-	-	-	-	-	-	-	-	-	-
2016	2023	Formula 4 United States Championship		25	18	15	12	10	8	6	4	2	1	-	-	-	-	-	-	-	-	-	-
2016	2024	Intercontinental GT Challenge	Entries were required to complete 75% of the winning car's race distance in order to be classified and earn points. Individual drivers were required to participate for a minimum of 25 minutes in order to earn championship points in any race. A manufacturer only received points for its two highest placed cars in each round.	25	18	15	12	10	8	6	4	2	1	-	-	-	-	-	-	-	-	-	-
2018	2018	World Touring Car Cup	Scoring system for race #2 of a championship round	25	18	15	12	10	8	6	4	2	1	-	-	-	-	-	-	-	-	-	-
2018	2023	Formula Regional Americas Championship		25	18	15	12	10	8	6	4	2	1	-	-	-	-	-	-	-	-	-	-
2022	2023	FIA World Endurance Championship	Scoring system for 6 hour races	25	18	15	12	10	8	6	4	2	1	-	-	-	-	-	-	-	-	-	-
2022	2024	Le Mans Cup	Scoring system used between 2022 and 2023 for 2-hour-races, 1 additional bonus point for pole position Scoring system used in 2024 for all single-race championship rounds	25	18	15	12	10	8	6	4	2	1	-	-	-	-	-	-	-	-	-	-
2015	2021	Indy Lights	Scoring system used for drivers championship on road course and street course tracks	30	25	22	19	17	15	14	13	12	11	10	9	8	7	6	5	4	3	2	1
2023	2024	USF Pro 2000 Championship	Scoring system used for drivers championship on road course and street course tracks	30	25	22	19	17	15	14	13	12	11	10	9	8	7	6	5	4	3	2	1
2023	2024	Pacific F2000	Scoring system used for drivers championship on road course and street course tracks	30	25	22	19	17	15	14	13	12	11	10	9	8	7	6	5	4	3	2	1
2015	2021	Indy Lights	Scoring system used for drivers championship on oval tracks	45	38	33	29	26	23	21	20	18	17	15	14	12	11	9	8	6	5	4	2
2023	2024	USF Pro 2000 Championship	Scoring system used for drivers championship on oval tracks	45	38	33	29	26	23	21	20	18	17	15	14	12	11	9	8	6	5	4	2
2023	2024	Pacific F2000	Scoring system used for drivers championship on oval tracks	45	38	33	29	26	23	21	20	18	17	15	14	12	11	9	8	6	5	4	2

=== Unique scoring systems ===
This is a list of some individual points scoring systems, which were only used for one racing series or by one sanctioning body.

Year From	Year To	Championship	Comment	1st	2nd	3rd	4th	5th	6th	7th	8th	9th	10th	11th	12th	13th	14th	15th	16th	17th	18th	19th	20th
1950	1959	Formula One	Additional bonus point for fastest race lap, divided by the number of drivers which achieved fastest race lap per race. Not all race results counted towards the total championship points result.	8	6	4	3	2	-	-	-	-	-	-	-	-	-	-	-	-	-	-	-
1957	1958	Australian Drivers' Championship		8	5	3	2	1	-	-	-	-	-	-	-	-	-	-	-	-	-	-	-
1959	1963	Australian Drivers' Championship	Not all race results counted towards the total championship points result.	12	7	5	3	2	1	-	-	-	-	-	-	-	-	-	-	-	-	-	-
1966	1966	World Sportscar Championship	Scoring system used for all 1000 km, 12h or 24h races beside Le Mans 24h	10	7	5	4	3	2	-	-	-	-	-	-	-	-	-	-	-	-	-	-
1966	1966	World Sportscar Championship	Scoring system used for Le Mans 24h	12	9	7	6	4	3	-	-	-	-	-	-	-	-	-	-	-	-	-	-
1969	1969	European Formula 5000 Championship		500	350	250	200	150	100	90	80	75	70	65	60	55	50	50	50	50	50	50	50
1972	1972	European Formula 5000 Championship	Scoring system for final round, corresponds to double points from basic scoring system	18	12	10	8	6	4	2	-	-	-	-	-	-	-	-	-	-	-	-	-
1973	1975	European Formula 5000 Championship	Scoring system for final round, corresponds to double points from basic scoring system	40	30	24	20	16	12	8	6	4	2	-	-	-	-	-	-	-	-	-	-
1975	1976	SCCA/USAC Formula 5000 Championship		36	24	18	12	8	5	4	3	2	1	-	-	-	-	-	-	-	-	-	-
1975	1978	Formula Atlantic		30	24	19	15	12	10	9	8	7	6	5	4	3	2	1	-	-	-	-	-
1976	1982	Australian Touring Car Championship	Scoring system used for the final round of the season.	12	8	6	4	2	1	-	-	-	-	-	-	-	-	-	-	-	-	-	-
1979	1979	Rothmans International Series	Basic scoring system	10	9	8	7	6	5	4	3	2	1	-	-	-	-	-	-	-	-	-	-
1979	1979	Rothmans International Series	Scoring system for final round of the season	15	14	13	12	11	10	9	8	7	6	5	4	3	2	1	-	-	-	-	-
1983	1986	Australian Touring Car Championship	Scoring system used for entries with more than 3000 cm^{3} cubic capacity	25	23	20	17	15	13	11	10	9	8	7	6	5	4	3	2	1	-	-	-
1983	1986	Australian Touring Car Championship	Scoring system used for entries with less than 3000 cm^{3} cubic capacity between 1983 and 1984 respectively less than 2000 cm^{3} cubic capacity between 1985 and 1986	30	27	24	21	19	17	15	14	13	12	11	10	9	8	7	6	5	4	3	2
1985	1986	Australian Touring Car Championship	Scoring system used for entries with cubic capacity between 2001 and 3000 cm^{3}	28	26	23	20	17	15	14	13	12	11	10	9	8	7	6	5	4	3	2	1
1986	1989	ADAC Supercup		35	27	21	17	16	15	14	13	12	11	10	9	8	7	6	5	4	3	2	1
1988	1988	Australian Drivers' Championship	Not all race results counted to championship result	30	27	24	21	19	17	15	14	13	12	11	10	9	8	7	6	5	4	3	2
1988	1988	World Sportscar Championship	Scoring system for class points championship in races between 800 and 1000 km	40	30	24	20	16	12	8	6	4	2	-	-	-	-	-	-	-	-	-	-
1988	1988	World Sportscar Championship	Scoring system for class points championship in 24h races	60	45	36	30	24	18	12	9	6	3	-	-	-	-	-	-	-	-	-	-
1989	1989	World Sportscar Championship	Scoring system for class points championship for group C2 entries	22	17	14	12	10	8	6	5	4	3	-	-	-	-	-	-	-	-	-	-
1989	2011	Formula Renault 2.0 UK Championship	Not all race results counted towards the total championship points result. 1 additional bonus point for fastest race lap between 2001 and 2005; 2 additional bonus points for fastest race lap between 1989 and 2000 as well as between 2006 and 2011	32	28	25	22	20	18	16	14	12	11	10	9	8	7	6	5	4	3	2	1
1990	1996	IMSA GT Championship	Scoring system only used for Sebring 12h race, corresponds to basic scoring system with 5 additional points for all points paying ranks.	25	20	17	15	13	11	9	8	7	6	-	-	-	-	-	-	-	-	-	-
1990	1996	IMSA GT Championship	Scoring system only used for Daytona 24h race, corresponds to basic scoring system with 8 additional points for all points paying ranks.	28	23	20	18	16	14	12	11	10	9	-	-	-	-	-	-	-	-	-	-
1990	1999	GT World Challenge America		30	27	25	23	21	19	17	15	13	11	10	9	8	7	6	5	4	3	2	1
1992	1992	Grand Prix motorcycle racing		20	15	12	10	8	6	4	3	2	1	-	-	-	-	-	-	-	-	-	-
1992	1992	Australian Touring Car Championship		30	27	24	21	19	17	15	14	13	12	11	10	9	8	7	6	5	4	3	2
1993	1995	World Touring Car Cup		40	30	24	20	16	15	14	13	12	11	10	9	8	7	6	5	4	3	2	1
1995	1995	Super Tourenwagen Cup	Scoring system used for feature races	60	50	40	34	32	30	28	26	24	22	20	18	16	14	12	10	8	6	4	2
1995	1995	Australian Super Touring Championship		24	18	12	10	8	6	4	3	2	1	-	-	-	-	-	-	-	-	-	-
1996	1999	Super Tourenwagen Cup	Scoring system used for sprint races	30	24	20	17	16	15	14	13	12	11	10	9	8	7	6	5	4	3	2	1
1996	1999	Super Tourenwagen Cup	Scoring system used for feature races, corresponds to double points from sprint races	60	48	40	34	32	30	28	26	24	22	20	18	16	14	12	10	8	6	4	2
1997	1997	Australian Touring Car Championship		30	26	24	22	20	18	16	14	12	10	8	6	4	2	1	-	-	-	-	-
1997	2002	IMSA GT Championship; American Le Mans Series	Scoring system for endurance races shorter than 6 hours or with a length less than 1000 km.	25	21	19	17	15	14	13	12	11	10	9	8	7	6	5	4	3	2	1	-
1997	2002	IMSA GT Championship; American Le Mans Series	Scoring system for endurance races between 6 and 12 hours or with a length of 1000 km, corresponds to basic system with 5 additional points for all points paying ranks	30	26	24	22	20	19	18	17	16	15	14	13	12	11	10	9	8	7	6	-
1997	2002	IMSA GT Championship; American Le Mans Series	Scoring system for Daytona 24h, corresponds to basic system with 8 additional points for all points paying ranks	33	29	27	25	23	22	21	20	19	18	17	16	15	14	13	12	11	10	9	-
1998	2000	Australian Touring Car Championship	Scoring system used only in 1998 and 2000, in 2000 only for sprint races.	40	36	34	32	30	28	26	24	22	20	18	16	14	12	10	8	6	4	2	1
1998	2010	Formula Palmer Audi	Not all race results counted towards the total championship points result.	24	20	18	16	15	14	13	12	11	10	9	8	7	6	5	4	3	2	1	-
1999	2003	NZ Touring Cars Championship		32	27	23	20	18	16	14	13	12	11	10	9	8	7	6	5	4	3	2	1
1999	2010	Danish Touringcar Championship		25	20	17	15	13	12	11	10	9	8	7	6	5	4	3	2	1	-	-	-
2001	2001	European Le Mans Series	Scoring system for endurance races less than 6 hours	25	21	19	17	15	14	13	12	11	10	9	8	7	6	5	4	3	2	1	-
2001	2001	European Le Mans Series	Scoring system for endurance races between 6 and 12 hours	30	26	24	22	20	19	18	17	16	15	14	13	12	11	10	9	8	7	6	-
2001	2002	French Formula Three Championship	1 additional bonus point for pole position and fastest race lap	20	16	14	12	10	9	8	7	6	5	4	3	2	1	-	-	-	-	-	-
2001	2003	Spanish Formula Three Championship	1 additional bonus point for pole position and 2 additional points for fastest race lap	20	18	16	14	12	10	9	8	7	6	5	4	3	2	1	-	-	-	-	-
2002	2006	Formula Renault 2.0 Brazil	1 additional bonus point for pole position and fastest race lap	30	24	20	16	12	10	8	6	4	2	-	-	-	-	-	-	-	-	-	-
2002	2007	Formula TR 2000 Pro Series	1 additional bonus point for pole position and fastest race lap	30	28	26	24	22	20	18	16	14	12	10	8	6	4	2	2	2	2	2	2
2002	2010	Formula Renault 2.0 Alps	2 additional bonus points for pole position and 1 point for fastest race lap	25	22	20	18	16	14	12	10	8	6	5	4	3	2	1	-	-	-	-	-
2002	2014	British Formula Ford Championship	1 additional bonus point for fastest race lap	30	27	24	22	20	18	16	14	12	10	8	6	4	3	2	1	1	1	1	1
2002	2023	Formula Renault AsiaCup	Scoring system used only for drivers championship	30	24	20	17	15	13	11	9	7	5	4	3	2	1	-	-	-	-	-	-
2003	2013	American Le Mans Series	Scoring system used for endurance races less than 3 hours	20	16	13	10	8	6	4	3	2	1	-	-	-	-	-	-	-	-	-	-
2003	2012	American Le Mans Series	Scoring system used for endurance races between 4 and 8 hours, corresponds to the basic points system plus 3 additional points for all points paying ranks	23	19	16	13	11	9	7	6	5	4	-	-	-	-	-	-	-	-	-	-
2003	2012	American Le Mans Series	Scoring system used for endurance races between 9 and 12 hours, corresponds to the basic points system plus 6 additional points for all points paying ranks	26	22	19	16	14	12	10	9	8	7	-	-	-	-	-	-	-	-	-	-
2004	2011	Spanish Formula Three Championship	Scoring system only for race 2 of championship round between 2007 and 2011; 1 additional bonus point for pole position in 2004; 1 additional bonus point for fastest race lap between 2004 and 2006 as well as between 2009 and 2011	12	10	8	6	5	4	3	2	1	-	-	-	-	-	-	-	-	-	-	-
2005	2005	Swedish Touring Car Championship	Scoring system used for feature races	20	17	14	11	9	7	5	3	2	1	-	-	-	-	-	-	-	-	-	-
2005	2023	Formula Mazda		29	25	22	20	19	18	17	16	15	14	13	12	11	10	9	8	7	6	5	4
2006	2006	Super GT Series	Scoring system used only for Suzuka 1000 km race	25	18	13	10	8	6	4	3	2	1	-	-	-	-	-	-	-	-	-	-
2006	2018	Formula Renault 2.0 Northern European Cup		30	24	20	17	16	15	14	13	12	11	10	9	8	7	6	5	4	3	2	1
2007	2007	Formula BMW	1 additional bonus point for pole position	45	40	37	34	32	30	28	26	24	22	20	18	16	14	12	10	8	6	4	2
2007	2007	Supercars Championship	Scoring system used for races in a three races per championship round format	24	20	17	15	13	12	11	10	9	8	6	5	4	3	2	-	-	-	-	-
2007	2007	Supercars Championship	Scoring system used for races in a two races per championship round format	36	30	25	22	20	18	16	15	13	12	9	8	6	5	3	-	-	-	-	-
2007	2007	Supercars Championship	Scoring system used for single endurance races	72	60	51	45	39	36	33	30	27	24	18	15	12	9	6	-	-	-	-	-
2007	2008	Spanish Formula Three Championship	Scoring system used for race 1 of championship round 1 additional bonus point for fastest race lap	13	11	9	6	5	4	3	2	1	-	-	-	-	-	-	-	-	-	-	-
2007	2021	North American Formula 1000 Championship		22	19	17	16	15	14	13	12	11	10	9	8	7	6	5	4	3	2	1	1
2008	2008	Formula BMW	1 additional bonus point for pole position	30	24	20	18	16	14	12	10	8	6	5	4	3	2	1	-	-	-	-	-
2008	2009	North European Zone Formula 3 Cup	1 additional bonus point for pole position and fastest race lap	25	20	16	14	12	10	8	6	4	3	2	1	-	-	-	-	-	-	-	-
2009	2009	Atlantic Championship	1 additional bonus point for pole position and most positions gained in the race Not all race results counted towards the total championship points result.	20	16	14	12	10	8	7	6	5	4	3	2	1	-	-	-	-	-	-	-
2009	2011	Spanish Formula Three Championship	Scoring system used for race 1 of championship round 1 additional bonus point for fastest race lap and pole position	14	12	10	8	6	5	3	2	1	-	-	-	-	-	-	-	-	-	-	-
2009	2023	Japanese Formula 3 Championship; Super Formula Lights		10	7	5	3	2	1	-	-	-	-	-	-	-	-	-	-	-	-	-	-
2010	2012	BOSS GP Series		20	18	16	14	12	10	8	7	6	5	4	3	2	1	-	-	-	-	-	-
2010	2012	Italian Formula Three Championship	Scoring system used for sprint races 1 additional bonus point for fastest race lap	13	11	9	7	6	5	4	3	2	1	-	-	-	-	-	-	-	-	-	-
2010	2014	Australian Drivers' Championship	Scoring system used for sprint races	12	9	8	7	6	5	4	3	2	1	-	-	-	-	-	-	-	-	-	-
2010	2017	Super Formula Championship	Scoring system used for final championship round with two races	8	4	3	2.5	2	1.5	1	0.5	-	-	-	-	-	-	-	-	-	-	-	-
2011	2011	Auto GP	Scoring system used for race 2 of a championship round 1 additional bonus point for fastest race lap	18	13	10	8	6	4	2	1	-	-	-	-	-	-	-	-	-	-	-	-
2011	2012	Formula Ford EuroCup		20	14	12	10	8	6	4	3	2	1	-	-	-	-	-	-	-	-	-	-
2011	2013	Brasileiro de Marcas	Scoring system used for final round	50	40	32	28	24	20	18	16	14	12	10	8	6	4	2	-	-	-	-	-
2011	2018	TC2000 Championship	Scoring system for standard races 1 additional bonus point for pole position	26	21	18	16	14	12	10	8	7	6	5	4	3	2	1	-	-	-	-	-
2011	2018	TC2000 Championship	Scoring system for special races 1 additional bonus point for pole position	30	24	20	17	16	15	14	13	12	10	8	6	4	2	1	-	-	-	-	-
2011	2018	TC2000 Championship	Scoring system for Buenos Aires races 1 additional bonus point for pole position	34	29	25	22	20	18	16	14	12	10	8	6	4	2	1	-	-	-	-	-
2012	2012	Stock Car Pro Series	Points are awarded for each race at an event to the driver/s of a car that completed at least 75% of the race distance and was running at the completion of the race	22	20	18	17	16	15	14	13	12	11	10	9	8	7	6	5	4	3	2	1
2012	2012	Stock Car Pro Series	Scoring system used for the final race of the season. Points are awarded for each race at an event to the driver/s of a car that completed at least 75% of the race distance and was running at the completion of the race	44	40	36	34	32	30	28	26	24	22	20	18	16	14	12	10	8	6	4	2
2012	2014	ADAC Formel Masters	Scoring system for Race 3 of a championship round	15	10	8	7	6	5	4	3	2	1	-	-	-	-	-	-	-	-	-	-
2012	2015	V8SuperTourer	Scoring system used for championship rounds with three races per round	40	35	31	27	23	20	17	15	13	11	10	9	8	7	6	5	4	3	2	1
2012	2015	V8SuperTourer	Scoring system used for championship rounds with two races per round	60	53	47	41	35	30	26	23	20	17	15	13	11	9	7	5	4	3	2	1
2012	2017	Formula Pilota China	Scoring system used for Race 2 of a championship round	12	10	8	6	4	3	2	1	-	-	-	-	-	-	-	-	-	-	-	-
2013	2013	American Le Mans Series	Scoring system used for endurance races between 4 and 8 hours, corresponds to the basic points system plus 2 additional points for all points paying ranks	22	18	15	12	10	8	6	5	4	3	-	-	-	-	-	-	-	-	-	-
2013	2013	American Le Mans Series	Scoring system used for endurance races between 9 and 12 hours, corresponds to the basic points system plus 4 additional points for all points paying ranks	24	20	17	14	12	10	8	7	6	5	-	-	-	-	-	-	-	-	-	-
2013	2013	BRDC Formula 4 Championship		30	25	20	18	16	15	14	13	12	11	10	9	8	7	6	5	4	3	2	1
2013	2015	Stock Car Pro Series	Scoring system used for the final championship round. Points are awarded for each race at an event to the driver/s of a car that completed at least 75% of the race distance and was running at the completion of the race.	48	40	36	34	32	30	28	26	24	22	20	18	16	14	12	10	8	6	4	2
2013	2023	Stock Car Pro Series	Scoring system used from 2013 to 2015 for feature races. Scoring system used from 2019 to 2023 only for sprint races. Points are awarded for each race at an event to the driver/s of a car that completed at least 75% of the race distance and was running at the completion of the race.	24	20	18	17	16	15	14	13	12	11	10	9	8	7	6	5	4	3	2	1
2013	2023	BOSS GP Series	Scoring system used for class championship	25	22	20	18	16	14	12	10	9	8	7	6	5	4	3	2	1	-	-	-
2014	2014	Superstars Series	Scoring system used for championship round with a single race Additional 1 bonus point for all starters of the race, for the fastest race lap and for the pole position	32	25	21	18	16	14	12	10	8	7	6	5	4	3	2	-	-	-	-	-
2014	2014	Superstars Series	Scoring system used for championship round with a two races Additional 1 bonus point for all starters of the race, for the fastest race lap and for the pole position	24	19	16	14	12	10	9	8	7	6	5	4	3	2	1	-	-	-	-	-
2014	2015	Stock Car Pro Series	Scoring system used for championship rounds with dual races. Points are awarded for each race at an event to the driver/s of a car that completed at least 75% of the race distance and was running at the completion of the race.	12	10	9	8	7	6	5	4	3	2	1	-	-	-	-	-	-	-	-	-
2014	2016	Stock Car Pro Series	Scoring system used for the sprint races	15	13	12	11	10	9	8	7	6	5	4	3	2	1	-	-	-	-	-	-
2014	2016	Brasileiro de Marcas	Scoring system used for the final round Points are awarded for each race at an event to the driver/s of a car that completed at least 75% of the race distance and was running at the completion of the race.	46	40	36	32	28	24	20	16	14	12	10	8	6	4	2	-	-	-	-	-
2014	2017	Super Formula Championship	Scoring system used for mideseason championship rounds with two races	5	4	3	2.5	2	1.5	1	0.5	-	-	-	-	-	-	-	-	-	-	-	-
2014	2017	Brazilian Formula Three Championship		15	12	9	7	5	3	2	1	-	-	-	-	-	-	-	-	-	-	-	-
2014	2017	BRDC Formula 4 Championship	Scoring system used for Race 2 of a championship round	25	22	20	18	16	15	14	13	12	11	10	9	8	7	6	5	4	3	2	1
2014	2018	Brasileiro de Marcas	Points are awarded for each race at an event to the driver/s of a car that completed at least 75% of the race distance and was running at the completion of the race.	23	20	18	16	14	12	10	8	7	6	5	4	3	2	1	-	-	-	-	-
2014	2023	BRDC Formula 4 Championship	Scoring system used for Race 1 and 3 of a championship round	35	29	24	21	19	17	15	13	12	11	10	9	8	7	6	5	4	3	2	1
2015	2015	Supermodified racing		10	8	7	6	5	4	3	2	1	1	-	-	-	-	-	-	-	-	-	-
2015	2017	Audi Sport TT Cup		25	21	18	16	14	13	12	11	10	9	8	7	6	5	4	3	2	1	-	-
2016	2016	Stock Car Pro Series	Scoring system used for the first round Points are awarded for each race at an event to the driver/s of a car that completed at least 75% of the race distance and was running at the completion of the race	6	5	4	3	2	1	-	-	-	-	-	-	-	-	-	-	-	-	-	-
2016	2016	Stock Car Pro Series	Points are awarded for each race at an event to the driver/s of a car that completed at least 75% of the race distance and was running at the completion of the race	30	25	22	19	17	15	14	13	12	11	10	9	8	7	6	5	4	3	2	1
2016	2016	Stock Car Pro Series	Scoring system used for the final round Points are awarded for each race at an event to the driver/s of a car that completed at least 75% of the race distance and was running at the completion of the race	60	50	44	38	34	30	28	26	24	22	20	18	16	14	12	10	8	6	4	2
2017	2017	Stock Series	Points are awarded for each race at an event to the driver/s of a car that completed at least 75% of the race distance and was running at the completion of the race	20	16	13	11	9	7	6	5	4	3	2	1	-	-	-	-	-	-	-	-
2017	2017	Stock Car Pro Series	Scoring system used for the sprint races Points are awarded for each race at an event to the driver/s of a car that completed at least 75% of the race distance and was running at the completion of the race	20	18	16	14	12	10	8	7	6	5	4	3	2	1	-	-	-	-	-	-
2017	2017	Stock Car Pro Series	Scoring system used for the special Million Dollar round Points are awarded for each race at an event to the driver/s of a car that completed at least 75% of the race distance and was running at the completion of the race	30	25	22	20	19	18	17	16	15	14	13	12	11	10	9	8	7	5	3	1
2017	2017	Stock Car Pro Series	Points are awarded for each race at an event to the driver/s of a car that completed at least 75% of the race distance and was running at the completion of the race	30	26	23	21	19	17	15	13	12	11	10	9	8	7	6	5	4	3	2	1
2017	2017	Stock Car Pro Series	Scoring system used for the final championship round Points are awarded for each race at an event to the driver/s of a car that completed at least 75% of the race distance and was running at the completion of the race	60	52	46	42	38	34	30	26	24	22	20	18	16	14	12	10	8	6	4	2
2017	2018	GT World Challenge America	Entries were required to complete 50% of the winning car's race distance in order to be classified and earn points. Additional 1 bonus point for fastest qualifier / pole position	25	23	21	19	17	15	14	13	12	11	10	9	8	7	6	5	4	3	2	1
2017	2018	Brasileiro de Marcas	Scoring system used for the final round	35	30	27	24	21	18	15	12	11	9	8	6	4	3	2	-	-	-	-	-
2017	2019	ADAC TCR Germany Touring Car Championship	5 additional bonus points for pole position and 1 additional bonus point for fastest race lap	40	36	32	29	26	23	20	18	16	14	12	10	8	7	6	5	4	3	2	1
2018	2018	World Touring Car Cup	Scoring system for race #3 of a championship round	30	23	19	16	13	10	7	4	2	1	-	-	-	-	-	-	-	-	-	-
2018	2018	World Touring Car Cup	Scoring system for race #1 of a championship round	27	20	17	14	12	10	8	6	4	2	-	-	-	-	-	-	-	-	-	-
2018	2018	Stock Car Pro Series	Scoring system used for the sprint races Points are awarded for each race at an event to the driver/s of a car that completed at least 75% of the race distance and was running at the completion of the race	20	17	14	12	10	8	6	5	4	3	2	1	-	-	-	-	-	-	-	-
2018	2018	Stock Car Pro Series	Points are awarded for each race at an event to the driver/s of a car that completed at least 75% of the race distance and was running at the completion of the race	30	26	22	19	17	15	13	11	9	7	5	4	3	2	1	-	-	-	-	-
2018	2018	Stock Car Pro Series	Scoring system used for the special Million Dollar round Points are awarded for each race at an event to the driver/s of a car that completed at least 75% of the race distance and was running at the completion of the race	35	30	25	21	18	15	13	11	9	7	5	4	3	2	1	-	-	-	-	-
2018	2018	Stock Car Pro Series	Scoring system used for the final championship round Points are awarded for each race at an event to the driver/s of a car that completed at least 75% of the race distance and was running at the completion of the race	60	52	44	38	34	30	26	22	18	14	10	8	6	4	2	-	-	-	-	-
2018	2019	Super Formula Championship	Scoring system used for final championship round	13	8	6	5	4	3	2	1	-	-	-	-	-	-	-	-	-	-	-	-
2019	2020	TC2000 Championship	Scoring system used for the 200 km Buenos Aires races Additional 3 bonus points for pole position	30	25	21	17	14	11	8	5	3	1	-	-	-	-	-	-	-	-	-	-
2019	2023	Stock Car Pro Series	Points are awarded for each race at an event to the driver/s of a car that completed at least 75% of the race distance and was running at the completion of the race.	30	26	22	19	17	15	14	13	12	11	10	9	8	7	6	5	4	3	2	1
2019	2023	Stock Car Pro Series	Scoring system used for the final round Points are awarded for each race at an event to the driver/s of a car that completed at least 75% of the race distance and was running at the completion of the race.	60	52	44	38	34	30	28	26	24	22	20	18	16	14	12	10	8	6	4	2
2020	2024	Super Formula Championship		20	15	11	8	6	5	4	3	2	1	-	-	-	-	-	-	-	-	-	-
2022	2022	Stock Car Pro Series	Scoring system used for the first round (Wildcard Race); Points are awarded for each race at an event to the driver/s of a car that completed at least 75% of the race distance and was running at the completion of the race.	12	11	10	9	8	7	6	5	4	3	2	1	-	-	-	-	-	-	-	-
2022	2022	World Touring Car Cup	Scoring system for race #1 of a championship round	30	23	19	16	14	12	10	8	7	6	5	4	3	2	1	-	-	-	-	-
2022	2023	Le Mans Cup	Scoring system used for 8-hours endurance races 1 additional bonus point for pole position	38	27	23	18	15	12	9	6	3	2	-	-	-	-	-	-	-	-	-	-
2022	2023	Le Mans Cup	Scoring system used for 24-hours endurance races 1 additional bonus point for pole position	50	36	30	24	20	16	12	8	4	2	-	-	-	-	-	-	-	-	-	-
2022	2023	TC2000 Championship	Scoring system used for the race 2 of a two-race championship round.	25	21	18	14	10	7	5	4	3	1	-	-	-	-	-	-	-	-	-	-
2022	2023	TC2000 Championship	Scoring system used for the championship round with only one race.	40	32	26	20	15	10	6	4	2	1	-	-	-	-	-	-	-	-	-	-
2022	2023	TC2000 Championship	Scoring system used for the 200 km Buenos Aires races	45	39	34	30	26	22	18	14	10	8	6	4	3	2	1	-	-	-	-	-
2022	2024	Le Mans Cup	Scoring system used for races on double header weekends 1 additional bonus point for pole position	15	9	7	6	5	4	3	2	1	-	-	-	-	-	-	-	-	-	-	-
2023	2023	TCR World Tour		30	25	22	20	18	16	14	12	10	8	6	4	3	2	1	-	-	-	-	-

== Limited race scoring systems (more than 20 points positions) ==
Year From	Year To	Championship	Comment	1st	2nd	3rd	4th	5th	6th	7th	8th	9th	10th	11th	12th	13th	14th	15th	16th	17th	18th	19th	20th	21st	22nd	23rd	24th	25th	26th	27th	28th	29th	30th	31st	32nd	33rd	34th	35th	36th	37th	38th	39th	40th	41st	42nd	43rd	44th	45th	46th	47th	48th	49th	50th	51st	52nd	53rd	54th
1953	2018	ARCA Racing Series		200	195	190	185	180	175	170	165	160	155	150	145	140	135	130	125	120	115	110	105	100	95	90	85	80	75	70	65	60	55	50	45	40	35	30	25	20	15	10	5	5	5	5	5	5	5	5	5	5	5	-	-	-	-
1972	1972	NASCAR Cup Series	There were additional bonus points for completed race laps, which depended on the length of the race track.	100	98	96	94	92	90	88	86	84	82	80	78	76	74	72	70	68	66	64	62	60	58	56	54	52	50	48	46	44	42	40	38	36	34	32	30	28	26	24	22	20	18	16	14	12	10	8	6	4	2	-	-	-	-
1973	1973	NASCAR Cup Series	There were additional bonus points for completed race laps, which depended on the length of the race track.	125	98	96	94	92	90	88	86	84	82	80	78	76	74	72	70	68	66	64	62	60	58	56	54	52	50	48	46	44	42	40	38	36	34	32	30	28	26	24	22	20	18	16	14	12	10	8	6	4	2	-	-	-	-
1975	2003	NASCAR Cup Series	additional 5 bonus points for every driver who led at least one lap, additional 5 bonus points for the driver with most laps led	175	170	165	160	155	150	146	142	138	134	130	127	124	121	118	115	112	109	106	103	100	97	94	81	88	85	82	79	76	73	70	67	64	61	58	55	52	49	46	43	40	37	34	31	28	25	22	19	16	13	10	7	4	1
1990	1999	Trans-Am Series		30	27	25	23	21	19	18	17	16	15	14	13	12	11	10	9	8	7	6	5	4	3	2	1	1	-	-	-	-	-	-	-	-	-	-	-	-	-	-	-	-	-	-	-	-	-	-	-	-	-	-	-	-	-
1996	1996	Indy Racing League	At the end of the season, the total points from individual races are multiplied by the number of races in which a driver has participated.	35	33	32	31	30	29	28	27	26	25	24	23	22	21	20	19	18	17	16	15	14	13	12	11	10	9	8	7	6	5	4	3	2	-	-	-	-	-	-	-	-	-	-	-	-	-	-	-	-	-	-	-	-	-
1997	1997	Indy Racing League	additional 2 bonus points for pole position and 1 point for most led laps	35	33	32	31	30	29	28	27	26	25	24	23	22	21	20	19	18	17	16	15	14	13	12	11	10	9	8	7	6	5	4	3	2	1	1	-	-	-	-	-	-	-	-	-	-	-	-	-	-	-	-	-	-	-
1998	2002	Indy Racing League	additional 2 bonus points for most led laps additional 3-2-1 bonus points for the first three qualifiers between 1998 and 2000	50	40	35	32	30	28	26	24	22	20	19	18	17	16	15	14	13	12	11	10	9	8	7	6	5	4	3	2	1	1	1	1	1	-	-	-	-	-	-	-	-	-	-	-	-	-	-	-	-	-	-	-	-	-
1999	1999	Supercars Championship	Scoring system used for sprint races	50	46	44	42	40	38	36	34	32	30	28	26	24	22	20	18	16	14	12	10	8	6	4	2	1	-	-	-	-	-	-	-	-	-	-	-	-	-	-	-	-	-	-	-	-	-	-	-	-	-	-	-	-	-
1999	1999	Supercars Championship	Scoring system used for endurance races	300	276	264	252	240	228	216	204	192	180	168	156	144	132	120	108	96	84	72	60	48	36	24	12	6	-	-	-	-	-	-	-	-	-	-	-	-	-	-	-	-	-	-	-	-	-	-	-	-	-	-	-	-	-
2000	2009	Trans-Am Series		30	27	25	23	21	20	19	18	17	16	15	14	13	12	11	10	9	8	7	6	5	4	3	2	1	-	-	-	-	-	-	-	-	-	-	-	-	-	-	-	-	-	-	-	-	-	-	-	-	-	-	-	-	-
2002	2003	V8Star Series		26	24	23	22	21	20	19	18	17	16	15	14	13	12	11	10	9	8	7	6	5	4	3	2	1	-	-	-	-	-	-	-	-	-	-	-	-	-	-	-	-	-	-	-	-	-	-	-	-	-	-	-	-	-
2002	2003	V8Star Series		32	30	29	28	27	26	25	24	23	22	21	20	19	18	17	16	15	14	13	12	11	10	9	8	7	6	5	4	3	2	-	-	-	-	-	-	-	-	-	-	-	-	-	-	-	-	-	-	-	-	-	-	-	-
2002	2010	Indy Lights	Scoring system used for drivers championship additional 2 bonus points for most led laps between 2002 and 2005 additional 2 bonus points for most led laps and 1 bonus point for fastest qualifier between 2006 and 2010	50	40	35	32	30	28	26	24	22	20	19	18	17	16	15	14	13	12	11	10	9	8	7	6	5	4	3	3	3	3	3	3	3	-	-	-	-	-	-	-	-	-	-	-	-	-	-	-	-	-	-	-	-	-
2003	2005	Supercars Championship	Scoring system used for championship rounds with one endurance race.	192	186	180	174	168	162	156	150	144	138	132	126	120	114	108	102	96	90	84	78	72	66	60	54	48	42	36	30	24	18	12	6	-	-	-	-	-	-	-	-	-	-	-	-	-	-	-	-	-	-	-	-	-	-
2003	2005	Supercars Championship	Scoring system used for championship rounds with two races.	96	93	90	87	84	81	78	75	72	69	66	63	60	57	54	51	48	45	42	39	36	33	30	27	24	21	18	15	12	9	6	3	-	-	-	-	-	-	-	-	-	-	-	-	-	-	-	-	-	-	-	-	-	-
2003	2006	Supercars Championship	Scoring system used for championship rounds with three races. In 2006 only used for races with reverse grid starting positions.	64	62	60	58	56	54	52	50	48	46	44	42	40	38	36	34	32	30	28	26	24	22	20	18	16	14	12	10	8	6	4	2	-	-	-	-	-	-	-	-	-	-	-	-	-	-	-	-	-	-	-	-	-	-
2004	2006	NASCAR Cup Series	additional 5 bonus points for every driver who led at least one lap, additional 5 bonus points for the driver with most laps led	180	170	165	160	155	150	146	142	138	134	130	127	124	121	118	115	112	109	106	103	100	97	94	81	88	85	82	79	76	73	70	67	64	61	58	55	52	49	46	43	40	37	34	31	28	25	22	19	16	13	10	7	4	1
2004	2012	IndyCar Series	additional 3 bonus points for most led laps between 2004 and 2008 additional 2 bonus points for most led laps and 1 bonus point for fastest qualifier between 2009 and 2012	50	40	35	32	30	28	26	24	22	20	19	18	17	16	15	14	13	12	12	12	12	12	12	12	10	10	10	10	10	10	10	10	10	-	-	-	-	-	-	-	-	-	-	-	-	-	-	-	-	-	-	-	-	-
2011	2014	Indy Lights		50	40	35	32	30	28	26	24	22	20	19	18	17	16	15	14	13	12	12	12	12	12	12	12	10	10	10	10	10	10	10	10	10	-	-	-	-	-	-	-	-	-	-	-	-	-	-	-	-	-	-	-	-	-
2004	2023	NZ Touring Cars Championship		75	67	60	54	49	45	42	39	36	33	30	28	26	24	22	20	18	16	14	12	10	9	8	7	6	5	4	3	2	1	-	-	-	-	-	-	-	-	-	-	-	-	-	-	-	-	-	-	-	-	-	-	-	-
2005	2022	Hong Kong Touring Car Championship	In fact, only the first 15 positions of a race are included in the championship.	40	35	32	30	28	26	25	24	23	22	21	20	19	18	17	16	15	14	13	12	11	10	9	8	7	6	5	4	3	2	-	-	-	-	-	-	-	-	-	-	-	-	-	-	-	-	-	-	-	-	-	-	-	-
2006	2006	Supercars Championship	Scoring system used for final four championship rounds with three races.	107	103	100	97	93	90	87	83	80	77	73	70	67	63	60	57	53	50	47	43	40	37	33	30	27	23	20	17	13	10	7	3	-	-	-	-	-	-	-	-	-	-	-	-	-	-	-	-	-	-	-	-	-	-
2006	2006	Supercars Championship	Scoring system used for championship rounds with three races and normal starting grid.	128	124	120	116	112	108	104	100	96	92	88	84	80	76	72	68	64	60	56	52	48	44	40	36	32	28	24	20	16	12	8	4	-	-	-	-	-	-	-	-	-	-	-	-	-	-	-	-	-	-	-	-	-	-
2006	2006	Supercars Championship	Scoring system used for championship rounds with two races.	160	155	150	145	140	135	130	125	120	115	110	105	100	95	90	85	80	75	70	65	60	55	50	45	40	35	30	25	20	15	10	5	-	-	-	-	-	-	-	-	-	-	-	-	-	-	-	-	-	-	-	-	-	-
2006	2006	Supercars Championship	Scoring system used for championship rounds with one endurance race.	320	310	300	290	280	270	260	250	240	230	220	210	200	190	180	170	160	150	140	130	120	110	100	90	80	70	60	50	40	30	20	10	-	-	-	-	-	-	-	-	-	-	-	-	-	-	-	-	-	-	-	-	-	-
2007	2009	NASCAR Cup Series	additional 5 bonus points for every driver who led at least one lap, additional 5 bonus points for the driver with most laps led	185	170	165	160	155	150	146	142	138	134	130	127	124	121	118	115	112	109	106	103	100	97	94	81	88	85	82	79	76	73	70	67	64	61	58	55	52	49	46	43	40	37	34	31	28	25	22	19	16	13	10	7	4	1
2007	2011	USF Pro 2000 Championship		44	40	37	34	32	30	29	28	27	26	25	24	23	22	21	20	19	18	17	16	15	14	13	12	11	10	9	8	7	6	5	4	3	2	1	-	-	-	-	-	-	-	-	-	-	-	-	-	-	-	-	-	-	-
2008	2008	Superleague Formula		50	45	40	36	32	29	26	23	20	18	16	14	12	10	8	7	6	5	4	3	2	1	-	-	-	-	-	-	-	-	-	-	-	-	-	-	-	-	-	-	-	-	-	-	-	-	-	-	-	-	-	-	-	-
2008	2023	Supercars Championship	Scoring system used for championship rounds with three races and normal starting grid. Between 2018 and 2019 only used for Melbourne round. Between 2020 and 2023 used for Supersprint races. Point values are two times the base system. Additional 5 bonus points for fastest race lap since 2021; Points are awarded for each race at an event to the driver/s of a car that completed at least 75% of the race distance and was running at the completion of the race	100	92	86	80	74	68	64	60	56	52	48	46	44	42	40	38	36	34	32	30	28	26	24	22	20	18	16	14	12	10	-	-	-	-	-	-	-	-	-	-	-	-	-	-	-	-	-	-	-	-	-	-	-	-
2008	2024	Supercars Championship	Scoring system used for championship rounds with two races or with races in length between 200 and 300 km. Standard scoring system since 2017. Point values are three times the base system. Points are awarded for each race at an event to the driver/s of a car that completed at least 75% of the race distance and was running at the completion of the race	150	138	129	120	111	102	96	90	84	78	72	69	66	63	60	57	54	51	48	45	42	39	36	33	30	27	24	21	18	15	-	-	-	-	-	-	-	-	-	-	-	-	-	-	-	-	-	-	-	-	-	-	-	-
2008	2024	Supercars Championship	Scoring system used for championship rounds with one endurance race of 1000 km length. Point values are six times the base system. Points are awarded for each race at an event to the driver/s of a car that completed at least 75% of the race distance and was running at the completion of the race	300	276	258	240	222	204	192	180	168	156	144	138	132	126	120	114	108	102	96	90	84	78	72	66	60	54	48	42	36	30	-	-	-	-	-	-	-	-	-	-	-	-	-	-	-	-	-	-	-	-	-	-	-	-
2009	2014	Supercars Championship	Scoring system used for championship rounds with one endurance race of 500 km length. Point values are four times the base system. Points are awarded for each race at an event to the driver/s of a car that completed at least 75% of the race distance and was running at the completion of the race	200	184	172	160	148	136	128	120	112	104	96	92	88	84	80	76	72	68	64	60	56	52	48	44	40	36	32	28	24	20	-	-	-	-	-	-	-	-	-	-	-	-	-	-	-	-	-	-	-	-	-	-	-	-
2009	2019	Supercars Championship	Basic point system from which all other points systems are derived. This system was used only for qualification or sprint races with length of 100 km or below.	50	46	43	40	37	34	32	30	28	26	24	23	22	21	20	19	18	17	16	15	14	13	12	11	10	9	8	7	6	5	-	-	-	-	-	-	-	-	-	-	-	-	-	-	-	-	-	-	-	-	-	-	-	-
2009	2024	Supercars Championship	Scoring system used for championship rounds with four races and normal starting grid or for races between 60 and 125 km in length Between 2020 and 2024 only used for Melbourne round. Point values are 1.5 times the base system. Additional 5 bonus points for fastest race lap since 2021; Points are awarded for each race at an event to the driver/s of a car that completed at least 75% of the race distance and was running at the completion of the race	75	69	65	60	56	51	48	45	42	39	36	35	33	32	30	29	27	26	24	23	21	20	18	17	15	14	12	11	9	8	-	-	-	-	-	-	-	-	-	-	-	-	-	-	-	-	-	-	-	-	-	-	-	-
2010	2010	Intercontinental Le Mans Cup	The points scale for the championship included all individual race participants who completed 70% of the winner's distance, although points were only awarded to designated entries in the Intercontinental Cup. Additional one bonus point for pole position.	25	22	20	19	18	17	16	15	14	13	12	11	10	9	8	7	6	5	4	3	2	1	-	-	-	-	-	-	-	-	-	-	-	-	-	-	-	-	-	-	-	-	-	-	-	-	-	-	-	-	-	-	-	-
2010	2011	SCCA Pro Racing World Challenge	additional 5 bonus points for every driver who led at least one lap, additional 5 bonus points for the driver with most laps led	110	100	92	85	80	76	72	68	64	60	57	54	51	48	45	43	41	39	37	35	33	31	29	27	25	23	21	19	17	15	13	11	9	7	6	5	4	3	2	1	-	-	-	-	-	-	-	-	-	-	-	-	-	-
2011	2011	IndyCar Series	Scoring system used for the two twin races at championship round in Texas additional 2 bonus points for most led laps in both races and 1 bonus point for fastest qualifier in the first race	25	20	18	16	15	14	13	12	11	10	9	9	8	8	7	7	6	6	6	6	6	6	6	6	5	5	5	5	5	5	5	5	5	-	-	-	-	-	-	-	-	-	-	-	-	-	-	-	-	-	-	-	-	-
2011	2015	NASCAR Cup Series	additional 1 bonus point for every driver who led a lap, additional 1 bonus point for driver who led most laps	46	42	41	40	39	38	37	36	35	34	33	32	31	30	29	28	27	26	25	24	23	22	21	20	19	18	17	16	15	14	13	12	11	10	9	8	7	6	5	4	3	2	1	-	-	-	-	-	-	-	-	-	-	-
2012	2015	Pirelli World Challenge	additional 5 bonus points for every driver who led at least one lap, additional 5 bonus points for the driver with most laps led	140	110	95	85	80	76	72	68	64	60	57	54	51	48	45	43	41	39	37	35	33	31	29	27	25	23	21	19	17	15	13	11	9	7	6	5	4	3	2	1	-	-	-	-	-	-	-	-	-	-	-	-	-	-
2013	2024	IndyCar Series	additional 1 bonus points for every driver who led a lap, additional 2 bonus points for most led laps and additional 1 bonus point for fastest qualifier	50	40	35	32	30	28	26	24	22	20	19	18	17	16	15	14	13	12	11	10	9	8	7	6	5	5	5	5	5	5	5	5	5	-	-	-	-	-	-	-	-	-	-	-	-	-	-	-	-	-	-	-	-	-
2014	2022	IndyCar Series	Scoring system used for Indy 500 and last race of the season and also in 2014 for all 500-mile Triple Crown events additional 2 bonus points for most led laps	100	80	70	64	60	56	52	48	44	40	38	36	34	32	30	28	26	24	22	20	18	16	14	12	10	10	10	10	10	10	10	10	10	-	-	-	-	-	-	-	-	-	-	-	-	-	-	-	-	-	-	-	-	-
2016	2016	Pirelli World Challenge	additional 7 bonus points for pole position	110	98	90	84	80	76	72	68	64	60	57	54	51	48	45	43	41	39	37	35	33	31	29	27	25	23	21	19	17	15	13	11	9	7	6	5	4	3	2	1	-	-	-	-	-	-	-	-	-	-	-	-	-	-
2016	2016	International Supermodified Association		100	88	81	74	67	62	57	52	47	42	39	36	33	30	27	24	21	18	15	12	9	6	3	2	1	1	1	1	1	1	-	-	-	-	-	-	-	-	-	-	-	-	-	-	-	-	-	-	-	-	-	-	-	-
2016	2016	NASCAR Cup Series	additional 1 bonus point for every driver who led a lap, additional 1 bonus point for driver who led most laps	43	39	38	37	36	35	34	33	32	31	30	29	28	27	26	25	24	23	22	21	20	19	18	17	16	15	14	13	12	11	10	9	8	7	6	5	4	3	2	1	-	-	-	-	-	-	-	-	-	-	-	-	-	-
2017	2017	V de V Challenge Monoplace	Scoring system for overall race results additional points for earch class are awarded	35	32	29	27	25	23	21	19	17	15	13	12	11	10	9	8	7	6	5	4	3	2	1	1	1	1	1	1	1	1	-	-	-	-	-	-	-	-	-	-	-	-	-	-	-	-	-	-	-	-	-	-	-	-
2017	2024	NASCAR Cup Series	Additional bonus points for stages and playoffs	40	35	34	33	32	31	30	29	28	27	26	25	24	23	22	21	20	19	18	17	16	15	14	13	12	11	10	9	8	7	6	5	4	3	2	1	1	1	1	1	-	-	-	-	-	-	-	-	-	-	-	-	-	-
2019	2019	ARCA Racing Series	In 2020, the ARCA series was bought by NASCAR and subsequently used their points system.	235	220	215	210	205	200	195	190	185	180	175	170	165	160	155	150	145	140	135	130	125	120	115	110	105	100	95	90	85	80	75	70	65	60	55	50	45	40	35	30	25	20	15	10	5	5	5	5	5	5	-	-	-	-
2019	2019	Supercars Championship	Scoring system used for championship rounds with one endurance race of 500 km length Point values are five times the base system. Points are awarded for each race at an event to the driver/s of a car that completed at least 75% of the race distance and was running at the completion of the race	250	230	215	200	185	170	160	150	140	130	120	115	110	105	100	95	90	85	80	75	70	65	60	55	50	45	40	35	30	25	-	-	-	-	-	-	-	-	-	-	-	-	-	-	-	-	-	-	-	-	-	-	-	-
2023	2024	Atlantic Championship Series	Not all results counted towards total points scoring. additional 3 bonus points for pole position and additional 2 bonus points for fastest race lap	50	42	37	34	31	29	27	25	23	21	19	17	15	13	11	10	9	8	7	6	5	4	3	2	1	1	1	1	1	1	1	1	1	-	-	-	-	-	-	-	-	-	-	-	-	-	-	-	-	-	-	-	-	-
2022	2025	F1600 Championship Series	Not all results counted towards total points scoring. additional 3 bonus points for pole position and additional 2 bonus points for fastest race lap	50	42	37	34	31	29	27	25	23	21	19	17	15	13	11	10	9	8	7	6	5	4	3	2	1	1	1	1	1	1	1	1	1	1	1	1	1	1	1	1	1	1	1	1	1	1	1	1	1	1	1	1	1	1
2024	2024	Stock Car Pro Series	Scoring system used for sprint races Points are awarded for each race at an event to the driver/s of a car that completed at least 75% of the race distance and was running at the completion of the race	55	50	46	42	38	36	34	32	30	28	26	24	22	20	18	16	14	13	12	11	10	9	8	7	6	5	4	3	2	1	-	-	-	-	-	-	-	-	-	-	-	-	-	-	-	-	-	-	-	-	-	-	-	-
2024	2024	Stock Car Pro Series	Scoring system used for main races Additional 2 bonus points for fastes qualifier / pole position Points are awarded for each race at an event to the driver/s of a car that completed at least 75% of the race distance and was running at the completion of the race	80	74	69	64	59	55	51	47	43	40	37	34	31	28	25	22	19	17	15	13	12	11	10	9	8	7	6	5	4	3	-	-	-	-	-	-	-	-	-	-	-	-	-	-	-	-	-	-	-	-	-	-	-	-

== Unlimited race scoring systems ==
The following tables showing points scoring systems that formally have no limits on points paying ranks. They are mostly used in long-distance and endurance races with large fields of participants. They are in practice only limited by the number of actual participants.

=== ACO ===
Seasons (Series)	Position	1st	2nd	3rd	4th	5th	6th	7th	8th	9th	10th	11th	12th+
2010–2011 (LMS 1000 km) 2011 (ILC)	Points	15	13	11	9	8	7	6	5	4	3	2	1
2010–2011 (LMS 1500 km) 2011 (ILC 24h)	Points	30	26	22	18	16	14	12	10	8	6	4	2
2014–2021 (ELMS) 2016–2021 (LMC)	Points	25	18	15	12	10	8	6	4	2	1	0.5	0.5
2017–2021 (LMC Double Header)	Points	15	9	7	6	5	4	3	2	1	0.5	0.5	0.5

=== FIA ===
Seasons (Series)	Position	1st	2nd	3rd	4th	5th	6th	7th	8th	9th	10th	11th+
2012–2021 (WEC 6h)	Points	25	18	15	12	10	8	6	3	2	1	0.5
2012–2017 (WEC Le Mans 24h) 2019–2021 (WEC Le Mans 24h)	Points	50	36	30	24	20	16	12	8	4	2	1
2018 (WEC 8h)	Points	32	23	19	15	13	10	8	5	3	2	1
2018 (WEC Le Mans 24h) 2019–2021 (WEC 8h)	Points	38	27	23	18	15	12	9	6	3	2	1

=== IMSA ===
Year From	Year To	Championship	Comment	1st	2nd	3rd	4th	5th	6th	7th	8th	9th	10th	11th	12th	13th	14th	15th	16th	17th	18th	19th	20th	21st	22nd	23rd	24th	25th	26th	27th	28th	29th	30th+
2014	2024	IMSA SportsCar Championship	Scoring system used for races between 2014 and 2020; Scoring system used for qualifying between 2021 and 2024	35	32	30	28	26	25	24	23	22	21	20	19	18	17	16	15	14	13	12	11	10	9	8	7	6	5	4	3	2	1
2021	2024	IMSA SportsCar Championship		350	320	300	280	260	250	240	230	220	210	200	190	180	170	160	150	140	130	120	110	100	90	80	70	60	50	40	30	20	10

== Mileage based scoring systems ==
The following section provides an overview of scoring systems that were used based on a defined mileage (length) of a race in a season. Point systems that simply differentiate between sprint and long-distance races without a defined length are not taken into account.

=== AAA/USAC ===
Year From	Year To	Mileage	Comment	1st	2nd	3rd	4th	5th	6th	7th	8th	9th	10th	11th	12th	13th	14th	15th	16th	17th	18th	19th	20th	21st	22nd	23rd	24th	25th	26th	27th	28th	29th	30th	31st	32nd	33rd	34th	35th
1930	1936	100–149 miles	Scoring system used for races between 100 and 150 miles in length	120	90	80	70	60	50	40	30	20	10	-	-	-	-	-	-	-	-	-	-
1930	1936	150–199 miles	Scoring system used for races between 150 and 200 miles in length	180	135	120	105	90	75	60	45	30	15	-	-	-	-	-	-	-	-	-	-
1930	1936	200–299 miles	Scoring system used for races between 200 and 300 miles in length	240	180	160	140	120	100	80	60	40	20	-	-	-	-	-	-	-	-	-	-
1930	1936	300–399 miles	Scoring system used for races between 300 and 400 miles in length	360	270	240	210	180	150	120	90	60	30	-	-	-	-	-	-	-	-	-	-
1930	1936	400–499 miles	Scoring system used for races between 400 and 500 miles in length	480	360	320	280	240	200	160	120	80	40	-	-	-	-	-	-	-	-	-	-
1930	1936	500 miles	Scoring system used only for Indianapolis 500 race	600	450	400	350	300	250	200	150	100	50	-	-	-	-	-	-	-	-	-	-
1937	1941	100–299 miles	Scoring system used for races between 100 and 300 miles in length	200	165	135	110	90	75	65	55	45	35	25	15	-	-	-	-	-	-	-	-
1937	1941	300–499 miles	Scoring system used for races between 300 and 500 miles in length	600	495	405	330	270	225	195	165	135	105	75	45	-	-	-	-	-	-	-	-
1937	1941	500 miles	Scoring system used only for the Indy 500 race	1000	825	675	550	450	375	325	275	225	175	125	75	-	-	-	-	-	-	-	-
1946	1977	50–99 miles	Scoring system used for races shorter than 100 miles in length	100	80	70	60	50	40	30	25	20	15	10	5	-	-	-	-	-	-	-	-
1946	1977	100–149 miles	Scoring system used for races between 100 and 150 miles in length	200	160	140	120	100	80	60	50	40	30	20	10	-	-	-	-	-	-	-	-
1946	1977	150–199 miles	Scoring system used for races between 150 and 200 miles in length	300	240	210	180	150	120	90	75	60	45	30	15	-	-	-	-	-	-	-	-
1946	1977	200–249 miles	Scoring system used for races between 200 and 250 miles in length	400	320	280	240	200	160	120	100	80	60	40	20	-	-	-	-	-	-	-	-
1946	1977	250–299 miles	Scoring system used for races between 250 and 300 miles in length	500	400	350	300	250	200	150	125	100	75	50	25	-	-	-	-	-	-	-	-
1946	1977	300–349 miles	Scoring system used for races between 300 and 350 miles in length	600	480	420	360	300	240	180	150	120	90	60	30	-	-	-	-	-	-	-	-
1946	1977	350–399 miles	Existing scoring system according rules for races between 350 and 400 miles in length, never used as there were no races of this length at that time.	700	560	490	420	350	280	210	175	140	105	70	35	-	-	-	-	-	-	-	-
1946	1977	400–499 miles	Scoring system used for races between 400 and 500 miles in length	800	640	560	480	400	320	240	200	160	120	80	40	-	-	-	-	-	-	-	-
1946	1977	500 miles	Scoring system used only for the Indy 500 race between 1946 and 1970 and used for all 500 mile "Triple-Crown"-races between 1971 and 1977	1000	800	600	500	400	350	300	250	200	150	100	50	-	-	-	-	-	-	-	-
1978	1978	100 miles		200	160	140	120	100	80	60	50	40	30	20	10	5	5	5	5	4	4	4	4	3	3	3	3	2	2	2	2	1	1	1	1	1	1	1
1978	1978	150 miles		300	240	210	180	150	120	90	75	60	45	30	15	8	8	8	8	6	6	6	6	5	5	5	5	3	3	3	3	2	2	2	2	2	2	2
1978	1978	200 miles		400	320	280	240	200	160	120	100	80	60	40	20	10	10	10	10	8	8	8	8	6	6	6	6	4	4	4	4	2	2	2	2	2	2	2
1978	1978	250 miles		500	400	350	300	250	200	150	125	100	75	50	25	12	12	12	12	10	10	10	10	8	8	8	8	5	5	5	5	3	3	3	3	3	3	3
1978	1978	300 miles		600	480	420	360	300	240	180	150	120	90	60	30	15	15	15	15	12	12	12	12	9	9	9	9	6	6	6	6	3	3	3	3	3	3	3
1978	1978	400 miles		800	640	560	480	400	320	240	200	160	120	80	40	20	20	20	20	16	16	16	16	12	12	12	12	8	8	8	8	4	4	4	4	4	4	4
1978	1978	500 miles		1000	800	700	600	500	400	300	250	200	150	100	50	25	25	25	25	20	20	20	20	15	15	15	15	10	10	10	10	5	5	5	5	5	5	5

=== CART ===
Year From	Year To	Mileage	Comment	1st	2nd	3rd	4th	5th	6th	7th	8th	9th	10th	11th	12th	13th	14th	15th	16th	17th	18th	19th	20th
1981	1982	50–199 miles	Additional 1 bonus point for most led laps	20	16	14	12	10	8	6	5	4	3	2	1	1	1	1	1	1	1	1	1
1981	1982	200–299 miles	Additional 2 bonus points for most led laps	40	32	28	24	20	16	12	10	8	6	4	2	2	2	2	2	2	2	2	2
1981	1982	300–399 miles	Additional 3 bonus points for most led laps	60	48	42	36	30	24	18	15	12	9	6	3	3	3	3	3	3	3	3	3
1981	1982	400–499 miles	Additional 4 bonus points for most led laps	80	64	56	48	40	32	24	20	16	12	8	4	4	4	4	4	4	4	4	4
1981	1982	500 miles	Scoring system used for all 500 mile "Triple-Crown"-races, additional 5 bonus points for most led laps	100	80	60	50	40	35	30	25	20	15	10	5	5	5	5	5	5	5	5	5

=== NASCAR ===
Year From	Year To	Mileage	Comment	1st	2nd	3rd	4th	5th	6th	7th	8th	9th	10th	11th	12th	13th	14th	15th	16th	17th	18th	19th	20th	21st	22nd	23rd	24th	25th	26th	27th	28th	29th	30th	31st	32nd	33rd	34th	35th	36th	37th	38th	39th	40th	41st	42nd	43rd	44th	45th	46th	47th	48th	49th	50th
1968	1971	100–250 miles		50	49	48	47	46	45	44	43	42	41	40	39	38	37	36	35	34	33	32	31	30	29	28	27	26	25	24	23	22	21	20	19	18	17	16	15	14	13	12	11	10	9	8	7	6	5	4	3	2	1
1968	1971	251–399 miles		100	98	96	94	92	90	88	86	84	82	80	78	76	74	72	70	68	66	64	62	60	58	56	54	52	50	48	46	44	42	40	38	36	34	32	30	28	26	24	22	20	18	16	14	12	10	8	6	4	2
1968	1971	400–600 miles		150	147	144	141	138	135	132	129	126	123	120	117	114	111	108	105	102	99	96	93	90	87	84	81	78	75	72	69	66	63	60	57	54	51	48	45	42	39	36	33	30	27	24	21	18	15	12	9	6	3

=== SuperCars ===
Year From	Year To	Mileage	Comment	1st	2nd	3rd	4th	5th	6th	7th	8th	9th	10th	11th	12th	13th	14th	15th	16th	17th	18th	19th	20th	21st	22nd	23rd	24th	25th	26th	27th	28th	29th	30th	31st	32nd
2000	2000	100–250 km	Scoring system used for 250 km races beside Adelaide round	60	54	51	48	45	42	39	36	33	30	27	24	21	18	15	12	9	6	3	1
2000	2000	250–300 km	Scoring system used for 250 km races in Adelaide	80	72	68	64	60	56	48	44	40	36	32	28	24	20	16	14	12	8	4	2
2000	2000	400 km		120	108	102	96	90	84	78	72	66	60	54	48	42	36	30	24	18	12	6	3
2000	2000	600 km		160	144	136	128	120	112	104	96	88	80	72	64	56	48	40	32	24	16	8	4
2000	2000	1000 km		240	216	204	192	180	168	156	144	132	120	108	96	84	72	60	48	36	24	12	6
2001	2001	50–100 km		90	80	72	66	62	58	54	50	48	46	44	42	40	38	36	34	32	30	28	26	24	22	20	18	16	14	12	10	8	6	4	2
2001	2001	101–200 km		135	120	108	99	93	87	81	75	72	69	66	63	60	57	54	51	48	45	42	39	36	33	30	27	24	21	18	15	12	9	6	3
2001	2001	201–400 km		180	160	144	132	124	116	108	100	96	92	88	84	80	76	72	68	64	60	56	52	48	44	40	36	32	28	24	20	16	12	8	4
2001	2001	500 km		360	320	288	264	248	232	216	200	192	184	176	168	160	152	144	136	128	120	112	104	96	88	80	72	64	56	48	40	32	24	16	8
2001	2001	1000 km		540	480	432	396	372	348	324	300	288	276	264	252	240	228	216	204	192	180	168	156	144	132	120	108	96	84	72	60	48	36	24	12
2002	2002	50–100 km		80	64	51	42	35	32	29	26	24	23	22	21	20	19	18	17	16	15	14	13	12	11	10	9	8	7	6	5	4	3	2	1
2002	2002	101–200 km		100	80	64	52	44	40	36	32	30	28	26	24	22	20	18	17	16	15	14	13	12	11	10	9	8	7	6	5	4	3	2	1
2002	2002	200–300 km	Scoring system used for the 300 km race in Sandown	160	128	102	83	70	64	58	51	48	45	42	38	35	32	29	27	26	24	22	21	19	18	16	14	13	11	10	8	6	5	3	2
2002	2002	300–400 km	Scoring system used for the race in Adelaide, which were only 250 km in length	200	160	128	104	88	80	72	64	60	56	52	48	44	40	36	34	32	30	28	26	24	22	20	18	16	14	12	10	8	6	4	2
2002	2002	400 km	Scoring system used for the 400 km race in Canberra	240	192	154	125	106	96	86	77	72	67	62	58	53	48	43	41	38	36	34	31	29	26	24	22	19	17	14	12	10	7	5	3
2002	2002	401–1000 km		400	320	256	208	176	160	144	128	120	112	104	96	88	80	72	68	64	60	56	52	48	44	40	36	32	28	24	20	16	12	8	4

== Other scoring systems ==
Table of points scoring systems for qualification or other purposes.

=== Qualification or Sprint races ===
Seasons (Series)	Purpose	1st	2nd	3rd	4th	5th	6th	7th	8th	9th	10th	11th	12th	13th	14th	15th	16th	17th	18th	19th	20th	21st	22nd	23rd	24th	25th	26th	27th	28th	29th	30th	31st	32nd	33rd
1998–2002 (IRL) 2001–2002 (DTM) 2017–2023 (DTM) 2022–2023 (GTM) 2020–2023 (TC 2000) 2020–2023 (Super Formula) 2021 (Formula One)	Qualification / Sprint race points	3	2	1	-	-	-	-	-	-	-	-	-	-	-	-	-	-	-	-	-	-	-	-	-	-	-	-	-	-	-	-	-	-
2001 (Super Cars)	Qualification race	18	16	14	13	12	11	10	9	8	7	-	-	-	-	-	-	-	-	-	-	-	-	-	-	-	-	-	-	-	-	-	-	-
2005–2011 (GP2)	Sprint race points	6	5	4	3	2	1	-	-	-	-	-	-	-	-	-	-	-	-	-	-	-	-	-	-	-	-	-	-	-	-	-	-	-
2008 (Formula Nippon) 2011–2019 (TC 2000) 2018–2023 (WTCR)	Qualification / Sprint race	5	4	3	2	1	-	-	-	-	-	-	-	-	-	-	-	-	-	-	-	-	-	-	-	-	-	-	-	-	-	-	-	-
2010–2013 (IndyCar)	Qualification for Indy 500	15	13	12	11	10	9	8	7	6	4	4	4	4	4	4	4	4	4	4	4	4	4	4	4	3	3	3	3	3	3	3	3	3
2012–2021 (GP2/F2)	Sprint race points	15	12	10	8	6	4	2	1	-	-	-	-	-	-	-	-	-	-	-	-	-	-	-	-	-	-	-	-	-	-	-	-	-
2013 (IndyCar)	Qualification race for Iowa round	9	8	7	6	5	4	3	3	2	2	1	1	-	-	-	-	-	-	-	-	-	-	-	-	-	-	-	-	-	-	-	-	-
2014–2015 (IndyCar)	Qualification for Indy 500	33	32	31	30	29	28	27	26	25	24	23	22	21	20	19	18	17	16	15	14	13	12	11	10	9	8	7	6	5	4	3	2	1
2016–2017 (IndyCar)	Qualification for Indy 500	42	40	38	36	34	32	30	28	26	24	23	22	21	20	19	18	17	16	15	14	13	12	11	10	9	8	7	6	5	4	3	2	1
2018–2021 (IndyCar)	Qualification for Indy 500	9	8	7	6	5	4	3	2	1	-	-	-	-	-	-	-	-	-	-	-	-	-	-	-	-	-	-	-	-	-	-	-	-
2022 (WTCR)	Qualification race	10	8	6	4	2	-	-	-	-	-	-	-	-	-	-	-	-	-	-	-	-	-	-	-	-	-	-	-	-	-	-	-	-
2022–2024 (IndyCar)	Qualification for Indy 500	12	11	10	9	8	7	6	5	4	3	2	1	-	-	-	-	-	-	-	-	-	-	-	-	-	-	-	-	-	-	-	-	-
2022–2024 (Formula One)	Sprint race	8	7	6	5	4	3	2	1	-	-	-	-	-	-	-	-	-	-	-	-	-	-	-	-	-	-	-	-	-	-	-	-	-
2022–2024 (Formula 3)	Sprint race	10	9	8	7	6	5	4	3	2	1	-	-	-	-	-	-	-	-	-	-	-	-	-	-	-	-	-	-	-	-	-	-	-
2023 (TCR)	Qualification race	15	10	8	6	4	2	-	-	-	-	-	-	-	-	-	-	-	-	-	-	-	-	-	-	-	-	-	-	-	-	-	-	-
2023 (Moto GP)	Sprint race	12	9	7	6	5	4	3	2	1	-	-	-	-	-	-	-	-	-	-	-	-	-	-	-	-	-	-	-	-	-	-	-	-
PBWC	Points	20	15	12	9	7	5	4	3	2	1	-	-	-	-	-	-	-	-	-	-

=== Shortened races ===
The FIA has introduced special points systems for shortened races for the 2022 Formula One season. Until then, abandoned or shortened races from 1 lap to halfway through the race received half regular points. Most racing series do not have any special scoring systems for this. For example in IndyCar, a race must be driven at least half the planned distance to be included in the championship rankings; there are no special points for shorter races. In NASCAR, the end of Stage 2 or half of the race is the basis for scoring.

Seasons (Series)	Prozentual race distance	1st	2nd	3rd	4th	5th	6th	7th	8th	9th	10th
2022–2024 (F1)	50–74%	19	14	12	9	8	6	5	3	2	1
2022–2024 (F1)	25–49%	13	10	8	6	5	4	3	2	1	-
2022–2024 (F1)	<25%	6	4	3	2	1	-	-	-	-	-

=== Special cases ===
Seasons (Series)	Purpose	1st	2nd	3rd	4th	5th	6th	7th	8th	9th	10th	11th	12th	13th	14th	15th	16th	17th	18th	19th	20th	21st	22nd	23rd	24th	25th	26th	27th	28th	29th	30th	31st	32nd	33rd
1972–1982 (ATCC) 1980–1982 (AUDC)	Bonus points for overall ranking in race in addition to the class rankings	4	3	2	1	-	-	-	-	-	-	-	-	-	-	-	-	-	-	-	-	-	-	-	-	-	-	-	-	-	-	-	-	-
2017–2024 (NASCAR)	Stage points	10	9	8	7	6	5	4	3	2	1	-	-	-	-	-	-	-	-	-	-	-	-	-	-	-	-	-	-	-	-	-	-	-
2017–2024 (NASCAR)	Bonus playoff points for Top 10 regular season points scorers	15	10	8	7	6	5	4	3	2	1	-	-	-	-	-	-	-	-	-	-	-	-	-	-	-	-	-	-	-	-	-	-	-
2018–2023 (Indy Lights / Indy NXT)	Scoring system used for Team Championship	22	18	15	12	10	8	6	4	2	1	1	1	1	1	1	1	1	1	1	1	1	1	1	1	1	1	1	1	1	1	1	1	1
2020–2022 (WTCR)	Scoring system for WTCR Trophy	10	8	5	3	1	-	-	-	-	-	-	-	-	-	-	-	-	-	-	-	-	-	-	-	-	-	-	-	-	-	-	-	-

== Championship decision ==
The final result of the championship is usually determined by the sum of the championship points won. If the points are the same, in most series like Formula One, IndyCar, etc, there is a tiebreaker in the form of the number of the highest positions in the individual races, e.g. number of victories, number of second places etc.

An inverted system was used in Europe before World War II. The driver with the fewest points won the championship there. The winner got 1 "penalty point", the second-placed driver 2, the third-placed driver 3, all other drivers got 4. Drivers who did not finish the race received additional "penalty points", based on the percentage distance they run.

In some racing series, especially in NASCAR, there is a playoff system. After a cutoff race determined at the beginning of the season, the points score is used to qualify for the playoff after that race. In the subsequent races, other selection procedures are used to decide the championship, for example a knockout phase in which only a certain number of drivers, determined by points scoring and number of victories, reach the next round. In the last race, only the direct placement against the other competing drivers decides the outcome of the championship.

== See also ==
- List of motorsport championships

- Auto GP § Scoring system
- Brasileiro de Marcas § Scoring system
- British Formula Ford Championship § Points system
- Euroformula Open Championship § Points system
- FIA Formula Two Championship (2009–2012) § Scoring system
- FIA World Endurance Championship § Format
- GP2 Series § Points system
- List of FIM World Championship points scoring systems
- Porsche Supercup § Driver championship
- Speedway Grand Prix § Event format
- Super Formula Championship § Points scoring system
- Supercars Championship § Points systems
- World Touring Car Championship § Scoring system
- World Touring Car Cup § Scoring system
