= 2016 Stock Car Brasil Championship =

Car racing competition

The 2016 Stock Car Brasil Championship is the thirty-eighth season of the Stock Car Brasil. The season began at Curitiba on March 6 and finished at Interlagos on December 11.

From this season, the league won the seal of Codasur (Automobile Confederation of South America) and will be called the Brazilian Championship and South American Stock Car.

General Motors do Brasil announced the replacement of the Chevrolet Sonic for the New Chevrolet Cruze second generation as the official car of the category teams for the season of 2016 Brazilian and South American Stock Car. The car debut in second round at Velopark

== Teams and drivers ==
Season entries
Manufacturer	Team	No.	Driver	Rounds
Chevrolet Cruze	Red Bull Racing	0	(Brazil) Cacá Bueno	All
Chevrolet Cruze	Red Bull Racing	29	(Brazil) Daniel Serra	All
Chevrolet Cruze	RZ Motorsport	1	(Brazil) Thiago Marques	1
Chevrolet Cruze	RZ Motorsport	11	(Brazil) César Ramos	2, 6–7
Chevrolet Cruze	RZ Motorsport	25	(Brazil) Tuka Rocha	8–12
Chevrolet Cruze	RZ Motorsport	14	(Brazil) Luciano Burti	1–2
Chevrolet Cruze	RZ Motorsport	56	(Brazil) Danilo Dirani	6–9
Chevrolet Cruze	RZ Motorsport	117	(Brazil) Guilherme Salas	10–12
Chevrolet Cruze	C2 Team	4	(Brazil) Júlio Campos	All
Chevrolet Cruze	C2 Team	83	(Brazil) Gabriel Casagrande	All
Chevrolet Cruze	Vogel Motorsport	5	(Brazil) Denis Navarro	All
Chevrolet Cruze	Vogel Motorsport	8	(Brazil) Rafael Suzuki	All
Chevrolet Cruze	TMG Racing	9	(Brazil) Gustavo Lima	All
Chevrolet Cruze	TMG Racing	77	(Brazil) Valdeno Brito	All
Chevrolet Cruze	Shell Racing	10	(Brazil) Ricardo Zonta	All
Chevrolet Cruze	Shell Racing	51	(Brazil) Átila Abreu	All
Chevrolet Cruze	Full Time-ProGP	12	(Brazil) Lucas Foresti	All
Chevrolet Cruze	Full Time-ProGP	66	(Brazil) Felipe Guimarães	1–7
Chevrolet Cruze	Full Time Sports	18	(Brazil) Allam Khodair	All
Chevrolet Cruze	Full Time Sports	111	(Brazil) Rubens Barrichello	All
Chevrolet Cruze	Ipiranga-RCM	21	(Brazil) Thiago Camilo	All
Chevrolet Cruze	Ipiranga-RCM	28	(Brazil) Galid Osman	All
Chevrolet Cruze	Bardahl Hot Car	26	(Brazil) Raphael Abbate	All
Chevrolet Cruze	Bardahl Hot Car	110	(Brazil) Felipe Lapenna	All
Chevrolet Cruze	Eurofarma RC	65	(Brazil) Max Wilson	All
Chevrolet Cruze	Eurofarma RC	90	(Brazil) Ricardo Maurício	All
Peugeot 408	União Química Bassani	3	(Brazil) Bia Figueiredo	All
Peugeot 408	União Química Bassani	70	(Brazil) Diego Nunes	All
Peugeot 408	Mico's Racing	6	(Brazil) Alceu Feldmann	1
Peugeot 408	Mico's Racing	45	(Brazil) Fábio Carbone	1–2
Peugeot 408	Cavaleiro Sports	7	(Brazil) Beto Cavaleiro	1
Peugeot 408	Cavaleiro Sports	73	(Brazil) Sérgio Jimenez	2–12
Peugeot 408	Cavaleiro Sports	74	(Brazil) Popó Bueno	1–8
Peugeot 408	Cavaleiro Sports	99	(Brazil) Xandinho Negrão	9–12
Peugeot 408	Eisenbahn Racing Team	46	(Brazil) Vitor Genz	All
Peugeot 408	Eisenbahn Racing Team	63	(Argentina) Néstor Girolami	All
Peugeot 408	Voxx Racing	80	(Brazil) Marcos Gomes	All
Peugeot 408	Voxx Racing	88	(Brazil) Felipe Fraga	All

First round entries
Team	No	Season driver	Wildcard driver
Red Bull Racing	0	(Brazil) Cacá Bueno	(Brazil) Ricardo Sperafico
Red Bull Racing	29	(Brazil) Daniel Serra	(Brazil) Danilo Dirani
RZ Motorsport	1	(Brazil) Thiago Marques	(Brazil) César Ramos
RZ Motorsport	14	(Brazil) Luciano Burti	(Brazil) Felipe Giaffone
União Química Bassani	3	(Brazil) Bia Figueiredo	(Brazil) Beto Monteiro
União Química Bassani	70	(Brazil) Diego Nunes	(Brazil) Dennis Dirani
Axalta C2 Team	4	(Brazil) Júlio Campos	(Brazil) Alan Hellmeister
Axalta C2 Team	83	(Brazil) Gabriel Casagrande	(Brazil) Márcio Campos
Geolab-Vogel	5	(Brazil) Denis Navarro	(Brazil) Felipe Maluhy
Geolab-Vogel	8	(Brazil) Rafael Suzuki	(Argentina) Franco Vivian
Mico's Racing	6	(Brazil) Alceu Feldmann	(Brazil) Tarso Marques
Mico's Racing	45	(Brazil) Fábio Carbone	(Brazil) Vicente Orige
Cavaleiro Racing	7	(Brazil) Beto Cavaleiro	(Brazil) Sérgio Jimenez
Cavaleiro Racing	74	(Brazil) Popó Bueno	(Brazil) Noberto Gresse
TMG Motorsport	9	(Brazil) Gustavo Lima	(Brazil) Tuka Rocha
TMG Motorsport	77	(Brazil) Valdeno Brito	(Belgium) Maxime Martin
Shell Racing	10	(Brazil) Ricardo Zonta	(Belgium) Laurens Vanthoor
Shell Racing	51	(Brazil) Atila Abreu	(Brazil) Nelson Piquet Jr.
Full Time Sports	18	(Brazil) Allam Khodair	(Portugal) António Félix da Costa
Full Time Sports	111	(Brazil) Rubens Barrichello	(Brazil) Augusto Farfus
Ipiranga-RCM	21	(Brazil) Thiago Camilo	(Brazil) Lucas Di Grassi
Ipiranga-RCM	28	(Brazil) Galid Osman	(Argentina) Damián Fineschi
Hot Car Competições	26	(Brazil) Raphael Abbate	(Brazil) Nicolas Costa
Hot Car Competições	110	(Brazil) Felipe Lapenna	(Brazil) Marco Cozzi
Eisenbahn Racing Team	46	(Brazil) Vítor Genz	(Brazil) David Muffato
Eisenbahn Racing Team	63	(Argentina) Néstor Girolami	(Argentina) Franco Girolami
Full Time-ProGP	12	(Brazil) Lucas Foresti	(Brazil) Luiz Razia
Full Time-ProGP	66	(Brazil) Felipe Guimarães	(Brazil) Duda Pamplona
Eurofarma RC	65	(Brazil) Max Wilson	(Brazil) Vítor Meira
Eurofarma RC	90	(Brazil) Ricardo Maurício	(Brazil) Guilherme Salas
Cimed Racing	80	(Brazil) Marcos Gomes	(Brazil) Antônio Pizzonia
Cimed Racing	88	(Brazil) Felipe Fraga	(Brazil) Rodrigo Sperafico

=== Team changes ===
- After a difficult year in 2015, ProGP entered in 2016 as customer team of Full Time Sports, was renamed to Full Time-ProGP and returned to operate two cars.
- After four years of partnership, Mico's Racing lost the sponsorship of Prati-Donaduzzi and returned to his official name.
- Since 2012 Mobil Super had sponsored AMG Motorsport; in 2016 it sponsors Full Time Sports. The team is now called TMG Motorsport with the acquisition of 100% of corporate shares by Thiago Meneghel.
- Carlos Alves keeps up the sponsorship of Brazil Kirin; the car and team name changed from Schin to Eisenbahn.
- Boettger Competições which in 2003 had a champion with David Muffato left the championship.
- Reigning Champion Voxx Racing changes its name to Cimed Racing, the action is part of the celebrations of 40 years of Cimed Group, team owner and main sponsor since the creation of the team in 2013.

=== Driver changes ===
==== Changed teams ====
- In 2016 Néstor Girolami drove for the Eisenbahn Racing Team and is the first Argentine to compete in the Stock Car the full season and second foreigner to compete in container, the first was the Portuguese Pedro Queiroz Pereira in the seasons 1981 and 1982.
- After seven seasons Atila Abreu left AMG Motorsport and joined Shell Racing.
- Felipe Lapenna returned for Hot Car Competições after one year in Schin Racing Team.
- With the withdrawal of sponsorship of Prati-Donaduzzi of Mico's Racing, Júlio Campos left the team and will compete for your own team C2.
- Vítor Genz left the Boettger Competições and joined Eisenbahn Racing Team.
- Diego Nunes left Vogel Motorsport and returns the União Química Bassani Racing in 2016 for which he raced in 2010, 2011 and 2013.
- Sergio Jimenez left the C2 Team and joined Cavaleirop Racing.
- Rafael Suzuki switched from RZ Motorsport to Vogel Motorsport.
- Gustavo Lima who raced for ProGP part-time in 2015 switched to TMG Motorsport.
- Lucas Foresti and Felipe Guimarães who raced for AMG Motorsport and Boettger Competições in 2015 are driving for Full Time-ProGP in 2016.

==== Entering/re-entering the series ====
- After five seasons, Thiago Marques returned for the series with RZ Motorsport.
- Alceu Feldmann and Fábio Carbone competed only on first round in 2015, who raced for Mico's Racing in 2016.

== Race calendar and results ==
The 2016 schedule was announced on 3 December 2015. The eighth edition of the Corrida do Milhão was held on September 11 at Interlagos. Like last year, the season was contested over twenty-one races at twelve rounds, with the first round being contested by two-driver entries with wildcard drivers. The race with wildcard drivers – the so-called "All Star Race" – was held at Curitiba. The series did not return to the Ribeirão Preto and Campo Grande, but returned to Londrina. Also the series debuted at a new track in Curvelo, called the Circuito dos Cristais. All races were held in Brazil.

Round		Circuit	Date	Pole position	Fastest lap	Winning driver	Winning team
1		(Paraná (state)) Autódromo Internacional de Curitiba	March 6	(Brazil) Ricardo Maurício (Brazil) Guilherme Salas	(Brazil) Thiago Camilo (Brazil) Lucas Di Grassi	(Brazil) Marcos Gomes (Brazil) Antônio Pizzonia	Cimed Racing
2	R1	(Rio Grande do Sul) Velopark, Nova Santa Rita	April 10	(Brazil) Cacá Bueno	(Brazil) Cacá Bueno	(Brazil) Cacá Bueno	Red Bull Racing
2	R2	(Rio Grande do Sul) Velopark, Nova Santa Rita	April 10	(Brazil) Diego Nunes	(Brazil) Thiago Camilo	(Brazil) Diego Nunes	União Química Racing
3	R1	(Goiás) Autódromo Internacional Ayrton Senna (Goiânia), Goiânia	May 22	(Brazil) Cacá Bueno	(Brazil) Cacá Bueno	(Brazil) Marcos Gomes	Cimed Racing
3	R2	(Goiás) Autódromo Internacional Ayrton Senna (Goiânia), Goiânia	May 22	(Brazil) Rafael Suzuki	(Brazil) Ricardo Maurício	(Brazil) Galid Osman	Ipiranga-RCM
4	R1	(Rio Grande do Sul) Autódromo Internacional de Santa Cruz do Sul	June 5	(Brazil) Felipe Fraga	(Brazil) Felipe Fraga	(Brazil) Felipe Fraga	Voxx Racing
4	R2	(Rio Grande do Sul) Autódromo Internacional de Santa Cruz do Sul	June 5	(Brazil) Ricardo Zonta	(Brazil) Diego Nunes	(Brazil) Max Wilson	Eurofarma RC
5	R1	(Rio Grande do Sul) Autódromo Internacional de Tarumã	June 26	(Brazil) Rubens Barrichello	(Brazil) Felipe Fraga	(Brazil) Max Wilson	Eurofarma-RC
5	R2	(Rio Grande do Sul) Autódromo Internacional de Tarumã	June 26	(Brazil) Sérgio Jimenez	(Brazil) Ricardo Mauricio	(Brazil) Júlio Campos	C2 Team
6	R1	(Paraná (state)) Autódromo Internacional de Cascavel	July 17	(Brazil) Cacá Bueno	(Brazil) Marcos Gomes	(Brazil) Cacá Bueno	Red Bull Racing
6	R2	(Paraná (state)) Autódromo Internacional de Cascavel	July 17	(Brazil) Daniel Serra	(Brazil) Marcos Gomes	(Brazil) Rubens Barrichello	Full Time Sports
7		(São Paulo (state)) Interlagos Circuit	September 11	(Brazil) Rubens Barrichello	(Brazil) Júlio Campos	(Brazil) Felipe Fraga	Cimed Racing
8	R1	(Paraná (state)) Autódromo Internacional Ayrton Senna (Londrina), Londrina	September 25	(Brazil) Max Wilson	(Brazil) Marcos Gomes	(Brazil) Felipe Fraga	Cimed Racing
8	R2	(Paraná (state)) Autódromo Internacional Ayrton Senna (Londrina), Londrina	September 25	(Argentina) Néstor Girolami	(Brazil) Rubens Barrichello	(Brazil) Rubens Barrichello	Full Time Sports
9	R1	(Paraná (state)) Autódromo Internacional de Curitiba	October 16	(Brazil) Felipe Fraga	(Brazil) Ricardo Mauricio	(Brazil) Felipe Fraga	Cimed Racing
9	R2	(Paraná (state)) Autódromo Internacional de Curitiba	October 16	(Brazil) Raphael Abbate	(Brazil) Thiago Camilo	(Brazil) Thiago Camilo	Ipiranga-RCM
10	R1	(Goiás) Autódromo Internacional Ayrton Senna (Goiânia), Goiânia	November 6	(Brazil) Rubens Barrichello	(Brazil) Felipe Fraga	(Brazil) Rubens Barrichello	Medley Full Time Sports
10	R2	(Goiás) Autódromo Internacional Ayrton Senna (Goiânia), Goiânia	November 6	(Brazil) Lucas Foresti	(Brazil) Thiago Camilo	(Brazil) Atila Abreu	Shell Racing
11	R1	(Minas Gerais) Circuito dos Cristais	November 20	(Brazil) Felipe Fraga	(Brazil) Marcos Gomes	(Brazil) Felipe Fraga	Cimed Racing
11	R2	(Minas Gerais) Circuito dos Cristais	November 20	(Brazil) Diego Nunes	(Brazil) Marcos Gomes	(Brazil) Ricardo Maurício	Eurofarma-RC
12		(São Paulo (state)) Interlagos Circuit	December 11	(Brazil) Felipe Fraga	(Brazil) Allam Khodair	(Brazil) Daniel Serra	Red Bull Racing

== Championship standings ==
Points system

Points are awarded for each race at an event to the driver/s of a car that completed at least 75% of the race distance and was running at the completion of the race, up to a maximum of 60 points per event.

Points format	Position																			
Points format	1st	2nd	3rd	4th	5th	6th	7th	8th	9th	10th	11th	12th	13th	14th	15th	16th	17th	18th	19th	20th
Dual race	6	5	4	3	2	1	0													
Feature races	30	25	22	20	19	18	17	16	15	14	13	12	11	10	9	8	7	5	3	1
Sprint races	15	13	12	11	10	9	8	7	6	5	4	3	2	1	0					
Final race	60	50	44	40	38	36	34	32	30	28	26	24	22	20	18	16	14	10	6	2

- Dual Race: Used for the first round with Wildcard drivers.
- Feature races: Used for the first race of each event and the Stock Car Million race.
- Sprint races: Used for the second race of each event, with partially reversed (top ten) grid.
- Final race: Used for the last round of the season with double points.

=== Drivers' Championship ===
Pos	Driver	CUR1	VEL		GOI1		SCZ		TAR		CAS		INT1	LON		CUR2		GOI2		CRI		INT2	Pts
1	(Brazil) Felipe Fraga	16	4	4	12	2	**1**	15	2	Ret	8	9	1	1	12	**1**	14	2	18†	**1**	16	**10**	310
2	(Brazil) Rubens Barrichello	20†	6	5	11	3	21	2	**17†**	11	17	1	**2**	6	1	11	2	**1**	5	3	22†	2	295
3	(Brazil) Daniel Serra	4	2	6	19	Ret	3	12	4	13	10	**21†**	8	20	Ret	4	13	7	15	Ret	3	1	229
4	(Brazil) Valdeno Brito	22†	9	2	3	17	24†	13	5	12	6	7	3	2	14	5	20†	3	20†	Ret	4	9	229
5	(Brazil) Marcos Gomes	1	3	14	1	16	4	DSQ	3	Ret	25†	4	Ret	4	10	21†	Ret	4	7	2	10	15	213
6	(Brazil) Ricardo Maurício	**3**	22†	DNS	2	15	5	6	6	21	19	11†	DSQ	3	8	2	18	Ret	DNS	12	1	3	207
7	(Brazil) Diego Nunes	9	10	**1**	17	7	13	DSQ	18†	7	3	Ret	6	8	11	24†	Ret	5	3	10	**14**	16	190
8	(Brazil) Átila Abreu	6	8	3	6	18	6	10	14	10	24†	DNS	20†	14	2	17	21†	9	1	5	13	14	187
9	(Brazil) Cacá Bueno	Ret	**1**	11	**20**	6	18	7	20	5	**1**	12	18†	7	15	8	15	22†	Ret	16	24†	4	186
10	(Brazil) Allam Khodair	2	Ret	9	Ret	8	2	Ret	Ret	3	18	2	5	13	6	3	12	Ret	DNS	4	23†	12	181
11	(Brazil) Júlio Campos	Ret	Ret	16	9	Ret	11	Ret	Ret	1	Ret	3	7	Ret	Ret	6	Ret	6	19†	7	8	5	170
12	(Brazil) Max Wilson	18	5	Ret	4	19	22	1	1	16	5	8	4	**22†**	9	Ret	3	21†	4	Ret	7	Ret	167
13	(Brazil) Vitor Genz	7	11	23	5	20	8	18†	8	18	4	18	10	Ret	3	15	4	12	8	Ret	6	22	158
14	(Brazil) Galid Osman	11	Ret	DNS	14	1	17	5	19	9	21	6	14	11	Ret	19†	5	16	6	9	DNS	17	142
15	(Brazil) Thiago Camilo	14	Ret	8	13	5	19	Ret	Ret	2	15	13†	17†	15	4	22†	1	13	2	6	15	Ret	141
16	(Brazil) Ricardo Zonta	5	14	DNS	16	4	10	**9**	Ret	8	2	10	22†	Ret	5	14	Ret	Ret	DSQ	DSQ	DNS	13	130
17	(Brazil) Rafael Suzuki	10	15	10	10	**21**	16	8	DSQ	EX	7	14	Ret	Ret	Ret	20	11	19	12	13	20	7	117
18	(Brazil) Denis Navarro	12	7	7	15	12	DSQ	Ret	13	Ret	Ret	Ret	Ret	23†	7	18	6	Ret	14	17	5	11	114
19	(Brazil) Gustavo Lima	Ret	Ret	22	22†	9	14	16	11	14	12	16	Ret	17	Ret	13	17	18	9	14	18	8	113
20	(Brazil) Sérgio Jimenez	Ret*	18	Ret	8	Ret	9	17†	10	**Ret**	9	19†	19†	5	13	Ret	7	Ret	11	15	21	23	110
21	(Brazil) Gabriel Casagrande	Ret	16	18	Ret	DNS	7	14	15	4	Ret	Ret	9	Ret	Ret	Ret	10	17	Ret	8	17	Ret	89
22	(Argentina) Néstor Girolami	Ret	21	15	Ret	10	Ret	DNS	Ret	Ret	11	Ret	16	10	**Ret**	16	8	8	23†	Ret	9	Ret	77
23	(Brazil) Raphael Abbate	23†	Ret	21	21†	DNS	20	4	Ret	17	13	17	12	9	18†	10	**Ret**	Ret	DNS	Ret	12	DSQ	67
24	(Brazil) Lucas Foresti	8	19	19	Ret	Ret	12	11	9	20	Ret	20†	Ret	Ret	Ret	7	Ret	10	**22**	Ret	Ret	20	67
25	(Brazil) Tuka Rocha	Ret*												16	16	9	16	11	16	18	2	19	60
26	(Brazil) Bia Figueiredo	Ret	17	24	18	14	23†	DNS	16	6	23	Ret	13	21	17	Ret	19†	15	21†	19	11	Ret	57
27	(Brazil) Guilherme Salas	**3***																20	10	11	19	6	55
28	(Brazil) Felipe Guimarães	21†	12	Ret	7	22†	Ret	3	Ret	19	22	5											51
29	(Brazil) Felipe Lapenna	13	Ret	12	Ret	13	Ret	Ret	7	15	20	Ret	11	19	Ret	23†	Ret	Ret	13	21†	DNS	18	51
30	(Brazil) Popó Bueno	17	20	17	Ret	11	15	Ret	12	Ret	16	Ret	23†	12	Ret								46
31	(Brazil) Danilo Dirani	4*									14	15	15	18	Ret	25†	9						30
32	(Brazil) Xandinho Negrão															12	Ret	14	17	20	25†	21	23
33	(Brazil) Luciano Burti	Ret	13	20																			11
34	(Brazil) Fábio Carbone	15	23†	13																			2
	(Brazil) Alceu Feldmann	19																					0
	(Brazil) César Ramos	Ret*	Ret	DNS							Ret	Ret	21†										0
	(Brazil) Beto Cavaleiro	Ret																					0
	(Brazil) Thiago Marques	Ret																					0
Guest drivers ineligible to score points
	(Brazil) Antônio Pizzonia	1																					
	(Portugal) António Félix da Costa	2																					
	(Belgium) Laurens Vanthoor	5																					
	(Brazil) Nelson Piquet Jr.	6																					
	(Brazil) David Muffato	7																					
	(Brazil) Luiz Razia	8																					
	(Brazil) Dennis Dirani	9																					
	(Argentina) Franco Vivian	10																					
	(Argentina) Damián Fineschi	11																					
	(Brazil) Felipe Maluhy	12																					
	(Brazil) Marco Cozzi	13																					
	(Brazil) Lucas di Grassi	14																					
	(Brazil) Vicente Orige	15																					
	(Brazil) Rodrigo Sperafico	16																					
	(Brazil) Norberto Gresse	17																					
	(Brazil) Vítor Meira	18																					
	(Brazil) Tarso Marques	19																					
	(Brazil) Augusto Farfus	20†																					
	(Brazil) Duda Pamplona	21†																					
	(Belgium) Maxime Martin	22†																					
	(Brazil) Nicolas Costa	23†																					
	(Brazil) Allan Heillmeister	Ret																					
	(Brazil) Ricardo Sperafico	Ret																					
	(Brazil) Márcio Campos	Ret																					
	(Brazil) Beto Monteiro	Ret																					
	(Brazil) Felipe Giaffone	Ret																					
	(Argentina) Franco Girolami	Ret																					
Pos	Driver	CUR1	VEL		GOI1		SCZ		TAR		CAS		INT1	LON		CUR2		GOI2		CRI		INT2	Pts

Colour	Result
Gold	Winner
Silver	Second place
Bronze	Third place
Green	Points classification
Blue	Non-points classification
Blue	Non-classified finish (NC)
Purple	Retired, not classified (Ret)
Red	Did not qualify (DNQ)
Red	Did not pre-qualify (DNPQ)
Black	Disqualified (DSQ)
White	Did not start (DNS)
White	Withdrew (WD)
White	Race cancelled (C)
Blank	Did not practice (DNP)
Blank	Did not arrive (DNA)
Blank	Excluded (EX)

**Bold** – Pole position
Italics – Fastest lap
† – Retired, but classified

- * –Inegible to score points in first round.
