= 2017 Brasileiro de Marcas =

Motorsport season

The 2017 Campeonato Brasileiro de Marcas season was the seventh season of the Brasileiro de Marcas.

== Teams and drivers ==
Team	Car	No.	Drivers	Rounds
RZ RCHLO Racing	Toyota Corolla	1	(Brazil) Thiago Marques	1
RZ RCHLO Racing	Toyota Corolla	33	(Brazil) Patrick Choate	1
RZ RCHLO Racing	Renault Fluence	1	(Brazil) Thiago Marques	2–8
RZ RCHLO Racing	Renault Fluence	33	(Brazil) Patrick Choate	2–8
RF Motorsport	Ford Focus	2	(Brazil) Thiago Messias	1
RF Motorsport	Ford Focus	10	(Brazil) Humberto Beisuz	7–8
RF Motorsport	Ford Focus	85	(Brazil) Enzo Bortoletto	1–4
Salmini Paraguay Racing	Toyota Corolla	3	(Brazil) Luiz Santos	2–4
Salmini Paraguay Racing	Toyota Corolla	3	(Brazil) Thiago Klein	2–5
Salmini Paraguay Racing	Toyota Corolla	3	(Brazil) Ricardo Gargiulo	5
Salmini Paraguay Racing	Toyota Corolla	15	(Brazil) Ricardo Gargiulo	8
Salmini Paraguay Racing	Toyota Corolla	21	(Brazil) Elias Azevedo	2, 4
Salmini Paraguay Racing	Toyota Corolla	22	(Brazil) Gabriel Lusquiños	3
Salmini Paraguay Racing	Toyota Corolla	44	(Brazil) Luiz Arruda	5
Salmini Paraguay Racing	Toyota Corolla	54	(Brazil) Alexandre Andrade Jr.	6
Desenfreados Racing Team	Ford Focus	6	(Brazil) José Roberto Hofig	1–4
Desenfreados Racing Team	Ford Focus	66	(Brazil) Enrico Bucci	All
Desenfreados Racing Team	Ford Focus	99	(Brazil) Cesar Bonilha	5–6
Desenfreados Racing Team	Renault Fluence	99	(Brazil) Cesar Bonilha	7–8
Onze Motorsport	Chevrolet Cruze	11	(Brazil) Nonô Figueiredo	All
Onze Motorsport	Chevrolet Cruze	12	(Brazil) Márcio Basso	1–2, 5–8
Onze Motorsport	Chevrolet Cruze	21	(Brazil) Elias Azevedo	3
Onze Motorsport	Chevrolet Cruze	37	(Brazil) Guilherme Reischl	4
JLM Racing	Chevrolet Cruze	17	(Brazil) Daniel Kaefer	3–4
JLM Racing	Chevrolet Cruze	27	(Brazil) Renan Guerra	1–2
JLM Racing	Chevrolet Cruze	43	(Brazil) Vicente Orige	All
JLM Racing	Chevrolet Cruze	57	(Brazil) Felipe Tozzo	5–8
JLM Sport	Chevrolet Cruze	28	(Brazil) Carlos SG Souza	All
JLM Sport	Chevrolet Cruze	36	(Brazil) Pedro Boesel	All
PGG Paraguay Racing	Toyota Corolla	3	(Brazil) Thiago Klein	6–8
PGG Paraguay Racing	Toyota Corolla	21	(Brazil) Elias Azevedo	5
PGG Paraguay Racing	Toyota Corolla	57	(Brazil) Felipe Tozzo	1–4
PGG Paraguay Racing	Toyota Corolla	74	(Paraguay) Odair dos Santos	All
PGG Paraguay Racing	Toyota Corolla	74	(Brazil) Luiz Santos	1

- After six seasons and eleven titles (titles between brands, teams and drivers), Honda announces its departure in the Copa Petrobrás de Marcas in 2017

== Race calendar and results ==
The 2017 schedule was announced on 22 December 2016.

Round		Circuit	Date	Pole Position	Fastest lap	Winning driver	Winning team
1	R1	(Rio Grande do Sul) Velopark, Nova Santa Rita	22 April	(Brazil) Vicente Orige	(Brazil) Vicente Orige	(Brazil) Vicente Orige	JLM Racing
1	R2	(Rio Grande do Sul) Velopark, Nova Santa Rita	23 April		(Brazil) Renan Guerra	(Brazil) Renan Guerra	JLM Racing
2	R1	(Rio Grande do Sul) Autódromo Internacional de Santa Cruz do Sul	20 May	(Brazil) Nonô Figueiredo	(Brazil) Vicente Orige	(Brazil) Pedro Boesel	JLM Sport
2	R2	(Rio Grande do Sul) Autódromo Internacional de Santa Cruz do Sul	21 May		(Brazil) Vicente Orige	(Brazil) Nonô Figueiredo	Onze Motorsport
3	R1	(Paraná (state)) Autódromo Internacional de Cascavel	10 July	(Brazil) Daniel Kaefer	(Brazil) Daniel Kaefer	(Brazil) Daniel Kaefer	JLM Racing
3	R2	(Paraná (state)) Autódromo Internacional de Cascavel	11 July		(Brazil) Carlos SG Souza	(Brazil) Carlos SG Souza	JLM Sport
4	R1	(Paraná (state)) Autódromo Internacional de Curitiba	1 July	(Brazil) Nonô Figueiredo	(Brazil) Nonô Figueiredo	(Brazil) Vicente Orige	JLM Racing
4	R2	(Paraná (state)) Autódromo Internacional de Curitiba	2 July		(Brazil) Vicente Orige	(Brazil) Daniel Kaefer	JLM Racing
5	R1	(São Paulo (state)) Autódromo Velo Città	5 August	(Brazil) Vicente Orige	(Brazil) Vicente Orige	(Brazil) Vicente Orige	JLM Racing
5	R2	(São Paulo (state)) Autódromo Velo Città	6 August		(Brazil) Vicente Orige	(Brazil) Nonô Figueiredo	Onze Motorsport
6	R1	(Rio Grande do Sul) Autódromo Internacional de Tarumã	21 October	(Brazil) Pedro Boesel	(Brazil) Pedro Boesel	(Brazil) Pedro Boesel	JLM Sport
6	R2	(Rio Grande do Sul) Autódromo Internacional de Tarumã	22 October		(Brazil) Nonô Figueiredo	(Brazil) Nonô Figueiredo	Onze Motorsport
7	R1	(Goiás) Autódromo Internacional Ayrton Senna (Goiânia)	18 November	(Brazil) Carlos SG Souza	(Brazil) Carlos SG Souza	(Brazil) Thiago Marques	RZ RCHLO Racing
7	R2	(Goiás) Autódromo Internacional Ayrton Senna (Goiânia)	19 November		(Brazil) Carlos SG Souza	(Brazil) Thiago Marques	RZ RCHLO Racing
8	R1	(São Paulo (state)) Autódromo José Carlos Pace	9 December	(Brazil) Nonô Figueiredo	(Brazil) Nonô Figueiredo	(Brazil) Thiago Marques	RZ RCHLO Racing
8	R2	(São Paulo (state)) Autódromo José Carlos Pace	10 December		(Brazil) Vicente Orige	(Brazil) Carlos SG Souza	JLM Sport

== Championship standings ==
Points system

Points are awarded for each race at an event to the driver/s of a car that completed at least 75% of the race distance and was running at the completion of the race.

Points format	Position														
Points format	1st	2nd	3rd	4th	5th	6th	7th	8th	9th	10th	11th	12th	13th	14th	15th
Race	23	20	18	16	14	12	10	8	7	6	5	4	3	2	1
Final round	35	30	27	24	21	18	15	12	11	9	8	6	4	3	2

- Race: Used for the first and second race, with partially reversed (top eight) of each event.
- Final round: Used for the final round of the season with double points.

=== Drivers' Championship ===
Pos	Driver	VEL		SCZ		CAS		CUR		VCT		TAR		GOI		INT		Pts
1	(Brazil) Vicente Orige	**1**	8	Ret	2	2	2	1	8	**1**	2	3	Ret	3	2	2	3	278
2	(Brazil) Nonô Figueiredo	2	2	**2**	1	3	6	**2**	4	2	1	8	**1**	8	**8**	**11**	4	271
3	(Brazil) Thiago Marques	3	9	Ret	6	6	Ret	3	2	4	3	5	3	1	1	1	2	264
4	(Brazil) Felipe Tozzo	8	**3**	3	4	8	**4**	4	3	DSQ	4	2	9	9	5	3	8	221
5	(Brazil) Pedro Boesel	4	Ret	1	5	5	Ret	13	5	Ret	9	1	4	**4**	4	4	Ret	186
6	(Brazil) Carlos SG Souza	7	Ret	5	Ret	4	1	5	Ret	8	**5**	DNS	DNS	2	Ret	5	1	175
7	(Paraguay) Odair dos Santos	Ret	6	Ret	Ret	12	5	6	6	3	6	7	5	7	6	10	Ret	139
8	(Brazil) Thiago Klein			9	8	DSQ	7	12	9	Ret	Ret	4	2	11	3	5	9	124
9	(Brazil) Marcio Basso	9	7	6	10					5	8	Ret	6	5	9	7	Ret	105
10	(Brazil) Enrico Bucci	13	Ret	DSQ	Ret	7	3	10	Ret	Ret	12	Ret	DNS	6	Ret	9	5	86
11	(Brazil) Patrick Choate	11	Ret	7	Ret	13	9	DNS	10	7	11	Ret	8	12	10	8	**10**	85
12	(Brazil) Enzo Bortoleto	5	4	5	3	Ret	DNS	Ret	Ret									64
13	(Brazil) Daniel Kaefer					**1**	DSQ	8	**1**									54
14	(Brazil) Cesar Bonilha									DNS	DNS	6	7	13	7	Ret	6	53
15	(Brazil) Elias Azevedo			Ret	7	11	8	7	7	Ret	7							53
16	(Brazil) Roberto Hofig	10	5	8	**9**	10	10	11	Ret									52
17	(Brazil) Luis Santos	Ret	6	9	8	DSQ	7	12	9									48
18	(Brazil) Renan Guerra	6	1	Ret	11													40
19	(Brazil) Luiz Arruda									6	10							18
20	(Brazil) Ricardo Gargulio									Ret	DNS					DNS	7	15
21	(Brazil) Humberto Beisuz													10	Ret	DNS	11	14
22=	(Brazil) Gabriel Lusquiños					9	11											12
22=	(Brazil) Guilherme Reischl							9	11									12
	(Brazil) Thiago Messias	DNS	Ret															0
	(Brazil) Alexandre Andrade Jr.											Ret	DNS					0
Pos	Driver	VEL		SCZ		CAS		CUR		VCT		TAR		GOI		INT		Pts

Colour	Result
Gold	Winner
Silver	Second place
Bronze	Third place
Green	Points classification
Blue	Non-points classification
Blue	Non-classified finish (NC)
Purple	Retired, not classified (Ret)
Red	Did not qualify (DNQ)
Red	Did not pre-qualify (DNPQ)
Black	Disqualified (DSQ)
White	Did not start (DNS)
White	Withdrew (WD)
White	Race cancelled (C)
Blank	Did not practice (DNP)
Blank	Did not arrive (DNA)
Blank	Excluded (EX)

**Bold** – Pole position
Italics – Fastest lap
† – Retired, but classified
