= 2018 Brasileiro de Marcas =

Car racing competition

The 2018 Campeonato Brasileiro de Marcas season was the eighth and final season of the Brasileiro de Marcas.

== Teams and drivers ==
Team	Car	No.	Drivers	Rounds
Salmini Racing	Toyota Corolla	1	(Brazil) Nicolas Salmini	1
Salmini Racing	Toyota Corolla	2	(Brazil) Leonardo Cruz	1
Blau Motorsport	Chevrolet Cruze	3	(Brazil) Rafael Iserhard	3, 6
Blau Motorsport	Chevrolet Cruze	12	(Brazil) Marcio Basso	2
Blau Motorsport	Chevrolet Cruze	14	(Brazil) Junior Victorette	4, 6
Blau Motorsport	Chevrolet Cruze	37	(Brazil) Guilherme Reischl	2–5, 7–8
Max Power Racing	Renault Fluence	4	(Brazil) Raphael Campos	3
Max Power Racing	Renault Fluence	8	(Brazil) Eduardo Serratto	1
Max Power Racing	Renault Fluence	13	(Brazil) André Bragantini Jr.	1
Max Power Racing	Renault Fluence	27	(Brazil) Luiz Gustavo Turmina	3
Max Power Racing	Renault Fluence	31	(Brazil) Higor Hoffmann	2
Max Power Racing	Renault Fluence	55	(Egypt) Ayman Darwich	2
JLM Racing	Chevrolet Cruze	4	(Brazil) Raphael Campos	1–2
JLM Racing	Chevrolet Cruze	10	(Brazil) Humberto Biesuz	2–5, 7–8
JLM Racing	Chevrolet Cruze	43	(Brazil) Vicente Orige	1–5, 7–8
JLM Racing	Chevrolet Cruze	74	(Paraguay) Odair dos Santos	6–8
Desenfreados Racing Team	Ford Focus	6	(Brazil) José Roberto Hofig	1–3, 5–8
Desenfreados Racing Team	Ford Focus	33	(Brazil) Pablo Alves	4
Desenfreados Racing Team	Ford Focus	99	(Brazil) Cesar Bonilha	4–8
Desenfreados Racing Team	Renault Fluence	66	(Brazil) Enrico Bucci	All
Brandão Motorsport	Ford Focus	7	(Brazil) Alan Carvalho	4
Brandão Motorsport	Ford Focus	29	(Brazil) Miro Cruz	4
JLM Sports	Chevrolet Cruze	12	(Brazil) Marcio Basso	1
JLM Sports	Chevrolet Cruze	37	(Brazil) Guilherme Reischl	1
JLM Sports	Chevrolet Cruze	74	(Paraguay) Odair dos Santos	1

== Race calendar and results ==
All races were held in Brazil.

Round		Circuit	Date	Pole position	Fastest lap	Winning driver	Winning team
1	R1	Autódromo Internacional de Curitiba	April 7	(Brazil) Vicente Orige	(Brazil) Vicente Orige	(Brazil) Raphael Campos	JLM Racing
1	R2	Autódromo Internacional de Curitiba	April 8		(Brazil) Vicente Orige	(Brazil) Vicente Orige	JLM Racing
2	R1	Velopark, Nova Santa Rita	April 21	(Brazil) Vicente Orige	(Brazil) Vicente Orige	(Brazil) Vicente Orige	JLM Racing
2	R2	Velopark, Nova Santa Rita	April 22		(Brazil) Vicente Orige	(Brazil) Vicente Orige	JLM Racing
3	R1	Autódromo Internacional de Santa Cruz do Sul	May 19	(Brazil) Vicente Orige	(Brazil) Rafael Iserhard	(Brazil) Vicente Orige	JLM Racing
3	R2	Autódromo Internacional de Santa Cruz do Sul	May 20	Race cancelled due to weather conditions			
4	R1	Autódromo Internacional Ayrton Senna (Goiânia)	August 4	(Brazil) Vicente Orige	(Brazil) Cesar Bonilha	(Brazil) Vicente Orige	JLM Racing
4	R2	Autódromo Internacional Ayrton Senna (Goiânia)	August 5		(Brazil) Cesar Bonilha	(Brazil) Cesar Bonilha	Desenfreados Racing Team
5	R1	Autódromo Internacional Orlando Moura	August 18	(Brazil) Vicente Orige	(Brazil) Guilherme Reischl	(Brazil) Vicente Orige	JLM Racing
5	R2	Autódromo Internacional Orlando Moura	August 19		(Brazil) Cesar Bonilha	(Brazil) Vicente Orige	JLM Racing
6	R1	Autódromo Internacional de Cascavel	September 8	(Paraguay) Odair dos Santos	(Paraguay) Odair dos Santos	(Paraguay) Odair dos Santos	JLM Racing
6	R2	Autódromo Internacional de Cascavel	September 9		(Paraguay) Odair dos Santos	(Paraguay) Odair dos Santos	JLM Racing
7	R1	Autódromo Internacional Ayrton Senna (Goiânia)	November 3	(Paraguay) Odair dos Santos	(Paraguay) Odair dos Santos	(Paraguay) Odair dos Santos	JLM Racing
7	R2	Autódromo Internacional Ayrton Senna (Goiânia)	November 4		(Brazil) Vicente Orige	(Brazil) Vicente Orige	JLM Racing
8	R1	Autódromo José Carlos Pace	December 8	(Brazil) Vicente Orige	(Brazil) Enrico Bucci	(Brazil) Vicente Orige	JLM Racing
8	R2	Autódromo José Carlos Pace	December 9		(Brazil) Vicente Orige	(Brazil) Vicente Orige	JLM Racing

== Championship standings ==
Points system

Points are awarded for each race at an event to the driver/s of a car that completed at least 75% of the race distance and was running at the completion of the race.

Points format	Position														
Points format	1st	2nd	3rd	4th	5th	6th	7th	8th	9th	10th	11th	12th	13th	14th	15th
Race	23	20	18	16	14	12	10	8	7	6	5	4	3	2	1
Final round	35	30	27	24	21	18	15	12	11	9	8	6	4	3	2

- Race: Used for the first and second race, with partially reversed (top eight) of each event.
- Final round: Used for the final round of the season with double points.

=== Drivers' Championship ===
Pos	Driver	CUR		VEL		SCZ		GOI		MS		CAS		GOI		INT		Pts
1	(Brazil) Vicente Orige	**6**	1	**1**	1	**1**	C	**1**	DNS	**1**	1			2	1	**1**	1	286
2	(Brazil) Guilherme Reischl	3	4	6	2	2	C	3	3	4	3			6	6	3	2	237
3	(Brazil) Enrico Bucci	2	Ret	2	3	7	C	Ret	DNS	Ret	2	Ret	3	5	2	2	Ret	170
4	(Brazil) Humberto Biesuz			7	5	6	C	Ret	2	2	5			3	4	4	Ret	148
5	(Brazil) Cesar Bonilha							2	1	3	Ret	3	2	Ret	3	6	Ret	135
6	(Brazil) Roberto Hofig	5	5	8	Ret	4	C			5	4	4	Ret	4	5	Ret	Ret	128
7	(Paraguay) Odair dos Santos	DNS	Ret									**1**	1	**1**	Ret	5	3	117
8	(Brazil) Raphael Campos	1	3	5	Ret	3	C											73
9	(Brazil) Marcio Basso	4	2	4	4													68
10	(Brazil) Junior Victorette							4	6			5	4					58
11	(Brazil) Rafael Iserhard					5	C					2	Ret					34
12=	(Brazil) Alan Carvalho							6	5									26
12=	(Brazil) Pablo Alves							7	4									26
14	(Brazil) Higor Hoffmann			3	Ret													18
15	(Brazil) Miro Cruz							5	DSQ									14
16	(Egypt) Ayman Darwich			Ret	6													12
	(Brazil) Eduardo Serratto	Ret	Ret															0
	(Brazil) Nicolas Salmini	Ret	Ret															0
	(Brazil) Leonardo Cruz	Ret	Ret															0
	(Brazil) André Bragantini	DNS	Ret															0
	(Brazil) Luiz Gustavo Turmina					Ret	C											0
Pos	Driver	CUR		VEL		SCZ		GOI		MS		CAS		GOI		INT		Pts

Colour	Result
Gold	Winner
Silver	Second place
Bronze	Third place
Green	Points classification
Blue	Non-points classification
Blue	Non-classified finish (NC)
Purple	Retired, not classified (Ret)
Red	Did not qualify (DNQ)
Red	Did not pre-qualify (DNPQ)
Black	Disqualified (DSQ)
White	Did not start (DNS)
White	Withdrew (WD)
White	Race cancelled (C)
Blank	Did not practice (DNP)
Blank	Did not arrive (DNA)
Blank	Excluded (EX)

**Bold** – Pole position
Italics – Fastest lap
† – Retired, but classified
