= 1980 Stock Car Brasil season =

Car racing competition

Seasons
- ← 1979 1981 →

The 1980 Stock Car Brasil Championship was the second iteration of the Stock Car Brasil Championship. The season would begin at the Autódromo Internacional de Tarumã on April 20 and would conclude at the Interlagos Circuit on October 12.

The season was won by Ingo Hoffmann. It would be his first of twelve Stock Car Brasil championship titles; the last of which would be won 22 years later in 2002.

== Calendar ==
The following circuits hosted at least one round of the 1980 championship.

Round	Circuit (Event)	Dates	Map
1	Autódromo Internacional de Tarumã; Viamão, Rio Grande do Sul	April 20	1980 Stock Car Brasil season is located in Brazil
2	(Rio de Janeiro (state)) Autódromo de Jacarepaguá; Jacarepaguá, Rio de Janeiro	May 11	1980 Stock Car Brasil season is located in Brazil
3	Autódromo Internacional de Guaporé; Guaporé, Rio Grande do Sul	May 25	1980 Stock Car Brasil season is located in Brazil
4	(Federal District (Brazil)) Autódromo Internacional de Brasília; Brasília, Distrito Federal	June 8	1980 Stock Car Brasil season is located in Brazil
5	Autódromo Internacional de Goiânia; Goiânia, Goiás	June 22	1980 Stock Car Brasil season is located in Brazil
6	(Paraná (state)) Autódromo Internacional de Cascavel; Cascavel, Paraná	July 27	1980 Stock Car Brasil season is located in Brazil
7	(Paraná (state)) Autódromo Internacional de Curitiba; Curitiba, Paraná	August 10	1980 Stock Car Brasil season is located in Brazil
8	(São Paulo (state)) Autódromo de Interlagos; São Paulo, São Paulo	September 14	1980 Stock Car Brasil season is located in Brazil
9	(São Paulo (state)) Autódromo de Interlagos; São Paulo, São Paulo	October 12	1980 Stock Car Brasil season is located in Brazil

== Teams and drivers ==
All teams and drivers were Brazilian-registered. All entrants ran the Chevrolet Opala car.

Entrant	Tire	No.	Driver	Rounds
Spinelli Racing	C	5	Antônio Carlos Avallone	2–7, 9
Spinelli Racing	C	11	Walter Spinelli	All
Spinelli Racing	C	19	Olimpio Alencar Jr.	All
Giaffone Motorsport	M	10	Affonso Giaffone Jr.	All
Giaffone Motorsport	M	31	José Carlos Giaffone	All
Equipe Johnson	P	17	Ingo Hoffmann	All
Equipe Johnson	P		Jayme Figueiredo	All
Equipe Coca-Cola Brasil/Polwax	C	22	Paulo Gomes	All
Equipe Coca-Cola Brasil/Polwax	C		Sylvio de Barros	2
Equipe Havoline-Texaco	P	27	João Carlos Palhares	All
Equipe Havoline-Texaco	P	67	Marcos Gracia	1, 3–6
Castrol Racing	M	55	José Catanhede	1–3, 6, 9
Castrol Racing	M		Ricardo Baptista	1, 3–4, 7
WB Motorsports	M	62	Luiz Alberto Pereira	All
WB Motorsports	M	186	Marcos Troncon	All
Valvoline Team	C	64	Joannis Likoroupoulos	1–3, 5–9
Valvoline Team	C		Roberto Fontanari	4, 7
Águia Autosport	M	77	Aloysio Andrade Filho	1–6, 8
Ashford Motorsports	P	88	José Luiz Nogueira	1
Team Metalpó	B		Antonio Castro Prado	1–2, 5–7, 9
Team Metalpó	B		Fernando Tradt	3, 7
Boettger Competições	C		Carlos Drumond	1, 6
Boettger Competições	C		Márcio Mauro	4
Bastos Racing Team	C		Armando Balbi	5–8
San Philipo/Objetivo Competições	P		Mauro Turcatel	1, 5, 9
Camel Grand Prix	C		João Correa	All
Camel Grand Prix	C		Reinaldo Campello	3–9
Action/Sultox-Sulpesca Racing	P		Luis Carlos Sansone	1–2, 4–5, 7
Action/Sultox-Sulpesca Racing	P		Pedro Carneiro Pereira	4–6, 9
Benson & Hedges Racing	C		Julio Tedesco	2–3, 7
Chesterfield Racing	B		René de Nigris	1–6, 8–9
Chesterfield Racing	B		Sidney Alves	4–5, 7–8
Renner Racing	B		Paulo Valiengo	5–7
Renner Racing	B		Luiz Aladino Osorio	1, 5, 9
Kohlbach Engineering	P		Ricardo Fontanari	1, 4, 8
Oxigeral GP	C		Zeca Giaffone	All
Oxigeral GP	C		Edgar Mello Filho	9
Caster Competições	P		Chico Serra	1, 3–9
Molas Hoesch Team	B		Rodrigo Mello	1, 9
Trefitec	M		Leonardo Sánchez	2, 6
Team Metalpó-Combustol	P		Alfredo Guaraná Menezes	3, 9
Óleo Lorga Racing	G		Guilherme Mottur	3, 6

== Results and standings ==
=== Season summary ===
Round	Circuit	Date	Pole position	Fastest lap	Winning driver	Winning team
1	(Rio Grande do Sul) Tarumã	20 April	(Brazil) Olimpio Alencar Jr.	(Brazil) Ingo Hoffmann	(Brazil) Olimpio Alencar Jr.	Spinelli Racing
2	(Rio de Janeiro (state)) Jacarepaguá	11 May	(Brazil) Paulo Gomes	(Brazil) Paulo Gomes	(Brazil) João Carlos Palhares	Equipe Havoline-Texaco
3	(Rio Grande do Sul) Guaporé	25 May	(Brazil) Paulo Gomes	(Brazil) João Carlos Palhares	(Brazil) Ingo Hoffmann	Equipe Johnson
4	(Federal District (Brazil)) Brasília	8 June	(Brazil) Ingo Hoffmann	(Brazil) Ingo Hoffmann	(Brazil) Olimpio Alencar Jr.	Spinelli Racing
5	(Goiás) Goiânia	22 June	(Brazil) Ingo Hoffmann	(Brazil) Ingo Hoffmann	(Brazil) Ingo Hoffmann	Equipe Johnson
6	(Paraná (state)) Cascavel	27 July	(Brazil) Reinaldo Campello	(Brazil) Paulo Gomes	(Brazil) Reinaldo Campello	Camel Grand Prix
7	(Paraná (state)) Curitiba	10 August	(Brazil) Ingo Hoffmann	(Brazil) Affonso Giaffone Jr.	(Brazil) Ingo Hoffmann	Equipe Johnson
8	(São Paulo (state)) Interlagos	14 September	(Brazil) Ingo Hoffmann	(Brazil) Ingo Hoffmann	(Brazil) Ingo Hoffmann	Equipe Johnson
9	(São Paulo (state)) Interlagos	12 October	(Brazil) Olimpio Alencar Jr.	(Brazil) Olimpio Alencar Jr.	(Brazil) Zeca Giaffone	Oxigeral GP

=== Championship standings ===
Pos	Driver	(Rio Grande do Sul) TAR	(Rio de Janeiro (state)) RIO	(Rio Grande do Sul) GUA	(Federal District (Brazil)) BRA	(Goiás) GOI	(Paraná (state)) CAS	(Paraná (state)) CUR	(São Paulo (state)) INT1	(São Paulo (state)) INT2	Pts
1	(Brazil) Ingo Hoffmann	**12**	**2**	**1**	6	1	10	**1**	**1**	3	234
2	(Brazil) Olimpio Alencar Jr.	1	**6**	9	1	8	Ret	4	7	8	195
3	(Brazil) Paulo Gomes	6	7	10	**3**	2	2	Ret	16	2	194
4	(Brazil) Zeca Giaffone	4	Ret	2	Ret	3	3	2	2	1	188
5	(Brazil) Affonso Giaffone Jr.	7	Ret	**7**	**7**	**Ret**	**9**	**Ret**	**6**	**7**	172
6	(Brazil) Reinaldo Campello			8	8	11	1	8	10	9	169
7	(Brazil) Luiz Alberto Pereira	Ret	4	5	2	4	Ret	3	4	4	168
8	(Brazil) João Carlos Palhares	DNS	1	12	10	12	11	6	15	12	148
9	(Brazil) Walter Spinelli	3	3	4	4	5	4	Ret	3	5	142
10	(Brazil) Antonio Castro Prado	8	9			Ret	13	7		11	137
11	(Brazil) Marcos Troncon	Ret	5	6	Ret	7	5	Ret	5	6	117
12	(Brazil) Sidney Alves				9	9		5	8		100
13	(Brazil) José Catanhede	Ret	Ret	11			8			10	93
14	(Brazil) Marcos Gracia	2		Ret	11	**17**	Ret				79
15	(Brazil) João Correa	9	Ret	14	13	18	Ret	10	Ret	14	79
16	(Brazil) Armando Balbi					15	12	Ret	11		63
17	(Brazil) Joannis Likoroupoulos	DSQ	8	13		14	14	13	Ret	16	61
18	(Brazil) Jayme Figueiredo	Ret	Ret	Ret	Ret	16	17	9	9	15	59
19	(Brazil) José Luiz Nogueira	**5**									53
20	(Brazil) Antônio Carlos Avallone		Ret	3	5	6	DNP	Ret		DNS	35
21	(Brazil) Luis Carlos Sansone	Ret	10		14	13		11			17
22	(Brazil) Aloysio Andrade Filho	11	NC	15	15	Ret	15		14		17
23	(Brazil) René de Nigris	Ret	11	Ret	12	Ret	18		12	DNA	9
24	(Brazil) Carlos Drumond	Ret					6				4
25	(Brazil) Pedro Carneiro Pereira				DNP	10	7			19	3
26	(Brazil) Chico Serra	DNS		NC	Ret	Ret	Ret	NC	Ret	17	0
27	(Brazil) Edgar Mello Filho									Ret	0
28	(Brazil) Ricardo Fontanari	Ret			Ret				DNS		0
29	(Brazil) Alfredo Guaraná Menezes			Ret						Ret	0
30	(Brazil) Rodrigo Mello	Ret								DNQ	0
31	(Brazil) Leonardo Sánchez		AN				Ret				0
32	(Brazil) Guilherme Mottur			Ret			INF				0
33	(Brazil) Márcio Mauro				Ret						0
34	(Brazil) Ricardo Baptista	DNQ		INF	INF			Ret			0
35	(Brazil) Sylvio de Barros		Ret								0
36	(Brazil) Fernando Tradt							Ret			0
37	(Brazil) Roberto Fontanari				Ret						0
38	(Brazil) Mauro Turcatel					Ret					0
39	(Brazil) Julio Tedesco		DNQ	DNQ				DNPQ		Ret	0
40	(Brazil) Paulo Valiengo					Ret	NE	NE			0
41	(Brazil) Luiz Aladino Osorio	DSQ				Ret				Ret	0
42	(Brazil) José Carlos Giaffone	INF					Ret				0
Pos	Driver	(Rio Grande do Sul) TAR	(Rio de Janeiro (state)) RIO	(Rio Grande do Sul) GUA	(Federal District (Brazil)) BRA	(Goiás) GOI	(Paraná (state)) CAS	(Paraná (state)) CUR	(São Paulo (state)) INT1	(São Paulo (state)) INT2	Pts

Colour	Result
Gold	Winner
Silver	Second place
Bronze	Third place
Green	Points classification
Blue	Non-points classification
Blue	Non-classified finish (NC)
Purple	Retired, not classified (Ret)
Red	Did not qualify (DNQ)
Red	Did not pre-qualify (DNPQ)
Black	Disqualified (DSQ)
White	Did not start (DNS)
White	Withdrew (WD)
White	Race cancelled (C)
Blank	Did not practice (DNP)
Blank	Did not arrive (DNA)
Blank	Excluded (EX)

**Bold** – Pole position
Italics – Fastest lap
† – Retired, but classified
