= 1983 Stock Car Brasil season =

Car racing competition

Seasons
- ← 1982 1984 →

The 1983 Stock Car Brasil Championship was the fifth iteration of the Stock Car Brasil Championship. The season would begin at the Autódromo Internacional de Tarumã on March 27 and would conclude at the Interlagos Circuit on November 6.

The championship was won by Paulo Gomes, taking his second Stock Car Brasil championship crown.

== Calendar ==
The following circuits hosted at least one round of the 1983 championship.

Round	Circuit (Event)	Dates	Map
1	Autódromo Internacional de Tarumã; Viamão, Rio Grande do Sul	27 March	1983 Stock Car Brasil season is located in Brazil
2	Autódromo Internacional de Guaporé; Guaporé, Rio Grande do Sul	24 April	1983 Stock Car Brasil season is located in Brazil
3	(Federal District (Brazil)) Autódromo Internacional de Brasília; Brasília, Distrito Federal	8 May	1983 Stock Car Brasil season is located in Brazil
4	Autódromo Internacional de Goiânia; Goiânia, Goiás	22 May	1983 Stock Car Brasil season is located in Brazil
5	(Paraná (state)) Autódromo Internacional de Cascavel; Cascavel, Paraná	26 June	1983 Stock Car Brasil season is located in Brazil
6	(Paraná (state)) Autódromo Internacional de Curitiba; Curitiba, Paraná	10 July	1983 Stock Car Brasil season is located in Brazil
7	(Rio de Janeiro (state)) Autódromo de Jacarepaguá; Jacarepaguá, Rio de Janeiro	7 August	1983 Stock Car Brasil season is located in Brazil
8	(Rio de Janeiro (state)) Autódromo de Jacarepaguá; Jacarepaguá, Rio de Janeiro	16 October	1983 Stock Car Brasil season is located in Brazil
9	(São Paulo (state)) Autódromo de Interlagos; São Paulo, São Paulo	6 November	1983 Stock Car Brasil season is located in Brazil

== Teams and drivers ==
All teams and drivers were Brazilian-registered. All entrants ran the Chevrolet Opala car.

Entrant	Tire	No.	Driver	Rounds
Giaffone Motorsport	M	4	Pedro Alves	
Giaffone Motorsport	M	31	Zeca Giaffone	All
Metraux Team	C	5	Diumar Bueno	
Metraux Team	C	81	Luiz Alberto Pereira	All
Eugenio Lazzarini Racing	P	6	Lian Duarte	
Claude Bess Stock Cars	P	7	Wilson Fittipaldi Júnior	All
WB Motorsport	P	10	Edgard Mello Filho	
Team Valvoline	C	15	Chico Serra	All
Team Valvoline	C	58	Sidney Alves	
Spinelli Racing	C	16	Fábio Sotto Mayor	All
Spinelli Racing	C	73	Roberto Amaral	
Equipe Johnson	P	17	Ingo Hoffmann	All
Equipe Johnson	P	61	Roberto Massouh	
Team Semprucci IDM	B	20	Rodrigo Mello	
Equipe Coca-Cola Brasil/Polwax	C	22	Paulo Gomes	All
Equipe Coca-Cola Brasil/Polwax	C	49	Fabiano Brito	
Águia Autosport	M	23	Laércio Justino	
RS Rallye Sport	C	24	José Cangueiro	
RS Rallye Sport	C	77	Renato Martins	All
Castrol Racing	P	25	Leandro Almeida	
Castrol Racing	P	53	Ney Faustini	
Equipe Havoline-Texaco	P	30	Olimpio Alencar Jr.	All
Equipe Havoline-Texaco	P	47	Roberto Amaral	
Team Unemoto	C	37	Sérgio Drugovich	All
Team Unemoto	C	69	Oswaldo Drugovich Jr.	All
Herri Racing Team	M	46	Thiago Grison	All
Herri Racing Team	M	78	Fred Marinelli	
Camel Grand Prix	C	48	Márcio Mauro	
Camel Grand Prix	C	79	Fernando Tradt	
Boettger Competições	C	50	Aloysio Andrade Filho	
Chesterfield Racing	B	52	Guilherme Mottur	
AGV/MDS Racing Team	P	54	Djalma Fogaça	
AGV/MDS Racing Team	P	62	Heber Borlenghi	
Ringleberg Team	C	57	Vignaldo Fizio	All
Benson & Hedges Team	C	60	Walter Travaglini	All
Benson & Hedges Team	C	67	Adalberto Jardim	
Team Kepla	C	66	Beto Napolitano	
Team Kepla	C	86	Savio Murillo	
Tecno Racing	P	68	Paulo de Tarso	
Tecno Racing	P	94	Áttila Sipos	
Team Ducados	C	71	Luiz Carlos Lanzoni	All
BP Racing Team	C	80	Affonso Giaffone Jr.	
BP Racing Team	C	99	Jorge Fleck	
Bastos Racing Team	C	83	Camilo Christófaro Jr	
Team Brägger	P	84	José Carlos Dias	
Team Metalpó	B	87	Marcos Gracia	All
Team Metalpó	B	91	Luiz Bueno	

== Results and standings ==
=== Season summary ===
Round	Circuit	Date	Pole position	Fastest lap	Winning driver	Winning team
1	(Rio Grande do Sul) Tarumã	27 March	(Brazil) Luiz Bueno	(Brazil) Fábio Sotto Mayor	(Brazil) Zeca Giaffone	Giaffone Motorsport
2	(Rio Grande do Sul) Guaporé	24 April	(Brazil) Walter Travaglini	(Brazil) Paulo Gomes	(Brazil) Olimpio Alencar Jr.	Equipe Havoline-Texaco
3	(Federal District (Brazil)) Brasília	8 May	(Brazil) Zeca Giaffone	(Brazil) Ingo Hoffmann	(Brazil) Zeca Giaffone	Giaffone Motorsport
4	(Goiás) Goiânia	22 May	(Brazil) Roberto Massouh	(Brazil) Luiz Alberto Pereira	(Brazil) Olimpio Alencar Jr.	Equipe Havoline-Texaco
5	(Paraná (state)) Cascavel	26 June	(Brazil) Affonso Giaffone Jr.	(Brazil) Oswaldo Drugovich Jr.	(Brazil) Luiz Alberto Pereira	Metraux Team
6	(Paraná (state)) Curitiba	10 July	(Brazil) Roberto Amaral	(Brazil) Fábio Sotto Mayor	(Brazil) Ingo Hoffmann	Equipe Johnson
7	(Rio de Janeiro (state)) Jacarepaguá	7 August	(Brazil) Luiz Bueno	(Brazil) Marcos Gracia	(Brazil) Olimpio Alencar Jr.	Equipe Havoline-Texaco
8	(Rio de Janeiro (state)) Jacarepaguá	16 October	(Brazil) Oswaldo Drugovich Jr.	(Brazil) Walter Travaglini	(Brazil) Paulo Gomes	Equipe Coca-Cola Brasil/Polwax
9	(São Paulo (state)) Interlagos	6 November	(Brazil) Luiz Bueno	(Brazil) Zeca Giaffone	(Brazil) Ingo Hoffmann	Equipe Johnson

=== Championship standings ===
Pos	Driver	(Rio Grande do Sul) TAR	(Rio Grande do Sul) GUA	(Federal District (Brazil)) BRA	(Goiás) GOI	(Paraná (state)) CAS	(Paraná (state)) CUR	(Rio de Janeiro (state)) RIO2	(Rio de Janeiro (state)) RIO2	(São Paulo (state)) INT	Pts
1	(Brazil) Paulo Gomes	4	4	2	Ret	6	4	4	1	2	186
2	(Brazil) Luiz Alberto Pereira	8	8	4	2	1	3	2	2	5	170
3	(Brazil) Olimpio Alencar Jr.	6	1	11	1	Ret	2	1	3	DSQ	169
4	(Brazil) Wilson Fittipaldi Júnior	3	3	3	6	2	5	Ret	4	3	163
5	(Brazil) Ingo Hoffmann	2	2	12	4	Ret	1	Ret	Ret	1	159
6	(Brazil) Luiz Bueno		5	8		3	17	**3**		**4**	158
7	(Brazil) Fábio Sotto Mayor	7	7	5	5	5	6	5	7	Ret	151
8	(Brazil) Chico Serra	5	14	9	9	4	8	7	11	Ret	139
9	(Brazil) Marcos Gracia	10	6	6	3	Ret	Ret	Ret	9	DNS	135
10	(Brazil) Walter Travaglini	Ret	**Ret**	13	Ret	13	14	Ret	5	12	134
11	(Brazil) Zeca Giaffone	1	15	**1**	Ret	7	16	8	10	10	119
12	(Brazil) Renato Martins	9	Ret	10	12	Ret	7	10	6	6	114
13	(Brazil) Oswaldo Drugovich Jr.	11	16	7	13	9	11	9	**8**	Ret	107
14	(Brazil) Thiago Grison	19	10	17	8	Ret	9	6	14	9	84
15	(Brazil) Vignaldo Fizio	14	Ret	Ret	Ret	8	13	11	Ret	7	82
16	(Brazil) Fred Marinelli	Ret	Ret	Ret	7	10	18	Ret			76
17	(Brazil) Sérgio Drugovich	Ret	12	14	11	Ret	12	Ret	Ret	Ret	76
18	(Brazil) Jorge Fleck	13	11	15	10	14	15	Ret	Ret		73
19	(Brazil) José Carlos Dias	12	9	Ret					16		69
20	(Brazil) Walter Corsi Filho	15	Ret	Ret	Ret	11	10	Ret	15		63
21	(Brazil) Lian Duarte									8	62
22	(Brazil) Beto Napolitano									11	59
23	(Brazil) Luiz Carlos Lanzoni	16	13	16	Ret	12	Ret	DNS	13	Ret	55
24	(Brazil) Djalma Fogaça	17			Ret				12		37
25	(Brazil) Diumar Bueno								Ret		0
26	(Brazil) Adalberto Jardim	18									0
27	(Brazil) Sidney Alves			Ret							0
28	(Brazil) Roberto Amaral	Ret								Ret	0
29	(Brazil) Fabiano Brito		Ret						Ret		0
30	(Brazil) Pedro Alves					Ret	Wth				0
31	(Brazil) José Cangueiro								Wth		0
32	(Brazil) Heber Borlenghi		Ret			Ret					0
33	(Brazil) Affonso Giaffone Jr.	Ret					Wth				0
34	(Brazil) Savio Murillo							Ret			0
35	(Brazil) Oscar Chanoski				Ret						0
36	(Brazil) Roberto Massouh		DNQ				Ret				0
37	(Brazil) Áttila Sipos						Ret				0
38	(Brazil) Paulo de Tarso			Wth	DNQ						0
39	(Brazil) Adalberto Jardim								Ret		0
40	(Brazil) Ney Faustini		Ret				DNP				0
41	(Brazil) Leandro Almeida						Ret				0
42	(Brazil) Laércio Justino				DNQ					DNQ	0
43	(Brazil) Camilo Christófaro Jr.	DNQ									0
44	(Brazil) Aloysio Andrade Filho		DNQ			DSQ					0
45	(Brazil) Rodrigo Mello				DNQ						0
46	(Brazil) Guilherme Mottur		DNQ				DSQ				0
47	(Brazil) Fernando Tradt				DNQ						0
48	(Brazil) Márcio Mauro						DNQ			DSQ	0
Pos	Driver	(Rio Grande do Sul) TAR	(Rio Grande do Sul) GUA	(Federal District (Brazil)) BRA	(Goiás) GOI	(Paraná (state)) CAS	(Paraná (state)) CUR	(Rio de Janeiro (state)) RIO2	(Rio de Janeiro (state)) RIO2	(São Paulo (state)) INT	Pts

Colour	Result
Gold	Winner
Silver	Second place
Bronze	Third place
Green	Points classification
Blue	Non-points classification
Blue	Non-classified finish (NC)
Purple	Retired, not classified (Ret)
Red	Did not qualify (DNQ)
Red	Did not pre-qualify (DNPQ)
Black	Disqualified (DSQ)
White	Did not start (DNS)
White	Withdrew (WD)
White	Race cancelled (C)
Blank	Did not practice (DNP)
Blank	Did not arrive (DNA)
Blank	Excluded (EX)

**Bold** – Pole position
Italics – Fastest lap
† – Retired, but classified
