= 1981 Stock Car Brasil season =

Car racing competition

Seasons
- ← 1980 1982 →

The 1981 Stock Car Brasil Championship was the third iteration of the Stock Car Brasil Championship. The season would begin at the Autódromo Internacional de Tarumã on April 5 and would conclude at the Autódromo Internacional de Guaporé on October 25.

The championship was won by Affonso Giaffone Jr.

== Calendar ==
The following circuits hosted at least one round of the 1981 championship.

Round	Circuit (Event)	Dates	Map
1	Autódromo Internacional de Tarumã; Viamão, Rio Grande do Sul	5 April	1981 Stock Car Brasil season is located in Brazil
2	(Rio de Janeiro (state)) Autódromo Internacional Nelson Piquet; Jacarepaguá, Rio de Janeiro	3 May	1981 Stock Car Brasil season is located in Brazil
3	(São Paulo (state)) Autódromo José Carlos Pace; São Paulo, São Paulo	17 May	1981 Stock Car Brasil season is located in Brazil
4	(Federal District (Brazil)) Autódromo Internacional de Brasília; Brasília, Distrito Federal	7 June	1981 Stock Car Brasil season is located in Brazil
5	Autódromo Internacional de Goiânia; Goiânia, Goiás	21 June	1981 Stock Car Brasil season is located in Brazil
6	(Paraná (state)) Autódromo Internacional de Cascavel; Cascavel, Paraná	2 August	1981 Stock Car Brasil season is located in Brazil
7	(Paraná (state)) Autódromo Internacional de Curitiba; Curitiba, Paraná	9 August	1981 Stock Car Brasil season is located in Brazil
8	Autódromo Internacional de Guaporé; Guaporé, Rio Grande do Sul	25 October	1981 Stock Car Brasil season is located in Brazil

== Teams and drivers ==
All teams and drivers were Brazilian-registered. All entrants ran the Chevrolet Opala car.

Entrant	Tire	No.	Driver	Rounds
Castrol Racing	M	2	Guilherme Mottur	
Castrol Racing	M	93	Aloysio Andrade Filho	All
Spinelli Racing	C	3	Marcos Gracia	All
Spinelli Racing	C	13	Valtemir Spinelli	All
Spinelli Racing	C	43	Olimpio Alencar Jr.	All
Spinelli Racing	C	55	Toninho da Matta	
Oxigeral GP	B	4	Sylvio de Barros	
Equipe Johnson	P	9	Marcos Troncon	
Equipe Johnson	P	17	Ingo Hoffmann	All
Blindex Racing Team	M	11	Chico Serra	All
Jumbo Eletro Team	P	12	Antonio Castro Prado	
Jumbo Eletro Team	P	91	Armando Balbi	All
Camel Grand Prix	C	16	Joannis Likoroupoulos	
Camel Grand Prix	C	82	Reinaldo Campello	
Equipe Havoline-Texaco	P	20	José Luiz Nogueira	All
Equipe Havoline-Texaco	P	49	Jayme Figueiredo	
Equipe Coca-Cola Brasil/Polwax	C	22	Paulo Gomes	All
Equipe Coca-Cola Brasil/Polwax	C	67	Antônio Carlos Avallone	
Team Metalpó	B	23	José Catanhede	
Team Metalpó	B	25	Sidney Alves	
Giaffone Motorsport	M	26	Affonso Giaffone Jr.	All
Giaffone Motorsport	M	80	Zeca Giaffone	All
Team Metalpó-Combustol	M	30	Ricardo Fontanari	
Bastos Racing Team	C	34	Edgar Mello Filho	All
Valvoline Team	C	53	Fernando Tradt	
Valvoline Team	C	85	Alfredo Guaraná Menezes	All
Camel Grand Prix	C	59	Ricardo Baptista	
Camel Grand Prix	C	97	Luis Carlos Sansone	
HG/Rodão Motorsport	C	62	Carlos Drumond	
Renner Racing	C	72	Mauro Turcatel	
Renner Racing	C	81	João Correa	All
Larus Turbo/Sandvik/Net Oz SuperAuto	P	75	René de Nigris	
Ashford Motorsports	P	76	Márcio Mauro	
Molas Hoesch Team	G	84	Pedro Carneiro Pereira	
San Philipo/Objetivo Competições	C	94	João Carlos Palhares	
Águia Autosport	M	99	Leonardo Sánchez	

== Results and standings ==
=== Season summary ===
Round	Circuit	Date	Pole position	Fastest lap	Winning driver	Winning team
1	(Rio Grande do Sul) Tarumã	5 April	(Brazil) Ingo Hoffmann	(Brazil) Ingo Hoffmann	(Brazil) Ingo Hoffmann	Equipe Johnson
2	(Rio de Janeiro (state)) Jacarepaguá	3 May	(Brazil) Olimpio Alencar Jr.	(Brazil) Olimpio Alencar Jr.	(Brazil) Olimpio Alencar Jr.	Spinelli Racing
3	(São Paulo (state)) Interlagos	17 May	(Brazil) Affonso Giaffone Jr.	(Brazil) Olimpio Alencar Jr.	(Brazil) Reinaldo Campello	Camel Grand Prix
4	(Federal District (Brazil)) Brasília	7 June	(Brazil) Ingo Hoffmann	(Brazil) Paulo Gomes	(Brazil) Ingo Hoffmann	Equipe Johnson
5	(Goiás) Goiânia	21 June	(Brazil) Olimpio Alencar Jr.	(Brazil) Olimpio Alencar Jr.	(Brazil) Olimpio Alencar Jr.	Spinelli Racing
6	(Paraná (state)) Cascavel	2 August	(Brazil) Paulo Gomes	(Brazil) Reinaldo Campello	(Brazil) Olimpio Alencar Jr.	Spinelli Racing
7	(Paraná (state)) Curitiba	9 August	(Brazil) Affonso Giaffone Jr.	(Brazil) Affonso Giaffone Jr.	(Brazil) Affonso Giaffone Jr.	Giaffone Motorsport
8	(Rio Grande do Sul) Guaporé	25 October	(Brazil) Paulo Gomes	(Brazil) Reinaldo Campello	(Brazil) Reinaldo Campello	Camel Grand Prix

=== Championship standings ===
Pos	Driver	(Rio Grande do Sul) TAR	(Rio de Janeiro (state)) RIO	(São Paulo (state)) INT	(Federal District (Brazil)) BRA	(Goiás) GOI	(Paraná (state)) CAS	(Paraná (state)) CUR	(Rio Grande do Sul) GUA	Pts
1	(Brazil) Affonso Giaffone Jr.	2	9	Ret	2	3	2	1	Ret	84
2	(Brazil) Olimpio Alencar Jr	3	1	2	Ret	1	1	6	3	51
3	(Brazil) Zeca Giaffone	5	3	9	8	4	3	7	2	47
4	(Brazil) Reinaldo Campello	18		1	3			2	1	45
5	(Brazil) Paulo Gomes	6	2	6	7	5	7	4	6	45
6	(Brazil) Ingo Hoffmann	1	4	5	Ret	2	5	8	5	44
7	(Brazil) Valtemir Spinelli	7	Ret	Ret	6	11	6	5	4	43
8	(Brazil) Marcos Gracia	10	7	DSQ	4	7	4	3	Ret	35
9	(Brazil) Alfredo Guaraná Menezes	4	Ret	13	Ret	10	Ret	16	7	34
10	(Brazil) Luis Carlos Sansone		Ret			12	12			34
11	(Brazil) Aloysio Andrade Filho	20	13	Ret	14	18	9	Ret	9	32
12	(Brazil) Edgar Mello Filho	DNS	5	3	Ret	6	8	10	Ret	31
13	(Brazil) João Correa	Ret	6	7	12	16	10	11	8	28
14	(Brazil) Chico Serra	9	DSQ	4	Ret	8	Ret	Ret	Ret	27
15	(Brazil) René de Nigris				1			9		21
16	(Brazil) João Carlos Palhares		Ret	Ret	11	13	15	Ret	10	19
17	(Brazil) Carlos Drumond				5					10
18	(Brazil) Toninho da Matta	8	8	12			11			9
19	(Brazil) José Catanhede (Catanha)	16	14	8	Ret					7
20	(Brazil) Armando Balbi	11	Ret	15	9	14		12	12	6
21	(Brazil) Pedro Carneiro Pereira	13		Ret	10	9				6
22	(Brazil) Ricardo Fontanari	17	10	16	16	DNS			14	4
23	(Brazil) Sidney Alves	19	Ret	10			13	14		4
24	(Brazil) Jayme Figueiredo	14	12	14	13	17			11	3
25	(Brazil) José Luiz Nogueira	12	11	11	15	15	14	15	13	3
26	(Brazil) Antônio Carlos Avallone							13		2
27	(Brazil) Leonardo Sánchez	15	15							2
28	(Brazil) Marcos Troncon				Ret			17		0
29	(Brazil) Joannis Likoroupoulos	Ret			DNS	Ret		Ret		0
30	(Brazil) Fernando Tradt							Ret	Ret	0
31	(Brazil) Guilherme Mottur	DNS	DNS	Ret				DNS		0
32	(Brazil) Márcio Mauro			Ret						0
33	(Brazil) Ricardo Baptista								Ret	0
34	(Brazil) Antonio Castro Prado	AN			Ret					0
35	(Brazil) Sylvio de Barros						Ret	Ret		0
36	(Brazil) Mauro Turcatel							Ret		0
Pos	Driver	(Rio Grande do Sul) TAR	(Rio de Janeiro (state)) RIO	(São Paulo (state)) INT	(Federal District (Brazil)) BRA	(Goiás) GOI	(Paraná (state)) CAS	(Paraná (state)) CUR	(Rio Grande do Sul) GUA	Pts

Colour	Result
Gold	Winner
Silver	Second place
Bronze	Third place
Green	Points classification
Blue	Non-points classification
Blue	Non-classified finish (NC)
Purple	Retired, not classified (Ret)
Red	Did not qualify (DNQ)
Red	Did not pre-qualify (DNPQ)
Black	Disqualified (DSQ)
White	Did not start (DNS)
White	Withdrew (WD)
White	Race cancelled (C)
Blank	Did not practice (DNP)
Blank	Did not arrive (DNA)
Blank	Excluded (EX)

**Bold** – Pole position
Italics – Fastest lap
† – Retired, but classified
