= 1985 Stock Car Brasil season =

Car racing competition

Seasons
- ← 1984 1986 →

The 1985 Stock Car Brasil Championship was the seventh iteration of the Stock Car Brasil Championship. The season would begin at the Autódromo Internacional de Tarumã on April 21 and would conclude at the Interlagos Circuit on December 8.

The championship was won by Ingo Hoffmann, taking his second Stock Car Brasil championship crown.

== Calendar ==
The following circuits hosted at least one round of the 1985 championship.

Round	Circuit (Event)	Dates	Map
1	Autódromo Internacional de Tarumã; Viamão, Rio Grande do Sul	April 21	1985 Stock Car Brasil season is located in Brazil
2	(Rio de Janeiro (state)) Autódromo de Jacarepaguá; Jacarepaguá, Rio de Janeiro	May 12	1985 Stock Car Brasil season is located in Brazil
3	Autódromo Internacional de Guaporé; Guaporé, Rio Grande do Sul	June 9	1985 Stock Car Brasil season is located in Brazil
4	(Federal District (Brazil)) Autódromo Internacional de Brasília; Brasília, Distrito Federal	July 14	1985 Stock Car Brasil season is located in Brazil
5	Autódromo Internacional de Goiânia; Goiânia, Goiás	August 11	1985 Stock Car Brasil season is located in Brazil
6	(Paraná (state)) Autódromo Internacional de Cascavel; Cascavel, Paraná	October 6	1985 Stock Car Brasil season is located in Brazil
7	(Paraná (state)) Autódromo Internacional de Curitiba; Curitiba, Paraná	October 13	1985 Stock Car Brasil season is located in Brazil
8	(São Paulo (state)) Autódromo José Carlos Pace; São Paulo, São Paulo	December 8	1985 Stock Car Brasil season is located in Brazil

== Teams and drivers ==
All teams and drivers, with the exception of the American-born Gene Fireball, were Brazilian-registered. All cars run in the series were Chevrolet Opala.

Entrant	Tyre	No.	Driver	Rounds
Spinelli Racing	C	1	(Brazil) Marcos Gracia	All
Spinelli Racing	C	65	(Brazil) Beto Napolitano	2, 5–8
Equipe Coca-Cola Brasil/Polwax	C	10	(Brazil) César Villela	All
Equipe Coca-Cola Brasil/Polwax	C	64	(Brazil) Walter Travaglini	All
Kohlbach Engineering	P	13	(Brazil) Savio Murillo	All
Kohlbach Engineering	P	30	(Brazil) Oscar Chanoski	All
Team Metalpó	B	16	(Brazil) Thiago Grison	2–4, 6–8
Team Metalpó	B	67	(Brazil) Paulo Gomes	All
Renner Racing	C	18	(Brazil) José Cangueiro	5–6, 8
Renner Racing	C	27	(Brazil) Sidney Alves	1–4, 6–8
Equipe Havoline-Texaco	C	21	(Brazil) Vignaldo Fizio	All
Equipe Havoline-Texaco	C	98	(Brazil) Clayton Peres	2, 8
Camel Grand Prix	C	22	(Brazil) Chico Serra	All
Camel Grand Prix	C	23	(Brazil) Roberto Amaral	1–3, 6–8
Equipe Johnson	P	29	(Brazil) Renato Martins	All
Equipe Johnson	P	47	(Brazil) Jorge Fleck	5
Rothmans International	C	33	(Brazil) Paulo Valiengo	6–7
Team Marlboro	M	38	(Brazil) Sebastião Andrade	2, 5
Team Marlboro	M	79	(Brazil) Paulo de Tarso Marques	All
Action/Sultox-Sulpesca Racing	P	40	(Brazil) Heber Borlenghi	3, 7–8
Action/Sultox-Sulpesca Racing	P	88	(Brazil) Reinaldo Campello	8
Forbox Corporation	C	41	(United States) Gene Fireball	All
Bunge Bioenergia Racing	B	42	(Brazil) Evaldo Quadrado	All
Bunge Bioenergia Racing	B	57	(Brazil) João Correa	8
Equipe Havoline-Texaco	P	48	(Brazil) Olimpio Alencar Jr.	All
Equipe Havoline-Texaco	P	55	(Brazil) Walter Corsi Filho	All
Objetivo Competições	C	49	(Brazil) Nelson Lacerda	All
Objetivo Competições	C	70	(Brazil) Laércio Justino	All
Castrol Racing	M	50	(Brazil) Djalma Fogaça	All
Castrol Racing	M	97	(Brazil) Fred Marinelli	6–7
Giaffone Motorsport	M	53	(Brazil) Affonso Giaffone Jr.	All
Giaffone Motorsport	M	74	(Brazil) Zeca Giaffone	All
Team Playlife	G	60	(Brazil) Pedro Muffato	3–8
Team Playlife	G	95	(Brazil) Ricardo Steinfeld	3, 8
Oxigeral GP	C	68	(Brazil) Diumar Bueno	All
JF Racing	B	73	(Brazil) Ingo Hoffmann	All
JF Racing	B	90	(Brazil) Fabiano Brito	3
Rodão Motorsport	P	80	(Brazil) Leonardo Almeida	1–2

== Results and standings ==
=== Season summary ===
Round	Circuit	Date	Pole position	Fastest lap	Winning driver	Winning team
1	(Rio Grande do Sul) Tarumã	April 21	(Brazil) Affonso Giaffone Jr.	(Brazil) César Villela	(Brazil) Paulo Gomes	Team Metalpó
2	(Rio de Janeiro (state)) Jacarepaguá	May 12	(Brazil) Affonso Giaffone Jr.	(Brazil) Affonso Giaffone Jr.	(Brazil) Ingo Hoffmann	JF Racing
3	(Rio Grande do Sul) Guaporé	June 9	(Brazil) Nelson Lacerda	(Brazil) Oscar Chanoski	(Brazil) Zeca Giaffone	Giaffone Motorsport
4	(Federal District (Brazil)) Brasília	July 14	(Brazil) Reinaldo Campello	(Brazil) Marcos Gracia	(Brazil) Ingo Hoffmann	JF Racing
5	(Goiás) Goiânia	August 11	(Brazil) Olimpio Alencar Jr.	(Brazil) Ingo Hoffmann	(Brazil) Olimpio Alencar Jr.	Equipe Havoline-Texaco
6	(Paraná (state)) Cascavel	October 6	(Brazil) Affonso Giaffone Jr.	(Brazil) Ingo Hoffmann	(Brazil) Ingo Hoffmann	JF Racing
7	(Paraná (state)) Curitiba	October 13	(Brazil) Ingo Hoffmann	(Brazil) Ingo Hoffmann	(Brazil) Ingo Hoffmann	JF Racing
8	(São Paulo (state)) Interlagos	December 8	(Brazil) Reinaldo Campello	(Brazil) Ingo Hoffmann	(Brazil) Ingo Hoffmann	JF Racing

=== Championship standings ===
Pos	Driver	(Rio Grande do Sul) TAR	(Rio de Janeiro (state)) RIO	(Rio Grande do Sul) GUA	(Federal District (Brazil)) BRA	(Goiás) GOI	(Paraná (state)) CAS	(Paraná (state)) CUR	(São Paulo (state)) INT	Pts
1	(Brazil) Ingo Hoffmann	2	1	5	1	4	1	**1**	1	194
2	(Brazil) Affonso Giaffone Jr.	**Ret**	**3**	DNS	3	Ret	**4**	Ret	3	186
3	(Brazil) Marcos Gracia	3	4	10	7	2	Ret	5	7	180
4	(Brazil) Paulo Gomes	1	7	2	5	15	6	9	4	176
5	(Brazil) Olimpio Alencar Jr.	Ret	5	DNS	9	**1**	2	2	5	174
6	(Brazil) Chico Serra	4	Ret	4	6	Ret	3	14	2	140
7	(Brazil) César Villela	Ret	Ret	3	8	Ret	18	6	Ret	134
8	(Brazil) Zeca Giaffone	5	6	1	2	3	7	3	10	132
9	(Brazil) Oscar Chanoski	10	2	Ret	13	Ret	15	Ret	Ret	128
10	(Brazil) Sidney Alves	7	Ret	8	11		5	4	9	118
11	(Brazil) Vignaldo Fizio	Ret	Ret	7	14	DNS	DSQ	16	11	100
12	(Brazil) Evaldo Quadrado	11	Ret	Ret	16	Ret	11	8	Ret	92
13	(Brazil) Diumar Bueno	6	Ret	DNS	4	Ret	10	Ret	Ret	88
14	(United States) Gene Fireball	Ret	Ret	13	Ret	5	12	11	Ret	83
15	(Brazil) Pedro Muffato			16	15	8	Ret	DNS	6	73
16	(Brazil) Sérgio Ramalho	9	8	11	10	6	9	7	14	71
17	(Brazil) Paulo de Tarso Marques	14	Ret	6	12	7	8	15	15	60
18	(Brazil) Laércio Justino	8	Ret	DNS	17	Ret	14	Ret	18	56
19	(Brazil) Reinaldo Campello								**8**	52
20	(Brazil) Nelson Lacerda	8	Ret	**DNS**	17	Ret	14	Ret	18	50
21	(Brazil) Savio Murillo	13	11	9	Ret	Ret	Ret	DNS	Ret	41
22	(Brazil) Roberto Amaral	12	9	Ret			Ret	17	DNQ	23
23	(Brazil) Walter Corsi Filho	Ret	12	12	Ret	9	17	13	13	20
24	(Brazil) Renato Martins	15	10	17	Ret	14	Ret	DNS	12	17
25	(Brazil) Walter Travaglini	Ret	Ret	15	19	10	16	Ret	DNQ	11
26	(Brazil) Beto Napolitano		Ret			12	Ret	10	19	9
27	(Brazil) Jorge Fleck					11				8
28	(Brazil) Thiago Grison		Ret	DNS	18		13	12	17	5
29	(Brazil) Djalma Fogaça	Ret	13	14	Ret	13	Ret	Ret	16	2
30	(Brazil) Fred Marinelli						Ret	DNS		0
31	(Brazil) Leonardo Almeida	Ret	Ret							0
32	(Brazil) Fabiano Brito			Ret						0
33	(Brazil) Heber Borlenghi			Ret				Ret	Ret	0
34	(Brazil) José Cangueiro					Ret	Ret		Ret	0
35	(Brazil) Clayton Peres		Ret						Ret	0
36	(Brazil) Roberto Massouh	Ret			Ret					0
37	(Brazil) Ricardo Steinfeld			DNQ					Ret	0
38	(Brazil) Sebastião Andrade		Ret			Ret				0
39	(Brazil) João Correa								Ret	0
40	(Brazil) Paulo Valiengo						DNQ	Ret		0
Pos	Driver	(Rio Grande do Sul) TAR	(Rio de Janeiro (state)) RIO	(Rio Grande do Sul) GUA	(Federal District (Brazil)) BRA	(Goiás) GOI	(Paraná (state)) CAS	(Paraná (state)) CUR	(São Paulo (state)) INT	Pts

Colour	Result
Gold	Winner
Silver	Second place
Bronze	Third place
Green	Points classification
Blue	Non-points classification
Blue	Non-classified finish (NC)
Purple	Retired, not classified (Ret)
Red	Did not qualify (DNQ)
Red	Did not pre-qualify (DNPQ)
Black	Disqualified (DSQ)
White	Did not start (DNS)
White	Withdrew (WD)
White	Race cancelled (C)
Blank	Did not practice (DNP)
Blank	Did not arrive (DNA)
Blank	Excluded (EX)

**Bold** – Pole position
Italics – Fastest lap
† – Retired, but classified
