= 1986 Stock Car Brasil season =

Car racing competition

Seasons
- ← 1985 1987 →

The 1986 Stock Car Brasil Championship was the eighth iteration of the Stock Car Brasil Championship. The season would begin at the Autódromo Internacional de Tarumã on March 20 and would conclude at the Interlagos Circuit on December 14.

The championship was won by Marcos Gracia.

== Calendar ==
The following circuits hosted at least one round of the 1986 championship.

Round	Circuit (Event)	Dates	Map
1	Autódromo Internacional de Tarumã; Viamão, Rio Grande do Sul	March 20	1986 Stock Car Brasil season is located in Brazil
2	(Rio de Janeiro (state)) Autódromo de Jacarepaguá; Jacarepaguá, Rio de Janeiro	April 13	1986 Stock Car Brasil season is located in Brazil
3	Autódromo Internacional de Guaporé; Guaporé, Rio Grande do Sul	May 11	1986 Stock Car Brasil season is located in Brazil
4	(Federal District (Brazil)) Autódromo Internacional de Brasília; Brasília, Distrito Federal	May 25	1986 Stock Car Brasil season is located in Brazil
5	Autódromo Internacional de Goiânia; Goiânia, Goiás	June 8	1986 Stock Car Brasil season is located in Brazil
6	(Paraná (state)) Autódromo Internacional de Cascavel; Cascavel, Paraná	July 27	1986 Stock Car Brasil season is located in Brazil
7	(Paraná (state)) Autódromo Internacional de Curitiba; Curitiba, Paraná	August 3	1986 Stock Car Brasil season is located in Brazil
8	Minas Gerais; Minas Gerais	September 14	1986 Stock Car Brasil season is located in Brazil
9	Pernambuco; Pernambuco	October 12	1986 Stock Car Brasil season is located in Brazil
10	(São Paulo (state)) Autódromo José Carlos Pace; São Paulo, São Paulo	December 7	1986 Stock Car Brasil season is located in Brazil
11	(São Paulo (state)) Autódromo José Carlos Pace; São Paulo, São Paulo	December 14	1986 Stock Car Brasil season is located in Brazil

== Teams and drivers ==
All teams and drivers were Brazilian-registered. All cars run in the series were Chevrolet Opala.

Entrant	Tyre	No.	Driver	Rounds
Dalphin Engenharia	B	3	Nelson Lacerda	5–10
Dalphin Engenharia	B	37	Leandro Almeida	All
Carretas FG Racing	P	4	Sebastião Andrade	5, 9–10
Carretas FG Racing	P	26	Laércio Justino	1–6, 8–11
Renocap Team	M	5	Adalberto Jardim	All
Palace Racing	C	6	Dimas Mello Pimeta	All
Palace Racing	C	44	Robert Amaral	All
Drible/Ótica Catumbi Motors	C	7	José Carlos Dias	All
Drible/Ótica Catumbi Motors	C	52	Oscar Chanoski	1–5
Rothmans International	C	8	Walter Corsi Filho	2–11
Caster Competições	C	9	Ricardo Steinfeld	2, 10–11
Caster Competições	C	70	Ney Faustini	All
Filadélfia Engineering	P	10	Affonso Giaffone Jr.	All
Filadélfia Engineering	P	62	Luiz Alberto Pereira	All
Cibranox Motorsport	C	12	Fábio Sotto Mayor	All
Cibranox Motorsport	C	88	José Luiz Nogueira	1, 8, 11
Team Marlboro	M	13	Chico Serra	All
Team Marlboro	M	22	Paulo Gomes	All
Dimep Grand Prix	M	14	Fausto Waichemberg	2–3, 6, 10
Dimep Grand Prix	M	98	Leonardo Almeida	6, 11
Team Playlife	G	17	Ingo Hoffmann	All
Team Playlife	G	39	João Batista Neto	1–3
Net Oz SuperAuto	C	18	Camilo Christófaro Jr	All
Net Oz SuperAuto	C	25	Ananias Justino	2, 5–7
BP Bunge Bioenergia Racing	B	19	Olimpio Alencar Jr	All
BP Bunge Bioenergia Racing	B	56	Valmir Benavides	1–3, 7
Forbox Corporation	C	31	Zeca Giaffone	2–11
Forbox Corporation	C	51	Paulo de Tarso	5, 9–11
John Player Special Racing	P	33	Walter Travaglini	2–11
John Player Special Racing	P	55	José Catanhede	1, 3, 6–11
Jumbo Eletro Team	P	38	Lian Duarte	All
Fabidan Company	M	42	Roberto Raad Massouh	3, 10
Fabidan Company	M	83	César Villela	1–3, 6–11
Macarrão Eme-Gê Autosport	B	45	Luiz Aladino Osorio	7, 11
Macarrão Eme-Gê Autosport	B	99	Reinaldo Campello	1–3
Blindex Racing Team	M	46	Áttila Sipos	1–3, 6–11
Action/Sultox-Sulpesca Racing	P	64	Joannis Likoroupoulos	4, 10
Action/Sultox-Sulpesca Racing	P	69	Savio Murillo	All
Action/Sultox-Sulpesca Racing	P	77	Aloysio Andrade Filho	1–5, 7
Equipe Havoline-Texaco	C	67	Marcos Garcia	All
Equipe Havoline-Texaco	C	82	Olavo Lima Filho	2, 4, 6–7, 9, 11
Verde e Amarelo Motorsport	P	86	Sebastião Andrade	5, 9–10
Verde e Amarelo Motorsport	P	94	Laércio Justino	1–6, 8–11

== Results and standings ==
=== Season summary ===
Round	Circuit	Date	Pole position	Fastest lap	Winning driver	Winning team
1	(Rio Grande do Sul) Tarumã	30 March	(Brazil) Olimpio Alencar Jr.	(Brazil) Leandro Almeida	(Brazil) Ingo Hoffmann	Team Playlife
2	(Rio de Janeiro (state)) Jacarepaguá	13 April	(Brazil) Walter Travaglini	(Brazil) Paulo Gomes	(Brazil) Zeca Giaffone	Forbox Corporation
3	(Rio Grande do Sul) Guaporé	11 May	(Brazil) Walter Corsi Filho	(Brazil) Fábio Sotto Mayor	(Brazil) Fábio Sotto Mayor	Cibranox Motorsport
4	(Federal District (Brazil)) Brasília	25 May	(Brazil) Ingo Hoffmann	(Brazil) Ingo Hoffmann	(Brazil) Ingo Hoffmann	Team Playlife
5	(Goiás) Goiânia	8 June	(Brazil) Áttila Sipos	(Brazil) Savio Murillo	(Brazil) Luiz Alberto Pereira	Filadélfia Engineering
6	(Paraná (state)) Cascavel	27 July	(Brazil) Savio Murillo	(Brazil) Marcos Gracia	(Brazil) Marcos Gracia	Equipe Havoline-Texaco
7	(Paraná (state)) Curitiba	3 August	(Brazil) Olimpio Alencar Jr.	(Brazil) Marcos Gracia	(Brazil) Ingo Hoffmann	Team Playlife
8	Minas Gerais	14 September	(Brazil) César Villela	(Brazil) Zeca Giaffone	(Brazil) Olimpio Alencar Jr.	BP Bunge Bioenergia Racing
9	Pernambuco	12 October	(Brazil) Laércio Justino	(Brazil) Paulo Gomes	(Brazil) Zeca Giaffone	Forbox Corporation
10	(São Paulo (state)) Interlagos	7 December	(Brazil) Olimpio Alencar Jr.	(Brazil) Zeca Giaffone	(Brazil) Zeca Giaffone	Forbox Corporation
11	(São Paulo (state)) Interlagos	14 December	(Brazil) Marcos Gracia	(Brazil) Marcos Gracia	(Brazil) Marcos Gracia	Equipe Havoline-Texaco

=== Championship standings ===
Pos	Driver	(Rio Grande do Sul) TAR	(Rio de Janeiro (state)) RIO	(Rio Grande do Sul) GUA	(Federal District (Brazil)) BRA	(Goiás) GOI	(Paraná (state)) CAS	(Paraná (state)) CUR	(Minas Gerais) MIN	(Pernambuco) PER	(São Paulo (state)) INT1	(São Paulo (state)) INT2	Pts
1	(Brazil) Marcos Gracia	Ret	8	4	3	DNS	1	20	14	5	3	1	137
2	(Brazil) Ingo Hoffmann	1	3	Ret	1	8	2	1	6	Ret	5	5	130
3	(Brazil) Zeca Giaffone		1	3	5	5	Ret	3	2	1	1	8	114
4	(Brazil) Fábio Sotto Mayor	5	7	1	12	2	3	12	8	Ret	6	7	98
5	(Brazil) Luiz Alberto Pereira	9	4	Ret	2	1	5	7	7	7	17	6	86
6	(Brazil) Olimpio Alencar Jr.	2	5	6	7	11	10	5	1	8	11	11	69
7	(Brazil) José Carlos Dias	14	2	Ret	10	3	Ret	4	10	16	16	3	59
8	(Brazil) Paulo Gomes	6	Ret	5	9	7	7	13	11	4	8	4	57
9	(Brazil) Chico Serra	3	10	18	6	6	6	15	13	11	12	9	39
10	(Brazil) Walter Travaglini	Ret	Ret	8			4	9	9	2	2	Ret	38
11	(Brazil) Walter Corsi Filho		Ret	Ret	16	10	Ret	6	3	DSQ	4	2	36
12	(Brazil) Lian Duarte	4	9	2	DNS	DNS	18	11	Ret	10	7	Ret	32
13	(Brazil) Affonso Giaffone Jr.	16	11	9	Ret	DNS	Ret	2	4	17	13	DNS	29
14	(Brazil) Áttila Sipos	8	Ret	Ret		Ret		14	16	3	Ret	15	22
15	(Brazil) Leandro Almeida	Ret	Ret	Ret	4	4	Ret	8	12	Ret	DNS	12	20
16	(Brazil) Savio Murillo	11	Ret	Ret	8	Ret	9	10	5	6	15	Ret	19
17	(Brazil) Camilo Christófaro Jr.	DNS	6	7	11	9	8	Ret	15	9	Ret	13	18
18	(Brazil) Ney Faustini	7	14	Ret	15	13	11	Ret	18	Ret	10	18	16
19	(Brazil) Júlio Coimbra	15	15	12	Ret	Ret	13	17	17	Ret	DNS	Ret	15
20	(Brazil) Adalberto Jardim	Ret	18	13	14	15	16	18	19	13	14	17	13
21	(Brazil) Laércio Justino	DNS	Ret	10	DNS	DNS	12		20	14	Ret	14	12
22	(Brazil) Reinaldo Campello	17	DNQ	16									11
23	(Brazil) César Villela	13	13	17			17	21	Ret	15	9	19	10
24	(Brazil) Roberto Amaral	DNS	12	11	18	Ret	15	16	21	DNS	18	16	9
25	(Brazil) Dimas Mello Pimenta	Ret	DNQ	Ret	17	14	14	Ret	22	12	Ret	21	7
26	(Brazil) Luiz Aladino Osorio							Ret				10	7
27	(Brazil) Aloysio Andrade Filho	10	19	Ret	13	12		Ret					5
28	(Brazil) João Batista Neto	12	17	14									4
29	(Brazil) Valmir Benavides	Ret	16	15				19					2
30	(Brazil) José Catanhede	DNS		Ret			Ret	DSQ	Ret	18	Ret	20	0
31	(Brazil) Oscar Chanoski	Ret	DNS	NC	Ret	Ret							0
32	(Brazil) Paulo de Tarso Marques					Ret				Ret	Ret	NC	0
33	(Brazil) Ananias Justino		Ret			DNQ	DNQ	NC					0
34	(Brazil) Nelson Lacerda					DNQ	DNQ	Ret	DNQ	Ret	DNQ		0
35	(Brazil) Joannis Likoroupoulos				Ret						DNQ		0
36	(Brazil) Olavo Lima Filho		DNQ		Ret		DNQ	Ret		DNPQ		Ret	0
37	(Brazil) José Luiz Nogueira	DNPQ							DNQ			Ret	0
38	(Brazil) Renato Marlia		Ret	INF			DNPQ		DNQ	Ret	Ret	Ret	0
39	(Brazil) Roberto Massouh			Ret							DNQ		0
40	(Brazil) Ricardo Steinfeld		INF								Ret	Ret	0
41	(Brazil) Fausto Waichemberg		Ret	Ret			Ret				Ret		0
42	(Brazil) Sebastião Andrade					Ret				INF	INF		0
43	(Brazil) Leonardo Almeida						INF					Ret	0
Pos	Driver	(Rio Grande do Sul) TAR	(Rio de Janeiro (state)) RIO	(Rio Grande do Sul) GUA	(Federal District (Brazil)) BRA	(Goiás) GOI	(Paraná (state)) CAS	(Paraná (state)) CUR	(Minas Gerais) MIN	(Pernambuco) PER	(São Paulo (state)) INT1	(São Paulo (state)) INT2	Pts
