= 1982 Stock Car Brasil season =

Car racing competition

Seasons
- ← 1981 1983 →

The 1982 Stock Car Brasil Championship was the fourth iteration of the Stock Car Brasil Championship. The season would begin at the Autódromo de Jacarepaguá on March 7 and would conclude at the Interlagos Circuit on October 17.

This season marked the first series' international races at the Circuito do Estoril in Portugal, albeit as non-championship events. The championship was won by Olimpio Alencar Jr.

== Calendar ==
The following circuits hosted at least one round of the 1982 championship.

Round	Circuit (Event)	Dates	Map
1	(Rio de Janeiro (state)) Autódromo de Jacarepaguá; Jacarepaguá, Rio de Janeiro	7 March	1982 Stock Car Brasil season is located in Brazil
2	(Rio de Janeiro (state)) Autódromo de Jacarepaguá; Jacarepaguá, Rio de Janeiro	21 March	1982 Stock Car Brasil season is located in Brazil
3	(São Paulo (state)) Autódromo de Interlagos; Interlagos, São Paulo	4 April	1982 Stock Car Brasil season is located in Brazil
4	(São Paulo (state)) Autódromo de Interlagos; Interlagos, São Paulo	9 May	1982 Stock Car Brasil season is located in Brazil
5	(São Paulo (state)) Autódromo de Interlagos; Interlagos, São Paulo	30 May	1982 Stock Car Brasil season is located in Brazil
6	(Rio de Janeiro (state)) Autódromo de Jacarepaguá; Jacarepaguá, Rio de Janeiro	20 June	1982 Stock Car Brasil season is located in Brazil
NC	Circuito do Estoril; Cascais, Portugal	3 July	1982 Stock Car Brasil season is located in Brazil
NC	Circuito do Estoril; Cascais, Portugal	18 July	1982 Stock Car Brasil season is located in Brazil
7	(Paraná (state)) Autódromo Internacional de Curitiba; Curitiba, Paraná	8 August	1982 Stock Car Brasil season is located in Brazil
8	(São Paulo (state)) Autódromo de Interlagos; Interlagos, São Paulo	12 September	1982 Stock Car Brasil season is located in Brazil
9	(São Paulo (state)) Autódromo de Interlagos; Interlagos, São Paulo	17 October	1982 Stock Car Brasil season is located in Brazil

== Teams and drivers ==
All teams and drivers were Brazilian-registered. All entrants ran the Chevrolet Opala car.

Entrant	Tire	Driver	Rounds
Equipe Coca-Cola Brasil/Polwax	C	Paulo Gomes	All
Equipe Coca-Cola Brasil/Polwax	C	Thiago Grison	
Equipe Johnson	P	Ingo Hoffmann	All
Equipe Johnson	P	Oswaldo Drugovich Jr.	
Giaffone Motorsport	M	Zeca Giaffone	All
Giaffone Motorsport	M	Sidney Alves	
Spinelli Racing	C	Olimpio Alencar Jr.	All
Spinelli Racing	C	Marcos Gracia	All
Equipe Havoline-Texaco	P	Reinaldo Campello	All
Equipe Havoline-Texaco	P	Luiz Bueno	
Team Metalpó	B	Alfredo Guaraná Menezes	
Team Metalpó	B	Wagner França	
Castrol Racing	M	Fernando Tradt	
Castrol Racing	M	Carlos Drumond	
Bastos Racing Team	C	Rodrigo Mello	
Rothmans International	P	Mauro Turcatel	
Boettger Competições	C	Ricardo Baptista	
Claude Bess Stock Cars	P	Wilson Fittipaldi Júnior	All
Claude Bess Stock Cars	P	Vignaldo Fizio	
Cedro Cereais/Pneulândia/Fabidan Company	B	José Cangueiro	
Charm Equipe	M	Eraldo Rosa	
Macarrão Eme-Gê Autosport	P	Dirceu Raupp Jr.	
Macarrão Eme-Gê Autosport	P	José Luís Barrinuevo	
Dimep Grand Prix	C	Francisco Martin	
Dimep Grand Prix	C	Antonio Martins	
Renocap Team	C	Luiz Alberto Pereira	
Carretas FG Racing	C	Sylvio de Barros	
Carretas FG Racing	C	Guilherme Mottur	
Caster Competições	P	Márcio Mauro	
Caster Competições	P	Leonardo Sánchez	
Drible/Ótica Catumbi Motors	P	Ricardo Fontanari	
Oxigeral GP	M	Paulo Valiengo	
Oxigeral GP	M	Vanderley de Brito	
Forbox Corporation	C	Luiz Aladino Osorio	
Forbox Corporation	C	Clóvis Navarro	
Kohlbach Engineering	C	Julio Tedesco	
Kohlbach Engineering	C	Pedro Rodrigues	
Scuderia Bernardini	M	Edgar Mello Filho	
Scuderia Bernardini	M	Luiz Carlos Lanzoni	
Team Marlboro	P	Renato Martins	
Team Marlboro	P	Sérgio Drugovich	
Semer Competições	G	Chico Serra	
Semer Competições	G	Gilberto Hidalgo	

== Results and standings ==
=== Season summary ===
Round	Circuit	Date	Pole position	Fastest lap	Winning driver	Winning team
1	(Rio de Janeiro (state)) Jacarepaguá	7 March	(Brazil) Olimpio Alencar Jr.	(Brazil) Paulo Gomes	(Brazil) Olimpio Alencar Jr.	Spinelli Racing
2	(Rio de Janeiro (state)) Jacarepaguá	21 March	(Brazil) Olimpio Alencar Jr.	(Brazil) Olimpio Alencar Jr.	(Brazil) Olimpio Alencar Jr.	Spinelli Racing
3	(São Paulo (state)) Interlagos	4 April	(Brazil) Olimpio Alencar Jr.	(Brazil) Olimpio Alencar Jr.	(Brazil) Olimpio Alencar Jr.	Spinelli Racing
4	(São Paulo (state)) Interlagos	9 May	(Brazil) Olimpio Alencar Jr.	(Brazil) Olimpio Alencar Jr.	(Brazil) Olimpio Alencar Jr.	Spinelli Racing
5	(São Paulo (state)) Interlagos	30 May	(Brazil) Zeca Giaffone	(Brazil) Olimpio Alencar Jr.	(Brazil) Ingo Hoffmann	Equipe Johnson
6	(Rio de Janeiro (state)) Jacarepaguá	20 June	(Brazil) Olimpio Alencar Jr.	(Brazil) Ingo Hoffmann	(Brazil) Zeca Giaffone	Giaffone Motorsport
NC	(Portugal) Estoril	3 July	(Brazil) Paulo Gomes	(Brazil) Ingo Hoffmann	(Brazil) Paulo Gomes	Equipe Coca-Cola Brasil/Polwax
NC	(Portugal) Estoril	18 July	(Brazil) Reinaldo Campello	(Brazil) Ingo Hoffmann	(Brazil) Paulo Gomes	Equipe Coca-Cola Brasil/Polwax
7	(Paraná (state)) Curitiba	8 August	(Brazil) Paulo Gomes	(Brazil) Reinaldo Campello	(Brazil) Zeca Giaffone	Giaffone Motorsport
8	(São Paulo (state)) Interlagos	12 September	(Brazil) Zeca Giaffone	(Brazil) Olimpio Alencar Jr.	(Brazil) Zeca Giaffone	Giaffone Motorsport
9	(São Paulo (state)) Interlagos	17 October	(Brazil) Olimpio Alencar Jr.	(Brazil) Wilson Fittipaldi Júnior	(Brazil) Olimpio Alencar Jr.	Spinelli Racing

=== Championship standings ===
Pos	Drivers	(Rio de Janeiro (state)) RIO1	(Rio de Janeiro (state)) RIO2	(São Paulo (state)) INT1	(São Paulo (state)) INT2	(São Paulo (state)) INT3	(Rio de Janeiro (state)) RIO3	(Portugal) EST1	(Portugal) EST2	(Paraná (state)) CTB	(São Paulo (state)) INT4	(São Paulo (state)) INT5	Pts
1	(Brazil) Olimpio Alencar Jr.	**1**	**1**	**1**	**1**	NL	**2**	7	11	3	Ret	**1**	173
2	(Brazil) Reinaldo Campello	3	12	6	3	10	4	4	**9**	Ret	8	9	169
3	(Brazil) Zeca Giaffone	4	3	7	Ret	**3**	1	11	13	1	**1**	2	156
4	(Brazil) Paulo Gomes	INF	NC	2	2	Ret	3	**1**	1	**Ret**	4	Ret	150
5	(Brazil) Marcos Gracia	5	7	4	6	2	6	14	12	4	5	6	144
6	(Brazil) Wilson Fittipaldi Júnior	2	5	8	5	Ret	Ret	5	DSQ	6	10	8	141
7	(Brazil) Ingo Hoffmann	11	6	5	4	1	5	12	3	Ret	2	21	133
8	(Brazil) Luiz Alberto Pereira	7	4	3	Ret	6	7		NL	2	Ret	5	86
9	(Brazil) Luiz Bueno	10	Ret	16	7	7	8			8	7	3	70
10	(Brazil) Alfredo Guaraná Menezes	12	2			DSQ		13	16	5		Ret	67
11	(Brazil) Chico Serra	18	9	Ret	9	4	9			7	9	13	63
12	(Brazil) Edgar Mello Filho	6	8	10	Ret	NL				Ret			63
13	(Brazil) Julio Tedesco	16	10	11	8	5	Ret			Ret		7	45
14	(Brazil) Paulo Valiengo	8	Ret	Ret	Ret	NL	Ret			14	Ret	10	30
15	(Brazil) Luiz Aladino Osorio										3		26
16	(Brazil) Ricardo Fontanari			9		Ret						4	17
17	(Brazil) Renato Martins	13	15	Ret	10	8	10			9	6	11	13
18	(Brazil) Sérgio Drugovich		11	Ret								DNQ	13
19	(Brazil) Fabio Sotto Mayor	14		12	12	9		3	4		NL	17	11
20	(Brazil) Wagner França	9										14	10
21	(Brazil) Denísio Casarini	DNS			14	Ret	14		10	Ret	11	Ret	10
22	(Brazil) Jorge Cecílio		13	14				8		Ret			9
23	(Brazil) Sidney Alves	17			11	Ret	11			10	12	19	7
24	(Brazil) Clóvis Navarro		16	17		Ret	Ret						6
25	(Brazil) Vanderley de Brito	15	14	15	13	NC	12			12	13	22	6
26	(Brazil) Pedro Rodrigues				Ret		13			11		Ret	5
27	(Brazil) Luiz Carlos Lanzoni									Ret	Ret	12	4
28	(Brazil) Gilberto Hidalgo			13		Ret	Ret			NL			3
29	(Brazil) João Carlos Peixoto							2		13	Ret		3
30	(Brazil) Francisco Martin			Ret						NL	Ret	15	1
31	(Brazil) Eraldo Rosa				INF						Ret	16	0
32	(Brazil) Luís Lara Campos			17				9	5				0
33	(Brazil) Dirceu Raupp Jr.			Ret								18	0
34	(Brazil) José Luís Barrinuevo									NC		20	0
35	(Brazil) Fernando Tradt			NL									0
36	(Brazil) Ricardo Baptista			Ret	Ret								0
37	(Brazil) Rodrigo Mello			Ret									0
38	(Brazil) Mauro Turcatel			DNPQ									0
39	(Brazil) Edmar Ferreira					Ret		Ret	2				0
40	(Brazil) Sylvio de Barros				Ret							INF	0
41	(Brazil) Guilherme Mottur						Ret						0
42	(Brazil) Márcio Mauro			Ret									0
43	(Brazil) Leonardo Sánchez		DNQ										0
Drivers ineligible for points
-	(Portugal) Manuel Fernandes							10	Ret				-
-	(Portugal) João Pedro de Castro							Ret	15				-
-	(Portugal) Cairo Fontes							Ret	6				-
-	(Portugal) Pedro Queiroz Pereira							6	Ret				-
-	(Portugal) Rufino Fontes							Ret	14				-
-	(Portugal) Pedro Villar							15	Ret				-
-	(Portugal) Joaquim Moutinho								7				-
-	(Portugal) Manoel Breyner							Ret	8				-
Pos	Drivers	(Rio de Janeiro (state)) RIO1	(Rio de Janeiro (state)) RIO2	(São Paulo (state)) INT1	(São Paulo (state)) INT2	(São Paulo (state)) INT3	(Rio de Janeiro (state)) RIO3	(Portugal) EST1	(Portugal) EST2	(Paraná (state)) CTB	(São Paulo (state)) INT4	(São Paulo (state)) INT5	Pts

Colour	Result
Gold	Winner
Silver	Second place
Bronze	Third place
Green	Points classification
Blue	Non-points classification
Blue	Non-classified finish (NC)
Purple	Retired, not classified (Ret)
Red	Did not qualify (DNQ)
Red	Did not pre-qualify (DNPQ)
Black	Disqualified (DSQ)
White	Did not start (DNS)
White	Withdrew (WD)
White	Race cancelled (C)
Blank	Did not practice (DNP)
Blank	Did not arrive (DNA)
Blank	Excluded (EX)

**Bold** – Pole position
Italics – Fastest lap
† – Retired, but classified
