= 1979 Stock Car Brasil season =

Car racing competition

The 1979 Stock Car Brasil Championship was the first iteration of the Stock Car Brasil touring car series. The series was created as an alternative to the former Division 1 championship that competed with Chevrolet Opala and Ford Maverick. The season would begin at the Autódromo Internacional de Tarumã on April 22, with José Carlos Palhares taking pole position and Affonso Giaffone Jr. becoming the first winner in the category. The season would then conclude at the Interlagos Circuit in São Paulo in January 25, 1980

Giaffone proved the dominant driver throughout the first half of the season, taking four wins from the first six races. However, a string of inconsistent results allowed Paulo Gomes to usurp him and become the series' maiden championship winner.

== Calendar ==
The following circuits hosted at least one round of the 1979 championship.

Round	Circuit (Event)	Dates	Map
1	Autódromo Internacional de Tarumã; Viamão, Rio Grande do Sul	April 22	1979 Stock Car Brasil season is located in Brazil
2	Autódromo Internacional de Guaporé; Guaporé, Rio Grande do Sul	April 29	1979 Stock Car Brasil season is located in Brazil
3	(São Paulo (state)) Autódromo de Interlagos; São Paulo, São Paulo	May 13	1979 Stock Car Brasil season is located in Brazil
4	(Rio de Janeiro (state)) Autódromo de Jacarepaguá; Jacarepaguá, Rio de Janeiro	May 27	1979 Stock Car Brasil season is located in Brazil
5	Autódromo Internacional de Goiânia; Goiânia, Goiás	June 10	1979 Stock Car Brasil season is located in Brazil
6	(Federal District (Brazil)) Autódromo Internacional de Brasília; Brasília, Distrito Federal	June 17	1979 Stock Car Brasil season is located in Brazil
7	Autódromo Internacional Virgílio Távora; Eusébio, Ceará	July 15	1979 Stock Car Brasil season is located in Brazil
8	(São Paulo (state)) Autódromo de Interlagos; São Paulo, São Paulo	September 30	1979 Stock Car Brasil season is located in Brazil
9	Autódromo Internacional de Tarumã; Viamão, Rio Grande do Sul	October 14	1979 Stock Car Brasil season is located in Brazil
10	Autódromo Internacional de Goiânia; Goiânia, Goiás	October 29	1979 Stock Car Brasil season is located in Brazil
11	(Rio de Janeiro (state)) Autódromo de Jacarepaguá; Jacarepaguá, Rio de Janeiro	November 4	1979 Stock Car Brasil season is located in Brazil
12	(Rio de Janeiro (state)) Autódromo de Jacarepaguá; Jacarepaguá, Rio de Janeiro	November 25	1979 Stock Car Brasil season is located in Brazil
13	(Paraná (state)) Autódromo Internacional de Cascavel; Cascavel, Paraná	December 9	1979 Stock Car Brasil season is located in Brazil
14	(São Paulo (state)) Autódromo de Interlagos; São Paulo, São Paulo	January 25	1979 Stock Car Brasil season is located in Brazil

== Teams and drivers ==
All teams and drivers were Brazilian-registered. All entrants ran the Chevrolet Opala car.

Entrant	Tire	No.	Driver	Rounds
Valvoline Team	C	3	Raul Boesel	All
Valvoline Team	C	77	Paulo Totaro	2
Castrol Racing	M	6	Reinaldo Campello	All
Agip-Blindex Racing	C	7	Julio Tedesco	All
Equipe Johnson	P	12	Ricardo Fontanari	1, 10
Equipe Johnson	P	17	Ingo Hoffmann	2–14
Equipe Havoline-Texaco	P	14	Olimpio Alencar Jr.	All
Equipe Havoline-Texaco	P	97	Leonardo Sánchez	3, 7–8
Macarrão Eme-Gê Autosport	C	15	José Cantanhede	All
Águia Autosport	M	18	Ricardo Baptista	6
Equipe Coca-Cola Brasil	C	22	Paulo Gomes	All
Equipe Coca-Cola Brasil	C	53	Márcio Mauro	2, 7, 12
Caster Competições	P	26	Luiz Alberto Pereira	All
Caster Competições	P	38	Nelson Lacerda	2–14
Boettger Competições	C	35	Edgar Mello Filho	2–14
Boettger Competições	C	82	Mauro Turcatel	All
Spinelli Racing	C	37	Walter Spinelli	All
Spinelli Racing	C	93	Joannis Likoroupoulos	2–14
Fabidan Company	C	39	Camilo Christófaro Jr	All
Carretas FG Racing	B	40	Sylvio de Barros	5–6, 9–14
Carretas FG Racing	B	99	Marciano Testa	2–14
Team Metalpó-Combustol	C	42	Alfredo Guaraná Menezes	All
Bastos Racing Team	C	45	Carlos Eduardo Andrade	All
Team Metalpó	B	54	Mauro Sá Motta	2–14
Team Metalpó	B	74	Guilherme Mottur	4, 6, 8
WB Motorsports	P	56	José Moraes Neto	All
WB Motorsports	P	79	Sidney Alves	All
Verde e Amarelo Motorsport	C	62	José Luiz Nogueira	All
Ashford Motorsports	P	65	Fernando Tradt	12
Net Oz SuperAuto	P	68	René de Nigris	2–14
Benson & Hedges Racing	C	70	Paulo Valiengo	2–14
Charm Equipe	M	71	Rodrigo Mello	3
Renocap Team	P	76	Walter Travaglini	All
Camel Grand Prix	C	80	João Carlos Palhares	All
Chesterfield Racing	B	81	Luiz Aladino Osorio	All
Giaffone Motorsport	M	89	Affonso Giaffone Jr.	All
Giaffone Motorsport	M	91	Zeca Giaffone	All
Dimep Grand Prix	C	92	Arthur Bragantini	2–14

== Results and standings ==
=== Season summary ===
Round	Circuit	Date	Pole position	Fastest lap	Winning driver	Winning team
1	(Rio Grande do Sul) Tarumã	22 April	(Brazil) João Carlos Palhares	(Brazil) Affonso Giaffone Jr.	(Brazil) Affonso Giaffone Jr.	Giaffone Motorsport
2	(Rio Grande do Sul) Guaporé	29 April	(Brazil) Affonso Giaffone Jr.	(Brazil) Affonso Giaffone Jr.	(Brazil) Affonso Giaffone Jr.	Giaffone Motorsport
3	(São Paulo (state)) Interlagos	13 May	(Brazil) Affonso Giaffone Jr.	(Brazil) Affonso Giaffone Jr.	(Brazil) Affonso Giaffone Jr.	Giaffone Motorsport
4	(Rio de Janeiro (state)) Jacarepaguá	27 May	(Brazil) Zeca Giaffone	(Brazil) Affonso Giaffone Jr.	(Brazil) Zeca Giaffone	Giaffone Motorsport
5	(Goiás) Goiânia	10 June	(Brazil) Olimpio Alencar Jr.	(Brazil) Raul Boesel	(Brazil) Olimpio Alencar Jr.	Equipe Havoline-Texaco
6	(Federal District (Brazil)) Brasília	17 June	(Brazil) Paulo Gomes	(Brazil) Ingo Hoffmann	(Brazil) Affonso Giaffone Jr.	Giaffone Motorsport
7	(Ceará) Virgílio Távora	15 July	(Brazil) Olimpio Alencar Jr.	(Brazil) Paulo Gomes	(Brazil) Olimpio Alencar Jr.	Equipe Havoline-Texaco
8	(São Paulo (state)) Interlagos	30 September	(Brazil) Paulo Gomes	(Brazil) Paulo Gomes	(Brazil) Paulo Gomes	Equipe Coca-Cola Brasil
9	(Rio Grande do Sul) Tarumã	14 October	(Brazil) Olimpio Alencar Jr.	(Brazil) Julio Tedesco	(Brazil) Raul Boesel	Valvoline Team
10	(Goiás) Goiânia	29 October	(Brazil) Raul Boesel	(Brazil) Raul Boesel	(Brazil) Raul Boesel	Valvoline Team
11	(Rio de Janeiro (state)) Jacarepaguá	4 November	(Brazil) Paulo Gomes	(Brazil) João Carlos Palhares	(Brazil) Olimpio Alencar Jr.	Equipe Havoline-Texaco
12	(Rio de Janeiro (state)) Jacarepaguá	25 November	(Brazil) Olimpio Alencar Jr.	(Brazil) Raul Boesel	(Brazil) Paulo Gomes	Equipe Coca-Cola Brasil
13	(Paraná (state)) Cascavel	9 December	(Brazil) Zeca Giaffone	(Brazil) Olimpio Alencar Jr.	(Brazil) Raul Boesel	Valvoline Team
14	(São Paulo (state)) Interlagos	25 January	(Brazil) Paulo Gomes	(Brazil) Paulo Gomes	(Brazil) Paulo Gomes	Equipe Coca-Cola Brasil

=== Championship standings ===
Pos	Driver	(Rio Grande do Sul) TAR1	(Rio Grande do Sul) GUA	(São Paulo (state)) INT1	(Rio de Janeiro (state)) RIO1	(Goiás) GOI1	(Federal District (Brazil)) BRA	(Ceará) VIR	(São Paulo (state)) INT2	(Rio Grande do Sul) TAR2	(Goiás) GOI2	(Rio de Janeiro (state)) RIO2	(Rio de Janeiro (state)) RIO3	(Paraná (state)) CAS	(São Paulo (state)) INT3	Pts
1	(Brazil) Paulo Gomes	7	4	2	2	5	3	5	1	5	Ret	2	1	Ret	1	212
2	(Brazil) Olimpio Alencar Jr.	3	5	6	6	1	19	**1**	4	8	4	1	3	21	14	158
3	(Brazil) Affonso Giaffone Jr.	1	1	1	3	4	1	2	28†	11	7	**3**	5	2	13	157
4	(Brazil) Raul Boesel	6	2	4	17	**3**	6	3	15	**1**	1	5	21	1	11	141
5	(Brazil) Zeca Giaffone	Ret	16	3	1	6	15	6	27†	Ret	27	8	6	5	5	98
6	(Brazil) João Carlos Palhares	**2**	6	Ret	15	26	17	7	5	4	5	4	4	**13**	9	97
7	(Brazil) Ingo Hoffmann		Ret	**Ret**	7	7	2	9	Ret	3	3	21	Ret	6	3	90
8	(Brazil) Mauro Sá Motta		21	Ret	12	9	5	4	2	7	2	7	7	10	6	78
9	(Brazil) Sidney Alves	10	9	7	9	16	11	14	7	9	6	6	2	3	8	67
10	(Brazil) Walter Spinelli	5	8	Ret	18	2	4	19	12	2	24	9	Ret	14	21	57
11	(Brazil) Reinaldo Campello	NC	17	9	5	14	25	8	3	16	9	12	19	7	2	41
12	(Brazil) Carlos Eduardo Andrade	8	3	18	24†	11	8	18	19	14	12	19	Ret	Ret	15	36
13	(Brazil) Paulo Valiengo		19	14	4	10	12	17	21	27†	17	17	11	4	4	34
14	(Brazil) Luiz Aladino Osorio	4	7	10	Ret	15	10	11	6	28†	19	10	12	Ret	28†	20
15	(Brazil) José Luiz Nogueira	13	13	5	20	13	Ret	22	20	19	10	20	14	17	27†	10
16	(Brazil) Walter Travaglini	11	10	19	10	12	14	13	10	6	Ret	18	9	16	12	8
17	(Brazil) Julio Tedesco		Ret	15	Ret	Ret	23	16	8	15	13	27	18	8	7	7
18	(Brazil) Alfredo Guaraná Menezes	14	11	Ret	16	8	7	15	9	Ret	20	22	22†	Ret	18	6
19	(Brazil) José Cantanhede	15	14	12	8	22	26	26	13	10	8	13	Ret	9	10	5
20	(Brazil) Camilo Christófaro Jr	12	24	8	14	21	Ret	10	Ret	26	16	Ret	15	Ret	DNS	5
21	(Brazil) Marciano Testa		Ret	13	22	20	Ret	12	11	18	22	15	10	Ret	19	4
22	(Brazil) Arthur Bragantini		Ret	17	13	19	16	Ret	18	22	25	26	Ret	15	17	2
23	(Brazil) Luiz Alberto Pereira	9	Ret	20†	Ret	18	18	24	24	17	18	24	Ret	20	20	2
24	(Brazil) Nelson Lacerda		15	Ret	Ret	Ret	22	25	16	20	Ret	11	8	11	29†	1
25	(Brazil) René de Nigris		20	21†	21	17	9	27	17	12	11	29	Ret	12	16	0
26	(Brazil) Joannis Likoroupoulos		22	11	11	23	20	23	22	21	15	23	17	22	24	0
27	(Brazil) José Moraes Neto	16	12	Ret	Ret	24	Ret	20	14	13	23	25	13	18	26	0
28	(Brazil) Edgar Mello Filho		18	DNS	19	27	13	21	26	23	14	14	16	19	22	0
29	(Brazil) Mauro Turcatel	Ret	23	16	23	25	24	Ret	25	24	26	28	20	23	25	0
30	(Brazil) Sylvio de Barros					28	21			25	21	16	Ret	Ret	23	0
31	(Brazil) Márcio Mauro		Ret					Ret								0
32	(Brazil) Leonardo Sánchez			DSQ				Ret	23							0
33	(Brazil) Ricardo Fontanari	Ret									Ret					0
34	(Brazil) Guilherme Mottur				DNQ		DNQ		Ret							0
35	(Brazil) Paulo Totaro		Ret													0
36	(Brazil) Ricardo Baptista						Ret									0
37	(Brazil) Fernando Tradt												Ret			0
38	(Brazil) Rodrigo Mello			Ret												0
Pos	Driver	(Rio Grande do Sul) TAR1	(Rio Grande do Sul) GUA	(São Paulo (state)) INT1	(Rio de Janeiro (state)) RIO1	(Goiás) GOI1	(Federal District (Brazil)) BRA	(Ceará) VIR	(São Paulo (state)) INT2	(Rio Grande do Sul) TAR2	(Goiás) GOI2	(Rio de Janeiro (state)) RIO2	(Rio de Janeiro (state)) RIO3	(Paraná (state)) CAS	(São Paulo (state)) INT3	Pts

Colour	Result
Gold	Winner
Silver	Second place
Bronze	Third place
Green	Points classification
Blue	Non-points classification
Blue	Non-classified finish (NC)
Purple	Retired, not classified (Ret)
Red	Did not qualify (DNQ)
Red	Did not pre-qualify (DNPQ)
Black	Disqualified (DSQ)
White	Did not start (DNS)
White	Withdrew (WD)
White	Race cancelled (C)
Blank	Did not practice (DNP)
Blank	Did not arrive (DNA)
Blank	Excluded (EX)

**Bold** – Pole position
Italics – Fastest lap
† – Retired, but classified
