= Vanzella =

Vanzella may refer to:

- Ale Vanzella, Brazilian musician
- Flavio Vanzella, Italian cyclist
- Patricia Maria Vanzella, Brazilian pianist and professor of music
