= Guaporé =

Guaporé may refer to:

- Guaporé River, in Brazil and Bolivia
- Guaporé, Rio Grande do Sul, a municipality in Brazil
- Federal Territory of Guaporé, predecessor to the state of Rondônia in Brazil
