= Autódromo de Deodoro =

Proposed race track in Rio de Janeiro, Brazil

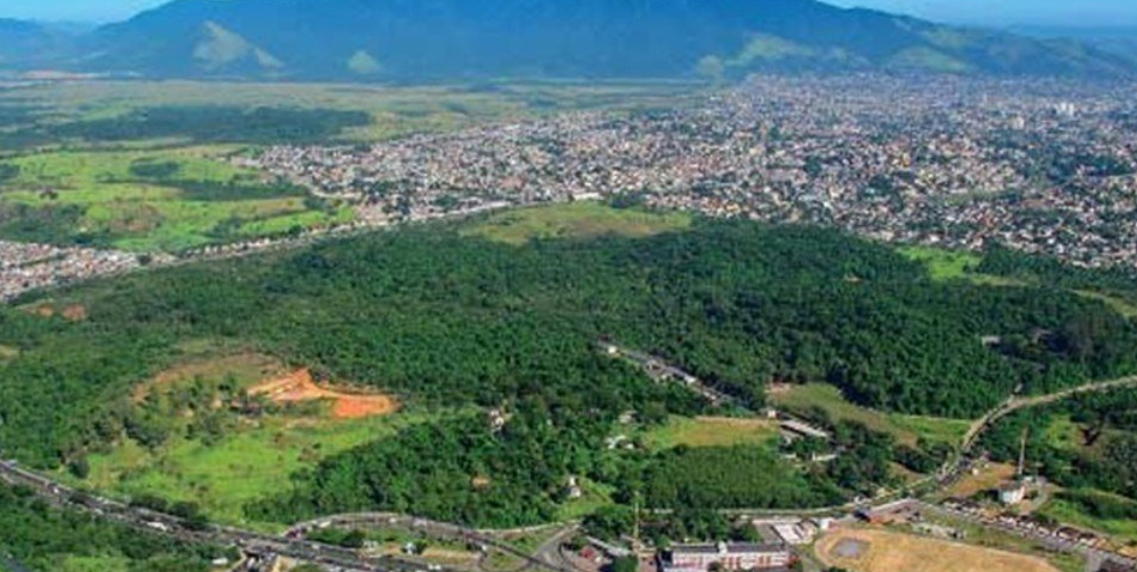
- Location: Rio de Janeiro, Brazil
- Major events: Brazilian Grand Prix (proposed)

Autódromo de Deodoro was a proposed motorsport circuit in Rio de Janeiro, Brazil. It was to be built in the neighborhood of Deodoro, in substitution to the Autódromo Internacional Nelson Piquet, which in 2012 was decommissioned and demolished for works of the 2016 Summer Olympics. However, it was discarded by the Rio de Janeiro city government in 2021.

== History ==
=== 2012 ===
The initial forecast was for construction to begin and end in 2012, however, in December 2011, the Legal Department of the Brazilian Confederation of Motor Vehicles (CBA) requested the challenge of the edict of construction of the Barra Olympic Park in the field of the Autodromo International Nelson Piquet, in Jacarepaguá. According to the entity, the use of the area for the construction was conditioned to the construction and delivery of a new autodrome of international standard. In January 2012, the court upheld the CBA's request and suspended the bidding process.

In May 2012, after a meeting in Brasília between CBA president Cleyton Pinteiro and representatives of the Federal Government, Rio de Janeiro State Government and City Hall, it was decided that the construction of the racetrack would begin in January 2013. In July, however, a security problem was raised. The location chosen (a military area that had not been used for a long time) could hide mines, grenades and bombs. So that the work could only begin after the completion of the investigations to the ground, proving the security of the place.

=== 2019 ===
In May 2019, the President of the Republic, the Governor of Rio de Janeiro, and the Mayor of Rio announced that the Formula 1 Brazilian Grand Prix would take place in Rio de Janeiro in 2020. The President signed a cooperation agreement with the state government and the city hall for the construction of the Autódromo de Deodoro, which was expected to have a capacity to accommodate an audience of 130,000 people.

The Army ceded the land where the racetrack was to be built. Rio Motorpark (formerly Rio Motorsports) won the bid from the city hall to negotiate with Liberty Media (owner of F1) the construction of the racetrack in Rio de Janeiro. After several problems obtaining environmental licenses, which were not released during the expected period, construction became unfeasible in 2020.

=== 2021 ===
In November 2020, Liberty Media released the 2021 calendar with a race in the country, at the Interlagos Circuit in São Paulo. The São Paulo State Government confirmed a five-year partnership, and in December the contract was signed with the São Paulo City Hall and Liberty Media; the event would be called the São Paulo Grand Prix.

Rio de Janeiro's mayor-elect Eduardo Paes has ruled out building the racetrack in the Deodoro neighborhood, in the Camboatá forest, due to political agreements; he will evaluate another location for the racetrack's construction.

In February 2021, the Rio de Janeiro city government officially abandoned the Deodoro site as an option for the Rio race track.

The Rio de Janeiro City Council unanimously approved the transformation of the Camboatá Forest into a Wildlife Refuge (REVIS), ending the possibility of building a racetrack on the site.
