= Deodoro, Rio de Janeiro =

Deodoro
- Neighborhood
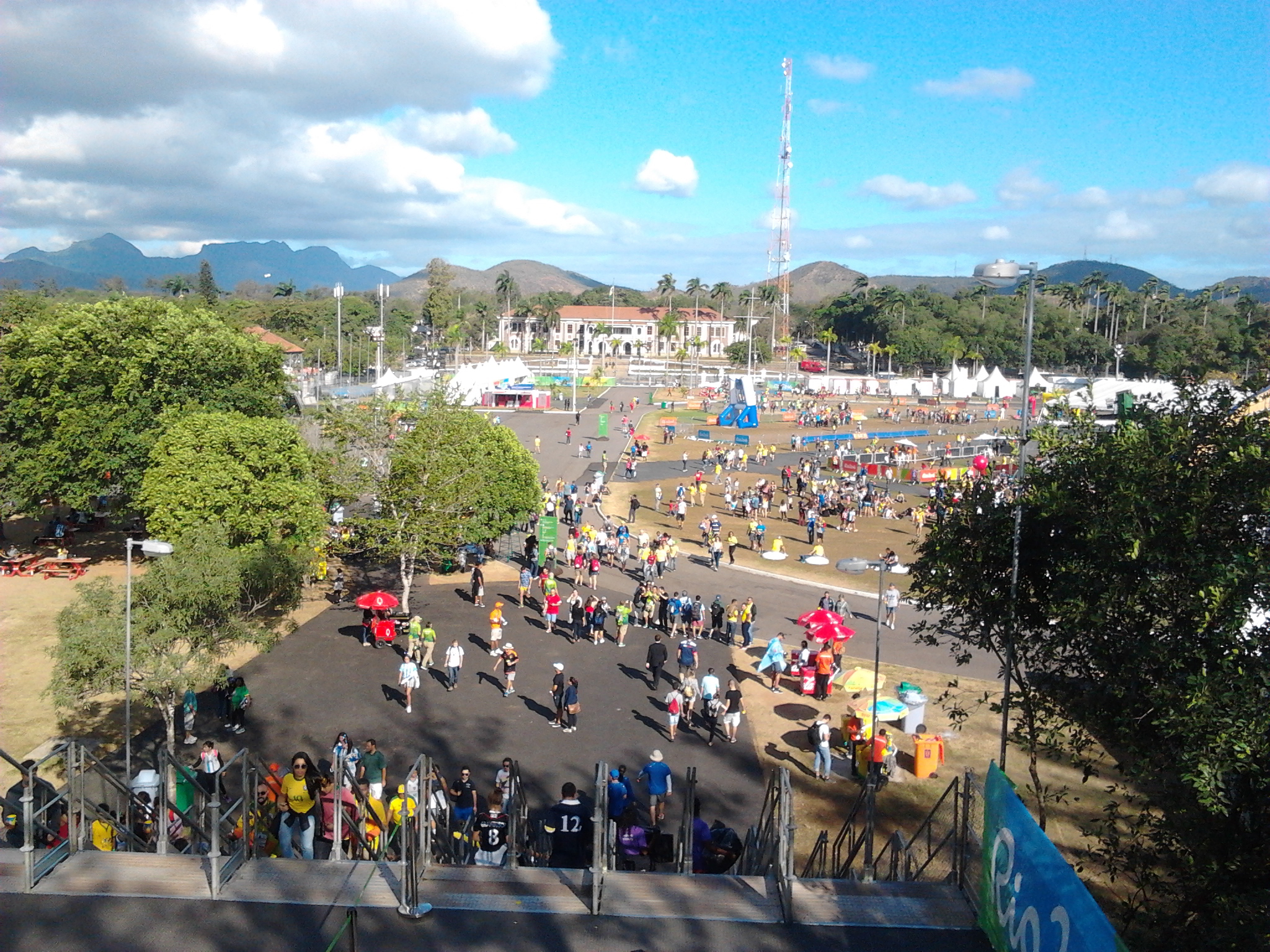

- Location in Rio de Janeiro Deodoro (Brazil)
- Coordinates: 22°51′18″S 43°23′07″W
- Country: Brazil
- State: Rio de Janeiro (RJ)
- Municipality/City: Rio de Janeiro
- Zone: West Zone

Area
  - Total: 46,405 ha (114,670 acres)

Population (2010)
  - Total: 10 842

Deodoro is a neighborhood of the West Zone of Rio de Janeiro, Brazil. Deodoro was one of four venue locations for the 2016 Summer Olympics, along with Barra da Tijuca, Copacabana, and Maracanã.

== See also ==
- Autódromo de Deodoro
