= Ale Vanzella =

Brazilian musician (born 1984)

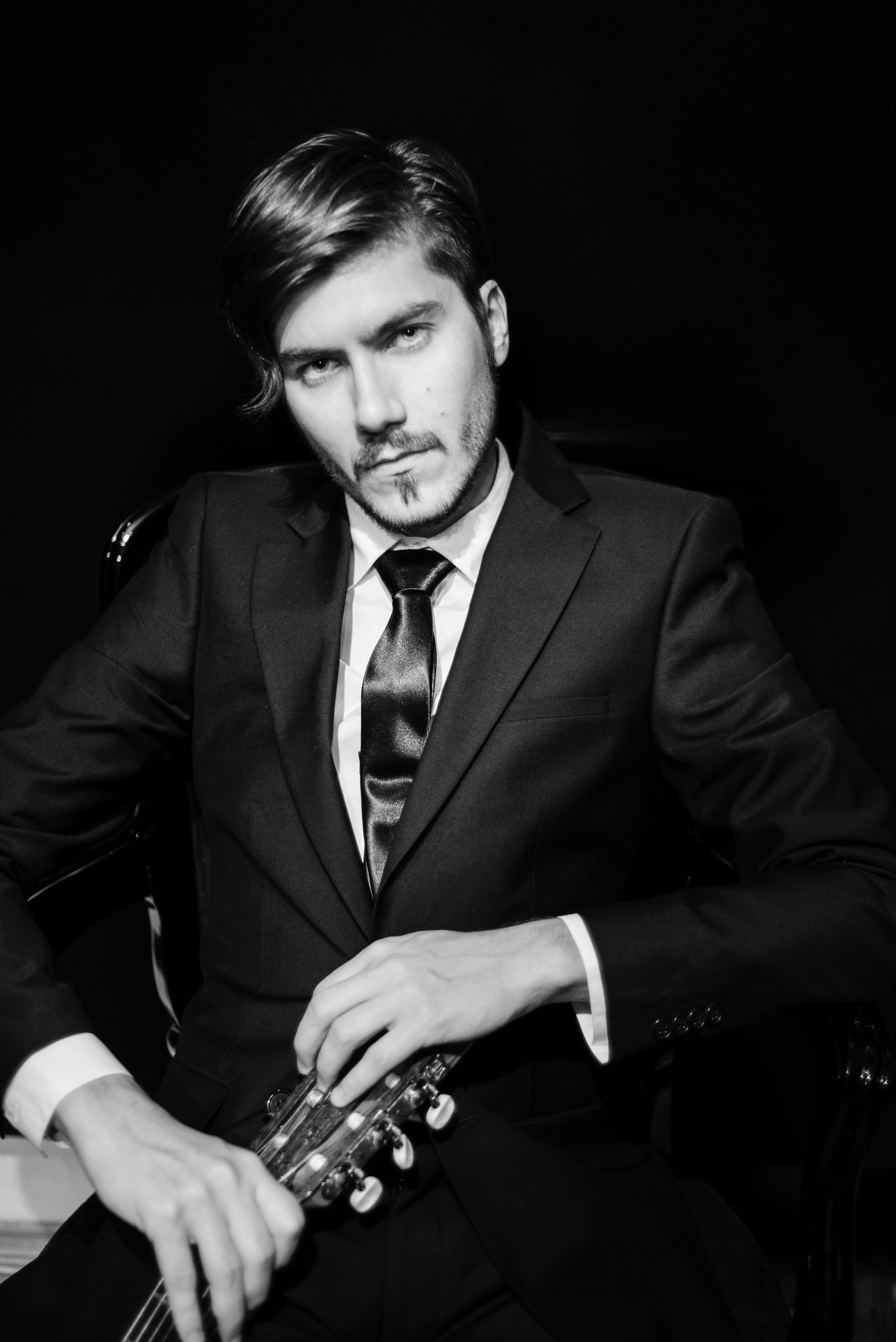

Background information
- Born: Alessandro Osmar Pilot Vanzella; February 5, 1984 (age 41)
- Origin: Guaporé, Rio Grande do Sul, Brazil
- Genres: Bossa Nova, indie rock
- Occupations: Singer, guitarist
- Instruments: Vocal, Acoustic Guitar, Guitar, Drums
- Years active: 2012 - present
- Website: www.alevanzella.com

Ale Vanzella (born February 5, 1984) is a Brazilian musician who mixes bossa nova with indie rock. He is originally from Guaporé in the southern state of Rio Grande do Sul in Brazil.

== Biography ==
Vanzella began playing in indie and grunge rock bands at the age of 14. He worked as a university professor of accounting before pursuing music full-time, having graduated from UNIVATES in Accounting Sciences in 2006 and completing postgraduate work as a comptroller (2007) and in tax law (2012).

Vanzella has been influenced by bossa nova musicians João Gilberto, Roberto Menescal, Tom Jobim, Vinicius de Moraes, Toquinho, and Walter Santos, as well as by indie rock groups Nirvana, The Strokes, The Killers, Interpol, The Kinks, Foo Fighters, and Arcade Fire.

== Connection with Bossa Nova ==
Roberto Menescal, one of the founders of the bossa nova movement, collaborated on Vanzella's debut album Indie Bossa and concert tour, supporting the mix of styles. He writes of Vanzella: "What surprised me most in this work was the softness of Ale. I remember that João Gilberto appeared so, he opened an opportunity at the time. And Ale can open this new door." Roberto Menescal in 2012

== Tours and Projects ==
The Indie Bossa album was released in 2012, and was supported by a pre-release tour in the United States. A tour of Japan occurred in May 2012. A European tour in May and June 2012 included stops in Spain, Portugal, France, Germany, England and Italy.

Vanzella was chosen by FIFA to appear in a documentary about Brazilian culture corresponding with the 2014 FIFA World Cup being held in Brazil.

== Discography ==
- Indie Bossa (Albatroz Music/July 2012) Includes 17 tracks in Portuguese and English, and a bonus track in Japanese.
- Indie Bossa II (Sony Music/April 2015) Includes 12 tracks in English.
