= Guaporé, Rio Grande do Sul =

Municipality of Rio Grande do Sul, Brazil

Guaporé
- Municipality
- The Municipality of Guaporé
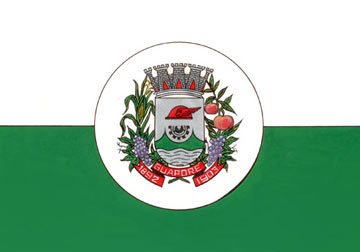
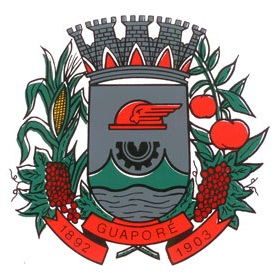
- Flag Coat of arms
- Nickname: Capital of hospitality
- Location in Rio Grande do Sul

- Location in Brazil
- Coordinates: 28°50′45″S 51°53′24″W
- Country: Brazil
- Region: South
- State: Rio Grande do Sul
- Founded: 11 December 1903

Government
  - Mayor: Odair André Rossetto (PODE)

Area
  - Total: 297.661 km^{2} (114.928 sq mi)
- IBGE/2002
- Elevation: 478 m (1,568 ft)

Population (2020)
  - Total: 25,968
  - Density: 76.63/km^{2} (198.5/sq mi)
- Time zone: UTC−3 (BRT)
- Postal Code: 99200-000
- Area code: +55 54
- Website: www.guapore.rs.gov.br

Guaporé is a Brazilian municipality located in the state of Rio Grande do Sul. It is the state's greatest jewelry and lingerie producer, ranking second in the country. The city was mainly colonized by Italian immigrants in the 19th century and still retains their traditions. The name comes from the Guaraní language and its meaning is disputed, most likely being Desert Valley.

== History ==
The immigrant settlement that would eventually give birth to the city began in the early 19th century in the area that is the present-day municipality of Muçum, a smaller number of German cattle herders also established themselves in the area now known as São Valentim do Sul, both towns that used to be part of Guaporé.

In 1892 the colony of Guaporé was established, on area belonging to the cities of Lajeado and Passo Fundo. The colony's manager, Eng. José Montauri de Aguiar Leitão, designated to Eng. Vespasiano Corrêa the task of zoning and dividing the town's area in some 5000 shares of 0.25 to 0.30 km^{2}. Soon after, settlers from the first Italian colonies in the state (mainly Caxias do Sul, Bento Gonçalves and Veranópolis) came to the newly formed town and, in 1896, the colony had already reached 7,000 inhabitants.

In 1897 the Santo Antônio Parish was created, under the Porto Alegre Diocese, being an important step the formation of a city in local culture. By 1900 the population had grown to 13,727. This success led to the formal establishment, on 11 December 1903, of the Municipality of Guaporé, with Eng. Vespasiano Rodrigues Corrêa as the first mayor, inaugurated on 1 January 1904.

By 1910, Guaporé had around 30,000 inhabitants, even more than today, with 1,020 living in the town center, which had over 170 buildings, a town square, telegraph, post office and church. Agriculture was the most important economical activity, the main crops being rice, beans, corn, soy, orange and vines. Furthermore, 82 businesses and a few industries were established by the time, producing aguardente, wine, cheese and lard.

Through the years, several districts emancipated from Guaporé, significantly reducing the city's area and population. Today, several municipalities make up what was once Guaporé, the largest being Casca (emancipated in 1954), Muçum (1959), Serafina Corrêa (1960) and Dois Lajeados (1987), among many others.

=== The immigrants ===
Upon their arrival, throughout the 19th century, the immigrants were devoid of anything of value and had to rely on their strong will and bold spirits to build a new life on a new land. With over a century gone by, the memory of these origins is still felt in the religious strength and willingness to work of the community. The religious passion is clearly seen in the numerous chapels on rural areas and the Central Church, built in Neogothic style between 1943 and 1950. The city also has a 13 m (43 ft) Christ statue placed on a 7 m (23 ft) pedestal on the city's tallest mountain.

In 1907, with the arrival of the Pasqualli family to the city, the industry that would become an economical backbone had its humble beginnings as they applied their goldsmith knowledge to become the first jewellers established in Guaporé.

Over a hundred years after its foundation, Guaporé has set itself as an important commercial, industrial, cultural and touristic centre for dozens of cities in the region.

== Geography ==
Guaporé is located on the Serra Gaúcha a mountainous area of the north-eastern Rio Grande do Sul. The city center is at an altitude of 478 m (1,568 ft) above sea level, although some peaks reach the 700 m (2,300 ft) mark. It is situated between the highlands of the Planalto and lowlands of the Depressão Central and is composed of Igneous rock formed in the end of the Mesozoic Era. It is in an area of Basaltic Rock, that lay's upon layers of Arenite and Granite. The rivers Carreiro and Guaporé flow on the eastern and western borders of the city, respectively.

=== Climate ===
Due to its location, Guaporé is subject to a Humid subtropical climate, summers are cool and winters are moderately cold, with common occurrence of frost and occasional snowfall.

== Statistics ==
Below are some available figures on the city's economy and life.

- GDP: R$ 323,682,673 ^{IBGE/2008}
- GDP per capita: R$ 14468.20 ^{IBGE/2008}
- Total Exports: US$ 18,509,548 FOB ^{2008}
- HDI: 0.826 ^{high UNDP/2000}
- Illiteracy: 6.48% ^{2000}
- Life expectancy: 73.84 years ^{2000}
- Infant mortality rate: 3.83 ^{2007}

== Culture ==
In addition to the Italian majority, there is significant presence of German and Polish descendants, as well as other European nationalities. Despite generations of foreign influence, those of Italian descent still maintain several traditions including the use of the Talian dialect, itself derived from the Venetian language, an Italian dialect. Furthermore, the cold winters gave rise to the tradition of gathering family and friends around wood-burning-stoves (used for heating and cooking) to eat pine nuts, chat and play cards. Typical Italian cousine is very common and served in any occasion. Hunting and fishing, once important sources of sustenance, have now become usual pastime sports.

The Gaucho culture has also found its way into peoples lives over time. Nowadays the tradition of drinking chimarrão is very widespread, and public celebrations of the Ragamuffin War are held every year in the central square, usually on the week leading up to the state holiday of September 20.

== Tourism ==
The city has always attracted tourists from many places and for many different reasons, be it shopping tourism, racing enthusiasts, railway fans, religious people or even those simply attracted by the small town charm.

Main tourist attractions include:

- Igreja Matriz de Santo Antônio – city's central church built in French Neogothic style starting in 1947. The church was designed by the Italian Tiziano Bettanin.
- Christ the Redeemer Statue – The 13 m-tall (43 ft) statue is placed on a 7 m (23 ft) pedestal on top of a 741 m (2,431 ft) peak west of the city centre. Every year, on Good Friday, thousands march up the mountain in honour of Christ's sacrifice.
- Guaporé Commercial Center – With dozens of Jewellery and Lingerie shops, it attracts tourists from all over on the look for new items and low prices. Official Site(in Portuguese)
- Vespasiano Corrêa Square – Central square in the center of town, bordered by the Santo Antônio Church, City Hall and the city's main streets.
- Autódromo Internacional de Guaporé – Racetrack that has always offered entertainment to the local population and numerous tourists. The main event is the yearly leg of the Formula Truck championship, a Brazilian Truck Racing competition.
- Kartódromo – Kart track by the aforementioned racetrack.
- Ferrovia do Trigo (Wheat Railway) – Railway built in the 60s and 70s to complete the connection of the whole north-east of the state to the capital. The mountainous terrain ensued in the construction of over 20 viaducts and bridges as well as several tunnels of up to 2 km in length. Every year, many enthusiasts walk these rails in order to catch a glimpse of the amazing and beautiful engineering works.

== Sport and leisure ==
Many locations are available to the population for practising sports and other leisure activities. Football fields are spread throughout the city and many locals have some sort of countryside retreat for the weekends. Other sport and leisure options include:

- Autódromo Internacional de Guaporé – Aside from the many races held in the local motorsports circuit over the whole year, the area still holds a kart racing track, a swimming pool, a camping area, and facilities for the traditional Sunday barbecues and other activities.
- AFAG - Caça e Pesca – Offers areas for fishing, shooting sports, camping, and off-road motorcycling.
- AABB (Banco do Brasil Athletic Association) – With a football field and facilities for parties and other events, the usually members-only location is also rented for private occasions.
- Clube União Guaporense – The old building by the central square hosts a restaurant and ballroom used for celebrations. Swimming pools, tennis courts, and snooker and card playing tables are also available for members.
- Guaporé Aerodrome – (ICAO: SSGR) The airfield's 1,100 m gravel runway is occasionally used by light aircraft.

== Notable people ==
- Renato Gaúcho: retired football player, having played for clubs such as Esportivo, Grêmio, Flamengo, Botafogo and Fluminense, currently coaches Grêmio.
- Ale Vanzella: bossa nova / indie rock musician

== See also ==
- List of municipalities in Rio Grande do Sul
