= Paulo Gomes (racing driver) =

Brazilian racing driver

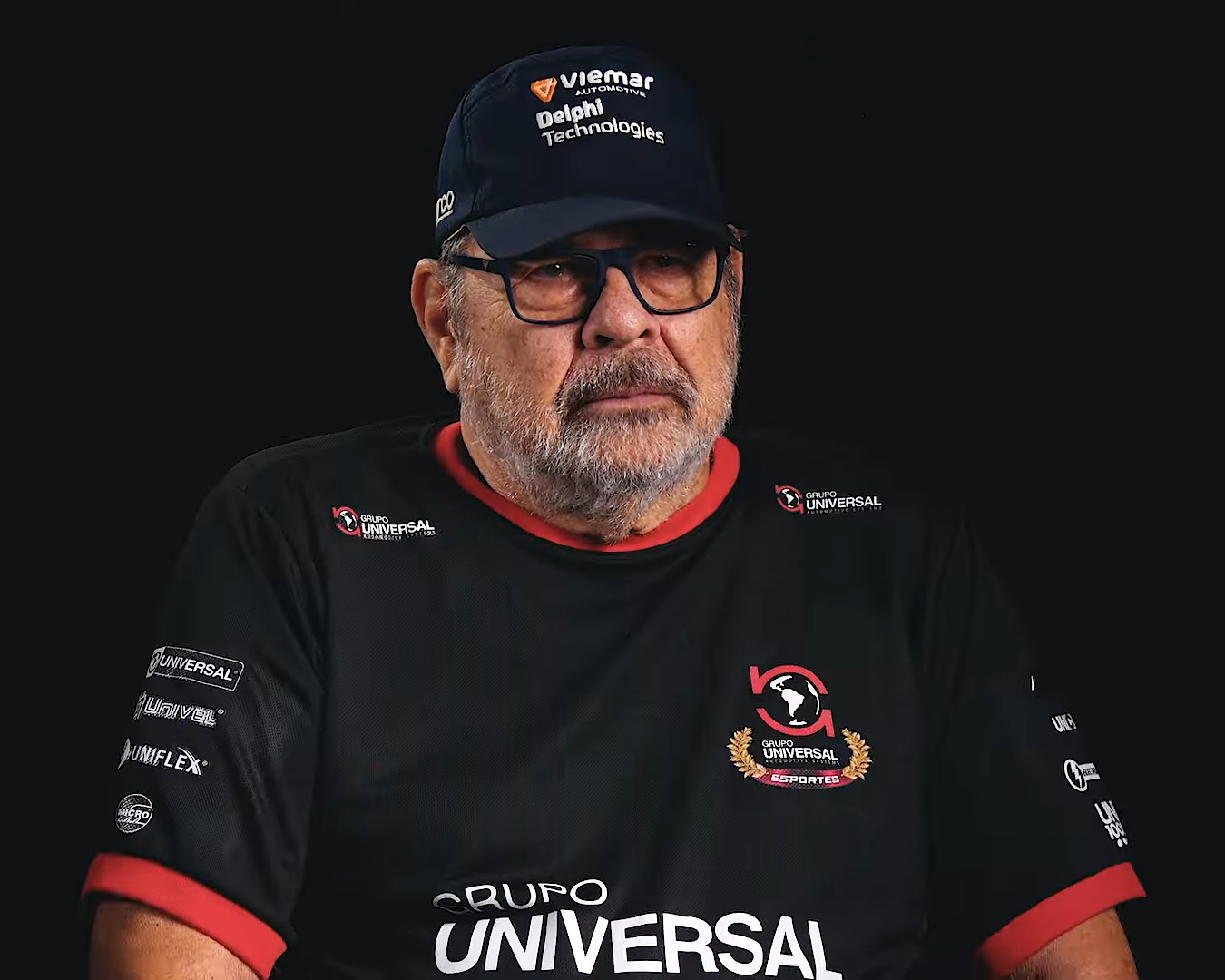
Image of Paulo Gomes

Paulo de Melo Gomes (born April 14, 1948 in Ribeirão Preto) is a retired Brazilian racing driver. He won the Stock Car Brasil in 1979, 1983, 1984 and 1995.

Gomes competed in Stock Car Brasil from 1979 to 2003. In 2007, he returned briefly to compete in the last six races before retiring.

Gomes is father of Marcos Gomes and Pedro Gomes, both of whom are also racing drivers.
