= Autódromo Internacional Nelson Piquet =

Motorsport venue in Rio de Janeiro, Brazil

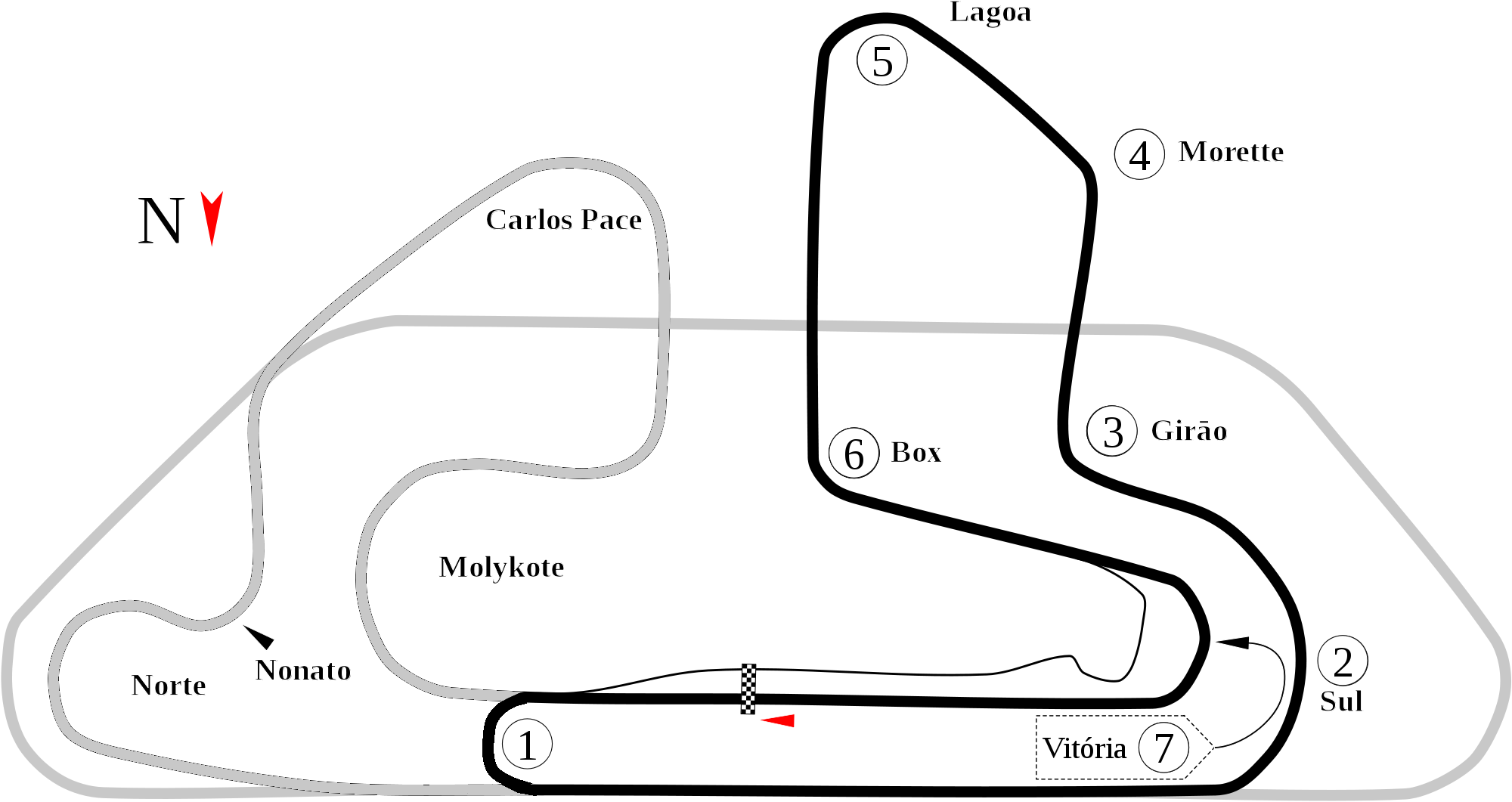
- Short Circuit (1996–2012)
- Location: Rio de Janeiro, Brazil
- Coordinates: 22°58′32″S 43°23′42″W
- Capacity: 90,000
- Broke ground: January 1971; 55 years ago
- Opened: 27 January 1978; 48 years ago
- Closed: November 2012; 14 years ago
- Former names: Autódromo de Jacarepaguá (1978–1987)
- Major events: Formula One; Brazilian Grand Prix (1978, 1981–1989); CART; Rio 200 (1996–2000); Grand Prix motorcycle racing Rio de Janeiro motorcycle Grand Prix (1995–2004); Stock Car Brasil (1979–2012); Campeonato Brasiliero de GT (2008–2012); Porsche Cup Brasil (2007–2011); Stock Car Corrida do Milhão (2008); F3 Sudamericana (1989–1992, 1997, 1999–2000, 2002–2005, 2008–2009, 2011–2012)

Short Circuit (1996–2012)
- Surface: Asphalt
- Length: 3.336 km (2.073 mi)
- Turns: 7
- Race lap record: 1:06.756 ( (Brazil) Leonardo Cordeiro, Dallara F309, 2009, F3)

Modified Grand Prix Circuit (1996–2005)
- Surface: Asphalt
- Length: 4.933 km (3.065 mi)
- Turns: 13
- Race lap record: 1:43.275 ( (Brazil) Alberto Valerio, Dallara F301, 2005, F3)

Emerson Fittipaldi Speedway (1996–2005)
- Surface: Asphalt
- Length: 3.000 km (1.864 mi)
- Turns: 4
- Race lap record: 38.891 ( (Colombia) Juan Pablo Montoya, Reynard 99I, 1999, CART)

Original Grand Prix Circuit (1978–1995)
- Surface: Asphalt
- Length: 5.031 km (3.126 mi)
- Turns: 11
- Race lap record: 1:32.507 ( (Italy) Riccardo Patrese, Williams FW12C, 1989, F1)

The Autódromo Internacional Nelson Piquet (Nelson Piquet International Racetrack), also known as Jacarepaguá after the neighbourhood in which it was located, and also as the Autódromo Riocentro, was a motorsport circuit in Rio de Janeiro, Brazil. Opened in January 1978, a few weeks before the 1978 Brazilian Grand Prix, it hosted the Formula One Brazilian Grand Prix on ten occasions, and was also used for CART, motorcycle racing and stock car racing. In 2012, it was demolished to make way for facilities to be used at the 2016 Summer Olympics.

== The original circuit ==
The original circuit was built between 1971 and 1977 on the site of the Barra da Tijuca road course, which had itself been built on reclaimed marshland and was operational from 1964 to 1970. It was a relatively flat circuit, with a long pit straight and a longer back straight (which allowed the turbo-engined Formula One cars of the mid-1980s to reach speeds of 300 km/h (190 mph), and numerous mid-speed to slow-speed corners with plenty of room for overtaking. The maximum spectator capacity was 90,000 with the bulk of the spectators housed in giant grandstands that spanned almost the length of the back straight giving something very rare in Formula One, views of the entire track. With the exception of the 1978 race, the Formula One Grands Prix were held in March or April, in Rio's very hot and humid tropical early autumn weather.

=== Formula One ===
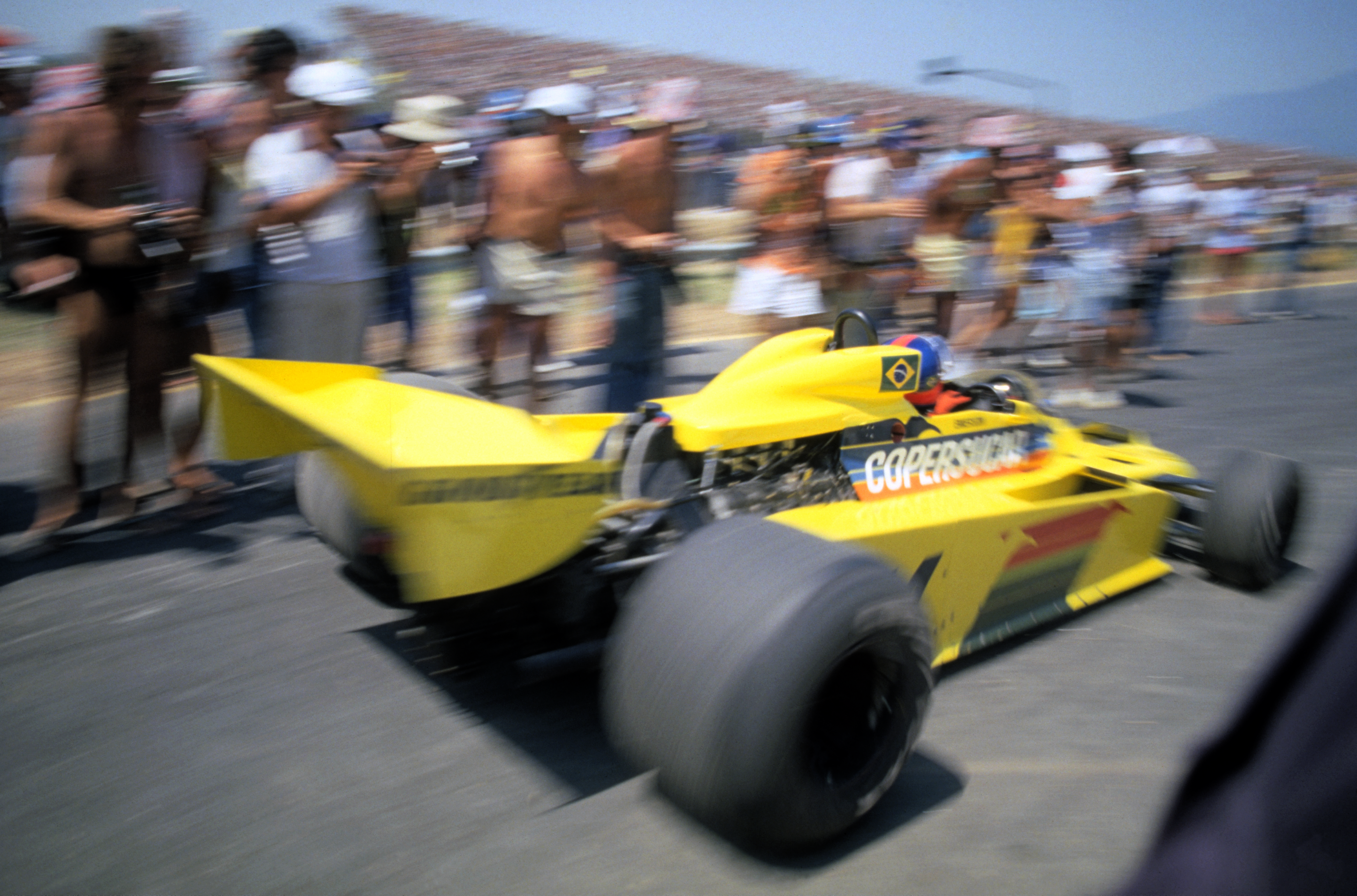
Emerson Fittipaldi at Jacarepaguá in 1978

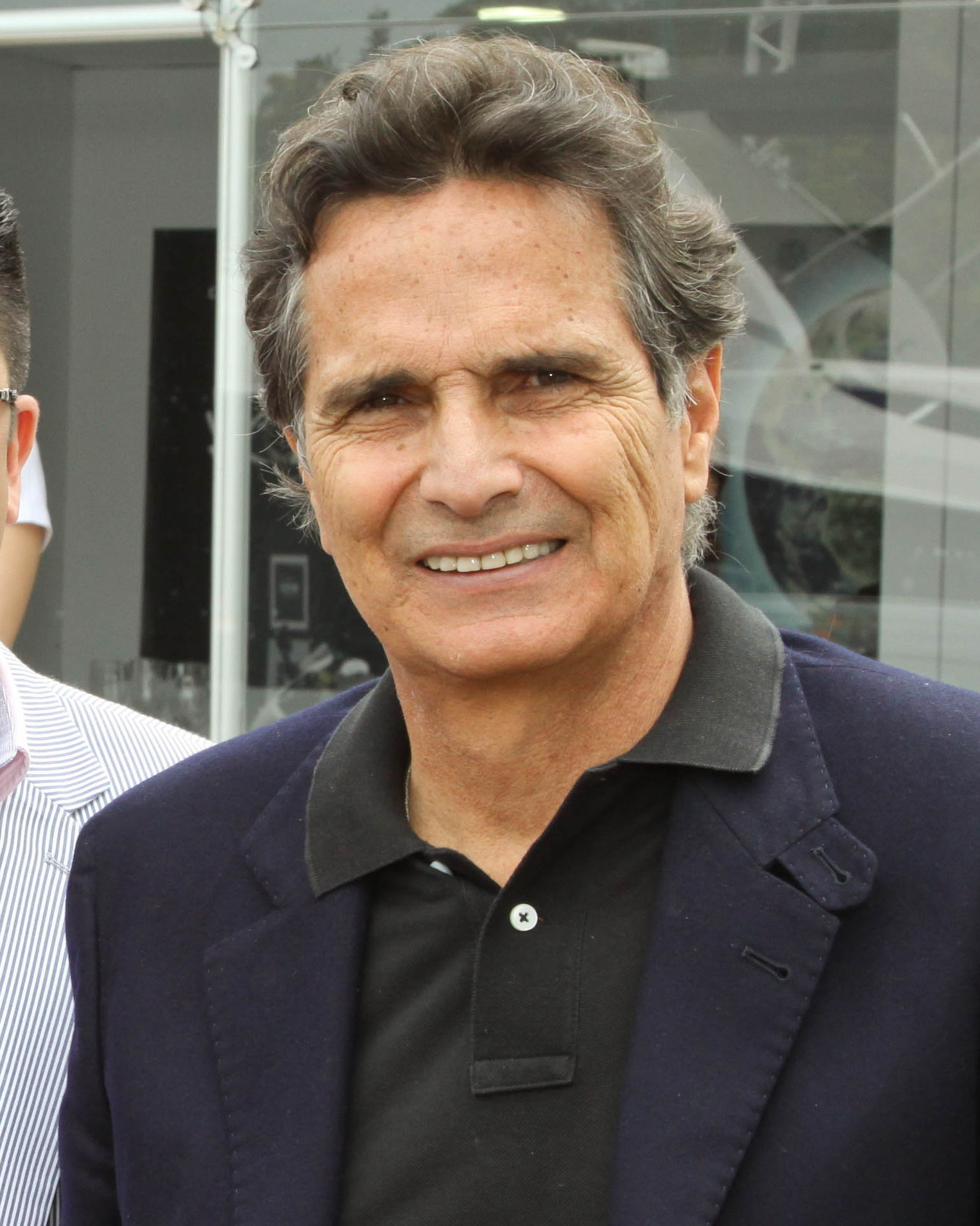
Nelson Piquet, 2013

The first Brazilian Grand Prix at the circuit took place shortly after its opening in 1978, and was won by Argentina's Carlos Reutemann in a Flat-12 Ferrari 312T3 in the oppressive heat and humidity of Rio's January summer season, after Sweden's Ronnie Peterson had taken pole position in the revolutionary ground-effect Lotus 78-Ford.

After the 1979 and 1980 races had been held at the Interlagos circuit in São Paulo, the F1 circus left the 7.873 km (4.892 mi) Interlagos circuit due to safety concerns with the circuit and the growing slums of the circuit's surrounding areas being at odds with Formula One's new glamour image. Rio's beaches and beautiful scenery were more suited to this new image, and the Brazilian Grand Prix was then held at Jacarepaguá for the remainder of the 1980s. The 1981 race was held in very wet conditions and was again won by Reutemann, this time driving a Williams FW07C-Ford, and in controversial circumstances: he disobeyed the team's orders to let teammate and then-reigning World Champion, Australia's Alan Jones, take the win.

The 1982 race, held at the height of the FISA–FOCA war, was also shrouded in controversy. Rio born driver Nelson Piquet, who had won the World Championship the year before, finished first in a Brabham BT49-Ford, with Finland's Keke Rosberg second in a Williams FW07C-Ford. However, both drivers were disqualified for being underweight, having raced with "water-cooled brakes". This promoted Alain Prost, third in the turbocharged Renault RE30, to the win, the first of an eventual five for the Frenchman at the circuit and start a streak of 7 straight wins for turbo powered cars at the circuit until the original turbo era ended following the 1988 season. The disqualifications, however, prompted most FOCA-aligned teams – including Brabham and Williams – to boycott the San Marino Grand Prix two races later. However, unlike the 1980 Spanish Grand Prix where the factory teams of Ferrari, Renault and Alfa Romeo (all who were on the FISA side of the war) boycotted the race and the results were eventually voided, the 1982 San Marino Grand Prix results without the FOCA teams were counted.

Piquet and Rosberg again crossed the line first and second in the 1983 race, although this time only Rosberg was disqualified, having had a push start in the pits after his Williams FW08-Ford caught fire. Unusually, the drivers below Rosberg were not promoted accordingly. The win was the first of two wins at the circuit for Piquet, who would go on to win his second World Championship that year. Piquet won the race in his Brabham-BMW turbo and went on to be the first ever F1 World Champion to be powered by a turbocharged engine. From 1983 until 1989, the Brazilian Grand Prix was the opening race of the season.

Both the 1984 and 1985 races were won by Prost, now racing a McLaren-TAG. The 1984 race also saw the debut of Ayrton Senna, driving a Toleman TG183-Hart where he had the unfortunate 'honour' of being the first retirement of the 1984 season. Piquet won the 1986 race in a Williams FW11-Honda, with Senna making it a Brazilian 1–2 in a Lotus 98T-Renault, before Prost beat Piquet to win the 1987 race in a McLaren MP4/3-TAG.

After Piquet won his third (and final) World Championship in 1987, the circuit was named after him in 1988. However, he had to settle for third in a Lotus 100T-Honda in that year's race, as Prost once again won in a McLaren MP4/4-Honda. 1988 was the last year of the original turbo era in Formula One. For Prost it was his 5th win in 9 races at the circuit.

The 1989 race was the first to be held following the banning of turbo engines, and Great Britain's Nigel Mansell took a surprise win in his V12 powered Ferrari 640, complete with Formula 1's first semi-automatic gearbox. Another Brazilian driver, Maurício Gugelmin, finished third in a March 881 (Prost finished second), while Senna, who had won his first World Championship the year before, set the fastest ever lap of the circuit in qualifying with a time of 1:25.302 to take pole position in a V10 McLaren MP4/5-Honda. After winning the race, Mansell joked that with the Ferrari's known reliability problems at the time he had booked an early flight out of Rio in anticipation of a short race for him.

In 1990, the Brazilian Grand Prix moved to a shortened Interlagos, where it has been held ever since.

=== CART ===
From 1996 to 2000 the CART series staged events at Jacarepaguá in an accessory trapezoid-shaped speedway named "Emerson Fittipaldi Speedway", having approximately 3.000 km (1.864 mi) length. The race, originally the Rio 400, before being shortened to the Rio 200 in 1999, was first won in 1996 by Brazilian André Ribeiro.

The circuit qualifying record for the Emerson Fittipaldi Speedway was set by Emerson's own nephew Christian Fittipaldi with a time of 0:38.565 (280 km/h (170 mph)) for the 3.000 km (1.864 mi) track.

The long back straight of the road course which had grandstands running its entire 900 m (980 yd) length became the front straight of the Speedway, with the pits located in the area between the straight and the pit straight of the road course.

=== Motorcycle racing ===
The circuit also hosted the Rio de Janeiro motorcycle Grand Prix race from 1995 to 2004. Valentino Rossi won the most races, winning four from 2000 to 2003, while Mick Doohan won the 1996 and 1997 races.

The first Rio Motorcycle Grand Prix was won by Italian Luca Cadalora, riding a Yamaha YZR500. The final race held at the circuit in 2004, was won by Japanese rider Makoto Tamada riding a Honda RC211V.

Honda won seven of the nine Rio Grands Prix held, with Yamaha winning two.

== Lap records ==
The fastest official race lap records at the circuit are listed as follows:

| Category | Time | Driver | Vehicle | Event | Circuit Map |
Short Circuit: 3.336 km (2.073 mi) (1996–2012)
| Formula Three | 1:06.756 | Leonardo Cordeiro | Dallara F309 | 2009 Rio F3 Sudamericana round | |
| GT3 | 1:11.257 | Xandinho Negrão | Lamborghini Gallardo LP600 GT3 | 2011 Rio GT Brasil round | |
| Porsche Carrera Cup | 1:15.171 | Constantino Júnior | Porsche 911 (997) GT3 Cup 3.8 | 2011 Rio Porsche Cup Brasil round | |
| Formula Future Fiat | 1:17.049 | Nicolas Costa | Signatech-Fiat Formula Futuro | 2010 Rio Formula Futuro Fiat round | |
| GT4 | 1:17.151 | Alan Hellmeister | Aston Martin V8 Vantage GT4 | 2012 Rio Campeonato Brasileiro de GT round | |
| Ferrari Challenge | 1:17.777 | Alan Hellmeister | Ferrari F430 Challenge | 2011 Rio GT Brasil round | |
| Stock Car Brasil | 1:19.127 | Ricardo Maurício | Chevrolet Vectra | 2010 Rio Stock Car Brasil round | |
Modified Grand Prix Circuit: 4.933 km (3.065 mi) (1996–2005)
| Formula Three | 1:43.275 | Alberto Valerio | Dallara F301 | 2005 Rio F3 Sudamericana round | |
| Formula Renault 2.0 | 1:49.647 | Alan Hellmeister | Tatuus FR2000 | 2004 Rio Formula Renault 2.0 Brazil round | |
| MotoGP | 1:49.789 | Makoto Tamada | Honda RC211V | 2004 Rio de Janeiro motorcycle Grand Prix | |
| 500cc | 1:51.928 | Tadayuki Okada | Honda NSR500 | 1997 Rio de Janeiro motorcycle Grand Prix | |
| 250cc | 1:53.573 | Sebastián Porto | Aprilia RSV 250 | 2004 Rio de Janeiro motorcycle Grand Prix | |
| Stock Car Brasil | 1:56.584 | Thiago Camilo | Chevrolet Astra | 2005 1st Rio Stock Car Brasil round | |
| 125cc | 1:57.789 | Héctor Barberá | Aprilia RS125R | 2004 Rio de Janeiro motorcycle Grand Prix | |
Emerson Fittipaldi Speedway: 3.000 km (1.864 mi) (1996–2005)
| CART | 0:38.891 | Juan Pablo Montoya | Reynard 99I | 1999 Grand Prix Telemar Rio 200 | |
| Formula Three | 0:48.045 | Hoover Orsi | Dallara F394 | 1999 Rio F3 Sudamericana round | |
Original Grand Prix Circuit: 5.032 km (3.127 mi) (1978–1995)
| Formula One | 1:32.507 | Riccardo Patrese | Williams FW12C | 1989 Brazilian Grand Prix | |
| Formula Three | 1:53.070 | Gabriel Furlan | Dallara F390 | 1992 Rio F3 Sudamericana round | |

== Final years ==
As of early 2005, there were plans to partially demolish this racetrack to make room for a new sports complex to be used for the 2007 Pan American Games. It would have made the track approximately 3.336 km (2.073 mi) long, thus making it too short for most international racing series. However, the FIA's ruling on a track's minimum length is ambiguous. In 2006, despite rumors of the race being cancelled, the Brazilian Stock Car Rio event was contested on a temporary short circuit combining sections of the oval and normal circuits and the start/finish line was moved to the back stretch, which was cut short to make room for the Pan-American games venues.

Another proposal for the circuit was to have both a club permanent circuit, and an international-length half-permanent, half-car park circuit involving that circuit and an extension which utilises the car parks of the park. That would have been designed by Hermann Tilke.

In January 2008 it was announced that the track was to be demolished to allow the city to build an Olympic Training Centre venue for the 2016 Summer Olympics which Rio was successful in winning.

As of 2008, the 3.336 km (2.073 mi) track comprised the original circuit's second half with a hairpin that connects the previous main straight and back straight. It remained active, with races such as Stock Car's Corrida do Milhão.

The track and adjacent motorsport facilities were finally demolished in November 2012 to make way for new facilities to be used during the 2016 Summer Olympics.

In March 2013 Bernie Ecclestone, CEO of the Formula One Group, said discussions were taking place for the Formula 1 Grand Prix to move from the Interlagos Circuit in São Paulo to Rio de Janeiro and a suitable time for this could be 2016, coinciding with the 2016 Olympic Games. Formula 1 last raced at Rio in 1989 before returning to São Paulo in 1990, where it has been held since. As of 2026, no Grand Prix has been held in Rio since.

== See also ==
- Barra Olympic Park
- Autódromo de Deodoro
