= Ingo Hoffmann =

Brazilian racing driver (born 1953)

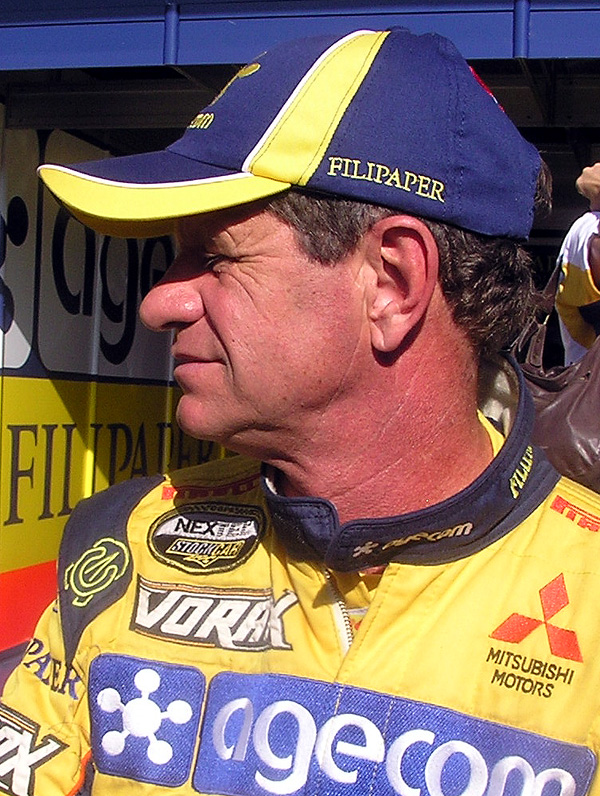
- In 2007, as a Stock Car Brasil driver
- Born: Ingo Ott Hoffmann; 28 February 1953 (age 73); São Paulo, Brazil

Formula One World Championship career
- Nationality: (Brazil) Brazilian
- Active years: 1976–1977
- Team: Fittipaldi
- Entries: 6 (3 starts)
- Championships: 0
- Wins: 0
- Podiums: 0
- Career points: 0
- Pole positions: 0
- Fastest laps: 0
- First entry: 1976 Brazilian Grand Prix
- Last entry: 1977 Brazilian Grand Prix

Ingo Ott Hoffmann (born 28 February 1953) is a Brazilian retired racing driver from São Paulo. He is most well known for winning the Brazilian Stock Car Championship 12 times (1980, 1985, 1989–1994, 1996–1998 and 2002). He also participated in six Formula One Grands Prix, debuting on 25 January 1976. He scored no championship points.

== History ==
=== Early career ===
Hoffman began his career in Brazil competing in Formula Vee and saloon cars. He came to England in 1975 and competed in Formula Three in a March, before moving into Formula One in 1976.

=== Formula One years ===
Hoffmann's Formula One career was hindered by the financial problems of the Fittipaldi team, and he drove the team's second car when realistically the team could only afford to run one. This meant Hoffmann only entered certain selected races, and ultimately the second car was dropped altogether. He entered four Grands Prix in 1976, did not qualify for three of them and an eleventh place at Interlagos was the best result achieved. In 1977, Hoffman competed at Buenos Aires (retired, engine) and again at Interlagos where he finished seventh, two laps behind the winner. However, that was Hoffman's last race in Formula One, as the second Fittipaldi entry was withdrawn.

=== After Formula One ===
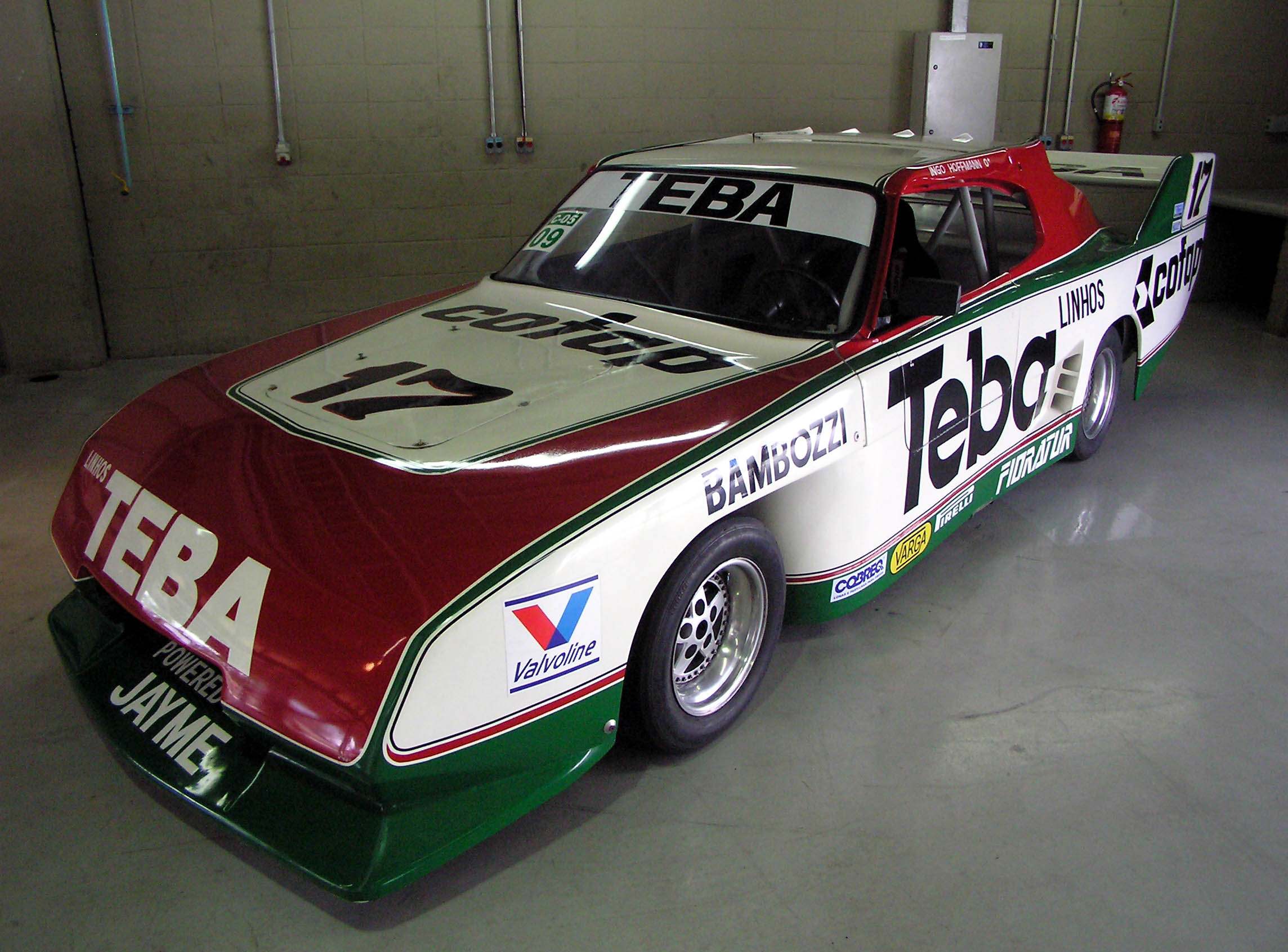
Hoffmann's Chevrolet Opala in the Brazilian Stock Car Championship, 1988

With the end of his Formula One career, Hoffmann competed in Formula 2 for Project Four with a Ralt and a March in 1977 and 1978, (which was his last year in Europe). He also competed in sports cars and saloon cars both in Europe and in South America.

Notably, Hoffmann has won the Brazilian Stock Car Championship 12 times (1980, 1985, 1989-1994, 1996-1998 and 2002). In 2006 December, he took his 100th win (of the races in the Brazilian circuits) at the Autódromo Internacional Nelson Piquet de Brasília, final race of the 2006 season.

== Racing record ==
=== Complete European F5000 Championship results ===
(key) (Races in bold indicate pole position; races in italics indicate fastest lap.)

Year	Entrant	Chassis	Engine	1	2	3	4	5	6	7	8	9	10	11	12	13	14	15	16	Pos.	Pts
1975	A.G. Dean	Chevron B28	Chevrolet 5.0 V8	BRH	OUL	BRH	SIL	ZOL	ZAN	THR	SNE	MAL	THR	BRH	OUL	SIL; 7	SNE	MAL; DNS	BRH; 4	14th	24

=== Complete European Formula Two Championship results ===
(key) (Races in bold indicate pole position; races in italics indicate fastest lap)

Year	Entrant	Chassis	Engine	1	2	3	4	5	6	7	8	9	10	11	12	13	Pos.	Pts
1976	Willi Kauhsen Racing Team	March 762	Hart	HOC; Ret	THR; 5	VAL; Ret	SAL; Ret	PAU; DNS	HOC	ROU; 6	MUG; 8	PER; DNQ	EST	NOG; DNQ	HOC; 8		14th	3
1977	Project Four Racing	Ralt RT1	BMW	SIL; 4	THR; Ret	HOC; Ret	NÜR; 7	VAL; 16	PAU; 8	MUG; 9	ROU; 5	NOG; 3	PER; 3	MIS; 3	EST; Ret	DON; Ret	7th	18
1978	Project Four Racing	March 782	BMW	THR; Ret	HOC; 4	NÜR; 6	PAU; Ret	MUG; 4	VAL; Ret	ROU; Ret	DON; 4	NOG; 5	PER; Ret	MIS; 10	HOC; 14		6th	13

=== Complete Formula One results ===
(key)

Year	Entrant	Chassis	Engine	1	2	3	4	5	6	7	8	9	10	11	12	13	14	15	16	17	WDC	Pts
1976	Copersucar-Fittipaldi	Fittipaldi FD03	Ford Cosworth DFV 3.0 V8	BRA; 11	RSA																NC	0
1976	Copersucar-Fittipaldi	Fittipaldi FD04	Ford Cosworth DFV 3.0 V8			USW; DNQ	ESP; DNQ	BEL	MON	SWE	FRA; DNQ	GBR	GER	AUT	NED	ITA	CAN	USA	JPN		NC	0
1977	Copersucar-Fittipaldi	Fittipaldi FD04	Ford Cosworth DFV 3.0 V8	ARG; Ret	BRA; 7	RSA	USW	ESP	MON	BEL	SWE	FRA	GBR	GER	AUT	NED	ITA	USA	CAN	JPN	NC	0

Sporting positions
Preceded by Paulo Gomes	Stock Car Brasil champion 1979	Succeeded by Affonso Giaffone
Preceded by Paulo Gomes	Stock Car Brasil champion 1985	Succeeded by Marcos Garcia
Preceded by Fábio Sotto Mayor	Stock Car Brasil champion 1989-1994	Succeeded by Paulo Gomes
Preceded by Paulo Gomes	Stock Car Brasil champion 1996-1998	Succeeded by Chico Serra
Preceded by Chico Serra	Stock Car Brasil champion 2002	Succeeded by David Muffato
