= Guilherme Samaia =

Brazilian racing driver

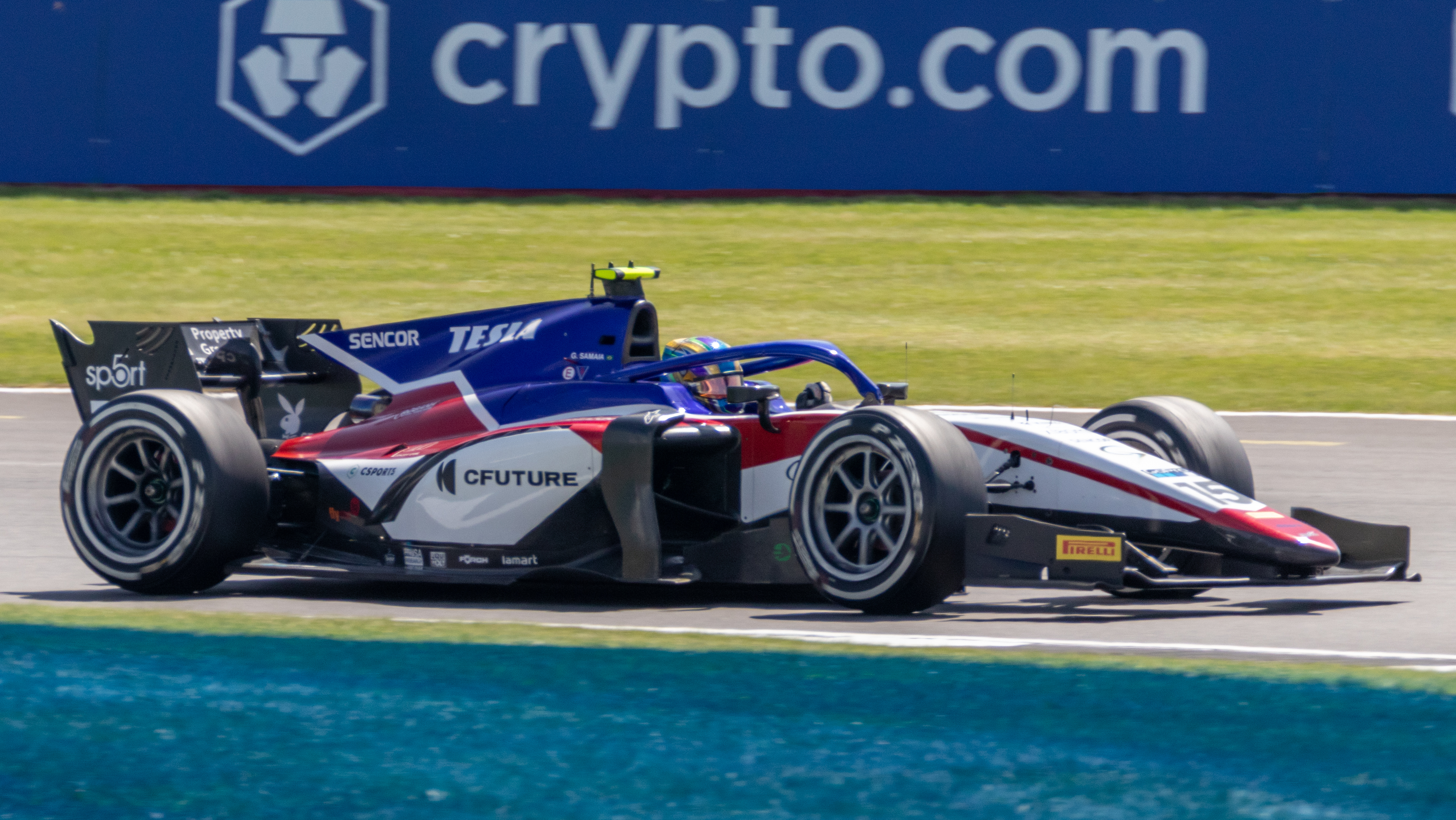
- Samaia at the 2021 Silverstone Formula 2 round
- Nationality: (Brazil) Brazilian
- Born: Guilherme de Abreu Sampaio Samaia; 2 October 1996 (age 30) São Paulo, Brazil

FIA Formula 2 Championship career
- Debut season: 2020
- Former teams: Campos Racing, Charouz Racing System
- Starts: 24 (24 entries)
- Wins: 0
- Podiums: 0
- Poles: 0
- Fastest laps: 0
- Best finish: 24th in 2020, 2021

Previous series
- 2017-2019 2016-2017 2017 2015 2014: Euroformula Open; Formula 3 A Brasil; British F3 Championship; Formula 3 Brazil Light; Fórmula Junior Brazil

Championship titles
- 2017 2015: Formula 3 A Brasil; Formula 3 Brazil Light

Guilherme de Abreu Sampaio Samaia (born 2 October 1996 in São Paulo) is a Brazilian former racing driver. He has competed in the 2021 Formula 2 Championship with Charouz, and in 2020 racing for Campos. In 2017, he won the Brazilian Formula 3 season with Cesário F3.

== Career ==
=== Karting ===
Samaia began his racing career in karting in 2012, competing the Florida Winter Tour - Rotax Junior championship. His only season in the championship resulted in Samaia finishing 47th out of 63 competitors. The championship was won by Oliver Askew and had Kyle Kirkwood and Juan Manuel Correa also competing.

=== Junior Formulas in Brazil ===
In 2013, Samaia competed in two of the sixteen races in the Fórmula Junior Brazil championship for Satti Racing Team, gaining ten points and finishing 16th.

For 2015, Samaia switched to the Formula 3 Brazil Light series racing for Cesário. He scored thirteen podiums in sixteen races, including six wins and took the championship title with 171 points, thirty points ahead of second place Matheus Muniz.

Sticking with Cesário, Samaia jumped up to Formula 3 Brazil for the 2016 season. He finished second in the first round of the season at Velopark, behind Carlos Cunha Filho. Samaia didn't win his first race until the first race at the Autódromo José Carlos Pace Circuit in the fourth round of the season, he would go on to win two more races meaning he finished the season with three wins and ten podiums. Samaia finished second with 140 points, sixty-five points behind eventual champion Matheus Iorio.

In 2017, Samaia dominated the Formula 3 A Brasil championship, winning all but three of the sixteen races finishing fifth, eighth and second respectively in the races that he did not win. This ultimately led to him winning the championship by 87 points.

=== BRDC British Formula 3 ===
In 2017, Samaia competed in the British F3 championship with Double R Racing. Samaia finished the season 13th with two podiums at Spa-Francorchamps and Snetterton. He finished behind future Williams F1 development driver and 2019 W Series champion Jamie Chadwick along with the season champion Enaam Ahmed.

=== Euroformula Open ===
Samaia made his début in the Euroformula Open Championship in 2017 with Carlin at the fifth round in Silverstone where he finished 14th. Samaia would continue to race for the remaining races where he would finish the season in seventeenth with seven points behind fellow Brazilian Christian Hahn.

In 2018, Samaia made the switch to the Italian team RP Motorsport. His highest finish was his only podium when he finished third at the first race of the third round in Belgium. He ended the season sixth with 94 points. Teammate, fellow compatriot and 2020 Formula 2 competitor Felipe Drugovich won the championship with 405 points.

For 2019, Samaia switched to Spanish outfit Teo Martín Motorsport where he would race in the first four rounds. He achieved one podium at Le Castellet in the second race of the season, which helped him to a sixteenth-place finish.

=== FIA Formula 2 Championship ===
==== 2020 ====
On 17 February 2020, Campos announced that Samaia would race for them after a successful post season test in Abu Dhabi in 2019. His teammate was also announced on the same day to be the Brit Jack Aitken. Throughout the year, he did not score any points, with a 14th-place finish at Monza being his best result of the year. Samaia finished 24th in the drivers' standings, the lowest of the drivers who competed full-time.

==== 2021 ====
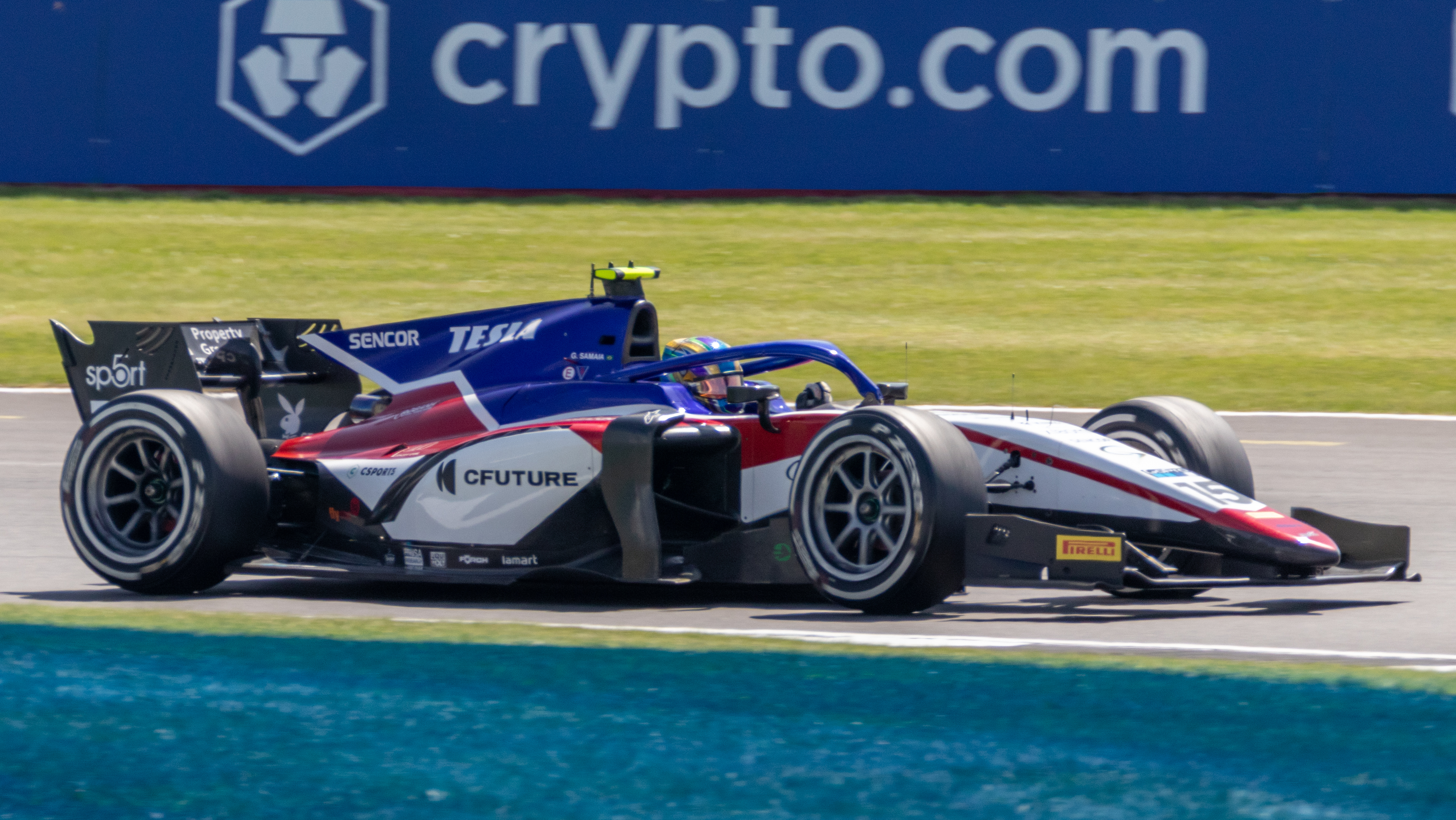
Samaia at the 2021 Silverstone Formula 2 round

Despite his performance, he made an appearance for Charouz Racing System at the post-season test in Bahrain and was soon confirmed to be partnering David Beckmann at the Czech team for the 2021 season. Samaia's results did not improve, failing to score points for a second year in a row; his best results for the year was a pair of 11th-places in Bahrain. He finished 24th in the drivers' standings for a second year in a row. Samaia left the team and the series at the end of the season.

=== Retirement ===
On February 23, 2022, Samaia announced that he was retiring from motorsport. He left open the possibility of returning in the future.

== Karting record ==
=== Karting career summary ===
Season	Series	Position
2012	Florida Winter Tour — Rotax Junior	47th

== Racing record ==
=== Racing career summary ===
Season	Series	Team	Races	Wins	Poles	F/Laps	Podiums	Points	Position
2013	Fórmula Junior Brazil	Satti Racing Team	2	0	0	0	0	10	16th
2015	Formula 3 Brazil Light	Cesário F3	16	6	2	7	13	171	**1st**
2016	Formula 3 Brasil	Cesário F3	16	3	1	9	10	140	**2nd**
2017	Formula 3 Brasil	Cesário F3	16	13	5	12	14	219	**1st**
2017	BRDC British Formula 3	Double R Racing	24	0	0	0	2	195	13th
2017	Euroformula Open Championship	Carlin	8	0	0	0	0	7	17th
2017	Spanish Formula 3 Championship	Carlin	4	0	0	0	0	0	NC†
2018	Euroformula Open Championship	RP Motorsport	16	0	0	0	1	94	6th
2018	Spanish Formula 3 Championship	RP Motorsport	6	0	0	0	0	40	5th
2019	Euroformula Open Championship	Teo Martín Motorsport	8	0	0	1	1	26	16th
2019	Euroformula Open Winter Series	Teo Martín Motorsport	2	0	1	0	0	17	6th
2020	FIA Formula 2 Championship	Campos Racing	24	0	0	0	0	0	24th
2021	FIA Formula 2 Championship	Charouz Racing System	23	0	0	0	0	0	24th

^{†} As Samaia was a guest driver, he was ineligible to score points.
^{*} Season still in progress.

=== Complete Formula 3 Brasil results ===
(key) (Races in bold indicate pole position; races in italics indicate points for the fastest lap of top ten finishers)

Year	Entrant	Class	1	2	3	4	5	6	7	8	9	10	11	12	13	14	15	16	17	DC	Points
2015	Césario F3	B	CUR1; 1; 4	CUR1; 2 Ret	VEL; 1; 6	VEL; 2; 4	SCS; 1; 8	SCS; 2; 6	CUR2; 1; 8	CUR2; 2; 6	CAS; 1 Ret	CAS; 2; 6	CGR; 1; 7	CGR; 2; 7	**CUR3**; **1**; 12	CUR3; 2; 8	**INT**; **1**; 3	INT; 2 Ret		1st	171
2016	Césario F3	A	VEL; 1; 2	VEL; 2 Ret	SCS; 1 Ret	SCS; 2 C	CAS; 1; 5	CAS; 2; 3	CAS; 3; 2	**INT**; **1**; 1	INT; 2; 4	LON; 1; 5	LON; 2; 1	**CUR**; **1**; 2	CUR; 2; 1	GOI; 1; 2	GOI; 2; 3	INT; 1; 2	INT; 2 Ret	2nd	140
2017	Césario F3	A	CUR; 1; 1	CUR; 2; 5	**INT1**; **1**; 1	INT1; 2; 1	**VEC**; **1**; 1	VEC; 2; 1	INT2; 1; 1	INT2; 2; 1	**SCS**; **1**; 8	SCS; 2; 1	**LON**; **1**; 1	LON; 2; 2	**GOI**; **1**; 1	GOI; 2; 1	**INT3**; **1**; 1	INT3; 2; 1		1st	219

=== Complete BRDC British Formula 3 Championship results ===
(key) (Races in bold indicate pole position; races in italics indicate points for the fastest lap of top ten finishers)

Year	Entrant	1	2	3	4	5	6	7	8	9	10	11	12	13	14	15	16	17	18	19	20	21	22	23	24	DC	Points
2017	Double R Racing	OUL; 1; 13	OUL; 2 Ret	OUL; 3 Ret	ROC; 1; 9	ROC; 2; 12	ROC; 3; 9	SNE; 1; 14	SNE; 2; 10	SNE; 3 Ret	SIL; 1; 14	SIL; 2; 13	SIL; 3; 8	SPA; 1; 3	SPA; 2 Ret	SPA; 3; 12	BRH; 1 Ret	BRH; 2 Ret	BRH; 3; 12	SNE; 1; 8	SNE; 2; 2	SNE; 3; 10	DON; 1; 14	DON; 2; 8	DON; 3 Ret	13th	195

=== Complete Euroformula Open Championship results ===
(key) (Races in bold indicate pole position; races in italics indicate points for the fastest lap of top ten finishers)

Year	Entrant	1	2	3	4	5	6	7	8	9	10	11	12	13	14	15	16	17	18	DC	Points
2017	Carlin	EST; 1	EST; 2	SPA; 1	SPA; 2	LEC; 1	LEC; 2	HUN; 1	HUN; 2	SIL; 1; 14	SIL; 2 Ret	MNZ; 1 Ret	MNZ; 2; 10	JER; 1; 12	JER; 2; 13	CAT; 1; 9	CAT; 2; 16			17th	7
2018	RP Motorsport	EST; 1; 7	EST; 2; 8	LEC; 1; 4	LEC; 2; 4	SPA; 1; 3	SPA; 2; 8	HUN; 1 Ret	HUN; 2; 10	SIL; 1; 10	SIL; 2; 10	MNZ; 1; 11	MNZ; 2; 7	JER; 1; 7	JER; 2; 7	CAT; 1; 7	CAT; 2; 6			6th	94
2019	Teo Martín Motorsport	LEC; 1; 8	LEC; 2; 2	PAU; 1; 10	PAU; 2; 9	HOC; 1; 14	HOC; 2; 11	SPA; 1; 11	SPA; 2; 17	HUN; 1	HUN; 2	RBR; 1	RBR; 2	SIL; 1	SIL; 2	CAT; 1	CAT; 2	MNZ; 1	MNZ; 2	16th	26

=== Complete FIA Formula 2 Championship results ===
(key) (Races in bold indicate pole position) (Races in italics indicate points for the fastest lap of top ten finishers)

Year	Entrant	1	2	3	4	5	6	7	8	9	10	11	12	13	14	15	16	17	18	19	20	21	22	23	24	DC	Points
2020	Campos Racing	RBR; FEA; 16	RBR; SPR; 15	RBR; FEA; 20	RBR; SPR; 17	HUN; FEA; 15	HUN; SPR; 21	SIL; FEA; 21	SIL; SPR; 15	SIL; FEA; 20	SIL; SPR; 19	CAT; FEA; 16	CAT; SPR; 20	SPA; FEA; Ret	SPA; SPR; 15	MNZ; FEA; 21	MNZ; SPR; 14	MUG; FEA; 18	MUG; SPR; 16	SOC; FEA; 16	SOC; SPR; Ret	BHR; FEA; 21	BHR; SPR; 18†	BHR; FEA; 22	BHR; SPR; 19	24th	0
2021	Charouz Racing System	BHR; SP1; 11	BHR; SP2; 11	BHR; FEA; 16	MCO; SP1; 17	MCO; SP2; 13	MCO; FEA; 15	BAK; SP1; 17	BAK; SP2; 14	BAK; FEA; 18	SIL; SP1; Ret	SIL; SP2; 17	SIL; FEA; 20	MNZ; SP1; Ret	MNZ; SP2; Ret	MNZ; FEA; Ret	SOC; SP1; 13	SOC; SP2; C	SOC; FEA; 13	JED; SP1; Ret	JED; SP2; Ret	JED; FEA; 17	YMC; SP1; 16	YMC; SP2; 12	YMC; FEA; 16	24th	0

^{†} Driver did not finish the race, but was classified, as they completed more than 90% of the race distance.

Sporting positions
Preceded by Matheus Iorio	Formula 3 A Brasil; Champion; 2017	Succeeded by N/A
Preceded by Vitor Baptista	Formula 3 Brazil Light; Champion; 2015	Succeeded by Pedro Caland
