= Leonardo de Souza =

Brazilian racing driver (born 1986)

Leonardo Augusto Antunes de Souza (born January 9, 1986) is a Brazilian racing driver.

== Career ==
=== Karting ===
De Souza was born in Curitiba. He began racing karts in 1999 at the age of 13, where he won three South Brazilian championships in 2001, 2003 and 2004, besides the State championships of Parana and Santa Catarina in 2001 and 2003 respectively.

=== Formula Renault and Formula Three ===
In 2005 and 2006, de Souza competed in the Brazilian Formula Renault with his own team, Kemba Racing. In 2007, with the extinction of the series he and the team didn't compete anywhere during the season, only returning to the track in 2008 in the South American Formula 3, where he scored regularly in the last three stages of the championship in Santa Cruz do Sul (RS), Curitiba (PR) and Interlagos (SP) and ending the year in ninth place. In 2009, he and the team saw their first win at their home track in Curitiba, unfortunately the lack of better performances due to mechanical failures hurt their fight in the championship and he could only finish the season again in the ninth place.

For 2010 and 2011 seasons, de Souza continued to race with his own team in South America Formula 3 and was able to get another two wins (at Londrina in 2010 and Rio de Janeiro in 2011) and more podiums finishes, but unfortunately poor reliability meant that again he would finish the championship way behind the main contenders.

During the 2012 season, de Souza was in contention for the title until the first race of the last round when he suffered a mechanical problem and did not finish the race, confirming the title for that year champion Fernando "Kid" Rezende, he dropped to third place overall in the last race, his best championship result in the series standings.

De Souza missed the beginning of the 2013 season but took two wins and two second places in the last four races of the year, he has the distinction of winning the last race of the South America Formula 3 as the series transformed into the new Formula 3 Brasil for the 2014 season, the 2013 and last champion of the series is Felipe Guimaraes.

De Souza wasn't successful during 2014 and 2015 when the series turned into Formula 3 Brasil, claiming only one win in his category and one podium finish in those two seasons.

== Racing record ==
=== Career summary ===
Season	Series	Team name	Races	Poles	Wins	Podiums	F/Laps	Points	Position
2005	Formula Renault Brasil	Kemba Racing	14	0	0	0	0	18	21st
2006	Formula Renault Brasil	Eng Makers	10	0	0	0	0	8	18th
2008	Formula 3 Sudamericana	Kemba Racing	14	0	0	0	0	24	8th
2009	Formula 3 Sudamericana	Kemba Racing	14	0	1	2	0	33	9th
2010	Formula 3 Sudamericana	Kemba Racing	20	0	1	4	1	171	5th
2011	Formula 3 Sudamericana	Kemba Racing	20	0	1	7	0	164	5th
2012	Formula 3 Sudamericana	Kemba Racing	12	0	1	4	0	84	**3rd**
2013	Formula 3 Sudamericana	Kemba Racing	8	1	2	5	2	115	4th
2014	Formula 3 Brasil	Kemba Racing	10	0	1	1	0	49	6th
2015	Formula 3 Brasil	Kemba Racing	12	0	0	0	0	15	9th
2016	Formula 3 Brasil	Kemba Racing	8	0	0	1	0	27	9th
2017	Formula 3 Brasil	Kemba Racing	10	0	0	0	0	86	**3rd**

- *Season still in progress.

=== Complete Formula 3 Brasil results ===
(key) (Races in bold indicate pole position) (Races in italics indicate fastest lap)

Year	Entrant	1	2	3	4	5	6	7	8	9	10	11	12	13	14	15	16	17	Pos	Points
2014	Kemba Racing	TAR; 1; 6	TAR; 2; 5	SCS; 1; 11	SCS; 2; 8	BRA; 1	BRA; 2	INT; 1; 8	INT; 2; 10	CUR1; 1 Ret	CUR1; 2 Ret	VEL; 1; 5	VEL; 2; 3	CUR2; 1	CUR2; 2	GOI; 1	GOI; 2		6th	49
2015	Kemba Racing	CUR1; 1; 6	CUR1; 2 Ret	VEL; 1; 7	VEL; 2; 13	SCS; 1 Ret	SCS; 2; 10	CUR2; 1 Ret	CUR2; 2 Ret	CAS; 1; 7	CAS; 2 Ret	CGR; 1	CGR; 2	CUR3; 1 Ret	CUR3; 2 Ret	INT; 1	INT; 2		9th	15
2016	Kemba Racing	VEL; 1 Ret	VEL; 2; 4	SCS; 1; 6	SCS; 2 C	CAS; 1; 2	CAS; 2; 12	CAS; 3 Ret	INT; 1	INT; 2	LON; 1	LON; 2	CUR; 1; 6	CUR; 2 Ret	GOI; 1	GOI; 2	INT; 1	INT; 2	9th	27
2017	Kemba Racing	CUR; 1; 4	CUR; 2; 4	INT1; 1	INT1; 2	VEC; 1	VEC; 2	INT2; 1	INT2; 2	SCS; 1; 4	SCS; 2 Ret	LON; 1; 2	LON; 2; 4	GOI; 1; 4	GOI; 2; 4	INT3; 1; 3	INT3; 2; 2		3rd	86
