= Igor Fraga =

Brazilian-Japanese racing driver

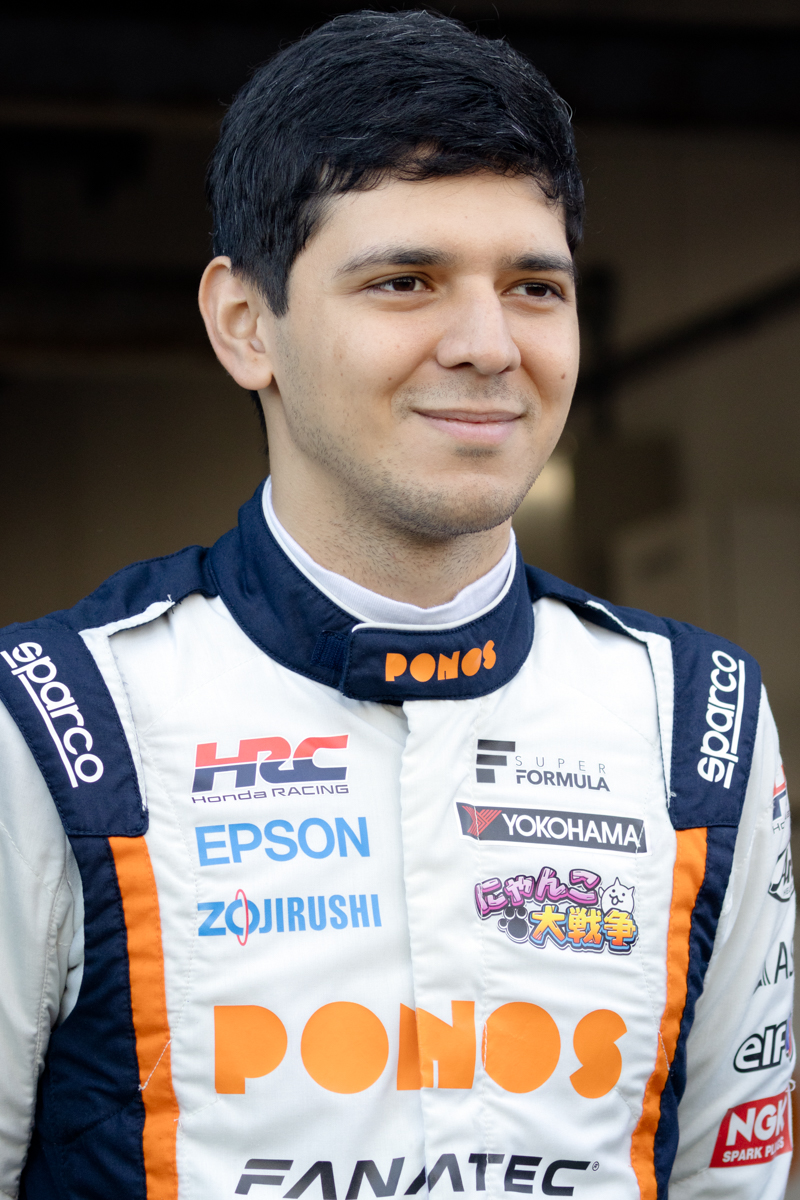
- Fraga in 2025
- Nationality: (Brazil) Brazilian (Japan) Japanese
- Born: Igor Omura Fraga; September 26, 1998 (age 28) Kanazawa, Ishikawa Prefecture, Japan

Super GT - GT500 career
- Debut season: 2026
- Current team: Nakajima Racing
- Car number: 64
- Former teams: Arnage Racing, Anest Iwata Racing
- Starts: 16
- Wins: 0
- Podiums: 1
- Poles: 3
- Fastest laps: 2
- Best finish: 14th in 2026

Super Formula career
- Debut season: 2025
- Current team: Nakajima Racing
- Car number: 65
- Starts: 22
- Wins: 3
- Podiums: 7
- Poles: 2
- Fastest laps: 3
- Best finish: 6th in 2025

Previous series
- 2023–25 2023 2020 2020 2019 2018 2017–18 2015–17: Super GT - GT300; Super Formula Lights; FIA Formula 3 Championship; Toyota Racing Series; Formula Regional European Championship; U.S. F2000 National Championship; NACAM Formula 4 Championship; Formula 3 Brasil

Championship titles
- 2020 2017: Toyota Racing Series; Formula 3 Brasil Academy Class

Igor Omura Fraga (born September 26, 1998) is a Japanese-born Brazilian racing driver who competes in the Super Formula Championship and in Super GT, both for Nakajima Racing.

Beginning in competitive kart racing at a young age in Japan, Fraga graduated to junior formulae eleven years later in 2015, starting out in Formula 3 Brasil. Fraga moved to Europe in 2019 to compete in the Formula Regional European Championship, placing 3rd overall, then progressed to FIA Formula 3 with Charouz Racing System in 2020. Fraga also became the Toyota Racing Series champion in 2020, winning the title by six points ahead of Liam Lawson. He became a member of the Red Bull Junior Team in the process, lasting a year. He returned to Japan in 2022, earning a Super Formula Lights test and later a full-time seat the next season.

Fraga has also been successful in sim racing, winning the McLaren Shadow Project in 2018 and securing a number of titles in Gran Turismo-based tournaments. Fraga's success in the latter, including four titles across three disciplines in the Gran Turismo World Series, allowed him to gain backing from Polyphony Digital, who supported his drive in the 2019 Formula Regional European Championship, and have followed his career since.

== Racing career ==
=== Junior career ===
Fraga began his career through kart racing in 2004 at the Biwako SL Series. He won the Kids Karting class championship during consecutive years in 2004 and 2005, and continued to win the Mini ROK class championships in 2006 and 2007. Fraga would later win the 2008 Asian Karting Open Championship in the Mini ROK class the following year. His family had later considered international kart racing following Fraga's title victory, however the 2008 financial crisis would cause his sponsors to pull out, leaving Fraga with no financial support to continue in Japan, later returning to Brazil in 2010.

==== 2015–18: Junior formula in the Americas ====
Fraga raced in Formula 3 Brasil for three years, all with Prop Car Racing. Fraga's first season in 2015 did not start well, retiring in its first three races under Class B. At the following race, he finished eighth overall, and third in class. Fraga would earn a total of two pole positions, four fastest laps, nine podiums, and four class wins in the season and would finish third in Class B with 117 points. In 2016, Fraga was promoted to Class A, but only raced in four races, those being the first event at the Velopark and the last event at Interlagos. He would finish eleventh in the Class A standings, with one podium and 19 points. Fraga would return to the newly renamed Academy class in 2017. Fraga won the class, finishing the season with 190 points, with seven pole positions, seven fastest laps, 13 podiums, and ten class wins. Simultaneously with Formula 3 Brasil, Fraga also raced in NACAM Formula 4 Championship in 2017. In his only season in 2017–18, Fraga finished second overall and earned 286 points, with five pole positions, seven fastest laps, 12 podiums, and six race wins. In 2018, Fraga participated in the U.S. F2000 National Championship. He ended the season in fourth overall, with three podiums and 213 points.

==== 2019–20: European and Oceanian formula ====
In 2019, Fraga made his European debut in the inaugural Formula Regional European Championship with RP Motorsport, winning four races and finishing third and therefore best of the non-Prema drivers, behind Frederik Vesti and Enzo Fittipaldi. The following year in 2020 saw him participate in the FIA Formula 3 Championship, racing with Charouz Racing System alongside Roman Staněk and David Schumacher. Having only scored one point throughout the season, Fraga was set to switch to Hitech Grand Prix at the final round in Mugello, replacing Max Fewtrell, but Charouz would not authorize the move, which would place Fraga on the sidelines for the finale. He would finish the season in 24th. In March of that year, Fraga was named as a new signing to the Red Bull Junior Team, after winning the Toyota Racing Series title in 2020, beating out fellow Red Bull Junior Liam Lawson. Fraga had signed a contract to compete with Hitech for 2021, however, due to the COVID-19 pandemic, Fraga's funding from his sponsors was greatly reduced, which caused the team to cancel the contract. Left without a drive, Fraga was released from the Red Bull junior programme following the 2020 season.

==== 2022–23: Super Formula Lights ====
At the end of 2022, Fraga partook in a Super Formula Lights test with B-Max Racing. For 2023, he was confirmed to compete in the 2023 Super Formula Lights championship with B-Max Racing, later earning his first win in the series at Sportsland Sugo. Fraga completed the season in fourth overall, taking home seven podiums in total, including the race win at Sugo.

=== Super GT ===
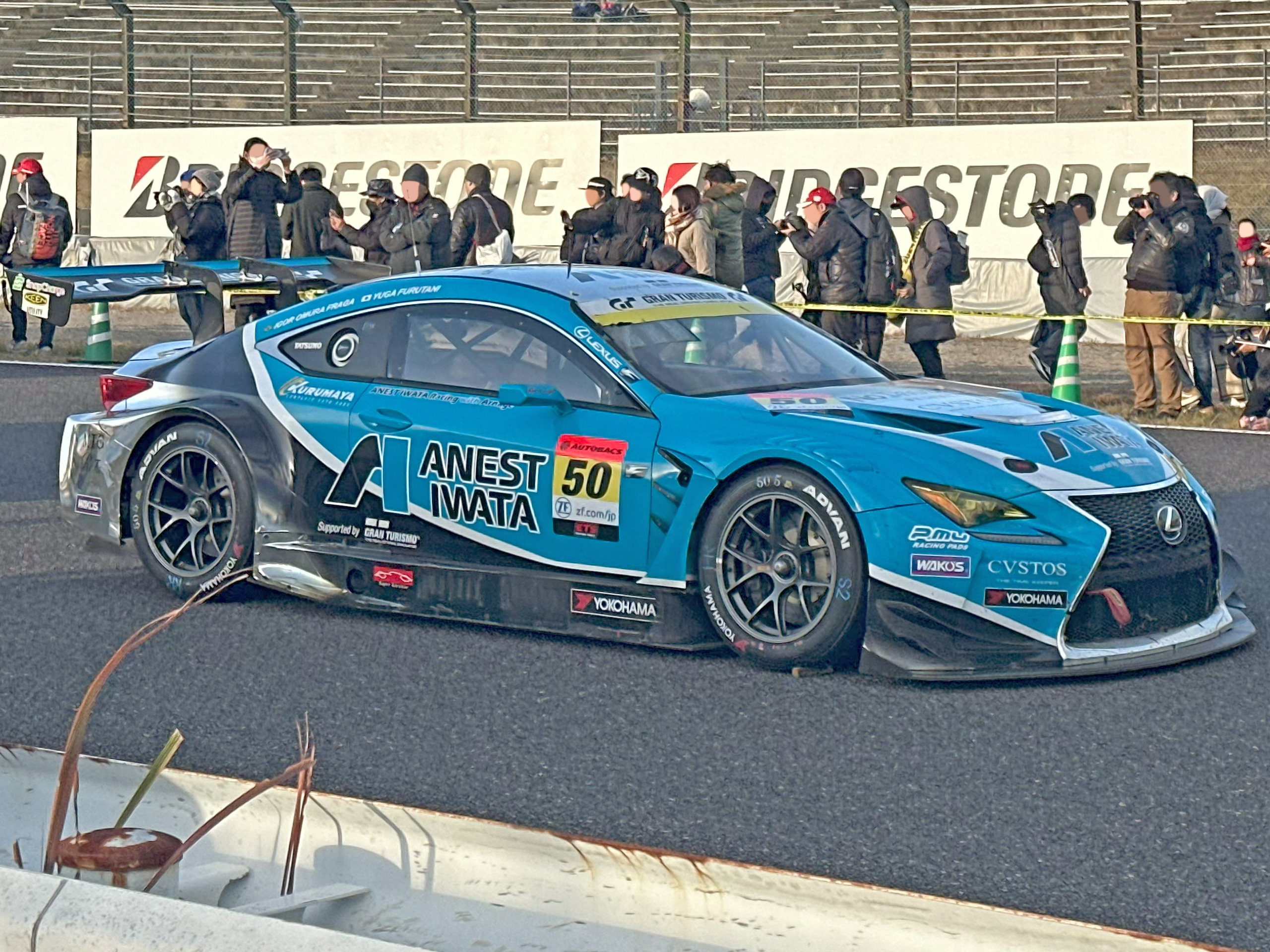
Fraga's No. 50 Anest Iwata Racing Lexus RC F GT3 at Okayama in 2025.

Fraga participated in the 2023 Super GT Series that same year in the GT300 class, competing with Anest Iwata Racing with Arnage in the Lexus RC F GT3 alongside Yuga Furutani and Miki Koyama, the latter joining the lineup in five of the eight rounds. Fraga and Furutani would score twice across the season, with two consecutive points finishes at Suzuka Circuit and Sugo, finishing 10th and 7th respectively. Koyama, who entered with the team for the Suzuka round, did not run a stint during the race and thus remained scoreless. Fraga returned for a second season with the team for 2024, but would be scoreless throughout the season with a best finish of 14th. Fraga would continue to compete with Anest Iwata for 2025 alongside former GT300 champion Hironobu Yasuda. He achieved his first career podium in Super GT at Okayama International Circuit, finishing second after he and Yasuda started in 21st. Fraga and Yasuda did not repeat the same success they had after Okayama, and completed the season 18th overall.

Fraga's No. 64 Nakajima Racing Honda HRC Prelude-GT at Suzuka Circuit in 2026.

Ahead of 2026, Fraga was promoted to the GT500 class, joining Nakajima Racing, the team he drove for in the 2025 Super Formula Championship. On March 25, 2026, Fraga took part in a promotional test at Fuji Speedway organized by Red Bull, testing a Honda NSX GT3 Evo22 prepped by Nakajima Racing. He and teammate Riki Okusa scored three consecutive pole positions, including a maiden podium at Motegi Circuit finishing in 2nd; it would be their only points finish of the season, as Nakajima Racing would conclude the season 14th out of 16 teams in the GT500 standings.

=== Super Formula ===
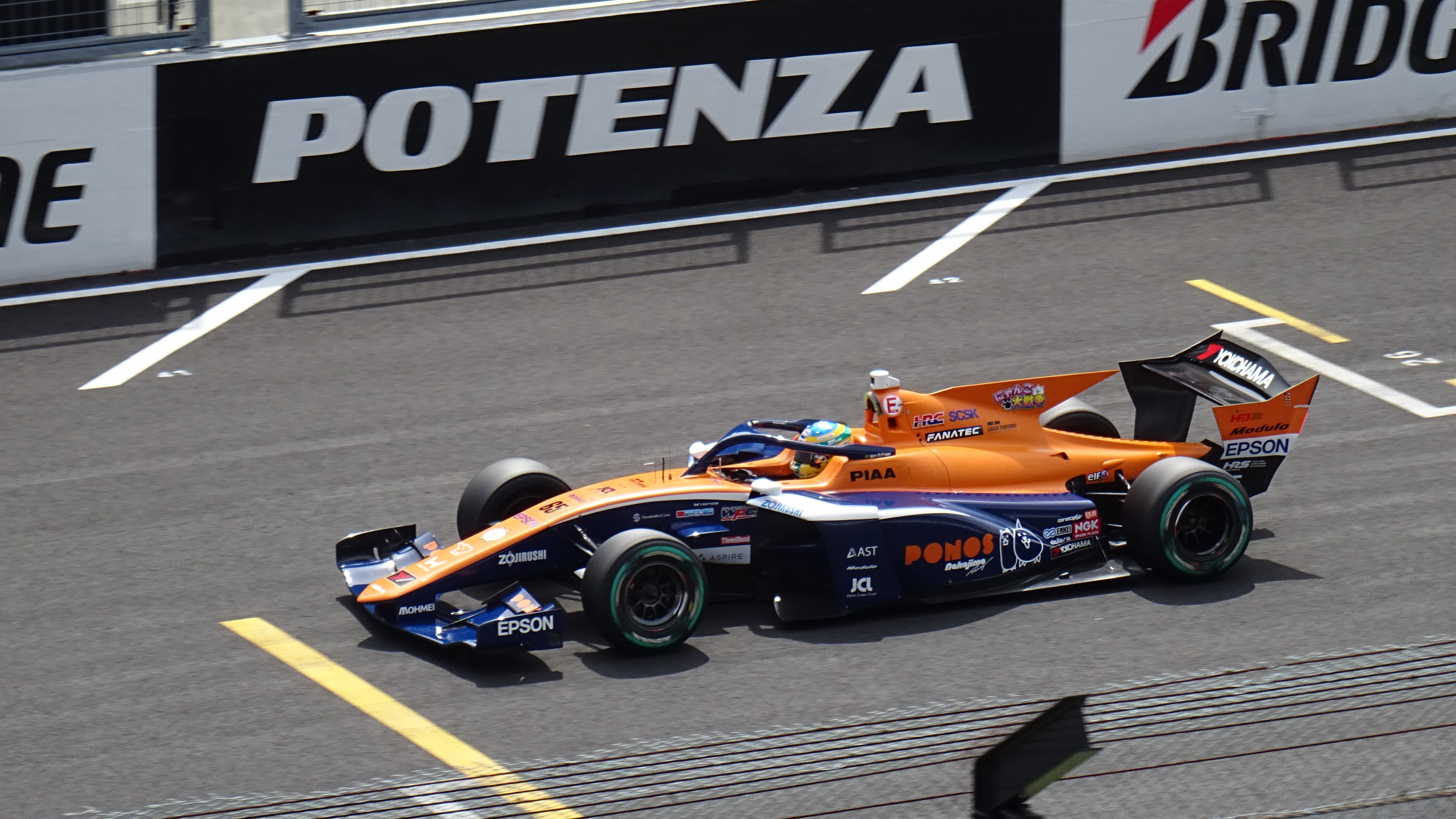
Fraga driving for PONOS Nakajima Racing at Suzuka Circuit in 2026.

Fraga took part in the Super Formula Championship's post-season rookie test with Team Impul in 2022, driving Yuhi Sekiguchi's #19 car. That year, he was also appointed as the esports ambassador for the series. In February 2024, Fraga was announced as a reserve driver for Nakajima Racing in Super Formula, securing a full-time seat a year later in 2025, when he was confirmed to compete with the team for the 2025 Super Formula Championship, replacing a retiring Naoki Yamamoto to partner alongside Ren Sato.

On his debut at the season opener, Fraga fell a lap down in 18th after getting caught in an incident between Nirei Fukuzumi and Hibiki Taira. In Race 2, Fraga had a much cleaner outing, finishing the race behind the safety car in fifth ahead of teammate Sato after starting in 14th. On November 23, 2025, he took his maiden Super Formula win in the Suzuka Season Finale triple-header. Fraga's win marked the first time in three years that a driver not associated with Dandelion Racing, Team Mugen, or TOM'S had won a Super Formula race. His performance throughout the campaign earned him 'Rookie of the Year' honours at the conclusion of the season. In his second season, Fraga secured two wins and four podiums.

== Esports career ==
Fraga in esports

Career highlights and awards
- 1× GTWS Nations Cup champion (2018); 2× GTWS Manufacturers Cup champion (2019, 2021); 1× Toyota GR GT Cup champion (2022); 1× Honda Racing eMS Challenge Class champion (2023); McLaren Shadow Project winner (2018)

Fraga also actively partakes in sim racing alongside his real-world racing endeavors. He has been backed by Japanese video game developer Polyphony Digital since his return to motorsport, a partnership formed through his participation the Gran Turismo World Series, where he has previously been a champion a total of four times in three different series. Fraga is also the esports ambassador for the Super Formula Championship.

Fraga's first appearance in the series came in the inaugural 2018 season, participating in the Nations Cup, where after winning the Americas Regional Final event in Las Vegas, he would become the inaugural Nations Cup champion in the World Final event at Monaco. Fraga would be eliminated early the next season, though would win that year's Manufacturer Series title with teammates Rayan Derrouiche and Tomoaki Yamanaka. He would become Manufacturer Series champion again in 2021, and secure the Toyota Gazoo Racing GT Cup championship the next year.

Fraga also competed in the 2017 Formula One Esports Series, qualifying for the final having finished fourth and second in his Heat group. His results in the final however were not as fruitful, finishing the three races 14th, 18th and scored six points in the last race where he finished 15th. He ended the final 18th out of 20 drivers. He also competed in the inaugural McLaren Shadow Project in 2018 and won the tournament.

In 2021, Fraga would compete in the inaugural Olympic Virtual Series, participating in the 'Motor Sport' event in the Gran Turismo Sport game. He scored a second-place finish in the first race, but would not be able to complete the following two races due to a network problem, which he later clarified on his Twitter. In 2023, Fraga was champion in the Honda Racing eMS competition in the Challenge Class.

== Personal life ==
Fraga was born in Kanazawa, Ishikawa Prefecture, Japan to Brazilian mechanic Fabrizio Fraga and Japanese Brazilian Diana Omura. He previously resided in Ipatinga, Brazil, but later moved back to Japan in 2022. Fraga is a multilinguist, capable of speaking Portuguese, English, Japanese, and Spanish. On January 4, 2025, he married his long-time girlfriend, Lorena.

== Karting record ==
=== Karting career summary ===
Season	Series	Team	Position
2004	Biwako SL Series — Kids Karting	Peter Pan	1st
2005	Nishi Nihon Challenge — Kids Karting	Peter Pan	1st
2005	Biwako SL Series — Kids Karting	Peter Pan	1st
2006	Biwako SL Series — Mini ROK	CRG Japan	1st
2007	Biwako SL Series — Mini ROK	CRG Japan	1st
2007	Asian Karting Open Championship — Mini ROK	CRG Japan	NC
2008	Asian Karting Open Championship — Mini ROK	CRG Japan	1st
2008	Biwako SL Series — Mini ROK	CRG Japan	NC

== Racing record ==
=== Racing career summary ===
Season	Series	Team	Races	Wins	Poles	F/Laps	Podiums	Points	Position
2015	Fórmula 3 Brasil - Class B	Prop Car Racing	16	4	2	4	9	117	**3rd**
2016	Fórmula 3 Brasil	Prop Car Racing	4	0	0	0	1	19	11th
2017	Fórmula 3 Brasil - Academy Class	Prop Car Racing	16	10	7	7	13	190	**1st**
2017–18	NACAM Formula 4 Championship	Prop Car Racing	18	6	5	7	12	280	**2nd**
2018	U.S. F2000 National Championship	Exclusive Autosport	14	0	0	0	3	213	4th
2019	Formula Regional European Championship	DR Formula RP Motorsport	24	4	4	3	11	300	**3rd**
2020	FIA Formula 3 Championship	Charouz Racing System	16	0	0	0	0	1	24th
2020	Toyota Racing Series	M2 Competition	15	4	3	3	9	362	**1st**
2023	Super Formula Lights	B-Max Racing Team	18	1	1	1	7	62	4th
2023	Super GT - GT300	Anest Iwata Racing with Arnage	8	0	0	0	0	5	23rd
2024	Super GT - GT300	Anest Iwata Racing by Arnage	8	0	0	0	0	0	NC
2024	Super Formula	PONOS Nakajima Racing	Reserve driver						
2025	Super Formula	PONOS Nakajima Racing	12	1	0	2	3	77.5	6th
2025	Super GT - GT300	Anest Iwata Racing	8	0	0	0	1	31	18th
2025	Super Taikyu - ST-Z	Team ZeroOne							
2026	Super Formula	PONOS Nakajima Racing							
2026	Super GT - GT500	Modulo Nakajima Racing	8	0	3	2	1	18	14th
2026	Super Taikyu - ST-Z	Techno First							

^{*} Season still in progress.

=== Complete Formula 3 Brasil results ===
(key) (Races in bold indicate pole position; races in italics indicate points for the fastest lap of top ten finishers)

Year	Entrant	Class	1	2	3	4	5	6	7	8	9	10	11	12	13	14	15	16	17	DC	Points
2015	Prop Car Racing	B	CUR1; 1 Ret	CUR1; 2 Ret	VEL; 1 Ret	VEL; 2; 8	SCS; 1 Ret	SCS; 2; 8	CUR2; 1; 6	CUR2; 2; 11	**CAS**; **1**; 6	CAS; 2 Ret	**CGR**; **1**; 6	CGR; 2 Ret	CUR3; 1; 11	CUR3; 2; 11	INT; 1; 8	INT; 2; 5		3rd	117
2016	Prop Car Racing	A	VEL; 1; 5	VEL; 2 Ret	SCS; 1	SCS; 2	CAS; 1	CAS; 2	CAS; 3	INT; 1	INT; 2	LON; 1	LON; 2	CUR; 1	CUR; 2	GOI; 1	GOI; 2	INT; 1; 5	INT; 2; 3	11th	19
2017	Prop Car Racing	Academy	**CUR**; **1** Ret	CUR; 2; 7	**INT1**; **1**; 5	INT1; 2 Ret	VEC; 1; 6	VEC; 2; 4	**INT2**; **1**; 4	INT2; 2; 3	**SCS**; **1**; 3	SCS; 2; 4	**LON**; **1**; 7	LON; 2; 3	**GOI**; **1**; 3	GOI; 2; 3	**INT3**; **1**; 2	INT3; 2; 6		1st	219

=== Complete NACAM Formula 4 Championship results ===
(key) (Races in bold indicate pole position; races in italics indicate points for the fastest lap of top ten finishers)

Year	Entrant	1	2	3	4	5	6	7	8	9	10	11	12	13	14	15	16	17	18	19	20	21	22	DC	Points
2017–18	Prop Car Racing	AHR1; 1; 1	AHR1; 2; 3	**AHR2**; **1**; 1	AHR2; 2; 6	EDM	EDM	EDM	PUE; 1; 2	PUE; 2; 8	PUE; 3; 1	**AGS**; **1**; 1	AGS; 2; 1	**AGS**; **3** Ret	**MER**; **1**; 1	MER; 2; 2	**MER**; **3**; 1	MTY; 1 DNS	MTY; 2; 4	MTY; 3; 3	AHR3; 1 Ret	AHR3; 2 Ret	AHR3; 3; 3	2nd	280

=== Complete U.S. F2000 National Championship results ===
Year	Team	1	2	3	4	5	6	7	8	9	10	11	12	13	14	Rank	Points
2018	Exclusive Autosport	STP; 8	STP; 2	IMS; 8	IMS; 17	LOR; 7	ROA; 8	ROA; 5	TOR; 7	TOR; 2	MOH; 17	MOH; 3	MOH; 5	POR; 15	POR; 4	4th	213

=== Complete Formula Regional European Championship results ===
(key) (Races in bold indicate pole position; races in italics indicate fastest lap)

Year	Entrant	1	2	3	4	5	6	7	8	9	10	11	12	13	14	15	16	17	18	19	20	21	22	23	24	25	DC	Points
2019	DR Formula RP Motorsport	LEC; 1; 3	LEC; 2; 3	LEC; 3; 7	VLL; 1; 7	VLL; 2; 8	VLL; 3 C	HUN; 1; 5	HUN; 2 DNS	HUN; 3; 4	RBR; 1; 2	RBR; 2; 9	RBR; 3; 1	**IMO**; **1**; 1	IMO; 2; 3	IMO; 3; 2	IMO; 4; 3	CAT; 1; 10	CAT; 2; 4	CAT; 3; 7	MUG; 1; 5	MUG; 2; 5	MUG; 3; 5	**MNZ**; **1**; 1	**MNZ**; **2**; 1	**MNZ**; **3**; 3	3rd	300

=== Complete Toyota Racing Series results ===
(key) (Races in bold indicate pole position) (Races in italics indicate fastest lap)

Year	Team	1	2	3	4	5	6	7	8	9	10	11	12	13	14	15	DC	Points
2020	M2 Competition	HIG; 1; 2	HIG; 2; 7	HIG; 3; 3	**TER**; **1**; 3	TER; 2; 6	TER; 3; 2	HMP; 1; 1	HMP; 2; 4	**HMP**; **3**; 1	PUK; 1; 2	PUK; 2; 5	PUK; 3; 8	MAN; 1; 1	MAN; 2; 4	**MAN**; **3**; 1	1st	362

=== Complete FIA Formula 3 Championship results ===
(key) (Races in bold indicate pole position) (Races in italics indicate fastest lap)

Year	Entrant	1	2	3	4	5	6	7	8	9	10	11	12	13	14	15	16	17	18	DC	Points
2020	Charouz Racing System	RBR; FEA; 16	RBR; SPR; 25	RBR; FEA; 26	RBR; SPR; 14	HUN; FEA; 15	HUN; SPR; Ret	SIL; FEA; 15	SIL; SPR; Ret	SIL; FEA; 18	SIL; SPR; 10	CAT; FEA; 24	CAT; SPR; 18	SPA; FEA; 19	SPA; SPR; 27	MNZ; FEA; 24	MNZ; SPR; 17	MUG; FEA	MUG; SPR	24th	1

=== Complete Super Formula Lights results ===
(key) (Races in bold indicate pole position) (Races in italics indicate fastest lap)

Year	Entrant	1	2	3	4	5	6	7	8	9	10	11	12	13	14	15	16	17	18	Pos	Points
2023	B-Max Racing Team	AUT; 1 Ret	AUT; 2; 4	AUT; 3; 7	SUG; 1; 2	SUG; 2; 6	SUG; 3; 1	SUZ; 1 Ret	SUZ; 2; 9	SUZ; 3; 7	FUJ; 1; 8	FUJ; 2; 4	FUJ; 3; 8	OKA; 1; 2	**OKA**; **2**; 2	OKA; 3; 2	MOT; 1; 3	MOT; 2; 2	MOT; 3; 4	4th	62

=== Complete Super GT results ===
Year	Team	Car	Class	1	2	3	4	5	6	7	8	9	DC	Pts
2023	Anest Iwata Racing with Arnage	Lexus RC F GT3	GT300	OKA; 12	FUJ; 14	SUZ; 17	FUJ; 19	SUZ; 10	SUG; 7	AUT; 11	MOT; 17		23rd	5
2024	Anest Iwata Racing with Arnage	Lexus RC F GT3	GT300	OKA; 17	FUJ; 14	SUZ; 14	FUJ; 20	SUG; 18	AUT; Ret	MOT; Ret	SUZ; 21		NC	0
2025	Anest Iwata Racing	Lexus RC F GT3	GT300	OKA; 2	FUJ; 11	SEP	FS1; 14	FS2 (18)	SUG; Ret	AUT; Ret	MOT; 11	SUZ; 20	18th	31
2026	Modulo Nakajima Racing	Honda Prelude-GT	GT500	OKA; 13	FUJ; 12	FUJ; Ret	SUZ; 12	**SUG**; 12	**AUT**; 12	**MOT**; 2	MOT; 12		14th	18

=== Complete Super Formula results ===
Year	Team	Engine	1	2	3	4	5	6	7	8	9	10	11	12	DC	Points
2025	PONOS Nakajima Racing	Honda	SUZ; 18	SUZ; 5	MOT; 3^{3}	MOT; 9	AUT; 8	FUJ; 9	FUJ; 18	SUG; 6	FUJ; 8	SUZ; 2^{3}	SUZ; 1^{2}	SUZ; 4	6th	77.5
2026	PONOS Nakajima Racing	Honda	MOT	MOT	AUT	SUZ	SUZ	FUJ	FUJ	SUG	FUJ	FUJ	SUZ	SUZ		

^{‡} Half points awarded as less than 75% of race distance was completed.
^{*} Season still in progress.

== Notes ==
Sporting positions
Preceded by Liam Lawson	Toyota Racing Series; Champion; 2020	Succeeded by Incumbent
Preceded by Liam Lawson	New Zealand Grand Prix; Winner; 2020	Succeeded by Shane van Gisbergen
