= Carlos Cunha =

Brazilian racing driver

- Nationality: (Brazil) Brazilian
- Born: August 11, 1999 (age 27) São Paulo

Pro Mazda Championship career
- Debut season: 2017
- Current team: Team Pelfrey
- Car number: 81

Previous series
- 2015–16: Brazilian Formula Three Championship

Carlos Cunha Filho (born August 11, 1999) is a Brazilian race car driver. He is the son of Carlos Cunha, businessman and former race car driver in the 1990s.

== Racing record ==
=== Racing career summary ===
Season	Series	Team	Races	Wins	Poles	F/Laps	Podiums	Points	Position
2015	Formula 3 Brasil	CF3	16	0	0	0	6	105	**3rd**
2016	Formula 3 Brasil	CF3	10	1	0	1	6	65	5th
2017	Pro Mazda Championship	Team Pelfrey	12	0	1	1	6	237	**3rd**
2018	Pro Mazda Championship	Juncos Racing	13	0	0	1	5	252	6th
2024	NASCAR Brasil Sprint Race	Maxxon Racing	2	0	?	?	1	46	20th

=== Complete Formula 3 Brasil results ===
(key) (Races in bold indicate pole position) (Races in italics indicate fastest lap)

Year	Entrant	1	2	3	4	5	6	7	8	9	10	11	12	13	14	15	16	17	Pos	Points
2015	CF3	CUR1; 1; 10	CUR1; 2 Ret	VEL; 1; 4	VEL; 2; 3	SCS; 1; 3	SCS; 2; 2	CUR2; 1; 4	CUR2; 2; 5	CAS; 1; 11	CAS; 2; 3	CGR; 1; 2	CGR; 2; 4	CUR3; 1; 4	CUR3; 2; 5	INT; 1; 2	INT; 2 DSQ		3rd	105
2016	CF3	VEL; 1; 1	VEL; 2; 2	SCS; 1 Ret	SCS; 2 C	CAS; 1; 10	CAS; 2; 7	CAS; 3 Ret	INT; 1; 3	INT; 2; 3	LON; 1; 3	LON; 2; 3	CUR; 1	CUR; 2	GOI; 1	GOI; 2	INT; 1	INT; 2	5th	65

=== American open–wheel racing ===
==== Pro Mazda Championship ====
(key) (Races in bold indicate pole position; races in italics indicate fastest lap)

Year	Team	1	2	3	4	5	6	7	8	9	10	11	12	13	14	15	16	Rank	Points
2017	Team Pelfrey	STP; 4	STP; 12	IMS; 4	IMS; 3	ROA; 9	ROA; 4	MOH; 4	MOH; 3	MOH; 3	GMP; 3	WGL; 3	WGL; 2					3rd	237
2018	Juncos Racing	STP; 4	STP; 3	BAR; 10	BAR; 3	IMS; 4	IMS; 2	LOR; 2	ROA; 6	ROA; 6	TOR; 2	TOR; 10	MOH; 4	MOH; 12	GMP	POR	POR	6th	252
