= 2019 Porsche Cup Brasil =

Motor racing competition

The 2019 Porsche Império GT3 Cup Challenge Brasil is the first one-make Porsche racing championship in South America for 911 GT3 Cup cars and this was the fifteenth season. It began on March 16 at Autódromo José Carlos Pace and finished on November 12 at the same venue. It was first held in 2005 and follows the same formula basis used in the Porsche Supercup and Porsche Carrera Cup championships held around the world.

== Race Calendar and Results ==
=== Carrera Cup ===
Race	Circuit	Date	Pole position	Fastest lap	Winning driver	Winning GT3
1	(Brazil) Autódromo José Carlos Pace, São Paulo	16 March	(Brazil) Vitor Baptista	(Brazil) Miguel Paludo	(Brazil) Marçal Muller	(Brazil) Rodrigo Mello
2	(Brazil) Autódromo José Carlos Pace, São Paulo	16 March		(Brazil) Vitor Baptista	(Brazil) Vitor Baptista	(Brazil) Tom Filho
3	(Brazil) Autódromo Internacional de Curitiba, Curitiba	27 April	(Brazil) Marcel Coletta	(Brazil) Werner Neugebauer	(Brazil) Werner Neugebauer	(Brazil) Rodrigo Mello
4	(Brazil) Autódromo Internacional de Curitiba, Curitiba	27 April		(Brazil) Vitor Baptista	(Brazil) Vitor Baptista	(Brazil) Adalberto Baptista
5	(Brazil) Autódromo Velo Città, Mogi Guaçu	1 June	(Brazil) Marçal Müller	(Brazil) Marcel Coletta	(Brazil) Marcel Coletta	(Brazil) Sylvio de Barros
6	(Brazil) Autódromo Velo Città, Mogi Guaçu	1 June		(Brazil) Marcel Coletta	(Brazil) Marcel Coletta	(Brazil) Sylvio de Barros
7	(Portugal) Autódromo Fernanda Pires da Silva	2 August	(Brazil) Marcel Coletta	(Brazil) Marçal Müller	(Brazil) Vitor Baptista	(Brazil) Sylvio de Barros
8	(Portugal) Autódromo Fernanda Pires da Silva	2 August		Race cancelled due to an accident in the shakedown with test driver Dennis Dirani.		
9	(Brazil) Autódromo José Carlos Pace, São Paulo	21 September				
10	(Brazil) Autódromo José Carlos Pace, São Paulo	21 September				
11	(Brazil) Autódromo José Carlos Pace, São Paulo	11 November				
12	(Brazil) Autódromo José Carlos Pace, São Paulo	12 November				

=== Carrera Cup 3.8 ===
Race	Circuit	Date	Pole position	Fastest lap	Winning driver	Winning GT3 3.8
1	(Brazil) Autódromo José Carlos Pace, São Paulo	16 March	(Brazil) Enzo Elias	(Brazil) Enzo Elias	(Brazil) Enzo Elias	(Brazil) Urubatan Junior
2	(Brazil) Autódromo José Carlos Pace, São Paulo	16 March		(Brazil) Felipe Baptista	(Brazil) Felipe Baptista	(Brazil) Nelson Monteiro
3	(Brazil) Autódromo Internacional de Curitiba, Curitiba	27 April	(Brazil) Felipe Baptista	(Brazil) Enzo Elias	(Brazil) Enzo Elias	(Brazil) Fran Lara
4	(Brazil) Autódromo Internacional de Curitiba, Curitiba	27 April		(Brazil) Felipe Baptista	(Brazil) Matheus Iorio	(Brazil) Fran Lara
5	(Brazil) Autódromo Velo Città, Mogi Guaçu	1 June	(Brazil) Enzo Elias	(Brazil) Felipe Baptista	(Brazil) Felipe Baptista	(Brazil) Nelson Monteiro
6	(Brazil) Autódromo Velo Città, Mogi Guaçu	1 June		(Brazil) Enzo Elias	(Brazil) Matheus Iorio	(Brazil) Fran Lara
7	(Portugal) Autódromo Fernanda Pires da Silva	2 August	(Brazil) Enzo Elias	(Brazil) Enzo Elias	(Brazil) Enzo Elias	(Brazil) Fran Lara
8	(Portugal) Autódromo Fernanda Pires da Silva	2 August		Race cancelled due to an accident in the shakedown with test driver Dennis Dirani.		
9	(Brazil) Autódromo José Carlos Pace, São Paulo	21 September				
10	(Brazil) Autódromo José Carlos Pace, São Paulo	21 September				
11	(Brazil) Autódromo José Carlos Pace, São Paulo	11 November				
12	(Brazil) Autódromo José Carlos Pace, São Paulo	12 November				

== Drivers' Championship ==
Points are awarded for each race at an event to the driver/s of a car that completed at least 70% of the race distance and was running at the completion of the race. The sprint races has the partially top 6 reserve grid. Only the best 10 results in each series counts for the championship.

Points format	Position														
Points format	1st	2nd	3rd	4th	5th	6th	7th	8th	9th	10th	11th	12th	13th	14th	15th
Feature race	22	20	18	16	14	12	10	9	8	7	6	5	4	3	2
Reserve grid race	20	18	16	14	12	10	9	8	7	6	5	4	3	2	1

=== Carrera Cup ===
Pos	Driver	INT (Brazil)		CUR (Brazil)		VEC (Brazil)		EST (Portugal)		INT (Brazil)	INT (Brazil)	Pts	GT3
1	(Brazil) Vitor Baptista	**3**	1	2	1	3	5	1	C			108	-
2	(Brazil) Marçal Müller	1	5	3	4	**2**	10	2	C			92	-
3	(Brazil) Ricardo Baptista	5	4	5	5	6	3	7	C			80	-
4	(Brazil) Miguel Paludo	4	3	16	6	4	4	Ret	C			72	-
5	(Brazil) Eloi Khouri	6	2	5	9	7	6	4	C			71	-
6	(Brazil) Werner Neugebauer	2	Ret	1	7	5	Ret	DSQ	C			65	-
7	(Brazil) Marcel Colleta	11	Ret	**18**	3	1	1	**3**	C			64	-
8	(Brazil) Alceu Feldmann			4	2	10	2					59	-
9	(Brazil) Daniel Schneider							5	C			49	-
9	(Brazil) Pedrinho Aguiar	9	6	6	8	9	11	6	C			49	-
10	(Brazil) Rodrigo Mello	7	Ret	8	15	13	8	11	C			32	42
11	(Brazil) Maurizio Billi	8	Ret	11	18	11	9	17	C			28	33
12=	(Brazil) Adalberto Baptista	10	Ret	10	10	12	Ret	10	C			25	34
12=	(Brazil) Sylvio de Barros	17	DSQ	14	14	8	7	8	C			25	34
14	(France) Dominique Teysseyre	Ret	11	13	17	14	12	9	C			18	23
15=	(Brazil) Tom Filho	12	7	17	16			16	C			14	19
15=	(Brazil) Rouman Ziemkiewicz	DSQ	8	14	13			13	C			14	17
15=	(Brazil) Marco Foressi			12	12	15	13					14	21
15	(Brazil) Rodolfo Toni							14	C				21
15	(Brazil) Neto							15	C				21
18	(Brazil) Carlos Ambrosio			9	11			12	C			13	18
19	(Brazil) Carlos Renaux	13	Ret									4	6
Pos	Driver	INT (Brazil)		CUR (Brazil)		VEC (Brazil)		EST (Portugal)		INT (Brazil)	INT (Brazil)	Pts	GT3

Colour	Result
Gold	Winner
Silver	Second place
Bronze	Third place
Green	Points classification
Blue	Non-points classification
Blue	Non-classified finish (NC)
Purple	Retired, not classified (Ret)
Red	Did not qualify (DNQ)
Red	Did not pre-qualify (DNPQ)
Black	Disqualified (DSQ)
White	Did not start (DNS)
White	Withdrew (WD)
White	Race cancelled (C)
Blank	Did not practice (DNP)
Blank	Did not arrive (DNA)
Blank	Excluded (EX)

**Bold** – Pole position
Italics – Fastest lap
† – Retired, but classified

=== Carrera Cup 3.8 ===
Pos	Driver	INT (Brazil)		CUR (Brazil)		VEC (Brazil)		EST (Portugal)		INT (Brazil)	INT (Brazil)	Pts	GT3 3.8
1	(Brazil) Enzo Elias	**1**	2	1	2	**2**	2	**1**	C			118	-
2	(Brazil) Felipe Baptista	5	1	**3**	3	1	3	2	C			106	-
3	(Brazil) Matheus Iorio	3	Ret	2	1	3	1	3	C			96	-
4	(Brazil) Marcelo Tomasoni	7	7	5	4	6	4	10	C			73	-
5	(Brazil) Urubatan Junior	4	6	9	7	10	6	12				60	**44**
6	(Brazil) Nelson Monteiro	6	3	Ret	9	4	10	8	C			57	**40**
7	(Brazil) Fran Lara	9	13	4	6	9	5	5	C			56	**45**
8	(Brazil) Ramon Alcaraz	8	8	Ret	13	8	7	9	C			38	27
9	(Brazil) Marco Billi	12	9	6	10	11	Ret	14	C			36	25
10=	(Brazil) Nelsinho Marc	16	10	10	8	7	Ret	Ret	C			30	20
10=	(Brazil) Francisco Horta	15	Ret	8	15	5	12	6	C			30	18
12=	(Brazil) Cesar Uhrani	13	Ret	7	18	Ret	8	7	C			22	16
12=	(Egypt) Ayman Darwich	19	5	12	12	Ret	15					22	12
14	(Brazil) Paulo Totaro	18	4	Ret	19	16	9	20	C			21	12
15	(Brazil) Murillo Colleta	2	Ret									20	-
16	(Brazil) Andre Gaidzinski	10	Ret	11	14	15	DSQ	18	C			17	11
17	(Brazil) Eduardo Menossi	14	9	Ret	16	13	14	17	C			15	2
	(Portugal) Pedro Marreiros							4	C			12	-
18	(Brazil) Raphael Reis			DSQ	5							12	-
19=	(Brazil) José Vitte					12	11					10	5
19=	(Brazil) Leonardo Sanchez	21	12	12	17	Ret	13	13	C			10	0
21	(Brazil) Alessandro Marchini	11	14									7	5
22	(Brazil) Gustavo Kiryla			Ret	11							5	-
23	(South Korea) Sangho Kim	20	11	Ret	DSQ			15	C			4	0
24	(Brazil) Zeca Feffer					14	Ret	11	C			3	0
	(Brazil) Paulo Pomelli							16	C			0	0
	(Brazil) Matheus Colleta	17	Ret									0	-
Pos	Driver	INT (Brazil)		CUR (Brazil)		VEC (Brazil)		EST (Portugal)		INT (Brazil)	INT (Brazil)	Pts	GT3 3.8

Colour	Result
Gold	Winner
Silver	Second place
Bronze	Third place
Green	Points classification
Blue	Non-points classification
Blue	Non-classified finish (NC)
Purple	Retired, not classified (Ret)
Red	Did not qualify (DNQ)
Red	Did not pre-qualify (DNPQ)
Black	Disqualified (DSQ)
White	Did not start (DNS)
White	Withdrew (WD)
White	Race cancelled (C)
Blank	Did not practice (DNP)
Blank	Did not arrive (DNA)
Blank	Excluded (EX)

**Bold** – Pole position
Italics – Fastest lap
† – Retired, but classified
