= 2016 Formula 3 Brasil season =

The 2016 Fórmula 3 Brasil season is the tenth Fórmula 3 Brasil season and the second since 1995, replacing the Formula 3 Sudamericana series as the highest-profile single-seater championship on the continent.

== Drivers and teams ==
All cars are powered by Berta engines and run on Pirelli tyres.

Team	No.	Driver	Chassis	Rounds
Class A
(Brazil) Prop Car Racing	7	(Brazil) Fernando Galera	Dallara F309	8
(Brazil) Prop Car Racing	27	(Brazil) Matheus Muniz	Dallara F309	1–4
(Brazil) Prop Car Racing	55	(Brazil) Igor Fraga	Dallara F309	1, 8
(Brazil) RR Racing	10	(Brazil) Luiz Felipe Branquinho	Dallara F309	1–5
(Brazil) RR Racing	87	(Brazil) Leonardo Raucci	Dallara F309	1–4
(Brazil) CF3	12	(Brazil) Christian Hahn	Dallara F309	All
(Brazil) CF3	54	(Brazil) Carlos Cunha Filho	Dallara F309	1–5
(Brazil) Cesário F3	34	(Brazil) Matheus Iorio	Dallara F309	All
(Brazil) Cesário F3	77	(Brazil) Guilherme Samaia	Dallara F309	All
(United Kingdom) Hitech Racing	36	(Brazil) Thiago Vivacqua	Dallara F309	1–7
(United Kingdom) Hitech Racing	95	(Brazil) Yurik Carvalho	Dallara F309	1–2
(Brazil) Fortunato F3 Racing	41	(Brazil) Artur Fortunato	Dallara F309	1–4, 8
(United Kingdom) Hitech GP	43	(Brazil) Pedro Cardoso	Dallara F309	1–3
(United Kingdom) Hitech GP	52	(Brazil) Pedro Caland	Dallara F309	7–8
(Brazil) Kemba Racing	91	(Brazil) Leonardo de Souza	Dallara F309	1–3, 6
Class B
(Brazil) RR Racing Light	3	(Brazil) Leandro Guedes	Dallara F301	1–2
(Brazil) Prop Car Racing	48	(Brazil) Renan Pietrowski	Dallara F301	1, 3
(Brazil) Cesário F3	45	(Brazil) Lukas Moraes	Dallara F301	6
(Brazil) Cesário F3	145	(Brazil) Denis Dirani	Dallara F301	7
(United Kingdom) Hitech GP	52	(Brazil) Pedro Caland	Dallara F301	1–6
(Brazil) Fortunato F3 Racing	67	(Brazil) Felipe Santo André	Dallara F301	8

== Race calendar and results ==
The calendar for the 2016 season was released on 17 December 2015, with the category being part of the Stock Car Brasil package. All races are supporting this championship and are held in Brazil.

Round		Circuit	Date	Pole position	Fastest lap	Winning driver	Winning team	Class B Winner
1	R1	Velopark, Nova Santa Rita	9 April	(Brazil) Matheus Iorio	(Brazil) Matheus Iorio	(Brazil) Carlos Cunha Filho	(Brazil) CF3	(Brazil) Renan Pietrowski
1	R2	Velopark, Nova Santa Rita	10 April		(Brazil) Carlos Cunha	(Brazil) Matheus Iorio	(Brazil) Cesário F3	(Brazil) Renan Pietrowski
2	R1	Autódromo Internacional de Santa Cruz do Sul	5 June	(Brazil) Matheus Iorio	(Brazil) Matheus Iorio	(Brazil) Matheus Iorio	(Brazil) Cesário F3	(Brazil) Pedro Caland
2	R2	Autódromo Internacional de Santa Cruz do Sul	5 June	Race cancelled (Note: Due to adverse weather conditions, the second race at Santa Cruz do Sul was cancelled. The race was rescheduled for the meeting held at Cascavel to be the first race of a triple-header round.)				
3	R1	Autódromo Internacional de Cascavel	16 July		(Brazil) Guilherme Samaia	(Brazil) Matheus Iorio	(Brazil) Cesário F3	no finishers
3	R2	Autódromo Internacional de Cascavel	16 July	(Brazil) Artur Fortunato	(Brazil) Matheus Iorio	(Brazil) Matheus Iorio	(Brazil) Cesário F3	(Brazil) Renan Pietrowski
3	R3	Autódromo Internacional de Cascavel	17 July		(Brazil) Matheus Iorio	(Brazil) Matheus Iorio	(Brazil) Cesário F3	(Brazil) Renan Pietrowski
4	R1	Autódromo José Carlos Pace	11 September	(Brazil) Guilherme Samaia	(Brazil) Guilherme Samaia	(Brazil) Guilherme Samaia	(Brazil) Cesário F3	no finishers
4	R2	Autódromo José Carlos Pace	11 September		(Brazil) Matheus Iorio	(Brazil) Matheus Iorio	(Brazil) Cesário F3	(Brazil) Pedro Caland
5	R1	Autódromo Internacional Ayrton Senna (Londrina)	25 September	(Brazil) Matheus Iorio	(Brazil) Matheus Iorio	(Brazil) Matheus Iorio	(Brazil) Cesário F3	(Brazil) Pedro Caland
5	R2	Autódromo Internacional Ayrton Senna (Londrina)	25 September		(Brazil) Guilherme Samaia	(Brazil) Guilherme Samaia	(Brazil) Cesário F3	no finishers
6	R1	Autódromo Internacional de Curitiba	16 October	(Brazil) Guilherme Samaia	(Brazil) Matheus Iorio	(Brazil) Matheus Iorio	(Brazil) Cesário F3	(Brazil) Pedro Caland
6	R2	Autódromo Internacional de Curitiba	16 October		(Brazil) Matheus Iorio	(Brazil) Guilherme Samaia	(Brazil) Cesário F3	(Brazil) Pedro Caland
7	R1	Autódromo Internacional Ayrton Senna (Goiânia)	6 November	(Brazil) Christian Hahn	(Brazil) Christian Hahn	(Brazil) Matheus Iorio	(Brazil) Cesário F3	no finishers
7	R2	Autódromo Internacional Ayrton Senna (Goiânia)	6 November		(Brazil) Matheus Iorio	(Brazil) Christian Hahn	(Brazil) CF3	no finishers
8	R1	Autódromo José Carlos Pace	11 December	(Brazil) Matheus Iorio	(Brazil) Matheus Iorio	(Brazil) Matheus Iorio	(Brazil) Cesário F3	no finishers
8	R2	Autódromo José Carlos Pace	11 December		(Brazil) Matheus Iorio	(Brazil) Artur Fortunato	(Brazil) Fortunato F3 Racing	no finishers

== Championship standings ==
Scoring system

Position	**1st**	**2nd**	**3rd**	**4th**	**5th**	**6th**	**7th**	**8th**
Points	15	12	9	7	5	3	2	1

Pos	Driver	VEL		SCS		CAS			INT		LON		CUR		GOI		INT		Pts
Class A
1	(Brazil) Matheus Iorio	**Ret**	1	**1**	C	1	1	1	2	1	**1**	4	1	2	1	2	**1**	2	205
2	(Brazil) Guilherme Samaia	2	Ret	Ret	C	5	3	2	**1**	4	5	1	**2**	1	2	3	2	Ret	140
3	(Brazil) Christian Hahn	11	9	5	C	4	5	3	Ret	5	4	5	3	Ret	**4**	1	3	5	90
4	(Brazil) Thiago Vivacqua	8	Ret	3	C	3	4	7	4	7	2	2	4	3	Ret	5			85
5	(Brazil) Carlos Cunha	1	2	Ret	C	10	7	Ret	3	3	3	3							65
6	(Brazil) Artur Fortunato	3	10	Ret	C	8	**2**	9	7	2							6	1	57
7	(Brazil) Pedro Cardoso	4	3	2	C	6	DSQ	DSQ											31
8	(Brazil) Pedro Caland														3	4	4	4	30
9	(Brazil) Leonardo de Souza	Ret	4	6	C	2	12	Ret					6	Ret					27
10	(Brazil) Matheus Muniz	Ret	5	4	C	7	6	8	6	6									26
11	(Brazil) Igor Fraga	5	Ret														5	3	19
12	(Brazil) Luis Felipe Branquinho	6	Ret	8	C	9	8	Ret	5	8	6	6							17
13	(Brazil) Leonardo Raucci	Ret	Ret	7	C	Ret	9	4	Ret	10									9
14	(Brazil) Yurik Carvalho	7	6	10	C														5
	(Brazil) Fernando Galera																Ret	Ret	0
Class B
1	(Brazil) Pedro Caland	10	8	**9**	C	Ret	**11**	6	DSQ	9	**7**	Ret	**5**	4					123
2	(Brazil) Renan Pietrowski	**9**	7			DNS	10	5											60
	(Brazil) Lukas Moraes												Ret	Ret					0
	(Brazil) Denis Dirani														**Ret**	Ret			0
	(Brazil) Leandro Guedes	Ret	Ret	Ret	C														0
	(Brazil) Felipe Santo André																**Ret**	DNS	0
Pos	Driver	VEL		SCS		CAS			INT		LON		CUR		GOI		INT		Pts

Colour	Result
Gold	Winner
Silver	Second place
Bronze	Third place
Green	Points classification
Blue	Non-points classification
Blue	Non-classified finish (NC)
Purple	Retired, not classified (Ret)
Red	Did not qualify (DNQ)
Red	Did not pre-qualify (DNPQ)
Black	Disqualified (DSQ)
White	Did not start (DNS)
White	Withdrew (WD)
White	Race cancelled (C)
Blank	Did not practice (DNP)
Blank	Did not arrive (DNA)
Blank	Excluded (EX)

**Bold** – Pole position
Italics – Fastest lap
† – Retired, but classified
