= 2017 Formula 3 Brasil season =

The 2017 Fórmula 3 Brasil season was the eleventh and final season of Fórmula 3 Brasil and the fourth since 1995, replacing the Formula 3 Sudamericana series as the highest-profile single-seater championship on the continent. In this season F3 Brasil will no longer with Stock Car Brasil and will be part of Porsche GT3 Cup Brasil event.

== Drivers and teams ==
The following Brazilian teams (with the exception of British-based Hitech) and drivers are registered. All cars are powered by Berta engines and run on Pirelli tyres. This year Academy Class replacing class B.

Team	No.	Drivers	Class	Car	Rounds
Full Time	5	(Brazil) Vitor Baptista		Dallara F309	1
Full Time	67	(Brazil) Rafael Barranco	Academy	Dallara F301	1
Cesário F3	7	(Brazil) Murilo Coletta		Dallara F309	1–4, 8
Cesário F3	12	(Brazil) Christian Hahn		Dallara F309	2, 5
Cesário F3	28	(Brazil) Nicolas Filter	Academy	Dallara F301	3
Cesário F3	28	(Brazil) Arthur Leist	Academy	Dallara F301	5
Cesário F3	28	(Brazil) Pedro Saderi	Academy	Dallara F301	5
Cesário F3	28	(Brazil) Rafael Grandi		Dallara F309	6
Cesário F3	28	(Brazil) Raphael Abbate		Dallara F309	8
Cesário F3	45	(Brazil) Sérgio Henrique	Academy	Dallara F301	1
Cesário F3	77	(Brazil) Guilherme Samaia		Dallara F309	All
Cesário F3	177	(Brazil) Marcel Coletta	Academy	Dallara F301	1–4
Prop Car Racing	12	(Argentina) Hernán Palazzo		Dallara F309	5
Prop Car Racing	17	(Brazil) Emilio Padron		Dallara F309	5, 7–8
Prop Car Racing	34	(Brazil) Matheus Santa’anna	Academy	Dallara F301	3
Prop Car Racing	54	(Brazil) Igor Fraga	Academy	Dallara F301	All
Prop Car Racing	55	(Brazil) Leonardo Barbosa	Academy	Dallara F301	All
Engmakers Racing	12	(Brazil) Giuliano Raucci		Dallara F309	1
Engmakers Racing	119	(Brazil) Pedro Goulart	Academy	Dallara F301	1
Hitech Racing	28	(Brazil) Diego Ramos	Academy	Dallara F301	2
Hitech Racing	52	(Brazil) Pedro Caland		Dallara F309	1
Hitech Racing	73	(Brazil) Enzo Elias	Academy	Dallara F301	All
Fortunato Racing	41	(Brazil) Arthur Fortunato		Dallara F309	2–4
Fortunato Racing	67	(Brazil) Alberto Cesár	Academy	Dallara F301	2
Dragão Motorsports	48	(Brazil) Renan Pietrowski		Dallara F301	4
Dragão Motorsports	48	(Brazil) Lucas Okada		Dallara F301	8
Kemba Racing	62	(Brazil) Airton Santos		Dallara F309	2–4
Kemba Racing	91	(Brazil) Leonardo de Souza		Dallara F309	1, 5–8
RDC Motorsport	112	(Brazil) Giuliano Raucci	Academy	Dallara F309	2–7
RDC Motorsport	119	(Brazil) Pedro Goulart	Academy	Dallara F301	2–8

== Results and standings ==
Race	Circuit	Date	Pole position	Fastest lap	Winning driver	Winning team	Academy winner
1	Autódromo Internacional de Curitiba	18 March	(Brazil) Vitor Baptista	(Brazil) Guilherme Samaia	(Brazil) Guilherme Samaia	Cesário F3	(Brazil) Marcel Coletta
2	Autódromo Internacional de Curitiba	18 March		(Brazil) Murilo Coletta	(Brazil) Murilo Coletta	Cesário F3	(Brazil) Marcel Coletta
3	Autódromo José Carlos Pace	6 May	(Brazil) Guilherme Samaia	(Brazil) Guilherme Samaia	(Brazil) Guilherme Samaia	Cesário F3	(Brazil) Igor Fraga
4	Autódromo José Carlos Pace	6 May		(Brazil) Christian Hahn	(Brazil) Guilherme Samaia	Cesário F3	(Brazil) Enzo Elias
5	Autódromo Velo Città	3 June	(Brazil) Guilherme Samaia	(Brazil) Guilherme Samaia	(Brazil) Guilherme Samaia	Cesário F3	(Brazil) Marcel Coletta
6	Autódromo Velo Città	3 June		(Brazil) Guilherme Samaia	(Brazil) Guilherme Samaia	Cesário F3	(Brazil) Igor Fraga
7	Autódromo José Carlos Pace	1 July	(Brazil) Arthur Fortunato	(Brazil) Guilherme Samaia	(Brazil) Guilherme Samaia	Cesário F3	(Brazil) Igor Fraga
8	Autódromo José Carlos Pace	1 July		(Brazil) Guilherme Samaia	(Brazil) Guilherme Samaia	Cesário F3	(Brazil) Igor Fraga
9	Autódromo Internacional de Santa Cruz do Sul	19 August	(Brazil) Guilherme Samaia	(Brazil) Guilherme Samaia	(Brazil) Giuliano Raucci	RDC Motorsport	(Brazil) Igor Fraga
10	Autódromo Internacional de Santa Cruz do Sul	19 August		(Brazil) Christian Hahn	(Brazil) Guilherme Samaia	Cesário F3	(Brazil) Igor Fraga
11	Autódromo Internacional Ayrton Senna (Londrina)	16 September	(Brazil) Guilherme Samaia	(Brazil) Giuliano Raucci	(Brazil) Guilherme Samaia	Cesário F3	(Brazil) Enzo Elias
12	Autódromo Internacional Ayrton Senna (Londrina)	16 September		(Brazil) Guilherme Samaia	(Brazil) Giuliano Raucci	RDC Motorsport	(Brazil) Igor Fraga
13	Autódromo Internacional Ayrton Senna (Goiânia)	19 November	(Brazil) Guilherme Samaia	(Brazil) Guilherme Samaia	(Brazil) Guilherme Samaia	Cesário F3	(Brazil) Igor Fraga
14	Autódromo Internacional Ayrton Senna (Goiânia)	19 November		(Brazil) Guilherme Samaia	(Brazil) Guilherme Samaia	Cesário F3	(Brazil) Igor Fraga
15	Autódromo José Carlos Pace	9 December	(Brazil) Guilherme Samaia	(Brazil) Guilherme Samaia	(Brazil) Guilherme Samaia	Cesário F3	(Brazil) Igor Fraga
16	Autódromo José Carlos Pace	9 December		(Brazil) Guilherme Samaia	(Brazil) Guilherme Samaia	Cesário F3	(Brazil) Leonardo Barbosa

== Championship standings ==
Scoring system

Position	**1st**	**2nd**	**3rd**	**4th**	**5th**	**6th**	**7th**	**8th**
Points	15	12	9	7	5	3	2	1

Pos	Driver	CUR		INT		VEC		INT		SCS		LON		GOI		INT		Pts
Class A
1	(Brazil) Guilherme Samaia	1	5	**1**	1	**1**	1	1	1	**8**	1	**1**	2	**1**	1	**1**	1	219
2	(Brazil) Giuliano Raucci	Ret	Ret	2	2	2	3	2	4	1	2	Ret	1	2	2			132
3	(Brazil) Leonardo de Souza	4	4							4	Ret	2	4	4	4	3	2	86
4	(Brazil) Murilo Colleta	3	1	4	4	4	Ret	3	2							7	Ret	66
5=	(Brazil) Arthur Fortunato			3	Ret	3	2	**5**	Ret									37
5=	(Brazil) Emilio Padron									Ret	5			6	5	5	3	37
7	(Brazil) Pedro Caland	2	2															24
8	(Argentina) Hernán Palazzo									2	3							21
9	(Brazil) Airton Santos			Ret	Ret	10	9	8	Ret									17
10	(Brazil) Christian Hahn			Ret	3					Ret	8							14
11=	(Brazil) Vitor Baptista	**Ret**	3															9
11=	(Brazil) Raphael Abbate															4	Ret	9
11=	(Brazil) Rafael Grandi											4	Ret					9
Academy Class
1	(Brazil) Igor Fraga	**Ret**	7	**5**	Ret	6	4	**4**	3	**3**	4	**7**	3	**3**	3	**2**	6	190
2	(Brazil) Leonardo Barbosa	8	10	Ret	6	9	8	9	7	5	7	6	5	7	6	6	4	136
3	(Brazil) Enzo Elias	6	Ret	7	5	7	6	Ret	6	6	6	3	7	5	Ret	Ret	5	132
4=	(Brazil) Marcel Colleta	5	5	6	Ret	**5**	5	6	5									93
4=	(Brazil) Pedro Goulart	7	9	Ret	DSQ	7	6	7	8	7	9	5	6	Ret	7	Ret	7	93
6	(Brazil) Lucas Okada															8	8	14
7	(Brazil) Rafael Barranco	Ret	8															9
8	(Brazil) Renan Pietrowski							10	Ret									5
	(Brazil) Sergio Henrique	Ret	Ret															0
	(Brazil) Matheus Santa’anna					Ret	Ret											0
	(Brazil) Pedro Saderi											Ret	Ret					0
	(Brazil) Alberto César			DNS	Ret													0
	(Brazil) Diego Ramos			DNS	DNS													0
	(Brazil) Nicolas Filter					DNS	DNS											0
	(Brazil) Arthur Leist							DNS	DNS									0
Pos	Driver	CUR		INT		VEC		INT		SCS		LON		GOI		INT		Pts

Colour	Result
Gold	Winner
Silver	Second place
Bronze	Third place
Green	Points classification
Blue	Non-points classification
Blue	Non-classified finish (NC)
Purple	Retired, not classified (Ret)
Red	Did not qualify (DNQ)
Red	Did not pre-qualify (DNPQ)
Black	Disqualified (DSQ)
White	Did not start (DNS)
White	Withdrew (WD)
White	Race cancelled (C)
Blank	Did not practice (DNP)
Blank	Did not arrive (DNA)
Blank	Excluded (EX)

**Bold** – Pole position
Italics – Fastest lap
† – Retired, but classified
