= 2020 Copa Truck season =

Truck racing competition

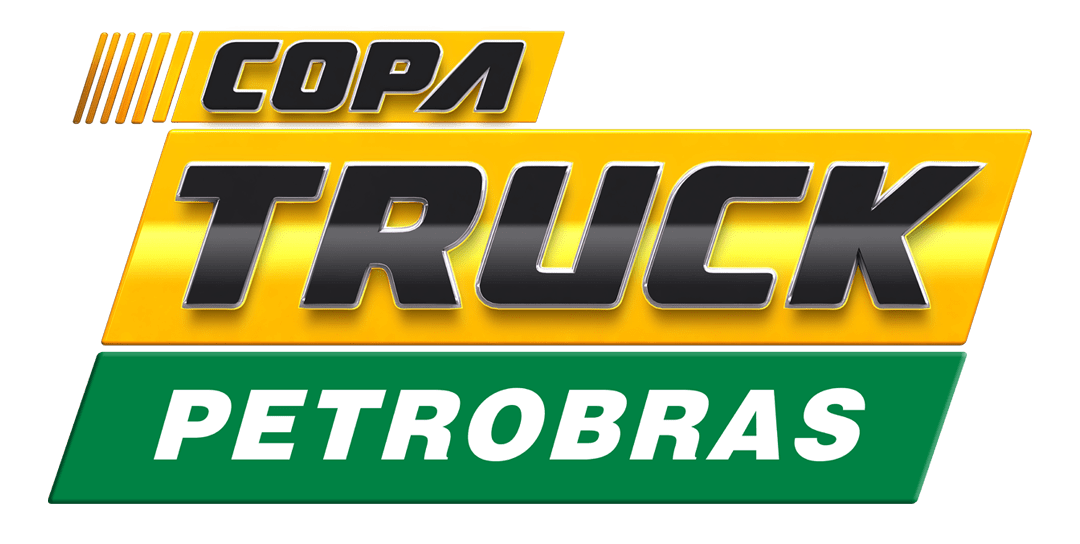
Official Logo

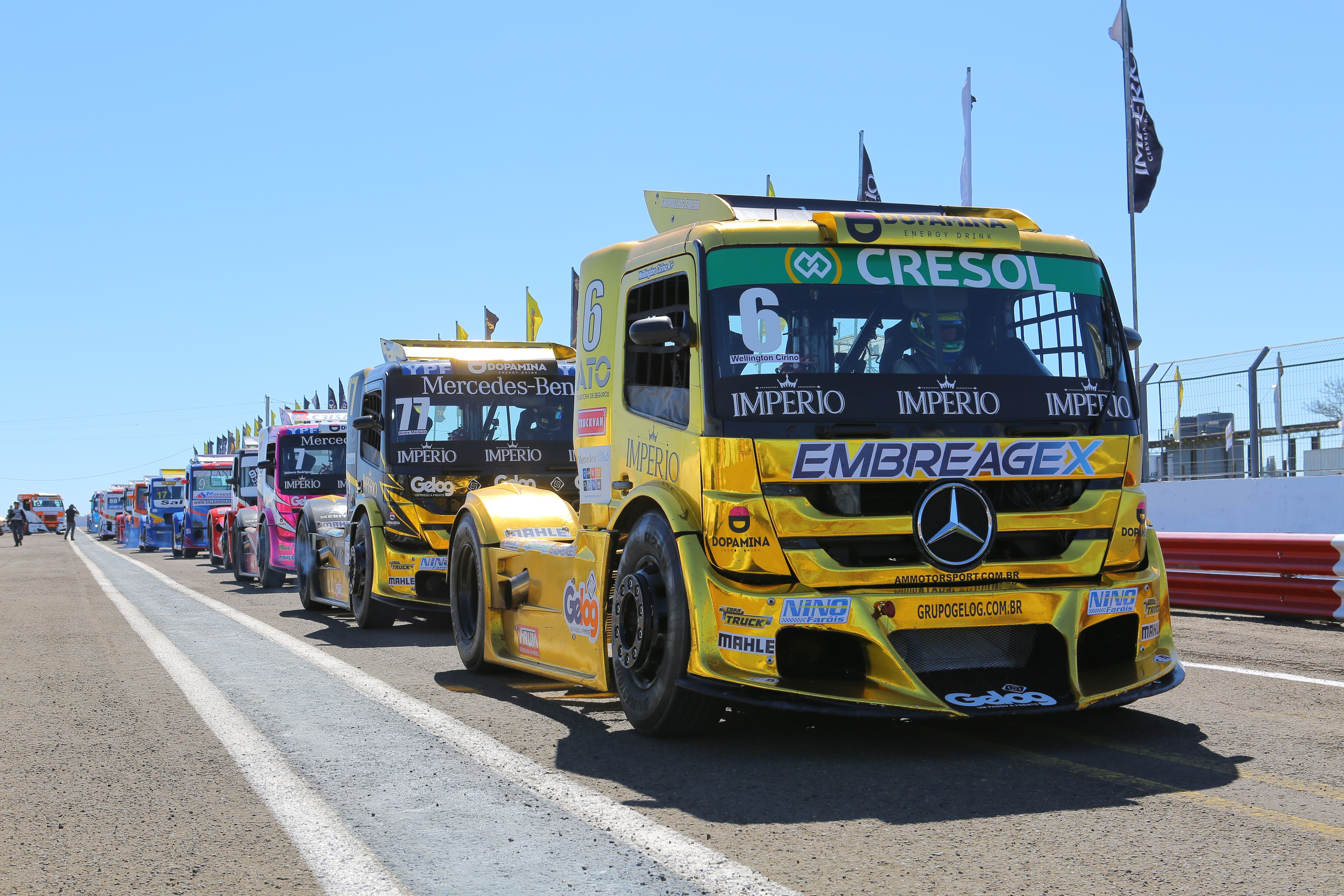
Copa Truck event

The 2020 Brazilian Truck Cup Championship was the fourth season of the Copa Truck. Beto Monteiro defended his previous years title and became the 2020 Copa Truck Champion in a Volkswagen from R9 Competições. In a Pandemic shortened schedule with a few double venue visits which came together around middle of the year, there were two new domestic Manufacturers present this year as well in Remanufatura Brasil and Protótipo.

== Season information ==
The category's origins came after nine teams left Formula Truck due to disagreements with the problematic management of Neusa Navarro Félix. These teams joined together in an association to create the category that replaced Formula Truck. The new category brings together teams and drivers from the old category.

In November 2017, it was approved by the Brazilian Automobile Confederation (CBA) and recognized as an official championship. Carlos Col, former head of the Stock Car Pro Series, is its promoter.

The Truck Cup was officially launched on April 27, 2017, in São Paulo. In the first season, the championship was divided into three regional cups: Midwest, Northeast, and Southeast. The first stage took place on May 28, in Goiânia, with 17 trucks on the grid.

The association is made up of the following teams: RM Competições, AJ5 Sports, DF Motorsport, RVR Motorsports, Dakar Motors, Fábio Fogaça Motorsports, Lucar Motorsports and Clay Truck Racing.

== Teams and drivers ==
All the drivers were Brazilian.

Team	Constructor	Tyre	No.	Driver	Rounds
RVR-Corinthians Motorsports	Mercedes-Benz	P	15	(São Paulo (state)) Roberval Andrade	1–3
Usual Iveco Racing	Iveco	P	4	(São Paulo (state)) Felipe Giaffone	1–3
Usual Iveco Racing	Iveco	P	21	(São Paulo (state)) Djalma Pivetta	1–3
Usual Iveco Racing	Iveco	P	2	(Paraná (state)) Valmir Benavides	2–3
AJ5 Eco Sports Reman Brasil	Reman Brasil	P	5	(São Paulo (state)) Adalberto Jardim	1–3
R9 Competições	Volkswagen	P	88	(Pernambuco) Beto Monteiro	1–3
R9 Competições	Volkswagen	P	55	(São Paulo (state)) Paulo Salustiano	1–3
R9 Competições	Volkswagen	P	54	(São Paulo (state)) Rafael Lopes	1–3
R9 Competições	Volkswagen	P	81	(São Paulo (state)) José Augusto Dias	1–3
R9 Competições	MAN SE	P	57	(Santa Catarina (state)) Felipe Tozzo	1
R9 Competições	MAN SE	P	9	(São Paulo (state)) Renato Martins	1
R9 Competições	MAN SE	P	00	(Santa Catarina (state)) Danilo Alamini	4-6
FF Motorsport	Protótipo	P	27	(São Paulo (state)) Fábio Fogaça	1–3
FF Motorsport	Protótipo	P	37	(Goiás) Raphael Teixeira	1–3
AM Motorsport	Mercedes-Benz	P	6	(Paraná (state)) Wellington Cirino	1–3
AM Motorsport	Mercedes-Benz	P	7	(Paraná (state)) Débora Rodrigues	1
AM Motorsport	Mercedes-Benz	P	9	(Paraná (state)) Débora Rodrigues	2–3
AM Motorsport	Mercedes-Benz	P	77	(São Paulo (state)) André Marques	1–3
AM Motorsport	Mercedes-Benz	P	777	(Paraíba) Valdeno Brito	1
JL Competições	Mercedes-Benz	P	73	(Paraná (state)) Leandro Totti	1
JL Competições	Mercedes-Benz	P	64	(São Paulo (state)) Evandro Camargo	1–3
Boessio Competições	Volvo	P	83	(Rio Grande do Sul) Régis Boessio	1
Lucar Motorsport	Iveco	P	99	(São Paulo (state)) Luiz Lopes	1–3
PP Motorsport	Mercedes-Benz	P	29	(Mato Grosso) Pedro Paulo Fernandes	2–3, 5–6
PP Motorsport	Mercedes-Benz	P	45	(São Paulo (state)) Daniel Kelemen	2–6
PP Motorsport	Mercedes-Benz	P	909	(São Paulo (state)) Alexandre Navarro	2–3
PP Motorsport	Mercedes-Benz	P	28	(São Paulo (state)) Danilo Dirani	4–6
BRUTO Motorsports	Scania	P	3	(São Paulo (state)) Ricardo Alvarez	5
Muffatão Racing	Scania	P	20	(Paraná (state)) Pedro Muffato	4, 6
JLT Team	Volvo	P	31	(São Paulo (state)) Glauco Barros	2–3
JLT Team	Volvo	P	331	(Paraná (state)) Cris Júlio	5–6

== Calendar ==
=== Schedule ===
Round	Date	Grand Prix	Circuit	City	Hours	Info
1	June 28	(Paraná (state)) Grande Prêmio de Cascavel	Autódromo Internacional de Cascavel	Cascavel, PR		
2	August 15	Grande Prêmio de Goiás	Autódromo Ayrton Senna	Goiânia, GO		
3	August 16	(Goiás) Grande Prêmio de Goiânia	Autódromo Ayrton Senna	Goiânia, GO		
4	October 4	(Paraná (state)) Grande Prêmio de Cascavel	Autódromo Internacional de Cascavel	Cascavel, PR		
5	November 8	(Paraná (state)) Grande Prêmio de Curitiba	Autódromo Internacional de Curitiba	Curitiba, PR		
6	December 13	(São Paulo (state)) Super Final de Interlagos	Autódromo de Interlagos	São Paulo, SP		

=== Results ===
Round	Circuit	Date	Pole position	Fastest lap	Winning driver	Winning team	Constructor	Ref.
1	(Paraná (state)) Cascavel	June 28	(Paraná (state)) Wellington Cirino	(São Paulo (state)) Roberval Andrade	(Paraná (state)) Wellington Cirino	(Brazil) AM Motorsport	Mercedes-Benz	
1	(Paraná (state)) Cascavel	June 28	No dispute	(Pernambuco) Beto Monteiro	(Pernambuco) Beto Monteiro	(Brazil) R9 Competições	Volkswagen	
2	Goiás	August 15	(Pernambuco) Beto Monteiro	(Pernambuco) Beto Monteiro	(Pernambuco) Beto Monteiro	(Brazil) R9 Competições	Volkswagen	
2	Goiás	August 15	No dispute	(São Paulo (state)) Rafael Lopes	(Pernambuco) Beto Monteiro	(Brazil) R9 Competições	Volkswagen	
3	(Goiás) Goiânia	August 16	(São Paulo (state)) Felipe Giaffone	(São Paulo (state)) Roberval Andrade	(São Paulo (state)) André Marques	(Brazil) AM Motorsport	Mercedes-Benz	
3	(Goiás) Goiânia	August 16	No dispute	(São Paulo (state)) Paulo Salustiano	(São Paulo (state)) Paulo Salustiano	(Brazil) R9 Competições	Volkswagen	
4	(Paraná (state)) Cascavel	October 4	(Paraná (state)) Leandro Totti	(São Paulo (state)) Rafael Lopes	(Paraíba) Valdeno Brito	(Brazil) AM Motorsport	Mercedes-Benz	
4	(Paraná (state)) Cascavel	October 4	No dispute	(São Paulo (state)) Danilo Dirani	(Paraíba) Valdeno Brito	(Brazil) AM Motorsport	Mercedes-Benz	
5	(Paraná (state)) Curitiba	November 8	(Paraná (state)) Wellington Cirino	(Paraná (state)) Wellington Cirino	(Pernambuco) Beto Monteiro	(Brazil) R9 Competições	Volkswagen	
5	(Paraná (state)) Curitiba	November 8	No dispute	(Pernambuco) Beto Monteiro	(São Paulo (state)) Paulo Salustiano	(Brazil) R9 Competições	Volkswagen	
6	(São Paulo (state)) São Paulo	December 13	(São Paulo (state)) Paulo Salustiano	(Pernambuco) Beto Monteiro	(Pernambuco) Beto Monteiro	(Brazil) R9 Competições	Volkswagen	
6	(São Paulo (state)) São Paulo	December 13	No dispute		(São Paulo (state)) Paulo Salustiano	(Brazil) R9 Competições	Volkswagen	

== Championship standings ==
=== Drivers' Championship ===
Pos	Driver	(Paraná (state)) CAS		(Goiás) GOI		(Goiás) GOI		(Paraná (state)) CAS		(Paraná (state)) CTB		(São Paulo (state)) INT		Pts
1	(Pernambuco) Beto Monteiro	4	1	1	1	2	8	16	RET	1	3	1	3	160
2	(São Paulo (state)) André Marques	3	3	4	RET	1	4	7	8	2	4	6	4	142
3	(São Paulo (state)) Danilo Dirani							6	10	3	2	5	2	139
4	(Paraná (state)) Wellington Cirino	1	4	2	RET	6	3	4	5	13	15	3	13	131
5	(São Paulo (state)) José Augusto Dias	8	RET	7	2	3	9	8	13	10	7	14	7	125
6	(São Paulo (state)) Felipe Giaffone	RET	7	3	RET	RET	NL	5	3	5	5	7	RET	123
7	(Paraíba) Valdeno Brito	2	RET					1	1	7	6			113
8	(São Paulo (state)) Paulo Salustiano	NL	NL	RET	RET	8	1	12	4	8	1	2	1	112
9	(São Paulo (state)) Roberval Andrade	5	2	RET	RET	4	2	3	15	RET	RET			86
10	(São Paulo (state)) Rafael Lopes	RET	5	5	6	RET	NL	2	RET	4	9	4	5	38
11	(Rio Grande do Sul) Régis Boessio	RET	10					15	9	16	12	8	6	27
12	(Paraná (state)) Débora Rodrigues	6	6	8	RET	5	RET	9	6	15	8	10	9	22
13	(São Paulo (state)) Djalma Pivetta	10	RET	10	4	9	5	17	11	RET	RET	11	10	17
14	(Santa Catarina (state)) Danilo Alamini							13	14	12	RET	9	14	15
15	Cris Júlio									18	RET	15	11	11
16	(São Paulo (state)) Luiz Lopes	RET	NL	9	3	10	RET	11	7			12	RET	10
17	(Mato Grosso) Pedro Paulo Fernandes			RET	RET	7	RET			11	RET	18	8	8
18	(Paraná (state)) Valmir Benavides			RET	RET	RET	NL					13	RET	8
19	(São Paulo (state)) Renato Martins	9	8									16	12	7
20	(São Paulo (state)) Adalberto Jardim	7	RET	6	RET	NL	NL	RET	RET	14	RET	RET	RET	4
21	(São Paulo (state)) Glauco Barros			12	5	14	7							0
22	(São Paulo (state)) Evandro Camargo	RET	12	13	RET	12	6	10	RET	RET	RET	RET	NL	0
23	(São Paulo (state)) Fábio Fogaça	RET	RET	11	RET	11	RET	RET	RET	RET	11	RET	NL	0
24	(São Paulo (state)) Daniel Kelemen			RET	RET	13	10	RET	RET	9	10	17	NL	0
25	(Santa Catarina (state)) Felipe Tozzo	RET	9											0
26	(Goiás) Raphael Teixeira	RET	11	RET	RET	RET	NL	18	12	RET	RET	RET	NL	0
27	(Paraná (state)) Leandro Totti	RET	RET					19	2	6	13			0
28	(São Paulo (state)) Alexandre Navarro			RET	RET	NL	NL	14	RET					0
29	(Paraná (state)) Pedro Muffato							20	RET			19	RET	0
30	(São Paulo (state)) Ricardo Alvarez									17	14			0
Pos	Driver	(Paraná (state)) CAS		(Goiás) GOI		(Goiás) GOI		(Paraná (state)) CAS		(Paraná (state)) CTB		(São Paulo (state)) INT		Pts

Color	Result
Gold	Winner
Silver	2nd-place finish
Bronze	3rd-place finish
Green	Top 5 finish
Light Blue	Top 10 finish
Dark Blue	Other flagged position
Purple	Did not finish
Red	Did not qualify (DNQ)
Brown	Withdrew (Wth)
Black	Disqualified (DSQ)
White	Did Not Start (DNS)
White	Race abandoned (C)
Blank	Did not participate

=== Points standings ===
Points	1°	2°	3°	4°	5°	6°	7°	8°	9°	10°	11°	12°	13°	14°	15°
Race 1	22	20	18	16	15	14	13	12	11	10	9	8	7	6	5
Race 2	18	16	14	12	11	10	9	8	7	6	5	4	3	2	1

== See also ==
- 2020 Stock Car Brasil Championship
- Stock Light
- Brasileiro de Marcas
- Moto 1000 GP
- SuperBike Brasil
- Fórmula Truck
