= 2015 Formula 3 Brasil season =

The 2015 Fórmula 3 Brasil season is the ninth Fórmula 3 Brasil season and the second since 1995, replacing the Formula 3 Sudamericana series as the highest-profile single-seater championship on the continent. In 2015 F3 Brasil will be integrated at Stock Car Brasil event, exception for the first and last round.

== Drivers and teams ==
- All cars were powered by Berta engines, and ran on Pirelli tyres.

Team	No.	Driver	Chassis	Rounds
Class A
(Brazil) Césario F3	1	(Brazil) Pedro Piquet	Dallara F309	All
(Brazil) Césario F3	34	(Brazil) Matheus Iorio	Dallara F309	All
(Brazil) RR Racing	3	(Canada) Ryan Verra	Dallara F309	2–3, 5, 7–8
(Brazil) RR Racing	7	(United States) Nicholas Silva	Dallara F309	1
(Brazil) RR Racing	23	(Brazil) Victor Franzoni	Dallara F309	8
(Brazil) RR Racing	25	(Brazil) Giuliano Raucci	Dallara F309	1
(United Kingdom) Hitech Racing	9	(Brazil) Christian Hahn	Dallara F309	All
(United Kingdom) Hitech Racing	23	(Brazil) Gustavo Bandeira	Dallara F309	2–3
(United Kingdom) Hitech Racing	84	(Brazil) Fernando Croce	Dallara F309	All
(Brazil) Prop Car Racing	13	(Brazil) Rodrigo Baptista	Dallara F309	All
(Brazil) Prop Car Racing	31	(Argentina) Nicolas Dapero	Dallara F309	3–8
(Brazil) Fortunato F3 Racing	28	(Brazil) Artur Fortunato	Dallara F309	All
(Brazil) CF3	54	(Brazil) Carlos Cunha Filho	Dallara F309	All
(Brazil) Kemba Racing	91	(Brazil) Leonardo de Souza	Dallara F309	1–5, 7
Class B
(Brazil) Prop Car Racing	27	(Brazil) Matheus Muniz	Dallara F301	All
(Brazil) Prop Car Racing	55	(Brazil) Igor Fraga	Dallara F301	All
(Brazil) EMB Racing	33	(Brazil) Dario Lintz	Dallara F301	1
(Brazil) RR Racing	35	(Brazil) Felipe Ortiz	Dallara F301	1–4
(Brazil) RR Racing	43	(Brazil) Pedro Cardoso	Dallara F301	4
(Brazil) RR Racing	46	(Brazil) Andreas Visnardi	Dallara F301	1–4
(Brazil) RR Racing	48	(Brazil) Renan Pietrowski	Dallara F301	7
(Brazil) Césario F3	43	(Brazil) Pedro Cardoso	Dallara F301	1–3
(Brazil) Césario F3	77	(Brazil) Guilherme Samaia	Dallara F301	All

== Race calendar and results ==
A calendar for the 2015 season was released on 19 December 2014, with the category supporting Stock Car Brasil for the majority of the season. The only exceptions to this was the first race at Curitiba, which was held at the Stock Car collective test and the last round, which will be held as a stand-alone event. All races were held in Brazil.

Round		Circuit	Date	Pole position	Fastest lap	Winning driver	Winning team	Class B winner
1	R1	Autódromo Internacional de Curitiba	7 February	(Brazil) Pedro Piquet	(Brazil) Pedro Piquet	(Brazil) Pedro Piquet	(Brazil) Césario F3	(Brazil) Guilherme Samaia
1	R2	Autódromo Internacional de Curitiba	8 February		(Brazil) Pedro Piquet	(Brazil) Matheus Iorio	(Brazil) Césario F3	No finishers
2	R1	Velopark, Nova Santa Rita	25 April	(Brazil) Pedro Piquet	(Brazil) Matheus Iorio	(Brazil) Rodrigo Baptista	(Brazil) Prop Car Racing	(Brazil) Guilherme Samaia
2	R2	Velopark, Nova Santa Rita	26 April		(Brazil) Pedro Piquet	(Brazil) Pedro Piquet	(Brazil) Césario F3	(Brazil) Guilherme Samaia
3	R1	Autódromo Internacional de Santa Cruz do Sul	27 June	(Brazil) Pedro Piquet	(Brazil) Pedro Piquet	(Brazil) Pedro Piquet	(Brazil) Césario F3	(Brazil) Pedro Cardoso
3	R2	Autódromo Internacional de Santa Cruz do Sul	28 June		(Brazil) Pedro Piquet	(Brazil) Pedro Piquet	(Brazil) Césario F3	(Brazil) Guilherme Samaia
4	R1	Autódromo Internacional de Curitiba	1 August	(Brazil) Pedro Piquet	(Brazil) Pedro Piquet	(Brazil) Pedro Piquet	(Brazil) Césario F3	(Brazil) Igor Fraga
4	R2	Autódromo Internacional de Curitiba	2 August		(Brazil) Pedro Piquet	(Brazil) Pedro Piquet	(Brazil) Césario F3	(Brazil) Guilherme Samaia
5	R1	Autódromo Internacional de Cascavel	29 August	(Brazil) Pedro Piquet	(Argentina) Nicolas Dapero	(Brazil) Pedro Piquet	(Brazil) Césario F3	(Brazil) Igor Fraga
5	R2	Autódromo Internacional de Cascavel	30 August		(Brazil) Pedro Piquet	(Brazil) Pedro Piquet	(Brazil) Césario F3	(Brazil) Guilherme Samaia
6	R1	Autódromo Internacional Orlando Moura	12 September	(Brazil) Pedro Piquet	(Brazil) Pedro Piquet	(Brazil) Pedro Piquet	(Brazil) Césario F3	(Brazil) Igor Fraga
6	R2	Autódromo Internacional Orlando Moura	13 September		(Brazil) Pedro Piquet	(Brazil) Pedro Piquet	(Brazil) Césario F3	(Brazil) Guilherme Samaia
7	R1	Autódromo Internacional de Curitiba	17 October	(Brazil) Pedro Piquet	(Brazil) Pedro Piquet	(Brazil) Pedro Piquet	(Brazil) Césario F3	(Brazil) Matheus Muniz
7	R2	Autódromo Internacional de Curitiba	18 October		(Brazil) Pedro Piquet	(Brazil) Pedro Piquet	(Brazil) Césario F3	(Brazil) Matheus Muniz
8	R1	Autódromo José Carlos Pace	12 December	(Brazil) Pedro Piquet	(Brazil) Pedro Piquet	(Brazil) Pedro Piquet	(Brazil) Césario F3	(Brazil) Guilherme Samaia
8	R2	Autódromo José Carlos Pace	13 December		(Brazil) Pedro Piquet	(Brazil) Pedro Piquet	(Brazil) Césario F3	(Brazil) Igor Fraga

== Championship standings ==
Scoring system

Position	**1st**	**2nd**	**3rd**	**4th**	**5th**	**6th**	**7th**	**8th**
Points	15	12	9	7	5	3	2	1

=== Drivers' Championships ===
Pos	Driver	CUR1		VEL		SCS		CUR2		CAS		CGR		CUR3		INT		Pts
Class A
1	(Brazil) Pedro Piquet	**1**	6	**Ret**	1	**1**	1	**1**	1	**1**	1	**1**	1	**1**	1	**1**	1	213
2	(Brazil) Matheus Iorio	3	1	2	2	DSQ	4	5	2	4	Ret	5	5	2	Ret	5	2	118
3	(Brazil) Carlos Cunha Filho	10	Ret	4	3	3	2	4	5	11	3	2	4	4	5	2	DSQ	105
4	(Brazil) Rodrigo Baptista	2	3	1	7	Ret	Ret	Ret	4	4	5	Ret	2	6	3	4	3	102
5	(Brazil) Artur Fortunato	Ret	2	3	Ret	4	7	3	3	8	4	4	6	3	2	Ret	4	98
6	(Argentina) Nicolas Dapero					Ret	3	2	10	3	2	Ret	3	5	4	Ret	Ret	66
7	(Brazil) Christian Hahn	Ret	4	Ret	6	9	Ret	Ret	Ret	2	8	3	8	7	7	6	9	54
8	(Brazil) Fernando Croce	7	Ret	9	10	7	Ret	Ret	12	Ret	7	Ret	Ret	9	9	Ret	Ret	22
9	(Brazil) Leonardo de Souza	6	Ret	7	13	Ret	10	Ret	Ret	7	Ret			Ret	Ret			15
10	(Canada) Ryan Verra			Ret	9	6	11			9	Ret			10	Ret	Ret	8	15
11	(Brazil) Gustavo Bandeira			5	12	Ret	5											11
12	(Brazil) Giuliano Raucci	8	5															8
13	(Brazil) Victor Franzoni															Ret	7	5
14	(United States) Nicholas Silva	9	Ret															2
Class B
1	(Brazil) Guilherme Samaia	4	Ret	6	4	8	6	8	6	Ret	6	7	7	**12**	8	**3**	Ret	171
2	(Brazil) Matheus Muniz	**5**	Ret	10	14	5	9	**9**	Ret	10	9	8	9	8	6	Ret	6	141
3	(Brazil) Igor Fraga	Ret	Ret	Ret	8	Ret	8	6	11	**6**	Ret	**6**	Ret	11	11	8	5	117
4	(Brazil) Pedro Cardoso	11	Ret	**Ret**	5	**2**	Ret	Ret	7									48
5	(Brazil) Andreas Visnardi	Ret	Ret	8	11	10	Ret	7	9									45
6	(Brazil) Renan Pietrowski													13	10			16
7	(Brazil) Felipe Ortiz	Ret	Ret	Ret	Ret	Ret	Ret	Ret	8									9
	(Brazil) Dario Lintz	Ret	Ret															0
Pos	Driver	CUR1		VEL		SCS		CUR2		CAS		CGR		CUR3		INT		Pts

Colour	Result
Gold	Winner
Silver	Second place
Bronze	Third place
Green	Points classification
Blue	Non-points classification
Blue	Non-classified finish (NC)
Purple	Retired, not classified (Ret)
Red	Did not qualify (DNQ)
Red	Did not pre-qualify (DNPQ)
Black	Disqualified (DSQ)
White	Did not start (DNS)
White	Withdrew (WD)
White	Race cancelled (C)
Blank	Did not practice (DNP)
Blank	Did not arrive (DNA)
Blank	Excluded (EX)

**Bold** – Pole
Italics – Fastest Lap
