= 2018 Pro Mazda Championship =

The 2018 Pro Mazda Championship was the 20th season in series history. It was the final season using the Pro Mazda name, as the series was re-branded as "Indy Pro 2000" for the 2019 season. A 16-race schedule was announced on 17 October 2017. This was the first season to use the new Tatuus PM-18 chassis and Mazda MZR piston engine. All prior engine packages for the series included a Mazda Wankel engine.

== Drivers and teams ==
Team	No.	Drivers	Rounds
BN Racing	78	(United States) Kris Wright	1–6, 10–13
BN Racing	78	(United Kingdom) Toby Sowery	8–9
BN Racing	79	(United States) David Malukas	All
BN Racing	83	(United States) Charles Finelli	1–14
Cape Motorsports	3	(United States) Oliver Askew	All
Cape Motorsports	8	(Russia) Nikita Lastochkin	All
DEForce Racing	11	(United States) Kory Enders	3–4
DEForce Racing	12	(United Kingdom) James Raven	1–2
DEForce Racing	12	(Mexico) Moisés de la Vara	12–16
Exclusive Autosport	90	(Canada) Parker Thompson	All
Exclusive Autosport	91	(Canada) Antonio Serravalle	1–11
Juncos Racing	1	(Brazil) Carlos Cunha	1–13
Juncos Racing	2	(Netherlands) Rinus VeeKay	All
Juncos Racing	9	(United States) Robert Megennis	All
RP Motorsport	10	(United Kingdom) Harrison Scott	1–11, 14
RP Motorsport	10	(Brazil) Felipe Drugovich	12–13
RP Motorsport	27	(Italy) Lodovico Laurini	1–7
RP Motorsport	27	(Mexico) Raúl Guzmán	8–11
RP Motorsport	27	(Colombia) Mathias Soler-Obel	12–14
Team Pelfrey	80	(Brazil) Rafael Martins	1–4
Team Pelfrey	81	(Mexico) Andrés Gutiérrez	1–6, 8–13
Team Pelfrey	82	(United States) Sting Ray Robb	All

== Schedule ==
Rd.	Date	Race name	Track	Location
1	March 10	(United States) Honda Grand Prix of St. Petersburg	Streets of St. Petersburg	St. Petersburg, Florida
2	March 11	(United States) Honda Grand Prix of St. Petersburg	Streets of St. Petersburg	St. Petersburg, Florida
3	April 21	(United States) Indy Grand Prix of Alabama	Barber Motorsports Park	Birmingham, Alabama
4	April 22	(United States) Indy Grand Prix of Alabama	Barber Motorsports Park	Birmingham, Alabama
5	May 11	(United States) Grand Prix of Indianapolis	Indianapolis Motor Speedway road course	Speedway, Indiana
6	May 12	(United States) Grand Prix of Indianapolis	Indianapolis Motor Speedway road course	Speedway, Indiana
7	May 25	(United States) Dave Steele Carb Night Classic	Lucas Oil Raceway	Clermont, Indiana
8	June 23	(United States) Grand Prix of Road America	Road America	Elkhart Lake, Wisconsin
9	June 24	(United States) Grand Prix of Road America	Road America	Elkhart Lake, Wisconsin
10	July 14	(Canada) Grand Prix of Toronto	Exhibition Place	Toronto, Ontario, Canada
11	July 15	(Canada) Grand Prix of Toronto	Exhibition Place	Toronto, Ontario, Canada
12	July 28	(United States) Grand Prix of Mid-Ohio	Mid-Ohio Sports Car Course	Lexington, Ohio
13	July 29	(United States) Grand Prix of Mid-Ohio	Mid-Ohio Sports Car Course	Lexington, Ohio
14	August 25	(United States) St Louis Pro Mazda Oval Challenge	Gateway Motorsports Park	Madison, Illinois
15	September 1	(United States) Grand Prix of Portland	Portland International Raceway	Portland, Oregon
16	September 2	(United States) Grand Prix of Portland	Portland International Raceway	Portland, Oregon

== Race results ==
Round	Race	Pole position	Fastest lap	Most laps led	Race Winner	
Round	Race	Pole position	Fastest lap	Most laps led	Driver	Team
1	St. Petersburg 1	(United States) Oliver Askew	(United States) Sting Ray Robb	(Canada) Parker Thompson	(Netherlands) Rinus VeeKay	Juncos Racing
2	St. Petersburg 2	(Netherlands) Rinus VeeKay	(Brazil) Carlos Cunha	(Netherlands) Rinus VeeKay	(Netherlands) Rinus VeeKay	Juncos Racing
3	Birmingham 1	(Canada) Parker Thompson	(Canada) Parker Thompson	(Canada) Parker Thompson	(Canada) Parker Thompson	Exclusive Autosport
4	Birmingham 2	(Canada) Parker Thompson	(United States) David Malukas	(United Kingdom) Harrison Scott	(United Kingdom) Harrison Scott	RP Motorsport
5	Indianapolis GP 1	(United States) Oliver Askew	(United States) David Malukas	(Netherlands) Rinus VeeKay	(United Kingdom) Harrison Scott	RP Motorsport
6	Indianapolis GP 2	(United States) Oliver Askew	(Canada) Parker Thompson	(Brazil) Carlos Cunha	(Canada) Parker Thompson	Exclusive Autosport
7	Indianapolis	(Canada) Parker Thompson	(Canada) Parker Thompson	(Canada) Parker Thompson	(Canada) Parker Thompson	Exclusive Autosport
8	Road America 1	(United States) David Malukas	(United Kingdom) Toby Sowery	(United States) David Malukas	(United States) David Malukas	BN Racing
9	Road America 2	(United States) David Malukas	(Canada) Parker Thompson	(United States) David Malukas	(United States) David Malukas	BN Racing
10	Toronto 1	(Netherlands) Rinus VeeKay	(Netherlands) Rinus VeeKay	(Netherlands) Rinus VeeKay	(Netherlands) Rinus VeeKay	Juncos Racing
11	Toronto 2	(Netherlands) Rinus VeeKay	(United States) Oliver Askew	(Netherlands) Rinus VeeKay	(Netherlands) Rinus VeeKay	Juncos Racing
12	Mid-Ohio 1	(Netherlands) Rinus VeeKay	(Netherlands) Rinus VeeKay	(Netherlands) Rinus VeeKay	(Netherlands) Rinus VeeKay	Juncos Racing
13	Mid-Ohio 2	(United States) David Malukas	(United States) Robert Megennis	(Netherlands) Rinus VeeKay	(Netherlands) Rinus VeeKay	Juncos Racing
14	Gateway	(United Kingdom) Harrison Scott	(Canada) Parker Thompson	(Netherlands) Rinus VeeKay	(Netherlands) Rinus VeeKay	Juncos Racing
15	Portland 1	(Netherlands) Rinus VeeKay	(Netherlands) Rinus VeeKay	(United States) Oliver Askew	(United States) Oliver Askew	Cape Motorsports
16	Portland 2	(Netherlands) Rinus VeeKay	(United States) Oliver Askew	(United States) David Malukas	(United States) David Malukas	BN Racing

== Championship standings ==
=== Drivers' Championship ===
Scoring system

Position	**1st**	**2nd**	**3rd**	**4th**	**5th**	**6th**	**7th**	**8th**	**9th**	**10th**	**11th**	**12th**	**13th**	**14th**	**15th**	**16th**	**17th**	**18th**	**19th**	**20th**
Points	30	25	22	19	17	15	14	13	12	11	10	9	8	7	6	5	4	3	2	1
Points (O)	45	38	33	29	26	23	21	20	18	17	15	14	12	11	9	8	6	5	4	2

- The driver who qualifies on pole is awarded one additional point.
- One point is awarded to the driver who leads the most laps in a race.
- One point is awarded to the driver who sets the fastest lap during the race.

Pos	Driver	STP		BAR		IMS		LOR	ROA		TOR		MOH		GMP	POR		Points
1	(Netherlands) Rinus VeeKay	1	**1***	5	4	3*	14	4	5	5	**1***	**1***	**1***	1*	1*	**2**	**2**	412
2	(Canada) Parker Thompson	2*	5	**1***	**2**	5	1	**1***	4	4	8	8	5	6	6	3	5	345
3	(United States) Oliver Askew	**5**	6	7	12	**2**	**4**	6	9	8	4	2	6	3	5	1*	3	303
4	(United States) David Malukas	7	2	3	5	7	10	11	**1***	**1***	9	9	2	**13**	8	4	1*	293
5	(United States) Robert Megennis	3	16	14	6	14	8	3	8	10	12	3	3	2	2	5	7	269
6	(Brazil) Carlos Cunha	4	3	10	3	4	2*	2	6	6	2	10	4	12				252
7	(United States) Sting Ray Robb	6	4	9	10	13	3	5	11	9	11	7	9	4	9	6	6	231
8	(United Kingdom) Harrison Scott	9	12	2	1*	1	12	12	3	3	13	14			**3**			223
9	(Russia) Nikita Lastochkin	8	7	11	11	6	9	9	12	11	5	4	11	8	11	7	4	209
10	(United States) Charles Finelli	13	15	15	DNS	11	7	10	14	13	6	6	14	11	10			143
11	(Mexico) Andrés Gutiérrez	14	8	4	7	12	5		10	7	10	12	12	DNS				137
12	(United States) Kris Wright	12	14	13	14	10	6				7	5	10	10				110
13	(Canada) Antonio Serravalle	11	13	16	DNS	9	11	8	13	12	14	11						92
14	(Italy) Lodovico Laurini	10	11	12	9	8	13	7										84
15	(Mexico) Moisés de la Vara												13	9	4	8	8	75
16	(United Kingdom) Toby Sowery								2	2								51
17	(Mexico) Raúl Guzmán								7	14	3	13						51
18	(Colombia) Mathias Soler-Obel												8	7	7			48
19	(Brazil) Rafael Martins	16	9	6	8													45
20	(Brazil) Felipe Drugovich												7	5				31
21	(United States) Kory Enders			8	13													21
22	(United Kingdom) James Raven	15	10															17
Pos	Driver	STP		BAR		IMS		LOR	ROA		TOR		MOH		GMP	POR		Points

Color	Result
Gold	Winner
Silver	2nd place
Bronze	3rd place
Green	4th & 5th place
Light Blue	6th–10th place
Dark Blue	Finished (Outside Top 10)
Purple	Did not finish
Red	Did not qualify (DNQ)
Brown	Withdrawn (Wth)
Black	Disqualified (DSQ)
White	Did not start (DNS)
Blank	Did not participate

**In-line notation**
**Bold**	Pole position (1 point)
Italics	Ran fastest race lap (1 point)
*	Led most race laps (1 point); Not awarded if more than one driver leads most laps
Rookie

=== Teams' championship ===
Scoring system

Position	**1st**	**2nd**	**3rd**	**4th**	**5th**	**6th**	**7th**	**8th**	**9th**	**10th+**
Points	22	18	15	12	10	8	6	4	2	1

- Single car teams receive 3 bonus points as an equivalency to multi-car teams
- Only the best two results count for teams fielding more than two entries

Pos	Team	Points
1	Juncos Racing	477
2	Cape Motorsports	254
3	BN Racing	244
4	Exclusive Autosport	239
5	RP Motorsport	196
6	Team Pelfrey	167
7	Fatboy Racing	76
8	DEForce Racing	58

== See also ==
- 2018 IndyCar Series
- 2018 Indy Lights
- 2018 U.S. F2000 National Championship
