= Enzo Elias =

Brazilian racing driver

- Nationality: Brazil
- Born: February 8, 2002 (age 24) Brasília, Brazil

Stock Car Pro Series career
- Debut season: 2022
- Current team: Crown Racing
- Car number: 28
- Starts: 4
- Wins: 1
- Podiums: 1

Championship titles
- 2019 2021 2022: Porsche Carrera Cup 3.8; Porsche Carrera Cup Endurance; Porsche Carrera Cup 4.0

Enzo Weisheimer Elias (born 8 February 2002 in Brasília) is a Brazilian racing driver currently competing in Stock Car Brasil for Crown Racing. He is a two-time overall champion of the Porsche Cup Brasil and five-time champion across different classes.

== Career ==
=== Karting ===
Elias began racing at the age of eleven. His first titles were in 2015 and 2016, winning Top Kart Brasil, 15º Super Kart Brasil, 20º Super Kart Brasil, Brasiliense de Kart, and Copa Guará de Kart.

=== Porsche Carrera Cup Brasil ===
Elias was a finalist of the Porsche Carrera Cup Brasil Junior Program in 2018 and began racing in Porsche Carrera Cup 3.8, where he was the champion in 2019, becoming the youngest champion of a Porsche championship at the age of sixteen. He was runner up in Porsche Carrera Cup 4.0 the next year. In 2021, he was champion of the Endurance and Overall classes of the Carrera Cup, as well as representing Brazil at the Porsche Motorsport Junior Programme in Spain. Elias won the Overall class in the Porsche Carerra Cup in 2022. He won the Capacete de Ouro award and debuted in Stock Car Brasil in 2023.

== Results ==
=== Career summary ===
Season	Series	Team	Races	Wins	Poles	F/Laps	Podiums	Points	Position
2017	Formula 3 Brasil - Academy Class	Hitech Racing	16	2	0	0	10	132	3rd
2021	Porsche Carrera Cup Brasil	N/A	?	?	?	?	?	?	1st
2022	Porsche Carrera Cup Brasil	N/A	?	7	?	?	?	?	1st
2022	Stock Car Pro Series	Shell V-Power	1	1	0	0	1	0	NC†
2023	Stock Car Pro Series	Crown Racing	24	0	0	0	0	81	26th
2023	Le Mans Cup - LMP3	Murphy Prototypes	1	0	0	0	0	0	26th

† As he was a guest driver, Elias was ineligible for points.
