= Brazilian Formula Three Championship =

Former Single-Seater Racing Championship

- Category: Single-seaters
- Country: Brazil
- Inaugural season: 1989
- Folded: 2017
- Constructors: Dallara
- Engine suppliers: Berta
- Tyre suppliers: Pirelli
- Last Drivers' champion: (Brazil) Guilherme Samaia
- Last Makes' champion: Dallara-Berta
- Last Teams' champion: (Brazil) Césario F3
- Official website: Official website

Fórmula 3 Brasil was a Brazilian Formula Three racing competition, organised by the Vicar and CBA. It is a junior-level feeder formula that uses small single seater Formula Three chassis. The series was disputed from 1989 until 1995 and was revived in 2013, the series replacing Formula 3 Sudamericana in 2014. It was folded again 2017.

== Champions ==
| Season | Champion | Team Champion | Chassis/engine | Secondary Class Champion |
|---|---|---|---|---|
| 1989 | (Brazil) Christian Fittipaldi | (Brazil) Fittipaldi Competicion | Reynard-Alfa Romeo | |
| 1990 | (Brazil) Oswaldo Negri | (Brazil) Daccar | Ralt-Volkswagen | |
| 1991 | (Brazil) Marcos Gueiros | (Brazil) Césario Fórmula | Ralt-Mugen Honda | |
| 1992 | (Brazil) Marcos Gueiros | (Brazil) Césario Fórmula | Ralt-Mugen Honda | |
| 1993 | (Argentina) Fernando Croceri | (Brazil) Césario Fórmula | Ralt-Mugen Honda | |
| 1994 | (Brazil) Cristiano da Matta | (Brazil) Césario Fórmula | Dallara-Mugen Honda | |
| 1995 | (Brazil) Ricardo Zonta | (Brazil) Césario Fórmula | Dallara-Mugen Honda | |
| 1996 – 2013 | Not held | | | |
| 2014 | (Brazil) Pedro Piquet | (Brazil) Césario F3 | Dallara–Berta | (Brazil) Vitor Baptista |
| 2015 | (Brazil) Pedro Piquet | (Brazil) Césario F3 | Dallara–Berta | (Brazil) Guilherme Samaia |
| 2016 | (Brazil) Matheus Iorio | (Brazil) Césario F3 | Dallara–Berta | (Brazil) Pedro Caland |
| 2017 | (Brazil) Guilherme Samaia | (Brazil) Césario F3 | Dallara–Berta | (Brazil) Igor Fraga |

== See also ==
- Formula 3 Sudamericana
- Formula 3 Brazil Open
