= Autódromo Internacional de Cascavel =

Automobile racing complex in Brazil

Autódromo Internacional Zilmar Beux de Cascavel
- Full Circuit (1970–present) (Note: The start-finish line was changed in 2012, however the layout configuration has not been changed yet, the start-finish line on the map actually corresponds to the start-finish line before 2012.)
- Location: Cascavel, Paraná, Brazil
- Coordinates: 24°58′52.1″S 53°22′54.9″W
- Capacity: 75,000
- Opened: 7 September 1970; 55 years ago
- Architect: Zilmar Beux
- Former names: Autódromo Internacional de Cascavel (1970–2012)
- Major events: Current: TCR South America (2023–2024, 2026); Stock Car Pro Series (1979–1981, 1983–1993, 1995–1997, 2000, 2012–2021, 2023–present); NASCAR Brasil Series (2013–2021, 2023–present); Copa Truck (2018–2021, 2023–present); Fórmula Truck (1999–2004, 2006–2007, 2012–2016, 2022–present); Former: Porsche Cup Brasil (2015); Fórmula Academy Sudamericana (2015, 2019); Formula 3 Brasil (2015–2016); Campeonato Brasiliero de GT (2012); F3 Sudamericana (1987–1992, 1995–1996, 1998–2003, 2013); SASTC (1998–1999)

Full Circuit (1970–present)
- Length: 3.058 km (1.900 mi)
- Turns: 7
- Race lap record: 0:55.772 ( (Brazil) Matheus Iorio, Dallara F309, 2016, F3)

The Autódromo Internacional Zilmar Beux de Cascavel, commonly referred to as Autódromo de Cascavel, (Note: Portuguese pronunciation: [kas.kɐˈvɛw]) is an automobile racing complex located off Highway BR-277 in the city of Cascavel, Paraná, Brazil. The paved track is 3.058 km (1.900 mi) long. Opened in 1970, it hosts events for Stock Car Pro Series, NASCAR Brasil Series, Copa Truck and Fórmula Truck.

== History ==
The first races were carried out by automobiles on city streets in the 1960s, by amateurs and locals, which led to the building of a permanent location for motorsport events. In 1973 the Automóvel Clube de Cascavel circuit opened, being the third track with asphalt in the country.

The track came to host main competitions at national level. It was at the circuit that the Fórmula Truck series began. The circuit is a regular host of the Stock Car Pro Series.

Over the years, little money has been invested in the complex, which eventually caused the withdrawal of the circuit off the official calendar of major competitions. However, the circuit continued hosting many motoring and motorcycling events, including many driver training programs for drivers who acted and act in various automotive categories in Brazil and abroad.

Until 2013, the circuit also hosted the Formula 3 Sudamericana. Along with that, it also hosted the Campeonato Brasiliero de GT in 2012.

== Events ==
Current

- March: TCR South America Touring Car Championship, Stock Car Pro Series, Turismo Nacional BR, TCR Brasil Touring Car Championship
- May: NASCAR Brasil Series, Copa Truck
- August: Moto 1000 GP
- September: Fórmula Truck
- October: Stock Car Pro Series, Gold Classic
- November: Cascavel de Ouro

Former

- Brasileiro de Marcas (2013, 2017–2018)
- Brazilian Superbike Championship (2012–2013, 2015, 2023–2025)
- Campeonato Brasileiro de GT (2012)
- Fórmula Academy Sudamericana (2015, 2019)
- Formula 3 Brasil (2015–2016)
- Formula 3 Sudamericana (1987–1992, 1995–1996, 1998–2003, 2013)
- Porsche Cup Brasil (2015)
- South American Super Touring Car Championship (1998–1999)
- Stock Light (2012–2017, 2019, 2023–2025)

== Lap records ==
As of May 2026, the fastest official lap records at the Autódromo Internacional Zilmar Beux de Cascavel are listed as:

Category	Time	Driver	Vehicle	Event
Full Circuit: 3.058 km (1.900 mi) (1970–present)
Formula Three	0:55.772	Matheus Iorio	Dallara F309	2016 Cascavel F3 Brasil round
GT3	1:00.331	Renan Guerra	Mercedes-Benz SLS AMG GT3	2012 Cascavel Campeonato Brasileiro de GT round
Stock Car Brasil	1:01.724	Max Wilson	Chevrolet Cruze Stock Car	2017 Cascavel Stock Car Brasil round
TCR Touring Car	1:05.143	Leonel Pernía	Honda Civic Type R TCR (FL5)	2026 Cascavel TCR South America round
Stock Light	1:05.231	Felipe Barrichello Bartz	Chevrolet Cruze JL-G12	2025 Cascavel Stock Light round
Porsche Carrera Cup	1:05.261	Felipe Giaffone	Porsche 911 (991 I) GT3 Cup	2015 Cascavel Porsche Cup Brasil round
Formula Renault 1.6	1:06.601	Pedro Cardoso	Signatech FR 1.6	2015 Cascavel F4 Sudamericana round
GT4	1:06.679	Alan Hellmeister	Aston Martin V8 Vantage GT4	2012 Cascavel Campeonato Brasileiro de GT round
NASCAR Brasil	1:09.341	Gabriel Casagrande	Chevrolet Camaro SS	2026 Cascavel NASCAR Brasil round
Super Touring	1:11.898	Roberto Giorgi	Chevrolet Vectra 16v	1999 Cascavel SASTC round
Turismo Nacional BR	1:14.206	Augusto Sangalli	Chevrolet New Onix	2025 1st Cascavel Turismo Nacional Brasil round
Truck racing	1:18.686	Wellington Cirino	Mercedes-Benz Truck	2020 1st Cascavel Copa Truck round
