= Autódromo Internacional de Santa Cruz do Sul =

Motorsports circuit in Rio Grande do Sul, Brazil

- Full Circuit (2005–present)
- Location: Santa Cruz do Sul, Rio Grande do Sul, Brazil
- Coordinates: 29°48′0″S 52°26′12″W
- Broke ground: 2004
- Opened: 12 June 2005; 21 years ago
- Major events: Current: Stock Car Pro Series (2005–2011, 2014–2019, 2021–2022, 2026); NASCAR Brasil Series (2014, 2022, 2026); Copa Truck (2019, 2022, 2026); Fórmula Truck (2009–2012, 2014–2016, 2023, 2025–present); Turismo Nacional BR (2022, 2026); Former: Top Race V6 (2011); Porsche Cup Brasil (2007); Fórmula 3 Brasil (2014–2017); F4 Sudamericana (2015); Campeonato Brasiliero de GT (2008, 2011–2012); F3 Sudamericana (2007–2008, 2011)
- Website: https://www.santacruz.rs.gov.br/municipio/autodromo

Full Circuit (2005–present)
- Length: 3.531 km (2.194 mi)
- Turns: 14
- Race lap record: 1:10.468 ( (Brazil) Pedro Piquet, Dallara F309, 2015, F3)

Autódromo Internacional de Santa Cruz do Sul is a 3.531 km (2.194 mi) motorsports circuit located in Santa Cruz do Sul, Rio Grande do Sul. It has been host to the Formula 3 Sudamericana, Fórmula Truck and Stock Car Brasil series. Inaugurated on 12 June 2005, the track has received entries from almost all major categories of Brazil. It also hosted the Brazilian Formula Three Championship.

== Lap records ==
As of August 2026, the fastest official lap records at the Autódromo Internacional de Santa Cruz do Sul are listed as:

Category	Time	Driver	Vehicle	Event
Full Circuit: 3.531 km (2.194 mi) (2005–present)
Formula Three	1:10.468	Pedro Piquet	Dallara F309	2015 Santa Cruz do Sul F3 Brasil round
Formula Renault 2.0	1:17.714	Felipe Lapenna	Tatuus FR2000	2005 Santa Cruz do Sul Formula Renault 2.0 Brazil round
GT3	1:18.672	Allam Khodair	Lamborghini Gallardo LP600 GT3	2011 Santa Cruz do Sul GT Brasil round
Stock Car Pro	1:18.976	Hélio Castroneves	Toyota Corolla Cross	2026 Santa Cruz do Sul Stock Car Pro round
Stock Series	1:22.738	Raphael Reis	Chevrolet Cruze JL-G12	2022 Santa Cruz do Sul Stock Series round
Formula Future Fiat	1:25.155	Vinicius Alvarenga	Signatech-Fiat Formula Futuro	2010 Santa Cruz do Sul Formula Futuro Fiat round
GT4	1:25.486	William Freire	Ginetta G50 GT4	2011 Santa Cruz do Sul GT Brasil round
Porsche Carrera Cup	1:25.512	Otavio Mesquita	Porsche 911 (997 I) GT3 Cup	2007 Santa Cruz do Sul Porsche Cup Brasil round
Formula Renault 1.6	1:25.693	Francisco Cammarota	Signatech FR 1.6	2015 Santa Cruz do Sul F4 Sudamericana round
Ferrari Challenge	1:26.002	Alan Hellmeister	Ferrari F430 Challenge	2011 Santa Cruz do Sul GT Brasil round
Top Race V6	1:26.003	Mariano Werner	Ford Mondeo	2011 Santa Cruz do Sul Top Race V6 round
NASCAR Brasil	1:29.572	Cacá Bueno	Chevrolet Camaro SS	2026 Santa Cruz do Sul NASCAR Brasil round
Turismo Nacional BR	1:34.686	Yassin Aboobakar	Chevrolet New Onix	2026 Santa Cruz do Sul Turismo Nacional Brasil round
Truck racing	1:42.457	Beto Monteiro	Iveco Truck	2014 Santa Cruz do Sul Fórmula Truck round
