= Autódromo Internacional de Curitiba =

Former racing circuit in Brazil

- Location: Av. Iraí, nº 16, Pinhais, PR, Brazil
- Coordinates: 25°26′41″S 49°11′49″W
- Broke ground: 1965
- Opened: 1967
- Closed: 12 January 2022; 4 years ago
- Major events: TCR South America (2021); Stock Car Brasil (1980–2018, 2020–2021); Copa Truck (2018, 2020–2021); GT Sprint Race (2012–2018, 2020–2021); Stock Car Corrida do Milhão (2017); Fórmula 3 Brasil (2014–2017); Fórmula Truck (1996, 1998–2003, 2005–2016); F3 Sudamericana (1989, 1992, 1996, 2002–2010, 2012–2013); Campeonato Sudamericano de GT (2007–2013); WTCC Race of Brazil (2006–2012); Auto GP (2012); TC2000 (2005–2006); World Series by Nissan (2002); Mil Milhas Brasil (1999); SASTC (1997–1998)
- Website: http://www.autodromodecuritiba.com.br/

Full Circuit (1988–2022)
- Length: 3.707 km (2.303 mi)
- Turns: 11
- Race lap record: 1:10.182 ( (Belgium) Bas Leinders, Dallara SN01, 2002, Formula Nissan)

Outer Circuit (1988–2022)
- Length: 2.600 km (1.616 mi)
- Turns: 5
- Race lap record: 0:50.371 ( (Brazil) Daniel Serra, Chevrolet Cruze Stock Car, 2021, Stock Car Pro)

Original Circuit (1967–1987)
- Length: 4.200 km (2.610 mi)
- Turns: 9

Autódromo Internacional de Curitiba (also known as Autódromo de Pinhais and Circuito Raul Boesel) was a motorsports circuit located in Pinhais, Brazil. It has been host to the World Touring Car Championship, TC2000, Fórmula Truck and Stock Car Brasil racing. Until 2013 the circuit has also been host of the South American Formula 3 Series, namely the Formula 3 Sudamericana. The circuit also formerly hosted the Brazilian Formula Three Championship.

== A1 Grand Prix series ==
The circuit was scheduled to host a round of the A1 Grand Prix series in February 2006. However, after the schedule was revised, the circuit was removed as a host venue for the series.

== Simulation / Video Games ==
Simulation / Video Game	Year	Configuration	
Simulation / Video Game	Year	Outer	Full
Automobilista 2	2020	Yes	Yes
Automobilista	2016	Yes	Yes
Game Stock Car Extreme	2013	Yes	Yes
Game Stock Car 2012	2012	Yes	Yes
Game Stock Car	2010	Yes	Yes
Race Pro	2009		Yes
Race 07	2007	Yes	Yes

== Ending of Activities ==
At the end of 2021, it was known the land of the circuit was sold. Since 2014, the Inepar group, the owner of Autodromo, entered in judicial recovery and the plan of recoveries at the time was to sell the circuit. This was postponed after a real estate crisis throughout Brazil and gave a new opportunity for the circuit. The new plan is a project to build residential and commercial towers. The launch of these buildings is planned for the second half of 2022.

On December 17, 2021 the part of "Curva da Vitória" started to be demolished, but for a legal reasons the work stopped with complaints about the historical heritage of circuit and its land.

== Lap records ==
The fastest official lap records at the Autódromo Internacional de Curitiba are listed as:

Category	Time	Driver	Vehicle	Event
Grand Prix Circuit (1988–2022): 3.707 km (2.303 mi)
Formula Nissan	1:10.182	Bas Leinders	Dallara SN01	2002 Curitiba World Series by Nissan round
Formula Three	1:11.137	Pedro Piquet	Dallara F309	2015 7th Curitiba F3 Brasil round
Auto GP	1:12.549	Pål Varhaug	Lola B05/52	2012 Curitiba Auto GP round
GT3	1:16.643	Daniel Serra	Ferrari 458 Italia GT3	2011 2nd Curitiba GT3 Brasil round
GT1	1:18.180	Fabien Giroix	McLaren F1 GTR	1996 2 Hours of Curitiba
Stock Car Brasil	1.18.882	Diego Nunes	Chevrolet Cruze Stock Car	2018 1st Curitiba Stock Car Brasil round
Formula Renault 2.0	1:19.194	Nelson Merlo	Tatuus FR2000	2005 Curitiba Formula Renault 2.0 Brazil round
Porsche Carrera Cup	1:19.784	Enzo Elias	Porsche 911 (991 II) GT3 Cup	2021 2nd Curitiba Porsche Carrera Cup Brasil round
Super 2000	1:22.890	Robert Huff	Chevrolet Cruze 1.6T	2011 FIA WTCC Race of Brazil
Formula Future Fiat	1:23.505	Victor Franzoni	Signatech-Fiat Formula Futuro	2011 Curitiba Formula Futuro Fiat round
TCR Touring Car	1:23.530	Rodrigo Baptista	Audi RS 3 LMS TCR	2021 Curitiba TCR South America round
GT4	1:23.656	Sergio Laganá	Aston Martin V8 Vantage GT4	2013 1st Curitiba Campeonato Sudamericano de GT round
Ferrari Challenge	1:23.933	Alan Hellmeister	Ferrari F430 Challenge	2011 1st Curitiba GT3 Brasil round
Stock Car Light	1:24.550	Felipe Baptista	Chevrolet Cruze JL-G12	2021 1st Curitiba Stock Car Light round
TC2000	1:26.682	Norberto Fontana	Toyota Corolla	2006 Curitiba TC2000 round
Super Touring	1:26.683	Juan Manuel Fangio II	Peugeot 406	1998 Curitiba SASTC round
Truck racing	1:41.453	Felipe Giaffone	Volkswagen Truck	2010 Curitiba Fórmula Truck round
Outer Circuit (1988–2022): 2.600 km (1.616 mi)
Stock Car Pro	0:50.371	Daniel Serra	Chevrolet Cruze Stock Car	2021 2nd Curitiba Stock Car Pro round
Stock Car Light	0:52.773	Felipe Baptista	Chevrolet Cruze JL-G12	2021 2nd Curitiba Stock Car Light round
