= Porsche Cup Brasil =

One make racing series

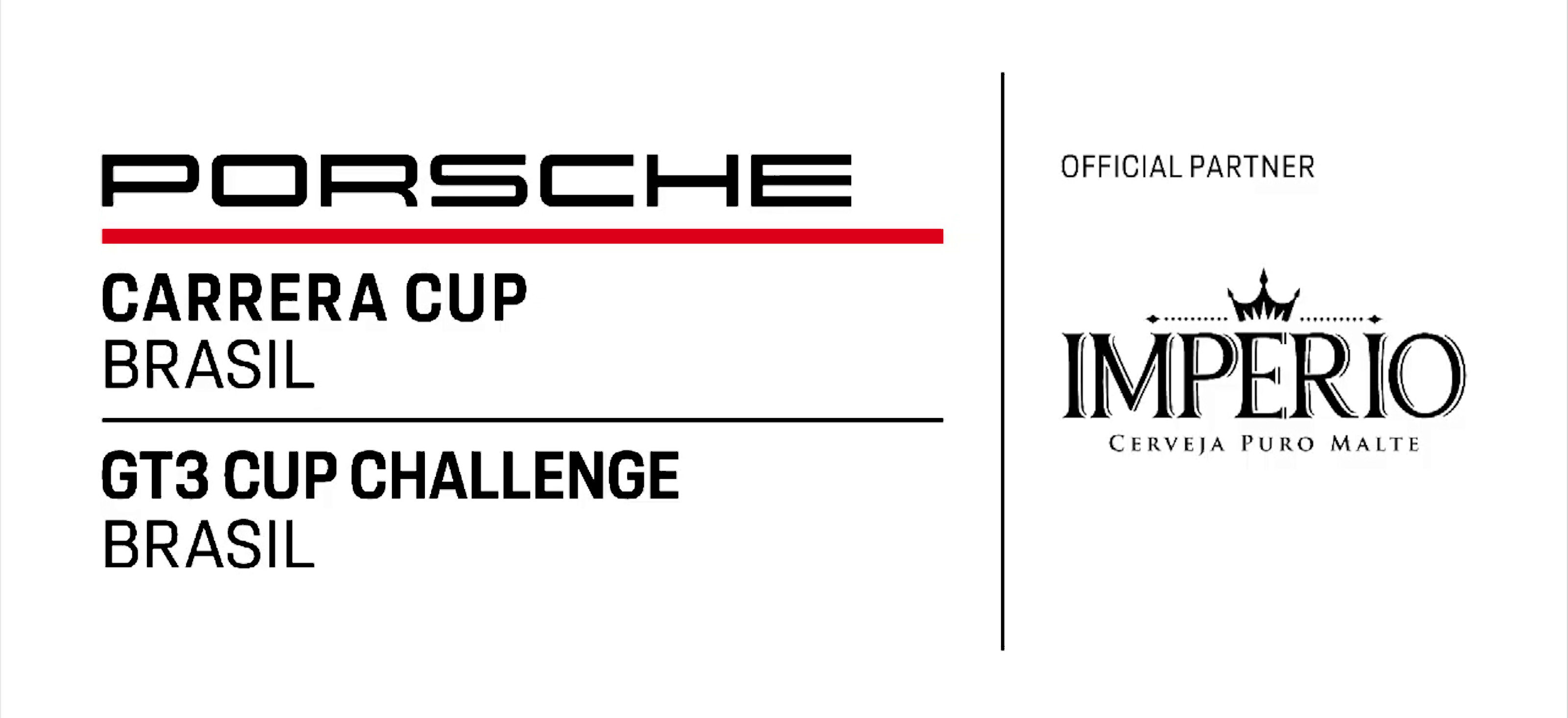
- Category: One-make racing by Porsche
- Country: Brazil
- Inaugural season: 2005
- Constructors: Porsche
- Tyre suppliers: Michelin
- Drivers' champion: Carrera Cup (Sprint): (Brazil) Marçal Müller; Carrera Sport (Sprint): (Brazil) Peter Ferter; Carrera Rookie (Sprint): (Brazil) Israel Salmen; Sprint Challenge: (Brazil) Miguel Mariotti; Sprint Challenge Sport: (Brazil) Célio Brasil; Sprint Challenge Rookie: (Brazil) Caio Chaves; Sprint Trophy: (Brazil) José Moura Neto; Sprint Trophy Sport: (Brazil) Neto Heil; Carrera Cup (Endurance): (Brazil) Werner Neugebauer (Brazil) Rubens Barrichello; Carrera Sport (Endurance): (Brazil) Rouman Ziemkiewicz (Brazil) Nelson Piquet Jr. Carrera Rookie (Endurance): (Brazil) Bruno Campos (Brazil) Nicolas Costa; Challenge (Endurance): (Brazil) Sadak Leite (Brazil) Fábio Carbone; Challenge Sport (Endurance): (Brazil) Alceu Feldmann Neto (Brazil) Gabriel Casagrande; Challenge Rookie (Endurance): (Brazil) Alceu Feldmann Neto (Brazil) Gabriel Casagrande; Carrera Cup (Overall): (Brazil) Marçal Müller; Challenge (Overall): (Brazil) Sadak Leite
- Official website: Porsche Cup Brasil

The Porsche Carrera Cup Brasil and Porsche Sprint Challenge Brasil are the first ever one-make championships of Porsche in the continent of South America. It was first contested in 2005 and follows the same formula basis used in the Porsche Supercup and Porsche Carrera Cup championships held around the world.

== The championship ==
The championship organization is supported by the motorsport division of Porsche AG together with their Brazilian representative, Stuttgart Sportcar, and is divided in two classes of competition:

- Carrera Cup, that uses the same cars of the European series; Porsche 911 GT3 Cup (Type 992) with 4.0 liters, flat-6 naturally aspirated engines that produce 503 bhp (375 kW) and 470 N·m.
- Sprint Challenge, that uses Porsche 911 GT3 Cup (Type 991.2) cars with a less-powerful engine.

== Champions ==
=== Sprint Championship ===
Season	Champion		
Season	Cup (2009–2017) Carrera Cup (2018–present)	Light (2009–2010) GT3 Cup Challenge (2011–2021) Sprint Challenge (2022–present)	Sprint Trophy (2024-present)
2005	(Brazil) Beto Posses	Not held	Not held
2006	(Brazil) Xandy Negrão	Not held	Not held
2007	(Brazil) Ricardo Baptista	Not held	Not held
2008	(Brazil) Miguel Paludo	Not held	Not held
2009	(Brazil) Miguel Paludo	(Brazil) André Posses	Not held
2010	(Brazil) Ricardo Rosset	(Brazil) André Posses	Not held
2011	(Brazil) Constantino Júnior	(Brazil) Sylvio de Barros	Not held
2012	(Brazil) Ricardo Baptista	(Brazil) Sylvio de Barros	Not held
2013	Cup: (Brazil) Ricardo Rosset; Cup Master: (Brazil) Maurizio Billi	Challenge: (Brazil) Daniel Schneider; Challenge Light: (Brazil) Tom Filho	Not held
2014	Cup: (Brazil) Constantino Júnior; Cup Sport: (Brazil) Eduardo Azevedo; Cup Master: (Brazil) Clemente Lunardi	Challenge: (Brazil) Fábio Alves; Challenge Sport: (Brazil) Raulino Kreis Jr.	Not held
2015	Cup: (Brazil) Ricardo Rosset; Cup Sport: (Brazil) Daniel Schneider; Cup Master: (Brazil) Maurizio Billi	Challenge: (Brazil) João Paulo Mauro; Challenge Sport: (Brazil) Daniel Corrêa	Not held
2016	Cup: (Brazil) Lico Kaesemodel; Cup Sport: (Brazil) Carlos Ambrósio; Cup Master: (Brazil) Maurizio Billi	Challenge: (Brazil) Cristiano Piquet; Challenge Sport: (Brazil) Eloi Khuri	Not held
2017	Cup: (Brazil) Rodrigo Baptista; Cup Sport: (Brazil) Marcel Visconde; Cup Master: (Brazil) Maurizio Billi	Challenge: (Brazil) Marçal Muller; Challenge Sport: (Brazil) Pedro Costa	Not held
2018	Carrera 4.0: (Brazil) Werner Neugebauer; Carrera 3.8: (Brazil) Vitor Baptista; Carrera 3.8 Sport: (Brazil) Fernando Fortes	GT3 4.0: (Brazil) Sylvio de Barros; GT3 3.8: (Brazil) Francisco Horta	Not held
2019	Carrera 4.0: (Brazil) Marçal Müller; Carrera 3.8: (Brazil) Enzo Elias	GT3 4.0: (Brazil) Rodrigo Mello; GT3 3.8: (Brazil) Fran Lara	Not held
2020	Carrera Cup: (Brazil) Miguel Paludo; Carrera Sport: (Brazil) Rodrigo Mello	GT3 Cup: (Brazil) Nelson Marcondes; GT3 Sport: (Brazil) Nelson Marcondes	Not held
2021	Carrera Cup: (Brazil) Miguel Paludo; Carrera Sport: (Brazil) Renan Pizii; Carrera Trophy: (Brazil) Nelson Marcondes	GT3 Cup: (Brazil) Lucas Salles; GT3 Sport: (Brazil) Ricardo Fontanari; GT3 Trophy: (Brazil) Edu Guedes	Not held
2022	Carrera Cup: (Brazil) Enzo Elias; Carrera Sport: (Brazil) Franco Giaffone; Carrera Rookie: (Brazil) Lineu Pires	Sprint Challenge: (Brazil) Raijan Mascarrello; Sprint Challenge Sport: (Brazil) Guilherme Bottura; Sprint Challenge Rookie: (Brazil) Gustavo Zanon	Not held
2023	Carrera Cup: (Brazil) Nicolas Costa; Carrera Sport: (Brazil) Lucas Salles; Carrera Rookie: (Brazil) Edu Guedes	Sprint Challenge: (Brazil) Antonella Bassani; Sprint Challenge Sport: (Brazil) Antonio Junqueira; Sprint Challenge Rookie: (Brazil) Célio Brasil	Not held
2024	Carrera Cup: (Brazil) Marçal Müller; Carrera Sport: (Brazil) Peter Ferter; Carrera Rookie: (Brazil) Israel Salmen	Sprint Challenge: (Brazil) Miguel Mariotti; Sprint Challenge Sport: (Brazil) Célio Brasil; Sprint Challenge Rookie: (Brazil) Caio Chaves	Sprint Trophy: (Brazil) José Moura Neto; Sprint Trophy Sport: (Brazil) Neto Heil
2025	Carrera Cup: (Brazil) Miguel Paludo; Carrera Sport: (Brazil) Marcos Regadas; Carrera Rookie: (Brazil) Silvio Morestoni	Sprint Challenge: (Brazil) Caio Chaves; Sprint Challenge Sport: (Brazil) Lucas Locatelli; Sprint Challenge Rookie: (Brazil) Daniel Neumann	Sprint Trophy: (Brazil) Neto Carloni; Sprint Trophy Sport: (Brazil) Gabriel Guper

=== Endurance Challenge ===
Season	Class	
Season	Cup (2016–2017) 4.0 (2018–2019) Carrera Cup (2020–present)	Challenge (2016–2017) 3.8 (2018–2019) GT3 Cup (2020–2021) Challenge (2022–present)
2016	(Brazil) Alan Hellmeister	(Brazil) Rodrigo Mello (Brazil) Tom Filho
2017	(Brazil) Miguel Paludo	(Brazil) Alan Hellmeister (Brazil) Luca Seripieri
2018	4.0: (Brazil) Lico Kaesemodel (Brazil) Ricardo Zonta; 4.0 Sport: (Brazil) Luca Seripieri	3.8: (Brazil) Francisco Horta (Brazil) William Freire; 3.8 Sport: (Brazil) Maurizio Billi (Brazil) Marco Billi
2019	Carrera 4.0: (Brazil) Alan Hellmeister (Brazil) Luca Seripieri; Carrera 3.8: Leonardo Sanchez (Brazil) Átila Abreu	GT3 4.0: (Brazil) Alan Hellmeister (Brazil) Luca Seripieri; GT3 3.8: (Brazil) Leonardo Sanchez (Brazil) Átila Abreu; GT3 3.8 Sport: (Brazil) César Urnhani (Brazil) Nelson Marcondes
2020	Carrera Cup: (Brazil) Alceu Feldmann; Carrera Sport: (Brazil) Nelson Piquet Jr.	GT3 Cup: (Brazil) Francisco Horta (Brazil) William Freire; GT3 Sport: (Brazil) Leonardo Sanchez (Brazil) Átila Abreu; GT3 Trophy: (Brazil) Nelson Marcondes (Brazil) Nelson Monteiro
2021	Carrera Cup: (Brazil) Enzo Elias (Brazil) Jeff Giassi; Carrera Sport: (Brazil) Enzo Elias (Brazil) Jeff Giassi; Carrera Trophy: (Brazil) Enzo Elias (Brazil) Jeff Giassi	GT3 Cup: (Brazil) Nelson Monteiro (Brazil) Alan Hellmeister; GT3 Sport: (Brazil) Lineu Pires (Brazil) Beto Gresse; GT3 Trophy: (Brazil) Paulo Totaro
2022	Carrera Cup: (Brazil) Christian Hann (Brazil) Diego Nunes; Carrera Sport: (Brazil) Rouman Ziemvkiewicz (Brazil) Gabriel Casagrande; Carrera Rookie: (Brazil) Adroaldo Weisheimer (Brazil) Enzo Elias	Challenge: (Brazil) Nelson Marcondes (Brazil) Renan Guerra; Challenge Sport: (Brazil) Josimar Junior (Brazil) Sérgio Ramalho; Challenge Rookie: (Brazil) Sadak Leite (Brazil) Fábio Carbone
2023	Carrera Cup: (Brazil) Miguel Paludo (Brazil) Alan Hellmeister; Carrera Sport: (Brazil) Francisco Horta (Brazil) William Freire; Carrera Rookie: (Brazil) Edu Guedes (Brazil) Renan Pizii	Challenge: (Brazil) Sadak Leite (Brazil) Fábio Carbone; Challenge Sport: (Brazil) Sadak Leite (Brazil) Fábio Carbone; Challenge Rookie: (Brazil) Giuliano Bertucelli (Brazil) Pietro Rimbano
2024	Carrera Cup: (Brazil) Werner Neugebauer (Brazil) Rubens Barrichello; Carrera Sport: (Brazil) Rouman Ziemkiewicz (Brazil) Nelson Piquet Jr. Carrera Rookie: (Brazil) Bruno Campos (Brazil) Nicolas Costa	Challenge: (Brazil) Sadak Leite (Brazil) Fábio Carbone; Challenge Sport: (Brazil) Alceu Feldmann Neto (Brazil) Gabriel Casagrande; Challenge Rookie: (Brazil) Alceu Feldmann Neto (Brazil) Gabriel Casagrande
2025	Carrera Cup: (Brazil) Marçal Müller (Brazil) Felipe Fraga; Carrera Sport: (Brazil) Josimar Junior (Brazil) Sergio Ramalho; Carrera Rookie: (Brazil) Marco Pisani (Brazil) Renan Guerra	Challenge: (Brazil) José Moura Neto (Brazil) Mathues Iorio; Challenge Sport: (Brazil) José Moura Neto (Brazil) Mathues Iorio; Challenge Rookie: (Brazil) Neto; Carlos Ruiz (Brazil) Carlos Ruiz Jr.

=== Overall ===
Season	Class	
Season	Cup (2016–2017) Carrera Cup (2018–present)	GT3 Cup Challenge (2016–2021) Challenge (2022–present)
2016	(Brazil) Miguel Paludo	(Brazil) Eloi Khuri
2017	(Brazil) Miguel Paludo	(Brazil) Tom Filho
2018	(Brazil) Lico Kaesemodel	(Brazil) Francisco Horta
2019	(Brazil) Werner Neugebauer	(Brazil) Francisco Horta
2020	(Brazil) Pedro Aguiar	(Brazil) Zeca Feffer
2021	(Brazil) Enzo Elias	(Brazil) Nelson Monteiro
2022	(Brazil) Enzo Elias	(Brazil) Nelson Marcondes
2023	(Brazil) Miguel Paludo	(Brazil) Sadak Leite
2024	(Brazil) Marçal Müller	(Brazil) Sadak Leite
2025	(Brazil) Marçal Müller	(Brazil) José Moura Junior

== Circuits ==
- (São Paulo (state)) Interlagos Circuit (2005–present)
- (Paraná (state)) Autódromo Internacional de Curitiba (2006–2019, 2021)
- (Rio de Janeiro (state)) Autódromo Internacional Nelson Piquet (2007–2011)
- (Rio Grande do Sul) Autódromo Internacional de Santa Cruz do Sul (2007)
- (Rio Grande do Sul) Velopark (2010–2011)
- (Portugal) Circuito do Estoril (2011–2012, 2014, 2019, 2024–2025)
- (Buenos Aires) Autódromo Juan y Oscar Gálvez (2011, 2017)
- (Portugal) Algarve International Circuit (2012–2013, 2025–present)
- (São Paulo (state)) Autódromo Velo Città (2012–2019, 2021–present)
- (Catalonia) Circuit de Barcelona-Catalunya (2013)
- (Paraná (state)) Autódromo Internacional de Cascavel (2015)
- (Goiás) Autódromo Internacional Ayrton Senna (Goiânia) (2015–2018, 2020–2024)
- (Santiago del Estero Province) Autódromo Termas de Río Hondo (2016–2017, 2022–2024)
- (France) Circuit de la Sarthe (2026)
- (Federal District (Brazil)) Autódromo Internacional de Brasília (2026)
