= 2017 Porsche GT3 Cup Brasil =

13th season of Porsche Império GT3 Cup Challenge Brasil

The 2017 Porsche Império GT3 Cup Challenge Brasil is the first one-make Porsche racing championship in South America for 911 GT3 Cup cars and this was the thirteenth season. It started on March 18 with a Sprint race in Curitiba and finished on December 2 with an Endurance race in São Paulo. It was first held in 2005 and follows the same formula basis used in the Porsche Supercup and Porsche Carrera Cup championships held around the world.

== Drivers ==
All cars are overseen by the Dener Motorsport team. Cup, that uses the same cars of the European series; Porsche 911 GT3 Cup (Type 991) and Challenge, that uses Porsche 911 GT3 Cup (Type 997) cars with a less-powerful engine.

| No. | Driver | Rounds | Class |
|---|---|---|---|
| 00 | (Brazil) Constantino Jr. | 3 | C |
| 2 | (Brazil) Marcio Basso | 1–2 | C |
| 3 | (Brazil) Rodrigo Baptista | All | C |
| 4 | (Brazil) Beto Leite | 4–6 | C |
| 6 | (Brazil) Alceu Feldmann | 1 | C |
| 7 | (Brazil) Miguel Paludo | All | C |
| 7 | (Argentina) Dominique Teysseyre | 5 | CH |
| 8 | (Brazil) Werner Neugebauer | All | C |
| 8 | (Brazil) Marco Billi | All | CH |
| 9 | (Brazil) Guilherme Firguerôa | All | C |
| 10 | (Brazil) Adalberto Baptista | 1–4, 6 | C |
| 11 | (Brazil) Marcio Mauro | All | C |
| 12 | (Argentina) Dario Giustozzi | All | C |
| 12 | (Argentina) Pablo Delponte | 2, 4–6 | CH |
| 13 | (Brazil) Pedro Queirolo | All | C |
| 17 | (Brazil) Marcelo Parodi | 1, 3–6 | CH |
| 17 | (Brazil) Marcelo Stallone | 2 | C |
| 19 | (Brazil) Tom Filho | 2–5 | CH |
| 18 | (Brazil) Carlos Ambrósio | 1–2, 4, 6 | C |
| 20 | (Brazil) Marcel Visconde | 1–3, 5–6 | C |
| 21 | (Brazil) Eloi Khouri | All | CH |
| 21 | (Brazil) Eloi Khouri | 6 | C |
| 25 | (Brazil) Mauricio Salla | 1–5 | CH |
| 27 | (Brazil) Ricardo Baptista | All | C |
| 27 | (Brazil) Luís Fernando Elias | All | CH |
| 29 | (Brazil) Rodrigo Mello | All | CH |
| 30 | (Brazil) Cleber Faria | All | C |
| 31 | (Brazil) Lucas Seripieri | All | CH |
| 32 | (Brazil) Fernando Fortes | All | C |
| 33 | (Argentina) Pablo Otero | 4–5 | C |
| 34 | (Brazil) Maurizio Billi | All | C |
| 37 | (Brazil) Guilherme Reischl | 1–4 | CH' |
| 37 | (Brazil) Guilherme Reischl | 5–6 | C |
| 43 | (Sweden) Matte Karlsson | 6 | C |
| 44 | (Brazil) Paulo Pomelli | 3–4, 6 | C |
| 45 | (Brazil) Paulo Totaro | All | CH |
| 50 | (Brazil) Ramon Alcaraz | 1, 6 | CH |
| 50 | (Brazil) Ramon Alcaraz | 2, 4–5 | C |
| 51 | (Brazil) Cristiano Piquet | 1–2 | C |
| 53 | (Brazil) Ronaldo Kastropil | 1–2, 4, 6 | CH |
| 54 | (Brazil) Pedro Costa | All | CH |
| 55 | (Panama) Marcus Vario | All | CH |
| 56 | (Argentina) Fabian Taraborelli | 6 | CH |
| 63 | (Brazil) Lico Kaesemodel | All | C |
| 71 | (Brazil) Raulino Kreis Jr. | 6 | CH |
| 74 | (Paraguay) Odair Dos Santos | 2–3 | CH |
| 76 | (Brazil) Fernando Guerra | 4–6 | CH |
| 77 | (Brazil) Francisco Horta | All | CH |
| 78 | (Brazil) Lucas Peres | 5 | CH |
| 79 | (Brazil) Marcos Peres | All | CH |
| 80 | (Brazil) Rouman Ziemkiewicz | All | CH |
| 88 | (Brazil) Eduardo Rocha Azevedo | 2, 6 | C |
| 90 | (Brazil) João Paulo Mauro | All | C |
| 99 | (Brazil) Tom Vale | 1–3, 6 | C |
| 105 | (Brazil) Vanuê Faria | All | C |
| 155 | (Brazil) Rodrigo Mendes | 3 | CH |
| 544 | (Brazil) Marçal Müller | All | CH |

Endurance season entries
| No | Drivers | Rounds | Class |
|---|---|---|---|
| 0 | (Brazil) Cacá Bueno (Brazil) Sylvio de Barros | All | C |
| 3 | (Brazil) Rodrigo Baptista (Brazil) Sérgio Jimenez | 2–3 | C |
| 4 | (Brazil) Beto Leite (Brazil) Nonô Figueiredo (Brazil) Marcos Gomes | All; 3 | C |
| 5 | (Brazil) Marçal Muller (Brazil) Pedro Piquet (Brazil) Denis Navarro | All; 2; 3 | C |
| 7 | (Brazil) Miguel Paludo (Brazil) Norberto Gresse (United States) Justin Allgaier | All; 2; 3 | C |
| 8 | (Brazil) Werner Neugebauer (Brazil) Allam Khodair (Brazil) Renan Guerra | 1–2; 1; 2 | C |
| 9 | (Brazil) Júlio Campos (Brazil) Guilherme Figueiroa | 2 | C |
| 10 | (Brazil) Adalberto Baptista (Brazil) Bruno Baptista | 1, 3 | C |
| 13 | (Brazil) Pedro Queirolo (Brazil) Clemente Lunardi | All | C |
| 15 | (Chile) Carlos Ruiz (Chile) Mario Chomali | 3 | CH |
| 17 | (Brazil) Felipe Nasr (Brazil) Ingo Hoffmann (Brazil) Carlos Ambrosio | 1–2; 1; 2 | C |
| 18 | (Brazil) Felipe Nasr (Brazil) Carlos Ambrosio | 3 | CH |
| 19 | (Brazil) Tom Filho (Brazil) Rodrigo Mello (Brazil) João Gonçalves | All; 3 | CH |
| 20 | (Brazil) Marcel Visconde (Brazil) Fernando Fortes (Brazil) Werner Neugebauer | 1, 3; 3 | C |
| 21 | (Brazil) Eloi Khouri (Brazil) Marco Cozzi (Argentina) Esteban Guerrieri (Brazil) Diego Nunes | All; 1; 2; 3 | CH |
| 27 | (Brazil) Ricardo Baptista (Brazil) Valdeno Brito | All | C |
| 31 | (Brazil) Luca Seripieri (Brazil) Alan Hellmeister | All | CH |
| 33 | (Argentina) Dominique Teysseyre (Brazil) Giuliano Losacco (Brazil) Fábio Carbone | 1–2; 1; 2 | CH |
| 34 | (Brazil) Marco Billi (Brazil) Maurizio Billi | All | CH |
| 37 | (Brazil) Juliano Moro (Brazil) Guilherme Reischl (Brazil) Franscisco Horta (Brazil) Fabio Carbone | 2; 2–3; 3; 3 | C |
| 44 | (Panama) Marcus Vario (Brazil) Alberto Valério (Norway) Dennis Olsen | All; 2; 3 | C |
| 45 | (Brazil) Paulo Totaro (Brazil) Ronaldo Kastropil (Brazil) Laszlo Piquet | All; 3 | CH |
| 50 | (Brazil) Ramon Alcaraz (Brazil) Bia Figueiredo (Brazil) Noberto Gresse Filho | 1, 3; 3 | C |
| 52 | (Brazil) Beto Posses (Brazil) Marcelo Stallone (Brazil) Rodolfo Ometto | 3 | C |
| 53 | (Brazil) Rodolfo Toni (Brazil) Dennis Dirani (Brazil) Danilo Dirani | All; 3 | CH |
| 63 | (Brazil) Lico Kaesemodel (Brazil) Ricardo Zonta | All | C |
| 71 | (Brazil) Raulino Kreis Jr. (Brazil) Giulio Borlenghi (Brazil) Lucas Foresti | 3 | C |
| 77 | (Brazil) Daniel Schneider (Brazil) Sergio Jimenez (Brazil) Nelson Piquet Jr. (Austria) Thomas Preining | All; 1; 2; 3 | C |
| 79 | (Brazil) Marcus Peres (Brazil) Lucas Peres | All | CH |
| 80 | (Brazil) Nando Elias (Brazil) Rouman Ziemkiewicz | All | CH |
| 88 | (Brazil) Eduardo Rocha Azevedo (Brazil) Ricardo Maurício | All | C |
| 90 | (Brazil) João Paulo Mauro (Brazil) Felipe Fraga | All | C |
| 99 | (Brazil) Tom Valle (Brazil) Daniel Serra | 3 | C |
| 155 | (Brazil) Sérgio Maggi (Brazil) Ricardo Mendes (Brazil) Leandro Romera (Brazil) Alexandre Auler | 2; 3; 3; 3 | CH |

| Icon | Class |
|---|---|
| C | Cup |
| CH | Challenge |

== Race Calendar and Results ==
=== Races Cup Sprint ===
All races are scheduled to be held in Brazil and Argentina.

| Race | Circuit | Date | Pole position | Fastest lap | Winning driver |
|---|---|---|---|---|---|
| 1 | (Brazil) Autódromo Internacional de Curitiba, Curitiba | 18 March | (Brazil) Lico Kaesemodel | (Brazil) Rodrigo Baptista | (Brazil) Rodrigo Baptista |
| 2 | (Brazil) Autódromo Internacional de Curitiba, Curitiba | 18 March | | (Brazil) Marcel Visconde | (Brazil) Marcel Visconde |
| 3 | (Brazil) Autódromo José Carlos Pace, São Paulo | 6 May | (Brazil) Rodrigo Baptista | (Brazil) Rodrigo Baptista | (Brazil) Rodrigo Baptista |
| 4 | (Brazil) Autódromo José Carlos Pace, São Paulo | 6 May | (Brazil) Rodrigo Baptista | (Brazil) Ricardo Baptista | (Brazil) Rodrigo Baptista |
| 5 | (Brazil) Autódromo José Carlos Pace, São Paulo | 6 May | | (Brazil) Pedro Queirolo | (Brazil) Pedro Queirolo |
| 6 | (Brazil) Autódromo Velo Città, Mogi Guaçu | 3 June | (Brazil) Lico Kaesemodel | (Brazil) Rodrigo Baptista | (Brazil) Lico Kaesemodel |
| 7 | (Brazil) Autódromo Velo Città, Mogi Guaçu | 3 June | | (Brazil) Rodrigo Baptista | (Brazil) Miguel Paludo |
| 8 | (Argentina) Autódromo Juan y Óscar Gálvez, Buenos Aires | 5 August | (Brazil) Rodrigo Baptista | (Brazil) Rodrigo Baptista | (Brazil) Rodrigo Baptista |
| 9 | (Argentina) Autódromo Juan y Óscar Gálvez, Buenos Aires | 5 August | | (Brazil) Rodrigo Baptista | (Brazil) Rodrigo Baptista |
| 10 | (Argentina) Autódromo Termas de Río Hondo, Santiago del Estero | 26 August | (Brazil) Rodrigo Baptista | (Brazil) Rodrigo Baptista | (Brazil) Rodrigo Baptista |
| 11 | (Argentina) Autódromo Termas de Río Hondo, Santiago del Estero | 26 August | | (Brazil) Werner Neugebauer | (Brazil) Werner Neugebauer |
| 12 | (Brazil) Autódromo José Carlos Pace, São Paulo | 11 November | (Brazil) Rodrigo Baptista | (Brazil) Rodrigo Baptista | (Brazil) Rodrigo Baptista |
| 13 | (Brazil) Autódromo José Carlos Pace, São Paulo | 12 November | | (Brazil) Rodrigo Baptista | (Brazil) Miguel Paludo |

=== Races Challenge Sprint ===
All races are scheduled to be held in Brazil and Argentina.

| Race | Circuit, location | Date | Pole position | Fastest lap | Race winner |
|---|---|---|---|---|---|
| 1 | (Brazil) Autódromo Internacional de Curitiba | 18 March | (Brazil) Marçal Müller | (Brazil) Eloi Khouri | (Brazil) Marçal Müller |
| 2 | (Brazil) Autódromo José Carlos Pace | 6 May | (Brazil) Marçal Müller | (Brazil) Rodrigo Mello | (Brazil) Marçal Müller |
| 3 | (Brazil) Autódromo Vello Città | 3 June | (Brazil) Marçal Müller | (Brazil) Marçal Müller | (Brazil) Marçal Müller |
| 4 | (Argentina) Autódromo Juan y Óscar Gálvez, Buenos Aires | 5 August | (Brazil) Eloi Khouri | (Brazil) Marçal Müller | (Brazil) Eloi Khouri |
| 5 | (Argentina) Autódromo Juan y Óscar Gálvez, Buenos Aires | 5 August | (Brazil) Eloi Khouri | (Brazil) Eloi Khouri | (Brazil) Eloi Khouri |
| 6 | (Argentina) Autódromo Termas de Río Hondo, Santiago del Estero | 27 August | (Brazil) Marçal Müller | (Brazil) Marçal Müller | (Brazil) Marçal Müller |
| 7 | (Argentina) Autódromo Termas de Río Hondo, Santiago del Estero | 27 August | (Brazil) Marçal Müller | (Brazil) Eloi Khouri | (Brazil) Eloi Khouri |
| 8 | (Brazil) Autódromo José Carlos Pace | 12 November | (Brazil) Eloi Khouri | (Panama) Marcus Vario | (Panama) Marcus Vario |

=== Endurance Series ===
All races are scheduled to be held in Brazil.

| Round | Circuit, location | Date | Pole position | Cup winners | Challenge winners |
|---|---|---|---|---|---|
| 1 | (Brazil) Autódromo Velo Città, Mogi Guaçu 300 km Velo Citta | 16 September | (Brazil) Ricardo Baptista (Brazil) Valdeno Brito | (Brazil) Lico Kaesemodel (Brazil) Ricardo Zonta | (Brazil) Rodolfo Toni (Brazil) Dennis Dirani |
| 2 | (Brazil) Autódromo Internacional Ayrton Senna (Goiânia) 300 km Goiania | 7 October | (Brazil) Rodrigo Baptista (Brazil) Sergio Jimenez | (Brazil) Rodrigo Baptista (Brazil) Sergio Jimenez | (Brazil) Alan Hellmeister (Brazil) Luca Seripieri |
| 3 | (Brazil) Autódromo José Carlos Pace 500 km Interlagos | 2 December | (Brazil) Rodrigo Baptista (Brazil) Sergio Jimenez | (Brazil) João Paulo Mauro (Brazil) Felipe Fraga | (Brazil) Alan Hellmeister (Brazil) Luca Seripieri |

== Drivers' Championship ==
Points are awarded for each race at an event to the driver/s of a car that completed at least 70% of the race distance and was running at the completion of the race. The sprint races has the partially top 6 or 10 grid depending on a draw. Only the best 11 results in cup class counts toward the championship, while in challenge class only the best 5 results.

| Points format | Position | | | | | | | | | | | | | | |
| Points format | 1st | 2nd | 3rd | 4th | 5th | 6th | 7th | 8th | 9th | 10th | 11th | 12th | 13th | 14th | 15th |
|---|---|---|---|---|---|---|---|---|---|---|---|---|---|---|---|
| Cup feature race | 22 | 20 | 18 | 16 | 14 | 12 | 10 | 9 | 8 | 7 | 6 | 5 | 4 | 3 | 2 |
| Cup reserve grid race | 20 | 18 | 16 | 14 | 12 | 10 | 9 | 8 | 7 | 6 | 5 | 4 | 3 | 2 | 1 |
| Challenge race | 20 | 18 | 16 | 14 | 12 | 10 | 9 | 8 | 7 | 6 | 5 | 4 | 3 | 2 | 1 |

=== Cup ===
| Pos | Driver | CUR (Note: Half points were awarded for the second race as less than 50% of the race distance had been completed.) | | INT | | | VEC | | BUA | | TRH | | INT | | Pts |
|---|---|---|---|---|---|---|---|---|---|---|---|---|---|---|---|
| 1 | (Brazil) Rodrigo Baptista | 1 | 8 | **1** | **1** | 2 | 2 | Ret | **1** | **1** | **1** | Ret | **1** | 3 | 210 |
| 2 | (Brazil) Miguel Paludo | 2 | 7 | 5 | 3 | 3 | 3 | 1 | 7 | 3 | 2 | 3 | 4 | 1 | 194 (208,5) |
| 3 | (Brazil) Ricardo Baptista | 5 | 4 | 3 | 2 | 4 | 4 | 3 | 5 | Ret | 3 | 4 | 3 | 5 | 174 (181) |
| 4 | (Brazil) Lico Kaesemodel | **3** | 6 | 2 | 7 | 9 | **1** | 7 | 4 | 2 | 5 | 9 | 2 | 2 | 172 (184) |
| 5 | (Brazil) Werner Neugebauer | 6 | 3 | 7 | Ret | DNS | 9 | 2 | 3 | Ret | 4 | 1 | 7 | 12 | 124 |
| 6 | (Brazil) Pedro Queirolo | 14 | 14 | 4 | 6 | **1** | 5 | 6 | 8 | Ret | 8 | **5** | 9 | 6 | 123 (124) |
| 7 | (Brazil) João Paulo Mauro | 4 | 5 | Ret | 13 | 8 | 7 | **Ret** | 2 | 4 | Ret | Ret | 5 | 4 | 106 |
| 8 | (Brazil) Marcel Visconde | 8 | **1** | 9 | 8 | 7 | 8 | 4 | | | 7 | 6 | 11 | 10 | 100 |
| 9 | (Brazil) Fernando Fortes | 10 | 10 | 6 | 5 | 6 | 13 | 6 | 15 | Ret | 6 | 2 | Ret | Ret | 92 |
| 10 | (Brazil) Maurizio Billi | Ret | 15 | 10 | 10 | 10 | 8 | 8 | 10 | 8 | 13 | 10 | 10 | 11 | 72.5 (73) |
| 11 | (Brazil) Tom Valle | 7 | 2 | 12 | 18 | Ret | 11 | Ret | | | | | 8 | **8** | 47 |
| 12 | (Brazil) Vanuê Faria | 12 | 12 | 17 | 14 | 11 | 15 | 11 | 12 | 10 | 11 | 11 | 16 | Ret | 45 |
| 13 | (Brazil) Carlos Ambrósio | DSQ | DSQ | Ret | 9 | 14 | | | 6 | 5 | | | 14 | 9 | 44 |
| 14 | (Brazil) Márcio Mauro | Ret | 16 | 11 | 11 | 15 | 18 | 13 | 9 | 6 | Ret | DSQ | 12 | Ret | 39 |
| 15 | (Brazil) Adalberto Baptista | Ret | 17 | 16 | 4 | 5 | Ret | Ret | 16 | 11 | | | Ret | 13 | 36 |
| 16 | (Argentina) Dario Giustozzi | Ret | 18 | Ret | 19 | 16 | 10 | 9 | 14 | 9 | Ret | 7 | Ret | Ret | 33 |
| 17 | (Brazil) Guilherme Figueirôa | 9 | 9 | 20 | 15 | 12 | 17 | Ret | 11 | Ret | 13 | Ret | 15 | Ret | 29,5 |
| 18 | (Brazil) Eduardo Rocha Azevedo | | | 8 | DNS | DNS | | | | | | | 6 | 14 | 23 |
| 19 | (Brazil) Constantino Jr. | | | | | | 5 | 10 | | | | | | | 20 |
| 20 | (Brazil) Ramon Alcaraz | | | 18 | DNS | DNS | | | Ret | 12 | 10 | 8 | | | 20 |
| 21 | (Brazil) Cleber Faria | 13 | 13 | 14 | 17 | 18 | 16 | 12 | 18 | 13 | 15 | Ret | 19 | 15 | 18.5 |
| 22 | (Brazil) Marcio Basso | 11 | 11 | 13 | 12 | 17 | | | | | | | | | 17,5 |
| 23 | (Argentina) Pablo Otero | | | | | | | | 17 | 7 | 14 | 12 | | | 9 |
| 24 | (Brazil) Eloi Khouri | | | | | | | | | | | | 13 | 7 | 13 |
| 25 | (Brazil) Guilherme Reischl | | | | | | | | | | 12 | Ret | 18 | Ret | 5 |
| 26 | (Brazil) Beto Leite | | | | | | | | 13 | 15 | Ret | DNS | 21 | Ret | 5 |
| 27 | (Brazil) Paulo Pomelli | | | | | | 14 | Ret | Ret | 14 | | | 20 | Ret | 5 |
| 28 | (Brazil) Marcelo Stallone | | | 19 | 16 | 13 | | | | | | | | | 3 |
| 29 | (Brazil) Cristiano Piquet | Ret | 19 | 15 | Ret | Ret | | | | | | | | | 2 |
| | (Sweden) Matte Karlsson | | | | | | | | | | | | 17 | Ret | 0 |
| | (Brazil) Alceu Feldmann | DNS | DNS | | | | | | | | | | | | 0 |
| Pos | Driver | CUR | | INT | | | VEC | | BUA | | TRH | | INT | | Pts |

| Colour | Result |
|---|---|
| Gold | Winner |
| Silver | Second place |
| Bronze | Third place |
| Green | Points classification |
| Blue | Non-points classification |
| Blue | Non-classified finish (NC) |
| Purple | Retired, not classified (Ret) |
| Red | Did not qualify (DNQ) |
| Red | Did not pre-qualify (DNPQ) |
| Black | Disqualified (DSQ) |
| White | Did not start (DNS) |
| White | Withdrew (WD) |
| White | Race cancelled (C) |
| Blank | Did not practice (DNP) |
| Blank | Did not arrive (DNA) |
| Blank | Excluded (EX) |

**Bold** – Pole position

Italics – Fastest lap

† – Retired, but classified

=== Challenge ===
| Pos | Driver | CUR | INT | VEC | BUA (Note: Only the best result at Buenos Aires round count for the championship in challenge class.) | | TRH (Note: Only the best result at Termas de Río Hondo count for the championship in challenge class.) | | INT | Pts |
|---|---|---|---|---|---|---|---|---|---|---|
| 1 | (Brazil) Marçal Müller | **1** | **1** | **1** | 2 | Ret | **1** | Ret | 2 | 98 (116) |
| 2 | (Brazil) Eloi Khouri | 3 | 3 | 7 | **1** | **1** | 2 | 1 | **4** | 86 (95) |
| 3 | (Panama) Marcus Vario | 5 | 2 | 2 | 4 | Ret | 9 | 15 | 1 | 82 (89) |
| 4 | (Brazil) Tom Filho | | 7 | 3 | 3 | 16 | 3 | 2 | 9 | 66 |
| 5 | (Brazil) Rodrigo Mello | 2 | 4 | Ret | 5 | 17 | 15 | 5 | 8 | 64 |
| 6 | (Brazil) Pedro Costa | 6 | 10 | 5 | 10 | 3 | 4 | 3 | 6 | 64 (70) |
| 7 | (Brazil) Luiz Fernando Elias | 10 | 6 | 6 | 9 | 4 | 6 | Ret | 5 | 56 (62) |
| 8 | (Brazil) Rouman Ziemkiewicz | 8 | Ret | 4 | Ret | 10 | 7 | 4 | Ret | 42 |
| 9 | (Brazil) Ronaldo Kastropil | 4 | 9 | | 8 | 7 | | | 3 | 39 (46) |
| 10 | (Argentina) Pablo Delponte | | 11 | | Ret | 5 | 5 | 6 | 13 | 32 |
| 11 | (Brazil) Mauricio Salla | 13 | 12 | 8 | 7 | 11 | 13 | 8 | | 32 |
| 12 | (Brazil) Paulo Totaro | 9 | 18 | 9 | 12 | 12 | 12 | 11 | 12 | 27 |
| 13 | (Brazil) Luca Seripieri | Ret | 14 | 16 | 13 | 2 | 10 | 10 | Ret | 26 |
| 14 | (Brazil) Marcus Peres | Ret | 5 | Ret | 6 | 8 | | | Ret | 22 |
| 15 | (Brazil) Ramon Alcaraz | 7 | | 10 | | | | | 10 | 21 |
| 16 | (Brazil) Francisco Horta | 11 | 13 | 15 | 15 | 6 | Ret | Ret | 15 | 20 |
| 17 | (Brazil) Marco Billi | Ret | 15 | 12 | 14 | 9 | Ret | 7 | Ret | 19 |
| 18 | (Brazil) Marcelo Parodi | 12 | 16 | 14 | 16 | 14 | 14 | 14 | 14 | 12 |
| 19 | (Brazil) Guilherme Reischl | Ret | 17 | 11 | 11 | 13 | | | | 10 |
| 20 | (Brazil) Lucas Peres | | | | | | 8 | 7 | | 9 |
| 21 | (Brazil) Raulino Kreis Jr. | | | | | | | | 7 | 9 |
| 22 | (Paraguay) Odair dos Santos | | 8 | Ret | | | | | | 8 |
| 23 | (Argentina) Dominique Teysseyre | | | | | | 11 | 13 | | 5 |
| 24 | (Argentina) Fabian Taraborelli | | | | | | | | 11 | 5 |
| 25 | (Brazil) Fernando Guerra | | | | Ret | 15 | Ret | 12 | Ret | 5 |
| 26 | (Brazil) Ricardo Mendes | | | 13 | | | | | | 3 |
| Pos | Driver | CUR | INT | VEC | BUA | | TRH | | INT | Pts |

| Colour | Result |
|---|---|
| Gold | Winner |
| Silver | Second place |
| Bronze | Third place |
| Green | Points classification |
| Blue | Non-points classification |
| Blue | Non-classified finish (NC) |
| Purple | Retired, not classified (Ret) |
| Red | Did not qualify (DNQ) |
| Red | Did not pre-qualify (DNPQ) |
| Black | Disqualified (DSQ) |
| White | Did not start (DNS) |
| White | Withdrew (WD) |
| White | Race cancelled (C) |
| Blank | Did not practice (DNP) |
| Blank | Did not arrive (DNA) |
| Blank | Excluded (EX) |

**Bold** – Pole position

Italics – Fastest lap

† – Retired, but classified

=== Endurance ===
| Pos | Driver | VEC | GOI | INT | Pts |
Cup
| 1= | (Brazil) Miguel Paludo | 2 | 5 | 7 | 168 |
| 2= | (Brazil) Lico Kaesemodel (Brazil) Ricardo Zonta | 1 | 7 | 9 | 154 |
| 3= | (Brazil) Eduardo Azevedo (Brazil) Ricardo Maurício | Ret | 4 | 2 | 154 |
| 4 | (Brazil) Noberto Gresse | 2 | 5 | 10 (Note: Gresse is part of a different pairing at Interlagos because Pauldo's sponsor, Brandt Agriculture Products, has a co-driver from the sponsor's headquarters available that weekend.) | 151 |
| 5= | (Brazil) Ricardo Baptista (Brazil) Valdeno Brito | **DSQ** | 3 | 3 | 149 |
| 6= | (Brazil) João Paulo Mauro (Brazil) Felipe Fraga | 11 | Ret | 1 | 142 |
| 7 | (Brazil) Sergio Jimenez | 8 | **1** | **12** | 137 |
| 8= | (Brazil) Sylvio de Barros (Brazil) Cacá Bueno | 20 | 2 | 8 | 135 |
| 9= | (Brazil) Pedro Queirolo (Brazil) Clemente Lunardi | 14 | 9 | 5 | 129 |
| 10= | (Brazil) Rodrigo Baptista | | **1** | **12** | 68 |
| 10= | (Brazil) Adalberto Baptista (Brazil) Bruno Baptista | 7 | | 6 | 104 |
| 11 | (Brazil) Daniel Schneider | 8 | 6 | 14 | 102 |
| 12= | (Brazil) Beto Leite (Brazil) Nonô Figueiredo | 5 | 15 | 13 | 101 |
| 13= | (Brazil) Tom Valle (Brazil) Daniel Serra | | | 4 | 85 |
| 14= | (Brazil) Marcel Visconde | 6 | | 11 | 80 |
| 15= | (Brazil) Felipe Nasr | 4 | Ret | 18 | 73 |
| 16= | (Argentina) Ramon Alcaraz (Brazil) Bia Figueiredo | 19 | | 10 | 65 |
| 17= | (United States) Justin Allgaier | | | 7 | 62 |
| 17= | (Panama) Marcus Vario | 9 | 8 | Ret | 62 |
| 17= | (Brazil) Alberto Valério | 9 | 8 | | 62 |
| 17= | (Brazil) Werner Neugebauer | 18 | Ret | 11 | 62 |
| 18= | (Brazil) Marçal Müller | 3 | Ret | Ret | 55 |
| 18= | (Brazil) Pedro Piquet | 3 | Ret | | 55 |
| 19= | (Brazil) Guilherme Reischl | | 11 | 15 | 52 |
| 20= | (Brazil) Ingo Hoffmann | 4 | | | 50 |
| 21= | (Brazil) Fernando Fortes | 6 | | | 40 |
| 21= | (Brazil) Nelson Piquet Jr. | | 6 | | 40 |
| 22= | (Brazil) Marcos Gomes | | | 13 | 40 |
| 23= | (Austria) Thomas Preining | | | 14 | 29 |
| 24= | (Brazil) Juliano Moro | | 11 | | 26 |
| 24= | (Brazil) Francisco Horta (Brazil) Fabio Carbone | | | 15 | 26 |
| 25 | (Brazil) Carlos Ambrósio | | Ret | 18 | 23 |
| 26= | (Brazil) Allam Khodair | 18 | | | 22 |
| 27= | (Brazil) Marcelo Stallone (Brazil) Beto Posses (Brazil) Rodolfo Ometto | | | 26 | 21 |
| 28= | (Brazil) Kreis Jr. (Brazil) Giulio Borlenghi (Brazil) Lucas Foresti | | | 28 | 19 |
| | (Brazil) Renan Guerra | | Ret | | |
| | (Brazil) Denis Navarro | | | Ret | |
| | (Norway) Dennis Olsen | | | Ret | |
| | (Brazil) Júlio Campos (Brazil) Guilherme Figueirôa | | DSQ | | 0 |
| | Challenge | | | | |
| 1= | (Brazil) Luca Seripieri (Brazil) Alan Hellmeister | 16 | 11 | 16 | 108 |
| 2= | (Brazil) Marcus Peres (Brazil) Lucas Peres | 12 | 14 | 19 | 97 |
| 3= | (Brazil) Tom Filho (Brazil) Rodrigo Mello | 13 | 17 | 17 | 95 |
| 4= | (Brazil) Rodolfo Toni (Brazil) Dennis Dirani | 10 | 19 | 22 | 79 |
| 5= | (Brazil) Marco Billi (Brazil) Maurizio Billi | 21 | 16 | 23 | 67 |
| 6= | (Brazil) Eloi Khouri | **17** | **13** | **27** | 66 |
| 6= | (Brazil) Nando Elias (Brazil) Rouman Ziemkiewicz | 23 | 21 | 20 | 66 |
| 7= | (Brazil) Paulo Totaro | 15 | Ret | 21 | 59 |
| 7= | (Brazil) Ronaldo Kastropil | 15 | | 21 | 59 |
| 8 | (Brazil) João Gonçalves | | | 17 | 50 |
| 9 | (Argentina) Dominique Teysseyre | 22 | 12 | | 44 |
| 10= | (Brazil) Marco Cozzi | **17** | | **27** | 40 |
| 10= | (Brazil) Ricardo Mendes | | 18 | 25 | 40 |
| 11 | (Brazil) Laszlo Piquet | | | 21 | 36 |
| 12 | (Brazil) Danilo Dirani | | | 22 | 32 |
| 13 | (Brazil) Fábio Carbone | | 12 | | 29 |
| 14= | (Argentina) Esteban Guerrieri | | **13** | | 26 |
| 14= | (Chile) Mario Chomalí (Chile) Carlos Ruiz | | | 24 | 26 |
| 15= | (Brazil) Leandro Romera (Brazil) Alexandre Auler | | | 25 | 23 |
| 16 | (Brazil) Diego Nunes | | | **27** | 21 |
| 17 | (Brazil) Sérgio Maggi | | 18 | | 17 |
| 18 | (Brazil) Giuliano Losacco | 22 | | | 15 |
| | (Brazil) Fernando Fortes | | Ret | | 0 |
| Pos | Driver | VEC | GOI | INT | Pts |

| Colour | Result |
|---|---|
| Gold | Winner |
| Silver | Second place |
| Bronze | Third place |
| Green | Points classification |
| Blue | Non-points classification |
| Blue | Non-classified finish (NC) |
| Purple | Retired, not classified (Ret) |
| Red | Did not qualify (DNQ) |
| Red | Did not pre-qualify (DNPQ) |
| Black | Disqualified (DSQ) |
| White | Did not start (DNS) |
| White | Withdrew (WD) |
| White | Race cancelled (C) |
| Blank | Did not practice (DNP) |
| Blank | Did not arrive (DNA) |
| Blank | Excluded (EX) |

**Bold** – Pole position

Italics – Fastest lap

† – Retired, but classified
