= Rodrigo Baptista =

Brazilian racing driver (born 1996)

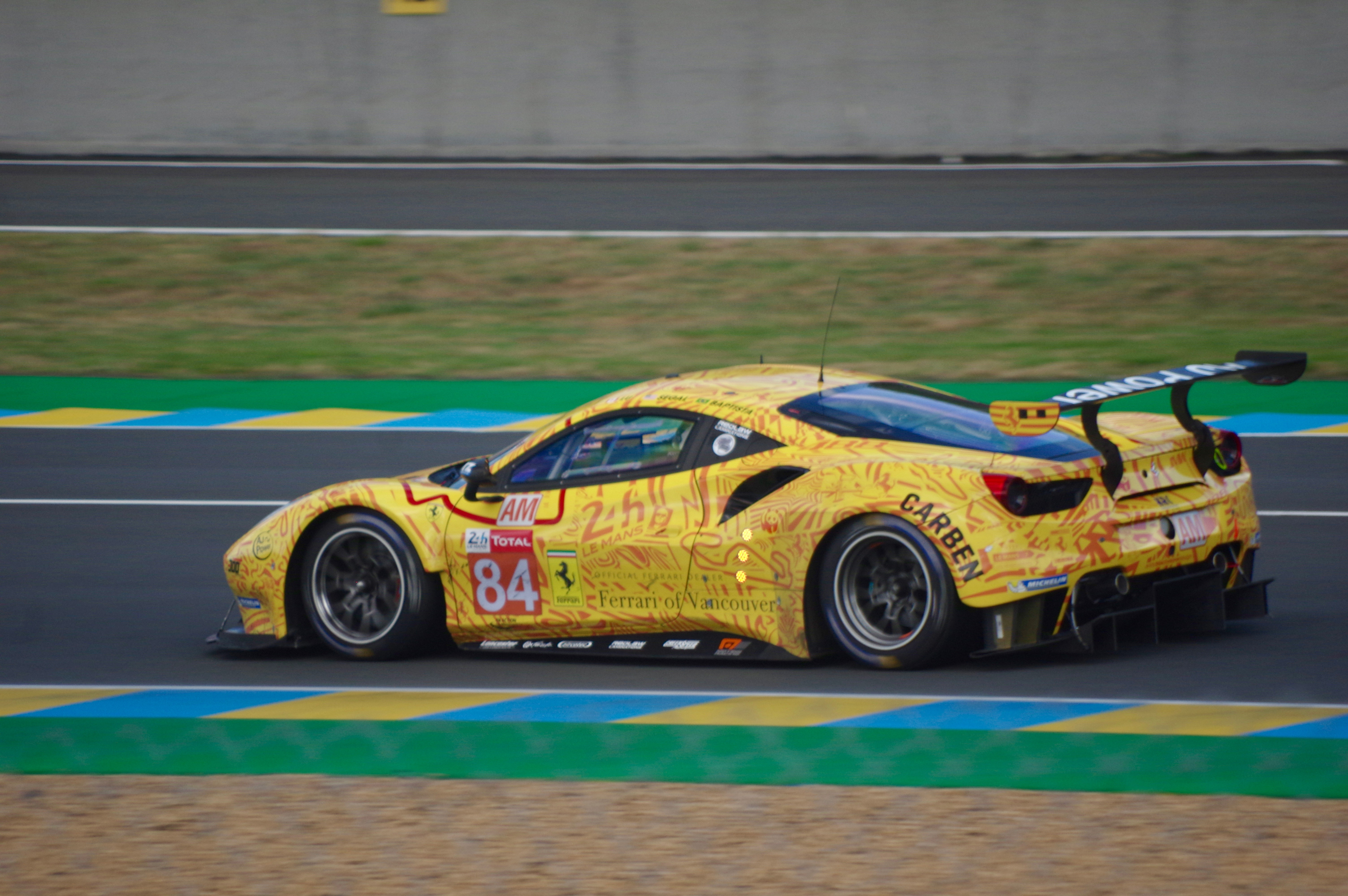
- Baptista in 2019
- Nationality: (Brazil) Brazilian
- Born: Rodrigo Annicchino Dellape Baptista; 13 September 1996 (age 30) São Paulo, Brazil
- Relatives: Bruno Baptista (cousin)
- Categorisation: FIA Silver (until 2019); FIA Gold (2020–)

Championship titles
- 2017: Porsche GT3 Cup Brasil

Rodrigo Annicchino Dellape "Digo" Baptista (born 13 September 1996) is a Brazilian racing driver who last competed in TCR South America for Squadra Martino.

== Personal life ==
Baptista is part of a racing family. He is the nephew of Ricardo Baptista and the son of Adalberto Baptista, who both are racing drivers, as well as being the cousin of Cadi and Bruno Baptista, also racing drivers.

== Career ==
Baptista made his single-seater debut in 2014, making a one-off appearance in the Formula 4 Sudamericana. Remaining in single-seaters for 2015, Baptista joined Prop Car Racing for his only season in Formula 3 Brasil, in which he scored a lone win at Velopark and five other podiums to end the year fourth in points. In parallel, Baptista also raced in Brasileiro de Marcas for Toyota Bassani, taking his only win of the season at Goiânia en route to an 11th-place points finish.

The following year, Baptista joined ETEC Motorsport to compete in the Toyota Racing Series at the beginning of the year. In the five-round winter series, Baptista scored a best result of ninth in race one at Teretonga Park, helping him end the season 16th in points. For the rest of the year, he made his debut in GT3 competition, racing in both the Blancpain GT Series Sprint and Endurance Cups for Belgian Audi Club Team WRT. Taking a best result of 11th in the former, Baptista found more success in the latter, finishing third at Le Castellet to end the year 15th in points. During 2016, Baptista also made a one-off appearance in the Renault Sport Trophy for Oregon Team.

In 2017, Baptista joined Flying Lizard Motorsports to race in the GTS class of the Pirelli World Challenge. In his first season in the series, Baptista won both races at Lime Rock, before taking further wins in Utah and Circuit of the Americas en route to a fourth-place points finish. In parallel, Baptista raced in Porsche GT3 Cup Brasil, taking seven wins and three further podiums to secure the title at the end of the year. Stepping up to the GT class for 2018, Baptista joined Bentley-affiliated K-PAX Racing to race in both the Pirelli World Challenge and the SprintX GT Championship Series. In the former, Baptista took his first win at VIR, before winning both races at Watkins Glen to end the year fourth in points. In the latter, Baptista took his only win of the season at VIR to also finish fourth in the season standings. During 2018, Baptista also raced for the same team at the California 8 Hours.

Remaining with K-PAX Racing for 2019, Baptista raced with them in the newly rebranded Blancpain GT World Challenge America alongside Maxime Soulet. In his third season in the series, Baptista took wins at Circuit of the Americas and VIR, as well as seven more podiums to secure third in the overall standings. During 2019, Baptista also raced in the 24 Hours of Le Mans for JMW Motorsport in the LMGTE Am class, originally crossing the line in third, but was promoted to second post-race after the race-winning Keating Motorsports Ford was disqualified. Also during the year, Baptista raced for Team M-Sport Team Bentley at the 24 Hours of Spa and the Kyalami 9 Hours.

Continuing in GT World Challenge America for 2020, Baptista joined Ferrari-fielding Squadra Corse to compete in the Pro-Am class. In his only season in the class, Baptista scored overall wins at Sonoma and the second Circuit of the Americas round, as well as two more class wins as he ended the year third in the Pro-Am standings. During 2020, Baptista also raced for Bentley K-PAX Racing in the GT World Challenge Europe Endurance Cup.

Switching to TCR competition for 2021, Baptista joined Cobra Racing Team to race in TCR South America, as well as competing in the Pure ETCR Championship for Romeo Ferraris - M1RA. In the former, Baptista won the Curitiba endurance and both races at El Pinar, as well as standing on the podium three more times to secure runner-up honors in the standings. In the latter, Baptista scored a best result of third at MotorLand Aragón and finished no lower than ninth in the other four races to end the year fifth in points.

Baptista then raced in Stock Car Pro Series for the following two seasons, competing for Crown Racing in 2022 and KTF Sports in 2023, taking a best result of fifth in race one at Velopark in the latter year as he ended the year 27th in points. During 2023, Baptista also raced in select rounds of the GT World Challenge Europe Endurance Cup for AKKodis ASP Team, as well as a one-off appearance in TCR South America for Cobra Racing Team.

Returning to TCR competition for 2024, Baptista joined Squadra Martino to race in both TCR South America and TCR Brazil. Baptista raced in all but two rounds of both series, scoring a lone win at Cascavel and finishing ninth in South American standings and eighth in the latter's standings. During 2024, Baptista returned to Flying Lizard Motorsports to race part-time in the Pro-Am class of the GT4 America Series. Baptista was set to return to the GT4 America Series with Flying Lizard Motorsports alongside Damir Hot the following year, before the team pulled out of the series in March.

== Racing record ==
=== Racing career summary ===
Season	Series	Team	Races	Wins	Poles	F/Laps	Podiums	Points	Position
2014	Formula 4 Sudamericana		3	0	0	0	1	23	16th
2015	Formula 3 Brasil	Prop Car Racing	16	1	0	0	7	102	4th
2015	Brasileiro de Marcas	Toyota Bassani	16	1	0	0	1	119	11th
2015	FARA Endurance Championship - MP-1B	BRT Motorsports	1	1	1	0	1	20	8th
2016	Toyota Racing Series	ETEC Motorsport	15	0	0	0	0	286	16th
2016	Blancpain GT Series Endurance Cup	Belgian Audi Club Team WRT	5	0	0	0	1	19	15th
2016	Blancpain GT Series Sprint Cup	Belgian Audi Club Team WRT	10	0	0	0	0	0	NC
2016	Renault Sport Trophy – Pro	Oregon Team	1	0	0	0	0	0	NC
2016	Renault Sport Trophy – Endurance	Oregon Team	2	0	0	0	0	0	NC
2017	Pirelli World Challenge – GTS	Flying Lizard Motorsports	18	4	1	1	6	257	4th
2017	Porsche GT3 Cup Brasil		13	7	6	9	10	257	**1st**
2017	Porsche GT3 Cup Brasil Endurance Series		2	1	1	0	1	68	10th
2018	Pirelli World Challenge – GT	K-PAX Racing	19	3	3	3	5	325	4th
2018	SprintX GT Championship Series – GT	K-PAX Racing	10	1	1	1	2	170	4th
2018	Intercontinental GT Challenge	K-PAX Racing	1	0	0	0	0	1	25th
2019	Blancpain GT World Challenge America	K-PAX Racing	14	2	0	2	9	195	**3rd**
2019	Blancpain GT Series Endurance Cup	Team M-Sport Team Bentley	1	0	0	0	0	0	NC
2019	Intercontinental GT Challenge	Team M-Sport Team Bentley	2	0	0	0	0	0	NC
2019	24 Hours of Le Mans – LMGTE Am	JMW Motorsport	1	0	0	0	1	—N/a	**2nd**
2020	GT World Challenge America – Pro-Am	Squadra Corse	10	5	3	1	9	198	**3rd**
2020	GT World Challenge Europe Endurance Cup	Bentley K-PAX Racing	4	0	0	0	0	0	NC
2020	Intercontinental GT Challenge	Bentley K-PAX Racing	1	0	0	0	0	1	21st
2021	Pure ETCR Championship	Romeo Ferraris - M1RA	5	0	—N/a	—N/a	1	248	5th
2021	TCR South America Touring Car Championship	Cobra Racing Team	14	3	2	4	6	247	**2nd**
2022	Stock Car Pro Series	Crown Racing	23	0	0	0	0	44	29th
2023	Stock Car Pro Series	KTF Sports	23	0	0	0	0	68	27th
2023	GT World Challenge Europe Endurance Cup	AKKodis ASP Team	3	0	0	0	0	0	NC
2023	GT World Challenge Europe Endurance Cup – Bronze	AKKodis ASP Team	3	0	0	0	0	0	NC
2023	TCR South America Touring Car Championship	Cobra Racing Team	1	0	0	0	0	9	45th
2024	TCR Brazil Touring Car Championship	Squadra Martino	7	1	1	1	1	158	8th
2024	TCR South America Touring Car Championship	Squadra Martino	13	1	2	1	2	235	9th
2024	TCR World Tour	Squadra Martino	2	0	0	0	0	4	40th
2024	GT4 America Series – Pro-Am	Flying Lizard Motorsports	7	0	0	0	2	52	13th

=== Complete Formula 3 Brasil results ===
(key) (Races in bold indicate pole position) (Races in italics indicate fastest lap)

Year	Entrant	1	2	3	4	5	6	7	8	9	10	11	12	13	14	15	16	Pos	Points
2015	Prop Car Racing	CUR1; 1; 2	CUR1; 2; 3	VEL; 1; 1	VEL; 2; 7	SCS; 1 Ret	SCS; 2 Ret	CUR2; 1 Ret	CUR2; 2; 4	CAS; 1; 4	CAS; 2; 5	CGR; 1 Ret	CGR; 2; 2	CUR3; 1; 6	CUR3; 2; 3	INT; 1; 4	INT; 2; 3	4th	102

=== Complete Toyota Racing Series results ===
(key) (Races in bold indicate pole position) (Races in italics indicate fastest lap)

Year	Team	1	2	3	4	5	6	7	8	9	10	11	12	13	14	15	DC	Points
2016	ETEC Motorsport	RUA; 1 Ret	RUA; 2; 16	RUA; 3; 13	TER; 1; 9	TER; 2; 18	TER; 3; 16	HMP; 1; 15	HMP; 2; 14	HMP; 3; 14	TAU; 1; 17	TAU; 2 Ret	TAU; 3 Ret	MAU; 1; 11	MAU; 2; 16	MAU; 3; 11	16th	286

=== Complete GT World Challenge Europe results ===
==== GT World Challenge Europe Endurance Cup ====
Year	Team	Car	Class	1	2	3	4	5	6	7	Pos.	Points
2016	Belgian Audi Club Team WRT	Audi R8 LMS	Pro	MNZ; 16	SIL; 20	LEC; 3	SPA; 6H; 30	SPA; 12H; 19	SPA; 24H; 12	NÜR; 46	15th	19
2019	M-Sport Team Bentley	Bentley Continental GT3	Pro	MNZ	SIL	LEC	SPA; 6H; 72	SPA; 12H; 72	SPA; 24H; Ret	CAT	NC	0
2020	Bentley K-PAX Racing	Bentley Continental GT3	Pro	IMO; 30	NÜR; Ret	SPA; 6H; 30	SPA; 12H; 16	SPA; 24H; 12	LEC; Ret		NC	0
2023	AKKodis ASP Team	Mercedes-AMG GT3 Evo	Bronze	MNZ	LEC; 40†	SPA; 6H; 58	SPA; 12H; 45	SPA; 24H; Ret	NÜR	CAT; 43	NC	0

==== GT World Challenge Europe Sprint Cup ====
Year	Team	Car	Class	1	2	3	4	5	6	7	8	9	10	Pos.	Points
2016	Belgian Audi Club Team WRT	Audi R8 LMS	Pro	MIS; QR; 33	MIS; CR; 21	BRH; QR; 20	BRH; CR; Ret	NÜR; QR; 13	NÜR; CR; 11	HUN; QR; 15	HUN; CR; 28	CAT; QR; 15	CAT; CR; 32	NC	0

=== Complete 24 Hours of Le Mans results ===
Year	Team	Co-Drivers	Car	Class	Laps	Pos.	Class Pos.
2019	(United Kingdom) JMW Motorsport	(United States) Jeff Segal (Canada) Wei Lu	Ferrari 488 GTE	GTE; Am	334	32nd	**2nd**

=== Complete Stock Car Pro Series results ===
Year	Team	Car	1	2	3	4	5	6	7	8	9	10	11	12	13	14	15	16	17	18	19	20	21	22	23	24	Rank	Points
2022	Crown Racing	Chevrolet Cruze	INT; 1; 18	GOI; 1; 27	GOI; 2; 20	RIO; 1; 19	RIO; 2; 17	VCA; 1 Ret	VCA; 2; 18	VEL; 1; 18	VEL; 2; 21	VEL; 1; 22	VEL; 2; 18	INT; 1 DSQ	INT; 2 DSQ	VCA; 1; 24	VCA; 2; 21	SCZ; 1; 25	SCZ; 2; 11	GOI; 1; 13	GOI; 2 Ret	GOI; 1; 14	GOI; 2; 23	INT; 1; 24	INT; 2 Ret		29th	44
2023	KTF Sports	Chevrolet Cruze	GOI; 1; 18	GOI; 2 Ret	INT; 1; 20	INT; 2 Ret	TAR; 1; 18	TAR; 2; 17	CAS; 1 Ret	CAS; 2; 23	INT; 1; 18	INT; 2; 24	VCA; 1 Ret	VCA; 2 DNS	GOI; 1 Ret	GOI; 2; 15	VEL; 1; 5	VEL; 2; 10	BUE; 1; 16	BUE; 2; 18	VCA; 1; 15	VCA; 2 Ret	CAS; 1 Ret	CAS; 2 Ret	INT; 1; 20	INT; 2; 16	27th	68

^{†} Did not finish the race, but was classified as he completed over 90% of the race distance.

=== Complete TCR World Tour results ===
(key) (Races in bold indicate pole position) (Races in italics indicate fastest lap)

Year	Team	Car	1	2	3	4	5	6	7	8	9	10	11	12	13	14	DC	Points
2024	Squadra Martino	Honda Civic Type R TCR (FK8)	ITA; 1	ITA; 2	MAR; 1	MAR; 2	USA; 1	USA; 2	BRA; 1; 12	BRA; 2 Ret	URU; 1	URU; 2	CHN; 1	CHN; 2	MAC; 1	MAC; 2	40th	4
