= Constantino Júnior =

Brazilian businessman and racing driver (1968–2026)

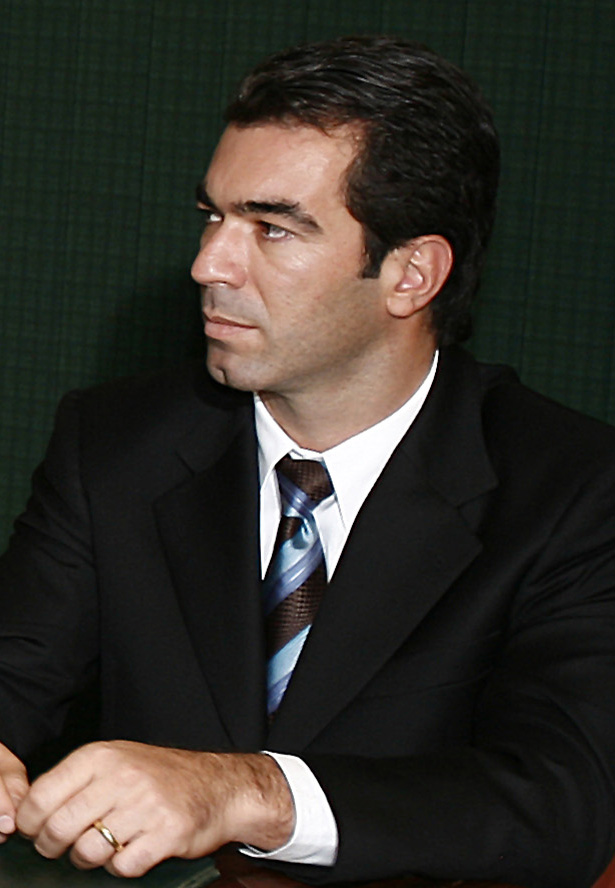
Oliveira in 2007

Constantino de Oliveira Júnior (12 August 1968 – 24 January 2026) was a Brazilian businessman. He was the chairman of Gol Transportes Aéreos and had previously been the CEO of the airline from 2001 until 2012.

== Life and career ==
=== Early life and business career ===
Oliveira was born in Patrocínio, Brazil and finished high school in Brasilia. He launched the low-cost airline, GOL. Under de Oliveira's leadership as chief executive, it became Brazil's third-largest airline behind Azul and LATAM. He shared the controlling stake in GOL with his three brothers - Henrique Constantino, Joaquim Constantino Neto, and Ricardo Constantino. He was the CEO of Gol until 2012 when Paulo Kakinoff took over the role.

=== Auto racing ===
Oliveira was also a part-time racing car driver. He competed in Porsche GT3 Cup Brasil, winning the title in 2011 and 2014. He also competed in 1993 International Formula 3000 Championship and 2010 Stock Car Brasil season.

=== Death ===
Oliveira died from cancer in São Paulo, on 24 January 2026, at the age of 57.

== Racing record ==
=== Complete International Formula 3000 Championship results ===
(key) (Races in bold indicate pole position) (Races in italics indicate fastest lap)

Year	Team	Chassis	Engine	1	2	3	4	5	6	7	8	9	DC	Pts
1993	European Technique	Reynard 92D	Cosworth	DON; Ret	SIL; Ret	PAU; DNQ	PER; DNQ	HOC; Ret	NÜR; 17	SPA; 17	MAG; 8	NOG; 15	24th	0
