= 2021 Pit Boss 250 =

Race details
- Race 11 of 33 in the 2021 NASCAR Xfinity Series season
- Circuit of the Americas
- Date: May 22, 2021
- Location: Circuit of the Americas in Austin, Texas
- Course: Permanent racing facility
- Course length: 3.410 miles (5.488 km)
- Distance: 46 laps, 156.860 mi (252.442 km)
- Average speed: 72.723 mph

Pole position
| Driver | Kyle Busch | Joe Gibbs Racing |
- Time: 160.349

Most laps led
| Driver | Kyle Busch | Joe Gibbs Racing |
- Laps: 35

Winner
| No. 54 | Kyle Busch | Joe Gibbs Racing |

Television in the United States
- Network: FS1
- Announcers: Adam Alexander, Bubba Wallace, and Ryan Blaney

The 2021 Pit Boss 250 was a NASCAR Xfinity Series race held on May 22, 2021. It was contested over 46 laps on the 3.410-mile (5.488 km) road course. It was the eleventh race of the 2021 NASCAR Xfinity Series season. Joe Gibbs Racing driver Kyle Busch, collected his first win of the season, and his 98th of his career.

== Report ==
=== Background ===
Circuit of the Americas (COTA) is a grade 1 FIA-specification motorsports facility located within the extraterritorial jurisdiction of Austin, Texas. It features a 3.426-mile (5.514 km) road racing circuit. The facility is home to the Formula One United States Grand Prix, and the Motorcycle Grand Prix of the Americas, a round of the FIM Road Racing World Championship. It previously hosted the Supercars Championship, the FIA World Endurance Championship, the IMSA SportsCar Championship, and IndyCar Series.

On September 30, 2020, it was announced that COTA would host a NASCAR Xfinity Series event for the first time on May 22, 2021. The Camping World Truck Series was added as a support event. On December 11, 2020, it was announced that NASCAR would run the full 3.41 mile course.

=== Entry list ===
- (R) denotes rookie driver.
- (i) denotes driver who is ineligible for series driver points.

| No. | Driver | Team | Manufacturer |
|---|---|---|---|
| 0 | Jeffrey Earnhardt | JD Motorsports | Chevrolet |
| 1 | Michael Annett | JR Motorsports | Chevrolet |
| 2 | Myatt Snider | Richard Childress Racing | Chevrolet |
| 02 | Brett Moffitt | Our Motorsports | Chevrolet |
| 4 | Landon Cassill | JD Motorsports | Chevrolet |
| 5 | Kevin Harvick (i) | B. J. McLeod Motorsports | Ford |
| 6 | Spencer Pumpelly | JD Motorsports | Chevrolet |
| 7 | Justin Allgaier | JR Motorsports | Chevrolet |
| 07 | Ross Chastain (i) | SS-Green Light Racing | Chevrolet |
| 8 | Miguel Paludo | JR Motorsports | Chevrolet |
| 9 | Noah Gragson | JR Motorsports | Chevrolet |
| 10 | Jeb Burton | Kaulig Racing | Chevrolet |
| 11 | Justin Haley | Kaulig Racing | Chevrolet |
| 13 | Boris Said | MBM Motorsports | Toyota |
| 15 | Colby Howard | JD Motorsports | Chevrolet |
| 16 | A. J. Allmendinger | Kaulig Racing | Chevrolet |
| 17 | Cole Custer (i) | SS-Green Light Racing with Rick Ware Racing | Ford |
| 18 | Daniel Hemric | Joe Gibbs Racing | Toyota |
| 19 | Brandon Jones | Joe Gibbs Racing | Toyota |
| 20 | Harrison Burton | Joe Gibbs Racing | Toyota |
| 22 | Austin Cindric | Team Penske | Ford |
| 23 | Andy Lally | Our Motorsports | Chevrolet |
| 26 | Kris Wright (i) | Sam Hunt Racing | Toyota |
| 31 | Tyler Reddick (i) | Jordan Anderson Racing | Chevrolet |
| 36 | Alex Labbé | DGM Racing | Chevrolet |
| 39 | Ryan Sieg | RSS Racing | Ford |
| 44 | Tommy Joe Martins | Martins Motorsports | Chevrolet |
| 47 | Kyle Weatherman | Mike Harmon Racing | Chevrolet |
| 48 | Jade Buford (R) | Big Machine Racing Team | Chevrolet |
| 51 | Jeremy Clements | Jeremy Clements Racing | Chevrolet |
| 52 | Gray Gaulding | Means Racing | Chevrolet |
| 54 | Kyle Busch (i) | Joe Gibbs Racing | Toyota |
| 61 | Stephen Leicht | Hattori Racing Enterprises | Toyota |
| 66 | Timmy Hill (i) | MBM Motorsports | Toyota |
| 68 | Brandon Brown | Brandonbilt Motorsports | Chevrolet |
| 74 | Bayley Currey (i) | Mike Harmon Racing | Chevrolet |
| 77 | Austin Dillon (i) | Bassett Racing | Chevrolet |
| 78 | Jesse Little | B. J. McLeod Motorsports | Toyota |
| 90 | Caesar Bacarella | DGM Racing | Chevrolet |
| 91 | Preston Pardus | DGM Racing | Chevrolet |
| 92 | Josh Williams | DGM Racing | Chevrolet |
| 98 | Riley Herbst | Stewart-Haas Racing | Ford |
| 99 | Ryan Ellis | B. J. McLeod Motorsports | Toyota |
Official entry list

== Practice ==
Austin Cindric was the fastest in the first practice session with a time of 137.778 seconds and a speed of 89.100 mph (143.393 km/h).

| Pos | No. | Driver | Team | Manufacturer | Time | Speed |
|---|---|---|---|---|---|---|
| 1 | 22 | Austin Cindric | Team Penske | Ford | 137.778 | 89.100 |
| 2 | 18 | Daniel Hemric | Joe Gibbs Racing | Toyota | 137.845 | 89.057 |
| 3 | 31 | Tyler Reddick (i) | Jordan Anderson Racing | Chevrolet | 137.963 | 88.980 |
Official first practice results

== Qualifying ==
Kyle Busch scored the pole position after a time of 160.349 seconds and a speed of 76.558 mph (123.208 km/h).

=== Qualifying results ===
| Pos | No | Driver | Team | Manufacturer | Time |
|---|---|---|---|---|---|
| 1 | 54 | Kyle Busch (i) | Joe Gibbs Racing | Toyota | 160.349 |
| 2 | 07 | Ross Chastain (i) | SS-Green Light Racing | Chevrolet | 160.457 |
| 3 | 17 | Cole Custer (i) | SS-Green Light Racing with Rick Ware Racing | Ford | 160.524 |
| 4 | 36 | Alex Labbé | DGM Racing | Chevrolet | 160.640 |
| 5 | 31 | Tyler Reddick (i) | Jordan Anderson Racing | Chevrolet | 161.521 |
| 6 | 11 | Justin Haley | Kaulig Racing | Chevrolet | 161.757 |
| 7 | 16 | A. J. Allmendinger | Kaulig Racing | Chevrolet | 161.876 |
| 8 | 22 | Austin Cindric | Team Penske | Ford | 162.247 |
| 9 | 7 | Justin Allgaier | JR Motorsports | Chevrolet | 162.629 |
| 10 | 20 | Harrison Burton | Joe Gibbs Racing | Toyota | 162.630 |
| 11 | 10 | Jeb Burton | Kaulig Racing | Chevrolet | 163.240 |
| 12 | 5 | Kevin Harvick (i) | B. J. McLeod Motorsports | Ford | 163.397 |
| 13 | 23 | Andy Lally | Our Motorsports | Chevrolet | 164.503 |
| 14 | 68 | Brandon Brownn | Brandonbilt Motorsports | Chevrolet | 164.615 |
| 15 | 8 | Miguel Paludo | JR Motorsports | Chevrolet | 164.791 |
| 16 | 6 | Spencer Pumpelly | JD Motorsports | Chevrolet | 165.213 |
| 17 | 77 | Austin Dillon (i) | Bassett Racing | Chevrolet | 165.237 |
| 18 | 48 | Jade Buford (R) | Big Machine Racing Team | Chevrolet | 165.245 |
| 19 | 19 | Brandon Jones | Joe Gibbs Racing | Toyota | 163.305 |
| 20 | 9 | Noah Gragson | JR Motorsports | Chevrolet | 165.462 |
| 21 | 02 | Brett Moffitt | Our Motorsports | Chevrolet | 165.547 |
| 22 | 91 | Preston Pardus | DGM Racing | Chevrolet | 165.596 |
| 23 | 2 | Myatt Snider | Richard Childress Racing | Chevrolet | 165.775 |
| 24 | 13 | Boris Said | MBM Motorsports | Toyota | 165.971 |
| 25 | 52 | Gray Gaulding | Means Motorsports | Chevrolet | 166.034 |
| 26 | 18 | Daniel Hemric | Joe Gibbs Racing | Toyota | 166.107 |
| 27 | 15 | Colby Howard | JD Motorsports | Chevrolet | 166.167 |
| 28 | 66 | Timmy Hill | MBM Motorsports | Toyota | 166.229 |
| 29 | 98 | Riley Herbst | Stewart-Haas Racing | Ford | 166.393 |
| 30 | 4 | Landon Cassill | JD Motorsports | Chevrolet | 166.515 |
| 31 | 99 | Ryan Ellis | B. J. McLeod Motorsports | Toyota | 166.520 |
| 32 | 44 | Tommy Joe Martins | Martins Motorsports | Chevrolet | 167.094 |
| 33 | 51 | Jeremy Clements | Jeremy Clements Racing | Chevrolet | 167.237 |
| 34 | 39 | Ryan Sieg | RSS Racing | Ford | 168.903 |
| 35 | 1 | Michael Annett | JR Motorsports | Chevrolet | 169.105 |
| 36 | 26 | Kris Wright (i) | Sam Hunt Racing | Chevrolet | 169.304 |
Did not qualify
| 37 | 0 | Jeffrey Earnhardt | JD Motorsports | Chevrolet | 168.066 |
| 38 | 78 | Jesse Little | B. J. McLeod Motorsports | Toyota | 168.182 |
| 39 | 47 | Kyle Weatherman | Mike Harmon Racing | Chevrolet | 168.736 |
| 40 | 61 | Stephen Leicht | Hattori Racing Enterprises | Toyota | 169.060 |
| 41 | 92 | Josh Williams | DGM Racing | Chevrolet | 171.449 |
| 42 | 90 | Caesar Bacarella | DGM Racing | Chevrolet | 175.622 |
| 43 | 74 | Bayley Currey (i) | Mike Harmon Racing | Chevrolet | |
Official qualifying results

== Race ==
=== Race results ===
==== Stage Results ====
Stage One Laps: 14

| Pos | No | Driver | Team | Manufacturer | Points |
|---|---|---|---|---|---|
| 1 | 16 | A. J. Allmendinger | Kaulig Racing | Chevrolet | 10 |
| 2 | 31 | Tyler Reddick (i) | Jordan Anderson Racing | Chevrolet | 0 |
| 3 | 19 | Brandon Jones | Joe Gibbs Racing | Toyota | 8 |
| 4 | 23 | Andy Lally | Our Motorsports | Chevrolet | 7 |
| 5 | 51 | Jeremy Clements | Jeremy Clements Racing | Chevrolet | 6 |
| 6 | 7 | Justin Allgaier | JR Motorsports | Chevrolet | 5 |
| 7 | 5 | Kevin Harvick (i) | B. J. McLeod Motorsports | Chevrolet | 0 |
| 8 | 77 | Austin Dillon (i) | Bassett Racing | Chevrolet | 0 |
| 9 | 22 | Austin Cindric | Team Penske | Ford | 2 |
| 10 | 8 | Miguel Paludo | JR Motorsports | Chevrolet | 1 |

Stage Two Laps: 16

| Pos | No | Driver | Team | Manufacturer | Points |
|---|---|---|---|---|---|
| 1 | 11 | Justin Haley | Kaulig Racing | Chevrolet | 10 |
| 2 | 1 | Michael Annett | JR Motorsports | Chevrolet | 9 |
| 3 | 48 | Jade Buford (R) | Big Machine Racing Team | Chevrolet | 8 |
| 4 | 77 | Austin Dillon (i) | Big Machine Racing Team | Chevrolet | 0 |
| 5 | 54 | Kyle Busch (i) | Joe Gibbs Racing | Toyota | 0 |
| 6 | 51 | Jeremy Clements | Jeremy Clements Racing | Chevrolet | 5 |
| 7 | 7 | Justin Allgaier | JR Motorsports | Chevrolet | 4 |
| 8 | 16 | A. J. Allmendinger | Kaulig Racing | Chevrolet | 3 |
| 9 | 5 | Kevin Harvick (i) | Stewart-Haas Racing | Ford | 0 |
| 10 | 15 | Colby Howard | JD Motorsports | Chevrolet | 1 |

=== Final Stage Results ===
Laps: 16

| Pos | Grid | No | Driver | Team | Manufacturer | Laps | Points | Status |
|---|---|---|---|---|---|---|---|---|
| 1 | 1 | 54 | Kyle Busch (i) | Joe Gibbs Racing | Toyota | 46 | 0 | Running |
| 2 | 7 | 16 | A. J. Allmendinger | Kaulig Racing | Chevrolet | 46 | 48 | Running |
| 3 | 9 | 7 | Justin Allgaier | JR Motorsports | Chevrolet | 46 | 43 | Running |
| 4 | 12 | 5 | Kevin Harvick (i) | B. J. McLeod Motorsports | Chevrolet | 46 | 0 | Running |
| 5 | 8 | 22 | Austin Cindric | Team Penske | Ford | 46 | 34 | Running |
| 6 | 10 | 20 | Harrison Burton | Joe Gibbs Racing | Toyota | 46 | 31 | Running |
| 7 | 3 | 17 | Cole Custer (i) | SS-Green Light Racing with Rick Ware Racing | Chevrolet | 46 | 0 | Running |
| 8 | 5 | 31 | Tyler Reddick (i) | Jordan Anderson Racing | Chevrolet | 46 | 0 | Running |
| 9 | 6 | 11 | Justin Haley | Kaulig Racing | Chevrolet | 46 | 38 | Running |
| 10 | 11 | 10 | Jeb Burton | Kaulig Racing | Chevrolet | 46 | 27 | Running |
| 11 | 35 | 1 | Michael Annett | JR Motorsports | Chevrolet | 46 | 35 | Running |
| 12 | 21 | 02 | Brett Moffitt | Our Motorsports | Chevrolet | 46 | 25 | Running |
| 13 | 17 | 77 | Austin Dillon | Bassett Racing (i) | Chevrolet | 46 | 0 | Running |
| 14 | 22 | 91 | Preston Pardus | DGM Racing | Chevrolet | 46 | 23 | Running |
| 15 | 18 | 48 | Jade Buford | Big Machine Racing Team | Chevrolet | 46 | 30 | Running |
| 16 | 29 | 98 | Riley Herbst | Stewart-Haas Racing | Ford | 46 | 21 | Running |
| 17 | 19 | 19 | Brandon Jones | Joe Gibbs Racing | Toyota | 46 | 28 | Running |
| 18 | 13 | 23 | Andy Lally | Our Motorsports | Chevrolet | 46 | 26 | Running |
| 19 | 16 | 6 | Spencer Pumpelly | JD Motorsports | Chevrolet | 46 | 18 | Running |
| 20 | 4 | 36 | Alex Labbé | DGM Racing | Chevrolet | 46 | 17 | Running |
| 21 | 23 | 2 | Myatt Snider | Richard Childress Racing | Chevrolet | 46 | 16 | Running |
| 22 | 30 | 4 | Landon Cassill | JD Motorsports | Chevrolet | 46 | 15 | Running |
| 23 | 33 | 51 | Jeremy Clements | Jeremy Clements Racing | Chevrolet | 46 | 25 | Running |
| 24 | 31 | 99 | Ryan Ellis | B. J. McLeod Motorsports | Toyota | 46 | 13 | Running |
| 25 | 34 | 39 | Ryan Sieg | RSS Racing | Ford | 46 | 12 | Running |
| 26 | 14 | 68 | Brandon Brown | Brandonbilt Motorsports | Chevrolet | 46 | 11 | Running |
| 27 | 25 | 52 | Gray Gaulding | Means Motorsports | Chevrolet | 46 | 10 | Running |
| 28 | 27 | 15 | Colby Howard | JD Motorsports | Chevrolet | 46 | 10 | Running |
| 29 | 26 | 18 | Daniel Hemric | Joe Gibbs Racing | Toyota | 46 | 8 | Running |
| 30 | 2 | 07 | Ross Chastain (i) | SS-Green Light Racing | Chevrolet | 36 | 0 | Running |
| 31 | 24 | 13 | Boris Said | MBM Motorsports | Toyota | 35 | 6 | Running |
| 32 | 36 | 26 | Kris Wright (i) | Sam Hunt Racing | Toyota | 29 | 0 | Engine |
| 33 | 28 | 66 | Timmy Hill (i) | MBM Motorsports | Toyota | 29 | 0 | Engine |
| 34 | 15 | 8 | Miguel Paludo | JR Motorsports | Chevrolet | 25 | 4 | Rear Gear |
| 35 | 32 | 44 | Tommy Joe Martins | Martins Motorsports | Chevrolet | 19 | 2 | Engine |
| 36 | 20 | 9 | Noah Gragson | JR Motorsports | Chevrolet | 13 | 1 | Engine |
Official race results

=== Race statistics ===
- Lead changes: 6 among 5 different drivers
- Cautions/Laps: 4 for 7
- Time of race: 2 hours, 9 minutes, and 25 seconds
- Average speed: 72.723 mph (117.036 km/h)

| Previous race: 2021 Drydene 200 | NASCAR Xfinity Series; 2021 season | Next race: 2021 Alsco Uniforms 300 (Charlotte) |
