= 2024 TCR Brazil Touring Car Championship =

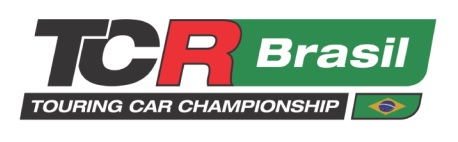
Official Logo

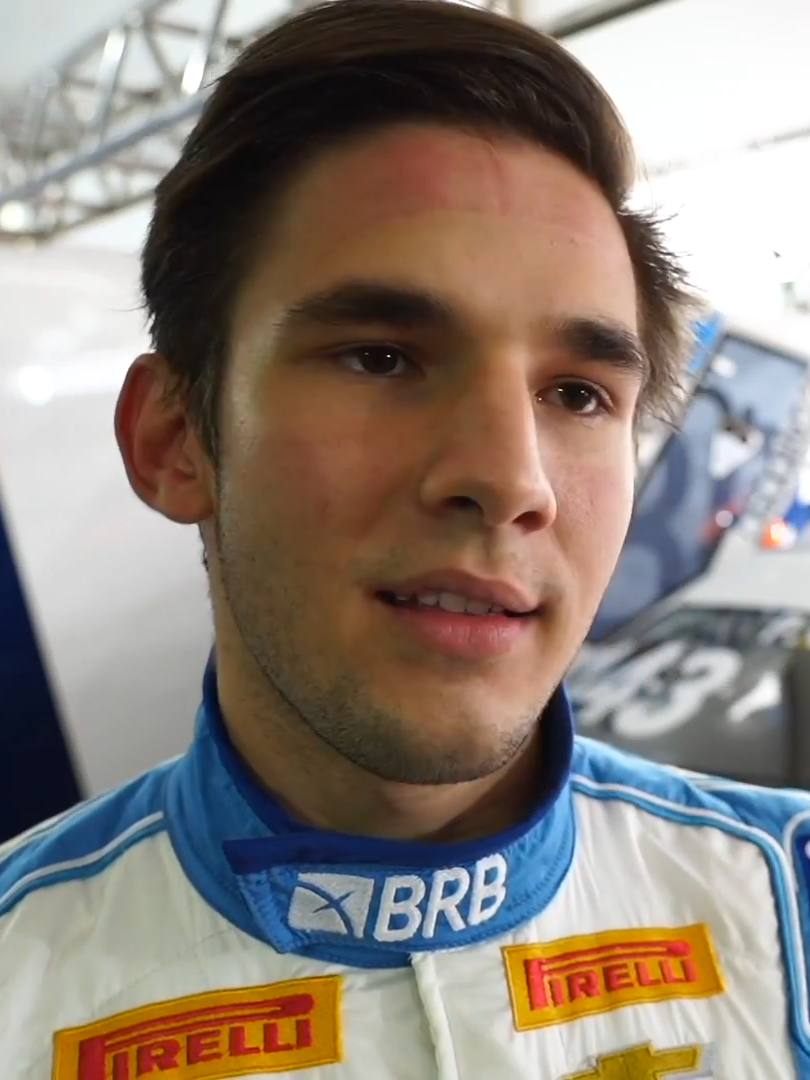
Pedro Cardoso became champion without winning a single race

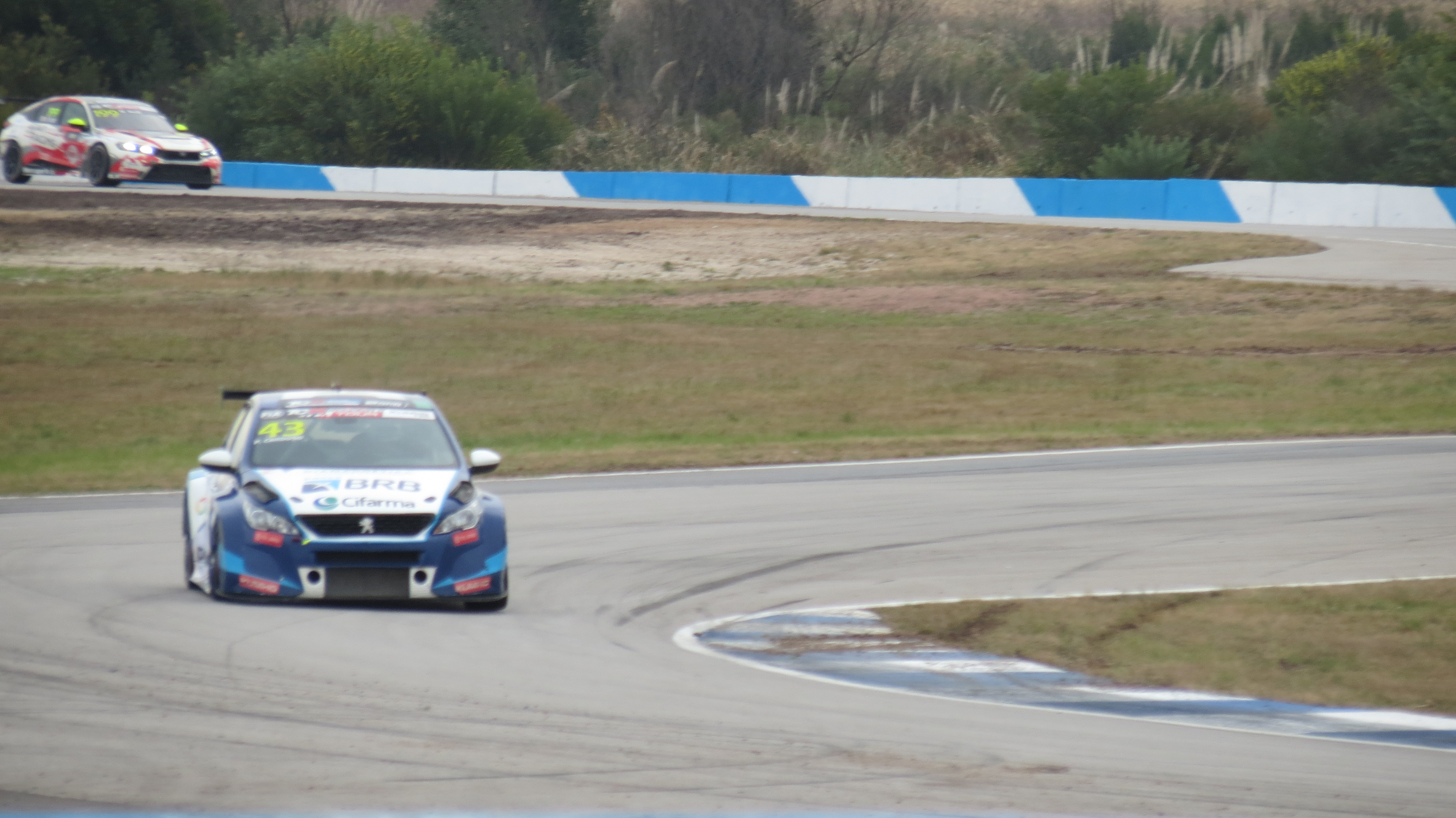
Champion Pedro Cardoso in action

The 2024 TCR Brazil Touring Car Championship was the second season of TCR Brazil Touring Car Championship.

Pedro Cardoso won the drivers' championship, finishing three times ahead of Juan Ángel Rosso.

== Calendar ==
Race is an Endurance Event

Rnd.	Circuit/Location	Date
1	(Brazil) Interlagos Circuit, São Paulo	12–14 April
2	(Brazil) Autódromo Internacional de Cascavel, Cascavel	23–24 May
3	(Brazil) Autódromo Internacional de Cascavel, Cascavel	25–26 May
4	(Brazil) Autódromo Velo Città, Mogi Guaçu	14–16 June
5	(Brazil) Interlagos Circuit, São Paulo	19–21 July
6	(Argentina) Autódromo Oscar y Juan Gálvez, Buenos Aires	4–6 October

== Teams and drivers ==
Team	Car	No.	Drivers	Class	Rounds	Co-Driver name	Rounds
(Brazil) Cobra Racing Team	Toyota GR Corolla Sport TCR	07	(Brazil) Thiago Vivacqua		All	(Brazil) Nicolas Costa	1
(Brazil) Cobra Racing Team	Toyota GR Corolla Sport TCR	47	(Argentina) Norberto Fontana		1	(Brazil) Felipe Maluhy	1
(Brazil) / W2 Shell V-Power (Note: Car No. 28 entered as "W2 Shell V-Power". Car No. 2, No. 37, No. 77 and No. 85 entered as "W2 ProGP".); (Brazil) / W2 ProGP	Cupra León Competición TCR	2	(Brazil) Marcio Basso	T	6	—N/a	
(Brazil) / W2 Shell V-Power; (Brazil) / W2 ProGP	Cupra León Competición TCR	37	(Brazil) Guilherme Reischl	T	1–5	(Brazil) Guilherme Salas	1
(Brazil) / W2 Shell V-Power; (Brazil) / W2 ProGP	Cupra León Competición TCR	28	(Brazil) Galid Osman		1	(Brazil) Felipe Lapenna	1
(Brazil) / W2 Shell V-Power; (Brazil) / W2 ProGP	Cupra León VZ TCR	28	(Brazil) Galid Osman		2–6	—N/a	
(Brazil) / W2 Shell V-Power; (Brazil) / W2 ProGP	Cupra León VZ TCR	77	(Brazil) Raphael Reis		All	(Brazil) Lucas Foresti	1
(Argentina) Squadra Martino	Honda Civic Type R TCR (FK8)	3	(Brazil) Rodrigo Baptista		1–4	(Brazil) Diego Nunes	1
(Argentina) Squadra Martino	Honda Civic Type R TCR (FK8)	9	(Brazil) Nelson Piquet Jr.		5	—N/a	
(Argentina) Squadra Martino	Honda Civic Type R TCR (FK8)	15	(Uruguay) Enrique Maglione	T	All	(Uruguay) Rodrigo Aramendia	1
(Argentina) Squadra Martino	Honda Civic Type R TCR (FK8)	34	(Brazil) Fabio Casagrande	T	All	(Argentina) Franco Coscia	1
(Argentina) Squadra Martino	Honda Civic Type R TCR (FL5)	60	(Uruguay) Juan Manuel Casella		All	(Argentina) Ignacio Montenegro	1
(Argentina) Paladini Racing	Toyota GR Corolla Sport TCR	5	(Argentina) Fabián Yannantuoni		1–5	(Spain) Enric Bordás Cotes	1
(Argentina) Paladini Racing	Toyota GR Corolla Sport TCR	16	(Argentina) Juan Ángel Rosso		All	(Argentina) Facundo Marques	1
(Argentina) PMO Racing	Peugeot 308 TCR	8	(Brazil) Rafael Suzuki		4–6	—N/a	
(Argentina) PMO Racing	Peugeot 308 TCR	27	(Brazil) Marcos Regadas	T	2–4, 5	—N/a	
(Argentina) PMO Racing	Peugeot 308 TCR	88	(Brazil) Werner Neugebauer		1	(Brazil) Caca Bueno	1
(Brazil) BRB Banco de Brasília by PMO Racing	Peugeot 308 TCR	43	(Brazil) Pedro Cardoso		All	(Brazil) Celso Neto	1
Toyota Team Argentina	Toyota GR Corolla Sport TCR	17	(Argentina) Matías Rossi		2–6	—N/a	
(Uruguay) PMO – Full Time Sports	Lynk & Co 03 TCR	27	(Brazil) Marcos Regadas	T	1	(Brazil) Rafael Suzuki	1
(Uruguay) PMO – Full Time Sports	Lynk & Co 03 TCR	55	(Brazil) Lucas Fecury		1	(Brazil) Arthur Leist	1

Icon	Class
T	Eligible for TCR Trophy

== Results ==
=== Season summary ===
Rnd.		Circuit	Pole position	Fastest lap	Winning driver	Winning team	Winning Trophy driver	Info
1	1	(Brazil) Interlagos Circuit	(Uruguay) Juan Manuel Casella (Argentina) Ignacio Montenegro	(Brazil) Raphael Reis (Brazil) Lucas Foresti	(Brazil) Raphael Reis (Brazil) Lucas Foresti	(Brazil) W2 ProGP	(Brazil) Guilherme Reischl (Brazil) Guilherme Salas	
2	2	(Brazil) Autódromo Internacional de Cascavel	(Brazil) Galid Osman	(Argentina) Matías Rossi	(Brazil) Galid Osman	(Brazil) W2 ProGP	(Brazil) Marcos Regadas	
2	3	(Brazil) Autódromo Internacional de Cascavel		(Argentina) Matías Rossi	(Argentina) Juan Ángel Rosso	(Argentina) Paladini Racing	(Brazil) Marcos Regadas	
3	4	(Brazil) Autódromo Internacional de Cascavel	(Brazil) Rodrigo Baptista	(Brazil) Rodrigo Baptista	(Brazil) Rodrigo Baptista	(Argentina) Squadra Martino	(Brazil) Fabio Casagrande	
3	5	(Brazil) Autódromo Internacional de Cascavel		(Argentina) Fabián Yannantuoni	(Argentina) Fabián Yannantuoni	(Argentina) Paladini Racing	(Brazil) Fabio Casagrande	
4	6	(Brazil) Autódromo Velo Città	(Brazil) Pedro Cardoso	(Argentina) Matías Rossi	(Argentina) Matías Rossi	Toyota Gazoo Racing Argentina	(Brazil) Marcos Regadas	
4	7	(Brazil) Autódromo Velo Città		(Brazil) Rafael Suzuki	(Brazil) Rafael Suzuki	(Argentina) PMO Racing	(Brazil) Marcos Regadas	
5	8	(Brazil) Interlagos Circuit	(Brazil) Raphael Reis	(Brazil) Rafael Suzuki	(Brazil) Rafael Suzuki	(Argentina) PMO Racing	(Brazil) Guilherme Reischl	
5	9	(Brazil) Interlagos Circuit		(Brazil) Nelson Piquet Jr.	(Brazil) Rafael Suzuki	(Argentina) PMO Racing	(Uruguay) Enrique Maglione	
6	10	(Argentina) Autódromo Oscar y Juan Gálvez	(Uruguay) Juan Manuel Casella	(Brazil) Raphael Reis	(Brazil) Galid Osman	(Brazil) W2 ProGP	(Brazil) Marcos Regadas	
6	11	(Argentina) Autódromo Oscar y Juan Gálvez		(Uruguay) Juan Manuel Casella	(Uruguay) Juan Manuel Casella	(Argentina) Squadra Martino	(Uruguay) Enrique Maglione	

== Championship standings ==
Scoring system

Position	1st	2nd	3rd	4th	5th	6th	7th	8th	9th	10th	11th	12th	13th	14th	15th
Qualifying	10	7	5	4	3	2	1	—N/a							
Endurance	40	35	30	27	24	21	18	15	13	11	9	7	5	3	1
Races 2–5	35	30	27	24	21	18	15	13	11	9	7	5	3	2	1

=== Drivers' championship ===
Pos.	Driver	INT (Brazil)	CAS (Brazil)		CAS (Brazil)		VEL (Brazil)		INT (Brazil)		BUE (Argentina)		Points
Pos.	Driver	EDC	RD1	RD2	RD1	RD2	RD1	RD2	RD1	RD2	RD1	RD2	Points
1	(Brazil) Pedro Cardoso	2^{5}	3^{2}	6	3^{6}	Ret	3^{1}	5	5^{4}	7	4^{2}	2	274
2	(Argentina) Juan Ángel Rosso	3^{6}	11^{5}	1	10^{7}	11	12	10	9^{3}	DNS	2^{5}	3	271
3	(Brazil) Raphael Reis	1^{2}	5^{3}	4	6^{5}	10	7^{5}	2	7^{1}	2	11^{4}	5	248
4	(Argentina) Matías Rossi		2^{4}	3	12^{3}	3	1^{3}	4	10	Ret	8^{3}	4	231
5	(Brazil) Galid Osman	10†^{3}	1^{1}	8	2^{2}	Ret	2^{4}	6	Ret^{6}	Ret	1^{7}	8	230
6	(Uruguay) Juan Manuel Casella	DSQ^{1}	4	7	5^{4}	4	6^{7}	8	6	Ret	3^{1}	1	228
7	(Brazil) Rafael Suzuki	11†^{7}					9^{6}	1	1^{2}	1	6^{6}	6	186
8	(Brazil) Rodrigo Baptista	Ret^{4}	6^{6}	5	1^{1}	5	5^{2}	Ret					158
9	(Argentina) Fabián Yannantuoni	9†	9	11	7	1	Ret	INF	4^{5}	3			142
10	(Brazil) Thiago Vivacqua	4	8^{7}	2	8	6	13†	Ret	8	Ret	12	10	141
11	(Uruguay) Enrique Maglione	Ret	10	10	11	8	10	9	Ret	4	9	7	117
12	(Brazil) Marcos Regadas	11†^{7}	7	9	Ret	9	8	7	Ret	DNS	5	11	104
13	(Brazil) Guilherme Reischl	7	11	12	10	11†	12	10	9	DNS			93
14	(Brazil) Fabio Casagrande	Ret	DNQ	DNS	9	7	11	11†	Ret	5	10	9	91
15	(Brazil) Nelson Piquet Jr.								2^{7}	8†			48
16	(Brazil) Lucas Foresti	1^{2}											47
17	(Brazil) Celso Neto	2^{5}											38
18	(Brazil) Guilherme Salas	3											30
19	(Brazil) Nicolas Costa	4											27
20	(Brazil) Lucas Fecury	5											24
21	(Brazil) Arthur Leist	5											24
22	(Argentina) Norberto Fontana	6											21
23	(Brazil) Felipe Maluhy	6											21
24	(Argentina) Facundo Marques	7^{6}											20
25	(Brazil) Márcio Basso										7	Ret	19
26	(Brazil) Werner Neugebauer	8											15
27	(Brazil) Cacá Bueno	8											15
28	(Brazil) Felipe Lapenna	10†^{3}											14
29	(Spain) Enric Bordás Cotes	9†											13
30	(Argentina) Ignacio Montenegro	DSQ^{1}											10
31	(Brazil) Diego Nunes	Ret^{4}											4
NC	(Argentina) Franco Coscia	Ret											0
NC	(Uruguay) Rodrigo Aramendia	Ret											0
Pos.	Driver	INT (Brazil)	CAS (Brazil)		CAS (Brazil)		VEL (Brazil)		INT (Brazil)		BUE (Argentina)		Points

Colour	Result
Gold	Winner
Silver	Second place
Bronze	Third place
Green	Points classification
Blue	Non-points classification
Blue	Non-classified finish (NC)
Purple	Retired, not classified (Ret)
Red	Did not qualify (DNQ)
Red	Did not pre-qualify (DNPQ)
Black	Disqualified (DSQ)
White	Did not start (DNS)
White	Withdrew (WD)
White	Race cancelled (C)
Blank	Did not practice (DNP)
Blank	Did not arrive (DNA)
Blank	Excluded (EX)

^{1} ^{2} ^{3} ^{4} ^{5} ^{6} ^{7} – Points-scoring position in qualifying.

† – Drivers did not finish the race, but were classified as they completed over 75% of the race distance.

=== Trophy Cup ===
Pos.	Driver	INT (Brazil)	CAS (Brazil)		CAS (Brazil)		VEL (Brazil)		INT (Brazil)		BUE (Argentina)		Points
Pos.	Driver	EDC	RD1	RD2	RD1	RD2	RD1	RD2	RD1	RD2	RD1	RD2	Points
1	(Uruguay) Enrique Maglione	Ret^{3}	2^{1}	2	3^{1}	2	2^{2}	2	Ret^{2}	1	3^{2}	1	329
2	(Brazil) Marcos Regadas	2†^{1}	1^{2}	1	Ret^{4}	3	1^{1}	1	Ret^{1}	DNS	1^{1}	3	321
3	(Brazil) Fabio Casagrande	Ret^{4}			1^{3}	1	3^{3}	4†	Ret^{3}	2	4^{4}	2	260
4	(Brazil) Guilherme Reischl	1^{2}	3^{3}	3	2^{2}	4†	4^{4}	3	1^{1}	DNS			255
5	(Brazil) Guilherme Salas	1^{2}											40
6	(Brazil) Rafael Suzuki	2†^{1}											35
7	(Brazil) Márcio Basso										2^{3}	Ret	34
NC	(Argentina) Franco Coscia	Ret^{4}											0
NC	(Uruguay) Rodrigo Aramendia	Ret^{3}											0
Pos.	Driver	INT (Brazil)	CAS (Brazil)		CAS (Brazil)		VEL (Brazil)		INT (Brazil)		BUE (Argentina)		Points

=== Teams' championship ===
Best 2 (two) results from each team are counted for teams' championship.

Pos.	Team	N.°	INT (Brazil)	CAS (Brazil)		CAS (Brazil)		VEL (Brazil)		INT (Brazil)		BUE (Argentina)		Points
Pos.	Team	N.°	EDC	RD1	RD2	RD1	RD2	RD1	RD2	RD1	RD2	RD1	RD2	Points
1	(Argentina) PMO Racing	8						9^{6}	1	1^{2}	1	6^{6}	6	521
1	(Argentina) PMO Racing	27		7	9	Ret	9	8	7	Ret	DNS	5	11	521
1	(Argentina) PMO Racing	88	8											521
2	(Brazil) W2 ProGP	2										7	Ret	505
2	(Brazil) W2 ProGP	28	10†^{3}	1^{1}	8	2^{2}	Ret	2^{4}	6	Ret^{6}	Ret	1^{7}	8	505
2	(Brazil) W2 ProGP	37	7	11	12	10	11†	12	10	9	DNS			505
2	(Brazil) W2 ProGP	77	1^{2}	5^{3}	4	6^{5}	10	7^{5}	2	7^{1}	2	11^{4}	5	505
3	(Argentina) Squadra Martino	3	Ret^{4}	6^{6}	5	1^{1}	5	5^{2}	Ret					480
3	(Argentina) Squadra Martino	9								2^{7}	8†			480
3	(Argentina) Squadra Martino	15	Ret	10	10	11	8	10	9	Ret	4	9	7	480
3	(Argentina) Squadra Martino	34	Ret	DNQ	DNS	9	7	11	11†	Ret	5	10	9	480
3	(Argentina) Squadra Martino	60	DSQ^{1}	4	7	5^{4}	4	6^{7}	8	6	Ret	3^{1}	1	480
4	(Argentina) Paladini Racing	5	9†	9	11	7	1	Ret	INF	4^{5}	3			431
4	(Argentina) Paladini Racing	16	3^{6}	11^{5}	1	10^{7}	11	12	10	9^{3}	DNS	2^{5}	3	431
5	(Brazil) BRB Banco de Brasília by PMO Racing	43	2^{5}	3^{2}	6	3^{6}	Ret	3^{1}	5	5^{4}	7	4^{2}	2	274
6	Toyota Team Argentina	17		2^{4}	3	12^{3}	3	1^{3}	4	10	Ret	8^{3}	4	231
7	(Brazil) Cobra Racing	07	4	8^{7}	2	8	6	13†	Ret	8	Ret	12	10	141
7	(Brazil) Cobra Racing	47	6											141
8	(Uruguay) PMO – Full Time Sports	27	11†^{7}											36
8	(Uruguay) PMO – Full Time Sports	55	5											36
Pos.	Team	N.°	INT (Brazil)	CAS (Brazil)		CAS (Brazil)		VEL (Brazil)		INT (Brazil)		BUE (Argentina)		Points

== See also ==
- List of TCR Series
- Production car racing
- Stock car racing
- Stock Car Pro Series
- SuperBike Brasil
- Moto 1000 GP
