= TCR Brasil Touring Car Championship =

Touring car series based in Brazil

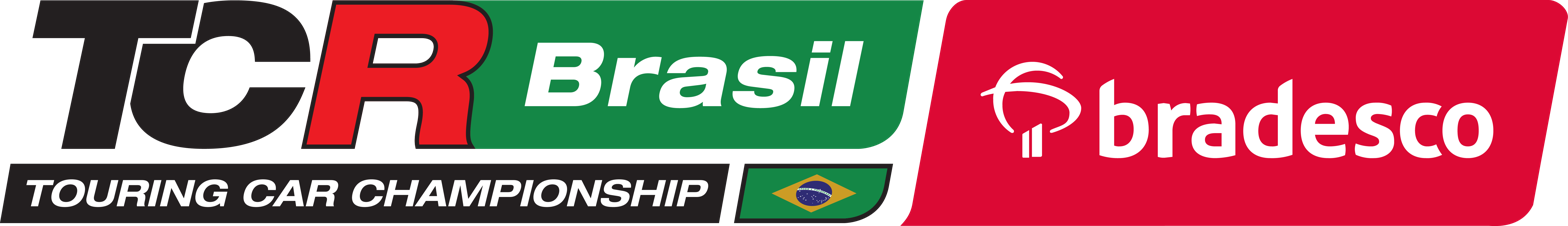
- Category: Touring cars
- Country: Argentina; Brazil; Uruguay
- Inaugural season: 2023
- Drivers: 14
- Teams: 7
- Constructors: 6
- Tyre suppliers: K Kumho
- Drivers' champion: (Brazil) Nelson Piquet Jr.
- Teams' champion: (Argentina) Honda YPF Racing

The TCR Brasil Touring Car Championship (due to sponsorship reasons, officially known as the Bradesco TCR Brasil Touring Car Championship, short TCR BR) is a touring car racing series based in Brazil first held in 2023, which uses the TCR Touring Car regulations.

Announced in 2020, TCR South America held its first season the following year. Since then, the series has alternated races in Argentina, Uruguay, and Brazil.

== Champions ==
| Drivers' Champions | | | | Teams' Champions | | Info |
| Year | Driver | Team | Car | Team | Car | # |
|---|---|---|---|---|---|---|
| 2023 | (Brazil) Galid Osman | (Brazil) W2 ProGP | Cupra León Competición TCR | (Brazil) W2 ProGP | Cupra León Competición TCR | |
| 2024 | (Brazil) Pedro Cardoso | (Brazil) BRB by PMO Racing | Peugeot 308 TCR | (Argentina) PMO Racing | Peugeot 308 TCR | |
| 2025 | (Brazil) Nelson Piquet Jr. | (Argentina) Honda YPF Racing | Honda Civic Type R TCR (FL5) | (Argentina) Honda YPF Racing | Honda Civic Type R TCR (FL5) | |
| 2026 | (Argentina) Leonel Pernía | (Japan) Honda Racing | Honda Civic Type R TCR (FL5) | (Japan) Honda Racing | Honda Civic Type R TCR (FL5) | |

== Circuits ==
- **Bold** denotes a circuit was used in the 2026 season.

| Number | Circuits | Rounds | Years |
|---|---|---|---|
| 1 | (Brazil) **Autódromo José Carlos Pace** | 5 (Note: Interlagos Circuit hosted 2 rounds in 2024.) | 2023–present |
| 2 | (Brazil) **Autódromo Velo Città** | 4 | 2023–present |
| 3 | (Brazil) **Autódromo Internacional de Cascavel** | 3 | 2023–2024, 2026 |
| 4 | (Brazil) **Circuito dos Cristais** | 2 | 2025–present |
| 4 | (Brazil) **Autódromo Internacional de Mato Grosso** | 2 | 2025–present |
| 6 | (Uruguay) Autódromo Eduardo Prudêncio Cabrera | 1 | 2023 |
| 6 | (Brazil) Velopark | 1 | 2023 |
| 6 | (Argentina) Autódromo Oscar y Juan Gálvez | 1 | 2024 |

== See also ==
- List of TCR Series
- Brasileiro de Marcas
- Campeonato Brasileiro de Marcas e Pilotos
- Stock Car Pro Series
