= Marçal Müller =

Brazilian racing driver (born 1992)

- Nationality: Brazilian
- Born: 12 November 1992 (age 33) Nova Hartz, Brazil

Marçal Müller (born 12 November 1991) is a Brazilian racing driver who compete in Porsche Cup Brasil. He has five championship titles between Porsche Carrera Cup Sprint and Endurance championships.

== Complete Stock Car Pro Series results ==
(key) (Races in bold indicate pole position) (Races in italics indicate fastest lap)

Year	Team	Car	1	2	3	4	5	6	7	8	9	10	11	12	13	14	15	16	17	18	19	20	21	22	23	Rank	Points
2022	Lubrax Podium	Chevrolet Cruze	INT; 1; 9	GOI; 1	GOI; 2	RIO; 1	RIO; 2	VCA; 1	VCA; 2	BRA; 1	BRA; 2	BRA; 1	BRA; 2	INT; 1	INT; 2	SCZ; 1	SCZ; 2	VCA; 1	VCA; 2	GOI; 1	GOI; 2	GOI; 1	GOI; 2	BRA; 1	BRA; 2	NC†	0

^{†} As Muller was a guest driver, he was ineligible for points.
