= Miguel Paludo =

Brazilian racing driver (born 1983)

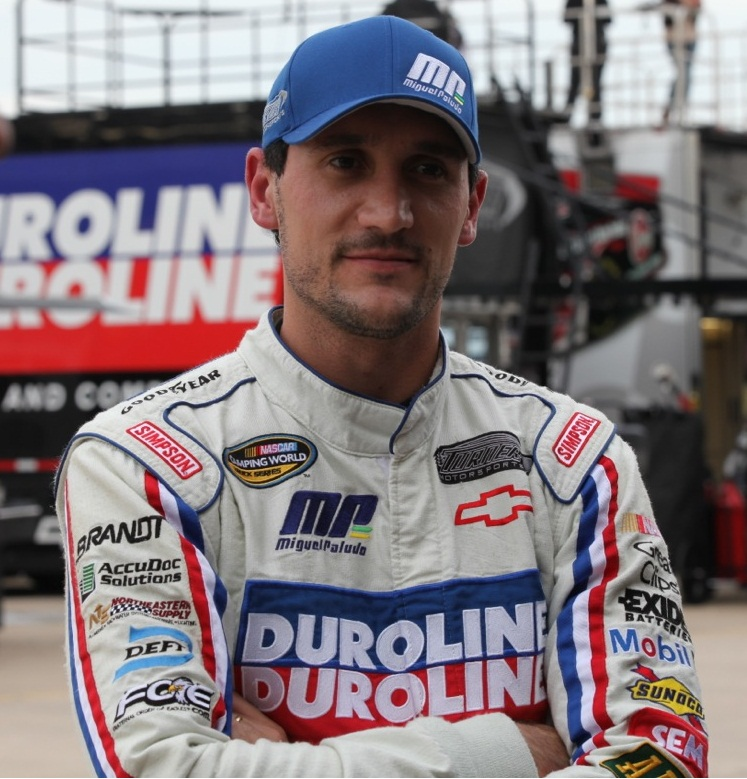
- Paludo in 2012
- Born: July 26, 1983 (age 43); Nova Prata, Rio Grande do Sul, Brazil
- Achievements: 2008, 2009, 2017, 2020, 2021, 2025 Porsche GT3 Cup Brasil Champion

NASCAR O'Reilly Auto Parts Series career
- 11 races run over 4 years
- 2023 position: 45th
- Best finish: 45th (2023)
- First race: 2012 Sargento 200 (Road America)
- Last race: 2023 Pennzoil 150 (Indianapolis G.P.)
| Wins | Top tens | Poles |
|---|---|---|
| 0 | 2 | 0 |

NASCAR FedEx Freight Truck Series career
- 73 races run over 4 years
- 2013 position: 9th
- Best finish: 9th (2013)
- First race: 2010 O'Reilly 200 (Bristol)
- Last race: 2013 Ford EcoBoost 200 (Homestead)
| Wins | Top tens | Poles |
|---|---|---|
| 0 | 25 | 1 |
- Statistics up to date as of December 27, 2023.

Miguel Paludo (born July 26, 1983) is a Brazilian professional racing driver who competes full-time in the Porsche GT3 Carrera Cup Series. Paludo formerly competed in NASCAR full-time in the Camping World Truck Series, driving for Red Horse Racing and Turner Scott Motorsports. He has won four championships in the Porsche GT3 Cup Series, with three (2008, 2009, and 2020) in the Carrera Cup and the other (2017) in the Endurance Series.

== Racing career ==
=== Early career ===
Paludo began racing go karts at the age of 14, and in 2004, moved up to touring car racing in a regional Brazilian series, competing for his family-owned team with his brother Daniel. He competed for several years in regional and national series in Brazil, most successfully in the Porsche GT3 Cup Brasil, where he won back-to-back series championships in 2008 and 2009.

=== 2010–2013 and 2021–present: NASCAR ===
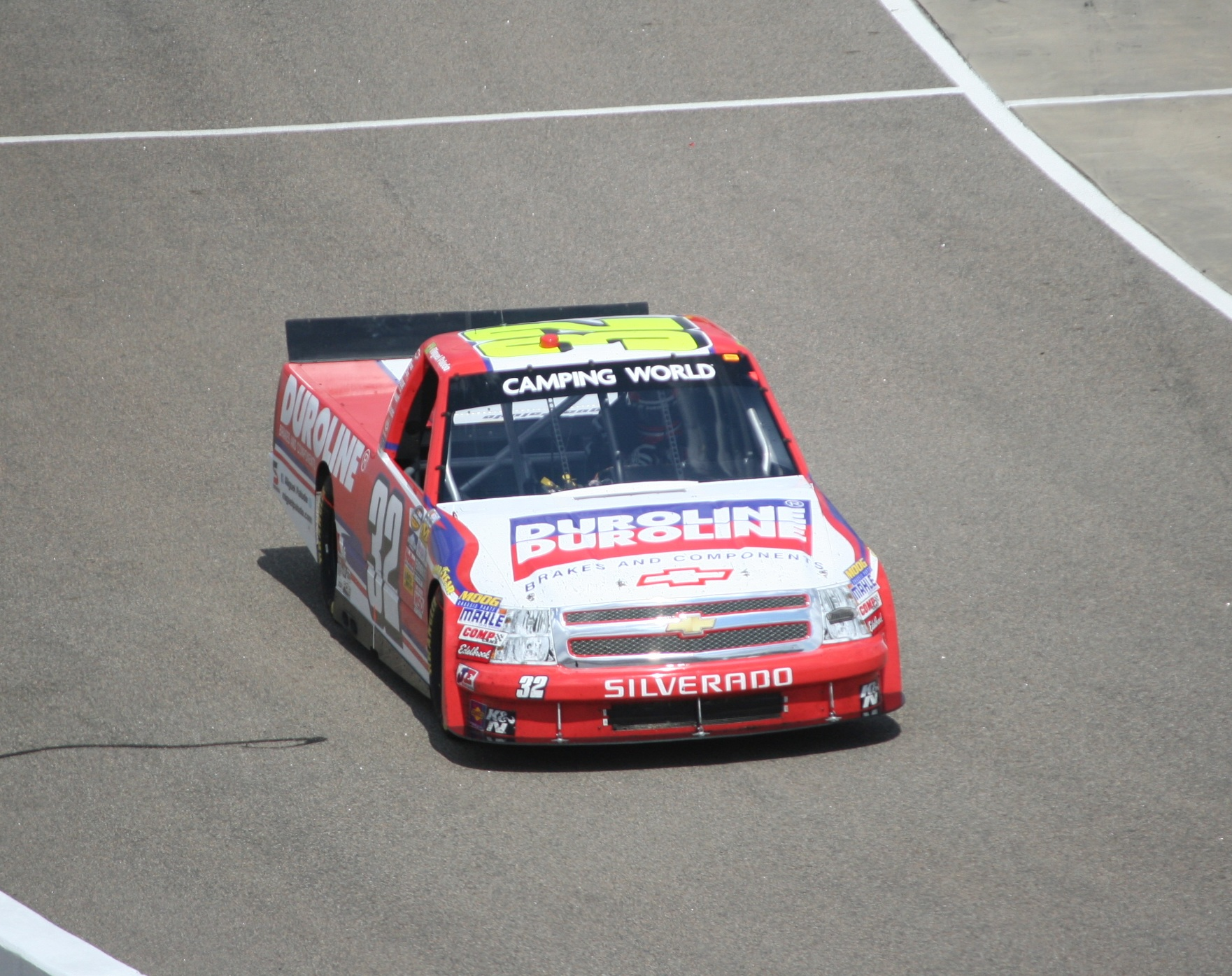
Paludo at Rockingham in 2012.

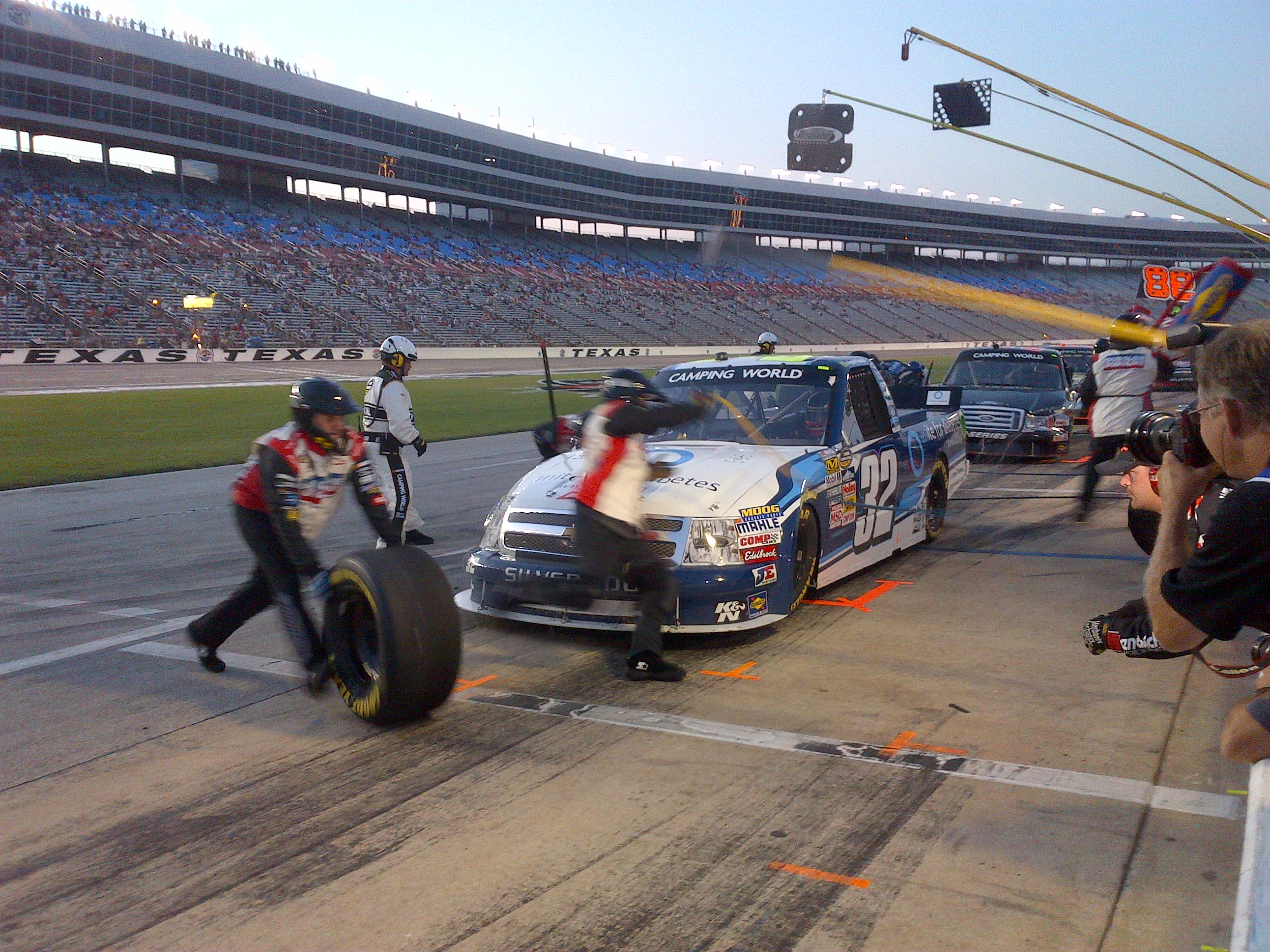
Paludo making a pit stop at Texas in 2012.

Paludo began his NASCAR career in 2010, competing in the K&N Pro Series East in a car fielded by Hattori Racing Enterprises. He finished fifteenth in the series standings that year, with a best finish of fourth. He also made his debut in the Camping World Truck Series, competing for Germain Racing and Red Horse Racing in four races. He finished ninth in his first race in the series, at Bristol Motor Speedway, widely regarded as a difficult track for rookie drivers.

In 2011, Paludo ran full-time in the Camping World Truck Series for Red Horse Racing, with a best finish of third; he ended the season finishing seventeenth in the points standings and fourth in the series' Rookie-of-the-Year competition.

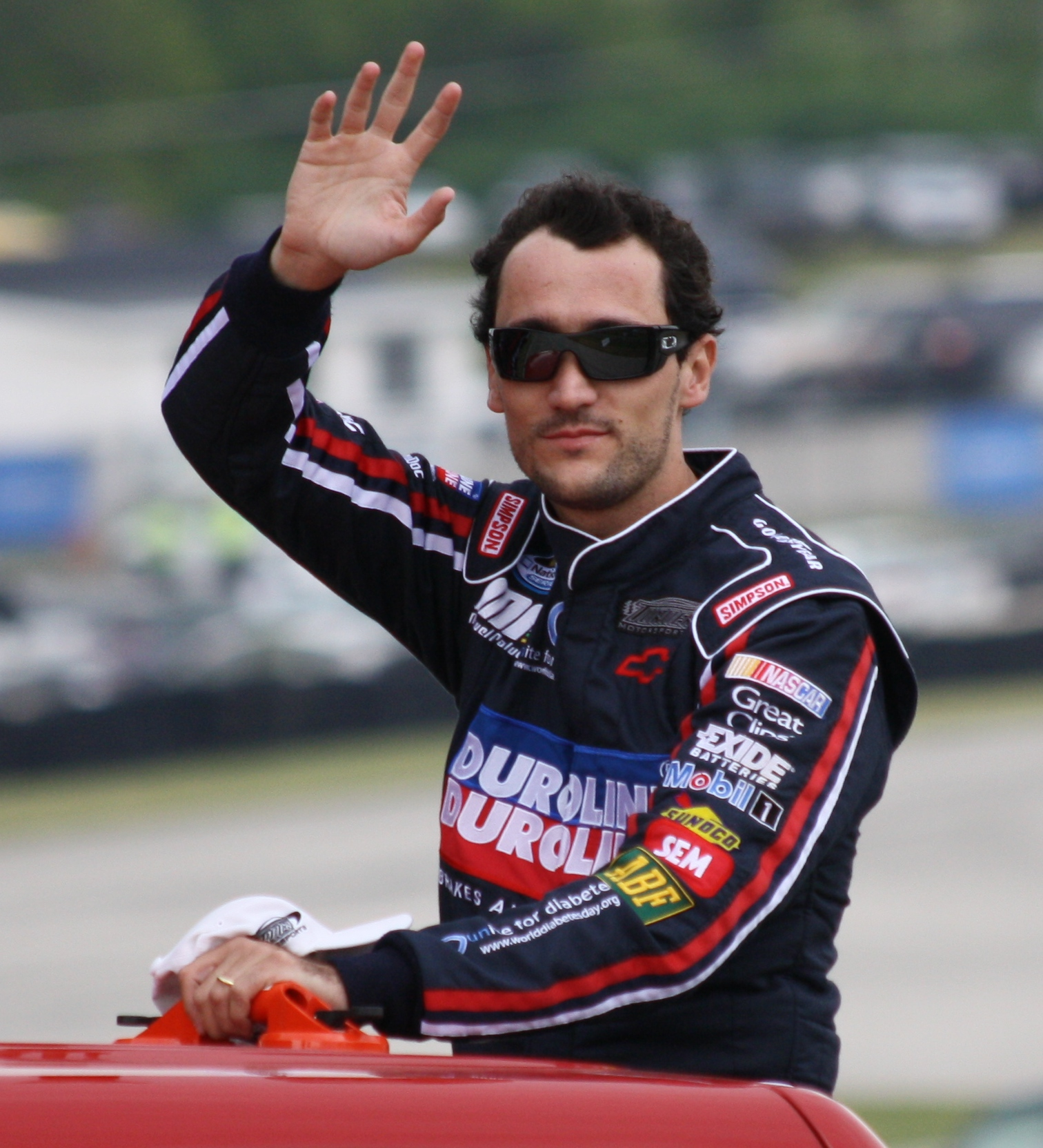
Paludo during driver intros at Road America in 2012

Following the end of the 2011 season, Paludo left Red Horse Racing to drive for Turner Scott Motorsports in the No. 32 truck with teammates James Buescher and Nelson Piquet Jr., another Brazilian driver. Paludo started the season with a pole in the season-opener at Daytona International Speedway, where he was the first Brazilian to win a pole in one of NASCAR's top-three series, and alongside Piquet Jr., comprised the first all-Brazilian front row in the history of NASCAR. However, during the race, Paludo suffered a very violent crash when his truck lost control and crashed hard into the inside frontstretch wall. The impact sent his truck spinning in circles and it flew through the air while also catching on fire. Paludo walked away from the crash unhurt. Paludo's best finish of the season (fifth) came in the season finale at Homestead-Miami Speedway, and he ultimately finished tenth in the NCWTS driver point standings, his best points position to date. Additionally, Paludo ran two NASCAR Nationwide Series races in 2012, competing at Road America and Watkins Glen International, in the latter of which he earned his best NNS finish of 13th.

In 2013, Paludo returned to the No. 32 Chevrolet Silverado with Turner Scott Motorsports for another complete NCWTS season. At Talladega Superspeedway in October, Paludo was involved in a spectacular last-lap accident, his truck being flipped in the trioval.

Following the 2013 season, Paludo was released by Turner Scott Motorsports due to a lack of sponsorship. He was unable to find another ride in NASCAR for 2014.

In 2021, Paludo would return to NASCAR and the Xfinity Series (previously Nationwide) and would drive the No. 8 JR Motorsports in three road course races (the Daytona Road Course, Circuit of the Americas and Mid-Ohio) during the first half of the season, replacing Josh Berry, the car's driver for the first half of the season. JRM had announced months earlier that Sam Mayer would be driving the No. 8 car during the second half of the season, which was why Paludo was not given the car for all seven road course races on the schedule. The deal came about through BRANDT, Paludo's sponsor in Brazil, which was also the primary sponsor of JRM's No. 7 car of Justin Allgaier. Allgaier and Paludo were teammates at Turner Scott Motorsports from 2011 to 2013, and BRANDT was Allgaier's primary sponsor there as well, and in addition to that, they sponsored Paludo in one Truck race. Paludo would return to JR Motorsports for the same three events in 2022.

=== 2014–present: Sports car racing ===
After Paludo ended up not running any NASCAR races during the 2014 season, he moved back to Brazil in 2015 and began racing in the Porsche GT3 Cup Series again. He would also compete in and win one championship in both the Porsche Endurance Series as well as the Carrera Cup, giving him a total of four titles in the series across all of its divisions.

== Personal life ==
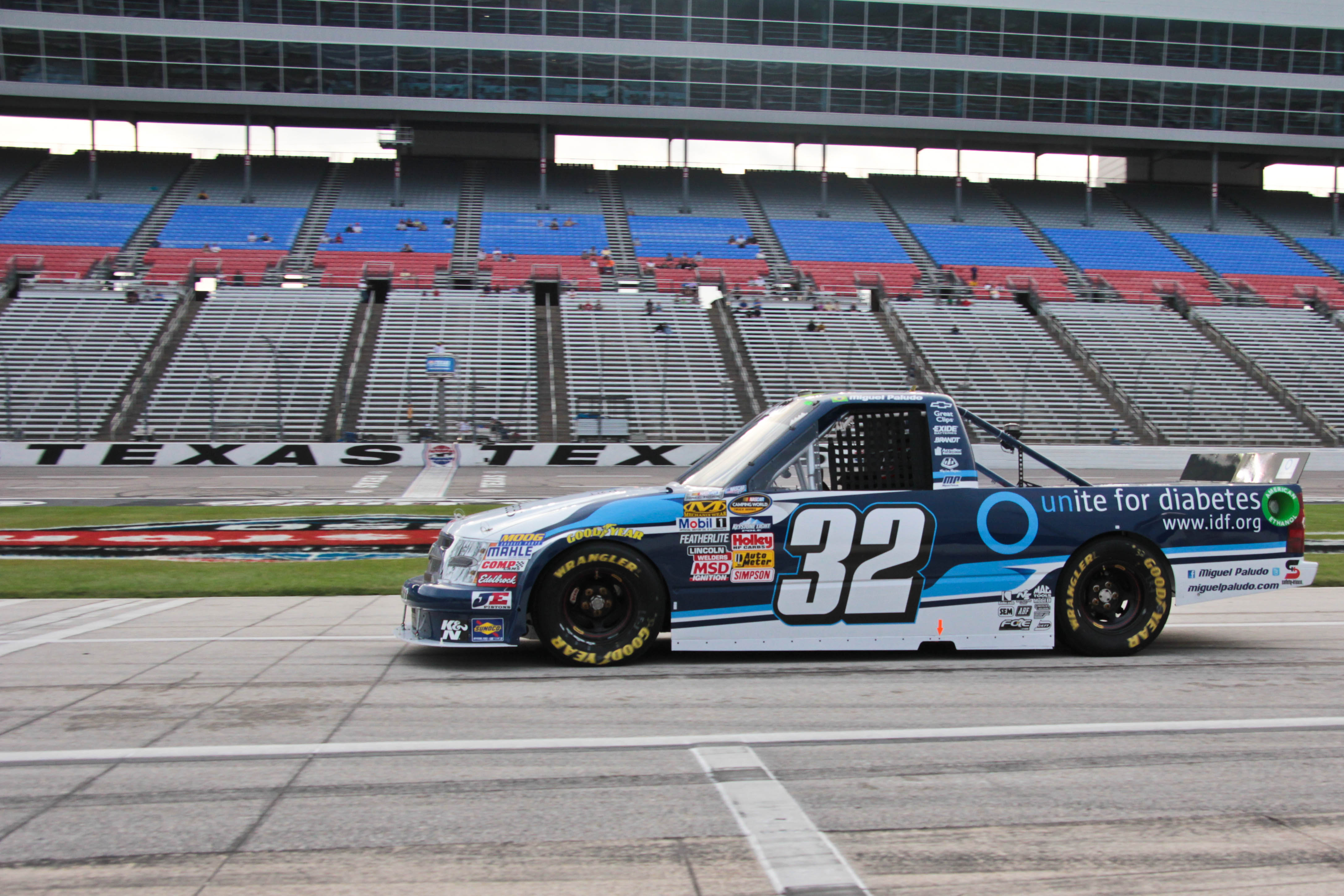
Paludo's No. 32 Unite for Diabetes/Duroline Chevrolet paint scheme at Texas Motor Speedway

Born in Nova Prata in the state of Rio Grande do Sul in southern Brazil, Paludo currently resides in Mooresville, North Carolina. He is married, and has one son, Oliver, with his wife Patricia.

=== Diabetes advocacy ===
Paludo was diagnosed with type 1 diabetes in 2004 at the age of 21 and has since become an advocate of diabetes awareness and care. In addition to a long-standing relationship with the American Diabetes Association, Paludo announced in 2012 that he would become the next Blue Circle Champion for the International Diabetes Federation, a worldwide alliance of some 200 diabetes associations in more than 160 countries. Paludo is the first representative of the organization from South America.

Paludo and his wife Patricia also learned in 2012 that their son Oliver, at the time only eight months old, was also a type 1 diabetic. In response to the news, Paludo ran a special No. 32 Unite for Diabetes/Duroline paint scheme in the June 2012 NCWTS race at Texas Motor Speedway. The scheme featured the blue circle, which is the international symbol for diabetes, and an image of Paludo and his son on the truck's tonneau cover. In November of that year, Paludo ran a World Diabetes Day paint scheme at both Texas Motor Speedway and Phoenix International Raceway.

== Motorsports career results ==
=== NASCAR ===
(key) (Bold – Pole position awarded by qualifying time. Italics – Pole position earned by points standings or practice time. * – Most laps led.)

==== Xfinity Series ====
NASCAR Xfinity Series results
| Year | Team | No. | Make | 1 | 2 | 3 | 4 | 5 | 6 | 7 | 8 | 9 | 10 | 11 | 12 | 13 | 14 | 15 | 16 | 17 | 18 | 19 | 20 | 21 | 22 | 23 | 24 | 25 | 26 | 27 | 28 | 29 | 30 | 31 | 32 | 33 | NXSC | Pts | Ref |
|---|---|---|---|---|---|---|---|---|---|---|---|---|---|---|---|---|---|---|---|---|---|---|---|---|---|---|---|---|---|---|---|---|---|---|---|---|---|---|---|
| 2012 | Turner Motorsports | 32 | Chevy | DAY | PHO | LVS | BRI | CAL | TEX | RCH | TAL | DAR | IOW | CLT | DOV | MCH | ROA; 29 | KEN | DAY | NHA | CHI | IND | IOW | | | | | | | | | | | | | | 125th^{1} | 0^{1} | |
| 2012 | Turner Motorsports | 30 | Chevy | | | | | | | | | | | | | | | | | | | | | GLN; 13 | CGV | BRI | ATL | RCH | CHI | KEN | DOV | CLT | KAN | TEX | PHO | HOM | 125th^{1} | 0^{1} | |
| 2021 | JR Motorsports | 8 | Chevy | DAY | DRC; 7 | HOM | LVS | PHO | ATL | MAR | TAL | DAR | DOV | COA; 34 | CLT | MOH; 27 | TEX | NSH | POC | ROA | ATL | NHA | GLN | IRC | MCH | DAY | DAR | RCH | BRI | LVS | TAL | ROV | TEX | KAN | MAR | PHO | 52nd | 44 | |
| 2022 | JR Motorsports | 88 | Chevy | DAY | CAL | LVS | PHO | ATL | COA; 9 | RCH | MAR | TAL | DOV | DAR | TEX | CLT | PIR | NSH | ROA; 26 | ATL | NHA | POC | IRC; 24 | MCH | GLN | DAY | DAR | KAN | BRI | TEX | TAL | ROV | LVS | HOM | MAR | PHO | 49th | 52 | |
| 2023 | JR Motorsports | 88 | Chevy | DAY | CAL | LVS | PHO | ATL | COA; 13 | RCH | MAR | TAL | DOV | DAR | CLT | PIR | SON | NSH | CSC; 13 | ATL | NHA | POC | ROA | MCH | IRC; 22 | GLN | DAY | DAR | KAN | BRI | TEX | ROV | LVS | HOM | MAR | PHO | 45th | 63 | |

==== Camping World Truck Series ====
NASCAR Camping World Truck Series results
| Year | Team | No. | Make | 1 | 2 | 3 | 4 | 5 | 6 | 7 | 8 | 9 | 10 | 11 | 12 | 13 | 14 | 15 | 16 | 17 | 18 | 19 | 20 | 21 | 22 | 23 | 24 | 25 | NCWTC | Pts | Ref |
|---|---|---|---|---|---|---|---|---|---|---|---|---|---|---|---|---|---|---|---|---|---|---|---|---|---|---|---|---|---|---|---|
| 2010 | Germain Racing | 77 | Toyota | DAY | ATL | MAR | NSH | KAN | DOV | CLT | TEX | MCH | IOW | GTY | IRP | POC | NSH | DAR | BRI; 9 | CHI | KEN; 20 | NHA | LVS | MAR | TAL | | | | 53rd | 443 | |
| 2010 | Red Horse Racing | 11 | Toyota | | | | | | | | | | | | | | | | | | | | | | | TEX; 33 | PHO | HOM; 9 | 53rd | 443 | |
| 2011 | Red Horse Racing | 7 | Toyota | DAY; 4 | PHO; 25 | DAR; 27 | MAR; 12 | NSH; 27 | DOV; 28 | CLT; 35 | KAN; 13 | TEX; 8 | KEN; 21 | IOW; 15 | NSH; 14 | IRP; 4 | POC; 19 | MCH; 3 | BRI; 31 | ATL; 22 | CHI; 8 | NHA; 10 | KEN; 25 | LVS; 27 | TAL; 18 | MAR; 16 | TEX; 9 | HOM; 31 | 17th | 651 | |
| 2012 | Turner Motorsports | 32 | Chevy | **DAY**; 30* | MAR; 17 | CAR; 15 | KAN; 10 | CLT; 14 | DOV; 12 | TEX; 14 | KEN; 12 | IOW; 13 | CHI; 17 | POC; 13 | MCH; 10 | BRI; 16 | ATL; 16 | IOW; 10 | KEN; 8 | LVS; 11 | TAL; 19 | MAR; 15 | TEX; 14 | PHO; 14 | HOM; 5 | | | | 10th | 668 | |
| 2013 | Turner Scott Motorsports | 32 | Chevy | DAY; 7 | MAR; 17 | CAR; 10 | KAN; 31 | CLT; 7 | DOV; 18 | TEX; 10 | KEN; 7 | IOW; 7 | ELD; 21 | POC; 2 | MCH; 5 | BRI; 13 | MSP; 3 | IOW; 14 | CHI; 12 | LVS; 3 | TAL; 19 | MAR; 21 | TEX; 8 | PHO; 31 | HOM; 11 | | | | 9th | 697 | |

==== K&N Pro Series East ====
NASCAR K&N Pro Series East results
| Year | Team | No. | Make | 1 | 2 | 3 | 4 | 5 | 6 | 7 | 8 | 9 | 10 | NKNPSEC | Pts | Ref |
|---|---|---|---|---|---|---|---|---|---|---|---|---|---|---|---|---|
| 2010 | Hattori Racing Enterprises | 77 | Toyota | GRE | SBO; 12 | IOW; 13 | MAR; 29 | NHA; 30 | LRP; 9 | LEE; 11 | JFC; 18 | NHA; 4 | DOV; 14 | 15th | 1058 | |

=== ARCA Racing Series ===
(key) (Bold – Pole position awarded by qualifying time. Italics – Pole position earned by points standings or practice time. * – Most laps led.)

ARCA Racing Series results
| Year | Team | No. | Make | 1 | 2 | 3 | 4 | 5 | 6 | 7 | 8 | 9 | 10 | 11 | 12 | 13 | 14 | 15 | 16 | 17 | 18 | 19 | 20 | ARSC | Pts | Ref |
|---|---|---|---|---|---|---|---|---|---|---|---|---|---|---|---|---|---|---|---|---|---|---|---|---|---|---|
| 2010 | Hattori Racing Enterprises | 17 | Toyota | DAY | PBE | SLM | TEX | TAL | TOL | POC | MCH | IOW | MFD | POC | BLN | NJE | ISF | CHI | DSF | TOL | SLM | KAN; 18 | CAR | 107th | 140 | |
| 2011 | Venturini Motorsports | 28 | Toyota | DAY; 13 | TAL | SLM | TOL | NJE | CHI | POC | MCH | WIN | BLN | IOW | IRP | POC | ISF | MAD | DSF | SLM | KAN | TOL | | 109th | 165 | |

^{*} Season still in progress
^{1} Ineligible for series points

Sporting positions
| Preceded by Ricardo Baptista | Porsche GT3 Cup Brazil Champion; 2008–2009 | Succeeded by Ricardo Rosset |
