= 2017 World Series Formula V8 3.5 =

Motor racing season

The 2017 World Series Formula V8 3.5 was a multi-event motor racing championship for open wheel, formula racing cars held across Europe, was the second and final season of the Formula V8 3.5 Series The championship features drivers competing in World Series Formula 3.5 V8 formula race cars that conform to the technical regulations for the championship. The 2017 became the first season as feeder series to FIA World Endurance Championship. The season also marked the return of the name "World Series" after one season, as the FIA accepted the request from promoter RPM Racing. The name "World Series" was retrieved from the championship after Renault Sport withdraw its support and the Formula Renault 3.5 became Formula V8 3.5 for the 2016 season. It was the final season of the series which was promoted by RPM-MKTG since 1998.

== Teams and drivers ==
Team	No.	Driver name	Status	Rounds
(Czech Republic) Lotus	3	(Austria) René Binder		All
(Czech Republic) Lotus	4	(Brazil) Pietro Fittipaldi		All
(Russia) SMP Racing with AVF	5	(Russia) Egor Orudzhev		1–8
(Russia) SMP Racing with AVF	5	(Russia) Konstantin Tereshchenko	R	9
(Russia) SMP Racing with AVF	6	(Russia) Matevos Isaakyan		All
(United Kingdom) Fortec Motorsports	7	(Mexico) Alfonso Celis Jr.		All
(United Kingdom) Fortec Motorsports	8	(Mexico) Diego Menchaca	R	All
(Spain) Teo Martín Motorsport	9	(Russia) Konstantin Tereshchenko	R	1–8
(Spain) Teo Martín Motorsport	10	(Canada) Nelson Mason	R	1–5
(Spain) Teo Martín Motorsport	10	(Spain) Álex Palou	R	6–8
(Italy) RP Motorsport	11	(Israel) Roy Nissany		All
(Italy) RP Motorsport	12	(Japan) Yu Kanamaru		All
(Italy) RP Motorsport	21	(Italy) Damiano Fioravanti	R	2–6
(Italy) RP Motorsport	21	(Colombia) Tatiana Calderón	R	9
(Italy) Il Barone Rampante	15	(Italy) Giuseppe Cipriani		1–8
(Italy) Il Barone Rampante	16	(Italy) Damiano Fioravanti	R	1
(Spain) AVF	17	(Portugal) Henrique Chaves	R	9

=== Driver changes ===
Changed teams

- Alfonso Celis Jr. switched from AVF to Fortec Motorsports.
- Pietro Fittipaldi, who raced for Fortec Motorsports moved to Lotus.
- Matevos Isaakyan moved from SMP Racing to AVF. He was joined in AVF by Egor Orudzhev, who left Arden Motorsport.
- Yu Kanamaru, who raced for Teo Martín Motorsport moved to RP Motorsport.

Entering World Series Formula V8 3.5

- Euroformula Open Championship drivers Damiano Fioravanti and Diego Menchaca made their debut with Il Barone Rampante and Fortec Motorsports respectively.
- Nelson Mason returned to racing for the first time since 2014 as he joins the World Series with Teo Martín Motorsport.
- Konstantin Tereshchenko stepped up from GP3 Series to race with Teo Martín Motorsport.

Leaving World Series Formula V8 3.5

- RP Motorsport driver Vitor Baptista returned to the Formula 3 Brasil championship.
- Fortec Motorsports driver and 2016 runner-up Louis Delétraz left the series to join the FIA Formula 2 Championship.
- 2016 champion Tom Dillmann moved to Formula E.
- Arden Motorsport driver Aurélien Panis will make his touring car racing debut in World Touring Car Championship.
- SMP Racing driver Matthieu Vaxiviere switched to sports car racing, moving to FIA World Endurance Championship

Mid-season changes

- Damiano Fioravanti restored his collaboration with RP Motorsport, leaving the Barone Rampante team after the first round due to funding issues. Fiorovanti's seat at RP Motorsport was taken by Tatiana Calderón, who will make her debut in the series in Bahrain.
- Prior to the Nürburgring round, Nelson Mason was replaced (due to a lack of funding) by Spanish driver Álex Palou.
- Prior to the Bahrain round, Egor Orudzhev was diagnosed with acute tonsillitis and was replaced by his fellow Russian Konstantin Tereshchenko.
- Henrique Chaves joined AVF in their third car for the final round in Bahrain.

=== Team changes ===
- Arden Motorsport, Comtec Racing and SMP Racing have left the series. However, both Comtec and the proposed Durango entry were listed on the World Series website with "TBC" driver names, suggesting they may enter at a later date. The Durango Racing Team entry was later bought by Giuseppe Cipriani, who entered his own team, Il Barone Rampante.

== Race calendar ==
The provisional calendar for the 2017 season was announced on 7 November 2016, at the final round of the 2016 season. The Nürburgring round will return to the World Series' schedule, while the Hungaroring, Le Castellet, Spielberg and Barcelona will be removed from the calendar. The championship will have rounds outside Europe for the first time since 2002, visiting Autódromo Hermanos Rodríguez, Circuit of the Americas and Bahrain International Circuit.

Round		Circuit	Date	Supporting
1	R1	(United Kingdom) Silverstone Circuit	15 April	6 Hours of Silverstone
1	R2	(United Kingdom) Silverstone Circuit	16 April	6 Hours of Silverstone
2	R1	(Belgium) Circuit de Spa-Francorchamps, Spa	5 May	6 Hours of Spa-Francorchamps
2	R2	(Belgium) Circuit de Spa-Francorchamps, Spa	6 May	6 Hours of Spa-Francorchamps
3	R1	(Italy) Autodromo Nazionale Monza, Monza	13 May	4 Hours of Monza
3	R2	(Italy) Autodromo Nazionale Monza, Monza	14 May	4 Hours of Monza
4	R1	(Spain) Circuito de Jerez, Jerez de la Frontera	27 May	Renault Clio Cup Spain
4	R2	(Spain) Circuito de Jerez, Jerez de la Frontera	28 May	Renault Clio Cup Spain
5	R1	(Spain) Ciudad del Motor de Aragón, Alcañiz	24 June	Renault Clio Cup Spain
5	R2	(Spain) Ciudad del Motor de Aragón, Alcañiz	25 June	Renault Clio Cup Spain
6	R1	(Germany) Nürburgring, Nürburg	15 July	6 Hours of Nürburgring
6	R2	(Germany) Nürburgring, Nürburg	16 July	6 Hours of Nürburgring
7	R1	Autódromo Hermanos Rodríguez, Mexico City	2 September	6 Hours of Mexico
7	R2	Autódromo Hermanos Rodríguez, Mexico City	3 September	6 Hours of Mexico
8	R1	(United States) Circuit of the Americas, Austin	15 September	6 Hours of Circuit of the Americas
8	R2	(United States) Circuit of the Americas, Austin	16 September	6 Hours of Circuit of the Americas
9	R1	Bahrain International Circuit, Sakhir	17 November	6 Hours of Bahrain
9	R2	Bahrain International Circuit, Sakhir	18 November	6 Hours of Bahrain

== Results ==
Round		Circuit	Pole position	Fastest lap	Winning driver	Winning team	Rookie winner
1	R1	(United Kingdom) Silverstone Circuit	(Brazil) Pietro Fittipaldi	(Mexico) Alfonso Celis Jr.	(Brazil) Pietro Fittipaldi	(Czech Republic) Lotus	(Italy) Damiano Fioravanti
1	R2	(United Kingdom) Silverstone Circuit	(Brazil) Pietro Fittipaldi	(Canada) Nelson Mason	(Brazil) Pietro Fittipaldi	(Czech Republic) Lotus	(Russia) Konstantin Tereshchenko
2	R1	(Belgium) Circuit de Spa-Francorchamps	(Mexico) Alfonso Celis Jr.	(Israel) Roy Nissany	(Mexico) Alfonso Celis Jr.	(United Kingdom) Fortec Motorsports	(Mexico) Diego Menchaca
2	R2	(Belgium) Circuit de Spa-Francorchamps	(Brazil) Pietro Fittipaldi	(Russia) Matevos Isaakyan	(Russia) Matevos Isaakyan	(Russia) SMP Racing with AVF	(Mexico) Diego Menchaca
3	R1	(Italy) Autodromo Nazionale Monza	(Brazil) Pietro Fittipaldi	(Brazil) Pietro Fittipaldi	(Austria) René Binder	(Czech Republic) Lotus	(Canada) Nelson Mason
3	R2	(Italy) Autodromo Nazionale Monza	(Brazil) Pietro Fittipaldi	(Israel) Roy Nissany	(Austria) René Binder	(Czech Republic) Lotus	(Canada) Nelson Mason
4	R1	(Spain) Circuito de Jerez	(Russia) Egor Orudzhev	(Russia) Egor Orudzhev	(Israel) Roy Nissany	(Italy) RP Motorsport	(Canada) Nelson Mason
4	R2	(Spain) Circuito de Jerez	(Brazil) Pietro Fittipaldi	(Brazil) Pietro Fittipaldi	(Brazil) Pietro Fittipaldi	(Czech Republic) Lotus	(Italy) Damiano Fioravanti
5	R1	(Spain) Ciudad del Motor de Aragón	(Brazil) Pietro Fittipaldi	(Russia) Egor Orudzhev	(Russia) Egor Orudzhev	(Russia) SMP Racing with AVF	(Russia) Konstantin Tereshchenko
5	R2	(Spain) Ciudad del Motor de Aragón	(Brazil) Pietro Fittipaldi	(Mexico) Alfonso Celis Jr.	(Brazil) Pietro Fittipaldi	(Czech Republic) Lotus	(Mexico) Diego Menchaca
6	R1	(Germany) Nürburgring	(Spain) Álex Palou	(Russia) Matevos Isaakyan	(Russia) Matevos Isaakyan	(Russia) SMP Racing with AVF	(Mexico) Diego Menchaca
6	R2	(Germany) Nürburgring	(Spain) Álex Palou	(Spain) Álex Palou	(Spain) Álex Palou	(Spain) Teo Martín Motorsport	(Spain) Álex Palou
7	R1	(Mexico) Autódromo Hermanos Rodríguez	(Brazil) Pietro Fittipaldi	(Russia) Matevos Isaakyan	(Brazil) Pietro Fittipaldi	(Czech Republic) Lotus	(Spain) Álex Palou
7	R2	(Mexico) Autódromo Hermanos Rodríguez	(Brazil) Pietro Fittipaldi	(Russia) Matevos Isaakyan	(Brazil) Pietro Fittipaldi	(Czech Republic) Lotus	(Russia) Konstantin Tereshchenko
8	R1	(United States) Circuit of the Americas	(Austria) René Binder	(Austria) René Binder	(Austria) René Binder	(Czech Republic) Lotus	(Spain) Álex Palou
8	R2	(United States) Circuit of the Americas	(Spain) Álex Palou	(Austria) René Binder	(Russia) Egor Orudzhev	(Russia) SMP Racing with AVF	(Spain) Álex Palou
9	R1	Bahrain International Circuit	(Russia) Matevos Isaakyan	(Portugal) Henrique Chaves	(Portugal) Henrique Chaves	(Spain) AVF	(Portugal) Henrique Chaves
9	R2	Bahrain International Circuit	(Austria) René Binder	(Japan) Yu Kanamaru	(Austria) René Binder	(Czech Republic) Lotus	(Colombia) Tatiana Calderón

== Championship standings ==
Points system

Points were awarded to the top 10 classified finishers.

Position	**1st**	**2nd**	**3rd**	**4th**	**5th**	**6th**	**7th**	**8th**	**9th**	**10th**
Points	25	18	15	12	10	8	6	4	2	1

=== Drivers' Championship ===
Pos	Driver	SIL (United Kingdom)		SPA (Belgium)		MNZ (Italy)		JER (Spain)		ARA (Spain)		NÜR (Germany)		MEX (Mexico)		COA (United States)		BHR (Bahrain)		Points
1	(Brazil) Pietro Fittipaldi	**1**	**1**	8	**6**	**9**	**4**	2	**1**	**Ret**	**1**	7	6	**1**	**1**	3	Ret	2	2	259
2	(Russia) Matevos Isaakyan	4	Ret	Ret	1	3	5	3	3	2	5	1	2	2	4	4	6	**NC**	9	215
3	(Mexico) Alfonso Celis Jr.	3	6	**1**	3	4	Ret	6	4	3	2	2	8	5	2	8	5	6	8	204
4	(Austria) René Binder	5	4	6	2	1	1	4	5	5	Ret	6	9	6	Ret	**1**	10	9	**1**	201
5	(Israel) Roy Nissany	Ret	3	2	4	2	2	1	Ret	4	6	4	5	9	8	6	4	3	4	201
6	(Russia) Egor Orudzhev	2	2	3	7	5	Ret	**Ret**	2	1	3	3	3	Ret	Ret	2	1			198
7	(Japan) Yu Kanamaru	10	Ret	5	8	Ret	3	7	10	7	4	5	7	7	7	7	7	4	6	115
8	(Russia) Konstantin Tereshchenko	8	5	10	11	8	7	8	7	6	Ret	9	4	4	3	Ret	8	7	Ret	94
9	(Mexico) Diego Menchaca	9	7	4	5	7	DNS	9	9	9	7	8	10	8	5	9	3	8	7	94
10	(Spain) Álex Palou											**11**	**1**	3	Ret	5	**2**			68
11	(Canada) Nelson Mason	7	Ret	9	9	6	6	5	8	DNP	9									42
12	(Italy) Damiano Fioravanti	6	8	7	10	Ret	Ret	Ret	6	8	8	10	Ret							36
13	(Portugal) Henrique Chaves																	1	5	35
14	(Colombia) Tatiana Calderón																	5	3	25
15	(Italy) Giuseppe Cipriani	11	9	Ret	12	10	8	10	Ret	10	10	12	Ret	10	6	Ret	9†			21
Pos	Driver	SIL (United Kingdom)		SPA (Belgium)		MNZ (Italy)		JER (Spain)		ARA (Spain)		NÜR (Germany)		MEX (Mexico)		COA (United States)		BHR (Bahrain)		Points

Colour	Result
Gold	Winner
Silver	Second place
Bronze	Third place
Green	Points classification
Blue	Non-points classification
Blue	Non-classified finish (NC)
Purple	Retired, not classified (Ret)
Red	Did not qualify (DNQ)
Red	Did not pre-qualify (DNPQ)
Black	Disqualified (DSQ)
White	Did not start (DNS)
White	Withdrew (WD)
White	Race cancelled (C)
Blank	Did not practice (DNP)
Blank	Did not arrive (DNA)
Blank	Excluded (EX)

**Bold** – Pole
Italics – Fastest Lap
† – Retired, but classified

=== Teams' Championship ===
Only two best-finishing cars are allowed to score points in the championship.

Pos	Team	SIL (United Kingdom)		SPA (Belgium)		MNZ (Italy)		JER (Spain)		ARA (Spain)		NÜR (Germany)		MEX (Mexico)		COA (United States)		BHR (Bahrain)		Points
1	(Czech Republic) Lotus	1	1	6	2	1	1	2	1	5	1	6	6	1	1	1	10	2	1	460
1	(Czech Republic) Lotus	5	4	8	6	9	4	4	4	Ret	Ret	7	9	6	Ret	3	Ret	9	2	460
2	(Russia) SMP Racing with AVF	2	2	3	1	3	5	3	2	1	3	1	2	2	4	2	1	7	9	419
2	(Russia) SMP Racing with AVF	4	Ret	Ret	7	5	Ret	Ret	3	2	5	3	3	Ret	Ret	4	6	NC	Ret	419
3	(Italy) RP Motorsport	10	3	2	4	2	2	1	6	4	4	4	5	7	7	6	4	3	3	313
3	(Italy) RP Motorsport	Ret	Ret	5	8	Ret	3	7	10	7	6	5	7	9	8	7	7	4	4	313
4	(United Kingdom) Fortec Motorsports	3	6	1	3	4	Ret	6	4	3	2	2	8	5	2	8	3	6	7	305
4	(United Kingdom) Fortec Motorsports	9	7	4	5	7	DNS	9	9	9	7	8	10	8	5	9	5	8	8	305
5	(Spain) Teo Martín Motorsport	7	5	9	9	6	6	5	7	6	9	9	1	3	3	5	2			198
5	(Spain) Teo Martín Motorsport	8	Ret	10	11	8	7	8	8	DNP	Ret	11	4	4	Ret	Ret	8			198
6	(Spain) AVF																	1	5	35
7	(Italy) Il Barone Rampante	6	8	Ret	12	10	8	10	Ret	10	10	12	Ret	10	6	Ret	9†			33
7	(Italy) Il Barone Rampante	11	9																	33
