= Igor Waliłko =

Polish racing driver (born 1997)

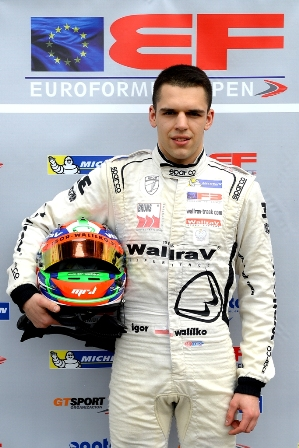
- Waliłko in 2016
- Nationality: (Poland) Polish
- Born: 12 September 1997 (age 29) Zielona Góra, Poland
- Categorisation: FIA Silver

Igor Jakub Waliłko (born 12 September 1997) is a Polish racing driver who last competed for FK Performance Motorsport in ADAC GT Masters. He won two races for Zakspeed in his rookie season in 2021, sharing a Mercedes-AMG GT3 Evo with Jules Gounon, and previously raced in Porsche Supercup. In single-seater racing, Waliłko reached the Euroformula Open Championship, where he scored two podiums for RP Motorsport in 2015.

== Personal life ==
Waliłko is the son of Rafał Mariusz Waliłko, who was the president and co-owner of the WallraV GoKart Race Center until his death in 2023.

== Career ==
Waliłko began his karting career at the age of eight. Starting out in mini karts, Waliłko most notably finished third in the 2009 Belgian Karting Championship's KF5 standings, before moving up to KF3 in 2010 and winning the Polish title. In March 2011, Waliłko was given a two-year suspension from karting after testing positive for nikethamide during the Deutsche Kart-Meisterschaft the previous year, but was later reduced to 18 months after appeal. Returning to karts in 2012, Waliłko won the Trofeo delle Industrie in KF, as well as driving for CRG–run LH Racing Team the following year.

In 2014, Waliłko made his single-seater debut in ADAC Formel Masters for JBR Motorsport & Engineering. In his only season in the series, Waliłko scored a pair of podiums at the Sachsenring to end the year tenth in points. Towards the end of the year, Waliłko made his Euroformula Open debut for Team West-Tec F3 at the finale in Barcelona. Remaining in Euroformula Open for 2015 but switching to RP Motorsport, Waliłko took a pair of third-place finishes at Spa and Monza en route to tenth overall, as teammate Vitor Baptista won the title. Waliłko then re-signed for RP Motorsport in 2016, but after the winter series he switched to Fortec Motorsports for the main season. He lasted four rounds, taking a best result of fifth at Le Castellet before leaving the series mid-season.

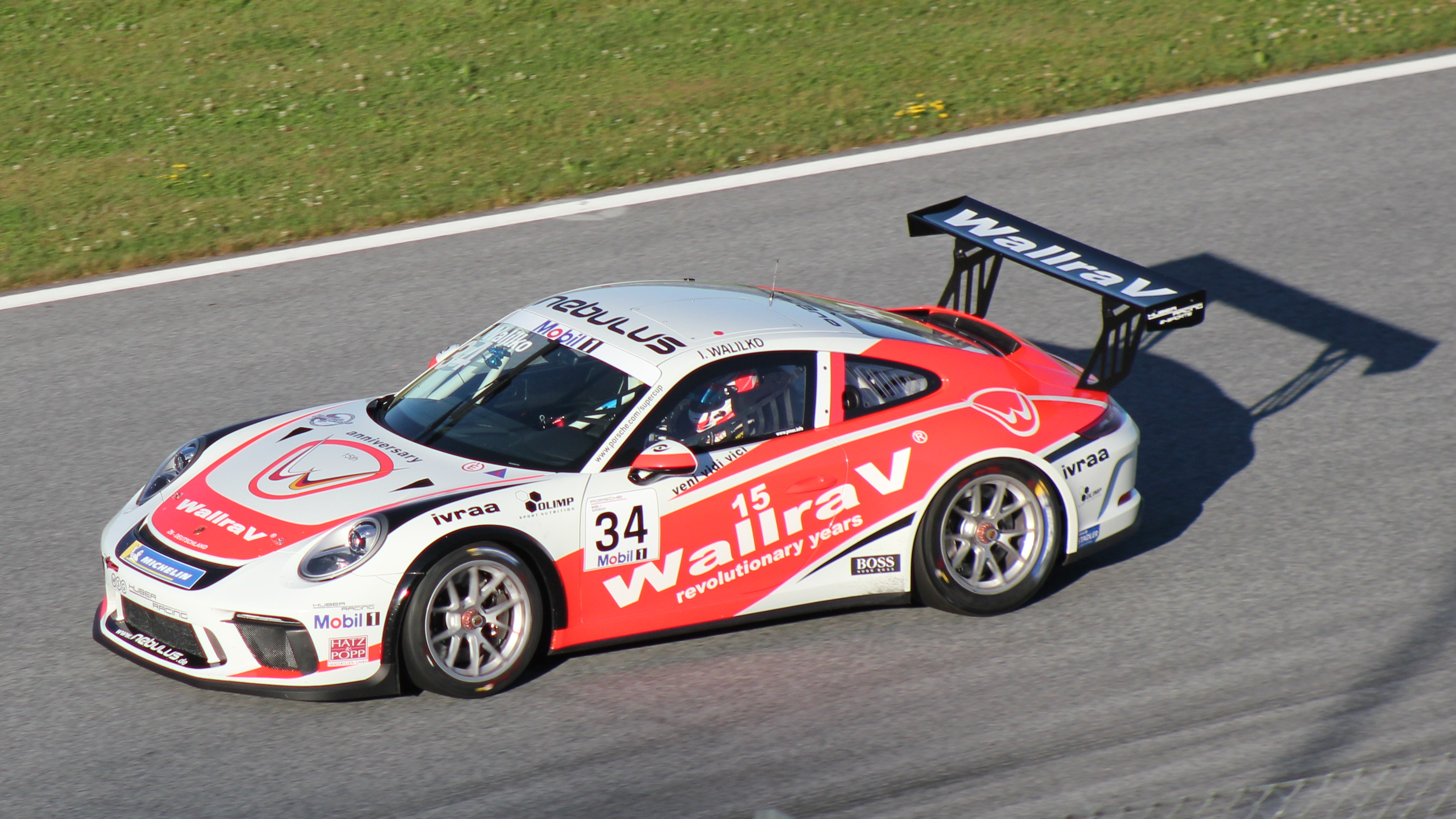
Waliłko racing in Porsche Supercup at the Red Bull Ring in 2019.

Waliłko switched to sportscars in 2017, making select starts in the 24H Series for Förch Racing powered by Olimp starting at the Dubai 24 Hour. For the rest of the year, Waliłko joined Olimp Racing by Lukas Motorsport for his rookie season in Porsche Supercup, where he placed 17th. A season in Porsche Carrera Cup Germany for Raceunion then followed, in which Waliłko finished seventh overall and runner-up in the rookie standings with a best result of fifth, before he made sporadic appearances in Porsche Supercup in 2019 for Huber Racing.

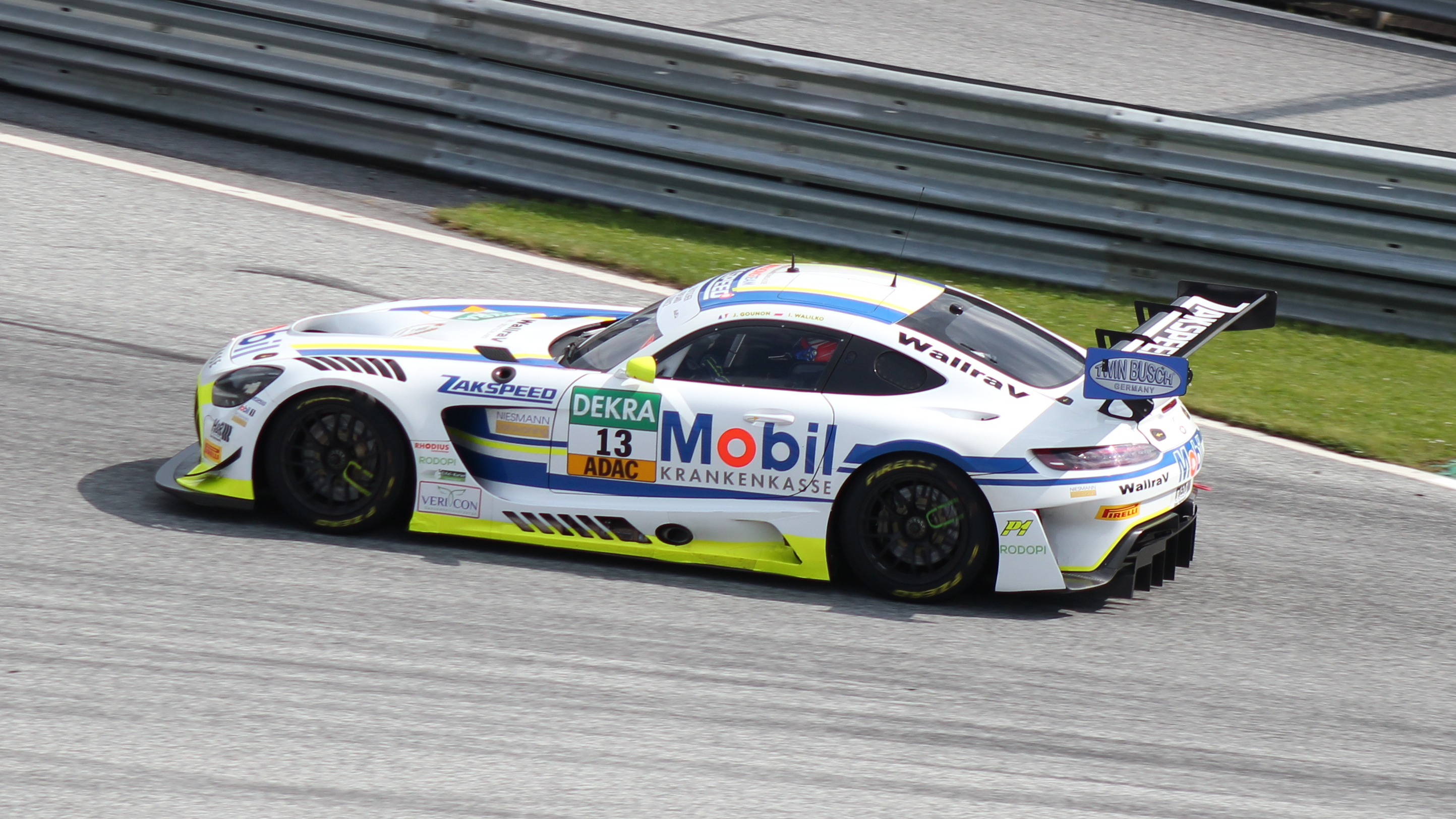
Waliłko's Zakspeed Mercedes, which won twice in ADAC GT Masters in 2021.

Waliłko graduated to GT3 competition in 2020, joining Audi-fielding BWT Mücke Motorsport to compete in ADAC GT Masters. After finishing no higher than 18th in the first four rounds, Waliłko sat out the rest of the season with an undisclosed injury. Returning to ADAC GT Masters in 2021, Waliłko drove a Mercedes-AMG GT3 Evo for Zakspeed alongside Jules Gounon. In his first full season in the series, Waliłko took wins at the Lausitzring and Sachsenring en route to a sixth-place points finish. Remaining with Mercedes machinery for 2022, Waliłko moved to AKKodis ASP Team in the GT World Challenge Europe Sprint Cup, where he finished tenth in the Silver Cup standings with Petru Umbrărescu.

In 2023, Waliłko entered the opening round of the GT World Challenge Europe Endurance Cup for Audi-aligned CSA Racing, before returning to ADAC GT Masters in a BMW M4 GT3 run by FK Performance Motorsport. Partnering Kim-Luis Schramm, Waliłko scored a best result of fourth at the Hockenheimring, before leaving the sport on personal grounds following his father's passing during the summer.

== Karting record ==
=== Karting career summary ===
Season	Series	Team	Position
2008	Euro Trophy – 60 Mini	IKR KC Llissa De Vall	15th
2008	ROK Cup International Final – Mini Rok		23rd
2009	Championnat de Belgique – KF5		3rd
2010	South Garda Winter Cup – KF3		30th
2010	WSK Euro Series – KF3	KSB Racing Team; Morsicani Racing (Note: Waliłko competed for KSB Racing Team in round 2 and for Morsicani Racing in rounds 3, 5.)	80th
2010	Andrea Margutti Trophy – KF3	KSB Racing Team	7th
2010	Deutsche Kart-Meisterschaft – KF3		13th
2010	Karting European Championship – KF3	Morsicani Racing; Birel ART Racing (Note: Waliłko competed for Morsicani Racing in round 3 and for Birel ART Racing in round 4.)	
2010	Karting World Cup – KF3	KSB Racing Team	32nd
2012	South Garda Winter Cup – KF2		32nd
2012	WSK Master Series – KF	RK Racing Team	62nd
2012	WSK Euro Series – KF	Morsicani Racing; Ricky Flynn Motorsport (Note: Waliłko competed for Morsicani Racing in rounds 2–3 and for Ricky Flynn Motorsport in round 4.)	67th
2012	Karting European Championship – KF2	Morsicani Racing	84th
2012	Karting World Cup – KF2		33rd
2012	WSK Final Cup – KF		26th
2012	Trofeo Delle Industrie – KF2		1st
2013	WSK Master Series – KF	LH Racing Team	23rd
2013	South Garda Winter Cup – KF		27th
2013	WSK Euro Series – KF	LH Racing Team; Forza Racing (Note: Waliłko competed for LH Racing Team in rounds 1–2 and for Forza Racing in round 3–4.)	31st
2013	Karting European Championship – KF	Forza Racing	47th
2013	Karting World Championship – KF	Kosmic Racing Department	32nd

== Racing record ==
=== Racing career summary ===
Season	Series	Team	Races	Wins	Poles	F/Laps	Podiums	Points	Position
2014	ADAC Formel Masters	JBR Motorsport & Engineering	24	0	0	0	2	89	10th
2014	Euroformula Open Championship	Team West-Tec F3	2	0	0	0	0	0	NC†
2014	Spanish Formula Three Championship	Team West-Tec F3	2	0	0	0	0	0	NC†
2015	Euroformula Open Winter Series	RP Motorsport	2	0	0	0	0		
2015	Euroformula Open Championship	RP Motorsport	16	0	0	0	2	62	10th
2015	Spanish Formula Three Championship	RP Motorsport	6	0	0	0	0	10	13th
2016	Euroformula Open Winter Series	RP Motorsport	2	0	0	0	0		
2016	Euroformula Open Championship	Fortec Motorsports	8	0	0	0	0	50	10th
2016	Spanish Formula Three Championship	Fortec Motorsports	2	0	0	0	0	14	12th
2017	24H Series – 991	Förch Racing powered by Olimp	3	0	0	0	0	0	NC
2017	Porsche Supercup	Olimp Racing by Lukas Motorsport	11	0	0	0	0	24	17th
2017	Porsche Carrera Cup Germany	Förch Racing by Lukas Motorsport	2	0	0	0	0	0	NC†
2018	Porsche Carrera Cup Germany	Raceunion	14	0	0	0	0	94	7th
2018	Porsche Supercup	MSG Huber Racing	2	0	0	0	0	2	27th
2018	Porsche Supercup	Lechner Racing Middle East	1	0	0	0	0	2	27th
2019	Porsche Supercup	Huber Racing	3	0	0	0	0	0	NC†
2020	ADAC GT Masters	BWT Mücke Motorsport	8	0	0	0	0	0	NC
2021	ADAC GT Masters	Team Zakspeed Mobil Krankenkasse Racing	14	2	0	0	2	136	6th
2022	GT World Challenge Europe Sprint Cup	AKKodis ASP Team	10	0	0	0	0	0	NC
2022	GT World Challenge Europe Sprint Cup – Silver	AKKodis ASP Team	10	0	0	0	0	30.5	10th
2023	GT World Challenge Europe Endurance Cup	CSA Racing	1	0	0	0	0	0	NC
2023	GT World Challenge Europe Endurance Cup – Bronze	CSA Racing	1	0	0	0	0	0	NC
2023	ADAC GT Masters	FK Performance Motorsport	4	0	0	0	0	37	15th

* Season still in progress.

^{†} As Waliłko was a guest driver, he was ineligible for points.

=== Complete ADAC Formel Masters results ===
(key) (Races in bold indicate pole position) (Races in italics indicate fastest lap)

Year	Entrant	1	2	3	4	5	6	7	8	9	10	11	12	13	14	15	16	17	18	19	20	21	22	23	24	DC	Points
2014	JBR Motorsport & Engineering	OSC; 1; 8	OSC; 2 Ret	OSC; 3 Ret	ZAN; 1; 8	ZAN; 2; 10	ZAN; 3 Ret	LAU; 1 Ret	LAU; 2; 14	LAU; 3; 12	RBR; 1; 10	RBR; 2; 11	RBR; 3; 9	SVK; 1; 5	SVK; 2; 5	SVK; 3 Ret	NÜR; 1; 9	NÜR; 2; 8	NÜR; 3; 12	SAC; 1; 4	SAC; 2; 2	SAC; 3; 3	HOC; 1; 7	HOC; 2; 9	HOC; 3; 6	10th	89

=== Complete Euroformula Open Championship results ===
(key) (Races in bold indicate pole position) (Races in italics indicate fastest lap)

Year	Entrant	1	2	3	4	5	6	7	8	9	10	11	12	13	14	15	16	Pos	Points
2014	Team West-Tec F3	NÜR; 1	NÜR; 2	ALG; 1	ALG; 2	JER; 1	JER; 2	HUN; 1	HUN; 2	SIL; 1	SIL; 2	SPA; 1	SPA; 2	MNZ; 1	MNZ; 2	CAT; 1; 14	CAT; 2; 14	NC†	0†
2015	RP Motorsport	JER; 1 Ret	JER; 2; 11	LEC; 1; 7	LEC; 2 Ret	EST; 1; 7	EST; 2; 9	SIL; 1; 14	SIL; 2; 17	RBR; 1; 6	RBR; 2; 9	SPA; 1; 18	SPA; 2; 3	MNZ; 1; 7	MNZ; 2; 3	CAT; 1; 11	CAT; 2 Ret	10th	62
2016	Fortec Motorsports	EST; 1; 6	EST; 2; 7	SPA; 1; 7	SPA; 2; 9	LEC; 1; 5	LEC; 2; 6	SIL; 1; 8	SIL; 2; 7	RBR; 1	RBR; 2	MNZ; 1	MNZ; 2	JER; 1	JER; 2	CAT; 1	CAT; 2	10th	50

=== Complete Porsche Supercup results ===
(key) (Races in bold indicate pole position) (Races in italics indicate fastest lap)

Year	Team	1	2	3	4	5	6	7	8	9	10	11	Pos.	Pts
2017	Olimp Racing by Lukas Motorsport	CAT; 12	CAT; DSQ	MON; Ret	RBR; 14	SIL; 14	HUN; 11	SPA; 11	SPA; 24	MNZ; 28†	MEX; 13	MEX; 28†	17th	24
2018	MSG Huber Racing	CAT	MON	RBR; 12	SIL	HOC; 10	HUN	SPA					27th	9
2018	Lechner Racing Middle East								MNZ; 14	MEX	MEX		27th	9
2019	Huber Racing	CAT	MON	RBR; 27	SIL	HOC; 11	HUN	SPA	MNZ; 15	MEX	MEX		NC†	0†

=== Complete ADAC GT Masters results ===
(key) (Races in bold indicate pole position) (Races in italics indicate fastest lap)

Year	Team	Car	1	2	3	4	5	6	7	8	9	10	11	12	13	14	DC	Points
2020	BWT Mücke Motorsport	Audi R8 LMS Evo	LAU1; 1; 28	LAU1; 2; 28	NÜR; 1; 22	NÜR; 2; 28	HOC; 1; 28	HOC; 2; 24	SAC; 1; 19	SAC; 2; 18	RBR; 1	RBR; 2	LAU2; 1	LAU2; 2	OSC; 1	OSC; 2	NC	0
2021	Team Zakspeed Mobil Krankenkasse Racing	Mercedes-AMG GT3 Evo	OSC; 1; 15	OSC; 2; 4	RBR; 1; 13	RBR; 2; 8	ZAN; 1; 8	ZAN; 2; 5	LAU; 1 Ret	**LAU**; **2**; 1	SAC; 1; 9	**SAC**; **2**; 1	HOC; 1; 10	HOC; 2; 5	NÜR; 1; 19	NÜR; 2; 6	6th	136
2023	FK Performance Motorsport	BMW M4 GT3	HOC; 1; 4	HOC; 2; 8	NOR; 1; 8	NOR; 2; 8	NÜR; 1	NÜR; 2	SAC; 1	SAC; 2	RBR; 1	RBR; 2	HOC; 1	HOC; 2			15th	37

=== Complete GT World Challenge Europe results ===
==== GT World Challenge Europe Sprint Cup ====
(Races in bold indicate pole position) (Races in italics indicate fastest lap)

Year	Team	Car	Class	1	2	3	4	5	6	7	8	9	10	Pos.	Points
2022	AKKodis ASP Team	Mercedes-AMG GT3 Evo	Silver	BRH; 1; 20	BRH; 2; 15	MAG; 1; 17	MAG; 2; 19	ZAN; 1; 21	ZAN; 2; 12	MIS; 1; 15	MIS; 2; 22	VAL; 1 Ret	VAL; 2; 18	10th	30.5

==== GT World Challenge Europe Endurance Cup ====
(key) (Races in bold indicate pole position) (Races in italics indicate fastest lap)

Year	Team	Car	Class	1	2	3	4	5	6	7	Pos.	Points
2023	CSA Racing	Audi R8 LMS Evo II	Bronze	MNZ; 37	LEC	SPA; 6H	SPA; 12H	SPA; 24H	NÜR	CAT	NC	0
