= Verra =

Verra may refer to:

- Verra (organization), an organization that administers voluntary standards and frameworks used in environmental markets
- Ryan Verra, a Canadian entrepreneur and professional race car driver from Calgary.
- Joan Verra, a fictional character
