= 2014 Fórmula 3 Brasil season =

Seasons
- ← 2013 2015 →

The 2014 Fórmula 3 Brasil season was the eighth Fórmula 3 Brasil season and the first since 1995, replacing the Formula 3 Sudamericana series as the highest-profile single-seater championship on the continent.

The championship was dominated by Pedro Piquet, the son of three-time Formula One world champion Nelson Piquet, winning 12 of the 16 races – 11 overall wins, plus a class win at Santa Cruz do Sul – that were held during the season. Driving for the Cesário F3 team, Piquet finished nearly 100 points clear of his closest championship rival, Lukas Moraes. Moraes failed to finish each of the first three races during the season, but recovered to fend off Bruno Etman for the runner-up position, by just a single point. Moraes was also a race winner, taking a victory at Interlagos. The only other Class A driver to take a race victory was Renan Guerra, who won the second race at Interlagos, in a one-off appearance in the class, before moving to Class B for the remainder of the season.

Just like in the main class, one driver dominated in Class B. Piquet's Cesário F3 team-mate Vitor Baptista achieved 13 class victories from a possible 16, and took a trio of overall wins in the process, at Santa Cruz do Sul, Velopark and Curitiba respectively. Like Piquet, Baptista finished nearly 100 points clear of his closest championship rival, Matheus Leist. Leist won the class at Velopark and Goiânia, having joined the Césario team mid-season after commencing the campaign with Hitech Racing. Third place in class went to the only other race winner, Matheus Iorio of Hitech Racing, who won the final race of the season at Goiânia, to overhaul Victor Miranda in the points standings; it was the only race in the class not won by Césario. With commanding title wins for their drivers, Cesário F3 won both teams' championship titles by a large margin.

== Drivers and teams ==
- All cars were powered by Berta engines, and ran on Pirelli tyres.

Team	No.	Driver	Chassis	Rounds
Class A
(Brazil) Cesário F3	5	(Brazil) Pedro Piquet	Dallara F309	All
(Brazil) Cesário F3	7	(Brazil) Sérgio Sette Câmara	Dallara F309	4–8
(Brazil) Prop Car Racing	11	(Brazil) Lukas Moraes	Dallara F309	All
(Brazil) Prop Car Racing	84	(Brazil) Fernando Croce	Dallara F309	3–8
(United Kingdom) Hitech Racing	12	(Brazil) Arthur Oliveira	Dallara F309	1, 3–4
(United Kingdom) Hitech Racing	27	(Argentina) Bruno Etman	Dallara F309	All
(United Kingdom) Hitech Racing	111	(Brazil) Gaetano di Mauro	Dallara F309	5
(Brazil) RR Racing	15	(Brazil) Raphael Raucci	Dallara F309	1–3, 5–8
(Brazil) RR Racing	28	(Brazil) Artur Fortunato	Dallara F309	1–4
(Brazil) RR Racing	46	(Brazil) Mauro Auricchio	Dallara F309	5–8
(Brazil) RR Racing	77	(Brazil) Renan Guerra	Dallara F309	4
(Brazil) A Fortunato F3 Racing	28	(Brazil) Artur Fortunato	Dallara F309	5–8
(Brazil) Kemba Racing	91	(Brazil) Leonardo de Souza	Dallara F309	1–2, 4–6
Class B
(Brazil) RR Racing	3	(Canada) Ryan Verra	Dallara F301	6, 8
(Brazil) RR Racing	17	(United States) Nicholas Silva	Dallara F301	4–6
(Brazil) RR Racing	46	(Brazil) Mauro Auricchio	Dallara F301	1–4
(Brazil) RR Racing	53	(Brazil) Victor Miranda	Dallara F301	1–4
(Brazil) RR Racing	77	(Brazil) Renan Guerra	Dallara F301	5–8
(Brazil) Cesário F3	18	(Brazil) Matheus Leist	Dallara F301	4–8
(Brazil) Cesário F3	21	(Brazil) Vitor Baptista	Dallara F301	All
(Brazil) Prop Car Racing	10	(Brazil) Pedro Fortes	Dallara F301	3
(Brazil) Prop Car Racing	16	(Brazil) Alexandre Doretto	Dallara F301	1–2
(Brazil) Prop Car Racing	53	(Brazil) Victor Miranda	Dallara F301	5–8
(Brazil) Prop Car Racing	66	(Brazil) Ricardo Landucci	Dallara F301	4–6
(Brazil) Prop Car Racing	84	(Brazil) Fernando Croce	Dallara F301	1–2
(United Kingdom) Hitech Racing	18	(Brazil) Matheus Leist	Dallara F301	1–3
(United Kingdom) Hitech Racing	34	(Brazil) Matheus Iorio	Dallara F301	All
(Brazil) Chenim Racing	19	(Brazil) Denis Navarro	Dallara F301	5
(Brazil) EMB Racing	25	(Brazil) Gabriel Kenji	Dallara F301	1–2
(Brazil) EMB Racing	43	(Brazil) Dario Lintz	Dallara F301	7
(Brazil) Capital Motorsport	99	(Brazil) Francisco Alfaya	Dallara F301	1–3, 5

== Race calendar and results ==
A calendar for the 2014 season was released on 12 December 2013, with the category supporting Brasileiro de Marcas at seven of the season's eight rounds, with the exception being Santa Cruz do Sul, with that round supporting Stock Car Brasil. All races were held in Brazil.

Round		Circuit	Date	Pole position	Fastest lap	Winning driver	Winning team	Class B winner
1	R1	Autódromo Internacional de Tarumã	5 April	(Brazil) Pedro Piquet	(Brazil) Lukas Moraes	(Brazil) Pedro Piquet	(Brazil) Césario F3	(Brazil) Vitor Baptista
1	R2	Autódromo Internacional de Tarumã	6 April		(Brazil) Pedro Piquet	(Brazil) Pedro Piquet	(Brazil) Césario F3	(Brazil) Vitor Baptista
2	R1	Autódromo Internacional de Santa Cruz do Sul	12 April	(Brazil) Pedro Piquet	(Brazil) Pedro Piquet	(Brazil) Pedro Piquet	(Brazil) Césario F3	(Brazil) Vitor Baptista
2	R2	Autódromo Internacional de Santa Cruz do Sul	13 April		(Brazil) Pedro Piquet	(Brazil) Vitor Baptista	(Brazil) Césario F3	(Brazil) Vitor Baptista
3	R1	Autódromo Internacional Nelson Piquet	3 May	(Brazil) Pedro Piquet	(Brazil) Pedro Piquet	(Brazil) Pedro Piquet	(Brazil) Césario F3	(Brazil) Vitor Baptista
3	R2	Autódromo Internacional Nelson Piquet	4 May		(Brazil) Artur Fortunato	(Brazil) Pedro Piquet	(Brazil) Césario F3	(Brazil) Vitor Baptista
4	R1	Autódromo José Carlos Pace	24 May	(Brazil) Lukas Moraes	(Brazil) Lukas Moraes	(Brazil) Lukas Moraes	(Brazil) Prop Car Racing	(Brazil) Vitor Baptista
4	R2	Autódromo José Carlos Pace	25 May		(Brazil) Vitor Baptista	(Brazil) Renan Guerra	(Brazil) RR Racing	(Brazil) Vitor Baptista
5	R1	Autódromo Internacional de Curitiba	26 July	(Brazil) Pedro Piquet	(Brazil) Pedro Piquet	(Brazil) Pedro Piquet	(Brazil) Césario F3	(Brazil) Vitor Baptista
5	R2	Autódromo Internacional de Curitiba	27 July		(Brazil) Pedro Piquet	(Brazil) Pedro Piquet	(Brazil) Césario F3	(Brazil) Vitor Baptista
6	R1	Velopark, Nova Santa Rita	7 September (Note: The first race at Velopark was postponed from 6 September due to persistent rain.)	(Brazil) Pedro Piquet	(Brazil) Vitor Baptista	(Brazil) Pedro Piquet	(Brazil) Césario F3	(Brazil) Matheus Leist
6	R2	Velopark, Nova Santa Rita	7 September		(Brazil) Sérgio Sette Câmara	(Brazil) Vitor Baptista	(Brazil) Césario F3	(Brazil) Vitor Baptista
7	R1	Autódromo Internacional de Curitiba	18 October	(Brazil) Pedro Piquet	(Brazil) Pedro Piquet	(Brazil) Pedro Piquet	(Brazil) Césario F3	(Brazil) Vitor Baptista
7	R2	Autódromo Internacional de Curitiba	19 October		(Brazil) Sérgio Sette Câmara	(Brazil) Vitor Baptista	(Brazil) Césario F3	(Brazil) Vitor Baptista
8	R1	Autódromo Internacional Ayrton Senna	22 November	(Brazil) Sérgio Sette Câmara	(Brazil) Pedro Piquet	(Brazil) Pedro Piquet	(Brazil) Césario F3	(Brazil) Matheus Leist
8	R2	Autódromo Internacional Ayrton Senna	23 November		(Brazil) Pedro Piquet	(Brazil) Pedro Piquet	(Brazil) Césario F3	(Brazil) Matheus Iorio

== Championship standings ==
- Points were awarded as follows:

Position	1	2	3	4	5	6	7	8
Points	15	12	9	7	5	3	2	1

=== Drivers' Championships ===
Pos	Driver	TAR		SCS		BRA		INT		CUR		VEL		CUR		GOI		Pts
Class A
1	(Brazil) Pedro Piquet	**1**	1	**1**	2	**1**	1	5	3	**1**	1	**1**	4	**1**	Ret	1	1	211
2	(Brazil) Lukas Moraes	Ret	Ret	Ret	3	2	3	**1**	8	5	6	2	Ret	4	6	3	DSQ	116
3	(Argentina) Bruno Etman	2	4	2	4	4	8	4	4	NC	7	10	Ret	5	7	5	2	115
4	(Brazil) Artur Fortunato	3	7	7	5	3	Ret	9	5	DSQ	8	6	Ret	3	2	Ret	Ret	83
5	(Brazil) Raphael Raucci	5	2	3	Ret	6	4			Ret	11	4	6	Ret	4	Ret	3	81
6	(Brazil) Leonardo de Souza	6	5	11	8			8	10	Ret	Ret	5	3					49
7	(Brazil) Sérgio Sette Câmara							6	12	6	4	7	Ret	Ret	11	**2**	Ret	45
8	(Brazil) Fernando Croce					Ret	10	12	Ret	Ret	Ret	Ret	5	8	9	8	5	32
9	(Brazil) Renan Guerra							3	1									27
10	(Brazil) Mauro Auricchio									Ret	12	9	Ret	Ret	Ret	7	7	13
11	(Brazil) Arthur Oliveira	Ret	Ret			Ret	9	11	9									9
12	(Brazil) Gaetano di Mauro									Ret	9							3
Class B
1	(Brazil) Vitor Baptista	**4**	3	4	1	**5**	2	**2**	2	**2**	2	NC	1	2	1	Ret	6	207
2	(Brazil) Matheus Leist	7	Ret	5	Ret	Ret	Ret	7	7	3	3	**3**	Ret	**9**	5	4	Ret	115
3	(Brazil) Matheus Iorio	Ret	Ret	6	9	7	7	13	11	7	10	12	Ret	7	10	DSQ	4	99
4	(Brazil) Victor Miranda	Ret	Ret	Ret	6	8	6	10	6	Ret	Ret	11	Ret	6	3	6	Ret	96
5	(Brazil) Renan Guerra									4	5	8	2	Ret	8	**NC**	Ret	49
6	(Brazil) Mauro Auricchio	Ret	6	8	Ret	Ret	5	15	Ret									34
7	(Brazil) Alexandre Doretto	8	8	10	7													30
8	(Canada) Ryan Verra											14	DSQ			9	8	21
9	(Brazil) Gabriel Kenji	Ret	9	9	Ret													12
10	(Brazil) Francisco Alfaya	Ret	10	**DSQ**	Ret	Ret	Ret			8	Ret							10
10	(Brazil) Ricardo Landucci							Ret	Ret	Ret	13	13	Ret					10
12	(United States) Nicholas Silva							10	Ret	Ret	Ret	Ret	Ret					5
	(Brazil) Pedro Fortes					Ret	Ret											0
	(Brazil) Dario Lintz													Ret	Ret			0
	(Brazil) Denis Navarro									Ret	DNS							0
	(Brazil) Fernando Croce	WD	WD	WD	WD													0
Pos	Driver	TAR		SCS		BRA		INT		CUR		VEL		CUR		GOI		Pts

Colour	Result
Gold	Winner
Silver	Second place
Bronze	Third place
Green	Points classification
Blue	Non-points classification
Blue	Non-classified finish (NC)
Purple	Retired, not classified (Ret)
Red	Did not qualify (DNQ)
Red	Did not pre-qualify (DNPQ)
Black	Disqualified (DSQ)
White	Did not start (DNS)
White	Withdrew (WD)
White	Race cancelled (C)
Blank	Did not practice (DNP)
Blank	Did not arrive (DNA)
Blank	Excluded (EX)

**Bold** – Pole
Italics – Fastest Lap

=== Teams' Championships ===
Pos	Team	TAR		SCS		BRA		INT		CUR		VEL		CUR		GOI		Pts
Class A
1	(Brazil) Cesário F3	1	1	1	2	1	1	5	3	1	1	1	4	1	11	1	1	256
1	(Brazil) Cesário F3							6	12	6	4	7	Ret	Ret	Ret	2	Ret	256
2	(Brazil) RR Racing	3	2	3	5	3	4	3	1	Ret	11	4	6	Ret	4	7	3	167
2	(Brazil) RR Racing	5	7	7	Ret	6	Ret	9	5	Ret	12	9	Ret	Ret	Ret	Ret	7	167
3	(Brazil) Prop Car Racing	Ret	Ret	Ret	3	2	3	1	8	5	6	2	5	4	6	3	5	148
3	(Brazil) Prop Car Racing					Ret	10	12	Ret	Ret	Ret	Ret	Ret	8	9	8	DSQ	148
4	(United Kingdom) Hitech Racing	2	4	2	4	4	8	4	4	NC	7	10	Ret	5	7	5	2	127
4	(United Kingdom) Hitech Racing	Ret	Ret			Ret	9	11	9	Ret	9							127
5	(Brazil) Kemba Racing	11	8	6	5			8	10	Ret	Ret	5	3					49
6	(Brazil) A Fortunato F3 Racing									DSQ	8	6	Ret	3	2	Ret	Ret	37
Class B
1	(Brazil) Cesário F3	4	3	4	1	5	2	2	2	2	2	3	1	2	1	4	6	298
1	(Brazil) Cesário F3							7	7	3	3	NC	Ret	9	5	Ret	Ret	298
2	(Brazil) RR Racing	Ret	6	8	6	8	5	10	6	4	5	8	2	Ret	8	9	8	152
2	(Brazil) RR Racing	Ret	Ret	Ret	Ret	Ret	6	15	Ret	Ret	Ret	Ret	Ret			NC	Ret	152
3	(United Kingdom) Hitech Racing	7	Ret	5	9	7	7	13	11	7	10	12	Ret	7	10	DSQ	4	123
3	(United Kingdom) Hitech Racing	Ret	Ret	6	Ret	Ret	Ret											123
4	(Brazil) Prop Car Racing	8	8	10	7	Ret	Ret	Ret	Ret	Ret	13	11	Ret	6	3	6	Ret	85
4	(Brazil) Prop Car Racing	WD	WD	WD	WD					Ret	Ret	13	Ret					85
5	(Brazil) EMB Racing	Ret	9	9	Ret									Ret	Ret			12
6	(Brazil) Capital Motorsport	Ret	10	DSQ	Ret	Ret	Ret			8	Ret							10
7	(Brazil) RR/Capital							10	Ret			14	DSQ					8
	(Brazil) Chenin Racing									Ret	DNS							0
Pos	Team	TAR		SCS		BRA		INT		CUR		VEL		CUR		GOI		Pts

Colour	Result
Gold	Winner
Silver	Second place
Bronze	Third place
Green	Points classification
Blue	Non-points classification
Blue	Non-classified finish (NC)
Purple	Retired, not classified (Ret)
Red	Did not qualify (DNQ)
Red	Did not pre-qualify (DNPQ)
Black	Disqualified (DSQ)
White	Did not start (DNS)
White	Withdrew (WD)
White	Race cancelled (C)
Blank	Did not practice (DNP)
Blank	Did not arrive (DNA)
Blank	Excluded (EX)

**Bold** – Pole
Italics – Fastest Lap
