= 2015 Euroformula Open Championship =

Motor racing championship

The 2015 Euroformula Open Championship was a multi-event motor racing championship for single-seat open wheel formula racing cars that was held across Europe. The championship featured drivers competing in two-litre Formula Three racing cars built by Italian constructor Dallara which conformed to the technical regulations, or formula, for the championship. The series changed tyre supplier from Dunlop to Michelin. It was the second Euroformula Open Championship season.

RP Motorsport driver Vitor Baptista claimed the championship title by five points (on dropped scores), winning six races during the 2015 campaign, including four consecutive victories during the second half of the season. The runner-up position in the championship went to Konstantin Tereshchenko for Campos Racing, who like Baptista, took six victories during the season. The championship top-three was completed by Yu Kanamaru, who took a single race victory at Silverstone for Emilio de Villota's team. Other drivers to win races were DAV Racing's Alessio Rovera (Jerez) and Leonardo Pulcini (Red Bull Ring), while Baptista's teammate Damiano Fioravanti won at Monza. These seven wins for RP Motorsport enabled them to win the teams' championship by ten points ahead of Campos Racing.

In the Spanish Formula Three sub-classification, Tereshchenko and Campos Racing snared their respective titles. Over the three meetings at Jerez, Estoril and Barcelona, Tereshchenko won four of the six races to best Baptista by thirty-seven points, who only won once, at Estoril. Kanamaru finished a further nine points in arrears in third place. With Tereshchenko's four wins, Campos Racing finished nine points clear of RP Motorsport in the teams' championship.

== Teams and drivers ==
- All cars were powered by Toyota engines.

Team	No.	Driver	Status	Rounds
(Italy) RP Motorsport	1	(Guatemala) Andrés Saravia		NC, All
(Italy) RP Motorsport	3	(Brazil) Vitor Baptista		NC, All
(Italy) RP Motorsport	4	(Poland) Antoni Ptak Jr.	R	NC, All
(Italy) RP Motorsport	5	(Italy) Damiano Fioravanti		NC, All
(Italy) RP Motorsport	37	(Poland) Igor Waliłko	R	NC, All
(Italy) MKTG	2	(Russia) John Simonyan		NC, 1–3
(Italy) MKTG	2	(Thailand) Kantadhee Kusiri		6–8
(Spain) Campos Racing	6	(Russia) Konstantin Tereshchenko		NC, All
(Spain) Campos Racing	7	(Mexico) Diego Menchaca	R	NC, All
(Spain) Campos Racing	8	(Brazil) Henrique Baptista		NC, All
(Spain) Campos Racing	9	(Kuwait) Ahmad Al Ghanem	R	All
(United Kingdom) Motul Team West-Tec F3	10	(Israel) Yarin Stern		NC, All
(United Kingdom) Motul Team West-Tec F3	12	(India) Mahaveer Raghunathan	G	7
(United Kingdom) Motul Team West-Tec F3	12	(United Kingdom) Sam MacLeod	G	8
(United Kingdom) Motul Team West-Tec F3	15	(Thailand) Tanart Sathienthirakul		NC, All
(Spain) EmiliodeVillota Motorsport	16	(Japan) Yu Kanamaru		NC, All
(Spain) EmiliodeVillota Motorsport	17	(Mexico) José Manuel Vilalta	R	NC, All
(Spain) EmiliodeVillota Motorsport	18	(Russia) Aleksey Chuklin		NC
(Spain) EmiliodeVillota Motorsport	18	(Mexico) Luis Michael Dörrbecker		1–3
(Spain) EmiliodeVillota Motorsport	22	(Spain) Daniel Juncadella	G	8
(Spain) EmiliodeVillota Motorsport	27	(Spain) Otto Sánchez	R	1
(Italy) BVM Racing	19	(Colombia) William Barbosa		NC, 1–4, 6–7
(Italy) BVM Racing	20	(Italy) Alessio Rovera	R	NC
(Italy) BVM Racing	20	(Spain) Javier Cobián	R	1
(Italy) BVM Racing	30	(Italy) Alessio Rovera	R	2–4
(Italy) DAV Racing	21	(Italy) Alessio Rovera	R	1, 6–7
(Italy) DAV Racing	23	(China) Kang Ling	G	7–8
(Italy) DAV Racing	70	(India) Parth Ghorpade	R	5–7
(Italy) DAV Racing	77	(Italy) Leonardo Pulcini	R	NC, All
(Italy) Corbetta Competizioni	24	(Kosovo) Edi Haxhiu		NC
(Italy) Corbetta Competizioni	24	(Russia) Aleksey Chuklin		3–5
(Spain) Drivex School	28	(Austria) Ferdinand Habsburg	G	8

Icon	Legend
R	Rookie Trophy
G	Guest drivers ineligible to score points

== Race calendar and results ==
- An eight-round provisional calendar was revealed on 5 November 2014. On 2 December 2014, it was confirmed, that the third round would take place at Estoril. All rounds, except for Jerez, supported the International GT Open series, with rounds denoted with a blue background being part of the Spanish Formula Three Championship.

Round		Circuit	Date	Pole position	Fastest lap	Winning driver	Winning team	Rookie Winner
NC	R1	(France) Circuit Paul Ricard, Le Castellet	7 March	(Japan) Yu Kanamaru	(Italy) Alessio Rovera	(Japan) Yu Kanamaru	(Spain) EmiliodeVillota Motorsport	(Italy) Alessio Rovera
NC	R2	(France) Circuit Paul Ricard, Le Castellet	7 March		(Italy) Alessio Rovera	(Italy) Alessio Rovera	(Italy) BVM Racing	(Italy) Alessio Rovera
1	R1	(Spain) Circuito de Jerez	11 April	(Israel) Yarin Stern	(Brazil) Vitor Baptista	(Italy) Alessio Rovera	(Italy) DAV Racing	(Italy) Alessio Rovera
1	R2	(Spain) Circuito de Jerez	12 April	(Russia) Konstantin Tereshchenko	(Russia) Konstantin Tereshchenko	(Russia) Konstantin Tereshchenko	(Spain) Campos Racing	(Italy) Alessio Rovera
2	R1	(France) Circuit Paul Ricard, Le Castellet	25 April	(Brazil) Vitor Baptista	(Brazil) Vitor Baptista	(Brazil) Vitor Baptista	(Italy) RP Motorsport	(Italy) Alessio Rovera
2	R2	(France) Circuit Paul Ricard, Le Castellet	26 April	(Russia) Konstantin Tereshchenko	(Russia) Konstantin Tereshchenko	(Russia) Konstantin Tereshchenko	(Spain) Campos Racing	(Italy) Alessio Rovera
3	R1	(Portugal) Autódromo do Estoril	9 May	(Russia) Konstantin Tereshchenko	(Russia) Konstantin Tereshchenko	(Russia) Konstantin Tereshchenko	(Spain) Campos Racing	(Poland) Igor Waliłko
3	R2	(Portugal) Autódromo do Estoril	10 May	(Russia) Konstantin Tereshchenko	(Brazil) Vitor Baptista	(Brazil) Vitor Baptista	(Italy) RP Motorsport	(Italy) Leonardo Pulcini
4	R1	(United Kingdom) Silverstone Circuit	6 June	(Brazil) Vitor Baptista	(Brazil) Vitor Baptista	(Japan) Yu Kanamaru	(Spain) EmiliodeVillota Motorsport	(Italy) Alessio Rovera
4	R2	(United Kingdom) Silverstone Circuit	7 June	(Japan) Yu Kanamaru	(Russia) Konstantin Tereshchenko	(Russia) Konstantin Tereshchenko	(Spain) Campos Racing	(Italy) Leonardo Pulcini
5	R1	(Austria) Red Bull Ring, Spielberg	4 July	(Brazil) Vitor Baptista	(Russia) Konstantin Tereshchenko	(Italy) Leonardo Pulcini	(Italy) DAV Racing	(Italy) Leonardo Pulcini
5	R2	(Austria) Red Bull Ring, Spielberg	5 July	(Brazil) Vitor Baptista	(Brazil) Vitor Baptista	(Brazil) Vitor Baptista	(Italy) RP Motorsport	(Italy) Leonardo Pulcini
6	R1	(Belgium) Circuit de Spa-Francorchamps	5 September	(Russia) Konstantin Tereshchenko	(Brazil) Vitor Baptista	(Brazil) Vitor Baptista	(Italy) RP Motorsport	(Italy) Leonardo Pulcini
6	R2	(Belgium) Circuit de Spa-Francorchamps	6 September	(Brazil) Vitor Baptista	(Thailand) Kantadhee Kusiri	(Brazil) Vitor Baptista	(Italy) RP Motorsport	(Poland) Igor Waliłko
7	R1	(Italy) Autodromo Nazionale Monza	3 October	(Japan) Yu Kanamaru	(Italy) Damiano Fioravanti	(Brazil) Vitor Baptista	(Italy) RP Motorsport	(Mexico) Diego Menchaca
7	R2	(Italy) Autodromo Nazionale Monza	4 October	(Russia) Konstantin Tereshchenko	(Brazil) Vitor Baptista	(Italy) Damiano Fioravanti	(Italy) RP Motorsport	(Poland) Igor Waliłko
8	R1	(Spain) Circuit de Barcelona-Catalunya	31 October	(Russia) Konstantin Tereshchenko	(Japan) Yu Kanamaru	(Russia) Konstantin Tereshchenko	(Spain) Campos Racing	(Mexico) Diego Menchaca
8	R2	(Spain) Circuit de Barcelona-Catalunya	1 November	(Russia) Konstantin Tereshchenko	(Russia) Konstantin Tereshchenko	(Russia) Konstantin Tereshchenko	(Spain) Campos Racing	(Mexico) Diego Menchaca

== Championship standings ==
=== Euroformula Open Championship ===
==== Drivers' championship ====
- Only the fourteen best results counted towards the championship. Points were awarded as follows:

1	2	3	4	5	6	7	8	9	10	PP	FL
25	18	15	12	10	8	6	4	2	1	**1**	1

Pos	Driver	LEC1 (France)		JER (Spain)		LEC2 (France)		EST (Portugal)		SIL (United Kingdom)		RBR (Austria)		SPA (Belgium)		MNZ (Italy)		CAT (Spain)		Pts
1	(Brazil) Vitor Baptista	4	2	2	5	**1**	2	4	1	**2**	3	**Ret**	**1**	1	**1**	1	2	3	5	291
2	(Russia) Konstantin Tereshchenko	Ret	12	6	**1**	3	**1**	**1**	**2**	7	1	2	4	**2**	2	3	**Ret**	**1**	**1**	286
3	(Japan) Yu Kanamaru	**1**	3	4	2	4	7	3	4	1	**2**	Ret	3	4	11	**2**	5	2	6	206
4	(Thailand) Tanart Sathienthirakul	5	6	3	8	5	8	5	3	8	6	3	6	5	4	Ret	4	8	10	133
5	(Israel) Yarin Stern	Ret	Ret	**Ret**	3	6	9	2	Ret	4	10	4	2	8	6	Ret	8	7	8	119
6	(Italy) Alessio Rovera	3	1	1	6	2	3	13	10	3	5			6	Ret	Ret	11			100
7	(Italy) Damiano Fioravanti	9	Ret	7	15	8	4	6	6	6	12	7	8	17	Ret	Ret	1	9	7	96
8	(Mexico) Diego Menchaca	6	4	8	10	12	Ret	10	7	5	8	5	7	15	9	4	6	5	2	94
9	(Italy) Leonardo Pulcini	10	9	Ret	Ret	18	11	9	5	Ret	4	1	5	3	Ret	10	7	6	DNS	91
10	(Poland) Igor Waliłko	7	7	Ret	11	7	Ret	7	9	14	17	6	9	18	3	7	3	11	Ret	62
11	(Colombia) William Barbosa	16	DNS	5	9	11	6	Ret	11	9	9			10	7	5	Ret			41
12	(Guatemala) Andrés Saravia	11	5	Ret	7	10	5	8	8	16	7	9	Ret	9	13	8	14	13	13	41
13	(Poland) Antoni Ptak Jr.	14	11	12	17	16	13	16	13	10	13	Ret	Ret	7	5	Ret	12	16	11	19
14	(Russia) Dzhon Simonyan	2	DNS	14	4	9	Ret	Ret	DNS											14
15	(Brazil) Henrique Baptista	8	Ret	Ret	Ret	13	10	14	16	15	11	8	11	16	15	6	10	Ret	16	14
16	(Thailand) Kantadhee Kusiri													13	8	Ret	9	Ret	9	13
17	(Kuwait) Ahmad Al Ghanem			9	18	15	15	15	Ret	12	15	12	13	11	14	9	15	14	15	4
18	(India) Parth Ghorpade											10	12	12	10	11	Ret			2
19	(Mexico) José Manuel Vilalta	15	13	Ret	16	17	14	Ret	15	13	16	11	10	14	12	13	17	15	Ret	1
20	(Mexico) Luis Michael Dörrbecker			10	12	14	12	12	14											1
21	(Russia) Aleksey Chuklin	13	10					11	12	11	14	Ret	NC							0
22	(Spain) Javier Cobián			11	14															0
23	(Spain) Otto Sánchez			13	13															0
Guest drivers ineligible to score points
	(Spain) Daniel Juncadella																	4	3	0
	(Austria) Ferdinand Habsburg																	10	4	0
	(China) Kang Ling															12	13	Ret	12	0
	(United Kingdom) Sam MacLeod																	12	14	0
	(India) Mahaveer Raghunathan															14	16			0
Non-championship round-only drivers
	(Kosovo) Edi Haxhiu	12	8																	0
Pos	Driver	LEC1 (France)		JER (Spain)		LEC2 (France)		EST (Portugal)		SIL (United Kingdom)		RBR (Austria)		SPA (Belgium)		MNZ (Italy)		CAT (Spain)		Pts

Colour	Result
Gold	Winner
Silver	Second place
Bronze	Third place
Green	Points classification
Blue	Non-points classification
Blue	Non-classified finish (NC)
Purple	Retired, not classified (Ret)
Red	Did not qualify (DNQ)
Red	Did not pre-qualify (DNPQ)
Black	Disqualified (DSQ)
White	Did not start (DNS)
White	Withdrew (WD)
White	Race cancelled (C)
Blank	Did not practice (DNP)
Blank	Did not arrive (DNA)
Blank	Excluded (EX)

**Bold** – Pole
Italics – Fastest Lap

==== Teams' championship ====
- Points were awarded as follows:

1	2	3	4	5
10	8	6	4	3

Pos	Team	LEC1 (France)		JER (Spain)		LEC2 (France)		EST (Portugal)		SIL (United Kingdom)		RBR (Austria)		SPA (Belgium)		MNZ (Italy)		CAT (Spain)		Pts
1	(Italy) RP Motorsport	2	2	2	5	1	2	3	1	2	3	6	1	1	1	1	1	3	5	121
2	(Spain) Campos Racing	6	4	6	1	3	1	1	2	5	1	2	4	2	2	3	6	1	1	111
3	(Spain) EmiliodeVillota Motorsport	1	3	4	2	4	7	2	4	1	2	11	3	4	11	2	5	2	6	79
4	(United Kingdom) Motul Team West-Tec F3	5	6	3	3	5	8	4	3	4	6	3	2	5	4	14	4	7	8	54
5	(Italy) DAV Racing	10	9	1	6	18	11	8	5	Ret	4	1	5	3	10	10	7	6	DNS	39
6	(Italy) BVM Racing	3	1	5	9	2	3	12	10	3	5			10	7	5	Ret			29
7	(Italy) MKTG	2	DNS	14	4	9	Ret	Ret	DNS					13	8	Ret	9	Ret	9	4
8	(Italy) Corbetta Competizioni	12	8					10	12	11	14	Ret	NC							0
Guest teams ineligible to score points
	(Spain) Drivex School																	10	4	0
Pos	Team	LEC1 (France)		JER (Spain)		LEC2 (France)		EST (Portugal)		SIL (United Kingdom)		RBR (Austria)		SPA (Belgium)		MNZ (Italy)		CAT (Spain)		Pts

=== Spanish Formula Three Championship ===
==== Drivers' championship ====
- Points were awarded as follows:

1	2	3	4	5	6	7	8	9	10	PP	FL
25	18	15	12	10	8	6	4	2	1	**1**	1

Pos	Driver	JER (Spain)		EST (Portugal)		CAT (Spain)		Pts
1	(Russia) Konstantin Tereshchenko	6	**1**	**1**	**2**	**1**	**1**	134
2	(Brazil) Vitor Baptista	2	5	4	1	3	5	97
3	(Japan) Yu Kanamaru	4	2	3	4	2	6	88
4	(Thailand) Tanart Sathienthirakul	3	8	5	3	8	10	56
5	(Israel) Yarin Stern	**Ret**	3	2	Ret	7	8	50
6	(Mexico) Diego Menchaca	8	10	10	7	5	2	42
7	(Italy) Damiano Fioravanti	7	15	6	6	9	7	36
8	(Italy) Alessio Rovera	1	6	13	10			34
9	(Italy) Leonardo Pulcini	Ret	Ret	9	5	6	DNS	22
10	(Guatemala) Andres Saravia	Ret	7	8	8	13	13	17
11	(Russia) Dzhon Simonyan	14	4	Ret	DNS			12
12	(Colombia) William Barbosa	5	9	Ret	11			12
13	(Poland) Igor Waliłko	Ret	11	7	9	11	Ret	10
14	(Poland) Antoni Ptak	12	17	16	13	16	11	4
15	(Kuwait) Ahmad Al Ghanem	9	18	15	Ret	14	15	3
16	(Mexico) Luis Michael Dörrbecker	10	12	12	14			1
17	(Russia) Aleksey Chuklin			11	12			0
18	(Spain) Javier Cobián	11	14					0
19	(Spain) Otto Sánchez	13	13					0
20	(Brazil) Henrique Baptista	Ret	Ret	14	16	Ret	16	0
21	(Mexico) Jose Manuel Vilalta	Ret	16	Ret	15	15	Ret	0
Guest drivers ineligible to score points
	(Spain) Daniel Juncadella					4	3	0
	(Austria) Ferdinand Habsburg					10	4	0
	(Thailand) Kantadhee Kusiri					Ret	9	0
	(United Kingdom) Sam MacLeod					12	14	0
	(China) Kang Ling					Ret	12	0
Pos	Driver	JER (Spain)		EST (Portugal)		CAT (Spain)		Pts

==== Teams' championship ====
- Points were awarded as follows:

1	2	3	4	5
10	8	6	4	3

Pos	Team	JER (Spain)		EST (Portugal)		CAT (Spain)		Pts
1	(Spain) Campos Racing	6	1	1	2	1	1	48
2	(Italy) RP Motorsport	2	5	4	1	3	5	39
3	(Spain) EmiliodeVillota Motorsport	4	2	3	4	2	6	36
4	(United Kingdom) Motul Team West-Tec F3	3	3	5	3	7	8	22
5	(Italy) DAV Racing	1	6	9	5	6	DNS	16
6	(Italy) MKTG	14	4	Ret	DNS	Ret	9	4
7	(Italy) BVM Racing	5	9	13	10			3
8	(Italy) Corbetta Competizioni			11	12			0
Guest teams ineligible to score points
	(Spain) Drivex School					10	4	0
Pos	Team	JER (Spain)		EST (Portugal)		CAT (Spain)		Pts
