= Vitor Baptista (racing driver) =

Brazilian racing driver

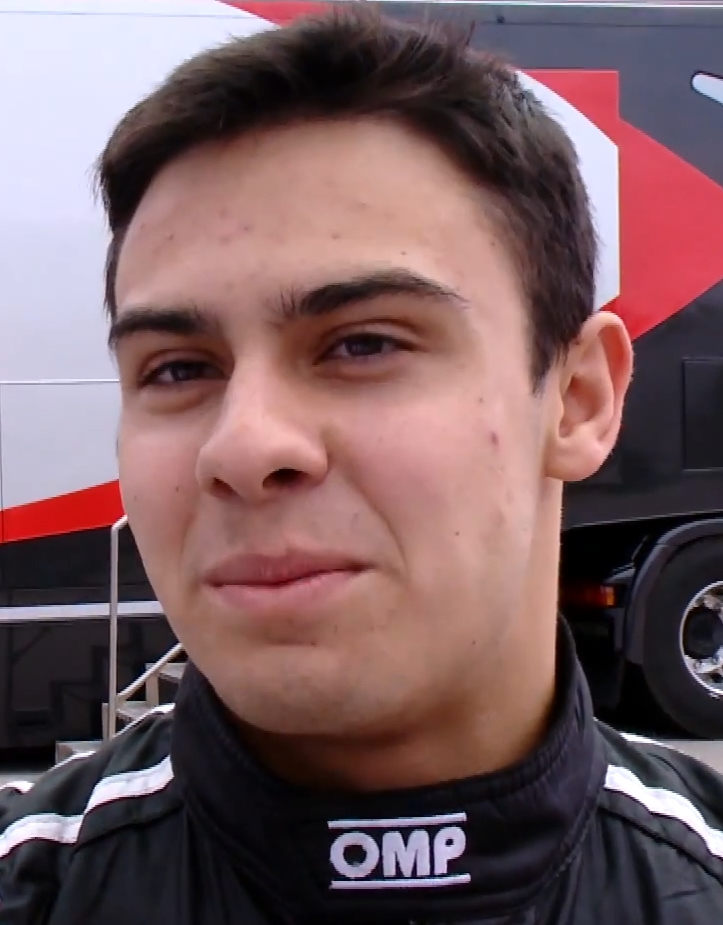
- Baptista in April 2015
- Nationality: (Brazil) Brazilian
- Born: 20 March 1998 (age 28) São Paulo, Brazil

Formula V8 3.5 career
- Debut season: 2016
- Current team: RP Motorsport
- Car number: 22
- Starts: 18
- Wins: 0
- Poles: 0
- Fastest laps: 0
- Best finish: 12th in 2016

Previous series
- 2015 2014: Euroformula Open Championship; Fórmula 3 Brasil Class B

Championship titles
- 2015 2014: Euroformula Open Championship; Fórmula 3 Brasil Class B

Vitor Baptista (born 20 March 1998) is a Brazilian racing driver. He was Euroformula Open champion in 2015, and reached the Formula V8 3.5 Series with RP Motorsport. He last competed in the Stock Car Pro Series, winning once for Scuderia Chiarelli in 2024.

== Career ==
=== Karting ===
Prior to his single-seater career, Baptista enjoyed a successful period in karting in his native Brazil. He won consecutive Super Kart Brazil junior titles in 2011 and 2012 and also finished second in the Brazilian Karting Championship junior class in 2011. He also went on to finish seventh in the CIK-FIA KF3 World Cup in 2012.

=== Formula Three ===
Baptista made his single-seater debut in 2014, racing in the B Class of the Brazilian Formula Three Championship for the Cesário F3 team. He won the championship comfortably from compatriot Matheus Leist, earning thirteen class wins out of sixteen races whilst also taking three overall race victories.

For 2015, Baptista moved to Europe to compete in the Euroformula Open Championship, racing for reigning champions RP Motorsport. He secured the championship title at the final round of the season in Barcelona, finishing five points ahead of Russian Konstantin Tereshchenko after taking race victories at Paul Ricard, Estoril, Red Bull Ring, Spa-Francorchamps and Monza. He also finished second to Tereshchenko in the accompanying Spanish Formula Three Championship, which was held within the main championship at the Jerez, Estoril and Barcelona rounds.

=== Formula V8 3.5 ===
Baptista would continue to race for RP Motorsport in 2016, graduating to Formula V8 3.5.

== Racing record ==
=== Career summary ===
Season	Series	Team	Races	Wins	Poles	F/Laps	Podiums	Points	Position
2014	Fórmula 3 Brasil - Class B	Cesário F3	16	13	4	14	14	207	**1st**
2015	Euroformula Open Championship	RP Motorsport	16	6	5	7	12	291	**1st**
2015	Spanish Formula 3 Championship	RP Motorsport	6	1	0	2	4	97	**2nd**
2016	Formula V8 3.5 Series	RP Motorsport	18	0	0	0	0	51	12th
2017	Campeonato Brasileiro de Turismo	Full Time	11	1	0	3	4	114	7th
2017	Fórmula 3 Brasil - Class A	Full Time	2	0	1	0	1	9	11th
2018	Porsche GT3 Cup Brasil - 3.8 Class	N/A	12	4	0	1	7	182	**1st**
2018	Porsche Endurance Series	N/A	3	0	0	0	0	157	5th
2019	Porsche GT3 Cup Brasil	N/A	10	3	1	2	6	154	4th
2019	Stock Car Brasil	Shell V-Power	2	0	0	0	0	7	32nd
2019	Stock Car Light	SG Racing	2	1	0	1	1	39	22nd
2019	Porsche Endurance Series	N/A	1	1	0	0	1	116	8th
2020	Stock Car Brasil	KTF Sports	2	0	0	0	0	8	27th
2021	Porsche Endurance Series	?	3	0	0	2	0	?	?
2021	Stock Car Light	Hot Car Competições	2	0	0	0	0	0	NC
2022	Stock Car Pro Series	KTF Racing	1	0	0	0	0	0	NC†
2024	Stock Car Pro Series	Scuderia Chiarelli	22	1	0	0	1	391	25th
2026	Stock Car Pro Series	Sterling Racing	1	0	0	0	0	0	NC*

^{†} As Baptista was a guest driver, he was ineligible to score points. ^{*} Season still in progress.

=== Complete Formula 3 Brasil results ===
(key) (Races in bold indicate pole position) (Races in italics indicate fastest lap)

Year	Entrant	Class	1	2	3	4	5	6	7	8	9	10	11	12	13	14	15	16	Pos	Points
2014	Cesário F3	B	**TAR**; **1**; 4	TAR; 2; 3	SCS; 1; 4	SCS; 2; 1	**BRA**; **1**; 5	BRA; 2; 2	**INT**; **1**; 2	INT; 2; 2	**CUR1**; **1**; 2	CUR1; 2; 2	VEL; 1 NC	VEL; 2; 1	CUR2; 1; 2	CUR2; 2; 1	GOI; 1 Ret	GOI; 2; 6	1st	207
2017	Full Time	A	**CUR**; **1** Ret	CUR; 2; 3	INT1; 1	INT1; 2	VEC; 1	VEC; 2	INT2; 1	INT2; 2	SCS; 1	SCS; 2	LON; 1	LON; 2	GOI; 1	GOI; 2	INT3; 1	INT3; 2	11th	9

=== Complete Euroformula Open Championship results ===
(key) (Races in bold indicate pole position) (Races in italics indicate fastest lap)

Year	Entrant	1	2	3	4	5	6	7	8	9	10	11	12	13	14	15	16	Pos	Points
2015	RP Motorsport	JER; 1; 2	JER; 2; 5	**LEC**; **1**; 1	LEC; 2; 2	EST; 1; 4	EST; 2; 1	**SIL**; **1**; 2	SIL; 2; 3	**RBR**; **1** Ret	**RBR**; **2**; 1	SPA; 1; 1	**SPA**; **2**; 1	MNZ; 1; 1	MNZ; 2; 2	CAT; 1; 3	CAT; 2; 5	1st	291

=== Complete Formula V8 3.5 Series results ===
(key) (Races in bold indicate pole position) (Races in italics indicate fastest lap)

Year	Team	1	2	3	4	5	6	7	8	9	10	11	12	13	14	15	16	17	18	Pos.	Points
2016	RP Motorsport	ALC; 1; 8	ALC; 2; 11	HUN; 1; 10	HUN; 2 Ret	SPA; 1; 6	SPA; 2; 4	LEC; 1 Ret	LEC; 2 Ret	SIL; 1; 8	SIL; 2; 8	RBR; 1; 10	RBR; 2; 8	MNZ; 1; 8	MNZ; 2 Ret	JER; 1; 11	JER; 2; 11	CAT; 1; 6	CAT; 2 Ret	12th	51

=== Complete Stock Car Pro Series results ===
Year	Team	Car	1	2	3	4	5	6	7	8	9	10	11	12	13	14	15	16	17	18	19	20	21	22	23	24	Rank	Points
2019	Shell V-Power	Chevrolet Cruze	VEL; 1	VCA; 1 Ret	VCA; 2; 14	GOI; 1	GOI; 2	LON; 1	LON; 2	SCZ; 1	SCZ; 2	MOU; 1	MOU; 2	INT; 1	VEL; 1	VEL; 2	CAS; 1	CAS; 2	VCA; 1	VCA; 2	GOI; 1	GOI; 2	INT; 1				32nd	7
2020	KTF Sports	Chevrolet Cruze	GOI; 1	GOI; 2	INT; 1; 17	INT; 2; 17	LON; 1	LON; 2	CAS; 1	CAS; 2	CAS; 3	VCA; 1	VCA; 2	CUR; 1	CUR; 2	CUR; 3	GOI; 1	GOI; 2	GOI; 2	INT; 1							27th	8
2022	KTF Racing	Chevrolet Cruze	INT; 1; 24	GOI; 1	GOI; 2	RIO; 1	RIO; 2	VCA; 1	VCA; 2	BRA; 1	BRA; 2	BRA; 1	BRA; 2	INT; 1	INT; 2	SCZ; 1	SCZ; 2	VCA; 1	VCA; 2	GOI; 1	GOI; 2	GOI; 1	GOI; 2	BRA; 1	BRA; 2		NC†	0†
2024	Scuderia Chiarelli	Toyota Corolla	GOI; 1	GOI; 2	VCA; 1; 17	INT; 1; 24	INT; 2; 14	CAS; 1; 23	CAS; 2 Ret	VCA; 1; 19	VCA; 2; 17	VCA; 3; 25	GOI; 1; 18	GOI; 2; 16	BLH; 1; 8	BLH; 2 Ret	VEL; 1; 7	VEL; 2; 1	BUE; 1; 19	BUE; 2; 16	URU; 1; 14	URU; 2; 23	GOI; 1; 16	GOI; 2; 20	INT; 1; 21	INT; 2; 20	25th	391
2026	Sterling Racing	Mitsubishi Eclipse Cross	CRS; 1	CRS; 2	CAS; 1	CAS; 2	INT; 1	INT; 2	GOI; 1	GOI; 2	CUI; 1	CUI; 2	VCA; 1	VCA; 2	SCZ; 1	SCZ; 2	CRS; 1	CRS; 2	BRA; 1 Ret	CAS; 1	CAS; 2	VEL; 1	VEL; 2	INT; 1	INT; 2		NC*	0*

^{†} As Baptista was a guest driver, he was ineligible to score points. ^{*} Season still in progress.

Sporting positions
Preceded by None	Fórmula 3 Brasil; Class B Champion; 2014	Succeeded by Guilherme Samaia
Preceded by Sandy Stuvik	Euroformula Open Championship; Champion; 2015	Succeeded by Leonardo Pulcini
