= Ryan Verra =

Canadian race car driver

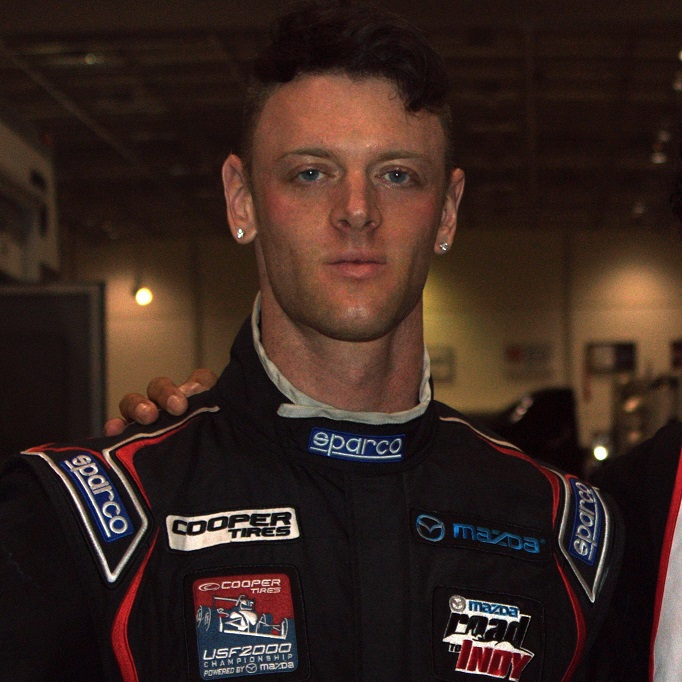
- Born: 2 October 1982 (age 44) Calgary, Alberta, Canada

N/A career
- Debut season: 2013
- Former teams: RR Racing; Alliance Autosport
- Best finish: 2nd in 2013 U.S. F2000 National Championship, National Class

Previous series
- 2014 2013: Fórmula 3 Brasil Series; U.S. F2000 National Championship
- Statistics up to date as of January 14, 2015.

Ryan Verra is a Canadian entrepreneur and professional race car driver from Calgary. In 2014 he became the first Canadian driver to race in the Fórmula 3 Brasil Series, earning 2 podium finishes for the season and becoming the first Canadian with a podium finish in Brazil since Jacques Villeneuve in 1997.

== Early life ==
Verra was born in 1982 in Calgary, Alberta, Canada. He began with sports at an early age, starting with motocross at the age of eight as well as various forms of martial arts.

== Career ==
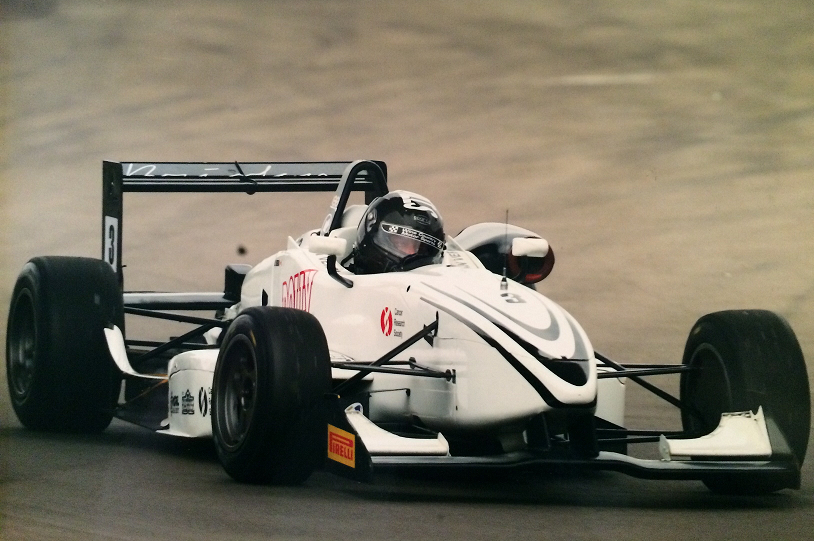
Ryan Verra in his debut race in Brazil in 2014.

Verra began his career in martial arts, marketing, and television. He opened his own fight club and numerous gyms, teaching and training in mixed martial arts. Verra performed a martial arts event at Stampede Corral in 2008. After the event, he was approached by a television company who hired him to produce a television show related to martial arts. Verra produced the lifestyle news show which aired for one year on the Fight Network.

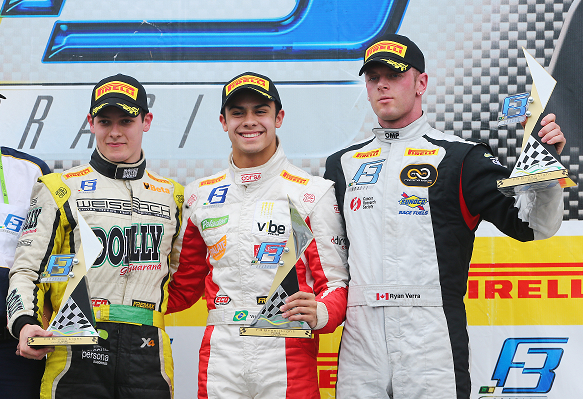
Ryan Verra (far right) with a podium finish at Velopark in 2014.

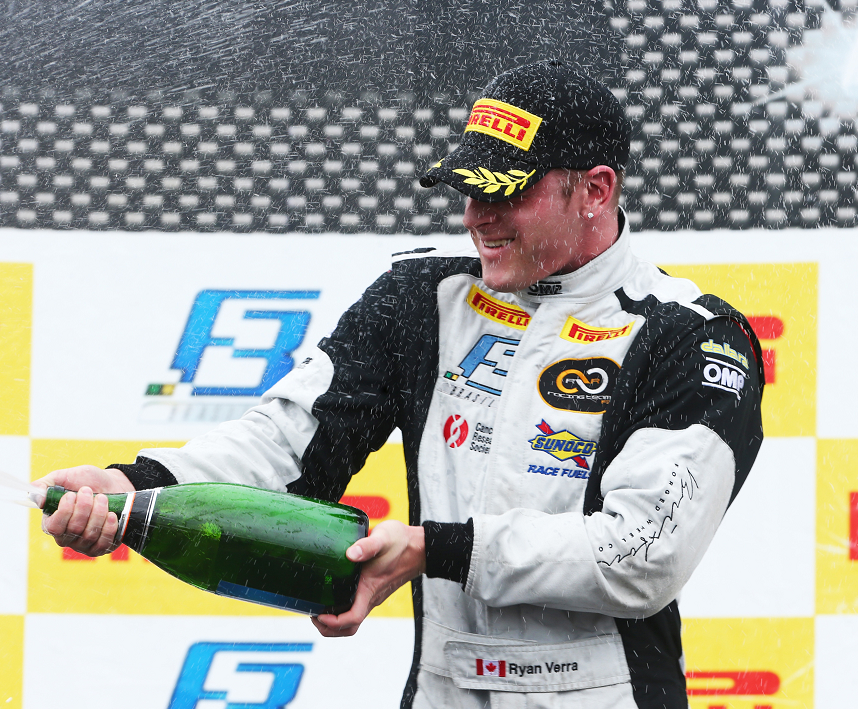
Ryan Verra celebrating a podium finish in Brazil in 2014.

Verra began a new venture when he took up auto sports as a professional race car driver. He began his career with numerous top-ten finishes in both the Skip Barber F2000 Series as well as the F1000 Championship. In 2012 he was invited to test with Afterburner Autosport at the Indianapolis Motor Speedway before joining the team of Alliance Autosport in 2013. Verra had no Karting experience prior to joining Alliance, making his debut in the American 2013 U.S. F2000 National Championship, an open wheel racing series that is part of the Road to Indy. He drove the season in a Van Diemen DP06 Formula SCCA Mazda. He had a total of 12 podium finishes, with his first career win in the National Class coming at Mazda Raceway Laguna Seca. He also suffered a crash in the Grand Prix of St. Petersburg before returning to racing two races later. Prior to 2014, Verra had LASIK to correct his vision. The surgery was unsuccessful, leaving his right eye unable to see clearly and he was not cleared to race. He rehabilitated the eye and was able to return to racing for 2014.

In 2014, Verra signed with RR Racing to race for the 2014 Fórmula 3 Brasil season. This was the first season for the series since 1995 and replaced the Formula 3 Sudamericana as the highest profile Formula series in South America. Verra drove a Dallara F301 with Pirelli Tyres and a Berta engine. He had a podium appearance at Velopark that was later disputed. He returned to Brazil later that year and raced in the final round of the series at Autódromo Internacional Ayrton Senna where he had two more podium finishes. He finished in eighth place for the series and was the first and only Canadian driver in the series. He was also the first Canadian driver to reach a podium in any race in Brazil since Jacques Villeneuve did it in 1997.

== Racing statistics ==
=== 2014 Fórmula 3 Brasil (Class B) ===
Year	Team	1	2	3	4	5	6	7	8	9	10	11	12	13	14	15	16	Rank	Points
2014	RR Racing	TAR	TAR	SCS	SCS	BRA	BRA	INT	INT	CUR	CUR	VEL; 14	VEL; DSQ	CUR	CUR	GOI; 9	GOI; 8	8th	21
2015	RR Racing	CUR1; 1	CUR1; 2	VEL; 1 Ret	VEL; 2; 9	SCS; 1; 6	SCS; 2; 11	CUR2; 1	CUR2; 2	CAS; 1; 9	CAS; 2 Ret	CGR; 1	CGR; 2	CUR3; 1; 10	CUR3; 2 Ret	INT; 1 Ret	INT; 2; 8	10th	15

=== 2013 U.S. F2000 National Championship (National Class) ===
Year	Team	1	2	3	4	5	6	7	8	9	10	11	12	13	14	Rank	Points
2013	Alliance Autosport	SEB; 28	SEB; 23	STP; 19	STP; DNS	LOR	TOR; 21	TOR; 26	MOH; 26	MOH; 24	MOH; 17	LS; 17	LS; 19	HOU; 17	HOU; 19	**2nd**	**206**

Colour	Result
Gold	Winner
Silver	Second place
Bronze	Third place
Green	Points classification
Blue	Non-points classification
Blue	Non-classified finish (NC)
Purple	Retired, not classified (Ret)
Red	Did not qualify (DNQ)
Red	Did not pre-qualify (DNPQ)
Black	Disqualified (DSQ)
White	Did not start (DNS)
White	Withdrew (WD)
White	Race cancelled (C)
Blank	Did not practice (DNP)
Blank	Did not arrive (DNA)
Blank	Excluded (EX)

**Bold** – Pole
Italics – Fastest Lap

== Philanthropy ==
Verra has been involved in philanthropy, partnering with the Cancer Research Society to launch a campaign called Driven 2 Research. The charity raises money and awareness for cancer research in Canada. He also supported and walked the runway in the Heart Truth Fundraiser with CTV Sports anchor Lisa Bowes in 2014. The event was for the Heart and Stroke Foundation of Canada, with Verra making a donation on behalf of his Grandmother's heart attack survival and donated a 2-seater IndyCar ride to the event.
