= RP Motorsport =

Racing team

(Italy) RP Motorsport
- Founded: 1998
- Folded: 2022
- Base: Piacenza, Italy
- Team principal(s): Fabio Pampado; Carlo Roscio; Francesco Roscio; Graziano Rocca
- Former series: Eurocup Formula Renault 2.0; Italian Formula Renault Championship; Auto GP; Formula Junior; Formula Opel Lotus; Formula V8 3.5; European F3 Open Championship; Indy Pro 2000 Championship; Formula Regional European Championship; Italian F4 Championship
- Teams' Championships: Formula Junior; 1998; 1999; Euroformula Open Championship; 2012 2013 2014 2015 2017 2018; Spanish Formula 3 Championship; 2017 2018
- Drivers' Championships: Euroformula Open Championship; 2012: Niccolò Schirò; 2014: Sandy Stuvik; 2015: Vitor Baptista; 2017: Harrison Scott; 2018: Felipe Drugovich; Spanish Formula 3 Championship; 2018: Felipe Drugovich; Indy Pro 2000 Championship; 2019: Kyle Kirkwood

RP Motorsport was an auto racing team based in Italy in Piacenza.

The Italian team won many times the EuroFormula Open Championship, becoming one of the most successful outfit in the series.

In February 2022 the team assets were sold to Irish racing driver Keith Donegan.

== Former series results ==
=== Formula Regional European Championship ===
Year	Car	Drivers	Races	Wins	Poles	F/Laps	Points	D.C.	T.C.
2019	Tatuus F3 T-318-Alfa Romeo	(Brazil) Igor Fraga	23	4	4	3	300	3rd	2nd
2019	Tatuus F3 T-318-Alfa Romeo	(Mexico) Raúl Guzmán	24	0	0	0	180	6th	2nd
2020	Tatuus F3 T-318-Alfa Romeo	(Italy) Emidio Pesce	22	0	0	0	50	12th	4th
2020	Tatuus F3 T-318-Alfa Romeo	(Guatemala) Ian Rodriguez	3	1	0	0	45	13th	4th
2021	Tatuus F3 T-318-Alpine	(Italy) Emidio Pesce	19	0	0	0	0	37th	12th
2021	Tatuus F3 T-318-Alpine	(Spain) Brad Benavides	10	0	0	0	0	26th	12th

=== Italian F4 Championship ===
Year	Car	Driver	Races	Wins	Poles	F/Laps	Points	D.C.	T.C.
2019	Tatuus F4-T014	(Mexico) Santiago Ramos	9	0	0	0	0	41st	12th
2020	Tatuus F4-T014	(Portugal) Pedro Perino	2	0	0	0	0	44th	16th
2021	Tatuus F4-T014	(Portugal) Pedro Perino †	21	0	0	0	1	33rd	12th

†Perino drove for US Racing from round 5 onwards.

=== Pro Mazda/Indy Pro 2000 Championship ===
Year	Car	Driver	Races	Wins	Poles	F/Laps	Points	D.C.	T.C.
2018	Tatuus-Mazda PM-18	(United Kingdom) Harrison Scott	12	2	1	0	223	8th	5th
2018	Tatuus-Mazda PM-18	(Brazil) Felipe Drugovich	2	0	0	0	31	20th	5th
2018	Tatuus-Mazda PM-18	(Italy) Lodovico Laurini	7	0	0	0	84	14th	5th
2018	Tatuus-Mazda PM-18	(Mexico) Raúl Guzmán	4	0	0	0	51	17th	5th
2018	Tatuus-Mazda PM-18	(Colombia) Mathias Soler-Obel	3	0	0	0	48	18th	5th
2019	Tatuus-Mazda PM-18	(Italy) Damiano Fioravanti	2	0	0	0	22	18th	2nd
2019	Tatuus-Mazda PM-18	(Guatemala) Ian Rodriguez	8	0	0	1	132	13th	2nd
2019	Tatuus-Mazda PM-18	(Russia) Artem Petrov	5	0	0	0	72	15th	2nd
2019	Tatuus-Mazda PM-18	(United States) Kyle Kirkwood	16	9	6	7	419	1st	2nd
2019	Tatuus-Mazda PM-18	(Canada) Antonio Serravalle	14	0	0	0	188	10th	2nd
2021	Tatuus-Mazda PM-18	(Brazil) Enzo Fittipaldi	2	0	0	0	20	19th	8th
2021	Tatuus-Mazda PM-18	(United Kingdom) Enaam Ahmed †	9	0	0	1	138	12th	8th

†Ahmed competed for Juncos Racing from round 17 onwards.

=== Spanish Formula 3/European F3 Open/Euroformula Open ===
Spanish Formula 3 Championship
Year	Car	Drivers	Races	Wins	Poles	F/Laps	Points	D.C.	T.C.
2008	Dallara F308-FPT	(Spain) Víctor García	8	0	0	0	35	15th†	5th
2008	Dallara F308-FPT	(Italy) Nicola de Marco	17	2	0	0	74	4th	5th
2008	Dallara F308-FPT	(Italy) David Fumanelli	3	0	0	0	0	N/A	5th
2008	Dallara F306-FPT	(Spain) Xavi Barrio [C]	6	0	0	0	0	N/A [C]	5th
2008	Dallara F306-FPT	(Argentina) Augusto Scalbi [C]	3	0	0	0	3	14th [C]	5th
2008	Dallara F306-FPT	(Italy) Stefano Bizzarri [C]	8	1	0	0	3	15th [C]	5th
European F3 Open Championship
2009	Dallara F308-FPT	(Italy) David Fumanelli	16	2	0	0	42	8th	3rd
2009	Dallara F308-FPT	(Italy) Kevin Ceccon	16	0	0	0	33	12th	3rd
2009	Dallara F308-FPT	(Italy) Stefano Bizzarri	14	1	0	0	92	3rd	3rd
2009	Dallara F306-FPT; Dallara F308-FPT	(Finland) Jesse Krohn	4	0	0	0	10	17th	3rd
2009	Dallara F306-FPT	(Venezuela) Biagio Bulnes [C]	14	0	0	0	24	8th [C]	3rd
2010	Dallara F308-Toyota	(Venezuela) Biagio Bulnes	16	0	0	0	31	11th	3rd
2010	Dallara F308-Toyota	(Italy) Kevin Ceccon	16	1	0	0	92	4th	3rd
2010	Dallara F308-Toyota	(Italy) David Fumanelli	16	3	3	2	112	3rd	3rd
2010	Dallara F308-Toyota	(Italy) Matteo Beretta	8	0	0	0	16	17th	3rd
2010	Dallara F308-Toyota	(Spain) Pedro Quesada [C]	8	0	0	0	27	7th [C]	3rd
2011	Dallara F308-Toyota	(Italy) Niccolò Schirò	16	0	0	1	66	5th	2nd
2011	Dallara F308-Toyota	(Italy) David Fumanelli	16	5	4	4	115	2nd	2nd
2011	Dallara F308-Toyota	(Italy) Matteo Beretta	16	0	0	0	34	11th	2nd
2011	Dallara F308-Toyota	(Colombia) Francisco Diaz [C]	12	0	0	0	52	4th [C]	2nd
2011	Dallara F308-Toyota	(Italy) Matteo Davenia	16	0	0	0	8	19th	2nd
2012	Dallara F312-Toyota	(Canada) Gianmarco Raimondo	16	4	5	3	267	2nd	1st
2012	Dallara F312-Toyota	(Italy) Niccolò Schirò	16	4	3	6	272	1st	1st
2012	Dallara F308-Toyota; Dallara F312-Toyota	(Italy) Michela Cerruti	6	0	0	0	0	30th	1st
2012	Dallara F308-Toyota	(Spain) Alexander Boquoi [C]	6	0	0	0	29	7th [C]†	1st
2012	Dallara F308-Toyota	(Venezuela) Trino Raúl Rojas [C]	16	0	0	0	13	9th [C]	1st
2012	Dallara F308-Toyota	(Finland) Kristian Laine [G]	2	0	0	0	0	N/A	1st
2013	Dallara F312-Toyota	(Thailand) Sandy Stuvik	16	3	3	3	274	2nd	1st
2013	Dallara F312-Toyota	(Uruguay) Santiago Urrutia	16	2	1	3	191	4th	1st
2013	Dallara F312-Toyota	(Spain) Alexander Toril	16	0	1	1	158	5th	1st
2013	Dallara F312-Toyota	(France) Alexandre Cougnaud	16	1	1	1	139	6th	1st
2013	Dallara F308-Toyota	(Saudi Arabia) Saud Al Faisal [C]	16	0	0	0	3	13th [C]	1st
2013	Dallara F308-Toyota	(Italy) Costantino Peroni [C]	2	0	0	0	0	16th [C]	1st
Euroformula Open Championship
2014	Dallara F312-Toyota	(Thailand) Sandy Stuvik	16	11	10	5	332	1st	1st
2014	Dallara F312-Toyota	(Poland) Artur Janosz	16	2	3	4	243	2nd	1st
2014	Dallara F312-Toyota	(Guatemala) Andrés Saravia	16	0	0	0	61	8th	1st
2014	Dallara F312-Toyota	(Russia) Dzhon Simonyan	16	0	0	0	38	11th	1st
2014	Dallara F308-Toyota; Dallara F312-Toyota	(Saudi Arabia) Saud Al Faisal	16	0	0	0	6	21st	1st
2014	Dallara F308-Toyota	(Italy) Costantino Peroni [C]	4	3	0	0	38	1st [C]	1st
2015	Dallara F312-Toyota	(Guatemala) Andrés Saravia	16	0	0	0	41	12th	1st
2015	Dallara F312-Toyota	(Brazil) Vitor Baptista	16	6	5	7	291	1st	1st
2015	Dallara F312-Toyota	(Poland) Antoni Ptak Jr.	16	0	0	0	19	13th	1st
2015	Dallara F312-Toyota	(Italy) Damiano Fioravanti	16	1	0	1	96	7th	1st
2015	Dallara F312-Toyota	(Poland) Igor Waliłko	16	0	0	0	62	10th	1st
2015	Dallara F312-Toyota	(Russia) Dzhon Simonyan	6	0	0	0	14	14th	7th
2015	Dallara F312-Toyota	(Thailand) Kantadhee Kusiri	6	0	0	1	13	16th	7th
2016	Dallara F312-Toyota	(Poland) Antoni Ptak Jr.	15	1	0	1	94	6th	3rd
2016	Dallara F312-Toyota	(Thailand) Kantadhee Kusiri	16	0	0	0	21	17th	3rd
2016	Dallara F312-Toyota	(Italy) Damiano Fioravanti	16	0	1	0	136	5th	3rd
2016	Dallara F312-Toyota	(United Kingdom) Jack Aitken	4	2	2	1	71	8th	3rd
2016	Dallara F312-Toyota	(United Kingdom) Enaam Ahmed	6	0	0	0	49	11th†	3rd
2016	Dallara F312-Toyota	(Colombia) Tatiana Calderón	6	0	0	0	66	9th†	3rd
2016	Dallara F312-Toyota	(Thailand) Tanart Sathienthirakul	16	0	0	0	80	7th	3rd
2017	Dallara F312-Toyota	(Germany) Jannes Fittje	6	0	0	0	159	5th†	1st
2017	Dallara F312-Toyota	(Italy) Lodovico Laurini	16	0	0	0	6	18th	1st
2017	Dallara F312-Toyota	(United Kingdom) Harrison Scott	14	12	11	9	340	1st	1st
2017	Dallara F312-Toyota	(Brazil) Felipe Drugovich	2	1	1	0	0	NC	1st
2017	Dallara F312-Toyota	(Poland) Alex Karkosik	16	0	0	1	98	8th	1st
2018	Dallara F312-Toyota	(Poland) Alex Karkosik	2	0	0	0	66	8th†	1st
2018	Dallara F312-Toyota	(Netherlands) Leonard Hoogenboom	4	0	0	0	9	18th	1st
2018	Dallara F312-Toyota	(United States) Kaylen Frederick	4	0	0	1	21	14th	1st
2018	Dallara F312-Toyota	(Germany) David Schumacher	4	0	0	0	0	NC	1st
2018	Dallara F312-Toyota	(Morocco) Michaël Benyahia	6	0	0	0	9	19th	1st
2018	Dallara F312-Toyota	(Italy) Leonardo Lorandi	2	0	0	0	20	15th	1st
2018	Dallara F312-Toyota	(Brazil) Christian Hahn	2	0	0	0	29	10th†	1st
2018	Dallara F312-Toyota	(Brazil) Felipe Drugovich	16	14	10	10	405	1st	1st
2018	Dallara F312-Toyota	(Italy) Alessandro Bracalente	2	0	0	0	0	NC	1st
2018	Dallara F312-Toyota	(Italy) Aldo Festante	4	0	0	0	29	9th†	1st
2018	Dallara F312-Toyota	(Brazil) Guilherme Samaia	16	0	0	0	94	6th	1st
2019	Dallara F317-Toyota; Dallara F317-Volkswagen	(Mexico) Javier González	7	0	0	0	22	17th	6th
2019	Dallara F317-Toyota; Dallara F317-Volkswagen	(France) Pierre-Louis Chovet	7	0	0	0	2	23rd	6th
2019	Dallara F317-Toyota	(Russia) Artem Petrov	2	0	0	0	0	28th	6th
2019	Dallara F317-Volkswagen	(United States) Kyle Kirkwood	2	0	0	0	0	NC	6th
2019	Dallara F317-Volkswagen	(Italy) Lorenzo Ferrari	2	0	0	0	0	NC	6th

† Shared results with other teams

* Season still in progress

=== Italian Formula 3 ===
Italian Formula Three Championship
Year	Car	Drivers	Races	Wins	Poles	F/Laps	Points	D.C.	T.C.
2003	Dallara F302-Opel	(Italy) Giovanni Berton	6	0	0	0	32	10th	N/A
2003	Dallara F302-Opel	(Italy) Franco Ghiotto	1	0	0	0	0	N/A	N/A
2003	Dallara F302-Opel	(Italy) Matteo Cressoni	6	0	0	0	19	11th	N/A
2005	Lola-Dome F106-Opel	(Italy) Marcello Puglisi	1	0	0	0	3	16th	N/A
2008	Dallara F308-FPT	(Belgium) Nico Verdonck	8	0	0	1	26	8th	N/A
2008	Dallara F308-FPT	(South Africa) Jimmy Auby	2	0	0	0	0	24th	N/A
2009	Dallara F308-FPT	(Italy) Kevin Ceccon	6	0	0	0	11	14th	N/A
2009	Dallara F308-FPT	(Italy) David Fumanelli	4	0	0	0	0	22nd	N/A
2009	Dallara F306-FPT	(Venezuela) Biagio Bulnes [T]	6	0	0	0	0	23rd	N/A
2010	Dallara F308-FPT	(Finland) Jesse Krohn	14	1	0	0	66	7th	N/A
2010	Dallara F308-FPT	(Italy) David Fumanelli	2	0	0	0	2	20th	N/A
2010	Dallara F308-FPT	(Italy) Stefano Bizzarri	4	0	0	0	0	25th	N/A
2010	Dallara F308-FPT	(Italy) Kevin Ceccon	2	0	0	0	0	28th	N/A
2010	Dallara F308-FPT	(Venezuela) Biagio Bulnes	2	0	0	0	0	33rd	N/A
2011	Dallara F308-FPT	(Italy) Daniel Mancinelli	8	1	0	0	30	11th	5th
2011	Dallara F308-FPT	(Finland) Jesse Krohn	4	0	0	0	8	14th	5th
2011	Dallara F308-FPT	(Italy) Niccolò Schirò	2	0	0	0	1	16th	5th
2011	Dallara F308-FPT	(Italy) David Fumanelli	2	0	0	0	1	18th	5th

== Timeline ==
Former series
Formula Junior	1998–1999
Italian Formula Renault Championship	2000–2008
Italian Formula 3	2003, 2005, 2008–2011
Eurocup Formula Renault 2.0	2005–2007
Euroformula Open	2008–2019
Auto GP Series	2010
World Series Formula V8 3.5	2016–2017
Indy Pro 2000 Championship	2018–2019, 2021
Italian F4 Championship	2019–2021
Formula Regional European Championship	2019–2021
