= Konstantin Tereshchenko =

Russian racing driver (born 1994)

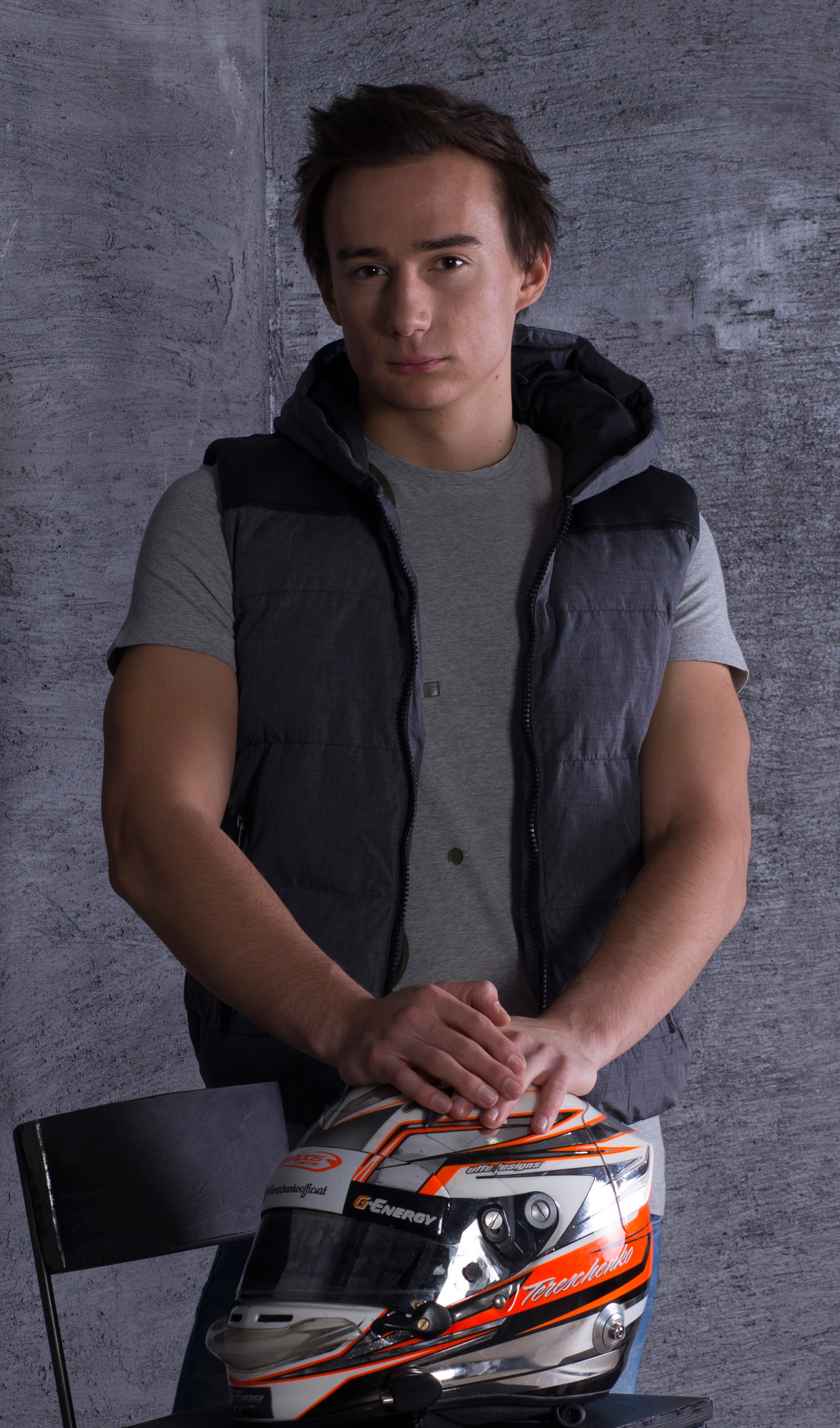
- A portrait of Tereshchenko
- Nationality: Russian
- Born: Konstantin Alekseyevich Tereshchenko; 17 June 1994 (age 32) Moscow, Russia

Euroformula Open career
- Debut season: 2014
- Current team: Campos Racing
- Categorisation: FIA Silver
- Car number: 6
- Starts: 32
- Wins: 6
- Poles: 8
- Fastest laps: 6
- Best finish: 2nd in 2015

Previous series
- 2014-15 2012–13 2012–13 2012–13: GP3 Series; Formula Renault 2.0 Alps; Eurocup Formula Renault 2.0; Formula Russia

Championship titles
- 2015 2012: Spanish Formula Three; Formula Russia

Konstantin Alekseyevich Tereshchenko (Russian: Константи́н Алексе́евич Тере́щенко, IPA: [kənstɐnʲˈtʲin ɐlʲɪkˈsʲe(j)ɪvʲɪtɕ tʲɪˈrʲeɕːɪnkə]; born 17 June 1994), sometimes transliterated as Tereschenko, is a Russian former professional racing driver.

== Career ==
=== Karting ===
Born in Moscow, Tereshchenko began karting in 2009 in the Junior class of the German karting championship. For the next two years, he competed in the KF2 category, racing in various European karting championships.

=== Formula Renault ===
In 2012, Tereshchenko moved into open-wheel racing, competing in Formula Renault 2.0 Alps with the Interwetten.com Racing Team. He ended the season 32nd, without scoring a point. He also had a part-time campaign in Eurocup Formula Renault 2.0.

Tereshchenko stayed with the team for the 2013 Formula Renault 2.0 Alps season. He improved to fifteenth position in the final series standings with four point-scoring positions. He also competed in three rounds of the Eurocup Formula Renault 2.0.

=== Euroformula Open ===
Tereshchenko stepped up to the Euroformula Open Championship, with Campos Racing, in 2014. He would remain with Campos Racing for a second season in 2015.

=== GP3 Series ===
In 2014, Tereshchenko was to have made his debut in the GP3 Series with Trident. He suffered a spectacular rollover in his first free practice session at Spa and was unable to partake in either of the weekends' two races. He returned to the championship late in the 2015 season with Campos Racing, and remained with the Spanish outfit for 2016. He only scored points in his final GP3 outings in Abu Dhabi in 2016 and was dropped for 2017.

=== World Series Formula V8 3.5 ===
Tereshchenko contested the World Series Formula V8 3.5 in 2017, initially competing with Teo Martín Motorsport before switching to SMP Racing for the last round in Bahrain. He finished eighth in the championship with a sole podium finish being his best result.

== Racing record ==
=== Career summary ===
Season	Series	Team	Races	Wins	Poles	F/Laps	Podiums	Points	Position
2012	Formula Russia	Team Moscow	7	5	2	4	5	155	**1st**
2012	Formula Renault 2.0 Alps	Interwetten.com Racing Team	14	0	0	0	0	0	32nd
2012	Eurocup Formula Renault 2.0	Interwetten.com Racing Team	6	0	0	0	0	0	44th
2013	Formula Renault 2.0 Alps	Interwetten.com Racing Team	14	0	0	0	0	25	15th
2013	Eurocup Formula Renault 2.0	Interwetten.com Racing Team	6	0	0	0	0	0	33rd
2013	Formula Russia	Team Moscow	4	3	3	4	4	73.5	4th
2014	Euroformula Open Championship	Campos Racing	16	0	0	0	1	75	6th
2014	Spanish Formula 3 Championship	Campos Racing	6	0	0	0	0	27	7th
2014	German Formula 3 Championship	ADM Motorsport	3	0	0	0	0	0	NC†
2014	GP3 Series	Trident	0	0	0	0	0	0	NC
2015	Euroformula Open Championship	Campos Racing	16	6	8	6	12	286	**2nd**
2015	Spanish Formula 3 Championship	Campos Racing	6	4	5	3	5	134	**1st**
2015	GP3 Series	Campos Racing	6	0	0	0	0	0	29th
2016	GP3 Series	Campos Racing	18	0	0	0	0	8	19th
2017	World Series Formula V8 3.5	Teo Martín Motorsport	16	0	0	0	1	94	8th
2017	World Series Formula V8 3.5	SMP Racing with AVF	2	0	0	0	0	94	8th
2018	European Le Mans Series - LMP2	AVF by Adrián Vallés	6	0	0	0	0	6	23rd
2019	European Le Mans Series - LMP2	Panis Barthez Competition	6	0	0	0	0	20	17th
2019	24 Hours of Le Mans - LMP2	ARC Bratislava	1	0	0	0	0	N/A	DNF
2020	European Le Mans Series - LMP2	Duqueine Engineering	5	0	0	0	1	38	7th
2021	GT World Challenge Europe Sprint Cup	AKKA ASP Team	10	0	0	0	0	23	12th
2021	GT World Challenge Europe Sprint Cup - Silver Cup	AKKA ASP Team	10	3	1	2	5	82.5	**3rd**
2021	GT World Challenge Europe Endurance Cup	AKKA ASP Team	5	0	0	0	0	1	32nd
2021	GT World Challenge Europe Endurance Cup - Silver Cup	AKKA ASP Team	5	2	0	0	2	74	**2nd**
2022	GT World Challenge Europe Endurance Cup	AKKodis ASP Team	1	0	0	0	0	0	NC

=== Complete Eurocup Formula Renault 2.0 results ===
(key) (Races in bold indicate pole position; races in italics indicate fastest lap)

Year	Entrant	1	2	3	4	5	6	7	8	9	10	11	12	13	14	DC	Points
2012	Interwetten.com Racing Team	ALC; 1	ALC; 2	SPA; 1	SPA; 2	NÜR; 1	NÜR; 2	MSC; 1; 29	MSC; 2; 22	HUN; 1; 28	HUN; 2; 29	LEC; 1	LEC; 2	CAT; 1; 21	CAT; 2; 21	44th	0
2013	Interwetten.com Racing Team	ALC; 1; 27	ALC; 2; 21	SPA; 1; 32	SPA; 2; 19	MSC; 1; 27	MSC; 2; 22	RBR; 1	RBR; 2	HUN; 1	HUN; 2	LEC; 1	LEC; 2	CAT; 1	CAT; 2	33rd	0

=== Complete Formula Renault 2.0 Alps Series results ===
(key) (Races in bold indicate pole position; races in italics indicate fastest lap)

Year	Team	1	2	3	4	5	6	7	8	9	10	11	12	13	14	Pos	Points
2012	Interwetten.com Racing Team	MNZ; 1; 22	MNZ; 2; 21	PAU; 1 Ret	PAU; 2; 16	IMO; 1; 17	IMO; 2; 18	SPA; 1; 16	SPA; 2; 14	RBR; 1 Ret	RBR; 2; 18	MUG; 1 Ret	MUG; 2; 19	CAT; 1; 16	CAT; 2 DNS	32nd	0
2013	Interwetten.com Racing Team	VLL; 1; 17	VLL; 2; 23	IMO1; 1; 32	IMO1; 2; 16	SPA; 1; 5	SPA; 2; 10	MNZ; 1 Ret	MNZ; 2; 19	MIS; 1; 5	MIS; 2; 20	MUG; 1; 19	MUG; 2; 12	IMO2; 1; 15	IMO2; 2; 8	15th	25

=== Complete GP3 Series results ===
(key) (Races in bold indicate pole position) (Races in italics indicate fastest lap)

Year	Entrant	1	2	3	4	5	6	7	8	9	10	11	12	13	14	15	16	17	18	Pos	Points
2014	Trident	CAT; FEA	CAT; SPR	RBR; FEA	RBR; SPR	SIL; FEA	SIL; SPR	HOC; FEA	HOC; SPR	HUN; FEA	HUN; SPR	SPA; FEA; DNS	SPA; SPR; DNS	MNZ; FEA	MNZ; SPR	SOC; FEA	SOC; SPR	YMC; FEA	YMC; SPR	NC	0
2015	Campos Racing	CAT; FEA	CAT; SPR	RBR; FEA	RBR; SPR	SIL; FEA	SIL; SPR	HUN; FEA	HUN; SPR	SPA; FEA	SPA; SPR	MNZ; FEA	MNZ; SPR	SOC; FEA; 17	SOC; SPR; 16	BHR; FEA; 18	BHR; SPR; 17	YMC; FEA; Ret	YMC; SPR; 20	29th	0
2016	Campos Racing	CAT; FEA; 17	CAT; SPR; 21	RBR; FEA; 18	RBR; SPR; Ret	SIL; FEA; 20	SIL; SPR; 13	HUN; FEA; 16	HUN; SPR; 17	HOC; FEA; Ret	HOC; SPR; 15	SPA; FEA; 17	SPA; SPR; Ret	MNZ; FEA; 17	SEP; FEA; 14	MNZ; FEA; 17	MNZ; SPR; 17	YMC; FEA; 8	YMC; SPR; 6	19th	8

=== Complete World Series Formula V8 3.5 results ===
(key) (Races in bold indicate pole position; races in italics indicate fastest lap)

Year	Team	1	2	3	4	5	6	7	8	9	10	11	12	13	14	15	16	17	18	Pos	Points
2017	Teo Martín Motorsport	SIL; 1; 8	SIL; 2; 5	SPA; 1; 10	SPA; 2; 11	MNZ; 1; 8	MNZ; 2; 7	JER; 1; 8	JER; 2; 7	ALC; 1; 6	ALC; 2 Ret	NÜR; 1; 9	NÜR; 2; 4	MEX; 1; 4	MEX; 2; 3	COA; 1 Ret	COA; 2; 8			8th	94
2017	SMP Racing with AVF																	BHR; 1; 7	BHR; 2 Ret	8th	94

=== Complete European Le Mans Series results ===
Year	Entrant	Class	Chassis	Engine	1	2	3	4	5	6	Rank	Points
2018	AVF by Adrián Vallés	LMP2	Dallara P217	Gibson GK428 4.2 L V8	LEC; 11	MNZ; Ret	RBR; 14	SIL; 8	SPA; 9‡	ALG; Ret	23rd	6
2019	Panis Barthez Competition	LMP2	Ligier JS P217	Gibson GK428 4.2 L V8	LEC; Ret	MNZ; 7	CAT; Ret	SIL; 5	SPA; Ret	ALG; 8	17th	20
2020	Duqueine Engineering	LMP2	Oreca 07	Gibson GK428 4.2 L V8	LEC; Ret	SPA; 4	LEC; 9	MNZ; 7	ALG; 2		7th	38

^{‡} Half points awarded as less than 75% of race distance was completed.

=== 24 Hours of Le Mans results ===
Year	Team	Co-Drivers	Car	Class	Laps	Pos.	Class Pos.
2019	(Slovakia) ARC Bratislava	(Sweden) Henning Enqvist (Slovakia) Miro Konôpka	Ligier JS P217-Gibson	LMP2	160	DNF	DNF
2020	(France) Duqueine Team	(France) Tristan Gommendy (Switzerland) Jonathan Hirschi	Oreca 07-Gibson	LMP2	100	DNF	DNF

=== Complete GT World Challenge Europe results ===
==== GT World Challenge Europe Sprint Cup ====
(key) (Races in bold indicate pole position) (Races in italics indicate fastest lap)

Year	Team	Car	Class	1	2	3	4	5	6	7	8	9	10	Pos.	Points
2021	AKKA ASP Team	Mercedes-AMG GT3 Evo	Silver	MAG; 1; 17	MAG; 2; 5	ZAN; 1; 6	ZAN; 2; 19	MIS; 1; 6	MIS; 2 Ret	BRH; 1; 11	BRH; 2; 7	VAL; 1; 10	**VAL**; **2**; 6	3rd	82.5

==== GT World Challenge Europe Endurance Cup ====
Year	Team	Car	Class	1	2	3	4	5	6	7	Pos.	Points
2021	AKKA ASP Team	Mercedes-AMG GT3 Evo	Silver	MON; 11	LEC; 11	SPA; 6H; 40	SPA; 12H; 34	SPA; 24H; 23	NÜR; Ret	CAT; 11	2nd	74
2022	AKKodis ASP Team	Mercedes-AMG GT3 Evo	Silver	IMO; Ret	LEC	SPA; 6H	SPA; 12H	SPA; 24H	HOC	CAT	NC	0

Sporting positions
Preceded by Inaugural	Formula Russia; Champion; 2012	Succeeded by Stanislav Burmistrov
Preceded by Sandy Stuvik	Spanish Formula 3 Championship; Champion; 2015	Succeeded by Leonardo Pulcini
