= List of Brazilian racing drivers =

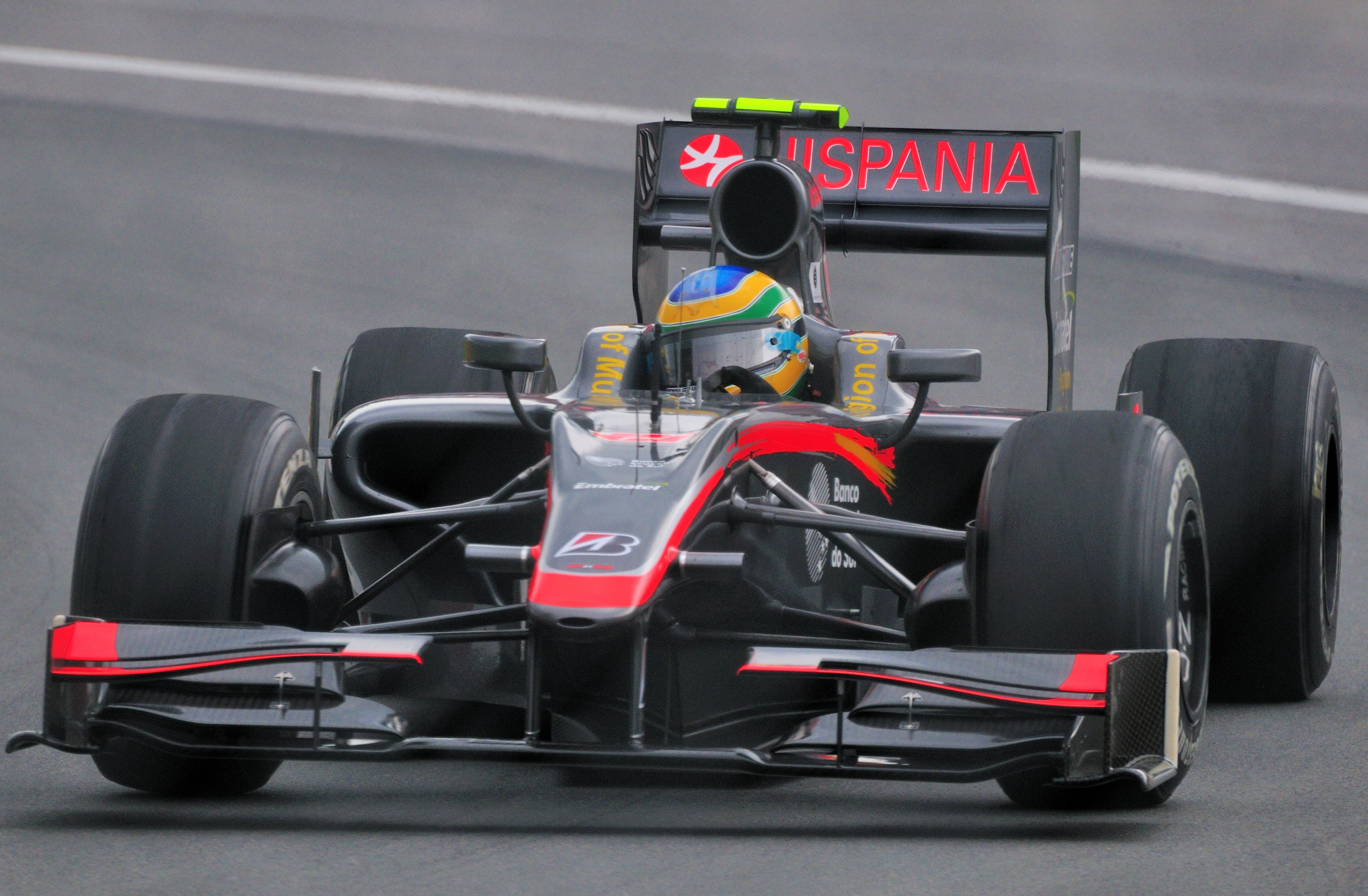
Bruno Senna at the Senna corner at Circuit Gilles Villeneuve

This is a list of racing drivers from Brazil – Brazilians who raced in events such as Formula One and the IndyCar Series, etc.

== List ==
- Abilio Diniz – Brazilian businessman (1936–2024)
- Adriano Buzaid – Brazilian racing driver
- Affonso Giaffone – Brazilian racing driver
- Airton Daré – Brazilian racing driver
- Alberto Valerio – Brazilian racing driver (born 1985)
- Alceu Feldmann – Brazilian racing driver
- Alex Ribeiro – Brazilian racing driver (born 1948)
- Alex Sperafico – Brazilian racing driver
- Alexandre Sarnes Negrão – Brazilian racing driver (born 1985)
- Allam Khodair – Brazilian racing driver (born 1981)
- Aluizio Coelho – Brazilian racing driver
- Ana Beatriz – Brazilian racing driver (born 1985)
- André Negrão – Brazilian racing driver
- André Ribeiro (racing driver) – Brazilian racing driver (1966–2021)
- Andreas Mattheis – Brazilian retired automobile racing driver
- Antônio Pizzonia – Brazilian racing driver (born 1980)
- Átila Abreu – Brazilian racing driver
- Augusto Farfus – Brazilian racing driver (born 1983)
- Ayrton Senna – Brazilian racing driver (1960–1994)
- Beto Monteiro – Brazilian racing driver (born 1975)
- Bruna Tomaselli – Brazilian racing driver
- Bruno Andrade (racing driver) – Brazilian racing driver (born 1991)
- Bruno Bonifacio – Brazilian racing driver
- Bruno Junqueira – Brazilian racing driver
- Bruno Senna – Brazilian racing driver (born 1983)
- Cacá Bueno – Brazilian racing driver
- Caio Collet – Brazilian racing driver (born 2002)
- Carlos Cunha – Brazilian racing driver
- Carlos Iaconelli – Brazilian racing driver (born 1987)
- Carlos Pace – Brazilian racing driver (1944–1977)
- César Ramos (racing driver) – Brazilian racing driver
- Chico Landi – Brazilian racing driver (1907{{ndash
- Chico Serra – Brazilian racing driver (born 1957)
- Christian Fittipaldi – Brazilian racing driver (born 1971)
- Christian Heins – Brazilian racing driver
- Claudio Cantelli – Brazilian racing driver
- Cláudio Ricci – Brazilian racing driver (born 1971)
- Clemente de Faria Jr. – Brazilian racing driver
- Cristiano da Matta – Brazilian racing driver (born 1973)
- Daniel Serra – Brazilian auto racing driver (born 1984)
- Danilo Dirani – Brazilian racing driver
- David Muffato – Brazilian racing driver (born 1971)
- Débora Rodrigues
- Denis Navarro – Brazilian auto racing driver (born 1987)
- Diego Nunes (racing driver) – Brazilian racing driver (born 1986)
- Duda Pamplona – Brazilian auto racing driver (born 1978)
- Eduardo Azevedo – Brazilian racing driver
- Emerson Fittipaldi – Brazilian racing driver (born 1946)
- Emerson Fittipaldi Jr. – Brazilian racing driver (born 2007)
- Enrique Bernoldi – Brazilian racing driver (born 1978)
- Enzo Fittipaldi – Brazilian racing driver (born 2001)
- Fabiano Machado – Brazilian professional racing driver (born 1986)
- Fábio Beretta – Brazilian racing driver
- Fábio Carbone – Brazilian race car driver
- Fábio Gamberini – Brazilian racing driver (born 1992)
- Felipe Drugovich – Brazilian racing driver (born 2000)
- Felipe Fraga – Brazilian racing driver
- Felipe Giaffone – Brazilian racing driver (born 1975)
- Felipe Guimarães – Brazilian racing driver
- Felipe Maluhy – Brazilian racing driver (born 1977)
- Felipe Massa – Brazilian racing driver (born 1981)
- Felipe Nasr – Brazilian racing driver (born 1992)
- Fernando Barrichello – Brazilian racing driver (born 2005)
- Fernando Rees – Brazilian racing driver
- Fritz d'Orey – Brazilian racing driver (1938–2020)
- Gabriel Bortoleto – Brazilian racing driver (born 2004)
- Gabriel Dias (racing driver) – Brazilian racing driver
- Galid Osman – Brazilian auto racing driver (born 1986)
- Giancarlo Vilarinho – Brazilian racecar driver from São Paulo (born 1992)
- Gil de Ferran – Brazilian racecar driver and team owner (1967–2023)
- Gino Bianco – Brazilian racing driver (1916–1984)
- Giuliano Losacco – Brazilian racing driver (born 1977)
- Giupponi Franca – Brazilian race car driver
- Gualter Salles
- Guilherme Samaia – Brazilian racing driver
- Gustavo Sondermann – Brazilian racing driver (1982–2011)
- Hélio Castroneves – Brazilian racing driver (born 1975)
- Hermano da Silva Ramos – French-Brazilian racing driver (born 1925)
- Hoover Orsi – Brazilian racing driver
- Igor Fraga – Brazilian-Japanese racing driver
- Ingo Hoffmann – Brazilian racing driver (born 1953)
- Jaime Camara – Brazilian race car driver (born 1980)
- Jaime Melo – Brazilian professional racing driver
- João Barion – Brazilian racing driver
- João Paulo de Oliveira – Brazilian professional racing driver (born 1981)
- João Victor Horto – Brazilian racing driver
- Juliano Moro – Brazilian racing driver (born 1977)
- Júlio Campos
- Leonardo Cordeiro
- Leonardo de Souza – Brazilian racing driver (born 1986)
- Leonardo Maia – Brazilian racing driver
- Lico Kaesemodel – Brazilian racing driver
- Lucas di Grassi – Brazilian racing driver (born 1984)
- Lucas Foresti – Brazilian racing driver (born 1992)
- Lucas Kohl – Brazilian racing driver
- Lucas Molo – Brazilian racing driver (born 1983)
- Luciano Burti – Brazilian racing driver (born 1975)
- Luiz Bueno – Brazilian racing driver (1937-2011)
- Luiz Fernando Uva
- Luiz Garcia Jr. – Brazilian race car driver (born 1971)
- Luiz Razia – Brazilian racing driver (born 1989)
- Marcelo Battistuzzi – Brazilian racing driver
- Marco Campos – Brazilian racing driver (1976–1995)
- Marco Greco – Brazilian former racing driver
- Marcos Gomes – Brazilian racing driver
- Marcos Gueiros – Brazilian racing driver (born 1970)
- Mário Haberfeld – Brazilian racing driver
- Mario Moraes – Brazilian racing driver
- Mario Romancini – Brazilian racing driver
- Matheus Leist – Brazilian racing driver (born 1998)
- Maurício Gugelmin – Brazilian racing driver (born 1963)
- Maurizio Sandro Sala – Brazilian former racing driver (born 1958)
- Max Wilson (racing driver) – Brazilian racing driver (born 1972)
- Miguel Paludo – Brazilian racing driver (born 1983)
- Nelson Merlo – Brazilian racing driver (born 1983)
- Nelson Piquet – Brazilian racing driver (born 1952)
- Nelson Piquet Jr. – Brazilian racing driver (born 1985)
- Niko Palhares – Brazilian former racing driver (born 1966)
- Nilton Rossoni – Brazilian racing driver
- Nonô Figueiredo – Brazilian racing driver (born 1971)
- Norio Matsubara
- Oswaldo Negri Jr. – Brazilian racing driver from São Paulo (born 1964)
- Paulo Carcasci – Brazilian racing driver
- Paulo Gomes (racing driver) – Brazilian racing driver
- Paulo Kunze
- Pedro Clerot – Brazilian racing driver (born 2007)
- Pedro Diniz – Brazilian racing driver (born 1970)
- Pedro Nunes (racing driver) – Brazilian racing driver
- Pedro Piquet – Brazilian racing driver
- Pietro Fantin – Brazilian racing driver (born 1991)
- Pietro Fittipaldi – Brazilian and American racing driver (born 1996)
- Pipo Derani – Brazilian racing driver (born 1993)
- Rafael Câmara – Brazilian racing driver (born 2005)
- Rafael Daniel – Brazilian racing driver
- Rafael Sperafico – Brazilian racing driver (1981–2007)
- Rafael Suzuki – Brazilian-Japanese racing driver (born 1987)
- Raphael Matos – Brazilian open-wheel racing driver
- Raul Boesel – Brazilian racing driver (born 1957)
- Ricardo Maurício – Brazilian racing driver (born 1979)
- Ricardo Rosset – Brazilian racing driver (born 1968)
- Ricardo Sperafico – Brazilian professional racing driver
- Ricardo Zonta – Brazilian racing driver (born 1976)
- Roberto Moreno – Brazilian racing driver (born 1959)
- Roberto Streit – Brazilian racing driver (born 1983)
- Rodrigo Barbosa – Brazilian racing driver from São Paulo
- Rodrigo Ribeiro (racing driver) – Brazilian racing driver (born 1979)
- Rodrigo Sperafico – Brazilian professional racing driver (born 1979)
- Ruben Carrapatoso – Brazilian race driver
- Rubens Barrichello – Brazilian racing driver (born 1972)
- Sérgio Jimenez – Brazilian racecar driver (born 1984)
- Sérgio Paese – Brazilian racing driver
- Sérgio Sette Câmara – Brazilian racing driver (born 1998)
- Tarso Marques – Brazilian racing driver (born 1976)
- Thiago Camilo – Brazilian racing driver
- Thiago Medeiros – Brazilian racing driver (born 1982)
- Thiago Moyses
- Thomas Erdos – Brazilian racing driver (born 1963)
- Tony Kanaan – Brazilian racing driver (born 1974)
- Tuka Rocha – Brazilian racing driver (1982–2019)
- Valdeno Brito – Brazilian racing driver
- Victor Carbone – Brazilian racing driver (born 1992)
- Victor Corrêa – Brazilian racing driver
- Victor Guerin (racing driver) – Brazilian racing driver
- Vitor Baptista (racing driver) – Brazilian racing driver
- Vítor Meira – Brazilian racing driver (born 1977)
- Walter Salles – Brazilian filmmaker (born 1956)
- Wilson Fittipaldi Júnior – Brazilian racing driver (1943–2024)
- Yann Cunha – Brazilian racing driver
- Zak Morioka – Brazilian racing driver
