= 2010 Formula 3 Brazil Open =

Seasons
- ← none 2011 →

Autódromo José Carlos Pace

The 2010 Formula 3 Brazil Open was the inaugural Formula 3 Brazil Open race held at Autódromo José Carlos Pace from January 21–24, 2010. There were private pre-event test sessions at Autódromo Internacional Nelson Piquet and Autódromo Internacional Ayrton Senna.

After a weekend of competition, British driver William Buller of the Hitech Racing Brazil outfit was crowned as the race champion, beating a host of Formula Three Sudamericana drivers, as well as André Negrão competing for the Cesario Fórmula team, who would drive in the Eurocup Formula Renault 2.0 championship later in the 2010 season. After Buller qualified on pole position for the first race, he and Negrão took a victory apiece with Yann Cunha finishing third in both races. Negrão won the third race, the pre-final, before Buller claimed the main event by nearly nine seconds from Negrão. Cunha finished third ahead of Razia Sports' Bruno Andrade, and Negrão's team-mate Vittorio Ghirelli completed the top five placings. In Class B the Brazilian of the RC3 Bassani was the winner.

== Drivers and teams ==
- All cars are powered by Berta engines, and will run on Pirelli tyres. All teams were Brazilian-registered.

2010 Entry List
| Team | No | Driver | Class | Chassis |
|---|---|---|---|---|
| Cesário Fórmula | 1 | (Italy) Vittorio Ghirelli | A | Dallara F309 |
| Cesário Fórmula | 2 | (Brazil) André Negrão | A | Dallara F309 |
| Hitech Racing Brazil | 7 | (United Kingdom) William Buller | A | Dallara F309 |
| Bassan Motorsport | 15 | (Brazil) Yann Cunha | A | Dallara F309 |
| Kemba Racing/G-Force | 16 | (Brazil) Fernando Galera | A | Dallara F309 |
| Razia Sports | 17 | (Brazil) Bruno Andrade | A | Dallara F309 |
| Cesário Fórmula Jr. | 31 | (Brazil) Fernando Resende | B | Dallara F301 |
| RC3 Bassani | 43 | (Brazil) Leandro Florenzo | B | Dallara F301 |

| Icon | Class |
|---|---|
| A | Class A |
| B | Class B |

== Classification ==
=== Qualifying ===
| Pos | No | Driver | Class | Team | Time |
|---|---|---|---|---|---|
| 1 | 7 | (United Kingdom) William Buller | A | Hitech Racing Brazil | 1:31.170 |
| 2 | 2 | (Brazil) André Negrão | A | Cesário Fórmula | 1:31.394 |
| 3 | 15 | (Brazil) Yann Cunha | A | Bassan Motorsport | 1:31.580 |
| 4 | 17 | (Brazil) Bruno Andrade | A | Razia Sports | 1:32.003 |
| 5 | 1 | (Italy) Vittorio Ghirelli | A | Cesário Fórmula | 1:32.287 |
| 6 | 43 | (Brazil) Leandro Florenzo | B | RC3 Bassani | 1:32.852 |
| 7 | 31 | (Brazil) Fernando Resende | B | Cesário Fórmula Jr. | 1:34.398 |
| 8 | 16 | (Brazil) Fernando Galera | A | Kemba Racing/G-Force | 1:35.227 |

=== Race 1 ===
| Pos | No | Driver | Class | Team | Laps | Time/Retired | Grid |
|---|---|---|---|---|---|---|---|
| 1 | 7 | (United Kingdom) William Buller | A | Hitech Racing Brazil | 16 | 30:23.742 | 1 |
| 2 | 2 | (Brazil) André Negrão | A | Cesário Fórmula | 16 | +4.940 | 2 |
| 3 | 15 | (Brazil) Yann Cunha | A | Bassan Motorsport | 16 | +34.267 | 3 |
| 4 | 17 | (Brazil) Bruno Andrade | A | Razia Sports | 16 | +38.176 | 4 |
| 5 | 1 | (Italy) Vittorio Ghirelli | A | Cesário Fórmula | 16 | +43.983 | 5 |
| 6 | 31 | (Brazil) Fernando Resende | B | Cesário Fórmula Jr. | 15 | +1 lap | 7 |
| Ret | 43 | (Brazil) Leandro Florenzo | B | RC3 Bassani | 0 | Retired | 6 |
| Ret | 16 | (Brazil) Fernando Galera | A | Kemba Racing/G-Force | 0 | Retired | 8 |
Fastest lap: William Buller, 1:40.488, 154.371 km/h (95.922 mph) on lap 16

=== Race 2 ===
| Pos | No | Driver | Class | Team | Laps | Time/Retired | Grid |
|---|---|---|---|---|---|---|---|
| 1 | 2 | (Brazil) André Negrão | A | Cesário Fórmula | 20 | 31:05.309 | 2 |
| 2 | 15 | (Brazil) Yann Cunha | A | Bassan Motorsport | 20 | +6.309 | 3 |
| 3 | 7 | (United Kingdom) William Buller | A | Hitech Racing Brazil | 20 | +7.538 | 1 |
| 4 | 1 | (Italy) Vittorio Ghirelli | A | Cesário Fórmula | 20 | +20.343 | 5 |
| 5 | 17 | (Brazil) Bruno Andrade | A | Razia Sports | 20 | +23.724 | 4 |
| 6 | 43 | (Brazil) Leandro Florenzo | B | RC3 Bassani | 20 | +46.985 | 6 |
| 7 | 31 | (Brazil) Fernando Resende | B | Cesário Fórmula Jr. | 17 | +3 laps | 7 |
| DNS | 16 | (Brazil) Fernando Galera | A | Kemba Racing/G-Force | 0 | Did not start | 8 |
Fastest lap: André Negrão, 1:32.296, 168.072 km/h (104.435 mph) on lap 4

=== Pre-final Grid ===
| Pos | Driver | Team | Points |
|---|---|---|---|
| 1 | (Brazil) André Negrão | Cesário Fórmula | 1 |
| 2 | (United Kingdom) William Buller | Hitech Racing Brazil | 2 |
| 3 | (Brazil) Yann Cunha | Bassan Motorsport | 3 |
| 4 | (Italy) Vittorio Ghirelli | Cesário Fórmula | 7 |
| 5 | (Brazil) Bruno Andrade | Razia Sports | 7 |
| 6 | (Brazil) Leandro Florenzo | RC3 Bassani | 11 |
| 7 | (Brazil) Fernando Resende | Cesário Fórmula Jr. | 11 |
| 8 | (Brazil) Fernando Galera | Kemba Racing/G-Force | 14 |

=== Pre-final Race ===
| Pos | No | Driver | Class | Team | Laps | Time/Retired | Grid |
|---|---|---|---|---|---|---|---|
| 1 | 2 | (Brazil) André Negrão | A | Cesário Fórmula | 18 | 31:43.595 | 1 |
| 2 | 7 | (United Kingdom) William Buller | A | Hitech Racing Brazil | 18 | +0.628 | 2 |
| 3 | 15 | (Brazil) Yann Cunha | A | Bassan Motorsport | 18 | +41.074 | 3 |
| 4 | 1 | (Italy) Vittorio Ghirelli | A | Cesário Fórmula | 18 | +51.830 | 4 |
| 5 | 17 | (Brazil) Bruno Andrade | A | Razia Sports | 17 | +1 lap | 5 |
| 6 | 31 | (Brazil) Fernando Resende | B | Cesário Fórmula Jr. | 17 | +1 lap | 7 |
| Ret | 43 | (Brazil) Leandro Florenzo | B | RC3 Bassani | 11 | Retired | 6 |
| Ret | 16 | (Brazil) Fernando Galera | A | Kemba Racing/G-Force | 7 | Retired | 8 |
Fastest lap: André Negrão, 1:44.429, 148.545 km/h (92.302 mph) on lap 16

=== Final Race ===
| Pos | No | Driver | Class | Team | Laps | Time/Retired | Grid |
|---|---|---|---|---|---|---|---|
| 1 | 7 | (United Kingdom) William Buller | A | Hitech Racing Brazil | 20 | 30:59.806 | 2 |
| 2 | 2 | (Brazil) André Negrão | A | Cesário Fórmula | 20 | +8.848 | 1 |
| 3 | 15 | (Brazil) Yann Cunha | A | Bassan Motorsport | 20 | +13.638 | 3 |
| 4 | 17 | (Brazil) Bruno Andrade | A | Razia Sports | 20 | +14.771 | 5 |
| 5 | 1 | (Italy) Vittorio Ghirelli | A | Cesário Fórmula | 20 | +31.950 | 4 |
| 6 | 43 | (Brazil) Leandro Florenzo | B | RC3 Bassani | 20 | +54.877 | 7 |
| 7 | 31 | (Brazil) Fernando Resende | B | Cesário Fórmula Jr. | 19 | +1 lap | 6 |
| DNS | 16 | (Brazil) Fernando Galera | A | Kemba Racing/G-Force | 0 | Did not start | 8 |
Fastest lap: William Buller, 1:31.942, 168.719 km/h (104.837 mph) on lap 10

== See also ==
- Formula Three Sudamericana
- Formula Three
