= Gran Premio de Santa Fe =

Circuito Callejero de Santa Fe
- Second Street Circuit (2008–2018)

- Original Street Circuit (2006–2007)
- Location: Santa Fe, Santa Fe Province
- Coordinates: 31°38′56.1″S 60°42′16.8″W
- Opened: 5 May 2006; 19 years ago
- Closed: 2 September 2018; 7 years ago
- Major events: TC2000 Championship (2006–2018); Formula Renault Argentina (2006–2013); Formula 3 Sudamericana (2006, 2010)

Second Street Circuit (2008–2018)
- Length: 3.020 km (1.877 mi)
- Turns: 14
- Race lap record: 1:11.407 ( (Brazil) Luiz Boesel, Dallara F309, 2010, F3)

Original Street Circuit (2006–2007)
- Length: 3.142 km (1.952 mi)
- Turns: 21
- Race lap record: 1:16.847 ( (Brazil) Diego Nunes, Dallara F301, 2006, F3)

The Gran Premio de Santa Fe (Santa Fe Grand Prix) was a motorsports race located in the streets of Santa Fe, Santa Fe Province, Argentina. It had hosted events in the TC2000/Súper TC2000 championship. It was carried out with a double race format, including a night race. Since 2019, this race has not been held.

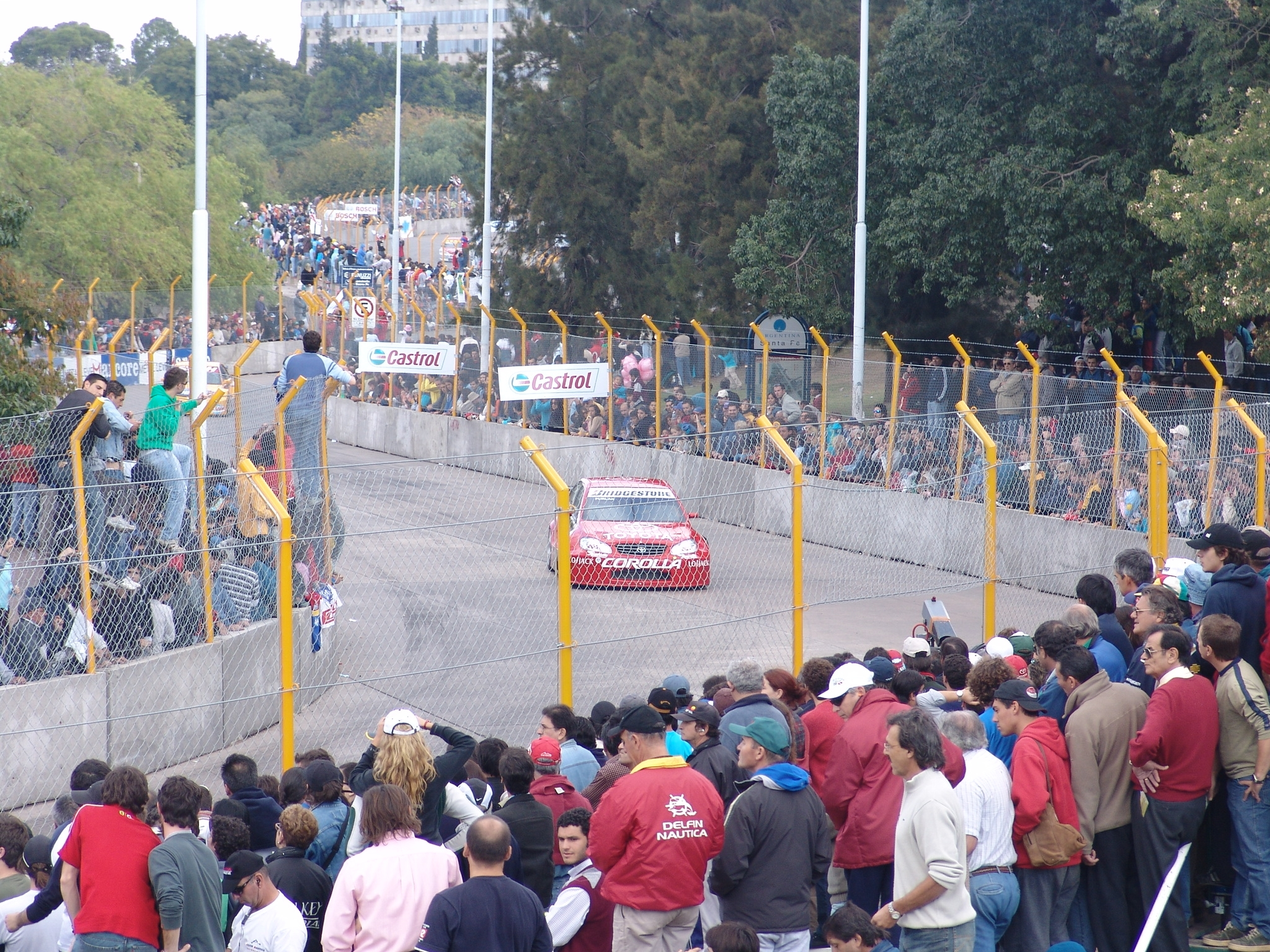
2006 race

Leonel Pernía and Agustín Canapino were the top winners, with four wins each.

== Layout history ==
The 2006–2007 version went around Lago Sur

In 2008, the route was moved north

== Lap records ==
As of September 2014, the fastest official race lap records at the Circuito Callejero de Santa Fe are listed as:

Category	Time	Driver	Vehicle	Event
Second Street Circuit (2008–2018): 3.020 km (1.877 mi)
Formula 3	1:11.407	Luiz Boesel	Dallara F309	2010 Santa Fe Resistencia F3 Sudamericana round
Formula Renault 2.0	1:18.252	Gianfranco Collino	Tito F4-A	2012 Santa Fe Formula Renault Argentina round
Súper TC2000	1:35.363	Néstor Girolami	Peugeot 408 I	2014 Santa Fe Súper TC2000 round
Original Street Circuit (2006–2007): 3.142 km (1.952 mi)
Formula 3	1:16.847	Diego Nunes	Dallara F301	2006 Santa Fe F3 Sudamericana round
TC2000	1:24.780	Christian Ledesma	Chevrolet Astra II	2007 Santa Fe TC2000 round
