= Bryan Herta Autosport =

Racing team

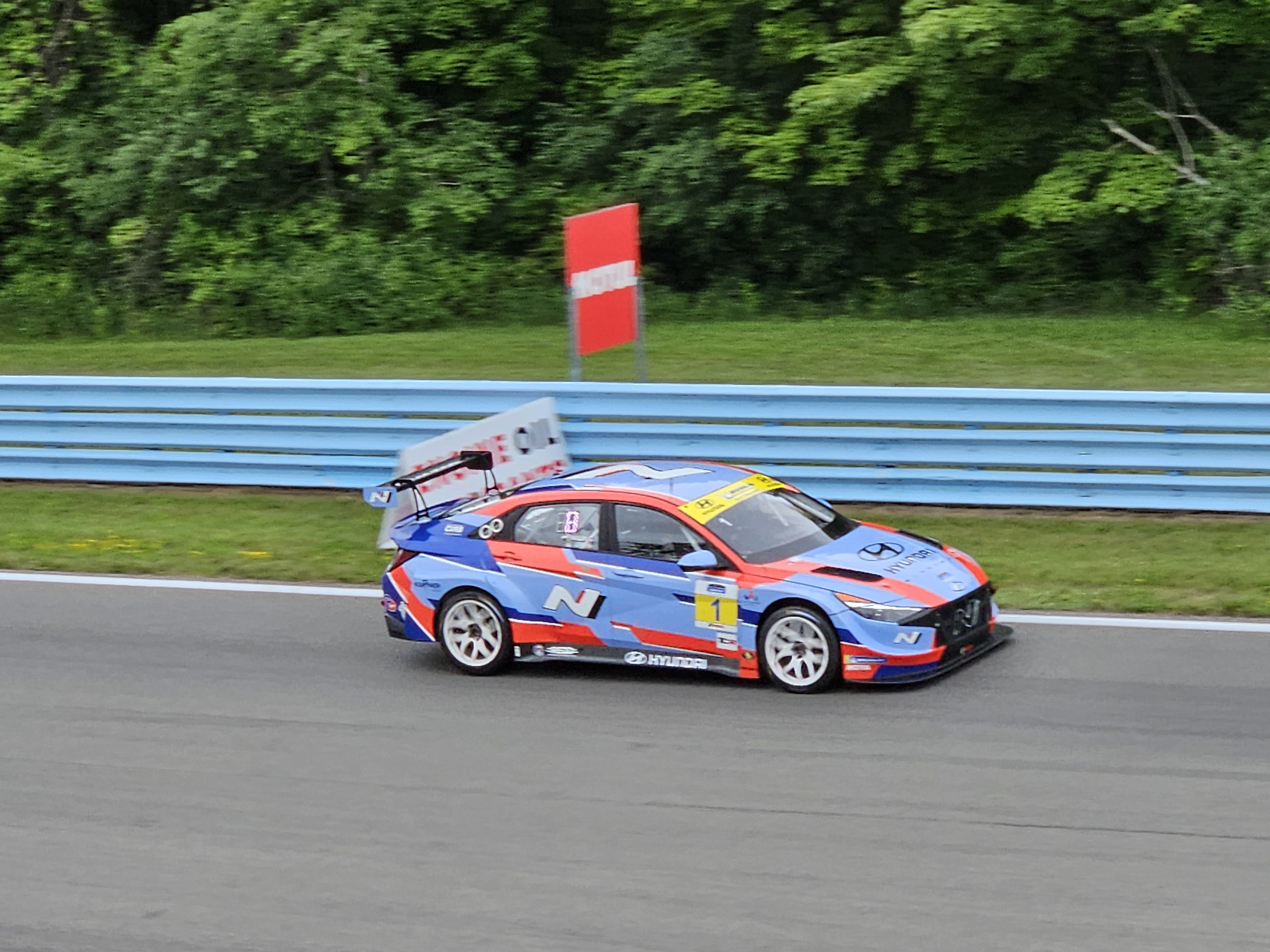
- Founded: 2009
- Folded: 2015 (merged into Andretti Autosport in 2016 onwards)
- Team principal(s): Bryan Herta
- Current series: IndyCar Series; Michelin Pilot Challenge; Sports Car Championship Canada
- Former series: Indy Lights; Global Rallycross Championship
- Current drivers: (Colombia) Gabby Chaves (United States) Mason Filippi (United States) Harry Gottsacker (United States) Michael Lewis (United States) Ryan Norman (Canada) Mark Wilkins
- Website: http://www.bryanhertaautosport.com/

Bryan Herta Autosport is an American auto racing team that competes in the IndyCar Series and the Michelin Pilot Challenge. It is owned by former IndyCar driver Bryan Herta. The team won the 2011 Indianapolis 500 with driver Dan Wheldon.

In 2016, Herta's entry was merged into the Andretti Autosport organization, with Alexander Rossi driving the team's No. 98 car for Andretti Herta Autosport with Curb-Agajanian. The team, collaborating with Andretti Autosport won the 2016 Indianapolis 500. In 2018, Rossi moved to the main Andretti Autosport team and Marco Andretti switched from the main Andretti team to the Herta-assisted entry. In 2019, Marco Andretti became a part-owner of this entry, forming Andretti Herta Autosport w/ Marco Andretti & Curb-Agajanian.

The team competed as Bryan Herta Rallysport in the Red Bull Global RallyCross Championship from 2015 until the series folded at the end of 2017. In 2019, the team, as Bryan Herta Autosport with Curb-Agajanian, joined the Michelin Pilot Challenge in the TCR class. The team ran the Hyundai Veloster N TCR in its inaugural season in the series and drivers Michael Lewis and Mark Wilkins won the TCR championship.

== IndyCar ==
=== Debut season ===
The team's first season of competition was in 2009 with North Carolina native Daniel Herrington, driving car #28. Through most of the season, 5th place at St. Petersburg was his best result, but Herrington changed that when he won his – and the team's – first Indy Lights race at Chicagoland. The team fielded a second car for A1GP Team Brazil's Felipe Guimarães in three mid-season road course events. Driving car number 29, Guimarães finished 3rd, 4th, and 2nd respectively at Watkins Glen, Mid-Ohio, and Sonoma. Herrington finished 7th in points after 12 Top 10s in the 15-race season, and Guimarães was 23rd overall despite competing only 3 times.

=== Two-car team ===
For 2010 they ran full-time Indy Lights programs for second-year drivers Sebastián Saavedra and Stefan Wilson. Despite ranking 5th in the championship, Saavedra quit the team after qualifying 12th for the Drive Smart Buckle Up 100 at Kentucky in September. He was replaced by BHA's 2009 driver Daniel Herrington for the race, in which he finished 12th. Saavedra had won at Iowa in June and posted 5 Top 5s and 7 Top 10s. The team's other driver, Stefan Wilson, scored 3 Top 5s and 8 Top 10s – including a season and career best of 3rd on the wet streets of St. Petersburg, Florida – but had to miss the road race at Infineon Raceway in favor of American Joel Miller while sponsorship issues were resolved. He also had to give way to 2008 Freedom 100 winner Dillon Battistini at Homestead. Each substitute driver finished 9th in his respective race. Saavedra and Wilson, each of whom missed two races, finished 8th and 11th in the championship respectively. In a season that had shorter fields than in recent years, BHA's late-season replacement drivers Herrington, Battistini, and Miller – with 2 starts each – ranked 21st, 22nd, and 23rd in that order.

=== Bump Day miracle ===
The team also qualified for the 2010 Indianapolis 500. Saavedra crashed in Turn 1 with just over an hour left on Bump Day in hopes of improving from the bubble position (33rd). At about 5:30 Saavedra was bumped by Tony Kanaan. Soon after, rookie Mario Romancini withdrew his time and improved – his Conquest Racing team were bumped in 2009 when the track became quicker – prompting Paul Tracy and rookie Jay Howard to follow suit. Conversely, Howard and Tracy failed to improve their efforts and their new speeds were slower than that of Saavedra, whose speed was never withdrawn, and was being checked for possible injury at nearby Methodist Hospital when he learned he had qualified. Born on June 2, 1990, Saavedra became the first IndyCar starter born in the 1990s. Team owner Herta jokingly referred to his low budget Indy 500 effort as "'Two Men in a Truck' Racing". His IndyCar debut ended 100 miles early in an accident in the South chute. Curt Cavin of The Indianapolis Star reported that several other IndyCar races were possible for the team in 2010, but nothing materialised.

=== 2011 ===
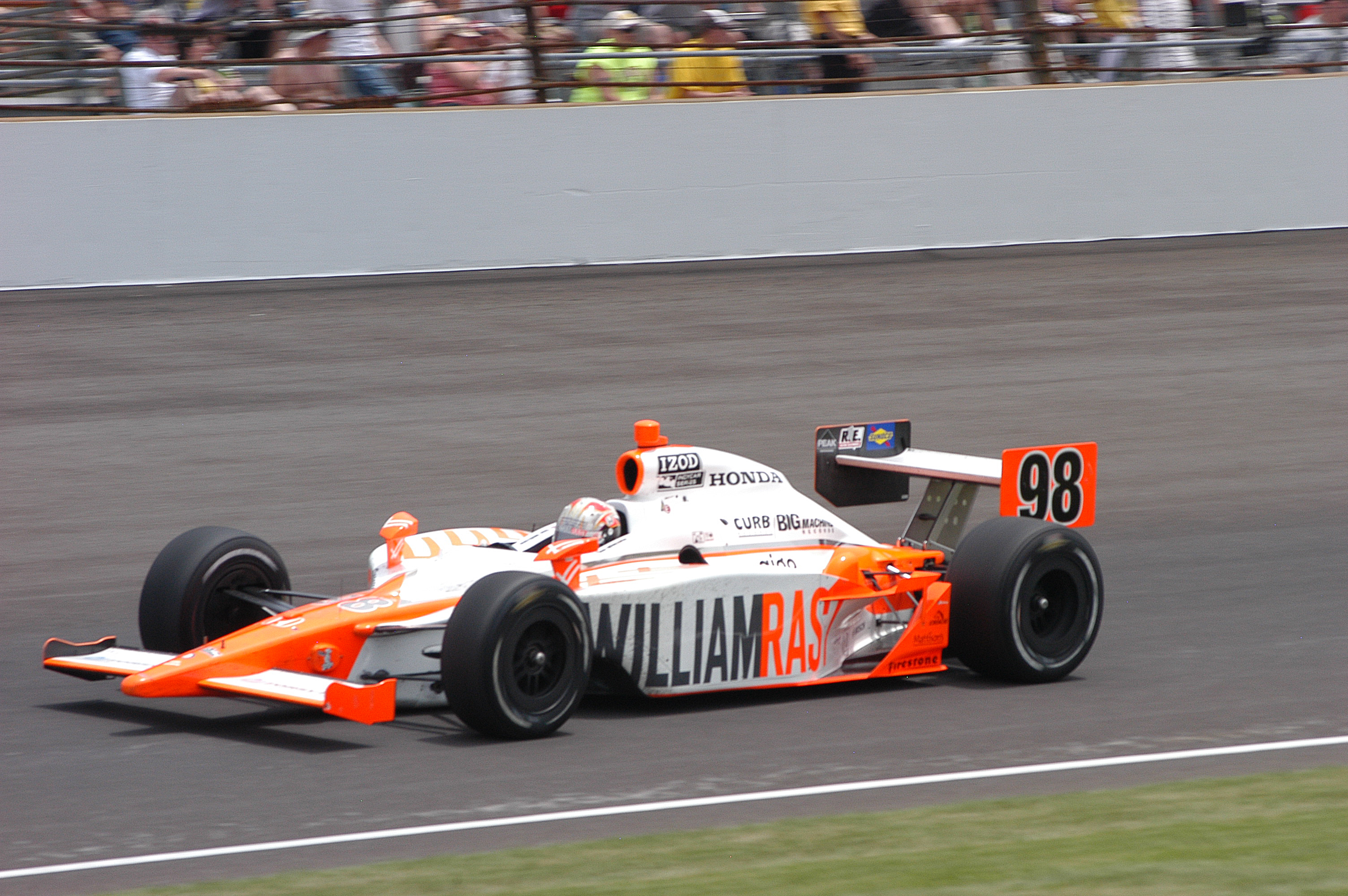
BHA's car that won the 2011 Indianapolis 500 with Wheldon

On March 21, BHA announced their signing of Angolan driver Duarte Ferreira, the first Angolan driver in Indy Lights history, to drive car number 28. The team announced their 2011 IndyCar Series season plans on March 25. 2005 Indianapolis 500 winner and season Champion Dan Wheldon, who was a teammate of Herta at Andretti-Green Racing from 2003 to 2005, won the 2011 Indianapolis 500 for the team. It was announced that the team may run additional IndyCar races in 2011. At the final race of the season at Las Vegas Motor Speedway, Wheldon was killed in an accident involving 15 drivers driving for Sam Schmidt Motorsports, which red flagged and ultimately canceled the race. BHA fielded regular Sam Schmidt Motorsports driver Alex Tagliani for the season finale in the No. 98 car who was not involved in the incident.

The car Wheldon drove in the Indianapolis 500 had been crashed at the Firestone Twin 275s Race 1 by Wade Cunningham, and was not used the rest of the season; that car was returned to the 2011 Indianapolis 500 winning livery and fully restored, with it taking a ceremonial lap at the 2012 Indianapolis 500 along with Wheldon's 2005 winning car, owned by Andretti Autosport.

Duarte Ferreira finished eighth in the final Indy Lights points with a best finish of third at the New Hampshire Motor Speedway. The team also fielded a second entry for Bruno Andrade in five road and street course races. Andrade had a best finish of fourth at Baltimore and finished 17th in points.

=== 2012–2013 ===
Alex Tagliani continued his association with the team, now sponsored by Barracuda Networks, with the team rebranded as Barracuda Racing. Due to a lack of pace from the Lotus engine, BHA cancelled its contract and switched to Honda, and the team chose to skip travelling to Brazil to prepare for the Indy 500. The engine switch improved the team's performance significantly: Tagliani qualified on the pole for the Firestone 550 at Texas Motor Speedway and advanced to the Firestone Fast Six – the final round of road course qualifying – in Belle Isle, Toronto, Edmonton and Mid-Ohio. Tagliani finished 17th in points with a best finish of fifth at the Edmonton Indy where he led the most laps.

BHA, then using the name Barracuda Racing, returned for the 2013 IndyCar Series season with Tagliani driving and Honda power. Tagliani was relieved of driving duties after thirteen races and replaced by Luca Filippi and J. R. Hildebrand, who had also been let go from Panther Racing earlier in the season. In 2013 the team also fielded an Indy Lights car for Chase Austin in the Freedom 100 and Axcil Jefferies at Mid-Ohio and Houston.

=== 2014 ===
In 2014, the team lost Barracuda Networks as a full season sponsor. Despite testing Filippi, the team chose 2012 Star Mazda champion Jack Hawksworth Hawksworth qualified second at the Grand Prix of Indianapolis, where he achieved his first top-ten finish in his IndyCar Series career, finishing seventh. He then went on to earn his first podium during the second race at the Grand Prix of Houston, finishing third. Hawksworth finished the 2014 season seventeenth in the championship points.

=== 2015 ===
In 2015, the team hired reigning Indy Lights champion Gabby Chaves and had full-season sponsorship from Bowers & Wilkins. Chaves had two top-ten finishes throughout the season and finished sixteenth in his first Indianapolis 500 race. Chaves was awarded the Indiana Dairy Farmers "Fastest Rookie" for having the quickest average qualifying speed for the Indianapolis 500. He was also awarded the Indy 500 Rookie of the Year honors, as well as the Sunoco Rookie of the Year for the IndyCar Series championship standings. Chaves also finished second in the TAG Heuer "Don't Crack Under Pressure" award, given to the driver who gained the most cumulative spots from qualifying to finish over the season; Chaves finished ahead of his qualifying position in every race but one, and took the checkered flag at every race except the ABC Supply 500 at Pocono Raceway, where he led 31 laps – the only laps he led in the 2015 season – but he was forced to retire 3 laps early with mechanical issues, while he was in the lead.

=== 2016 ===
Having fallen to insolvency, lack of adequate funding or a sufficiently well-heeled pay driver, Herta's entry was merged into the Andretti Autosport organization, with Alexander Rossi driving the team's No. 98 car.

== Global RallyCross Championship ==
On April 16, 2015, the team announced their intention to field a team in the Global RallyCross Championship (GRC) under the name Bryan Herta Rallysport. The following day, GRC veteran rally driver Patrik Sandell and former NASCAR K&N Pro Series West driver Austin Dyne were hired to race for the team, driving the No. 18 Kobalt Tools and No. 14 Castrol Magnatec GTX cars respectively. Collete Davis was also announced to drive a GRC Lites entry for River Racing, falling under the Bryan Herta Rallysport umbrella. In August 2015, CUTTWOOD Vaping Juice made its debut on Dyne's car as the new primary sponsor for the remainder of the 2015 season.

Sandell and Dyne scored five podium finishes between them during the 2015 season; Sandell took four podium finishes in five races, including a victory at Detroit, en route to eighth in the drivers' championship. Dyne took a second-place finish at Daytona, as he finished behind Sandell in the standings, in ninth place.

== Racing results ==
=== Complete IndyCar results ===
(key)

IndyCar Series results
Year	Chassis	Engine	Drivers	No.	1	2	3	4	5	6	7	8	9	10	11	12	13	14	15	16	17	18	19	Pos	Pos
Bryan Herta Autosport
2010					SAO	STP	ALA	LBH	KAN	INDY	TXS	IOW	WGL	TOR	EDM	MOH	SNM	CHI	KTY	MOT	HMS				
2010	Dallara IR-05	Honda HI7R V8	(Colombia) Sebastián Saavedra (R)	29						23														33rd	29
2011					STP	ALA	LBH	SAO	INDY	TXS		MIL	IOW	TOR	EDM	MOH	NHA	SNM	BAL	MOT	KTY	LSV^{1}			
2011	Dallara IR-05	Honda HI7R V8	(United Kingdom) Dan Wheldon	98					1															28th	75
2011	Dallara IR-05	Honda HI7R V8	(Canada) Alex Tagliani	98																		C^{2}		15th	296
Team Barracuda – BHA
2012					STP	ALA	LBH	SAO	INDY	DET	TXS	MIL	IOW	TOR	EDM	MOH	SNM	BAL	FON						
2012	Dallara DW12	Lotus DC00 V6t	(Canada) Alex Tagliani	98	15	26	21																	17th	272
2012	Dallara DW12	Honda HI12TT V6t	(Canada) Alex Tagliani	98					12	10	9	7	16	10	5	10	9	8	20					17th	272
Barracuda Racing
2013					STP	ALA	LBH	SAO	INDY	DET		TXS	MIL	IOW	POC	TOR		MOH	SNM	BAL	HOU		FON		
2013	Dallara DW12	Honda HI13TT V6t	(Canada) Alex Tagliani	98	10	11	19	12	24	23	21	22	23	24	17	17	10							24th	180
2013	Dallara DW12	Honda HI13TT V6t	(Italy) Luca Filippi (R)	98														16		22	10	19		30th	53
2013	Dallara DW12	Honda HI13TT V6t	(United States) J. R. Hildebrand	98															16				11	25th	112
Bryan Herta Autosport
2014					STP	LBH	ALA	IMS	INDY	DET		TXS	HOU		POC	IOW	TOR		MOH	MIL	SNM	FON			
2014	Dallara DW12	Honda HI14TT V6t	(United Kingdom) Jack Hawksworth (R)	98	21	15	12	7	20	19	14	16	6	3	DNS	15	13	6	16	10	15	15		17th	366
2015					STP	NOL	LBH	ALA	IMS	INDY	DET		TXS	TOR	FON	MIL	IOW	MOH	POC	SNM					
2015	Dallara DW12	Honda HI15TT V6t	(Colombia) Gabby Chaves (R)	98	17	15	16	16	15	16	18	9	10	15	20	11	16	12	11	14				15th	281
Andretti Herta Autosport with Curb Agajanian
2016^{2}					STP	PHX	LBH	ALA	IGP	INDY	DET		ROA	IOW	TOR	MOH	POC	TEX	WGL	SNM					
2016^{2}	Dallara DW12	Honda HI15TT V6t	(United States) Alexander Rossi (R)	98	12	14	20	15	10	1	10	12	15	6	16	14	20	11	8	5				11th	430
2017^{2}					STP	LBH	ALA	PHX	IMS	INDY	DET		TEX	ROA	IOW	TOR	MOH	POC	GAT	WGL	SNM				
2017^{2}	Dallara DW12	Honda HI15TT V6t	(United States) Alexander Rossi	98	11	19	5	15	8	7	5	7	22	13	11	2	6	3	6	1*	21			7th	494
2018^{2}					STP	PHX	LBH	ALA	IGP	INDY	DET		TEX	ROA	IOW	TOR	MOH	POC	GAT	POR	SNM				
2018^{2}	Dallara DW12	Honda HI15TT V6t	(United States) Marco Andretti	98	9	12	6	10	13	12	4	9	14	11	16	10	11	7	14	25	5			9th	392
Andretti Herta Autosport with Marco Andretti & Curb Agajanian
2019^{3}					STP	COA	ALA	LBH	IMS	INDY	DET	DET	TEX	ROA	TOR	IOW	MOH	POC	GAT	POR	LAG				
2019^{3}	Dallara DW12	Honda HI19TT V6t	(United States) Marco Andretti	98	13	6	14	13	13	26	16	6	10	23	10	21	15	15	10	13	14			16th	303
2020					TEX	IMS	ROA		IOW		INDY	GTW		MOH		IMS		STP							
2020	Dallara DW12	Honda HI20TT V6t	(United States) Marco Andretti	98	14	22	22	19	22	10	13	23	15	23	20	25	22	20						20th	176

1. The final race at Las Vegas was canceled due to Dan Wheldon's death.
2. In conjunction with Andretti Autosport.
3. In conjunction with Andretti Autosport and Marco Andretti.

=== Infiniti Pro Series/Indy Pro Series/Indy Lights ===
(key)

Indy Lights results
Year	Chassis	Engine	Drivers	No.	1	2	3	4	5	6	7	8	9	10	11	12	13	14	15	Points		Position	
2009					STP		LBH	KAN	INDY	MIL	IOW	WGL	TOR	EDM	KTY	MOH	SNM	CHI	HMS	D.C.	T.C.	D.C.	T.C.
2009	Dallara	Nissan VRH	(United States) Daniel Herrington (R)	28	7	5	10	6	7	14	9	6	9	9	6	6	11	1	12	383	—	7th	—
2009	Dallara	Nissan VRH	(Brazil) Felipe Guimarães (R)	29								3				4	2			107	—	23rd	—
2010					STP	ALA	LBH	INDY	IOW	WGL	TOR	EDM	MOH	SNM	CHI	KTY	HMS			D.C.	T.C.	D.C.	T.C.
2010	Dallara	Nissan VRH	(United Kingdom) Stefan Wilson (R)	28	3	6	17	7	7	12	5	7	4		6	14				278	—	11th	—
2010	Dallara	Nissan VRH	(United States) Joel Miller (R)	28										9						41	—	23rd	—
2010	Dallara	Nissan VRH	(Colombia) Sebastián Saavedra	29	12	3	4	9	1*	3	14	6	5	15	11					303	—	8th	—
2010	Dallara	Nissan VRH	(United States) Daniel Herrington	29												12				44	—	21st	—
2010	Dallara	Nissan VRH	(United Kingdom) Dillon Battistini	29													9			44	—	22nd	—
2011					STP	ALA	LBH	INDY	MIL	IOW	TOR	EDM		TRO	NHA	BAL	KTY	LSV		D.C.	T.C.	D.C.	T.C.
2011	Dallara	Nissan VRH	(Angola) Duarte Ferreira (R)	28	8	7	14	13	12	5	10	8	9	8	3	10	6	11		323	—	8th	—
2011	Dallara	Nissan VRH	(Brazil) Bruno Andrade (R)	29							11	6	15	12		4				112	—	17th	—
2012					STP	ALA	LBH	INDY	DET	MIL	IOW	TOR	EDM	TRO	BAL	FON				D.C.	T.C.	D.C.	T.C.
2012	Dallara	Nissan VRH	(United States) Troy Castaneda (R)	28	9	15														37	—	19th	—
2012	Dallara	Nissan VRH	(United States) Nick Andries (R)	28			13													17	—	26th	—
2012	Dallara	Nissan VRH	(Norway) Anders Krohn	28				19			9									34	—	20th	—
2013					STP	ALA	LBH	INDY	MIL	IOW	POC	TOR	MOH	BAL	HOU	FON				D.C.	T.C.	D.C.	T.C.
2013	Dallara	Nissan VRH	(United States) Chase Austin	28				8												24	—	17th	—
2013	Dallara	Nissan VRH	(Zimbabwe) Axcil Jefferies (R)	28									7		5					56	—	11th	—
2014					STP	LBH	ALA		IMS		INDY	POC	TOR	MOH		MIL	SNM			D.C.	T.C.	D.C.	T.C.
2014	Dallara	Nissan VRH	(United Kingdom) Lloyd Read (R)	28	11	11	11	9	10	9										101	56	11th	6th
2014	Dallara	Nissan VRH	(United States) Ryan Phinny (R)	28									11	12	7		10	6		91	56	12th	6th

=== Complete Global Rallycross Championship results ===
(key)

==== Supercar ====
Year	Entrant	Car	No.	Driver	1	2	3	4	5	6	7	8	9	10	11	12	GRC	Points
2015	Bryan Herta Rallysport	Ford Fiesta ST	14	(United States) Austin Dyne	FTA; 6	DAY1; 2	DAY2; 7	MCAS; 4	DET1; 6	DET2; 6	DC; 8	LA1; 15	LA2; 11	BAR1; 9	BAR2; 8	LV; 7	9th	277
2015	Bryan Herta Rallysport	Ford Fiesta ST	18	(Sweden) Patrik Sandell	FTA; 11	DAY1; 9	DAY2; 10	MCAS; 2	DET1; 9	DET2; 1	DC; 2	LA1; 3	LA2; 4	BAR1; DSQ	BAR2; 10	LV; 13	8th	328
2016	Bryan Herta Rallysport	Ford Fiesta ST	18	(Sweden) Patrik Sandell	PHO1; 2	PHO2; 4	DAL; 1	DAY1; 8	DAY2; 8	MCAS1; 4	MCAS2; C	DC; 2	AC; 2	SEA; 11	LA1; 5	LA2; 3	5th	436
2017	Bryan Herta Rallysport	Ford Fiesta ST	2	(United States) Cabot Bigham	MEM; 6	LOU; 7	THO1; 8	THO2; DNS	OTT1; 7	OTT2; 8	INDY; 9	AC1; 8	AC2; 6	SEA1	SEA2	LA; 4	10th	473
2017	Bryan Herta Rallysport	Ford Fiesta ST	19	(United States) Austin Cindric	MEM	LOU	THO1	THO2	OTT1	OTT2	INDY	AC1	AC2	SEA1; 8	SEA2; 4	LA	11th	102
