= 2011 Formula 3 Sudamericana season =

2011 Formula 3 Sudamericana

Seasons
- ← 2010 2012 →

The 2011 Formula 3 Sudamericana season was the 25th Formula 3 Sudamericana season. It began on 21 March 2011, in Velopark, and ended on 17 December at Autódromo Internacional Orlando Moura in Campo Grande.

In year most complicated of the category, Fabiano Machado dominated the Championship, winning 17 of the 25 races in a season where only he and one other driver, Ronaldo Freitas, competed in every race. Bruno Bonifacio dominated the Sudamericana Class B, winning 12 races.

== Drivers and teams ==
- All cars are powered by Berta engines, and will run on Pirelli tyres. All teams were Brazilian-registered.

Team	No.	Driver	Chassis	Rounds
Class A
Cesário Fórmula	1	(Brazil) Fabiano Machado	Dallara F309	All
Cesário Fórmula	2	(Brazil) Fernando Resende	Dallara F309	1
Cesário Fórmula	2	(Brazil) Denis Navarro	Dallara F309	2–3
Cesário Fórmula	2	(Brazil) Paulo Bonifacio	Dallara F309	3
Cesário Fórmula	2	(Brazil) Roberto Streit	Dallara F309	6
Cesário Fórmula	2	(Brazil) Felipe Guimarães	Dallara F309	8
Cesário Fórmula	2	(Brazil) Leandro Florenzo	Dallara F309	8
Cesário Fórmula	2	(Brazil) Victor Guerin	Dallara F309	9
Cesário Fórmula	3	(Brazil) Ronaldo Freitas	Dallara F309	All
Kemba Racing	7	(Brazil) Leonardo de Souza	Dallara F309	1–7
Kemba Racing	8	(Brazil) Dorivaldo Gondra, Jr.	Dallara F309	4
Kemba Racing	8	(Brazil) Jonathan Mello	Dallara F309	6
Kemba Racing	37	(Brazil) Daniel Politzer	Dallara F309	2
Kemba Racing	37	(Brazil) Dorivaldo Gondra, Jr.	Dallara F309	3
Kemba Racing	37	(Brazil) Carlos Teixeira	Dallara F309	4
Hitech Racing Brazil	8	(Brazil) Galid Osman	Dallara F309	3
Hitech Racing Brazil	14	(Brazil) Galid Osman	Dallara F309	2
Hitech Racing Brazil	9	(Brazil) Guilherme Silva	Dallara F309	1–3, 5–6
Hitech Racing Brazil	10	(Brazil) João Leme	Dallara F309	1–3, 5
Hitech Racing Brazil	18	(Brazil) Roberto Savério	Dallara F309	1
Hitech Racing Brazil	27	(Argentina) Jean Catalano	Dallara F309	7
Hitech Racing Brazil	28	(Brazil) Fernando Resende	Dallara F309	2–5, 8
Hitech Racing Brazil	28	(Brazil) Rafael Isenhard	Dallara F309	6
Hitech Racing Brazil	28	(Argentina) Agustín Canapino	Dallara F309	7
Cesário Fórmula Júnior	31	(Argentina) Buno Etman	Dallara F309	7
Cesário Fórmula Júnior	33	(Brazil) Higor Hofmann	Dallara F309	8–9
Cesário Fórmula Júnior	35	(Brazil) Felipe Polehtto	Dallara F309	3
Cesário Fórmula Júnior	35	(Brazil) Beto Monteiro	Dallara F309	4
Cesário Fórmula Júnior	35	(Brazil) Ricardo Landucci	Dallara F309	5–9
Cesário Fórmula Júnior	36	(Brazil) Luiz Boesel	Dallara F309	3
Cesário Fórmula Júnior	36	(Brazil) Suzane Carvalho	Dallara F309	3
Cesário Fórmula Júnior	36	(Brazil) Luir Miranda	Dallara F309	5
Cesário Fórmula Júnior	36	(Brazil) Fernando Junior	Dallara F309	6
Cesário Fórmula Júnior	36	(Brazil) Ricardo Landi	Dallara F309	8
Cesário Fórmula Júnior	36	(Brazil) Vinícius Alvarenga	Dallara F309	9
Class B
Kemba Racing	37	(Brazil) Jonathan Mello	Dallara F301	1
Cesário Fórmula Júnior	31	(Brazil) Bruno Bonifacio	Dallara F301	1–4, 6
Cesário Fórmula Júnior	32	(Brazil) Ricardo Landi	Dallara F301	1
Cesário Fórmula Júnior	33	(Brazil) Matheus Stumpf	Dallara F301	1
Cesário Fórmula Júnior	35	(Argentina) Augusto Scalbi	Dallara F301	2
Cesário Fórmula Júnior	36	(Argentina) Hernán Bueno	Dallara F301	2
Dragão Motorsport	42	(Brazil) Vinícius Alvarenga	Dallara F301	2
Dragão Motorsport	42	(United Kingdom) Stuart Turvey	Dallara F301	3, 9

Notes:

- Leandro Florenzo and Felipe Guimarães competed in partnership.
- Luiz Boesel and Suzane Carvalho also competed in partnership.
- Due to the short grid, some drivers of other categories were guest for Sunday race.

== Race calendar and results ==
Round	Location	Circuit	Date	Race 1 winner	Race 2 winner	Race 3 winner
1	Nova Santa Rita, Brazil	Velopark	March 26–27	(Brazil) Guilherme Silva	(Brazil) Guilherme Silva	(Brazil) Guilherme Silva
2	São Paulo, Brazil	Autódromo José Carlos Pace	July 15–16	(Brazil) Fabiano Machado	(Brazil) Fabiano Machado	(Brazil) Fabiano Machado
3	Rio de Janeiro, Brazil	Autódromo Internacional Nelson Piquet	July 30–31	(Brazil) Leonardo de Souza	(Brazil) Fabiano Machado	(Brazil) Fabiano Machado
4	Caruaru, Brazil	Autódromo Ayrton Senna	August 13–14	(Brazil) Fabiano Machado	(Brazil) Fernando Resende	(Brazil) Fabiano Machado
5	Campo Grande, Brazil	Autódromo Internacional Orlando Moura	August 27–28	(Brazil) Fabiano Machado	(Brazil) Fabiano Machado	(Brazil) Fabiano Machado
6	Santa Cruz do Sul, Brazil	Autódromo Internacional de Santa Cruz do Sul	September 10–11	(Brazil) Guilherme Silva	(Brazil) Guilherme Silva	(Brazil) Fabiano Machado
7	Entre Ríos, Argentina	Autódromo Ciudad de Paraná	September 24–25	(Brazil) Fabiano Machado	(Brazil) Fabiano Machado	—N/a
8	Brasília, Brazil	Autódromo Internacional Nelson Piquet	October 29–30	(Brazil) Fabiano Machado	(Brazil) Fabiano Machado	(Brazil) Fabiano Machado
9	Campo Grande, Brazil	Autódromo Internacional Orlando Moura	17 December	(Brazil) Fabiano Machado	(Brazil) Victor Guerin	—N/a

=== Class A standings ===
Pos	Driver	Team	Points
1	(Brazil) Fabiano Machado	Cesário Fórmula	536
2	(Brazil) Ronaldo Freitas	Cesário Fórmula	331
3	(Brazil) Guilherme Silva	Hitech Racing Brazil	245
4	(Brazil) Fernando Resende	Cesário Fórmula; Hitech Racing Brazil	221
5	(Brazil) Leonardo de Souza	Kemba Racing	164
6	(Brazil) João Leme	Hitech Racing Brazil	127
7	(Brazil) Victor Guerin	Cesário Fórmula	43
8	(Argentina) Jean Catalano	Hitech Racing Brazil	27
9	(Brazil) Denis Navarro	Cesário Fórmula	18
10	(Brazil) Felipe Guimarães	Cesário Fórmula	12
11	(Argentina) Agustín Canapino	Hitech Racing Brazil	10
	(Brazil) Jonathan Mello	Kemba Racing	0
	(Brazil) Dorivaldo Gondra, Jr.	Kemba Racing	0
	(Brazil) Galid Osman	Hitech Racing Brazil	0
	(Brazil) Paulo Bonifacio	Cesário Fórmula	0
	(Brazil) Leandro Florenzo	Cesário Fórmula	0
	(Brazil) Roberto Savério	Hitech Racing Brazil	0
	(Brazil) Roberto Streit	Cesário Fórmula	0
	(Brazil) Rafael Isenhard	Hitech Racing Brazil	0

=== Class B standings ===
Pos	Driver	Team	Points
1	(Brazil) Bruno Bonifacio	Cesário Fórmula Jr.	318
2	(Brazil) Ricardo Landucci	Cesário Fórmula Jr.	204
3	(Brazil) Luir Miranda	Cesário Fórmula Jr.	68
4	(Argentina) Augusto Scalbi	Cesário Fórmula Jr.	61
5	(United Kingdom) Stuart Turvey	Dragão Motorsport	54
6	(Argentina) Hernán Bueno	Cesário Fórmula Jr.	45
7	(Brazil) Higor Hofmann	Cesário Fórmula Jr.	43
8	(Brazil) Suzane Carvalho	Cesário Fórmula Jr.	40
9	(Brazil) Beto Monteiro	Cesário Fórmula Jr.	25
10	(Argentina) Buno Etman	Cesário Fórmula Jr.	25
11	(Brazil) Carlos Teixeira	Kemba Racing	18
12	(Brazil) Fernando Junior	Cesário Fórmula Jr.	18
13	(Brazil) Vinícius Alvarenga	Dragão Motorsport; Cesário Formula Jr.	15
14	(Brazil) Ricardo Landi	Cesário Fórmula Jr.	15
15	(Brazil) Daniel Politzer	Kemba Racing	12
16	(Brazil) Felipe Polehtto	Cesário Fórmula Jr.	12
	(Brazil) Dorivaldo Gondra, Jr.	Kemba Racing	0
	(Brazil) Jonathan Mello	Kemba Racing	0
	(Brazil) Matheus Stumpf	Cesário Fórmula Jr.	0
	(Brazil) Luiz Boesel	Cesário Fórmula Jr.	0
