= Duarte Ferreira =

Angolan racing driver

- Nationality: Angolan
- Born: 1 November 1992 (age 34) Lisbon, Portugal

NASCAR K&N Pro Series East career
- Debut season: 2012
- Current team: X Team Racing
- Car number: 16
- Starts: 2
- Wins: 0
- Poles: 0

Previous series
- 2011 2010 2009: Firestone Indy Lights; Formula Three Sudamericana; Formula Renault 1.6 Belgium

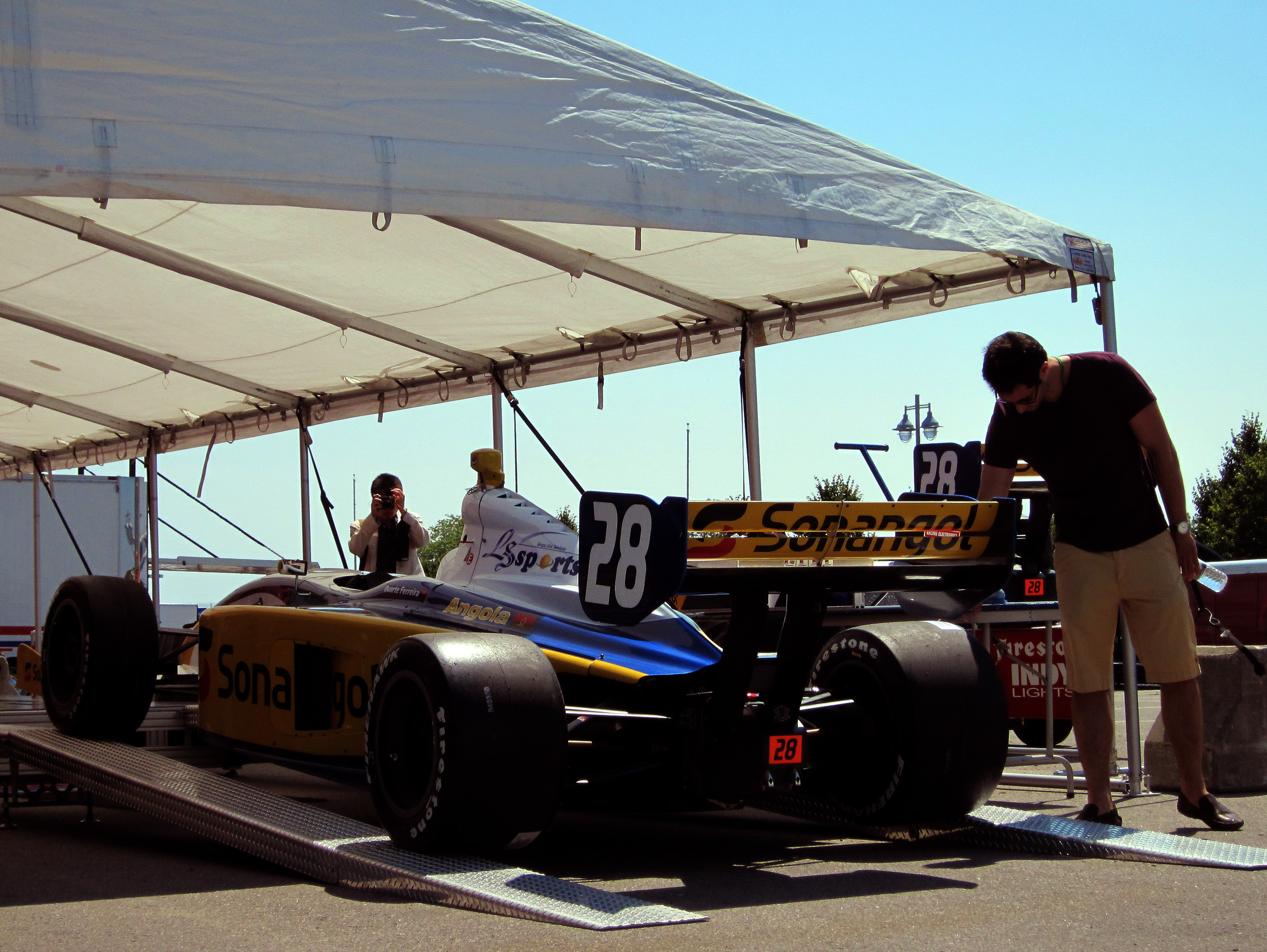
Ferreira's number 28 before 2011 Indy Lights race in Toronto

Duarte Ferreira (born 1 November 1992 in Lisbon, Portugal) is a Portuguese-born Angolan racing driver, residing in Luanda.

Ferreira began his career in karting in Belgium. He then progressed to Formula Renault 1.6 Belgium. In 2010, he competed in Formula Three Sudamericana Lights and finished third in the championship, capturing five class wins and three overall podium finishes in the series' three races at Velopark. In 2011, he raced in Firestone Indy Lights with the Bryan Herta Autosport team. Ferreira finished eighth in points with a best finish of third on the oval at New Hampshire Motor Speedway. He also recorded the fastest lap of the race at Kentucky Speedway.

In 2012, Ferreira ran limited schedules in both Indy Lights and the NASCAR K&N Pro Series East stock car series.

== Indy Lights Results ==
Year	Team	1	2	3	4	5	6	7	8	9	10	11	12	13	14	Rank	Points	Ref
2011	Bryan Herta Autosport	STP; 8	ALA; 7	LBH; 14	INDY; 13	MIL; 12	IOW; 5	TOR; 10	EDM1; 8	EDM2; 9	TRO; 8	NHM; 3	BAL; 10	KTY; 6	LVS; 11	8th	323	
