= Pietro Fantin =

Brazilian racing driver (born 1991)

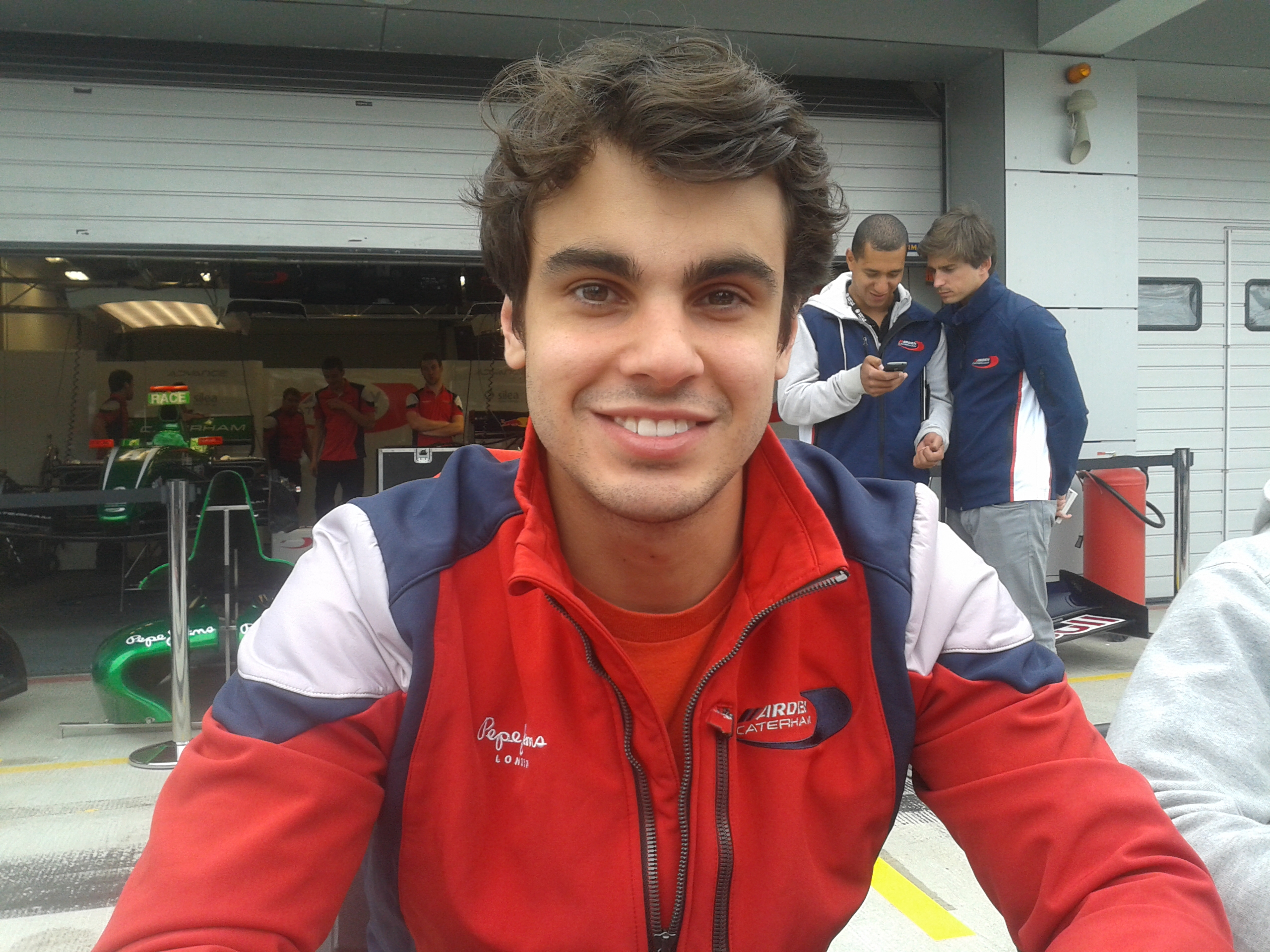
- Fantin in 2013
- Nationality: Brazilian
- Born: 28 November 1991 (age 34) Curitiba, Brazil

Formula Renault 3.5 Series career
- Debut season: 2013
- Current team: International Draco Racing
- Categorisation: FIA Silver
- Car number: 19
- Former teams: Arden Caterham
- Starts: 47
- Wins: 0
- Poles: 0
- Fastest laps: 3
- Best finish: 10th in 2015

Previous series
- 2010–12 2010: British Formula 3 Formula 3 Sudamericana

Pietro Fantin (born 28 November 1991 in Curitiba) is a Brazilian racing driver.

== Career ==
Fantin began his racing career in karting, where he remained until 2009. In 2010, he began his formula racing career. For Hitech Racing Brazil, he participated in nine of 24 races in the Formula Three Sudamericana. He won three races and achieved five podium finishes. In the championship, he concluded the season in the ninth position. Moreover, he completed nine starts as a guest driver for Hitech Racing in the 2010 British Formula 3 season. In 2011, he competed in the British Formula 3 Championship as a regular driver of Hitech Racing. Fantin finished the 2011 season on eighth position.

For 2012, Fantin would drive for Carlin in the British Formula 3 Championship.

== Racing record ==
=== Career summary ===
Season	Series	Team name	Races	Poles	Wins	Podiums	F/Laps	Points	Final Placing
2010	Formula 3 Sudamericana	Hitech Racing Brazil	9	2	3	5	5	108	9th
2010	British Formula 3	Hitech Racing	9	0	0	0	0	81	NC†
2011	British Formula 3	Hitech Racing	30	3	1	4	1	119	8th
2011	Macau Grand Prix	Hitech Racing	1	0	0	0	0	N/A	11th
2012	British Formula 3	Carlin	28	0	0	6	3	195	7th
2013	Formula Renault 3.5 Series	Arden Caterham	17	0	0	0	0	14	21st
2014	Formula Renault 3.5 Series	International Draco Racing	17	0	0	1	2	34	15th
2015	Formula Renault 3.5 Series	International Draco Racing	13	0	0	1	1	61	10th
2026	Porsche Carrera Cup Brasil								

† – As Fantin was a guest driver, he was ineligible for points.

=== Complete Formula Renault 3.5 Series results ===
(key) (Races in bold indicate pole position) (Races in italics indicate fastest lap)

Year	Team	1	2	3	4	5	6	7	8	9	10	11	12	13	14	15	16	17	Pos	Points
2013	Arden Caterham	MNZ; 1 Ret	MNZ; 2; 7	ALC; 1 Ret	ALC; 2; 18	MON; 1 Ret	SPA; 1; 16	SPA; 2; 12	MSC; 1; 18	MSC; 2; 8	RBR; 1 Ret	RBR; 2; 9	HUN; 1 Ret	HUN; 2; 14	LEC; 1; 11	LEC; 2; 12	CAT; 1; 9	CAT; 2; 20	21st	14
2014	International Draco Racing	MNZ; 1; 11	MNZ; 2; 8	ALC; 1; 10	ALC; 2; 12	MON; 1; 15	SPA; 1 Ret	SPA; 2 Ret	MSC; 1; 3	MSC; 2 Ret	NÜR; 1; 7	NÜR; 2 Ret	HUN; 1 Ret	HUN; 2; 11	LEC; 1 Ret	LEC; 2; 20	JER; 1 Ret	JER; 2; 6	15th	34
2015	International Draco Racing	ALC; 1; 6	ALC; 2; 11	MON; 1; 5	SPA; 1 Ret	SPA; 2; 8	HUN; 1 Ret	HUN; 2; 8	RBR; 1; 13	RBR; 2; 4	SIL; 1; 11	SIL; 2; 3	NÜR; 1; 7	NÜR; 2; 9	BUG; 1	BUG; 2	JER; 1	JER; 2	10th	61
