= Bruno Andrade (racing driver) =

Brazilian racing driver (born 1991)

- Nationality: (Brazil) Brazilian
- Born: February 6, 1991 (age 35) São Paulo (Brazil)

Previous series
- 2011 2010 2009–10 2009: Firestone Indy Lights; Formula 3 Brazil Open; Fórmula Three Sudamericana; Formula São Paulo

Championship titles
- 2009 2010: Formula São Paulo; Fórmula Three Sudamericana

Bruno Andrade (born February 6, 1991) is a Brazilian racing driver.

== Career ==
=== Karting ===
Andrade began his racing career in karting in 2004. He continued karting in junior categories in 2005 and 2006.

In 2007, Andrade became champion São Paulo kart, Graduates in category B. In 2008, he was runner-up Grand Prix RBC, Graduate category A.

=== Formula Three Sudamericana ===
In 2009, Andrade competed in Formula Three Sudamericana Lights finishing third and Formula São Paulo where he won the championship.

Andrade moved up to the main championship in 2010 and won four of the first six races. In the last race, he was in third and his closest championship challenger, Yann Cunha, the only one who could take the championship from him, was behind him. In a controversial turn of events, Cunha made contact with Andrade during the race and Cunha won the championship by four points, but Andrade was declared champion of the Formula Three Sudamericana in 2010, official result was decided in court on March 30, 2012, in Rio de Janeiro. Cunha, was disqualified from the last race as a result of the collision with Andrade.

=== Indy Lights ===
Andrade made his Firestone Indy Lights debut at the Honda Indy Toronto race weekend driving for Bryan Herta Autosport as teammate to former F3 Sudamericana teammate Duarte Ferreira. He competed in that race as well as the next three and had a best finish of sixth in the first race of the double-header in Edmonton.

== Racing record ==
=== Career summary ===
Season	Series	Team name	Races	Poles	Wins	Podiums	F/Laps	Points	Position
2009	Formula São Paulo	MX Sports	8	6	6	7	7	118	1st
2009	Formula 3 Sudamericana Light Class	MX Sports	18	2	3	14	2	110	3rd
2010	Formula 3 Brazil Open	Razia Sports	1	0	0	0	0	N/A	4th
2010	Formula 3 Sudamericana	Cesário Fórmula	24	6	5	16	7	361	1st
2011	Indy Lights	Bryan Herta Autosport	5	0	0	0	0	112	17th

=== Indy Lights ===
Year	Team	1	2	3	4	5	6	7	8	9	10	11	12	13	14	Rank	Points	Ref
2011	Bryan Herta Autosport	STP	ALA	LBH	INDY	MIL	IOW	TOR; 11	EDM; 6	EDM; 15	TRO; 12	NHM	BAL; 4	KTY	LVS	17th	112	

Sporting positions
Preceded by Leonardo Cordeiro	Formula Three Sudamericana Champion; 2010	Succeeded by Fabiano Machado
