= 2011 Indy Lights =

26th season of the motor racing event

2011 Indy Lights season
- Firestone Indy Lights

Season
- Races: 13
- Start date: March 27
- End date: October 16

Awards
- Drivers' champion: (United States) Josef Newgarden
- Teams' champion: (United States) Sam Schmidt Motorsports
- Rookie of the Year: (United States) Josef Newgarden

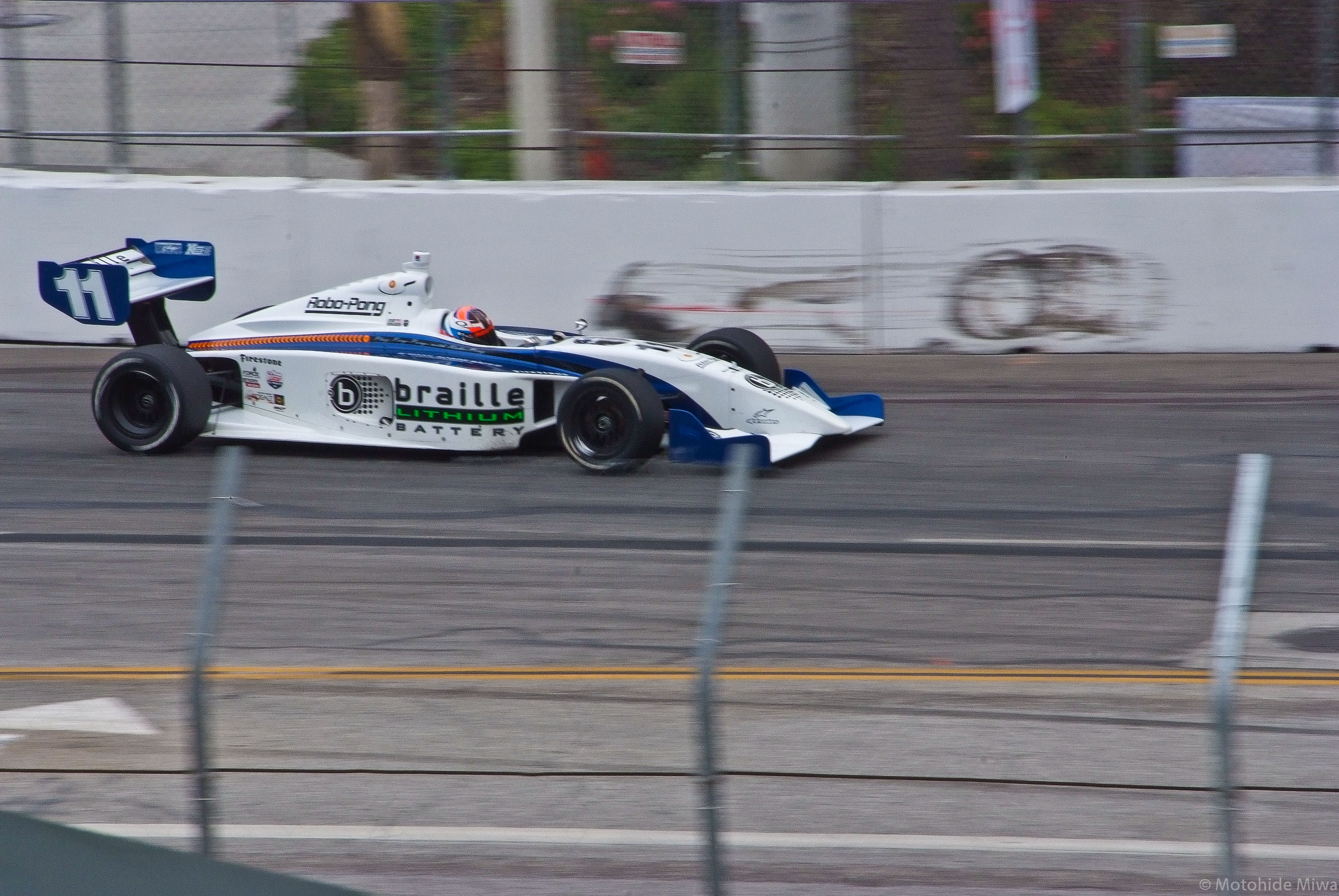
2011 champion, Josef Newgarden

The 2011 Indy Lights season was a season of open wheel motor racing. It was the 26th season of the series and the tenth sanctioned by IndyCar, acting as the primary support series for the IZOD IndyCar Series. It began March 27, 2011 in St. Petersburg and ended on October 16 at the Las Vegas Motor Speedway and featured thirteen events: six on ovals, one on a permanent road course, and six on temporary street courses. The series was won by American driver Josef Newgarden, driving for Sam Schmidt Motorsports. Newgarden won the title by 94 points over teammate and fellow rookie Esteban Guerrieri of Argentina.

The season featured the series' first non-IndyCar Series support race since the 2007 Liberty Challenge (at the Indianapolis Motor Speedway) when it was the main event at the Grand Prix de Trois-Rivières. It was Indy Lights' first event at Trois-Rivières since 1998. The series also race at the New Hampshire Motor Speedway for the first time since 1995 and the new Baltimore street circuit in support of the IndyCars.

== Team and driver chart ==
- All drivers will compete in Firestone Firehawk–shod, Dallara chassis.

| Team | # | Drivers | Rounds |
|---|---|---|---|
| (United States) Sam Schmidt Motorsports | 3 | (Brazil) Victor Carbone | All |
| (United States) Sam Schmidt Motorsports | 7 | (Argentina) Esteban Guerrieri | All |
| (United States) Sam Schmidt Motorsports | 11 | (United States) Josef Newgarden | All |
| (United States) Sam Schmidt Motorsports | 77 | (United States) Conor Daly | 1-3, 9, 11 |
| (United States) Sam Schmidt Motorsports | 77 | (United States) Bryan Clauson | 4-6, 10, 12–13 |
| (United States) Sam Schmidt Motorsports | 77 | (United States) Daniel Herrington | 7-8 |
| (United States) Team Moore Racing | 2 | (Colombia) Gustavo Yacamán | All |
| (United States) Team Moore Racing | 22 | (Spain) Víctor García | 1-7 |
| (United States) Team Moore Racing | 22 | (Canada) Daniel Morad | 8 |
| (United States) Team Moore Racing | 22 | (Canada) Mikaël Grenier | 9 |
| (United States) Team Moore Racing | 22 | (United States) Brandon Wagner | 10, 12–13 |
| (United States) Team Moore Racing | 22 | (Estonia) Tõnis Kasemets | 11 |
| (United States) Andretti Autosport | 5 | (United Kingdom) Stefan Wilson | All |
| (United States) Andretti Autosport | 26 | (United Kingdom) James Winslow | 1-4, |
| (United States) Andretti Autosport | 26 | (Republic of Ireland) Peter Dempsey | 7-9, 11 |
| (United States) Bryan Herta Autosport | 28 | (Angola) Duarte Ferreira | All |
| (United States) Bryan Herta Autosport | 29 | (Brazil) Bruno Andrade | 7-9, 11 |
| (United States) Davey Hamilton Racing | 32 | (United States) Brandon Wagner | 4-6 |
| (United States) Davey Hamilton Racing | 32 | (Canada) Stefan Rzadzinski | 8 |
| (United States) O2 Racing Technology | 36 | (Republic of Ireland) Peter Dempsey | 1-5 |
| (United States) O2 Racing Technology | 63 | (Canada) Mikaël Grenier | 1-4 |
| (United States) Team E | 17 | (United States) Joel Miller | 1 |
| (United States) Team E | 17 | (United States) Rusty Mitchell | 3–4, 11-13 |
| (United States) Belardi Auto Racing | 4 | (Venezuela) Jorge Goncalvez | All |
| (United States) Belardi Auto Racing | 9 | (Norway) Anders Krohn | All |
| (United States) Belardi Auto Racing | 19 | (United States) Jacob Wilson | 12-13 |
| (Canada) Jensen MotorSport | 12 | (Mexico) Juan Pablo Garcia | 1-4 |
| (Canada) Jensen MotorSport | 12 | (Canada) Eric Jensen | 7 |
| (Canada) Jensen MotorSport | 12 | (United Kingdom) Oliver Webb | 8, 11, 13 |
| (Canada) Jensen MotorSport | 16 | (Canada) David Ostella | All |
| (United States) Brooks Associates Racing | 8 | (United States) Ryan Phinny | 3 |
| (United States) Willy T. Ribbs Racing | 32 | (United States) Willy T. Ribbs | 11 |
| (United States) Willy T. Ribbs Racing | 75 | (United States) Chase Austin | 4, 6 |
| (United States) Goree Multisports | 44 | (Canada) Tyler Dueck | 8 |

== Schedule ==
| Rnd | Date | Race Name | Track | Location |
|---|---|---|---|---|
| 1 | March 27 | (United States) Firestone Indy Lights Grand Prix of St. Petersburg | Streets of St. Petersburg | St. Petersburg, FL |
| 2 | April 10 | (United States) Firestone Indy Lights Grand Prix of Alabama | Barber Motorsports Park | Birmingham, AL |
| 3 | April 17 | (United States) Long Beach 100 | Streets of Long Beach | Long Beach, CA |
| 4 | May 27 | (United States) Firestone Freedom 100 | Indianapolis Motor Speedway | Speedway, IN |
| 5 | June 19 | (United States) David Hobbs 100 | Milwaukee Mile | West Allis, WI |
| 6 | June 25 | (United States) Sukup 100 | Iowa Speedway | Newton, IA |
| 7 | July 10 | (Canada) Toronto 100 | Streets of Toronto | Toronto, ON |
| 8A | July 23 | (Canada) Edmonton Twin 100s Race 1 | Edmonton City Centre Airport | Edmonton, Alberta |
| 8B | July 24 | (Canada) Edmonton Twin 100s Race 2 | Edmonton City Centre Airport | Edmonton, Alberta |
| 9 | August 7 | (Canada) Grand Prix de Trois-Rivières | Circuit Trois-Rivières | Trois-Rivières, QC |
| 10 | August 14 | (United States) New Hampshire 100 | New Hampshire Motor Speedway | Loudon, NH |
| 11 | September 4 | (United States) Baltimore 100 | Streets of Baltimore | Baltimore, MD |
| 12 | October 2 | (United States) Drive Smart Buckle-Up Kentucky 100 | Kentucky Speedway | Sparta, KY |
| 13 | October 16 | (United States) Las Vegas 100 | Las Vegas Motor Speedway | Las Vegas, Nevada |

Oval/Speedway
Street/Temporary Circuit
Road Course

== Race results ==
| Rd. | Race | Pole position | Fastest lap | Most laps led | Winning driver | Winning team |
|---|---|---|---|---|---|---|
| 1 | (United States) St. Petersburg | (Argentina) Esteban Guerrieri | (United States) Conor Daly | (United States) Josef Newgarden | (United States) Josef Newgarden | (United States) Sam Schmidt Motorsports |
| 2 | (United States) Barber | (Spain) Víctor García | (Spain) Víctor García | (Spain) Víctor García | (Spain) Víctor García | (United States) Team Moore Racing |
| 3 | (United States) Long Beach | (Argentina) Esteban Guerrieri | (United States) Conor Daly | (United States) Josef Newgarden | (United States) Conor Daly | (United States) Sam Schmidt Motorsports |
| 4 | (United States) Indianapolis | (United States) Bryan Clauson | (United States) Brandon Wagner | (United States) Josef Newgarden | (United States) Josef Newgarden | (United States) Sam Schmidt Motorsports |
| 5 | (United States) Milwaukee | (Argentina) Esteban Guerrieri | (United States) Josef Newgarden | (Argentina) Esteban Guerrieri | (Argentina) Esteban Guerrieri | (United States) Sam Schmidt Motorsports |
| 6 | (United States) Iowa | (Argentina) Esteban Guerrieri | (United States) Bryan Clauson | (United States) Josef Newgarden | (United States) Josef Newgarden | (United States) Sam Schmidt Motorsports |
| 7 | (Canada) Toronto | (Argentina) Esteban Guerrieri | (Argentina) Esteban Guerrieri | (United Kingdom) Stefan Wilson | (United Kingdom) Stefan Wilson | (United States) Andretti Autosport |
| 8A | (Canada) Edmonton | (United States) Josef Newgarden | (United States) Josef Newgarden | (Argentina) Esteban Guerrieri | (Argentina) Esteban Guerrieri | (United States) Sam Schmidt Motorsports |
| 8B | (Canada) Edmonton | (United States) Josef Newgarden | (Argentina) Esteban Guerrieri | (United States) Josef Newgarden | (United States) Josef Newgarden | (United States) Sam Schmidt Motorsports |
| 9 | (Canada) Trois-Rivières | (Argentina) Esteban Guerrieri | (Argentina) Esteban Guerrieri | (Argentina) Esteban Guerrieri | (Argentina) Esteban Guerrieri | (United States) Sam Schmidt Motorsports |
| 10 | (United States) Loudon | (United States) Josef Newgarden | (United States) Josef Newgarden | (United States) Josef Newgarden | (United States) Josef Newgarden | (United States) Sam Schmidt Motorsports |
| 11 | (United States) Baltimore | (United States) Conor Daly | (United States) Josef Newgarden | (United States) Conor Daly | (Colombia) Gustavo Yacamán | (United States) Team Moore Racing |
| 12 | (United States) Kentucky | (United Kingdom) Stefan Wilson | (Angola) Duarte Ferreira | (United Kingdom) Stefan Wilson | (United Kingdom) Stefan Wilson | (United States) Andretti Autosport |
| 13 | (United States) Las Vegas | (Brazil) Victor Carbone | (United Kingdom) Stefan Wilson | (United States) Josef Newgarden | (Brazil) Victor Carbone | (United States) Sam Schmidt Motorsports |

== Race summaries ==
=== Round 1: Streets of St. Petersburg ===
- Sunday March 27, 2011 – 10:30 a.m. EDT
- Streets of St. Petersburg – St. Petersburg, Florida; Temporary street circuit, 1.800 miles (2.897 km)
- Distance: 45 laps / 81.000 miles (130.357 km)
- Race weather: 81 °F (27 °C), partly cloudy
- Pole position winner: #7 Esteban Guerrieri, 1:07.6903 sec, 95.730 mph (154.063 km/h)
- Most laps led: #11 Josef Newgarden, 34
- Race Report:

Podium Finishers
| Pos | Grid | No. | Driver | Team | Laps | Time | Led |
|---|---|---|---|---|---|---|---|
| 1 | 3 | 11 | (United States) Josef Newgarden | Sam Schmidt Motorsports | 45 | 56:11.0037 | 34 |
| 2 | 2 | 77 | (United States) Conor Daly | Sam Schmidt Motorsports | 45 | +0.8552 | 0 |
| 3 | 5 | 36 | (Republic of Ireland) Peter Dempsey | O2 Racing Technology | 45 | +3.1351 | 11 |
Race average speed: 86.502 mph (139.211 km/h)
Lead changes: 1 between 2 drivers
Cautions: 1 for 5 laps

=== Round 2: Barber Motorsports Park ===
- Sunday April 10, 2011 – 12:15 p.m. CDT (1:15 p.m. EDT)
- Barber Motorsports Park – Birmingham, Alabama; Permanent road course, 2.300 miles (3.701 km)
- Distance: 40 laps / 92.000 miles (148.060 km)
- Race weather: 80 °F (27 °C), partly cloudy
- Pole position winner: #22 Víctor García, 1:17.2793 sec, 107.144 mph (172.432 km/h)
- Most laps led: #22 Víctor García, 40
- Race Report: Víctor García took the first victory of his open-wheel racing career after taking a flag-to-flag to victory despite pressure from Stefan Wilson for the majority of the race, seeing his lead twice dwindled by caution periods. Peter Dempsey took his second placing of third in as many races as he moved into second place in the championship standings. Championship leader Josef Newgarden held on to his championship lead despite having to make a pit-stop to replace a flat front tire, but recovered to finish in sixth position in the race. The race was punctuated by three caution periods, the first of which being on the first lap after Newgarden made contact with Esteban Guerrieri which sent Guerrieri into contact with teammate Victor Carbone, eliminating Guerrieri on the spot and Carbone in the pits. The other two periods were caused by drivers running off track; Gustavo Yacamán ran off-track on lap four, but managed to restart several laps down, but the other period caused by David Ostella, did not see Ostella restart.

Podium Finishers
| Pos | Grid | No. | Driver | Team | Laps | Time | Led |
|---|---|---|---|---|---|---|---|
| 1 | 1 | 22 | (Spain) Víctor García | Team Moore Racing | 40 | 1:00:06.5806 | 40 |
| 2 | 3 | 5 | (United Kingdom) Stefan Wilson | Andretti Autosport | 40 | +0.3125 | 0 |
| 3 | 8 | 36 | (Republic of Ireland) Peter Dempsey | O2 Racing Technology | 40 | +16.3249 | 0 |
Race average speed: 91.832 mph (147.789 km/h)
Lead changes: None
Cautions: 3 for 7 laps

=== Round 3: Long Beach 100 ===
- Sunday April 17, 2011 – 11:05 a.m. PDT (2:05 p.m. EDT)
- Streets of Long Beach – Long Beach, California; Temporary street circuit, 1.968 miles (3.167 km)
- Distance: 45 laps / 88.560 miles (142.524 km); reduced to 43 laps / 84.624 miles (136.189 km) due to 1-hour time limit
- Race weather: 63 °F (17 °C), cloudy
- Pole position winner: #7 Esteban Guerrieri, 1:13.6957 sec, 96.136 mph (154.716 km/h)
- Most laps led: #11 Josef Newgarden, 31
- Race Report: Conor Daly became the series' third different winner in the 2011 season, after taking advantage of a late-race mistake by team-mate and championship leader Josef Newgarden. After a waved off start to the race, Esteban Guerrieri in another Sam Schmidt car led the field from pole, but did not lead the race beyond that after being passed by Peter Dempsey at Turn 9. Dempsey held the lead until lap ten when he hit the wall at the same corner, knocking himself out of the race. Newgarden then picked up the lead from Guerrieri and Daly; Daly overhauling Guerrieri at the restart, and started to hunt down Newgarden. With a few minutes remaining, Newgarden's car hopped under the bumps, snatched a brake and ended up in the turn eight tire wall. Daly led the field under the caution to the timed ending of the race which curtailed the race two laps early. Guerrieri finished second ahead of Stefan Wilson, who finished third despite a trip down an escape road.

Podium Finishers
| Pos | Grid | No. | Driver | Team | Laps | Time | Led |
|---|---|---|---|---|---|---|---|
| 1 | 4 | 77 | (United States) Conor Daly | Sam Schmidt Motorsports | 43 | 1:00:35.2947 | 3 |
| 2 | 1 | 7 | (Argentina) Esteban Guerrieri | Sam Schmidt Motorsports | 43 | +0.9302* | 1 |
| 3 | 6 | 5 | (United Kingdom) Stefan Wilson | Andretti Autosport | 43 | +1.3880 | 0 |
* Under caution
Race average speed: 83.802 mph (134.866 km/h)
Lead changes: 3 between 4 drivers
Cautions: 4 for 8 laps

=== Round 4: Firestone Freedom 100 ===
- Friday May 27, 2011 – 12:30 p.m. EDT
- Indianapolis Motor Speedway – Speedway, Indiana; Permanent racing facility, 2.500 miles (4.023 km)
- Distance: 40 laps / 100.000 miles (160.934 km)
- Race weather: 56 °F (13 °C), overcast
- Pole position winner: #77 Bryan Clauson (qualifying cancelled; field set by owner points)
- Most laps led: #11 Josef Newgarden, 30
- Race Report:

Josef Newgarden took his second series victory, and with erstwhile championship leader Conor Daly not contesting the oval events of the championship, Newgarden assumed the championship lead. Newgarden's Sam Schmidt Motorsports teammate, Bryan Clauson dropped back from his début pole, with Newgarden and Víctor García each leading part of the first lap before Newgarden assumed it at the line. Stefan Wilson, Anders Krohn and Esteban Guerrieri also led the race at stages prior to Newgarden taking the lead for good on lap 15. Krohn had undone his work to advance to the front by spinning under caution – after Victor Carbone's crash – which put him to the rear of the field, but pitted for new tires, and eventually made his way back up the field. The second caution period was caused by Gustavo Yacamán spinning into the wall and was eventually collected by Juan Pablo Garcia and James Winslow. Yacamán was transferred to Methodist Hospital with neck pain.

After Peter Dempsey spun under the yellow, Duarte Ferreira brought out the third caution a lap after the restart, spinning in Turn 2 and collected the car of Brandon Wagner, ending the race for both drivers. After a waved off restart, again one lap was run before a caution period was necessitated; Clauson, Krohn and Krohn's Belardi teammate Jorge Goncalvez went three-wide into Turn 1, with Goncalvez clipping the rear-left tire of Clauson's car. Krohn spun in avoidance, as Goncalvez went into the barrier on the outside of Turn 1, before impacting the inside wall halfway down the straight between Turns 1 and 2. The impact broke the car into two pieces with the tub going onto its side along the track before hitting the retaining wall in Turn 2 and righted what was left of the car. Goncalvez was also transferred to Methodist, but was said to be alert and awake. The debris from the crash prevented the race from returning to green – resulting in an end tally of 22 of the race's 40 laps running under caution – and Newgarden took victory ahead of teammate Guerrieri, Víctor García, Wilson and Clauson, with only 10 of the 18 cars that started the race running at the flag.

Podium Finishers
| Pos | Grid | No. | Driver | Team | Laps | Time | Led |
|---|---|---|---|---|---|---|---|
| 1 | 2 | 11 | (United States) Josef Newgarden | Sam Schmidt Motorsports | 40 | 55:38.9881 | 30 |
| 2 | 5 | 7 | (Argentina) Esteban Guerrieri | Sam Schmidt Motorsports | 40 | +0.4443* | 2 |
| 3 | 4 | 22 | (Spain) Víctor García | Team Moore Racing | 40 | +0.8010 | 0 |
* Under caution
Race average speed: 107.817 mph (173.515 km/h)
Lead changes: 6 between 4 drivers
Cautions: 4 for 22 laps

=== Round 5: David Hobbs 100 ===
- Sunday June 19, 2011 – 1:00 p.m. CDT (2:00 p.m. EDT)
- Milwaukee Mile – West Allis, Wisconsin; Permanent racing facility, 1.015 miles (1.633 km)
- Distance: 100 laps / 101.500 miles (163.348 km)
- Race weather: 79 °F (26 °C), overcast
- Pole position winner: #7 Esteban Guerrieri, 49.0454 sec, 149.005 mph (239.800 km/h) (2-lap)
- Most laps led: #7 Esteban Guerrieri, 100
- Race Report:

Podium Finishers
| Pos | Grid | No. | Driver | Team | Laps | Time | Led |
|---|---|---|---|---|---|---|---|
| 1 | 1 | 7 | (Argentina) Esteban Guerrieri | Sam Schmidt Motorsports | 100 | 46:45.6824 | 100 |
| 2 | 2 | 11 | (United States) Josef Newgarden | Sam Schmidt Motorsports | 100 | +5.5012 | 0 |
| 3 | 7 | 4 | (Venezuela) Jorge Goncalvez | Belardi Auto Racing | 100 | +6.6182 | 0 |
Race average speed: 130.236 mph (209.595 km/h)
Lead changes: None
Cautions: 1 for 5 laps

=== Round 6: Sukup 100 ===
- Saturday June 25, 2011 – 5:40 p.m. CDT (6:40 p.m. EDT)
- Iowa Speedway – Newton, Iowa; Permanent racing facility, 0.894 miles (1.439 km)
- Distance: 115 laps / 102.810 miles (165.457 km)
- Race weather: 64 °F (18 °C), overcast
- Pole position winner: #7 Esteban Guerrieri, 40.0332 sec, 160.787 mph (258.762 km/h) (2-lap)
- Most laps led: #11 Josef Newgarden, 90
- Race Report:

Podium Finishers
| Pos | Grid | No. | Driver | Team | Laps | Time | Led |
|---|---|---|---|---|---|---|---|
| 1 | 4 | 11 | (United States) Josef Newgarden | Sam Schmidt Motorsports | 115 | 40:27.3417 | 90 |
| 2 | 2 | 2 | (Colombia) Gustavo Yacamán | Team Moore Racing | 115 | +5.4724 | 0 |
| 3 | 3 | 77 | (United States) Bryan Clauson | Sam Schmidt Motorsports | 115 | +5.8169 | 0 |
Race average speed: 152.478 mph (245.390 km/h)
Lead changes: 1 between 2 drivers
Cautions: 2 for 4 laps

=== Round 7: Toronto 100 ===
- Sunday July 10, 2011 – 12:15 p.m. EDT
- Streets of Toronto – Toronto, Ontario; Temporary street circuit, 1.755 miles (2.824 km)
- Distance: 50 laps / 87.750 miles (141.220 km); reduced to 49 laps / 85.995 miles (138.396 km) due to 1-hour time limit
- Race weather: 77 °F (25 °C), cloudy
- Pole position winner: #7 Esteban Guerrieri, 1:02.9865 sec, 100.307 mph (161.428 km/h)
- Most laps led: #5 Stefan Wilson, 29
- Race Report: Stefan Wilson took his first Indy Lights victory after capitalising on a mistake by pole-sitter Esteban Guerrieri, and led the race for its final 29 laps after Guerrieri had led the first 20. Wilson led home an Andretti Autosport 1–2 after his new team-mate Peter Dempsey finished second, after close battling with both Gustavo Yacamán and championship leader Josef Newgarden. Newgarden would later make contact with Dempsey's car, and had to pit, resulting in an eighth-place finish. Yacamán ended up completing the podium ahead of Guerrieri and Anders Krohn. Four of the 13-car grid failed to reach the finish of the race, all due to contact.

Podium Finishers
| Pos | Grid | No. | Driver | Team | Laps | Time | Led |
|---|---|---|---|---|---|---|---|
| 1 | 2 | 5 | (United Kingdom) Stefan Wilson | Andretti Autosport | 49 | 1:01:02.4296 | 29 |
| 2 | 3 | 26 | (Republic of Ireland) Peter Dempsey | Andretti Autosport | 49 | +0.2238* | 0 |
| 3 | 6 | 2 | (Colombia) Gustavo Yacamán | Team Moore Racing | 49 | +0.5374 | 0 |
* Under caution
Race average speed: 84.529 mph (136.036 km/h)
Lead changes: 1 between 2 drivers
Cautions: 3 for 9 laps

=== Round 8: Edmonton Twin 100s ===
- Saturday July 23, 2011 – 2:00 p.m. MDT (4:00 p.m. EDT) & Sunday July 24, 2011 – 10:20 a.m. MDT (12:20 p.m. EDT)
- Edmonton City Centre Airport – Edmonton, Alberta; Temporary airport course, 2.224 miles (3.579 km)
- Distance: 2 races of 40 laps / 88.960 miles (143.167 km); Race 1 reduced to 36 laps / 80.064 miles (128.851 km) due to 1-hour time limit
- Race weather: 63 °F (17 °C), cloudy (Race 1); 64 °F (18 °C), cloudy (Race 2)
- Pole position winner: #11 Josef Newgarden, 1:22.7721 sec, 96.728 mph (155.669 km/h) (Race 1, qualifying); 1:22.9337 sec, 96.540 mph (155.366 km/h) (Race 2, fastest lap of Race 1)
- Most laps led: #7 Esteban Guerrieri, 36 (Race 1); #11 Josef Newgarden, 27 (Race 2)
- Race Report: Esteban Guerrieri took his second victory of the season, after leading every lap of the race to move closer to his team-mate and championship leader Josef Newgarden. Newgarden had started the race from pole position, but a move by Guerrieri at Turn 5 allowed him to take the lead just before the opening caution of the race, caused by series rookie Tyler Dueck running into the back of David Ostella, and the field concertinaed, with Daniel Morad, Daniel Herrington and Stefan Wilson also involved, with Dueck, Ostella and Morad all out on the spot. Third place went to another series rookie, with Oliver Webb finishing ahead of Wilson with Bruno Andrade just ahead of Gustavo Yacamán to complete the top five placing. The race's only other retirees came as a result of an incident between Victor Carbone and Peter Dempsey. Dempsey tried to take Carbone into Turn 1 on lap 28, with the two drivers interlocking wheels on the corner exit, sending both drivers into the wall. Carbone's car launched Dempsey's car upside-down, but Dempsey emerged without injury. Newgarden comfortably won race two after slight contact with Guerrieri, which left Guerrieri down the order. Wilson and Dempsey completed the podium.

Race One – Podium Finishers
| Pos | Grid | No. | Driver | Team | Laps | Time | Led |
|---|---|---|---|---|---|---|---|
| 1 | 2 | 7 | (Argentina) Esteban Guerrieri | Sam Schmidt Motorsports | 36 | 1:01:11.7536 | 36 |
| 2 | 1 | 11 | (United States) Josef Newgarden | Sam Schmidt Motorsports | 36 | +0.6524 | 0 |
| 3 | 10 | 12 | (United Kingdom) Oliver Webb | Jensen MotorSport | 36 | +7.0479 | 0 |
Race average speed: 78.499 mph (126.332 km/h)
Lead changes: None
Cautions: 3 for 9 laps
Race Two – Podium Finishers
| Pos | Grid | No. | Driver | Team | Laps | Time | Led |
| 1 | 1 | 11 | (United States) Josef Newgarden | Sam Schmidt Motorsports | 40 | 56:46.3800 | 27 |
| 2 | 3 | 5 | (United Kingdom) Stefan Wilson | Andretti Autosport | 40 | +14.5501 | 0 |
| 3 | 6 | 26 | (Republic of Ireland) Peter Dempsey | Andretti Autosport | 40 | +15.2079 | 0 |
Race average speed: 94.017 mph (151.306 km/h)
Lead changes: 2 between 2 drivers
Cautions: None

=== Round 9: Grand Prix de Trois-Rivières ===
- Sunday August 7, 2011 – 1:30 p.m. EDT
- Circuit Trois-Rivières – Trois-Rivières, Quebec; Temporary street circuit, 1.510 miles (2.430 km)
- Distance: 60 laps / 90.600 miles (145.807 km); reduced to 58 laps / 87.580 miles (140.946 km) due to rain
- Race weather: 74 °F (23 °C), cloudy
- Pole position winner: #7 Esteban Guerrieri, 57.4541 sec, 94.615 mph (152.268 km/h)
- Most laps led: #7 Esteban Guerrieri, 58
- Race Report:

Podium Finishers
| Pos | Grid | No. | Driver | Team | Laps | Time | Led |
|---|---|---|---|---|---|---|---|
| 1 | 1 | 7 | (Argentina) Esteban Guerrieri | Sam Schmidt Motorsports | 58 | 1:13:47.0198 | 58 |
| 2 | 5 | 2 | (Colombia) Gustavo Yacamán | Team Moore Racing | 58 | +6.2535 | 0 |
| 3 | 4 | 11 | (United States) Josef Newgarden | Sam Schmidt Motorsports | 58 | +7.7797 | 0 |
Race average speed: 71.219 mph (114.616 km/h)
Lead changes: None
Cautions: 2 for 7 laps

=== Round 10: New Hampshire 100 ===
- Sunday August 14, 2011 – 1:15 p.m. EDT
- New Hampshire Motor Speedway – Loudon, New Hampshire; Permanent racing facility, 1.025 miles (1.650 km)
- Distance: 100 laps / 102.500 miles (164.958 km)
- Race weather: 73 °F (23 °C), overcast
- Pole position winner: #11 Josef Newgarden, 49.4908 sec, 149.119 mph (239.984 km/h) (2-lap)
- Most laps led: #11 Josef Newgarden, 100
- Race Report: Josef Newgarden became the first driver since Thiago Medeiros in 2004 to lap the entire field en route to winning an Indy Lights race, further extending his championship points lead.

Podium Finishers
| Pos | Grid | No. | Driver | Team | Laps | Time | Led |
|---|---|---|---|---|---|---|---|
| 1 | 1 | 11 | (United States) Josef Newgarden | Sam Schmidt Motorsports | 100 | 49:00.0481 | 100 |
| 2 | 5 | 4 | (Venezuela) Jorge Goncalvez | Belardi Auto Racing | 99 | + 1 Lap | 0 |
| 3 | 6 | 28 | (Angola) Duarte Ferreira | Bryan Herta Autosport | 99 | + 1 Lap | 0 |
Race average speed: 125.508 mph (201.986 km/h)
Lead changes: None
Cautions: 3 for 12 laps

=== Round 11: Streets of Baltimore ===
- Sunday September 4, 2011 – 12:15 p.m. EDT
- Streets of Baltimore – Baltimore, Maryland; Temporary street circuit, 2.040 miles (3.283 km)
- Distance: 35 laps / 71.400 miles (114.907 km)
- Race weather: 81 °F (27 °C), scattered clouds
- Pole position winner: #77 Conor Daly, 1:27.8114 sec, 83.631 mph (134.591 km/h)
- Most laps led: #77 Conor Daly, 22
- Race Report:

Podium Finishers
| Pos | Grid | No. | Driver | Team | Laps | Time | Led |
|---|---|---|---|---|---|---|---|
| 1 | 3 | 2 | (Colombia) Gustavo Yacamán | Team Moore Racing | 35 | 57:17.3814 | 4 |
| 2 | 14 | 11 | (United States) Josef Newgarden | Sam Schmidt Motorsports | 35 | +0.4500 | 0 |
| 3 | 7 | 3 | (Brazil) Victor Carbone | Sam Schmidt Motorsports | 35 | +8.1430 | 0 |
Race average speed: 74.778 mph (120.344 km/h)
Lead changes: 3 between 4 drivers
Cautions: 3 for 6 laps

=== Round 12: Drive Smart Buckle-Up Kentucky 100 ===
- Sunday October 2, 2011 – 12:30 p.m. EDT
- Kentucky Speedway – Sparta, Kentucky; Permanent racing facility, 1.480 miles (2.382 km)
- Distance: 67 laps / 99.160 miles (159.583 km)
- Race weather: 56 °F (13 °C), partly cloudy
- Pole position winner: #5 Stefan Wilson, 55.5988 sec, 191.659 mph (308.445 km/h) (2-lap)
- Most laps led: #5 Stefan Wilson, 47
- Race Report:

Podium Finishers
| Pos | Grid | No. | Driver | Team | Laps | Time | Led |
|---|---|---|---|---|---|---|---|
| 1 | 1 | 5 | (United Kingdom) Stefan Wilson | Andretti Autosport | 67 | 41:54.4340 | 47 |
| 2 | 6 | 11 | (United States) Josef Newgarden | Sam Schmidt Motorsports | 67 | +3.1136 | 20 |
| 3 | 4 | 4 | (Venezuela) Jorge Goncalvez | Belardi Auto Racing | 67 | +5.4480 | 0 |
Race average speed: 141.971 mph (228.480 km/h)
Lead changes: 2 between 2 drivers
Cautions: 1 for 14 laps

=== Round 13: Las Vegas 100 ===
- Sunday October 16, 2011 – 9:45 a.m. PDT (12:45 p.m. EDT)
- Las Vegas Motor Speedway – Las Vegas, Nevada; Permanent racing facility, 1.544 miles (2.485 km)
- Distance: 67 laps / 103.448 miles (166.483 km)
- Race weather: 75 °F (24 °C), clear skies
- Pole position winner: #3 Victor Carbone, 57.9685 sec, 191.773 mph (308.629 km/h) (2-lap)
- Most laps led: #11 Josef Newgarden, 63
- Race Report:

Podium Finishers
| Pos | Grid | No. | Driver | Team | Laps | Time | Led |
|---|---|---|---|---|---|---|---|
| 1 | 1 | 3 | (Brazil) Victor Carbone | Sam Schmidt Motorsports | 67 | 35:26.2096 | 2 |
| 2 | 3 | 7 | (Argentina) Esteban Guerrieri | Sam Schmidt Motorsports | 67 | +0.0229 | 0 |
| 3 | 12 | 4 | (Venezuela) Jorge Goncalvez | Belardi Auto Racing | 67 | +0.3642 | 0 |
Race average speed: 175.153 mph (281.881 km/h)
Lead changes: 3 between 3 drivers
Cautions: 1 for 4 laps

== Driver standings ==
| Pos | Driver | STP (United States) | BAR (United States) | LBH (United States) | INDY (United States) | MIL (United States) | IOW (United States) | TOR (Canada) | EDM (Canada) | | TRO (Canada) | LOU (United States) | BAL (United States) | KTY (United States) | LSV (United States) | Pts |
| Pos | Driver | STP (United States) | BAR (United States) | LBH (United States) | INDY (United States) | MIL (United States) | IOW (United States) | TOR (Canada) | R1 | R2 | TRO (Canada) | LOU (United States) | BAL (United States) | KTY (United States) | LSV (United States) | Pts |
|---|---|---|---|---|---|---|---|---|---|---|---|---|---|---|---|---|
| 1 | (United States) Josef Newgarden RY | 1* | 6 | 13* | 1* | 2 | 1* | 8 | **2** | **1*** | 3 | **1*** | 2 | 2 | 9* | 553 |
| 2 | (Argentina) Esteban Guerrieri R | **6** | 15 | **2** | 2 | **1*** | **12** | **4** | 1* | 14 | **1*** | 5 | 12 | 10 | 2 | 459 |
| 3 | (United Kingdom) Stefan Wilson | 16 | 2 | 3 | 4 | 8 | 8 | 1* | 4 | 2 | 4 | 12 | 5 | **1*** | 8 | 450 |
| 4 | (Colombia) Gustavo Yacamán | 14 | 12 | 4 | 15 | 5 | 2 | 3 | 5 | 16 | 2 | 4 | 1 | 11 | 4 | 403 |
| 5 | (Venezuela) Jorge Goncalvez R | 11 | 4 | 10 | 11 | 3 | 6 | 6 | 7 | 12 | 9 | 2 | 16 | 3 | 3 | 371 |
| 6 | (Brazil) Victor Carbone R | 9 | 14 | 6 | 18 | 6 | 7 | 9 | 11 | 4 | 10 | 10 | 3 | 7 | **1** | 357 |
| 7 | (Norway) Anders Krohn R | 5 | 9 | 8 | 12 | 9 | 11 | 5 | 13 | 6 | 6 | 11 | 6 | 13 | 7 | 328 |
| 8 | (Angola) Duarte Ferreira R | 8 | 7 | 14 | 13 | 12 | 5 | 10 | 8 | 9 | 8 | 3 | 10 | 6 | 11 | 323 |
| 9 | (Canada) David Ostella R | 4 | 13 | 9 | 8 | 7 | 9 | 13 | 14 | 8 | 7 | 6 | 15 | 12 | | 287 |
| 10 | (Republic of Ireland) Peter Dempsey R | 3 | 3 | 17 | 6 | DNS | | 2 | 12 | 3 | 5 | | 9 | | | 264 |
| 11 | (Spain) Víctor García R | 15 | **1*** | 12 | 3 | 10 | 4 | 7 | | | | | | | | 199 |
| 12 | (United States) Bryan Clauson R | | | | **5**^{1} | 4 | 3 | | | | | 7 | | 5 | 13 | 170 |
| 13 | (United States) Conor Daly R | 2 | 11 | 1 | | | | | | | 13 | | **14*** | | | 145 |
| 14 | (United States) Rusty Mitchell R | | | 11 | 7 | | | | | | | 8 | 7 | 8 | 12 | 137 |
| 15 | (United States) Brandon Wagner | | | | 14 | 11 | 13 | | | | | 9 | | 4 | 6 | 134 |
| 16 | (Canada) Mikaël Grenier R | 7 | 5 | 7 | 10 | | | | | | 11 | | | | | 121 |
| 17 | (Brazil) Bruno Andrade R | | | | | | | 11 | 6 | 15 | 12 | | 4 | | | 112 |
| 18 | (United Kingdom) Oliver Webb R | | | | | | | | 3 | 5 | | | 11 | | 10 | 104 |
| 19 | (United Kingdom) James Winslow R | 10 | 10 | 5 | 17 | | | | | | | | | | | 83 |
| 20 | (Mexico) Juan Pablo Garcia R | 12 | 8 | 15 | 16 | | | | | | | | | | | 71 |
| 21 | (United States) Daniel Herrington | | | | | | | 12 | 9 | 7 | | | | | | 66 |
| 22 | (United States) Jacob Wilson R | | | | | | | | | | | | | 9 | 5 | 52 |
| 23 | (United States) Chase Austin R | | | | 9 | | 10 | | | | | | | | | 42 |
| 24 | (Canada) Stefan Rzadzinski R | | | | | | | | 10 | 13 | | | | | | 37 |
| 25 | (Canada) Tyler Dueck R | | | | | | | | 16 | 10 | | | | | | 34 |
| 26 | (Canada) Daniel Morad R | | | | | | | | 15 | 11 | | | | | | 34 |
| 27 | (Estonia) Tõnis Kasemets R | | | | | | | | | | | | 8 | | | 24 |
| 28 | (United States) Joel Miller R | 13 | | | | | | | | | | | | | | 17 |
| 29 | (United States) Willy T. Ribbs | | | | | | | | | | | | 13 | | | 17 |
| 30 | (United States) Ryan Phinny R | | | 16 | | | | | | | | | | | | 14 |
| | (Canada) Eric Jensen R | | | | | | | DNQ | | | | | | | | 0 |
| Pos | Driver | STP (United States) | BAR (United States) | LBH (United States) | INDY (United States) | MIL (United States) | IOW (United States) | TOR (Canada) | R1 | R2 | TRO (Canada) | LOU (United States) | BAL (United States) | KTY (United States) | LSV (United States) | Pts |
| Pos | Driver | STP (United States) | BAR (United States) | LBH (United States) | INDY (United States) | MIL (United States) | IOW (United States) | TOR (Canada) | EDM (Canada) | | TRO (Canada) | LOU (United States) | BAL (United States) | KTY (United States) | LSV (United States) | Pts |

| Color | Result |
|---|---|
| Gold | Winner |
| Silver | 2nd place |
| Bronze | 3rd place |
| Green | 4th & 5th place |
| Light Blue | 6th–10th place |
| Dark Blue | Finished (Outside Top 10) |
| Purple | Did not finish |
| Red | Did not qualify (DNQ) |
| Brown | Withdrawn (Wth) |
| Black | Disqualified (DSQ) |
| White | Did not start (DNS) |
| Blank | Did not participate (DNP) |
| Blank | Not competing |

**In-line notation**
| **Bold** | Pole position (1 point) |
| Italics | Ran fastest race lap |
| * | Led most race laps (2 points) |
| ^{1} | Qualifying cancelled no bonus point awarded |
Rookie of the Year
Rookie

| Position | 1 | 2 | 3 | 4 | 5 | 6 | 7 | 8 | 9 | 10 | 11 | 12 | 13 | 14 | 15 | 16 | 17 | 18 | 19 | 20 | 21 | 22 | 23 | 24 | 25 | 26 | 27 | 28 | 29 | 30 | 31 | 32 | 33 |
|---|---|---|---|---|---|---|---|---|---|---|---|---|---|---|---|---|---|---|---|---|---|---|---|---|---|---|---|---|---|---|---|---|---|
| Points | 50 | 40 | 35 | 32 | 30 | 28 | 26 | 24 | 22 | 20 | 19 | 18 | 17 | 16 | 15 | 14 | 13 | 12 | 12 | 12 | 12 | 12 | 12 | 12 | 10 | 10 | 10 | 10 | 10 | 10 | 10 | 10 | 10 |

- Ties in points broken by number of wins, or best finishes.
