= Suzane Carvalho =

Brazilian actress

Suzane Carvalho (b. Rio de Janeiro, 26 December 1963) is a Brazilian racing driver and former actress. In 1992 she won the Formula 3 Sudamericana Class B Championship and became the first and only woman to ever win a Formula Three Championship. After this, she joined The Guinness Book of World Records.
