= 2010 Formula 3 Sudamericana season =

2010 Formula 3 Sudamericana

Seasons
- ← 2009 2011 →

The 2010 Formula 3 Sudamericana season was the 24th Formula 3 Sudamericana season. It began on 16 May 2010, at Autódromo Internacional Nelson Piquet in Brasília and ended on 7 November in Interlagos.

After 508 days, the driver Bruno Andrade of Cesario team was declared champion of the Formula Three Sudamericana in 2010, official result was decided in court on 30 March 2012 in Rio de Janeiro. Yann Cunha, was disqualified of the last race, after a collision with Andrade.

Fernando Resende dominated the Sudamericana Light class, winning 14 of the season's 24 races en route to a championship-winning margin of 114 points. Resende avenged main class defeat for Cesário Fórmula, and himself took an overall podium in Caruaru when only two of the six main class starters finished the race. Resende's team-mate Ronaldo Freitas finished as runner-up, taking five class victories and two overall podiums. Third in class was Duarte Ferreira, who started the season with Dragão Motorsport before joining Cesário Fórmula at round three, and took the other five class victories along with a trio of overall third places at Velopark.

== Drivers and teams ==
- All cars are powered by Berta engines, and will run on Pirelli tyres. All teams were Brazilian-registered.

Team	No	Driver	Chassis	Rounds
Class A
Cesário Fórmula	1	(Brazil) Bruno Andrade	Dallara F309	All
Cesário Fórmula	2	(Brazil) Fabiano Machado	Dallara F309	5–9
Cesário Fórmula	2	(Brazil) Lucas Foresti	Dallara F309	1
Cesário Fórmula	3	(Brazil) Lucas Foresti	Dallara F309	7, 9
PropCar Racing	6	(Brazil) Guilherme Camilo	Dallara F309	1
PropCar Racing	8	(Brazil) Nilton Molina	Dallara F309	1–4
Kemba Racing/G-Force	9	(Brazil) Leonardo de Souza	Dallara F309	1–5, 8–9
Dragão Motorsport	11	(Brazil) Luiz Boesel	Dallara F309	All
Dragão Motorsport	29	(Brazil) Mateus Laba	Dallara F309	1–5, 8–9
Bassan Motorsport	14	(Brazil) Aldo Piedade, Jr.	Dallara F309	1
Bassan Motorsport	14	(Brazil) Nilton Molina	Dallara F309	5
Bassan Motorsport	14	(Brazil) Víctor Guerin	Dallara F309	9
Bassan Motorsport	15	(Brazil) Yann Cunha	Dallara F309	All
Razia Sports	17	(Brazil) Rodolpho Santos	Dallara F309	1
Hitech Racing Brazil	27	(Brazil) Pietro Fantin	Dallara F309	4–5, 8
Hitech Racing Brazil	28	(Brazil) Guilherme Silva	Dallara F309	9
Class B
Cesário Fórmula Jr.	31	(Brazil) Fernando Resende	Dallara F301	All
Cesário Fórmula Jr.	32	(Brazil) Ronaldo Freitas	Dallara F301	All
Cesário Fórmula Jr.	33	(Angola) Duarte Ferreira	Dallara F301	3–8
Baumer Racing	36	(Brazil) Lucílio Baumer	Dallara F301	5
Dragão Motorsport	41	(Angola) Duarte Ferreira	Dallara F301	1–2
Dragão Motorsport	47	(Colombia) Francisco Díaz	Dallara F301	All
Kemba Racing/G-Force	41	(Brazil) Daniel Politzer	Dallara F301	8–9
Kemba Racing/G-Force	50	(Argentina) Maximiliano Baungartner	Dallara F301	6
Capital Motorsport	56	(Brazil) Alberto Cattucci	Dallara F301	1
Capital Motorsport	56	(Brazil) Jean Spolaor	Dallara F301	2–4
PropCar Racing	81	(Brazil) Daniel Politzer	Dallara F301	1–2, 7
PropCar Racing	81	(Brazil) Guilherme Lago	Dallara F301	8–9

== Race calendar and results ==
Round		Location	Circuit	Date	Pole position	Fastest lap	Winning driver	Supporting
1	R1	Brasília, Brazil	Autódromo Internacional Nelson Piquet	15 May	(Brazil) Bruno Andrade	(Brazil) Bruno Andrade	(Brazil) Bruno Andrade	Stand-alone event
1	R2	Brasília, Brazil	Autódromo Internacional Nelson Piquet	16 May		(Brazil) Leonardo de Souza	(Brazil) Lucas Foresti	Stand-alone event
1	R3	Brasília, Brazil	Autódromo Internacional Nelson Piquet	16 May	(Brazil) Bruno Andrade	(Brazil) Lucas Foresti	(Brazil) Lucas Foresti	Stand-alone event
2	R1	Caruaru, Brazil	Autódromo Internacional Ayrton Senna	29 May	(Brazil) Bruno Andrade	(Brazil) Bruno Andrade	(Brazil) Bruno Andrade	Stand-alone event
2	R2	Caruaru, Brazil	Autódromo Internacional Ayrton Senna	29 May		(Brazil) Bruno Andrade	(Brazil) Bruno Andrade	Stand-alone event
2	R3	Caruaru, Brazil	Autódromo Internacional Ayrton Senna	30 May	(Brazil) Bruno Andrade	(Brazil) Bruno Andrade	(Brazil) Bruno Andrade	Stand-alone event
3	R1	Campo Grande, Brazil	Autódromo Internacional Orlando Moura	17 July	(Brazil) Yann Cunha	(Brazil) Yann Cunha	(Brazil) Yann Cunha	Stand-alone event
3	R2	Campo Grande, Brazil	Autódromo Internacional Orlando Moura	17 July		(Brazil) Yann Cunha	(Brazil) Luiz Boesel	Stand-alone event
3	R3	Campo Grande, Brazil	Autódromo Internacional Orlando Moura	18 July	(Brazil) Yann Cunha	(Brazil) Bruno Andrade	(Brazil) Yann Cunha	Stand-alone event
4	R1	Nova Santa Rita, Brazil	Velopark	31 July	(Brazil) Pietro Fantin	(Brazil) Pietro Fantin	(Brazil) Luiz Boesel	Stand-alone event
4	R2	Nova Santa Rita, Brazil	Velopark	31 July		(Brazil) Pietro Fantin	(Brazil) Pietro Fantin	Stand-alone event
4	R3	Nova Santa Rita, Brazil	Velopark	1 August	(Brazil) Pietro Fantin	(Brazil) Pietro Fantin	(Brazil) Pietro Fantin	Stand-alone event
5	R1	Pinhais, Brazil	Autódromo Internacional de Curitiba	28 August	(Brazil) Bruno Andrade	(Brazil) Bruno Andrade	(Brazil) Nilton Molina	Stand-alone event
5	R2	Pinhais, Brazil	Autódromo Internacional de Curitiba	28 August		(Brazil) Pietro Fantin	(Brazil) Pietro Fantin	Stand-alone event
5	R3	Pinhais, Brazil	Autódromo Internacional de Curitiba	29 August	(Brazil) Bruno Andrade	(Brazil) Bruno Andrade	(Brazil) Bruno Andrade	Stand-alone event
6	R1	Santa Fe, Argentina	Circuito do Rúa Santa Fé	11 September	(Brazil) Yann Cunha	(Brazil) Yann Cunha	(Brazil) Yann Cunha	TC 2000 Championship
6	R2	Santa Fe, Argentina	Circuito do Rúa Santa Fé	12 September	(Brazil) Yann Cunha	(Brazil) Luiz Boesel	(Brazil) Fabiano Machado	TC 2000 Championship
7	R1	Piriápolis, Uruguay	Piriápolis Street Circuit	2 October	(Brazil) Yann Cunha	(Brazil) Fabiano Machado	(Brazil) Yann Cunha	Gran Premio de Piriápolis
7	R2	Piriápolis, Uruguay	Piriápolis Street Circuit	3 October	(Brazil) Fabiano Machado	(Brazil) Fabiano Machado	(Brazil) Fabiano Machado	Gran Premio de Piriápolis
8	R1	Londrina, Brazil	Autódromo Internacional Londrina	16 October	(Brazil) Yann Cunha	(Brazil) Yann Cunha	(Brazil) Yann Cunha	Stand-alone event
8	R2	Londrina, Brazil	Autódromo Internacional Londrina	17 October		(Brazil) Pietro Fantin	(Brazil) Leonardo de Souza	Stand-alone event
8	R3	Londrina, Brazil	Autódromo Internacional Londrina	17 October	(Brazil) Yann Cunha	(Brazil) Pietro Fantin	(Brazil) Fabiano Machado	Stand-alone event
9	R1	São Paulo, Brazil	Autódromo José Carlos Pace	6 November	(Brazil) Fabiano Machado	(Brazil) Lucas Foresti	(Brazil) Lucas Foresti	2010 Brazilian Grand Prix
9	R2	São Paulo, Brazil	Autódromo José Carlos Pace	7 November	(Brazil) Fabiano Machado	(Brazil) Fabiano Machado	(Brazil) Fabiano Machado	2010 Brazilian Grand Prix

== Championship Standings ==
- Points are awarded as follows:

1	2	3	4	5	6	7	8	9	10
25	18	15	12	10	8	6	4	2	1

Pos	Driver	BRA (Brazil)			CAR (Brazil)			CAM (Brazil)			VEL (Brazil)			CUR (Brazil)			SAN (Argentina)		PIR (Uruguay)		LON (Brazil)			INT (Brazil)		Pts
Class A
1	(Brazil) Bruno Andrade	**1**	Ret	**6**	**1**	1	**1**	3	2	2	7	Ret	2	**8**	2	**1**	Ret	3	2	3	2	9	5	2	4	361
2	(Brazil) Yann Cunha	3	DSQ	3	2	5	9	**1**	3	**1**	2	2	7	Ret	4	3	**1**	**Ret**	**1**	2	**1**	6	**4**	3	DSQ	351
3	(Brazil) Luiz Boesel	11	3	4	5	Ret	2	4	1	3	1	6	Ret	9	3	4	2	2	4	4	3	2	2	7	Ret	298
4	(Brazil) Fabiano Machado													2	6	6	3	1	3	**1**	Ret	Ret	1	**5**	**1**	174
5	(Brazil) Leonardo de Souza	6	2	8	3	Ret	4	5	9	5	Ret	Ret	8	6	Ret	5					4	1	3	8	7	173
6	(Brazil) Nilton Molina	5	4	2	4	Ret	3	2	4	4	Ret	Ret	Ret	1	5	7										150
7	(Brazil) Mateus Laba	7	10	7	6	Ret	Ret	10	8	10	Ret	4	4	Ret	8	12					7	7	7	11	6	130
8	(Brazil) Lucas Foresti	2	1	1															9	8				1	3	128
9	(Brazil) Pietro Fantin										**Ret**	1	**1**	3	1	2					Ret	Ret	Ret			108
10	(Brazil) Víctor Guerin																							4	2	30
11	(Brazil) Aldo Piedade, Jr.	9	5	5																						24
12	(Brazil) Rodolpho Santos	4	6	Ret																						22
13	(Brazil) Guilherme Silva																							5	12	14
	(Brazil) Guilherme Camilo	DNS	DNS	DNS																						0
Class B
1	(Brazil) Fernando Resende	**8**	7	**9**	7	2	5	**8**	5	**6**	4	5	6	**4**	7	**11**	Ret	5	6	9	5	Ret	6	9	5	476
2	(Brazil) Ronaldo Freitas	Ret	Ret	12	**8**	3	**6**	7	6	8	6	Ret	9	5	10	8	**5**	**4**	**5**	**5**	**8**	3	**8**	**10**	**9**	362
3	(Angola) Duarte Ferreira	12	9	14	10	Ret	10	6	7	7	**3**	3	**3**	7	11	9	4	Ret	Ret	DNS	6	5	12			306
4	(Colombia) Francisco Díaz	10	12	11	9	4	Ret	9	DNS	9	5	Ret	5	10	9	10	Ret	6	8	6	Ret	4	8	12	8	289
5	(Brazil) Daniel Politzer	Ret	11	Ret	11	DNS	7												7	7	Ret	8	11	13	11	111
6	(Brazil) Jean Spolaor				Ret	6	8	11	10	11	DNS	DNS	DNS													56
7	(Brazil) Alberto Cattucci	Ret	8	8																						36
8	(Brazil) Guilherme Lago																				Ret	Ret	10	Ret	10	24
	(Brazil) Lucílio Baumer													DNS	DNS	DNS										0
	(Argentina) Maximiliano Baungartner																DNS	DNS								0
Pos	Driver	BRA (Brazil)			CAR (Brazil)			CAM (Brazil)			VEL (Brazil)			CUR (Brazil)			SAN (Argentina)		PIR (Uruguay)		LON (Brazil)			INT (Brazil)		Pts

Colour	Result
Gold	Winner
Silver	Second place
Bronze	Third place
Green	Points classification
Blue	Non-points classification
Blue	Non-classified finish (NC)
Purple	Retired, not classified (Ret)
Red	Did not qualify (DNQ)
Red	Did not pre-qualify (DNPQ)
Black	Disqualified (DSQ)
White	Did not start (DNS)
White	Withdrew (WD)
White	Race cancelled (C)
Blank	Did not practice (DNP)
Blank	Did not arrive (DNA)
Blank	Excluded (EX)

**Bold** – Pole
Italics – Fastest Lap
