= Eduardo Azevedo =

Brazilian racing driver

Eduardo Azevedo (born September 21, 1982) is a race car driver. He was the 2001 Brazilian Formula Junior champion and the 2002 South American Formula Three Class-B champion. He raced in Brazilian Formula Renault in 2003.
