= Fabiano Machado =

Brazilian professional racing driver (born 1986)

- Nationality: (Brazil) Brazilian
- Born: 28 May 1986 (age 40)

Previous series
- 2012 2010–11: GP3 Series; Formula 3 Sudamericana

Championship titles
- 2011: Formula Three Sudamericana

Fabiano Machado (born 28 May 1986) is a Brazilian former professional racing driver.

== Career ==
=== Karting ===
Machado began karting in 2003 and raced primarily in his native Brazil for the majority of his career.

=== Formula Three Sudamericana ===
Machado graduated to single-seaters, competing in the local Formula Three Sudamericana championship with Cesário Fórmula. He won four races and amassed another three podiums, finishing fourth in the standings. Machado remained with Cesário Fórmula into 2011, winning 17 of the season's 25 races to comfortably win the championship title.

=== GP3 Series ===
In 2012, Machado made his début in the GP3 Series with Marussia Manor Racing.

== Racing record ==
=== Career summary ===
Season	Series	Team	Races	Wins	Poles	F/Laps	Podiums	Points	Position
2010	Formula 3 Sudamericana	Cesário Fórmula	12	4	3	2	7	174	4th
2011	Formula 3 Brazil Open	Cesário Fórmula	1	0	0	0	0	N/A	4th
2011	Formula 3 Sudamericana	Cesário Fórmula	25	17	7	9	22	536	**1st**
2012	Formula 3 Brazil Open	Cesário Fórmula	1	0	0	0	0	N/A	NC
2012	GP3 Series	Marussia Manor Racing	14	0	0	0	0	0	21st

=== Complete GP3 Series results ===
(key) (Races in bold indicate pole position) (Races in italics indicate fastest lap)

Year	Entrant	1	2	3	4	5	6	7	8	9	10	11	12	13	14	15	16	DC	Points
2012	Marussia Manor Racing	CAT; FEA; 16	CAT; SPR; Ret	MON; FEA; 15	MON; SPR; 17	VAL; FEA; Ret	VAL; SPR; 19	SIL; FEA; 19	SIL; SPR; 9	HOC; FEA; Ret	HOC; SPR; Ret	HUN; FEA; DNS	HUN; SPR; DNS	SPA; FEA; 25	SPA; SPR; 21	MNZ; FEA; Ret	MNZ; SPR; 16	21st	0

Sporting positions
Preceded by Bruno Andrade	Formula 3 Sudamericana Champion; 2011	Succeeded by Fernando Resende
