= Formula 3 Sudamericana =

Former Single-Seater Racing Championship

- Category: Single seaters
- Country: Brazil
- Inaugural season: 1987
- Folded: 2013
- Constructors: Dallara
- Engine suppliers: Berta
- Tyre suppliers: Pirelli
- Last Drivers' champion: (Brazil) Felipe Guimarães
- Last Teams' champion: (United Kingdom) Hitech Racing
- Official website: www.f3sudam.com.br

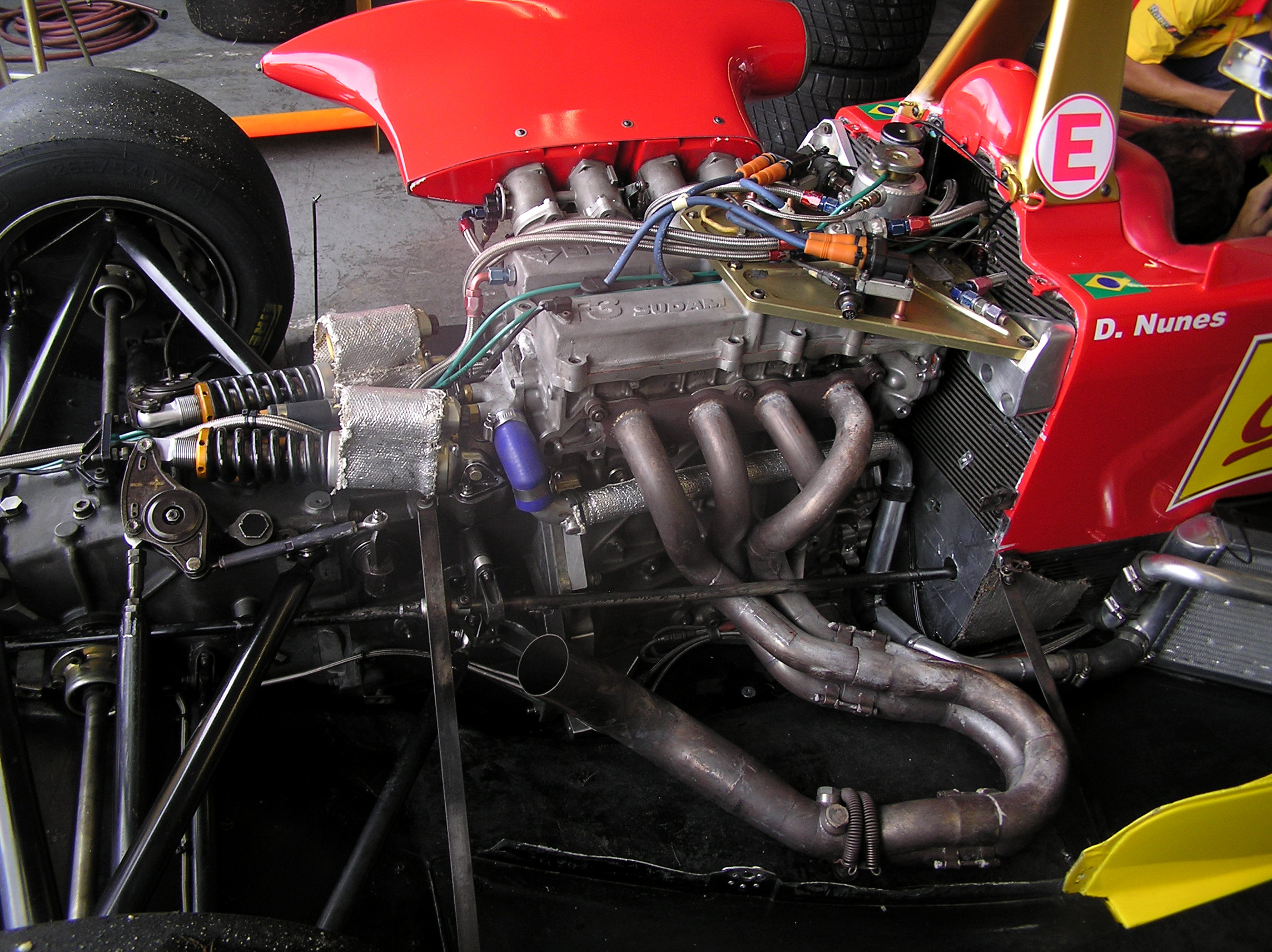
A Berta engine

Fórmula 3 Sudamericana was a South American Formula Three championship. It was inaugurated in 1987 and primarily held races in Brazil and Argentina, with a small number of events held in other countries across the continent. Its most notable graduates include former Formula One drivers Nelson Piquet Jr., Ricardo Zonta and Christian Fittipaldi, four-time Indianapolis 500 winner Hélio Castroneves, and Champ Car champion and former F1 driver Cristiano da Matta. The series was replaced for 2014 by the Brazilian Formula Three Championship, which focuses on Brazilian circuits and drivers.

== Background ==
Prior to the creation in 1987 of a regional Formula Three championship in South America, the Codasur championship was held annually between 1983 and 1986. This series utilised local chassis or Formula Three chassis with Renault or Volkswagen 1500–1600cc engines. Each of the four drivers' championship titles went to Guillermo Maldonado of Argentina. Maldonado, like many of his contemporaries, also functioned as a team owner.

The Codasur Championship's team owners and the governing bodies of national motorsport in the region began collectively to discuss its replacement with a current European or worldwide formula. They wanted a formula that would provide young South American drivers with experience that would be relevant when, or if, they had the opportunity to further their career internationally. The long-established Formula Three was the obvious choice.

Petrobras was announced as the official sponsor of the 2010 season of Formula 3 South America. The agreement, made possible through the Law for Encouragement of Sport – Sports Ministry – was worth $3 million and valid for a period of 12 months.

The project also includes the acquisition of naming rights category, which from this year has been renamed Formula 3 Sudamericana Petrobras. The Brazilian oil company is also the official supplier of fuel and lubricant for all cars in Formula 3. Even under the contract are the development and implementation of events, promotions, and marketing.

== Equipment ==
However, despite the ready availability of second-hand F3 chassis and engines, the organisers of the new championship commissioned their own chassis to F3 specification, which was built in Argentina by veteran TC 2000 Championship driver and engineer Oreste Berta's eponymous company. The Berta Mk3 was used exclusively during 1987, until the championship was opened up to other suppliers in the following year. From 1988 until the mid-1990s, chassis from Reynard, Ralt, TOM's and Dallara were in common use, but at that point, Dallara's increasing performance advantage had the same effect in South America as it had in Europe, and it became the de facto choice.

Since 2005, the series organisers have sought to keep budget requirements under stricter control by using a "control specification" engine, which is produced by Berta. It has considerably reduced running budgets since its introduction, not least because the teams are permitted to service the engines themselves. The Berta engine is used by all Class A entrants, but competitors in Class B, or Light, are still using other customer engines such as Mugen-Honda in a significantly older chassis. Class A entrants used the five-year-old Dallara F301 in 2006, while Light entrants used the F394 from 1994. F3 chassis are designed to a three-year lifecycle, with only minor annual updates.

== Venues ==
During this early era, the championship was held in Argentina, Brazil, Chile and Uruguay. Between 2002 and 2008, the series has limited itself to events in Brazil and Argentina. The Grand Prix of Piriápolis returned to the series in 2009. Local economic issues have tended to limit the potential for the maintenance and development of motor racing venues, which means that only the most popular circuits can afford to support the championship.

== Scoring system ==
- The scoring system for 2010 replicates the new system introduced into Formula One:

Position	1st	2nd	3rd	4th	5th	6th	7th	8th	9th	10th
Points	25	18	15	12	10	8	6	4	2	1

== Teams and drivers ==
Economics also plays a part in the demography of the competitors. Since its inception, F3 Sudamericana has been primarily the domain of Brazilian and Argentine drivers and teams, but that imbalance has increased in the 2000s, with very few drivers from countries other than Brazil. In 2006, just a small number of Argentine drivers competed in the series, and only in events on home soil.

In recognition of this shortcoming, the series' organisers and race promoters worked to make it an attractive and suitable proposition for drivers from the smaller South American nations. In addition to cost reductions, steps have been taken to improve its public popularity, and hence, the marketing potential. In 2007, F3 Sudamericana shared its Brazilian venues with that country's Trofeo Maserati championship.

In spite of its economic limitations, and its relative geographical remoteness from the major centres of motorsport, F3 Sudamericana has nonetheless produced a number of recognised and notable drivers who have since established themselves in Europe and the United States. In addition to Castroneves and da Matta, the series' alumni include other Champ Car drivers past and present, such as Christian Fittipaldi (the nephew of Emerson) and Bruno Junqueira. Competing in the GP2 championship are 2003 runner-up Lucas di Grassi and 2004 champion Alexandre Sarnes Negrão.

== Champions ==
Season	Driver	Team	Chassis/engine	Secondary class
1987	(Brazil) Leonel Friedrich	(Argentina) INI Competición	Berta-Volkswagen	
1988	(Argentina) Juan Carlos Giacchino	(Argentina) Sommi Competición	Dallara-Alfa Romeo	
1989	(Argentina) Gabriel Furlán	(Argentina) INI Competición	Dallara-Alfa Romeo	
1990	(Brazil) Christian Fittipaldi	(Brazil) Fittipaldi Competicion	Reynard-Alfa Romeo	
1991	(Brazil) Affonso Giaffone	(Argentina) INI Competición	Ralt-Volkswagen	
1992	(Brazil) Marcos Gueiros	(Brazil) Cesário Fórmula	Ralt-Mugen-Honda	(Brazil) Suzane Carvalho
1993	(Argentina) Fernando Croceri	(Brazil) Cesário Fórmula	Ralt-Mugen-Honda	(Brazil) Milton Sperafico
1994	(Argentina) Gabriel Furlán	(Argentina) GF Motorsport	Dallara-Fiat	
1995	(Brazil) Ricardo Zonta	(Brazil) Cesário Fórmula	Dallara-Mugen-Honda	(Argentina) Emiliano Spataro
1996	(Argentina) Gabriel Furlán	(Argentina) GF Motorsport	Dallara-Fiat	(Argentina) Anibal Zaniratto
1997	(Brazil) Bruno Junqueira	(Brazil) PropCar Racing	Dallara-Opel	(Argentina) Diego Chiozzi
1998	(Argentina) Gabriel Furlán	(Argentina) GF Motorsport	Dallara-HKS-Mitsubishi	(Chile) Ramón Ibarra
1999	(Brazil) Hoover Orsi	(Brazil) Césario Fórmula	Dallara-Mugen-Honda	(Brazil) João Paulo de Oliveira
2000	(Brazil) Vítor Meira	(Brazil) Amir Nasr Racing	Dallara-Mugen-Honda	(Uruguay) Martín Cánepa
2001	(Brazil) Juliano Moro	(Brazil) Amir Nasr Racing	Dallara-Mugen-Honda	(Brazil) Daniel Scandian
2002	(Brazil) Nelson Piquet Jr.	(Brazil) Piquet Sports	Dallara-Mugen-Honda	(Brazil) Eduardo Azevedo
2003	(Brazil) Danilo Dirani	(Brazil) Césario Fórmula	Dallara-Mugen-Honda	(Brazil) Rodrigo Ribeiro
2004	(Brazil) Alexandre Negrão	(Brazil) Piquet Sports	Dallara-Mugen-Honda/Berta	(Brazil) Marcos Guerra
2005	(Brazil) Alberto Valerio	(Brazil) Césario Fórmula	Dallara-Berta	(Brazil) Paulo José Meyer
2006	(Brazil) Luiz Razia	(Brazil) Dragão Motorsport	Dallara-Berta	(Brazil) Caio Costa
2007	(Brazil) Clemente de Faria Jr.	(Brazil) Césario Fórmula	Dallara-Berta	
2008	(Brazil) Nelson Merlo	(Brazil) Bassani Racing	Dallara-Berta	
2009	(Brazil) Leonardo Cordeiro	(Brazil) Cesário Fórmula	Dallara-Berta	(Brazil) Henrique Martins
2010	(Brazil) Bruno Andrade	(Brazil) Cesário Fórmula	Dallara-Berta	(Brazil) Fernando Resende
2011	(Brazil) Fabiano Machado	(Brazil) Cesário Fórmula	Dallara-Berta	(Brazil) Bruno Bonifácio
2012	(Brazil) Fernando Resende	(Brazil) Cesário Fórmula	Dallara-Berta	(Brazil) Higor Hoffman
2013	(Brazil) Felipe Guimarães	(United Kingdom) Hitech Racing	Dallara-Berta	(Argentina) Bruno Etman

== See also ==
- Formula 3 Sudamericana drivers
- Brazilian Formula Three Championship
