= 2012 F2000 Championship Series =

2012 F2000 Championship season

Seasons
- ← 2011 2013 →

The 2012 F2000 Championship Series season marked the seventh season of competition in the series. It consisted of 14 rounds (seven double-race weekends), beginning April 12 at Virginia International Raceway and concluding October 14 at Watkins Glen International.

Venezuelan Roberto La Rocca of HP-Tech won 11 of the 14 races and finished on the podium in 13 of the 14. American Wyatt Gooden, who got his start through winning online video racing tournaments, finished second in points with two wins. American Niki Coello won one race and finished third. Kevin Kopp finished fourth in points and Tim Minor finished fifth, while claiming his second consecutive and third overall Masters Championship title.

== Race calendar and results ==
Round	Circuit	Location	Date	Pole position	Fastest lap	Winning driver	Winning team
1	Virginia International Raceway	(United States) Alton, Virginia	April 12–15	(Venezuela) Roberto La Rocca	(Venezuela) Roberto La Rocca	(Venezuela) Roberto La Rocca	(Venezuela) HP-Tech
2	Virginia International Raceway	(United States) Alton, Virginia	April 12–15	(Venezuela) Roberto La Rocca	(Venezuela) Roberto La Rocca	(Venezuela) Roberto La Rocca	(Venezuela) HP-Tech
3	Road Atlanta	(United States) Braselton, Georgia	May 10–12	(United States) Wyatt Gooden	(Venezuela) Roberto La Rocca	(Venezuela) Roberto La Rocca	(Venezuela) HP-Tech
4	Road Atlanta	(United States) Braselton, Georgia	May 10–12	(Venezuela) Roberto La Rocca	(Venezuela) Roberto La Rocca	(Venezuela) Roberto La Rocca	(Venezuela) HP-Tech
5	Lime Rock Park	(United States) Lakeville, Connecticut	May 25–26	(Venezuela) Roberto La Rocca	(Venezuela) Roberto La Rocca	(United States) Wyatt Gooden	(United States) Quantum Mechanics Racing Services
6	Lime Rock Park	(United States) Lakeville, Connecticut	May 25–26	(Venezuela) Roberto La Rocca	(Venezuela) Roberto La Rocca	(Venezuela) Roberto La Rocca	(Venezuela) HP-Tech
7	New Jersey Motorsports Park	(United States) Millville, New Jersey	June 28 – July 1	(Venezuela) Roberto La Rocca	(Venezuela) Roberto La Rocca	(Venezuela) Roberto La Rocca	(Venezuela) HP-Tech
8	New Jersey Motorsports Park	(United States) Millville, New Jersey	June 28 – July 1	(Venezuela) Roberto La Rocca	(Venezuela) Roberto La Rocca	(Venezuela) Roberto La Rocca	(Venezuela) HP-Tech
9	Mid-Ohio Sports Car Course	(United States) Lexington, Ohio	July 26–29	(Venezuela) Roberto La Rocca	(Venezuela) Roberto La Rocca	(Venezuela) Roberto La Rocca	(Venezuela) HP-Tech
10	Mid-Ohio Sports Car Course	(United States) Lexington, Ohio	July 26–29	(Venezuela) Roberto La Rocca	(United States) Wyatt Gooden	(United States) Wyatt Gooden	(United States) Quantum Mechanics Racing Services
11	Summit Point Motorsports Park	(United States) Summit Point, West Virginia	August 24–26	(United States) Wyatt Gooden	(Venezuela) Roberto La Rocca	(Venezuela) Roberto La Rocca	(Venezuela) HP-Tech
12	Summit Point Motorsports Park	(United States) Summit Point, West Virginia	August 24–26	(Venezuela) Roberto La Rocca	(United States) Chris Livengood	(United States) Niki Coello	(United States) Coello Racing
13	Watkins Glen International	(United States) Watkins Glen, New York	October 12–14	(Venezuela) Roberto La Rocca	(Venezuela) Roberto La Rocca	(Venezuela) Roberto La Rocca	(Venezuela) HP-Tech
14	Watkins Glen International	(United States) Watkins Glen, New York	October 12–14	(Venezuela) Roberto La Rocca	(Venezuela) Roberto La Rocca	(Venezuela) Roberto La Rocca	(Venezuela) HP-Tech

== Championship standings ==
Pos	Driver	VIR		ATL		LRP		NJ		MOH		SUM		WGL		Points
Drivers' championship
1	(Venezuela) Roberto La Rocca	**1**	**1**^{1}	1	**1**	**3**	**1**	**1**	**1**	**1**	**28**	1	**3**	**1**	**1**	626
2	(United States) Wyatt Gooden	32	3	**2**	3	1	19	5	2	3	1	**2**	2	3	2	497
3	(United States) Niki Coello	3	2	4	5	2	20	21	3	14	3	5	1	2	4	430
4	(United States) Kevin Kopp	4	4	12	7	13	5	3	4	4	19	3	5	9	6	366
5	(United States) Tim Minor **(M)**	6	23	5	4	6	2	2	8	9	5	7	20			317
6	(United States) Tim Paul	8	5	6	6	8	6	6	6	5	29	11	19	14	12	306
7	(United States) Chris Livengood	14	30	DSQ	10	5	3	8	9	7	4	8	4	32	9	296
8	(United States) Zach Craigo	18	6	9	8			4	5	12	15	4	16	6	5	282
9	(United States) Kyle Connery	7	31	3	2	23	28			31	2	6	17	4	8	250
10	(United States) Dave Weitzenhof **(M)**	5	7	8	9			12	20	10	13	13	DNS	23	15	189
11	(United States) Tom Fatur **(M)**	12	9			4	4			8	7			12	29	178
12	(United States) John Brumder	26	20	18	17	11	11	11	13	32	23	23	7	15	17	148
13	(United States) Robert Wright **(M)**	33	33	24	24	9	8	20	12	15	14	17	18	13	14	143
14	(United States) Bill Jordan **(M)**	20	14	15	15					11	8	19	8	17	30	127
15	(Venezuela) Cesar LaPoint									6	6	15	6	DNS	7	125
16	(Canada) Dean Baker **(M)**	13	15			26	10			13	12			8	16	115
17	(Venezuela) José Montiel	19	16	26	14	12	22	14	19	18	21	18	11	29	32	106
17	(United States) Peter Gonzalez **(M)**	11	24	17	16	DNS	17			21	11	21	9	33	21	106
19	(United States) Nick Palacio	10	11					9	11			10	DNS			103
20	(United States) Craig Clawson **(M)**	27	17			10	9			29	20	16	14	22	22	92
21	(United States) Charles Finelli **(M)**	17	12	22	23	16	7					22	DNS	20	35	81
22	(Brazil) Fabio Orsolon	2	8	DNS	25											68
22	(United States) Rob Nicholas **(M)**													5	3	68
24	(United States) Jeff McCusker **(M)**	29	19			24	13	19	21			20	10	27	33	62
25	(United States) Mark Defer **(M)**	16	13	10	13											61
26	(United States) Paul Alspach							17	7	30	10					58
27	(United States) Dan Denison **(M)**	25	22	21	20					17	18	24	15	19	24	55
27	(United States) Doug Rocco					18	15	13	15	33	25			25	19	55
29	(Barbados) Brent Gilkes **(M)**	9	10	19	26											52
30	(Brazil) Danyel Torres											9	12	16	31	51
31	(United States) Gerry Kraut **(M)**			7	11											46
31	(United States) John LaRue **(M)**	28	29	25						2	32					46
33	(United States) Chris Monteleone					17	16	16	14					DNS	DNS	42
33	(Jamaica) Collin Daley							10	10							42
33	(Brazil) Gustavo Rizzo											12	13	24	18	42
33	(Canada) Sergio Pasian													10	10	42
38	(United States) Keith McCrone											14	DNS	18	11	40
39	(United States) Rob Alaer	DNS	21							16	9					38
39	(United States) Eric Presbrey			20	19	14	21			24	22			DNS	25	38
41	(United States) Jason Rabe							7	16							37
42	(United States) Thomas Schweitz **(M)**	22	DNS	13	12									DNS	DNS	36
42	(Canada) Aaron Pettipas	23	25			DNS	12			22	16					36
44	(United States) Shaun Miller	21	18			15	24			19	31					33
45	(Australia) Nathan Morcom	15	32	15	DNS											31
46	(United States) Jonathan Scarallo					7	23									30
47	(United States) Brendan Puderbach	30	27	23	21	22	14								36	27
47	(United States) Tom Drake **(M)**					21	18	18	17	28	24			31	28	27
49	(United States) Jose Gerardo **(M)**	31	26	14	22											19
49	(United States) Matthew Inge													11	DNS	19
51	(United States) Steve Coates			16	18											18
52	(United States) Vaughn Horvath	24	28							23	17			26	26	17
53	(United States) Dennis McCarthy					25	DNS	15	18	25	26					15
54	(United States) Jim Hanrahan **(M)**					19	25							28	37	10
55	(United States) Joey Selmants									20	33					7
55	(Canada) Steve Bamford													35	20	7
57	(United States) Fred Bross **(M)**					20	DNS									6
57	(United States) Chris Camadella **(M)**													21	34	6
59	(United States) Matt Machiko													36	23	4
60	(United States) Barry Gilbert									26	27					2
60	(United States) Al Guibord, Sr.									27	30					2
60	(United States) Scott Baroody													34	27	2
63	(United States) Will Haney													30	DNS	1
Pos	Driver	VIR		ATL		LRP		NJ		MOH		SUM		WGL		Points

Color	Result
Gold	Winner
Silver	2nd place
Bronze	3rd place
Green	4th & 5th place
Light Blue	6th–10th place
Dark Blue	Finished (Outside Top 10)
Purple	Did not finish
Red	Did not qualify (DNQ)
Brown	Withdrawn (Wth)
Black	Disqualified (DSQ)
White	Did not start (DNS)
Blank	Did not participate (DNP)
Blank	Not competing

**In-line notation**
**Bold**	Pole position (3 points)
Italics	Ran fastest race lap (2 points)

This list only contains drivers who registered for the championship.
(M) indicates driver is participating in Masters Class for drivers over 40 years of age.

^{1} Roberto La Rocca was penalized 25 points for failing to leave sufficient racing room for a competitor in Round 2.
