= 2011 F2000 Championship Series =

2011 F2000 Championship season

Seasons
- ← 2010 2012 →

The 2011 F2000 Championship Series season was the sixth season of competition in the series, an American professional touring open-wheel racing series using the Formula Ford. It consisted of 14 rounds (seven double-race weekends), beginning April 8 at Virginia International Raceway and concluding October 16 at Watkins Glen International.

Twenty-six-year-old Canadian driver Remy Audette, competing for a family-owned team, won five races and finished on the podium four more times on his way to the championship by an over 100 point margin over his closest challenger, American Chris Livengood who won twice. Twenty-year-old American Kyle Connery won six times, but failed to finish four times and failed to start twice, while Audette finished every race seventh or better. The only other driver to win a race was Australian Nathan Morcom who won the season opener at Virginia International Raceway.

American Tim Minor captured his second Master's Class title for drivers 40 and older. Minor finished on the overall podium six times and finished fourth in the overall championship.

The season finale at Watkins Glen International drew a large 35-car field but at the start of the race Tom Fatur crashed hard into the pit wall separator, forcing the race to be postponed one day due to damage to the wall. Despite the hard impact, Fatur was uninjured.

== Drivers and teams ==
Team	No.	Driver	Chassis	Engine	Notes
(United States) McLaughlin Motorsports	1	(United States) Ethan Ringel	RFR	Zetec	
(United States) Primus Racing	2	(Australia) Nathan Morcom	Van Diemen RF06	Zetec	
(United States) Primus Racing	4	(United States) Jonathan Scarallo	Van Diemen RF01	Zetec	
(United States) Primus Racing	13	(Australia) Steele Guiliana	Van Diemen RF06	Zetec	
(United States) Auriana Racing	3	(United States) Joe Colasacco	Van Diemen RF06	Zetec	
(United States) SMR Motorsports	6	(United States) Timothy Paul	Van Diemen RF02	Zetec	Run in conjunction with GTP Motorsports
(United States) Lap 2 Racing	7	(Barbados) Brent Gilkes	Van Diemen RF03	Zetec	Masters
(United States) Polestar Racing Group	8	(United States) Bill Jordan	Van Diemen	Zetec	Masters
(United States) Polestar Racing Group	42	(United States) Mark Defer	Van Diemen RF06	Zetec	Masters
(United States) Polestar Racing Group	51	(United States) Dan Denison	Van Diemen RF05	Zetec	Masters
(United States) HP-Tech Motorsport	10	(Venezuela) Roberto La Rocca	RFR	Zetec	
(United States) HP-Tech Motorsport	22	(Venezuela) Giancarlo Potolicchio	RFR	Zetec	Skipped Road Atlanta
(United States) HP-Tech Motorsport	22	(Venezuela) Enzo Potolicchio	RFR	Zetec	Road Atlanta only
(United States) Front Range Motorsports	14	(United States) Jose Gerardo	Van Diemen RF00	Pinto	Masters; Road Atlanta only
(United States) Front Range Motorsports	14	(United States) Fred Bross	Van Diemen RF02	Zetec	Masters; Watkins Glen only
(United States) Front Range Motorsports	60	(United States) Mark Felsen	Van Diemen RF02	Zetec	Masters; VIR only
(United States) Front Range Motorsports	60	(United States) Dwight Rider	Van Diemen RF02	Zetec	Masters; Road Atlanta & Watkins Glen only
(Canada) Audette Racing	21	(Canada) Remy Audette	Van Diemen RF08	Zetec	
(United States) Alegra Motorsports	23	(Brazil) Gustavo Rizzo	Van Diemen RF02	Zetec	
(United States) Alegra Motorsports	26	(Venezuela) Angel Benitez	Van Diemen RF03	Zetec	
(United States) Company Motorsports	25	(United States) Jeff McCusker	Van Diemen RF01	Zetec	Masters
(United States) AcceleRace Motorsports	29	(United States) Ardie Greenamyer	Van Diemen RF02	Zetec	
(United States) Fat Boy Racing/John Walko Racing	31	(United States) Brendan Puderbach	RFR	Zetec	Road Atlanta only
(United States) Work Racing/John Walko Racing	37	(United States) Chris Livengood	Van Diemen RF99	Zetec	
(United States) Mountain Lion Motorsports	47	(United States) Chris Moteleone	Van Diemen RF98	Pinto	Watkins Glen only
(United States) Alley Cat Racing	61	(United States) Tom Drake	Van Diemen RF99	Pinto	Masters; Watkins Glen only
(United States) Weitzenhof Racing	67	(United States) Dave Weitzenhof	Citation	Zetec	Masters
(United States) GTP Motorsports	70	(United States) Tom Fatur	Van Diemen RF03	Zetec	Masters
(United States) GTP Motorsports	86	(United States) Jim Hanrahan	Van Diemen	Zetec	Masters
(United States) Afterburner Racing	71	(United States) Niki Coello	RFR	Zetec	
(United States) Afterburner Racing	96	(United States) Brian Tomasi	RFR	Zetec	
(Canada) Kenette Racing	72	(Canada) Francis Kenette	Mygale F2000	Zetec	Masters; VIR only
(United States) Josh Starke Racing	72	(United States) Thomas Schweitz	Piper DF5	Zetec	Masters; Road Atlanta & Watkins Glen
(United States) Ski Motorsports	88	(United States) Tim Minor	Van Diemen RF98	Zetec	Masters
(United States) K-Fast	89	(United States) Rob Nicholas	Van Diemen RF01	Zetec	Masters; VIR only
(United States) ADSA/Wright Racing	90	(United States) Robert Wright	Van Diemen RF01	Zetec	Masters
(United States) ADSA/Wright Racing	94	(United States) Al Guibord, Sr.	Van Diemen RF01	Zetec	VIR only
(United States) CC Motorsport	91	(United States) Kyle Connery	Van Diemen RF06	Zetec	
(United States) CG Racing	97	(United States) Chris Gumprecht	RFR	Zetec	

== Race calendar and results ==
Round	Circuit	Location	Date	Pole position	Fastest lap	Winning driver	Winning team
1	Virginia International Raceway	(United States) Alton, Virginia	April 9	(United States) Kyle Connery	(United States) Tim Minor	(Australia) Nathan Morcom	(United States) Primus Racing
2	Virginia International Raceway	(United States) Alton, Virginia	April 10	(Canada) Remy Audette	(Canada) Remy Audette	(Canada) Remy Audette	(Canada) Audette Racing
3	Road Atlanta	(United States) Braselton, Georgia	May 6	(United States) Jonathan Scarallo	(United States) Kyle Connery	(United States) Kyle Connery	(United States) CC Motorsport
4	Road Atlanta	(United States) Braselton, Georgia	May 7	(United States) Kyle Connery	(United States) Kyle Connery	(United States) Kyle Connery	(United States) CC Motorsport
5	Watkins Glen International	(United States) Watkins Glen, New York	June 4	(United States) Chris Livengood	(United States) Kyle Connery	(Canada) Remy Audette	(Canada) Audette Racing
6	Watkins Glen International	(United States) Watkins Glen, New York	June 5	(United States) Kyle Connery	(Canada) Remy Audette	(Canada) Remy Audette	(Canada) Audette Racing
7	Mid-Ohio Sports Car Course	(United States) Lexington, Ohio	July 1	(United States) Chris Livengood	(United States) Kyle Connery	(United States) Chris Livengood	(United States) Work Racing/John Walko Racing
8	Mid-Ohio Sports Car Course	(United States) Lexington, Ohio	July 2	(United States) Kyle Connery	(United States) Kyle Connery	(United States) Kyle Connery	(United States) CC Motorsport
9	Mosport International Raceway	(Canada) Bowmanville, Ontario	July 22	(Canada) Remy Audette	(United States) Chris Livengood	(United States) Kyle Connery	(United States) CC Motorsport
10	Mosport International Raceway	(Canada) Bowmanville, Ontario	July 23	(United States) Chris Livengood	(Canada) Remy Audette	(Canada) Remy Audette	(Canada) Audette Racing
11	Lime Rock Park	(United States) Lakeville, Connecticut	September 17	(Canada) Remy Audette	(Canada) Remy Audette	(Canada) Remy Audette	(Canada) Audette Racing
12	Lime Rock Park	(United States) Lakeville, Connecticut	September 17	(Canada) Remy Audette	(United States) Chris Livengood	(United States) Chris Livengood	(United States) Work Racing/John Walko Racing
13	Watkins Glen International	(United States) Watkins Glen, New York	October 16	(Canada) Remy Audette	(Canada) Remy Audette	(United States) Kyle Connery	(United States) CC Motorsport
14	Watkins Glen International	(United States) Watkins Glen, New York	October 16	(Canada) Remy Audette	(Canada) Remy Audette	(United States) Kyle Connery	(United States) CC Motorsport

== Championship standings ==
Pos	Driver	VIR		ATL		WG1		MOH		MOS		LRP		WG2		Points
Drivers' championship
1	(Canada) Remy Audette	4	**1**	2	4	1	1	5	7	**3**	1	**1**	**2**	**3**	**3**	601
2	(United States) Chris Livengood	3	10	22	3	**5**	2	**1**	25	2	**2**	20	1	4	7	429
3	(United States) Kyle Connery	**DNS**	2	1	**1**	2	**26**	25	**1**	1	15	23	DNS	1	1	409
4	(United States) Tim Minor **(M)**	16	3	3	2	31	3	7	2	5	16	2	6	2	33	383
5	(Venezuela) Roberto La Rocca	2	5	4	6	30	6	3	4	4	14	19	21	6	4	336
6	(United States) Tim Paul	20	9	12	19	4	28	17	15	8	6	12	3	7	18	251
7	(Venezuela) Angel Benitez	15	4	DNS	10	26	4	15	13	9	4	3	20	33	8	248
8	(Australia) Nathan Morcom	1	8	5	23	DNS	7	8	6			7	7	25	29	246
9	(United States) Craig Clawson **(M)**	8	15			12	9	DNS	20	12	7	4	8	14	12	217
10	(United States) Thomas Schwietz **(M)**			7	12	24	5	13				5	17	8	5	186
11	(United States) Joe Colasacco	10	25	9	8			4	9					10	11	167
12	(United States) Jonathan Scarallo	26	11	**6**	5	7	30	6	8							165
13	(United States) Robert Wright **(M)**	17	20	10	18	14	24	19	17	20	10	18	4	16	13	157
14	(Brazil) Gustavo Rizzo	9	12	8	7	11	16	12	16	19						155
15	(United States) Brian Tomasi	22	27	21	14			2	3					11	6	150
16	(United States) Bill Jordan **(M)**	11	19	13	16	17	15	18	18	17	8			19	16	138
17	(United States) Dave Weitzenhof **(M)**	7	22	16	20	19	17	14	14	16	5					130
18	(United States) Mark Defer **(M)**	27	14	24	13	29	12	11	12					12	9	124
19	(United States) John LaRue					16	13	9	5					9	10	123
20	(United States) Dan Denison **(M)**	19	18	15	15	20	18	16	19	10	18			13	15	116
21	(United States) Rob Nicholas **(M)**	21	7											5	2	105
22	(United States) Ardie Greenamyer **(M)**	5	21	23	22	9	11	26	10					32	DNS	103
23	(United States) Dwight Rider **(M)**			14	21	8	31			11	3					100
24	(United States) Charles Finelli **(M)**					13	14	20	26			6	10	15	31	99
25	(United States) Fred Bross					18	20			13	9	10	12	23	32	96
26	(United States) Ethan Ringel					10	8	10	24							75
27	(United States) Brendan Puderbach					22	27	22	27			9	9	21	20	69
28	(Venezuela) Giancarlo Potolicchio	12	26							14	11	22	14	36	25	68
29	(Venezuela) Enzo Potolicchio **(M)**			17	DNS	6	23	DNS	11							60
30	(Australia) Steele Guiliana	6	6													58
30	(United States) Niki Coello					3	10									58
30	(Barbados) Brent Gilkes **(M)**	24	16	19	DNS	15	25			7	13					58
33	(United States) Chris Monteleone					21	22					8	11			55
34	(United States) Zach Craigo			25	11	25	29			6	17					52
35	(United States) Jeff McCusker **(M)**	13	17					21	21					17	19	50
36	(Brazil) Fabio Orsolon			11	6	28	DNS									43
37	(United States) Al Guibord, Sr. **(M)**	23	DNS									11	16			33
38	(United States) Eric Presbrey											13	15			28
39	(United States) Matt McDonough									18	12					25
40	(United States) Tom Drake **(M)**					23	21			15	DNS			28	24	22
41	(United States) Peter LeSueur													18	14	21
42	(Canada) Francis Kenette **(M)**	18	23					23	22	DNS	DNS			29	27	20
42	(United States) Blake Teeter											16	13	27	26	20
44	(United States) Tom Fatur **(M)**	25	12			27	DNS	DNS	28					DNS	DNS	18
44	(Canada) Aaron Pettipas											14	18	35	23	18
46	(United States) Jose Gerardo			18	17											17
47	(United States) Mark Felsen	14	24													15
48	(Canada) Dean Baker													22	17	13
49	(United States) Peter Gonzalez											17	5	37	DNS	11
49	(United States) Jim Hanrahan **(M)**					DNS	19					21	19	24	DNS	11
49	(United States) John Brumder													20	21	11
52	(United States) Rodin Younessi							24	23							5
52	(United States) Vaughn Horvath													31	22	5
54	(United States) Tim Walsh													26	30	2
54	(United States) Greg Strelzoff													30	28	2
56	(United States) Eric Langbein													34	DNS	1
56	(United States) Chris Gumprecht											15	DNS			1
Pos	Driver	VIR		ATL		WG1		MOH		MOS		LRP		WG2		Points

Color	Result
Gold	Winner
Silver	2nd place
Bronze	3rd place
Green	4th & 5th place
Light Blue	6th–10th place
Dark Blue	Finished (Outside Top 10)
Purple	Did not finish
Red	Did not qualify (DNQ)
Brown	Withdrawn (Wth)
Black	Disqualified (DSQ)
White	Did not start (DNS)
Blank	Did not participate (DNP)
Blank	Not competing

**In-line notation**
**Bold**	Pole position (3 points)
Italics	Ran fastest race lap (2 points)

This list only contains drivers who registered for the championship.
(M) indicates driver is participating in Masters Class for drivers over 40 years of age.
