= Formula 3 (disambiguation) =

Formula 3 is a third-tier class of open-wheel formula racing.

Formula 3 may also refer to:

- Formula 3 Brazil Open
- Formula 3 Euro Series
- Formula 3 Sudamericana
- Formula 3 (band)
