= Pipo Derani =

Brazilian racing driver (born 1993)

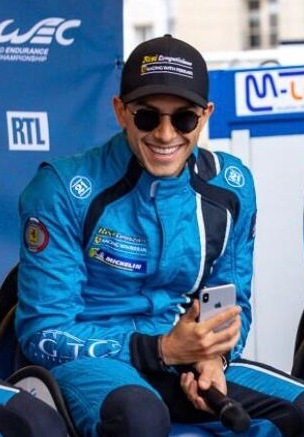
- Derani in 2019
- Nationality: (Brazil) Brazilian
- Born: Luís Felipe Derani; 12 October 1993 (age 33) São Paulo, Brazil

IMSA SportsCar Championship career
- Debut season: 2016
- Current team: DXDT Racing
- Categorisation: FIA Gold (until 2019); FIA Platinum (2020–)
- Car number: 36
- Former teams: Tequila Patrón ESM, Richard Mille AF Corse, Whelen Engineering Racing
- Starts: 80
- Wins: 12
- Poles: 15
- Fastest laps: 13
- Best finish: 1st in 2021, 2023

Previous series
- 2015–17 2014 2013 2012–13 2012 2011–12 2010 2009 2009 2009: FIA World Endurance Championship; Pro Mazda Championship; Toyota Racing Series; FIA European Formula 3 Formula 3 Euro Series; British Formula 3 German Formula Three; Formula Renault 2.0 NEC; Eurocup Formula Renault 2.0; GT3 Brasil Championship

Luís Felipe "Pipo" Derani (born 12 October 1993) is a Brazilian race car driver who is currently a factory driver for the Genesis Magma Racing program. He is the 2021 IMSA title winner in the DPi class alongside Felipe Nasr, as well as an overall winner of the 2016 24 Hours of Daytona and the 2016, 2018, 2019, and 2023 12 Hours of Sebring. Pipo is the son of the late Walter Derani and the younger brother of Rafael Derani, both well-known Brazilian racing drivers.

== Career ==
=== Karting ===
Derani made his karting debut in 2003, at the age of ten. In 2005, he was champion of the São Paulo Junior Menor Championship.

=== Formula Renault ===
Derani began his car racing career by driving in the Formula Renault 2.0 Northern European Cup with Motopark Academy in 2009. He took two podiums at Alastaro Circuit and TT Circuit Assen along with thirteen point-scoring positions to finish seventh in the championship. In Eurocup Formula Renault 2.0, he took part in six races for the same team. He finished 27th with two points coming from a ninth place at the Nürburgring.

=== Formula Three ===
In 2010, Derani stepped up to the German Formula Three Championship with the Motopark Academy team joining Formula Renault teammates Kevin Magnussen and Jimmy Eriksson at the team. Derani finished in tenth place in championship points. In 2011, Derani moved to the British Formula 3 Championship with Double R Racing. He finished fifteenth in points with a single podium finish. He also competed in the Formula 3 "all star" events such as the Formula 3 Brazil Open and Masters of Formula 3. 2012 saw Derani remain in British F3 but switch teams to Fortec Motorsport. He improved to eighth in the championship, capturing wins at Oulton Park and Brands Hatch. He also drove in three Formula 3 Euro Series races and finished sixth in the Macau Grand Prix. In 2013, Derani stayed with Fortec but moved to the FIA European Formula Three Championship where he finished eighth in points with three podium finishes.

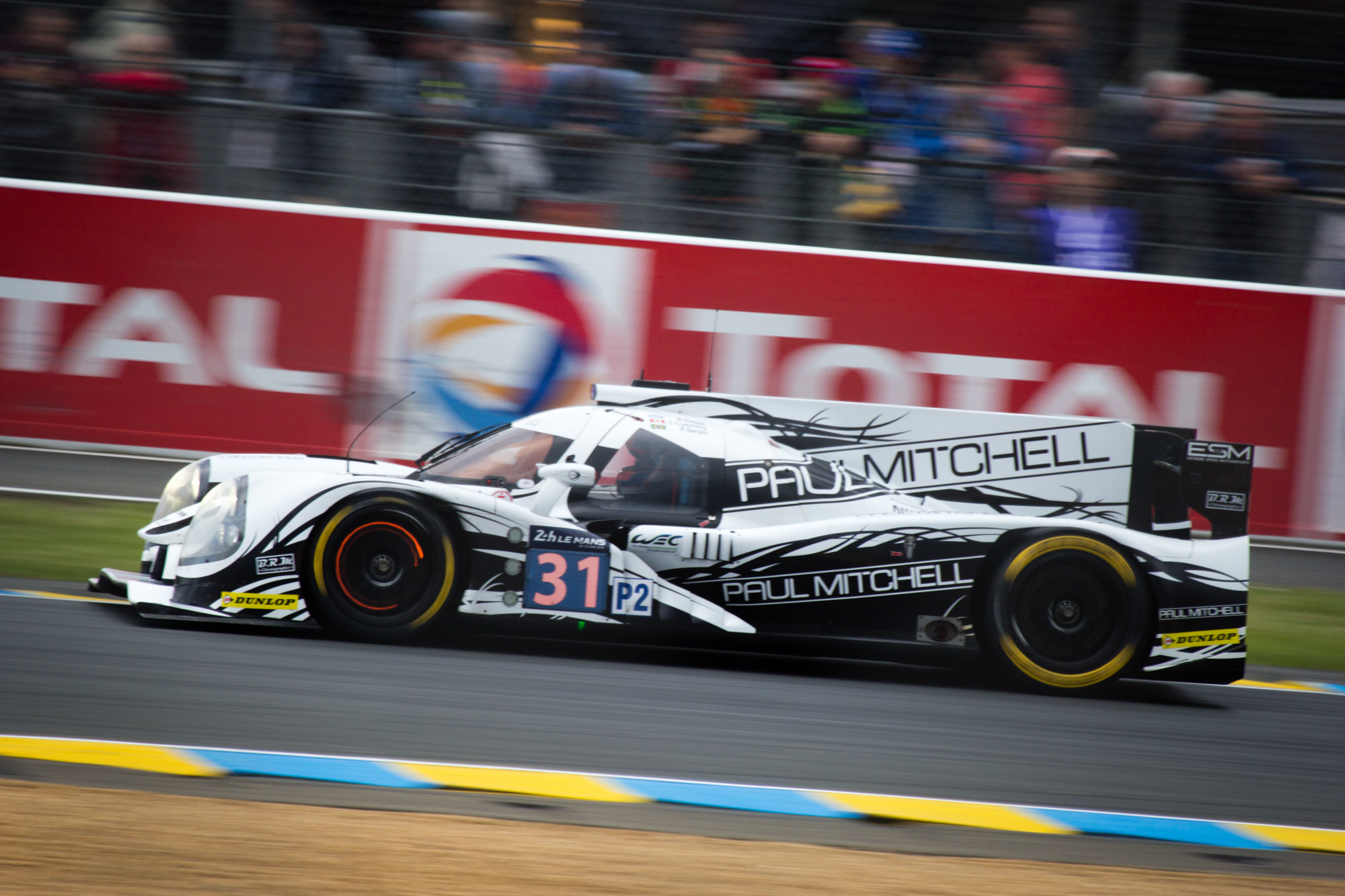
Derani driving at the 2016 24 Hours of Le Mans.

=== Sportscars ===
In 2014, Derani raced in the last two rounds of the 2014 European Le Mans Series, finishing third in the 4 Hours of Le Castellet on 14 September and retired in the 4 Hours of Estoril on 19 October, driving on both occasions an Oreca-Nissan 03R of the Irish team Murphy Prototypes. In 2016, he entered the four endurance races of the 2016 WeatherTech SportsCar Championship for Extreme Speed Motorsports with a Ligier-Honda LMP2, winning both the 2016 24 Hours of Daytona and the 12 Hours of Sebring.

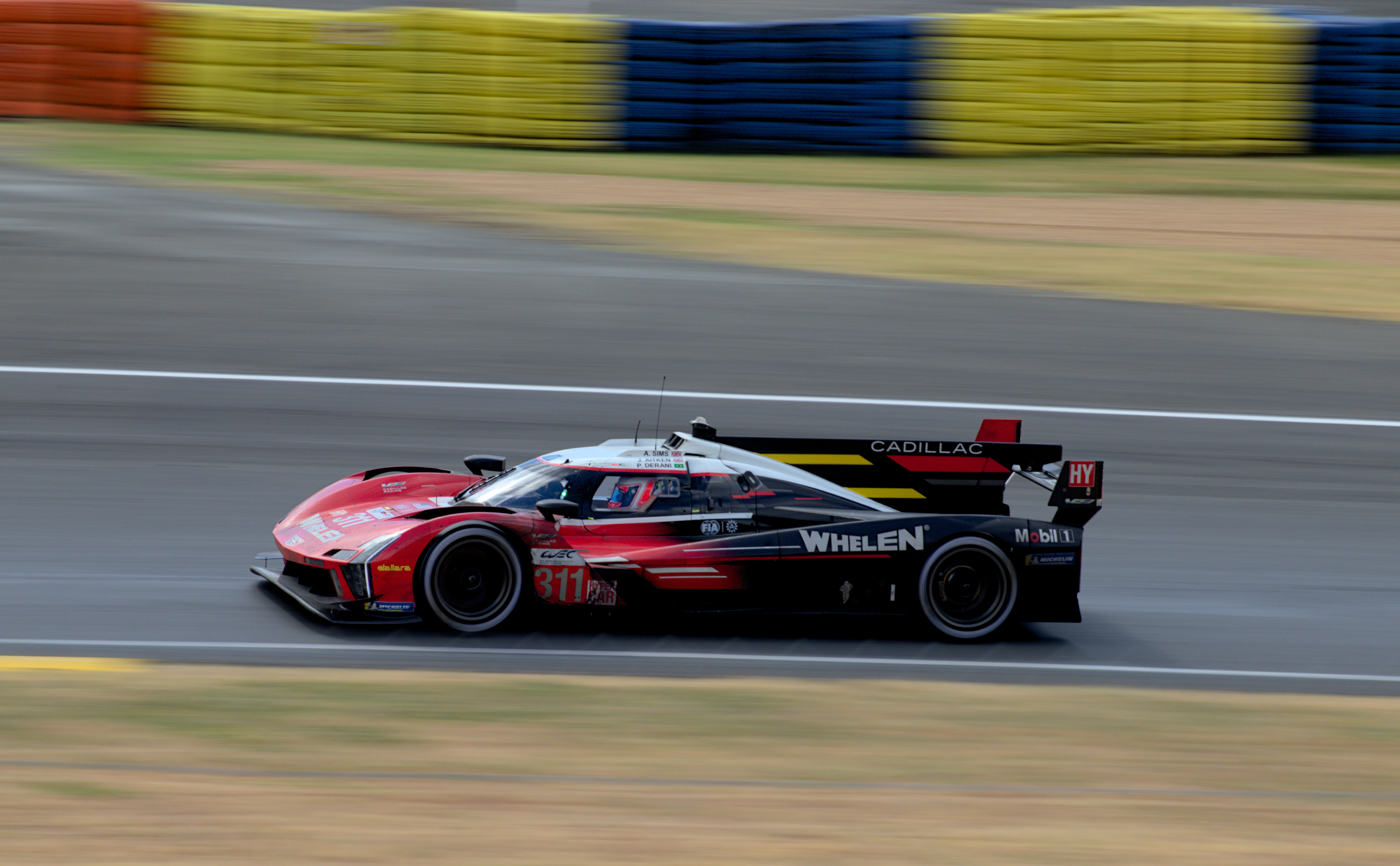
Derani driving at the 2023 24 Hours of Le Mans.

In 2017, Derani signed with Ford to become a factory driver. He raced the first three races of the 2017 FIA World Endurance Championship in the LMGTE Pro class with Ford Chip Ganassi Team UK, claiming a class win at Silverstone. Later, he drove an Oreca LMP2 for Rebellion at the FIA WEC Nürburgring round. He also drove at seven rounds of the 2017 WeatherTech SportsCar Championship for Extreme Speed Motorsports with a Nissan Onroak DPi, winning at Road America.

For the 2018 WeatherTech SportsCar Championship, Derani became a full-time driver at Extreme Speed Motorsports, winning at the 12 Hours of Sebring.

In 2020, Derani was a full-time DPi driver for Action Express Racing in the WTSCC. He was leading Petit Le Mans when he and Ricky Taylor made contact, knocking Derani's entry from contention.

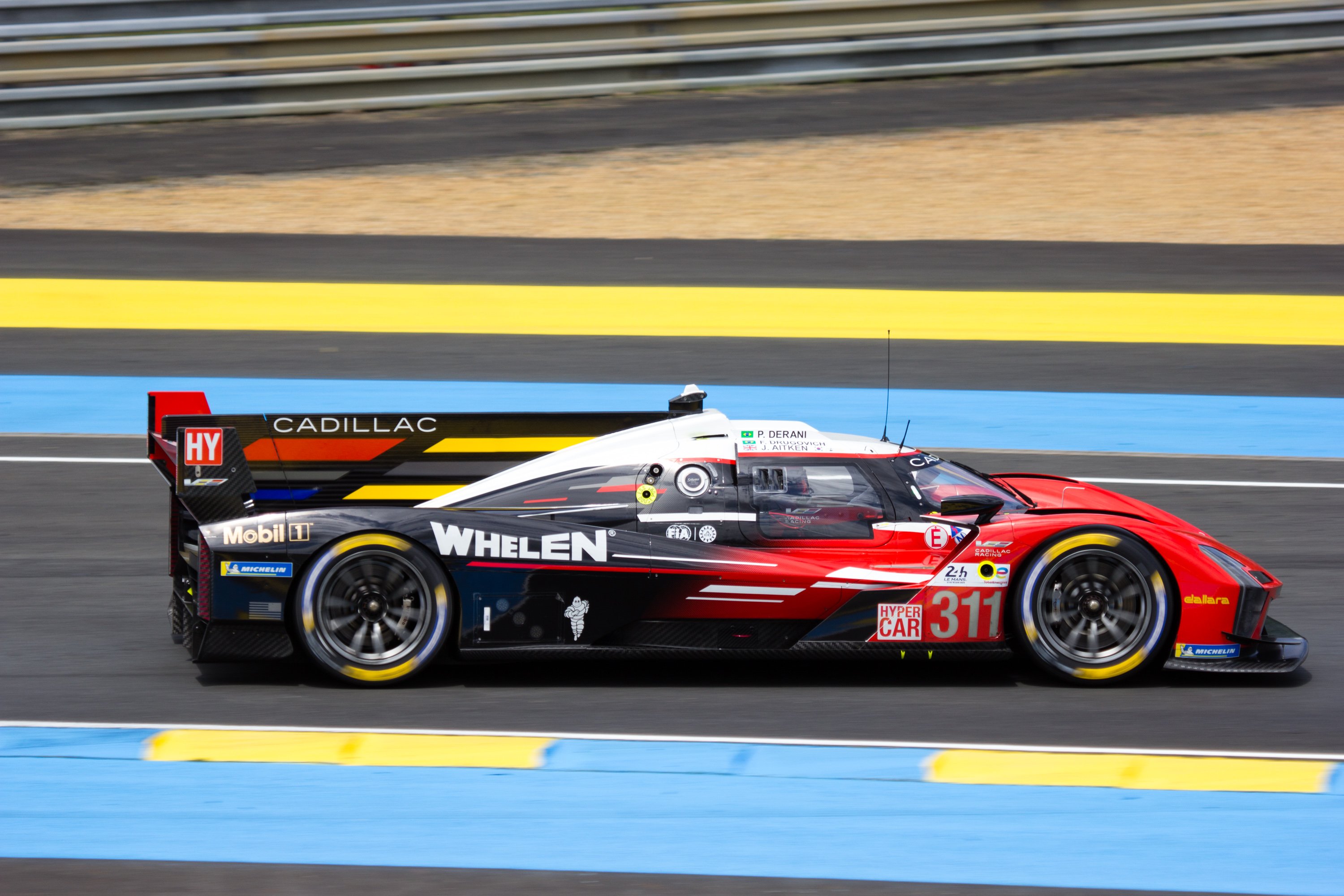
Derani's No. 311 car at the 2024 24 Hours of Le Mans

In June 2024, Action Express Racing and Derani announced that Derani would not return to the WeatherTech SportCar Championship with Action Express in 2025.

In December 2024, Derani and André Lotterer were announced the drivers for the new Genesis LMDh program which intends to compete in the World Endurance Championship for the 2026 season.

== Racing career ==
=== Career summary ===
Season	Series	Team	Races	Wins	Poles	F/Laps	Podiums	Points	Position
2009	Formula Renault 2.0 NEC	Motopark Academy	16	0	0	1	2	192	7th
2009	Eurocup Formula Renault 2.0	Motopark Academy	6	0	0	0	0	2	27th
2009	GT3 Brasil Championship	CRT Brasil	4	0	0	0	0	29	28th
2010	German Formula 3 Championship	Motopark Academy	18	0	0	0	0	20	10th
2010	GT Brasil	WB Motorsport	2	0	0	0	0	6	35th
2011	British Formula 3 Championship	Double R Racing	30	0	0	0	1	36	15th
2011	FIA Formula 3 International Trophy	Double R Racing	3	0	0	0	0	N/A	NC
2011	Masters of Formula 3	Prema Powerteam	1	0	0	0	0	N/A	NC
2011	Formula 3 Brazil Open	Hitech Racing Brazil	1	0	0	0	0	N/A	NC
2012	British Formula 3 Championship	Fortec Motorsport	28	2	0	2	5	146	8th
2012	Formula 3 Euro Series	Fortec Motorsport	3	0	0	0	0	N/A	NC
2012	Masters of Formula 3	Fortec Motorsport	1	0	0	0	0	N/A	11th
2012	Macau Grand Prix	Fortec Motorsport	1	0	0	0	0	N/A	6th
2012	Formula 3 Brazil Open	Cesário Fórmula	1	0	0	0	0	N/A	NC
2013	FIA Formula 3 European Championship	Fortec Motorsports	30	0	0	0	3	143	8th
2013	Masters of Formula 3	Fortec Motorsports	1	0	0	0	0	N/A	8th
2014	Pro Mazda Championship	Team Pelfrey	6	0	0	0	1	88	14th
2014	European Le Mans Series – LMP2	Murphy Prototypes	2	0	1	1	1	24	12th
2014	German Formula 3 Championship	ADM Motorsport	3	0	0	0	0	0	NC†
2015	FIA World Endurance Championship – LMP2	G-Drive Racing	8	1	1	0	7	134	**3rd**
2015	24 Hours of Le Mans – LMP2	G-Drive Racing	1	0	0	0	0	N/A	4th
2016	FIA World Endurance Championship – LMP2	Extreme Speed Motorsports	9	0	0	1	4	116	4th
2016	24 Hours of Le Mans – LMP2	Extreme Speed Motorsports	1	0	0	0	0	N/A	16th
2016	IMSA SportsCar Championship – Prototype	Extreme Speed Motorsports	4	2	0	1	3	128	12th
2016	Blancpain GT Series Endurance Cup	Garage 59	1	0	0	0	0	0	NC
2016	Intercontinental GT Challenge	Garage 59	1	0	0	0	0	1	17th
2017	IMSA SportsCar Championship – Prototype	Tequila Patrón ESM	7	1	1	1	1	181	9th
2017	FIA World Endurance Championship – LMGTE Pro	Ford Chip Ganassi Team UK	3	1	1	0	2	74	10th
2017	24 Hours of Le Mans – LMGTE Pro	Ford Chip Ganassi Team UK	1	0	0	0	1	N/A	**2nd**
2017	FIA World Endurance Championship – LMP2	Vaillante Rebellion	1	0	0	0	0	12	23rd
2017–18	Asian Le Mans Series – LMP2	BBT	4	0	1	1	4	70	**2nd**
2018	IMSA SportsCar Championship – Prototype	Tequila Patrón ESM	10	2	2	0	2	232	9th
2018	24 Hours of Le Mans – LMGTE Pro	AF Corse	1	0	0	0	0	N/A	5th
2018	Stock Car Brasil	Cimed Racing	1	0	0	0	0	0	NC†
2018–19	Asian Le Mans Series – GT	Spirit of Race	3	1	2	0	1	35	7th
2019	IMSA SportsCar Championship – DPi	Whelen Engineering Racing	10	2	1	4	5	297	**2nd**
2019	Blancpain GT Series Endurance Cup	M-Sport Team Bentley	1	0	0	0	0	0	NC
2019	Intercontinental GT Challenge	M-Sport Team Bentley	1	0	0	0	0	0	NC
2019	24 Hours of Le Mans – LMGTE Pro	Risi Competizione	1	0	0	0	0	N/A	11th
2019–20	FIA World Endurance Championship	Rebellion Racing	1	0	0	0	0	0	NC†
2020	IMSA SportsCar Championship – DPi	Whelen Engineering Racing	9	1	1	1	5	258	4th
2021	IMSA SportsCar Championship – DPi	Whelen Engineering Racing	10	4	4	3	8	3407	**1st**
2021	FIA World Endurance Championship – Hypercar	Glickenhaus Racing	2	0	0	0	0	24	7th
2021	24 Hours of Le Mans – Hypercar	Glickenhaus Racing	1	0	0	0	0	N/A	4th
2022	IMSA SportsCar Championship – DPi	Whelen Engineering Racing	10	0	0	2	5	3083	5th
2022	FIA World Endurance Championship – Hypercar	Glickenhaus Racing	3	0	2	0	2	47	5th
2022	24 Hours of Le Mans – Hypercar	Glickenhaus Racing	1	0	0	0	0	N/A	4th
2023	IMSA SportsCar Championship – GTP	Whelen Engineering Racing	9	1	2	3	3	2733	**1st**
2023	24 Hours of Le Mans – Hypercar	Action Express Racing	1	0	0	0	0	N/A	10th
2024	IMSA SportsCar Championship – GTP	Whelen Cadillac Racing	9	0	4	1	3	2687	4th
2024	24 Hours of Le Mans - Hypercar	Whelen Cadillac Racing	1	0	0	0	0	N/A	15th
2024	IMSA SportsCar Championship – LMP2	Richard Mille AF Corse	1	0	0	0	0	240	52nd
2025	European Le Mans Series – LMP2	CLX Motorsport	3	0	0	0	1	25	11th
2025	IMSA SportsCar Championship – GTD	DXDT Racing	1	0	0	0	0	136	87th
2026	FIA World Endurance Championship - Hypercar	Genesis Magma Racing	8	0	1	0	0	11	20th
2026	European Le Mans Series - LMP2	Nielsen Racing	1	0	0	0	0	2	19th

^{†} As Derani was a guest driver, he was ineligible for points.

=== Complete Formula Renault 2.0 NEC results ===
(key) (Races in bold indicate pole position) (Races in italics indicate fastest lap)

Year	Entrant	1	2	3	4	5	6	7	8	9	10	11	12	13	14	15	16	DC	Points
2009	Motopark Academy	ZAN; 1 Ret	ZAN; 2; 14	HOC; 1; 5	HOC; 2 Ret	ALA; 1; 6	ALA; 2; 2	OSC; 1; 13	OSC; 2; 12	ASS; 1; 6	ASS; 2; 2	MST; 1; 6	MST; 2; 4	NÜR; 1; 4	NÜR; 2 Ret	SPA; 1; 8	SPA; 2; 9	7th	192

=== Complete Eurocup Formula Renault 2.0 results ===
(key) (Races in bold indicate pole position; races in italics indicate fastest lap)

Year	Entrant	1	2	3	4	5	6	7	8	9	10	11	12	13	14	DC	Points
2009	Motopark Academy	CAT; 1	CAT; 2	SPA; 1; 20	SPA; 2 Ret	HUN; 1	HUN; 2	SIL; 1; 18	SIL; 2; 17	LMS; 1	LMS; 2	NÜR; 1; 9	NÜR; 2 Ret	ALC; 1	ALC; 2	27th	2

=== Complete FIA Formula 3 European Championship results ===
(key)

Year	Entrant	Engine	1	2	3	4	5	6	7	8	9	10	11	12	13	14	15	16	17	18	19	20	21	22	23	24	25	26	27	28	29	30	DC	Points
2012	Fortec Motorsports	Mercedes	HOC; 1	HOC; 2	PAU; 1 Ret	PAU; 2; 5	BRH; 1	BRH; 2	RBR; 1	RBR; 2	NOR; 1 Ret	NOR; 2; 21	SPA; 1; 8	SPA; 2; 7	NÜR; 1; 4	NÜR; 2 Ret	ZAN; 1	ZAN; 2	VAL; 1	VAL; 2	HOC; 1; 10	HOC; 2 Ret											NC	0
2013	Fortec Motorsports	Mercedes	MNZ; 1; 11	MNZ; 2; 19	MNZ; 3; 5	SIL; 1; 9	SIL; 2; 8	SIL; 3 Ret	HOC; 1; 14	HOC; 2; 14	HOC; 3; 10	BRH; 1; 14	BRH; 2; 18	BRH; 3; 17	RBR; 1; 18	RBR; 2; 11	RBR; 3; 9	NOR; 1; 15	NOR; 2; 5	NOR; 3; 7	NÜR; 1; 6	NÜR; 2; 2	NÜR; 3; 3	ZAN; 1; 19	ZAN; 2; 5	ZAN; 3; 5	VAL; 1; 6	VAL; 2; 6	VAL; 3; 2	HOC; 1; 7	HOC; 2; 11	HOC; 3 Ret	8th	143

=== American open–wheel racing ===
(key) (Races in bold indicate pole position; races in italics indicate fastest lap)

==== Complete Pro Mazda Championship results ====
Year	Team	1	2	3	4	5	6	7	8	9	10	11	12	13	14	Rank	Points
2014	Team Pelfrey	STP; 4	STP; 3	BAR; 6	BAR; 4	IMS; 9	IMS; 18	LOR	HOU	HOU	MOH	MOH	MIL	SON	SON	14th	88

=== Complete European Le Mans Series results ===
Year	Entrant	Class	Chassis	Engine	1	2	3	4	5	6	Rank	Points
2014	Murphy Prototypes	LMP2	Oreca 03	Nissan VK45DE 4.5 L V8	SIL	IMO	RBR	**LEC**; 3	EST; 6		12th	24
2025	CLX Motorsport	LMP2	Oreca 07	Gibson GK428 4.2 L V8	CAT; Ret	LEC; 3	IMO; 5	SPA	SIL	ALG	11th	25
2026	Nielsen Racing	LMP2	Oreca 07	Gibson GK428 4.2 L V8	CAT	LEC	IMO	SPA	SIL	ALG; 9	19th	2

=== Complete FIA World Endurance Championship results ===
Year	Entrant	Class	Car	Engine	1	2	3	4	5	6	7	8	9	Rank	Points
2015	G-Drive Racing	LMP2	Ligier JS P2	Nissan VK45DE 4.5 L V8	**SIL**; 2	SPA; 1	LMS; 3	NÜR; 3	COA; 3	FUJ; 3	SHA; Ret	BHR; 3		3rd	134
2016	Extreme Speed Motorsports	LMP2	Ligier JS P2	Nissan VK45DE 4.5 L V8	SIL; 2	SPA; 2	LMS; 8	NÜR; 3	MEX; 3	COA; 5	FUJ; 5	SHA; 5	BHR; 4	4th	116
2017	Ford Chip Ganassi Team UK	LMGTE Pro	Ford GT	Ford EcoBoost 3.5 L Turbo V6	**SIL**; 1	SPA; 4	LMS; 2							10th	74
2017	Vaillante Rebellion	LMP2	Oreca 07	Gibson GK428 4.2 L V8				NÜR; 4	MEX	COA	FUJ	SHA	BHR	23rd	12
2019–20	Rebellion Racing	LMP1	Rebellion R13	Gibson GL458 4.5 L V8	SIL; 3	FUJ	SHA	BHR	COA	SPA	LMS	BHR		NC†	0†
2021	Glickenhaus Racing	Hypercar	Glickenhaus SCG 007 LMH	Glickenhaus 3.5 L Turbo V8	SPA	ALG	MNZ; Ret	LMS; 4	BHR	BHR				7th	24
2022	Glickenhaus Racing	Hypercar	Glickenhaus SCG 007 LMH	Glickenhaus 3.5 L Turbo V8	SEB	**SPA**; 3	LMS; 3	**MNZ**; Ret	FUJ	BHR				5th	47
2026	Genesis Magma Racing	Hypercar	Genesis GMR-001	Genesis G8MR 3.2 L Turbo V8	IMO; 15	SPA; 8	LMS; Ret	SÃO; 15	COA; 7	FUJ; 15	**CAT**; 16	MNZ; 13		20th	11

^{†} As the #3 Rebellion was not a full-season entry, it was not eligible to score points.

=== Complete IMSA SportsCar Championship results ===
(key) (Races in bold indicate pole position; races in italics indicate fastest lap)

Year	Team	No.	Class	Car	Engine	1	2	3	4	5	6	7	8	9	10	Rank	Points	Ref
2016	Tequila Patrón ESM	2	P	Ligier JS P2	Honda HR35TT 3.5 L V6 Turbo	DAY; 1	SEB; 1	LBH	LGA	DET	WGL; 9	MOS	ELK	COA	PET; 2	12th	128	
2017	Tequila Patrón ESM	2	P	Nissan Onroak DPi	Nissan VR38DETT 3.8 L Turbo V6	DAY; 4	SEB; 11	LBH	COA	DET	**WGL**; 7					9th	181	
2017	Tequila Patrón ESM	22	P	Nissan Onroak DPi	Nissan VR38DETT 3.8 L Turbo V6							MOS; 9	ELK; 1	LGA; 8	PET; 4	9th	181	
2018	Tequila Patrón ESM	22	P	Nissan Onroak DPi	Nissan VR38DETT 3.8 L Turbo V6	DAY; 18	SEB; 1	LBH; 12	MOH; 9	**DET**; 7	WGL; 16	MOS; 12	ELK; 6	LGA; 1	**PET**; 6	9th	232	
2019	Whelen Engineering Racing	31	DPi	Cadillac DPi-V.R	Cadillac 5.5 L V8	DAY; 2	SEB; 1	LBH; 6	MOH; 4	DET; 2	WGL; 7	MOS; 4	ELK; 4	LGA; 3	**PET**; 1	2nd	297	
2020	Whelen Engineering Racing	31	DPi	Cadillac DPi-V.R	Cadillac 5.5 L V8	DAY; 7	DAY; 5	**SEB**; 1	ELK; 3	ATL; 3	MOH; 2	PET; 5	LGA; 3	SEB; 6		4th	258	
2021	Whelen Engineering Racing	31	DPi	Cadillac DPi-V.R	Cadillac 5.5 L V8	**DAY**; 6	**SEB**; 6	MOH; 2	DET; 2	WGL; 4	WGL; 1	**ELK**; 1	LGA; 3	**LBH**; 1	PET; 2	1st	3407	
2022	Whelen Engineering Racing	31	DPi	Cadillac DPi-V.R	Cadillac 5.5 L V8	DAY; 4	SEB; 3	LBH; 5	LGA; 3	MOH; 3	DET; 6	WGL; 5	MOS; 3	ELK; 6	PET; 2	5th	3083	
2023	Whelen Engineering Racing	31	GTP	Cadillac V-LMDh	Cadillac LMC55R 5. 5 L V8	DAY; 5	**SEB**; 1	LBH; 5	LGA; 3	WGL; 2	MOS; 7	**ELK**; 6	IMS; 4	PET; 6		1st	2733	
2024	Whelen Engineering Racing	31	GTP	Cadillac V-Series.R	Cadillac LMC55R 5. 5 L V8	**DAY**; 2	**SEB**; 10	**LBH**; 2	LGA; 2	DET; 6	WGL; 8		ELK; 4	IMS; 9	**PET**; 5	4th	2687	
2024	Richard Mille AF Corse	88	LMP2	Oreca 07	Gibson GK428 V8							MOS; 9				52nd	240	
2025	DXDT Racing	36	GTD	Chevrolet Corvette Z06 GT3.R	Chevrolet LT6 5.5 L V8	DAY; 19	SEB	LBH	LGA	WGL	MOS	ELK	VIR	IMS	PET	87th	136	

=== Complete 24 Hours of Daytona results ===
Year	Team	Co-drivers	Car	Class	Laps	Pos.	Class Pos.
2016	(United States) Tequila Patrón ESM	(United States) Scott Sharp (United States) Ed Brown (United States) Johannes van Overbeek	Ligier JS P2	P	736	**1st**	**1st**
2017	(United States) Tequila Patrón ESM	(United States) Scott Sharp (United Kingdom) Ryan Dalziel (New Zealand) Brendon Hartley	Nissan Onroak DPi	P	656	4th	4th
2018	(United States) Tequila Patrón ESM	(France) Nicolas Lapierre (United States) Johannes van Overbeek	Nissan Onroak DPi	P	438	DNF	DNF
2019	(United States) Whelen Engineering Racing	(Brazil) Felipe Nasr (United States) Eric Curran	Cadillac DPi-V.R	DPi	593	**2nd**	**2nd**
2020	(United States) Whelen Engineering Racing	(Brazil) Felipe Nasr (Portugal) Filipe Albuquerque (United Kingdom) Mike Conway	Cadillac DPi-V.R	DPi	822	7th	7th
2021	(United States) Whelen Engineering Racing	(United Kingdom) Mike Conway (United States) Chase Elliott (Brazil) Felipe Nasr	Cadillac DPi-V.R	DPi	783	8th	6th
2022	(United States) Whelen Engineering Racing	(United Kingdom) Mike Conway (United States) Tristan Nunez	Cadillac DPi-V.R	DPi	761	4th	4th
2023	(United States) Whelen Engineering Racing	(United Kingdom) Alexander Sims (United Kingdom) Jack Aitken	Cadillac V-Series.R	GTP	771	5th	5th

=== Complete 24 Hours of Le Mans results ===
Year	Team	Co-Drivers	Car	Class	Laps	Pos.	Class Pos.
2015	(Russia) G-Drive Racing	(Colombia) Gustavo Yacamán (Mexico) Ricardo González	Ligier JS P2-Nissan	LMP2	354	12th	4th
2016	(United States) Extreme Speed Motorsports	(Canada) Chris Cumming (United Kingdom) Ryan Dalziel	Ligier JS P2-Nissan	LMP2	291	42nd	16th
2017	(United States) Ford Chip Ganassi Team UK	(United Kingdom) Harry Tincknell (United Kingdom) Andy Priaulx	Ford GT	GTE; Pro	340	18th	**2nd**
2018	(Italy) AF Corse	(Finland) Toni Vilander (Italy) Antonio Giovinazzi	Ferrari 488 GTE Evo	GTE; Pro	341	20th	5th
2019	(United States) Risi Competizione	(France) Jules Gounon (United Kingdom) Oliver Jarvis	Ferrari 488 GTE Evo	GTE; Pro	329	40th	11th
2021	(United States) Glickenhaus Racing	(France) Franck Mailleux (France) Olivier Pla	Glickenhaus SCG 007 LMH	Hypercar	367	4th	4th
2022	(United States) Glickenhaus Racing	(France) Romain Dumas (France) Olivier Pla	Glickenhaus SCG 007 LMH	Hypercar	370	4th	4th
2023	(United States) Action Express Racing	(United Kingdom) Jack Aitken (United Kingdom) Alexander Sims	Cadillac V-Series.R	Hypercar	324	17th	10th
2024	(United States) Whelen Cadillac Racing	(United Kingdom) Jack Aitken (Brazil) Felipe Drugovich	Cadillac V-Series.R	Hypercar	280	29th	15th
2026	(South Korea) Genesis Magma Racing	(France) Mathys Jaubert (Germany) André Lotterer	Genesis GMR-001	Hypercar	263	DNF	DNF

Sporting positions
Preceded by Felipe Nasr; Eric Curran	Michelin Endurance Cup; Champion; 2019; With: Felipe Nasr & Eric Curran	Succeeded by Ryan Briscoe; Renger van der Zande
Preceded by Hélio Castroneves; Ricky Taylor	IMSA SportsCar Championship; Champion; 2021; With: Felipe Nasr	Succeeded by Tom Blomqvist; Oliver Jarvis
Preceded by Tom Blomqvist; Oliver Jarvis	IMSA SportsCar Championship; Champion; 2023; With: Alexander Sims	Succeeded by Felipe Nasr; Dane Cameron
Preceded by Tom Blomqvist; Oliver Jarvis	Michelin Endurance Cup; Champion; 2023; With: Alexander Sims & Jack Aitken	Succeeded by Felipe Nasr; Dane Cameron
