= F2000 Championship Series =

Open wheel road racing series in North America

- Category: Single seaters
- Country: United States
- Inaugural season: 2006
- Drivers: 25 (2018)
- Constructors: Van Diemen, RFR, Mygale, Citation, Piper, Radon Sport
- Engine suppliers: Mazda, Ford
- Drivers' champion: (United States) Carter Sheets
- Official website: F2000ChampionshipSeries.com

The F2000 Championship Series is a North American–based open wheel road racing series based on Formula Continental, a wings and slicks series that is designed to be the second step after Formula F 1600.

Unlike most junior formula series which have a spec car, the F2000 Championship Series is open to multiple chassis manufacturers such as Van Diemen, Citation, Mygale, RFR, Radon and Piper. The series allows the modern 2.0L Mazda MZR engine as well as the older Ford Zetec and Ford Pinto engines.

The series has existed in one form or another since the 1970s. The current championship has been in place since 2006 and was founded by a group of Sports Car Club of America racers as a pro series for SCCA Formula Continental club racers looking for more competition, and a proving ground for aspiring open wheel racers.

2008 champion Anders Krohn has gone on to Star Mazda as has 2009 champion Chris Miller. In 2011 Krohn raced in Indy Lights against 2010 F2000 champion Victor Carbone.

In 2010, a revival of the previous series named the U.S. F2000 National Championship, intended for young aspiring professional drivers, began racing. It uses a similar specification of car and is sanctioned by IndyCar. However, as that series now is a single-spec series, this series is a professional Formula Continental based series and is the second step, after the F1600 (the traditional Formula Ford).

F2000 currently races under the Formula Race Promotions banner with F1600 and Formula Atlantic.

== Champions ==
Season	Champion	Team Champion	Chassis	Masters Champion
2006	(United States) Matt McDonough		Van Diemen	
2007	(United States) Cole Morgan	(United States) St. Clair Motorsports	Van Diemen	
2008	(Norway) Anders Krohn	(United States) Andersen Racing	Van Diemen	(United States) Tim Minor
2009	(United States) Chris Miller	(United States) JDC Motorsports	Van Diemen	(United States) Tom Fatur
2010	(Brazil) Victor Carbone	(United States) Alegra Motorsports	Van Diemen	(United States) Phil Lombardi
2011	(Canada) Remy Audette	(Canada) Audette Racing	Van Diemen	(United States) Tim Minor
2012	(Venezuela) Roberto La Rocca	(Venezuela) HP-Tech Motorsport	Van Diemen	(United States) Tim Minor
2013	(United States) Tim Minor	(United States) Ski Motorsports	Citation	(United States) Tim Minor
2014	(United States) Tim Minor	(United States) Ski Motorsports	Citation	(United States) Tim Minor
2015	(United States) Sam Beasley	(United States) Legacy Autosport	Mygale	(Canada) Steve Bamford
2016	(Canada) Steve Bamford	(United States) Rice Race Prep	Citation	(Canada) Steve Bamford
2017	(United States) Brandon Dixon	(United States) Brandon Dixon Racing	Citation	(United States) Brandon Dixon
2018	(United States) Steve Jenks	(United States) Tumenas Motorsports	Elan DP08	(United States) Steve Jenks
2019	(United States) Brandon Dixon	(United States) Brandon Dixon Racing	Citation	(United States) Brandon Dixon
2020	(United States) Brandon Dixon	(United States) Brandon Dixon Racing	Citation	
2021	(United States) Trent Walko	(United States) Global Racing Team	Van Diemen	
2022	(Canada) JC Trahan	(United States) Global Racing Team	Van Diemen	
2023	(United States) JT Novosielski	(United States) JT Novosielski Racing	RFR	
2024	(United States) Gabriel Cahan	(United States) Cahan Racing Team	Van Diemen	
2025	(United States) Carter Sheets	(United States) Layke MotorSports	Van Diemen	

== See also ==
- Formula Ford
- USF2000 Championship
