= Roberto La Rocca =

Venezuelan racing driver

- Born: 9 July 1988 (age 38) Caracas, Venezuela

Previous series
- 2012-13 2011–12 2009: European F3 Open Championship; F2000 Championship Series; Skip Barber National Championship

Championship titles
- 2012: F2000 Championship Series

Roberto La Rocca (born 9 July 1988) is a Venezuelan racing driver.

== Career ==
=== Early career ===
Born in Caracas, La Rocca started his racing career in Skip Barber Southern Regional Series in 2008, finishing fourth. Also he spent ten races in Skip Barber National Championship in 2009.

After one-year absence, La Rocca switched to F2000 Championship Series. He joined HP-Tech team and finished on the fifth place in the championship. He remained in the series for 2012 with the same team, winning eleven from fourteen races on his way to the championship title.

=== European F3 Open ===
Also in 2012, La Rocca moved to Europe and debuted in European F3 Open Championship with Team West-Tec F3. He finished in tenth with six point-scoring finishes. La Rocca would continue with Team West-Tec in 2013 European F3 Open Championship.

=== GP3 Series ===
La Rocca was supposed to make his GP3 Series debut with Bamboo Engineering in 2013. However, two months before the start of the season, he was replaced by Carmen Jordá due to uncertainty from his sponsors.

=== Auto GP ===
In August 2013, La Rocca signed on a short-term deal with Virtuosi Racing by Comtec. In the first round, he finished seventh beating the drivers in the main team Virtuosi Racing. <Comtec Racing> are looking into the possibility of a main assault in Auto GP next season alongside there Renault 3.5 campaign, a series which may interest La Rocca.

== Racing record ==
=== Career summary ===
| Season | Series | Team | Races | Wins | Poles | F/Laps | Podiums | Points | Position |
|---|---|---|---|---|---|---|---|---|---|
| 2011 | F2000 Championship Series | HP-Tech | 14 | 0 | 0 | 0 | 2 | 336 | 5th |
| 2012 | F2000 Championship Series | HP-Tech | 14 | 11 | 12 | 12 | 13 | 626 | **1st** |
| 2012 | European F3 Open | Team West-Tec F3 | 12 | 0 | 0 | 0 | 0 | 44 | 10th |
| 2012 | Formula 3 Brazil Open | Hitech Racing Brazil | 1 | 0 | 0 | 0 | 0 | N/A | NC |
| 2013 | Formula 3 Brazil Open | Hitech Racing Brazil | 1 | 0 | 0 | 0 | 0 | N/A | 4th |
| 2013 | Auto GP Series | Comtec by Virtuosi | 6 | 0 | 0 | 0 | 0 | 20 | 15th |
| 2013 | European F3 Open Championship | Team West-Tec F3 | 6 | 0 | 0 | 0 | 1 | 15 | 14th |
| 2017 | IMSA Prototype Challenge – LMP3 | HP-Tech | 2 | 0 | 0 | 0 | 1 | 30 | 17th |

=== Complete Auto GP results ===
(key) (Races in bold indicate pole position) (Races in italics indicate fastest lap)

| Year | Entrant | 1 | 2 | 3 | 4 | 5 | 6 | 7 | 8 | 9 | 10 | 11 | 12 | 13 | 14 | 15 | 16 | Pos | Points |
|---|---|---|---|---|---|---|---|---|---|---|---|---|---|---|---|---|---|---|---|
| 2013 | Comtec by Virtuosi | MNZ; 1 | MNZ; 2 | MAR; 1 | MAR; 2 | HUN; 1 | HUN; 2 | SIL; 1 | SIL; 2 | MUG; 1 | MUG; 2 | NÜR; 1; 8 | NÜR; 2; 7 | DON; 1; 11 | DON; 2; 7 | BRN; 1; 8 | BRN; 2; 7 | 15th | 20 |

Sporting positions
| Preceded by Remy Audette | F2000 Championship Series; Champion; 2012 | Succeeded by Tim Minor |
