= 2014 Formula 3 Brazil Open =

Formula 3 event in Brazil

Seasons
- ← 2013 none →

Autódromo José Carlos Pace

The 2014 Formula 3 Brazil Open was the fifth Formula 3 Brazil Open race held at Autódromo José Carlos Pace from January 16–19, 2014.

== Drivers and teams ==
- All cars are powered by Berta engines, and will run on Pirelli tyres.

2014 Entry List
Team	No	Driver	Class	Chassis
(Brazil) Cesário Fórmula	8	(Russia) Dzhon Simonyan	A	Dallara F309
(Brazil) Cesário Fórmula	28	(Brazil) Artur Fortunato	B	Dallara F301
(Brazil) R&R Weissach	15	(Brazil) Raphael Raucci	A	Dallara F309
(Brazil) R&R Weissach	53	(Brazil) Victor Miranda	B	Dallara F301
(Brazil) R&R Weissach	71	(Brazil) Lukas Moraes	B	Dallara F301
(Brazil) Prop Car	17	(Brazil) Fernando Galera	B	Dallara F301
(United Kingdom) Hitech Racing	23	(Brazil) Victor Franzoni	A	Dallara F309
(United Kingdom) Hitech Racing	66	(Brazil) Felipe Guimarães	A	Dallara F309
(Brazil) EMB Racing	25	(United States) Nicolas Silva	B	Dallara F301
(Brazil) Capital Motorsports	32	(Brazil) Leandro Florenzo	B	Dallara F301

Icon	Class
A	Class A
B	Class B

== Classification ==
=== Qualifying ===
Pos	No.	Driver	Class	Team	Time
1	66	(Brazil) Felipe Guimarães	A	Hitech Racing	1:31.327
2	23	(Brazil) Victor Franzoni	A	Hitech Racing	1:31.825
3	71	(Brazil) Lukas Moraes	B	R&R Weissach	1:32.258
4	28	(Brazil) Artur Fortunato	B	Cesário Fórmula	1:32.587
5	8	(Russia) Dzhon Simonyan	A	Cesário Fórmula	1:32.935
6	17	(Brazil) Fernando Galera	B	Prop Car	1:33.181
7	15	(Brazil) Raphael Raucci	A	R&R Weissach	1:33.396
8	25	(United States) Nicolas Silva	B	EMB Racing	1:33.844
9	32	(Brazil) Leandro Florenzo	B	Capital Motorsport	1:34.086
10	53	(Brazil) Victor Miranda	B	R&R Weissach	1:35.477

=== Race 1 ===
Pos	No.	Driver	Class	Team	Laps	Time/Retired	Grid
1	66	(Brazil) Felipe Guimarães	A	Hitech Racing	16	30:00.091	1
2	23	(Brazil) Victor Franzoni	A	Hitech Racing	16	1.555	2
3	15	(Brazil) Raphael Raucci	A	R&R Weissach	16	41.946	7
4	17	(Brazil) Fernando Galera	B	Prop Car	16	45.034	6
5	32	(Brazil) Leandro Florenzo	B	Capital Motorsport	16	49.232	9
6	28	(Brazil) Artur Fortunato	B	Cesário Fórmula	16	50.954	4
7	25	(United States) Nicolas Silva	B	EMB Racing	15	1 Lap	8
8	53	(Brazil) Victor Miranda	B	R&R Weissach	15	1 Lap	10
9	8	(Russia) Dzhon Simonyan	A	Cesário Fórmula	15	1 Lap	5
Ret	71	(Brazil) Lukas Moraes	B	R&R Weissach	3	Retired	3
Fastest lap: Victor Franzoni, 1:38.213, 157.946 km/h (98.143 mph) on lap 16

=== Race 2 ===
Pos	No.	Driver	Class	Team	Laps	Time/Retired	Grid
1	66	(Brazil) Felipe Guimarães	A	Hitech Racing	20	30:37.724	1
2	8	(Russia) Dzhon Simonyan	A	Cesário Fórmula	20	26.820	9
3	15	(Brazil) Raphael Raucci	A	R&R Weissach	20	42.108	3
4	28	(Brazil) Artur Fortunato	B	Cesário Fórmula	20	52.361	6
5	32	(Brazil) Leandro Florenzo	B	Capital Motorsport	20	1:00.164	5
6	53	(Brazil) Victor Miranda	B	R&R Weissach	20	1:17.107	8
Ret	25	(United States) Nicolas Silva	B	EMB Racing	14	Retired	7
Ret	17	(Brazil) Fernando Galera	B	Prop Car	14	Retired	4
Ret	71	(Brazil) Lukas Moraes	B	R&R Weissach	8	Retired	10
Ret	23	(Brazil) Victor Franzoni	A	Hitech Racing	8	Retired	2
Fastest lap: Felipe Guimarães, 1:30.782, 170.875 km/h (106.177 mph) on lap 20

=== Pre-final Grid ===
Pos	Driver	Team	Points
1	(Brazil) Felipe Guimarães	Hitech Racing	0
2	(Brazil) Raphael Raucci	R&R Weissach	4
3	(Brazil) Artur Fortunato	Cesário Fórmula	8
4	(Brazil) Leandro Florenzo	Capital Motorsport	8
5	(Russia) Dzhon Simonyan	Cesário Fórmula	9
6	(Brazil) Fernando Galera	Prop Car	10
7	(Brazil) Victor Franzoni	Hitech Racing	10
8	(Brazil) Victor Miranda	R&R Weissach	12
9	(United States) Nicolas Silva	EMB Racing	14
10	(Brazil) Lukas Moraes	R&R Weissach	17

=== Pre-final Race (Race 3) ===
Pos	No.	Driver	Class	Team	Laps	Time/Retired	Grid
1	66	(Brazil) Felipe Guimarães	A	Hitech Racing	16	30:00.091	1
2	23	(Brazil) Victor Franzoni	A	Hitech Racing	16	1.555	2
3	15	(Brazil) Raphael Raucci	A	R&R Weissach	16	41.946	7
4	17	(Brazil) Fernando Galera	B	Prop Car	16	45.034	6
5	32	(Brazil) Leandro Florenzo	B	Capital Motorsport	16	49.232	9
6	28	(Brazil) Artur Fortunato	B	Cesário Fórmula	16	50.954	4
7	25	(United States) Nicolas Silva	B	EMB Racing	15	1 Lap	8
8	53	(Brazil) Victor Miranda	B	R&R Weissach	15	1 Lap	10
9	8	(Russia) Dzhon Simonyan	A	Cesário Fórmula	15	1 Lap	5
Ret	71	(Brazil) Lukas Moraes	B	R&R Weissach	3	Retired	3
Fastest lap: Victor Franzoni, 1:38.213, 157.946 km/h (98.143 mph) on lap 16

=== Final Race (Race 4) ===
Pos	No.	Driver	Class	Team	Laps	Time/Retired	Grid
1	66	(Brazil) Felipe Guimarães	A	Hitech Racing	20	30:54.450	4
2	23	(Brazil) Victor Franzoni	A	Hitech Racing	20	12.272	7
3	8	(Russia) Dzhon Simonyan	A	Cesário Fórmula	20	12.487	10
4	15	(Brazil) Raphael Raucci	A	R&R Weissach	20	16.520	9
5	28	(Brazil) Artur Fortunato	B	Cesário Fórmula	20	25.914	3
6	71	(Brazil) Lukas Moraes	B	R&R Weissach	20	42.247	2
7	53	(Brazil) Victor Miranda	B	R&R Weissach	20	48.111	8
8	25	(United States) Nicolas Silva	B	EMB Racing	20	1:16.655	5
9	32	(Brazil) Leandro Florenzo	B	Capital Motorsport	19	1 Lap	1
Ret	17	(Brazil) Fernando Galera	B	Prop Car	0	Retired	6
Fastest lap: Felipe Guimarães, 1:31.459, 169.543 km/h (105.349 mph) on lap 2

== See also ==
- Formula 3 Sudamericana
- Fórmula 3 Brasil
- Formula Three
