= 2012 Formula 3 Brazil Open =

Motor racing meeting

Seasons
- ← 2011 2013 →

Autódromo José Carlos Pace

The 2012 Formula 3 Brazil Open was the third Formula 3 Brazil Open race held at Autódromo José Carlos Pace from January 19–22, 2012. For this year the category presents a new regulation about the tyres. Made in Turkey, these compounds were used on main F-3 championships around the world, such as British series.

After a race with accidents, the Brazilian Lucas Foresti of the Cesário Fórmula was crowned his second title. André Negrão competing for the Hitech Racing finished in second place, with class B winner Vinícius Alvarenga finished in third.

== Drivers and teams ==
- All cars are powered by Berta engines, and will run on Pirelli tyres.

2012 Entry List
Team	No	Driver	Class	Chassis
(Brazil) Cesário Fórmula	1	(Brazil) Lucas Foresti	A	Dallara F309
(Brazil) Cesário Fórmula	2	(Brazil) Fabiano Machado	A	Dallara F309
(Brazil) Cesário Fórmula	3	(Brazil) Luís Felipe Derani	A	Dallara F309
(Brazil) Bassan Motorsport	5	(Brazil) Victor Guerin	A	Dallara F309
(United Kingdom) Hitech Racing	7	(Brazil) André Negrão	A	Dallara F309
(United Kingdom) Hitech Racing	8	(Venezuela) Roberto La Rocca	A	Dallara F309
(United Kingdom) Hitech Racing	33	(Brazil) Victor Franzoni	B	Dallara F301
(Brazil) Cesário Fórmula Junior	31	(Brazil) Ricardo Landucci	B	Dallara F301
(Brazil) Cesário Fórmula Junior	32	(Brazil) Higor Hofmann	B	Dallara F301
(Brazil) Dragão Motorsport	37	(Brazil) Vinícius Alvarenga	B	Dallara F301
(Brazil) RR Racing Team	38	(Brazil) Raphael Raucci	B	Dallara F301

Icon	Class
A	Class A
B	Class B

== Classification ==
=== Qualifying ===
Pos	No	Driver	Class	Team	Time
1	1	(Brazil) Lucas Foresti	A	Cesário Fórmula	1:29.378
2	2	(Brazil) Fabiano Machado	A	Cesário Fórmula	1:29.686
3	3	(Brazil) Luís Felipe Derani	A	Cesário Fórmula	1:30.058
4	5	(Brazil) Victor Guerin	A	Bassan Motorsport	1:30.058
5	7	(Brazil) André Negrão	A	Hitech Racing	1:30.549
6	8	(Venezuela) Roberto La Rocca	A	Hitech Racing	1:31.072
7	33	(Brazil) Victor Franzoni	B	Hitech Racing	1:31.621
8	31	(Brazil) Ricardo Landucci	B	Cesário Fórmula Junior	1:31.648
9	32	(Brazil) Higor Hofmann	B	Cesário Fórmula Junior	1:33.748
10	38	(Brazil) Raphael Raucci	B	RR Racing Team	1:33.893
11	37	(Brazil) Vinícius Alvarenga	B	Dragão Motosport	No Time

=== Race 1 ===
Pos	No	Driver	Class	Team	Laps	Time/Retired	Grid
1	1	(Brazil) Lucas Foresti	A	Cesário Fórmula	19	28:53.724	1
2	2	(Brazil) Fabiano Machado	A	Cesário Fórmula	19	+5.281	2
3	3	(Brazil) Luís Felipe Derani	A	Cesário Fórmula	19	+13.690	3
4	5	(Brazil) Victor Guerin	A	Bassan Motorsport	19	+16.428	4
5	8	(Venezuela) Roberto La Rocca	A	Hitech Racing	19	+26.995	6
6	38	(Brazil) Raphael Raucci	B	RR Racing Team	19	+1:15.842	10
7	32	(Brazil) Higor Hofmann	B	Cesário Fórmula Junior	18	+1 Lap	9
8	7	(Brazil) André Negrão	A	Hitech Racing	18	+1 Lap	5
9	31	(Brazil) Ricardo Landucci	B	Cesário Fórmula Junior	15	+4 Laps	8
Ret	33	(Brazil) Victor Franzoni	B	Hitech Racing	5	Retired	7
Ret	37	(Brazil) Vinícius Alvarenga	B	Dragão Motorsport	4	Retired	11
Fastest lap: Lucas Foresti, 1:30.656, 171.112 km/h (106.324 mph) on lap 9

=== Race 2 ===
Pos	No	Driver	Class	Team	Laps	Time/Retired	Grid
1	1	(Brazil) Lucas Foresti	A	Cesário Fórmula	20	30:27.355	1
2	3	(Brazil) Luís Felipe Derani	A	Cesário Fórmula	20	+3.884	3
3	5	(Brazil) Victor Guerin	A	Bassan Motorsport	20	+4.980	4
4	2	(Brazil) Fabiano Machado	A	Cesário Fórmula	20	+5.645	2
5	7	(Brazil) André Negrão	A	Hitech Racing	20	+18.417	5
6	8	(Venezuela) Roberto La Rocca	A	Hitech Racing	20	+45.175	6
7	33	(Brazil) Victor Franzoni	B	Hitech Racing	20	+58.807	7
8	31	(Brazil) Ricardo Landucci	B	Cesário Fórmula Junior	20	+1:11.771	8
9	37	(Brazil) Vinicius Alvarenga	B	Dragão Motorsport	19	+1 Lap	12
10	32	(Brazil) Higor Hofmann	B	Cesário Fórmula Junior	18	+2 Laps	9
Ret	38	(Brazil) Raphael Raucci	B	RR Racing Team	12	Retired	10
Fastest lap: Victor Guerin, 1:30.650, 171.124 km/h (106.332 mph) on lap 10

=== Pre-final Grid ===
Pos	Driver	Team	Points
1	(Brazil) Lucas Foresti	Cesário Fórmula	0
2	(Brazil) Luís Felipe Derani	Cesário Fórmula	3
3	(Brazil) Fabiano Machado	Cesário Fórmula	4
4	(Brazil) Victor Guerin	Bassan Motorsport	5
5	(Venezuela) Roberto La Rocca	Hitech Racing	9
6	(Brazil) André Negrão	Hitech Racing	11
7	(Brazil) Raphael Raucci	RR Racing Team	15
8	(Brazil) Higor Hofmann	Cesário Fórmula Junior	15
9	(Brazil) Ricardo Landucci	Cesário Fórmula Junior	15
10	(Brazil) Victor Franzoni	Hitech Racing	15
11	(Brazil) Vinícius Alvarenga	Dragão Motorsport	18

=== Pre-final Race ===
Pos	No	Driver	Class	Team	Laps	Time/Retired	Grid
1	1	(Brazil) Lucas Foresti	A	Cesário Fórmula	16	30:27.749	1
2	8	(Venezuela) Roberto La Rocca	A	Hitech Racing	16	+16.195	5
3	7	(Brazil) André Negrão	A	Hitech Racing	16	+20.373	6
4	31	(Brazil) Ricardo Landucci	B	Cesário Fórmula Junior	16	+25.750	9
5	33	(Brazil) Victor Franzoni	B	Hitech Racing	16	+27.192	10
6	5	(Brazil) Victor Guerin^{1}	A	Bassan Motorsport	16	+33.800	3
7	38	(Brazil) Raphael Raucci	B	RR Racing Team	16	+38.834	7
8	2	(Brazil) Fabiano Machado	A	[Cesário Fórmula	16	+1:10.564	4
Ret	37	(Brazil) Vinícius Alvarenga	B	Dragão Motorsport	10	Retired	11
Ret	32	(Brazil) Higor Hofmann	B	Cesário Fórmula Junior	5	Retired	8
Ret	3	(Brazil) Luís Felipe Derani	A	Cesário Fórmula	1	Retired	2
Fastest lap: Lucas Foresti, 1:30.790, 170.860 km/h (106.167 mph) on lap 10

Notes
1. – Guerin was penalized with 20 seconds for false start.

=== Final Race ===
Pos	No	Driver	Class	Team	Laps	Time/Retired	Grid
1	1	(Brazil) Lucas Foresti	A	Cesário Fórmula	16	20:20.441	1
3	2	(Brazil) André Negrão	A	Hitech Racing	16	+9.648	3
3	37	(Brazil) Vinícius Alvarenga	B	Dragão Motorsport	16	+25.158	9
4	38	(Brazil) Raphael Raucci	B	RR Racing Team	16	+26.485	7
Ret	3	(Brazil) Luís Felipe Derani	A	Cesário Fórmula	8	Retired	11
Ret	5	(Brazil) Victor Guerin	A	Bassan Motorsport	8	Retired	6
Ret	33	(Brazil) Victor Franzoni	B	Hitech Racing	7	Retired	5
Ret	32	(Brazil) Higor Hofmann	B	Cesário Fórmula Junior	6	Retired	10
Ret	2	(Brazil) Fabiano Machado	A	Cesário Fórmula	6	Retired	8
Ret	31	(Brazil) Ricardo Landucci	B	Cesário Fórmula Junior	6	Retired	4
Ret	8	(Venezuela) Roberto La Rocca	A	Hitech Racing	3	Retired	2
Fastest lap: Lucas Foresti, 1:30.270, 171.844 km/h (106.779 mph) on lap 4

== See also ==
- Formula Three Sudamericana
- Formula Three
