= 2011 Formula 3 Brazil Open =

Seasons
- ← 2010 2012 →

Autódromo José Carlos Pace

The 2011 Formula 3 Brazil Open was the second Formula 3 Brazil Open race held at Autódromo José Carlos Pace from January 20–23, 2011.

After perfect weekend of competition, the Brazilian Lucas Foresti of the Cesário Fórmula was crowned champion ahead of Yann Cunha competing for the Bassan Motorsport, Foresti team-mate Victor Guerin finished in third place. In Class B the Brazilian Raphael Abbatte was the winner.

== Drivers and teams ==
- All cars are powered by Berta engines, and will run on Pirelli tyres. All teams were Brazilian-registered.

2011 Entry List
Team	No	Driver	Class	Chassis
Hitech Racing Brazil	1	(Brazil) Luís Felipe Derani	A	Dallara F309
Hitech Racing Brazil	2	(Brazil) Guilherme Silva	A	Dallara F309
Cesário Fórmula	3	(Brazil) Lucas Foresti	A	Dallara F309
Cesário Fórmula	4	(Brazil) Fabiano Machado	A	Dallara F309
Cesário Fórmula	11	(Brazil) Victor Guerin	A	Dallara F309
Kemba Racing	9	(Brazil) João Jardim	A	Dallara F309
Bassan Motorsport	15	(Brazil) Yann Cunha	A	Dallara F309
Cesário Fórmula Jr.	31	(Brazil) Bruno Bonifacio	B	Dallara F301
Cesário Fórmula Jr.	32	(Brazil) Raphael Abbate	B	Dallara F301

Icon	Class
A	Class A
B	Class B

== Classification ==
=== Qualifying ===
Pos	No	Driver	Class	Team	Time
1	3	(Brazil) Lucas Foresti	A	Cesário Fórmula	1:31.039
2	15	(Brazil) Yann Cunha	A	Bassan Motorsport	1:31.100
3	2	(Brazil) Guilherme Silva	A	Hitech Racing Brazil	1:31.475
4	4	(Brazil) Fabiano Machado	A	Cesário Fórmula	1:31.650
5	9	(Brazil) João Jardim	A	Kemba Racing	1:31.736
6	1	(Brazil) Luís Felipe Derani	A	Hitech Racing Brazil	1:31.893
7	11	(Brazil) Victor Guerin	A	Cesário Fórmula	1:32.030
8	31	(Brazil) Bruno Bonifacio	B	Cesário Fórmula Jr.	1:32.114
9	32	(Brazil) Raphael Abbate	B	Cesário Fórmula Jr.	1:32.342

=== Race 1 ===
Pos	No	Driver	Class	Team	Laps	Time/Retired	Grid
1	3	(Brazil) Lucas Foresti	A	Cesário Fórmula	19	31:18.751	1
2	4	(Brazil) Fabiano Machado	A	Cesário Fórmula	19	+16.288	4
3	1	(Brazil) Luís Felipe Derani	A	Hitech Racing Brazil	19	+19.945	6
4	11	(Brazil) Victor Guerin	A	Cesário Fórmula	19	+22.045	7
5	15	(Brazil) Yann Cunha	A	Bassan Motorsport	19	+53.350	2
6	31	(Brazil) Bruno Bonifacio	B	Cesário Fórmula Jr.	18	+1 lap	8
7	2	(Brazil) Guilherme Silva	A	Hitech Racing Brazil	18	+1 Lap	3
8	32	(Brazil) Raphael Abbate	B	Cesário Fórmula Jr.	18	+1 Lap	9
9	9	(Brazil) João Jardim	A	Kemba Racing	18	+1 Lap	5
Fastest lap: Lucas Foresti, 1:31.111, 170.258 km/h (105.793 mph) on lap 7

=== Race 2 ===
Pos	No	Driver	Class	Team	Laps	Time/Retired	Grid
1	3	(Brazil) Lucas Foresti	A	Cesário Fórmula	20	30:47.476	1
2	15	(Brazil) Yann Cunha	A	Bassan Motorsport	20	+4.385	2
3	1	(Brazil) Luís Felipe Derani	A	Hitech Racing Brazil	20	+24.286	6
4	4	(Brazil) Fabiano Machado	A	Cesário Fórmula	20	+24.842	4
5	11	(Brazil) Victor Guerin	A	Cesário Fórmula	20	+25.634	7
6	9	(Brazil) João Jardim	A	Kemba Racing	20	+29.770	5
7	2	(Brazil) Guilherme Silva	A	Hitech Racing Brazil	20	+35. 745	3
8	32	(Brazil) Raphael Abbate	B	Cesário Fórmula Jr.	20	+38.319	9
9	31	(Brazil) Bruno Bonifacio	B	Cesário Fórmula Jr.	20	+40. 191	8
Fastest lap: Yann Cunha, 1:31.587, 169.373 km/h (105.244 mph) on lap 9

=== Pre-final Grid ===
Pos	Driver	Team	Points
1	(Brazil) Lucas Foresti	Cesário Fórmula	0
2	(Brazil) Fabiano Machado	Cesário Fórmula	4
3	(Brazil) Luís Felipe Derani	Hitech Racing Brazil	4
4	(Brazil) Yann Cunha	Bassan Motorsport	5
5	(Brazil) Victor Guerin	Cesário Fórmula	7
6	(Brazil) Guilherme Silva	Hitech Racing Brazil	12
7	(Brazil) Bruno Bonifacio	Cesário Fórmula Jr.	13
8	(Brazil) João Jardim	Kemba Racing	13
9	(Brazil) Raphael Abbate	Cesário Fórmula Jr.	14

=== Pre-final Race ===
Pos	No	Driver	Class	Team	Laps	Time/Retired	Grid
1	3	(Brazil) Lucas Foresti	A	Cesário Fórmula	16	30:47.476	1
2	11	(Brazil) Victor Guerin	A	Cesário Fórmula	16	+13.804	5
3	4	(Brazil) Fabiano Machado	A	Cesário Fórmula	16	+13.994	2
4	2	(Brazil) Guilherme Silva	A	Hitech Racing Brazil	16	+17.751	6
5	32	(Brazil) Raphael Abbate	B	Cesário Fórmula Jr.	16	+23.134	9
6	15	(Brazil) Yann Cunha	A	Bassan Motorsport	12	+4 Laps	4
Ret	31	(Brazil) Bruno Bonifacio	B	Cesário Fórmula Jr.	11	Retired	7
Ret	1	(Brazil) Luís Felipe Derani	A	Hitech Racing Brazil	10	Retired	3
Ret	9	(Brazil) João Jardim	A	Kemba Racing	0	Retired	8
Fastest lap: Lucas Foresti, 1:32.258, 168,141 km/h (104,478 mph) on lap 13

=== Final Race ===
Pos	No	Driver	Class	Team	Laps	Time/Retired	Grid
1	3	(Brazil) Lucas Foresti	A	Cesário Fórmula	20	30:43.140	1
2	15	(Brazil) Yann Cunha	A	Bassan Motorsport	20	+5. 010	6
3	11	(Brazil) Victor Guerin	A	Cesário Fórmula	20	+12.534	2
4	4	(Brazil) Fabiano Machado	A	Cesário Fórmula	20	+12.956	3
5	32	(Brazil) Raphael Abbate	B	Cesário Fórmula Jr.	20	+32. 194	5
6	2	(Brazil) Guilherme Silva	A	Hitech Racing Brazil	20	+34.406	4
7	31	(Brazil) Bruno Bonifacio	B	Cesário Fórmula Jr.	20	+43.347	7
Ret	1	(Brazil) Luís Felipe Derani	A	Hitech Racing Brazil	14	Retired	8
Ret	9	(Brazil) João Jardim	A	Kemba Racing	3	Retired	9
Fastest lap: Lucas Foresti, 1:31.492, 169,492 km/h (105,317 mph) on lap 6

== See also ==
- Formula Three Sudamericana
- Formula Three
