= Yann Cunha =

Brazilian racing driver

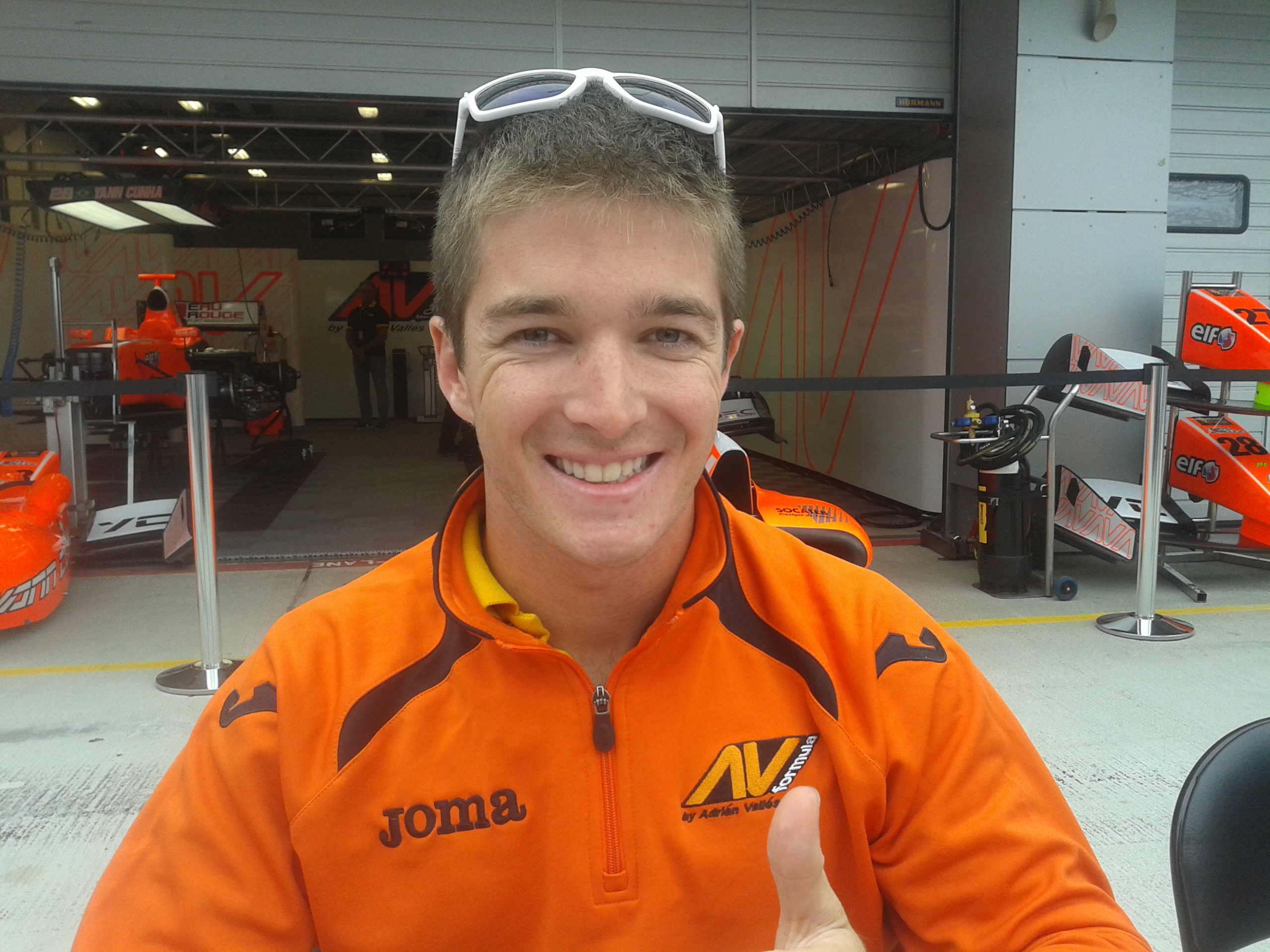
- Cunha in 2013
- Nationality: (Brazil) Brazilian
- Born: Yann Sainpy da Silva Cunha; 22 January 1991 (age 35) Brasília, DF, Brazil

Previous series
- 2012-13 2011 2011 2008-10: Formula Renault 3.5 Series; European F3 Open Championship; British Formula 3 Formula 3 Sudamericana

Yann Sainpy da Silva Cunha (born 22 January 1991) is a Brazilian former racing driver.

== Career ==
=== Karting ===
Cunha began his career kart racing. In November 2010, Cunha, teamed up with pilots Luiz Cordeiro and Lu Boesel, won the famous 500 miles kart race in Granja Viana, São Paulo, where celebrities such as Nelson Piquet Jr. and Rubens Barrichello participated as well.

=== Formula Three Sudamericana ===
In 2008 he began competing in the fastest category of the continent, the South American Formula 3.

In his first season, Cunha participated in only a few races, and started preparing for the 2009 season. 2009 was his first full year of racing. At eighteen, he worked with the team Razia Sports to develop the new Dallara F309, which now equips the cars of that class. Cunha placed second in the opening round of the competition, held in Brasília. Cunha raced a variety of circuits in 2009, he raced in his home town of Brasília but also the circuits of Curitiba, Rio de Janeiro, Santa Cruz do Sul, Buenos Aires (Argentina), Piriápolis (Uruguay), São Paulo and Campo Grande. Cunha appeared on the podium for these races and was confirmed the best rookie in Formula 3.

== Racing record ==
=== Career summary ===
Season	Series	Team name	Races	Poles	Wins	F/Laps	Podiums	Points	Position
2008	Formula 3 Sudamericana	Razia Sports	6	0	0	0	0	0	21st
2009	Formula 3 Sudamericana	Razia Sports	18	0	0	1	8	75	5th
2010	Formula 3 Brazil Open	Bassan Motorsport	1	0	0	0	1	N/A	**3rd**
2010	Formula 3 Sudamericana	Bassan Motorsport	24	7	5	4	16	351	**2nd**
2010	British Formula 3	CF Racing with Manor Motorsport	3	0	0	0	0	0	21st
2010	Formula Renault UK	CRS Racing	2	0	0	0	0	10	31st
2011	Formula 3 Brazil Open	Bassan Motorsport	1	0	0	0	1	N/A	**2nd**
2011	British Formula 3	T-Sport	30	0	0	0	0	-36	26th
2011	European F3 Open Championship	Hache Team	10	0	1	1	3	44	9th
2012	Formula Renault 3.5 Series	Pons Racing	17	0	0	0	0	0	29th
2012	Auto GP World Series	Ombra Racing	4	0	0	0	0	8	18th
2013	Formula Renault 3.5 Series	AV Formula	17	0	0	0	0	0	27th

=== Complete Auto GP World Series results ===
(key)

Year	Entrant	1	2	3	4	5	6	7	8	9	10	11	12	13	14	Pos	Points
2012	Ombra Racing	MNZ; 1	MNZ; 2	VAL; 1; 13	VAL; 2 Ret	MAR; 1; 9	MAR; 2; 6	HUN; 1	HUN; 2	ALG; 1	ALG; 2	CUR; 1	CUR; 2	SON; 1	SON; 2	18th	8

=== Complete Formula Renault 3.5 Series results ===
(key) (Races in bold indicate pole position) (Races in italics indicate fastest lap)

Year	Team	1	2	3	4	5	6	7	8	9	10	11	12	13	14	15	16	17	Pos	Points
2012	Pons Racing	ALC; 1; 15	ALC; 2 Ret	MON; 1 Ret	SPA; 1; 17	SPA; 2; 11	NÜR; 1; 17	NÜR; 2 Ret	MSC; 1; 19	MSC; 2 Ret	SIL; 1 Ret	SIL; 2 Ret	HUN; 1; 22	HUN; 2; 21	LEC; 1; 21	LEC; 2; 19	CAT; 1; 23	CAT; 2; 21	29th	0
2013	AV Formula	MNZ; 1 Ret	MNZ; 2; 15	ALC; 1; 15	ALC; 2; 13	MON; 1; 18	SPA; 1 Ret	SPA; 2 Ret	MSC; 1; 19	MSC; 2 Ret	RBR; 1; 15	RBR; 2; 12	HUN; 1 Ret	HUN; 2; 21	LEC; 1 Ret	LEC; 2 Ret	CAT; 1 Ret	CAT; 2; 19	27th	0
