= 2013 Formula 3 Brazil Open =

Seasons
- ← 2012 2014 →

Autódromo José Carlos Pace

The 2013 Formula 3 Brazil Open was the fourth Formula 3 Brazil Open race held at Autódromo José Carlos Pace from January 17–20, 2013.

Despite having started the race in last place, Felipe Guimarães won the event.

== Drivers and teams ==
- All cars are powered by Berta engines, and will run on Pirelli tyres.

2013 Entry List
Team	No	Driver	Class	Chassis
(United Kingdom) Hitech Racing	4	(Venezuela) Roberto La Rocca	A	Dallara F309
(United Kingdom) Hitech Racing	5	(Brazil) Felipe Guimarães	A	Dallara F309
(United Kingdom) Hitech Racing	6	(Russia) Dmitry Suranovich	A	Dallara F309
(Brazil) RR Racing Team	15	(Brazil) Raphael Raucci	A	Dallara F309
(Brazil) Capital Motorsport	26	(Brazil) Eduardo Banzoli	B	Dallara F301
(Brazil) Cesário F3	31	(Brazil) Gustavo Lima	B	Dallara F301

Icon	Class
A	Class A
B	Class B

== Classification ==
=== Qualifying ===
Pos	No	Driver	Class	Team	Time
1	5	(Brazil) Felipe Guimarães	A	Hitech Racing	1:34.133
2	4	(Venezuela) Roberto La Rocca	A	Hitech Racing	1:35.097
3	26	(Brazil) Eduardo Banzoli	B	Capital Motorsport	1:35.376
4	15	(Brazil) Raphael Raucci	A	RR Racing Team	1:35.669
5	6	(Russia) Dmitry Suranovich	A	Hitech Racing	1:35.975
6	31	(Brazil) Gustavo Lima	B	Cesário Fórmula Jr.	1:37.763

=== Race 1 ===
Pos	No	Driver	Class	Team	Laps	Time/Retired	Grid
1	5	(Brazil) Felipe Guimarães	A	Hitech Racing	16	30:45.888	1
2	4	(Venezuela) Roberto La Rocca	A	Hitech Racing	16	+3.921	2
3	6	(Russia) Dmitry Suranovich	A	Hitech Racing	16	+1:05.230	5
4	31	(Brazil) Gustavo Lima	B	Cesário F3	13	+3 laps	6
Ret	26	(Brazil) Eduardo Banzoli	B	Capital Motorsport	11	Retired	3
Ret	15	(Brazil) Raphael Raucci	A	RR Racing Team	6	Retired	4
Fastest lap: Roberto La Rocca, 1:53.171, 137.070 km/h (85.171 mph) on lap 16

=== Race 2 ===
Pos	No	Driver	Class	Team	Laps	Time/Retired	Grid
1	4	(Venezuela) Roberto La Rocca	A	Hitech Racing	19	30:40.592	2
2	15	(Brazil) Raphael Raucci	A	RR Racing Team	19	+33.354	6
3	31	(Brazil) Gustavo Lima	B	Cesário F3	19	+38.030	4
4	6	(Russia) Dmitry Suranovich	A	Hitech Racing	19	+46.882	3
5	5	(Brazil) Felipe Guimarães	A	Hitech Racing	14	+5 laps	1
Ret	26	(Brazil) Eduardo Banzoli	B	Capital Motorsport	9	Retired	5
Fastest lap: Felipe Guimarães 1:35.264, 137.070 km/h (85.171 mph) on lap 6

=== Pre-final Grid ===
Pos	Driver	Team	Points
1	(Venezuela) Roberto La Rocca	Hitech Racing	1
2	(Brazil) Felipe Guimarães	Hitech Racing	4
3	(Russia) Dmitry Suranovich	Hitech Racing	5
4	(Brazil) Gustavo Lima	Cesário F3	5
5	(Brazil) Raphael Raucci	RR Racing Team	6
6	(Brazil) Eduardo Banzoli	Capital Motorsport	9

=== Pre-final Race ===
Pos	No	Driver	Class	Team	Laps	Time/Retired	Grid
1	4	(Venezuela) Roberto La Rocca	A	Hitech Racing	19	30:55.156	1
2	26	(Brazil) Eduardo Banzoli	B	Capital Motorsport	19	+29.169	6
3	31	(Brazil) Gustavo Lima	B	Cesário F3	19	+33.288	4
4	15	(Brazil) Raphael Raucci	A	RR Racing Team	19	+47.301	5
5	6	(Russia) Dmitry Suranovich	A	Hitech Racing	17	+2 laps	3
Ret	5	(Brazil) Felipe Guimarães	A	Hitech Racing	0	Retired	2
Fastest lap: Roberto La Rocca 1:36.529, 160.701 km/h (99.855 mph) on lap 17

=== Final Race ===
Pos	No	Driver	Class	Team	Laps	Time/Retired	Grid
1	5	(Brazil) Felipe Guimarães	A	Hitech Racing	19	31:16.716	6
2	6	(Russia) Dmitry Suranovich	A	Hitech Racing	19	+1:15.536	5
3	26	(Brazil) Eduardo Banzoli	B	Capital Motorsport	18	+1 lap	2
4	4	(Venezuela) Roberto La Rocca	A	Hitech Racing	14	+5 laps	1
Ret	15	(Brazil) Raphael Raucci	A	RR Racing Team	13	Retired	4
Ret	31	(Brazil) Gustavo Lima	B	Cesário F3	3	Retired	3
Fastest lap: Felipe Guimarães 1:34.557, 164.053 km/h (101.938 mph) on lap 13

== See also ==
- Formula Three Sudamericana
- Formula Three
