= Lucas Foresti =

Brazilian racing driver (born 1992)

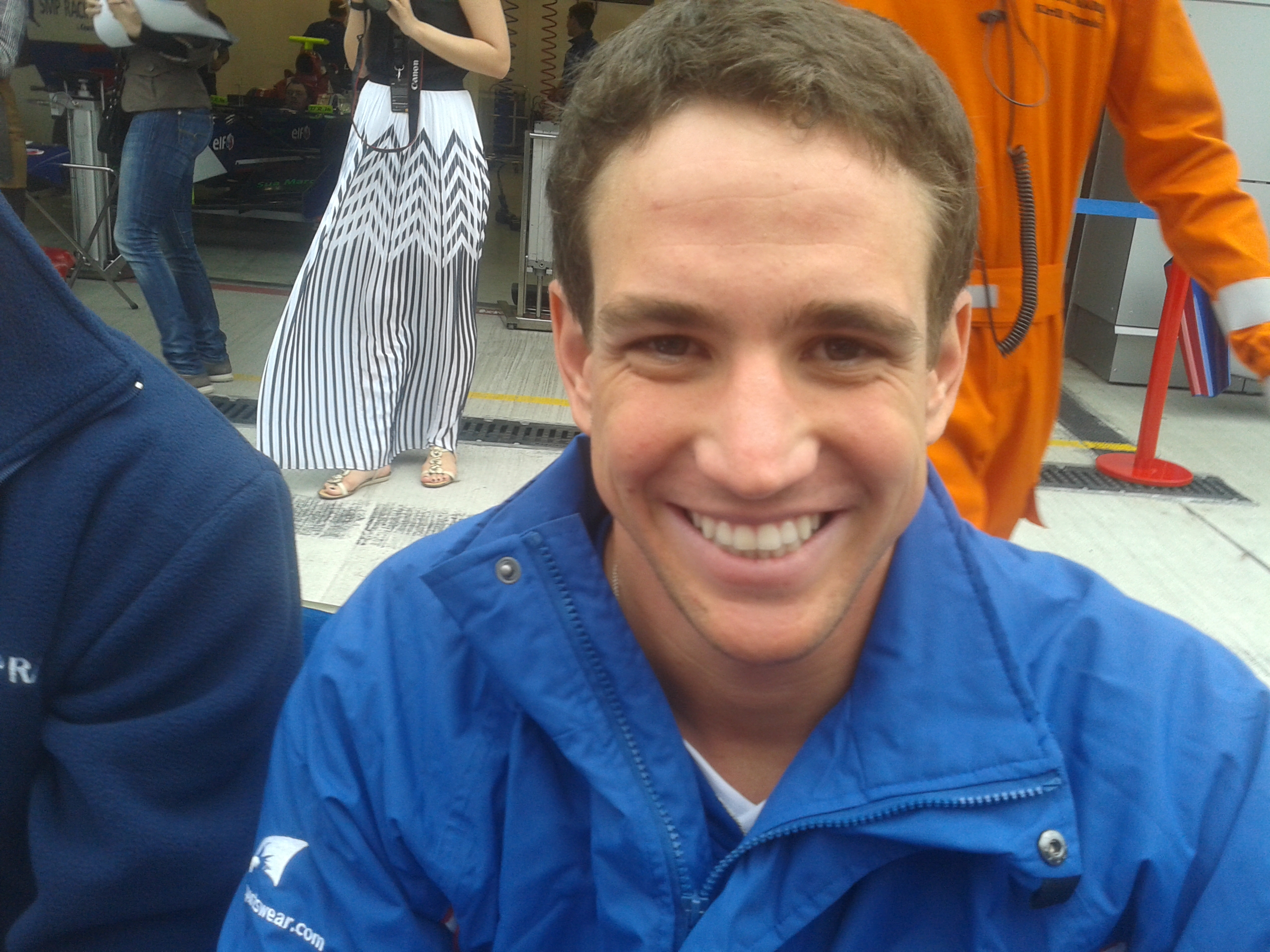
- Foresti in 2013
- Nationality: Brazilian
- Born: Lucas Constantino Bethonico Foresti; 12 May 1992 (age 34) Brasília, DF, Brazil

Formula Renault 3.5 Series career
- Debut season: 2012
- Current team: SMP Racing by Comtec
- Categorisation: FIA Gold
- Car number: 16
- Former teams: DAMS
- Starts: 33
- Wins: 0
- Poles: 0
- Fastest laps: 1
- Best finish: 23rd in 2012

Previous series
- 2010–11 2010 2009 2008: British Formula 3 Toyota Racing Series; Formula 3 Sudamericana; Formula BMW Americas

Lucas Constantino Bethonico Foresti (born 12 May 1992) is a Brazilian racing driver who currently competes in Stock Car Brasil for KTF Sports.

== Career ==
=== Karting ===
After a previous career in junior motocross, Foresti made his karting debut at Brasília's Kartodromo Waltinho Ferrari in June 2006, where he finished in fourth position in the Novice category. He moved into karting full-time in 2007, and immediately won four different state championships as a rookie. Competing in a Birel Sudam for Dibo Racing, Foresti won state championships in Super Centro-Oeste, Brasília, Goiânia and Minas Gerais, with second-place finishes overall in Brazil and in the Open Masters SP. Moving into the Graduate B class in 2008, Foresti again won regional championships in the same regions except Minas Gerais; also adding a second-place finish at the 500 Milhas de Granja Viana for Piquet Sports.

=== Formula Three ===
After competing in the 2008 Brazilian Grand Prix-supporting Formula BMW Americas rounds for Amir Nasr Racing, Foresti moved into the Formula Three Sudamericana in 2009, driving for Cesario Fórmula. Foresti finished third in the championship, achieving a single pole position and victory at Autódromo Internacional Orlando Moura in Campo Grande.

Foresti had been due to drive for Hitech Racing in the 2010 British Formula 3 Championship, but shortly before the season, he moved across to Carlin as part of a six-car challenge by the team.

=== GP3 Series ===
Foresti also contested the opening rounds of the inaugural GP3 Series for Carlin.

=== Stock Car Brasil ===
Foresti started his participation in the Brazilian Stock Car Championship in 2013, running the two final races. In the following year, he competed in his first full season for Bassani Racing team. In 2015, Foresti moved to AMG Motorsport in order to accomplish his first win in the Curitiba GP on 18 October.

== Racing record ==
=== Career summary ===
Season	Series	Team	Races	Wins	Poles	F/Laps	Podiums	Points	Position
2008	Formula BMW Americas	Amir Nasr Racing	2	0	0	0	0	6	13th
2009	Formula 3 Sudamericana	Cesário Fórmula	17	1	1	1	7	81	**3rd**
2010	British Formula 3 International Series	Carlin	30	0	0	0	1	45	13th
2010	GP3 Series	Carlin	10	0	0	0	1	7	19th
2010	Masters of Formula 3	Carlin	1	0	0	0	0	N/A	7th
2010	Toyota Racing Series	Giles Motorsport	12	1	0	1	3	536	8th
2010	Formula 3 Sudamericana	Cesário Fórmula	7	3	0	2	5	128	8th
2010	Macau Grand Prix	Fortec Motorsport	1	0	0	0	0	N/A	22nd
2011	British Formula 3 International Series	Fortec Motorsport	30	3	1	2	7	170	7th
2011	Macau Grand Prix	Fortec Motorsport	1	0	0	0	0	N/A	7th
2011	Masters of Formula 3	Mucke Motorsport	1	0	0	0	0	N/A	8th
2011	Formula 3 Brazil Open	Cesário Fórmula	1	1	1	1	1	N/A	**1st**
2012	Formula Renault 3.5 Series	DAMS	17	0	0	0	0	8	23rd
2012	Formula 3 Brazil Open	Cesário Fórmula	1	1	1	1	1	N/A	**1st**
2013	Formula Renault 3.5 Series	SMP Racing by Comtec	16	0	0	0	0	0	26th
2013	Stock Car Brasil	RC3 Bassani	2	0	0	0	0	0	NC
2014	Stock Car Brasil	RC3 Bassani	20	0	0	0	0	42.5	28th
2015	Stock Car Brasil	AMG Motorsport	19	1	0	2	1	53	26th
2016	Stock Car Brasil	Full Time-ProGP	21	0	1	0	0	67	24th
2017	Stock Car Brasil	Full Time Academy	21	0	0	0	1	37	27th
2018	Stock Car Brasil	Cimed Racing Team	21	0	0	0	0	49	19th
2019	Stock Car Brasil	Vogel Motorsport	21	0	0	1	1	110	20th
2020	Stock Car Brasil	Vogel Motorsport	17	0	0	0	0	87	22nd
2021	Stock Car Brasil	KTF Sports	23	1	0	2	1	113	21st
2022	Stock Car Pro Series	KTF Sports	23	0	0	0	0	75	28th
2023	Stock Car Pro Series	A.Mattheis Vogel	24	0	0	1	1	151	19th
2024	Stock Car Pro Series	A.Mattheis Vogel	24	0	0	0	1	612	15th
2024	TCR South America Touring Car Championship	W2 ProGP	1	1	0	1	1	47	27th
2024	TCR Brazil Touring Car Championship	W2 ProGP	1	1	0	1	1	47	16th
2025	Stock Car Pro Series	A.Mattheis Vogel	23	0	0	0	2	566	11th
2026	Stock Car Pro Series	A.Mattheis Vogel	19	0	0	0	0	309	24th*

^{*} Season still in progress.

=== Complete GP3 Series results ===
(key) (Races in bold indicate pole position) (Races in italics indicate fastest lap)

Year	Entrant	1	2	3	4	5	6	7	8	9	10	11	12	13	14	15	16	DC	Points
2010	Carlin	CAT; FEA; 7	CAT; SPR; 2	IST; FEA	IST; SPR	VAL; FEA; 21	VAL; SPR; 28	SIL; FEA; 18	SIL; SPR; 16	HOC; FEA; Ret	HOC; SPR; 14	HUN; FEA	HUN; SPR	SPA; FEA	SPA; SPR	MNZ; FEA; 20	MNZ; SPR; Ret	19th	7

=== Complete Formula Renault 3.5 Series results ===
(key) (Races in bold indicate pole position) (Races in italics indicate fastest lap)

Year	Team	1	2	3	4	5	6	7	8	9	10	11	12	13	14	15	16	17	Pos	Points
2012	DAMS	ALC; 1; 11	ALC; 2 Ret	MON; 1; 17	SPA; 1 Ret	SPA; 2 Ret	NÜR; 1 Ret	NÜR; 2; 10	MSC; 1; 18†	MSC; 2; 14	SIL; 1; 7	SIL; 2; 18	HUN; 1; 11	HUN; 2; 13	LEC; 1; 14	LEC; 2; 10	CAT; 1 Ret	CAT; 2 Ret	23rd	8
2013	SMP Racing by Comtec	MNZ; 1 Ret	MNZ; 2 Ret	ALC; 1; 14	ALC; 2; 16	MON; 1; 16	SPA; 1; 22	SPA; 2 Ret	MSC; 1 Ret	MSC; 2 DNS	RBR; 1; 12	RBR; 2; 21†	HUN; 1; 14	HUN; 2; 17	LEC; 1 Ret	LEC; 2; 17	CAT; 1; 11	CAT; 2; 15	26th	0

^{†} Did not finish, but was classified as he had completed more than 90% of the race distance.

=== Complete Stock Car Pro Series results ===
(key) (Races in bold indicate pole position) (Races in italics indicate fastest lap)

Year	Team	Car	1	2	3	4	5	6	7	8	9	10	11	12	13	14	15	16	17	18	19	20	21	22	23	24	25	Pos	Points
2013	RC3 Bassani	Peugeot 408	INT	CUR	TAR	SAL	BRA	CAS	RBP	CAS	VEL	CUR	BRA; Ret	INT; 23														NC	0
2014	RC3 Bassani	Peugeot 408	INT; 1; 20	SCZ; 1; 25	SCZ; 2; 12	BRA; 1; 27	BRA; 2; 10	GOI; 1; 14	GOI; 2; 14	INT; 1; 14	CAS; 1 Ret	CAS; 2; 21	CUR; 1; 16	CUR; 2; 13	VEL; 1; 21	VEL; 2; 22	SAL; 1; 11	SAL; 2; 10	CUR; 1; 29	CUR; 2; 25	TAR; 1 Ret	TAR; 2 DNS	BRA; 1 Ret					28th	42.5
2015	TMG Racing	Chevrolet Sonic	GOI; 1; 15	RBP; 1 Ret	RBP; 2 Ret	VEL; 1; 20	VEL; 2; 15	CUR; 1 Ret	CUR; 2; 4	SCZ; 1 Ret	SCZ; 2 Ret	CUR; 1; 15	CUR; 2; 15	GOI; 1; 13	CAS; 1; 18	CAS; 2; 18	MOU; 1 Ret	MOU; 2 DNS	CUR; 1; 1	CUR; 2; 18	TAR; 1; 22	TAR; 2 Ret	INT; 1					26th	53
2016	Full Time-ProGP	Chevrolet Cruze	CUR; 1; 8	VEL; 1; 19	VEL; 2; 19	GOI; 1 Ret	GOI; 2 Ret	SCZ; 1; 12	SCZ; 2; 11	TAR; 1; 9	TAR; 2; 20	CAS; 1 Ret	CAS; 2; 20†	INT; 1 Ret	LON; 1 Ret	LON; 2 Ret	CUR; 1; 7	CUR; 2 Ret	GOI; 1; 10	**GOI**; **2**; 22	CDC; 1 Ret	CDC; 2 Ret	INT; 1; 20					24th	67
2017	Full Time Academy	Chevrolet Cruze	GOI; 1; 15	GOI; 2; 19	VEL; 1; 21	VEL; 2 Ret	SCZ; 1; 11	SCZ; 2; 15	CAS; 1; 23	CAS; 2; 2	CUR; 1; 26	CRI; 1 Ret	CRI; 2 DNS	VCA; 1; 15	VCA; 2; 22	LON; 1; 27	LON; 2 Ret	ARG; 1; 24	ARG; 2 Ret	TAR; 1; 14	TAR; 2; 21	GOI; 1 Ret	GOI; 2; 7	INT; 1; 27				27th	37
2018	Cimed-ProGP	Chevrolet Cruze	INT; 1; 10	CUR; 1 Ret	CUR; 2 DSQ	VEL; 1; 6	VEL; 2; 17	LON; 1; 20	LON; 2; 15	SCZ; 1; 6	SCZ; 2 Ret	GOI; 1; 13	MOU; 1; 16	MOU; 2 Ret	CAS; 1; 9	CAS; 2; 17	VCA; 1; 14	VCA; 2; 17	TAR; 1 Ret	TAR; 2; 20	GOI; 1; 17	GOI; 2; 18	INT; 1; 15					19th	49
2019	Vogel Motorsport	Chevrolet Cruze	VEL; 1; 18	VCA; 1; 10	VCA; 2; 20	GOI; 1; 12	GOI; 2; 16	LON; 1; 13	LON; 2 Ret	SCZ; 1; 10	SCZ; 2 Ret	MOU; 1; 21	MOU; 2; 11	INT; 1; 18	VEL; 1; 12	VEL; 2; 8	CAS; 1 Ret	CAS; 2; 16	VCA; 1; 19	VCA; 2; 21	GOI; 1; 3	GOI; 2; 21	INT; 1 DSQ					20th	110
2020	Vogel Motorsport	Chevrolet Cruze	GOI; 1; 15	GOI; 2 Ret	INT; 1; 11	INT; 2; 14	LON; 1; 15	LON; 2; 18	CAS; 1; 17	CAS; 2; 12	CAS; 3; 14	VCA; 1; 13	VCA; 2; 13	CUR; 1 Ret	CUR; 2 Ret	CUR; 3; 10	GOI; 1 Ret	GOI; 2 DNS	GOI; 3; 13	INT; 1 Ret								22nd	87
2021	KTF Sports	Chevrolet Cruze	GOI; 1; 10	GOI; 2; 12	INT; 1; 29	INT; 2 Ret	VCA; 1; 17	VCA; 2; 1	VCA; 1; 27	VCA; 2 Ret	CAS; 1; 24	CAS; 2; 26	CUR; 1; 12	CUR; 2 Ret	CUR; 1; 21	CUR; 2; 15	GOI; 1 Ret	GOI; 2 DNS	GOI; 1; 13	GOI; 2; 17	VCA; 1; 14	VCA; 2; 10	SCZ; 1; 8	SCZ; 2; 18	INT; 1; 24	INT; 2 Ret		21st	113
2022	KTF Sports	Chevrolet Cruze	INT; 1; 24	GOI; 1; 26	GOI; 2; 21	RIO; 1; 25	RIO; 2 Ret	VCA; 1 Ret	VCA; 2; 15	VEL; 1; 26	VEL; 2; 20	VEL; 1; 9	VEL; 2 DNS	INT; 1; 11	INT; 2; 15	VCA; 1; 13	VCA; 2; 20	SCZ; 1; 13	SCZ; 2; 8	GOI; 1; 16	GOI; 2; 21	GOI; 1; 22	GOI; 2 Ret	INT; 1; 19	INT; 2 Ret			28th	75
2023	AMattheis Vogel	Chevrolet Cruze	GOI; 1; 13	GOI; 2; 14	INT; 1; 19	INT; 2; 12	TAR; 1; 17	TAR; 2 Ret	CAS; 1; 7	CAS; 2; 19	INT; 1; 14	INT; 2; 18	VCA; 1 DSQ	VCA; 2; 12	GOI; 1; 3	GOI; 2; 13	VEL; 1; 9	VEL; 2; 21	BUE; 1; 23	BUE; 2; 17	VCA; 1; 13	VCA; 2; 21	CAS; 1; 10	CAS; 2; 6	INT; 1; 12	INT; 2 Ret		19th	151
2024	AMattheis Vogel	Chevrolet Cruze	GOI; 1; 8	GOI; 2; 5	VCA; 1; 19	VCA; 2 C	INT; 1; 13	INT; 2; 17	CAS; 1; 4	CAS; 2; 15	VCA; 1; 21	VCA; 2; 22	VCA; 3; 20	GOI; 1; 20	GOI; 2; 11	BLH; 1; 20	BLH; 2; 12	VEL; 1; 15	VEL; 2; 15	BUE; 1; 16	BUE; 2; 15	URU; 1; 3	URU; 2; 11	GOI; 1; 9	GOI; 2; 5	INT; 1; 11	INT; 2; 21	15th	612
2025	AMattheis Vogel	Chevrolet Tracker	INT; 1; 5	CAS; 1; 17	CAS; 2; 18	VEL; 1; 7	VEL; 2 Ret	VCA; 1; 12	VCA; 2; 6	CRS; 1; 28	CRS; 2; 7	CAS; 1; 6	CAS; 2; 24	VCA; 1; 25	VCA; 2 Ret	VCA; 1; 13	VCA; 2; 13	MOU; 1; 12	MOU; 2; 26	CUI; 1; 25	CUI; 2; 5	BRA; 1 DSQ	BRA; 2; 3	INT; 1; 2	INT; 2; 6			11th	566
2026	AMattheis Vogel	Chevrolet Tracker	CRS; 1; 12	CRS; 2; 12	CAS; 1 Ret	CAS; 2; 20	INT; 1 Ret	INT; 2; 23	GOI; 1; 17	GOI; 2; 18	CUI; 1; 32	CUI; 2; 17	VCA; 1; 12	VCA; 2 DSQ	SCZ; 1; 13	SCZ; 2; 8	CRS; 1 Ret	CRS; 2 Ret	BRA; 1; 16	CAS; 1; 12	CAS; 2; 12	VEL; 1	INT; 1	INT; 2				24th*	309*

^{†} Did not finish, but was classified as he had completed more than 90% of the race distance. ^{*} Season still in progress.

Sporting positions
Preceded by William Buller	Formula 3 Brazil Open; Winner; 2011, 2012	Succeeded by Felipe Guimarães
