= Formula 3 Brazil Open =

Former Single-Seater Racing Championship

- Category: Single seaters
- Country: São Paulo, Brazil (Autódromo José Carlos Pace)
- Inaugural season: 2010
- Folded: 2014
- Constructors: Dallara
- Engine suppliers: Berta
- Tyre suppliers: Pirelli
- Last Drivers' champion: (Brazil) Felipe Guimarães
- Last Teams' champion: (United Kingdom) Hitech Racing
- Official website: f3brazilopen.com/

The Formula 3 Brazil Open, also known as the F3 Brazil Open, was an annual open wheel racing event at the grand prix circuit of Autódromo José Carlos Pace (Interlagos) in São Paulo, Brazil. The inaugural meeting took place in January 2010. In 2015, the cancellation was announced due to the renovation of Interlagos, but has not been done after that.

The rules and regulations are the same as used in the long-running Formula Three Sudamericana series, using Dallara chassis fitted with 260 bhp Berta engines and Pirelli tyres. The event is open to drivers of any nationality who are of Formula Three standard.

There are four races during the weekend but from the final one only will the winner be crowned: the first three act as qualifying races to decide the grid for the final race.

== Scoring system ==
- The grid for the first two races are determined by the results of the Friday qualifying session, with the fastest driver on pole for both races. Points are awarded in both races 1 and 2 to each driver, as shown below:

Points for each of Race 1 and Race 2
1st	2nd	3rd	4th	5th	6th	7th	8th	9th	10th	11th	12th	13th	14th	15th	16th	17th	18th	19th	20th	21st	22nd	23rd	24th	25th	26th	27th	28th
0	1	2	3	4	5	6	7	8	9	10	11	12	13	14	15	16	17	18	19	20	21	22	23	24	25	26	27

- The grid for Race 3 is defined by the total scores of each driver from the first two races, with the driver who scored the fewest points (from having the best results) going on pole position. In the event of a tie, the driver who finished best in Race 2 is given grid priority. The grid for Race 4 (the final, main race) is determined just by the finishing order of Race 3.

== Results ==
Year	Winner	Team	Class B Winner	Class B Team
2010	(United Kingdom) William Buller	Hitech Racing Brazil	(Brazil) Leandro Florenzo	RC3 Bassani
2011	(Brazil) Lucas Foresti	Cesário Fórmula	(Brazil) Raphael Abbate	Cesário Fórmula Jr.
2012	(Brazil) Lucas Foresti	Cesário Fórmula	(Brazil) Vinícius Alvarenga	Dragão Motorsport
2013	(Brazil) Felipe Guimarães	Hitech Racing	(Brazil) Eduardo Banzoli	Capital Motorsport
2014	(Brazil) Felipe Guimarães	Hitech Racing	(Brazil) Artur Fortunato	Cesário Fórmula

== See also ==
- Formula 3 Sudamericana
- Fórmula 3 Brasil
- Formula Three
