= Tim Paul =

Totem pole carver

- Born: 1950 (age 75–76); Esperanza Inlet, British Columbia, Canada
- Citizenship: Nuu-Chah-Nulth
- Education: residential school
- Years active: 1975-2020
- Known for: master totem pole carver

Tim Paul (born 1950) is a member of the Hesquiaht tribe from the Nuu-Chah-Nulth first nation. He is a master carver from Esperanza Inlet, British Columbia, Canada. He was the senior carver at the Royal British Columbia Museum until 1992 when he left to oversee an indigenous education program for the Port Alberni school board on Vancouver Island.

== Early life ==
Tim Paul was born in Esperanza Inlet. At the age of 11 he was suspected to have contracted tuberculosis and was sent to the Nanaimo Indian Hospital for treatment. While at the hospital he met a man who carved model totem poles. The man gave him a small carving knife and a piece of cedar and that is when he created his first carving. Paul attended Indian Residential school, where he lost much of his ability to speak his Indigenous language fluently. Recognizing the importance of language and the oral stories of the Nuu-Chah-Nulth people many of his carvings are created to honor the themes of language and story.

== Career ==
In 1975, Paul began carving at the Arts of the Raven Studio in Victoria, B.C. He learned under the direction of Ben Andrews and John Livingston. In 1977 he became an assistant carver to Richard Hunt at Thunderbird Park at the Royal British Columbia Museum. Seven years later he was the first carver from outside of the Hunt family to become a senior carver. He worked at Thunderbird Park until 1992, when he left to develop the indigenous education curriculum for the Port Alberni school board.

While working at Thunderbird Park he accepted commissions for many high-profile totem poles. His work can be seen at the Great Hall of the Canadian Museum of Civilization in Hull, Quebec and in Auckland, New Zealand as a presentation to commemorate the 1990 Commonwealth Games. Paul has also worked as the Chief Carver on projects for Stanley Park in Vancouver and the Yorkshire Sculpture Park in England. In addition to totem poles, Paul also carves masks and sculpture, and creates screen printed art.

In 2019 Paul began work on a Language Revitalization Pole that was commissioned by the First Nations Education Foundation (FNEF) to commemorate the United Nations International Year of Indigenous Language, using an 800 year old wind fallen cedar log. The totem will symbolize the ten relations of the Nuu-Chul-Nuth people

== Gallery ==
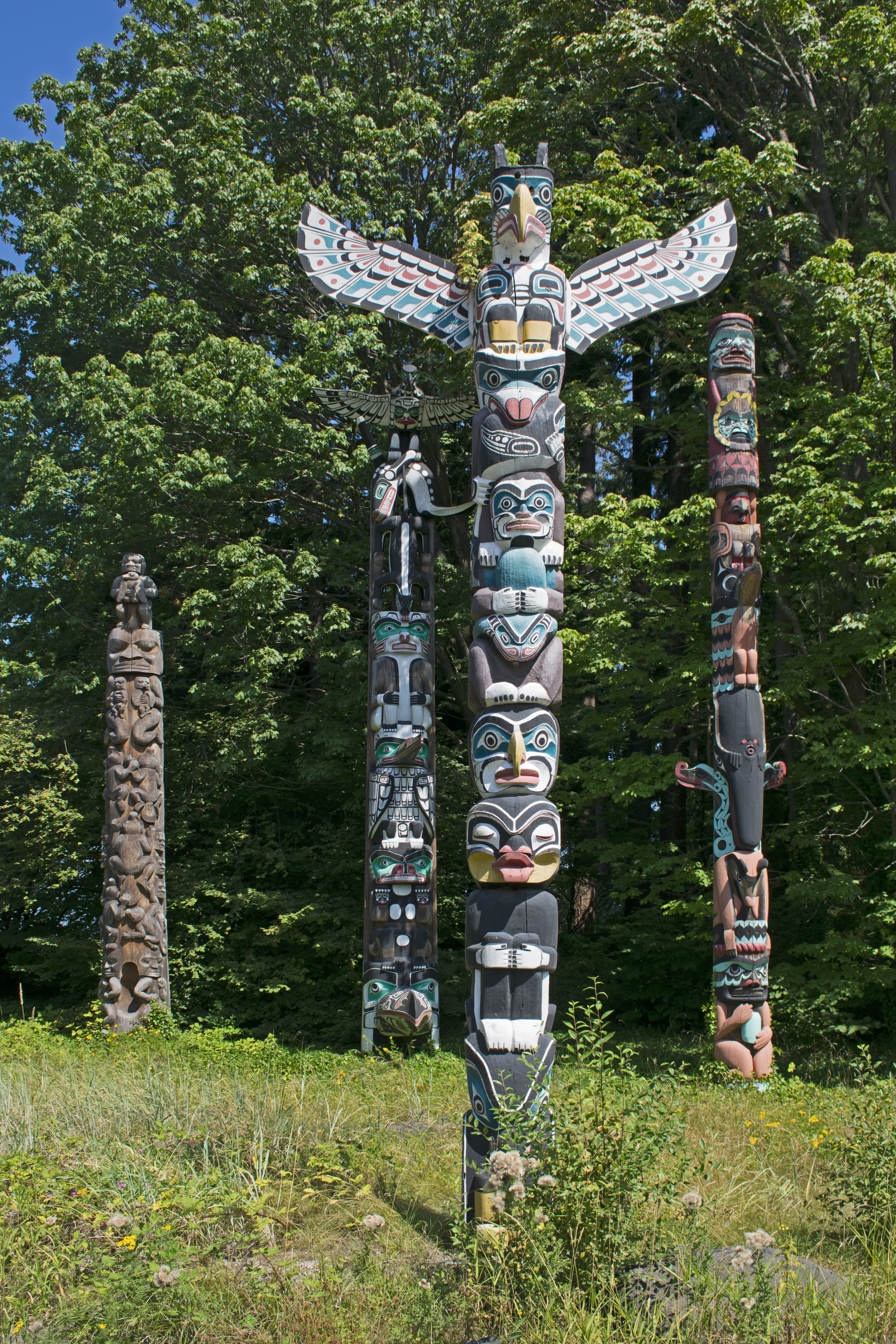
Kakaso'Las totem pole at Stanley Park, Vancouver, Canada

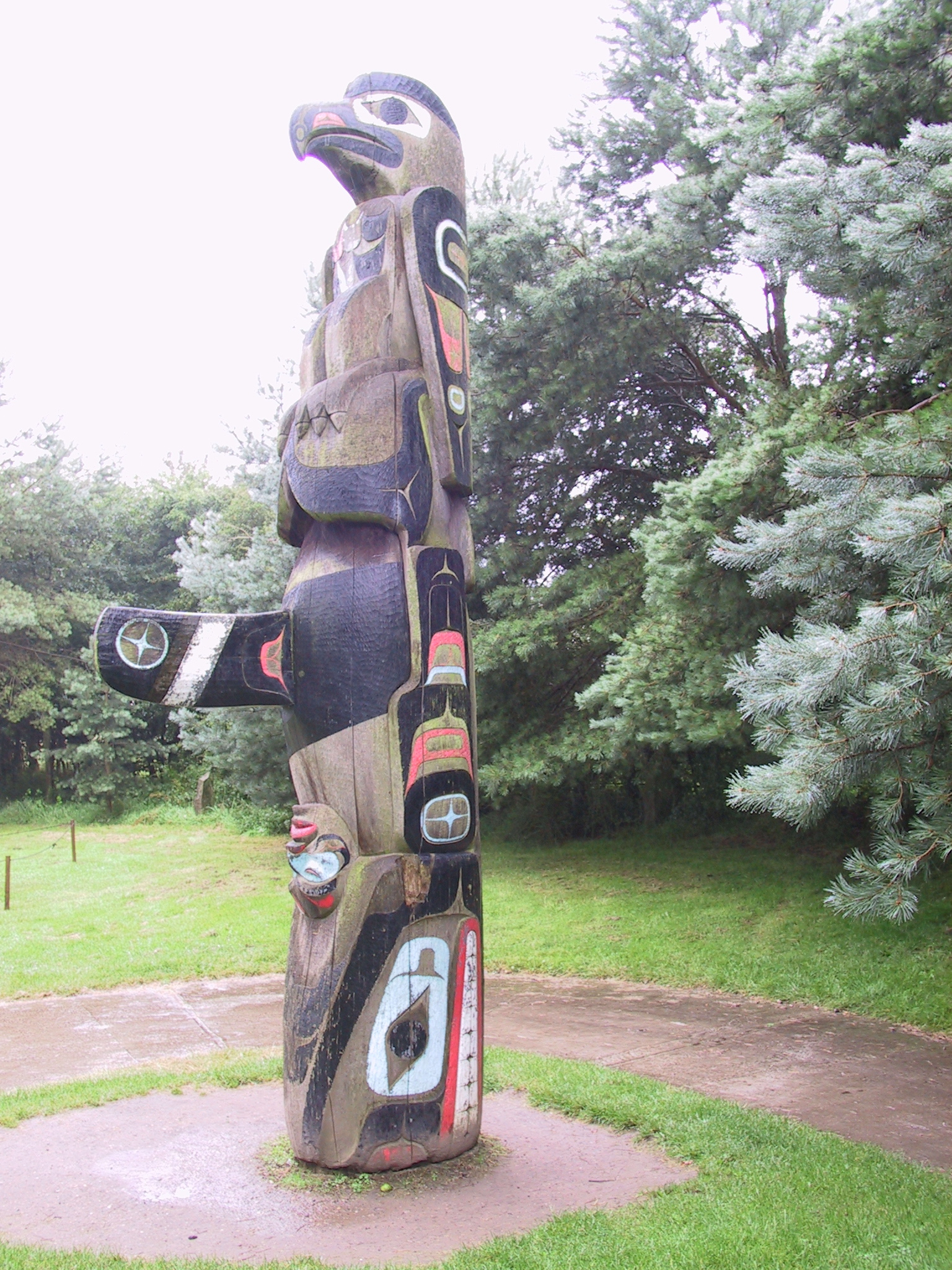
1982 totem pole at the Yorkshire Sculpture Park, England

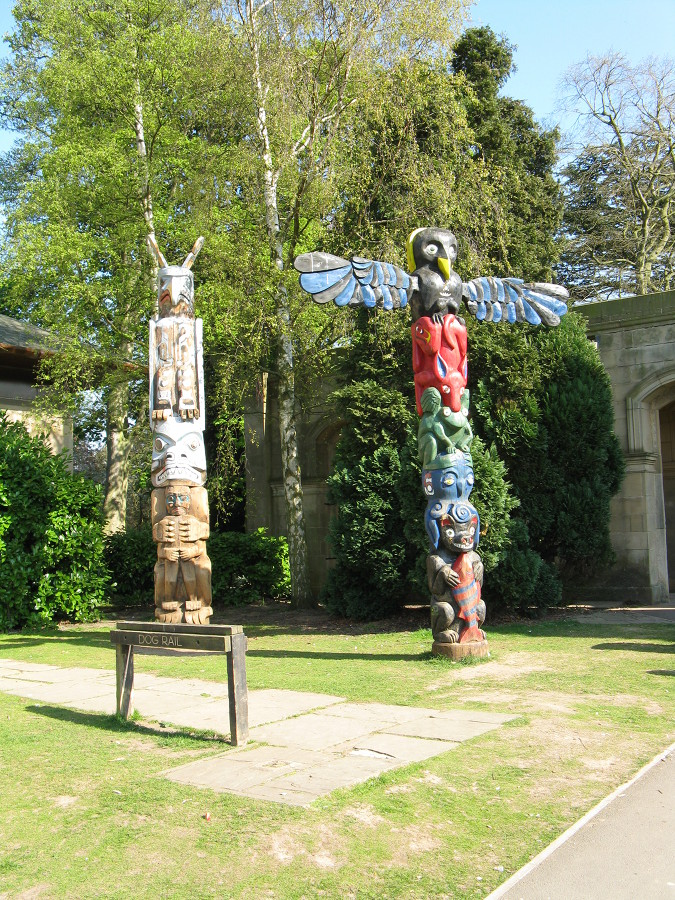
Totem poles at the Captain Cook Birthplace Museum, Middlesbrough, England

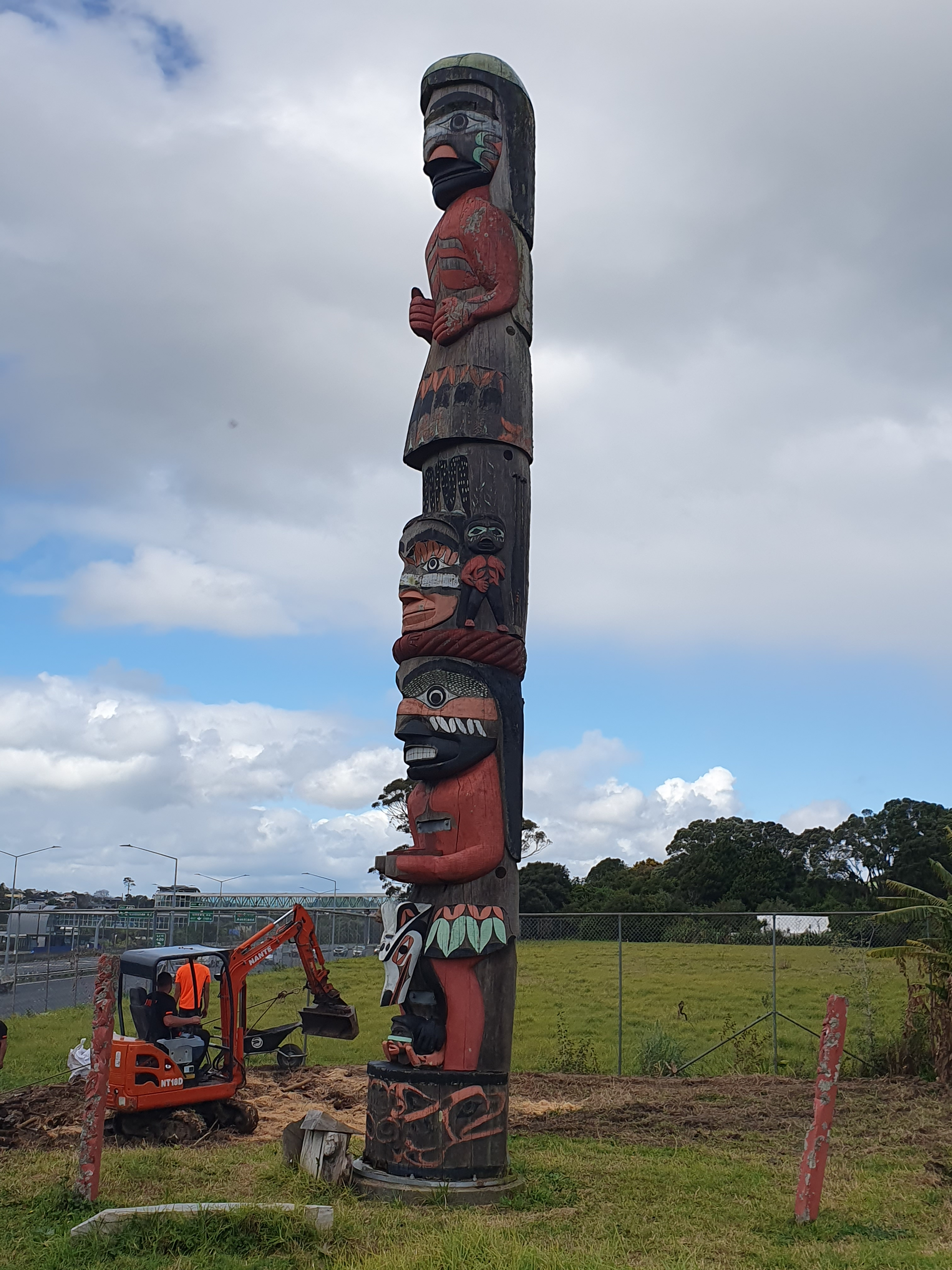
The North Shore totem (1990) in Auckland, New Zealand

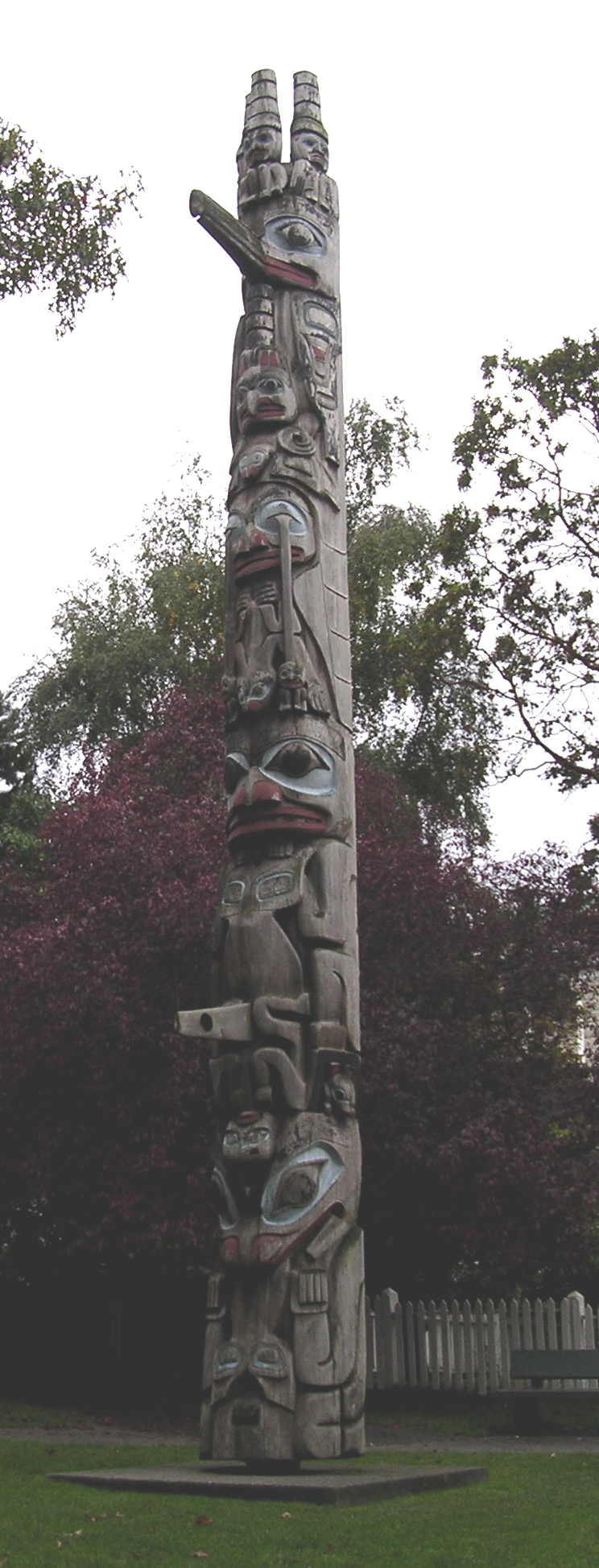
Haida Pole (1984) in Thunderbird Park, Victoria, Canada
