= 2017 12 Hours of Sebring =

Sports car endurance race

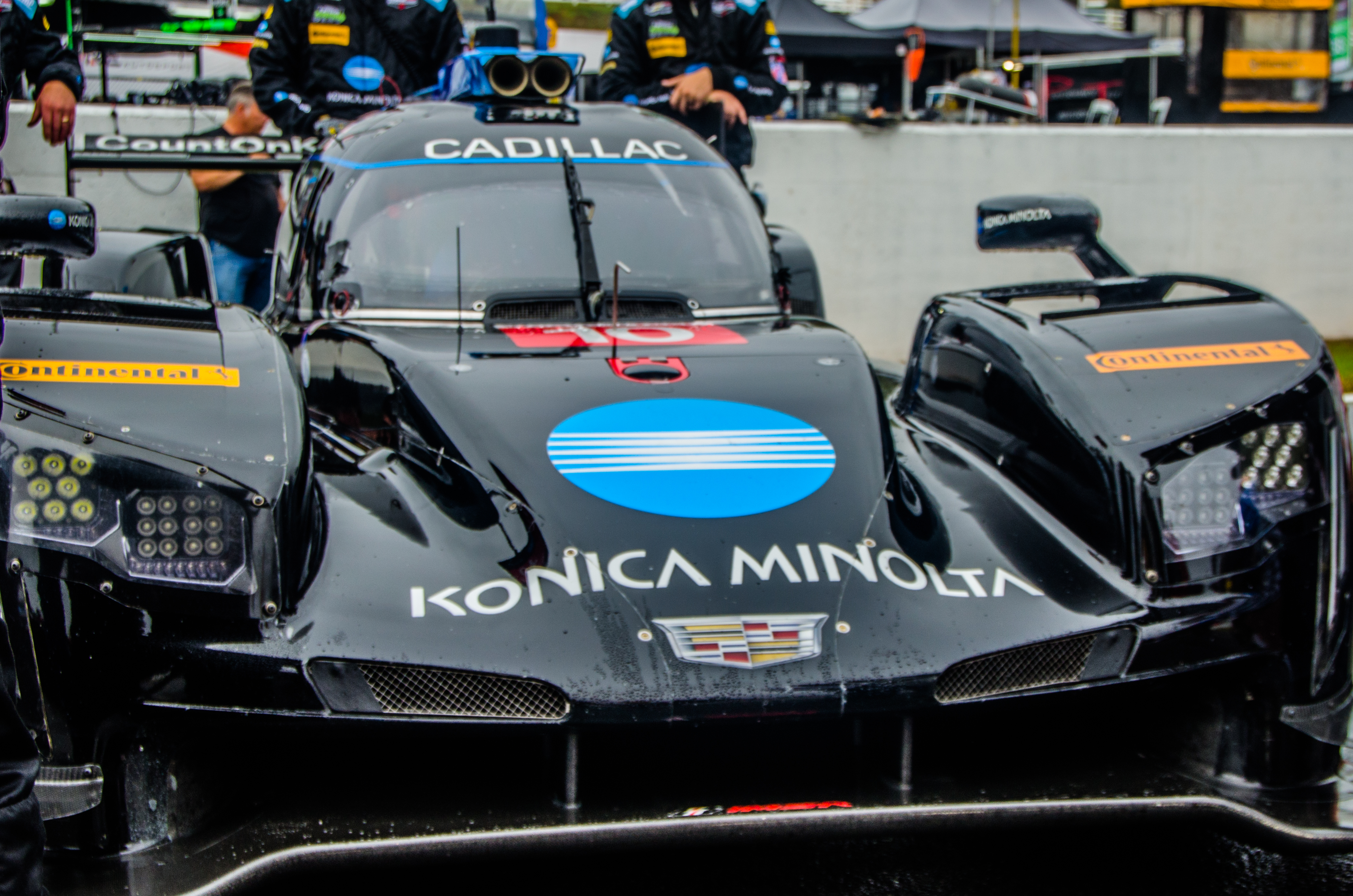
Cadillac DPi-V.R

Sebring International Raceway

The 65th Mobil 1 12 Hours of Sebring fueled by Fresh from Florida was an endurance sports car racing event held at Sebring International Raceway near Sebring, Florida from 16 to 18 March 2017. The race was the second round of the 2017 WeatherTech SportsCar Championship, as well as the second round of the North American Endurance Cup.

The race was won by Wayne Taylor Racing's Cadillac DPi-V.R driven by Ricky Taylor, Jordan Taylor, and Alex Lynn, ahead of Mustang Sampling Racing's Cadillac DPi-V.R and Whelen Engineering Racing's Cadillac DPi-V.R. The PC class winners were Performance Tech Motorsports with drivers James French, Patricio O'Ward, and Kyle Masson driving an Oreca FLM09. Corvette Racing won the GTLM class for the third straight year with Antonio García, Jan Magnussen, and Mike Rockenfeller taking the win in their Chevrolet Corvette C7.R. The GTD category was won by Riley Motorsports - WeatherTech Racing's Ben Keating, Jeroen Bleekemolen, and Mario Farnbacher in a Mercedes-AMG GT3.

== Background ==
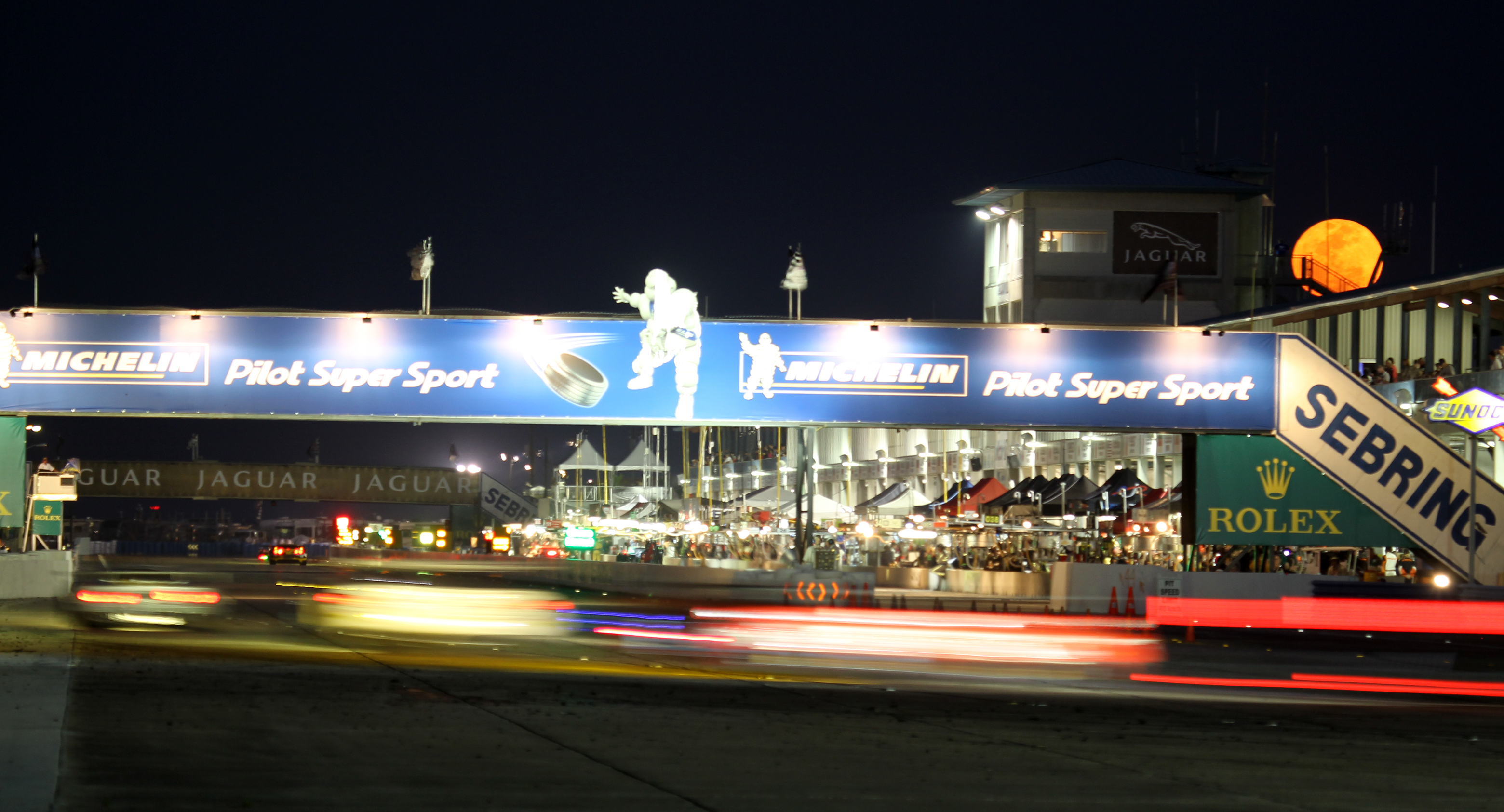
Sebring International Raceway, where the race was held.

International Motor Sports Association (IMSA) president Scott Atherton confirmed that the race was part of the 2017 IMSA SportsCar Championship schedule in August 2016. It was the fourth year in a row that the race was part of the series calendar, and the 65th 12 Hours of Sebring. The race was the second of 2017's twelve scheduled IMSA automobile endurance races, and the second of four North American Endurance Cup (NAEC) events. It was held at the 17-turn, 3.741-mile (6.021 km) Sebring International Raceway in Sebring, Florida on March 18, 2017.

After the 24 Hours of Daytona 7 weeks earlier, Jordan Taylor, Ricky Taylor, Max Angelelli, and Jeff Gordon were leading the Prototype Drivers' Championship with 35 points. With 36 points, James French, Patricio O'Ward, Kyle Masson, and Nicholas Boulle led the PC Drivers' Championship. GTLM was led by Joey Hand, Dirk Müller, and Sébastien Bourdais with a three-point advantage over Frédéric Makowiecki, Patrick Pilet, and Dirk Werner. In GTD, the Drivers' Championship was led by Michael Christensen, Carlos de Quesada, Michael de Quesada, Jesse Lazare, Daniel Morad with 35 points ahead of Connor De Phillippi, Jules Gounon, Christopher Mies, and Jeffrey Schmidt. Cadillac, Ford, and Porsche were leading their respective Manufacturers' Championships, while Wayne Taylor Racing, Performance Tech Motorsport, Ford Chip Ganassi Racing, and Alegra Motorsports each led their own Teams' Championships.

On March 8, 2017, IMSA issued the latest technical bulletin outlining the Balance of Performance for the event. In P, the Cadillac DPi-V.R received a 20 kilogram weight increase and a 0.6 mm smaller air restrictor. In GTLM, the BMW M6 GTLM and Porsche 911 RSR were given fuel capacity increases of 4 and 3 liters, respectively. In GTD, the Acura NSX GT3 received a 20 kilogram weight increase as well an increase in turbo boost, and 1 extra liter of fuel capacity. The Audi R8 LMS received a 5 kilogram weight increase. The Mercedes-AMG GT3 received a 20 kilogram weight increase as well as a 1.5 mm larger air restrictor, and 2 extra liters of fuel capacity. The Porsche 911 GT3 R received a fuel capacity increase of 2 liters while the Lexus RC F GT3 lost 1 liter of fuel capacity.

== Entries ==
A total of 46 cars took part in the event split across four classes. 10 cars were entered in P, 4 in PC, 10 in GTLM, and 21 in GTD. In P, Alex Lynn replaced Max Angelelli in the #10 Wayne Taylor Racing entry after Angelelli retired from racing after Daytona. DragonSpeed were absent. Marino Franchitti joined Tom Long and Joel Miller in the #70 Mazda Motorsports entry. In PC, Starworks Motorsport scaled down to one entry. Garett Grist, Max Hanratty, and Sean Rayhall shared the #8 Starworks Motorsport entry. Gustavo Yacamán joined Marc Drumwright, Chapman Ducote, and Colin Thompson in the #26 BAR1 Motorsports entry. In GTLM, Ford Chip Ganassi Team UK scaled down to one entry. In GTD, Konrad Motorsport, Spirit of Race, Manthey Racing, Aston Martin Racing, and TRG were absent. GRT Grasser Racing Team scaled down to one entry. Spencer Pumpelly joined Daniel Morad, Michael Christensen, and Michael de Quesada in the #28 Alegra Motorsports entry.

== Practice ==
There were four practice sessions preceding the start of the race on Saturday, three on Thursday and one on Friday. The first two one-hour sessions were on Thursday morning and afternoon. The third held later that evening ran for 90 minutes; the fourth on Friday morning lasted an hour.

=== Practice 1 ===
The first practice session took place at 11:10 am ET on Thursday and ended with Stephen Simpson topping the charts for JDC-Miller MotorSports, with a lap time of 1:49.516. The PC class was topped by the #38 Performance Tech Motorsports Oreca FLM09 of Patricio O'Ward with a time of 1:55.172. Frédéric Makowiecki was fastest in GTLM while Bryan Sellers set the fastest time in GTD.

Pos.	Class	No.	Team	Driver	Time	Gap
1	P	85	JDC-Miller MotorSports	Stephen Simpson	1:49.516	_
2	P	5	Mustang Sampling Racing	Christian Fittipaldi	1:49.557	+0.041
3	P	31	Whelen Engineering Racing	Mike Conway	1:49.608	+0.092

=== Practice 2 ===
The second practice session took place at 3:15 pm ET on Thursday and ended with Jordan Taylor topping the charts for Wayne Taylor Racing, with a lap time of 1:49.888. Colin Thompson set the fastest time in PC. The GTLM class was topped by the #4 Corvette Racing Chevrolet Corvette C7.R of Tommy Milner with a lap time of 1:57.206. Sébastien Bourdais was second in the #66 Ford Chip Ganassi Racing car and Antonio García rounded out the top 3. Andrew Davis was fastest in GTD.

Pos.	Class	No.	Team	Driver	Time	Gap
1	P	10	Wayne Taylor Racing	Jordan Taylor	1:49.888	_
2	P	5	Mustang Sampling Racing	João Barbosa	1:50.103	+0.215
3	P	31	Whelen Engineering Racing	Mike Conway	1:50.370	+0.482

=== Night Practice ===
The night practice session took place at 7:30 pm ET on Thursday and ended with Mike Conway topping the charts for Whelen Engineering Racing, with a lap time of 1:49.815. Gustavo Yacamán set the fastest time PC by 0.257 seconds ahead of Sean Rayhall in the #8 Starworks Motorsport entry. Sébastien Bourdais set the fastest time in GTLM with a time of 1:57.166. The GTD class was topped by the #57 Stevenson Motorsports Audi R8 LMS of Lawson Aschenbach with a lap time of 2:00.964.

Pos.	Class	No.	Team	Driver	Time	Gap
1	P	31	Whelen Engineering Racing	Mike Conway	1:49.815	_
2	P	10	Wayne Taylor Racing	Ricky Taylor	1:50.072	+0.257
3	P	5	Mustang Sampling Racing	Filipe Albuquerque	1:50.169	+0.354

=== Final Practice ===
The fourth and final practice session took place at 9:20 am ET on Friday and ended with Christian Fittipaldi topping the charts for Mustang Sampling Racing, with a lap time of 1:49.211. Gustavo Yacamán set the fastest time in PC. Dirk Müller was fastest in GTLM while Michael Christensen set the fastest time in GTD.

Pos.	Class	No.	Team	Driver	Time	Gap
1	P	5	Mustang Sampling Racing	Christian Fittipaldi	1:49.211	_
2	P	13	Rebellion Racing	Neel Jani	1:49.329	+0.118
3	P	2	Tequila Patrón ESM	Pipo Derani	1:49.405	+0.194

== Qualifying ==
On Friday afternoon's 90-minute four-group qualifying, each category had separate 15-minute sessions. Regulations stipulated that teams nominate one qualifying driver, with the fastest laps determining each class' starting order. IMSA then arranged the grid to put Prototypes ahead of the PC, GTLM and GTD cars.

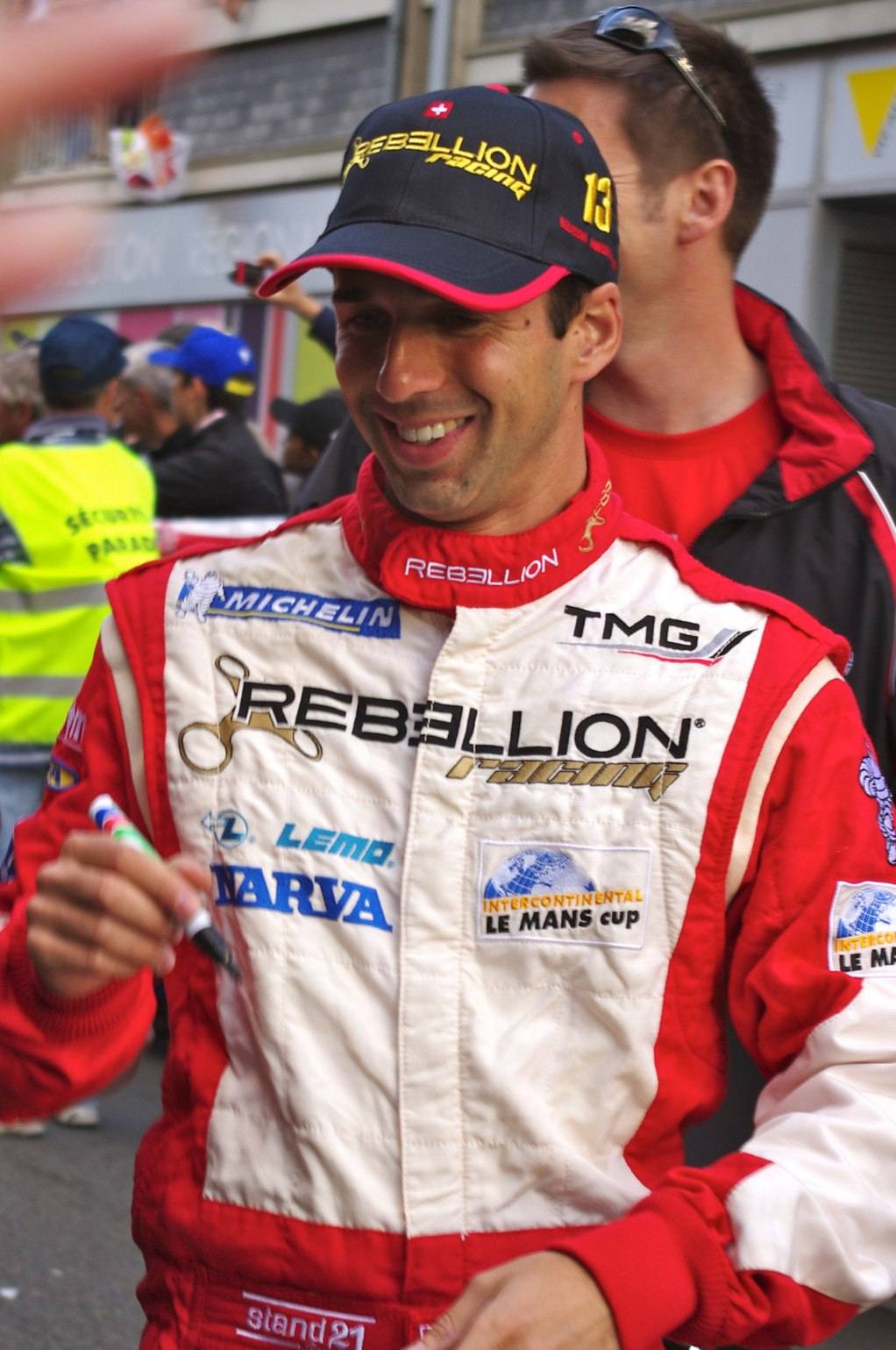
Neel Jani (pictured in 2011) took the overall pole position for Rebellion Racing.

The first was for cars in GTD class. Tristan Vautier qualified on pole for the class driving the #75 SunEnergy1 Racing car.

The second session of qualifying was for cars in the GTLM class. Ryan Briscoe qualified on pole driving the #67 car for Ford Chip Ganassi Racing, besting Dirk Müller in the sister #66 entry.

The third session of qualifying was for cars in the PC class. Gustavo Yacamán set the fastest time driving the #26 BAR1 Motorsports car.

The final session of qualifying was for the P class. Neel Jani qualified on pole driving the #13 car for Rebellion Racing, beating Christian Fittipaldi in the #5 Mustang Sampling Racing by less than one tenth of a second.

=== Qualifying results ===
Pole positions in each class are indicated in bold and by ‡.

Pos.	Class	No.	Team	Driver	Time	Gap	Grid
1	**P**	**13**	**(Switzerland)** Rebellion Racing	**(Switzerland) Neel Jani**	**1:48.178**	**_**	1 ‡
2	P	5	(United States) Mustang Sampling Racing	(Brazil) Christian Fittipaldi	1:48.273	+0.095	2
3	P	31	(United States) Whelen Engineering Racing	(United States) Dane Cameron	1:48.314	+0.136	3
4	P	52	(United States) PR1/Mathiasen Motorsports	(Mexico) José Gutiérrez	1:49.056	+0.878	4
5	P	22	(United States) Tequila Patrón ESM	(New Zealand) Brendon Hartley	1:149.103	+0.925	5
6	P	10	(United States) Wayne Taylor Racing	(United States) Ricky Taylor	1:49.541	+1.363	6
7	P	85	(United States) JDC-Miller MotorSports	(South Africa) Stephen Simpson	1:49.587	+1.409	7
8	P	55	(Japan) Mazda Motorsports	(United States) Jonathan Bomarito	1:49.907	+1.729	8
9	P	90	(United States) VisitFlorida Racing	(Netherlands) Renger van der Zande	1:49.919	+1.741	9
10	P	70	(Japan) Mazda Motorsports	(United States) Joel Miller	1:50.284	+2.106	10
11	**PC**	**26**	**(United States) BAR1 Motorsports**	**(Colombia) Gustavo Yacamán**	**1:53.506**	**+5.328**	11‡
12	PC	38	(United States) Performance Tech Motorsports	(United States) James French	1:53.575	+5.397	12
13	PC	20	(United States) BAR1 Motorsports	(United States) Buddy Rice	1:55.846	+7.668	13
14	**GTLM**	**67**	**(United States) Ford Chip Ganassi Racing**	**(Australia) Ryan Briscoe**	**1:55.939**	**+7.761**	16‡
15	GTLM	66	(United States) Ford Chip Ganassi Racing	(Germany) Dirk Müller	1:56.175	+7.997	17
16	GTLM	4	(United States) Corvette Racing	(United States) Tommy Milner	1:56.252	+8.074	45^{1}
17	GTLM	912	(United States) Porsche GT Team	(France) Kévin Estre	1:56.319	+8.141	18
18	GTLM	3	(United States) Corvette Racing	(Spain) Antonio García	1:56.368	+8.190	19
19	PC	8	(United States) Starworks Motorsport	(Canada) Garett Grist	1:56.433	+8.255	14
20	GTLM	68	(United States) Ford Chip Ganassi Team UK	(Germany) Stefan Mücke	1:56.441	+8.263	20
21	GTLM	911	(United States) Porsche GT Team	(Germany) Dirk Werner	1:56.487	+8.309	21
22	GTLM	24	(United States) BMW Team RLL	(Netherlands) Nick Catsburg	1:56.617	+8.439	22
23	GTLM	25	(United States) BMW Team RLL	(United Kingdom) Alexander Sims	1:56.660	+8.482	23
24	GTLM	62	(United States) Risi Competizione	(Italy) Giancarlo Fisichella	1:57.475	+9.297	24
25	**GTD**	**75**	**(United States) SunEnergy1 Racing**	**(France) Tristan Vautier**	**1:59.738**	**+11.560**	25‡
26	GTD	29	(Germany) Montaplast by Land-Motorsport	(United States) Connor De Phillippi	2:00.490	+12.312	26
27	GTD	16	(United States) Change Racing	(United States) Corey Lewis	2:00.967	+12.789	27
28	GTD	15	(United States) 3GT Racing	(United States) Robert Alon	2:00.998	+12.820	28
29	GTD	14	(United States) 3GT Racing	(United States) Scott Pruett	2:01.158	+12.980	29
30	GTD	57	(United States) Stevenson Motorsports	(United States) Andrew Davis	2:01.222	+13.044	30
31	GTD	33	(United States) Riley Motorsports - Team AMG	(United States) Ben Keating	2:01.284	+13.106	31
32	GTD	50	(United States) Riley Motorsports - WeatherTech Racing	(United States) Cooper MacNeil	2:01.358	+13.180	32
33	GTD	11	(Austria) GRT Grasser Racing Team	(Italy) Mirko Bortolotti	2:01.385	+13.207	33
34	GTD	63	(United States) Scuderia Corsa	(Denmark) Christina Nielsen	2:01.628	+13.450	34
35	GTD	93	(United States) Michael Shank Racing with Curb Agajanian	(Canada) Mark Wilkins	2:01.687	+13.509	35
36	GTD	28	(United States) Alegra Motorsports	(Canada) Daniel Morad	2:01.752	+13.574	36
37	GTD	73	(United States) Park Place Motorsports	(United States) Patrick Lindsey	2:01.966	+13.788	37
38	GTD	86	(United States) Michael Shank Racing with Curb Agajanian	(Brazil) Oswaldo Negri Jr.	2:02.096	+13.918	38
39	GTD	23	(United States) Alex Job Racing	(United States) Townsend Bell	2:02.234	+14.056	39
40	GTD	96	(United States) Turner Motorsport	(United States) Justin Marks	2:02.256	+14.078	40
41	GTD	48	(United States) Paul Miller Racing	(United States) Madison Snow	2:02.345	+14.167	41
42	GTD	46	(Italy) EBIMOTORS	(France) Emmanuel Collard	2:03.201	+15.023	42
43	GTD	54	(United States) CORE Autosport	(United States) Jon Bennett	2:03.672	+15.494	46^{2}
44	GTD	18	(Canada) DAC Motorsports	(United States) Brandon Gdovic	2:04.154	+15.976	43
45	GTD	27	(United States) Dream Racing Motorsport	(United States) Lawrence DeGeorge	2:08.569	+20.291	44
46	P	2	(United States) Tequila Patrón ESM	Disqualified			15
Sources:

- ^{1} The No. 4 Corvette Racing entry was moved to the back of the GTLM field for violating competition rules regarding the car's ride height.
- ^{2} The No. 54 CORE Autosport entry was moved to the back of the GTD field as per Article 43.6 of the Sporting regulations (Change of starting tires).

== Post-race ==
With a total of 70 points, Jordan Taylor and Ricky Taylor's victory allowed them to increase their advantage over Fittipaldi, Barbosa, and Albuquerque in the Prototype Drivers' Championship to 5 points. Cameron, Curran, and Conway advanced from sixth to third. In the PC Drivers' Championship, Rayhall advanced from fourth to second while Boulle dropped from first to fifth. The result kept Hand, Müller, and Bourdais atop the GTLM Drivers' Championship. García, Magnussen, and Rockenfeller advanced from fourth to second. As a result of winning the race, Bleekemolen, Keating, and Farnbacher advanced from third to first in the GTD Drivers' Championship. Cadillac, and Ford continued to top their respective Manufacturers' Championships while Mercedes-AMG took the lead of the GTD Manufacturers' Championship. Wayne Taylor Racing, Performance Tech Motorsports, and Ford Chip Ganassi Racing kept their respective advantages in their of Teams' Championships. Riley Motorsports Team AMG took the lead of the GTD Teams' Championship with ten rounds remaining.

=== Race results ===
Class winners are denoted in bold.

Final race classification
Pos	Class	No.	Team	Drivers	Chassis	Tire	Laps	Time/Retired
Pos	Class	No.	Team	Drivers	Engine	Tire	Laps	Time/Retired
1	**P**	**10**	**(United States) Wayne Taylor Racing**	**(United States) Ricky Taylor (United States) Jordan Taylor (United Kingdom) Alex Lynn**	**Cadillac DPi-V.R**	C	**348**	**12:01:09.861**
1	**P**	**10**	**(United States) Wayne Taylor Racing**	**(United States) Ricky Taylor (United States) Jordan Taylor (United Kingdom) Alex Lynn**	**Cadillac 6.2 L V8**	C	**348**	**12:01:09.861**
2	P	5	(United States) Mustang Sampling Racing	(Portugal) João Barbosa (Brazil) Christian Fittipaldi (Portugal) Filipe Albuquerque	Cadillac DPi-V.R	C	348	+13.614
2	P	5	(United States) Mustang Sampling Racing	(Portugal) João Barbosa (Brazil) Christian Fittipaldi (Portugal) Filipe Albuquerque	Cadillac 6.2 L V8	C	348	+13.614
3	P	31	(United States) Whelen Engineering Racing	(United States) Dane Cameron (United States) Eric Curran (United Kingdom) Mike Conway	Cadillac DPi-V.R	C	346	+2 Laps
3	P	31	(United States) Whelen Engineering Racing	(United States) Dane Cameron (United States) Eric Curran (United Kingdom) Mike Conway	Cadillac 6.2 L V8	C	346	+2 Laps
4	P	85	(United States) JDC-Miller MotorSports	(United States) Chris Miller (South Africa) Stephen Simpson (Canada) Mikhail Goikhberg	Oreca 07	C	344	+4 Laps
4	P	85	(United States) JDC-Miller MotorSports	(United States) Chris Miller (South Africa) Stephen Simpson (Canada) Mikhail Goikhberg	Gibson GK428 4.2 L V8	C	344	+4 Laps
5	**PC**	**38**	**(United States) Performance Tech Motorsports**	**(United States) James French (Mexico) Patricio O'Ward (United States) Kyle Masson**	**Oreca FLM09**	C	**338**	**+10 Laps**
5	**PC**	**38**	**(United States) Performance Tech Motorsports**	**(United States) James French (Mexico) Patricio O'Ward (United States) Kyle Masson**	**Chevrolet 6.2 L V8**	C	**338**	**+10 Laps**
6	PC	8	(United States) Starworks Motorsport	(Canada) Garett Grist (United States) Max Hanratty (United States) Sean Rayhall	Oreca FLM09	C	336	+12 Laps
6	PC	8	(United States) Starworks Motorsport	(Canada) Garett Grist (United States) Max Hanratty (United States) Sean Rayhall	Chevrolet 6.2 L V8	C	336	+12 Laps
7	**GTLM**	**3**	**(United States) Corvette Racing**	**(Spain) Antonio García (Denmark) Jan Magnussen (Germany) Mike Rockenfeller**	**Chevrolet Corvette C7.R**	MI	**334**	**+14 Laps**
7	**GTLM**	**3**	**(United States) Corvette Racing**	**(Spain) Antonio García (Denmark) Jan Magnussen (Germany) Mike Rockenfeller**	Chevrolet LT5.5 5.5 L V8	MI	**334**	**+14 Laps**
8	GTLM	66	(United States) Ford Chip Ganassi Racing	(Germany) Dirk Müller (United States) Joey Hand (France) Sébastien Bourdais	Ford GT	MI	334	+14 Laps
8	GTLM	66	(United States) Ford Chip Ganassi Racing	(Germany) Dirk Müller (United States) Joey Hand (France) Sébastien Bourdais	Ford EcoBoost 3.5 L Twin-turbo V6	MI	334	+14 Laps
9	GTLM	62	(United States) Risi Competizione	(Italy) Giancarlo Fisichella (United Kingdom) James Calado (Finland) Toni Vilander	Ferrari 488 GTE	MI	334	+14 Laps
9	GTLM	62	(United States) Risi Competizione	(Italy) Giancarlo Fisichella (United Kingdom) James Calado (Finland) Toni Vilander	Ferrari F154CB 3.9 L Turbo V8	MI	334	+14 Laps
10	GTLM	67	(United States) Ford Chip Ganassi Racing	(Australia) Ryan Briscoe (United Kingdom) Richard Westbrook (New Zealand) Scott Dixon	Ford GT	MI	334	+14 Laps
10	GTLM	67	(United States) Ford Chip Ganassi Racing	(Australia) Ryan Briscoe (United Kingdom) Richard Westbrook (New Zealand) Scott Dixon	Ford EcoBoost 3.5 L Twin-turbo V6	MI	334	+14 Laps
11	GTLM	68	(United States) Ford Chip Ganassi Team UK	(Germany) Stefan Mücke (France) Olivier Pla (United States) Billy Johnson	Ford GT	MI	334	+14 Laps
11	GTLM	68	(United States) Ford Chip Ganassi Team UK	(Germany) Stefan Mücke (France) Olivier Pla (United States) Billy Johnson	Ford EcoBoost 3.5 L Twin-turbo V6	MI	334	+14 Laps
12	GTLM	24	(United States) BMW Team RLL	(United States) Bill Auberlen (United Kingdom) Alexander Sims (Canada) Kuno Wittmer	BMW M6 GTLM	MI	334	+14 Laps
12	GTLM	24	(United States) BMW Team RLL	(United States) Bill Auberlen (United Kingdom) Alexander Sims (Canada) Kuno Wittmer	BMW 4.4 L Turbo V8	MI	334	+14 Laps
13	GTLM	911	(United States) Porsche GT Team	(France) Patrick Pilet (Germany) Dirk Werner (France) Frédéric Makowiecki	Porsche 911 RSR	MI	334	+14 Laps
13	GTLM	911	(United States) Porsche GT Team	(France) Patrick Pilet (Germany) Dirk Werner (France) Frédéric Makowiecki	Porsche 4.0 L Flat-6	MI	334	+14 Laps
14	GTLM	912	(United States) Porsche GT Team	(France) Kévin Estre (Belgium) Laurens Vanthoor (Austria) Richard Lietz	Porsche 911 RSR	MI	332	+16 Laps
14	GTLM	912	(United States) Porsche GT Team	(France) Kévin Estre (Belgium) Laurens Vanthoor (Austria) Richard Lietz	Porsche 4.0 L Flat-6	MI	332	+16 Laps
15	PC	26	(United States) BAR1 Motorsports	(United States) Marc Drumwright (United States) Chapman Ducote (Colombia) Gustavo Yacamán (United States) Colin Thompson	Oreca FLM09	C	328	+20 Laps
15	PC	26	(United States) BAR1 Motorsports	(United States) Marc Drumwright (United States) Chapman Ducote (Colombia) Gustavo Yacamán (United States) Colin Thompson	Chevrolet 6.2 L V8	C	328	+20 Laps
16	**GTD**	**33**	**(United States) Riley Motorsports - Team AMG**	**(United States) Ben Keating (Netherlands) Jeroen Bleekemolen (Germany) Mario Farnbacher**	**Mercedes-AMG GT3**	C	**325**	**+23 Laps**
16	**GTD**	**33**	**(United States) Riley Motorsports - Team AMG**	**(United States) Ben Keating (Netherlands) Jeroen Bleekemolen (Germany) Mario Farnbacher**	**Mercedes AMG M159 6.2 L V8**	C	**325**	**+23 Laps**
17	GTD	63	(United States) Scuderia Corsa	(Denmark) Christina Nielsen (Italy) Alessandro Balzan (Italy) Matteo Cressoni	Ferrari 488 GT3	C	324	+24 Laps
17	GTD	63	(United States) Scuderia Corsa	(Denmark) Christina Nielsen (Italy) Alessandro Balzan (Italy) Matteo Cressoni	Ferrari F154CB 3.9 L Turbo V8	C	324	+24 Laps
18	GTD	75	(United States) SunEnergy1 Racing	(Australia) Kenny Habul (United States) Boris Said (France) Tristan Vautier	Mercedes-AMG GT3	C	324	+24 Laps
18	GTD	75	(United States) SunEnergy1 Racing	(Australia) Kenny Habul (United States) Boris Said (France) Tristan Vautier	Mercedes AMG M159 6.2 L V8	C	324	+24 Laps
19	GTD	29	(Germany) Montaplast by Land-Motorsport	(United States) Connor De Phillippi (Germany) Christopher Mies (France) Jules Gounon	Audi R8 LMS	C	324	+24 Laps
19	GTD	29	(Germany) Montaplast by Land-Motorsport	(United States) Connor De Phillippi (Germany) Christopher Mies (France) Jules Gounon	Audi 5.2L V10	C	324	+24 Laps
20	GTD	48	(United States) Paul Miller Racing	(United States) Bryan Sellers (United States) Madison Snow (United States) Dion von Moltke	Lamborghini Huracán GT3	C	324	+24 Laps
20	GTD	48	(United States) Paul Miller Racing	(United States) Bryan Sellers (United States) Madison Snow (United States) Dion von Moltke	Lamborghini 5.2 L V10	C	324	+24 Laps
21	GTD	73	(United States) Park Place Motorsports	(United States) Patrick Lindsey (Germany) Jörg Bergmeister (United States) Matt McMurry (Belgium) Jan Heylen	Porsche 911 GT3 R	C	324	+24 Laps
21	GTD	73	(United States) Park Place Motorsports	(United States) Patrick Lindsey (Germany) Jörg Bergmeister (United States) Matt McMurry (Belgium) Jan Heylen	Porsche 4.0 L Flat-6	C	324	+24 Laps
22	GTD	57	(United States) Stevenson Motorsports	(United States) Lawson Aschenbach (United States) Andrew Davis (United States) Matt Bell	Audi R8 LMS	C	324	+24 Laps
22	GTD	57	(United States) Stevenson Motorsports	(United States) Lawson Aschenbach (United States) Andrew Davis (United States) Matt Bell	Audi 5.2L V10	C	324	+24 Laps
23	GTD	86	(United States) Michael Shank Racing with Curb Agajanian	(United States) Jeff Segal (Brazil) Oswaldo Negri Jr. (United States) Tom Dyer	Acura NSX GT3	C	324	+24 Laps
23	GTD	86	(United States) Michael Shank Racing with Curb Agajanian	(United States) Jeff Segal (Brazil) Oswaldo Negri Jr. (United States) Tom Dyer	Acura 3.5 L Turbo V6	C	324	+24 Laps
24	GTD	11	(Austria) GRT Grasser Racing Team	(Germany) Christian Engelhart (Switzerland) Rolf Ineichen (Italy) Richard Antinucci (Italy) Mirko Bortolotti	Lamborghini Huracán GT3	C	323	+25 Laps
24	GTD	11	(Austria) GRT Grasser Racing Team	(Germany) Christian Engelhart (Switzerland) Rolf Ineichen (Italy) Richard Antinucci (Italy) Mirko Bortolotti	Lamborghini 5.2 L V10	C	323	+25 Laps
25	GTD	28	(United States) Alegra Motorsports	(United States) Michael de Quesada (Canada) Daniel Morad (United States) Spencer Pumpelly (Denmark) Michael Christensen	Porsche 911 GT3 R	C	323	+25 Laps
25	GTD	28	(United States) Alegra Motorsports	(United States) Michael de Quesada (Canada) Daniel Morad (United States) Spencer Pumpelly (Denmark) Michael Christensen	Porsche 4.0 L Flat-6	C	323	+25 Laps
26	GTD	16	(United States) Change Racing	(United States) Corey Lewis (Netherlands) Jeroen Mul (United States) Brett Sandberg	Lamborghini Huracán GT3	C	322	+26 Laps
26	GTD	16	(United States) Change Racing	(United States) Corey Lewis (Netherlands) Jeroen Mul (United States) Brett Sandberg	Lamborghini 5.2 L V10	C	322	+26 Laps
27	GTD	46	(Italy) EBIMOTORS	(Italy) Emanuele Busnelli (Italy) Fabio Babini (France) Emmanuel Collard (Italy) Michele Beretta	Lamborghini Huracán GT3	C	322	+26 Laps
27	GTD	46	(Italy) EBIMOTORS	(Italy) Emanuele Busnelli (Italy) Fabio Babini (France) Emmanuel Collard (Italy) Michele Beretta	Lamborghini 5.2 L V10	C	322	+26 Laps
28	GTD	15	(United States) 3GT Racing	(United Kingdom) Jack Hawksworth (United States) Robert Alon (United States) Austin Cindric	Lexus RC F GT3	C	320	+28 Laps
28	GTD	15	(United States) 3GT Racing	(United Kingdom) Jack Hawksworth (United States) Robert Alon (United States) Austin Cindric	Lexus 5.0L V8	C	320	+28 Laps
29	P	55	(Japan) Mazda Motorsports	(United States) Tristan Nunez (United States) Jonathan Bomarito (United States) Spencer Pigot	Mazda RT24-P	C	319	+29 Laps
29	P	55	(Japan) Mazda Motorsports	(United States) Tristan Nunez (United States) Jonathan Bomarito (United States) Spencer Pigot	Mazda MZ-2.0T 2.0 L Turbo I4	C	319	+29 Laps
30	GTD	93	(United States) Michael Shank Racing with Curb Agajanian	(United States) Andy Lally (United Kingdom) Katherine Legge (Canada) Mark Wilkins	Acura NSX GT3	C	318	+30 Laps
30	GTD	93	(United States) Michael Shank Racing with Curb Agajanian	(United States) Andy Lally (United Kingdom) Katherine Legge (Canada) Mark Wilkins	Acura 3.5 L Turbo V6	C	318	+30 Laps
31	GTD	23	(United States) Alex Job Racing	(United States) Bill Sweedler (United States) Townsend Bell (United States) Frank Montecalvo	Audi R8 LMS	C	309	+39 Laps
31	GTD	23	(United States) Alex Job Racing	(United States) Bill Sweedler (United States) Townsend Bell (United States) Frank Montecalvo	Audi 5.2L V10	C	309	+39 Laps
32	PC	20	(United States) BAR1 Motorsports	(United States) Don Yount (United States) Buddy Rice (Canada) Daniel Burkett (United States) Mark Kvamme	Oreca FLM09	C	302	+46 Laps
32	PC	20	(United States) BAR1 Motorsports	(United States) Don Yount (United States) Buddy Rice (Canada) Daniel Burkett (United States) Mark Kvamme	Chevrolet 6.2 L V8	C	302	+46 Laps
33 DNF	GTD	54	(United States) CORE Autosport	(United States) Jon Bennett (United States) Colin Braun (Sweden) Niclas Jönsson	Porsche 911 GT3 R	C	283	Oil Pressure
33 DNF	GTD	54	(United States) CORE Autosport	(United States) Jon Bennett (United States) Colin Braun (Sweden) Niclas Jönsson	Porsche 4.0 L Flat-6	C	283	Oil Pressure
34	GTD	18	(Canada) DAC Motorsports	(Canada) Emmanuel Anassis (United States) Brandon Gdovic (United States) Anthony Massari	Lamborghini Huracán GT3	C	282	+66 Laps
34	GTD	18	(Canada) DAC Motorsports	(Canada) Emmanuel Anassis (United States) Brandon Gdovic (United States) Anthony Massari	Lamborghini 5.2 L V10	C	282	+66 Laps
35	GTD	14	(United States) 3GT Racing	(United States) Scott Pruett (United States) Sage Karam (United Kingdom) Ian James	Lexus RC F GT3	C	269	+79 Laps
35	GTD	14	(United States) 3GT Racing	(United States) Scott Pruett (United States) Sage Karam (United Kingdom) Ian James	Lexus 5.0L V8	C	269	+79 Laps
36	GTD	27	(United States) Dream Racing Motorsport	(United States) Lawrence DeGeorge (Monaco) Cédric Sbirrazzuoli (Italy) Paolo Ruberti (Italy) Luca Persiani	Lamborghini Huracán GT3	C	255	+93 Laps
36	GTD	27	(United States) Dream Racing Motorsport	(United States) Lawrence DeGeorge (Monaco) Cédric Sbirrazzuoli (Italy) Paolo Ruberti (Italy) Luca Persiani	Lamborghini 5.2 L V10	C	255	+93 Laps
37	P	90	(United States) VisitFlorida Racing	(Belgium) Marc Goossens (Netherlands) Renger van der Zande (Germany) René Rast	Riley Mk. 30	C	241	+107 Laps
37	P	90	(United States) VisitFlorida Racing	(Belgium) Marc Goossens (Netherlands) Renger van der Zande (Germany) René Rast	Gibson GK428 4.2 L V8	C	241	+107 Laps
38	GTD	96	(United States) Turner Motorsport	(United States) Justin Marks (Germany) Jens Klingmann (Finland) Jesse Krohn	BMW M6 GT3	C	228	+120 laps
38	GTD	96	(United States) Turner Motorsport	(United States) Justin Marks (Germany) Jens Klingmann (Finland) Jesse Krohn	BMW 4.4L Turbo V8	C	228	+120 laps
39 DNF	P	52	(United States) PR1/Mathiasen Motorsports	(United States) Mike Guasch (Mexico) José Gutiérrez (United Kingdom) Tom Kimber-Smith	Ligier JS P217	C	205	Gearbox
39 DNF	P	52	(United States) PR1/Mathiasen Motorsports	(United States) Mike Guasch (Mexico) José Gutiérrez (United Kingdom) Tom Kimber-Smith	Gibson GK428 4.2 L V8	C	205	Gearbox
40 DNF	P	70	(Japan) Mazda Motorsports	(United States) Tom Long (United States) Joel Miller (United Kingdom) Marino Franchitti	Mazda RT-24P	C	180	Suspension
40 DNF	P	70	(Japan) Mazda Motorsports	(United States) Tom Long (United States) Joel Miller (United Kingdom) Marino Franchitti	Mazda MZ-2.0T 2.0 L Turbo I4	C	180	Suspension
41	P	13	(Switzerland) Rebellion Racing	(Switzerland) Sébastien Buemi (Germany) Nick Heidfeld (Switzerland) Neel Jani	Oreca 07	C	167	+181 Laps
41	P	13	(Switzerland) Rebellion Racing	(Switzerland) Sébastien Buemi (Germany) Nick Heidfeld (Switzerland) Neel Jani	Gibson GK428 4.2 L V8	C	167	+181 Laps
42 DNF	P	22	(United States) Tequila Patrón ESM	(United States) Ed Brown (United States) Johannes van Overbeek (Brazil) Bruno Senna (New Zealand) Brendon Hartley	Nissan Onroak DPi	C	158	Exhaust
42 DNF	P	22	(United States) Tequila Patrón ESM	(United States) Ed Brown (United States) Johannes van Overbeek (Brazil) Bruno Senna (New Zealand) Brendon Hartley	Nissan VR38DETT 3.8 L Turbo V6	C	158	Exhaust
43 DNF	GTLM	24	(United States) BMW Team RLL	(United States) John Edwards (Germany) Martin Tomczyk (Netherlands) Nick Catsburg	BMW M6 GTLM	MI	149	Crash
43 DNF	GTLM	24	(United States) BMW Team RLL	(United States) John Edwards (Germany) Martin Tomczyk (Netherlands) Nick Catsburg	BMW 4.4 L Turbo V8	MI	149	Crash
44 DNF	GTD	50	(United States) Riley Motorsports - WeatherTech Racing	(United States) Cooper MacNeil (United States) Gunnar Jeannette (New Zealand) Shane van Gisbergen	Mercedes-AMG GT3	C	132	Suspension
44 DNF	GTD	50	(United States) Riley Motorsports - WeatherTech Racing	(United States) Cooper MacNeil (United States) Gunnar Jeannette (New Zealand) Shane van Gisbergen	Mercedes AMG M159 6.2 L V8	C	132	Suspension
45 DNF	P	2	(United States) Tequila Patrón ESM	(United States) Scott Sharp (United Kingdom) Ryan Dalziel (Brazil) Pipo Derani	Nissan Onroak DPi	C	47	Turbo
45 DNF	P	2	(United States) Tequila Patrón ESM	(United States) Scott Sharp (United Kingdom) Ryan Dalziel (Brazil) Pipo Derani	Nissan VR38DETT 3.8 L Turbo V6	C	47	Turbo
46 DNF	GTLM	4	(United States) Corvette Racing	(United Kingdom) Oliver Gavin (United States) Tommy Milner (Switzerland) Marcel Fässler	Chevrolet Corvette C7.R	MI	42	Overheating
46 DNF	GTLM	4	(United States) Corvette Racing	(United Kingdom) Oliver Gavin (United States) Tommy Milner (Switzerland) Marcel Fässler	Chevrolet LT5.5 5.5 L V8	MI	42	Overheating

Tyre manufacturers
Key
Symbol	Tyre manufacturer
**C**	Continental
**MI**	Michelin

== Statistics ==
- Fastest Lap - #31 Mike Conway - 1:49.629 on lap 100

== Standings after the race ==
Prototype Drivers' Championship standings
Pos.	+/–	Driver	Points
1		(United States) Jordan Taylor (United States) Ricky Taylor	70
2		(Portugal) João Barbosa (Brazil) Christian Fittipaldi (Portugal) Filipe Albuquerque	65
3	3	(United States) Dane Cameron (United States) Eric Curran (United Kingdom) Mike Conway	56
4	1	(Belgium) Marc Goossens (Netherlands) Renger van der Zande (Germany) René Rast	55
5		(Canada) Mikhail Goikhberg (South Africa) Stephen Simpson (United States) Chris Miller	54

PC Drivers' Championship standings
Pos.	+/–	Driver	Points
1		(United States) James French (Mexico) Patricio O'Ward (United States) Kyle Masson	72
2	2	(United States) Sean Rayhall	60
3		(United States) Chapman Ducote (Colombia) Gustavo Yacamán	59
4	1	(United States) Buddy Rice (United States) Don Yount (United States) Mark Kvamme	58
5	4	(United States) Nicholas Boulle	36

GTLM Drivers' Championship standings
Pos.	+/–	Driver	Points
1		(United States) Joey Hand (Germany) Dirk Müller (France) Sébastien Bourdais	67
2	2	(Spain) Antonio García (Denmark) Jan Magnussen (Germany) Mike Rockenfeller	63
3		(Italy) Giancarlo Fisichella (Finland) Toni Vilander (United Kingdom) James Calado	60
4	2	(France) Patrick Pilet (Germany) Dirk Werner (France) Frédéric Makowiecki	57
5	5	(Australia) Ryan Briscoe (United Kingdom) Richard Westbrook (New Zealand) Scott Dixon	50

GTD Drivers' Championship standings
Pos.	+/–	Driver	Points
1	2	(Netherlands) Jeroen Bleekemolen (United States) Ben Keating (Germany) Mario Farnbacher	66
2		(Germany) Christopher Mies (United States) Connor De Phillippi (France) Jules Gounon	60
3	2	(Canada) Daniel Morad (United States) Michael de Quesada (Denmark) Michael Christensen	56
4		(United States) Lawson Aschenbach (United States) Andrew Davis (United States) Matt Bell	52
5	2	(United States) Bryan Sellers (United States) Madison Snow (South Africa) Dion von Moltke	50

- Note: Only the top five positions are included for all sets of standings.

Prototype Teams' Championship standings
Pos.	+/–	Team	Points
1		(United States) #10 Wayne Taylor Racing	70
2		(United States) #5 Mustang Sampling Racing	65
3	3	(United States) #31 Whelen Engineering Racing	56
4	1	(United States) #90 VisitFlorida Racing	55
5		(United States) #85 JDC-Miller MotorSports	54

PC Teams' Championship standings
Pos.	+/–	Team	Points
1		(United States) #38 Performance Tech Motorsports	72
2		(United States) #26 BAR1 Motorsports	61
3	2	(United States) #8 Starworks Motorsport	58
4	1	(United States) #20 BAR1 Motorsports	58
5	1	(United States) #88 Starworks Motorsport	28

GTLM Teams' Championship standings
Pos.	+/–	Team	Points
1		(United States) #66 Ford Chip Ganassi Racing	67
2	2	(United States) #3 Corvette Racing	63
3		(United States) #62 Risi Competizione	60
4	2	(United States) #911 Porsche GT Team	57
5	5	(United States) #67 Ford Chip Ganassi Racing	50

GTD Teams' Championship standings
Pos.	+/–	Team	Points
1	2	(United States) #33 Riley Motorsports Team AMG	66
2	1	(Germany) #29 Montaplast by Land-Motorsport	60
3	2	(United States) #28 Alegra Motorsports	56
4		(United States) #57 Stevenson Motorsports	52
5	2	(United States) #48 Paul Miller Racing	50

- Note: Only the top five positions are included for all sets of standings.

Prototype Manufacturers' Championship standings
Pos.	+/–	Manufacturer	Points
1		(United States) Cadillac	70
2		(Japan) Nissan	62
3		(Japan) Mazda	62

GTLM Manufacturers' Championship standings
Pos.	+/–	Manufacturer	Points
1		(United States) Ford	67
2	2	(United States) Chevrolet	63
3		(Italy) Ferrari	60
4	2	(Germany) Porsche	58
5		(Germany) BMW	54

GTD Manufacturers' Championship standing
Pos.	+/–	Manufacturer	Points
1	2	(Germany) Mercedes-AMG	65
2		(Germany) Audi	62
3	2	(Germany) Porsche	61
4	5	(Italy) Ferrari	54
5		(Italy) Lamborghini	54

- Note: Only the top five positions are included for all sets of standings.

IMSA SportsCar Championship
Previous race: 24 Hours of Daytona	2017 season	Next race: Grand Prix of Long Beach
