= Wyatt Gooden =

American racing driver (born 1988)

- Born: 10 October 1988 (age 38) Cleveland, Ohio, United States

U.S. F2000 National Championship career
- Debut season: 2013
- Current team: Afterburner Autosport
- Car number: 17
- Starts: 4
- Podiums: 2

Previous series
- 2010 2011 2012: Volkswagen Jetta TDI Cup; F1600 Championship Series; F2000 Championship Series

Wyatt Gooden (born October 10, 1988 in Cleveland, Ohio) is an American racing driver who most notably competed in the 2013 U.S. F2000 National Championship with Afterburner Autosport. In 2009 he became the first person in the United States to earn a manufacturer funded ride in a professional auto racing series by winning the iRacing TDI Cup Virtual Series in iRacing.com.

== 2010 ==
Through a $45,000 scholarship earned by winning the 2009 iRacing.com VW Jetta TDI Cup from Volkswagen of America, Gooden competed in the Volkswagen Jetta TDI Cup. Having achieved two victories during the season, he won the Rookie of the Year title.

== 2011 ==
Midway through the year, Gooden was awarded the opportunity to drive a Honda powered Open wheel car in professional competition. His open wheel debut took place at the 2011 F1600 Championship Series Mid-Ohio Sports Car Course event, where he won both races. One month later, Gooden was selected for the 2011 Team USA Scholarship, becoming a finalist. In October 2011, he competed in two more F1600 Championship Series events at Watkins Glen International, winning both races and earning the title as #1 Ranked Formula Ford driver in 2011 by eFormulaCarNews.com.

== 2012 ==
Gooden competed in the F2000 Championship Series with Quantum Racing Services. He finished second in points with two wins and two poles among 12 podium finishes from 14 races.

=== U.S. F2000 National Championship ===
Year	Team	1	2	3	4	5	6	7	8	9	10	11	12	13	14	Rank	Points
2013	Afterburner Autosport	SEB; 7	SEB; 6	STP; 2	STP; 2	LOR; 12	TOR; 24	TOR; 12	MOH; 9	MOH; 14	MOH; 8	LAG; 3	LAG; 6	HOU; 4	HOU; 22	5th	187
