= 2009 Volkswagen Jetta TDI Cup =

Seasons
- ← 2008 2010 →

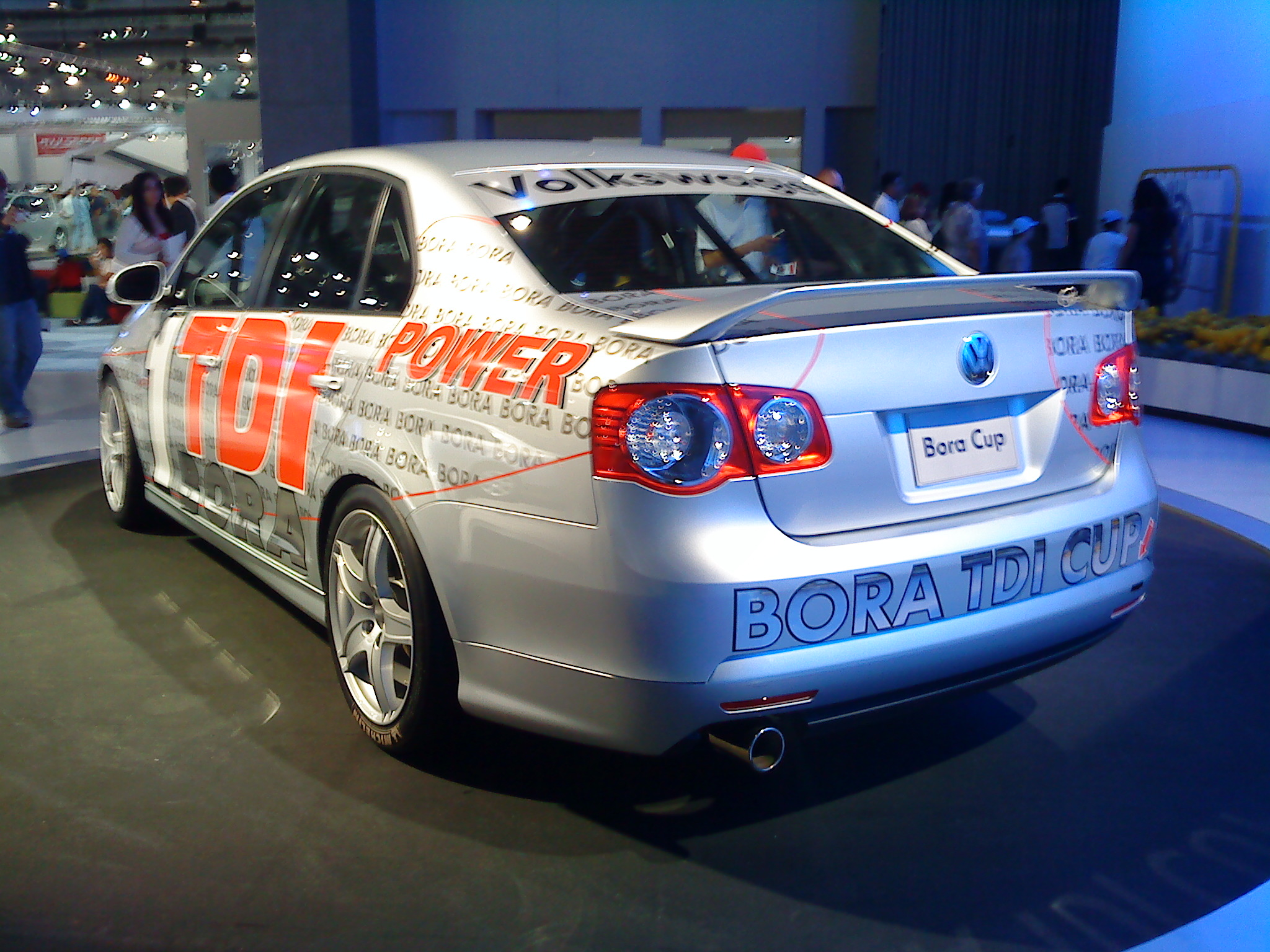
Jetta TDI car from German race series.

The 2009 Volkswagen Jetta TDI Cup was the Volkswagen Jetta TDI Cup's second season. In 2009 10 races were set to take place on eight circuits. Both Virginia International Raceway and New Jersey Motorsports Park were doubleheader events hosting two rounds each. There are also four new tracks for the 2009 season, Miller Motorsports Park, Mid-Ohio Sports Car Course, Autobahn Country Club, and Road America. Gone for the season are Iowa Speedway and Lime Rock Park.

Also new for this season is a new fuel from Hyperfuels, the official supplier for the TDI Cup. This year all the race cars, as well as all the vehicle/equipment transporters and generators used by the series, will run SynDiesel B5 Biodiesel. Late in the 2008 season, Pirelli announced that they would be the official tire supplier for the 2009 season.

== Drivers ==
Name	Hometown	Car #	Sponsor
Joey Atterbury	Renton, WA	14	Red Bull
Andy Lee	Maricopa, AZ	27	Castrol
Nicky Boulle	Dallas, TX	4	Pirelli
Timmy Megenbier	Melrose Park, IL	17	ChicagolandVW.com
Taylor Broekemeier	Fort Collins, CO	3	Pirelli
JD Mobley	Castle Rock, CO	7	Bosch
Juan Pablo Delgado	Orizaba, VZ (Mexico)	34	SCCA
Eric Morse	Pittsburgh, PA	16	VW Preloved
Andrew Novich	Novato, CA	22	Meguiars
AJ Nealey	Edgewater, MD	2	Oakley
Devin Cates	Broad Run, VA	29	HYPERFUELS
Andrew Gunn Tucker	McDonough, GA	32	Oakley
Theresa Condict	Lexington, MA	15	HYPERFUELS
Mark Pombo	Duluth, GA	20	VW Parts & Accessories
Andrew Cordeiro	Woodbridge, ON	26	Lamin-x
Perry Richardson	Los Gatos, CA	30	DefNder
David Richert	Niverville, MB	6	Bosch
Ryan Ellis	Ashburn, VA	5	ViON
Juan Pablo Sierra Lendle	Puebla, Mexico	23	Castrol
Kerstin Smutny	Bothel, WA	18	iRacing.com
Jake Thompson	Vancouver, BC	19	ViON
Derek Jones	Philadelphia, PA	8	Aggreko
Rhett Tucker	Cumming, GA	28	DC United
Donny Warren	Winchester, VA	24	Aggreko
Kyle Wharff	Miramar, FL	11	VW Parts & Accessories

== Season results ==
Rd.	Date	Track	Location	Pole Position	Winning driver	Supporting
1	April 24–26	Virginia International Raceway; Doubleheader	Danville, Virginia	Joey Atterbury	Joey Atterbury	Rolex Sports Car Series
2	April 24–26	Virginia International Raceway; Doubleheader	Danville, Virginia	Timmy Megenbier	Jake Thompson	Rolex Sports Car Series
3	May 15–17	Miller Motorsports Park	Tooele, Utah	Jake Thompson	Timmy Megenbier	American Le Mans Series
4	June 19–21	Mid-Ohio Sports Car Course	Lexington, Ohio	Devin Cates	Timmy Megenbier	Rolex Sports Car Series
5	July 24–26	Autobahn Country Club	Joliet, Illinois	Andy Lee	Andy Lee	Atlantic Championship
6	August 14–16	Road America	Elkhart Lake, Wisconsin	Timmy Megenbier	Timmy Megenbier	American Le Mans Series
7	August 28–30	Mosport International Raceway	Bowmanville, Ontario	Mark Pombo	Mark Pombo	American Le Mans Series
8	September 11–13	New Jersey Motorsports Park; Doubleheader	Millville, New Jersey	Andy Lee	Jake Thompson	ARCA Re/Max Series
9	September 11–13	New Jersey Motorsports Park; Doubleheader	Millville, New Jersey	Mark Pombo	Devin Cates	ARCA Re/Max Series
10	September 25–27	Road Atlanta	Braselton, Georgia	Juan Pablo Sierra Lendle	Mark Pombo	American Le Mans Series

== Drivers Championship ==
Pos	Driver	VIR1 (United States)	VIR2 (United States)	MIL (United States)	MID (United States)	ACC (United States)	AME (United States)	MOS (Canada)	NJ1 (United States)	NJ2 (United States)	ATL (United States)	Points
1	(United States) Timmy Megenbier	3	**23**	1	1	2	**1**	2	3	3	11	366
2	(United States) Andy Lee	6	6	4	3	**1**	4	4	**2**	5	6	337
3	(United States) Mark Pombo	5	2	7	21	3	9	**1**	10	**2**	1	322
4	(United States) Joey Atterbury	**1**	8	6	2	5	3	6	5	12	4	307
5	(Canada) Jake Thompson	8	1	**2**	11	6	12	5	1	11	DNS	271
6	(Mexico) Juan Pablo Sierra Lendle	11	24	3	8	13	5	8	4	4	**3**	258
7	(Canada) Andrew Cordeiro	24	9	16	4	4	11	3	23	10	2	220
8	(United States) Nicky Boulle	9	11	13	5	9	14	12	7	6	11	208
9	(United States) JD Mobley	20	12	11	7	10	13	10	6	7	7	204
10	(United States) Devin Cates	7	7	12	**16**	16	22	15	8	1	5	196
11	(United States) Taylor Broekemeier	4	3	5	12	7	7	13	11	23	13	195
12	(United States) AJ Nealey	2	4	9	9	11	2	17	20	14	18	187
13	(United States) Ryan Ellis	21	10	14	13	12	10	7	9	8	10	181
14	(United States) Derek Jones	22	5	8	6	8	6	14	21	DNS		142
15	(United States) Donny Warren	12	19	18	14	19	15	22	12	9	8	139
16	(United States) Perry Richardson	13	16	10	23	17	16	18	13	21	12	93
17	(United States) Andrew Novich	10	25	15	10	24	8	11	22	22	20	81
18	(Canada) David Richert	14	15	19	17	18	19	20	14	16	15	73
19	(United States) Rhett Tucker	25	13	DNS	10	14			17	13	14	62
20	(Mexico) Juan Pablo Delgado	23	17	17	19	15	21	16	16	20	17	58
21	(United States) Kerstin Smutny	16	21	23	‡	23	18	19	15	18	19	37
22	(United States) Theresa Condict	18	20	22	15	22	20	DNS	18	15	21	36
23	(United States) Eric Morse	15	18	21	18	20	17	22	24	17		33
24	(United States) Andrew Gunn Tucker	19	22	24	22	21	23	21	19	19	16	20
25	(United States) Kyle Wharff	17	14	20								13
Pos	Driver	VIR1 (United States)	VIR2 (United States)	MIL (United States)	MID (United States)	ACC (United States)	AME (United States)	MOS (Canada)	NJ1 (United States)	NJ2 (United States)	ATL (United States)	Points

‡ Smutny forced to sit out of race #4 in Ohio due to budget problems

Color	Result
Gold	Winner
Silver	2nd place
Bronze	3rd place
Green	Finished, in points
Blue	Finished, no points
Purple	Did not finish

**Bold** - Pole
Italics - Fastest Lap

== Race result links ==
Race #1
Race #2
Race #3
Race #4
Race #5
