= Mitch Martin =

Australian racing driver

- Nationality: (Australia) Australian

F1600 Championship Series career
- Debut season: 2011
- Current team: Borland Racing Developments
- Car number: 16
- Starts: 42
- Wins: 6
- Podiums: 18
- Poles: 3
- Fastest laps: 4

Mitch Martin is an Australian racing driver.

== 2011 ==
Martin debuted in the 2011 F1600 Championship Series, driving Borland Racing Developments' prototype Spectrum Formula F1600 at the Mid-Ohio Sports Car Course. Martin finished second in the race with the fastest lap, and finished 16th overall in the series.

He also competed in the Victorian State Circuit Racing Formula Vee Championship, driving Borland's Sabre 02 for team Zsidy Racing, placing first overall in the series.

== 2016 ==
He now drives for Gallay Race Team, Winning many races during training and now excelling in NSW race series. Falcon Racing Cup Champion series Leader.

== See also ==
- Motorsport in Australia
