= 2011 F1600 Championship Series =

2011 F1600 Championship season

Seasons
- ← none 2012 →

The 2011 F1600 Championship Series season was the inaugural season for the F1600 Championship Series. Bill Valet took the championship over Tim Kautz in the final round.

== Drivers and teams ==
Team	No.	Driver	Chassis	Engine	Note
(United States) Valet Racing	83	(United States) Bill Valet	Swift DB6	Ford Kent	
(United States) David James Racing	74	(United States) David James	Van Diemen RF98	Ford Kent	
(United States) BCR Racing	31	(United States) Brian Copperthite	Citation	Ford Kent	
(United States) Kolthoff Racing	77	(United States) Michael Kolthoff	Swift DB6	Ford Kent	
(United States) Zuponcic racing	73	(United States) Ralph Zuponcic	???	???	
(United States) Maisey Racing	41	(United States) Bill Maisey	Swift DB1	Honda Fit	
(United States) Maisey Racing	99	(United States) Sean Maisey	Citation SF95	Honda Fit	
	93	(United States) Glenn Taylor	???	???	
(United States) Cape Motorsports w/ Wayne Taylor Racing	01; 16	(United States) Ryan Leach	Swift DB6; Spectrum 011	Ford Kent; Honda Fit	
(United States) Cape Motorsports w/ Wayne Taylor Racing	16	(Australia) Mitch Martin	Spectrum 011	Honda Fit	
(United States) Cape Motorsports w/ Wayne Taylor Racing	01	(United States) Shannon McIntosh	Swift DB6	Ford Kent	
(United States) McBride Racing	53	(United States) Russ McBride	Swift DB1	Honda Fit	
(Canada) Rice Racing	13	(Canada) Greg Rice	Van Diemen	Ford Kent	
(Canada) Rice Racing	07	(Canada) Steve Bamford	Van Diemen RF93	Ford Kent	
(United States) Lee Racing	76	(United States) Jim Lee	Swift DB6	Ford Kent	
(United States) Lee Racing	19	(United States) John Robinson	Swift DB6	Honda Fit	
(United States) Generotti Motorsports	13	(United States) Jason Generotti	Swift DB1	Ford Kent	
(United States) JC Racing	8	(United States) Jacob Carpenter	Van Diemen RF93	Ford Kent	
(United States) Front Range Motorsports	60	(United States) Dwight Rider	Lola T440	Ford Kent	
(United States) Front Range Motorsports	21	(United States) Jon Butkovich	Swift DB1	Ford Kent	
(United States) Front Range Motorsports	11	(United States) Doug Stout	Swift DB1	Ford Kent	
(United States) LNR Racing	33	(United States) Len Amato	Van Diemen RF04	Ford Kent	
(United States) LNR Racing	3	(United States) Ric Baribeault	Piper DF5	Honda Fit	
(United States) LNR Racing	31	(United States) Chris Keller	Van Diemen RF04	Honda Fit	
(United States) Allen Racing	28	(United States) Wes Allen	Piper DF2	Ford Kent	
(United States) Roux Racing	36	(United States) Steve Roux	Royale RP31	Ford Kent	
	69	(United States) Erik Shepard	Tatuus RC98	Ford Kent	
(United States) Primus Racing	9	(United States) Samuel Beasley	Mygale SJ10	Honda Fit	
	47	(United States) Jim MacNicholl	Van Diemen RF81	Ford Kent	
(United States) DBM Racing	15	(United States) Jim Oseth	???	???	
(United States) Bardwell Racing	35	(United States) Todd Bardwell	Swift DB1	??	
(United States) Brumbaugh Racing	86	(United States) Kevin Brumbaugh	Crosslé 35F	Ford Kent	
(United States) Pennon Racing	18	(United States) Dan Pyanowski	Swift DB1	Ford Kent	
(United States) Polestar Racing Group	0	(United States) Lewis Cooper, III	Van Diemen RF00	Ford Kent	
(United States) Hobby Racing	91	(United States) Doug Hobby	Swift DB1	Ford Kent	
(Canada) BGR Team Grote	6	(Canada) Brian Graham	Van Diemen RF02	Ford Kent	
(United States) Devoe Racing	14	(United States) Ross Devoe	Van Diemen RF93	Ford Kent	
(United States) RECON Racing	44	(United States) Ed Callo	Bowman BC5	Ford Kent	
(United States) RMD Racing	4	(United States) Bob Detrick	Van Diemen RF98	Ford Kent	
(United States) Ski Motorsports	12	(United States) Jeremy Grenier	Citation FCZ0805	Honda Fit	
(United States) Groom Racing	63	(United States) Jon Groom	Swift DB1	Ford Kent	
(United States) ONP Racing	2	(United States) Mike Scanlan	Swift DB6	Honda Fit	
(United States) Oseth Racing	72	(United States) Stephen Oseth	Citation SF94	Honda Fit	
(United States) Hull Racing	71	(United States) Forrest Hull	Van Diemen	Ford Kent	
(Canada) Warp 9 Motorsports	68	(Canada) Caitlin Johnston	Van Diemen RF97	Honda Fit	
(United States) Quantum Racing Services	17	(United States) Wyatt Gooden	Van Diemen RF98	Honda Fit	
(United States) TTO Motorsports	5	(United States) Colin Thompson	Swift DB6	Honda Fit	
(United States) Foster Racing	23	(United States) Arthur Foster	Van Diemen RF00	Ford Kent	
(United States) Raceworks	7	(United States) Jim Goughary, Jr.	Piper DF5	Honda Fit	
(United States) Kautz Racing	88	(United States) Tim Kautz	Piper DF5	Ford Kent	

== Race calendar and results ==
Round	Circuit	Location	Date	Pole position	Fastest lap	Winning driver
1	Virginia International Raceway	(United States) Alton, Virginia	April 9	(United States) Samuel Beasley	(United States) Tim Kautz	(United States) Jim Goughary, Jr.
2	Virginia International Raceway	(United States) Alton, Virginia	April 10	(United States) Tim Kautz	(United States) Tim Kautz	(United States) Tim Kautz
3	Watkins Glen International	(United States) Watkins Glen, New York	June 4	(United States) Bill Valet	(United States) Tim Kautz	(United States) Bill Valet
4	Watkins Glen International	(United States) Watkins Glen, New York	June 5	(United States) Tim Kautz	(United States) Tim Kautz	(United States) Tim Kautz
5	Mid-Ohio Sports Car Course	(United States) Lexington, Ohio	July 1	(United States) Wyatt Gooden	(United States) Wyatt Gooden	(United States) Wyatt Gooden
6	Mid-Ohio Sports Car Course	(United States) Lexington, Ohio	July 2	(Australia) Mitch Martin	(Australia) Mitch Martin	(United States) Wyatt Gooden
7	Lime Rock Park	(United States) Lakeville, Connecticut	September 17	(United States) Jim Goughary, Jr.	(United States) Forrest Hull	(United States) Bill Valet
8	Lime Rock Park	(United States) Lakeville, Connecticut	September 17	(United States) Jim Goughary, Jr.	(United States) Colin Thompson	(United States) Arthur Foster
9	Watkins Glen International	(United States) Watkins Glen, New York	October 15	(United States) Wyatt Gooden	(United States) Wyatt Gooden	(United States) Wyatt Gooden
10	Watkins Glen International	(United States) Watkins Glen, New York	October 16	(United States) Wyatt Gooden	(United States) Wyatt Gooden	(United States) Wyatt Gooden

== Championship standings ==
Pos	Driver	VIR		WG1		MOH		LRP		WG2		Points
Drivers' championship
1	(United States) Bill Valet	3	3	**1**	2	6	7	1	DNS	3	3	322
2	(United States) Tim Kautz	4	**1**	2	**1**	4	3	DNF	DNF	7	6	317
3	(United States) Jim Goughary, Jr.	1	7	DNF	4	3	5	**DNF**	**DNF**	6	4	246
4	(United States) Arthur Foster	5	27	5	7	8	21	2	1	8	7	232
5	(United States) Colin Thompson	6	24	3	6			3	3	9	8	221
6	(United States) Wyatt Gooden					**1**	1			**1**	**1**	215
7	(Canada) Caitlin Johnston	7	6	8	8	13	11	5	7	11	16	202
8	(United States) Forrest Hull			4	5	10	22	4	DNF	10	9	181
9	(United States) John Robinson	2	2	6	3	7	DNF					178
10	(United States) Ryan Leach	24	8	DNF	24	22	20	DNF	2	2	2	162
11	(United States) Stephen Oseth	DNF	28			9	6	6	4	12	10	155
12	(United States) Mike Scanlan	10	13	DNS	9	11	8	7	12	21	DNS	152
13	(United States) Jon Groom			10	12	14	13	DNF	6	13	11	141
14	(United States) Jeremy Grenier					5	4			4	5	130
15	(United States) Sean Maisey	9	9	15	19	16	14	11	10	DNS		125
16	(Australia) Mitch Martin					2	**2**					89
17	(United States) Bob Detrick			DNF	14			14	5	14	13	82
18	(United States) Doug Stout	11	19	11	18					15	12	81
19	(United States) Ed Callo					17	16	15	8	20	20	77
20	(United States) Ross Devoe			DNS	11			9	9	DNS		65
21	(United States) Chris Keller			3						5	21	63
22	(Canada) Brian Graham	8	5									56
23	(United States) Ric Baribeault	19	12					13	13			52
24	(United States) Doug Hobby			13	16			8	DNF			51
25	(United States) Lewis Cooper, III	13	4									49
26	(United States) John Butkovich	17	14	12	17					DNS		48
26	(United States) Dan Pyanowski	21	21	17	15		18			DNF	17	48
28	(United States) Kevin Brumbaugh	15	22			18	19			19	18	45
29	(United States) Todd Bardwell			9	10							44
29	(United States) Jim Oseth					12	15			17	19	44
31	(United States) Jim MacNicholl							10	11			38
32	(United States) Samuel Beasley	**DNF**	10			19	23					35
33	(United States) Erik Shepard					15	DNS			16	14	34
34	(Canada) Steve Bamford		23			20	10					31
34	(United States) Steve Roux	23	17	14	20					DNS	DNS	31
36	(United States) Wes Allen					DNS	9					23
36	(United States) Len Amato	18	16		21							23
38	(United States) Dwight Rider	16	15									21
39	(United States) Jacob Carpenter	DNF	DNS			21	12			DNF	DNS	20
39	(United States) Jason Generotti		11									20
41	(United States) Jim Lee	14	20									19
41	(Canada) Greg Rice									18	15	19
43	(United States) Russ McBride	12	25									18
44	(United States) Shannon McIntosh			DNF	13							16
44	(United States) Glenn Taylor							12	DNF			16
46	(United States) Bill Maisey	20	18									14
46	(United States) Ralph Zuponcic			16	22							14
48	(United States) Michael Kolthoff					DNF	17					9
49	(United States) Brian Copperthite	22	26					DNF	DNF			6
50	(United States) David James			DNS	23							3

Color	Result
Gold	Winner
Silver	2nd place
Bronze	3rd place
Green	Other finishers
Purple	Did not finish
Red	Did not qualify (DNQ)
Brown	Withdrawn (Wth)
Black	Disqualified (DSQ)
White	Did not start (DNS)
Blank	Did not participate (DNP)
Blank	Not competing

**In-line notation**
**Bold**	Pole position (3 points)
Italics	Ran fastest race lap (2 points)
