= 2010 Volkswagen Jetta TDI Cup =

Seasons
- ← 2009 2011 →

The 2010 Volkswagen Jetta TDI Cup season was the third & final season of the Volkswagen Jetta TDI Cup. It consisted of seven race meetings with ten total races. JD Mobley won the championship by 21 points over Juan Pablo Sierra Lendle with two poles and two wins.

== Driver lineup ==
Name	Hometown
Rafael Navarro IV	Temecula, CA
Colin Thompson	Perkasie, PA
Arie Ouimet	Plymouth, MA
Michael Hogg	Vancouver, BC
Chris Wehrheim	Norcross, GA
Kevin Gleason	Johnstown, PA
JJ Tomlinson	Park City, UT
Taylor Tzouanakis	Wauconda, IL
Justine Jackson	Kingston, Jamaica
Wyatt Gooden	Cleveland, OH
Jarvis Gennari	Boca Raton, FL
Brian Whitmire	Baton Rouge, LA
Mike Mineo-Nardacci	East Hills, NY
AJ Severino	Hamilton, NJ
Jenna Wagner	Bristol, VA
Andrew Novich	Novato, CA
Nate Norenberg	Plymouth, MN
Taylor Broekemeier	Fort Collins, CO
JD Mobley	Castle Rock, CO
AJ Nealey	Edgewater, MD
Andrew Cordeiro	Woodbridge, ON
Ryan Ellis	Ashburn, VA
Jake Thompson	Calgary, AB
Juan Pablo Delgado	Orizaba, Mexico
Juan Pablo Sierra Lendle	Puebla, Mexico

== Season results ==
Rd.	Date	Track	Location	Pole position	Winning driver	Supporting
1	April 24	Virginia International Raceway	Danville, Virginia	Ryan Ellis	Ryan Ellis	Rolex Sports Car Series
2	April 25	Virginia International Raceway	Danville, Virginia	Ryan Ellis	Ryan Ellis	Rolex Sports Car Series
3	May 9	New Jersey Motorsports Park	Millville, New Jersey	Juan Pablo Sierra Lendle	Juan Pablo Sierra Lendle	co-headline with Trans-Am Series
4	June 6	Miller Motorsports Park	Tooele, Utah	Jake Thompson	Jake Thompson	co-headline with Trans-Am Series
5	June 20	Mid-Ohio Sports Car Course	Lexington, Ohio	Arie Ouimet	Wyatt Gooden	
6	August 1	Autobahn Country Club	Joliet, Illinois	Kevin Gleason	Wyatt Gooden	Trans-Am/Star Mazda
7	August 21	Road America	Elkhart Lake, Wisconsin	Chris Wehrheim	Jarvis Gennari	American Le Mans Series
8	August 22	Road America	Elkhart Lake, Wisconsin	Wyatt Gooden	Jarvis Gennari	American Le Mans Series
9	September 25	Autódromo Miguel E. Abed	Amozoc, Puebla, Mexico	JD Mobley	JD Mobley	
10	September 26	Autódromo Miguel E. Abed	Amozoc, Puebla, Mexico	JD Mobley	JD Mobley	
