= Colin Thompson (racing driver) =

American racing driver

- Born: February 17, 1994 (age 32) Doylestown, Pennsylvania, US
- Relatives: John Thompson (father)

Previous series
- 2015-2016 2013-2014 2012 2011 2010: Pirelli World Challenge; IMSA GT3 Cup Challenge; USF2000; F1600 Championship Series; Volkswagen Jetta TDI Cup

Colin Thompson (born February 17, 1994) is an American racing driver. After a career in single seaters, Thompson won the IMSA GT3 Cup Challenge Platinum Class in 2014 and the Pirelli World Challenge GT Cup in 2015. He is the son of 1989 American Racing Series driver John Thompson.

Thompson married Norwegian heiress Alexandra Andresen in September 2024.

== Racing career ==
Thompson started racing in quarter midgets at age five at his local Oaklane Speedway in Trumbauersville, Pennsylvania. In 2008, he won the Quarter Midget Association World Formula championship. After graduating the Skip Barber Racing School in 2009, Thompson raced in the Formula Skip Barber and Bertil Roos Racing Series. In the Bertil Roos Racing Series Thompson won his first race at New Jersey Motorsports Park.

For 2010, Thompson was selected as the youngest driver to compete in the Volkswagen Jetta TDI Cup. The Pennsylvania native finished 19th in the season standings. After running selected SCCA Formula Ford races in 2010, Thompson entered the 2011 F1600 Championship Series. In a Honda powered Swift DB6, Thompson achieved three podium finished. Three third placed at Watkins Glen and Lime Rock Park secured him a fifth place in the championship standings. In 2011, Thompson was a nominee for Team USA Scholarship. Thompson joined Belardi Auto Racing for the 2012 season. He started the season in the 2012 U.S. F2000 Winterfest. During the regular season, Thompson achieved eight top-ten finishes placing twelfth in the championship.

After his single seater career, Thompson moved into the IMSA GT3 Cup Challenge for 2013. In a privately funded team, the driver scored two podium finishes. For 2014, Thompson signed with Kelly-Moss Motorsports. Winning three races (two at Watkins Glen and one at Road Atlanta, Thompson won the championship. Thompson made a guest appearance in the Porsche Supercup. At Circuit of the Americas, supporting the 2014 United States Grand Prix, Thompson failed to finish. For 2015, Thompson remained at Kelly-Moss Motorsports for a Pirelli World Challenge GT Cup campaign. Scoring thirteen class wins out of eighteen races, Thompson dominated the championship. The following year Thompson remained in the series but promoted to the GT class. Racing with the McLaren Automotive supported K-Pax Racing, his best result was a fourth place at Circuit of the Americas in his McLaren 650S.

== Complete motorsports results ==
=== American Open-Wheel racing results ===
(key) (Races in bold indicate pole position, races in italics indicate fastest race lap)

==== USF2000 National Championship ====
Year	Entrant	1	2	3	4	5	6	7	8	9	10	11	12	13	14	Pos	Points
2012	Belardi Auto Racing	SEB; 8	SEB; 10	STP; 31	STP; 13	LOR; 14	MOH; 8	MOH; 28	ROA; 9	ROA; 10	ROA; 20	BAL; 12	BAL; 4	VIR; 10	VIR; 10	12th	103

=== Complete Porsche Supercup results ===
(key) (Races in bold indicate pole position) (Races in italics indicate fastest lap)

Year	Team	1	2	3	4	5	6	7	8	9	10	11	Pos.	Pts
2014	Kelly–Moss Motorsports	CAT	MON	RBR	SIL	GER	HUN	SPA	MNZ	USA; Ret	USA; DNS		NC	NC
2015	Market Leader by Project 1	CAT	MON	RBR	SIL	HUN	SPA	SPA	MNZ	MNZ	USA; C	USA; Ret	32nd	0
