= Lime Rock Park =

Motorsport road racing venue located in Lakeville, CT, US

"Road Racing Center of the East"

- Grand Prix Circuit (1957–present)
- Location: Lakeville, Connecticut, United States
- Coordinates: 41°55′39.68″N 73°23′0.95″W
- FIA Grade: 2
- Owner: Lime Rock Group, LLC (April 2021–present); Skip Barber (1984–April 2021)
- Operator: Lime Rock Group, LLC
- Broke ground: 1956
- Opened: 27 April 1957; 69 years ago
- Major events: Current: Trans-Am Series; Trans Am Memorial Day Classic (1967–1974, 1981, 1985–1989, 1992–1993, 1995–1999, 2002–2003, 2010, 2012–2015, 2019, 2021–present); NASCAR Truck Series; LiUNA! 150 (2025–present); ARCA Menards Series; Lime Rock Park 100 (2025–present); Future: Michelin Pilot Challenge (2006–2019, 2021–2023, 2027); Former: IMSA SportsCar Championship; Northeast Grand Prix (1958–1964, 1986–1992, 2004–2013, 2015–2019, 2021–2023); International Race of Champions (2024); Pirelli World Challenge (1992–1993, 1995–2005, 2007–2008, 2013, 2016–2018); Rolex Sports Car Series; Lime Rock Grand Prix (2000–2001, 2006–2008, 2010–2013); NASCAR K&N Pro Series East; K&N 100 (1993–2010)
- Website: https://limerock.com/

Grand Prix Circuit (1957–present)
- Surface: Asphalt
- Length: 1.530 mi (2.462 km)
- Turns: 7
- Race lap record: 0:45.105 ( (Argentina) Juan Manuel Fangio II, Eagle MkIII, 1993, IMSA GTP)
- Lime Rock Park Race Track
- U.S. National Register of Historic Places
- U.S. Historic district
- Location within Connecticut Location within the United States
- Area: 325.2 acres (131.6 ha)
- Built: 1956
- Built by: Jim Vaill
- Architectural style: Race track
- NRHP reference No.: 08001380
- Added to NRHP: October 16, 2009

Lime Rock Park is a natural-terrain motorsport road racing venue located in Lakeville, Connecticut, United States, a hamlet in the town of Salisbury, in the state's northwest corner. Built in 1956, it is the nation's third oldest continuously operating road racing venue, behind Road America (1955) and Willow Springs International Motorsports Park (1953). The track was owned by Skip Barber from 1984 to April 2021, a former race car driver who started the Skip Barber Racing School in 1975. Now, it is owned by Lime Rock Group, LLC. It was listed on the National Register of Historic Places in 2009.

== History ==
The 1.530 mi (2.462 km) Lime Rock track was originally conceived of in 1956 by Jim Vaill, who, along with John Fitch and Cornell Aeronautical Laboratory, built the track utilizing state-of-the-art road and highway safety principles of the time. The first race, a mix of G-Production class and an MG class, was held on April 28, 1957. The winner of the G-Production was Ted Sprigg in an Alfa Romeo Giulietta. The winner of the MG class was Charles Callanan in an MG TC.

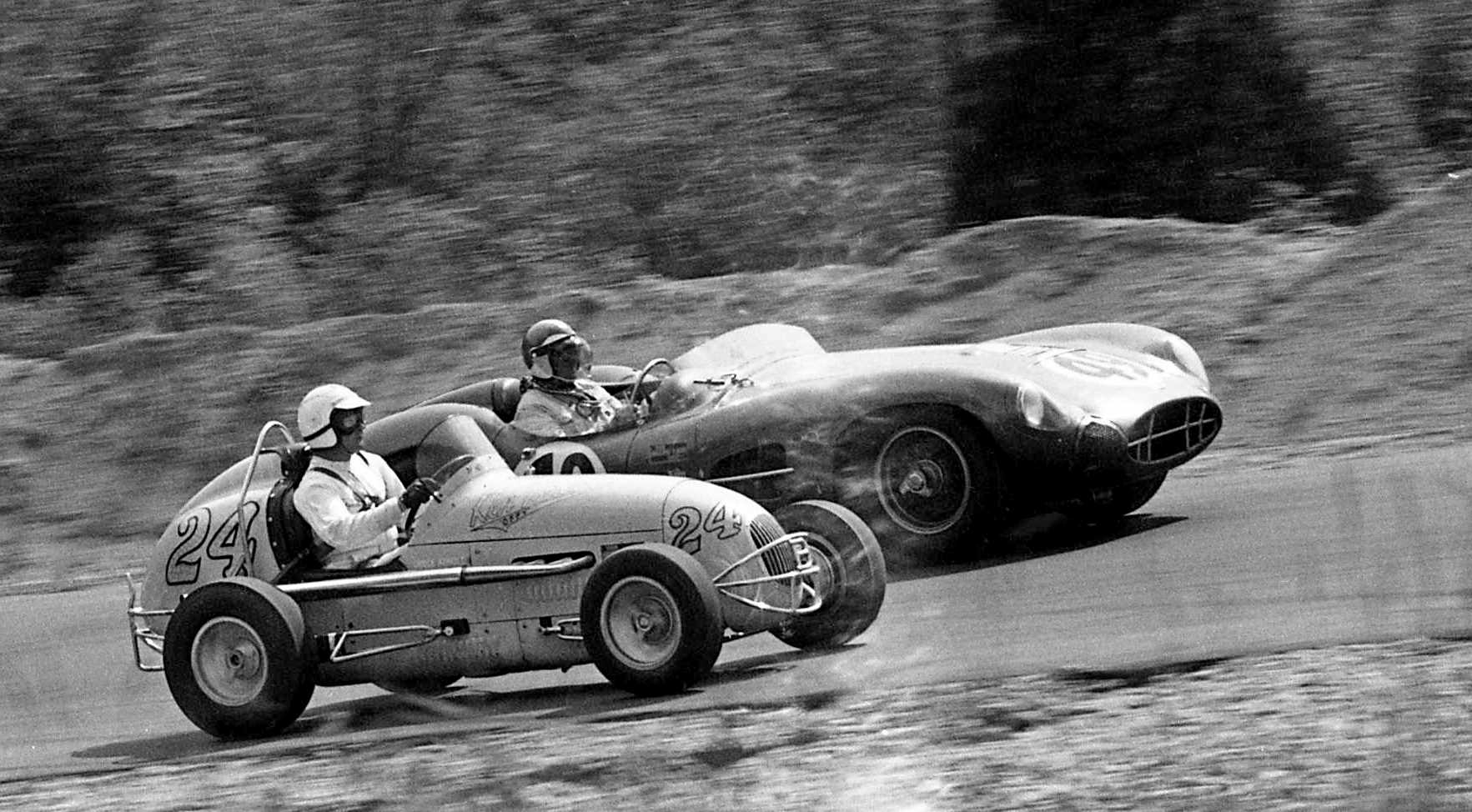
Rodger Ward (24) battles George Constantine in 1959

In 1959, Lime Rock was the site of a notable upset, when Rodger Ward won a Formula Libre race driving an Offenhauser-engined midget car, usually used on oval tracks. Ward used an advantageous power-to-weight ratio and his dirt-track cornering abilities to defeat several highly regarded sports cars and drivers for the victory. The year, the track also hosted the Little Le Mans race, won by Charles Callanan and Roger Penske in a Fiat Abarth. In 2008, the track was re-paved and two new corner complexes were added.

The track has a loyal following, though it did face some resistance from the local community shortly after it opened. In 1959, the Lime Rock Protective Association, with support from the nearby Trinity Episcopal Church, took the park to Litchfield Superior Court in an effort to ban Sunday racing. The court issued a permanent injunction against Sunday racing, and its decision was upheld by the Connecticut Supreme Court. While restrictive, the carefully crafted injunction was also enabling. It preserved the track's right to conduct unmuffled sports car racing on Fridays and Saturdays, plus testing on Tuesdays and other operating benefits. The injunction stands to this day.

The track has featured many well-known racers including Paul Newman, who supported his own Newman-Haas team with Bob Sharp, Mario Andretti, Stirling Moss, Dan Gurney, Sam Posey, and Mark Donohue. Other racers have included Parnelli Jones, Joey Logano, Austin Dillon, Simon Pagenaud, Alexander Rossi, and Tom Cruise. Posey and Newman have sections of the circuit named for them.

The Rolex Sports Car Series, American Le Mans Series and IMSA WeatherTech SportsCar Championship have used a configuration which included the chicane at turn five and West Bend.

== Track ==
The track is a natural terrain road course, constructed over hilly terrain in the Litchfield Hills, part of the greater Appalachian mountain range. The famous Appalachian Trail hiking route passes by the circuit on the ridge lines visible from the track a half mile to the east. The venue is somewhat unique in that it features no grandstands or bleacher seating, instead inviting fans to bring chairs and blankets and enjoy the racing from its grassy hillside areas under the shade of trees. While the venue is relatively compact, the short track is renowned for its spectator experience, offering fans an up close view and close quarters racing.

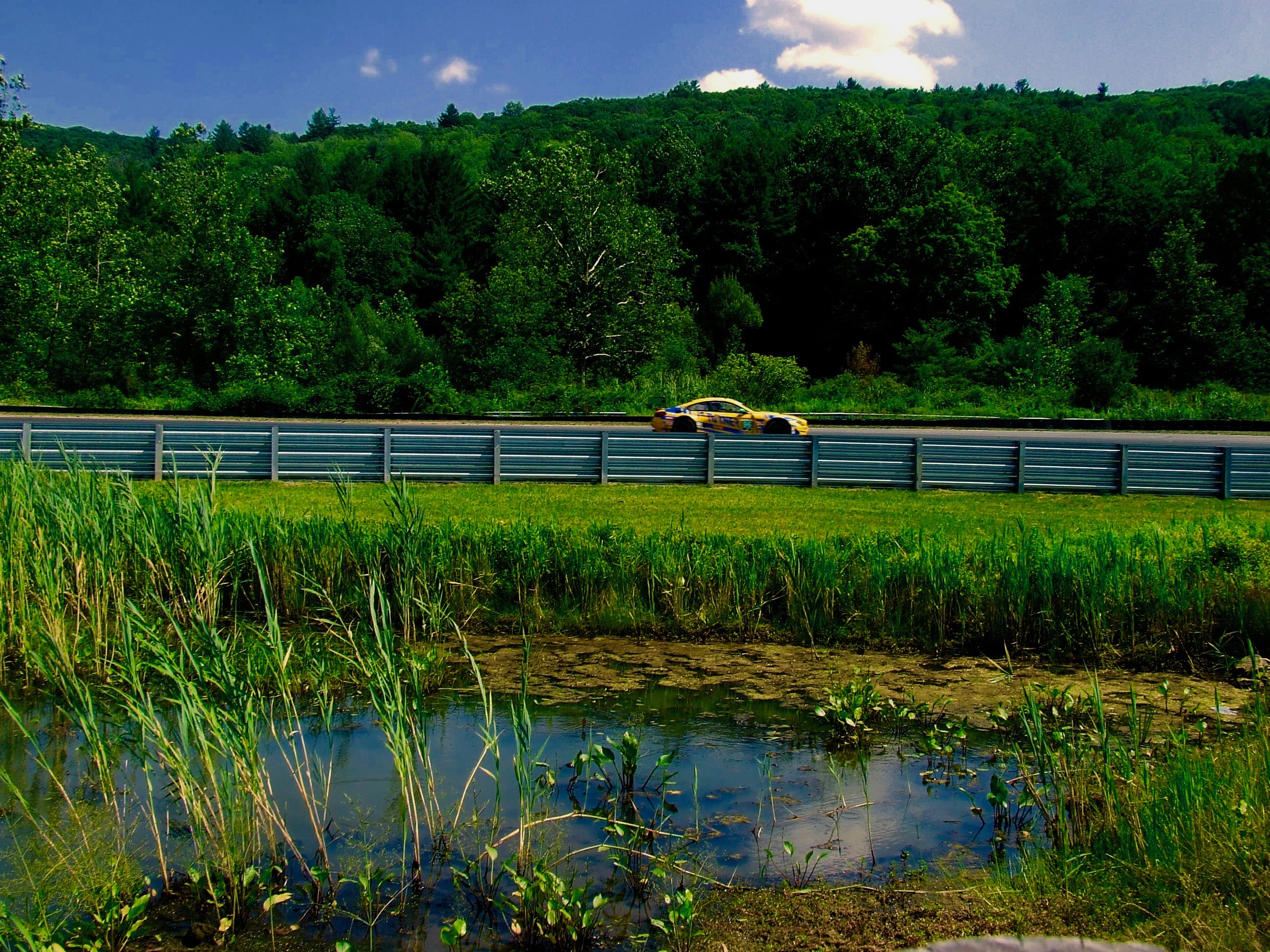
BMW M6 GT3 race car rounds "Big Bend", turns 1–2, at Lime Rock Park during an IMSA GT event

For years the track was listed as being 1.530 mi (2.462 km) in length—the story goes that right after it was built, somebody used the odometer in a Chevrolet to measure the track length—and 1.53 was taken as gospel. Following the 2008 reconstruction (see below), Lime Rock's operations people measured all four possible configurations, and as it turns out, each was 1.500 mi (2.414 km) long, plus or minus a few hundred feet. The IMSA Weathertech Sportscar Championship gives the distance of the track as 1.474 mi (2.372 km). The "classic" configuration is seven turns, while the three optional layouts are eight, nine and ten turns, respectively. The only left-hand turn in the "classic" layout is called "The Left-Hander." While all the other turns are to the right, the one after The Left-Hander is known as "The Right-Hander."

== Events ==
Current

- May: Trans-Am Series Trans Am Memorial Day Classic, Sportscar Vintage Racing Association Lime Rock SpeedTour
- July: NASCAR Truck Series LiUNA! 150, ARCA Menards Series Lime Rock Park 100, USF Juniors, ChampCar Endurance Series, National Auto Sport Association
- August: Radical Cup North America
- September: Lime Rock Historic Festival

Future

- IMSA VP Racing SportsCar Challenge (2023, 2027)
- Michelin Pilot Challenge
  - Northeast Grand Prix (2006–2019, 2021–2023, 2027)

Former

- American Le Mans Series
  - Northeast Grand Prix (2004–2013)
- Atlantic Championship Series (1978, 1980, 1985–1992, 2009)
- Barber Pro Series (1986–2002)
- Can-Am (1983–1985)
- F1600 Championship Series (2011–2013)
- F2000 Championship Series (2009–2013)
- Ferrari Challenge North America (1994–2001, 2003–2005, 2011–2013, 2016)
- Formula BMW Americas (2004, 2006–2009)
- Global MX-5 Cup (2003–2006, 2011)
- IMSA GT Championship
  - Lime Rock Grand Prix (1972–1998)
  - Northeast Grand Prix (1958–1964, 1986–1992)
- IMSA SportsCar Championship
  - Northeast Grand Prix (2015–2019, 2021–2023)
- International Race of Champions (2024)
- Lamborghini Super Trofeo North America (2013)
- NASCAR K&N Pro Series East
  - K&N 100 (1993–2010)
- NASCAR Whelen Modified Tour (2010–2011)
- North American Touring Car Championship (1996)
- Pirelli World Challenge
  - Lime Rock Park Grand Prix (1992–1993, 1995–2005, 2007–2008, 2013, 2016–2018)
- Rolex Sports Car Series
  - Lime Rock Grand Prix (2000–2001, 2006–2008, 2010–2013)
- SCCA L&M Continental 5000 Championship (1968–1972)
- SCCA National Sports Car Championship (1958–1964)
- USAC Road Racing Championship (1958–1959)
- Star Mazda Championship (2004)
- United States Road Racing Championship
  - Lime Rock Grand Prix (1999)

== Lap records ==
The fastest unofficial all-time track record set during a race weekend is 0:43.112 seconds, set by P. J. Jones in a Toyota Eagle MkIII, during qualifying for the 1993 Toyota Trucks Lime Rock Grand Prix. As of July 2026, the fastest official race lap records at Lime Rock Park are listed as:

| Category | Time | Driver | Vehicle | Event |
Grand Prix Circuit (1957–present): 1.530 mi (2.462 km)
| IMSA GTP | 0:45.105 | Juan Manuel Fangio II | Eagle MkIII | 1993 Lime Rock Grand Prix |
| LMP1 | 0:45.148 | Klaus Graf | HPD ARX-03a | 2012 Northeast Grand Prix |
| LMP2 | 0:45.371 | Ryan Briscoe | Porsche RS Spyder EVO | 2007 Northeast Grand Prix |
| Can-Am | 0:46.930 | Jacques Villeneuve Sr. | Frissbee GR3 | 1983 Can-Am Challenge at Lime Rock Park |
| LMPC | 0:48.480 | Colin Braun | Oreca FLM09 | 2013 Northeast Grand Prix |
| Star Mazda | 0:48.736 | C. R. Crews | Star Formula Mazda 'Pro' | 2004 Lime Rock Park Star Mazda Championship round |
| Formula Atlantic | 0:49.004 | Jeff Wood | Ralt RT4 | 1980 Lime Rock Formula Atlantic round |
| Daytona Prototype | 0:49.445 | Max Angelelli | Dallara DP01 | 2010 Memorial Day Classic |
| Group 5 | 0:49.540 | John Fitzpatrick | Porsche 935 K4 | 1982 Coca-Cola 400 |
| LMP3 | 0:49.715 | Bijoy Garg | Ligier JS P320 | 2023 Lime Rock IMSA VP Racing SportsCar Challenge round |
| WSC | 0:49.963 | Wayne Taylor | Ferrari 333 SP | 1995 Lime Rock Grand Prix |
| F5000 | 0:50.000 | Graham McRae | McRae GM1 | 1972 Lime Rock F5000 round |
| LMP900 | 0:50.145 | Jon Field | Lola B2K/10 | 2001 Dodge Dealers Grand Prix |
| F2000 Championship | 0:50.225 | Chris Livengood | Van Diemen RF99 | 2011 Lime Rock F2000 Championship round |
| TA1 | 0:50.296 | Paul Menard | Ford Mustang Trans-Am | 2025 Lime Rock Trans-Am round |
| IMSA GTO | 0:50.380 | Steve Millen | Nissan 300ZX | 1991 Lime Rock IMSA GT round |
| LM GTE | 0:50.746 | Mathieu Jaminet | Porsche 911 RSR-19 | 2021 Northeast Grand Prix |
| IMSA GTP Lights | 0:50.942 | Parker Johnstone | Spice SE91P | 1992 2 h Lime Rock |
| GT1 (GTS) | 0:50.971 | Johnny O'Connell | Chevrolet Corvette C6.R | 2007 Northeast Grand Prix |
| GT | 0:51.091 | Bill Auberlen | BMW M3 GT2 | 2012 Northeast Grand Prix |
| USF Juniors | 0:51.4910 | Edward Kennedy | Tatuus JR-23 | 2026 Lime Rock USF Juniors round |
| Formula BMW | 0:51.515 | Jonathan Summerton | Mygale FB02 | 2004 Lime Rock Formula BMW USA round |
| Radical Cup | 0:51.574 | Raiden Nicol | Radical SR3 XXR | 2025 Lime Rock Radical Cup North America round |
| GT3 | 0:51.629 | Julien Andlauer | Porsche 911 (992) GT3 R | 2023 Northeast Grand Prix |
| GT1 (Prototype) | 0:51.687 | David Brabham | Panoz GTR-1 | 1998 Lime Rock Grand Prix |
| IMSA GTX | 0:52.220 | David Hobbs | March-BMW M1/C | 1981 Coca-Cola 400 |
| TA2 | 0:52.483 | Mike Skeen | Ford Mustang Trans-Am | 2023 Lime Rock Trans-Am round |
| F1600 Championship | 0:52.848 | Colin Thompson | Swift DB6 | 2011 Lime Rock F1600 Championship round |
| LMP675 | 0:53.151 | Andy Lally | Lola B2K/40 | 2001 Dodge Dealers Grand Prix |
| IMSA GTU | 0:53.180 | Dorsey Schroeder | Dodge Daytona | 1988 Lime Rock IMSA GTU round |
| IMSA GTS | 0:53.700 | Darin Brassfield | Oldsmobile Cutlass Supreme | 1994 New England Dodge Dealers Grand Prix |
| Group 4 | 0:53.800 | Hurley Haywood | Porsche 934/5 | 1977 Lime Rock 100 Miles |
| GT4 | 0:54.077 | John Capestro-Dubets | Porsche 718 Cayman GT4 RS Clubsport | 2022 Lime Rock Park 120 |
| TCR Touring Car | 0:54.129 | Michael James Lewis | Hyundai i30 N TCR | 2018 Lime Rock Park Pirelli World Challenge round |
| IMSA GTS-1 | 0:54.410 | Irv Hoerr | Oldsmobile Cutlass Supreme | 1995 Dodge Dealers Grand Prix of Lime Rock |
| Barber Pro | 0:54.444 | Thed Björk | Reynard 98E | 2000 Lime Rock Barber Pro round |
| NASCAR Truck | 0:54.941 | Corey Heim | Toyota Tundra TRD Pro | 2025 LiUNA! 150 |
| ARCA Menards | 0:55.280 | Andrew Ranger | Chevrolet SS | 2026 Lime Rock Park ARCA 100 |
| IMSA GT | 0:55.400 | Al Holbert | Chevrolet Monza | 1976 Lime Rock 100 Miles |
| Porsche Carrera Cup | 0:55.429 | Jaap van Lagen | Porsche 911 (997) GT3 Cup 3.8 | 2011 Northeast Grand Prix |
| Super Touring | 0:55.892 | Dominic Dobson | Dodge Stratus | 1996 Lime Rock Park NATCC round |
| GT2 | 0:56.131 | João Barbosa | Mosler Intruder | 1999 Lime Rock Grand Prix |
| American GT | 0:56.914 | Eric Curran | Ford Mustang | 2000 Dodge Dealers Grand Prix |
| GT3 (1998–1999) | 0:56.997 | Rino Mastronardi | Mazda RX-7 | 1998 Lime Rock Grand Prix |
| All American Challenge | 0:57.020 | Dan Osterholt | Chevrolet Beretta | 1990 Jamesway 300 |
| Mustang Challenge | 0:57.022 | Will Lucas | Ford Mustang Dark Horse R | 2025 Lime Rock Mustang Cup round |
| IMSA GTS-2 | 0:57.253 | Bill Auberlen | BMW M3 (E36) | 1995 Dodge Dealers Grand Prix of Lime Rock |
| GTO | 0:57.344 | Terry Borcheller | Saleen Mustang | 2000 Dodge Dealers Grand Prix |
| GTU | 0:57.424 | Bill Auberlen | BMW M3 | 2000 Dodge Dealers Grand Prix |
| TC | 0:58.646 | Chip Herr | Audi A4 | 2007 Lime Rock Grand Prix |
| Ferrari Challenge | 1:01.042 | Kevin Crowder | Ferrari F355 Challenge | 1999 Lime Rock Ferrari Challenge North America round |
| IMSA Supercar | 1:02.244 | Shawn Hendricks | BMW M5 (E34) | 1995 Lime Rock IMSA Supercar round |

== Gallery ==
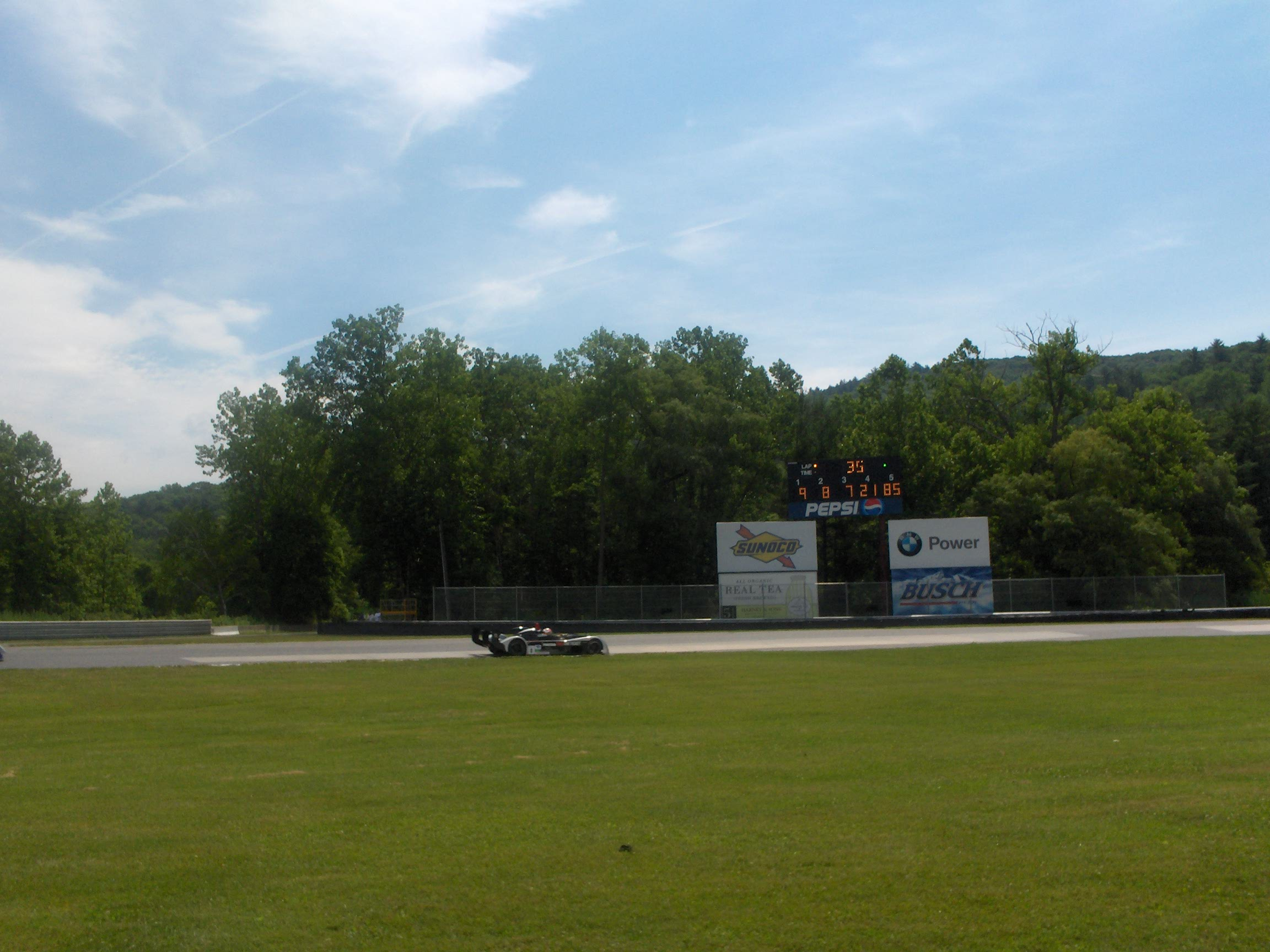
Lime Rock Park, Connecticut

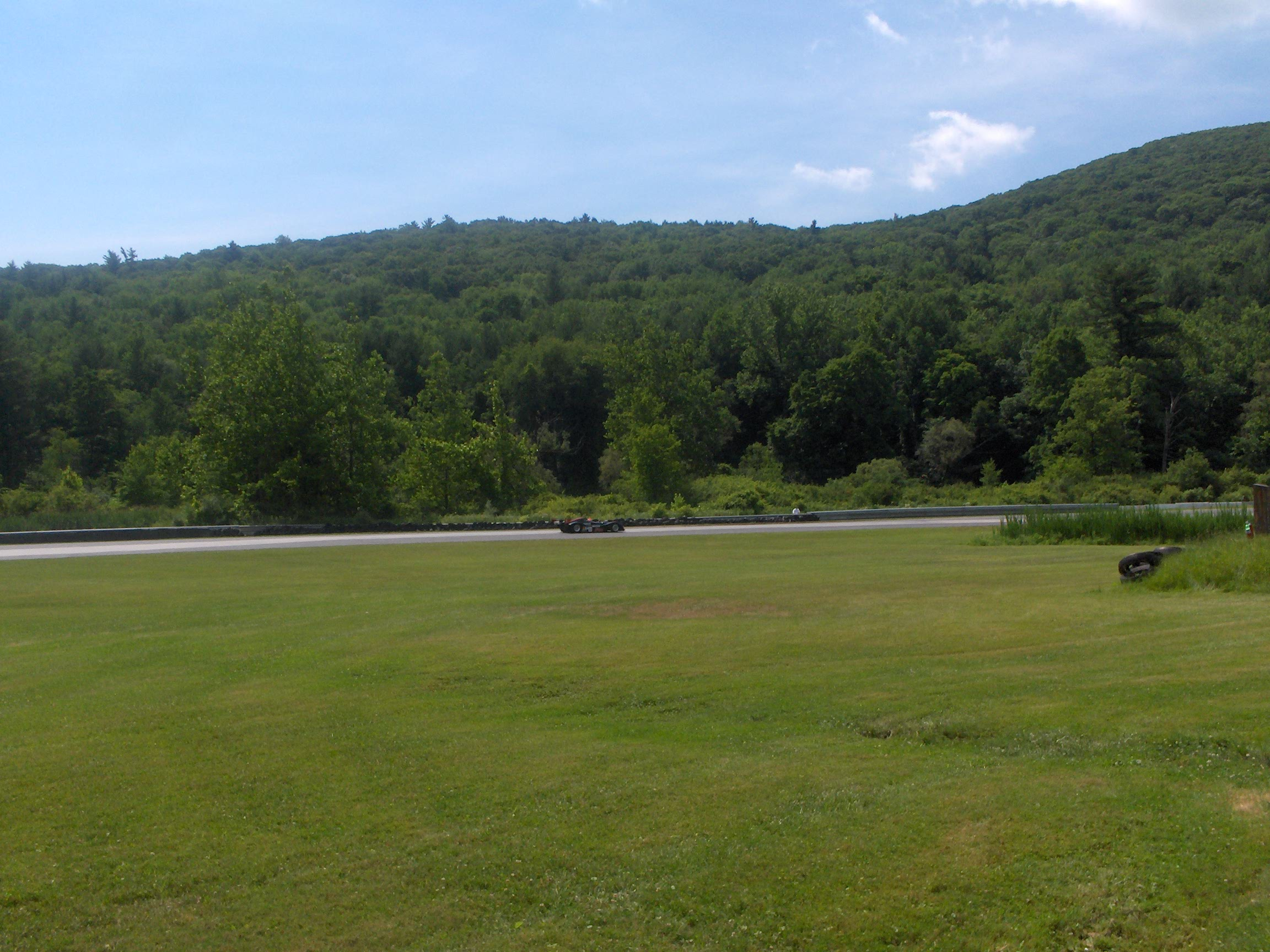
Lime Rock Park, Connecticut

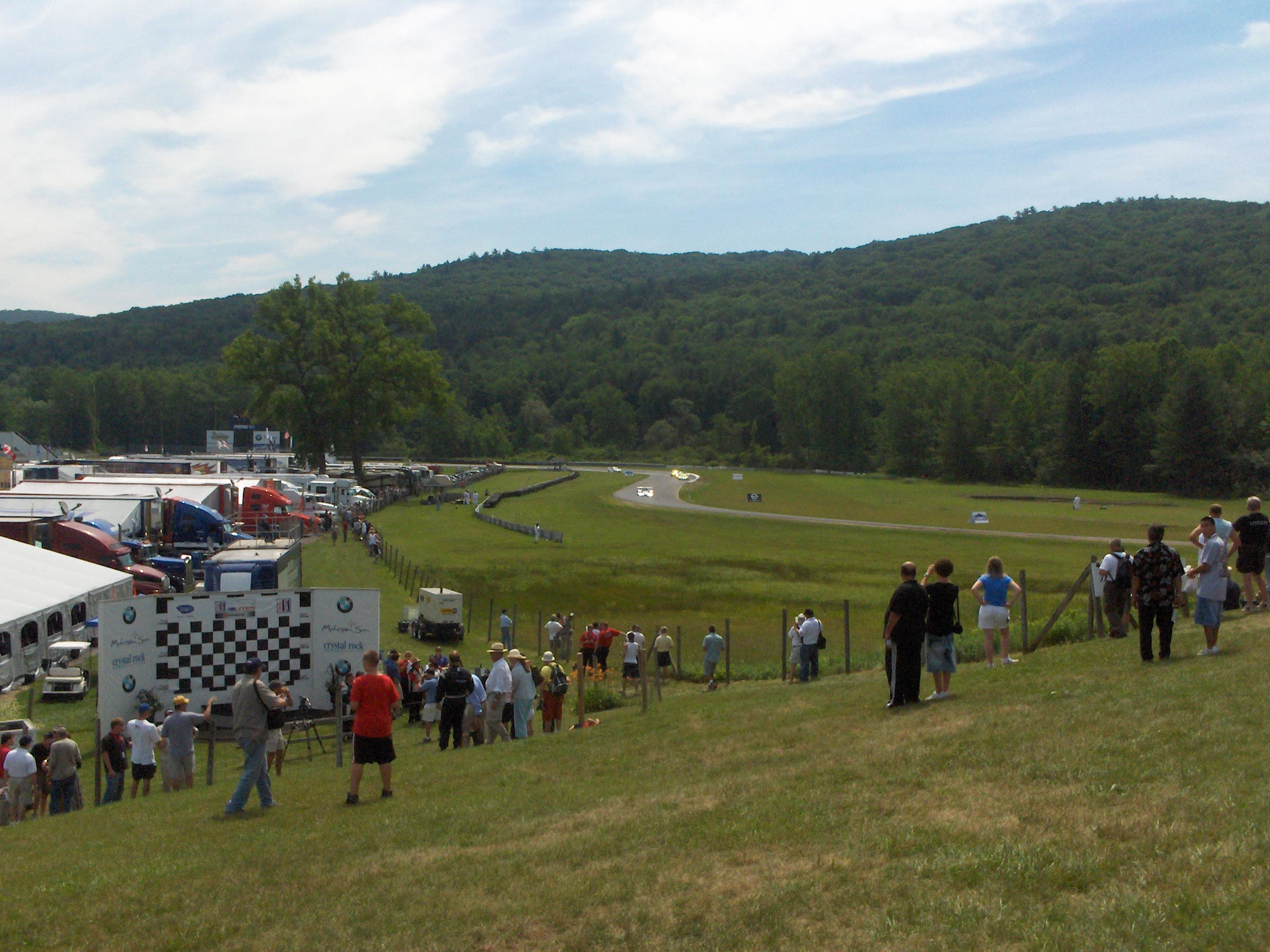
Lime Rock Park, Connecticut

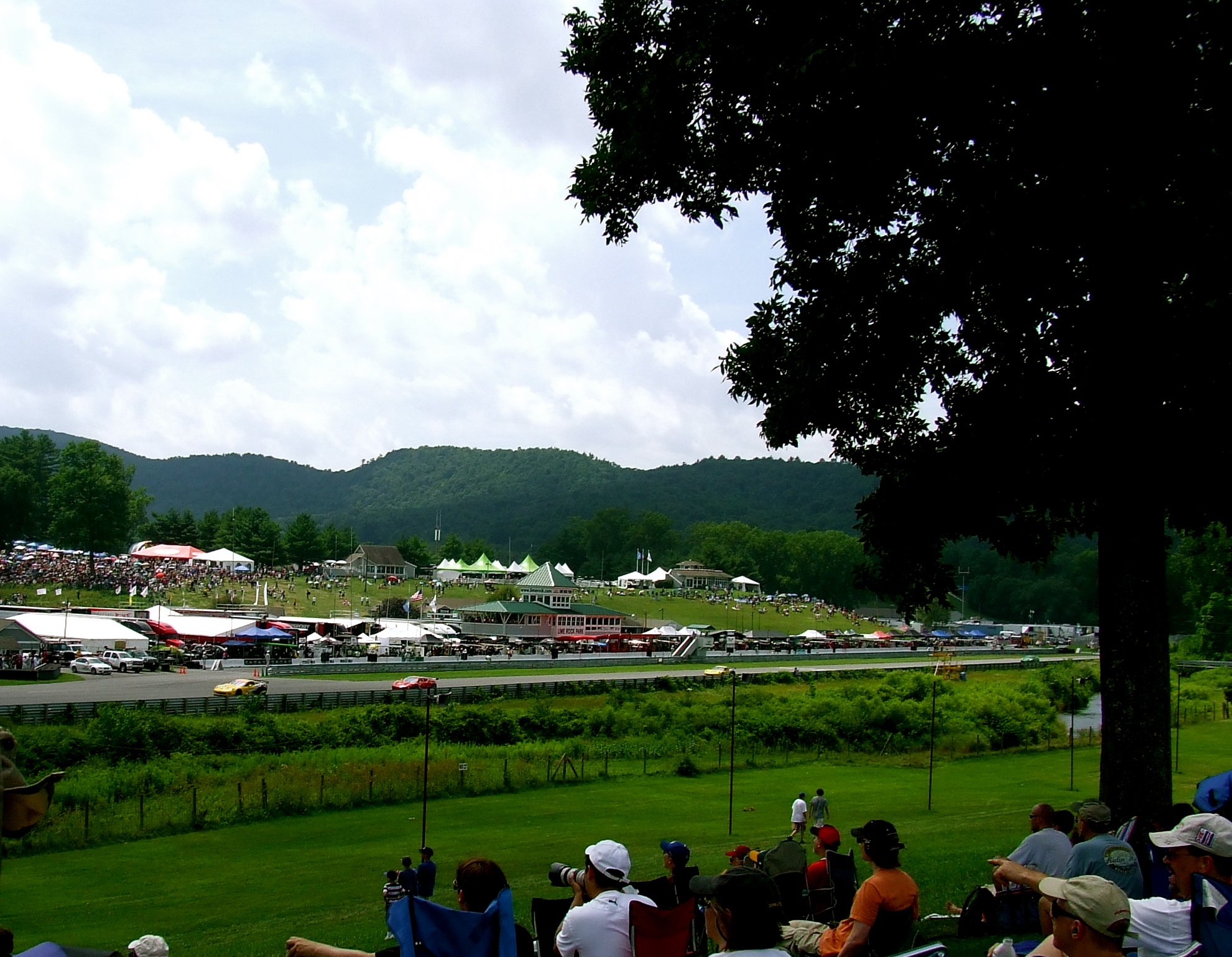
View from the Sam Posey Straight spectator area during an American Le mans Series event

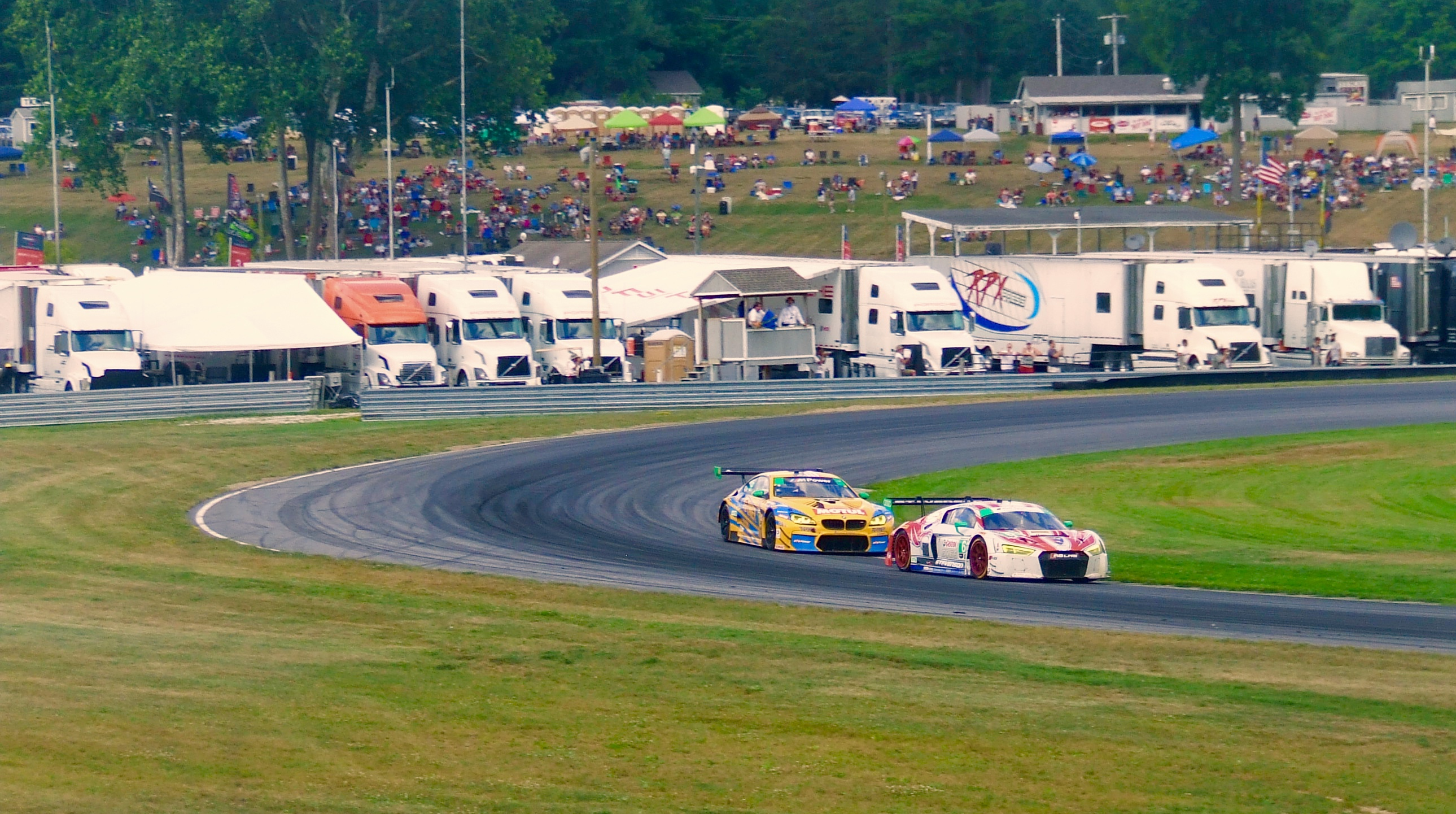
GT3 cars battle through "The Left Hander", turn 3, headed up towards Paul Newman Straight during an IMSA event at Lime Rock Park

== See also ==
- National Register of Historic Places listings in Litchfield County, Connecticut

== Bibliography ==
- Taylor, Rich (1992). Lime Rock Park: 35 Years of Racing. Sharon, CT: Sharon Mountain Press. ISBN 978-0-9633994-0-3.
- Kirby, Gordon (2018). Lime Rock Park: Six Decades of Speed, Beauty and Tradition. Lakeville, CT: Lime Rock Park. OCLC 1100913915.
- O'Neil, Terry (2022). Lime Rock Park: The Early Years 1955–1975. Deerfield, IL: Dalton Watson Fine Books. ISBN 978-1-85443-316-9.
