= 1998 Lime Rock Grand Prix =

Sports car race

Track map of Lime Rock Park

The 1998 Lime Rock Grand Prix was the third round of the 1998 IMSA GT Championship season and was held over two separate rounds, a WSC class race and a GT class race. The two separate races took place on May 25, 1998.

== WSC Results ==
Class winners in bold.

Pos	No	Team	Drivers	Chassis	Tyre	Laps	Sources
Pos	No	Team	Drivers	Engine	Tyre	Laps	Sources
1	**16**	**Dyson Racing**	**(United States) Butch Leitzinger (United Kingdom) James Weaver**	**Riley & Scott Mk III**	G	**117**	
1	**16**	**Dyson Racing**	**(United States) Butch Leitzinger (United Kingdom) James Weaver**	Ford 5.0L V8	G	**117**	
2	27	Doran Enterprises, Inc.	(Switzerland) Fredy Lienhard (Belgium) Didier Theys	Ferrari 333 SP	Y	117	
2	27	Doran Enterprises, Inc.	(Switzerland) Fredy Lienhard (Belgium) Didier Theys	Ferrari F310E 4.0L V12	Y	117	
3	7	Doyle-Risi Racing	(South Africa) Wayne Taylor (Belgium) Eric van de Poele	Ferrari 333 SP	P	117	
3	7	Doyle-Risi Racing	(South Africa) Wayne Taylor (Belgium) Eric van de Poele	Ferrari F310E 4.0L V12	P	117	
4	20	Dyson Racing	(United States) Elliot Forbes-Robinson (United States) Dorsey Schroeder	Riley & Scott Mk III	G	117	
4	20	Dyson Racing	(United States) Elliot Forbes-Robinson (United States) Dorsey Schroeder	Ford 5.0L V8	G	117	
5	39	Matthews-Colucci Racing	(United States) Tommy Kendall (United States) David Murry	Riley & Scott Mk III	P	116	
5	39	Matthews-Colucci Racing	(United States) Tommy Kendall (United States) David Murry	Ford 5.0L V8	P	116	
6	8	Transatlantic Racing Services	(United States) Scott Schubot (United States) Henry Camferdam	Riley & Scott Mk III	D	114	
6	8	Transatlantic Racing Services	(United States) Scott Schubot (United States) Henry Camferdam	Ford 5.0L V8	D	114	
7	63	Downing Atlanta	(United States) Howard Katz (United States) Jim Downing	Kudzu DLM	G	111	
7	63	Downing Atlanta	(United States) Howard Katz (United States) Jim Downing	Mazda 2.0L 3-Rotor	G	111	
8	36	Matthews-Colucci Racing	(United States) Jim Matthews (United States) Bill Dollahite	Riley & Scott Mk III	P	110	
8	36	Matthews-Colucci Racing	(United States) Jim Matthews (United States) Bill Dollahite	Ford 5.0L V8	P	110	
9 DNF	28	Intersport Racing	(United States) Jon Field (United States) Sam Brown	Riley & Scott Mk III	G	17	
9 DNF	28	Intersport Racing	(United States) Jon Field (United States) Sam Brown	Ford 5.0L V8	G	17	

== GT Results ==
Class winners in bold.

Pos	Class	No	Team	Drivers	Chassis	Tyre	Laps	Sources
Pos	Class	No	Team	Drivers	Engine	Tyre	Laps	Sources
1	**GT1**	**4**	**Panoz Motorsports**	**(United Kingdom) Andy Wallace (Australia) David Brabham**	**Panoz Esperante GTR-1**	**MI**	**112**	
1	**GT1**	**4**	**Panoz Motorsports**	**(United Kingdom) Andy Wallace (Australia) David Brabham**	Ford (Roush) 6.0L V8	**MI**	**112**	
2	GT1	5	Panoz Motorsports	(France) Éric Bernard (Brazil) Raul Boesel	Panoz Esperante GTR-1	**MI**	110	
2	GT1	5	Panoz Motorsports	(France) Éric Bernard (Brazil) Raul Boesel	Ford (Roush) 6.0L V8	**MI**	110	
3 DNF	GT1	2	Mosler Automotive	(United States) Shane Lewis (United States) Vic Rice	Mosler Raptor	?	107	
3 DNF	GT1	2	Mosler Automotive	(United States) Shane Lewis (United States) Vic Rice	Chevrolet 6.3L V8	?	107	
4	**GT2**	**6**	**Prototype Technology Group**	**(Belgium) Marc Duez (United States) Boris Said**	**BMW M3**	**Y**	**105**	
4	**GT2**	**6**	**Prototype Technology Group**	**(Belgium) Marc Duez (United States) Boris Said**	BMW 3.2L I6	**Y**	**105**	
5	**GT3**	**1**	**Prototype Technology Group**	**(Canada) Ross Bentley (United States) Peter Cunningham**	**BMW M3**	**Y**	**105**	
5	**GT3**	**1**	**Prototype Technology Group**	**(Canada) Ross Bentley (United States) Peter Cunningham**	BMW 3.2L I6	**Y**	**105**	
6	GT2	99	Schumacher Racing	(United States) Larry Schumacher (United States) Joe Varde	Porsche 911 GT2	**P**	104	
6	GT2	99	Schumacher Racing	(United States) Larry Schumacher (United States) Joe Varde	Porsche 3.6L Turbo Flat-6	**P**	104	
7	GT3	10	Prototype Technology Group	(United States) Bill Auberlen (United States) Mark Simo	BMW M3	**Y**	104	
7	GT3	10	Prototype Technology Group	(United States) Bill Auberlen (United States) Mark Simo	BMW 3.2L I6	**Y**	104	
8	GT3	23	Alex Job Racing	(United States) Cort Wagner (United States) Darryl Havens	Porsche 911 Carrera RSR	**P**	103	
8	GT3	23	Alex Job Racing	(United States) Cort Wagner (United States) Darryl Havens	Porsche 3.8L Flat-6	**P**	103	
9	GT3	71	Gordon Zimmerman	(United States) Steve Pfeffer (United States) Gordon Zimmerman	Porsche 911 Carrera RSR	?	102	
9	GT3	71	Gordon Zimmerman	(United States) Steve Pfeffer (United States) Gordon Zimmerman	Porsche 3.8L Flat-6	?	102	
10	GT3	24	Tim Vargo	(United States) Jake Vargo (United States) Brady Refenning	Porsche 911 Carrera RSR	**P**	100	
10	GT3	24	Tim Vargo	(United States) Jake Vargo (United States) Brady Refenning	Porsche 3.8L Flat-6	**P**	100	
11	GT2	00	David Friedman	(United States) Todd Snyder (United States) David Friedman	Porsche 993 Carrera RSR	?	99	
11	GT2	00	David Friedman	(United States) Todd Snyder (United States) David Friedman	Porsche 3.8L Flat-6	?	99	
12	GT3	98	Chris Mitchum	(United States) Spencer Pumpelly (United States) Matt Plumb	Porsche 911 Carrera RSR	?	99	
12	GT3	98	Chris Mitchum	(United States) Spencer Pumpelly (United States) Matt Plumb	Porsche 3.8L Flat-6	?	99	
13	GT3	81	Raymond Boissoneau	(Italy) Rino Mastronardi (United States) Raymond Boissoneau (Brazil) Nicolas Rondet	Mazda RX-7	?	97	
13	GT3	81	Raymond Boissoneau	(Italy) Rino Mastronardi (United States) Raymond Boissoneau (Brazil) Nicolas Rondet	Mazda 2.0L 3-Rotor	?	97	
14 DNF	GT3	22	Reisman Property Interests, Inc.	(United States) John Reisman (United States) Paul Reisman	Chevrolet Camaro	?	38	
14 DNF	GT3	22	Reisman Property Interests, Inc.	(United States) John Reisman (United States) Paul Reisman	Chevrolet 5.7L V8	?	38	
DNS	GT1	12	Bruce Barkelew	(United States) Brian Simo	Ford Mustang	?	-	
DNS	GT1	12	Bruce Barkelew	(United States) Brian Simo	Ford 4.6L V8	?	-	
