= Volkswagen Jetta TDI Cup =

- Category: Spec car racing
- Country: North America
- Inaugural season: 2008
- Folded: 2011
- Drivers: 25
- Tyre suppliers: Pirelli
- Last Drivers' champion: JD Mobley
- Official website: Official Website

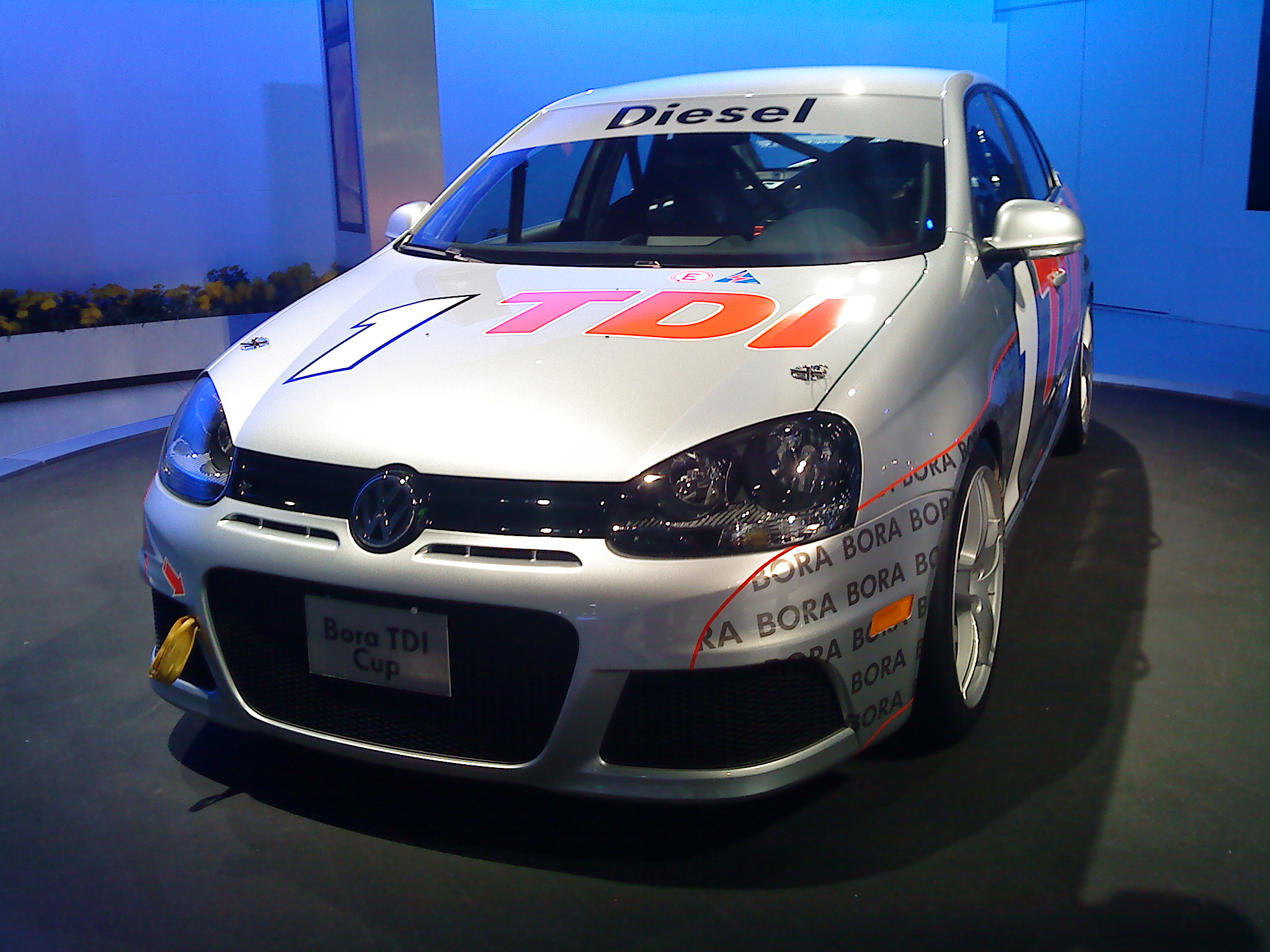
Jetta TDI car from German race series. (Jetta is called Bora in Germany)

The Volkswagen Jetta TDI Cup was a single-make racing series sanctioned by the Sports Car Club of America. The series was started in 2008 and was a sports car series that ran only in North America, the series quietly folded in 2011.

== Rules & prizes ==
The series was open to only drivers between the ages of 16 and 26 who were citizens of the United States, Canada, and/or Mexico. The entry fee for drivers is $45,000. In addition to more than $50,000 in prize money at stake during the season, the series champion received Volkswagen factory career advancement support with a value up to $100,000.

== Vehicles ==
The cars were 2009 Volkswagen Jettas that were modified by the factory for the series. Once completed, the cars were still about 70% stock with the other 30% made up of parts from the VW parts bin, one-off brackets and mounts, and race prepping from outside parties. The cars feature VW's DSG twin shaft, dual clutch automatic transmission and have height adjustable Sachs race suspension. Brakes were controlled by an ATE Racing ABS system and utilize Brembo 4 piston fixed calipers in front and Lucas 1 piston floating caliper disc brakes in the rear. The tires are racing slicks provided by Pirelli. The minimum race weight for the car with driver and equipment is 1,370 kg (3,020 lb). The safety equipment on each car included but was not limited to airbags, seat belts, roll cage, fire extinguishers, and an FIA rated racing seat.

=== Engine ===
Configuration
inline 4-cylinder 1,968 cc (120.1 cu in) TDI
Head
4 valves per cylinder, DOHC, compression ratio 18:1
Fuel system
Common-Rail Injection with 8 nozzle output, piezo elements, pressure up to 1850 bar
Aspiration
turbocharged, intercooled, water-cooled exhaust gas recirculation
Engine management
Bosch
exhaust
VW Catalyst and particulate filter
Output
125 kW (170 PS; 168 bhp) @ 4200 rpm, 368 ft-lbs @ 1900 to 2500 rpm
Data Acquisition
memotec Messtechnik

== Points system ==
The point system used was similar to other race series in that the most points are awarded to the first place finisher and points are reduced for subsequent finishing places. The Volkswagen Jetta TDI Cup is unique in that the points are halved for the first two races compared to the points for the rest of the season.

	Races 1 & 2	Races 3 through 7
1st place	30 points	60 points
2nd place	24 points	48 points
3rd place	20 points	40 points
4th place	17 points	34 points
5th place	16 points	32 points
6th place	15 points	30 points
7th place	14 points	28 points
8th place	13 points	26 points
9th place	12 points	24 points
10th place	11 points	22 points
11th place	10 points	20 points
12th place	9 points	18 points
13th place	8 points	16 points
14th place	7 points	14 points
15th place	6 points	12 points
16th place	5 points	10 points
17th place	4 points	8 points
18th place	3 points	6 points
19th place	2 points	4 points
20th place	1 point	2 points

== Champions ==
Season	Champion
2008	Josh Hurley
2009	Timmy Megenbier
2010	JD Mobley

== 2008 season results ==
Rd.	Date	Track	Pole Position	Winning driver
1	April 25–27, 2008	Virginia International Raceway	Josh Hurley	Mark Pombo
2	May 16–18, 2008	Mosport International Raceway	Josh Hurley	David Jurca
3	July 25–27, 2008	Portland International Raceway	Mark Pombo	Josh Hurley
4	August 14–17, 2008	Lime Rock Park	Michael Denino	Chris Castagna
5	September 19–20, 2008	Iowa Speedway	Jimmy Underhill	Jimmy Underhill
6	September 27–28, 2008	New Jersey Motorsports Park; Doubleheader race	Race #1 Shane Williams†; Race #2 Timmy Megenbier	Race #1 Shane Williams; Race #1 points David Jurca‡ Race #2 Liam Kenney††
7	October 1–3, 2008	Road Atlanta	Mark Pombo	Liam Kenney

† Shane Williams was a guest driver from the ADAC Polo Cup race series in Germany.
‡ David Jurca was awarded the points for a first place finish since Shane Williams did not accrue points in USA race. For points purposes 2nd, 3rd, and 4th place finishers were awarded the points for 1st, 2nd, and 3rd respectively. †† Liam Kenney was penalized 20 points for passing the leader, Josh Hurley under double yellow.
