= 2010 F2000 Championship Series =

2010 F2000 Championship season

Seasons
- ← 2009 2011 →

The 2010 F2000 Championship Series season marked the fifth season of competition in the series. It comprised 14 rounds (seven double-race weekends), beginning April 10 at Virginia International Raceway and concluding September 5 at Mid-Ohio Sports Car Course.

With six victories during the season, Victor Carbone finished it as the champion, 74 points clear of closest rival Cole Morgan, who took two wins. Daniel Erickson finished the season in third place, despite missing two early-season rounds at Road Atlanta and Mosport, taking a double win at Watkins Glen and Mid-Ohio. Jonathan Scarallo, Chris Livengood and Remy Audette took the other race wins as they all finished inside the top ten in the championship standings.

== Drivers and teams ==
The series released a 33-car entry list on March 29, 2010.

Team	No.	Driver	Chassis	Engine	Notes
(United States) K-Hill Motorsports	1	(United States) Cole Morgan	Van Diemen RF06	Zetec	In partnership with Greisiger Motorsports
(United States) K-Hill Motorsports	12	(United States) Bob Reid	Van Diemen RF04	Zetec	Road America only
(United States) K-Hill Motorsports	20	(United States) Matthew Inge	Van Diemen RF06	Zetec	Skipped Mosport, Lime Rock, & Road America
(United States) K-Hill Motorsports	42	(United Kingdom) James Winslow	Van Diemen RF06	Zetec	Watkins Glen race 1 only
(United States) Primus Racing	02	(Australia) Daniel Erickson	Van Diemen	Zetec	Skipped Mosport
(United States) Z-Sports	03	(United States) Tim Walsh	Van Diemen	Zetec	VIR & Road Atlanta only
(United States) GTP Motorsports	3	(United States) Phil Lombardi	Van Diemen RF01	Zetec	
(United States) GTP Motorsports	14	(United States) Blake Teeter	Van Diemen	Zetec	VIR to Mosport only
(United States) GTP Motorsports	16	(United States) Peter González	Van Diemen RF05	Zetec	Skipped Watkins Glen & Road America
(United States) GTP Motorsports	17	(Puerto Rico) Félix Serrallés	Van Diemen RF03	Zetec	Lime Rock only
(United States) GTP Motorsports	69	(United States) Paul Farmer	Mygale SJ05	Zetec	Skipped Road America
(United States) GTP Motorsports	70	(United States) Tom Fatur	Van Diemen RF03	Zetec	Skipped Mosport & Road America
(United States) GTP Motorsports	86	(United States) Jim Hanrahan	Van Diemen	Zetec	Lime Rock only
(United States) ArmsUp Motorsports	4	(United States) Rich Balsley	Van Diemen RF07	Zetec	Road America only
(United States) R-Sport	5	(United States) Keith McCrone	Van Diemen RF01	Zetec	
(United States) R-Sport	22	(United States) Jonathan Scarallo	Van Diemen RF01	Zetec	
(United States) SMR Motorsports	06	(United States) Timothy Paul	Van Diemen RF02	Zetec	Skipped Mosport
(United States) SMR Motorsports	14	(United Kingdom) Stevan McAleer	Van Diemen	Zetec	Watkins Glen onwards
(United States) Lap 2 Racing (Barbados) 8000Inc Racing	7	(Barbados) Brent Gilkes	Van Diemen RF03	Zetec	Skipped Road America
(United States) St. Clair Motorsports	8	(United States) Mark Defer	Van Diemen	Zetec	Skipped Mosport and Lime Rock
(United States) St. Clair Motorsports	42	(United States) Bill Jordan	Van Diemen RF06	Zetec	Skipped Mosport and Lime Rock
(United States) St. Clair Motorsports	51	(United States) Dan Denison	Van Diemen RF05	Zetec	Skipped Road America
(United States) St. Clair Motorsports	97	(United States) Chris Gumprecht	Van Diemen RF02	Zetec	Skipped Mosport
(United States) Dole Fuels Racing	08	(United States) John Dole	Van Diemen RF99	Zetec	Lime Rock only
(United States) JDC MotorSports	10	(Russia) Mikhail Goikhberg	Van Diemen RF01	Zetec	VIR, Road Atlanta, & Road America only
(United States) JDC MotorSports	55	(United States) Gerry Kraut	Van Diemen RF03	Zetec	VIR, Road Atlanta, & Road America only
(United States) Company Motorsports	11	(United States) Jesse Yorio	Piper DF-5	Zetec	Skipped Road Atlanta & Road America
(United States) Company Motorsports	25	(United States) Jeff McCusker	Piper DF-5; Van Diemen RF01	Zetec	Skipped Road America
(United States) John LaRue	17	(United States) John LaRue	Citation	Zetec	VIR only
(Canada) Audette Racing	21	(Canada) Remy Audette	Van Diemen RF08	Zetec	VIR to Mosport only
(United States) Alegra Motorsports	23	(Brazil) Victor Carbone	Van Diemen RF02	Zetec	
(United States) Alegra Motorsports	26	(Brazil) Fabio Orsolon	Van Diemen RF03	Zetec	
(United States) Clawson Motorsports	27	(United States) Craig Clawson	Van Diemen RF01	Zetec	
(United States) AcceleRace Motorsports	28	(United States) Ardie Greenamyer	Van Diemen RF02	Zetec	Skipped Road America
(United States) AcceleRace Motorsports	4	(United States) Chris Camadella	Van Diemen	Zetec	Watkins Glen only
(United States) Len Amato	33	(United States) Len Amato	Van Diemen RF01	Zetec	Skipped Mosport, Lime Rock, Road America
(United States) Liberty Motorsports	36	(United States) Tim Kautz	Van Diemen RF06	Zetec	VIR & Road Atlanta only
(United States) Liberty Motorsports	41	(United States) Brian Belardi	Van Diemen RF06	Zetec	VIR, Road Atlanta, & Road America only
(United States) Liberty Motorsports	80	(United States) Bobby Caldwell	Van Diemen RF00	Zetec	In partnership with Caldwell Racing
(United States) Liberty Motorsports	85	(United States) Zach Craigo	Van Diemen	Zetec	Joined at Mosport, skipped Lime Rock
(United States) Work Racing	37	(United States) Chris Livengood	Van Diemen RF00	Pinto	
(United States) McLaughlin Motorsports	57	(United States) Billy McLaughlin	Van Diemen RF06	Zetec	VIR & Road Atlanta only
(United States) Weitzenhof Racing	67	(United States) Dave Weitzenhof	Citation	Zetec	VIR to Mosport only
(United States) Vaughn Horvath	73	(United States) Vaughn Horvath	Van Diemen RF97	Pinto	Skipped Lime Rock
(United States) Fat Boy Racing	83	(United States) Charles Finelli	Van Diemen RF02	Zetec	Skipped Mosport, Lime Rock race 2, & Road America
(United States) Fat Boy Racing	83	(United States) Brendan Puderbach	Van Diemen RF02	Zetec	Lime Rock race 2 only
(United States) Ski Motorsports	88	(United States) Tim Minor	Van Diemen RF98	Zetec	Skipped Road America
(United States) K-FAST	89	(United States) Rob Nicholas	Van Diemen RF01	Zetec	Skipped Mosport, Lime Rock, & Road America
(United States) ADSA/Wright Racing	90	(United States) Robert Wright	Van Diemen RF03	Zetec	
(United States) ADSA/Wright Racing	94	(United States) Al Guibord, Sr.	Van Diemen RF02	Zetec	Skipped Lime Rock and Road America
(United States) ADSA/Wright Racing	95	(United States) Al Guibord, Jr.	Van Diemen RF02	Zetec	Skipped Mosport and Lime Rock

== Race calendar and results ==
Round	Circuit	Location	Date	Pole position	Fastest lap	Winning driver	Winning team
1	Virginia International Raceway	(United States) Alton, Virginia	April 10	(Australia) Daniel Erickson	(United States) Cole Morgan	(Brazil) Victor Carbone	(United States) Alegra Motorsports
2	Virginia International Raceway	(United States) Alton, Virginia	April 11	(Australia) Daniel Erickson	(United States) Jonathan Scarallo	(United States) Cole Morgan	(United States) K-Hill Motorsports
3	Road Atlanta	(United States) Braselton, Georgia	May 7	(Brazil) Victor Carbone	(United States) Rob Nicholas	(Brazil) Victor Carbone	(United States) Alegra Motorsports
4	Road Atlanta	(United States) Braselton, Georgia	May 8	(Brazil) Victor Carbone	(Brazil) Victor Carbone	(Brazil) Victor Carbone	(United States) Alegra Motorsports
5	Mosport International Raceway	(Canada) Bowmanville, Ontario	June 12	(Canada) Remy Audette	(Canada) Remy Audette	(Canada) Remy Audette	(Canada) Audette Racing
6	Mosport International Raceway	(Canada) Bowmanville, Ontario	June 13	(Brazil) Victor Carbone	(Brazil) Victor Carbone	(Brazil) Victor Carbone	(United States) Alegra Motorsports
7	Watkins Glen International	(United States) Watkins Glen, New York	July 3	(United States) Chris Livengood	(United States) Cole Morgan	(Australia) Daniel Erickson	(United States) Primus Racing
8	Watkins Glen International	(United States) Watkins Glen, New York	July 4	(Australia) Daniel Erickson	(Brazil) Victor Carbone	(Australia) Daniel Erickson	(United States) Primus Racing
9	Lime Rock Park	(United States) Lakeville, Connecticut	July 23	(United States) Keith McCrone	(Australia) Daniel Erickson	(United States) Cole Morgan	(United States) K-Hill Motorsports
10	Lime Rock Park	(United States) Lakeville, Connecticut	July 24	(Brazil) Victor Carbone	(Australia) Daniel Erickson	(Brazil) Victor Carbone	(United States) Alegra Motorsports
11	Road America	(United States) Elkhart Lake, Wisconsin	August 7	(Australia) Daniel Erickson	(Brazil) Victor Carbone	(Brazil) Victor Carbone	(United States) Alegra Motorsports
12	Road America	(United States) Elkhart Lake, Wisconsin	August 8	(United States) Jonathan Scarallo	(United States) Jonathan Scarallo	(United States) Jonathan Scarallo	(United States) R-Sport
13	Mid-Ohio Sports Car Course	(United States) Lexington, Ohio	September 4	(Brazil) Victor Carbone	(United States) Chris Livengood	(United States) Chris Livengood	(United States) Work Racing
14	Mid-Ohio Sports Car Course	(United States) Lexington, Ohio	September 5	(Brazil) Victor Carbone	(United States) Chris Livengood	(Australia) Daniel Erickson	(United States) Primus Racing

== Final standings ==
Pos	Driver	VIR (United States)		ATL (United States)		MOS (Canada)		WGI (United States)		LRP (United States)		ROA (United States)		MID (United States)		Total	Drop	Points
1	(Brazil) Victor Carbone	1	4	**1**	**1**	4	**1**	5	2	Ret	**1**	1	7	**5**	**3**	562	27	535
2	(United States) Cole Morgan	4	1	3	Ret	3	2	4	3	1	9	10	4	3	2	482	21	461
3	(Australia) Daniel Erickson	**2**	**10**					1	**1**	12	2	**2**	2	9	1	395		395
4	(United States) Phil Lombardi	7	30	6	3	2	5	10	8	3	3	8	6	7	5	398	21	377
5	(United States) Keith McCrone	17	6	11	5	6	6	7	5	**4**	13	6	3	21	Ret	327	5	322
6	(Brazil) Fabio Orsolon	3	3	2	22	Ret	DNS	9	10	Ret	4	7	5	4	9	314		314
7	(United States) Jonathan Scarallo	6	7	25	2	DNS	DNS	13	12	7	6	21	**1**	20	4	289		289
8	(United States) Chris Livengood	9	21	15	7	Ret	9	**2**	4	26	DNS	5	21	1	7	286		286
9	(United States) Tim Minor	10	Ret	5	4	5	4	3	6	5	5			22	DNS	283		283
10	(Canada) Remy Audette	5	2			**1**	3							2	6	236		236
11	(United States) Bobby Caldwell	12	9	17	26	17	8	12	9	11	10	Ret	11	13	12	215	1	214
12	(United Kingdom) Stevan McAleer							11	7	2	7	3	10			153		153
13	(United States) Rob Nicholas	DNS	5	4	24			6	Ret					6	8	153		153
14	(United States) Craig Clawson	20	18	24	14	10	Ret	17	15	13	14	17	14	17	18	138	3	135
15	(United States) Dave Weitzenhof	15	11			7	7							8	10	130		130
16	(United States) Mark Defer	19	13	14	8			Ret	14			20	18	10	19	116		116
17	(United States) Tom Fatur	29	12	18	12			Ret	19	9	Ret			11	11	113		113
18	(United States) Robert Wright	21	14	27	16	9	Ret	28	28	18	Ret	13	23	14	14	108	2	106
19	(United States) Gerry Kraut			12	6							9	8			94		94
20	(United States) Ardie Greenamyer	16	16	10	10	16	DNS	26	18	19	Ret			Ret	Ret	91		91
21	(United States) Jeff McCusker	Ret	20					18	20	8	12			15	15	84		84
22	(United States) Chris Gumprecht	8	Ret	7	28			19	16	14	Ret	DNS	DNS			83		83
23	(United States) Peter González	18	DNS	16	18	11	10			23	17					78		78
24	(United States) Tim Kautz	14	8	13	9											76		76
25	(Barbados) Brent Gilkes	27	17	26	DNS	8	11	16	Ret	16	Ret					76		76
26	(United States) Paul Farmer	30	22	DNS	15	18	DNS	20	19	15	15			19	16	76		76
27	(United States) Al Guibord, Jr.	13	25					22	11			12	12			73		73
28	(United States) Dan Denison			20	11	12	Ret	29	23	22	20			16	DNS	67		67
29	(Russia) Mikhail Goikhberg			28	21							4	9			62		62
30	(United States) Bill Jordan	24	24	19	23							19	17	12	13	62		62
31	(United States) Jesse Yorio	11	26			Ret	15	14	13	25	DNS					61		61
32	(United States) Zach Craigo					13	12	21	22			18	20			55		55
33	(United States) Brian Belardi			8	25							16	13			51		51
34	(United States) Blake Teeter			21	13	15	14									44		44
35	(United States) Al Guibord, Sr.	25	28	22	20	14	13	25	27							42		42
36	(United States) Bob Reid							24	26	17	16	14	19			42		42
37	(United States) John Dole									10	11					40		40
38	(United States) Matthew Inge			9	19											30		30
39	(United States) Tim Paul	22	27	23	17			Ret	25	24	DNS	22	22			29		29
40	(United States) Charles Finelli	Ret	DNS					15	17	Ret	DNS					21		21
41	(United States) Billy McLaughlin	23	15													14		14
42	(United States) Chris Keller	DNS	19													7		7
43	(United States) Tim Walsh	26	23													4		4
44	(United States) Len Amato	28	Ret													1		1
Pos	Driver	VIR (United States)		ATL (United States)		MOS (Canada)		WGI (United States)		LRP (United States)		ROA (United States)		MID (United States)		Total	Drop	Points

Color	Result
Gold	Winner
Silver	2nd place
Bronze	3rd place
Green	4th & 5th place
Light Blue	6th–10th place
Dark Blue	Finished (Outside Top 10)
Purple	Did not finish
Red	Did not qualify (DNQ)
Brown	Withdrawn (Wth)
Black	Disqualified (DSQ)
White	Did not start (DNS)
Blank	Did not participate (DNP)
Blank	Not competing

**In-line notation**
**Bold**	Pole position (3 points)
Italics	Ran fastest race lap (2 points)

- Full Results
- This list only contains drivers who registered for the championship.
