= 2013 F2000 Championship Series =

2013 F2000 Championship season

Seasons
- ← 2012 2014 →

The 2013 F2000 Championship Series season was the eighth season of competition in the series. It consisted of 14 rounds (seven double-race weekends), beginning April 11 at Virginia International Raceway and concluding August 25 at Summit Point Raceway. The race schedule was largely un-changed from the previous year, as only the round at New Jersey Motorsports Park was eliminated and a second weekend at the Mid-Ohio Sports Car Course was added.

Tim Minor clinched the championship after the fourth race at Mid-Ohio, becoming the first Masters Class driver to win the overall championship as well as being becoming the first series champion not to drive a Van Diemen chassis. Minor drove a Citation chassis to victory nine times on his way to the championship and finished either first or second in all but one race. 22-year-old Floridian Kyle Connery won four times and finished second in the championship.

== Race calendar and results ==
Round	Circuit	Location	Date	Pole position	Fastest lap	Winning driver	Winning team
1	Virginia International Raceway	(United States) Alton, Virginia	April 11–14	(United States) Tim Minor	(United States) Tim Minor	(United States) Tim Minor	(United States) Ski Motorsports
2	Virginia International Raceway	(United States) Alton, Virginia	April 11–14	(United States) Tim Minor	(United States) Tim Minor	(United States) Tim Minor	(United States) Ski Motorsports
3	Road Atlanta	(United States) Braselton, Georgia	May 9–11	(United States) Kyle Connery	(United States) Kyle Connery	(United States) Tim Minor	(United States) Ski Motorsports
4	Road Atlanta	(United States) Braselton, Georgia	May 9–11	(United States) Tim Minor	(United States) Tim Minor	(United States) Tim Minor	(United States) Ski Motorsports
5	Lime Rock Park	(United States) Lakeville, Connecticut	May 24–25	(United States) Tim Minor	(United States) Tim Minor	(United States) Tim Minor	(United States) Ski Motorsports
6	Lime Rock Park	(United States) Lakeville, Connecticut	May 24–25		(United States) Kyle Connery	(United States) Kyle Connery	(United States) James Lee Racing
7	Watkins Glen International	(United States) Watkins Glen, New York	June 27–29	(United States) Kyle Connery	(United States) Kyle Connery	(United States) Tim Minor	(United States) Ski Motorsports
8	Watkins Glen International	(United States) Watkins Glen, New York	June 27–29		(United States) Tim Minor	(United States) Kyle Connery	(United States) James Lee Racing
9	Mid-Ohio Sports Car Course	(United States) Lexington, Ohio	July 26–28	(United States) Tim Minor	(United States) Kyle Connery	(United States) Kyle Connery	(United States) James Lee Racing
10	Mid-Ohio Sports Car Course	(United States) Lexington, Ohio	July 26–28	(United States) Santino Ferrucci	(United States) Tim Minor	(United States) Tim Minor	(United States) Ski Motorsports
11	Mid-Ohio Sports Car Course	(United States) Lexington, Ohio	August 9–11	(United States) John LaRue	(United States) Tim Minor	(United States) Kyle Connery	(United States) James Lee Racing
12	Mid-Ohio Sports Car Course	(United States) Lexington, Ohio	August 9–11	(United States) Tim Minor	(United States) Joey Selmants	(United States) John LaRue	(United States) John LaRue Racing
13	Summit Point Motorsports Park	(United States) Summit Point, West Virginia	August 23–25	(United States) Tim Minor	(United States) Tim Minor	(United States) Tim Minor	(United States) Ski Motorsports
14	Summit Point Motorsports Park	(United States) Summit Point, West Virginia	August 23–25		(United States) Tim Minor	(United States) Tim Minor	(United States) Ski Motorsports

== Championship standings ==
Pos	Driver	VIR		ATL		LRP		WGL		MOH		MOH		SUM		Points
Drivers' championship
1	(United States) Tim Minor **(M)**	**1**	**1**	1	**1**	**1**	14	1	2	**2**	1	2	**2**	**1**	**1**	616
2	(United States) Kyle Connery	2	6	**2**	DNS	18	1	**2**	**1**	1	3	1	6	27	4	452
3	(United States) David Grant	5	8	3	2	5	4	4	5	3	28	4	3	2	25	415
4	(Brazil) Roberto Lorena	DSQ	2	4	20	3	2	5	7	15	7	6	13	6	3	347
5	(United States) Santino Ferrucci							3	4	5	**2**	5	5	3	2	288
6	(Canada) Steve Bamford **(M)**	13	13	8	6	12	17	9	9	4	10	16	9	9	6	277
7	(Italy) Federico Mosconi	7	3	9	17	8	3	36	8	11	11	10	26	4	21	273
8	(United States) Kevin Kopp	3	4	20	4	2	18	21	12	13	12	27	8	5	26	266
9	(United States) Tom Fatur **(M)**	26	14			11	7	11	10			9	11	8	12	184
10	(United States) Jim Libecco	22	23	7	15	17	21	32	13	8	4	7	7	26	19	178
11	(United States) Dave Weitzenhof **(M)**	9	9	12	5	DNS	DNS			DNS	14	15	12	15	9	169
12	(Canada) Dean Baker **(M)**	4	19			6	22	35	15	7	15			21	5	157
13	(United States) Robert Wright **(M)**	12	26	22	16	9	5	23	19	6	26	11	22	23	23	141
14	(United States) Tim Paul	10	5					6	6			28	10			132
15	(Barbados) Brent Gilkes **(M)**	27	7	16	10	21	11	16	16			18	23	13	27	130
16	(United States) Dan Denison			11	9					17	16	12	18	11	10	126
17	(United States) Keith McCrone **(M)**	15	10	18	8			15	18			19	15	28	11	122
18	(United States) Eric Presbrey **(M)**	18	12			DNS	12	7	32					10	8	116
19	(United States) Zach Craigo	6	23	4	13			22	DNS	23	9					109
20	(Canada) Sergio Pasian	11	22	6	21	20	10	10	23	24	29					107
21	(United States) John McCusker	17	21	19	19	4	19	17	20	16	24	22	25	16	28	98
22	(Canada) Aaron Pettipas	16	11			10	6	33	22	25	20					91
23	(United States) John LaRue **(M)**											**3**	1			90
24	(United States) Chris Livengood									9	8			27	4	83
25	(United States) Shane Morris	8	25	17	7			29	17							72
26	(United States) Steve Jenks **(M)**					19	23	12	11	27	17	13	24			71
26	(United States) Bob Reid **(M)**					14	9			12	25			18	17	71
28	(Brazil) Fabio Orsolon							34	3	26	6					68
28	(United States) Peter Gonzalez **(M)**	23	27	13	14	DNS	DNS			19	19	20	DNS	25	13	68
30	(United States) Joey Selmants										5		4			67
30	(United States) Timm Dunn **(M)**	24	20	23	DNS			14	24			8	26	12	24	67
32	(United States) Matt McDonough			21	3	7	20									66
33	(Mexico) José Armida									10	13	23	14			52
34	(United States) Kem Lall **(M)**	20	15			16	15	25	27			24	19			49
34	(United States) Chris Monteleone **(M)**	25	DNS			15	13	24	30					17	16	49
36	(United States) Russell Lindeman **(M)**	14	18					8	31							47
36	(United States) Paul Farmer **(M)**							19	14	21	18	17	21			47
38	(United States) Bill Jordan **(M)**					13	8									40
39	(United States) Jim Hanrahan **(M)**							13	34	20	23	21	17			39
40	(United States) David Sugg			14	11											32
40	(United States) Charles Finelli **(M)**							18	33			14	16			32
42	(United States) Rob Nicholas **(M)**													7	22	31
42	(United States) Nick Palacio													22	7	31
44	(United States) James Belay			15	12											28
45	(Venezuela) José Montiel									18	21			24	15	26
45	(United States) Davy D'Addario													14	14	26
47	(United States) Vaughn Horvath	19	16									26	20			24
48	(United States) Dwight Rider **(M)**			10	18											22
49	(United States) Tom Drake					DNS	16	20	26							17
49	(United States) Rob Allaer									14	22					17
49	(United States) Alain Matra **(M)**							28	28					19	18	17
52	(United States) Al Guibord, Sr. **(M)**	21	17													14
53	(United States) Craig Clawson **(M)**							38	21							6
54	(United States) Gary Machiko									22	27					5
55	(United States) Scott Baroody					22	DNS	26	25							3
56	(United States) Chris Camadella **(M)**							31	29							2
57	(United States) Chris Gumprecht							27	DNS							1
57	(United States) Brendan Puderbach							30	DNS							1
57	(United States) Chuck Moran **(M)**							37	DNS							1
57	(Canada) Francis Kennette											25	DNS			1
Pos	Driver	VIR		ATL		LRP		WGL		MOH		MOH		SUM		Points

Color	Result
Gold	Winner
Silver	2nd place
Bronze	3rd place
Green	4th & 5th place
Light Blue	6th–10th place
Dark Blue	Finished (Outside Top 10)
Purple	Did not finish
Red	Did not qualify (DNQ)
Brown	Withdrawn (Wth)
Black	Disqualified (DSQ)
White	Did not start (DNS)
Blank	Did not participate (DNP)
Blank	Not competing

**In-line notation**
**Bold**	Pole position (3 points)
Italics	Ran fastest race lap (2 points)

This list only contains drivers who registered for the championship.
(M) indicates driver is participating in Masters Class for drivers over 40 years of age.
