= 2014 F2000 Championship Series =

2014 F2000 Championship season

Seasons
- ← 2013 2015 →

The 2014 F2000 Championship Series season was the ninth season of competition for the series. The season saw the introduction of Spectrum as a constructor.

== Teams and drivers ==
Team	No.	Driver	Car	Engine	Note
Momentum Motorsports	1	(United States) Quinlan Lall	Radon Rn10	Zetec	
Momentum Motorsports	7	(United States) Kern Lall	Van Diemen RF05	Zetec	
Momentum Motorsports	57	(United States) Steven Dweck	Van Diemen	Zetec	
Momentum Motorsports	96	(United States) Jonathon Teixeira	RFR	Zetec	
Dotworks Racing	1	(United States) John McCusker	RFR	Zetec	
BGR Team Grote	4	(Canada) Zacharie Robichon	Van Diemen	Zetec	
Eric Langbein Racing	6	(United States) Skylar Robinson	Citation	Zetec	
Screaming Monkey Racing	06	(United States) Timothy Paul	Van Diemen	Zetec	
3G Racing	7	(Canada) Brent Gilkes	Van Diemen RF03	Zetec	Masters class
Rice Race Prep	7	(Canada) Steve Bamford	Van Diemen RF08	Zetec	Masters class
PT&T Motorsports	12	(United States) Bob Reid	RFR FC	Zetec	Masters class
K-Hill Motorsports	14	(United States) Jason Rabe	Van Diemen RF00	Elite	
K-Hill Motorsports	41	(United States) Connor Kearby	Van Diemen RF06	Zetec	
Bottles of Beer Racing	16	(United States) Peter Gonzalez	Radon Rn10	Zetec	
LaRue Motorsports	17	(United States) John LaRue	Citation FCZ07	Zetec	
SEA Racing	18	(United States) James Belay	Van Diemen RF01	Zetec	Masters class
Front Range Motorsports	19	(United States) Doug Stout	Van Diemen RF05	Zetec	Masters class
Britain West Motorsports	23	(Canada) Sergio Pasian	Van Diemen	Zetec	
Britain West Motorsports	64	(Canada) Jim Hallman	Van Diemen	Zetec	Masters class
Team Shaffer Motorsports	25	(United States) Nick Palacio	Van Diemen RF01	Zetec	
Polestar Racing Group	29	(United States) David Grant	Spectrum 014Z	Zetec	
Polestar Racing Group	44	(United States) Sam Beasley	Van Diemen	Zetec	
Polestar Racing Group	51	(United States) Dan Denison	Van Diemen	Zetec	Masters class
Fatboy Racing	31	(United States) Brendan Puderbach	RFR	Zetec	
Fatboy Racing	83	(United States) Charles Finelli	Van Diemen RF01	Zetec	Masters class
GTP Motorsports	35	(United States) Eric Presbrey	Van Diemen	Zetec	Masters class
GTP Motorsports	70	(United States) Tom Fatur	Van Diemen	Zetec	Masters class
Magnum Motorsports	37	(United States) Davy D'Addario	RFR FC	Zetec	
Baker Racing	52	(Canada) Dean Baker	Van Diemen RF05	Zetec	Masters class
Alley Cat Racing	61	(United States) Tom Drake	Van Diemen RF99	Zetec	
Kopp Motorsports	66	(United States) Kevin Kopp	Van Diemen	Zetec	
Weitzenhof Racing	67	(United States) Dave Weitzenhof	Citation 95SFZ	Zetec	Masters class
Houndspeed Racing	68	(United States) Steve Jenks	Van Diemen RF00	Zetec	Masters class
Raceworks	76	(United States) Beau Borders	Van Diemen RF01	Zetec	
Exclusive Autosport	93	(Canada) Thomas McGregor	Spectrum 014Z	Zetec	
ADSAWright Racing	90	(United States) Robert Wright	Radon Rn10	Zetec	Masters class
ADSAWright Racing	95	(United States) Alan Guibord	Radon Rn10	Zetec	
Company Motorsports	97	(United States) Christopher Gumprecht	RFR FC	Zetec	
PRL Motorsports	98	(United States) James Libecco	Van Diemen RF05	Zetec	
John Walko Racing	27	(United States) Gary Machiko	Van Diemen	Zetec	
Ski Motorsports	88	(United States) Tim Minor	Citation	Zetec	Masters class
Work Racing	91	(United States) Trent Walko	RFR FC	Zetec	
Work Racing	73	(United States) Chris Livengood	RFR FC	Zetec	
CJ Motorsports	71	(United States) Connor Gawry	Van Diemen	Zetec	
LTD Motorsports	2	(United States) Robert Allaer	Van Diemen	Zetec	
Selmants Racing	28	(United States) Joey Selmants	Van Diemen	Zetec	
Air Adventures Ltd.	8	(United States) Hilton Tallman	Mygale	Zetec	Masters class
ARM Racing	26	(United States) Alain Matrat	Van Diemen	Zetec	
Baroodey Motorsports	51	(United States) John Baroody	Van Diemen	Pinto	
MMC Racing	80	(United States) Don Betterly	Van Diemen	Pinto	

== Race calendar and results ==
Round	Circuit	Location	Date	Pole position	Fastest lap	Winning driver
1	Road Atlanta	(United States) Braselton, Georgia	April 12	(United States) Tim Minor	(United States) Skylar Robinson	(United States) Skylar Robinson
2	Road Atlanta	(United States) Braselton, Georgia	April 13	(United States) Tim Minor	(United States) Tim Minor	(United States) Tim Minor
3	Watkins Glen International	(United States) Watkins Glen, New York	May 17	(United States) Tim Minor	(United States) Tim Minor	(United States) Tim Minor
4	Watkins Glen International	(United States) Watkins Glen, New York	May 18	(United States) Tim Minor	(Canada) Sergio Pasian	(United States) Tim Minor
5	Virginia International Raceway	(United States) Alton, Virginia	June 7	(United States) Tim Minor	(United States) Skylar Robinson	(United States) Thomas McGregor
6	Virginia International Raceway	(United States) Alton, Virginia	June 8	(United States) Skylar Robinson	(United States) Thomas McGregor	(United States) Tim Minor
7	Mid-Ohio Sports Car Course	(United States) Lexington, Ohio	July 5	(United States) John LaRue	(United States) John LaRue	(United States) John LaRue
8	Mid-Ohio Sports Car Course	(United States) Lexington, Ohio	July 6	(United States) Thomas McGregor	(United States) Thomas McGregor	(United States) Tim Minor
9	Pittsburgh International Race Complex	(United States) Wampum, Pennsylvania	August 2	(United States) Sam Beasley	(United States) Skylar Robinson	(United States) Sam Beasley
10	Pittsburgh International Race Complex	(United States) Wampum, Pennsylvania	August 3	(United States) Skylar Robinson	(United States) Sam Beasley	(United States) Sam Beasley
11	Thompson Speedway Road Course	(United States) Thompson, Connecticut	August 30	(United States) Skylar Robinson	(United States) Skylar Robinson	(United States) Skylar Robinson
12	Thompson Speedway Road Course	(United States) Thompson, Connecticut	August 31	(United States) Skylar Robinson	(United States) Skylar Robinson	(United States) Skylar Robinson
13	Watkins Glen International	(United States) Watkins Glen, New York	October 11	(United States) Tim Minor	(United States) Sam Beasley	(United States) Sam Beasley
14	Watkins Glen International	(United States) Watkins Glen, New York	October 12	(United States) Skylar Robinson	(United States) Skylar Robinson	(United States) Skylar Robinson

== Final standings ==
Pos.	Driver	(United States) ATL		(United States) WGI1		(United States) VIR		(United States) MOH		(United States) PIT		(United States) TOM		(United States) WGI2		Points
1	(United States) Tim Minor (M)	3	1	1	1	7	1	3	1	6	3	4	3	8	2	520
2	(United States) Skylar Robinson	1	2	2	DNF	2	DNF	5	4	2	2	1	1	11	1	518
3	(United States) Sam Beasley	8	DNS	4	14	3	3	2	11	1	1	2	2	1	3	472
4	(Canada) Thomas McGregor	6	3	3	DNF	1	2	4	2	4	5	3	4	7	6	436
5	(United States) David Grand	4	25	5	6	6	5	11	7	5	4	6	6	2	4	380
6	(United States) Kevin Kopp	2	24	30	2	5	4	8	22	7	6	8	DNS	6	20	296
7	(United States) John McCusker	10	5	8	7	8	DNF	14	8	10	8	5	14	5	21	288
8	(Canada) Steve Bamford (M)	11	4	9	5	10	DNF	20	16	9	10	7	8	9	DNF	263
9	(United States) James Libecco	7	22	7	DNF	9	8	15	5	DNF	7	10	10	16	DNF	228
9	(Canada) Sergio Pasian	5	8	DNF	3	15	DNF	7	6					4	5	228
11	(United States) Timothy Paul	9	6	6	27			9	9			DNF	16	3	DNF	177
12	(United States) Trent Walko							10	13	3	DNF	9	5	14	8	166
13	(United States) Jason Rabe	19	9	15	11	DNF	7	13	10					12	9	164
14	(United States) Quinian Lall	DNF	16	DNF	DNF	17	13	12	15	8	16	DNF	7	25	10	148
15	(United States) Dan Denison (M)	13	11					16	DNS	11	9	DNF	9	13	14	138
16	(United States) Charles Finelli (M)	DNF	10	18	15	11	18	17	18					20	13	106
17	(United States) Chris Livengood			12	8	4	6									105
18	(United States) Dave Weitzenhof (M)	15	17							12	12	13	12	19	15	104
19	(United States) John Larue							1	3							97
20	(United States) Eric Presbrey (M)	12	7	17	12	21	12									92
21	(Canada) Dean Baker (M)	14	15	11	4	19	DNF									85
22	(United States) Tom Fatur (M)			10	10	12	9							26	DNS	83
23	(United States) Bob Reid (M)	23	21	23	20			23	21	13	13	DNF		24	19	82
24	(United States) Davy D'Addario	21	19	13	16							DNS	11	23	DNF	59
24	(United States) Robert Wright (M)	26	DNF	20	17	DNF	17	18	DNF	DNF	DNF	DNS		22	12	59
26	(United States) Joey Selmants			14	DNF			6	14							56
27	(United States) Alan Guibord	18		31	9							DNF	13			48
27	(United States) Jonathan Teixeira									14	14	14	17			48
29	(United States) Beau Borders	20	13	21	19	DNF	14									47
29	(United States) Doug Stout (M)	24	14	29	13	13	DNF									47
29	(United States) Chris Monteleone											15			17	47
32	(United States) Brendan Puderbach			25	18	16	15	21	DNF	DNF	17					46
33	(Canada) Brent Gilkes (M)	DNF	12			20	11									43
34	(United States) Austin McCusker													10	11	40
35	(United States) Steve Jenks (M)	22	DNF					DNF	23	16	11					38
35	(Canada) Zacharie Robichon													15	7	38
37	(United States) Nick Palacio					14	10									34
38	(United States) Gary Machiko							22	19	15	15					33
39	(United States) Craig Clawson							19	17					21	16	31
40	(United States) Chris Gumprecht	16	18	16	26							DNS				29
41	(United States) Alain Matrat			27	25		16									20
42	(United States) Robert Allaer							24	12							19
43	(Canada) Jim Hallman (M)													17	18	17
44	(United States) Paul Farmer (M)	17	23													12
44	(United States) Tom Drake			19	21											12
46	(United States) Peter Gonzalez			22	22											8
47	(United States) Kern Lall	DNS	20											DNS	DNF	7
48	(United States) Connor Gawry							DNS	20							6
49	(United States) Hilton Tallman (M)			24	24											4
49	(United States) Steven Dweck			26	23											4
51	(United States) Donald Betterly			DNF	DNF											2
52	(United States) James Belay (M)	25	DNS													1
52	(United States) Connor Kearby	DNF	DNS													1
52	(United States) Scott Baroody			28												1
