= 2016 F2000 Championship Series =

2016 F2000 Championship season

Seasons
- ← 2015 2017 →

The 2016 F2000 Championship Series season is the eleventh season of competition for the series.

Canadian Masters Class competitor Steve Bamford won eight of the twelve races he contested and won the championship. He is the second masters class driver to win the championship.

American John McCusker won the penultimate round of the championship to finish second in points. American Masters Class competitor won one race and finished third in points. Other winners were veteran Bob Reid who won the final race of the season, a rain-affected race of only seven laps, and Americans John LaRue and Trent Walko, who each only competed in four races, finishing on the podium in all four, and winning one. Matt McDonough won the first race at Watkins Glen International, the only round he competed in.

The points system allows a driver's two worst races to be "dropped" for season points. Because of this, Dave Weitzenhof was the only driver to compete in all sixteen races of the schedule.

== Race calendar and results ==
Round	Circuit	Location	Date	Pole position	Fastest lap	Winning driver
NC	Palm Beach International Raceway	(United States) Jupiter, Florida	February 14	(United States) Blake Mount	(United States) Blake Mount	(United States) Blake Mount
NC	Sebring International Raceway	(United States) Sebring, Florida	February 21	(United States) Skylar Robinson	(United States) Skylar Robinson	(United States) Davy D'addario
1	Road Atlanta	(United States) Braselton, Georgia	April 9	(United States) Brandon Dixon	(Canada) Steve Bamford	(Canada) Steve Bamford
2	Road Atlanta	(United States) Braselton, Georgia	April 10	(United States) Brandon Dixon	(Canada) Steve Bamford	(Canada) Steve Bamford
3	Watkins Glen International	(United States) Watkins Glen, New York	May 14	(United States) Dave Weitzenhof	(Canada) Steve Bamford	(United States) Matt McDonough
4	Watkins Glen International	(United States) Watkins Glen, New York	May 15	(Canada) Steve Bamford	(United States) John McCusker	(Canada) Steve Bamford
5	Virginia International Raceway	(United States) Alton, Virginia	June 4	(Canada) Steve Bamford	(United States) John LaRue	(Canada) Steve Bamford
6	Virginia International Raceway	(United States) Alton, Virginia	June 5	(United States) John LaRue	(Canada) Steve Bamford	(Canada) Steve Bamford
7	Mid-Ohio Sports Car Course	(United States) Lexington, Ohio	July 2	(Canada) Steve Bamford	(Canada) Steve Bamford	(Canada) Steve Bamford
8	Mid-Ohio Sports Car Course	(United States) Lexington, Ohio	July 3	(Canada) Steve Bamford	(United States) John LaRue	(United States) John LaRue
9	Pittsburgh International Race Complex	(United States) Wampum, Pennsylvania	August 6	(Canada) Steve Bamford	(United States) Trent Walko	(Canada) Steve Bamford
10	Pittsburgh International Race Complex	(United States) Wampum, Pennsylvania	August 7	(Canada) Steve Bamford	(Canada) Steve Bamford	(Canada) Steve Bamford
11	New Jersey Motorsports Park	(United States) Millville, New Jersey	August 27	(United States) Brandon Dixon	(United States) Brandon Dixon	(United States) Brandon Dixon
12	New Jersey Motorsports Park	(United States) Millville, New Jersey	August 28	(United States) Trent Walko	(United States) Trent Walko	(United States) Trent Walko
13	Virginia International Raceway	(United States) Alton, Virginia	October 1	(United States) Kaylen Frederick	(United States) Kaylen Frederick	(United States) John McCusker
14	Virginia International Raceway	(United States) Alton, Virginia	October 2	(United States) John McCusker	(United States) Jenna Grillo	(United States) Bob Reid

== Championship standings ==
Pos.	Driver	(United States) ATL		(United States) WGI		(United States) VIR1		(United States) MOH		(United States) PIT		(United States) NJMP		(United States) VIR2		Points
1	(Canada) Steve Bamford **(M)**	1	1	5	**1**	**1**	1	**1**	**3**	**1**	**1**	4	4			570
2	(United States) John McCusker	3	3	6	3			6	4	7	4	3	3	1	2	435
3	(United States) Brandon Dixon **(M)**	**2**	**4**	DNS		3	3	3	2	2	5	**1**	2			400
4	(United States) Dave Weitzenhof **(M)**	5	13	**7**	4	7	5	7	7	5	13	8	9	4	9	335
5	(United States) Bob Reid **(M)**	15	10	8	10	4	4	11	11	8	14			3	1	297
6	(United States) Steve Jenks **(M)**	14	5	12				5	8	4	3	7	5			246
7	(United States) Robert Wright **(M)**	10	DNS	3	9	DNS		10	10	DNS	DNS	9	11	10		186
8	(United States) John LaRue **(M)**					2	**2**	2	1							183
9	(United States) Peter Gonzalez **(M)**	12	15	15	DNS			16	20	11	10	12	10	8	4	179
10	(United States) Trent Walko									3	2	2	**1**			176
11	(United States) Jenna Grillo	12	6	9	15			15	12					6	6	158
12	(United States) Dan Denison **(M)**	6	9							6	6	11	12			146
13	(United States) David Grant	4	2	10	2											139
14	(United States) Davy D'addario			4	5					13	7	DNS	7			134
15	(United States) Tim Paul			11	7			9	18			5	8			133
16	(United States) Nick Palacio											6	6	2	5	125
17	(Canada) Jayson Clunie	8	8	2	8											117
18	(United States) Devin Lesueur					5	6	18	15	14	12					109
19	(United States) Tom Fatur **(M)**					DNS				10	8			9	3	106
20	(United States) Connor Gawry					6	7	12	9	15	9					104
21	(United States) Chris Gumprecht			DNS	14			13	13	12	11			5	10	99
22	(United States) Matt McDonough **(M)**			1	6											79
23	(United States) Robert Allaer **(M)**							4	6							63
24	(United States) Brendan Puderbach	9	7					19	19							58
25	(United States) Austin McCusker							8	5						8	57
26	(United States) Charles Finelli **(M)**	7	11													46
27	(United States) Paul Farmer											13		11	7	43
28	(United States) Mauro Fauza **(M)**			13	11											34
29	(United States) Alex Ethier			17	13			17	17							34
30	(United States) Kaylen Frederick													**7**	11	33
31	(United States) Scott Gesford **(M)**			16	12			20	16							29
32	(United States) Chris Horan							14	14							26
33	(United States) Reilly Harris									9	15					24
34	(United States) Donald Betterly											10	13			22
35	(Barbados) Brent Gilkes **(M)**	13	12													16
36	(United States) Al Guibord **(M)**			14												13
37	(United States) Sam Beasley	16	14													2
Pos.	Driver	(United States) ATL		(United States) WGI		(United States) VIR1		(United States) MOH		(United States) PIT		(United States) NJMP		(United States) VIR2		Points

Color	Result
Gold	Winner
Silver	2nd place
Bronze	3rd place
Green	4th & 5th place
Light Blue	6th–10th place
Dark Blue	Finished (Outside Top 10)
Purple	Did not finish
Red	Did not qualify (DNQ)
Brown	Withdrawn (Wth)
Black	Disqualified (DSQ)
White	Did not start (DNS)
Blank	Did not participate (DNP)
Blank	Not competing

**In-line notation**
**Bold**	Pole position (3 points)
Italics	Ran fastest race lap (2 points)
