= Santino Ferrucci =

American racing driver (born 1998)

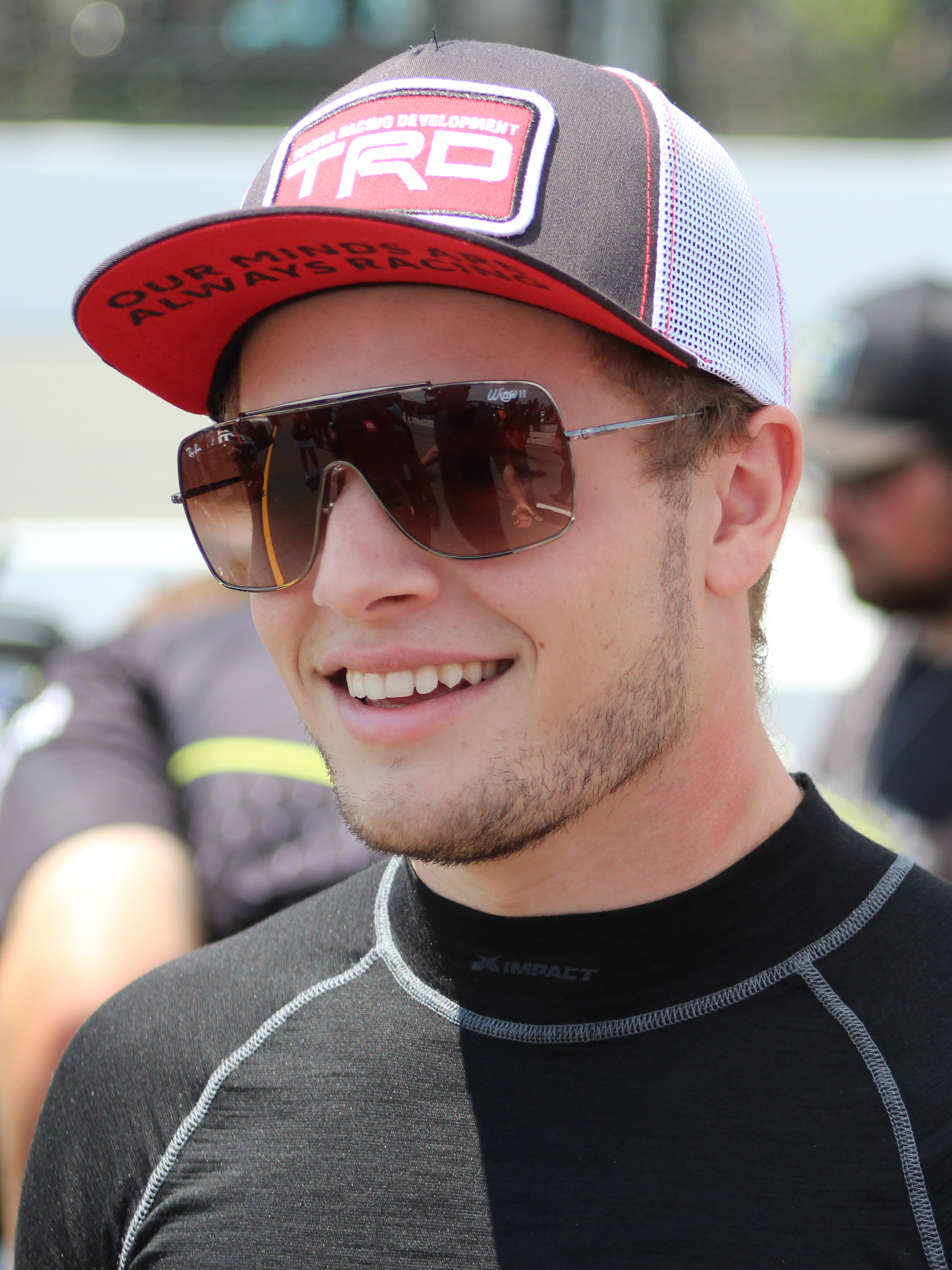
- Ferrucci at Pocono Raceway in 2021
- Nationality: (United States) American
- Born: Santino Michael Ferrucci; May 31, 1998 (age 28); Woodbury, Connecticut, U.S.

IndyCar Series career
- 109 races run over 8 years
- Team: No. 14 (A. J. Foyt Enterprises)
- Best finish: 9th (2024)
- First race: 2018 Detroit Grand Prix, Race 1 (Belle Isle)
- Last race: 2026 Mission Grand Prix of Monterey (Laguna Seca)
Wins	Podiums	Poles
0	3	1

NASCAR O'Reilly Auto Parts Series career
- 9 races run over 2 years
- 2022 position: 60th
- Best finish: 37th (2021)
- First race: 2021 Contender Boats 250 (Homestead)
- Last race: 2022 Pennzoil 150 (Indianapolis G.P.)
Wins	Top tens	Poles
0	0	0

Previous series
- 2017–18 2016–17 2015 2014–15 2014 2014 2013: FIA Formula 2 Championship; GP3 Series; Toyota Racing Series; European Formula 3 British Formula Three; German Formula 3 F2000 Championship Series

Santino Michael Ferrucci (born May 31, 1998) is an American professional racing driver. He most recently competed in the IndyCar Series, driving the No. 14 Chevrolet for A. J. Foyt Enterprises. He has also previously raced in the FIA Formula 2 Championship and the NASCAR Xfinity Series.

== Career ==
=== Lower formulae ===
Ferrucci competed in five races in German Formula Three for EuroInternational, scoring second in his fourth. He also completed three races in British Formula 3 for Fortec Motorsport, scoring a pole and two wins as well as the end of European Formula 3 season, again for EuroInternational.

Reuniting with Fortec, Ferrucci participated in the Macau Grand Prix. Ferrucci finished the main race in eighth.

=== FIA Formula 3 European Championship ===
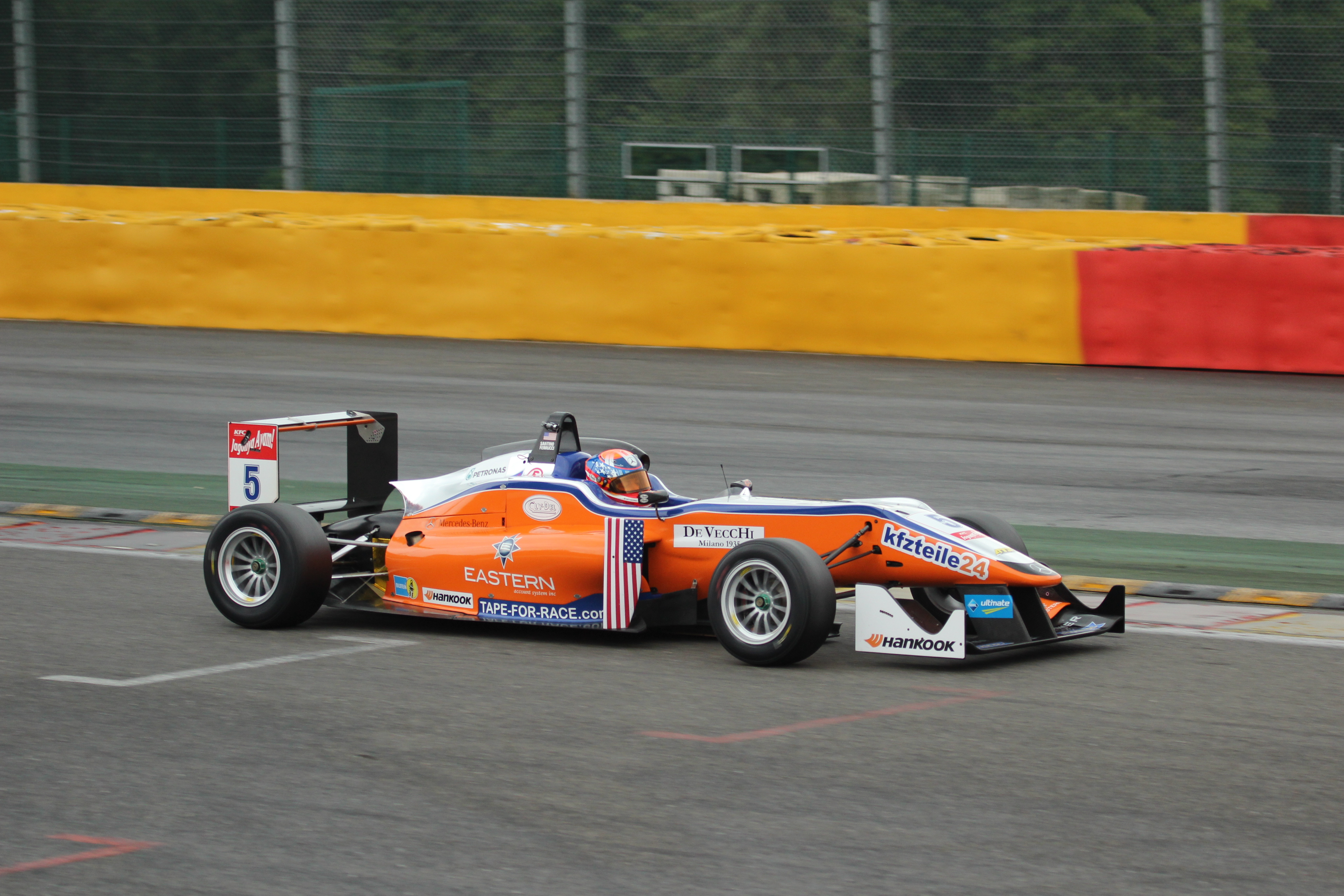
Ferrucci competing at Spa-Francorchamps during the 2015 FIA Formula 3 European Championship.

At the start of 2015, Ferrucci competed in the Toyota Racing Series for Giles Motorsport. Ferrucci finished the season third overall, scoring his only win at Manfeild and scoring five other podiums.

Ferrucci returned to European Formula 3, this time with Mücke Motorsport, finishing eleventh overall and scoring his only podium in Formula 3 at Spa. At the end of the year, Ferrucci once again raced in the Macau Grand Prix, this time finishing sixth in the main race.

=== GP3 Series ===
Ferrucci moved to the GP3 Series with newcomers DAMS. Ferrucci's best result was a third in the sprint race at Spa-Francorchamps and ended the season twelfth in the standings.

In February 2017, Ferrucci retained a DAMS drive for a second GP3 season. He only competed in the first three events, and scored points in only the first two races, before making a switch to Formula 2.

=== FIA Formula 2 Championship ===
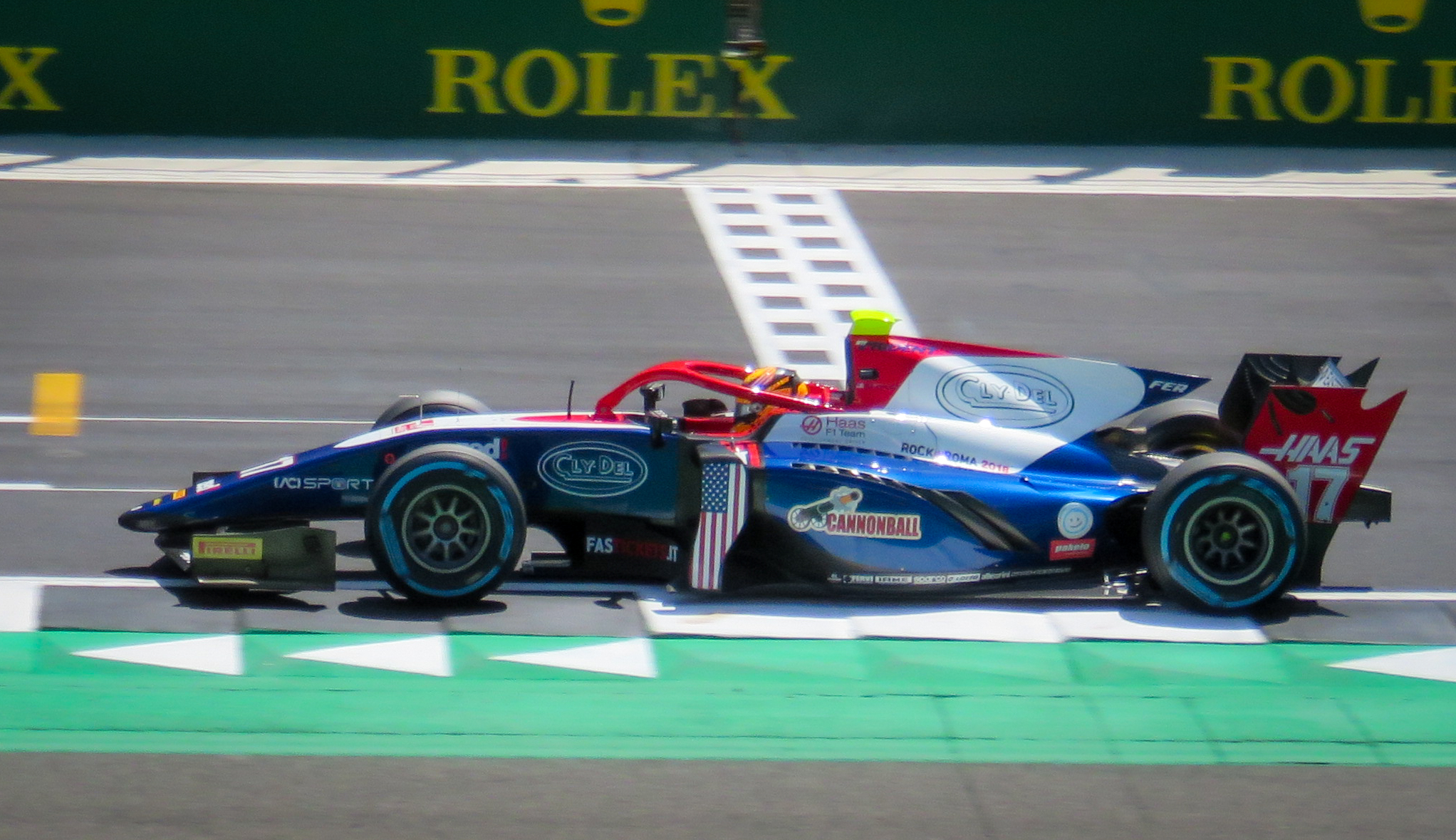
Ferrucci practicing at Silverstone in Formula 2 before he was banned for four races and fired by Trident.

Ferrucci made his Formula 2 debut in Hungary in 2017 and finished the remainder of the year with Trident, with ninth his best result for a race and 22nd in the season standings. For the 2018 season, Ferrucci remained in Formula 2, competing alongside Arjun Maini at Trident.

In July, Ferrucci was banned from four F2 races (Hungary and Belgium rounds) and fined €60,000 after making deliberate contact with his teammate Maini on the cooldown lap after the sprint race at Silverstone. He was also disqualified from the sprint race results after not attending the hearing for a separate incident where he deliberately forced Maini off the track during the race. He was also found to have driven his car from the F2 paddock to the pitlane wearing one glove and holding a phone, which resulted in an additional €6,000 fine. His attempt to run a "Make America Great Again" livery in support of Donald Trump was blocked by the FIA as being in violation of the political slogans policy.

On July 18, Ferrucci was fired by the Trident F2 team, alleging behavioral issues and lack of payments. Trident noted that Ferrucci was able to fund his Detroit IndyCar drive, whilst defaulting on debt to them. An Italian court subsequently ordered Ferrucci to pay Trident €502,000, plus interest and legal fees, for breach of contract and failing to provide payments. Six days later, Trident announced that their GP3 Series driver Alessio Lorandi would be Ferrucci's replacement for the rest of the season.

Ferrucci finished nineteenth in the standings, with seven points and a best result of sixth in the Baku Sprint race.

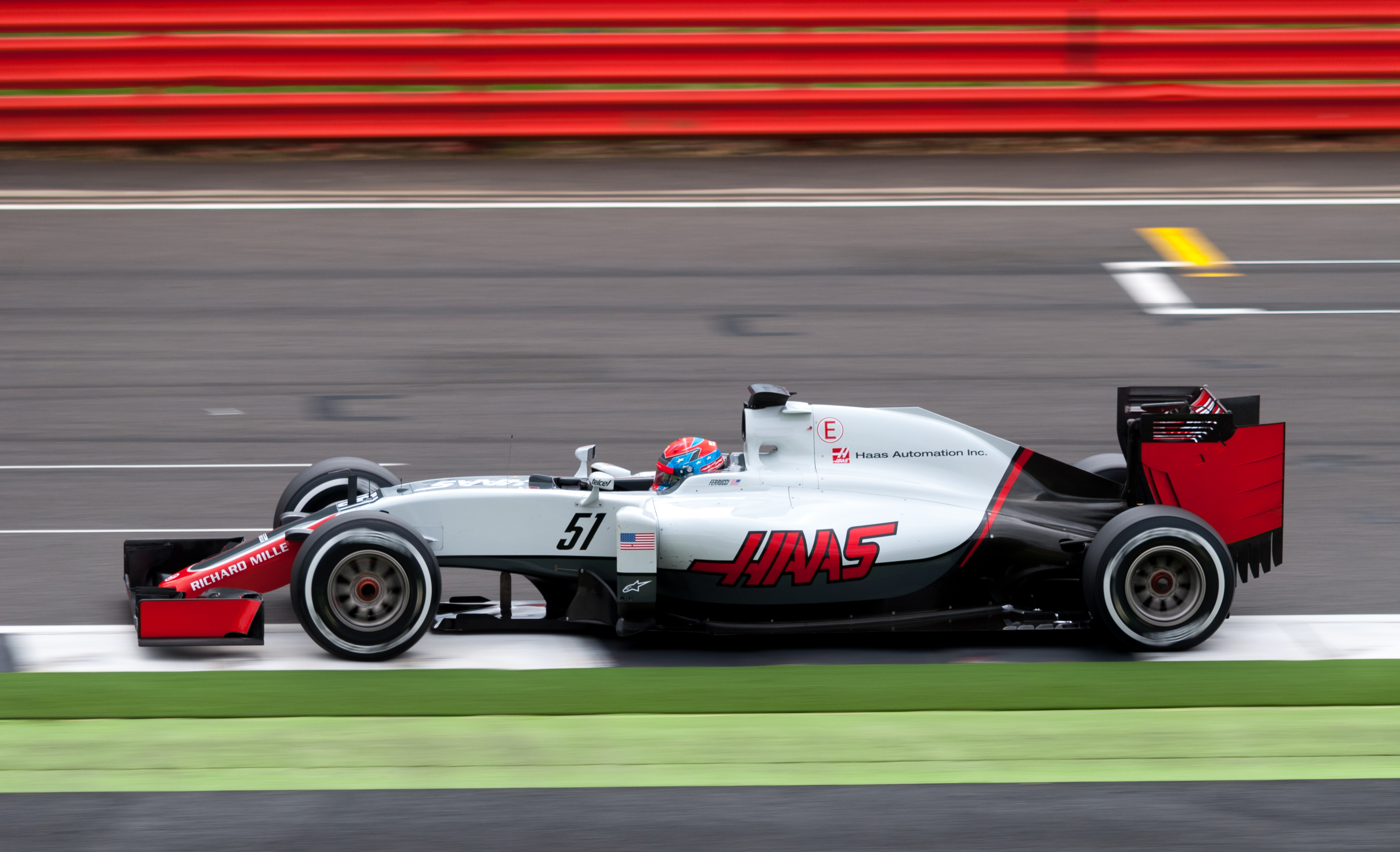
Ferrucci testing for Haas in 2016.

=== Formula One ===
After confirmation of Ferrucci's entry into the 2016 GP3 Series, he became a test and reserve driver for the Haas F1 Team alongside Ferrari Driver Academy member and GP3 champion, Charles Leclerc. Ferrucci got his first taste of F1 machinery when he tested for Haas at Silverstone after the British Grand Prix. Haas retained Ferrucci as development driver for 2017 and 2018.

=== IndyCar Series ===
==== 2018 ====
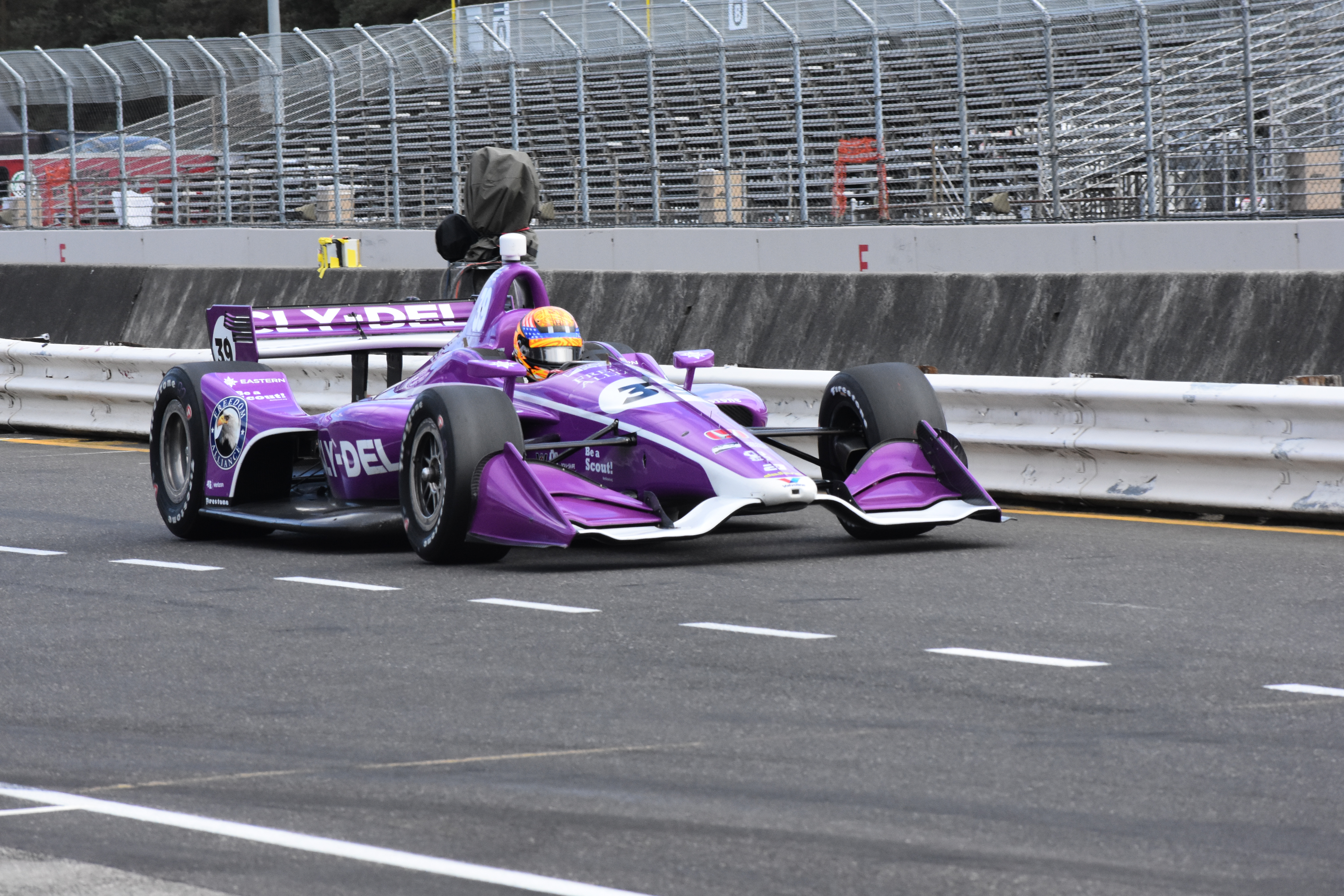
Ferrucci, driving for Dale Coyne Racing during testing at Portland in 2018.

In June 2018, Ferrucci made his debut in the IndyCar Series at the Detroit Grand Prix for Dale Coyne Racing as a substitute for Pietro Fittipaldi. Ferrucci retired from his first race after being shunted out of the race by Charlie Kimball on lap 56.

After his departure from Formula 2, Ferrucci contested the final two rounds of the IndyCar Series season with Dale Coyne Racing.

==== 2019 ====
Ferrucci signed with Coyne to contest the full 2019 IndyCar Series season driving the No. 19 Cly-Del Honda. In his season debut at the Grand Prix of St. Petersburg, Ferrucci recorded a top-ten finish, bringing his car home in ninth position. At the Indianapolis Grand Prix, he posted his second top-ten finish of the IndyCar season heading into preparations for his first Indianapolis 500 effort. After qualifying 23rd for the Indy 500, Ferrucci moved through the 33-car field to finish in seventh position, earning him Rookie of the Year honors in his first-ever race at the Indianapolis 500. Three races later, Ferrucci recorded his best career IndyCar finish by taking the checkered flag in fourth position at Texas Motor Speedway.

==== 2020 ====
After teammate Sébastien Bourdais's departure from Dale Coyne Racing, Ferrucci moved to Bourdais's No. 18 SealMaster Honda for the 2020 season. He finished fourth at the Indianapolis 500, and scored five top-fives out of fourteen races, to finish thirteenth in points.

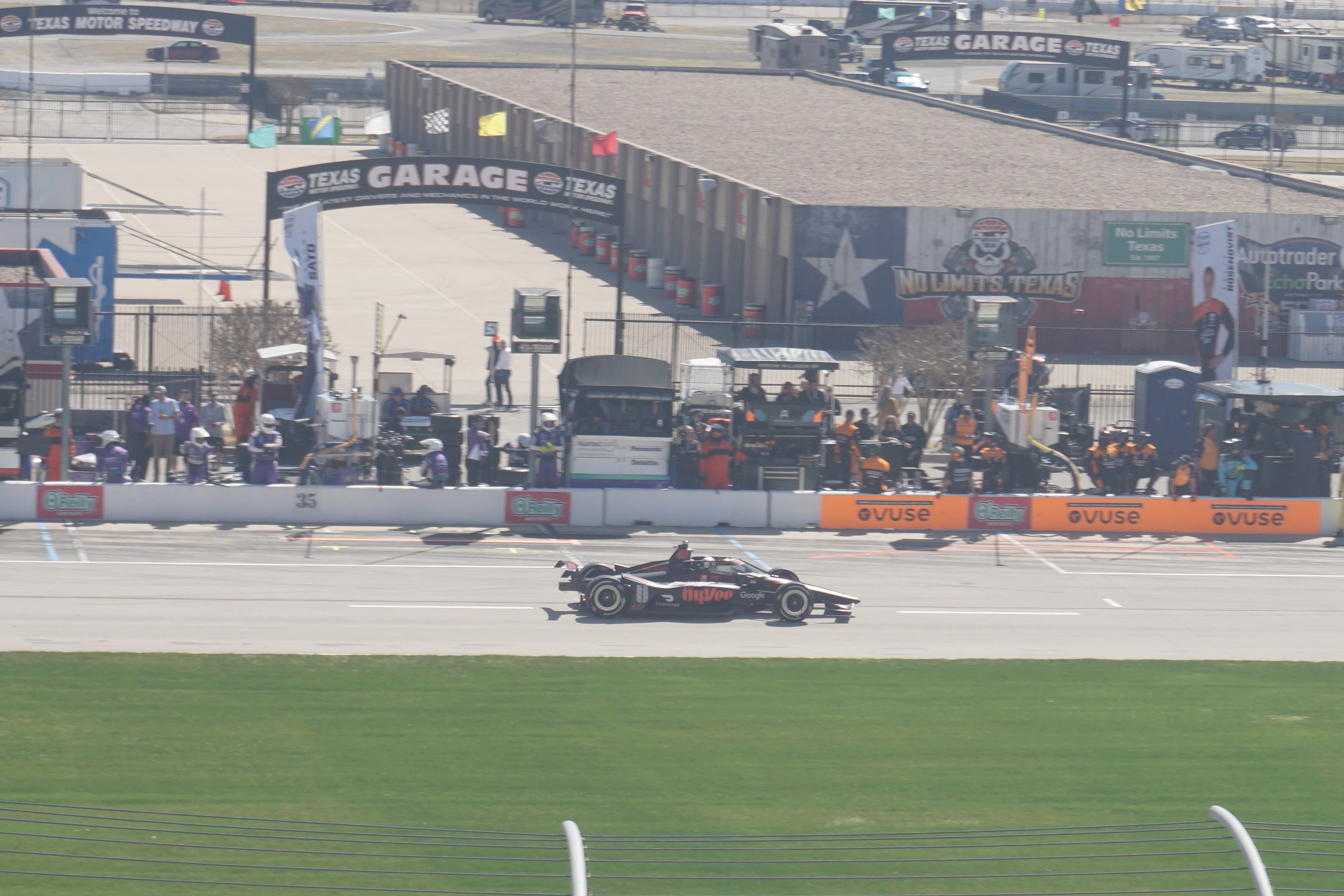
Ferrucci during the 2022 XPEL 375

==== 2021 ====
Ferrucci signed with Rahal Letterman Lanigan Racing to run a third car sponsored by Hyvee at the 2021 Indianapolis 500. Ferucci drove the car to sixth place, the highest of any of the RLL drivers in the race. Ferrucci's results at the Indy 500 earned him four additional drives with RLL at Detroit, Mid-Ohio, and Nashville. Ferrucci recorded top-ten finishes at both races in Detroit as well as Mid Ohio but also crashed the No. 45 car in such a manner that the team could not fix it in time for the second Detroit race, forcing him to run with a car that used what was still drivable off of No. 45 car and Takuma Sato's backup/superspeedway car. Ferrucci expressed to Bobby Rahal that he would be open to a full-time return to IndyCar if Rahal were to give him a drive in the third RLL car. RLL ultimately chose Alpine Academy driver Christian Lundgaard to drive their third car full time, ending Ferrucci's tenure with the team.

==== 2022 ====
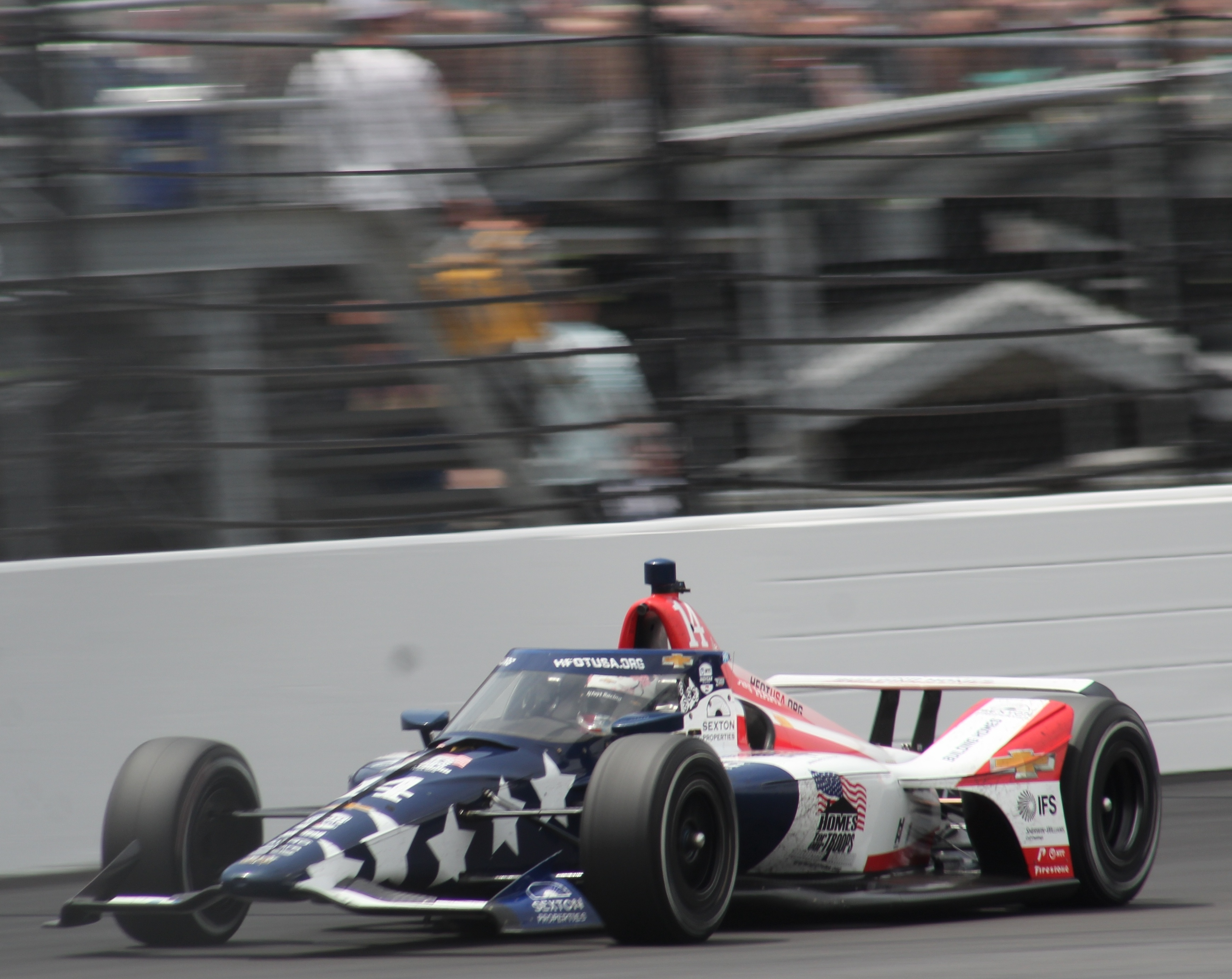
Ferrucci during the 2023 Indianapolis 500

Ferrucci signed with Dreyer & Reinbold Racing to compete in the 2022 Indianapolis 500 alongside Sage Karam. However, he would also fill in for Jack Harvey at Rahal Letterman Lanigan Racing for the XPEL 375, as Harvey withdrew after qualifying due to a crash declaring him not fit to race.

After Callum Ilott crashed during the 2022 Indianapolis 500 and was deemed not fit by IndyCar, Ferrucci was appointed as his replacement at the Detroit Grand Prix.

==== 2023 ====
Ferrucci returned to IndyCar in 2023 full-time with A. J. Foyt Racing, partnering Indy Lights graduate Benjamin Pedersen. It was his first full IndyCar campaign since 2020.

Ferrucci qualified fourth for the 2023 Indy 500 in the A. J. Foyt Racing No. 14 Chevrolet with a speed of 233.661 mph.

Ferrucci finished third in the 2023 Indy 500 in the A. J. Foyt Racing No. 14, the best finish of an A. J. Foyt Racing entry since 2000.

==== 2024 ====
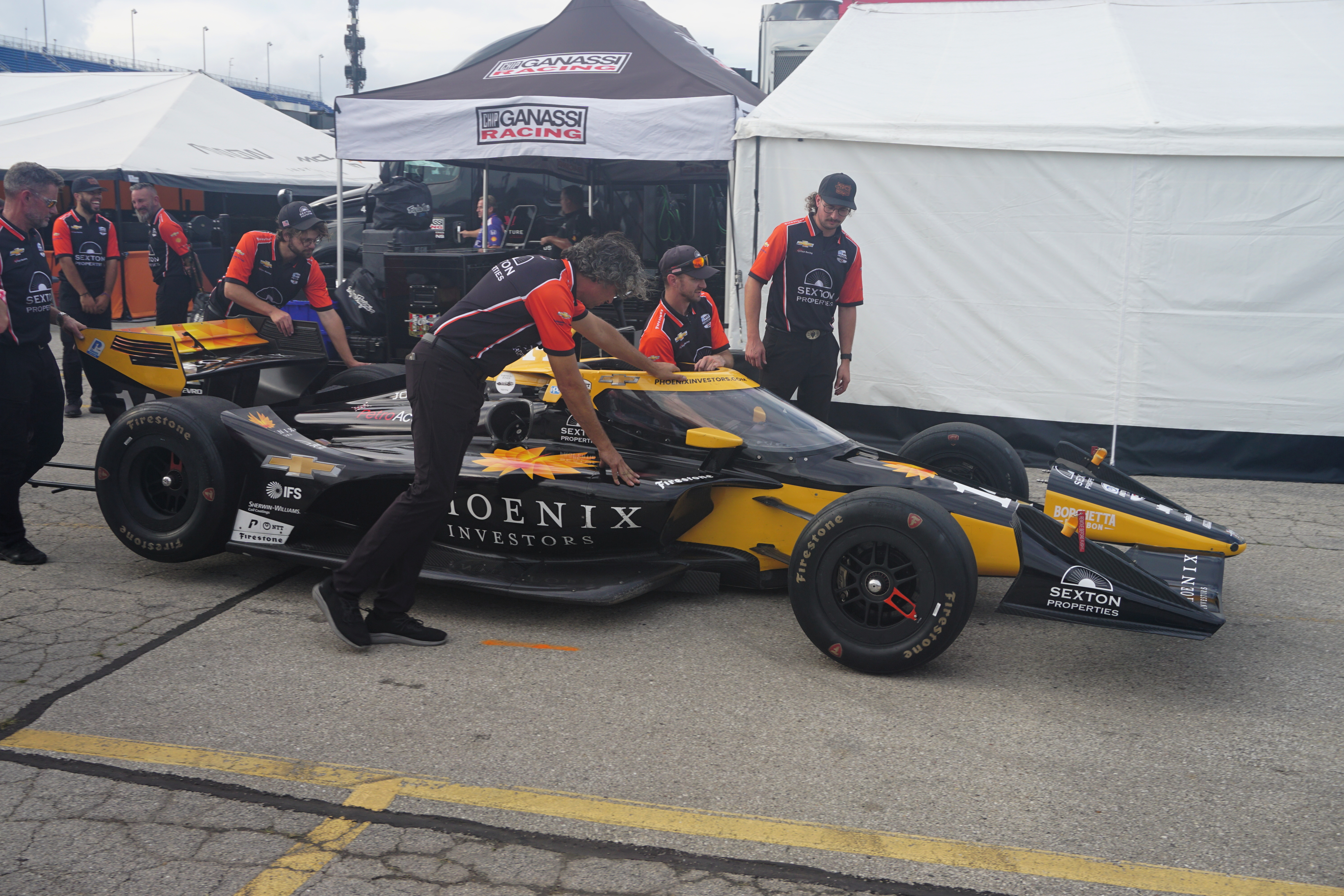
Ferrucci's car before the 2024 Hy-Vee Milwaukee Mile 250s

Ferrucci continued with A. J. Foyt Racing in 2024, now alongside Sting Ray Robb.

Ferrucci qualified sixth for the 2024 Indianapolis 500 and finished 8th.

In June, Ferrucci apologized for making insensitive comments after Saturday practice incidents involving Andretti Global drivers Colton Herta and Kyle Kirkwood at the 2024 Detroit Grand Prix. At Portland, Ferrucci took his first pole position and would go on to finish eighth in the race. At the 2024 Hy-Vee Milwaukee Mile 250s, he finished fourth in both the first and second races.

Ferrucci was the revelation of the season, using the team's technical partnership with Penske to score 11 top-10 finishes in 17 starts, propelling him to his best championship finish of 9th.

==== 2025 ====
Ferrucci had a slow start to the 2025 season, but finished fifth at the Indianapolis 500, kicking off a streak of four straight top-fives, including his second and third career podiums at Detroit and Road America, respectively.

=== Midget car racing ===
In January 2021, Ferrucci made his midget car racing debut in the Chili Bowl for Dave Mac Motorsports. He failed to finish his G Feature race and was classified in tenth.

=== NASCAR ===
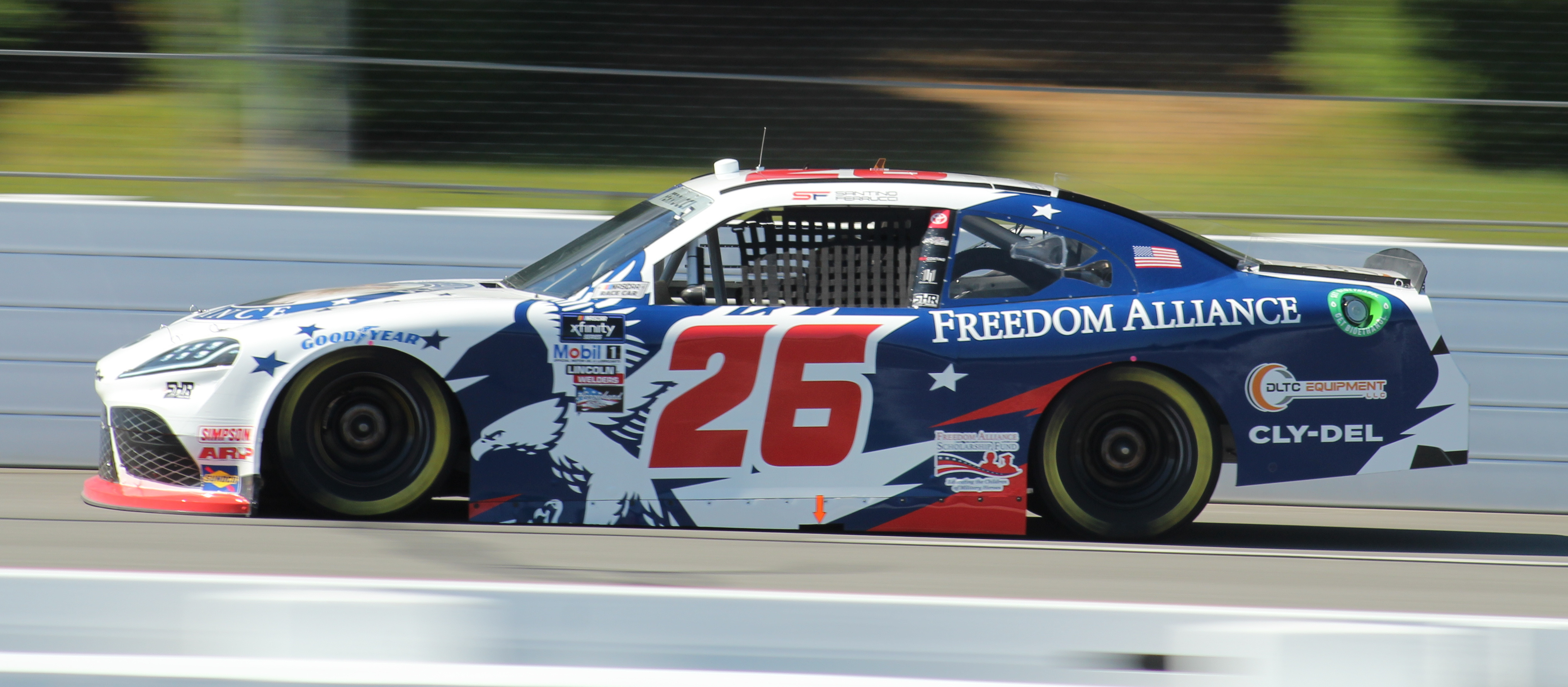
Ferrucci's No. 26 car at Pocono Raceway in 2022

On January 8, 2021, it was confirmed that Ferrucci would run a 20-race schedule piloting the No. 26 Toyota Supra for Sam Hunt Racing for the upcoming NASCAR Xfinity Series season. Ferrucci had limited stock car racing experience prior to NASCAR, with his lone foray being a super late model test with Fury Race Cars in 2020. Ferrucci would return to the team's No. 26 car for the Xfinity Series races at Pocono and the Indianapolis Road Course in 2022.

== Personal life ==
Ferrucci was born in Woodbury, Connecticut, to Mike and Valerie Ferrucci. Growing up, his racing idol was Michael Schumacher.

== Karting record ==
=== Karting career summary ===
Season	Series	Team	Position
2005	SKUSA SuperNationals — Comer		9th
2006	WKA Manufacturer's Cup — Yamaha Junior Sportsman		25th
2006	WKA Manufacturer's Cup — Cadet Sportsman		21st
2006	Stars of Karting National — Cadet		33rd
2007	Florida Winter Tour — Comer Cadet		10th
2007	Stars of Karting West — Cadet	Team OVRP	14th
2007	Stars of Karting East — Cadet	Team OVRP	10th
2008	Canadian National Karting Championships — Rotax Mini MAX		12th
2008	Canadian National Karting Championships — Rotax Micro MAX		2nd
2008	Rotax Max Challenge USA Grand Nationals — Minimax		3rd
2008	Stars of Karting National — Cadet		12th
2008	Stars of Karting West — Cadet		6th
2008	Stars of Karting East — Cadet		3rd
2008	Florida Winter Tour — Comer Cadet	San Yves Motorsports	1st
2009	WKA Manufacturer's Cup — Yamaha Sportsman Lite		7th
2009	WKA Manufacturer's Cup — Yamaha Sportsman Heavy		11th
2009	WSK North American Series — Cadet	Maranello North America	8th
2009	WKA Manufacturer's Cup — Cadet Sportsman		2nd
2009	Florida Winter Tour — Comer Cadet		1st
2010	WSK Nations Cup — 60 Mini		6th
2010	Rotax Max Challenge Northeast Regional Series — Mini Max		1st
2010	MSA Formula Kart Stars — Cadet		8th
2010	Super 1 National Championship — Comer Cadet		7th
2011	SKUSA SuperNationals — Junior		15th
2011	WSK Master Series — 60 Mini	Lenzokart	8th
2011	Andrea Margutti Trophy — 60 Mini	Luxor Racing Team	14th
2012	Rotax Max Challenge Grand Finals — Junior		62nd
2012	WSK Euro Series — KF3		11th
2012	CIK-FIA European Championship — KF3		6th

== Racing record ==
=== Career summary ===
Season	Series	Team	Races	Wins	Poles	F/Laps	Podiums	Points	Position
2012–13	SBF2000 Winter Series	?	10	3	3	4	6	-	NC
2013	F2000 Championship	?	8	0	1	0	4	288	5th
2014	FIA Formula 3 European Championship	EuroInternational	20	0	0	0	0	24	19th
2014	German Formula 3 Championship	EuroInternational	5	0	0	0	1	33	10th
2014	British Formula 3 Championship	Fortec Motorsport	3	2	1	2	3	-	NC^{†}
2014	Macau Grand Prix	Fortec Motorsport	1	0	0	0	0	N/A	8th
2015	FIA Formula 3 European Championship	Mücke Motorsport	33	0	0	1	1	91	11th
2015	Macau Grand Prix	Mücke Motorsport	1	0	0	0	0	N/A	6th
2015	Toyota Racing Series	Giles Motorsport	16	1	0	2	6	765	**3rd**
2016	GP3 Series	DAMS	18	0	0	0	1	36	12th
2016	Formula One	Haas F1 Team	Test/Reserve driver						
2017	FIA Formula 2 Championship	Trident	10	0	0	0	0	4	22nd
2017	GP3 Series	DAMS	6	0	0	0	0	3	19th
2017	Formula One	Haas F1 Team	Development driver						
2018	FIA Formula 2 Championship	Trident	13	0	0	0	0	7	19th
2018	IndyCar Series	Dale Coyne Racing	4	0	0	0	0	66	27th
2018	Formula One	Haas F1 Team	Development driver						
2019	IndyCar Series	Dale Coyne Racing	17	0	0	0	0	351	13th
2020	IndyCar Series	Dale Coyne Racing with Vasser-Sullivan	14	0	0	0	0	290	13th
2021	NASCAR Xfinity Series	Sam Hunt Racing	7	0	0	N/A	N/A	122	37th
2021	IndyCar Series	Rahal Letterman Lanigan Racing	5	0	0	1	0	146	24th
2022	IndyCar Series	Rahal Letterman Lanigan Racing	1	0	0	0	0	71	28th
2022	IndyCar Series	Dreyer & Reinbold Racing	1	0	0	0	0	71	28th
2022	IndyCar Series	Juncos Hollinger Racing	1	0	0	0	0	71	28th
2022	NASCAR Xfinity Series	Sam Hunt Racing	2	0	0	0	0	22	60th
2023	IndyCar Series	A. J. Foyt Enterprises	17	0	0	0	1	214	19th
2024	IndyCar Series	A. J. Foyt Enterprises	17	0	1	0	0	367	9th
2025	IndyCar Series	A. J. Foyt Enterprises	17	0	0	0	2	293	16th
2026	IndyCar Series	A. J. Foyt Enterprises	18	0	0	0	0	280	17th

^{†} As Ferrucci was a guest driver, he was ineligible to score championship points.

^{*} Season still in progress.

=== Complete FIA Formula 3 European Championship results ===
(key) (Races in bold indicate pole position) (Races in italics indicate fastest lap)

Year	Entrant	Engine	1	2	3	4	5	6	7	8	9	10	11	12	13	14	15	16	17	18	19	20	21	22	23	24	25	26	27	28	29	30	31	32	33	DC	Points
2014	EuroInternational	Mercedes	SIL; 1	SIL; 2	SIL; 3	HOC; 1	HOC; 2	HOC; 3	PAU; 1	PAU; 2	PAU; 3	HUN; 1	HUN; 2	HUN; 3	SPA; 1 Ret	SPA; 2 DNS	SPA; 3; 15	NOR; 1; 12	NOR; 2; 5	NOR; 3; 4	MSC; 1; 16	MSC; 2; 13	MSC; 3; 14	RBR; 1 Ret	RBR; 2; 12	RBR; 3; 20	NÜR; 1; 9	NÜR; 2; 17	NÜR; 3; 14	IMO; 1 Ret	IMO; 2 Ret	IMO; 3; 16	HOC; 1; 19	HOC; 2; 17	HOC; 3; 15	19th	24
2015	kfzteile24 Mücke Motorsport	Mercedes	SIL; 1; 18	SIL; 2; 9	SIL; 3; 13	HOC; 1; 10	HOC; 2; 6	HOC; 3; 28	PAU; 1 Ret	PAU; 2; 11	PAU; 3; 10	MNZ; 1 Ret	MNZ; 2; 4	MNZ; 3; 8	SPA; 1; 4	SPA; 2; 2	SPA; 3; 12	NOR; 1 Ret	NOR; 2 Ret	NOR; 3; 6	ZAN; 1; 28	ZAN; 2; 8	ZAN; 3; 9	RBR; 1; 12	RBR; 2; 13	RBR; 3; 11	ALG; 1; 7	ALG; 2; 10	ALG; 3 Ret	NÜR; 1; 7	NÜR; 2; 7	NÜR; 3; 7	HOC; 1; 10	HOC; 2; 17	HOC; 3 Ret	11th	91

=== Complete Toyota Racing Series results ===
(key) (Races in bold indicate pole position) (Races in italics indicate fastest lap)

Year	Team	1	2	3	4	5	6	7	8	9	10	11	12	13	14	15	16	DC	Points
2015	Giles Motorsport	RUA; 1; 7	RUA; 2; 5	RUA; 3; 4	TER; 1 Ret	TER; 2; 17	TER; 3; 2	HMP; 1; 3	HMP; 2; 3	HMP; 3; 5	TAU; 1; 2	TAU; 2; 2	TAU; 3; 8	TAU; 4; 16	MAN; 1; 5	MAN; 2; 1	MAN; 3; 5	3rd	765

=== Complete GP3 Series results ===
(key) (Races in bold indicate pole position) (Races in italics indicate fastest lap)

Year	Entrant	1	2	3	4	5	6	7	8	9	10	11	12	13	14	15	16	17	18	Pos	Points
2016	DAMS	CAT; FEA; 15	CAT; SPR; 11	RBR; FEA; 15	RBR; SPR; 10	SIL; FEA; 18	SIL; SPR; 4	HUN; FEA; 15	HUN; SPR; 11	HOC; FEA; 9	HOC; SPR; 4	SPA; FEA; 7	SPA; SPR; 3	MNZ; FEA; 19†	MNZ; SPR; 11	SEP; FEA; Ret	SEP; SPR; Ret	YMC; FEA; 9	YMC; SPR; 15	12th	36
2017	DAMS	CAT; FEA; 9	CAT; SPR; 8	RBR; FEA; Ret	RBR; SPR; 13	SIL; FEA; Ret	SIL; SPR; 9	HUN; FEA	HUN; SPR	SPA; FEA	SPA; SPR	MNZ; FEA	MNZ; SPR	JER; FEA	JER; SPR	YMC; FEA	YMC; SPR			19th	3

^{†} Driver did not finish the race but was classified as he completed over 90% of the race distance.

=== Complete FIA Formula 2 Championship results ===
(key) (Races in bold indicate pole position) (Races in italics indicate points for the fastest lap of top ten finishers)

Year	Entrant	1	2	3	4	5	6	7	8	9	10	11	12	13	14	15	16	17	18	19	20	21	22	23	24	DC	Points
2017	Trident	BHR; FEA	BHR; SPR	CAT; FEA	CAT; SPR	MON; FEA	MON; SPR	BAK; FEA	BAK; SPR	RBR; FEA	RBR; SPR	SIL; FEA	SIL; SPR	HUN; FEA; 9	HUN; SPR; 14	SPA; FEA; 9	SPA; SPR; 10	MNZ; FEA; Ret	MNZ; SPR; 14	JER; FEA; Ret	JER; SPR; 13	YMC; FEA; 14	YMC; SPR; 15			22nd	4
2018	Trident	BHR; FEA; 14	BHR; SPR; 20	BAK; FEA; 11	BAK; SPR; 6	CAT; FEA; DNS	CAT; SPR; 11	MON; FEA; 13	MON; SPR; 12†	LEC; FEA; 13	LEC; SPR; 9	RBR; FEA; 10	RBR; SPR; 7	SIL; FEA; 16	SIL; SPR; DSQ	HUN; FEA	HUN; SPR	SPA; FEA	SPA; SPR	MNZ; FEA	MNZ; SPR	SOC; FEA	SOC; SPR	YMC; FEA	YMC; SPR	19th	7

^{†} Driver did not finish the race but was classified as he completed over 90% of the race distance.

=== American open-wheel racing results ===
(key) (Races in bold indicate pole position) (Races in italics indicate fastest lap)

==== IndyCar Series ====
(key)

Year	Team	No.	Chassis	Engine	1	2	3	4	5	6	7	8	9	10	11	12	13	14	15	16	17	18	Rank	Points	Ref
2018	Dale Coyne Racing	19	Dallara DW12	Honda	STP	PHX	LBH	ALA	IMS	INDY	DET; 22	DET; 20	TXS	ROA	IOW	TOR	MOH	POC	GTW				27th	66	
2018	Dale Coyne Racing	39	Dallara DW12	Honda																POR; 20	SNM; 11		27th	66	
2019	Dale Coyne Racing	19	Dallara DW12	Honda	STP; 9	COA; 20	ALA; 15	LBH; 21	IMS; 10	INDY; 7	DET; 19	DET; 10	TXS; 4	RDA; 19	TOR; 11	IOW; 12	MOH; 12	POC; 4	GTW; 4	POR; 17	LAG; 24		13th	351	
2020	Dale Coyne Racing w/ Vasser-Sullivan	18	Dallara DW12	Honda	TXS; 21	IMS; 9	ROA; 6	ROA; 6	IOW; 13	IOW; 18	INDY; 4	GTW; 16	GTW; 10	MOH; 14	MOH; 14	IMS; 15	IMS; 12	STP; 23					13th	290	
2021	Rahal Letterman Lanigan Racing	45	Dallara DW12	Honda	ALA	STP	TXS	TXS	IMS	INDY; 6	DET; 6	DET; 10	ROA	MOH; 9	NSH; 11	IMS	GTW	POR	LAG	LBH			24th	146	
2022	Rahal Letterman Lanigan Racing	45	Dallara DW12	Honda	STP	TXS; 9	LBH	ALA	IMS														28th	71	
2022	Dreyer & Reinbold Racing	23	Dallara DW12	Chevrolet						INDY; 10													28th	71	
2022	Juncos Hollinger Racing	77	Dallara DW12	Chevrolet							DET; 21	ROA	MOH	TOR	IOW	IOW	IMS	NSH	GTW	POR	LAG		28th	71	
2023	A. J. Foyt Enterprises	14	Dallara DW12	Chevrolet	STP; 24	TXS; 21	LBH; 11	ALA; 20	IMS; 21	INDY; 3	DET; 21	ROA; 16	MOH; 24	TOR; 17	IOW; 26	IOW; 22	NSH; 18	IMS; 23	GTW; 13	POR; 16	LAG; 17		19th	214	
2024	A. J. Foyt Enterprises	14	Dallara DW12	Chevrolet	STP; 9	THE; DNQ	LBH; 21	ALA; 7	IMS; 27	INDY; 8	DET; 9	ROA; 15	LAG; 9	MOH; 10	IOW; 6	IOW; 11	TOR; 20	GTW; 12	**POR**; 8	MIL; 4	MIL; 4	NSH; 6	9th	367	
2025	A. J. Foyt Enterprises	14	Dallara DW12	Chevrolet	STP; 14	THE; 14	LBH; 11	ALA; 18	IMS; 20	INDY; 5	DET; 2	GTW; 5	ROA; 3	MOH; 16	IOW; 8	IOW; 15	TOR; DNS	LAG; 22	POR; 27	MIL; 14	NSH; 8		16th	293	
2026	A. J. Foyt Enterprises	14	Dallara DW12	Chevrolet	STP; 24	PHX; 11	ARL; 17	ALA; 8	LBH; 18	IMS; 14	INDY; 8	DET; 23	GTW; 13	ROA; 9	MOH; 19	NSH; 13	POR; 21	MRK; 10	WSH; 21	MIL; 20	MIL; 12	LAG; 12	17th	280	

==== Indianapolis 500 ====
Year	Chassis	Engine	Start	Finish	Team
2019	Dallara	Honda	23	7	Dale Coyne Racing
2020	Dallara	Honda	19	4	Dale Coyne Racing w/ Vasser-Sullivan
2021	Dallara	Honda	23	6	Rahal Letterman Lanigan Racing
2022	Dallara	Chevrolet	15	10	Dreyer & Reinbold Racing
2023	Dallara	Chevrolet	4	3	A. J. Foyt Enterprises
2024	Dallara	Chevrolet	6	8	A. J. Foyt Enterprises
2025	Dallara	Chevrolet	15	5	A. J. Foyt Enterprises
2026	Dallara	Chevrolet	5	8	A. J. Foyt Enterprises

=== NASCAR ===
(key) (Bold – Pole position awarded by qualifying time. Italics – Pole position earned by points standings or practice time. * – Most laps led.)

==== Xfinity Series ====
NASCAR Xfinity Series results
Year	Team	No.	Make	1	2	3	4	5	6	7	8	9	10	11	12	13	14	15	16	17	18	19	20	21	22	23	24	25	26	27	28	29	30	31	32	33	NXSC	Pts	Ref
2021	Sam Hunt Racing	26	Toyota	DAY	DRC	HOM; 30	LVS; 13	PHO; 15	ATL; 15	MAR	TAL	DAR	DOV	COA	CLT	MOH	TEX	NSH	POC; 14	ROA	ATL; 33	NHA	GLN	IRC	MCH	DAY	DAR	RCH	BRI	LVS	TAL; 17	ROV	TEX	KAN	MAR	PHO	37th	122	
2022	Sam Hunt Racing	26	Toyota	DAY	CAL	LVS	PHO	ATL	COA	RCH	MAR	TAL	DOV	DAR	TEX	CLT	PIR	NSH	ROA	ATL	NHA	POC; 35	IRC; 17	MCH	GLN	DAY	DAR	KAN	BRI	TEX	TAL	ROV	LVS	HOM	MAR	PHO	60th	22	

^{*} Season still in progress
^{1} Ineligible for series points

Sporting positions
Preceded by Robert Wickens	Indianapolis 500; Rookie of the Year; 2019	Succeeded by Patricio O'Ward
