= 2015 F2000 Championship Series =

2015 F2000 Championship season

Seasons
- ← 2014 2016 →

The 2015 F2000 Championship Series season is the tenth season of competition for the series.

21 year-old American Sam Beasley won all but two races of the fourteen round championship, dominating his way to the title. Second place Eric Filgueras was held winless and finished well back in the Championship. Canadian Steve Bamford won the Masters Championship for drivers over 40 years old and finished third overall in points with one win.

== Race calendar and results ==
Round	Circuit	Location	Date	Pole position	Fastest lap	Winning driver
1	Road Atlanta	(United States) Braselton, Georgia	April 11	(United States) Sam Beasley	(United States) John LaRue	(United States) David Grant
2	Road Atlanta	(United States) Braselton, Georgia	April 12	(United States) Sam Beasley	(United States) Sam Beasley	(United States) Sam Beasley
3	Watkins Glen International	(United States) Watkins Glen, New York	May 15	(United States) Tim Paul	(Canada) Steve Bamford	(Canada) Steve Bamford
4	Watkins Glen International	(United States) Watkins Glen, New York	May 16	(United States) David Grant	(Canada) Steve Bamford	(United States) Sam Beasley
5	Virginia International Raceway	(United States) Alton, Virginia	June 6	(United States) Sam Beasley	(United States) Sam Beasley	(United States) Sam Beasley
6	Virginia International Raceway	(United States) Alton, Virginia	June 7	(United States) Sam Beasley	(Canada) Steve Bamford	(United States) Sam Beasley
7	Mid-Ohio Sports Car Course	(United States) Lexington, Ohio	July 4	(United States) Sam Beasley	(United States) John LaRue	(United States) Sam Beasley
8	Mid-Ohio Sports Car Course	(United States) Lexington, Ohio	July 5	(United States) John LaRue	(United States) Sam Beasley	(United States) Sam Beasley
9	Pittsburgh International Race Complex	(United States) Wampum, Pennsylvania	August 1	(United States) Sam Beasley	(United States) Sam Beasley	(United States) Sam Beasley
10	Pittsburgh International Race Complex	(United States) Wampum, Pennsylvania	August 2	(United States) Sam Beasley	(United States) Sam Beasley	(United States) Sam Beasley
11	New Jersey Motorsports Park	(United States) Millville, New Jersey	August 29	(United States) Sam Beasley	(United States) Sam Beasley	(United States) Sam Beasley
12	New Jersey Motorsports Park	(United States) Millville, New Jersey	August 30	(United States) Sam Beasley	(United States) Sam Beasley	(United States) Sam Beasley
13	Pittsburgh International Race Complex	(United States) Wampum, Pennsylvania	October 17	(United States) Sam Beasley	(United States) Sam Beasley	(United States) Sam Beasley
14	Pittsburgh International Race Complex	(United States) Wampum, Pennsylvania	October 18	(United States) Eric Filgueiras	(United States) Sam Beasley	(United States) Sam Beasley

== Final standings ==
Pos.	Driver	(United States) ATL		(United States) WGI		(United States) VIR		(United States) MOH		(United States) PIT1		(United States) NJMP		(United States) PIT2		Points
1	(United States) Sam Beasley	19	1	2	1	1	1	1	1	1	1	1	1	1	1	593
2	(United States) Eric Filgueiras	7	2	6	3	3	4	7	5	2	13	4	2	4	5	423
3	(Canada) Steve Bamford (M)	2	3	1	5	17	2	18	14	3	2	3	7	2	18	415
4	(United States) Austin McCusker	3	5	4	4	2	6	4	6	6	4	6	12	3	6	399
5	(United States) David Grant	1	8	3	2	5	3			7	9	7	4	20	3	374
6	(United States) Quinlan Lall	23	DNS	7	9	6	8	17	4	8	8	5	8	6	2	324
7	(United States) Trent Walko	8	13	8	7	4	5	5	2	4	3	18	17	18	17	318
8	(United States) Sam Chastain	6	4	9	22	7	17	3	21	21	19	2	5	8	13	266
9	(United States) Dave Weitzenhof (M)	10	9	10	11	12	13	10	17	12	14	9	9	12	9	240
10	(United States) John McCusker	5	6	18	22	20		DNS	19	5	7	16	3	5	4	232
11	(United States) Dan Denison (M)	11	11			11	10	11	11	13	12			11	8	192
12	(United States) Bob Reid (M)	20	14	17	15	14	11	15	10	17	10			14	7	173
13	(United States) Steve Jenks (M)	14	10	11	DNS	9	16	9	8	10	18					155
14	(United States) Brandon Dixon (M)							13	16	9	5	8	15	7	16	152
15	(United States) Nick Palacio					8	7			19	6	11	6			130
16	(United States) Chris Gumprecht	22		19	14	16	15	DNS	18	11	11	13	13	DNS		121
17	(United States) Charles Finelli (M)	15	15	14	21	10	9							15	14	108
18	(United States) John LaRue	4	16					2	20							92
19	(United States) Robert Wright (M)	23		25	DNS	19	18	12	9	20	DNS	15	14	16	10	90
20	(United States) Mauro Fauza (M)	25	20	22	18			14	13			10	11			87
21	(Barbados) Brent Gilkes (M)	12	17	16	12							14	10			87
22	(United States) Brendan Puderbach	16	19	20	16	15	12	19	15					22	DNS	67
23	(United States) Tim Paul			5	6											63
24	(United States) Robert Allaer (M)							8	3							62
25	(United States) Alan Guibord (M)	13		12	8											57
26	(United States) Kevin Kopp							6	7							56
27	(United States) Spencer Brockman	9	7													50
28	(United States) Peter Gonzalez (M)									15	17	12	DNS	21	15	49
29	(United States) Jonathan Teixeira	17	18									DNS	16	17	11	46
30	(United States) Matt Machiko													9	12	40
31	(United States) Michael Riley			23	20	13	14									37
32	(Canada) Jim Hallman (M)	21	21	24	19									13	DNS	37
33	(United States) Dean Baker			13	10											36
34	(United States) Danny Weyls (M)							16	12							27
35	(United States) Michael DeQuesada	18	12													25
36	(United States) Charles Anti									14	16					23
37	(United States) Neil Verhagen													10	DNS	21
38	(United States) Craig Clawson			15	13											16
39	(United States) Chris Monteleone			21	17											14
40	(United States) Devin Lesueur									18	15					12
41	(United States) Tom Fatur (M)									16	DNS					10
42	(United States) John Dole (M)													19		7
43	(United States) Drew Heffring											17				1
	(United States) Davy D'addario	DNS														
Pos.	Driver	(United States) ATL		(United States) WGI		(United States) VIR		(United States) MOH		(United States) PIT1		(United States) NJMP		(United States) PIT2		Points
