= John LaRue =

Early settler of Kentucky

- Born: January 24, 1746; Frederick County, Colony of Virginia, British America
- Died: January 4, 1792 (aged 45); LaRue County, Kentucky
- Occupations: Landowner, surveyor
- Known for: Pioneer of Hodgenville, Kentucky

John P. LaRue (1746–1792) was a Kentucky pioneer and member of the LaRue family of Virginia.

== Biography ==
John LaRue was the second child of Isaac and Phebe (Carman) LaRue, born in Frederick County, Virginia on January 24, 1746. He grew up on his father's farm, where there was plenty of work to be done, and few opportunities for acquiring an education. John owned land in Spottsylvania County, Virginia, and served as an officer in the Virginia Militia during the Revolutionary War. After leaving the militia, in 1779 John and his brother Samuel built a cabin along Guist Creek, about five miles north of Squire Boone's Station in what is now Shelby County, Kentucky. John married Mary Brooks (1766–1843) of Virginia in 1783 and took her back to Kentucky a year later, after selling his land in Spottsylvania County.

They settled at Nolin Station, located at the mouth of Beach Fork, fifty miles from the station at the Falls of the Ohio, and about one mile from what would become the town of Hodgenville. Nolin Station was a small settlement and the site of a stockade fort, established just three years before in 1781. The fort was known as Phillips' Fort, because it was built on land owned by Phillip Phillips. With the help of Squire Boone, a prominent surveyor and brother of Daniel Boone, John acquired large tracts of lands in Shelby County and elsewhere, eventually laying claim to some 40,000 acres.

John died on his plantation outside of Hodgenville on January 4, 1792, and was buried in the old Phillips Fort Cemetery. In 1843 the state legislature established LaRue County, Kentucky, which was named in honor of John by his grandson, John LaRue Helm, who was serving as the speaker of the house at the time.

In 1809, John's widow, Mary, who by this time had remarried, served as the midwife for the birth of Abraham Lincoln on the nearby Sinking Spring Farm. John's daughter, Maraget LaRue Walters (1789–1864), is also believed to have been present, as well as his niece, Rebecca Hodgen Kieth (1784–1845).

== See also ==
- LaRue family
