= 2024 Stock Car Pro Series =

Season of stock car racing

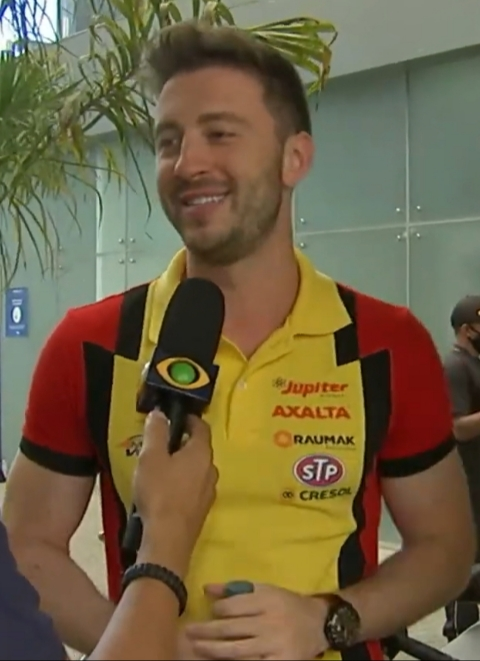
Gabriel Casagrande won his third championship in four seasons.

The 2024 Stock Car Pro Series was the 46th season of the Stock Car Pro Series, the premier touring car racing series in Brazil, and the third season under the Stock Car Pro Series moniker. Gabriel Casagrande was the defending champion. The championship started in Autódromo Internacional Ayrton Senna, Goiânia and concluded at Interlagos Circuit, São Paulo.

== Calendar ==
The calendar for the 2024 season was revealed on 1 December 2023. On 19 June 2024, the calendar was updated, in which the round at Santa Cruz do Sul was removed, the Velopark round was shifted into the September slot previously vacated by Santa Cruz do Sul, and the Stock Car Pro Series went to Uruguay for the first time in its history by the addition of the El Pinar round, and the venue of penultimate round was uncertain. On 25 September 2024, it was announced that the third Goiânia round replaced the planned round at Autódromo Brasília BRB.

Round	Circuit (Event)	Dates	Map
1	Autódromo Internacional Ayrton Senna; Goiânia, Goiás	2–3 March	2024 Stock Car Pro Series is located in South America
2	(São Paulo (state)) Autódromo Velo Città; Mogi Guaçu, São Paulo	23–24 March	2024 Stock Car Pro Series is located in South America
3	(São Paulo (state)) Autódromo José Carlos Pace (GP ArcelorMittal Interlagos Stock Car); São Paulo, São Paulo	20–21 April	2024 Stock Car Pro Series is located in South America
4	(Paraná (state)) Autódromo Internacional de Cascavel; Cascavel, Paraná	18–19 May	2024 Stock Car Pro Series is located in South America
5	(São Paulo (state)) Autódromo Velo Città; Mogi Guaçu, São Paulo	29–30 June	2024 Stock Car Pro Series is located in South America
6	Autódromo Internacional Ayrton Senna; Goiânia, Goiás	27–28 July	2024 Stock Car Pro Series is located in South America
7	Belo Horizonte Street Circuit (BH Stock Festival); Belo Horizonte, Minas Gerais	17–18 August	2024 Stock Car Pro Series is located in South America
8	Velopark; Nova Santa Rita, Rio Grande do Sul	7–8 September	2024 Stock Car Pro Series is located in South America
9	Autódromo Oscar y Juan Gálvez; Buenos Aires, Argentina	5–6 October	2024 Stock Car Pro Series is located in South America
10	Autódromo Víctor Borrat Fabini; El Pinar, Uruguay	25–26 October	2024 Stock Car Pro Series is located in South America
11	Autódromo Internacional Ayrton Senna; Goiânia, Goiás	23–24 November	2024 Stock Car Pro Series is located in South America
12	(São Paulo (state)) Autódromo José Carlos Pace (Super Final); São Paulo, São Paulo	14–15 December	2024 Stock Car Pro Series is located in South America

== Teams and drivers ==
All teams and drivers were Brazilian-registered.

Championship entries
Team	Car	No.	Drivers	Rounds
KTF Sports	Chevrolet Cruze	0	Cacá Bueno	1–3, 5–12
KTF Sports	Chevrolet Cruze	80	Marcos Gomes	3, 9–11
KTF Sports	Chevrolet Cruze	97	Bruna Tomaselli	12
KTF Racing	Chevrolet Cruze	38	Zezinho Muggiati	All
KTF Racing	Chevrolet Cruze	85	Guilherme Salas	1–8, 11–12
Pole Motorsport	Chevrolet Cruze	4	Júlio Campos	All
Pole Motorsport	Chevrolet Cruze	51	Átila Abreu	All
TMG Racing	Chevrolet Cruze	8	Rafael Suzuki	All
TMG Racing	Chevrolet Cruze	19	Felipe Massa	All
RCM Motorsport	Toyota Corolla	10	Ricardo Zonta	All
RCM Motorsport	Toyota Corolla	44	Bruno Baptista	All
Cavaleiro Sports	Chevrolet Cruze	11	Gaetano di Mauro	All
Cavaleiro Sports	Chevrolet Cruze	33	Nelson Piquet Jr.	All
A.Mattheis; Vogel	Chevrolet Cruze	12	Lucas Foresti	All
A.Mattheis; Vogel	Chevrolet Cruze	83	Gabriel Casagrande	All
Blau Motosport	Chevrolet Cruze	18	Allam Khodair	All
Blau Motosport	Chevrolet Cruze	88	Felipe Fraga	All
Ipiranga Racing	Toyota Corolla	21	Thiago Camilo	All
Ipiranga Racing	Toyota Corolla	30	César Ramos	All
Crown Racing	Toyota Corolla	28	Enzo Elias	All
Crown Racing	Toyota Corolla	121	Felipe Baptista	All
Eurofarma RC	Chevrolet Cruze	29	Daniel Serra	All
Eurofarma RC	Chevrolet Cruze	90	Ricardo Mauricio	All
Wokin Garra Racing	Chevrolet Cruze	35	Gabriel Robe	1–4
Wokin Garra Racing	Chevrolet Cruze	95	Lucas Kohl	All
Wokin Garra Racing	Chevrolet Cruze	113	Witold Ramasauskas	12
RTX Racing	Chevrolet Cruze	37	Raphael Teixeira	1, 4–6
Full Time Sports	Toyota Corolla	81	Arthur Leist	All
Full Time Sports	Toyota Corolla	101	Gianluca Petecof	All
Mobil Ale Full Time	Toyota Corolla	91	Eduardo Barrichello	All
Mobil Ale Full Time	Toyota Corolla	111	Rubens Barrichello	All
Scuderia Chiarelli	Toyota Corolla	99	Luan Lopes	3
Scuderia Chiarelli	Toyota Corolla	120	Vitor Baptista	2–12

=== Team changes ===
Full Time Sports downsized from five cars to four cars. The vacant slot was purchased by a new team called RTX Racing, which debuted in the 2024 season. Hot Car Competições left the series after twenty-two years and was replaced by Garra Racing, that debuted in the Stock Car Pro Series after three titles in the Stock Series.

TMG Racing reverted to its original name after competing in two seasons under the Lubrax Podium Stock Team name.

=== Driver changes ===
Tony Kanaan left Full Time Sports at the end of the 2023 season and moved to the United States to work in Arrow McLaren as director. FTS reserve driver Arthur Leist moved to the team, replacing Kanaan. Matias Rossi did not return to the championship, and instead focused on Turismo Carretera.

Júlio Campos and Rafael Suzuki changed places. Campos moved to Pole Motorsport while Suzuki took his place at TMG Racing.

Denis Navarro and Marcos Gomes retired from full-time driving at Cavaleiro Sports at the end of 2023 and were replaced by Nelson Piquet Jr. and Gaetano di Mauro. Piquet Jr. left Crown Racing and Di Mauro left Hot Car Competições.

Felipe Baptista replaced Piquet Jr. and left KTF Sports. Baptista's seat was taken by reigning Stock Series champion Zezinho Muggiati.

Lucas Kohl moved to Garra Racing after the team took the place left by Hot Car Competições. The second car was taken by Stock Series graduate Gabriel Robe.

Raphael Teixeira departed Scuderia Chiarelli to join ASR Racing. Teixeira was replaced by Vitor Baptista.

=== Mid-season changes ===
Scuderia Chiarelli did not participate in the first round due to a lack of sponsors. ASR Racing competed at the first round with just one car. Initially renewed for another season with KTF Sports, Rodrigo Baptista did not participate in the first round due a disagreement with the team and his principal sponsor.

Bruna Tomaselli replaced Marcos Gomes for the final round of the season after Gomes suffered a medical episode; Tomaselli became the first female driver to compete in the championship since Ana Beatriz de Figueiredo in 2019.

== Results and standings ==
=== Season summary ===
Round		Circuit	Date	Pole position	Fastest lap	Winning driver	Winning team
1	R1	(Goiás) Goiânia	March 3		Júlio Campos	Rafael Suzuki	TMG Racing
1	R2	(Goiás) Goiânia	March 3	Felipe Baptista	Felipe Baptista	Felipe Baptista	Crown Racing
2	R1	(São Paulo (state)) Mogi Guaçu	March 24		Ricardo Zonta	Felipe Massa	TMG Racing
2	R2	(São Paulo (state)) Mogi Guaçu	March 24	Daniel Serra	' race cancelled due to adverse weather conditions, rescheduled to 30 June		
3	R1	(São Paulo (state)) Interlagos	April 21		Felipe Massa	César Ramos	Ipiranga Racing
3	R2	(São Paulo (state)) Interlagos	April 21	Marcos Gomes	Rafael Suzuki	Gaetano di Mauro	Cavaleiro Sports
4	R1	(Paraná (state)) Cascavel	May 19		Eduardo Barrichello	Eduardo Barrichello	Mobil Ale Full Time
4	R2	(Paraná (state)) Cascavel	May 19	Daniel Serra	Daniel Serra	Bruno Baptista	RCM Motorsport
5	R2	(São Paulo (state)) Mogi Guaçu	June 30		Daniel Serra	Daniel Serra	Eurofarma RC
5	R1	(São Paulo (state)) Mogi Guaçu	June 30		Thiago Camilo	Gaetano di Mauro	Cavaleiro Sports
5	R2	(São Paulo (state)) Mogi Guaçu	June 30	Júlio Campos	Ricardo Maurício	Júlio Campos	Pole Motorsports
6	R1	(Goiás) Goiânia	July 28		Eduardo Barrichello	Eduardo Barrichello	Mobil Ale Full Time
6	R2	(Goiás) Goiânia	July 28	Gabriel Casagrande	Daniel Serra	Gabriel Casagrande	A.Mattheis Vogel
7	R1	(Minas Gerais) Belo Horizonte	August 18		Arthur Leist	Thiago Camilo	Ipiranga Racing
7	R2	(Minas Gerais) Belo Horizonte	August 18	Daniel Serra	Felipe Baptista	Felipe Baptista	Crown Racing
8	R1	(Rio Grande do Sul) Nova Santa Rita	September 8		Gianluca Petecof	Gianluca Petecof	Full Time Sports
8	R2	(Rio Grande do Sul) Nova Santa Rita	September 8	Rafael Suzuki	Daniel Serra	Vitor Baptista	Scuderia Chiarelli
9	R1	(Argentina) Buenos Aires	October 6		Daniel Serra	Daniel Serra	Eurofarma RC
9	R2	(Argentina) Buenos Aires	October 6	Rafael Suzuki	Rafael Suzuki	Gabriel Casagrande	A.Mattheis Vogel
10	R1	(Uruguay) El Pinar	October 26		Enzo Elias	Enzo Elias	Crown Racing
10	R2	(Uruguay) El Pinar	October 26	Felipe Fraga	Gianluca Petecof	Felipe Fraga	Blau Motosport
11	R1	(Goiás) Goiânia	November 24		Thiago Camilo	Thiago Camilo	Ipiranga Racing
11	R2	(Goiás) Goiânia	November 24	Gaetano di Mauro	Ricardo Maurício	Gaetano di Mauro	Cavaleiro Sports
12	R1	(São Paulo (state)) Interlagos	December 15		Thiago Camilo	Felipe Baptista	Crown Racing
12	R2	(São Paulo (state)) Interlagos	December 15	Guilherme Salas	Júlio Campos	Guilherme Salas	KTF Racing

=== Championship standings ===
Points system

Points are awarded for each race at an event to the driver/s of a car that completed at least 75% of the race distance and was running at the completion of the race. Before the last round, the two worst results are discarded. Races in which a driver has been disqualified cannot be discarded. The first race of each event is held with partially reversed top twelve grid.

Points format	Position																														
Points format	1st	2nd	3rd	4th	5th	6th	7th	8th	9th	10th	11th	12th	13th	14th	15th	16th	17th	18th	19th	20th	21st	22nd	23rd	24th	25th	26th	27th	28th	29th	30th	Pole
Sprint Race	55	50	46	42	38	36	34	32	30	28	26	24	22	20	18	16	14	13	12	11	10	9	8	7	6	5	4	3	2	1	
Main Race	80	74	69	64	59	55	51	47	43	40	37	34	31	28	25	22	19	17	15	13	12	11	10	9	8	7	6	5	4	3	2

Drivers' Championship

Pos	Driver	(Goiás) GOI1		(São Paulo (state)) MGG1		(São Paulo (state)) INT1		(Paraná (state)) CSC		(São Paulo (state)) MGG2			(Goiás) GOI2		(Minas Gerais) BLH		(Rio Grande do Sul) VEL		(Argentina) BUA		(Uruguay) ELP		(Goiás) GOI3		(São Paulo (state)) INT2		Pts
Pos	Driver	S	M	S	M	S	M	S	M	M	S	M	S	M	S	M	S	M	S	M	S	M	S	M	S	M	Pts
1	Gabriel Casagrande	4	3	18	C	Ret	13	6	7	15	Ret	4	25†	**1**	16	13	3	11	7	1	7	3	12	15	4	3	926
2	Felipe Massa	23	2	1	C	2	15	16	6	25	4	9	7	2	13	9	DSQ	DSQ	3	3	21	4	14	13	5	2	885
3	Eduardo Barrichello	18	9	Ret	C	14	9	1	10	5	2	10	1	14	4	6	20†	5	Ret	19	8	2	23	11	7	6	868
4	Ricardo Zonta	5	19	2	C	5	6	2	5	4	20	14	3	10	17	11	12	Ret	2	10	10	6	10	19	2	10	864
5	Júlio Campos	2	6	12	C	7	5	11	26	12	11	**1**	2	9	14	18	Ret	3	Ret	11	11	8	11	10	3	25†	835
6	Felipe Baptista	19	**1**	7	C	9	3	8	20	2	6	3	17	Ret	DSQ	1	DSQ	DSQ	Ret	24†	13	7	6	7	1	11	806
7	Rafael Suzuki	1	15	5	C	12	2	5	3	Ret	Ret	27	8	7	10	7	DSQ	**DSQ**	17	**23**	5	5	4	9	8	5	790
8	Daniel Serra	Ret	Ret	8	**C**	15	16	7	**21**	1	12	17	5	3	11	**10**	6	8	1	25†	2	21	15	4	26†	4	779
9	Bruno Baptista	6	7	4	C	21	Ret	17	1	6	9	7	15	5	19	16	8	6	5	4	16	13	Ret	14	18	23	767
10	Thiago Camilo	3	22	10	C	3	10	10	16	24	3	15	DSQ	Ret	1	17	4	9	Ret	2	23	14	1	12	27†	8	710
11	Enzo Elias	12	12	16	C	8	12	11	2	18	24†	2	24	4	2	Ret	DSQ	DSQ	12	8	1	18	8	Ret	9	14	692
12	Ricardo Maurício	9	Ret	6	C	Ret	11	3	4	3	18	16	13	Ret	12	8	Ret	16	13	5	20	Ret	5	2	Ret	7	687
13	Felipe Fraga	17	Ret	3	C	17	8	13	14	9	8	12	12	22	24	14	Ret	5	9	6	12	**1**	3	Ret	20	18	685
14	Rubens Barrichello	15	4	Ret	C	Ret	18	14	13	7	10	11	6	8	3	15	6	22†	10	12	6	10	24	22	23	22	645
15	Lucas Foresti	8	5	19	C	13	17	4	15	21	22	20	20	11	20	12	18	19	16	15	3	11	9	5	11	21	612
16	Gaetano di Mauro	16	Ret	20	C	26	1	15	Ret	20	1	6	10	12	9	Ret	13	17	Ret	9	9	25†	17	**1**	6	27†	611
17	César Ramos	14	13	13	C	1	24	12	22	16	7	8	9	Ret	25	5	14	23†	11	7	17	Ret	2	23	16	13	605
18	Arthur Leist	11	20	9	C	23	23	25	Ret	11	19	13	23	15	5	4	11	11	18	13	4	9	18	17	10	9	604
19	Nelson Piquet, Jr.	13	16	14	C	6	20	20	9	17	16	19	4	Ret	7	2	16	14	20	22	15	17	7	6	22	15	591
20	Guilherme Salas	10	11	21	C	4	27	9	8	13	5	5	21	21	Ret	Ret	17	15					19	3	12	**1**	585
21	Zezinho Muggiati	7	17	Ret	C	16	28	Ret	Ret	22	15	22	Ret	6	21	20	3	18	6	18	19	12	20	8	13	12	472
22	Átila Abreu	25	8	11	C	11	7	21	12	14	13	28†	16	13	22	21	20	8	22†	21	24	22	22	18	24	16	471
23	Cacá Bueno	26	14	15	C	WD	WD			8	Ret	21	19	17	6	3	21	13	8	20	26	24	13	16	15	19	429
24	Gianluca Petecof	22	18	Ret	C	19	22	18	DSQ	10	14	18	11	19	23	Ret	1	3	21	Ret	25	15	25	21	14	17	415
25	Vitor Baptista			17	C	24	14	23	Ret	19	17	25	18	16	8	Ret	7	1	19	16	14	23	16	20	21	20	391
26	Allam Khodair	27	10	24	C	18	19	19	17	23	Ret	24	14	20	15	19	19	20	4	17	18	16	21	Ret	17	Ret	349
27	Lucas Kohl	20	23	23	C	20	25	22	19	Ret	23†	26	22	18	18	Ret	22	21	15	Ret	27	20	Ret	24	25	26†	208
28	Marcos Gomes					10	**4**												14	14	22	19	Ret	25			174
29	Gabriel Robe	21	21	22	C	25	21	24	18	Ret	21	23															93
30	Bruna Tomaselli																								19	24	21
31	Luan Lopes					22	26																				16
32	Raphael Teixeira	24	Ret								DSQ	Ret	Ret	Ret	Ret												7
33	Witold Ramasauskas																								28†	Ret	3
Pos	Driver	(Goiás) GOI1		(São Paulo (state)) MGG1		(São Paulo (state)) INT1		(Paraná (state)) CSC		(São Paulo (state)) MGG2			(Goiás) GOI2		(Minas Gerais) BLH		(Rio Grande do Sul) VEL		(Argentina) BUA		(Uruguay) ELP		(Goiás) GOI3		(São Paulo (state)) INT2		Pts

Colour	Result
Gold	Winner
Silver	Second place
Bronze	Third place
Green	Points classification
Blue	Non-points classification
Blue	Non-classified finish (NC)
Purple	Retired, not classified (Ret)
Red	Did not qualify (DNQ)
Red	Did not pre-qualify (DNPQ)
Black	Disqualified (DSQ)
White	Did not start (DNS)
White	Withdrew (WD)
White	Race cancelled (C)
Blank	Did not practice (DNP)
Blank	Did not arrive (DNA)
Blank	Excluded (EX)

**Bold** – Pole position
Italics – Fastest lap
† – Retired, but classified

Teams' Championship

Pos	Driver	Pts
1	TMG Racing	1675
2	RCM Motorsport	1631
3	A.Mattheis Motorsport Vogel Motorsport	1538
4	Mobil Ale Full Time	1513
5	Crown Racing	1498
6	Eurofarma RC	1466
7	Ipiranga Racing	1315
8	Pole Motorsport	1306
9	Cavaleiro Sports	1202
10	KTF Racing	1057
11	Blau Motosport	1034
12	Full Time Sports	1019
13	KTF Sports	603
14	Scuderia Chiarelli	407
15	Wokin Garra Racing	301
16	RTX Racing	14
