= 2018 Stock Car Brasil Championship =

Car racing competition

Seasons
- ← 2017 2019 →

The 2018 Stock Car Brasil Championship was the fortieth season of the Stock Car Brasil. The season started on 10 March in Interlagos Circuit, and ended at the same circuit on 9 December. Daniel Serra of RC Competições won his second championship, with Felipe Fraga finishing runner up.

== Teams and drivers ==
All teams compete with a Chevrolet Cruze Stock Car.

Team	No.	Drivers	Rounds
Cimed Racing	0	(Brazil) Cacá Bueno	All
Cimed Racing	19	(Brazil) Felipe Massa	6
Cimed Racing	88	(Brazil) Felipe Fraga	All
Cimed Racing	86	(Argentina) Agustín Canapino	6
Prati-Donaduzzi	1	(Brazil) Antonio Pizzonia	All
Prati-Donaduzzi	4	(Brazil) Júlio Campos	All
Ipiranga Racing	3	(Brazil) Bia Figueiredo	All
Ipiranga Racing	21	(Brazil) Thiago Camilo	All
Cavaleiro Sports	5	(Brazil) Denis Navarro	All
Cavaleiro Sports	28	(Brazil) Galid Osman	All
Bardahl Hot Car	8	(Brazil) Rafael Suzuki	All
Bardahl Hot Car	20	(Brazil) Ricardo Sperafico	9–12
Bardahl Hot Car	116	(Argentina) Nestor Girolami	7–8
Bardahl Hot Car	117	(Brazil) Guilherme Salas	1–6
Vogel Motorsport	9	(Brazil) Gustavo Lima	6–12
Vogel Motorsport	25	(Brazil) Tuka Rocha	1–5
Vogel Motorsport	83	(Brazil) Gabriel Casagrande	All
Squadra G-Force	9	(Brazil) Gustavo Lima	1–5
Squadra G-Force	55	(Brazil) Sérgio Jimenez	1–5
KTF Sports	31	(Brazil) William Starostik	12
Shell V-Power	10	(Brazil) Ricardo Zonta	All
Shell V-Power	51	(Brazil) Átila Abreu	All
HERO Motorsport	11	(Brazil) Lucas Di Grassi	1–4, 6–9, 11–12
HERO Motorsport	44	(Brazil) Bruno Baptista	All
HERO Motorsport	101	(Brazil) Nonô Figueiredo	5
HERO Motorsport	344	(Argentina) Esteban Guerrieri	8, 10
HERO Motorsport	444	(Portugal) António Félix da Costa	6
HERO Motorsport	544	(Brazil) Gaetano Di Mauro	12
Cimed-ProGP	12	(Brazil) Lucas Foresti	All
Cimed-ProGP	80	(Brazil) Marcos Gomes	All
Blau Motorsport	18	(Brazil) Allam Khodair	1–9, 11–12
Blau Motorsport	24	(South Africa) Kelvin van der Linde	10
Blau Motorsport	30	(Brazil) César Ramos	All
Eurofarma RC	29	(Brazil) Daniel Serra	All
Eurofarma RC	65	(Brazil) Max Wilson	All
Full Time Bassani	33	(Brazil) Nelson Piquet Jr.	1–4, 6–12
Full Time Bassani	70	(Brazil) Diego Nunes	All
Mico's Racing	43	(Brazil) Vítor Meira	1
Mico's Racing	45	(Brazil) Fabio Carbone	2
Mico's Racing	61	(Brazil) Fernando Croce	2
Mico's Racing	84	(Brazil) Tarso Marques	1
Eisenbahn Racing Team	46	(Brazil) Vitor Genz	All
Eisenbahn Racing Team	77	(Brazil) Valdeno Brito	All
Full Time Sports	90	(Brazil) Ricardo Maurício	All
Full Time Sports	111	(Brazil) Rubens Barrichello	All
Cavaleiro Contuflex (Note: Cavaleiro Contuflex is a customer team of Cavaleiro Sports.)	110	(Brazil) Felipe Lapenna	All
Cifarma Racing (Note: Cifarma Racing is a customer team of Bardahl Hot Car.)	555	(Brazil) Renato Braga	6

First round entries
Team	No	Season driver	Wildcard driver
Cimed Racing	0	(Brazil) Cacá Bueno	(Brazil) Felipe Massa
Cimed Racing	80	(Brazil) Marcos Gomes	(Brazil) Pipo Derani
Prati-Donaduzzi	1	(Brazil) Antônio Pizzonia	(United Kingdom) Oliver Jarvis
Prati-Donaduzzi	4	(Brazil) Júlio Campos	(United Kingdom) Jamie Green
Ipiranga Racing	3	(Brazil) Bia Figueiredo	(Brazil) Beto Monteiro
Ipiranga Racing	21	(Brazil) Thiago Camilo	(Switzerland) Nico Müller
Cavaleiro Sports; Cavaleiro Contuflex	5	(Brazil) Denis Navarro	(Argentina) Franco Girolami
Cavaleiro Sports; Cavaleiro Contuflex	28	(Brazil) Galid Osman	(Argentina) Damian Fineschi
Cavaleiro Sports; Cavaleiro Contuflex	110	(Brazil) Felipe Lapenna	(Brazil) Gabriel Robe
Bardahl Hot Car	8	(Brazil) Rafael Suzuki	(France) Jean-Karl Vernay
Bardahl Hot Car	117	(Brazil) Guilherme Salas	(Argentina) Mariano Altuna
Squadra G-Force	9	(Brazil) Gustavo Lima	(Brazil) Gustavo Myasava
Squadra G-Force	55	(Brazil) Sergio Jimenez	(Brazil) Fabio Carbone
Shell Racing	10	(Brazil) Ricardo Zonta	(Belgium) Laurens Vanthoor
Shell Racing	51	(Brazil) Átila Abreu	(Australia) Mark Winterbottom
HERO Motorsport	11	(Brazil) Lucas Di Grassi	(Brazil) Augusto Farfus
HERO Motorsport	44	(Brazil) Bruno Baptista	(Brazil) Nonô Figueiredo
Cimed Racing Team	12	(Brazil) Lucas Foresti	(Belgium) Jérôme d'Ambrosio
Cimed Racing Team	88	(Brazil) Felipe Fraga	(Netherlands) Nicky Catsburg
Vogel Motorsport	25	(Brazil) Tuka Rocha	(Brazil) Raphael Matos
Vogel Motorsport	83	(Brazil) Gabriel Casagrande	(New Zealand) Chris van der Drift
Blau Motorsport	18	(Brazil) Allam Khodair	(Brazil) Alan Hellmeister
Blau Motorsport	30	(Brazil) César Ramos	(South Africa) Kelvin van der Linde
Full Time Bassani	33	(Brazil) Nelson Piquet Jr.	(Netherlands) Robin Frijns
Full Time Bassani	70	(Brazil) Diego Nunes	(Brazil) Luciano Burti
Eurofarma RC	29	(Brazil) Daniel Serra	(Brazil) João Paulo de Oliveira
Eurofarma RC	65	(Brazil) Max Wilson	(Brazil) Felipe Giaffone
Eisenbahn Racing Team	46	(Brazil) Vitor Genz	(Brazil) David Muffato
Eisenbahn Racing Team	77	(Brazil) Valdeno Brito	(Netherlands) Jeroen Bleekemolen
Full Time Sports	90	(Brazil) Ricardo Maurício	(Brazil) Felipe Nasr
Full Time Sports	111	(Brazil) Rubens Barrichello	(Portugal) Filipe Albuquerque
Mico's Racing	43	(Brazil) Vítor Meira	(Brazil) Vicente Orige
Mico's Racing	84	(Brazil) Tarso Marques	(Brazil) Fernando Croce

=== Team changes ===
- The Squadra G-Force team premiered in 2018 at Stock Car after purchasing the cars of C2 team, that did not compete in 2017.
- Full Time Sports reduced their program from six to four cars. After the team decided to withdraw the two cars of satellite team Full Time Academy. FTS and Bassani Racing still the partnership with two cars, but now without the name and sponsor of HERO, that moved to RCM Motorsport, with a new sponsor the team pass to be called Texaco Racing. Cavaleiro Sports bought one car of FTS and expanded to three cars this season.
- For this season, TMG Shell changed their name to Shell V-Power due to sponsor reasons.

=== Driver changes ===
- Denis Navarro moved to Cavaleiro Racing leaving Cimed Racing Team. Galid Osman will be his partner after left Ipiranga Racing.
- Ricardo Mauricio left Eurofarma RC after nine seasons and joined Full Time Sports. Max Wilson, was relocated to Eurofarma RC, after one season in satellite team RCM.
- Allam Khodair moved to Blau Motorsport after four season in FTS.
- Bia Figueiredo and Lucas Foresti left Full Time Academy after FTS decided to reduce your program. Figueiredo moved to Ipiranga Racing and Foresti moved to Cimed Racing Team.
- Cimed Racing decided to change the places of Felipe Fraga and Marcos Gomes, now, Gomes will race in the customer team.
- Tuka Rocha left RCM after a single season to join Vogel Motorsport.
- Sérgio Jimenez and Gustavo Lima left Bardahl Hot Car to join the newcomer team Squadra G-Force. In his places Rafael Suzuki and Guilherme Salas joined the team. Suzuki left Cavaleiro Sports, while Salas moved from Vogel Motorsport.
- Formula E champions, Lucas di Grassi and Nelson Piquet Jr. joined the series in a full season. Di Grassi joined HERO Motosport and Piquet joined Full Time Bassani. Ex GP3 Series driver Bruno Baptista also entered in the series with HERO.
- Vítor Meira and Tarso Marques returned to the series with Mico's Racing.
- Marcio Campos and Alberto Valerio will not return this season.

=== Mid-season changes ===
- After the first round, Mico's Racing changed their two drivers. Fernando Croce and Fabio Carbone entered in the places of Vítor Meira and Tarso Marques. Croce and Carbone raced in first round as wildcard drivers. After that the team not returned to the rest of the season.
- The Santa Cruz round was affected by the German Formula E round.
  - Lucas Di Grassi was replaced by Nono Figueiredo. World Touring Car Cup driver Esteban Guerrieri raced as wildcard for Hero in the eighth round and as a substitute driver of Di Grassi in the tenth race, due the Formula E tests in Valencia. Hero Motorsport also added an extra car at Corrida do Milhão with Portuguese driver António Félix da Costa and in the last round with Gaetano Di Mauro.
  - Nelson Piquet Jr's entry was withdrawn from that round. Due to the Formula E tests at Valencia, Piquet lost the practice and qualifying seasons.
- At 10ª Corrida do Milhão Pirelli, Cimed Racing had two extra drivers Felipe Massa and Agustin Canapino. Massa drove for the team in the first round. In a partner of Bardhal Hot Car and RZ Motorsport Renato Braga also raced.
- After five rounds the new team Squadra G-Force abandoned the series. Guga Lima changed to Vogel Motorsport in the place of Tuka Rocha, but Jimenez not raced until the end of the season.
- Guilherme Salas lost his place in Bardahl Hot Car, the team called the Argentine driver Nestor Girolami, who returned for the series, after two rounds was called Ricardo Sperafico.
- Due to the last round of International GT Open, Allam Khodair did not race at the tenth round. In his place Blau Motorsport called Kelvin van der Linde, who finished in third place at the first round as wildcard for the team.
- With the interest to race in 2019 season, Stock Car Light team KTF Sports entered in the series at the last round with William Starostik, who returned for the series after seven seasons.

== Race calendar and results ==
The Stock Car Brasil 2018 season schedule, announced on January 18, begins on March 10, on a Saturday, with the return of the Interlagos endurance round with two drivers. There was a three-month break between the 20 May round in Santa Cruz do Sul-RS and the 5 August "Million Real" round at Goiânia because of the 2018 FIFA World Cup. The 2018 championship was also concluded at Interlagos on 9 December, with the HERO Super Final. The Stock Light (former Brazilian Tournament Championship, which returned after 10 years) and the Campeonato Brasileiro de Marcas were the series' support divisions.

Round		Circuit	Date	Pole position	Fastest lap	Winning driver	Winning team
1		(São Paulo (state)) 4ª Corrida de Duplas 2018, Autódromo José Carlos Pace, São Paulo	10 March	(Brazil) Daniel Serra (Brazil) João Paulo de Oliveira	(Brazil) Daniel Serra (Brazil) João Paulo de Oliveira	(Brazil) Daniel Serra (Brazil) João Paulo de Oliveira	Eurofarma RC
2	R1	(Paraná (state)) Autódromo Internacional de Curitiba, Paraná	8 April	(Brazil) Rubens Barrichello	(Brazil) Felipe Fraga	(Brazil) Felipe Fraga	Cimed Chevrolet Racing
2	R2	(Paraná (state)) Autódromo Internacional de Curitiba, Paraná	8 April		(Brazil) Diego Nunes	(Brazil) Lucas Di Grassi	HERO Motorsport
3	R1	Velopark, Nova Santa Rita, Rio Grande do Sul	23 April	(Brazil) Cacá Bueno	(Brazil) Júlio Campos	(Brazil) Cacá Bueno	Cimed Chevrolet Racing
3	R2	Velopark, Nova Santa Rita, Rio Grande do Sul	23 April		(Brazil) Ricardo Zonta	(Brazil) Daniel Serra	Eurofarma RC
4	R1	(Paraná (state)) Autódromo Internacional Ayrton Senna (Londrina), Paraná	6 May	(Brazil) Rubens Barrichello	(Brazil) Max Wilson	(Brazil) Max Wilson	Eurofarma RC
4	R2	(Paraná (state)) Autódromo Internacional Ayrton Senna (Londrina), Paraná	6 May		(Brazil) Thiago Camilo	(Brazil) Lucas Di Grassi	HERO Motorsport
5	R1	Autódromo Internacional de Santa Cruz do Sul, Rio Grande do Sul	20 May	(Brazil) Marcos Gomes	(Brazil) Marcos Gomes	(Brazil) Marcos Gomes	Cimed Chevrolet Racing Team
5	R2	Autódromo Internacional de Santa Cruz do Sul, Rio Grande do Sul	20 May		(Brazil) Diego Nunes	(Brazil) Átila Abreu	Shell V-Power
6		10ª Corrida do Milhão Pirelli 2018, Autódromo Internacional Ayrton Senna (Goiânia)	5 August	(Brazil) Daniel Serra	(Portugal) António Félix da Costa	(Brazil) Rubens Barrichello	Full Time Sports
7	R1	Autódromo Internacional Orlando Moura, Mato Grosso do Sul	19 August	(Brazil) Daniel Serra	(Brazil) Cacá Bueno	(Brazil) Felipe Fraga	Cimed Chevrolet Racing
7	R2	Autódromo Internacional Orlando Moura, Mato Grosso do Sul	19 August		(Brazil) Antonio Pizzonia	(Brazil) Cacá Bueno	Cimed Chevrolet Racing
8	R1	(Paraná (state)) Autódromo Internacional de Cascavel, Paraná	9 September	(Brazil) Felipe Fraga	(Brazil) Lucas Di Grassi	(Brazil) Lucas Di Grassi	HERO Motorsport
8	R2	(Paraná (state)) Autódromo Internacional de Cascavel, Paraná	9 September		(Brazil) Thiago Camilo	(Brazil) Átila Abreu	Shell V-Power
9	R1	(São Paulo (state)) Autódromo Velo Città, São Paulo	23 September	(Brazil) Marcos Gomes	(Brazil) Marcos Gomes	(Brazil) Felipe Fraga	Cimed Chevrolet Racing
9	R2	(São Paulo (state)) Autódromo Velo Città, São Paulo	23 September		(Brazil) Marcos Gomes	(Brazil) Átila Abreu	Shell V-Power
10	R1	(Paraná (state)) Autódromo Internacional Ayrton Senna (Londrina), Paraná	21 October	(Brazil) Felipe Fraga	(Brazil) Rubens Barrichello	(Brazil) Rubens Barrichello	Full Time Sports
10	R2	(Paraná (state)) Autódromo Internacional Ayrton Senna (Londrina), Paraná	21 October		(Brazil) Diego Nunes	(Brazil) Átila Abreu	Shell V-Power
11	R1	(Goiás) Autódromo Internacional Ayrton Senna (Goiânia)	4 November	(Brazil) Daniel Serra	(Brazil) Ricardo Zonta	(Brazil) Diego Nunes	Full Time Bassani
11	R2	(Goiás) Autódromo Internacional Ayrton Senna (Goiânia)	4 November		(Brazil) Felipe Fraga	(Brazil) Max Wilson	Eurofarma RC
12		(São Paulo (state)) HERO Super Final 2018, Autódromo José Carlos Pace, São Paulo	9 December	(Brazil) Ricardo Zonta	(Brazil) Marcos Gomes	(Brazil) Ricardo Zonta	Shell V-Power

== Championship standings ==
Points system

Points are awarded for each race at an event to the driver/s of a car that completed at least 75% of the race distance and was running at the completion of the race.

Points format	Position														
Points format	1st	2nd	3rd	4th	5th	6th	7th	8th	9th	10th	11th	12th	13th	14th	15th
Feature races	30	26	22	19	17	15	13	11	9	7	5	4	3	2	1
First race/Sprint races	20	17	14	12	10	8	6	5	4	3	2	1	0		
Million race	35	30	25	21	18	15	13	11	9	7	5	4	3	2	1
Final race	60	52	44	38	34	30	26	22	18	14	10	8	6	4	2

- Feature races: Used for the first race of each event.
- First race/Sprint races: Used the first round with wildcards drivers and for the second race of each event, with partially reversed (top ten) grid .
- Million Race: Used for One Million dollars race.
- Final race: Used for the last round of the season with double points.

=== Drivers' Championship ===
Pos	Driver	INT	CUR		VEL		LON		SCZ		GOI	MS		CAS		VCA		LON		GOI		INT	Pts
1	(Brazil) Daniel Serra	**1**	2	10	8	1	3	3	2	5	**8**	**2**	DSQ	Ret	13	2	2	4	2	**3**	6	4	338
2	(Brazil) Felipe Fraga	Ret	1	Ret	4	5	5	Ret	14	3	4	1	Ret	**2**	7	1	6	**10**	**4**	2	3	5	310
3	(Brazil) Júlio Campos	24	4	Ret	3	3	8	Ret	4	9	Ret	13	Ret	4	2	5	5	2	14	7	9	2	252
4	(Brazil) Rubens Barrichello	2	**13**	4	Ret	9	**4**	2	Ret	6	1	9	7	7	14	11	3	1	10	5	Ret	6	242
5	(Brazil) Max Wilson	7	3	17	Ret	Ret	1	6	3	Ret	2	3	6	13	6	18	16	5	15	14	1	11	210
6	(Brazil) Átila Abreu	11	21	DNS	Ret	4	6	18	5	1	9	7	2	Ret	1	9	1	6	1	8	20	9	208
7	(Brazil) Marcos Gomes	7	9	Ret	9	2	2	Ret	**1**	4	5	11	Ret	3	11	**Ret**	11	8	9	12	Ret	7	202
8	(Brazil) Ricardo Zonta	4	20	8	2	7	13	11	13	13	6	12	DSQ	16	9	8	4	3	Ret	DSQ	Ret	**1**	184
9	(Brazil) Cacá Bueno	13	7	2	**1**	8	9	7	24	DNS	Ret	4	1	6	5	3	Ret	21	7	19	Ret	Ret	172
10	(Brazil) Gabriel Casagrande	Ret	4	3	7	12	14	12	15	Ret	DSQ	8	DSQ	5	DSQ	Ret	Ret	Ret	9	4	5	3	155
11	(Brazil) Thiago Camilo	Ret	Ret	9	11	6	10	4	16	2	Ret	6	DSQ	8	4	6	20	7	6	13	Ret	14	134
12	(Brazil) Lucas Di Grassi	Ret	6	1	Ret	DNS	7	1			21	Ret	Ret	1	Ret	5	Ret			Ret	4	24	127
13	(Brazil) César Ramos	3	8	Ret	Ret	19	Ret	Ret	7	7	DSQ	5	Ret	Ret	DNS	Ret	22	12	Ret	9	**Ret**	18	74
14	(Brazil) Diego Nunes	Ret	19	16	14	14	18	5	17	12	15	18	Ret	12	Ret	Ret	13	9	13	1	17	12	66
15	(Brazil) Nelson Piquet Jr.	Ret	15	18	19	Ret	19	16			DSQ	Ret	3	18	Ret	7	8	17	Ret	6	2	20	65
16	(Brazil) Rafael Suzuki	9	10	**6**	16	11	22	17	12	Ret	14	15	10	10	**3**	22	21	DSQ	Ret	11	10	25	61
17	(Brazil) Allam Khodair	8	14	20	10	**10**	Ret	10	8	16	7	Ret	8	Ret	DNS	13	12			Ret	8	16	60
18	(Brazil) Ricardo Maurício	4	16	Ret	5	Ret	12	Ret	25	Ret	Ret	14	Ret	20	15	12	18	Ret	3	22	12	23	54
19	(Brazil) Lucas Foresti	10	Ret	DSQ	6	17	20	15	6	Ret	13	16	Ret	9	17	14	17	Ret	20	17	18	15	49
20	(Brazil) Felipe Lapenna	Ret	Ret	12	Ret	Ret	17	Ret	9	**8**	Ret	Ret	4	11	18	10	**DNS**	Ret	21	10	Ret	Ret	46
21	(Brazil) Antonio Pizzonia	14	23	5	24	Ret	15	DSQ	Ret	11	Ret	Ret	Ret	15	8	Ret	24	13	Ret	Ret	14	8	44
22	(Brazil) Vitor Genz	23	Ret	7	13	Ret	11	13	23	Ret	11	10	11	19	11	21	23	19	8	21	7	Ret	43
23	(Brazil) Denis Navarro	20	11	15	12	Ret	Ret	Ret	10	Ret	20	20	Ret	14	Ret	Ret	14	11	Ret	24	16	19	23
24	(Brazil) Bia Figueiredo	Ret	Ret	Ret	22	16	Ret	14	21	Ret	10	17	5	Ret	Ret	17	Ret	16	11	Ret	15	17	21
26	(Brazil) Guga Lima	15	Ret	Ret	23	18	Ret	Ret	16	Ret	9	Ret	9	Ret	Ret	DNS	15	14	18	18	19	Ret	17
27	(Brazil) Bruno Baptista	Ret	12	14	17	13	21	Ret	22	DNS	18	Ret	Ret	21	16	15	9	15	16	16	Ret	13	16
28	(Brazil) Gaetano di Mauro																					10	14
28=	(Brazil) Valdeno Brito	16	DSQ	DNS	21	Ret	16	19	Ret	10	Ret	21	DSQ	Ret	Ret	19	7	18	12	15	11	26	13
28=	(Argentina) Esteban Guerrieri													17	10			20	5				13
30	(Brazil) Sérgio Jimenez	17	22	DNS	18	Ret	Ret	8	11	15													10
31	(Brazil) Tuka Rocha	19	Ret	11	15	DSQ	Ret	9	19	18													7
32	(Argentina) Agustín Canapino										12												5
33=	(Brazil) Guilherme Salas	10	18	DNS	Ret	Ret	Ret	Ret	Ret	17	16												4
33=	(Brazil) Galid Osman	21	19	17	20	15	Ret	Ret	Ret	Ret	Ret	Ret	12	Ret	DNS	20	10	DSQ	Ret	20	13	Ret	4
	(Brazil) Fabio Carbone		Ret	13																			0
	(Argentina) Nestor Girolami											18	13	Ret	Ret								0
	(Brazil) Ricardo Sperafico															16	19	DSQ	17	23	Ret	22	0
	(Brazil) Nonô Figueiredo								20	16													0
	(Brazil) Renato Braga										17												0
	(Brazil) Vítor Meira	18																					0
	(Brazil) Tarso Marques	22																					0
	(Brazil) Fernando Croce	22	Ret	Ret																			0
	(Brazil) William Starostik																					21	0
Drivers ineligible to score points (only at the first round)
—	(Brazil) João Paulo de Oliveira	**1**																					
—	(Portugal) Filipe Albuquerque	2																					
—	(South Africa) Kelvin van der Linde	3																Ret	19				
—	(Portugal) António Félix da Costa										3												
—	(Brazil) Felipe Nasr	4																					
—	(Belgium) Laurens Vanthoor	5																					
—	(Brazil) Felipe Giaffone	6																					
—	(Brazil) Pipo Derani	7																					
—	(Brazil) Alan Hellmeister	8																					
—	(France) Jean-Karl Vernay	9																					
—	(Argentina) Mariano Altuna	10																					
—	(Belgium) Jérôme d'Ambrosio	11																					
—	(Australia) Mark Winterbottom	12																					
—	(Brazil) Felipe Massa	13									22												
—	(United Kingdom) Oliver Jarvis	14																					
—	(Brazil) Gustavo Myasava	15																					
—	(Netherlands) Jeroen Bleekemolen	16																					
—	(Brazil) Fábio Carbone	17																					
	(Brazil) Vicente Orige	18																					
—	(Brazil) Raphael Matos	19																					
—	(Argentina) Franco Girolami	20																					
—	(Argentina) Damián Fineschi	21																					
—	(Brazil) Fernando Croce	22																					
—	(Brazil) David Muffato	23																					
—	(United Kingdom) Jamie Green	24																					
—	(Brazil) Gabriel Robe	Ret																					
—	(Brazil) Nonô Figueiredo	Ret																					
—	(Netherlands) Robin Frijns	Ret																					
—	(Brazil) Luciano Burti	Ret																					
—	(Switzerland) Nico Müller	Ret																					
—	(Brazil) Beto Monteiro	Ret																					
—	(Netherlands) Nick Catsburg	Ret																					
—	(New Zealand) Chris van der Drift	Ret																					
—	(Brazil) Augusto Farfus	Ret																					
Pos	Driver	INT	CUR		VEL		LON		SCZ		GOI	MS		CAS		VCA		LON		GOI		INT	Pts

Colour	Result
Gold	Winner
Silver	Second place
Bronze	Third place
Green	Points classification
Blue	Non-points classification
Blue	Non-classified finish (NC)
Purple	Retired, not classified (Ret)
Red	Did not qualify (DNQ)
Red	Did not pre-qualify (DNPQ)
Black	Disqualified (DSQ)
White	Did not start (DNS)
White	Withdrew (WD)
White	Race cancelled (C)
Blank	Did not practice (DNP)
Blank	Did not arrive (DNA)
Blank	Excluded (EX)

**Bold** – Pole position
Italics – Fastest lap
† – Retired, but classified
