= 2020 Stock Car Brasil Championship =

Car racing competition

Seasons
- ← 2019 2021 →

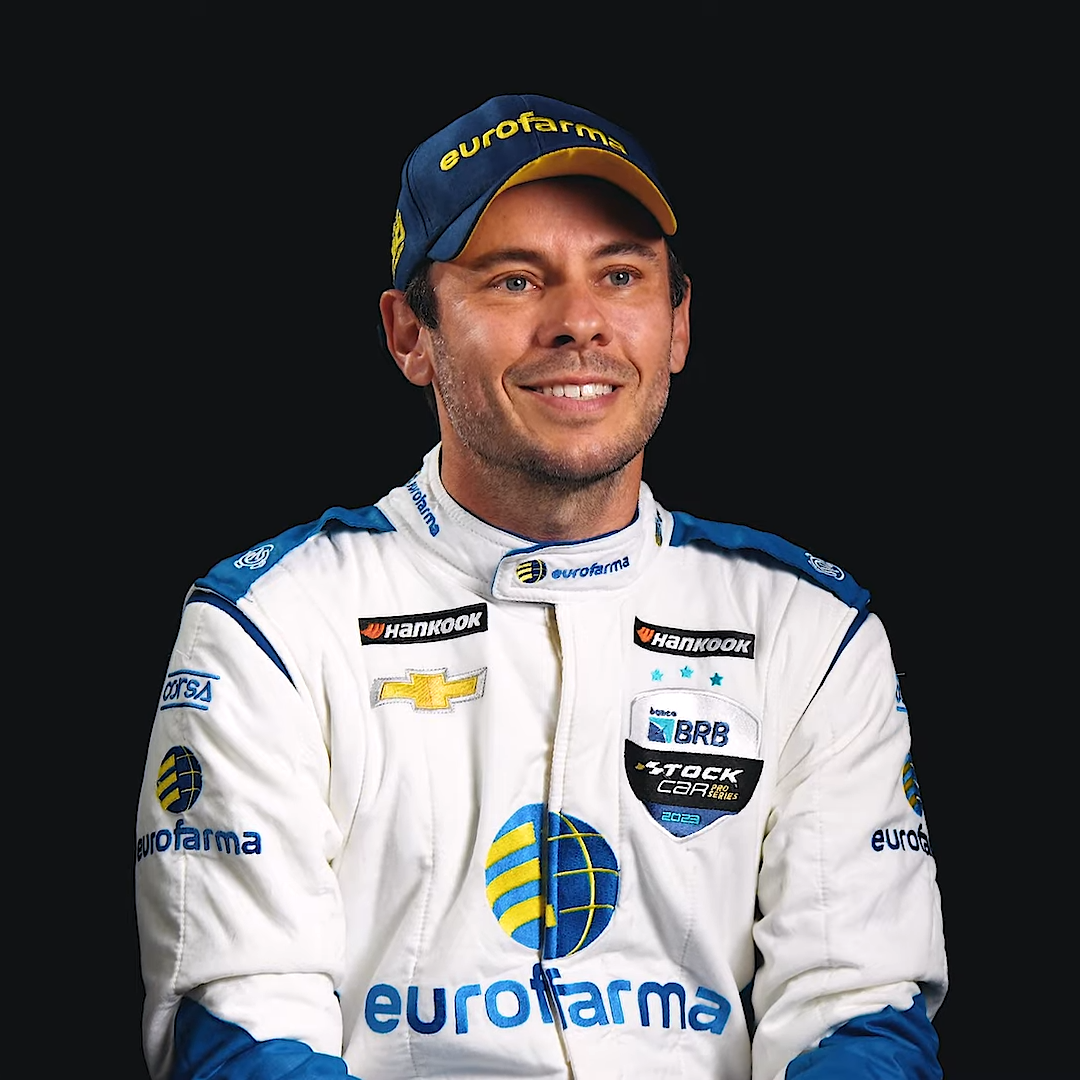
Ricardo Maurício won the 2020 championship

The 2020 Stock Car Brasil Championship was the forty-second season of the Stock Car Brasil, starting at Goiânia on 26 July and ending at Interlagos Circuit on 13 December. The season marked the entrance of Toyota Gazoo Racing in the series. The championship was won by Ricardo Maurício.

== Changes ==
=== Technical regulations ===
- For 2020 Toyota Gazoo Racing entered alongside Chevrolet. The make developed ten Toyota Corolla Stock Car.
- Chevrolet Cruze and Toyota Corolla models were used in the 2020 configuration. They were adapted to Stock Car components such as suspension, brake, gear and some other items of current cars.

== Teams and drivers ==
Team	Car	No.	Drivers	Rounds
Crown Racing	Chevrolet Cruze Stock Car	0	(Brazil) Cacá Bueno	All
Crown Racing	Chevrolet Cruze Stock Car	4	(Brazil) Júlio Campos	All
Shell V-Power	Chevrolet Cruze Stock Car	28	(Brazil) Galid Osman	All
Shell V-Power	Chevrolet Cruze Stock Car	51	(Brazil) Átila Abreu	All
Cavaleiro Sports	Chevrolet Cruze Stock Car	5	(Brazil) Denis Navarro	All
Cavaleiro Sports	Chevrolet Cruze Stock Car	80	(Brazil) Marcos Gomes	All
Full Time Bassani	Toyota Corolla Stock Car	8	(Brazil) Rafael Suzuki	All
Full Time Bassani	Toyota Corolla Stock Car	33	(Brazil) Nelson Piquet Jr.	All
Full Time Sports	Toyota Corolla Stock Car	111	(Brazil) Rubens Barrichello	All
Full Time Sports	Toyota Corolla Stock Car	117	(Argentina) Matías Rossi	All
RCM Motorsport	Toyota Corolla Stock Car	10	(Brazil) Ricardo Zonta	All
RCM Motorsport	Toyota Corolla Stock Car	44	(Brazil) Bruno Baptista	All
Vogel Motorsport	Chevrolet Cruze Stock Car	11	(Brazil) Gaetano di Mauro	1–7
Vogel Motorsport	Chevrolet Cruze Stock Car	12	(Brazil) Lucas Foresti	All
Vogel Motorsport	Chevrolet Cruze Stock Car	110	(Brazil) Felipe Lapenna	8–12
KTF Sports	Chevrolet Cruze Stock Car	11	(Brazil) Gaetano di Mauro	8–12
KTF Sports	Chevrolet Cruze Stock Car	46	(Brazil) Vitor Genz	1
KTF Sports	Chevrolet Cruze Stock Car	85	(Brazil) Guilherme Salas	All
KTF Sports	Chevrolet Cruze Stock Car	120	(Brazil) Vitor Baptista	2–3
Blau Motorsport	Chevrolet Cruze Stock Car	18	(Brazil) Allam Khodair	All
Blau Motorsport	Chevrolet Cruze Stock Car	70	(Brazil) Diego Nunes	All
Ipiranga Racing	Toyota Corolla Stock Car	21	(Brazil) Thiago Camilo	All
Ipiranga Racing	Toyota Corolla Stock Car	30	(Brazil) César Ramos	All
Eurofarma RC	Chevrolet Cruze Stock Car	29	(Brazil) Daniel Serra	All
Eurofarma RC	Chevrolet Cruze Stock Car	90	(Brazil) Ricardo Maurício	All
Hot Car Competições	Chevrolet Cruze Stock Car	54	(Brazil) Tuca Antoniazi	All
R.Mattheis Motorsport	Chevrolet Cruze Stock Car	83	(Brazil) Gabriel Casagrande	All
R.Mattheis Motorsport	Chevrolet Cruze Stock Car	143	(Brazil) Pedro Cardoso	All

=== Team changes ===
Cimed Racing announced the departure as a team of the championship after seven seasons and two titles. Customer team in 2019 Crown Racing will expand to four cars. The team also announced an alliance with Shell V-Power Racing that left TMG Racing. After the end of partnership, TMG announced a new partner with Blau Motorsport in 2020. The new team, which will be formed by the union of the two structures. After one year of partnership Full Time Sports and Shell broke up and FTS will take on four cars.

Prati-Donaduzzi breaks up with R.Mattheis Motorsport and leaves Stock Car. The team will return to the original name.

Hot Car Competições scaled back to a single car operations and Carlos Alves Competições, who competed part-time last season, will not return.

Toyota Gazoo Racing Brasil will compete with eight cars. The teams selected was Full Time Sports with four cars; RCM and Ipiranga Racing.

=== Drivers changes ===
Atila Abreu and Ricardo Zonta left TMG Racing and Galid Osman and Gaetano di Mauro left Full Time Sports. Abreu and Osman will be part of Crown Racing; Zonta joined RCM and Di Mauro entered Vogel.

Felipe Fraga left the series after six season and one title to focus on his international career. He will be part of Mercedes-Benz GT programme.

Gabriel Casagrande moved from Crown Racing to R. Mattheis. 2019 drivers Júlio Campos and Valdeno Brito didn't advertise 2020 plans. Later, Campos signed with Crown Racing for replaced Casagrande and Brito joined Copa Truck championship.

Argentine racing driver, Matias Rossi joined Toyota Full Time. Piquet Jr. was relocated to the customer team alongside Rafael Suzuki, who moved from Hot Car Competições.

== Race calendar and Results ==
The calendar suffered a lot of changes due to the COVID-19 pandemic.

#	Circuit	Date	Pole position	Fastest lap	Winning driver	Winning team	Car	Info
1	(Goiás) Autódromo Internacional Ayrton Senna, Goiânia	July 26	(Paraná (state)) Ricardo Zonta	(Paraná (state)) Ricardo Zonta	(Paraná (state)) Ricardo Zonta	(Brazil) RCM Motorsport	Toyota	
1	(Goiás) Autódromo Internacional Ayrton Senna, Goiânia	July 26	Without Dispute	(São Paulo (state)) Thiago Camilo	(São Paulo (state)) Rubens Barrichello	(Brazil) Full Time Sports	Toyota	
2	(São Paulo (state)) Autódromo José Carlos Pace, São Paulo	August 22	(Rio Grande do Sul) César Ramos	(Federal District (Brazil)) Nelson Piquet Jr.	(Federal District (Brazil)) Nelson Piquet Jr.	(Brazil) Full Time Bassani	Toyota	
3	(São Paulo (state)) Corrida do Milhão	August 23	(Rio Grande do Sul) César Ramos	(São Paulo (state)) Marcos Gomes	(Paraná (state)) Ricardo Zonta	(Brazil) RCM Motorsport	Toyota	
4	(Paraná (state)) Autódromo Internacional Ayrton Senna, Londrina	September 13	(São Paulo (state)) Thiago Camilo	(Maranhão) Rafael Suzuki	(Maranhão) Rafael Suzuki	(Brazil) Full Time Bassani	Toyota	
4	(Paraná (state)) Autódromo Internacional Ayrton Senna, Londrina	September 13	Without Dispute	(Federal District (Brazil)) Nelson Piquet Jr.	(São Paulo (state)) Ricardo Mauricio	(Brazil) Eurofarma RC	Chevrolet	
5	(Paraná (state)) Autódromo Internacional de Cascavel, Cascavel	October 3	(São Paulo (state)) Thiago Camilo	(São Paulo (state)) Daniel Serra	(São Paulo (state)) Thiago Camilo	(Brazil) Ipiranga Racing	Toyota	
6	(Paraná (state)) Autódromo Internacional de Cascavel, Cascavel	October 4	(São Paulo (state)) Bruno Baptista	(São Paulo (state)) Bruno Baptista	(São Paulo (state)) Bruno Baptista	(Brazil) RCM Motorsport	Toyota	
6	(Paraná (state)) Autódromo Internacional de Cascavel, Cascavel	October 4	Without Dispute	(Paraná (state)) Ricardo Zonta	(São Paulo (state)) Daniel Serra	(Brazil) Eurofarma RC	Chevrolet	
7	(São Paulo (state)) Autódromo Velo Città	October 18	(Paraná (state)) Julio Campos	(Federal District (Brazil)) Nelson Piquet Jr.	(Paraná (state)) Julio Campos	(Brazil) ACDelco/iCarros-Petrobrás Crown Racing	Chevrolet	
7	(São Paulo (state)) Autódromo Velo Città	October 18	Without Dispute	(São Paulo (state)) Ricardo Mauricio	(São Paulo (state)) Diego Nunes	(Brazil) TMG/Blau Motorsport	Chevrolet	
8	(Paraná (state)) Autódromo Internacional de Curitiba, Curitiba	November 7	(São Paulo (state)) Thiago Camilo	(São Paulo (state)) Thiago Camilo	(São Paulo (state)) Thiago Camilo	(Brazil) Ipiranga Racing	Toyota	
9	(Paraná (state)) Autódromo Internacional de Curitiba, Curitiba	November 8	(São Paulo (state)) Thiago Camilo	(São Paulo (state)) Thiago Camilo	(São Paulo (state)) Thiago Camilo	(Brazil) Ipiranga Racing	Toyota	
9	(Paraná (state)) Autódromo Internacional de Curitiba, Curitiba	November 8	Without Dispute	(Paraná (state)) Gabriel Casagrande	(Paraná (state)) Gabriel Casagrande	(Brazil) R. Mattheis	Chevrolet	
10	(Goiás) Autódromo Internacional Ayrton Senna, Goiânia	November 21	(São Paulo (state)) Guilherme Salas	(São Paulo (state)) Daniel Serra	(São Paulo (state)) Ricardo Mauricio	(Brazil) Eurofarma RC	Chevrolet	
11	(Goiás) Autódromo Internacional Ayrton Senna, Goiânia	November 22	(São Paulo (state)) Allam Khodair	(São Paulo (state)) Guilherme Salas	(São Paulo (state)) Guilherme Salas	(Brazil) KTF Sports	Chevrolet	
11	(Goiás) Autódromo Internacional Ayrton Senna, Goiânia	November 22	Without Dispute	(São Paulo (state)) Allam Khodair	(São Paulo (state)) Allam Khodair	(Brazil) TMG/Blau Motorsport	Chevrolet	
12	(São Paulo (state)) Grande Final, Autódromo José Carlos Pace, São Paulo	December 13	(São Paulo (state)) Ricardo Mauricio	(Paraná (state)) Ricardo Zonta	(São Paulo (state)) Ricardo Mauricio	(Brazil) Eurofarma RC	Chevrolet	

== Championship standings ==
Points system

Points are awarded for each race at an event to the driver/s of a car that completed at least 75% of the race distance and was running at the completion of the race.

Points format	Position																			
Points format	1st	2nd	3rd	4th	5th	6th	7th	8th	9th	10th	11th	12th	13th	14th	15th	16th	17th	18th	19th	20th
Feature races	30	26	22	19	17	15	14	13	12	11	10	9	8	7	6	5	4	3	2	1
Sprint races	24	20	18	17	16	15	14	13	12	11	10	9	8	7	6	5	4	3	2	1
Final race	60	52	44	38	34	30	28	26	24	22	20	18	16	14	12	10	8	6	4	2

- **Feature races** Used for the first race of each event.
- Sprint races:The second race of each event, with partially reversed (top ten) grid.
- Final race: Used for the last round of the season with double points.

=== Drivers' Championship ===
Pos	Driver	(Brazil) GOI		(Brazil) INT	(Brazil) CDM	(Brazil) LON		(Brazil) CAS	(Brazil) CAS		(Brazil) MOG		(Brazil) CUR	(Brazil) CUR		(Brazil) GOI	(Brazil) GOI		(Brazil) SPO	Pts
1	(Brazil) Ricardo Mauricio	3	13	5	5	10	1	4	19	11	15	3	10	8	6	1	18	5	1	291
2	(Brazil) Ricardo Zonta	1	Ret	3	1	11	13	9	Ret	2	12	4	12	6	5	Ret	5	10	2	278
3	(Brazil) Daniel Serra	4	6	13	NL	16	10	2	10	1	9	Ret	3	4	3	3	8	4	4	275
4	(Brazil) Thiago Camilo	6	5	Ret	6	3	11	1	5	16	16	8	1	1	7	10	Ret	11	Ret	238
5	(Brazil) César Ramos	8	8	2	2	4	Ret	5	4	8	4	14	13	16	18	13	15	12	5	237
6	(Brazil) Rubens Barrichello	7	1	7	4	7	2	7	14	21	14	5	8	5	4	9	9	3	16	234
7	(Brazil) Nelson Piquet Jr.	Ret	2	1	Ret	6	3	Ret	Ret	5	7	16	16	15	2	18	13	2	3	224
8	(Brazil) Gabriel Casagrande	Ret	Ret	6	Ret	2	4	Ret	6	3	2	7	14	10	1	5	4	8	WD	224
9	(Brazil) Allam Khodair	2	Ret	9	9	8	16	3	11	18	3	15	7	9	Ret	7	Ret	1	8	221
10	(Brazil) Guilherme Salas	13	11	Ret	7	Ret	Ret	15	9	15	6	11	2	2	Ret	2	1	Ret	10	212
11	(Brazil) Diego Nunes	14	15	14	Ret	12	15	16	2	Ret	10	1	5	12	9	4	2	Ret	12	203
12	(Brazil) Bruno Baptista	Ret	3	10	11	17	5	20	1	Ret	Ret	6	6	Ret	Ret	6	17	9	7	179
13	(Brazil) Júlio Campos	12	18	18	10	9	14	Ret	3	17	1	Ret	9	7	8	14	10	14	14	175
14	(Brazil) Rafael Suzuki	Ret	7	4	13	1	Ret	8	17	6	17	10	18	14	17	15	11	16	11	172
15	(Brazil) Átila Abreu	16	4	12	8	5	7	6	7	9	Ret	9	Ret	Ret	15	16	Ret	15	13	158
16	(Brazil) Denis Navarro	Ret	10	19	3	14	Ret	13	8	7	Ret	Ret	Ret	3	Ret	11	3	Ret	Ret	134
17	(Brazil) Cacá Bueno	5	9	16	Ret	13	8	Ret	18	13	11	18	11	11	16	Ret	Ret	17	15	125
18	(Argentina) Matías Rossi	11	12	Ret	Ret	Ret	12	10	Ret	10	8	2	4	Ret	11	12	16	Ret	Ret	121
19	(Brazil) Galid Osman	9	14	15	15	20	Ret	11	12	16	19	12	Ret	Ret	12	Ret	Ret	Ret	6	107
20	(Brazil) Gaetano di Mauro	Ret	Ret	8	16	21	6	19	Ret	4	Ret	Ret	Ret	17	Ret	8	6	Ret	9	104
21	(Brazil) Marcos Gomes	Ret	Ret	Ret	12	Ret	Ret	14	13	19	5	17	17	Ret	14	Ret	12	6	19	88
22	(Brazil) Lucas Foresti	15	Ret	11	14	15	18	17	12	14	13	13	Ret	Ret	10	Ret	NL	13	Ret	87
23	(Brazil) Pedro Cardoso	17	16	Ret	Ret	18	9	12	Ret	Ret	18	Ret	15	13	19	17	19	7	17	84
24	(Brazil) Tuca Antoniazi	18	17	20	Ret	19	17	18	15	20	20	19	Ret	18	Ret	19	14	18	18	50
25	(Brazil) Felipe Lapenna												Ret	Ret	13	NL	7	Ret	Ret	14
26	(Brazil) Vitor Genz	10	Ret																	11
27	(Brazil) Vitor Baptista			17	17															8
Pos	Piloto	(Brazil) GOI		(Brazil) INT	(Brazil) CDM	(Brazil) LON		(Brazil) CAS	(Brazil) CAS		(Brazil) MOG		(Brazil) CUR	(Brazil) CUR		(Brazil) GOI	(Brazil) GOI		(Brazil) SPO	Pts

Colour	Result
Gold	Winner
Silver	Second place
Bronze	Third place
Green	Points classification
Blue	Non-points classification
Blue	Non-classified finish (NC)
Purple	Retired, not classified (Ret)
Red	Did not qualify (DNQ)
Red	Did not pre-qualify (DNPQ)
Black	Disqualified (DSQ)
White	Did not start (DNS)
White	Withdrew (WD)
White	Race cancelled (C)
Blank	Did not practice (DNP)
Blank	Did not arrive (DNA)
Blank	Excluded (EX)

**Bold** – Pole position
Italics – Fastest lap
† – Retired, but classified
