= 2012 Stock Car Corrida do Milhão =

Autódromo José Carlos Pace

The 2012 Stock Car Corrida do Milhão (Stock Car Million Race) was the fourth edition of Stock Car Corrida do Milhão and was the last round of the 2012 Stock Car Brasil season held over the 7–9 December at the Autódromo José Carlos Pace in São Paulo, Brazil. 2012 edition had Formula 1 and IndyCar Series drivers Rubens Barrichello, Tony Kanaan, Hélio Castroneves and Raphael Matos as guest drivers. The race was won by Thiago Camilo and Cacá Bueno won the 2012 Stock Car Brasil championship.

== Teams and drivers ==
Manufacturer	Team	No.	Driver
Chevrolet	Red Bull Racing	0	(Brazil) Cacá Bueno
Chevrolet	Red Bull Racing	29	(Brazil) Daniel Serra
Chevrolet	Vogel Motorsport	5	(Brazil) Denis Navarro
Chevrolet	Vogel Motorsport	18	(Brazil) Allam Khodair
Chevrolet	Officer ProGP	6	(Brazil) Vítor Meira
Chevrolet	Officer ProGP	23	(Brazil) Duda Pamplona
Chevrolet	Linea Sucralose	10	(Brazil) Ricardo Zonta
Chevrolet	Linea Sucralose	74	(Brazil) Popó Bueno
Chevrolet	Mobil Super Pioneer Racing	11	(Brazil) Nonô Figueiredo
Chevrolet	Mobil Super Pioneer Racing	51	(Brazil) Átila Abreu
Chevrolet	Hot Car Competições	16	(Brazil) Diego Nunes
Chevrolet	Hot Car Competições	37	(Brazil) Eduardo Leite
Chevrolet	RCM Motorsport	21	(Brazil) Thiago Camilo
Chevrolet	RCM Motorsport	63	(Brazil) Lico Kaesemodel
Chevrolet	BMC Racing	25	(Brazil) Tuka Rocha
Chevrolet	BMC Racing	28	(Brazil) Galid Osman
Chevrolet	Eurofarma RC	65	(Brazil) Max Wilson
Chevrolet	Eurofarma RC	90	(Brazil) Ricardo Maurício
Peugeot	Comprafacil Nascar JF	1	(Brazil) Antônio Pizzonia
Peugeot	Comprafacil Nascar JF	88	(Brazil) Pedro Boesel
Peugeot	Bassani Racing	2	(Brazil) Raphael Matos
Peugeot	Bassani Racing	100	(Brazil) Tony Kanaan
Peugeot	Shell Racing	3	(Brazil) Hélio Castroneves
Peugeot	Shell Racing	77	(Brazil) Valdeno Brito
Peugeot	Carlos Alves Competições	4	(Brazil) Júlio Campos
Peugeot	Carlos Alves Competições	72	(Brazil) Fábio Fogaça
Peugeot	Itaipava Racing Team	14	(Brazil) Luciano Burti
Peugeot	Itaipava Racing Team	35	(Brazil) David Muffato
Peugeot	Medley Full Time	17	(Brazil) Rubens Barrichello
Peugeot	Medley Full Time	99	(Brazil) Xandinho Negrão
Peugeot	Prati-Donaduzzi Racing	19	(Brazil) Rodrigo Sperafico
Peugeot	Prati-Donaduzzi Racing	20	(Brazil) Ricardo Sperafico

== Classification ==
=== Qualifying ===
Pos	No.	Driver	Manufacturer	Team	Part 1	Part 2	Grid
1	0	(Brazil) Cacá Bueno	Chevrolet	Red Bull Racing	1:42.457	1:42.609	1
2	18	(Brazil) Allam Khodair	Chevrolet	Vogel Motorsport	1:42.494	1:42.640	2
3	74	(Brazil) Popó Bueno	Chevrolet	Linea Sucralose	1:42.499	1:42.717	3
4	90	(Brazil) Ricardo Maurício	Chevrolet	Eurofarma RC	1:42.483	1:42.768	4
5	29	(Brazil) Daniel Serra	Chevrolet	Red Bull Racing	1:42.386	1:42.823	5
6	10	(Brazil) Ricardo Zonta	Chevrolet	Linea Sucralose	1:42.639	1:42.866	21^{1}
7	77	(Brazil) Valdeno Brito	Peugeot	Shell Racing	1:42.324	1:42.887	6
8	17	(Brazil) Rubens Barrichello	Peugeot	Medley Full Time	1:42.508	1:43.179	7
9	19	(Brazil) Rodrigo Sperafico	Peugeot	Prati-Donaduzzi Racing	1:42.424	1:43.469	8
10	25	(Brazil) Tuka Rocha	Chevrolet	BMC Racing	1:42.504	1:43.652	9
11	51	(Brazil) Átila Abreu	Chevrolet	Mobil Super Pioneer Racing	1:42.688		10
12	28	(Brazil) Galid Osman	Chevrolet	BMC Racing	1:42.708		11
13	20	(Brazil) Ricardo Sperafico	Peugeot	Prati-Donaduzzi Racing	1:42.731		12
14	20	(Brazil) Denis Navarro	Chevrolet	Vogel Motorsport	1:42.889		13
15	6	(Brazil) Vítor Meira	Chevrolet	Officer ProGP	1:42.968		14
16	14	(Brazil) Luciano Burti	Peugeot	Itaipava Racing Team	1:43.060		15
17	11	(Brazil) Nonô Figueiredo	Chevrolet	Mobil Super Pioneer Racing	1:43.091		16
18	1	(Brazil) Antônio Pizzonia	Peugeot	Comprafacil Nascar JF	1:43.096		17
19	16	(Brazil) Diego Nunes	Chevrolet	Hot Car Competições	1:43.109		18
20	35	(Brazil) David Muffato	Peugeot	Itaipava Racing Team	1:43.118		19
21	21	(Brazil) Thiago Camilo	Chevrolet	RCM Motorsport	1:43.165		20
22	4	(Brazil) Júlio Campos	Peugeot	Carlos Alves Competições	1:43.206		32^{1}
23	3	(Brazil) Hélio Castroneves	Peugeot	Shell Racing	1:43.226		22
24	2	(Brazil) Raphael Matos	Peugeot	Bassani Racing	1:43.257		23
25	65	(Brazil) Max Wilson	Chevrolet	Eurofarma RC	1:43.273		24
26	99	(Brazil) Xandinho Negrão	Peugeot	Medley Full Time	1:43.296		25
27	100	(Brazil) Tony Kanaan	Peugeot	Bassani Racing	1:43.390		26
28	63	(Brazil) Lico Kaesemodel	Chevrolet	RCM Motorsport	1:43.535		27
29	16	(Brazil) Eduardo Leite	Chevrolet	Hot Car Competições	1:43.553		28
30	23	(Brazil) Duda Pamplona	Chevrolet	Officer ProGP	1:43.678		29
31	88	(Brazil) Pedro Boesel	Peugeot	Comprafacil Nascar JF	1:44.118		30
32	72	(Brazil) Fábio Fogaça	Peugeot	Carlos Alves Competições	1:44.196		31

Notes

- ^1 — Ricardo Zonta and Júlio Campos received a fifteen-place grid penalty for causing a collision at eleventh round in Curitiba.

=== Race ===
Pos	No	Driver	Manufacturer	Team	Laps	Time/Retired	Grid
1	21	(Brazil) Thiago Camilo	Chevrolet	RCM Motorsport	27	52:08.475	20
2	90	(Brazil) Ricardo Maurício	Chevrolet	Eurofarma RC	27	+0.081	4
3	0	(Brazil) Cacá Bueno	Chevrolet	Red Bull Racing	27	+0.564	1
4	4	(Brazil) Júlio Campos	Peugeot	Carlos Alves Competições	27	+2.395	32
5	10	(Brazil) Ricardo Zonta	Chevrolet	Linea Sucralose	27	+2.635	21
6	23	(Brazil) Duda Pamplona	Chevrolet	Officer ProGP	27	+5.114	29
7	20	(Brazil) Denis Navarro	Chevrolet	Vogel Motorsport	27	+7.747	13
8	51	(Brazil) Átila Abreu	Chevrolet	Mobil Super Pioneer Racing	27	+8.081	10
9	2	(Brazil) Raphael Matos	Peugeot	Bassani Racing	27	+12.792	23
10	1	(Brazil) Antônio Pizzonia	Peugeot	Comprafacil Nascar JF	27	+14.140	17
11	74	(Brazil) Popó Bueno	Chevrolet	Linea Sucralose	27	+16.531	3
12	29	(Brazil) Daniel Serra	Chevrolet	Red Bull Racing	27	+17.156	5
13	19	(Brazil) Rodrigo Sperafico	Peugeot	Prati-Donaduzzi Racing	27	+17.563	8
14	3	(Brazil) Hélio Castroneves	Peugeot	Shell Racing	27	+18.669	22
15	14	(Brazil) Luciano Burti	Peugeot	Itaipava Racing Team	27	+19.589	15
16	88	(Brazil) Pedro Boesel	Peugeot	Comprafacil Nascar JF	27	+21.654	30
17	20	(Brazil) Ricardo Sperafico	Peugeot	Prati-Donaduzzi Racing	27	+25.781	12
18	25	(Brazil) Tuka Rocha	Chevrolet	BMC Racing	27	+26.482	9
19	16	(Brazil) Eduardo Leite	Chevrolet	Hot Car Competições	27	+31.742	28
20	18	(Brazil) Allam Khodair	Chevrolet	Vogel Motorsport	27	+32.830	2
21	35	(Brazil) David Muffato	Peugeot	Itaipava Racing Team	27	+33.268	19
22	17	(Brazil) Rubens Barrichello	Peugeot	Medley Full Time	27	+34.560	7
23	72	(Brazil) Fábio Fogaça	Peugeot	Carlos Alves Competições	27	+1:11.701	31
24	99	(Brazil) Xandinho Negrão	Peugeot	Medley Full Time	27	+1:21.125	25
25	11	(Brazil) Nonô Figueiredo	Chevrolet	Mobil Super Pioneer Racing	26	+1 Lap	16
26	28	(Brazil) Galid Osman	Chevrolet	BMC Racing	26	+1 Lap	11
27	77	(Brazil) Valdeno Brito	Peugeot	Shell Racing	26	+1 Lap	6
28	6	(Brazil) Vítor Meira	Chevrolet	Officer ProGP	26	+1 Lap	14
29	65	(Brazil) Max Wilson	Chevrolet	Eurofarma RC	24	+3 Laps	24
Ret	16	(Brazil) Diego Nunes	Chevrolet	Hot Car Competições	13	Retired	18
Ret	100	(Brazil) Tony Kanaan	Peugeot	Bassani Racing	8	Retired	26
Ret	63	(Brazil) Lico Kaesemodel	Chevrolet	RCM Motorsport	1	Retired	27
Fastest lap: Allam Khodair, 1:43.352, 150.27 km/h (93.37 mph) on lap 5
