= Team RC =

Brazilian motor racing team, based in Curitiba

(Brazil) RC Competições
- Founded: 2000; 26 years ago
- Base: Curitiba, Paraná, Brazil
- Team principal(s): Rosinei Campos
- Current series: Stock Car Pro Series; Império Endurance Brasil
- Current drivers: Eurofarma RC (Brazil) Ricardo Maurício (Brazil) Daniel Serra; RCM Motorsport (Brazil) Bruno Baptista (Brazil) Ricardo Zonta
- Noted drivers: (Brazil) Daniel Serra (Brazil) Ricardo Mauricio (Brazil) Max Wilson (Brazil) Giuliano Losacco (Brazil) Caca Bueno
- Drivers' Championships: 9 (2006 Stock Car Brasil season, 2007 Stock Car Brasil season, 2010 Stock Car Brasil season, 2017 Stock Car Brasil season, 2018 Stock Car Brasil season, 2019 Stock Car Brasil Championship, 2020 Stock Car Brasil Championship)
- Website: http://www.rccompeticoes.com/

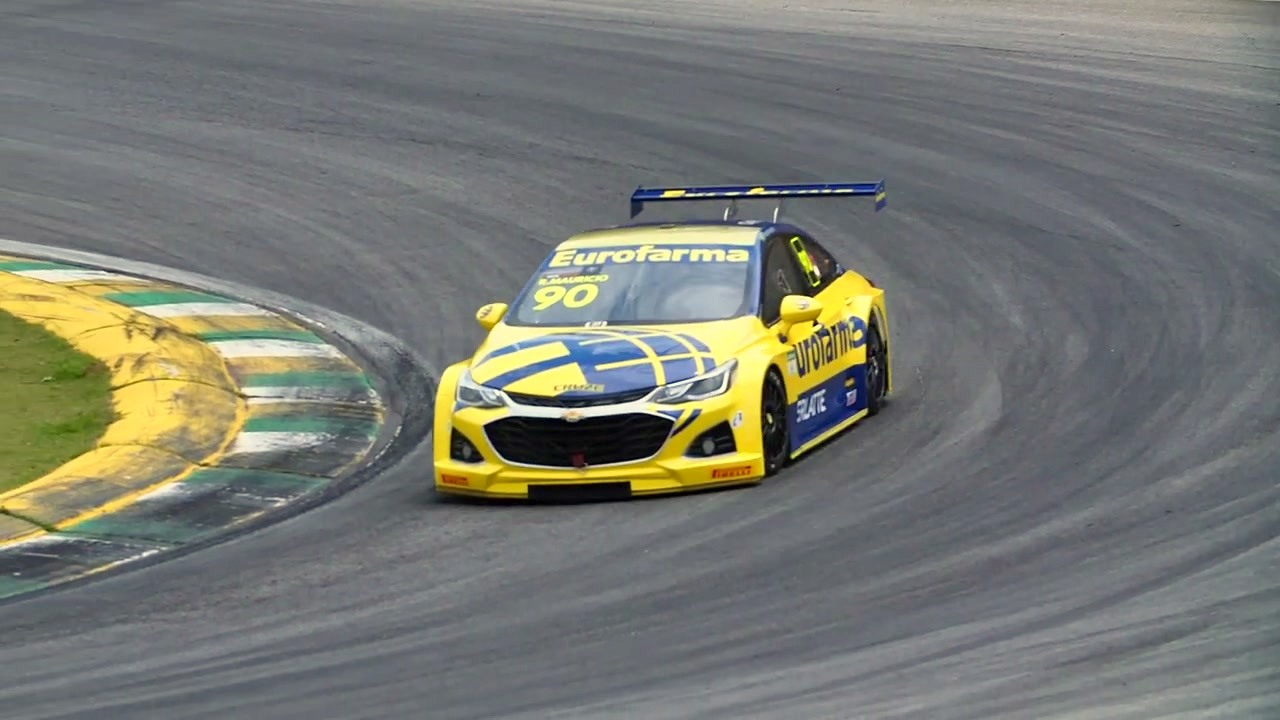
Ricardo Maurício driving the Eurofarma sponsored RC Competições Chevrolet Cruze

RC Competições / Team RC, currently competing as Eurofarma RC, is a Brazilian auto racing team owned by Rosinei Campos and based in Curitiba, Paraná. It currently competes in the Stock Car Pro Series and Império Endurance Brasil.

RC Competições is the most successful team in Stock Car Brasil, being won the driver's championship nine times: in 2004 with Giuliano Losacco, 2006 and 2007 with Cacá Bueno, 2010 with Max Wilson, in 2013 and 2020 with Ricardo Maurício, and in 2017, 2018 and 2019 with Daniel Serra. in 2020 by Ricardo Maurício.

The team has 3 victories in the Corrida do Milhão, one of the most important races in the championship. It currently has Ricardo Mauricio and Daniel Serra as drivers, both from São Paulo, using the Chevrolet Cruze model. Drivers such as Luciano Burti, Antonio Jorge Neto, the vice-champion in 2006, Enrique Bernoldi, Raul Boesel, Lucas Di Grassi, Nonô Figueiredo, Thiago Camilo, among many others, passed through the team.

== Current series results ==
=== Stock Car Pro Series ===
Year	Chassis	Tyres	Drivers	Races	Wins	Poles	F. Laps	Podiums	D.C.	Pts	T.C.	Pts
2019	Chevrolet Cruze Stock Car	P	(Brazil) Daniel Serra	20	1	0	2	9	1st	387	N/A	707
2019	Chevrolet Cruze Stock Car	P	(Brazil) Ricardo Maurício	20	3	1	1	7	3rd	320	N/A	707
2020	Chevrolet Cruze Stock Car	P	(Brazil) Daniel Serra	18	1	0	0	5	3rd	275	N/A	566
2020	Chevrolet Cruze Stock Car	P	(Brazil) Ricardo Maurício	18	3	0	0	4	1st	291	N/A	566
2021	Chevrolet Cruze Stock Car	P	(Brazil) Daniel Serra	24	1	0	4	5	2nd	354	N/A	658
2021	Chevrolet Cruze Stock Car	P	(Brazil) Ricardo Maurício	24	7	2	4	7	5th	304	N/A	658
2022	Chevrolet Cruze Stock Car	P	(Brazil) Daniel Serra	23	1	1	1	5	2nd	316	N/A	573
2022	Chevrolet Cruze Stock Car	P	(Brazil) Ricardo Maurício	23	5	2	4	8	6th	257	N/A	573
