= 2014 Formula 4 Sudamericana season =

The 2014 Formula 4 Sudamericana season was the inaugural season of the Formula 4 Sudamericana. It began on 6 April in Polideportivo Ciudad de Mercedes and finished on 14 December in Autódromo Ciudad de Concordia after seven rounds.

== Drivers ==
No.	Driver	Rounds
3	(Argentina) Miguel Calamari	4
4	(Uruguay) Miguel Wohler	3
9	(Uruguay) Francisco Cammarota	1, 4–7
10	(Uruguay) Mauro Marino	1–2
11	(Argentina) Agustín Lima Capitao	5–7
13	(Brazil) Rodrigo Baptista	6
17	(Brazil) Andre Vollmer	7
25	(Brazil) Bruno Baptista	All
27	(Mexico) Maximiliano González	4
30	(Chile) Max Soto	7
33	(Uruguay) Nicolás Muraglia	2–7
34	(Uruguay) Frederick Balbi	1–2
35	(Brazil) Felipe Ortiz	All
37	(Uruguay) Adrián Chiribao	4–5
42	(Mexico) Salvador de Alba	4
55	(Uruguay) Federico Ensslin	1, 3
58	(Argentina) Martín Ponte	3
60	(Uruguay) Juan Manuel Casella	2, 4
69	(Uruguay) Diego Muraglia	2, 4–5, 7
85	(Brazil) Enzo Bortoleto	1–2
95	(Brazil) Lucas Kohl	6
99	(Argentina) Alessandro Salerno	1

== Race calendar and results ==
Round		Circuit	Date	Pole position	Fastest lap	Winning driver
1	R1	(Uruguay) Polideportivo Ciudad de Mercedes, Soriano	6 April	(Brazil) Enzo Bortoleto	(Uruguay) Frederick Balbi	(Uruguay) Frederick Balbi
1	R2	(Uruguay) Polideportivo Ciudad de Mercedes, Soriano	6 April		(Brazil) Bruno Baptista	(Brazil) Felipe Ortiz
2	R1	(Uruguay) Autódromo Víctor Borrat Fabini, El Pinar (No. 2 layout)	4 May	(Brazil) Felipe Ortiz	(Uruguay) Juan Manuel Casella	(Brazil) Felipe Ortiz
2	R2	(Uruguay) Autódromo Víctor Borrat Fabini, El Pinar (No. 2 layout)	4 May		(Uruguay) Juan Manuel Casella	(Uruguay) Juan Manuel Casella
3	R1	(Uruguay) Autódromo Víctor Borrat Fabini, El Pinar (No. 7 layout)	17 August	(Argentina) Martín Ponte	(Uruguay) Miguel Wohler	(Argentina) Martín Ponte
3	R2	(Uruguay) Autódromo Víctor Borrat Fabini, El Pinar (No. 7 layout)	17 August		(Uruguay) Miguel Wohler	(Argentina) Martín Ponte
4	R1	(Uruguay) Autódromo Víctor Borrat Fabini, El Pinar (No. 5 layout)	14 September	(Uruguay) Francisco Cammarota	(Uruguay) Juan Manuel Casella	(Uruguay) Juan Manuel Casella
4	R2	(Uruguay) Autódromo Víctor Borrat Fabini, El Pinar (No. 5 layout)	14 September		(Brazil) Bruno Baptista	(Brazil) Bruno Baptista
5	R1	(Uruguay) Polideportivo Ciudad de Mercedes, Soriano	28 September	(Brazil) Bruno Baptista	(Brazil) Bruno Baptista	(Brazil) Bruno Baptista
5	R2	(Uruguay) Polideportivo Ciudad de Mercedes, Soriano	28 September		(Brazil) Felipe Ortiz	(Brazil) Bruno Baptista
5	R3	(Uruguay) Polideportivo Ciudad de Mercedes, Soriano	28 September		(Brazil) Bruno Baptista	(Uruguay) Francisco Cammarota
5	R4	(Uruguay) Polideportivo Ciudad de Mercedes, Soriano	28 September		(Uruguay) Francisco Cammarota	(Uruguay) Francisco Cammarota
6	R1	(Brazil) Autódromo Internacional de Tarumã, Viamão	23 November	(Argentina) Agustín Lima Capitao	(Argentina) Agustín Lima Capitao	(Argentina) Agustín Lima Capitao
6	R2	(Brazil) Autódromo Internacional de Tarumã, Viamão	23 November		(Argentina) Agustín Lima Capitao	(Argentina) Agustín Lima Capitao
6	R3	(Brazil) Autódromo Internacional de Tarumã, Viamão	23 November		(Argentina) Agustín Lima Capitao	(Argentina) Agustín Lima Capitao
7	R1	(Argentina) Autódromo Ciudad de Concordia, Concordia	14 December	(Argentina) Agustín Lima Capitao	(Argentina) Agustín Lima Capitao	(Argentina) Agustín Lima Capitao
7	R2	(Argentina) Autódromo Ciudad de Concordia, Concordia	14 December		(Brazil) Bruno Baptista	(Brazil) Bruno Baptista

== Championship standings ==
Points system

- Points were awarded as follows:

Position	1	2	3	4	5	6	7	8	9	10	R1 PP	FL
Points	25	18	15	12	10	8	6	4	2	1	1	1

=== Formula 4 Sudamericana ===
The championship was won by Brazilian driver Bruno Baptista, who was just one of two drivers, who competed in the series on the full-time basis.

Pos	Driver	MRC1 (Uruguay)		ELP1 (Uruguay)		ELP2 (Uruguay)		ELP3 (Uruguay)		MRC2 (Uruguay)				TAR (Brazil)			CON‡ (Argentina)		Pts
1	(Brazil) Bruno Baptista	2	2	2	2	3	2	Ret	1	**1**	1	2	2	6	2	2	2	1	352
2	(Brazil) Felipe Ortiz	3	1	**1**	Ret	4	3	2	5	2	4	3	DSQ	3	5	4	4	2	264
3	(Argentina) Agustín Lima Capitao									3	2	5	Ret	**1**	1	1	**1**	4	198
4	(Uruguay) Francisco Cammarota	8	5					**Ret**	3	4	3	1	1	2	4	6	3	7	188
5	(Uruguay) Nicolás Muraglia			7	4	6	5	3	8	7	7	6	4	4	3	7	7	6	148
6	(Uruguay) Diego Muraglia			8	3			4	9	5	5	4	Ret				5	3	115
7	(Uruguay) Juan Manuel Casella			4	1			1	2										83
8	(Argentina) Martín Ponte					**1**	1												51
9	(Uruguay) Adrián Chiribao							7	6	6	6	7	3						51
10	(Uruguay) Federico Ensslin	4	4			5	4												46
11	(Uruguay) Frederick Balbi	1	6	5	Ret														45
12	(Brazil) Enzo Bortoleto	**5**	3	3	Ret														41
13	(Uruguay) Miguel Wohler					2	6												28
14	(Brazil) Andre Vollmer																8	5	28
15	(Brazil) Lucas Kohl													5	7	5			26
16	(Brazil) Rodrigo Baptista													Ret	6	3			23
17	(Uruguay) Mauro Marino	7	8	6	Ret														18
18	(Chile) Max Soto																6	Ret	16
19	(Argentina) Alessandro Salerno	6	7																14
20	(Mexico) Maximiliano González							6	7										14
21	(Mexico) Salvador de Alba							Ret	4										12
22	(Argentina) Miguel Calamari							5	Ret										10
Pos	Driver	MRC1 (Uruguay)		ELP1 (Uruguay)		ELP2 (Uruguay)		ELP3 (Uruguay)		MRC2 (Uruguay)				TAR (Brazil)			CON (Argentina)		Pts

Colour	Result
Gold	Winner
Silver	Second place
Bronze	Third place
Green	Points classification
Blue	Non-points classification
Blue	Non-classified finish (NC)
Purple	Retired, not classified (Ret)
Red	Did not qualify (DNQ)
Red	Did not pre-qualify (DNPQ)
Black	Disqualified (DSQ)
White	Did not start (DNS)
White	Withdrew (WD)
White	Race cancelled (C)
Blank	Did not practice (DNP)
Blank	Did not arrive (DNA)
Blank	Excluded (EX)

**Bold** – Pole
Italics – Fastest Lap

Notes:

- ‡ — Double points were awarded in the final round at Autódromo Ciudad de Concordia.
