= Bruno Baptista =

Brazilian racing driver

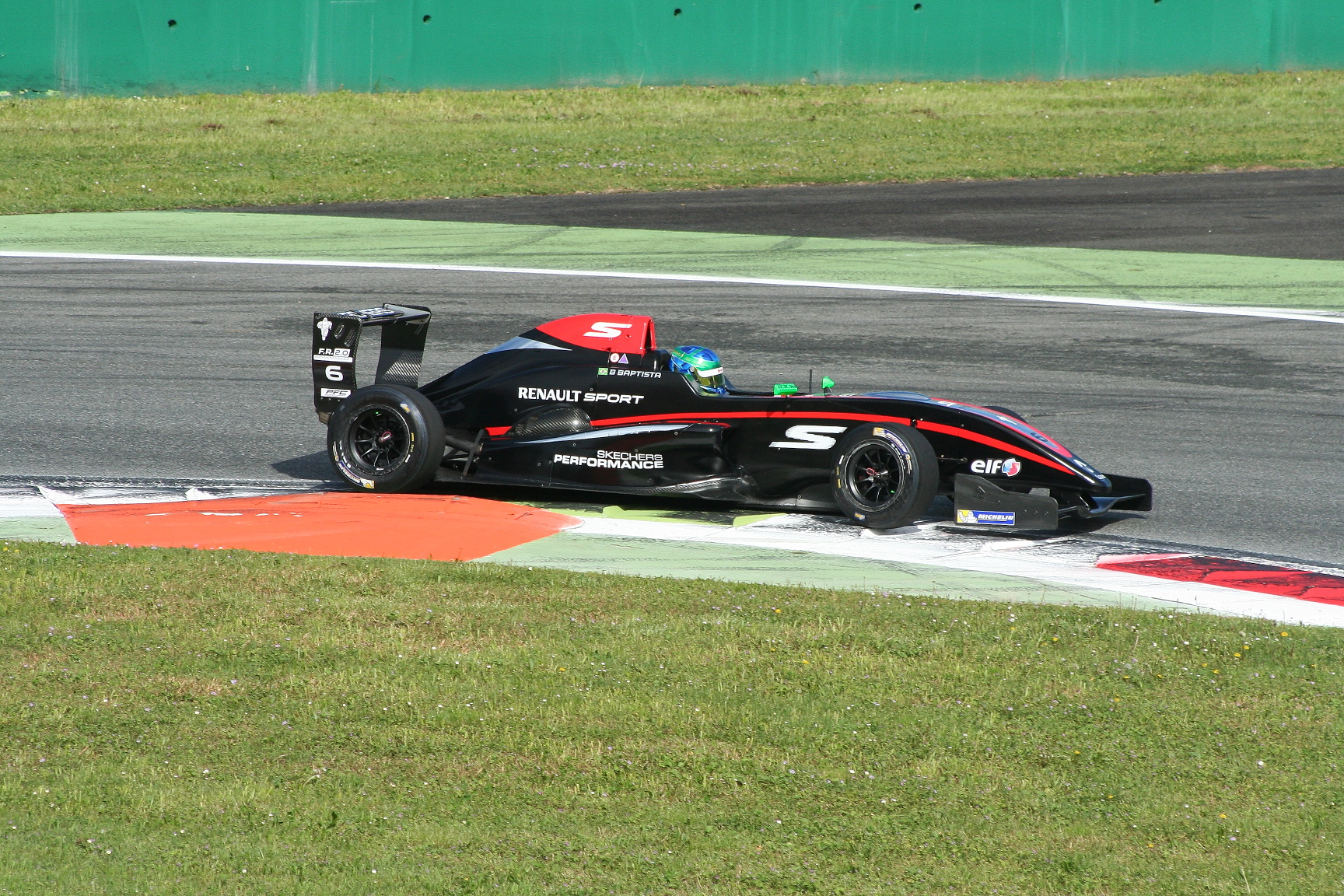
- Nationality: (Brazil) Brazilian
- Born: Bruno Mencarini Baptista; 24 March 1997 (age 29) São Paulo, Brazil
- Relatives: Rodrigo Baptista (cousin)

Eurocup Formula Renault 2.0 career
- Debut season: 2015
- Current team: Fortec Motorsports
- Categorisation: FIA Silver
- Car number: 6
- Former teams: Koiranen GP
- Starts: 27
- Wins: 0
- Poles: 0
- Fastest laps: 0
- Best finish: 14th in 2016

Previous series
- 2016 2015-16 2015 2014: Toyota Racing Series; Formula Renault 2.0 NEC; Formula Renault 2.0 Alps; Formula 4 Sudamericana

Championship titles
- 2014: Formula 4 Sudamericana

Bruno Mencarini Baptista (born 24 March 1997) is a Brazilian racing driver. He competes full-time in the Stock Car Pro Series, driving the No. 44 Toyota Corolla E210 for RCM Motorsport. He is the 2014 F4 Sudamericana champion.

== Career ==
=== GP3 Series ===
In December 2016, Baptista partook in post-season testing with Jenzer Motorsport.

== Racing record ==
=== Career summary ===
Season	Series	Team	Races	Wins	Poles	F/Laps	Podiums	Points	Position
2014	Formula 4 Sudamericana	N/A	17	4	1	6	15	352	**1st**
2015	Formula Renault 2.0 Alps	Koiranen GP	16	0	0	0	0	31	13th
2015	Formula Renault 2.0 NEC	Koiranen GP	7	0	0	0	0	35	24th
2015	Formula Renault 2.0 NEC	Inter Europol	2	0	0	0	0	35	24th
2015	Eurocup Formula Renault 2.0	Koiranen GP	5	0	0	0	0	0	NC†
2015	Eurocup Formula Renault 2.0	Manor MP Motorsport	6	0	0	0	0	0	NC†
2016	Toyota Racing Series	Victory Motor Racing	15	0	0	0	0	443	11th
2016	Eurocup Formula Renault 2.0	Fortec Motorsports	15	0	0	0	0	28	14th
2016	Formula Renault 2.0 NEC	Fortec Motorsports	15	0	0	0	0	97	17th
2017	GP3 Series	DAMS	15	0	0	0	0	3	20th
2017	Porsche GT3 Endurance Cup	?	2	0	0	0	0	104	10th
2018	Stock Car Brasil	HERO Motorsport	20	0	0	0	0	16	26th
2018	Porsche GT3 Cup Brasil - 3.8 Class	Dener Motorsport	12	2	0	2	4	141	**3rd**
2018	Porsche Endurance Series	?	3	0	0	0	0	74	19th
2019	Stock Car Brasil	RCM Motorsport	20	1	0	2	3	177	10th
2019	Porsche Endurance Series	?	3	0	0	0	0	69	16th
2019	Porsche GT3 Cup Brasil	Dener Motorsport	1	0	0	0	1	0	NC†
2020	Stock Car Brasil	RCM Motorsport	18	1	1	1	2	179	12th
2020	Porsche Endurance Series	?	1	0	0	0	0	24	22nd
2021	Stock Car Brasil	RCM Motorsport	23	0	0	0	2	203	13th
2022	Stock Car Pro Series	RCM Motorsport	23	1	1	0	5	252	7th
2022	FIA Motorsport Games GT Cup	Team Brazil	1	0	0	0	0	N/A	9th
2022	FIA Motorsport Games GT Sprint	Team Brazil	1	0	0	0	0	N/A	6th
2023	Stock Car Pro Series	RCM Motorsport	24	1	2	0	3	181	16th
2023	GT World Challenge Europe Endurance Cup	AKKodis ASP Team	3	0	0	0	0	0	NC
2023	GT World Challenge Europe Endurance Cup - Bronze Cup	AKKodis ASP Team	3	0	0	0	0	0	NC
2023	TCR South America Touring Car Championship	Cobra Racing Team	1	0	0	0	0	18	37th
2023	TCR Brazil Touring Car Championship	Cobra Racing Team	1	0	0	0	0	18	24th
2024	Stock Car Pro Series	RCM Motorsport	24	1	0	0	1	767	9th
2025	Stock Car Pro Series	RCM Motorsport	19	0	0	0	1	325	27th
2025	NASCAR Brasil Series	Team RC	2	0	1	0	0	1	39th

^{†} As Baptista was a guest driver, he was ineligible for points.

=== Complete Eurocup Formula Renault 2.0 results ===
(key) (Races in bold indicate pole position; races in italics indicate fastest lap)

Year	Entrant	1	2	3	4	5	6	7	8	9	10	11	12	13	14	15	16	17	DC	Points
2015	Koiranen GP	ALC; 1; 23	ALC; 2; 23†	ALC; 3; 15	SPA; 1; 23	SPA; 2; 27	HUN; 1	HUN; 2	SIL; 1	SIL; 2	SIL; 3								NC†	0
2015	Manor MP Motorsport											NÜR; 1; 27	NÜR; 2; 17	LMS; 1; 14	LMS; 2 DNS	JER; 1 Ret	JER; 2 Ret	JER; 3; 18	NC†	0
2016	Fortec Motorsports	ALC; 1; 6	ALC; 2; 12	ALC; 3; 6	MON; 1 Ret	MNZ; 1 Ret	MNZ; 2; 15	MNZ; 3 Ret	RBR; 1; 9	RBR; 2; 13	LEC; 1 Ret	LEC; 2; 14	SPA; 1; 15	SPA; 2; 12	EST; 1; 8	EST; 2; 9			14th	28

† As Baptista was a guest driver, he was ineligible for points

=== Complete Formula Renault 2.0 Alps Series results ===
(key) (Races in bold indicate pole position; races in italics indicate fastest lap)

Year	Team	1	2	3	4	5	6	7	8	9	10	11	12	13	14	15	16	Pos	Points
2015	Koiranen GP	IMO; 1; 14	IMO; 2; 16†	PAU; 1 Ret	PAU; 2; 14	RBR; 1 Ret	RBR; 2; 8	RBR; 3; 6	SPA; 1; 9	SPA; 2; 9	MNZ; 1 Ret	MNZ; 2 Ret	MNZ; 3 Ret	MIS; 1; 15	MIS; 2 Ret	JER; 1; 19	JER; 2; 19	13th	31

=== Complete Formula Renault 2.0 NEC results ===
(key) (Races in bold indicate pole position) (Races in italics indicate fastest lap)

Year	Entrant	1	2	3	4	5	6	7	8	9	10	11	12	13	14	15	16	DC	Points
2015	Koiranen GP	MNZ; 1	MNZ; 2	SIL; 1	SIL; 2	RBR; 1	RBR; 2	RBR; 3	SPA; 1; 14	SPA; 2; 15			NÜR; 1 Ret	NÜR; 2; 14	HOC; 1; 14	HOC; 2 Ret	HOC; 3; 13	24th	35
2015	Inter Europol										ASS; 1; 23†	ASS; 2; 18						24th	35
2016	Fortec Motorsports	MNZ; 1 Ret	MNZ; 2 Ret	SIL; 1; 12	SIL; 2; 15	HUN; 1; 11	HUN; 2 Ret	SPA; 1 DNS	SPA; 2; 19	ASS; 1; 8	ASS; 2; 15	NÜR; 1; 9	NÜR; 2; 8	HOC; 1; 9	HOC; 2; 21	HOC; 3; 7		17th	97

=== Complete Toyota Racing Series results ===
(key) (Races in bold indicate pole position) (Races in italics indicate fastest lap)

Year	Team	1	2	3	4	5	6	7	8	9	10	11	12	13	14	15	DC	Points
2016	Victory Motor Racing	RUA; 1 Ret	RUA; 2; 8	RUA; 3; 8	TER; 1 Ret	TER; 2; 13	TER; 3; 6	HMP; 1; 9	HMP; 2; 7	HMP; 3 Ret	TAU; 1; 10	TAU; 2; 8	TAU; 3; 7	MAU; 1; 9	MAU; 2; 11	MAU; 3; 9	11th	443

=== Complete GP3 Series results ===
(key) (Races in bold indicate pole position) (Races in italics indicate fastest lap)

Year	Entrant	1	2	3	4	5	6	7	8	9	10	11	12	13	14	15	16	Pos	Points
2017	DAMS	CAT; FEA; 16	CAT; SPR; 13	RBR; FEA; 14	RBR; SPR; Ret	SIL; FEA; 15	SIL; SPR; 14	HUN; FEA; 10	HUN; SPR; Ret	SPA; FEA; Ret	SPA; SPR; 16	MNZ; FEA; 10	MNZ; SPR; C	JER; FEA; 16	JER; SPR; 13	YMC; FEA; 10	YMC; SPR; 9	20th	3

=== Complete Stock Car Pro Series results ===
Year	Team	Car	1	2	3	4	5	6	7	8	9	10	11	12	13	14	15	16	17	18	19	20	21	22	23	24	25	Rank	Points.
2018	RCM Motorsport	Chevrolet Cruze	INT; 1 Ret	CUR; 1; 12	CUR; 2; 14	VEL; 1; 17	VEL; 2; 13	LON; 1; 21	LON; 2 Ret	SCZ; 1; 22	SCZ; 2 DNS	GOI; 1; 18	MOU; 1 Ret	MOU; 2 Ret	CAS; 1; 21	CAS; 2; 16	VCA; 1; 15	VCA; 2; 9	TAR; 1; 15	TAR; 2; 16	GOI; 1; 17	GOI; 2 Ret	INT; 1; 13					26th	16
2019	RCM Motorsport	Chevrolet Cruze	VEL; 1; 16	VCA; 1; 11	VCA; 2; 12	GOI; 1; 17	GOI; 2; 20	LON; 1; 21	LON; 2; 2	SCZ; 1; 8	SCZ; 2 Ret	MOU; 1; 15	MOU; 2; 15	INT; 1; 5	VEL; 1; 6	VEL; 2; 2	CAS; 1 Ret	CAS; 2 DNS	VCA; 1; 8	VCA; 2; 1	GOI; 1; 21	GOI; 2 Ret	INT; 1; 14					10th	177
2020	RCM Motorsport	Toyota Corolla	GOI; 1 Ret	GOI; 2; 3	INT; 1; 10	INT; 2; 11	LON; 1; 17	LON; 2; 5	CAS; 1; 20	**CAS**; **2**; 1	CAS; 3 Ret	VCA; 1 Ret	VCA; 2; 6	CUR; 1; 6	CUR; 2 Ret	CUR; 3 Ret	GOI; 1; 6	GOI; 2; 17	GOI; 3; 9	INT; 1; 7								12th	179
2021	RCM Motorsport	Toyota Corolla	GOI; 1; 4	GOI; 2; 7	INT; 1; 3	INT; 2; 10	VCA; 1; 8	VCA; 2; 17	VCA; 1 Ret	VCA; 2 DNS	CAS; 1; 10	CAS; 2; 7	CUR; 1; 10	CUR; 2; 3	CUR; 1; 13	CUR; 2; 11	GOI; 1; 5	GOI; 2; 12	GOI; 1 Ret	GOI; 2 Ret	VCA; 1; 22	VCA; 2 Ret	SCZ; 1 Ret	SCZ; 2; 7	INT; 1; 16	INT; 2 Ret		13th	203
2022	RCM Motorsport	Toyota Corolla	INT; 1; 21	GOI; 1; 7	GOI; 2; 8	RIO; 1; 14	RIO; 2; 2	VCA; 1; 10	VCA; 2; 3	VEL; 1; 14	VEL; 2 Ret	VEL; 1; 6	VEL; 2; 1	INT; 1; 7	INT; 2 Ret	**VCA**; **1**; 2	VCA; 2; 18	SCZ; 1; 5	SCZ; 2 Ret	GOI; 1; 10	GOI; 2; 3	GOI; 1 Ret	GOI; 2; 10	INT; 1; 15	INT; 2; 7			7th	252
2023	RCM Motorsport	Toyota Corolla	**GOI**; **1**; 2	GOI; 2; 21	INT; 1; 3	INT; 2; 7	TAR; 1; 22	TAR; 2; 16	CAS; 1; 12	CAS; 2; 15	INT; 1; 17	INT; 2 Ret	VCA; 1; 15	VCA; 2 Ret	GOI; 1 Ret	GOI; 2; 6	VEL; 1 Ret	VEL; 2 Ret	BUE; 1; 25	BUE; 2; 25	VCA; 1; 14	VCA; 2; 20	**CAS**; **1**; 1	CAS; 2; 14	INT; 1; 7	INT; 2; 5		16th	181
2024	RCM Motorsport	Toyota Corolla	GOI; 1; 6	GOI; 2; 7	VCA; 1; 4	VCA; 2 C	INT; 1; 21	INT; 2 Ret	CAS; 1; 17	CAS; 2; 1	VCA; 1; 6	VCA; 2; 9	VCA; 3; 7	GOI; 1; 15	GOI; 2; 5	BLH; 1; 19	BLH; 2; 16	VEL; 1; 8	VEL; 2; 6	BUE; 1; 5	BUE; 2; 4	URU; 1; 16	URU; 2; 13	GOI; 1; 26	GOI; 2; 14	INT; 1; 18	INT; 2; 23	9th	767
2025	RCM Motorsport	Mitsubishi Eclipse Cross	INT; 1; 8	CAS; 1; 28	CAS; 2 Ret	VEL; 1; 19	VEL; 2; 21	VCA; 1 Ret	VCA; 2 DSQ	CRS; 1; 13	CRS; 2; 23	CAS; 1; 9	CAS; 2; 21	VCA; 1; 11	VCA; 2; 10	VCA; 1; 3	VCA; 2; 12	MOU; 1; 22	MOU; 2; 23	CUI; 1; 19	CUI; 2; 6	BRA; 1 WD	BRA; 2 WD	INT; 1	INT; 2			27th	325
