= Stock Car Corrida do Milhão =

Stock Car Brasil
- Venue: Autodromo FuelTech Velopark (2026); Interlagos Circuit (2010–2013, 2016, 2019–2020); Autódromo Internacional Ayrton Senna (Goiânia) (2014–2015, 2018); Autódromo Internacional de Curitiba (2017); Autódromo Internacional Nelson Piquet (2008)
- First race: 2008
- Last race: 2020
- Most wins (driver): Thiago Camilo (3)
- Most wins (team): RCM Motorsport (4)
- Most wins (manufacturer): Chevrolet (8)

The Stock Car Corrida do Milhão (Stock Car Million Race) (formally the Corrida do Milhão Goodyear) is a Stock Car Pro Series auto race held annually in Brazil. It was organized by Vicar Promoções Desportivas and the winner earned R$1 million (US$ 303'476), the largest prize given in a South American motorsports championship. The race was not held between 2021–2025. It will be held again in November 2026 in Autodromo FuelTech Velopark.

== History ==
Interlagos Circuit, used in 2010–2013, 2016, 2019–2020

Goiânia External Circuit, used in 2018

Curitiba Full Circuit, used in 2017

Goiânia Mixed Circuit, used in 2014–2015

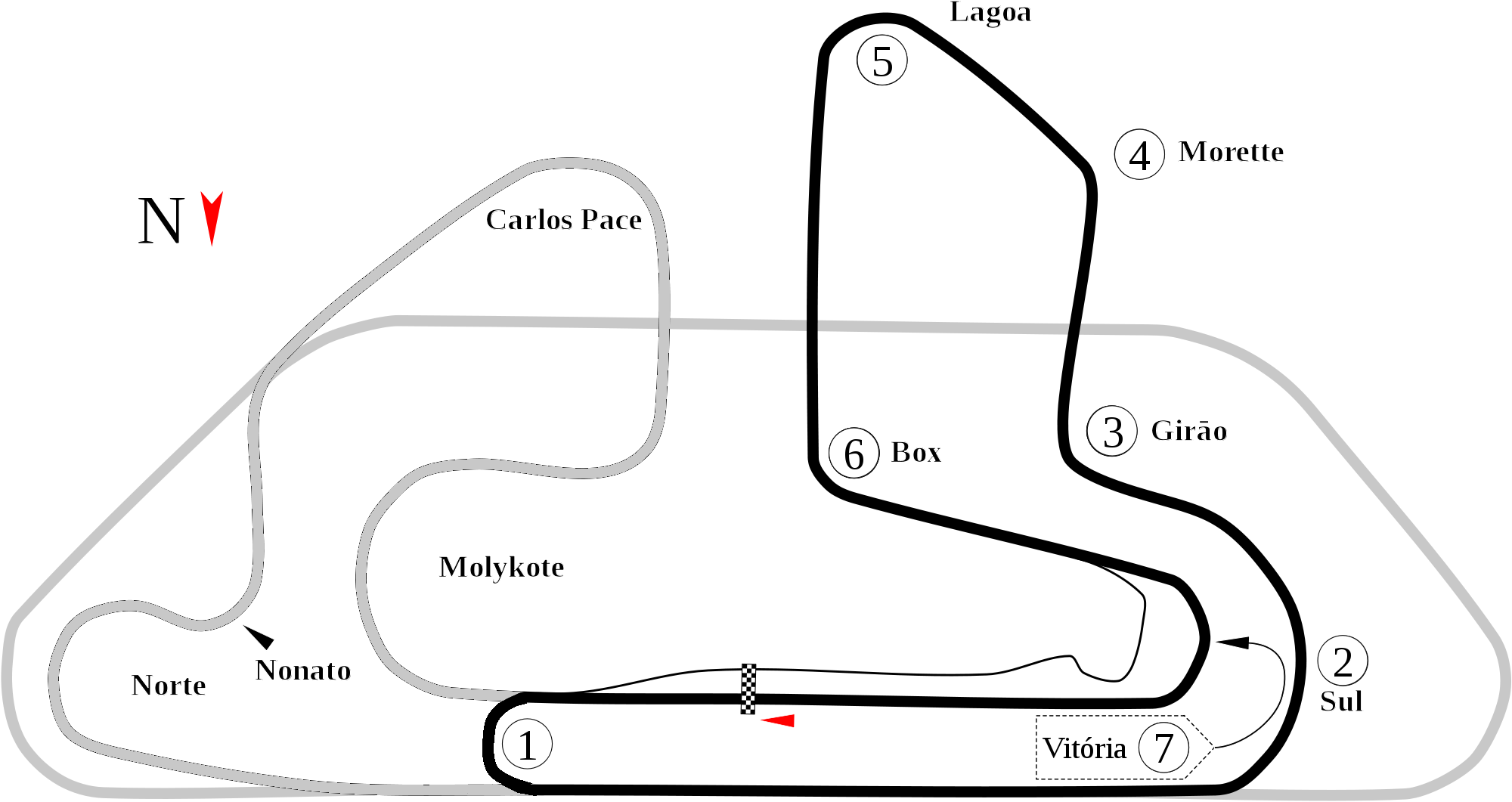
Jacarepaguá Short Circuit, used in 2008

The first race was held in 2008 at Autódromo Internacional Nelson Piquet, Rio de Janeiro, however the event was not held in 2009. The event returned in 2010 having moved to the Autódromo José Carlos Pace in São Paulo. The event was held at the Goiânia in 2014 and 2015. Interlagos hosted the 2016 edition. The 2017 edition moved to Curitiba.

Thiago Camilo and the RCM Motorsport team are the most successful team-driver combination, winning 3 of the 7 events. The first seven events were won by Chevrolet drivers, with Felipe Fraga breaking the drought in 2016, winning for Peugeot on the races' return to Interlagos.

The race was sponsored by SKY Brasil in 2008, Goodyear at 2010, Brasil Máquinas in 2011, and Goodyear returns in 2012.

== Guest drivers ==
- (Canada) Jacques Villeneuve (2011)
- (Brazil) Rubens Barrichello (2012)
- (Brazil) Hélio Castroneves (2012)
- (Brazil) Tony Kanaan (2012)
- (Brazil) Raphael Matos (2012)
- (Brazil) Bruno Senna (2013)
- (Brazil) Lucas di Grassi (2019)

== Results ==
Year	Driver	Manufacturer	Team	Location	Date
2008	(Brazil) Valdeno Brito	Chevrolet	Medley-A.Mattheis	Rio de Janeiro (Short Circuit)	August 31
2009	not held				
2010	(Brazil) Ricardo Maurício	Chevrolet	Eurofarma RC	Interlagos (Grand Prix Circuit)	September 5
2011	(Brazil) Thiago Camilo	Chevrolet	RCM Motorsport	Interlagos (Grand Prix Circuit)	August 7
2012	(Brazil) Thiago Camilo	Chevrolet	RCM Motorsport	Interlagos (Grand Prix Circuit)	December 9
2013	(Brazil) Ricardo Zonta	Chevrolet	BMC Racing	Interlagos (Grand Prix Circuit)	December 15
2014	(Brazil) Rubens Barrichello	Chevrolet	Full Time Sports	Goiânia (Mixed Grand Prix Circuit)	August 3
2015	(Brazil) Thiago Camilo	Chevrolet	Ipiranga-RCM	Goiânia (Mixed Grand Prix Circuit)	August 16
2016	(Brazil) Felipe Fraga	Peugeot	Cimed Racing	Interlagos (Grand Prix Circuit)	September 11
2017	(Brazil) Daniel Serra	Chevrolet	Eurofarma RC	Curitiba (Full Circuit)	July 2
2018	(Brazil) Rubens Barrichello	Chevrolet	Full Time Sports	Goiânia (External Circuit)	August 5
2019	(Brazil) Ricardo Maurício	Chevrolet	Eurofarma RC	Interlagos (Grand Prix Circuit)	August 25
2020	(Brazil) Ricardo Zonta	Toyota	RCM Motorsport	Interlagos (Grand Prix Circuit)	August 25
2021–2025	not held				
