= Ricardo Zonta =

Brazilian racing driver (born 1976)

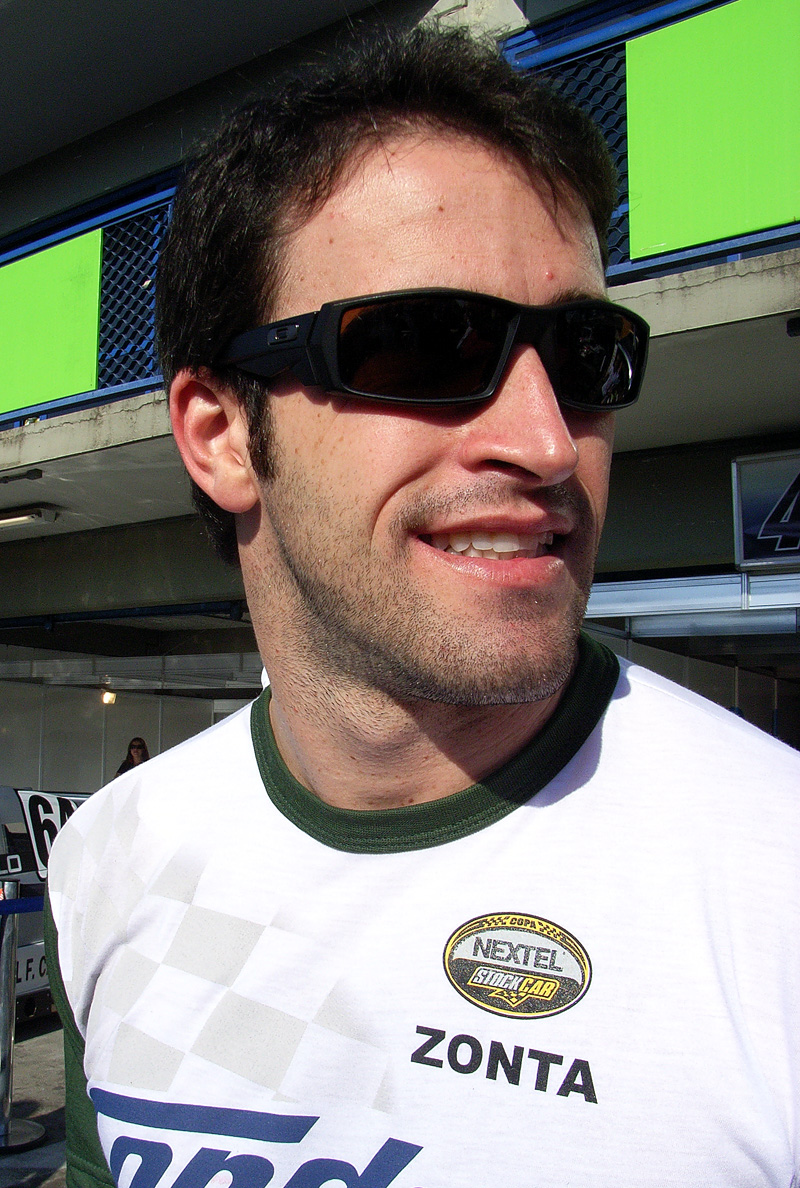
- Zonta in 2007, as a Stock Car Brasil driver
- Born: Ricardo Luiz Zonta; 23 March 1976 (age 50); Curitiba, Paraná, Brazil

Formula One World Championship career
- Nationality: (Brazil) Brazilian
- Active years: 1999–2001, 2004–2005
- Team(s): BAR, Jordan, Toyota
- Entries: 38 (36 starts)
- Championships: 0
- Wins: 0
- Podiums: 0
- Career points: 3
- Pole positions: 0
- Fastest laps: 0
- First entry: 1999 Australian Grand Prix
- Last entry: 2005 United States Grand Prix

24 Hours of Le Mans career
- Years: 1998, 2008
- Teams: AMG-Mercedes, Peugeot
- Best finish: 3rd (2008)
- Class wins: 0
- Categorisation: FIA Platinum

Ricardo Luiz Zonta (Brazilian Portuguese pronunciation: [ʁiˈkaʁdu luˈiz ˈzõtɐ]; born March 23, 1976) is a Brazilian professional racing driver. He currently competes full-time in the Brazilian Stock Car Pro Series, driving the No. 10 Mitsubishi Eclipse Cross for RCM Motorsport.

== Early career ==
Born in Curitiba, Brazil, Zonta began karting in 1987, winning his first race shortly thereafter. The following year, he was runner-up for the Curitiba Karting Championship, and in 1991, he won the title. He continued karting until 1992, finishing fourth in the São Paulo Karting Championship before progressing to single-seaters for 1993. He finished sixth in the Brazilian Formula Chevrolet Championship, and then in 1994, came fifth in the Brazilian Formula Three Championship. A year later, Zonta won both the Brazilian and South American Formula Three Championships.

Moving to Europe in 1996, Zonta competed in the International Formula 3000 Championship for Draco Racing, winning two races and finishing fourth overall. In the same year, he became the first Brazilian to compete in International Touring Cars, with Mercedes. In 1997, he won three races and the Formula 3000 championship. He also took home the "Golden Helmet" award for best international driver for his efforts. The Jordan Formula One team signed him as their official test driver following his championship, and in 1998, he was signed by McLaren boss Ron Dennis. Zonta tested with the McLaren Formula One team in 1998, and concurrently won the FIA GT Championship (GT1 class) and the "Golden Helmet" award in the "world prominence" category.

In October 1998, immediately after winning the FIA GT championship, Zonta signed up with the B.A.R. Formula One racing team as one of its race drivers for the 1999 season, after rejecting offers from Jordan and Sauber.

== Formula One career ==
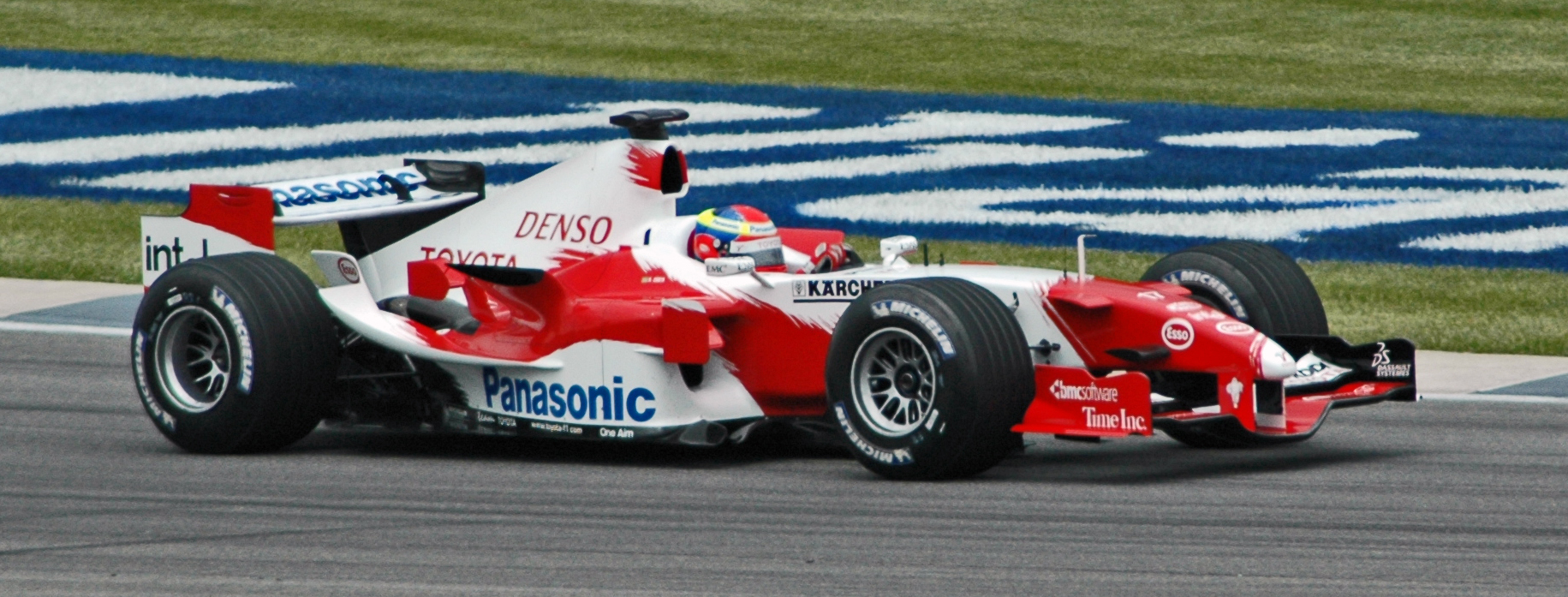
Zonta qualifying in place of an injured Ralf Schumacher at the 2005 United States Grand Prix.

In 1999, Zonta started as a Formula One racing driver alongside 1997 World Champion Jacques Villeneuve at new team BAR. He injured his foot in an accident during practice for the Brazilian Grand Prix, and was forced to miss three races. He also had a large accident at Spa-Francorchamps, and finished the season with no championship points. Zonta remained with BAR for the 2000 season, scoring his first world championship point with a sixth place in the opening race. He had another large accident when his front suspension broke during testing at Silverstone, but continued the season, scoring points in both the Italian and United States Grands Prix, to finish 14th in the championship. Replaced by Olivier Panis for the 2001 season, Zonta became the third driver for the Jordan team, replacing the injured Heinz-Harald Frentzen for one race, and then again when Frentzen was sacked, but was overlooked to replace him for the remainder of the season.

In 2002, Zonta decided to focus on the Telefónica World Series, which he won. He was then hired as test driver for the Toyota F1 team in 2003, retaining the position in 2004. Toward the end of the season, the team sacked Cristiano da Matta from a race seat, and Zonta drove in four Grands Prix. In Belgium, he was running in fourth place three laps from the finish when his engine failed. In Suzuka the team hired Jarno Trulli and Zonta had to sit the event out, but the team allowed him to compete in his home race, the Brazilian Grand Prix, which he finished in 13th. He continued as a test driver for Toyota in 2005, alongside veteran French pilot Olivier Panis. At the US Grand Prix later that year, he stood in for the injured Ralf Schumacher and took his place on the grid, only for Toyota, like the other six Michelin-shod teams, to withdraw from the race due to safety concerns. 2006 saw Zonta continue with Toyota as the team's third and test driver. He was confirmed as test driver for the Renault Formula One team for the 2007 season on 6 September 2006.

== After Formula One ==
In 2007, Zonta entered the Stock Car Brasil series in parallel with the work for the Renault team. In 2008, he contested the 24 Hours of Le Mans with Peugeot Sport, driving the No. 9 car alongside Franck Montagny and Formula One tester Christian Klien.

Zonta is also driving in the Grand Am Championship in America with Krohn Racing, while also being the team owner and driver of RZ Motorsport in Stock Car Brasil.

== Personal life ==
Two of Zonta's relatives, Billy and Brendon, are also racing drivers. Billy used to compete in the Sprint Race series until he was forced to retire in 2016 after being diagnosed with cancer. Brendon is currently active in Sprint Race's continuation series NASCAR Brasil Sprint Race, driving the No. 7 Ford Mustang in the AM class.

== Racing career ==
=== Career summary ===
Season	Series	Team	Races	Wins	Poles	F/Laps	Podiums	Points	Position
1993	Formula Chevrolet	?	?	?	?	?	?	?	6th
1994	Formula 3 Sudamericana	?	?	0	?	?	?	?	5th
1995	Formula 3 Sudamericana	Cesário Fórmula	13	6	5	7	9	76	1st
1996	International Formula 3000 Championship	Draco Engineering	10	2	1	2	4	27	4th
1996	International Touring Car Championship	Warsteiner Mercedes-AMG	2	0	0	0	0	0	29th
1997	International Formula 3000 Championship	Super Nova Racing	10	3	4	4	5	77	1st
1998	FIA GT Championship	AMG Mercedes	10	5	4	1	9	77	1st
1998	24 Hours of Le Mans	AMG Mercedes	1	0	0	0	0	N/A	NC
1999	Formula One	British American Racing	12	0	0	0	0	0	22nd
2000	Formula One	Lucky Strike Reynard BAR Honda	17	0	0	0	0	3	14th
2001	Formula One	B&H Jordan Honda	2	0	0	0	0	0	19th
2002	World Series by Nissan	Gabord Competicion	18	9	8	9	14	268	1st
2003	Porsche Supercup	Porsche AG	1	0	0	0	0	0	NC
2003	Formula One	Panasonic Toyota Racing	Test Driver						
2004	Formula One	Panasonic Toyota Racing	5	0	0	0	0	0	22nd
2005	Formula One	Panasonic Toyota Racing	1	0	0	0	0	0	NC
2006	Formula One	Panasonic Toyota Racing	Test Driver						
2007	Stock Car Brasil	L&M Racing	12	0	0	1	0	13	29th
2007	Formula One	ING Renault F1 Team	Test Driver						
2008	Stock Car Brasil	L&M Racing	6	0	0	0	0	23	24th
2008	24 Hours of Le Mans	Peugeot Sport Total	1	0	0	0	1	N/A	3rd
2009	Stock Car Brasil	RZ Motorsport	9	0	1	0	1	48	16th
2010	Stock Car Brasil	RZ Motorsport	11	0	0	0	0	36	20th
2010	FIA GT1 World Championship	Reiter Engineering	12	3	1	0	4	75	8th
2011	Stock Car Brasil	RZ Motorsport	12	0	0	2	1	51	15th
2011	FIA GT1 World Championship	Sumo Power GT	6	0	0	0	0	9	28th
2012	Stock Car Brasil	RZ Motorsport	12	0	0	0	0	89	13th
2013	Stock Car Brasil	RZ Motorsport	12	1	0	1	1	144	7th
2013	FIA GT Series	BMW Sport Trophy Team Brasil	10	0	0	0	0	29	15th
2014	Stock Car Brasil	RZ Motorsport	21	0	0	0	1	108	14th
2015	Stock Car Brasil	Shell Racing	21	0	0	0	2	147	13th
2016	Stock Car Brasil	Shell Racing	21	0	1	0	1	130	16th
2017	Stock Car Brasil	Shell V-Power	22	2	0	2	3	174	11th
2018	Stock Car Brasil	Shell V-Power	21	1	1	2	3	184	8th
2019	Stock Car Brasil	Shell V-Power	21	0	0	0	1	155	14th
2020	Stock Car Brasil	RCM Motorsport	18	2	1	0	5	278	2nd
2021	Stock Car Brasil	RCM Motorsport	24	1	1	1	7	307	4th
2022	Stock Car Pro Series	RCM Motorsport	23	1	1	4	6	262	5th
2023	Stock Car Pro Series	RCM Motorsport	24	3	2	4	5	280	3rd
2024	Stock Car Pro Series	RCM Motorsport	25	0	0	1	5	864	4th
2025	Stock Car Pro Series	RCM Motorsport	23	0	0	0	0	428	23rd
2025	NASCAR Brasil Series	R.Mattheis Motorsport	19	0	0	2	0	88	15th
2026	Stock Car Pro Series	Full Time Gazoo Racing	17	0	0	0	0	322	23rd*

^{*} Season still in progress.

=== Complete International Formula 3000 results ===
(key) (Races in bold indicate pole position) (Races in italics indicate fastest lap)

Year	Entrant	1	2	3	4	5	6	7	8	9	10	DC	Points
1996	Draco Engineering	NÜR; Ret	PAU; 3	PER; Ret	HOC; 6	SIL; 3	SPA; 9	MAG; Ret	EST; 1	**MUG**; 1	HOC; 11	4th	27
1997	Super Nova Racing	**SIL**; DSQ	PAU; Ret	HEL; Ret	**NÜR**; 1	PER; 2	HOC; 1	A1R; 2	SPA; 5	**MUG**; 1	**JER**; Ret	1st	39

=== Complete International Touring Car Championship results ===
(key) (Races in bold indicate pole position) (Races in italics indicate fastest lap)

Year	Team	Car	1	2	3	4	5	6	7	8	9	10	11	12	13	14	15	16	17	18	19	20	21	22	23	24	25	26	Pos.	Pts
1996	Warsteiner Mercedes-AMG	Mercedes C-Class V6	HOC; 1	HOC; 2	NÜR; 1	NÜR; 2	EST; 1	EST; 2	HEL; 1	HEL; 2	NOR; 1	NOR; 2	DIE; 1	DIE; 2	SIL; 1	SIL; 2	NÜR; 1 Ret	NÜR; 2; 13	MAG; 1	MAG; 2	MUG; 1	MUG; 2	HOC; 1	HOC; 2	INT; 1	INT; 2	SUZ; 1	SUZ; 2	29th	0

=== Complete FIA GT Championship results ===
Year	Entrant	Class	Chassis	Engine	1	2	3	4	5	6	7	8	9	10	Rank	Points
1998	AMG Mercedes	GT1	Mercedes-Benz CLK LM	Mercedes-Benz M119 6.0L V8	OSC; 1	SIL; 4	HOC; 2	DIJ; 1	HUN; 2	SUZ; 2	**DON**; 2	**A1R**; 1	**HMS**; 1	**LAG**; 1	1st	77

=== 24 Hours of Le Mans results ===
Year	Team	Co-Drivers	Car	Class	Laps	Pos.	Class Pos.
1998	(Germany) AMG-Mercedes	(France) Jean-Marc Gounon (France) Christophe Bouchut	Mercedes-Benz CLK LM	GT1	31	DNF	DNF
2008	(France) Peugeot Sport Total	(France) Franck Montagny (Austria) Christian Klien	Peugeot 908 HDi FAP	LMP1	379	**3rd**	**3rd**

=== Complete Formula One results ===
(key)

Year	Entrant	Chassis	Engine	1	2	3	4	5	6	7	8	9	10	11	12	13	14	15	16	17	18	19	WDC	Pts.
1999	British American Racing	BAR 01	Supertec V10	AUS; Ret	BRA; DNQ	SMR	MON	ESP	CAN; Ret	FRA; 9	GBR; Ret	AUT; 15^{†}	GER; Ret	HUN; 13	BEL; Ret	ITA; Ret	EUR; 8	MAL; Ret	JPN; 12				22nd	0
2000	Lucky Strike Reynard BAR Honda	BAR 002	Honda V10	AUS; 6	BRA; 9	SMR; 12	GBR; Ret	ESP; 8	EUR; Ret	MON; Ret	CAN; 8	FRA; Ret	AUT; Ret	GER; Ret	HUN; 14	BEL; 12	ITA; 6	USA; 6	JPN; 9	MAL; Ret			14th	3
2001	B&H Jordan Honda	Jordan EJ11	Honda V10	AUS	MAL	BRA	SMR	ESP	AUT	MON	CAN; 7	EUR	FRA	GBR	GER; Ret	HUN	BEL	ITA	USA	JPN			19th	0
2004	Panasonic Toyota Racing	Toyota TF104	Toyota V10	AUS; TD	MAL; TD	BHR; TD	SMR; TD	ESP; TD	MON; TD	EUR; TD	CAN; TD	USA; TD	FRA; TD	GBR; TD	GER; TD								22nd	0
2004	Panasonic Toyota Racing	Toyota TF104B	Toyota V10													HUN; Ret	BEL; 10^{†}	ITA; 11	CHN; Ret	JPN	BRA; 13		22nd	0
2005	Panasonic Toyota Racing	Toyota TF105	Toyota V10	AUS; TD	MAL; TD	BHR; TD	SMR; TD	ESP; TD	MON; TD	EUR; TD	CAN; TD	USA; DNS	FRA	GBR; TD	GER; TD	HUN; TD	TUR; TD	ITA; TD	BEL; TD	BRA; TD	JPN; TD	CHN; TD	NC	0

^{†} Driver did not finish the Grand Prix, but was classified as they had completed over 90% of the race distance.

=== Complete World Series by Nissan results ===
(key) (Races in bold indicate pole position) (Races in italics indicate fastest lap)

Year	Team	1	2	3	4	5	6	7	8	9	10	11	12	13	14	15	16	17	18	DC	Points
2002	Gabord Competición	VAL1; 1; 1	VAL1; 2; 3	**JAR**; **1**; 1	**JAR**; **2**; 1	ALB; 1; 2	ALB; 2; 2	MNZ; 1; 5	MNZ; 2; 5	**MAG**; **1**; 1	MAG; 2; 2	CAT; 1; 1	**CAT**; **2**; 1	VAL2; 1; 1	**VAL2**; **2**; 2	**CUR**; **1**; 1	CUR; 2; 1	**INT**; **1** DNS	**INT**; **2**; 5	1st	270

=== Complete Stock Car Pro Series results ===
Year	Team	Car	1	2	3	4	5	6	7	8	9	10	11	12	13	14	15	16	17	18	19	20	21	22	23	24	25	Pos	Points
2007	L&M Racing	Peugeot 307	INT; DNQ	CTB; 22	CGD; 26	INT; Ret	LON; Ret	SCZ; 11	CTB; Ret	BSB; 25	ARG; 9	TAR; Ret	RIO; 15	INT; 22														29th	13
2008	L&M Racing	Peugeot 307	INT; 14	BSB; Ret	CTB	SCZ	CGD	INT	RIO	LON; 22	CTB	BSB; 7	TAR; Ret	INT; 5														24th	23
2009	RZ Motorsport	Peugeot 307	INT; DSQ	CTB; 6	BSB	SCZ	INT; 25	SAL	RIO; 10	CGD; 14	**CTB**; 14	BSB; 2	TAR; Ret	INT; 13														16th	48
2010	RZ Motorsport	Chevrolet Vectra	INT; Ret	CTB; 13	VEL; 15	RIO; Ret	RBP; 8	SAL; Ret	INT; Ret	CGD; 5	LON; 21	SCZ	BSB; Ret	CTB; 5														20th	36
2011	RZ Motorsport	Chevrolet Vectra	CTB; 3	INT; 8	RBP; Ret	VEL; 11	CGD; 16	RIO; 22	INT; 15	SAL; 7	SCZ; 21	LON; 5	BSB; 20	VEL; 25														15th	51
2012	RZ Motorsport	Chevrolet Sonic	INT; 26	CTB; Ret	VEL; 6	RBP; 19	LON; 12	RIO; 24	SAL; 14	CGD; 22	TAR; 10	CUR; Ret	BRA; 8	INT; 5														13th	89
2013	RZ Motorsport	Chevrolet Sonic	INT; 23	CUR; 6	TAR; 4	SAL; 28	BRA; 9	CAS; 14	RBP; 18	CAS; 29	VEL; 5	CUR; 8	BRA; 8	INT; 1														7th	144
2014	RZ Motorsport	Chevrolet Sonic	INT; 1; 24	SCZ; 1; 17	SCZ; 2; 5	BRA; 1; 5	BRA; 2; 24	GOI; 1 Ret	GOI; 2 Ret	GOI; 1; 17	CAS; 1; 14	CAS; 2; 22	CUR; 1; 31	CUR; 2 DNS	VEL; 1; 5	VEL; 2; 5	SCZ; 1; 23	SCZ; 2; 16	TAR; 1; 6	TAR; 2; 3	SAL; 1; 7	SAL; 2 Ret	CUR; 1 Ret					14th	108
2015	Shell Racing	Chevrolet Sonic	GOI; 1; 21	RBP; 1 Ret	RBP; 2 Ret	VEL; 1; 13	VEL; 2; 8	CUR; 1; 24	CUR; 2 Ret	SCZ; 1; 12	SCZ; 2; 14	CUR; 1; 6	CUR; 2; 18	GOI; 1; 3	CAS; 1; 2	CAS; 2; 14	MOU; 1; 11	MOU; 2; 12	CUR; 1 Ret	CUR; 2; 9	TAR; 1; 5	TAR; 2; 9	INT; 1; 8					13th	147
2016	Shell Racing	Chevrolet Cruze	CUR; 1; 5	VEL; 1; 14	VEL; 2 DNS	GOI; 1; 16	GOI; 2; 4	SCZ; 1; 10	**SCZ**; **2**; 9	TAR; 1 Ret	TAR; 2; 8	CAS; 1; 2	CAS; 2; 10	INT; 1; 22†	LON; 1 Ret	LON; 2; 5	CUR; 1; 14	CUR; 2 Ret	GOI; 1 Ret	GOI; 2 DSQ	CRI; 1 DSQ	CRI; 2 DNS	INT; 1; 13					16th	130
2017	Shell V-Power	Chevrolet Cruze	GOI; 1 Ret	GOI; 2; 1	VEL; 1 Ret	VEL; 2; 6	SCZ; 1; 7	SCZ; 2; 18	CAS; 1; 18	CAS; 2 DSQ	CUR; 1; 22	CRI; 1; 4	CRI; 2; 10	VCA; 1; 17	VCA; 2; 11	LON; 1; 16	LON; 2; 1	ARG; 1; 14	ARG; 2; 12	TAR; 1; 13	TAR; 2; 10	GOI; 1; 2	GOI; 2; 19	INT; 1; 13				11th	174
2018	Shell V-Power	Chevrolet Cruze	INT; 1; 4	CUR; 1; 20	CUR; 2; 8	VEL; 1; 2	VEL; 2; 7	LON; 1; 13	LON; 2; 11	SCZ; 1; 13	SCZ; 2; 13	GOI; 1; 6	MOU; 1; 12	MOU; 2 DSQ	CAS; 1; 16	CAS; 2; 9	VCA; 1; 8	VCA; 2; 4	TAR; 1; 3	TAR; 2 Ret	GOI; 1 DSQ	GOI; 2 Ret	**INT**; **1**; 1					8th	184
2019	Shell V-Power	Chevrolet Cruze	VEL; 1; 11	VCA; 1 DSQ	VCA; 2 DSQ	GOI; 1; 2	GOI; 2; 21	LON; 1; 26	LON; 2; 17	SCZ; 1; 5	SCZ; 2; 11	MOU; 1; 19	MOU; 2; 20	INT; 1; 8	VEL; 1; 12	VEL; 2; 18	CAS; 1; 14	CAS; 2; 15	VCA; 1; 6	VCA; 2; 4	GOI; 1; 18	GOI; 2; 7	INT; 1 Ret					14th	155
2020	RCM Motorsport	Toyota Corolla	**GOI**; **1**; 1	GOI; 2 Ret	INT; 1; 3	INT; 2; 1	LON; 1; 11	LON; 2; 13	CAS; 1; 9	CAS; 2 Ret	CAS; 3; 2	VCA; 1; 12	VCA; 2; 4	CUR; 1; 12	CUR; 2; 6	CUR; 3; 5	GOI; 1 Ret	GOI; 2; 5	GOI; 3; 10	INT; 1; 2								2nd	278
2021	RCM Motorsport	Toyota Corolla	GOI; 1; 16	GOI; 2; 15	INT; 1; 16	INT; 2; 4	**VCA**; **1**; 2	VCA; 2; 3	VCA; 1; 10	VCA; 2; 1	CAS; 1; 13	CAS; 2; 2	CUR; 1; 22	CUR; 2; 4	CUR; 1 Ret	CUR; 2; 10	GOI; 1 Ret	GOI; 2 DNS	GOI; 1; 3	GOI; 2; 7	VCA; 1; 2	VCA; 2; 6	SCZ; 1; 10	SCZ; 2; 5	INT; 1; 12	INT; 2; 2		4th	307
2022	RCM Motorsport	Toyota Corolla	INT; 1; 5	GOI; 1; 20	GOI; 2; 13	RIO; 1; 18	RIO; 2 Ret	**VCA**; **1**; 1	VCA; 2; 25	VEL; 1; 2	VEL; 2; 11	VEL; 1 DSQ	VEL; 2 Ret	INT; 1; 15	INT; 2; 3	VCA; 1; 6	VCA; 2; 2	SCZ; 1; 7	SCZ; 2; 18	GOI; 1; 2	GOI; 2; 2	GOI; 1; 12	GOI; 2; 17	INT; 1; 13	INT; 2; 4			5th	262
2023	RCM Motorsport	Toyota Corolla	GOI; 1; 3	GOI; 2; 17	INT; 1; 10	INT; 2; 17	TAR; 1; 24	TAR; 2; 4	CAS; 1; 11	CAS; 2 Ret	INT; 1; 6	INT; 2; 1	VCA; 1; 1	VCA; 2 Ret	GOI; 1; 4	GOI; 2; 8	VEL; 1; 15	VEL; 2; 2	BUE; 1; 27	BUE; 2; 10	VCA; 1 Ret	VCA; 2 Ret	CAS; 1; 6	CAS; 2; 4	**INT**; **1**; 1	INT; 2; 10		3rd	280
2024	RCM Motorsport	Toyota Corolla	GOI; 1; 5	GOI; 2; 19	VCA; 1; 2	VCA; 2 C	INT; 1; 5	INT; 2; 6	CAS; 1; 2	CAS; 2; 5	VCA; 1; 4	VCA; 2; 20	VCA; 3; 14	GOI; 1; 3	GOI; 2; 10	BLH; 1; 17	BLH; 2; 11	VEL; 1; 12	VEL; 2 Ret	BUE; 1; 2	BUE; 2; 10	URU; 1; 10	URU; 2; 6	GOI; 1; 10	GOI; 2; 19	INT; 1; 2	INT; 2; 10	4th	864
2025	RCM Motorsport	Mitsubishi Eclipse Cross	INT; 1; 12	CAS; 1 Ret	CAS; 2; 9	VEL; 1; 20	VEL; 2; 25	VCA; 1; 27	VCA; 2; 15	CRS; 1; 25	CRS; 2; 16	CAS; 1; 12	CAS; 2; 17	VCA; 1; 18	VCA; 2; 14	VCA; 1; 18	VCA; 2; 16	MOU; 1; 4	MOU; 2; 16	CUI; 1; 15	CUI; 2; 26	BRA; 1 DSQ	BRA; 2; 6	INT; 1; 8	INT; 2; 9			23rd	428
2026	Full Time Gazoo Racing	Toyota Corolla Cross	CRS; 1; 20	CRS; 2; 27	CAS; 1; 18	CAS; 2; 6	INT; 1; 14	INT; 2; 21	GOI; 1; 15	GOI; 2 Ret	CUI; 1	CUI; 2	VCA; 1; 6	VCA; 2; 16	SCZ; 1; 15	SCZ; 2; 12	CRS; 1; 14	CRS; 2; 21	BRA; 1; 19	CAS; 1; 23	CAS; 2; 16	VEL; 1	INT; 1	INT; 2				23rd*	322*

^{†} Driver did not finish the race, but was classified as he completed over 90% of the race distance. ^{*} Season still in progress.

=== Complete GT1 World Championship results ===
Year	Team	Car	1	2	3	4	5	6	7	8	9	10	11	12	13	14	15	16	17	18	19	20	Pos	Points
2010	Reiter	Lamborghini Murciélago LP 670 R-SV	ABU; QR; 10	ABU; CR; 5	SIL; QR	SIL; CR	BRN; QR	BRN; CR	PRI; QR; 13	PRI; CR; 10	SPA; QR; 2	SPA; CR; 1	NÜR; QR; 4	NÜR; CR; 14	ALG; QR	ALG; CR	NAV; QR; 1	NAV; CR; 1	INT; QR; Ret	INT; CR; Ret	SAN; QR	SAN; CR	8th	75
2011	Sumo Power GT	Nissan GT-R GT1	ABU; QR; 4	ABU; CR; Ret	ZOL; QR; 12	ZOL; CR; Ret	ALG; QR; 8	ALG; CR; 7	SAC; QR	SAC; CR	SIL; QR	SIL; CR	NAV; QR	NAV; CR	PRI; QR	PRI; CR	ORD; QR	ORD; CR	BEI; QR	BEI; CR	SAN; QR	SAN; CR	28th	9

=== Complete FIA GT Series results ===
Year	Team	Car	Class	1	2	3	4	5	6	7	8	9	10	11	12	Pos.	Points
2013	BMW Sport Trophy Team Brasil	BMW Z4 GT3	Pro	NOG; QR; 6	NOG; CR; 9	ZOL; QR; 11	ZOL; CR; 8	ZAN; QR; 9	ZAN; CR; 5	SVK; QR; 7	SVK; CR; 4	NAV; QR	NAV; CR	BAK; QR; 14	BAK; CR; Ret	15th	29

Sporting positions
Preceded by Cristiano da Matta	Brazilian Formula 3 Championship; Champion; 1995	Succeeded by Pedro Piquet (2014)
Preceded by Gabriel Furlán	Formula 3 Sudamericana; Champion; 1995	Succeeded by Gabriel Furlán
Preceded by Jörg Müller	International Formula 3000; Champion; 1997	Succeeded by Juan Pablo Montoya
Preceded by Bernd Schneider	FIA GT Championship; Champion; 1998; With: Klaus Ludwig	Succeeded by Olivier Beretta; Karl Wendlinger
Preceded by Franck Montagny	World Series by Nissan; Champion; 2002	Succeeded by Franck Montagny
