= RCM Motorsport =

(Brazil) RCM Motorsport
- Founded: 2007
- Team principal(s): Rosinei Campos; Marcel Campos
- Current series: Stock Car Pro Series
- Current drivers: Stock Car Pro Series; 10. Ricardo Zonta; 44. Bruno Baptista
- Drivers' Championships: Stock Series; 2008. Fabio Carreira
- Website: http://www.rccompeticoes.com/

RCM Motorsport is a Brazilian auto racing team based in Curitiba, Paraná. Currently competing in Stock Car Pro Series. The team debuted in 2009 as customer team of RC Competições. RCM Motorsport team are the most successful team on Stock Car Corrida do Milhão combination, winning 4 of the 11 events.

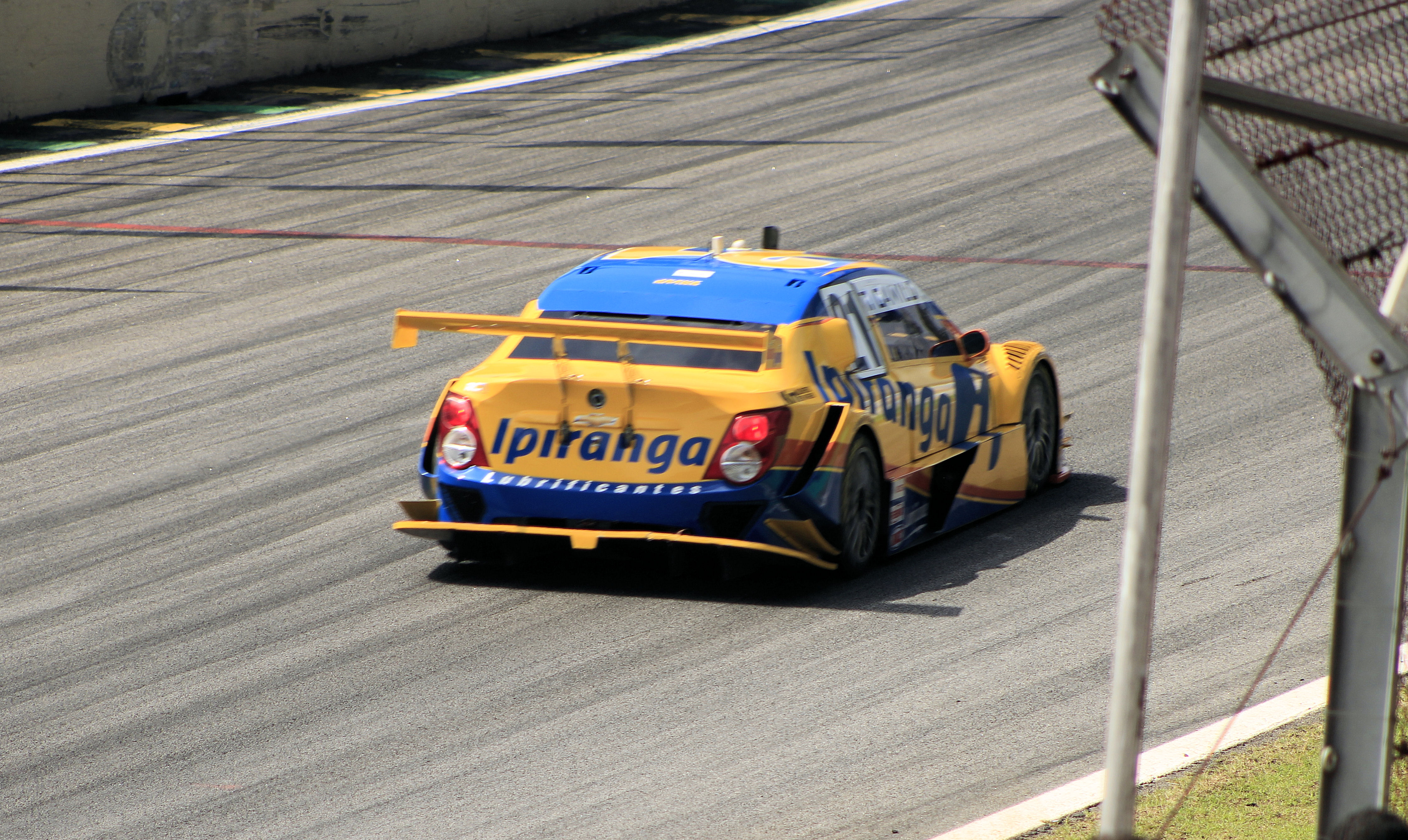
The #21 Ipiranga Racing Chevrolet Sonic being driven by Thiago Camilo at Interlagos
