= 2019 Stock Car Brasil Championship =

Car racing competition

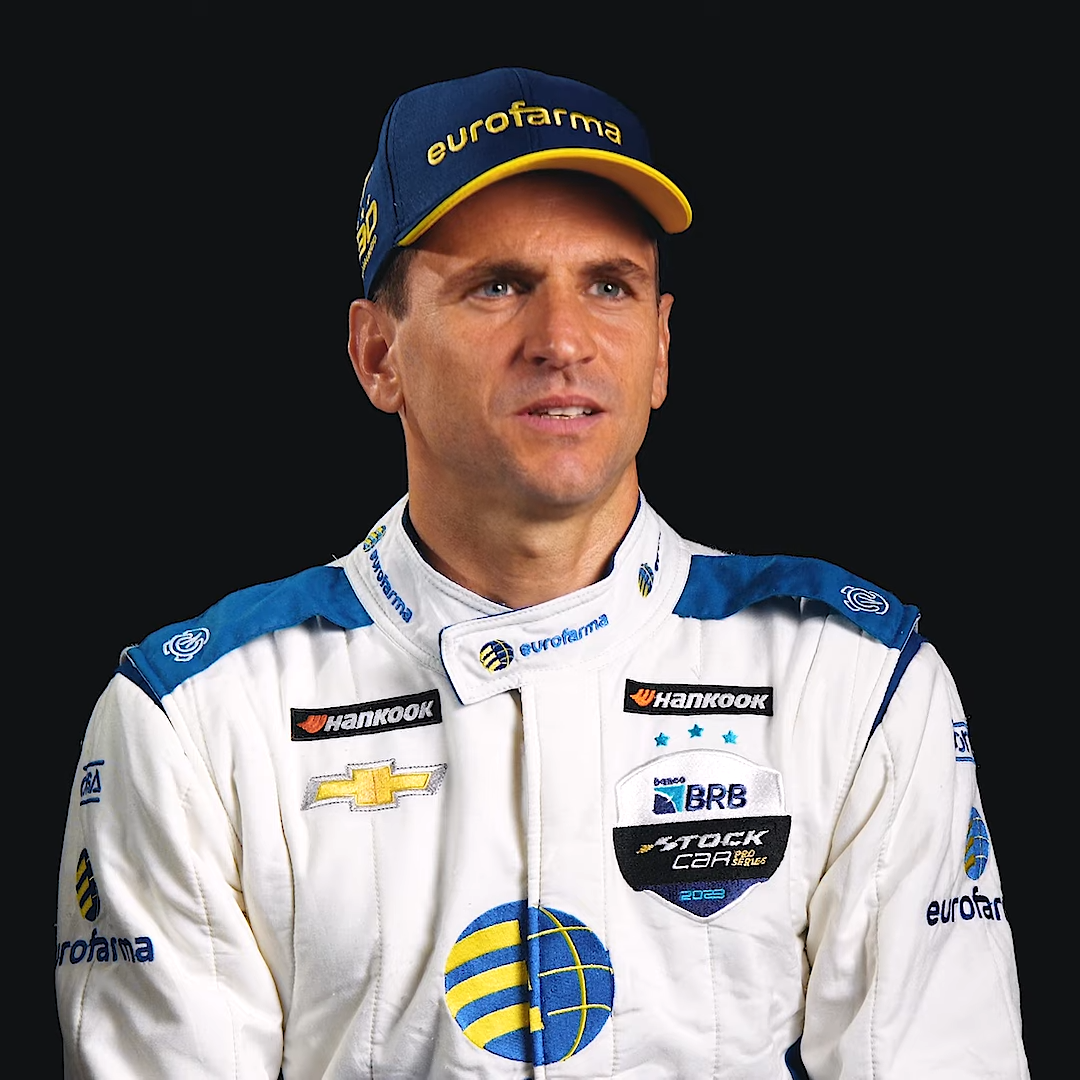
Daniel Serra (pictured in 2023) won his third Drivers' Championship

The 2019 Stock Car Brasil Championship was the forty-first season of the Stock Car Brasil. Daniel Serra won the 2019 season, he became three-time champion as his father Chico Serra. This was the last season with as one-make series. From 2020 Toyota Gazoo Racing will enter in the series with eight cars.

== Teams and drivers ==
All teams compete with a Chevrolet Cruze Stock Car.

Team	No.	Drivers	Rounds
Cimed Racing	0	(Brazil) Cacá Bueno	All
Cimed Racing	88	(Brazil) Felipe Fraga	All
Eurofarma RC	1	(Brazil) Lucas Di Grassi	7
Eurofarma RC	29	(Brazil) Daniel Serra	All
Eurofarma RC	90	(Brazil) Ricardo Maurício	All
Ipiranga Racing	3	(Brazil) Bia Figueiredo	All
Ipiranga Racing	21	(Brazil) Thiago Camilo	All
Prati-Donaduzzi	4	(Brazil) Júlio Campos	All
Prati-Donaduzzi	77	(Brazil) Valdeno Brito	All
Cavaleiro Sports	5	(Brazil) Denis Navarro	All
Cavaleiro Sports	110	(Brazil) Felipe Lapenna	All
Hot Car Competições	8	(Brazil) Rafael Suzuki	All
Hot Car Competições	43	(Brazil) Pedro Cardoso	1-8
Hot Car Competições	46	(Brazil) Tuca Antoniazzi	10-12
Vogel Motorsport	9	(Brazil) Gustavo Lima	1-8, 10-12
Vogel Motorsport	12	(Brazil) Lucas Foresti	All
Shell V-Power	10	(Brazil) Ricardo Zonta	All
Shell V-Power	51	(Brazil) Átila Abreu	1, 3-12
Shell V-Power	120	(Brazil) Vitor Baptista	2
Full Time Bassani	11	(Brazil) Gaetano di Mauro	All
Full Time Bassani	28	(Brazil) Galid Osman	All
Blau Motorsport	18	(Brazil) Allam Khodair	All
Blau Motorsport	30	(Brazil) César Ramos	All
Carlos Alves Competições	27	(Brazil) Raphael Reis	2-4, 11-12
Full Time Sports	33	(Brazil) Nelson Piquet Jr.	All
Full Time Sports	111	(Brazil) Rubens Barrichello	All
RCM Motorsport (Note: RCM is a customer team of Eurofarma RC.)	44	(Brazil) Bruno Baptista	All
RCM Motorsport	65	(Brazil) Max Wilson	All
KTF Sports	70	(Brazil) Diego Nunes	All
KTF Sports	80	(Brazil) Marcos Gomes	1-10, 12
KTF Sports	85	(Brazil) Guilherme Salas	11
Crown Racing (Note: Crown Racing is a customer team of Cimed Racing)	83	(Brazil) Gabriel Casagrande	All
Crown Racing	177	(Brazil) Marcel Colleta	All
YPF Elaion (Note: YPF Elaion is a customer team of Hot Car Competições.)	86	(Argentina) Agustín Canapino	5

=== Team changes ===
- Crown Racing joined the series replacing Cimed-ProGP in a partnership with Cimed Racing after Cacá Bueno join as a partner alongside William Lube and Duda Pamplona, owner of ProGP that left the series.
- Cavaleiros Sports reduced their program from Three to two cars.
- Hot Car Competições lost their longtime sponsor Bardahl after ten seasons.
- After debuting in the final round of 2018, KTF Sports made their full-season debut with two cars. The team purchased the vacant space left by the departure of Squadra G-Force.
- HERO departed as a sponsor after two seasons, one of which with RCM Motorsport.
- Shell V-Power announced a partnership with Full Time Sports and Bassani Racing. This partnership was entered as Shell Helix Ultra.
- Mico's Racing did not return for this season.
- Carlos Alves Competições reduced their schedule for the season, appearing at only 5 rounds.

=== Driver changes ===
- Valdeno Brito returned to R.Mattheis Motorsport-Prati Donaduzzi. Brito competed for the team from 2012 to 2016.
- Galid Osman moved from Cavaleiro Sports to Shell Helix Ultra. Porsche GT3 Cup 2018 runner-up Gaetano di Mauro will race alongside Osman.
- Ricardo Mauricio returned to Eurofarma RC after only one season at Full Time Sports. Max Wilson was relocated to the customer team RCM.
- Third place in 2018 Stock Car Light season Pedro Cardoso made the debut in Hot Car Competições.
- Lucas Foresti and Marcos Gomes left Cimed Racing Team. Foresti will join Vogel Motorsport and Gomes will race for newcomer team KTF Sports alongside Diego Nunes, who had moved from Full Time Bassani.
- Marcel Coletta will be the youngest driver in the history of Stock Car. He competes the new team Crown Racing alongside Gabriel Casagrande, who moved from Vogel Motorsport
- Nelson Piquet Jr. moved to Full Time Sports after one season with their customer team.
- Lucas di Grassi left the series to focus on Formula E.
- 2018 full-time drivers Antonio Pizzonia and Vitor Genz will not race this season.

=== Mid-season changes ===
- 2018 Stock Car Light champion Raphael Reis was entered with Carlos Alves Competições for some races, but the driver and team did not contest the full season.
- Átila Abreu did not compete at the second round after suffering a fractured vertebra in a collision at Velopark. Porsche Carrera Cup driver Vitor Baptista filled in for him for the round at Velo Città.
- Lucas di Grassi entered as wildcard in the Million Race round for Eurofarma RC.
- Argentine driver Agustin Canapino raced at the sixth round as wildcard to YPF Elaion Hot Car Competiçoes. Pedro Cardoso and Hot Car broke after the eight round, in his place entered rookie driver Tuca Antoniazzi.
- Marcos Gomes was replaced for 2019 Stock Car Light champion Guilherme Salas due 4 Hours of Shanghai of Asian Le Mans Series, that Gomes competed for HubAuto Corsa.
- Guga Lima lose the nine round for personal reasons.

== Race calendar and results ==
The 2019 calendar was announced on December 20, 2018. The first round coincided with the 500th Stock Car Brazil race. The 40th anniversary of the championship was held in Tarumã. The Race of Doubles was the third round, held at Goiânia on May 19. The 11th edition of the Million Race was held on August 25 at the Interlagos Circuit. The Grand Final will also be held in Interlagos on December 15.

Round		Circuit	Date	Pole Position	Fastest lap	Winning driver	Winning team
1		(Brazil) Stock Car 500 Velopark, Nova Santa Rita	April 7	(Brazil) Thiago Camilo	(Brazil) Thiago Camilo	(Brazil) Daniel Serra	Eurofarma RC
2	R1	(Brazil) Autódromo Velo Città, Mogi Guaçu	May 5	(Brazil) Thiago Camilo	(Brazil) Daniel Serra	(Brazil) Thiago Camilo	Ipiranga Racing
2	R2	(Brazil) Autódromo Velo Città, Mogi Guaçu	May 5		(Brazil) Nelson Piquet Jr.	(Brazil) Rubens Barrichello	Full Time Sports
3	R1	(Brazil) Autódromo Internacional Ayrton Senna, Goiânia	May 19	(Brazil) Thiago Camilo	(Brazil) Thiago Camilo	(Brazil) Thiago Camilo	Ipiranga Racing
3	R2	(Brazil) Autódromo Internacional Ayrton Senna, Goiânia	May 19		(Brazil) Daniel Serra	(Brazil) Rubens Barrichello	Full Time Sports
4	R1	(Brazil) Autódromo Internacional Ayrton Senna, Londrina	June 9	(Brazil) Thiago Camilo	(Brazil) Thiago Camilo	(Brazil) Thiago Camilo	Ipiranga Racing
4	R2	(Brazil) Autódromo Internacional Ayrton Senna, Londrina	June 9		(Brazil) Bruno Baptista	(Brazil) Ricardo Mauricio	Eurofarma RC
5	R1	(Brazil) Autódromo Internacional de Santa Cruz do Sul, Santa Cruz do Sul	July 21	(Brazil) Júlio Campos	(Brazil) Daniel Serra	(Brazil) Júlio Campos	Prati-Donaduzzi
5	R2	(Brazil) Autódromo Internacional de Santa Cruz do Sul, Santa Cruz do Sul	July 21		(Brazil) Denis Navarro	(Brazil) Ricardo Mauricio	Eurofarma RC
6	R1	(Brazil) Autódromo Internacional Orlando Moura, Campo Grande	August 11	(Brazil) Thiago Camilo	(Brazil) Júlio Campos	(Brazil) Thiago Camilo	Ipiranga Racing
6	R2	(Brazil) Autódromo Internacional Orlando Moura, Campo Grande	August 11		(Brazil) Rubens Barrichello	(Brazil) Rubens Barrichello	Full Time Sports
7		(Brazil) 11ª Corrida do Milhão Pirelli 2019, Autódromo José Carlos Pace, São Paulo	August 25	(Brazil) Lucas Di Grassi	(Brazil) Ricardo Mauricio	(Brazil) Ricardo Mauricio	Eurofarma RC
8	R1	(Brazil) Velopark, Nova Santa Rita	September 15	(Brazil) Ricardo Mauricio	(Brazil) Felipe Fraga	(Brazil) Felipe Fraga	Cimed Racing
8	R2	(Brazil) Velopark, Nova Santa Rita	September 15		(Brazil) Bruno Baptista	(Brazil) Rubens Barrichello	Full Time Sports
9	R1	(Brazil) Autódromo Internacional de Cascavel, Cascavel	October 20	(Brazil) Gabriel Casagrande	(Brazil) Gabriel Casagrande	(Brazil) Felipe Fraga	Cimed Racing
9	R2	(Brazil) Autódromo Internacional de Cascavel, Cascavel	October 20		(Brazil) César Ramos	(Brazil) Átila Abreu	Shell V-Power
10	R1	(Brazil) Autódromo Velo Città	November 10	(Brazil) Thiago Camilo	(Brazil) Gabriel Casagrande	(Brazil) Thiago Camilo	Ipiranga Racing
10	R2	(Brazil) Autódromo Velo Città	November 10		(Brazil) Lucas Foresti	(Brazil) Bruno Baptista	RCM
11	R1	(Brazil) Autódromo Internacional Ayrton Senna, Goiânia	November 25	(Brazil) Gabriel Casagrande	(Brazil) Thiago Camilo	(Brazil) Gabriel Casagrande	Crown Racing
11	R2	(Brazil) Autódromo Internacional Ayrton Senna, Goiânia	November 25		(Brazil) Nelson Piquet Jr.	(Brazil) Felipe Fraga	Cimed Racing
12		(Brazil) Grande Final, Autódromo José Carlos Pace, São Paulo	December 15	(Brazil) Marcos Gomes	(Brazil) Marcos Gomes	(Brazil) Thiago Camilo	Ipiranga Racing

== Championship standings ==
Points system

Points are awarded for each race at an event to the driver/s of a car that completed at least 75% of the race distance and was running at the completion of the race.

Points format	Position																			
Points format	1st	2nd	3rd	4th	5th	6th	7th	8th	9th	10th	11th	12th	13th	14th	15th	16th	17th	18th	19th	20th
Feature races	30	26	22	19	17	15	14	13	12	11	10	9	8	7	6	5	4	3	2	1
Sprint races	24	20	18	17	16	15	14	13	12	11	10	9	8	7	6	5	4	3	2	1
Final race	60	52	44	38	34	30	28	26	24	22	20	18	16	14	12	10	8	6	4	2

- **Feature races** Used for the first race of each event.
- Sprint races:The second race of each event, with partially reversed (top ten) grid.
- Final race: Used for the last round of the season with double points.

=== Drivers' Championship ===
Pos	Driver	VEL	VCA		GOI		LON		SCZ		MS		INT	VEL		CAS		VCA		GOI		INT	Pts
1	(Brazil) Daniel Serra	1	2	15	3	3	4	Ret	2	7	8	5	3	9	6	4	14	3	3	4	10	2	387
2	(Brazil) Thiago Camilo	**4**	**1**	Ret	**1**	11	**1**	9	Ret	DNS	**1**	16	4	4	4	13	2	1	19	5	13	1	366
3	(Brazil) Ricardo Mauricio	3	3	9	15	6	7	1	22	1	6	2	1	**3**	3	17	5	12	8	16	DSQ	7	320
4	(Brazil) Felipe Fraga	5	5	5	Ret	9	5	6	Ret	DNS	5	4	12	1	7	1	13	7	16	6	1	6	313
5	(Brazil) Rubens Barrichello	2	7	1	6	1	Ret	8	9	12	14	1	Ret	7	1	5	3	13	5	19	4	8	310
6	(Brazil) Júlio Campos	10	9	19	9	2	3	10	**1**	6	2	13	10	8	15	12	4	5	6	10	5	9	307
7	(Brazil) Gabriel Casagrande	9	4	3	20	5	22	11	Ret	Ret	17	3	2	2	Ret	2	7	2	15	1	9	4	303
8	(Brazil) Cacá Bueno	21	17	2	8	12	15	Ret	7	8	3	12	14	5	5	3	11	4	9	11	14	19	234
9	(Brazil) Bruno Baptista	17	11	12	18	20	21	2	8	Ret	15	15	5	6	2	Ret	DNS	8	1	21	Ret	14	177
10	(Brazil) Marcos Gomes	6	6	Ret	4	7	8	13	21	Ret	10	14	8	21	Ret	10	Ret	24	12			**3**	174
11	(Brazil) Diego Nunes	18	8	17	12	15	23	5	Ret	14	Ret	8	11	Ret	17	20	12	9	2	12	16	5	175
12	(Brazil) Átila Abreu	DNS			19	Ret	10	3	3	Ret	Ret	7	15	23	Ret	7	1	10	10	23	11	11	164
13	(Brazil) Nelson Piquet Jr.	7	20	Ret	22	10	6	7	16	3	18	18	6	17	12	11	17	23	17	7	2	Ret	163
14	(Brazil) Ricardo Zonta	11	DSQ	DSQ	2	21	26	17	5	11	19	20	8	12	18	14	15	6	4	18	7	Ret	155
15	(Brazil) Max Wilson	16	25	11	5	4	11	14	4	10	7	10	25	10	Ret	Ret	Ret	Ret	14	Ret	DNS	Ret	140
16	(Brazil) Galid Osman	20	16	Ret	7	8	14	12	6	5	16	17	24	Ret	13	19	Ret	22	23	22	12	10	130
17=	(Brazil) Allam Khodair	12	14	4	11	14	20	Ret	Ret	Ret	9	19	Ret	11	21	Ret	8	17	Ret	14	17	Ret	119
17=	(Brazil) Valdeno Brito	Ret	21	8	10	18	2	Ret	Ret	Ret	Ret	Ret	13	14	22	8	Ret	25	Ret	9	3	17	119
19	(Brazil) Gaetano Di Mauro	14	13	10	21	13	Ret	Ret	15	Ret	4	Ret	7	18	16	Ret	Ret	16	11	Ret	6	Ret	112
20=	(Brazil) Lucas Foresti	13	10	20	13	16	13	Ret	10	Ret	21	11	18	12	8	Ret	16	19	21	3	21	DSQ	110
20=	(Brazil) Denis Navarro	22	15	13	16	25	16	Ret	17	2	Ret	9	20	16	Ret	6	18	20	Ret	24	15	12	110
22	(Brazil) César Ramos	8	Ret	7	Ret	Ret	12	Ret	14	Ret	Ret	Ret	17	Ret	10	18	Ret	7	Ret	2	Ret	Ret	103
23	(Brazil) Rafael Suzuki	15	12	18	17	17	17	Ret	12	Ret	Ret	Ret	16	24	11	9	6	14	20	Ret	18	Ret	94
24	(Brazil) Marcel Coletta	Ret	19	22	23	Ret	9	15	18	Ret	11	Ret	21	20	9	16	9	11	13	Ret	DNS	Ret	81
25	(Brazil) Bia Figueiredo	19	22	16	Ret	22	Ret	4	23	Ret	13	21	Ret	19	20	15	10	15	18	Ret	19	16	73
26	(Brazil) Guga Lima	Ret	23	21	Ret	Ret	21	16	20	4	20	6	19	25	14			21	22	17	20	15	65
27	(Brazil) Felipe Lapenna	23	24	6	24	19	24	Ret	19	13	Ret	Ret	23	15	19	DSQ	DSQ	18	Ret	13	Ret	Ret	46
28	(Brazil) Pedro Cardoso	Ret	18	Ret	Ret	24	19	Ret	13	9	12	22	22	22	Ret								34
29	(Brazil) Guilherme Salas																			8	9		26
30	(Argentina) Agustin Canapino								11	Ret													10
31	(Brazil) Raphael Reis		Ret	Ret	Ret	23	18	Ret												15	Ret	Ret	9
32=	(Brazil) Vitor Baptista		Ret	14																			7
32=	(Brazil) Tuca Antoniazzi																			20	22	18	7
–	(Brazil) Lucas di Grassi												**DSQ**										–

Colour	Result
Gold	Winner
Silver	Second place
Bronze	Third place
Green	Points classification
Blue	Non-points classification
Blue	Non-classified finish (NC)
Purple	Retired, not classified (Ret)
Red	Did not qualify (DNQ)
Red	Did not pre-qualify (DNPQ)
Black	Disqualified (DSQ)
White	Did not start (DNS)
White	Withdrew (WD)
White	Race cancelled (C)
Blank	Did not practice (DNP)
Blank	Did not arrive (DNA)
Blank	Excluded (EX)

**Bold** – Pole position
Italics – Fastest lap
† – Retired, but classified
