= Gaetano di Mauro =

Brazilian racing driver (born 1997)

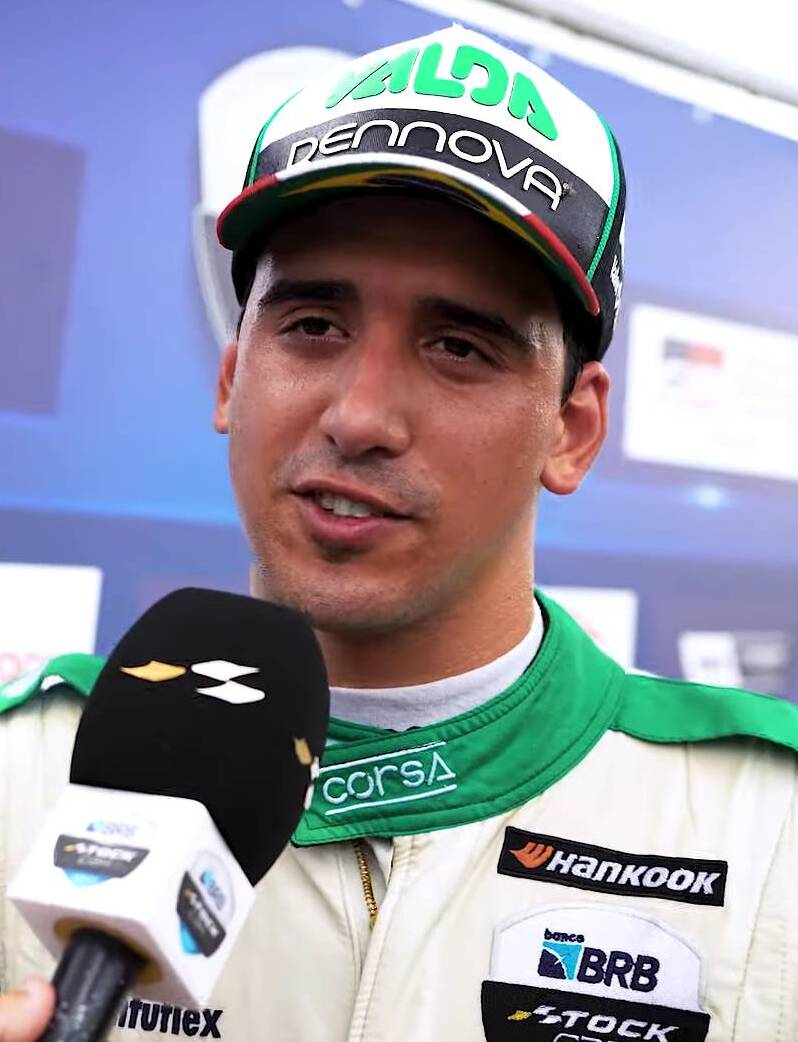
- di Mauro in 2024
- Nationality: (Brazil) Brazilian
- Born: Gaetano Souza Gomes di Mauro; 1 July 1997 (age 29) São Paulo, Brazil

Stock Car Pro Series career
- Debut season: 2018
- Current team: Eurofarma RC
- Categorisation: FIA Gold
- Car number: 11
- Starts: 138
- Wins: 5
- Poles: 1
- Fastest laps: 1
- Best finish: 11th in 2022

Championship titles
- 2013 2023: Sprint Race Brasil; Império Endurance Brasil

Gaetano Souza Gomes di Mauro (born 1 July 1997) is a Brazilian racing driver currently competing in Stock Car Pro Series with Eurofarma RC. He is known for winning eight Brazil Kart Championship titles and being the best-performing rookie in the 2019 Stock Car Brasil Championship.

== Career ==
=== Karting ===
Di Mauro competed in karting from a young age, and took his first major victory in 2012 when he won the Brazilian Kart Championship in the shifter KZ class, a feat that he repeated in 2013, 2016 and 2017. Following his 2013 victory, he competed in the 500 Milhas de Beto Carrero race alongside Rubens Barrichello and Tony Kanaan, which the team won.

In 2018, di Mauro finished fourth in the FIA Karting International Super Cup, part of the Karting World Championship. The following year, he won his fifth Brazilian Kart Championship title. This earnt him a position at Thunder Technology, helping to develop their KZ and Graduados karts.

=== Early career ===
Di Mauro made his touring car debut in 2013 in the Sprint Race Brasil championship, where he won the title. He also made an appearance in Formula 3 Sudamericana, taking a podium in Brasília.

In 2014, di Mauro competed in the BRDC Formula 4 Championship for Petroball Racing, making his international single-seater debut. He finished eighth overall, taking one win at Brands Hatch from pole position. He also competed in the BRDC F4 Winter Series in the same year, where he was runner-up, taking two wins and finishing on the podium in every race he finished.

Di Mauro was due to compete in the series again for 2015, and turned down an offer from the Shell Racing Academy to compete in Fórmula 3 Brasil in order to do so. However, Petroball pulled out of the championship before the season began due to funding issues, and he spent the year karting in Europe and Brazil instead.

=== Touring cars ===
In 2017, di Mauro competed in the Campeonato Brasileiro de Turismo. He won the opening race of the season, which led to 80 kg (180 lb) of performance ballast being added to his car. As di Mauro weighed 80 kg (180 lb) when wearing his racing gear, he likened this to "carrying a twin brother as a passenger". Despite this, he finished as runner-up in the standings, taking three wins and three additional podiums.

He moved to Porsche GT3 Cup Brasil to 2018, sponsored by Shell Racing Academy, where he again found success in the 3.8 class. The championship came down to the final round at Interlagos, however he suffered a flat tyre and could not finish the race. He again was the runner-up, taking three wins and another four podiums. He was then invited to the final event of the Porsche Endurance Series, which he won from pole alongside Nonô Figueiredo.

=== Stock Car Pro Series ===
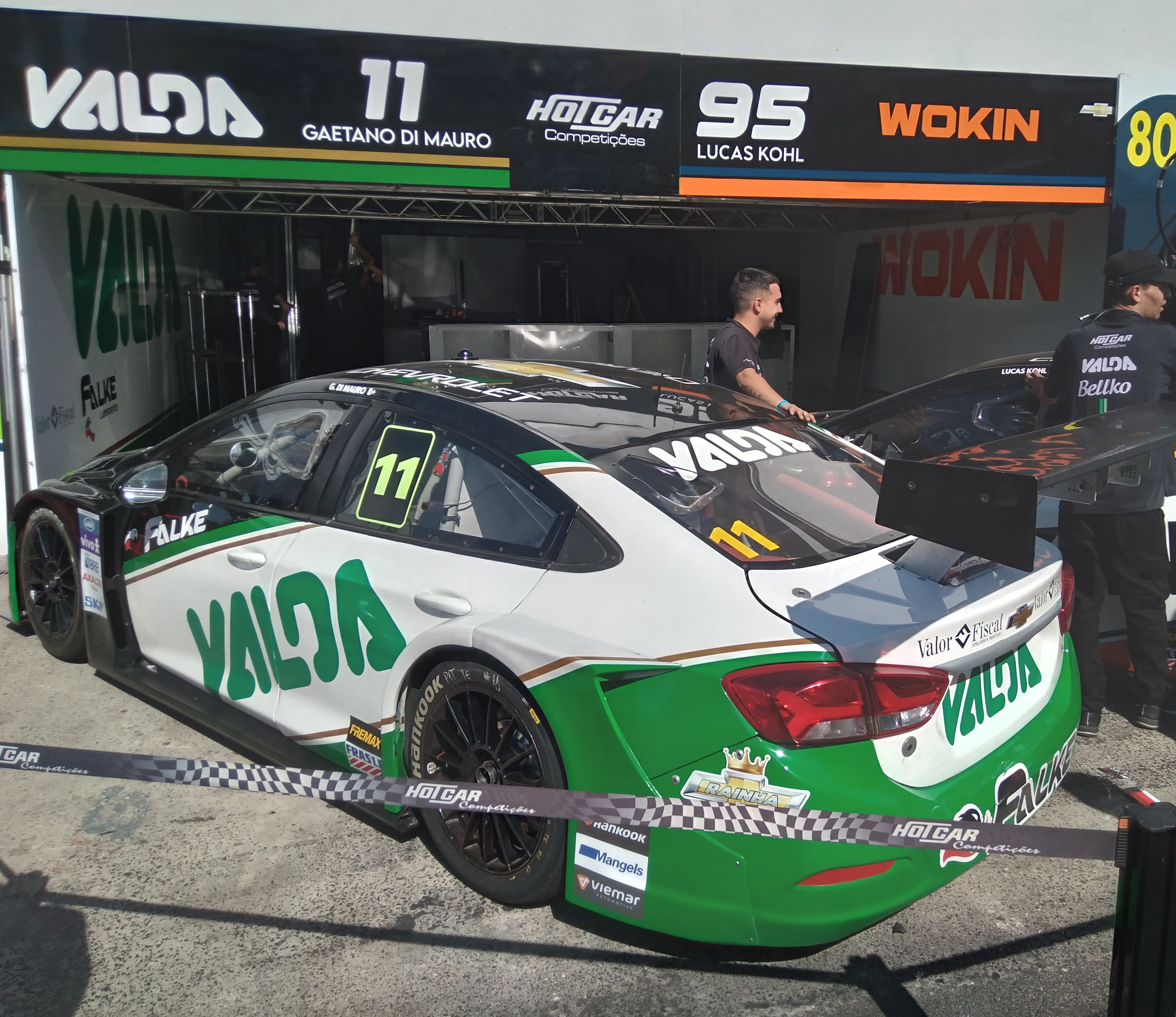
Gaetano Di Mauro's No. 11 car in 2023

Di Mauro made his Stock Car Brasil debut in the final round of 2018, where he finished tenth. Shell Racing Academy promoted him to a full-time seat with Full Time Sports in 2019, making him the first driver from the academy to compete in the series. He finished as the highest rookie in the standings with nineteenth place, taking a best race result of fourth at Campo Grande, and continued in the series for 2020 with Vogel Motorsport. His first two podiums came in 2021, and he took his first race win in 2022 at Velopark along with three additional podiums to finish eleventh in the overall standings. In 2023, he switched teams to Hot Car Competições and finished twentieth with one podium.

In 2024, di MauroŎ moved to Cavaleiro Sports. His first win of the season came in round three at Interlagos, after taking the lead from Marcos Gomes with twenty minutes remaining and successfully holding off Felipe Baptista for the rest of the race. He took his maiden pole position in the penultimate round in Goiânia. He finished seventeenth in the damp reverse-grid sprint race, but went on to win the main race of the event, comfortably holding the lead throughout the race. He finished sixteenth overall in the standings.

For the 2025 season, di Mauro joined Eurofarma RC, operated by RC Competições, a move which became known after his win at Velo Città the previous year. He had his personal best start to a season, driving from eighth to second in the opening race at Interlagos to finish just behind teammate Felipe Fraga. He took another podium in round two, and his first win of the year in round three.

== Karting record ==
=== Karting career summary ===
Season	Series	Team	Position
2011	Rotax Challenge Grand Finals – 125 Junior		47th
2011	Brazilian Kart Championship – Sudam Junior		6th
2011	500 Milhas de Kart – Kart Mini M2	MR Competições	15th
2011	Super Kart Brasil – Graduados		9th
2012	500 Milhas de Kart – KZ		10th
2012	Brazilian Kart Championship – KZ		1st
2013	WSK Master Series – KZ2	Energy	43rd
2013	South Garda Winter Cup – KZ2	Energy	21st
2013	Andrea Margutti Trophy – KZ2	Energy	10th
2013	Brazilian Kart Championship – KZ		1st
2013	500 Milhas de Kart – KZ		1st
2014	Super Kart Brasil – Shifter Kart	CRG	1st
2015	FIK European Championship – KZ2	CRG	50th
2016	ROK Cup International Final – Shifter ROK		3rd
2016	Brazilian Kart championship – KZ		1st
2017	FIK European Championship – KZ2	CRG	7th
2017	WSK Final Cup – KZ2	CRG	14th
2017	Trofeo delle Industrie – KZ2	CRG	19th
2017	Brazilian Kart Championship – KZ	CRG	1st
2018	FIK International Super Cup – KZ2	CRG	4th
2018	Brazilian Kart Championship – KZ	CRG	2nd
2019	Brazilian Kart Championship – KZ	CRG	1st
2020	Brazilian Kart Championship – KZ	Tony Kart	1st
2022	Brazilian Kart Championship – KZ		1st
2024	Brazilian Kart Championship – KZ		1st

== Racing record ==
=== Racing career summary ===
Season	Series	Team	Races	Wins	Poles	F/Laps	Podiums	Points	Position
2013	Fórmula 3 Sudamericana – Class B	RR Racing	4	0	0	1	1	25	8th
2013	Sprint Race Brasil		16	5	8	5	9	277	**1st**
2014	BRDC Formula 4 Championship	Petroball Racing	24	1	1	0	3	301	8th
2014	BRDC F4 Winter Series	Petroball Racing	8	2	2	0	7	205	**2nd**
2014	Mercedes-Benz Challenge – CLA AMG Cup	Linardi Sports	2	0	0	0	0	0	34th
2014	Formula 3 Brasil – Class A	Hitech Racing	2	0	0	0	0	3	12th
2015	Copa Petrobras de Marcas	C2 Team	2	0	0	0	0	NC	NC
2015	Sprint Race Brasil – Pro		2	1	1	1	1	25	11th
2016	Sprint Race Brasil Guest Race		1	0	0	0	0	0	13th
2017	Campeonato Brasileiro de Turismo	W2 Racing	15	3	3	4	7	160	**2nd**
2018	Porsche GT3 Cup Brasil – Carrera Cup 3.8	Dener Motorsport	12	3	7	3	7	167	**2nd**
2018	Stock Light	Rsports Racing	2	0	0	0	1	27	20th
2018	Stock Car Brasil	HERO Motorsport	1	0	0	0	0	14	28th
2018	Porsche Endurance Series – 4.0		1	1	1	1	1	116	10th
2019	Stock Car Brasil	Shell Helix Ultra	21	0	0	0	0	112	19th
2019	Porsche Endurance Series – 3.8		1	1	1	0	1	116	11th
2020	Stock Car Brasil	Vogel Motorsport	11	0	0	0	0	104	20th
2020	Stock Car Brasil	KTF Sports	7	0	0	0	0	104	20th
2020	Porsche Endurance Series – GT3 Cup		3	1	0	1	1	166	5th
2021	Stock Car Pro Series	KTF Racing	24	0	0	0	2	161	18th
2021	Império Endurance Brasil – GT4L	Stillux Ginetta	5	2	5	2	2	270	**3rd**
2021	Porsche Endurance Series – Carrera Cup		3	0	0	1	0	78	15th
2021	OAKBERRY All-Star Race		1	0	0	0	0	NC	NC
2022	Stock Car Pro Series	KTF Sports	23	1	0	0	4	199	11th
2022	Império Endurance Brasil – P1	BTZ Motorsport	8	2	0	0	2	400	10th
2023	Stock Car Pro Series	Hot Car Competições	22	0	0	0	1	148	20th
2023	Império Endurance Brasil – P1	BTZ Motorsport	8	2	2	2	6	880	**1st**
2023	TCR South America Touring Car Championship	Squadra Martino	1	0	0	0	1	35	26th
2023	TCR Brazil Touring Car Championship	Squadra Martino	1	0	0	0	1	35	17th
2024	Stock Car Pro Series	Cavaleiro Sports	24	3	1	0	3	611	16th
2025	Stock Car Pro Series	Eurofarma RC	5	1	0	1	3	178*	**2nd***
2026	TCR South America Touring Car Championship	Hyundai N MSA							
2026	Porsche Carrera Cup Brasil								

* Season still in progress

=== Complete Sprint Race Brasil results ===
(key) (Races in bold indicate pole position) (Races in italics indicate fastest lap)

Year	1	2	3	4	5	6	7	8	9	10	11	12	13	14	15	16	DC	Points
2013	TAR; 1; 1	TAR; 2; 4	CUR1; 1 Ret	CUR1; 1; 1	LON; 1; 5	LON; 2; 3	CURO; 1; 2	CURO; 2 Ret	INT1; 1; 6	INT1; 2 Ret	CAS; 1; 2	CAS; 2; 1	CUR2; 1; 1	CUR2; 1; 1	INT1; 1; 4	INT1; 1; 3	1st	277
2015					**1**	Ret											11th	25

=== Complete BRDC Formula 4 Championship results ===
(key) (Races in bold indicate pole position) (Races in italics indicate fastest lap)

Year	Team	1	2	3	4	5	6	7	8	9	10	11	12	13	14	15	16	17	18	19	20	21	22	23	24	DC	Points
2014	Petroball Racing	SIL1; 1; 12	SIL1; 2 Ret	SIL1; 3; 12	BRH1; 1; 11	BRH1; 2; 16	BRH1; 3; 9	SNE1; 1; 14	SNE2; 2; 9	SNE3; 3; 5	OUL; 1; 12	OUL; 2; 11	OUL; 3; 6	SIL1; 1; 11	SIL2; 2; 2	SIL2; 3; 9	**BRH2**; **1**; 1	BRH2; 1 Ret	BRH2; 1; 2	DON; 1; 10	DON; 2; 9	DON; 3 DNS	SNE2; 1; 4	SNE2; 2; 6	SNE2; 3; 7	8th	301
2014 Winter	Petroball Racing	**SNE**; **1**; 2	SNE; 2; 2	**SNE**; **3**; 2	SNE; 4; 1	BRH; 1; 1	BRH; 2 Ret	BRH; 3; 3	BRH; 4; 3																	2nd	205

=== Complete Stock Light results ===
(key) (Races in bold indicate pole position) (Races in italics indicate fastest lap)

Year	Team	1	2	3	4	5	6	7	8	9	10	11	12	13	14	15	DC	Points
2017	W2 Racing	**GOI1**; **1**; 1	GOI1; 2; 3	VEL; 1; 13	VEL; 2; 2	SCS; 1; 11	SCS; 2; 8	CUR; 1; 6	**CUR**; **2**; 1	CRI; 1; 3	CRI; 2; 4	LON; 1 Ret	LON; 2 DSQ	GOI2; 1; 15	GOI2; 2; 3	**INT**; 1	2nd	160
2018	Rsports Racing	INT1; 1	INT1; 2	CUR; 1	CUR; 2	LON1; 1	LON1; 2	GOI; 1	GOI; 2	MS; 1; 3	MS; 2; 8	VCA; 1	VCA; 2	LON2; 1	LON2; 2	INT2	20th	27

Notes: In 2017, the championship was known as 'Campeonato Brasileiro de Turismo'.

=== Complete Porsche GT3 Cup Brasil results ===
(key) (Races in bold indicate pole position) (Races in italics indicate fastest lap)

Year	Team	1	2	3	4	5	6	7	8	9	10	11	12	DC	Points
2018	Dener Motorsport	CUR; 1; 18	CUR; 2; 18	**INT1**; **1**; 9	INT1; 2; 10	**INT2**; **1**; 10	INT2; 2; 13	**INT3**; **1**; 9	INT3; 2; 12	VEC; 1; 12	VEC; 2; 8	INT4; 1; 20	INT4; 2 Ret	2nd	167

=== Complete Stock Car Pro Series results ===
(key) (Races in bold indicate pole position) (Races in italics indicate fastest lap)

Year	Team	1	2	3	4	5	6	7	8	9	10	11	12	13	14	15	16	17	18	19	20	21	22	23	24	25	DC	Points
2018	RCM Motorsport	INT1	CUR; 1	CUR; 2	VEL; 1	VEL; 2	LON1; 1	LON1; 2	SCZ; 1	SCZ; 2	GOI1	MS; 1	MS; 2	CAS; 1	CAS; 2	VCA; 1	VCA; 2	LON2; 1	LON2; 2	GOI2; 1	GOI2; 2	INT2; 10					28th	14
2019	Full Time Bassani	VEL1; 14	VCA; 1; 13	VCA; 2; 10	GOI1; 1; 21	GOI1; 2; 13	LON; 1 Ret	LON; 2 Ret	SCZ; 1; 15	SCZ; 2 Ret	MS; 1; 4	MS; 2 Ret	INT1; 7	VEL2; 1; 18	VEL2; 2; 16	CAS; 1 Ret	CAS; 2 Ret	VCA; 1; 16	VCA; 2; 11	GOI2; 1 Ret	GOI2; 2; 6	INT2; Ret					19th	112
2020	Vogel Motorsport	GOI1; 1 Ret	GOI1; 2 Ret	INT1; 8	INT2; 16	LON; 1; 21	LON; 2; 6	CAS1 19	CAS2; 1 Ret	CAS2; 2; 4	VCA; 1 Ret	VCA; 2 Ret															20th	104
2020	KTF Sports												CUR1; Ret	CUR2; 1; 17	CUR2; 2 Ret	GOI2; 8	GOI3; 1; 6	GOI3; 2 Ret	INT3; 9								20th	104
2021	KTF Racing	GOI1; 1; 7	GOI1; 2; 2	INT1; 1; 27	INT1; 2 Ret	VCA1; 1; 20	VCA1; 2 Ret	VCA2; 1 Ret	VCA2; 2; 4	CAS; 1 Ret	CAS; 2; 8	CUR1; 1; 18	CUR1; 2; 2	CUR2; 1; 24	CUR2; 2 Ret	GOI2; 1; 9	GOI2; 2; 5	GOI3; 1; 16	GOI3; 2; 16	VCA3; 1; 7	VCA3; 2; 8	SCZ; 1; 26	SCZ; 2 Ret	INT2; 1 DSQ	INT2; 2; 13		18th	161
2022	KTF Sports	INT1; 6	GOI1; 1; 9	GOI1; 2; 7	RIO; 1 Ret	RIO; 2; 3	VCA1; 1; 13	VCA1; 2; 6	VEL1; 1; 17	VEL1; 2; 7	VEL2; 1; 1	VEL2; 2; 4	INT2; 1 Ret	INT2; 2; 18	VCA2; 1; 28	VCA2; 2; 3	SCZ; 1; 22	SCZ; 2; 13	GOI2; 1; 22	GOI2; 2; 22	GOI3; 1; 19	GOI3; 2; 2	INT3; 1; 23	INT3; 2; 20			11th	199
2023	Hot Car Competições	GOI1; 1 Ret	GOI1; 2; 4	INT1; 1; 4	INT1; 2; 3	TAR; 1; 14	TAR; 2; 19	CAS1; 1; 25	CAS1; 2 Ret	INT2; 1; 5	INT2; 2; 14	VCA1; 1; 25	VCA1; 2 DSQ	GOI2; 1; 9	GOI2; 2; 11	VEL; 1 Ret	VEL; 2 Ret	BUE; 1; 21	BUE; 2; 12	VCA2; 1 DNS	VCA2; 2; 17	CAS2; 1; 8	CAS2; 2; 5	INT3; 1	INT3; 2		20th	148
2024	Cavaleiro Sports	GOI1; 1; 16	GOI1; 2 Ret	VCA1; 1; 20	VCA1; 2 C	INT1; 1; 26	INT1; 2; 1	CAS; 1; 15	CAS; 2 Ret	VCA2; 1; 20	VCA2; 2; 1	VCA2; 3; 6	GOI2; 1; 10	GOI2; 2; 12	BLH; 1; 9	BLH; 2 Ret	VEL; 1; 13	VEL; 2; 17	BUE; 1 Ret	BUE; 1; 9	ELP; 1; 9	ELP; 2; 25†	GOI3; 1; 17	**GOI3**; **2**; 1	INT2; 1; 6	INT2; 2; 27†	16th	611
2025	Eurofarma RC	INT1; 2	CAS1; 1; 2	CAS1; 2 Ret	VEL; 1; 1	VEL; 2; 5	VCA1; 1	VCA1; 2	BLH; 1	BLH; 2	CAS2; 1	CAS2; 2	VCA2; 1	VCA2; 2	VCA3; 1	VCA3; 2	TBA	TBA	GOI; 1	GOI; 2	BRA; 1	BRA; 2	INT2; 1	INT2; 2			2nd*	178*

* Season still in progress
