= 2018 Porsche GT3 Cup Brasil =

14th season of Porsche Império GT3 Cup Challenge Brasil

The 2018 Porsche Império GT3 Cup Challenge Brasil is the first one-make Porsche racing championship in South America for 911 GT3 Cup cars and this was the fourteenth season. It began on March 24 at Autódromo Internacional de Curitiba and finished on November 11 at Autódromo José Carlos Pace. It was first held in 2005 and follows the same formula basis used in the Porsche Supercup and Porsche Carrera Cup championships held around the world.

== Drivers ==
All cars are overseen by the Dener Motorsport team. From the 2018 season, the Porsche 911 GT3 Cup (Type 991), will now have the new Porsche 911 Cup (Type 991.2), making the category to align to the same molds played in other countries, now being called Porsche Imperio Carrera Cup 4.0 and Porsche Imperio Carrera Cup 3.8 (Equivalent to category Cup series) and Porsche Imperio GT3 Cup 4.0 and Porsche Imperio GT3 Cup 3.8 (Equivalent to category Challenge series).

No.	Driver	Round
Carrera Cup 4.0
00	(Brazil) Constantino Jr.	1–5
7	(Brazil) Miguel Paludo	All
8	(Brazil) Werner Neugebauer	All
10	(Brazil) Daniel Schneider	2–3
13	(Brazil) Pedro Queirolo	All
22	(Brazil) Luca Seripieri	3–5
27	(Brazil) Ricardo Baptista	2–6
29	(Brazil) Rodrigo Mello	4
63	(Brazil) Lico Kaesemodel	All
88	(Brazil) Eduardo Rocha Azevedo	1
90	(Brazil) João Paulo Mauro	All
544	(Brazil) Marçal Müller	All
Carrera Cup 3.8
11	(Brazil) Gaetano di Mauro	All
19	(Brazil) Tom Filho	1
20	(Brazil) Pedrinho Aguiar	All
21	(Brazil) Eloi Khouri	All
29	(Brazil) Rodrigo Mello	1–3
31	(Brazil) William Starostik	1
32	(Brazil) Fernando Fortes	All
44	(Brazil) Bruno Baptista	All
55	(Panama) Marcus Vario	1–4
71	(Brazil) Raulino Kreis Jr.	1
73	(Brazil) Enzo Elias	All
77	(Brazil) Murilo Coletta	All
120	(Brazil) Vitor Baptista	All
177	(Brazil) Marcel Coletta	All
277	(Brazil) Matheu Coletta	All
GT3 Cup 4.0
4	(Brazil) Beto Leite	1
5	(Brazil) Sylvio de Barros	1–4
10	(Brazil) Adalbeto Baptista	1–4
11	(Brazil) Márcio Mauro	1–4
18	(Brazil) Carlos Ambrósio	1–3
19	(Brazil) Tom Filho	3–4
30	(Brazil) Bruno Garfinkel	4
31	(Brazil) Luca Seripieri	1–2
33	(France) Dominique Teysseyre	1–4
34	(Brazil) Maurizio Billi	1–4
37	(Brazil) Guilherme Reischl	1–4
50	(Brazil) Ramon Alcaraz	3–4
53	(Brazil) Rodolfo Toni	1–4
80	(Brazil) Rouman Ziemkiewicz	1–4
99	(Brazil) Tom Vale	1–4
GT3 Cup 3.8
7	(Brazil) Patrick Choate	1–4
8	(Brazil) Anderson Faita	3
14	(Brazil) André Gaidzinski	1–4
40	(Brazil) Alan Turres	2–3
45	(Brazil) Paulo Tortaro	1–4
50	(Brazil) Ramon Alcaraz	3
55	(Brazil) Alexandre Auler	1–3
71	(South Korea) Sangho Kim	1–3
77	(Brazil) Franscisco Horta	1–4
83	(Brazil) Marco Billi	1–4
87	(Brazil) Nelson Monteiro	1–3

== Race Calendar and Results ==
=== Carrera Cup ===
All races are scheduled to be held in Brazil.

Race	Circuit	Date	Pole position	Fastest lap	Winning driver	Winning 3.8
1	(Brazil) Autódromo Internacional de Curitiba, Curitiba	24 March	(Brazil) Lico Kaesemodel	(Brazil) Lico Kaesemodel	(Brazil) Marçal Müller	(Panama) Marcus Vario
2	(Brazil) Autódromo Internacional de Curitiba, Curitiba	24 March		(Brazil) Lico Kaesemodel	(Brazil) Werner Neugebauer	(Brazil) Vitor Baptista
3	(Brazil) Autódromo José Carlos Pace, São Paulo	14 April	(Brazil) Miguel Paludo	(Brazil) Miguel Paludo	(Brazil) Miguel Paludo	(Brazil) Gaetano di Mauro
4	(Brazil) Autódromo José Carlos Pace, São Paulo	14 April		(Brazil) Constantino Jr.	(Brazil) Constantino Jr.	(Brazil) Fernando Fortes
5	(Brazil) Autódromo José Carlos Pace, São Paulo	12 May	(Brazil) Werner Neugebauer	(Brazil) Ricardo Baptista	(Brazil) Werner Neugebauer	(Brazil) Gaetano di Mauro
6	(Brazil) Autódromo José Carlos Pace, São Paulo	12 May		(Brazil) Lico Kaesemodel	(Brazil) Lico Kaesemodel	(Brazil) Vitor Baptista
7	(Brazil) Autódromo José Carlos Pace, São Paulo	10 June	(Brazil) Lico Kaesemodel	(Brazil) Pedro Queirolo	(Brazil) Lico Kaesemodel	(Brazil) Vitor Baptista
8	(Brazil) Autódromo José Carlos Pace, São Paulo	10 June		(Brazil) Constantino Jr.	(Brazil) Constantino Jr.	(Brazil) Bruno Baptista
9	(Brazil) Autódromo Velo Città, Mogi Guaçu	15 September	(Brazil) Marçal Muller	(Brazil) Werner Neugebauer	(Brazil) Werner Neugebauer	(Brazil) Vitor Baptista
10	(Brazil) Autódromo Velo Città, Mogi Guaçu	15 September		(Brazil) Werner Neugebauer	(Brazil) Werner Neugebauer	(Brazil) Gaetano di Mauro
11	(Brazil) Autódromo José Carlos Pace, São Paulo	10 November	(Brazil) Miguel Paludo	(Brazil) Miguel Paludo	(Brazil) Miguel Paludo	(Brazil) Eloi Khouri
12	(Brazil) Autódromo José Carlos Pace, São Paulo	11 November		(Brazil) Ricardo Baptista	(Brazil) Ricardo Baptista	(Brazil) Bruno Baptista

=== GT3 Cup ===
All races are scheduled to be held in Brazil.

Race	Circuit, location	Date	Pole position	Fastest lap	Race winner	Winning 3.8
1	(Brazil) Autódromo Internacional de Curitiba, Curitiba	24 March	(Brazil) Sylvio de Barros	(Brazil) Tom Valle	(Brazil) Sylvio de Barros	(Brazil) Franscisco Horta
2	(Brazil) Autódromo Internacional de Curitiba, Curitiba	24 March		(Brazil) Sylvio de Barros	(Brazil) Sylvio de Barros	(Brazil) Marco Billi
3	(Brazil) Autódromo José Carlos Pace	14 April	(Brazil) Tom Valle	(Brazil) Sylvio de Barros	(Brazil) Sylvio de Barros	(Brazil) Paulo Tortaro
4	(Brazil) Autódromo José Carlos Pace	14 April		(Brazil) Tom Valle	(Brazil) Tom Valle	(Brazil) Alan Turres
5	(Brazil) Autódromo José Carlos Pace	12 May	(Brazil) Tom Filho	(Brazil) Tom Vale	(Brazil) Tom Filho	(Brazil) Nelson Monteiro
6	(Brazil) Autódromo José Carlos Pace	12 May		(Brazil) Tom Vale	(Brazil) Tom Vale	(Brazil) Nelson Monteiro
7	(Brazil) Autódromo José Carlos Pace	10 June	(Brazil) Tom Vale	(Brazil) Tom Vale	(Brazil) Adalbeto Baptista	(Brazil) Paulo Tortaro
8	(Brazil) Autódromo José Carlos Pace	10 June		(Brazil) Rouman Ziemkiewicz	(Brazil) Rouman Ziemkiewicz	(Brazil) Franscisco Horta
9	(Brazil) Autódromo Velo Città, Mogi Guaçu	15 September	(Brazil) Marcel Visconde	(Brazil) Adalbeto Baptista	(Brazil) Adalbeto Baptista	(Brazil) Nelson Monteiro
10	(Brazil) Autódromo Velo Città, Mogi Guaçu	15 September		(Brazil) Marcel Visconde	(Brazil) Marcel Visconde	(Brazil) Nelson Monteiro
11	(Brazil) Autódromo José Carlos Pace, São Paulo	10 November	(Brazil) Sylvio de Barros	(Brazil) Sylvio de Barros	(Brazil) Sylvio de Barros	(Brazil) Carlos Renaux
12	(Brazil) Autódromo José Carlos Pace, São Paulo	11 November		(Brazil) Tom Filho	(Brazil) Tom Filho	(Brazil) Franscisco Horta

== Drivers' Championship ==
Points are awarded for each race at an event to the driver/s of a car that completed at least 70% of the race distance and was running at the completion of the race. The sprint races has the partially top 6 reserve grid. Only the best 10 results in each series counts for the championship.

Points format	Position														
Points format	1st	2nd	3rd	4th	5th	6th	7th	8th	9th	10th	11th	12th	13th	14th	15th
Feature race	22	20	18	16	14	12	10	9	8	7	6	5	4	3	2
Reserve grid race	20	18	16	14	12	10	9	8	7	6	5	4	3	2	1

=== Carrera Cup ===
Pos	Driver	CUR		INT		INT		INT		VEC		INT (Note: On the last round of the season, Carrera Cup and Carrera Cup 3.8 competed separated.)		Pts
4.0
1	(Brazil) Werner Neugebauer	5	1	4	6	**1**	4	5	5	1	3	2	4	172 (194)
2	(Brazil) Miguel Paludo	Ret	4	**1**	5	5	3	2	4	4	1	**1**	DSQ	170
3	(Brazil) Lico Kaesemodel	**Ret**	Ret	2	3	4	1	**1**	2	3	6	7	2	168
4	(Brazil) Marçal Müller	1	2	8	8	2	6	Ret	6	**2**	2	3	12	154 (162)
5	(Brazil) Pedro Queirolo	2	3	Ret	7	6	7	3	3	5	12	6	3	142 (150)
6	(Brazil) Constantino Jr.	3	5	7	1	8	5	4	1	6	7			138
7	(Brazil) Ricardo Baptista			3	2	3	2	Ret	DNS	8	4	5	1	129
8	(Brazil) João Paulo Mauro	4	Ret	6	4	9	8	Ret	9	7	5	4	5	115
9	(Brazil) Daniel Schneider			5	DNS	7	9							33
10	(Brazil) Luca Seripieri					Ret	10	6	8					27
11	(Brazil) Eduardo Azevedo	Ret	DNS									9	7	19
12	(Brazil) Rodrigo Mello							7	7					18
3.8														Pts
1	(Brazil) Vitor Baptista	7	6	13	12	13	11	8	18	9	10	**6**	2	182 (193)
2	(Brazil) Gaetano di Mauro	18	18	**9**	10	**10**	13	**9**	12	12	8	20	Ret	167
3	(Brazil) Bruno Baptista	15	13	12	15	15	16	11	10	11	DSQ	2	1	141 (148)
4	(Brazil) Marcel Coletta	Ret	10	10	11	11	14	14	17	Ret	11	3	Ret	132
5	(Brazil) Murilo Coletta	**8**	7	16	Ret	Ret	15	10	15	13	9	Ret	4	131
6	(Brazil) Fernando Fortes	9	8	14	9	16	18	15	14	15	14	9	6	125
7	(Brazil) Enzo Elias	Ret	19	17	14	12	20	12	13	**10**	15	7	Ret	109
8	(Brazil) Eloi Khouri	13	15	15	Ret	Ret	19	13	11	14	17	1	5	108
9	(Panama) Marcus Vario	6	9	11	16	14	12	Ret	19					100
10	(Brazil) Matheus Coletta	17	14	20	17	18	Ret	17	Ret	16	13	5	3	90
11	(Brazil) Pedrinho Aguiar	11	18	18	13	17	18	16	16	Ret	16	4	Ret	89
12	(Brazil) Rodrigo Mello	12	16	19	18	Ret	Ret							27
13	(Brazil) Raulino Kreis Jr.	10	11											24
14	(Brazil) Tom Filho	14	17											12
15	(Brazil) William Starostik	16	20											7
Pos	Driver	CUR		INT		INT		TRH		VEC		INT		Pts

Colour	Result
Gold	Winner
Silver	Second place
Bronze	Third place
Green	Points classification
Blue	Non-points classification
Blue	Non-classified finish (NC)
Purple	Retired, not classified (Ret)
Red	Did not qualify (DNQ)
Red	Did not pre-qualify (DNPQ)
Black	Disqualified (DSQ)
White	Did not start (DNS)
White	Withdrew (WD)
White	Race cancelled (C)
Blank	Did not practice (DNP)
Blank	Did not arrive (DNA)
Blank	Excluded (EX)

**Bold** – Pole position
Italics – Fastest lap
† – Retired, but classified

=== GT3 Cup ===
Pos	Driver	CUR		INT		INT		INT		VEC	INT (Note: On the last round of the season, GT3 cup competed with Carrera Cup and GT3 Cup 3.8 raced with Carrera Cup 3.8.)	Pts
1	(Brazil) Sylvio de Barros	**1**	**1**	1	2	2	7	2	3	12		147
2	(Brazil) Adalberto Baptista	4	4	**12**	17	7	2	1	2	1		121
3	(Brazil) Maurizio Billi	3	2	Ret	3	3	10	4	Ret	Ret		92
4	(Brazil) Rouman Ziemkiewicz	Ret	12	Ret	5	6	6	5	1	Ret		75
5	(Brazil) Tom Valle	Ret	DNS	Ret	1	4	1	**6**	Ret			68
6	(Brazil) Guilherme Reischl	5	8	Ret	6	5	4	15	Ret	7		66
7	(Brazil) Tom Filho					**1**	5	3	5	Ret		64
8	(Brazil) Carlos Ambrósio	2	3	Ret	4	8	Ret			4		59
9	(France) Dominique Teysseyre	Ret	DNS	3	8	10	9	12	6	Ret		58
10	(Brazil) Rodolfo Toni	Ret	6	Ret	7	20	3	Ret	4	6		55
11	(Brazil) Márcio Mauro	6	Ret	2	Ret	19	8	8	DSQ	Ret		53
12	(Brazil) Luca Seripieri	Ret	5	11	18							32
13	(Brazil) Ramon Alcaraz					21	DNS	7	12			22
14	(Brazil) Bruno Garfinkel							9	8			17
3.8
1	(Brazil) Paulo Totaro	7	10	4	12	11	14	10	10			146
2	(Brazil) Francisco Horta	6	13	5	15	**14**	16	**11**	7			129
3	(Brazil) Patrick Choate	8	11	7	13	13	13	14	9			128
4	(Brazil) Marco Billi	**12**	9	Ret	11	12	12	13	11			114
5	(Brazil) André Gaidzinski	11	14	8	14	15	19	16	Ret			81
6	(Brazil) Nelson Monteiro	DNS	DNS	6	10	9	11					78
7	(South Korea) Sangho Kim	10	16	10	16	18	20					55
8	(Brazil) Alexandre Auler	9	15	**13**	Ret	16	17					54
9	(Brazil) Alan Turres			9	9	Ret	15					44
10	(Brazil) Anderson Faita					17	18					17
11	(Brazil) Ramon Alcaraz					DNS	21					55
Pos	Driver	CUR		INT		GOI		TRH		VEC	INT	Pts

Colour	Result
Gold	Winner
Silver	Second place
Bronze	Third place
Green	Points classification
Blue	Non-points classification
Blue	Non-classified finish (NC)
Purple	Retired, not classified (Ret)
Red	Did not qualify (DNQ)
Red	Did not pre-qualify (DNPQ)
Black	Disqualified (DSQ)
White	Did not start (DNS)
White	Withdrew (WD)
White	Race cancelled (C)
Blank	Did not practice (DNP)
Blank	Did not arrive (DNA)
Blank	Excluded (EX)

**Bold** – Pole position
Italics – Fastest lap
† – Retired, but classified
