= 2023 TCR Brazil Touring Car Championship =

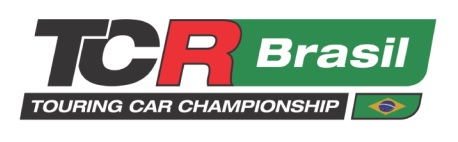
Official Logo

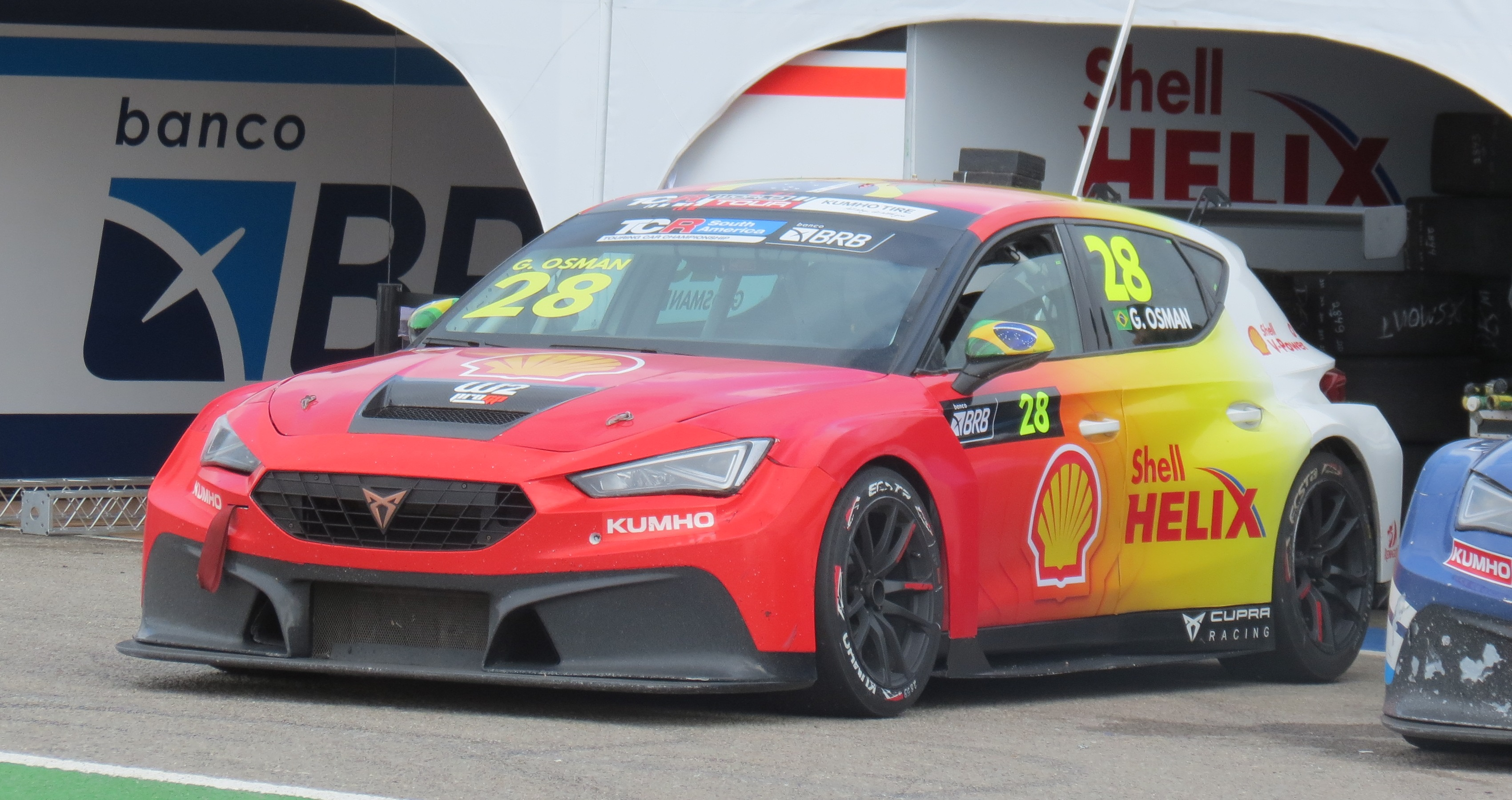
Galid Osman became the first TCR Brazil champion

The 2023 TCR Brazil Touring Car Championship was the first season of TCR Brazil Touring Car Championship.

Galid Osman won the drivers' championship, finishing by a point ahead of Ignacio Montenegro.

== Calendar ==
Race is an Endurance Event

Rnd.	Circuit/Location	Date
1	(Brazil) Autódromo José Carlos Pace, São Paulo	10–11 June
2	(Uruguay) Autódromo Eduardo Prudêncio Cabrera, Rivera	22–23 July
3	(Brazil) Velopark, Nova Santa Rita	23–24 September
4	(Brazil) Autódromo Velo Città, Mogi Guaçu	21–22 October
5	(Brazil) Autódromo Internacional de Cascavel, Cascavel	2–3 December

== Teams and drivers ==
Team	Car	No.	Drivers	Class	Rounds	Co-Driver name	Rounds
(Argentina) Paladini Racing	Toyota GR Corolla Sport TCR	2	(Argentina) Juan Ángel Rosso		All	(Argentina) Luciano Farroni	1
(Argentina) Paladini Racing	Toyota GR Corolla Sport TCR	5	(Argentina) Fabián Yannantuoni		All	(Brazil) Beto Monteiro	1
(Argentina) PMO Motorsport	Lynk & Co 03 TCR	3	(Brazil) Marcos Regadas	T	4	—N/a	
(Argentina) PMO Motorsport	Lynk & Co 03 TCR	8	(Brazil) Rafael Suzuki		All	(Argentina) Matías Signorelli	1
(Brazil) Cobra Racing Team	Toyota GR Corolla Sport TCR	10	(Brazil) Adalberto Baptista	T	All	(Brazil) Bruno Baptista	1
(Brazil) Cobra Racing Team	Toyota GR Corolla Sport TCR	70	(Brazil) Diego Nunes		All	(Brazil) Thiago Vivacqua	1
(Argentina) Squadra Martino	Honda Civic Type R TCR (FK8)	15	(Uruguay) Enrique Maglione	T	All	(Uruguay) Rodrigo Aramendía	1
(Argentina) Squadra Martino	Honda Civic Type R TCR (FK8)	23	(Argentina) Ignacio Montenegro		All	(Argentina) Lucas Colombo Russell	1
(Argentina) Squadra Martino	Honda Civic Type R TCR (FK8)	34	(Brazil) Fabio Casagrande	T	All	(Argentina) Franco Coscia	1
(Argentina) Squadra Martino	Honda Civic Type R TCR (FK8)	60	(Uruguay) Juan Manuel Casella		1–2	(Brazil) Gaetano di Mauro	1
(Argentina) Squadra Martino	Honda Civic Type R TCR (FL5)	60	(Uruguay) Juan Manuel Casella		3–5	(Brazil) Gaetano di Mauro	1
(Brazil) Scuderia Chiarelli	Hyundai Elantra N TCR	19	(Brazil) Felipe Papazissis		4	—N/a	
(Brazil) Scuderia Chiarelli	Hyundai Elantra N TCR	42	(Brazil) Fabiano Cardoso		3	—N/a	
(Brazil) Scuderia Chiarelli	Hyundai Elantra N TCR	43	(Brazil) Pedro Cardoso		All	(Brazil) Mathias de Valle	1
(Argentina) PMO Racing	Peugeot 308 TCR	21	(Brazil) Márcio Basso	T	5	—N/a	
(Argentina) PMO Racing	Peugeot 308 TCR	37	(Brazil) Guilherme Reischl	T	All	(Brazil) Guilherme Salas	1
(Argentina) PMO Racing	Peugeot 308 TCR	72	(Brazil) Lucas Salles	T	1	(Brazil) Marcos Regadas	1
(Brazil) W2 ProGP	CUPRA León Competición TCR	28	(Brazil) Galid Osman		All	(Brazil) Felipe Lapenna	1
(Brazil) W2 ProGP	CUPRA León Competición TCR	77	(Brazil) Raphael Reis		All	(Argentina) Jorge Barrio	1

Icon	Class
T	TCR Trophy

== Results and standings ==
=== Season summary ===
Rnd.		Circuit	Pole position	Fastest lap	Winning driver	Winning team	Winning Trophy driver
1	R1	(Brazil) Interlagos	(Argentina) Ignacio Montenegro (Argentina) Lucas Colombo Russell	(Brazil) Guilherme Salas	(Brazil) Galid Osman (Brazil) Felipe Lapenna	(Brazil) W2 ProGP	(Brazil) Adalberto Baptista
2	R2	(Uruguay) Rivera	(Argentina) Ignacio Montenegro	(Uruguay) Juan Manuel Casella	(Argentina) Ignacio Montenegro	(Argentina) Squadra Martino	(Brazil) Fabio Casagrande
2	R3	(Uruguay) Rivera		(Brazil) Rafael Suzuki	(Brazil) Rafael Suzuki	(Argentina) PMO Motorsport	(Uruguay) Enrique Maglione
3	R4	(Brazil) Velopark	(Argentina) Ignacio Montenegro	(Brazil) Raphael Reis	(Argentina) Ignacio Montenegro	(Argentina) Squadra Martino	(Uruguay) Enrique Maglione
3	R5	(Brazil) Velopark		(Brazil) Diego Nunes	(Argentina) Fabián Yannantuoni	(Argentina) Paladini Racing	(Brazil) Adalberto Baptista
4	R6	(Brazil) Velo Città	(Brazil) Raphael Reis	(Argentina) Juan Ángel Rosso	(Brazil) Galid Osman	(Brazil) W2 ProGP	(Brazil) Marcos Regadas
4	R7	(Brazil) Velo Città		(Brazil) Raphael Reis	(Brazil) Diego Nunes	(Brazil) Cobra Racing Team	(Brazil) Marcos Regadas
4	R8	(Brazil) Velo Città		(Brazil) Galid Osman	(Brazil) Raphael Reis	(Brazil) W2 ProGP	(Brazil) Guilherme Reischl
4	R9	(Brazil) Velo Città		(Brazil) Raphael Reis	(Brazil) Galid Osman	(Brazil) W2 ProGP	(Brazil) Marcos Regadas
5	R10	(Brazil) Cascavel	(Uruguay) Juan Manuel Casella	(Brazil) Rafael Suzuki	(Brazil) Rafael Suzuki	(Argentina) PMO Motorsport	(Brazil) Fabio Casagrande
5	R11	(Brazil) Cascavel		(Brazil) Diego Nunes	(Brazil) Diego Nunes	(Brazil) Cobra Racing Team	(Brazil) Márcio Basso

== Championship standings ==
Scoring system

Position	1st	2nd	3rd	4th	5th	6th	7th	8th	9th	10th	11th	12th	13th	14th	15th
Qualifying	10	7	5	4	3	2	1	—N/a							
Endurance	40	35	30	27	24	21	18	15	13	11	9	7	5	3	1
Races 2-5	35	30	27	24	21	18	15	13	11	9	7	5	3	2	1

=== Drivers' Championship ===
Overall

Pos.	Driver	INT (Brazil)	RIV (Uruguay)		VLP (Brazil)		VEL (Brazil)				CAS (Brazil)		Pts.
Pos.	Driver	EDC	RD1	RD2	RD1	RD2	RD1	RD2	RD3	RD4	RD1	RD2	Pts.
1	(Brazil) Galid Osman	1^{2}	9^{3}	Ret	7	8	1^{3}	2	13†	1	2^{3}	4	262
2	(Argentina) Ignacio Montenegro	13†^{1}	1^{1}	3	1^{1}	7	2^{4}	Ret	4	Ret	6^{5}	7	261
3	(Brazil) Raphael Reis	2^{5}	3^{4}	4	8^{7}	3	3^{1}	4	1	13†	5	5	259
4	(Argentina) Juan Ángel Rosso	4^{6}	Ret	6	3^{4}	2	11^{6}	3	2	3	3^{6}	2	248
5	(Brazil) Rafael Suzuki	10	DSQ^{6}	1	2^{2}	6	5^{2}	13†	7	5	1^{2}	6	221
6	(Argentina) Fabián Yannantuoni	5	Ret	5	5	1	4	7	5	Ret	4^{4}	3	213
7	(Brazil) Diego Nunes	8^{7}	4^{7}	9	6	4	7	1	6	7	Ret^{7}	1	184
8	(Brazil) Pedro Cardoso	6	2^{2}	7	Ret^{5}	5	13†^{5}	5	3	2	8	Ret	168
9	(Uruguay) Juan Manuel Casella	3^{3}	6^{5}	2	4^{3}	9	6	Ret	8	8	Ret^{1}	DNS	167
10	(Brazil) Fabio Casagrande	9	5	10	Ret	14	DNS^{7}	DNS	11	6	7	10	104
11	(Brazil) Guilherme Reischl	Ret^{4}	7	12†	12	13	14†	9	9	11†	9	11	85
12	(Brazil) Adalberto Baptista	7	8	11	11	11	9	Ret	12	Ret	12	12†	81
13	(Brazil) Marcos Regadas	11					8	6	10	4			77
14	(Uruguay) Enrique Maglione	12	DSQ	8	10^{7}	12	12†	8	Ret	9	11	9	77
15	(Brazil) Felipe Lapenna	1^{2}											47
16	(Argentina) Jorge Barrio	2^{5}											38
17	(Brazil) Gaetano di Mauro	3^{3}											35
18	(Brazil) Fabiano Cardoso				9	5							34
19	(Argentina) Luciano Farroni	4^{6}											29
20	(Brazil) Beto Monteiro	5											24
21	(Brazil) Márcio Basso										10	8	24
22	(Brazil) Mathias de Valle	6											21
23	(Brazil) Felipe Papazissis						10	10	DNS	DNS			20
24	(Brazil) Bruno Baptista	7											18
25	(Brazil) Thiago Vivacqua	8^{7}											16
26	(Argentina) Lucas Colombo Russell	13†^{1}											15
27	(Argentina) Franco Coscia	9											13
28	(Argentina) Matías Signorelli	10											11
29	(Brazil) Lucas Salles	11											9
30	(Uruguay) Rodrigo Aramendía	12											7
31	(Brazil) Guilherme Salas	Ret^{4}											4
Pos.	Driver	INT (Brazil)	RIV (Uruguay)		VLP (Brazil)		VEL (Brazil)				CAS (Brazil)		Pts.

Colour	Result
Gold	Winner
Silver	Second place
Bronze	Third place
Green	Points classification
Blue	Non-points classification
Blue	Non-classified finish (NC)
Purple	Retired, not classified (Ret)
Red	Did not qualify (DNQ)
Red	Did not pre-qualify (DNPQ)
Black	Disqualified (DSQ)
White	Did not start (DNS)
White	Withdrew (WD)
White	Race cancelled (C)
Blank	Did not practice (DNP)
Blank	Did not arrive (DNA)
Blank	Excluded (EX)

^{1} ^{2} ^{3} ^{4} ^{5} ^{6} ^{7} – Points-scoring position in qualifying, not including World Tour entries

† – Drivers did not finish the race, but were classified as they completed over 75% of the race distance.

Trophy Cup

Pos.	Driver	INT (Brazil)	RIV (Uruguay)		VLP (Brazil)		VEL (Brazil)				CAS (Brazil)		Pts.
Pos.	Driver	EDC	RD1	RD2	RD1	RD2	RD1	RD2	RD3	RD4	RD1	RD2	Pts.
1	(Brazil) Guilherme Reischl	Ret^{1}	2^{3}	4†	3^{4}	3	4†^{2}	3	1	4†	2^{2}	4	333
2	(Uruguay) Enrique Maglione	4^{4}	DSQ^{1}	1	1^{1}	2	3†^{5}	2	Ret	3	4^{4}	2	310
3	(Brazil) Fabio Casagrande	2^{5}	1^{2}	2	Ret^{2}	4	DNS^{1}	DNS	3	2	1^{1}	3	303
4	(Brazil) Adalberto Baptista	1^{3}	3^{4}	3	2^{3}	1	2^{4}	Ret	4	Ret	5^{5}	5†	299
5	(Brazil) Marcos Regadas						1^{3}	1	2	1			155
6	(Brazil) Márcio Basso										3^{3}	2	70
7	(Brazil) Lucas Salles	3^{2}											37
Pos.	Driver	INT (Brazil)	RIV (Uruguay)		VLP (Brazil)		VEL (Brazil)				CAS (Brazil)		Pts.

Colour	Result
Gold	Winner
Silver	Second place
Bronze	Third place
Green	Points classification
Blue	Non-points classification
Blue	Non-classified finish (NC)
Purple	Retired, not classified (Ret)
Red	Did not qualify (DNQ)
Red	Did not pre-qualify (DNPQ)
Black	Disqualified (DSQ)
White	Did not start (DNS)
White	Withdrew (WD)
White	Race cancelled (C)
Blank	Did not practice (DNP)
Blank	Did not arrive (DNA)
Blank	Excluded (EX)

^{1} ^{2} ^{3} ^{4} ^{5} ^{6} ^{7} – Points-scoring position in qualifying.

† – Drivers did not finish the race, but were classified as they completed over 75% of the race distance.

=== Teams' Championship ===
Pos.	Team	No.	INT (Brazil)	RIV (Uruguay)		VLP (Brazil)		VEL (Brazil)				CAS (Brazil)		Pts.
Pos.	Team	No.	EDC	RD1	RD2	RD1	RD2	RD1	RD2	RD3	RD4	RD1	RD2	Pts.
1	(Brazil) W2 ProGP	28	1^{2}	9^{3}	Ret	7	8	1^{3}	2	13†	1	2^{3}	4	587
1	(Brazil) W2 ProGP	77	2	Ret	Ret	8	8	3	4	13†	10†			587
2	(Argentina) Paladini Racing	2	4^{6}	Ret	6	3^{4}	2	11^{6}	3	2	3	3^{6}	2	503
2	(Argentina) Paladini Racing	5	5	Ret	5	5	1	4	7	5	Ret	4^{4}	3	503
3	(Argentina) Squadra Martino	23	13†^{1}	1^{1}	3	1^{1}	7	2^{4}	Ret	4	Ret	6^{5}	7	408
3	(Argentina) Squadra Martino	60	3^{3}	6^{5}	2	4^{3}	9	6	Ret	8	8	Ret^{1}	DNS	408
4	(Argentina) PMO Motorsport	3						8	6	10	4			325
4	(Argentina) PMO Motorsport	8	10	DSQ^{6}	1	2^{2}	6	5^{2}	13†	7	5	1^{2}	6	325
5	(Brazil) Cobra Racing Team	10	7	8	11	11	11	9	Ret	12	Ret	12	12†	313
5	(Brazil) Cobra Racing Team	70	8^{7}	4^{7}	9	6	4	7	1	6	7	Ret^{7}	1	313
6	(Brazil) Scuderia Chiarelli	19						10	10	DNS	DNS			251
6	(Brazil) Scuderia Chiarelli	42				9	5							251
6	(Brazil) Scuderia Chiarelli	43	6	2^{2}	7	Ret^{5}	5	13†^{5}	5	3	2	8	Ret	251
7	(Argentina) PMO Racing	21										10	8	124
7	(Argentina) PMO Racing	37	Ret^{4}	7	12†	12	13	14†	9	9	11†	9	11	124
7	(Argentina) PMO Racing	72	11											124
Pos.	Team	No.	INT (Brazil)	RIV (Uruguay)		VLP (Brazil)		VEL (Brazil)				CAS (Brazil)		Pts.

Colour	Result
Gold	Winner
Silver	Second place
Bronze	Third place
Green	Points classification
Blue	Non-points classification
Blue	Non-classified finish (NC)
Purple	Retired, not classified (Ret)
Red	Did not qualify (DNQ)
Red	Did not pre-qualify (DNPQ)
Black	Disqualified (DSQ)
White	Did not start (DNS)
White	Withdrew (WD)
White	Race cancelled (C)
Blank	Did not practice (DNP)
Blank	Did not arrive (DNA)
Blank	Excluded (EX)

^{1} ^{2} ^{3} ^{4} ^{5} ^{6} ^{7} – Points-scoring position in qualifying, not including World Tour entries

== See also ==
- List of TCR Series
- Production car racing
- Stock car racing
- Stock Car Pro Series
- SuperBike Brasil
- Moto 1000 GP
