= César Ramos (racing driver) =

Brazilian racing driver

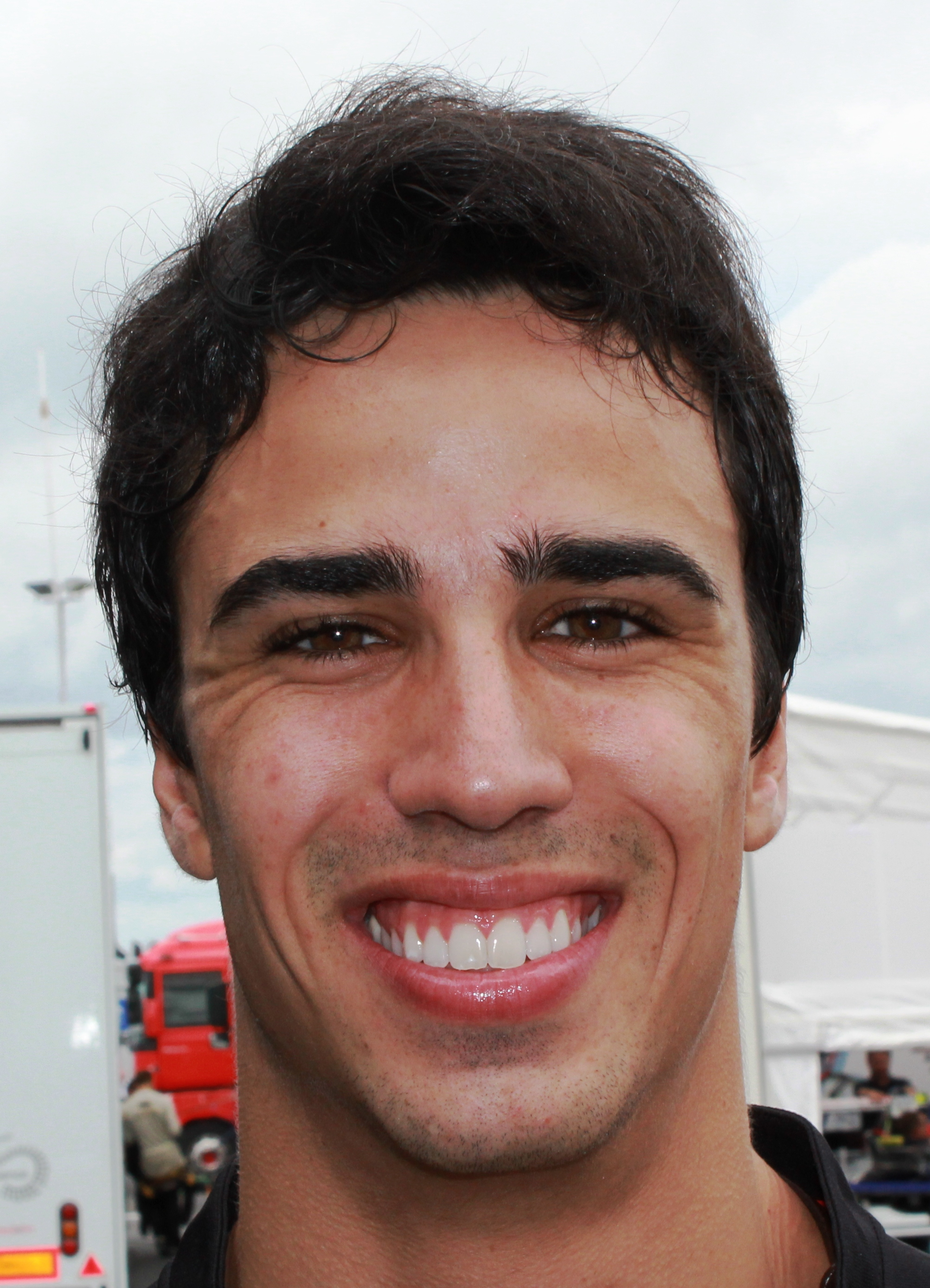
- Ramos in 2012.
- Nationality: (Brazil) Brazilian
- Born: César Altair Zanetti Ramos; 25 July 1989 (age 37) Novo Hamburgo (Brazil)

Stock Car Pro Series career
- Debut season: 2015
- Current team: Ipiranga Racing

Formula Renault 3.5 Series
- Categorisation: FIA Gold (until 2026); FIA Silver (2027–)
- Car number: 11
- Former teams: Fortec Motorsports
- Starts: 21
- Wins: 0
- Poles: 3
- Fastest laps: 0
- Best finish: 11th in 2011

Previous series
- 2018–2021 2011-2012 2010 2009 2007–08 2007–08 2007: Império Endurance Brasil; Formula Renault 3.5; Italian Formula Three; Formula 3 Euro Series; Eurocup Formula Renault 2.0; Formula Renault 2.0 Italy; FR2.0 Italy Winter Series

Championship titles
- 2010 2007: Italian Formula Three; FR2.0 Italy Winter Series

César Altair Zanetti Ramos (born 25 July 1989 in Novo Hamburgo) is a Brazilian racing driver currently competing in the Stock Car Pro Series with Ipiranga Racing. Ramos has also previously raced in Formula Renault, Italian Formula Three, Blancpain GT, Endurance Brasil, and GT Sprint Race.

== Career ==
=== Formula Renault 2.0 ===
Ramos began his car racing career by driving in the Italian Formula Renault Championship with the BVM Minardi team in 2007. He finished 14th in the standings, taking nine points–scoring positions in fourteen races, including a podium in the final race of the season at Monza. He also contested six races of the Eurocup Formula Renault 2.0 season for the same team. Ramos continued his progress in the Italian series, by committing to a Winter Series campaign. He claimed four wins, pole positions and fastest laps en route to a comfortable championship title.

The following season, Ramos competed in both the Eurocup and Formula Renault 2.0 Italy championships for BVM Minardi. He finished seventh in the Eurocup standings, taking seven points–scoring positions in fourteen races, including a podium in the second race of the season at Spa–Francorchamps. In the Italian series, he took sixth place in the championship, scoring four podium places.

=== Formula Three ===
Ramos moved to Manor Motorsport and the Formula 3 Euro Series in 2009, but left the series after the Barcelona round, eventually winding up 25th in the championship standings.

2010 saw Ramos move to the Italian Formula Three Championship with the BVM–Target Racing team. After securing three race wins and eight podium places, he won the title at the final round of the season in Monza, finishing eight points ahead of Stéphane Richelmi.

Ramos, along with Richelmi and Andrea Caldarelli, tested a Ferrari F2008 Formula One car as a prize for finishing in the top three in the championship, with the test taking place at Vallelunga on Thursday 2 December. After completing 30 laps, Ramos finished second fastest behind Caldarelli with a best lap time of 1:17.10.

=== Formula Renault 3.5 Series ===
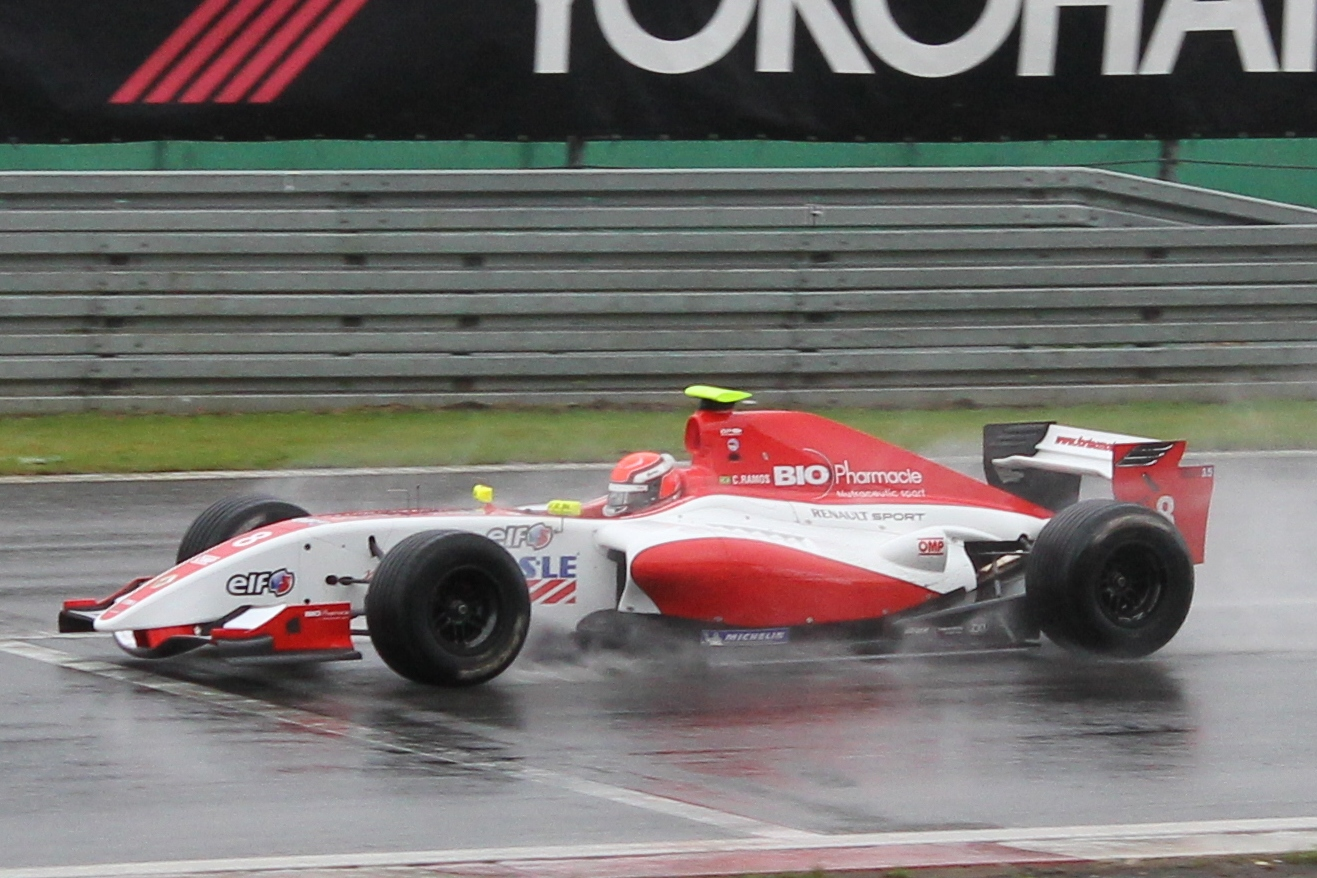
César Ramos at the 2011 Nürburgring World series by Renault round

After taking part in post–season Formula Renault 3.5 Series testing, Ramos would graduate to the championship in 2011, joining Alexander Rossi at Fortec Motorsport.

In June 2012, the New Zealand Lotus Team driver Richie Stanaway crashed heavily during a race at Spa Francorchamps and Ramos has taken his race seat until Stanaway's recovery is complete.

=== GT Racing ===
Ramos competed in the 2013 Blancpain Endurance Series season for Kessel Racing, driving alongside Daniel Zampieri and Davide Rigon for the full five-race series. The trio won the opening round at Monza Circuit on 14 April, and ended up finishing fourth in the championship. Ramos later signed with Belgian Audi Club WRT in the Blancpain Endurance Series, co-driving with Marc Basseng and Laurens Vanthoor.

Notably, Ramos, driving alongside Daniel Zampieri and Michał Broniszewski, finished third in the 2013 Gulf 12 Hours.

=== Other Series ===
In December 2010, Ramos took part in the second pre–season FIA Formula Two Championship test in Barcelona, finishing fourth fastest on day one before improving to third overall on the second day, setting a fastest session time in the process.

== Racing record ==
=== Career summary ===
Season	Series	Team	Races	Wins	Poles	F/Laps	Podiums	Points	Position
2006	Formula São Paulo	Alpie	1	0	0	0	0	4	18th
2006	Formula Renault 1.6 Argentina	N/A	1	0	0	0	0	1	69th
2007	Eurocup Formula Renault 2.0	BVM Minardi Team	6	0	0	0	0	N/A	NC†
2007	Formula Renault 2.0 Italia	BVM Minardi Team	14	0	0	0	1	106	14th
2007	Formula Renault 2.0 Italia – Winter Series	BVM Minardi Team	4	4	4	4	4	144	**1st**
2008	Eurocup Formula Renault 2.0	BVM Minardi Team	14	0	0	0	1	38	7th
2008	Formula Renault 2.0 Italia	BVM Minardi Team	14	0	1	2	4	216	6th
2009	Formula 3 Euro Series	Manor Motorsport	16	0	0	0	0	0	25th
2009	Masters of Formula 3	Manor Motorsport	1	0	0	0	0	N/A	28th
2010	Italian Formula Three Championship	BVM – Target Racing	16	3	2	7	8	161	**1st**
2011	Formula Renault 3.5 Series	Fortec Motorsports	17	0	2	0	0	47	11th
2012	Formula Renault 3.5 Series	Lotus	4	0	0	0	0	0	30th
2012	International GT Open	Kessel Racing	4	0	0	0	0	0	NC
2013	Blancpain Endurance Series	Kessel Racing	5	1	0	0	1	50	4th
2013	International GT Open	Kessel Racing	2	0	0	0	0	6	27th
2014	Stock Car Brasil	Ipiranga-RCM	1	0	0	0	0	0	NC
2014	Blancpain Endurance Series	Belgian Audi Club Team WRT	4	1	0	0	2	64	4th
2014	Blancpain GT Sprint Series	Belgian Audi Club Team WRT	14	5	0	1	7	100	4th
2015	Stock Car Brasil	Cavaleiro Racing	21	0	0	0	0	66	22nd
2016	Stock Car Brasil	RZ Motorsport	6	0	0	0	0	0	37th
2017	Stock Car Brasil	Blau Motorsport	22	0	0	0	0	70	21st
2018	Stock Car Brasil	Blau Motorsport	20	0	0	0	0	74	13th
2018	Campeonato Gaúcho de Superturismo – GT	JLM Racing	1	0	0	0	0	0	NC
2018	Dopamina Endurance Brasil – P1	JLM Racing	2	1	1	1	1	240	13th
2019	Stock Car Brasil	Blau Motorsport	21	0	0	1	1	103	22nd
2019	Imperio Endurance Brasil – GT4	N/A	1	0	0	0	0	0	NC
2019	Porsche Cup Brasil	N/A	1	0	0	0	1	0	NC
2019	Porsche Endurance Series	N/A	3	0	0	1	1	160	4th
2020	Stock Car Brasil	Ipiranga Racing	18	0	1	0	2	237	5th
2020	Imperio Endurance Brasil – GT4	MC Tubarão	1	0	0	0	0	0	NC
2020	Império Endurance Brasil – GT4L	MC Tubarão	1	0	1	0	0	0	NC
2020	Porsche Endurance Series	N/A	3	0	0	2	2	205	**2nd**
2021	Stock Car Pro Series	Ipiranga Racing	24	0	0	0	5	245	9th
2021	Império Endurance Brasil – GT3	Mattheis Motorsport	1	0	0	0	1	150	10th
2021	Porsche Endurance Series	N/A	2	0	0	0	0	72	17th
2021	GT Sprint Race Special Edition – Pro	N/A	6	1	0	0	3	95	9th
2022	Stock Car Pro Series	Ipiranga Racing	1	0	0	0	0	8	13th
2026	Porsche Carrera Cup Brasil								

† – As Ramos was a guest driver, he was ineligible for championship points.

=== Complete Eurocup Formula Renault 2.0 results ===
(key) (Races in bold indicate pole position; races in italics indicate fastest lap)

Year	Entrant	1	2	3	4	5	6	7	8	9	10	11	12	13	14	DC	Points
2007	BVM Minardi Team	ZOL; 1	ZOL; 2	NÜR; 1	NÜR; 2	HUN; 1	HUN; 2	DON; 1 Ret	DON; 2; 24†	MAG; 1; 24	MAG; 2; 31†	EST; 1; 18	EST; 2; 18	CAT; 1	CAT; 2	35th	0
2008	BVM Minardi Team	SPA; 1; 6	SPA; 2; 2	SIL; 1; 24	SIL; 2 Ret	HUN; 1; 5	HUN; 2; 9	NÜR; 1; 25	NÜR; 2; 10	LMS; 1; 4	LMS; 2; 7	EST; 1; 18	EST; 2 Ret	CAT; 1 Ret	CAT; 2; 11	7th	38

=== Complete Formula 3 Euro Series results ===
(key)

Year	Entrant	Chassis	Engine	1	2	3	4	5	6	7	8	9	10	11	12	13	14	15	16	17	18	19	20	DC	Points
2009	Manor Motorsport	Dallara F308/046	Mercedes	HOC; 1; 24	HOC; 2 Ret	LAU; 1; 17	LAU; 2 Ret	NOR; 1; 16	NOR; 2; 10	ZAN; 1; 17	ZAN; 2; 13	OSC; 1; 24	OSC; 2; 15	NÜR; 1; 12	NÜR; 2; 13	BRH; 1; 11	BRH; 2 Ret	CAT; 1 Ret	CAT; 2; 16	DIJ; 1	DIJ; 2	HOC; 1	HOC; 2	25th	0

=== Complete Formula Renault 3.5 Series results ===
(key) (Races in bold indicate pole position) (Races in italics indicate fastest lap)

Year	Team	1	2	3	4	5	6	7	8	9	10	11	12	13	14	15	16	17	Pos	Points
2011	Fortec Motorsports	ALC; 1; 23	**ALC**; **2**; 4	SPA; 1; 13	SPA; 2 Ret	**MNZ**; **1** Ret	MNZ; 2; 4	MON; 1; 20	NÜR; 1; 4	NÜR; 2; 8	HUN; 1; 10	HUN; 2; 24	SIL; 1 Ret	SIL; 2 DSQ	LEC; 1; 8	LEC; 2; 9	CAT; 1 Ret	CAT; 2 Ret	11th	47
2012	Lotus	ALC; 1	ALC; 2	MON; 1	SPA; 1	SPA; 2	NÜR; 1; 12	NÜR; 2 Ret	MOS; 1 Ret	MOS; 2 Ret	SIL; 1	SIL; 2	HUN; 1	HUN; 2	LEC; 1	LEC; 2	CAT; 1	CAT; 2	30th	0

=== Stock Car Brasil ===
Stock Car Brasil results
Year	Team	Car	1	2	3	4	5	6	7	8	9	10	11	12	13	14	15	16	17	18	19	20	21	22	23	24	Rank	Points
2014	Ipiranga-RCM	Chevrolet Sonic	INT; 1; 12	SCZ; 1	SCZ; 2	BRA; 1	BRA; 2	GOI; 1	GOI; 2	GOI; 1	CAS; 1	CAS; 2	CUR; 1	CUR; 2	VEL; 1	VEL; 2	SCZ; 1	SCZ; 2	TAR; 1	TAR; 2	SAL; 1	SAL; 2	CUR; 1				NC†	0†
2015	Cavaleiro Sports	Peugeot 408	GOI; 1 Ret	RBP; 1 Ret	RBP; 2 Ret	VEL; 1 Ret	VEL; 2 DNS	CUR; 1; 18	CUR; 2; 7	SCZ; 1; 22	SCZ; 2; 8	CUR; 1 Ret	CUR; 2 DNS	GOI; 1; 12	CAS; 1; 17	CAS; 2; 16	MOU; 1 Ret	MOU; 2 Ret	CUR; 1; 20	CUR; 2; 12	TAR; 1 Ret	TAR; 2; 8	INT; 1; 9				22nd	66
2016	RZ Motorsport	Chevrolet Cruze	CUR; 1 Ret	VEL; 1 Ret	VEL; 2 DNS	GOI; 1	GOI; 2	SCZ; 1	SCZ; 2	TAR; 1	TAR; 2	CAS; 1 Ret	CAS; 2 Ret	INT; 1; 21†	LON; 1	LON; 2	CUR; 1	CUR; 2	GOI; 1	GOI; 2	CRI; 1	CRI; 2	INT; 1				NC	0
2017	Blau Motorsport	Chevrolet Cruze	GOI; 1; 9	GOI; 2 Ret	VEL; 1 Ret	VEL; 2 DNS	SCZ; 1; 23	SCZ; 2; 10	CAS; 1; 13	CAS; 2; 14	CUR; 1; 7	CRI; 1; 25	CRI; 2 Ret	VCA; 1 Ret	VCA; 2; 7	LON; 1; 18	LON; 2; 17	ARG; 1; 15	ARG; 2; 9	TAR; 1; 21	TAR; 2 Ret	GOI; 1 Ret	GOI; 2; 13	INT; 1; 25			23rd	70
2018	Blau Motorsport	Chevrolet Cruze	INT; 1; 3	CUR; 1; 8	CUR; 2 Ret	VEL; 1 Ret	VEL; 2; 19	LON; 1 Ret	LON; 2 Ret	SCZ; 1; 7	SCZ; 2; 7	GOI; 1 DSQ	MOU; 1; 5	MOU; 2 Ret	CAS; 1 Ret	CAS; 2 DNS	VCA; 1 Ret	VCA; 2; 22	TAR; 1; 12	TAR; 2 Ret	GOI; 1; 9	**GOI**; **2** Ret	INT; 1; 18				13th	74
2019	Blau Motorsport	Chevrolet Cruze	VEL; 1; 8	VCA; 1 Ret	VCA; 2; 7	GOI; 1 Ret	GOI; 2 Ret	LON; 1; 12	LON; 2 Ret	SCZ; 1; 14	SCZ; 2 Ret	MOU; 1 Ret	MOU; 2 Ret	INT; 1; 17	VEL; 1 Ret	VEL; 2; 10	CAS; 1; 18	CAS; 2 Ret	VCA; 1; 7	VCA; 2 Ret	GOI; 1; 2	GOI; 2 Ret	INT; 1 Ret				22nd	103
2020	Ipiranga Racing	Toyota Corolla	GOI; 1; 8	GOI; 2; 8	INT; 1; 2	INT; 2; 2	LON; 1; 4	LON; 2 Ret	CAS; 1; 5	CAS; 2; 4	CAS; 3; 8	VCA; 1; 4	VCA; 2; 14	CUR; 1; 13	CUR; 2; 16	CUR; 3; 18	GOI; 1; 13	GOI; 2; 15	GOI; 3; 12	INT; 1; 5							5th	237
2021	Ipiranga Racing	Toyota Corolla	GOI; 1; 3	GOI; 2; 8	INT; 4	INT; 2; 11	VCA; 1; 5	VCA; 2; 12	VCA; 1; 13	VCA; 2; 3	CAS; 1; 2	CAS; 2; 16	CUR; 1; 7	CUR; 2; 21	CUR; 1 Ret	CUR; 2; 14	GOI; 1; 2	GOI; 2 Ret	GOI; 1; 7	GOI; 2; 14	VCA; 1; 3	VCA; 2 Ret	SCZ; 1; 19	SCZ; 2; 19	INT; 1; 23	INT; 2 Ret	9th	245
2022	Ipiranga Racing	Toyota Corolla	INT; 1; 12	GOI; 1; 2	GOI; 2; 10	RIO; 1; 5	RIO; 2 Ret	VCA; 1 Ret	VCA; 2 DNS	VEL; 1; 3	VEL; 2; 15	VEL; 1; 2	VEL; 2; 13	INT; 1	INT; 2	SCZ; 1	SCZ; 2	VCA; 1	VCA; 2	GOI; 1	GOI; 2	GOI; 1	GOI; 2	BRA; 1	BRA; 2		7th	127

Sporting positions
Preceded by Jaime Alguersuari	Italian Formula Renault 2.0; Winter Series; Champion; 2007	Succeeded by Daniel Mancinelli
Preceded by Daniel Zampieri	Italian Formula Three; Champion; 2010	Succeeded by Sergio Campana
