= 2017 Campeonato Brasileiro de Turismo season =

Car racing competition

The 2017 Agua da Serra Campeonato Brasileiro de Turismo (Brazilian Touring Championship), also known as Stock Car Brasil Light, was the fifth season of the Campeonato Brasileiro de Turismo, a second-tier series to Stock Car Brasil.

Gabriel Robe finished the season as the champion.

== Teams and drivers ==
- All cars were powered by V8 engines and used the JL chassis. All drivers were Brazilian-registered.

Team	No.	Driver	Rounds
W2 Racing	1	Lukas Moraes	6
W2 Racing	6	Raphael Abatte	8
W2 Racing	11	Gaetano Di Mauro	All
W2 Racing	77	Raphael Reis	1–5, 7
Full Time Academy	7	Giulio Borlenghi	All
Full Time Academy	120	Vitor Baptista	1, 4–8
Nascar Motorsport	1	Lukas Moraes	4, 7–8
Nascar Motorsport	8	Dudu Trausino	1–3
Nascar Motorsport	13	Raphael Campos	3–4, 7
Nascar Motorsport	22	Gariel Lusquinos	8
Nascar Motorsport	72	Fabio Fogaça	1, 7
RSport	5	Leandro Romera	5
RSport	22	Vinicius Margiota	6
RSport	23	Marco Cozzi	All
RSport	45	Giuseppe Vecci	7
RSport	58	João Rosate	8
RSport	84	Fernando Croce	1, 3
RSport	555	Renato Braga	4
RKL Competições	17	Pietro Rimbano	All
RKL Competições	86	Gustavo Frigotto	All
Motortech Competições	19	Matheus Muniz	All
Motortech Competições	35	Gabriel Robe	All
L3 Motorsport	33	Antonio Matiazzi	2–4, 6–8
L3 Motorsport	78	Lucas Peres	2–8
Motorsport	46	Tuca Antoniazzi	All
MRF Motorsport	99	Edson Coelho Junior	1–3
MRF Motorsport	117	Gustavo Myasava	All
MRF Motorsport	777	Pedro Saderi	4–8
C2 Team	71	Mauricio Salla	1
C2 Team	177	Luca Milani	All
C.A. Competições	8	Vitor Guerin	8
C.A. Competições	84	Fernando Croce	4–8

== Race calendar and results ==
All races were held in Brazil.

Round		Circuit	Date	Pole position	Fastest lap	Winning driver	Winning team
1	R1	Autódromo Internacional Ayrton Senna	April 1	Edson Coelho Filho	Edson Coelho Filho	Gaetano Di Mauro	W2 Racing
1	R2	Autódromo Internacional Ayrton Senna	April 2		Vitor Baptista	Pietro Rimbano	RKL Competições
2	R1	Autódromo Internacional de Santa Cruz do Sul	May 20	Gustavo Frigotto	Gaetano Di Mauro	Luca Milani	C2 Team
2	R2	Autódromo Internacional de Santa Cruz do Sul	May 21		Luca Milani	Gustavo Frigotto	RKL Competições
3	R1	Autódromo Internacional de Cascavel	June 10	Gabriel Robe	Luca Millani	Gabriel Robe	Motortech Competições
3	R2	Autódromo Internacional de Cascavel	June 11		Gustavo Myasava	Gabriel Robe	Motortech Competições
4	R1	Autódromo Internacional de Curitiba	July 1	Raphael Reis	Gustavo Myasava	Gustavo Myasava	MRF Motorsport
4	R2	Autódromo Internacional de Curitiba	July 2		Gustavo Myasava	Gaetano di Mauro	W2 Racing
5	R1	Circuito dos Cristais	July 22	Raphael Reis	Marco Cozzi	Marco Cozzi	RSport
5	R2	Circuito dos Cristais	July 23		Gustavo Frigotto	Marco Cozzi	RSport
6	R1	Autódromo Internacional Ayrton Senna (Londrina)	September 9	Luca Millani	Vitor Baptista	Vitor Baptista	Full Time Academy
6	R2	Autódromo Internacional Ayrton Senna (Londrina)	September 10		Vitor Baptista	Giulio Borlenghi	Full Time Academy
7	R1	Autódromo Internacional Ayrton Senna	November 18	Gustavo Frigotto	Pietro Rimbano	Pietro Rimbano	RKL Competições
7	R2	Autódromo Internacional Ayrton Senna	November 19		Gaetano di Mauro	Raphael Reis	W2 Racing
8		Autódromo José Carlos Pace	December 10	Gaetano di Mauro	Gaetano di Mauro	Gaetano di Mauro	W2 Racing

== Championship standings ==
Points system

Points are awarded for each race at an event to the driver/s of a car that completed at least 75% of the race distance and was running at the completion of the race.

Points format	Position											
Points format	1st	2nd	3rd	4th	5th	6th	7th	8th	9th	10th	11th	12th
Race	20	16	13	11	9	7	6	5	4	3	2	1
Final race	40	32	26	22	18	14	12	10	8	6	4	2

- Race: Used for the first and second race, with partially reversed (top six) of each event.
- Final race: Used for the last round of the season with double points.

=== Drivers' Championship ===
Pos	Driver	GOI		VEL		SCZ		CUR		CRI		LON		GOI		INT	Pts
1	Gabriel Robe	9	12	8	4	**1**	1	8	2	4	3	5	2	6	**2**	5	172
2	Gaetano di Mauro	**1**	3	13	2	11	8	6	**1**	3	4	Ret	DSQ	15	3	**1**	160
3	Pietro Rimbano	8	1	5	7	6	**2**	5	4	Ret	14	13	Ret	1	5	3	138
4=	Raphael Reis	3	5	6	Ret	8	9	**2**	16	**2**	2			4	1		117
4=	Luca Milani	7	Ret	1	8	2	10	3	5	7	11	**2**	7	9	10	9	117
6	Gustavo Frigotto	14	10	**2**	1	5	3	14	8	DSQ	5	3	Ret	**2**	4	Ret	115
7=	Vitor Baptista	4	2					Ret	7	5	7	1	12	3	Ret	2	114
7=	Gustavo Myasava	5	9	11	10	3	5	1	17	Ret	10	Ret	3	5	6	4	114
9	Giulio Borlenghi	6	**6**	3	5	9	4	15	10	Ret	6	DSQ	1	5	7	8	99
10	Marco Cozzi	11	Ret	12	Ret	12	7	4	3	1	1	6	**6**	DSQ	9	Ret	92
11	Edson Coelhor Júnior	**2**	Ret	7	6	4	6										47
12	Mateus Muniz	12	7	4	3	7	11	Ret	11	Ret	13	Ret	Ret	12	16	13	42
13	Pedro Saderi							Ret	9	6	**8**	9	8	9	8	DSQ	35
14	Lukas Moraes							9	6			4	Ret	7	17	11	32
15	Lucas Peres			Ret	11	Ret	12	13	15	DNS	9	7	4	10	11	Ret	29
16	Antonio Matiazzi			10	Ret	Ret	Ret	Ret	14			8	5	13	Ret	10	23
17	Tuca Antoniazzi	13	11	9	9	10	13	10	18	Ret	12	11	11	14	15	Ret	21
18	Fábio Fogaça	Ret	4														11
19=	Raphael Campos					Ret	DNS	7	12					DSQ	12		8
19=	Dudu Taurisano	10	8	Ret	Ret	DNS	Ret										8
19=	Fernando Croce	Ret	Ret			Ret	14	11	Ret	DNS	DNS	10	10	16	14	15	8
22	Vinicius Margiota											12	9				5
23	Renato Braga							12	13								1
	Giuseppe Vecci													Ret	13		
	Mauricio Salla	DNS	DNS														0
	Leandro Romera									DNS	DNS						0
Drivers ineligible to score points
	Raphael Abbate															6	
	Vitor Guerin															7	
	João Rosate															12	
	Gabriel Lusquinos															14	
Pos	Driver	GOI		VEL		SCZ		CUR		CRI		LON		GOI		INT	Pts

Colour	Result
Gold	Winner
Silver	Second place
Bronze	Third place
Green	Points classification
Blue	Non-points classification
Blue	Non-classified finish (NC)
Purple	Retired, not classified (Ret)
Red	Did not qualify (DNQ)
Red	Did not pre-qualify (DNPQ)
Black	Disqualified (DSQ)
White	Did not start (DNS)
White	Withdrew (WD)
White	Race cancelled (C)
Blank	Did not practice (DNP)
Blank	Did not arrive (DNA)
Blank	Excluded (EX)

**Bold** – Pole position
Italics – Fastest lap
† – Retired, but classified
