= 2018 Stock Light season =

Car racing competition

The 2018 Stock Light is the sixteenth season of Stock Light. The 2018 season marks the first season since 2007, after the series endured an eleven-year absence.

== Teams and drivers ==
- All cars were powered by V8 engines and used the JL chassis. All drivers were Brazilian-registered except for Odair dos Santos, who raced under a Paraguayan racing license.

Team	No.	Driver	Class	Rounds
SG Racing	0	(Brazil) Pedro Saderi		3–7
SG Racing	27	(Brazil) Renan Guerra		5–8
SG Racing	28	(Brazil) Luiz Floss	R	4
SG Racing	33	(Brazil) Guto Matiazi		4
SG Racing	99	(Brazil) Edson Coelho Jr.		3
SG Racing	17	(Brazil) Pietro Rimbano		8
TMG-RZ Light Team	1	(Brazil) Erik Mayrink	R	All
TMG-RZ Light Team	66	(Brazil) Gustavo Bandeira	R	1–6
TMG-RZ Light Team	33	(Brazil) Guto Matiazi		7
TMG-RZ Light Team	78	(Brazil) Franco Pasquale	R	8
Cimed Racing Junior	9	(Brazil) Marcel Coletta	R	All
Cimed Racing Junior	10	(Brazil) Murilo Coletta	R	1–5
Cimed Racing Junior	8	(Brazil) Matheus Coletta	R	6–8
MRF Motorsport	12	(Brazil) Lauro Traldi		All
MRF Motorsport	71	(Brazil) Lucas Dalaffe	R	All
W2 Racing	17	(Brazil) Pietro Rimbano		1–5
W2 Racing	77	(Brazil) Raphael Reis		All
W2 Racing	10	(Brazil) Murilo Coletta	R	6–8
AN09 Team	07	(Brazil) Vinícius Margiota	R	1–3
AN09 Team	23	(Brazil) Marco Cozzi		1–3
AN09 Team	78	(Brazil) Lucas Peres		2–3
MRF Racing	15	(Brazil) Leonardo Sanchez		6, 8
MRF Racing	18	(Brazil) Gustavo Myasava		All
MRF Racing	74	(Paraguay) Odair dos Santos		1–3
MRF Racing	99	(Brazil) Edson Coelho Jr.		4–5
Motortech Competições	22	(Brazil) Gabriel Lusquiños	R	All
Motortech Competições	35	(Brazil) Gabriel Robe		All
Motortech Motorsport	46	(Brazil) Rogerio "Tuca" Antoniazzi		All
RKL Competições	36	(Brazil) Pedro Boesel		1–6, 8
RKL Competições	86	(Brazil) Gustavo Frigotto		All
RKL Competições	13	(Brazil) Diego Ramos	R	7
Carlos Alves Competições	43	(Brazil) Pedro Cardoso	R	All
Carlos Alves Competições	58	(Brazil) João Rosate	R	All
KTF Sports	07	(Brazil) Vinícius Margiota	R	4–7
KTF Sports	85	(Brazil) Enzo Bortoleto	R	All
KTF Sports	117	(Brazil) Guilherme Salas		8
Motorfast Racing	89	(Brazil) Rodrigo Gil		1–2
Motorfast Racing	14	(Brazil) Luca Milani		2–3
Motorfast Racing	25	(Brazil) Tiago Geromini		3
Motorfast Racing	37	(Brazil) Raphael Teixeira		4, 8
Motorfast Racing	74	(Paraguay) Odair dos Santos		4–7
Motorfast Racing	54	(Brazil) Rafael Lopes		8
Rsports Racing	20	(Brazil) Pedrinho Aguiar	R	6
Rsports Racing	23	(Brazil) Marco Cozzi		4–8
Rsports Racing	45	(Brazil) Giuseppe Vecci		4
Rsports Racing	11	(Brazil) Gaetano Di Mauro		5
Rsports Racing	80	(Brazil) Rouman Ziemkiewicz		8
L3 Motorsport	26	(Brazil) Raphael Abbate		4–8

Icon	Class
R	Rookie

== Race calendar and results ==
All races were held in Brazil.

Round		Circuit	Date	Pole position	Fastest lap	Winning driver	Winning team
1	R1	Autódromo José Carlos Pace	March 9	(Brazil) Gustavo Myasava	(Brazil) Gustavo Myasava	(Brazil) Gabriel Robe	Motortech Competições
1	R2	Autódromo José Carlos Pace	March 10		(Brazil) Gabriel Robe	(Brazil) João Rosate	Carlos Alves Competições
2	R1	Autódromo Internacional de Curitiba	April 7	(Brazil) Pietro Rimbano	(Brazil) Enzo Bortoleto	(Brazil) Marcel Coletta	Cimed Racing Junior
2	R2	Autódromo Internacional de Curitiba	April 8		(Brazil) Pietro Rimbano	(Brazil) Enzo Bortoleto	KTF Sports
3	R1	Autódromo Internacional Ayrton Senna (Londrina)	May 5	(Brazil) Gabriel Robe	(Brazil) Raphael Reis	(Brazil) Gabriel Robe	Motortech Competições
3	R2	Autódromo Internacional Ayrton Senna (Londrina)	May 6		(Brazil) Gustavo Frigotto	(Brazil) Luca Milani	Motorfast Racing
4	R1	Autódromo Internacional Ayrton Senna (Goiânia)	August 3	(Brazil) Pedro Cardoso	(Brazil) Raphael Reis	(Brazil) Raphael Reis	W2 Racing
4	R2	Autódromo Internacional Ayrton Senna (Goiânia)	August 4		(Brazil) Marcel Coletta	(Brazil) Pietro Rimbano	W2 Racing
5	R1	Autódromo Internacional Orlando Moura	August 18	(Brazil) Marcel Coletta	(Brazil) Pedro Cardoso	(Brazil) Pedro Cardoso	Carlos Alves Competições
5	R2	Autódromo Internacional Orlando Moura	August 19		(Brazil) Raphael Reis	(Brazil) Raphael Reis	W2 Racing
6	R1	Autódromo Velo Città	September 22	(Brazil) Gabriel Robe	(Brazil) Gabriel Robe	(Brazil) Pedro Cardoso	Carlos Alves Competições
6	R2	Autódromo Velo Città	September 23		(Brazil) Raphael Reis	(Brazil) Raphael Reis	W2 Racing
7	R1	Autódromo Internacional Ayrton Senna (Londrina)	October 20	(Brazil) Gabriel Robe	(Brazil) Raphael Reis	(Brazil) Raphael Reis	W2 Racing
7	R2	Autódromo Internacional Ayrton Senna (Londrina)	October 21		(Brazil) Raphael Abbate	(Brazil) Raphael Abbate	L3 Motorsport
8		Autódromo José Carlos Pace	December 9	(Brazil) Raphael Reis	(Brazil) Gabriel Robe	(Brazil) Guilherme Salas	KTF Sports

== Championship standings ==
Points system

Points are awarded for each race at an event to the driver/s of a car that completed at least 75% of the race distance and was running at the completion of the race.

Points format	Position														
Points format	1st	2nd	3rd	4th	5th	6th	7th	8th	9th	10th	11th	12th	13th	14th	15th
Feature races	30	26	22	19	17	15	13	11	9	7	5	4	3	2	1
Sprint races	20	17	14	12	10	8	6	5	4	3	2	1	0		
Final race	60	52	44	38	34	30	26	22	18	14	10	8	6	4	2

- Feature Race: Used for the first race.
- Sprint Race: Used for the first and second race, with partially reversed (top ten) of each event.
- Final race: Used for the last round of the season with double points.

=== Drivers' Championship ===
Pos	Driver	INT		CUR		LON		GOI		MS		VCA		LON		INT	Pts
1	(Brazil) Raphael Reis	5	Ret	2	6	6	6	1	Ret	10	1	9	1	1	8	**5**	229
2	(Brazil) Enzo Bortoleto	2	14	5	1	2	5	2	17	5	3	14	EX	11	Ret	9	181
3	(Brazil) Pedro Cardoso	6	17	Ret	Ret	4	7	**Ret**	Ret	1	7	1	10	4	4	4	178
4	(Brazil) Gabriel Robe	1	2	EX	4	**1**	9	Ret	14	8	4	**12**	Ret	**DSQ**	11	2	174
5	(Brazil) João Rosate	4	1	4	9	18	19	11	2	2	5	Ret	Ret	10	14	8	149
6	(Brazil) Gustavo Frigotto	Ret	7	Ret	5	7	3	3	Ret	6	Ret	3	4	3	7	17	142
7	(Brazil) Pietro Rimbano	3	5	**Ret**	3	3	8	DSQ	1	Ret	16					3	137
8	(Brazil) Marco Cozzi	Ret	8	13	Ret	5	4	Ret	12	4	6	15	6	2	3	12	122
9	(Brazil) Gustavo Myasava	**12**	Ret	6	14	11	10	6	Ret	15	12	Ret	8	5	6	6	106
10	(Brazil) Marcel Coletta	10	3	1	10	12	12	18	7	**Ret**	21	2	Ret	DSQ	Ret	10	105
11	(Brazil) Raphael Abbate							Ret	11	7	2	4	3	9	1	11	104
12	(Brazil) Pedro Boesel	8	4	Ret	Ret	8	20	4	9	9	10	6	5			25	94
13	(Brazil) Vinícius Margiota	Ret	Ret	9	Ret	19	13	14	10	12	15	7	2	7	2		78
14	(Brazil) Murilo Coletta	13	13	3	Ret	Ret	Ret	8	3	Ret	14	5	EX	12	Ret	13	77
15	(Brazil) Renan Guerra									EX	11	8	13	6	5	7	64
16	(Brazil) Guilherme Salas															1	60
17	(Brazil) Luca Milani			7	2	10	1										57
18	(Brazil) Erik Mayrink	7	6	12	8	15	11	Ret	Ret	13	Ret	Ret	7	Ret	12	14	45
19	(Brazil) Pedro Saderi					9	2	Ret	13	11	13	Ret	9	Ret	10		38
20=	(Brazil) Gaetano di Mauro									3	8						27
20=	(Brazil) Lucas Dalaffe	11	11	Ret	Ret	22	15	7	8	Ret	17	Ret	11	Ret	Ret	21	27
22	(Brazil) Gustavo Bandeira	15	9	Ret	12	13	18	5	Ret	Ret	Ret	16	18				26
23	(Brazil) Luiz Floss							9	4								21
24	(Brazil) Tuca Antoniazzi	9	10	Ret	Ret	Ret	Ret	10	Ret	17	18	17	14	Ret	Ret	20	19
25	(Paraguay) Odair dos Santos	Ret	16	11	13	21	Ret	16	6	19	Ret	13	15	Ret	Ret		16
26	(Brazil) Diego Ramos													8	9		15
27	(Brazil) Lauro Traldi	14	15	EX	11	Ret	17	15	16	18	19	10	16	14	15	19	14
28	(Brazil) Lucas Peres			10	7	17	Ret										13
29	(Brazil) Rodrigo Gil	Ret	12	8	Ret												12
30	(Brazil) Giuseppe Vecci							EX	5								10
31	(Brazil) Gabriel Lusquiños	Ret	Ret	Ret	Ret	14	16	17	Ret	14	20	11	EX	DSQ	13	16	9
32	(Brazil) Edson Coelho Jr.					20	Ret	13	15	16	9						7
33	(Brazil) Matheus Coletta											Ret	Ret	13	16	15	5
34	(Brazil) Raphael Teixeira							12	DSQ							Ret	4
35	(Brazil) Pedro Aguiar											Ret	12				1
	(Brazil) Rafael Lopes															18	0
	(Brazil) Franco Pasquale															22	0
	(Brazil) Rouman Ziemkiewcz															23	0
	(Brazil) Tiago Geromini					16	14										0
	(Brazil) Antonio Matiazzi													Ret	Ret		0
	(Brazil) Leonardo Sanchez											18	17			24	0
Pos	Driver	INT		CUR		LON		GOI		MS		VCA		LON		INT	Pts

Colour	Result
Gold	Winner
Silver	Second place
Bronze	Third place
Green	Points classification
Blue	Non-points classification
Blue	Non-classified finish (NC)
Purple	Retired, not classified (Ret)
Red	Did not qualify (DNQ)
Red	Did not pre-qualify (DNPQ)
Black	Disqualified (DSQ)
White	Did not start (DNS)
White	Withdrew (WD)
White	Race cancelled (C)
Blank	Did not practice (DNP)
Blank	Did not arrive (DNA)
Blank	Excluded (EX)

**Bold** – Pole position
Italics – Fastest lap
† – Retired, but classified
