= Lico Kaesemodel =

Brazilian racing driver

- Nationality: (Brazil) Brazilian
- Born: Orlando Otto Kaesemodel Neto; May 10, 1983 (age 43) Curitiba (Brazil)

Stock Car Brasil career
- Debut season: 2006
- Current team: RCM Motorsport
- Car number: 4
- Starts: 63
- Wins: 0
- Poles: 0
- Fastest laps: 0
- Best finish: 15th in 2010

Orlando Otto Kaesemodel Neto, better known as Lico Kaesemodel (born May 10, 1983 in Curitiba) is a Brazilian racing driver, currently drives in Stock Car Brasil.

== Career ==
Kaesemodel started karting career in 1995 and won four time the Curitiba states championship, three time South Brazilian championship and one time the Brazilian championship.

Kaesemodel won the Trofeo Maserati Brazil in 2004. Kaesemodel debuted to Stock Car Brasil in 2006 for one race to Katalogo Racing team. In 2007, he would move to AMG Motorsport as a teammate of Ingo Hoffmann. In 2010, Kaesemodel would move from AMG Motorsport to RCM Motorsport.

== Complete Stock Car Brasil results ==
Year	Team	Car	1	2	3	4	5	6	7	8	9	10	11	12	Pos	Points
2006	Katalogo Racing	Mitsubishi Lancer	INT	CTB	CGD	INT	LON	CTB	SCZ	BSB	TAR	ARG; Ret	RIO	INT	NC	0
2007	AMG Motorsport	Mitsubishi Lancer	INT; Ret	CTB; 14	CGD; DNQ	INT; DNQ	LON; DNQ	SCZ; Ret	CTB; DNQ	BRA; 18	ARG; Ret	TAR; DNQ	RIO; DNQ	INT; DNQ	37th	2
2008	AMG Motorsport	Mitsubishi Lancer	INT; Ret	BSB; Ret	CTB; Ret	SCZ; 14	CGD; Ret	INT; 20	RIO; Ret	LON; 12	CTB; 6	BSB; 11	TAR; 14	INT; 4	15th	36
2009	AMG Motorsport	Chevrolet Vectra	INT; 6	CTB; 25	BSB; 20	SCZ; Ret	INT; 5	SAL; Ret	RIO; 23	CGD; 20	CTB; 12	BSB; 14	TAR; 8	INT; Ret	19th	36
2010	RCM Motorsport	Peugeot 307	INT; 5	CTB; 10	VEL; 14	RIO; 23	RBP; DNS	SAL; 12	INT; 12	CGD; 21	LON; 14	SCZ; Ret	BSB; 10	CTB; 9	15th	43
2011	RCM Motorsport	Chevrolet Vectra	CTB; Ret	INT; 15	RBP; 16	VEL; Ret	CGD; 18	RIO; 9	INT; Ret	SAL; DNS	SCZ; 12	LON; 21	BSB; 21	VEL; 24	24th	12
2012	RCM Motorsport	Chevrolet Sonic	INT; 10	CTB; 13	VEL; Ret	RBP; 11	LON; 14	RIO; 16	SAL; 16	CAS; 10	TAR; Ret	CTB; Ret	BSB; 13	INT; Ret	17th	65
