= Blau Motorsports =

Brazilian racing team

(Brazil) Blau Motorsports
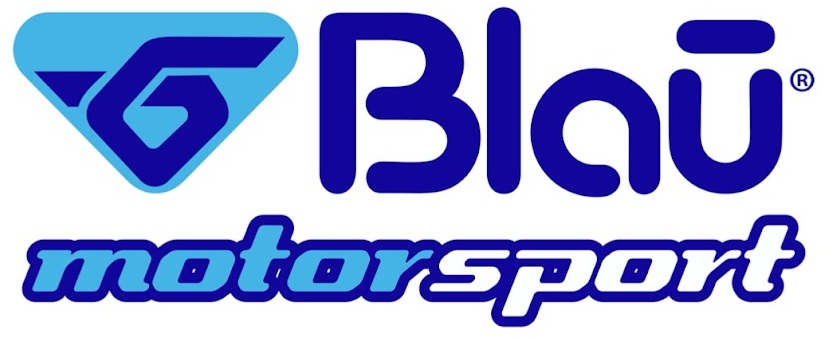
- Founded: 2017
- Nation: Brazil
- Base: São Paulo, Brazil
- Team principal(s): Marcelo Hahn
- Current series: International GT Open
- Noted drivers: Cesar Ramos; Allam Khodair; Kelvin van der Linde

Blau Motorsport is a Brazilian professional auto racing team based in São Paulo, currently competing in International GT Open in a partnership with AF Corse.

The team was created in 2017 by Marcelo Hahn and his Blausigel company to compete in Stock Car Brasil. In 2020 the team decided not run its own team and started technical partnerships and title sponsor with others teams. From 2020 to 2022 with TMG Racing 2023, and 2024 with RMattheis Motorsport and since 2025 with Pole Motorsport.
