= Cacá Bueno Circuit =

Racing circuit in Rio de Janeiro, Brazil

Circuito Cacá Bueno
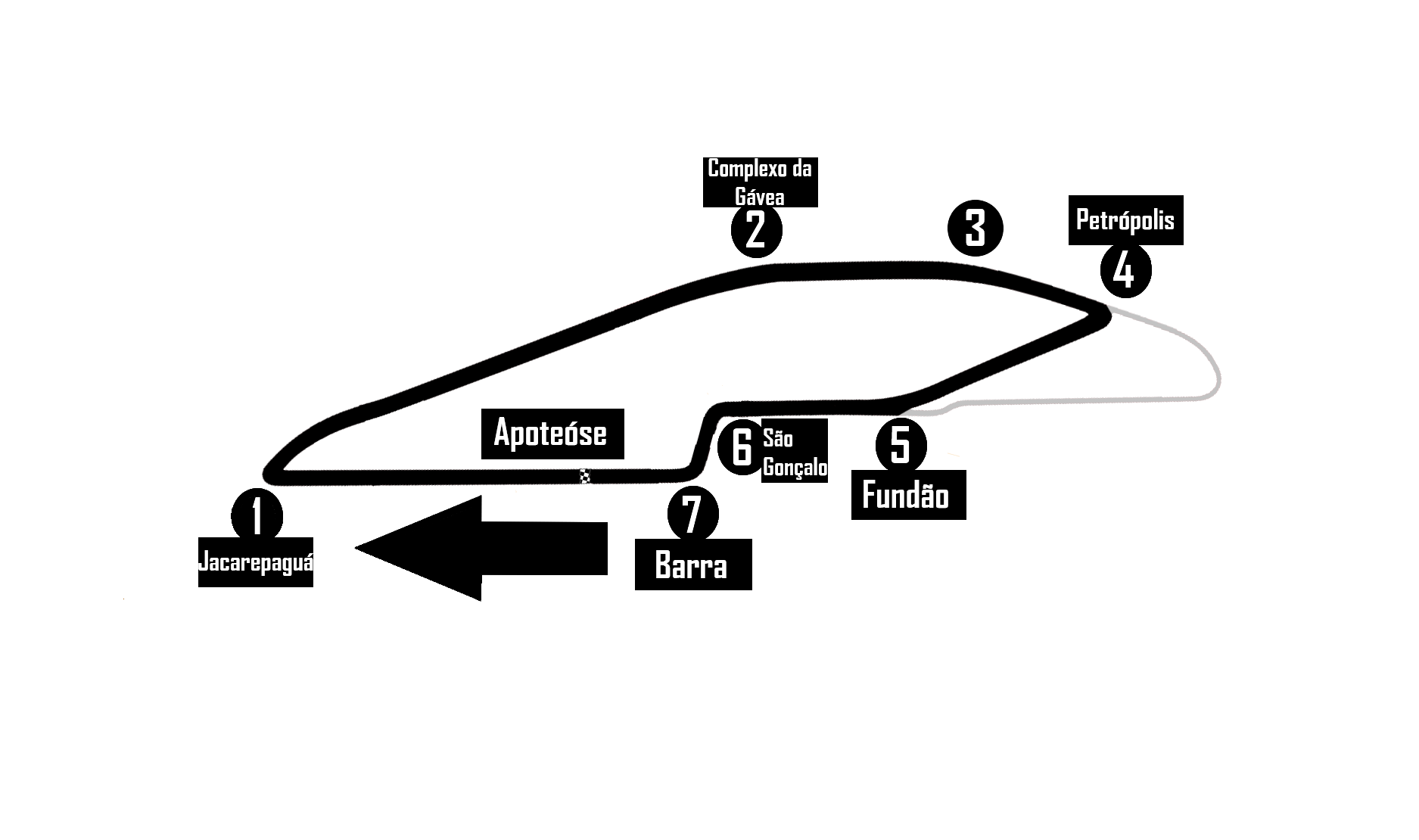
- Location: Rio de Janeiro, Brazil
- Opened: 8 April 2022; 4 years ago
- Closed: 10 April 2022; 4 years ago
- Major events: Stock Car Pro Series; GP do Galeão (2022)

Full Circuit (2022)
- Length: 3.225 km (2.004 mi)
- Turns: 7
- Race lap record: 1:05.011 ( (Brazil) Daniel Serra, Chevrolet Cruze Stock Car, 2022, Stock Car Pro)

In 2022, the Rio de Janeiro/Galeão International Airport was used for Stock Car Pro Series automobile racing. A circuit named after Cacá Bueno, Rio de Janeiro-born and 5 times Stock Car Brasil champion, was built within the airport partially using runways 10/28 for this purpose. This circuit contributed to the return of Stock Car Pro Series to Rio de Janeiro. It was the first race since 2012, when the race was held at Jacarepaguá. However, the circuit was not included into the 2023 Stock Car Pro Series calendar due to the increase of flights after the COVID-19 pandemic.

== Lap records ==
As of July 2022, the fastest official lap records at the Cacá Bueno Circuit are listed as:

| Category | Time | Driver | Vehicle | Event |
Full Circuit (2022): 3.225 km (2.004 mi)
| Stock Car Pro | 1:05.011 | Daniel Serra | Chevrolet Cruze Stock Car | 2022 Galeão Stock Car Brasil round |
| Stock Series | 1:09.161 | Vitor Baptista | Chevrolet Cruze JL-G12 | 2022 Galeão Stock Series round |
