= Circuito Toninho da Matta =

Motor racing track in Belo Horizonte, Minas Gerais, Brazil

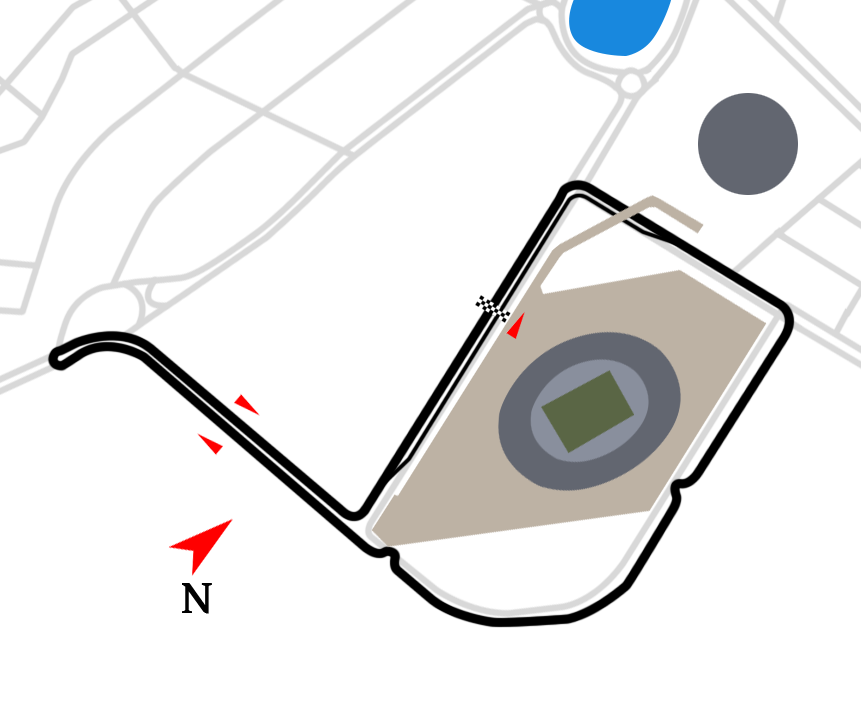
- Street Circuit (2024)
- Location: Belo Horizonte, Minas Gerais, Brazil
- Coordinates: 19°51′59″S 43°58′22″W
- Opened: 16 August 2024; 23 months ago
- Closed: 18 August 2024; 23 months ago
- Former names: Belo Horizonte Street Circuit (2024)
- Major events: Former: Stock Car Pro Series; BH Stock Festival (2024)

Street Circuit (2024)
- Length: 3.095 km (1.923 mi)
- Turns: 13
- Race lap record: 1:26.227 ( (Brazil) Arthur Leist, Toyota Corolla E210, 2024, Stock Car Pro)

Circuito Toninho da Matta was a 3.095 km (1.923 mi) street circuit located around the Mineirão stadium and Lake Pampulha in Belo Horizonte, Minas Gerais, Brazil. The circuit was opened in August 2024 by hosting the seventh round of 2024 Stock Car Pro Series, and the race was named as BH Stock Festival.

Before the circuit opening, it was announced that the circuit was named after Toninho da Matta, who is a local racer and also the father of Cristiano da Matta.

== Lap records ==
The fastest official lap records at the Circuito Toninho da Matta are listed as:

Category	Time	Driver	Vehicle	Event
Street Circuit (2024): 3.095 km (1.923 mi)
Stock Car Pro	1:26.227	Arthur Leist	Toyota Corolla E210	2024 Belo Horizonte Stock Car Pro round
