= Autódromo Velo Città =

Motor racing venue

Autódromo Velocitta
- Location: Mogi Guaçu, São Paulo
- Coordinates: 22°17′20″S 46°50′54″W
- FIA Grade: 3
- Operator: FREC Empreendimentos Imobiliários
- Broke ground: 2010
- Opened: 16 June 2012; 14 years ago
- Major events: Current: TCR South America (2022–present); Stock Car Pro Series (2017–present); NASCAR Brasil Series (2017–2023, 2025–present); Porsche Cup Brasil (2015–2019, 2021–present); Former: Fórmula Academy Sudamericana (2018); F3 Brasil (2017)
- Website: http://www.autodromovelocitta.com.br

Alternative Full Circuit (2015–present)
- Surface: Asphalt
- Length: 3.443 km (2.139 mi)
- Turns: 13
- Race lap record: 1:20.142 ( (Brazil) Guilherme Samaia, Dallara F309, 2017, F3)

Full Circuit (2012–present)
- Surface: Asphalt
- Length: 3.493 km (2.170 mi)
- Turns: 13

West Circuit (2012–present)
- Surface: Asphalt
- Length: 1.420 km (0.882 mi)
- Turns: 7

East Circuit (2012–present)
- Surface: Asphalt
- Length: 1.830 km (1.137 mi)
- Turns: 10

East Circuit with "H" Loop (2012–present)
- Surface: Asphalt
- Length: 2.090 km (1.299 mi)
- Turns: 13

Autódromo Velocitta is a 3.443 km (2.139 mi) motor racing circuit that is located on a private property in the municipality of Mogi Guaçu, São Paulo, Brazil, about 180 km (110 mi) north of the state capital São Paulo.

With a focus on competitions and closed events such as track days, test drives, press conferences and driving courses, the race track has hosted numerous events since its inauguration, among them: 1000 Brazilian Historic Miles, 500Km de São Paulo, Classic Cup, Porsche GT3 Cup Brasil, Lancer Cup, several releases from the automotive industry such as Suzuki, Bentley, Pirelli, Michelin, Continental Tires, Mitsubishi Motors, Mini, Jaguar, Land Rover, Mercedes-Benz, Audi, BMW, Renault, Nissan, Ferrari, Peugeot, Fiat, Chevrolet, Volkswagen, Ford, Honda, Yamaha, Triumph and many others.

== History ==
In June 2012, the site was approved by the CBA. Then, the project and the plans were sent to the FIA (Fédération Internationale de l'Automobile). The material underwent a computerized evaluation that verified the basic items. With the validation of the system, Velo Città received a visit from an inspector, who attested it to be able to receive international competitions in Touring and GT racing, in October 2013.

In 2014, the paddock on the pits was opened, with the capacity to receive around 500 VIP guests with the most privileged view of the track and also the race steering tower. In March 2015, the new Capirinha and Ferradura curves were inaugurated, making the circuit more challenging and faster in professional competition events. In 2015, the 2.500 km (1.553 mi) offroad track and 18 obstacles were prepared to show what a 4x4 vehicle or a bigtrail motorcycle is capable of facing.

In April 2017, Velo Città hosted three simultaneous events: Mitsubishi Motorsports, Mitsubishi Outdoor and the Mitsubishi Cup. In August of that year, the first race of the largest category of Brazilian motorsport was held, the Stock Car. Along with it, the Mercedes-Benz Challenge and Brasileiro de Marcas category completed the program, which could be checked closely by the public, who attended the event in a grandstand built especially for the occasion. In September 2018, it had its second Stock Car race in Mogi Guaçu. In 2019, important races took place on the track, including the third race of Stock Car and the Old Stock Race in celebration of the category's 40th anniversary.

== Layouts ==
With 13 curves, 15 signaling posts, 8 boxes, the main route, known as the Complete External Circuit, is 3.443 km (2.139 mi) long, with a 45 m (148 ft) difference in height. It is not a high track, with most medium and low speed curves. There is also the option to use the West Circuit (Circuito Oeste), with 1.420 km (0.882 mi) in length, the East Circuit (Circuito Oeste) at 1.830 km (1.137 mi) or the East Circuit with the "H" leg (Circuito Leste com "H" ), totaling 2.090 km (1.299 mi).

== Events ==
Current

- March: Porsche Cup Brasil
- June: NASCAR Brasil Series
- July: TCR South America Touring Car Championship, Stock Car Pro Series, Stock Light, TCR Brazil Touring Car Championship, F4 Brazilian Championship

Former

- Brasileiro de Marcas (2017)
- Brazilian Formula Three Championship (2017)
- Fórmula Academy Sudamericana (2018)
- Turismo Nacional BR (2017, 2024–2025)

== Lap records ==
As of October 2025, the fastest official lap records at the Autódromo Velo Città are listed as:

Category	Time	Driver	Vehicle	Event
Alternative Full Circuit (2015–present): 3.443 km (2.139 mi)
Formula 3	1:20.142	Guilherme Samaia	Dallara F309	2017 Velo Città Formula 3 Brasil round
Formula 4	1:25.724	Matheus Comparatto	Tatuus F4-T421	2023 Velo Città F4 Brasil round
Porsche Carrera Cup	1:28.501	Gabriel Casagrande	Porsche 911 (991 II) GT3 Cup	2020 Velo Città Porsche Cup Brasil Endurance round
Stock Car Pro	1:29.283	Gaetano di Mauro	Mitsubishi Eclipse Cross	2025 1st Velo Città Stock Car Pro round
Stock Light	1:32.864	Rafael Martins	Chevrolet Cruze JL-G12	2025 2nd Velo Città Stock Light round
TCR Touring Car	1:33.027	Pedro Cardoso	Peugeot 308 GTI TCR	2025 Velo Città TCR South America round
Formula Renault 1.6	1:34.582	Enzo Bortoleto	Signatech FR 1.6	2018 Velo Città Formula Academy Sudamericana round
NASCAR Brasil	1:39.188	Cacá Bueno	Chevrolet Camaro SS	2025 1st Velo Città NASCAR Brasil round
Turismo Nacional BR	1:44.569	Alexandre Bastos	Toyota Yaris	2025 Velo Città Turismo Nacional Brasil round
