= 2015 Brasileiro de Marcas =

Car racing competition

The 2015 Copa Petrobrás de Marcas season was the fifth season of the Brasileiro de Marcas. It began at Goiânia in March, and ended at Interlagos in December. In 2015 Brasileiro de Marcas was integrated at Stock Car Brasil events, with only the last round at Interlagos being held as a stand-alone event.

On 18 December 2014, Renault announced their return to Brazilian motorsport with four Renault Fluences being run by two official teams. After one win in three seasons, Mitsubishi will not return in 2015.

== Teams and drivers ==
All drivers were Brazilian registered, except for Odair dos Santos, who ran under Paraguayan racing license and Ayman Darwich who ran under Egyptian racing license.

Team	Car	No.	Drivers	Rounds
JLM Sport	Honda Civic	0	Gustavo Martins	All
JLM Sport	Honda Civic	57	Felipe Tozzo	All
JLM Sport	Honda Civic	57	Mauri Zaccarelli	8
RZ Motorsport Toyota	Toyota Corolla XRS	1	Thiago Marques	All
RZ Motorsport Toyota	Toyota Corolla XRS	17	Daniel Kaefer	All
JLM Racing	Honda Civic	3	Vítor Meira	All
JLM Racing	Honda Civic	43	Vicente Orige	All
Toyota Bassani	Toyota Corolla XRS	6	Alceu Feldmann	1
Toyota Bassani	Toyota Corolla XRS	9	Rodrigo Baptista	All
Toyota Bassani	Toyota Corolla XRS	15	Bia Figueiredo	8
Toyota Bassani	Toyota Corolla XRS	28	Luiz Razia	2
Toyota Bassani	Toyota Corolla XRS	31	Willian Starostik	3–8
C2 Team	Renault Fluence	7	Beto Cavaleiro	1–7
C2 Team	Renault Fluence	7	Renan Guerra	4–5
C2 Team	Renault Fluence	7	Osman Didi	6–7
C2 Team	Renault Fluence	38	Gaetano Di Mauro	8
C2 Team	Renault Fluence	38	Sergio Ramalho	8
C2 Team	Renault Fluence	83	Gabriel Casagrande	All
AGB Preparações	Chevrolet Cruze	8	Willian Freire	1–3
AGB Preparações	Chevrolet Cruze	8	Thiago Oliveira	2
AGB Preparações	Chevrolet Cruze	46	Fernando Miranda	3
AGB Preparações	Chevrolet Cruze	46	Renan Guerra	3
AGB Preparações	Chevrolet Cruze	79	Flávio Lisboa	3
AGB Preparações	Chevrolet Cruze	97	Luiz Sérgio Sena Jr.	1
AGB Preparações	Chevrolet Cruze	97	Roger Sandoval	1
AGB Preparações	Chevrolet Cruze	98	Carlos Eduardo Souza	2
KFF Pro Racing	Chevrolet Cruze	8	Willian Freire	4–5
KFF Pro Racing	Chevrolet Cruze	88	Alberto Cattucci	4–6, 8
KFF Pro Racing	Chevrolet Cruze	88	Odair Dos Santos	5
KFF Pro Racing	Chevrolet Cruze	88	Mauricio Lund	8
KFF Pro Racing	Chevrolet Cruze	555	Ayman Darwich	8
KFF Pro Racing	Chevrolet Cruze	888	Alexandre Navarro	7
KFF Pro Racing	Chevrolet Cruze	888	Beto Monteiro	7
KFF Pro Racing	Chevrolet Cruze	999	Edson Coelho Jr.	7
Onze Motorsports	Chevrolet Cruze	11	Nonô Figueiredo	All
Onze Motorsports	Chevrolet Cruze	12	Guilherme Salas	All
Full Time Sports	Renault Fluence	13	Eduardo Rocha	1–3
Full Time Sports	Renault Fluence	18	Allam Khodair	4
Full Time Sports	Renault Fluence	45	Fábio Carbone	5–8
Full Time Sports	Renault Fluence	111	Rubens Barrichello	All
Amir Nasr Racing	Ford Focus	31	Willian Starostik	1–2
Amir Nasr Racing	Ford Focus	36	Vitor Genz	1
Amir Nasr Racing	Ford Focus	59	Renan Guerra	2
Júpiter Racing Team	Ford Focus	53	Ronaldo Kastropil	1–3
Júpiter Racing Team	Ford Focus	99	Mario Cesár Bonilha	All
Júpiter Racing Team	Ford Focus	199	Marcelo de Tripa Rocha	4–8

== Race calendar and results ==
All races were held in Brazil.

Round		Circuit	Date	Pole position	Fastest lap	Winning driver	Winning team
1	R1	Autódromo Internacional Ayrton Senna	March 21	Vítor Meira	Vítor Meira	César Bonilha	Jupiter Racing Team
1	R2	Autódromo Internacional Ayrton Senna	March 22	Eduardo Rocha	Daniel Kaefer	Vicente Orige	JLM Racing
2	R1	Velopark, Nova Santa Rita	April 25	Nonô Figueiredo	Guilherme Salas	Gabriel Casagrande	C2 Team
2	R2	Velopark, Nova Santa Rita	April 26	Renan Guerra	Vítor Meira	Nonô Figueiredo	Onze Motorsport
3	R1	Autódromo Internacional de Curitiba	May 30	Gabriel Casagrande	Daniel Kaefer	Gabriel Casagrande	C2 Team
3	R2	Autódromo Internacional de Curitiba	May 31	Thiago Marques	Daniel Kaefer	Thiago Marques	RZ Motorsport Toyota
4	R1	Autódromo Internacional de Curitiba	August 1	Guilherme Salas	Guilherme Salas	Guilherme Salas	Onze Motorsports
4	R2	Autódromo Internacional de Curitiba	August 2	William Starostik	Guilherme Salas	Guilherme Salas	Onze Motorsports
5	R1	Autódromo Internacional Ayrton Senna	August 15	Guilherme Salas	Nonô Figueiredo	Guilherme Salas	Onze Motorsports
5	R2	Autódromo Internacional Ayrton Senna	August 16	Vicente Orige	Guilherme Salas	Rodrigo Baptista	Toyota Bassani
6	R1	Autódromo Internacional Orlando Moura	September 12	Gabriel Casagrande	Fábio Carbone	Gabriel Casagrande	C2 Team
6	R2	Autódromo Internacional Orlando Moura	September 13	Cesár Bonilha	Fábio Carbone	Fábio Carbone	Full Time Sports
7	R1	Autódromo Internacional de Curitiba	October 17	Fábio Carbone	Rubens Barrichello	Gabriel Casagrande	C2 Team
7	R2	Autódromo Internacional de Curitiba	October 18	Gustavo Martins	Rubens Barrichello	Fábio Carbone	Full Time Sports
8	R1	Autódromo José Carlos Pace	December 12	Rubens Barrichello	Fábio Carbone	Fábio Carbone	Full Time Sports
8	R2	Autódromo José Carlos Pace	December 13	Daniel Kaefer	Fábio Carbone	Gabriel Casagrande	C2 Team
