= 2016 Brasileiro de Marcas =

Car racing competition

The 2016 Copa Petrobrás de Marcas season was the sixth season of the Brasileiro de Marcas. It commenced at Velopark, Nova Santa Rita in April, and concluded at Interlagos in December. In 2016 Brasileiro de Marcas will be integrated at Stock Car Brasil events, with only the last round at Interlagos being held as a stand-alone event.

== Teams and drivers ==
Team	Car	No.	Drivers	Status	Rounds
JLM Sport	Honda Civic	0	(Brazil) Gustavo Martins		All
JLM Sport	Honda Civic	17	(Brazil) Daniel Keafer		All
RZ Motorsport Toyota	Toyota Corolla XRS	1	(Brazil) Thiago Marques		All
RZ Motorsport Toyota	Toyota Corolla XRS	33	(Brazil) Ricardo Sperafico		1
RZ Motorsport Toyota	Toyota Corolla XRS	33	(Brazil) Patrick Choate	R	All
RZ Motorsport Toyota	Toyota Corolla XRS	33	(Brazil) Luiz Razia		2–8
JLM Racing	Honda Civic	26	(Brazil) Carlos SG Souza		All
JLM Racing	Honda Civic	43	(Brazil) Vicente Orige		All
Paraguay Racing Team	Toyota Corolla XRS	74	(Paraguay) Odair dos Santos	R	All
Paraguay Racing Team	Toyota Corolla XRS	88	(Brazil) Marco Romacinini		1–3
Paraguay Racing Team	Toyota Corolla XRS	88	(Brazil) Thiago Klein	R	All
C2 Team	Renault Fluence	3	(Brazil) Antonio Pizzonia		7
C2 Team	Renault Fluence	31	(Brazil) William Starostik		1–6, 8
C2 Team	Renault Fluence	31	(Brazil) André Bragantini Jr.		6
C2 Team	Renault Fluence	83	(Brazil) Gabriel Casagrande		All
Radiex-R Sports	Chevrolet Cruze	9	(Brazil) Leandro Romera		6
Radiex-R Sports	Chevrolet Cruze	9	(Brazil) Alexandre Navarro		6, 8
Radiex-R Sports	Chevrolet Cruze	55	(Brazil) Renato Braga		1
Radiex-R Sports	Chevrolet Cruze	55	(Brazil) Renan Guerra		1–3, 5
Radiex-R Sports	Chevrolet Cruze	55	(Brazil) Beto Monteiro		2, 4, 7–8
Radiex-R Sports	Chevrolet Cruze	55	(Brazil) Ricardo Gargiolo	R	3–5
Radiex-R Sports	Chevrolet Cruze	89	(Brazil) Mauro Meuenschwalder		7
Radiex-R Sports	Chevrolet Cruze	89	(Brazil) Felipe Rabelo		7
Radiex-R Sports	Chevrolet Cruze	555	(Egypt) Ayman Darwich	R	1–6, 8
Onze Motorsports	Chevrolet Cruze	11	(Brazil) Nonô Figueiredo		All
Onze Motorsports	Chevrolet Cruze	12	(Brazil) Marcio Basso	R	All
Onze Motorsports	Chevrolet Cruze	12	(Brazil) Bruno Mesquita		2
Greco Competições	Renault Fluence	21	(Brazil) Guilherme Salas		All
Greco Competições	Renault Fluence	22	(Brazil) Fábio Carbone		1–6, 8
Friato Racing Team	Ford Focus	57	(Brazil) Felipe Tozzo		3–8
Friato Racing Team	Ford Focus	66	(Brazil) Enrico Bucci	R	5–8
Friato Racing Team	Ford Focus	99	(Brazil) Mário Cesár Bonilha		1–2
Friato Racing Team	Ford Focus	199	(Brazil) Marcelo di Tripa Rocha		1–4

Icon	Meaning
R	Series rookie for 2016

== Race calendar and results ==
All races were held in Brazil.

Round		Circuit	Date	Pole position	Fastest lap	Winning driver	Winning team
1	R1	Velopark, Nova Santa Rita	April 9	Vicente Orige	Vicente Orige	Vicente Orige	JLM Racing
1	R2	Velopark, Nova Santa Rita	April 10	Thiago Marques	Guilherme Salas	Thiago Marques	RZ Motorsport Toyota
2	R1	Autódromo Internacional Ayrton Senna	May 21	Gustavo Martins	Fábio Carbone	Gustavo Martins	JLM Racing
2	R2	Autódromo Internacional Ayrton Senna	May 22	Nonô Figueiredo	Daniel Keafer	Daniel Keafer	JLM Sport
3	R1	Autódromo Internacional de Santa Cruz do Sul	June 4	Guilherme Salas	Guilherme Salas	Guilherme Salas	Renault Greco Competições
3	R2	Autódromo Internacional de Santa Cruz do Sul	June 5	Renan Guerra; Ricardo Gargiulo	Guilherme Salas	Nonô Figueiredo	Chevrolet Onze Motorsport
4	R1	Autódromo Internacional de Tarumã	June 25	Fábio Carbone	Fábio Carbone	Fábio Carbone	Renault Greco Competições
4	R2	Autódromo Internacional de Tarumã	June 26	Felipe Tozzo	Felipe Tozzo	Felipe Tozzo	Friato Racing Team
5	R1	Autódromo José Carlos Pace	September 10	Guilherme Salas	Gabriel Casagrande	Gabriel Casagrande	Renault C2 Team
5	R2	Autódromo José Carlos Pace	September 11	Vicente Orige	Nonô Figueiredo	Vicente Orige	JLM Sport
6	R1	Autódromo Internacional Ayrton Senna (Londrina)	September 24	Gabriel Casagrande	Gabriel Casagrande	Carlos "SG" Souza	JLM Sport
6	R2	Autódromo Internacional Ayrton Senna (Londrina)	September 25	Thiago Marques	Guilherme Salas	Thiago Marques	RZ Riachuello Toyota
7	R1	Circuito dos Cristais	November 19	Gabriel Casagrande	Gabriel Casagrande	Gabriel Casagrande	Renault C2 Team
7	R2	Circuito dos Cristais	November 20	Guilherme Salas	Gabriel Casagrande	Guilherme Salas	Renault Greco competições
8	R1	Autódromo José Carlos Pace	December 10	Gabriel Casagrande	Willian Starostik	Gustavo Martins	JLM Racing
8	R2	Autódromo José Carlos Pace	December 11	Nonô Figueiredo	Nonô Figueiredo	Nonô Figueiredo	Chevrolet Onze Motorsport
