= Guilherme Salas =

Brazilian racing driver (born 1994)

- Nationality: Brazilian
- Born: 25 April 1994 (age 32) Jundiaí, São Paulo, Brazil

Stock Car Pro Series career
- Debut season: 2016
- Current team: Cavaleiro Valda
- Categorisation: FIA Gold
- Car number: 85
- Starts: 152
- Wins: 4
- Poles: 5
- Fastest laps: 1
- Best finish: 10th in 2020

Championship titles
- 2013 2014 2019: Sprint Race Brasil; Campeonato Brasileiro de Turismo; Stock Light

Guilherme "Gui" Salas (born 25 April 1994) is a Brazilian racing driver currently competing in Stock Car Pro Series with Cavaleiro Valda. He was the 2014 Campeonato Brasileiro de Turismo and 2019 Stock Light champion.

== Career ==
=== Early career ===
Born in Jundiaí, Salas began competing when he was seven years old. His biggest successes in karting were victories in Paulista de Kart and Super Kart Brasil. In 2011, he moved to single-seaters and competed in Formula Future Fiat, and took two race victories. He then switched to touring cars, becoming champion of Sprint Race Brasil in 2013.

=== Stock Light ===
In 2014, Salas was crowned champion of the Campeonato Brasileiro de Turismo in his first full year in the series, winning six of the twelve races.

After spending time competing in its parent series Stock Car, KTF Sports suggested that Salas return to the series now named Stock Light. He competed in the final round of 2018, which he won, and became a second-time champion in 2019 with seven wins out of fifteen races.

=== Stock Car Pro Series ===
Salas' first experience in Stock Car came in 2015, when he joined Popó Bueno for the all-star race in Goiânia, but the pair retired from the race. He competed in the all-star race again in 2016, this time with Ricardo Maurício, and the pair took pole position and finished third in the race. He then joined the grid for the final five races of the season with RZ Motorsport, and took a best result of tenth.

Salas' first full season was in 2017 with Vogel Motorsport alongside Gabriel Casagrande. He took his first solo podium in Cascavel. Overall, he finished 22nd in the final standings. For the 2018 season, he joined Bardahl Hot Car, but only competed in the first six rounds of the championship before having to leave due to a lack of sponsors. He then competed in the final Goiânia round of the 2019 season alongside his Stock Light campaign, replacing Marcos Gomes who was competing in the Asian Le Mans Series.

Salas returned full-time to Stock Car for the 2020 season, continuing his partnership with KTF Sports. He took his maiden pole position in the second visit to Goiânia. His maiden win came one round later at the same circuit. With an additional three podiums, he finished tenth in the championship.

In the 2021 season, Salas took one win on his way to 14th in the standings. He then improved to twelfth overall in 2022. He finished on the podium early in the 2023 season in Interlagos, and with another podium in Cascavel, he finished twelfth once again.

In 2024, Salas finished inside the points consistently for most of the season, barring a double retirement in Belo Horizonte. However, he was replaced by Gomes for the international rounds in Argentina and Uruguay, as he was no longer in contention for the championship. He returned in better form, finishing on the podium in Goiânia. He then took the final pole position of the season in Interlagos, and went on to win the feature race. With this victory, his third in the series, he finished 20th in the standings.

For the 2025 season, Salas left KTF Sports after six seasons and joined Cavaleiro Sports under the Cavaleiro Valda banner alongside Maurício, the same driver he scored his same Stock Car podium with in 2016. The season began strong with a third-place podium in the opening race, which he dedicated to his grandfather, who had recently passed away. In Cascavel, he finished on the podium once again in the sprint race. He took the lead of the championship in Velopark, where he claimed pole position and led every lap to win the shortened feature race.

=== Other touring car ventures ===
Salas joined three different touring car championships in Europe in 2019 alongside his Stock Light campaign. With Portuguese team Sports and you, he took part in a partial season of GT Cup Open Europe, and won the second Hungaroring race alongside countryman Marcio Basso. He also competed in the Monza round of TCR Europe Touring Car Series with Vuković Motorsport. Back in Brazil, he joined Pedro Aguiar for the endrance rounds of Porsche Cup Brasil, and finished second both in the race at Estoril and in the overall standings. He also made appearances in Império Endurance Brasil and Copa Truck, taking fastest lap on his debut in the latter.

Salas competed in the endrance rounds of the Porsche Cup Brasil in 2022, partnering Alceu Feldmann. The pair won the opening race of the season in Buenos Aires after Salas overtook Werner Neugebauer in the closing moments of the race.

In 2024, Salas joined Feldmann once again for the endurance rounds of the Porsche Cup Brasil. The pair won the 500km of Interlagos race and finished third in the endurance standings.

== Karting record ==
=== Karting career summary ===
Season	Series	Team	Position
2010	Seletiva de Kart Petrobras		2nd
2011	Seletiva de Kart Petrobras		3rd
2011	Super Kart Brasil – Shifter Kart		1st
2012	Seletiva de Kart Petrobras		10th
2012	SKUSA SuperNationals – KZ2	Tony Kart USA	26th

== Racing record ==
=== Racing career summary ===
Season	Series	Team	Races	Wins	Poles	F/Laps	Podiums	Points	Position
2011	Formula Future Fiat		12	2	0	0	3	98	4th
2013	Campeonato Brasileiro de Turismo	Racequip Competições	2	0	0	0	0	13	18th
2013	Sprint Race Brasil		16	5	5	8	10	277	**1st**
2014	Campeonato Brasileiro de Turismo	W2 Racing	12	6	5	2	8	195	**1st**
2014	Mercedes-Benz Challenge Brasil – CLA AMG Cup	Comark Racing	1	0	0	0	1	17	24th
2014	Sprint Race Brasil – Pro		2	1	1	2	2	41	8th
2015	Stock Car Brasil	Cavaleiro Racing	1	0	0	0	0	NC	NC
2015	Brasileiro de Marcas	Onze Motorsports	16	3	2	4	6	190	**3rd**
2016	Stock Car Brasil	Eurofarma RC	1	0	1	0	1	55	27th
2016	Stock Car Brasil	RZ Motorsport	5	0	0	0	0	55	27th
2016	Brasileiro de Marcas	Greco Competições	16	2	2	4	4	199	4th
2017	Stock Car Brasil	Vogel Motorsport	22	0	0	0	1	87	22nd
2017	Metropolitano de Cascavel – Marcas A		2	0	0	0	0	2	12th
2018	Stock Car Brasil	Bardahl Hot Car	10	0	0	0	0	4	33rd
2018	Stock Light	KTF Sports	1	1	0	0	1	60	16th
2018	Porsche Endurance Series – 3.8		1	0	1	1	1	104	10th
2018	International GT Open	BMW Team Teo Martín	4	0	0	0	0	0	47th
2019	Stock Car Brasil	KTF Sports	2	0	0	0	0	26	29th
2019	Stock Light	KTF Sports	15	7	6	6	9	295	**1st**
2019	Império Endurance Brasil – GT4	MC Tubarão	2	0	0	0	1	130	11th
2019	Porsche Endurance Series – 4.0		3	0	0	0	1	191	**2nd**
2019	Copa Truck	JL	2	0	0	1	0	8	26th
2019	GT Cup Open Europe	Sports and you	6	1	1	0	2	43	13th
2019	International GT Open	Sports and you	2	0	0	0	1	10	23rd
2019	TCR Europe Touring Car Series	Vuković Motorsport	2	0	0	0	0	0	45th
2020	Stock Car Brasil	KTF Sports	18	1	0	0	4	212	10th
2020	Porsche Endurance Series – Carrera Cup		3	1	1	0	1	186	**3rd**
2020	Império Endurance Brasil – GT3	Racing M3	2	0	0	1	1	120	5th
2020	Império Endurance Brasil – GT4	Racing M3	4	1	3	3	3	290	5th
2021	Stock Car Pro Series	KTF Sports	24	1	1	1	2	192	14th
2021	Porsche Endurance Series – Carrera Cup		3	1	0	1	2	155	4th
2021	Império Endurance Brasil – GT3	BOATM3 AMG	7	0	2	1	1	465	5th
2022	Stock Car Pro Series	KTF Racing	23	0	0	1	2	187	12th
2022	Porsche Endurance Series – Carrera Cup		3	2	0	0	2	161	**3rd**
2022	Império Endurance Brasil – GT3	Boat Racing M3	3	0	0	2	0	290	10th
2023	Stock Car Pro Series	KTF Racing	24	0	0	0	2	207	12th
2023	Porsche Endurance Series – Carrera Cup		1	0	0	0	0	106	7th
2023	Império Endurance Brasil – GT3	Boat M3	1	0	0	0	1	230	7th
2023	TCR South America Touring Car Championship	PMO Racing	1	0	0	1	0	4	51st
2023	TCR Brazil Touring Car Championship	PMO Racing	1	0	0	1	0	4	31st
2024	Stock Car Pro Series	KTF Racing	20	1	1	0	2	585	20th
2024	TCR South America Touring Car Championship	W2 ProGP	1	0	0	0	1	30	33rd
2024	TCR Brazil Touring Car Championship	W2 ProGP	1	0	0	0	1	30	18th
2024	Porsche Endurance Series – Carrera Cup		3	1	0	0	0	184	**3rd**
2025	Stock Car Pro Series	Cavaleiro Valda	5	1	1	0	3	243	**1st***
2026	Michelin Pilot Challenge - GS	Panam Motorsport							

* Season still in progress

=== Complete Stock Light results ===
(key) (Races in bold indicate pole position) (Races in italics indicate fastest lap)

Year	Team	1	2	3	4	5	6	7	8	9	10	11	12	13	14	15	DC	Points
2013	Racequip Competições	BRA1; 8	CAS1; Ret	RBP	CAS2	VEL	CUR	BRA1	INT								18th	13
2014	W2 Racing	**INT**; **1**; 1	**INT**; **2**; 1	SCZ; 1; 4	GOI1; 1 Ret	GOI1; 2; 11	**GOI2**; **1**; 1	**GOI2**; **2**; 1	CAS; 1	CUR; 1; 2	CUR; 2; 1	**VEL**; **1**; 12	TAR; 1; 2				1st	195
2018	KTF Sports	INT1; 1	INT1; 2	CUR; 1	CUR; 2	LON1; 1	LON1; 2	GOI; 1	GOI; 2	MS; 1	MS; 2	VCA; 1	VCA; 2	LON2; 1	LON2; 2	INT2; 1	16th	60
2019	KTF Sports	VEL; 1; 1	VEL; 2; 3	**GOI1**; **1**; 1	GOI1; 2; 1	**LON**; **1**; 1	LON; 2; 7	**INT1**; **1**; 1	INT1; 2; 22	**CUR**; **1**; 1	CUR; 2; 3	**CAS**; **1**; 13	CAS; 2; 4	GOI2; 1; 1	GOI2; 2; 4	**INT2**; Ret	1st	295

=== Complete Stock Car Pro Series results ===
(key) (Races in bold indicate pole position) (Races in italics indicate fastest lap)

Year	Team	1	2	3	4	5	6	7	8	9	10	11	12	13	14	15	16	17	18	19	20	21	22	23	24	25	DC	Points
2016	Eurofarma RC	**CUR1**; 3	VEL; 1	VEL; 2	GOI1; 1	GOI1; 2	SCZ; 1	SCZ; 2	TAR; 1	TAR; 2	CAS; 1	CAS; 2	INT1	LON; 1	LON; 2	CUR2; 1	CUR2; 2										27th	55
2016	RZ Motorsport																	GOI2; 1; 20	GOI2; 2; 10	CRI; 11	CRI; 19	INT2; 6					27th	55
2017	Vogel Motorsport	GOI1; 1; 14	GOI1; 2 Ret	VEL; 1; 22	VEL; 2; 10	SCZ; 1; 22	SCZ; 2 Ret	CAS; 1; 21	CAS; 2; 3	CUR; 10	CRI; 17	CRI; 19	VCA; 1; 25	VCA; 2; 12	LON; 1; 23	LON; 2; 13	BUE; 1; 13	BUE; 2; 23	TAR; 1 Ret	TAR; 2; 19	GOI2; 1; 16	GOI2; 2; 22	INT; 12				22nd	87
2018	Bardahl Hot Car	INT1; 10	CUR; 1; 18	CUR; 2 DNS	VEL; 1 Ret	VEL; 2 Ret	LON1; 1 Ret	LON1; 2 Ret	SCZ; 1 Ret	SCZ; 2; 17	GOI1; 16	MS; 1	MS; 2	CAS; 1	CAS; 2	VCA; 1	VCA; 2	LON2; 1	LON2; 2	GOI2; 1	GOI2; 2	INT2					33rd	4
2019	KTF Sports	VEL1	VCA; 1	VCA; 2	GOI1; 1	GOI1; 2	LON; 1	LON; 2	SCZ; 1	SCZ; 2	MS; 1	MS; 2	INT1	VEL2; 1	VEL2; 2	CAS; 1	CAS; 2	VCA; 1	VCA; 2	GOI2; 1; 8	GOI2; 2; 9	INT2					29th	26
2020	KTF Sports	GOI1; 1; 13	GOI1; 2; 11	INT1; Ret	INT2; 7	LON; 1 Ret	LON; 2 Ret	CAS1 15	CAS2; 1; 9	CAS2; 2; 15	VCA; 1; 6	VCA; 2; 11	CUR1; 2	CUR2; 1; 2	CUR2; 2 Ret	**GOI2**; 2	GOI3; 1; 1	GOI3; 2 Ret	INT3; 10								10th	212
2021	KTF Sports	GOI1; 1; 9	GOI1; 2; 9	INT1; 1; 26	INT1; 2; 3	VCA1; 1; 10	VCA1; 2; 18	VCA2; 1; 9	VCA2; 2; 7	CAS; 1; 27	CAS; 2; 5	CUR1; 1; 11	CUR1; 2; 18	CUR2; 1; 4	CUR2; 2; 25	GOI2; 1 Ret	GOI2; 2 DNS	GOI3; 1; 20	GOI3; 2 Ret	**VCA3**; **1**; 1	VCA3; 2; 7	SCZ; 1; 21	SCZ; 2 Ret	INT2; 1 DSQ	INT2; 2; 9		14th	192
2022	KTF Racing	INT1; 15	GOI1; 1; 24	GOI1; 2; 14	RIO; 1; 7	RIO; 2; 7	VCA1; 1; 5	VCA1; 2; 13	VEL1; 1; 9	VEL1; 2; 3	VEL2; 1; 18	VEL2; 2; 6	INT2; 1; 3	INT2; 2 Ret	VCA2; 1 Ret	VCA2; 2 Ret	SCZ; 1; 24	SCZ; 2 Ret	GOI2; 1; 14	GOI2; 2; 14	GOI3; 1; 24	GOI3; 2 '4	INT3; 1; 11	INT3; 2; 8			12th	187
2023	KTF Racing	GOI1; 1; 20	GOI1; 2; 15	INT1; 1; 2	INT1; 2; 15	TAR; 1; 10	TAR; 2; 8	CAS1; 1; 10	CAS1; 2; 10	INT2; 1; 11	INT2; 2; 15	VCA1; 1; 8	VCA1; 2; 10	GOI2; 1 Ret	GOI2; 2 Ret	VEL; 1; 4	VEL; 2; 5	BUE; 1; 5	BUE; 2; 8	VCA2; 1 DSQ	VCA2; 2; 24	CAS2; 1; 3	CAS2; 2; 20	INT3; 1; 23	INT3; 2 Ret		12th	207
2024	KTF Racing	GOI1; 1; 10	GOI1; 2; 11	VCA1; 1; 21	VCA1; 2 C	INT1; 1; 4	INT1; 2; 27	CAS; 1; 9	CAS; 2; 8	VCA2; 1; 13	VCA2; 2; 5	VCA2; 3; 5	GOI2; 1; 21	GOI2; 2; 21	BLH; 1 Ret	BLH; 2 Ret	VEL; 1; 17	VEL; 2; 15	BUE; 1	BUE; 2	ELP; 1	ELP; 2	GOI3; 1; 19	GOI3; 2; 3	INT2; 1; 12	**INT2**; **2**; 1	20th	585
2025	Valda Cavaleiro Sports	INT1; 3	CAS1; 1; 3	CAS1; 2; 4	VEL; 1; 5	**VEL**; **2**; 1	VCA1; 1	VCA1; 2	BLH; 1	BLH; 2	CAS2; 1	CAS2; 2	VCA2; 1	VCA2; 2	VCA3; 1	VCA3; 2	TBA	TBA	GOI; 1	GOI; 2	BRA; 1	BRA; 2	INT2; 1	INT2; 2			1st*	243*

* Season still in progress
