= 2013 Campeonato Brasileiro de Turismo season =

Car racing competition

Seasons
- ← 2012 2014 →

The 2013 Campeonato Brasileiro de Turismo (Brazilian Touring Championship) (officially the 2013 Troféu Dolly) also known as Stock Car Brasil Light was the first season of the new Stock Car Brasil second tier championship replacing Copa Chevrolet Montana. The chassis, designed by JL company is similar that used in Stock Car Brasil with V8 engine.

== Teams and drivers ==
- All cars are powered by V8 engines and use JL chassis. All drivers were Brazilian-registered.

Team	No.	Driver	Rounds
Scuderia 111	1	Marco Túlio Souza	2
Scuderia 111	9	Guilherme Figueiroa	1
Scuderia 111	9	Andersom Toso	5
Scuderia 111	38	Rogério Motta	8
Scuderia 111	77	Daniel Kaefer	4
Hot Car	2	Mauri Zaccarelli	All
Hot Car	11	Pedro Boesel	All
Motortech Competições	3	Tito Morestoni	All
Motortech Competições	17	Luiz Sena, Jr.	1–2
Motortech Competições	20	Wagner Ebrahim	3–7
Motortech Competições	31	Marcio Campos	8
RKL Competições	4	Marcos Garcia	4
RKL Competições	8	Guilherme Sperafico	4
RKL Competições	16	Carlos Kray	5
RKL Competições	17	Luiz Sena, Jr.	5, 7
RKL Competições	33	Duda Bana	2
RKL Competições	50	Renato Braga	8
RKL Competições	99	Carlos Eduardo	4, 6–8
Nascar Motorsport	5	Felipe Tozzo	1–6
Nascar Motorsport	22	Felipe Neira	7–8
Nascar Motorsport	44	Norberto Gresse	All
Racequip Competições	7	Guilherme Salas	1–2
Racequip Competições	35	Luiz Rodrigo de Souza	8
Racequip Competições	79	João Victor Horto	8
Carlos Alves J. Star	16	Marcelo Hahn	1
Carlos Alves J. Star	23	Marco Cozzi	All
Carlos Alves Competições	26	Raphael Abbate	All
Carlos Alves Competições	83	Gabriel Casagrande	All
J. Star Racing	32	Fernando Fortes	All
J. Star Racing	35	Luiz Rodrigo de Souza	7
J. Star Racing	36	Flavio Matheus	8
J. Star Racing	55	Raphael Teixeira	8
J. Star Racing	88	Leandro Romera	1–6
Mottin Racing	46	Luiz Ribeiro	All
Mottin Racing	56	João Pretto	All
W2 Racing	71	Fábio Carreira	All
W2 Racing	80	Felipe Fraga	All

== Race calendar and results ==
The calendar was released on 11 February 2013. All races were held in Brazil.

Round	Circuit	Date	Pole position	Fastest lap	Winning driver	Winning team
1	Autódromo Internacional Nelson Piquet	June 2	Felipe Fraga	Felipe Fraga	Felipe Fraga	W2 Racing
2	Autódromo Internacional de Cascavel	June 16	Felipe Fraga	Felipe Fraga	Felipe Fraga	W2 Racing
3	Ribeirão Preto Street Circuit	August 11	Felipe Fraga	João Pretto	Felipe Fraga	W2 Racing
4	Autódromo Internacional de Cascavel	September 1	Felipe Fraga	Marco Cozzi	Marco Cozzi	Carlos Alves J. Star
5	Velopark, Nova Santa Rita	September 15	Felipe Fraga	Felipe Fraga	Marco Cozzi	Carlos Alves J. Star
6	Autódromo Internacional de Curitiba	October 20	Felipe Fraga	Felipe Fraga	Felipe Fraga	W2 Racing
7	Autódromo Internacional Nelson Piquet	November 10	Fabio Carreira	Felipe Fraga	Gabriel Casagrande	Carlos Alves Competições
8	Autódromo José Carlos Pace	December 15	Fabio Carreira	Felipe Fraga	Marco Cozzi	Carlos Alves J. Star

== Championship standings ==
- Points were awarded as follows:

Position	1	2	3	4	5	6	7	8	9	10	11	12	13	14	15	16	17	18	19	20
Standard	24	20	18	17	16	15	14	13	12	11	10	9	8	7	6	5	4	3	2	1
Round 8	48	40	36	34	32	30	28	26	24	22	20	18	16	14	12	10	8	6	4	2

=== Drivers' Championship ===
Pos	Driver	BRA	CAS	RBP	CAS	VEL	CUR	BRA	INT	Pts
1	Felipe Fraga	**1**	**1**	**1**	**9**	**Ret**	**1**	2	5	160
2	Marco Cozzi	Ret	6	8	1	1	3	4	1	159
3	Gabriel Casagrande	2	2	2	2	Ret	9	1	6	146
4	Pedro Boesel	3	4	4	3	5	14	5	12	133
5	Fabio Carreira	Ret	9	Ret	Ret	7	2	**3**	**2**	104
6	Mauri Zaccarelli	6	Ret	5	10	3	Ret	7	8	102
7	João Pretto	Ret	3	Ret	5	Ret	5	6	3	101
8	Raphael Abbate	4	11	Ret	12	4	10	14	11	97
9	Luiz Ribeiro	10	12	7	Ret	Ret	11	12	4	87
10	Tito Morestoni	13	5	6	6	6	15	10	Ret	86
11	Norberto Gresse	7	7	3	Ret	2	7	Ret	Ret	80
12	Wagner Ebrahim			9	4	9	6	9		68
13	Fernando Fortes	9	8	Ret	7	Ret	Ret	11	Ret	49
14	Leandro Romera	Ret	Ret	Ret	8	Ret	4			30
15	Felipe Tozzo	5	Ret	Ret	Ret	Ret	8			29
16	Luiz Sena, Jr.	Ret	10			Ret	13			19
17	Carlos Eduardo				Ret		12	15	Ret	15
18	Guilherme Salas	8	Ret							13
18	Felipe Neira							8	Ret	13
18	Andersom Toso					8				13
21	Guilherme Figueiroa	11								10
21	Guilherme Sperafico				11					10
23	Marcelo Hahn	12								9
24	Marco Garcia					13				8
	Luiz Rodrigo de Souza							Ret	NC	0
	Duda Bana		Ret							0
	Marco Túlio Souza		Ret							0
	Daniel Kaefer				Ret					0
	Carlos Kray					Ret				0
Drivers ineligible for points
	João Victor Horto								7	0
	Renato Braga								9	0
	Flávio Matheus								10	0
	Marcio Campos								13	0
	Raphael Teixeira								Ret	0
	Rogerio Motta								DSQ	0
Pos	Driver	BRA	CAS	RBP	CAS	VEL	CUR	BRA	INT	Pts

Colour	Result
Gold	Winner
Silver	Second place
Bronze	Third place
Green	Points classification
Blue	Non-points classification
Blue	Non-classified finish (NC)
Purple	Retired, not classified (Ret)
Red	Did not qualify (DNQ)
Red	Did not pre-qualify (DNPQ)
Black	Disqualified (DSQ)
White	Did not start (DNS)
White	Withdrew (WD)
White	Race cancelled (C)
Blank	Did not practice (DNP)
Blank	Did not arrive (DNA)
Blank	Excluded (EX)

**Bold** – Pole
Italics – Fastest Lap

=== Teams' Championship ===
Pos	Team	BRA	CAS	RBP	CAS	VEL	CUR	BRA	INT	Pts
1	W2 Racing	1	1	1	9	7	1	2	2	254
1	W2 Racing	Ret	9	Ret	Ret	7	2	3	5	254
2	Carlos Alves Competições	2	2	2	2	4	9	1	6	237
2	Carlos Alves Competições	4	11	Ret	12	Ret	10	14	11	237
3	Hot Car	3	4	4	3	3	14	5	8	227
3	Hot Car	6	Ret	5	10	5	Ret	7	12	227
4	Mottin Racing	10	3	7	5	Ret	5	6	3	188
4	Mottin Racing	Ret	12	Ret	Ret	Ret	11	12	4	188
5	Motortech Competições	13	5	6	4	6	8	9	13	181
5	Motortech Competições	Ret	10	9	6	9	15	10	Ret	181
6	Carlos Alves J. Star	12	6	8	1	1	3	4	1	168
6	Carlos Alves J. Star	Ret								168
7	Nascar Motorsport	5	7	3	Ret	2	7	8	Ret	122
7	Nascar Motorsport	7	Ret	Ret	Ret	Ret	8	Ret	Ret	122
8	J. Star Racing	9	8	Ret	7	Ret	4	11	10	101
8	J. Star Racing	Ret	Ret	Ret	8	Ret	Ret	Ret	Ret	101
9	RKL Competições		Ret		11	Ret	12	13	9	65
9	RKL Competições				Ret	Ret	13	15	Ret	65
10	Racequip Competições	8	Ret						7	41
10	Racequip Competições								NC	41
11	Scuderia 111	11	Ret		Ret	8			DSQ	23
Pos	Team	BRA	CAS	RBP	CAS	VEL	CUR	CAS	INT	Pts

Colour	Result
Gold	Winner
Silver	Second place
Bronze	Third place
Green	Points classification
Blue	Non-points classification
Blue	Non-classified finish (NC)
Purple	Retired, not classified (Ret)
Red	Did not qualify (DNQ)
Red	Did not pre-qualify (DNPQ)
Black	Disqualified (DSQ)
White	Did not start (DNS)
White	Withdrew (WD)
White	Race cancelled (C)
Blank	Did not practice (DNP)
Blank	Did not arrive (DNA)
Blank	Excluded (EX)

**Bold** – Pole
Italics – Fastest Lap
