= Mil Milhas Brasil =

- Venue: Interlagos Circuit
- Location: Interlagos
- First race: 1956
- Last race: 2024
- Most wins (driver): Zeca Giaffone (5)

The Mil Milhas Brasil (also known as the Mil Milhas Brasileiras or 1000 Miles of Brazil in Portuguese) is a sports car endurance race held annually in Brazil since 1956.

The Mil Milhas has been held nearly every year since its inception and is one of the longest running motor racing events in Brazil. Nearly every running has used the Interlagos circuit, but the 1997 and 1999 events were held at Brasília and Curitiba respectively.

Zeca Giaffone holds the record of most wins, having won in 1981, 1984, 1986, 1988 and 1989.

== History ==
The first Mil Milhas was organized by Eloy Gogliano and Wilson Fittipaldi Sr., the father of racing drivers Emerson Fittipaldi and Wilson Fittipaldi Júnior. Fittipaldi and Gogliano were inspired to found the race after seeing the 1949 Italian Mille Miglia. The first event was held on November 24–25, 1956, with 31 cars competing at the Interlagos circuit.

The race was held at Interlagos from 1956 to 1996. It was held at Brasília in 1997, before returning to Interlagos the following year. The race was held in Curitiba in 1999. It returned to Interlagos in 2001, and has been held there ever since.

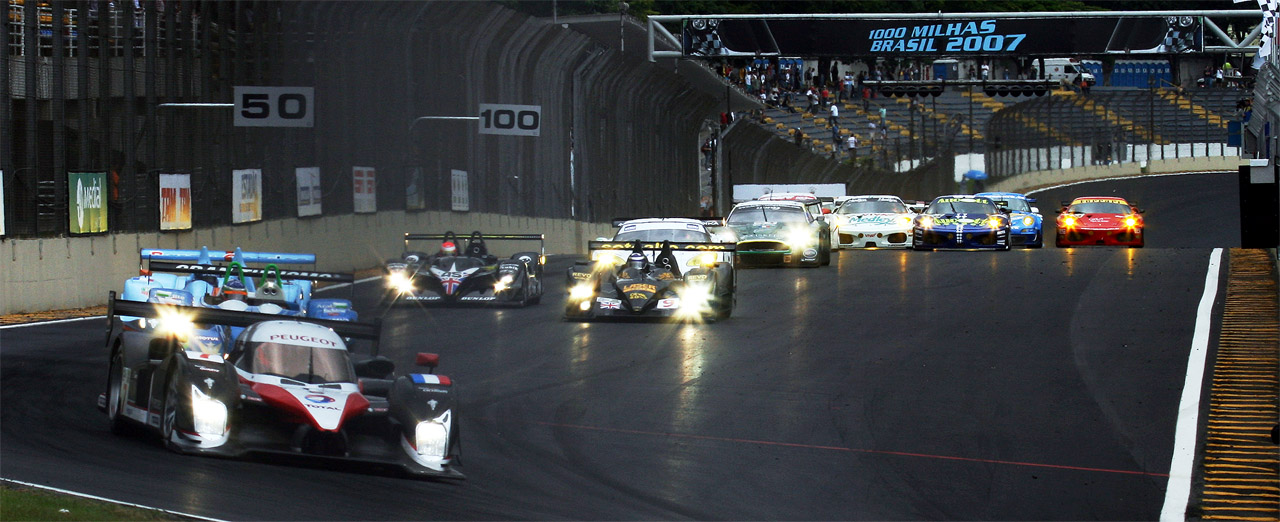
Start of Mil Milhas Brasil in 2007

In 2007, the race was held as a part of the Le Mans Series, the first time the race had been part of an international championship. The event had previously been supported as a non-championship event in the BPR Global GT Series as well as the FIA GT Championship. FIA GT planned to add the event to their calendar in 2007, but chose to hand the event instead to Le Mans Series organizers.

== Results ==
=== Winners on 8 km Interlagos track (1956–1989) ===
Year	Drivers	Car
1956	(Brazil) Catarino Andreatta (Brazil) Breno Fornari	Carretera Ford
1957	(Brazil) Aristides Bertuol (Brazil) Orlando Menegaz	Carretera Chevrolet
1958	(Brazil) Catarino Andreatta (Brazil) Breno Fornari	Carretera Ford
1959	(Brazil) Catarino Andreatta (Brazil) Breno Fornari	Carretera Ford
1960	(Brazil) Chico Landi (Brazil) Christian Heins	Alfa Romeo JK 2000
1961	(Brazil) Italo Bertão (Brazil) Orlando Menegaz	Chevrolet Corvette
1962 –1964	Not held	
1965	(Brazil) Justino de Maio (Brazil) Victoria Azzalin	Carretera Chevrolet
1966	(Brazil) Camilo Christófaro (Brazil) Eduardo Celidônio	Chevrolet Corvette
1967	(Brazil) Luiz Bueno (Brazil) Luiz Terra Smith	Interlagos Mark 1
1968 –1969	Not held	
1970	(Brazil) Abílio Diniz (Brazil) Alcides Diniz	Alfa Romeo GTA 2000
1971 –1972	Not held	
1973	(Brazil) Bird Clemente (Brazil) Nilson Clemente	Ford Maverick 4800
1974 –1980	Not held	
1981	(Brazil) Zeca Giaffone (Brazil) Affonso Giaffone Filho (Brazil) Chico Serra	Chevrolet Opala Stock Car
1982	Not held	
1983	(Brazil) Fausto Wajchenberg (Brazil) Vicente Corrêa (Brazil) Valdir Silva	Volkswagen Passat
1984	(Brazil) Zeca Giaffone (Brazil) Reinaldo Campello (Brazil) Maurizio Sandro Sala	Chevrolet Opala Stock Car
1985	(Brazil) Paulo Gomes (Brazil) Fábio Sotto Mayor	Chevrolet Opala Stock Car
1986	(Brazil) Zeca Giaffone (Brazil) Affonso Giaffone Filho (Brazil) Walter Travaglini	Chevrolet Opala Stock Car
1987	(Brazil) Luís Pereira (Brazil) Marcos Gracia	Chevrolet Opala Stock Car
1988	(Brazil) Zeca Giaffone (Brazil) Luís Pereira (Brazil) Walter Travaglini	Chevrolet Opala Stock Car
1989	(Brazil) Zeca Giaffone (Brazil) Walter Travaglini	Chevrolet Opala Stock Car

=== Winners on 4.3 km Interlagos track (1990–1996) ===
Year	Drivers	Car
1990	(Brazil) Carlos Alves (Brazil) José Carlos Dias	Chevrolet Opala Stock Car
1991	Not held	
1992	(Brazil) Klaus Heitkotter (Germany) Jurgen Weis (Germany) Marc Gindorf	BMW M3 2300
1993	(Brazil) Antônio Hermann (Austria) Franz Konrad (Germany) Franz Prangemeier	Porsche 911
1994	(Brazil) Wilson Fittipaldi (Brazil) Christian Fittipaldi	Porsche 911 RSR
1995	(Brazil) Wilson Fittipaldi (Brazil) Antônio Hermann (Austria) Franz Konrad	Porsche 911
1996	(Brazil) André Lara Resende (Brazil) Roberto Keller (Brazil) Roberto Aranha	Porsche 911

=== Winners 1997–2000 ===
Year	Drivers	Car	Track
1997	(Brazil) Nelson Piquet (Venezuela) Johnny Cecotto (United Kingdom) Steve Soper	McLaren F1 GTR	Brasília
1998	(Brazil) Tom Stefani (Brazil) André Grillo (Brazil) Júlio Fernandes	AS Vectra 2.0	Interlagos
1999	(Brazil) Beto Borghesi (Brazil) Jair Bana (Brazil) Luciano Borghesi	Aldee AP-2000	Curitiba
2000	Not held		

=== Winners on Interlagos track (2001–2008) ===
Year	Drivers	Car
2001	(Brazil) André Lara Resende (Brazil) Régis Schuch (Brazil) Max Wilson (Brazil) Flávio Trindade	Porsche 911 GT3
2002	(Brazil) Régis Schuch (Brazil) Flávio Trindade (Brazil) Raul Boesel	Porsche 911 GT3
2003	(Brazil) Ingo Hoffmann (Brazil) Xandy Negrão (Brazil) Ricardo Etchenique (Brazil) Fernando Nabuco	Porsche 911 GT3
2004	(Italy) Stefano Zonca (Italy) Angelo Lancelotti (Italy) Fabrizio Gollin	Dodge Viper GTS-R
2005	(Brazil) Xandy Negrão (Brazil) Xandynho Negrão (Brazil) Guto Negrão (Brazil) Giuliano Losacco	Audi TT DTM
2006	(Brazil) Nelson Piquet (Brazil) Nelson Piquet Jr. (France) Christophe Bouchut (Brazil) Hélio Castroneves	Aston Martin DBR9
2007	(France) Nicolas Minassian (Spain) Marc Gené	Peugeot 908 HDi FAP
2008	(Brazil) Raul Boesel (Brazil) Max Wilson (Brazil) Marcel Visconde	Porsche 911 GT3 RSR

=== 2009–2019 ===
2009–2019	Not held

The race was not held in the decade 2009–2019

=== Winners since 2020 ===
Year	Drivers	Car
2020	(Brazil) Esio Vichiese (Brazil) Renan Guerra (United Kingdom) Stuart Turvey	Ginetta G55 GT4
2021	(Brazil) Jose Vilela (Brazil) Leandro Totti (Brazil) Eduardo Pimenta (Brazil) Gustavo Ghizzo (Brazil) Leonardo Yoshi	Protótipo MCR 2.1
2022	(Brazil) Jindra Kraucher (Brazil) Aldo Piedade Jr (Brazil) Beto Ribeiro	Sigma P1 G4
2023	(Brazil) Fernando Fortes (Brazil) Henrique Assunção (Brazil) Emílio Padron (Brazil) Fernando Ohashi	Metalmoro JLM AJR
2024	(Brazil) Ricardo Maurício (Brazil) Marcel Visconde (Brazil) Marçal Müller	Porsche 911 GT3 R
2025	(Brazil) Pietro Rimbano (Brazil) Henrique Assunção (Brazil) Christian Robert Rocha	Metalmoro JLM AJR
2026	(Brazil) Rafa Brocchi (Brazil) André Moraes Jr. (Brazil) Flávio Abrunhosa (Brazil) Daniel Lancaster	Ligier JS P320
