= 2014 Campeonato Brasileiro de Turismo season =

Car racing competition

The 2014 Troféo Dolly Campeonato Brasileiro de Turismo (Brazilian Touring Championship) also known as Stock Car Brasil Light is the second season of the new Stock Car Brasil second tier championship replacing Copa Chevrolet Montana.

== Teams and drivers ==
- All cars are powered by V8 engines and use JL chassis. All drivers were Brazilian-registered.

| Team | No. | Driver | Rounds |
|---|---|---|---|
| HPN Racing Team | 0 | Renato Constantino | 4–5 |
| HPN Racing Team | 22 | Felipe Neira | 1–3 |
| HPN Racing Team | 30 | Rogério Castro | 4–5 |
| HPN Racing Team | 37 | Renan Guerra | 1–3 |
| Mottin Racing | 2 | Mauri Zaccarelli | 12 |
| Mottin Racing | 3 | Tito Morestoni | 1–5 |
| Mottin Racing | 11 | Pedro Boesel | 8–10 |
| Mottin Racing | 18 | Beto Giacomello | 8 |
| Mottin Racing | 35 | Gabriel Robe | 6–7, 11–12 |
| Mottin Racing | 43 | Gustavo Martins | 9–10 |
| Mottin Racing | 43 | Vicente Orige | 9–10 |
| Mottin Racing | 56 | João Pretto | 1–7 |
| Mottin Racing | 70 | Pedro Barbosa | 11 |
| Hitech Racing | 2 | Mauri Zaccarelli | 1–11 |
| Hitech Racing | 22 | Felipe Guimarães | 12 |
| Hitech Racing | 77 | Pedro Saderi | All |
| R. Sports Racing | 3 | Tito Morestoni | 6–12 |
| R. Sports Racing | 11 | Pedro Boesel | 1–5 |
| R. Sports Racing | 88 | Edson Coelho Júnior | All |
| RKL Competições | 4 | Luis Ribeiro | 3 |
| RKL Competições | 13 | Rodrigo Gil | 1–2, 9–10 |
| RKL Competições | 13 | Rodrigo Bonora | 1–3, 9–10 |
| RKL Competições | 30 | Rogério Castro | 6–7 |
| RKL Competições | 38 | Rogério Motta | 1–2 |
| RKL Competições | 45 | Giuseppe Vecchi | 4–5 |
| RKL Competições | 55 | Renato Braga | 4–7, 9–11 |
| J. Star Racing | 7 | Rodrigo Pimenta | 1–7 |
| J. Star Racing | 32 | Fernando Fortes | All |
| J. Star Racing | 69 | Gustavo Myasava | 8–12 |
| Nascar Motorsport | 11 | Pedro Boesel | 6–7 |
| Nascar Motorsport | 12 | Ney Faustini | 1–2 |
| Nascar Motorsport | 44 | Norberto Gresse | All |
| Nascar Motorsport | 79 | Adibe Marques | 4–5 |
| Nascar Motorsport | 82 | Rafael Iserhard | 3 |
| W2 Racing | 17 | Guilherme Salas | All |
| W2 Racing | 26 | Raphael Abbate | All |
| Carlos Alves Competições | 23 | Marco Cozzi | All |
| Carlos Alves Competições | 36 | Flávio Matheus | All |
| Motortech Competições | 27 | Christian Castro | All |
| Motortech Competições | 31 | Marcio Campos | All |
| Voxx Racing | 79 | Adibe Marques | 6–12 |

== Race calendar and results ==
All races were held in Brazil.

| Round | Circuit | Date | Pole position | Fastest lap | Winning driver | Winning team |
|---|---|---|---|---|---|---|
| 1 | Autódromo José Carlos Pace | March 22 | Guilherme Salas | Marco Cozzi | Guilherme Salas | W2 Racing |
| 2 | Autódromo José Carlos Pace | March 23 | | Edson Coelho Júnior | Guilherme Salas | W2 Racing |
| 3 | Autódromo Internacional de Santa Cruz do Sul | April 13 | João Pretto | Pedro Boesel | Raphael Abbate | W2 Racing |
| 4 | Autódromo Internacional Ayrton Senna | May 31 | João Pretto | João Pretto | Marcio Campos | Motortech Competições |
| 5 | Autódromo Internacional Ayrton Senna | June 1 | | Marcio Campos | Marcio Campos | Motortech Competições |
| 6 | Autódromo Internacional Ayrton Senna | August 2 | Guilherme Salas | Guilherme Salas | Guilherme Salas | W2 Racing |
| 7 | Autódromo Internacional Ayrton Senna | August 3 | | Guilherme Salas | Guilherme Salas | W2 Racing |
| 8 | Autodromo Internacional de Cascavel | August 17 | Raphael Abbate | Flávio Matheus | Guilherme Salas | W2 Racing |
| 9 | Autodromo Internacional de Curitiba | August 30 | Marco Cozzi | Marco Cozzi | Marco Cozzi | Carlos Alves Competições |
| 10 | Autodromo Internacional de Curitiba | August 31 | | Marco Cozzi | Guilherme Salas | W2 Racing |
| 11 | Velopark, Nova Santa Rita | September 14 | Guilherme Salas | Marcio Campos | Raphael Abbate | W2 Racing |
| 12 | Autódromo Internacional de Tarumã | November 2 | Christian Castro | Fernando Fortes | Christian Castro | Motortech Competições |

== Championship standings ==
Points system

Points were awarded for each race at an event, to the driver/s of a car that completed at least 75% of the race distance and was running at the completion of the race, up to a maximum of 48 points per event.

| Points format | Position | | | | | | | | | | | | | | | | | | | |
| Points format | 1st | 2nd | 3rd | 4th | 5th | 6th | 7th | 8th | 9th | 10th | 11th | 12th | 13th | 14th | 15th | 16th | 17th | 18th | 19th | 20th |
|---|---|---|---|---|---|---|---|---|---|---|---|---|---|---|---|---|---|---|---|---|
| Feature races | 24 | 20 | 18 | 17 | 16 | 15 | 14 | 13 | 12 | 11 | 10 | 9 | 8 | 7 | 6 | 5 | 4 | 3 | 2 | 1 |
| Qualifying races | 15 | 13 | 12 | 11 | 10 | 9 | 8 | 7 | 6 | 5 | 4 | 3 | 2 | 1 | 0 | 0 | 0 | 0 | 0 | 0 |
| Final race | 48 | 40 | 36 | 34 | 32 | 30 | 28 | 26 | 24 | 22 | 20 | 18 | 16 | 14 | 12 | 10 | 8 | 6 | 4 | 2 |

- Qualifying races: Used for the first of each event.
- Feature races: Used for the second race of each event and singles round.
- Final race: Used for the last round of the season with double points.

=== Drivers' Championship ===
| Pos | Driver | INT | | SCZ | GOI | | GOI | | CAS | CUR | | VEL | TAR‡ | Pts |
|---|---|---|---|---|---|---|---|---|---|---|---|---|---|---|
| 1 | Guilherme Salas | **1** | **1** | 4 | Ret | 11 | **1** | **1** | 1 | 2 | 1 | **12** | 2 | 195 |
| 2 | Raphael Abbate | 15 | 6 | 1 | 2 | 5 | 3 | 5 | **12** | 4 | 3 | 1 | 4 | 175 |
| 3 | Marcio Campos | 11 | 12 | 3 | 1 | **1** | 4 | 4 | 2 | 3 | 2 | 8 | Ret | 163 |
| 4 | Edson Coelho Júnior | 2 | 2 | 11 | 3 | 2 | 6 | 3 | 5 | 15 | 6 | Ret | 3 | 151 |
| 5 | Marco Cozzi | Ret | 5 | 9 | 4 | 6 | 2 | 2 | 3 | **1** | **16** | 11 | 7 | 149 |
| 6 | Christian Castro | 7 | 16 | 8 | 6 | 14 | 8 | 8 | Ret | 6 | 5 | 10 | **1** | 122 |
| 7 | Flávio Matheus | 13 | 7 | 7 | Ret | 4 | 5 | 7 | 11 | DSQ | 9 | 4 | 12 | 119 |
| 8 | Tito Morestoni | 8 | 13 | Ret | 12 | Ret | 7 | 6 | 4 | 7 | 10 | 3 | 8 | 108 |
| 9 | Pedro Saderi | 6 | Ret | 10 | 7 | 10 | Ret | 11 | 7 | 9 | 11 | 9 | 9 | 103 |
| 10 | Norberto Gresse | 8 | 4 | Ret | Ret | 7 | 13 | Ret | 6 | 5 | 4 | Ret | 6 | 100 |
| 11 | Pedro Boesel | 3 | 3 | 5 | 5 | 3 | 12 | 12 | Ret | 12 | Ret | | | 89 |
| 12 | Fernando Fortes | 10 | 17 | 6 | Ret | 8 | 17 | 9 | DSQ | 8 | 7 | 6 | DSQ | 85 |
| 13 | Mauri Zaccarelli | 4 | 10 | Ret | 8 | Ret | 10 | 15 | Ret | 10 | 12 | 5 | DSQ | 70 |
| 14 | Adibe Marques | | | | 9 | 15 | Ret | 13 | 9 | 11 | 15 | Ret | 11 | 52 |
| 15 | João Pretto | 16 | 8 | **2** | **Ret** | 9 | 14 | Ret | | | | | | 46 |
| 16 | Gustavo Myasava | | | | | | | | 8 | 14 | 13 | Ret | 10 | 33 |
| 17 | Rodrigo Pimenta | Ret | 9 | Ret | Ret | 12 | 9 | Ret | | | | | | 27 |
| 18 | Gabriel Robe | | | | | | 15 | Ret | | | | 2 | Ret | 20 |
| 18 | Rogério Castro | | | | 11 | Ret | 11 | 10 | | | | | | 20 |
| 20 | Renato Braga | | | | 11 | Ret | 16 | 14 | | Ret | 14 | Ret | | 18 |
| 21 | Felipe Guimarães | | | | | | | | | | | | 5 | 16 |
| 22 | Pedro Barbosa | | | | | | | | | | | 7 | | 14 |
| 22 | Renan Guerra | Ret | 15 | 13 | | | | | | | | | | 14 |
| 24 | Gustavo Martins | | | | | | | | | Ret | 8* | | | 13 |
| 24 | Vicente Orige | | | | | | | | | Ret* | 8 | | | 13 |
| 25 | Beto Giacomello | | | | | | | | 10 | | | | | 11 |
| 26 | Rogério Motta | Ret | 11 | | | | | | | | | | | 10 |
| 26 | Rodrigo Gil | 14 | 14* | | | | | | | 13 | Ret | | | 10 |
| 28 | Rafael Iserhard | | | 12 | | | | | | | | | | 9 |
| 29 | Renato Constantino | | | | Ret | 13 | | | | | | | | 8 |
| 29 | Rodrigo Bonora | 14* | 14 | Ret | | | | | | | | | | 8 |
| 31 | Felipe Neira | 9 | Ret | Ret | | | | | | | | | | 6 |
| 31 | Ney Faustini | 12 | 18 | | | | | | | | | | | 6 |
| | Luis Ribeiro | | | Ret | | | | | | | | | | |
| | Giuseppe Vecchi | | | | Ret | Ret | | | | | | | | |
| Pos | Driver | INT | | SCZ | GOI | | GOI | | CAS | CUR | | VEL | TAR | Pts |

| Colour | Result |
|---|---|
| Gold | Winner |
| Silver | Second place |
| Bronze | Third place |
| Green | Points classification |
| Blue | Non-points classification |
| Blue | Non-classified finish (NC) |
| Purple | Retired, not classified (Ret) |
| Red | Did not qualify (DNQ) |
| Red | Did not pre-qualify (DNPQ) |
| Black | Disqualified (DSQ) |
| White | Did not start (DNS) |
| White | Withdrew (WD) |
| White | Race cancelled (C) |
| Blank | Did not practice (DNP) |
| Blank | Did not arrive (DNA) |
| Blank | Excluded (EX) |

**Bold** - Pole position
Italics — Fastest lap
* — Driver did not race, but scored points with partner.

- Notes:

^{‡} Half points were awarded for the Tarumã race as less than 75% of the race distance had been completed
