= 2019 Stock Light season =

Car racing competition

The 2019 Stock Light is the sixteenth season of Stock Light.

== Teams and drivers ==
- All cars were powered by V8 engines and used the JL chassis. All drivers were Brazilian-registered.

Team	No.	Driver	Rounds
KTF Sports	1	(Brazil) Erik Mayrink	1-6
KTF Sports	85	(Brazil) Guilherme Salas	1-6
Motortech Competições	3	(Brazil) André Moraes Jr	1-4
Motortech Competições	31	(Brazil) Marcio Campos	1-6
Motortech Competições	35	(Brazil) Gabriel Robe	5-6
Carlos Alves Competições	8	(Brazil) Lukas Moraes	1-6
Carlos Alves Competições	22	(Brazil) Gabriel Lusquiños	1-6
Crown Racing Junior	11	(Brazil) Pedro Boesel	1-6
Crown Racing Junior	34	(Brazil) Matheus Iorio	1-6
MRF Racing	12	(Brazil) Lauro Traldi	1-4
MRF Racing	15	(Brazil) Leonardo Sanchez	1-6
W2 Shell V-Power	13	(Brazil) Diego Ramos	1-6
W2 Shell V-Power	77	(Brazil) Raphael Reis	1-6
MRF Motorsport	18	(Brazil) Gustavo Myasava	1-6
MRF Motorsport	35	(Brazil) Gabriel Robe	1-3
MRF Motorsport	71	(Brazil) Lucas Daleffe	6
Motorfast Racing	79	(Brazil) Rodrigo Gil	5
R Sports	17	(Brazil) Pietro Rimbano	1-6
R Sports	19	(Brazil) Felipe Papazissis	1-3
R Sports	37	(Brazil) Raphael Teixeira	5-6
SG Racing	21	(Brazil) Vitor Baptista	1
SG Racing	23	(Brazil) Marco Cozzi	1-3
SG Racing	37	(Brazil) Raphael Teixeira	2-3
SG Racing	73	(Brazil) Francesco Franciosi	2
SG Racing	19	(Brazil) Felipe Papazissis	4-6
SG Racing	35	(Brazil) Gabriel Robe	4
SG Racing	3	(Brazil) André Moraes Jr.	5-6
L3 Motorsport	26	(Brazil) Raphael Abbate	1-6
Motortech Motorsport	46	(Brazil) Tuca Antoniazzi	1-2, 4-5
RKL Competições	52	(Brazil) Pedro Caland	2-6
RKL Competições	86	(Brazil) Gustavo Frigotto	1-6
TMG Light Team	79	(Brazil) Rodrigo Gil	1
MPM	28	(Brazil) Vinícius Kwong	6

== Race calendar and results ==
The 2019 calendar was announced on December 20, 2018.

Round		Circuit	Date	Pole Position	Fastest Lap	Winner	Winner team
1	R1	(Brazil) Velopark, Nova Santa Rita	April 7	(Brazil) Pietro Rimbano	(Brazil) Gabriel Robe	(Brazil) Guilherme Salas	KTF Sports
1	R2	(Brazil) Velopark, Nova Santa Rita	April 8		(Brazil) Vitor Baptista	(Brazil) Vitor Baptista	SG Racing
2	R1	(Brazil) Autódromo Internacional Ayrton Senna, Goiânia	May 18	(Brazil) Raphael Reis	(Brazil) Gustavo Frigotto	(Brazil) Guilherme Salas	KTF Sports
2	R2	(Brazil) Autódromo Internacional Ayrton Senna, Goiânia	May 19		(Brazil) Raphael Reis	(Brazil) Guilherme Salas	KTF Sports
3	R1	(Brazil) Autódromo Internacional Ayrton Senna, Londrina	June 9	(Brazil) Guilherme Salas	(Brazil) Guilherme Salas	(Brazil) Guilherme Salas	KTF Sports
3	R2	(Brazil) Autódromo Internacional Ayrton Senna, Londrina	June 9		(Brazil) Gustavo Myasava	(Brazil) Matheus Iorio	Crown Racing Junior
4	R1	(Brazil) Autódromo Internacional de Santa Cruz do Sul, Santa Cruz do Sul	July 21				
4	R2	(Brazil) Autódromo Internacional de Santa Cruz do Sul, Santa Cruz do Sul	July 21				
5	R1	(Brazil) Autódromo Internacional Orlando Moura, Campo Grande	August 11				
5	R2	(Brazil) Autódromo Internacional Orlando Moura, Campo Grande	August 11				
6		(Brazil) 11ª Corrida do Milhão Pirelli 2019, Autódromo José Carlos Pace, São Paulo	August 25				
7	R1	(Brazil) Autódromo Internacional de Curitiba, Curitiba	September 15				
7	R2	(Brazil) Autódromo Internacional de Curitiba, Curitiba	September 15				
8	R1	(Brazil) Autódromo Internacional de Cascavel, Cascavel	October 20				
8	R2	(Brazil) Autódromo Internacional de Cascavel, Cascavel	October 20				
9	R1	(Brazil) Autódromo Internacional de Tarumã	November 10				
9	R2	(Brazil) Autódromo Internacional de Tarumã	November 10				
10	R1	(Brazil) Autódromo Internacional Ayrton Senna, Goiânia	November 25				
10	R2	(Brazil) Autódromo Internacional Ayrton Senna, Goiânia	November 25				
11		(Brazil) Grande Final, Autódromo José Carlos Pace, São Paulo	December 15				
