= Fábio Carbone =

Brazilian race car driver

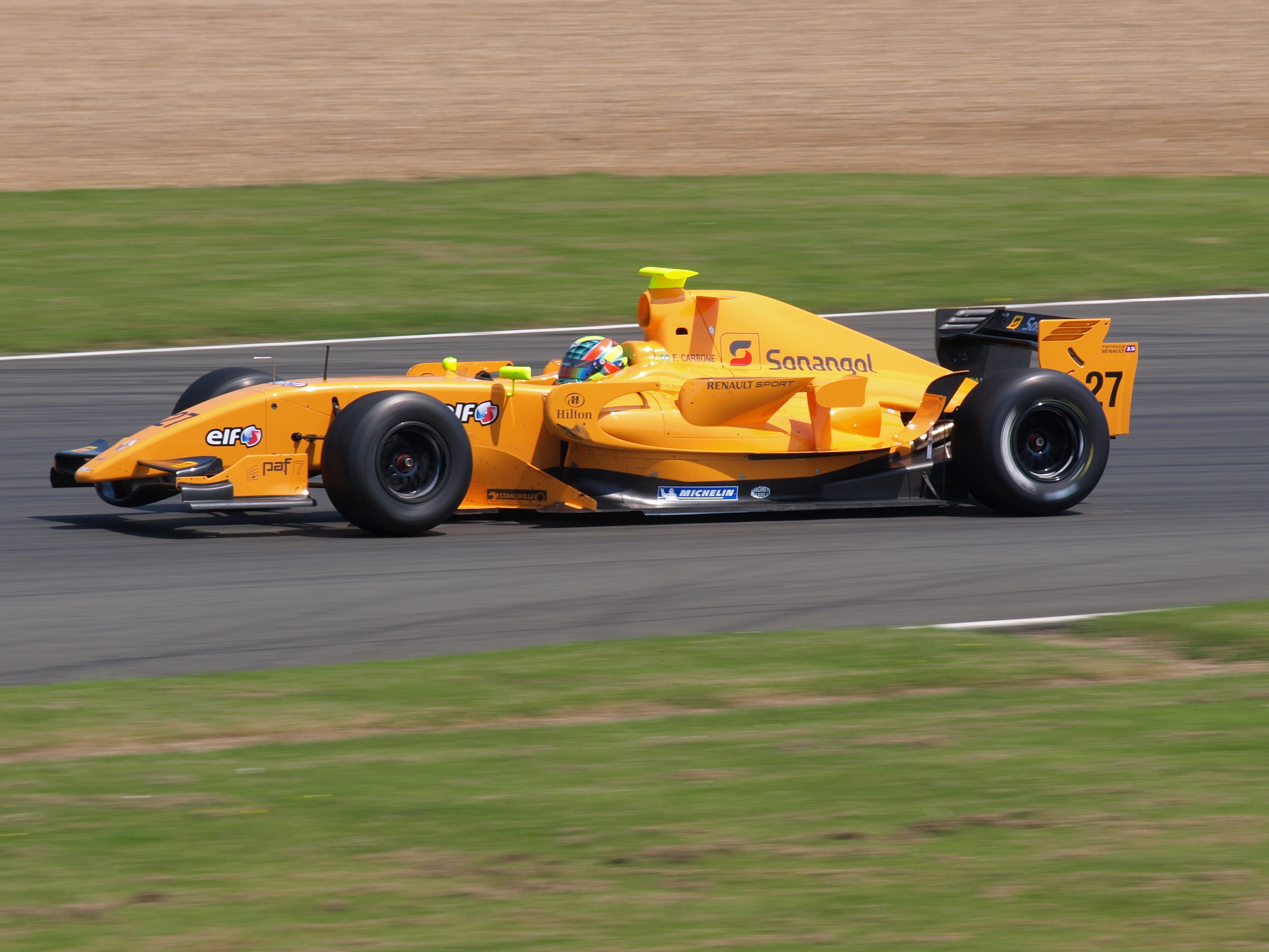
- Carbone driving for Ultimate Signature at the Silverstone round of the 2008 Formula Renault 3.5 season
- Nationality: (Brazil) Brazilian
- Born: September 4, 1980 (age 46) São Paulo, Brazil

Previous series
- 2005, 2008 2007 2006–08 2005–06 2004, 2006 2003, 2005 2002–03 2002 2001 2000–01 1998–2000: Formula Renault 3.5 Series; Formula Nippon; Super GT; A1 Grand Prix; All-Japan Formula 3 Formula 3 Euro Series; British Formula 3 German Formula 3 Formula Renault 2000 Eurocup; Formula Renault 2000 Italia; Formula Chevrolet Brazil

Fábio Carbone (born September 4, 1980) is a Brazilian former race car driver.

== Racing career ==
Carbone began his career in karting at the age of nine and won the Brazilian national championship at 15 years of age, in 1995.

In 1999, Carbone moved into Formula Chevrolet and finishing the Brazilian championship in vice, behind Felipe Massa. He finished the championship in third in the next year.

In 2001, Carbone moved to Europe to compete in the Italian and Formula Renault Championship. He won three races and finished the series in third at once. In the same year, he participated in five races of the European Formula Renault Championship and took a pole position. Renault saw his activity and selected him to a driver of Renault Development Program.

=== Formula Three ===
In 2002, Carbone competed in the British Formula 3 Championship and finished in sixth. In this year, he won the Masters F3 race.

In 2003, Carbone moved to Formula 3 Euro Series of just establishment and finished in fifth. He won the race 2 of the Pau Grand Prix. And he took pole position in the Macau Grand Prix F3 race and runner-up in the race.

In 2004, once more, Carbone moved to another Formula Three championship, the Japanese Championship in this time. And he returned to Euroseries in 2005 before re-returned to Japanese Championship in 2006.

=== Japan ===
Though he ran as practice driver for the A1 Team Brazil in the 2005–06 season, Carbone went on to take an active part in Japan and competed in the Formula Nippon and Super GT in 2007.

Carbone also participated in 1000km Suzuka in 2006 and finished in second.

=== Formula Renault 3.5 Series ===
Carbone competed in the Formula Renault 3.5 Series in 2008, driving for the Ultimate Signature team, with team-mates Claudio Cantelli and Esteban Guerrieri. He won two consecutive races in 2008.

=== Return to Brazil ===
Carbone resumed his sports career in 2011. He raced in the Brasileiro de Marcas as well as some races in Stock Car Brasil and Porsche GT3 Cup Brasil.

== Racing record ==
=== Career summary ===
Season	Series	Team	Races	Wins	Poles	F.Laps	Podiums	Points	Position
1997	Formula Chevrolet Brazil	Vaska Rodas	10	1	1	1	1	27	11th
1998	Formula Chevrolet Brazil	Mico's Racing	4	2	?	?	4	67	5th
1999	Formula Chevrolet Brazil	Full Time Racing	10	2	2	2	8	?	**2nd**
2000	Formula Chevrolet Brazil	?	12	1	1	1	6	86	5th
2000	Formula Renault 2.0 Italia	ADM International	1	0	0	0	0	0	NC
2001	Formula Renault 2000 Eurocup	ADM Junior Team	6	0	0	0	2	70	6th
2001	Formula Renault 2.0 Italia	ADM Junior Team	10	2	1	1	3	154	**3rd**
2002	British Formula Three Championship	Fortec Motorsport	25	0	0	0	4	137	6th
2002	Macau Grand Prix	Fortec Motorsport	1	0	0	0	0	0	NC
2002	Korea Super Prix	Fortec Motorsport	1	0	0	0	0	0	4th
2002	Masters of Formula 3	Fortec Motorsport	1	1	1	0	1	0	**1st**
2003	British Formula Three Championship	Hitech Grand Prix	2	0	0	0	0	1	25th
2003	Formula 3 Euro Series	Signature Plus	20	1	0	0	4	55	6th
2003	Macau Grand Prix	Signature Plus	1	0	1	0	1	0	**2nd**
2003	Korea Super Prix	Signature Plus	1	0	0	0	0	0	8th
2003	Masters of Formula 3	Signature Plus	1	0	0	0	0	0	10th
2004	Japanese Formula 3 Championship	ThreeBond Racing	20	1	0	3	3	127	8th
2004	Macau Grand Prix	ThreeBond Racing	1	0	0	0	0	0	4th
2004	Bahrain Super Prix	ThreeBond Racing	1	0	0	0	0	0	5th
2005	Formula 3 Euro Series	Signature	20	0	0	0	0	14	13th
2005	Macau Grand Prix	Signature	1	0	0	0	0	0	12th
2005	Formula Renault 3.5 Series	EuroInternational	4	0	0	0	0	7	22nd
2006	Japanese Formula 3 Championship	ThreeBond Racing	18	2	3	0	8	169	4th
2006	Macau Grand Prix	ThreeBond Racing	1	0	0	0	0	0	10th
2006	Super GT	Nismo	1	0	0	0	1	20	17th
2007	Formula Nippon	NTT DoCoMo Team Dandelion	9	0	0	0	0	3	15th
2007	Super GT	Nakajima Racing	9	1	0	0	3	69	**2nd**
2008	Formula Renault 3.5 Series	Ultimate Signature	17	3	1	2	6	97	**3rd**
2008	Super GT	Nismo	1	0	0	0	0	3	24th
2011	Brasileiro de Marcas	Full Time Sports	16	1	1	0	3	205	**3rd**
2012	Stock Car Brasil	Bassani Racing	1	0	0	0	0	0	NC
2012	Brasileiro de Marcas	Full Time Sports	14	1	1	0	2	56	17th
2014	Stock Car Brasil	Prati-Donaduzzi	1	0	0	0	0	0	NC
2014	Brasileiro de Marcas	C2 Team	1	0	0	0	0	0	32nd
2015	Stock Car Brasil	Axalta C2 Team	1	0	0	0	0	0	NC
2015	Brasileiro de Marcas	Full Time Sports	8	3	1	4	3	113	12th
2016	Stock Car Brasil	Mico's Racing	3	0	0	0	0	2	34th
2016	Brasileiro de Marcas	Greco Competicoes	11	1	1	2	1	58	15th
2018	Stock Car Brasil	Squadra G-Force	3	0	0	0	0	0	NC
2026	Porsche Carrera Cup Brasil								

=== Complete Formula 3 Euro Series results ===
(key) (Races in bold indicate pole position) (Races in italics indicate fastest lap)

Year	Entrant	Chassis	Engine	1	2	3	4	5	6	7	8	9	10	11	12	13	14	15	16	17	18	19	20	DC	Pts
2003	Signature Plus	Dallara F302/018	Sodemo	HOC; 1; 11	HOC; 2; 11	ADR; 1; 2	ADR; 2; 10	PAU; 1; 4	PAU; 2; 1	NOR; 1; 5	NOR; 2; 12	LMS; 1; 6	LMS; 2; 2	NÜR; 1; 6	NÜR; 2; 23	A1R; 1; 15	A1R; 2; 12	ZAN; 1; 21	ZAN; 2; 6	HOC; 1; 4	HOC; 2 Ret	MAG; 1; 3	MAG; 2 Ret	6th	55
2005	Signature Plus	SLC R1/001	Opel	HOC; 1; 14	HOC; 2; 12	PAU; 1; 16	PAU; 2; 5	SPA; 1; 4	SPA; 2 DSQ	MON; 1; 6	MON; 2; 12	OSC; 1; 9	OSC; 2; 12	NOR; 1; 7	NOR; 2; 18	NÜR; 1; 17	NÜR; 2; 13	ZAN; 1 Ret	ZAN; 2 Ret	LAU; 1; 20	LAU; 2; 11	HOC; 1 Ret	HOC; 2; 8	13th	15

=== Complete Formula Renault 3.5 Series results ===
(key) (Races in bold indicate pole position) (Races in italics indicate fastest lap)

Year	Entrant	1	2	3	4	5	6	7	8	9	10	11	12	13	14	15	16	17	DC	Points
2005	EuroInternational	ZOL; 1	ZOL; 2	MON; 1	VAL; 1	VAL; 2	LMS; 1	LMS; 2	BIL; 1	BIL; 2	OSC; 1	OSC; 2	DON; 1; 9	DON; 2; 8	EST; 1; 15	EST; 2; 9	MNZ; 1	MNZ; 2	22nd	7
2008	Ultimate Signature	MNZ; 1 DSQ	MNZ; 2 Ret	SPA; 1; 15	SPA; 2 Ret	MON; 1; 12	SIL; 1; 4	SIL; 2; 5	HUN; 1; 3	**HUN**; **2**; 1	NÜR; 1; 1	NÜR; 2; 6	BUG; 1; 3	BUG; 2; 2	EST; 1; 1	EST; 2 Ret	CAT; 1; 5	CAT; 2; 10	3rd	97

=== Complete Super GT results ===
Year	Team	Car	Class	1	2	3	4	5	6	7	8	9	DC	Pts
2006	NISMO	Nissan Z	GT500	SUZ	OKA	FUJ	SEP	SUG	SUZ; 2	MOT	AUT	FUJ	17th	20
2007	Nakajima Racing	Honda NSX	GT500	SUZ; 3	OKA; 4	FUJ; Ret	SEP; 15	SUG; 3	SUZ; 13	MOT; 4	AUT; 9	FUJ; 1	2nd	69
2008	NISMO	Nissan GT-R	GT500	SUZ	OKA	FUJ	SEP	SUG	SUZ; 8	MOT	AUT	FUJ	24th	3

Sporting positions
Preceded by Takuma Sato	Formula Three Masters; Winner; 2002	Succeeded by Christian Klien
