= 2019 GT Cup Open Europe =

The 2019 GT Cup Open Europe was the inaugural season of the GT Cup Open Europe, the grand tourer-style sports car racing series founded by the Spanish GT Sport Organización. It began on 27 April at Le Castellet and finished on 12 October, at Monza after six double-header meetings.

== Entry list ==
Team	Car	No.	Drivers	Class	Rounds
(Portugal) Sports and you	Mercedes AMG GT4	2	(Brazil) Marcio Basso	PA	1–4, 6
(Portugal) Sports and you	Mercedes AMG GT4	2	(Brazil) Guilherme Salas	PA	1, 3–4
(Portugal) Sports and you	Mercedes AMG GT4	2	(Portugal) Lourenço Da Veiga	PA	2
(Portugal) Sports and you	Mercedes AMG GT4	2	(Portugal) José Pedro Fontes (Note: Drivers who started their first race of the season at the final round are ineligible for points and invisible as far as awarding points to other drivers".)	PA	6
(Belgium) EMG Motorsport	Porsche 991 GT3 Cup	3	(Belgium) Nicolas Vandierendonck	Am	1
(Belgium) EMG Motorsport	Porsche 991 GT3 Cup	3	(Belgium) Filip Teunkens	Am	1
(Belgium) EMG Motorsport	Porsche 991 GT3 Cup	3	(Belgium) Nicolas Vandierendonck	PA	2, 4–5
(Belgium) EMG Motorsport	Porsche 991 GT3 Cup	3	(Netherlands) Bas Schouten	PA	2, 4–5
(Belgium) EMG Motorsport	Porsche 991 GT3 Cup	37	(Belgium) John De Wilde	Am	1–2, 4–5
Scuderia San Marino	Montecarlo/Tecno Alfa Romeo "Nanni Galli"	4	(Monaco) Fulvio Maria Ballabio	PA	6
Scuderia San Marino	Montecarlo/Tecno Alfa Romeo "Nanni Galli"	4	(Switzerland) David Fumarelli	PA	6
(Italy) Vincenzo Sospiri Racing	Lamborghini Huracan Super Trofeo Evo	6	(Switzerland) Hans-Peter Koller	PA	All
(Italy) Vincenzo Sospiri Racing	Lamborghini Huracan Super Trofeo Evo	6	(Italy) Edoardo Liberati	PA	All
(Italy) Vincenzo Sospiri Racing	Lamborghini Huracan Super Trofeo Evo	27	(Brazil) JP Mauro	Am	All
(Italy) Vincenzo Sospiri Racing	Lamborghini Huracan Super Trofeo Evo	27	(Brazil) Rodolfo Toni	Am	All
(Spain) Teo Martín Motorsport	McLaren 570S GT4	7	(Spain) Marc De Fulgencio	S	1–2
(Spain) Teo Martín Motorsport	McLaren 570S GT4	7	(Brazil) Thiago Vivacqua	S	1–2
(Spain) Teo Martín Motorsport	McLaren 570S GT4	7	(Spain) Marc De Fulgencio	PA	3–6
(Spain) Teo Martín Motorsport	McLaren 570S GT4	7	(Brazil) Thiago Vivacqua	PA	3–6
(Spain) Teo Martín Motorsport	McLaren 570S GT4	18	(Spain) Guillem Pujeu	S	1–2
(Spain) Teo Martín Motorsport	McLaren 570S GT4	18	(Spain) Faust Salom	S	1–2
(Spain) Teo Martín Motorsport	McLaren 570S GT4	18	(Spain) Guillem Pujeu	PA	3–6
(Spain) Teo Martín Motorsport	McLaren 570S GT4	18	(Spain) Faust Salom	PA	3–6
(Spain) Baporo Motorsport	Audi R8 LMS GT4	10	(Andorra) Manel Cerqueda	Am	All
(Spain) Baporo Motorsport	Audi R8 LMS GT4	10	(Spain) Daniel Díaz-Varela	Am	All
(Spain) Baporo Motorsport	Porsche 991 GT3 Cup	13	(Spain) Jaume Font	Am	All
(Spain) Baporo Motorsport	Porsche 991 GT3 Cup	13	(Andorra) Joan Vinyes	Am	1, 3–5
(Italy) Duell Race	Porsche 991 GT3 Cup	11	(Italy) Eugenio Pisani	S	1
(Italy) Duell Race	Porsche 991 GT3 Cup	11	(Italy) Michele Merendino	S	1
(Italy) Duell Race	Porsche 991 GT3 Cup	11	(Italy) Eugenio Pisani	PA	2
(Italy) Duell Race	Porsche 991 GT3 Cup	11	(Italy) Mark Speakerwas	PA	2
(Italy) Duell Race	Porsche 991 GT3 Cup	15	(Spain) Fernando Navarrete	PA	1
(Italy) Duell Race	Porsche 991 GT3 Cup	15	(Spain) Fernando Navarrete Jr.	PA	1
(Italy) Duell Race	Porsche 991 GT3 Cup	19	(Italy) Stefano Bozzoni	PA	2, 5–6
(Italy) Duell Race	Porsche 991 GT3 Cup	19	(Spain) Fernando Navarrete	PA	2
(Italy) Duell Race	Porsche 991 GT3 Cup	19	(Italy) Eugenio Pisani	PA	5–6
(Italy) Antonelli MotorSport	Lamborghini Huracan Super Trofeo Evo	12	(Italy) Glauco Solieri	Am	All
(Switzerland) PZ Oberer Zurichsee	Porsche 991 Cup	22	(Switzerland) Niki Leutwiler	Am	All
(Belgium) Selleslagh Racing Team	Mercedes AMG GT4	31	(Italy) Lorenzo Bontempelli	Am	6
(Belgium) Selleslagh Racing Team	Mercedes AMG GT4	31	(Italy) Luciano Linossi	Am	6
(Spain) Three Sixty Racing Team	Mercedes AMG GT4	32	(Brazil) Fernando Fortes	Am	All
(Spain) Three Sixty Racing Team	Mercedes AMG GT4	32	(Brazil) Julio Martini	Am	1–2
(Spain) Three Sixty Racing Team	Mercedes AMG GT4	32	(Brazil) Guilherme Reischl	Am	3–4, 6
(France) Martinet By Almeras	Porsche 991 GT3 Cup	34	(France) Cédric Mezard	PA	1
(France) Martinet By Almeras	Porsche 991 GT3 Cup	34	(France) Steeve Hiesse	PA	1
(France) Martinet By Almeras	Porsche 991 GT3 Cup	71	(France) Pierre Martinet	Am	1–5
(France) Martinet By Almeras	Porsche 991 GT3 Cup	71	(France) Gérard Tremblay	Am	1–4
(France) Martinet By Almeras	Porsche 991 GT3 Cup	71	(France) Christian Blugeon	Am	5
(France) Martinet By Almeras	Porsche 991 GT3 Cup	74	(France) Victor Blugeon	PA	3
(United Kingdom) Optimum Motorsport	Aston Martin Vantage AMR GT4	35	(Republic of Ireland) Connor O'Brien	PA	4
(United Kingdom) Optimum Motorsport	Aston Martin Vantage AMR GT4	35	(Republic of Ireland) Charlie Eastwood	PA	4
(United Kingdom) Whitebridge Motorsport	Aston Martin Vantage AMR GT4	72	(United Kingdom) Christopher Murphy	Am	4
(United Kingdom) Whitebridge Motorsport	Aston Martin Vantage AMR GT4	72	(United Kingdom) Adam Hatfield	Am	4
(Ukraine) Tsunami RT	Porsche 991 GT3 Cup	81	(Italy) Lino Curti	PA	All
(Ukraine) Tsunami RT	Porsche 991 GT3 Cup	81	(Italy) Carlo Curti	PA	All
(Poland) Team Virage	Aston Martin Vantage AMR GT4	95	(Spain) Fernando Navarrete	PA	5
(Poland) Team Virage	Aston Martin Vantage AMR GT4	95	(Spain) Alvaro Lobera	PA	5
(Spain) Mirage Racing	Alpine A110 Cup	919	(France) Philippe Bourgois	Am	2
(Spain) Mirage Racing	Alpine A110 Cup	919	(France) Philippe Haezebrouck	Am	2

== Race calendar and results ==
- A six-round calendar was revealed on 2 January 2019. The schedule consisted of 6 circuits for the first year of the series with all the rounds supporting the International GT Open.

Round		Circuit	Date	Pole position	Pro-Am Winner	Am Winner	Silver Winner
1	R1	(France) Circuit Paul Ricard, Le Castellet	27 April	(Italy) No. 6 Vincenzo Sospiri Racing	(Italy) No. 6 Vincenzo Sospiri Racing	(Italy) No. 27 Vincenzo Sospiri Racing	(Spain) No. 7 Teo Martín Motorsport
1	R1	(France) Circuit Paul Ricard, Le Castellet	27 April	(Switzerland) Hans-Peter Koller (Italy) Edoardo Liberati	(Switzerland) Hans-Peter Koller	(Brazil) JP Mauro (Brazil) Rodolfo Toni	(Spain) Marc De Fulgencio (Brazil) Thiago Vivacqua
1	R2	(France) Circuit Paul Ricard, Le Castellet	28 April	(Italy) No. 6 Vincenzo Sospiri Racing	(Portugal) No. 2 Sports and you	(Italy) No. 12 Antonelli MotorSport	(Italy) No. 11 Duell Race
1	R2	(France) Circuit Paul Ricard, Le Castellet	28 April	(Switzerland) Hans-Peter Koller (Italy) Edoardo Liberati	(Brazil) Marcio Basso (Brazil) Guilherme Salas	(Italy) Glauco Solieri	(Italy) Eugenio Pisani (Italy) Michele Merendino
2	R1	(Belgium) Circuit de Spa-Francorchamps	8 June	(Belgium) No. 3 EMG Motorsport	(Belgium) No. 3 EMG Motorsport	(Switzerland) No. 22 PZ Oberer Zurichsee	(Spain) No. 7 Teo Martín Motorsport
2	R1	(Belgium) Circuit de Spa-Francorchamps	8 June	(Belgium) Nicolas Vandierendonck (Netherlands) Bas Schouten	(Belgium) Nicolas Vandierendonck (Netherlands) Bas Schouten	(Switzerland) Niki Leutwiler	(Spain) Marc De Fulgencio (Brazil) Thiago Vivacqua
2	R2	(Belgium) Circuit de Spa-Francorchamps	9 June	(Switzerland) No. 22 PZ Oberer Zurichsee	(Belgium) No. 3 EMG Motorsport	(Italy) No. 12 Antonelli MotorSport	None
2	R2	(Belgium) Circuit de Spa-Francorchamps	9 June	(Switzerland) Niki Leutwiler	(Belgium) Nicolas Vandierendonck (Netherlands) Bas Schouten	(Italy) Glauco Solieri	None
3	R1	(Hungary) Hungaroring	6 July	(Italy) No. 6 Vincenzo Sospiri Racing	(Italy) No. 6 Vincenzo Sospiri Racing	(Italy) No. 12 Antonelli MotorSport	None
3	R1	(Hungary) Hungaroring	6 July	(Switzerland) Hans-Peter Koller (Italy) Edoardo Liberati	(Switzerland) Hans-Peter Koller (Italy) Edoardo Liberati	(Italy) Glauco Solieri	None
3	R2	(Hungary) Hungaroring	7 July	(Portugal) No. 2 Sports and you	(Portugal) No. 2 Sports and you	(Italy) No. 12 Antonelli MotorSport	None
3	R2	(Hungary) Hungaroring	7 July	(Brazil) Marcio Basso (Brazil) Guilherme Salas	(Brazil) Marcio Basso (Brazil) Guilherme Salas	(Italy) Glauco Solieri	None
4	R1	(United Kingdom) Silverstone Circuit	7 September	(Italy) No. 27 Vincenzo Sospiri Racing	(Italy) No. 6 Vincenzo Sospiri Racing	(Spain) No. 10 Baporo Motorsport	None
4	R1	(United Kingdom) Silverstone Circuit	7 September	(Brazil) JP Mauro (Brazil) Rodolfo Toni	(Switzerland) Hans-Peter Koller (Italy) Edoardo Liberati	(Andorra) Manel Cerqueda (Spain) Daniel Díaz-Varela	None
4	R2	(United Kingdom) Silverstone Circuit	8 September	(Italy) No. 6 Vincenzo Sospiri Racing	(Italy) No. 6 Vincenzo Sospiri Racing	(Switzerland) No. 22 PZ Oberer Zurichsee	None
4	R2	(United Kingdom) Silverstone Circuit	8 September	(Switzerland) Hans-Peter Koller (Italy) Edoardo Liberati	(Switzerland) Hans-Peter Koller (Italy) Edoardo Liberati	(Switzerland) Niki Leutwiler	None
5	R1	(Spain) Circuit de Barcelona-Catalunya	21 September	(Switzerland) No. 22 PZ Oberer Zurichsee	(Italy) No. 6 Vincenzo Sospiri Racing	(Spain) No. 13 Baporo Motorsport	None
5	R1	(Spain) Circuit de Barcelona-Catalunya	21 September	(Switzerland) Niki Leutwiler	(Switzerland) Hans-Peter Koller (Italy) Edoardo Liberati	(Spain) Jaume Font (Andorra) Joan Vinyes	None
5	R2	(Spain) Circuit de Barcelona-Catalunya	22 September	(Italy) No. 6 Vincenzo Sospiri Racing	(Italy) No. 6 Vincenzo Sospiri Racing	(Switzerland) No. 22 PZ Oberer Zurichsee	None
5	R2	(Spain) Circuit de Barcelona-Catalunya	22 September	(Switzerland) Hans-Peter Koller (Italy) Edoardo Liberati	(Switzerland) Hans-Peter Koller (Italy) Edoardo Liberati	(Switzerland) Niki Leutwiler	None
6	R1	(Italy) Autodromo Nazionale Monza	12 October	(Switzerland) No. 22 PZ Oberer Zurichsee	(Spain) No. 7 Teo Martín Motorsport	(Italy) No. 27 Vincenzo Sospiri Racing	None
6	R1	(Italy) Autodromo Nazionale Monza	12 October	(Switzerland) Niki Leutwiler	(Spain) Marc De Fulgencio (Brazil) Thiago Vivacqua	(Brazil) JP Mauro (Brazil) Rodolfo Toni	None
6	R2	(Italy) Autodromo Nazionale Monza	13 October	(Italy) No. 6 Vincenzo Sospiri Racing	(Italy) No. 81 Tsunami RT	(Italy) No. 27 Vincenzo Sospiri Racing	None
6	R2	(Italy) Autodromo Nazionale Monza	13 October	(Switzerland) Hans-Peter Koller (Italy) Edoardo Liberati	(Italy) Lino Curti (Italy) Carlo Curti	(Brazil) JP Mauro (Brazil) Rodolfo Toni	None

== Championship standings ==
=== Points systems ===
Points are awarded to the top 10 (Overall) or top 6 (Am, Pro-Am, Teams) classified finishers. If less than 6 participants start the race or if less than 75% of the original race distance is completed, half points are awarded. At the end of the season, the lowest race score is dropped; however, the dropped race cannot be the result of a disqualification or race ban.

==== Overall ====
Position	1st	2nd	3rd	4th	5th	6th	7th	8th	9th	10th
Points	15	12	10	8	6	5	4	3	2	1

==== Silver, Pro-Am, Am, and Teams ====
Position	1st	2nd	3rd	4th	5th	6th
Points	10	8	6	4	3	2

=== Drivers' championships ===
==== Overall ====
Pos.	Driver	Team	LEC (France)		SPA (Belgium)		HUN (Hungary)		SIL (United Kingdom)		CAT (Spain)		MNZ (Italy)		Points
1	(Switzerland) Hans-Peter Koller	(Italy) Vincenzo Sospiri Racing	1	Ret			1	2	1	1	1	1	Ret	12	102
2	(Switzerland) Niki Leutwiler	(Switzerland) PZ Oberer Zurichsee	3	5	1	3	4	6	5	2	6	2	3	11	100
3	(Italy) Edoardo Liberati	(Italy) Vincenzo Sospiri Racing	DNS	Ret			1	2	1	1	1	1	Ret	12	87
4	(Brazil) JP Mauro (Brazil) Rodolfo Toni	(Italy) Vincenzo Sospiri Racing	2	2	6	5	10	5	4	7	Ret	DNS	1	3	79
5	(Italy) Glauco Solieri	(Italy) Antonelli MotorSport	13	1	16	1	3	4	6	3	4	8	Ret	Ret	74
6	(Andorra) Manel Cerqueda	(Spain) Baporo Motorsport	8	11	9	10	8	10	3	4	3	3	5	5	60
7	(Spain) Daniel Díaz-Varela	(Spain) Baporo Motorsport	8	11	DNS	10	8	10	3	4	3	3	5	5	58
8	(Belgium) John De Wilde	(Belgium) EMG Motorsport	6	4	2	2			10	6	5	5			55
9	(Spain) Jaume Font	(Spain) Baporo Motorsport	7	Ret	4	8	12	8	11	8	2	6	2	9	52
10	(Spain) Marc De Fulgencio (Brazil) Thiago Vivacqua	(Spain) Teo Martín Motorsport	5	9	5	7	9	11	8	12	7	10	4	2	48
11	(Brazil) Marcio Basso	(Portugal) Sports and you	4	3	11	12	5	1	7	13			Ret	7	47
12	(Italy) Lino Curti (Italy) Carlo Curti	(Italy) Tsunami RT	10	6	8	6	6	7	9	10	11	7	Ret	1	45
13	(Brazil) Guilherme Salas	(Portugal) Sports and you	4	3			5	1	7	13					43
14	(Spain) Guillem Pujeu (Spain) Faust Salom	(Spain) Teo Martín Motorsport	9	8	7	11	7	9	Ret	11	8	11	7	4	31
15	(Belgium) Nicolas Vandierendonck	(Belgium) EMG Motorsport	11	12	3	4			12	9	Ret	4			28
15	(Netherlands) Bas Schouten	(Belgium) EMG Motorsport			3	4			12	9	Ret	4			28
16	(Andorra) Joan Vinyes	(Spain) Baporo Motorsport	7	Ret			12	8	11	8	2	6			27
17	(France) Victor Blugeon	(France) Martinet By Almeras					2	3							22
18	(Republic of Ireland) Connor O'Brien (Republic of Ireland) Charlie Eastwood	(United Kingdom) Optimum Motorsport							2	5					18
19	(Italy) Eugenio Pisani	(Italy) Duell Race	Ret	7	10	9					12	12	9	6	15
20	(Brazil) Fernando Fortes	(Spain) Three Sixty Racing Team	12	13	15	14	11	12	13	14	10	9	8	8	10
21	(Italy) Stefano Bozzoni	(Italy) Duell Race			13	13					12	12	9	6	8
22	(Brazil) Guilherme Reischl	(Spain) Three Sixty Racing Team					11	12	13	14			8	8	7
23	(Italy) Michele Merendino	(Italy) Duell Race	Ret	7											4
24	(Italy) Mark Speakerwas	(Italy) Duell Race			10	9									3
25	(Spain) Fernando Navarrete	(Italy) Duell Race	Ret	DNS	13	13									2
25	(Spain) Fernando Navarrete	(Poland) Team Virage									9	Ret			2
25	(Spain) Alvaro Lobera	(Poland) Team Virage									9	Ret			2
26	(France) Cédric Mezard (France) Steeve Hiesse	(France) Martinet By Almeras	Ret	10											1
27	(Portugal) Lourenço Da Veiga	(Portugal) Sports and you			11	12									0
28	(Belgium) Filip Teunkens	(Belgium) EMG Motorsport	11	12											0
29	(Spain) Fernando Navarrete Jr.	(Italy) Duell Race	Ret	DNS											0
30	(Brazil) Julio Martini	(Spain) Three Sixty Racing Team	12	13	15	14									0
31	(France) Gérard Tremblay	(France) Martinet By Almeras	14	14	14	16	13	13	15	15					0
31	(France) Christian Blugeon	(France) Martinet By Almeras									13	13			0
31	(France) Pierre Martinet	(France) Martinet By Almeras	14	14	14	16	13	13	15	15	13	13			0
32	(United Kingdom) Christopher Murphy (United Kingdom) Adam Hatfield	(United Kingdom) Whitebridge Motorsport							14	DNS					0
33	(France) Philippe Bourgois (France) Philippe Haezebrouck	(France) Mirage Racing			12	15									0
Entries ineligible to score points
	(Italy) Lorenzo Bontempelli (Italy) Luciano Linossi	(Belgium) Selleslagh Racing Team											6	10	
	(Portugal) José Pedro Fontes	(Portugal) Sports and you											Ret	7	
	(Monaco) Fulvio Maria Ballabio (Switzerland) David Fumarelli	Scuderia San Marino											Ret	Ret	
Pos.	Driver	Team	LEC (France)		SPA (Belgium)		HUN (Hungary)		SIL (United Kingdom)		CAT (Spain)		MNZ (Italy)		Points

==== Silver ====
Pos.	Driver	Team	LEC (France)		SPA (Belgium)		HUN (Hungary)	SIL (United Kingdom)	CAT (Spain)	MNZ (Italy)	Points
1	(Spain) Marc De Fulgencio (Brazil) Thiago Vivacqua	(Spain) Teo Martín Motorsport	5	9	5	DNS					13
2	(Spain) Guillem Pujeu (Spain) Faust Salom	(Spain) Teo Martín Motorsport	9	8	7	DNS					12
3	(Italy) Eugenio Pisani (Italy) Michele Merendino	(Italy) Duell Race	Ret	7							5
Pos.	Driver	Team	LEC (France)		SPA (Belgium)		HUN (Hungary)	SIL (United Kingdom)	CAT (Spain)	MNZ (Italy)	Points

==== Pro-Am ====
Pos.	Driver	Team	LEC (France)		SPA (Belgium)		HUN (Hungary)		SIL (United Kingdom)		CAT (Spain)		MNZ (Italy)		Points
1	(Switzerland) Hans-Peter Koller	(Italy) Vincenzo Sospiri Racing	1	Ret			1	2	1	1	1	1	Ret	12	65
2	(Italy) Edoardo Liberati	(Italy) Vincenzo Sospiri Racing	DNS	Ret			1	2	1	1	1	1	Ret	12	60
3	(Italy) Lino Curti (Italy) Carlo Curti	(Italy) Tsunami RT	10	6	8	6	6	7	9	10	11	7	Ret	1	53
4	(Spain) Marc De Fulgencio (Brazil) Thiago Vivacqua	(Spain) Teo Martín Motorsport				7	9	11	8	12	7	10	4	2	46
5	(Brazil) Marcio Basso	(Portugal) Sports and you	4	3	11	12	5	1	7	13			Ret	7	38
6	(Spain) Guillem Pujeu (Spain) Faust Salom	(Spain) Teo Martín Motorsport				11	7	9	Ret	11	8	11	7	4	35
7	(Belgium) Nicolas Vandierendonck (Netherlands) Bas Schouten	(Belgium) EMG Motorsport			3	4			12	9	Ret	4			31
8	(Brazil) Guilherme Salas	(Portugal) Sports and you	4	3			5	1	7	13					31
9	(Italy) Eugenio Pisani	(Italy) Duell Race			10	9					12	12	9	6	21
10	(Republic of Ireland) Connor O'Brien (Republic of Ireland) Charlie Eastwood	(United Kingdom) Optimum Motorsport							2	5					16
11	(Italy) Stefano Bozzoni	(Italy) Duell Race			13	13					12	12	9	6	15
12	(France) Victor Blugeon	(France) Martinet By Almeras					2	3							14
13	(Italy) Mark Speakerwas	(Italy) Duell Race			10	9									7
14	(Spain) Fernando Navarrete	(Italy) Duell Race	Ret	DNS	13	13									5
14	(Spain) Fernando Navarrete	(Poland) Team Virage									9	Ret			5
15	(Spain) Alvaro Lobera	(Poland) Team Virage									9	Ret			4
16	(Portugal) Lourenço Da Veiga	(Portugal) Sports and you			11	12									4
17	(France) Cédric Mezard (France) Steeve Hiesse	(France) Martinet By Almeras	Ret	10											3
18	(Spain) Fernando Navarrete Jr.	(Italy) Duell Race	Ret	DNS											0
Entries ineligible to score points
	(Portugal) José Pedro Fontes	(Portugal) Sports and you											Ret	7	
	(Monaco) Fulvio Maria Ballabio (Switzerland) David Fumarelli	Scuderia San Marino											Ret	Ret	
Pos.	Driver	Team	LEC (France)		SPA (Belgium)		HUN (Hungary)		SIL (United Kingdom)		CAT (Spain)		MNZ (Italy)		Points

==== Am ====
Pos.	Driver	Team	LEC (France)		SPA (Belgium)		HUN (Hungary)		SIL (United Kingdom)		CAT (Spain)		MNZ (Italy)		Points
1	(Switzerland) Niki Leutwiler	(Switzerland) PZ Oberer Zurichsee	3	5	1	3	4	6	5	2	6	2	3	11	80
2	(Brazil) JP Mauro (Brazil) Rodolfo Toni	(Italy) Vincenzo Sospiri Racing	2	2	6	5	10	5	4	7	Ret	DNS	1	3	69
3	(Andorra) Manel Cerqueda	(Spain) Baporo Motorsport	8	11	9	10	8	10	3	4	3	3	5	5	64
4	(Italy) Glauco Solieri	(Italy) Antonelli MotorSport	13	1	16	1	3	4	6	3	4	8	Ret	Ret	61
5	(Spain) Daniel Díaz-Varela	(Spain) Baporo Motorsport	8	11	DNS	10	8	10	3	4	3	3	5	5	61
6	(Spain) Jaume Font	(Spain) Baporo Motorsport	7	Ret	4	8	12	8	11	8	2	6	2	9	49
7	(Belgium) John De Wilde	(Belgium) EMG Motorsport	6	4	2	2			10	6	5	5			45
8	(Andorra) Joan Vinyes	(Spain) Baporo Motorsport	7	Ret			12	8	11	8	2	6			28
9	(Brazil) Fernando Fortes	(Spain) Three Sixty Racing Team	12	13	15	14	11	12	13	14	10	9	8	8	18
10	(Brazil) Guilherme Reischl	(Spain) Three Sixty Racing Team					11	12	13	14			8	8	14
11	(Belgium) Nicolas Vandierendonck (Belgium) Filip Teunkens	(Belgium) EMG Motorsport	11	12											4
12	(France) Philippe Bourgois (France) Philippe Haezebrouck	(France) Mirage Racing			12	15									2
13	(Brazil) Julio Martini	(Spain) Three Sixty Racing Team	12	13	15	14									0
14	(France) Gérard Tremblay	(France) Martinet By Almeras	14	14	14	16	13	13	15	15					0
14	(France) Christian Blugeon	(France) Martinet By Almeras									13	13			0
14	(France) Pierre Martinet	(France) Martinet By Almeras	14	14	14	16	13	13	15	15	13	13			0
15	(United Kingdom) Christopher Murphy (United Kingdom) Adam Hatfield	(United Kingdom) Whitebridge Motorsport							14	DNS					0
Entries ineligible to score points
	(Italy) Lorenzo Bontempelli (Italy) Luciano Linossi	(Belgium) Selleslagh Racing Team											6	10	
Pos.	Driver	Team	LEC (France)		SPA (Belgium)		HUN (Hungary)		SIL (United Kingdom)		CAT (Spain)		MNZ (Italy)		Points

=== Teams' Championship ===
Only the highest two finishing cars from a team count towards the Teams' Championship

Pos.	Team	Manufacturer	No.	Points
1	(Italy) Vincenzo Sospiri Racing	Lamborghini	6	112
1	(Italy) Vincenzo Sospiri Racing	Lamborghini	27	112
2	(Switzerland) PZ Oberer Zurichsee	Porsche	22	58
3	(Spain) Baporo Motorsport	Audi/Porsche	10	50
3	(Spain) Baporo Motorsport	Audi/Porsche	13	50
4	(Belgium) EMG Motorsport	Porsche	3	44
4	(Belgium) EMG Motorsport	Porsche	37	44
5	(Italy) Antonelli MotorSport	Lamborghini	12	42
6	(Spain) Teo Martín Motorsport	McLaren	7	24
6	(Spain) Teo Martín Motorsport	McLaren	18	24
7	(Portugal) Sports and you	Mercedes-AMG	2	23
8	(Italy) Tsunami RT	Porsche	81	16
9	(France) Martinet By Almeras	Porsche	34	14
9	(France) Martinet By Almeras	Porsche	71	14
9	(France) Martinet By Almeras	Porsche	74	14
10	(United Kingdom) Optimum Motorsport	Aston Martin	35	11
11	(Italy) Duell Race	Porsche	11	2
11	(Italy) Duell Race	Porsche	18	2
11	(Italy) Duell Race	Porsche	19	2
12	(Spain) Three Sixty Racing Team	Mercedes-AMG	32	0
13	(United Kingdom) Whitebridge Motorsport	Aston Martin	72	0
14	(France) Mirage Racing	Alpine	919	0
15	(Poland) Team Virage	Aston Martin	95	0
Entries ineligible to score points
	(Belgium) Selleslagh Racing Team	Mercedes-AMG	31	
	Scuderia San Marino	Tecno	4	
Pos.	Team	Manufacturer	No.	Points
