= Império Endurance Brasil =

South American auto racing series

- Category: Sports car racing
- Country: Brazil
- Region: South America
- Inaugural season: 2017
- Classes: P1, GT3 and GT4
- Tire suppliers: Pirelli
- Official website: Império Endurance Brasil

The Endurance Brasil (known as Império Endurance Brasil for sponsorship reasons) is a Sports car racing series based in Brazil organized by the Associacao de Pilotos de Endurance (APE). From 2001 until 2016 the series was organizaed by Brazilian Automobile Confederation (CBA) under the Brazilian Endurance Championship name when it was folded due to a lack of entrants.

== Champions ==
The following drivers have previously won the Império Endurance Brasil in their respective classes. An overall championship for all classes combined is awarded and those champions are marked with italics.

Year	Class	Champion	Car
2017	GP1	(Brazil) Ricardo Mauricio (Brazil) Marcel Visconde	Porsche 911 GT3
2017	P2	(Brazil) Fernando Ohashi (Brazil) Henrique Assunção	Tubarão IX
2017	P3	(Brazil) Julio Carlos Martini (Brazil) Marcelo Vianna	Metalmoro MRX
2017	GT1	(Brazil) Gustavo Martins (Brazil) Paulo Rutzen (Brazil) Vilson Júnior	Lamborghini Gallardo GT3
2017	GT2	(Brazil) Arthur Caleffi	Chevrolet Vectra
2017	T	(Brazil) Juarez Terres (Brazil) Ricardo Terres	Volkswagen Gol
2018	P1	(Brazil) Emilio Padrón	Metalmoro JLM AJR
2018	P2	(Brazil) Mauro Kern Jr (Brazil) Paulo Sousa	Tubarão IX
2018	P3	(Brazil) Gustavo Simon (Brazil) Rafael Simon	Metalmoro MRX
2018	GT3	(Brazil) Chico Longo	Ferrari 488 GT3
2018	GT4	(Brazil) Henry Visconde	Audi RS3 LMS TCR
2019	P1	(Brazil) Beto Ribeiro (Brazil) Nilson Ribeiro	Metalmoro JLM AJR
2019	P2	(Brazil) Mauro Kern Jr (Brazil) Paulo Sousa	Tubarão IX
2019	P3	(Brazil) Carlos Antunes (Brazil) Yuri Antunes	Metalmoro MRX
2019	P4	(Brazil) Ricardo Haag (Brazil) Mario Marcondes	Spyder Race
2019	GT3	(Brazil) Xandinho Negrão (Brazil) Xandy Negrão	Mercedes-AMG GT3
2019	GT3L	(Brazil) Guilherme Ribas (Brazil) Sergio Ribas	Aston Martin Vantage GT3
2019	GT4	(Brazil) Renan Guerra (Brazil) Renato Braga	Ginetta G55 GT4
2019	GT4L	(Brazil) Marcelo Karam (Brazil) Junior Victorette	Audi RS3 LMS TCR
2020	P1	(Brazil) Henrique Assunção (Brazil) Anderson Toso	Metalmoro JLM AJR
2020	P2	(Brazil) Ruben Ghisleni (Brazil) Lucas Kohl (Brazil) Hardy Kohl Jr	Protótipo MCR 2.1
2020	P3	(Brazil) Aldoir Sette	Metalmoro MRX
2020	GT3	(Brazil) Xandinho Negrão	Mercedes-AMG GT3
2020	GT3L	(Brazil) Guilherme Ribas (Brazil) Sergio Ribas	Aston Martin Vantage GT3
2020	GT4	(Brazil) Atila Abreu (Brazil) Leonardo Sanchez	Mercedes-AMG GT4
2020	GT4L	(Brazil) Tuca Antoniazzi	Mercedes-Benz CLA
2021	P1	(Brazil) Emilio Padrón (Brazil) Marcelo Vianna	Metalmoro JLM AJR
2021	P2	(Brazil) Fernando Poeta (Brazil) Claudio Ricci	MCR Grand-Am
2021	P3	(Brazil) Tiel de Andrade (Brazil) João Pedro Maia	Tubarão IX
2021	GT3	(Brazil) Cacá Bueno (Brazil) Ricardo Baptista	Mercedes-AMG GT3 Evo
2021	GT3L	(Brazil) Ricardo Mendes	Ferrari F430 GT3
2021	GT4	(Brazil) Cassio Homem de Mello (Brazil) André Moraes Jr.	Ford Mustang GT4
2021	GT4L	(Brazil) Francisco Horta (Brazil) Nelson Monteiro	Ginetta G55 GT4
2022	P1	(Brazil) Vicente Orige (Brazil) Gustavo Kiryla	Metalmoro JLM AJR
2022	P2	(Brazil) Fernando Poeta (Brazil) Claudio Ricci	MCR Grand-Am
2022	P2L	(Brazil) Ricardo Haag (Brazil) Mario Marcondes	Metalmoro MRX
2022	GT3	(Brazil) Marcos Gomes (Brazil) Xandinho Negrão	Mercedes-AMG GT3 Evo
2022	GT4	(Brazil) Renan Guerra (Brazil) Marco Pisani (Brazil) Leandro Ferrari	Mercedes-AMG GT4
2023	P1	(Brazil) Gaetano di Mauro	Ligier JS P320
2023	GT3	(Brazil) Ricardo Mauricio (Brazil) Marcel Viscone (Brazil) Marçal Muller	Porsche 911 GT3
2023	GT4	(Brazil) Danilo Dirani (Brazil) Jacques Quartiero	Porsche 718 Cayman GT4 RS Clubsport
2024	P1	(Brazil) Marcos Gomes; Xandinho Negrão	Ligier JS P320
2024	GT3	(Brazil) Ricardo Baptista (Brazil) Rafael Suzuki	Mercedes-AMG GT3 Evo
2024	GT4	(Brazil) Alan Hellmeister (Brazil) Jacques Quartiero	Porsche 718 Cayman GT4 RS Clubsport

#	Manufacturer
13	(Brazil) Metalmoro (Note: Metalmoro JLM AJR, Metalmoro MRX, MCR Grand-Am and Protótipo MCR 2.1 were the cars winners from Metalmoro.)
8	(Germany) Mercedes-Benz
4	(Brazil) MC Tubarão (Note: Tubarão IX was the car winner from MC Tubarão.) (Germany) Porsche
2	(Italy) Ferrari (Germany) Audi (United Kingdom) Ginetta (United Kingdom) Aston Martin (France) Ligier
1	(Brazil) PW1 (Note: Spyder Race was the car winner from PW1.) (Germany) Volkswagen (Italy) Lamborghini (United States) Ford (United States) Chevrolet
