= Seletiva de Kart Petrobras =

The Seletiva de Kart Petrobras is a karting competition in Brazil. The competition is promoted by former racing driver Paulo Carcasci, and sanctioned by the Brazilian autosports federation (Confederação Brasileira de Automobilismo).

== Rules ==
Each year, twelve drivers between 15 and 18 years old are selected to compete. Previous winners are excluded. To be selected for the final event, drivers must pass pre-selection. The organization designates rounds of the national and certain regional karting championships as pre-selection races. The karts are provided by the organization, depending on the hosting track. For the 2017 event, they used Bravar karts powered by a 28HP Biland engine.

The winner of the competition receives R$85,000, and the second-place finisher receives R$8,000. For the 2017 event, an additional prize was added. The winner was selected to compete in the 2017 Mazda Road to Indy Shootout, in this competition Olin Galli was the winner.

== Results ==
Year	Kart track	Location	Winner
1999	Kartódromo Internacional Granja Viana	Cotia, São Paulo	(São Paulo (state)) Danilo Dirani
2000	Kartódromo de Curitiba	Curitiba, Paraná	(Paraná (state)) Júlio Campos
2001	Kartódromo de Tarumã	Viamão, Rio Grande do Sul	(São Paulo (state)) Sérgio Jimenez
2002	Kartódromo Internacional Granja Viana	Cotia, São Paulo	(São Paulo (state)) Rafael Daniel
2003	Kartódromo Internacional de Betim	Belo Horizonte, Minas Gerais	(São Paulo (state)) Rafael Daniel
2004	Kartódromo Dr. Carlos Eduardo Corrêa da Costa	Caraguatatuba, São Paulo	(São Paulo (state)) Rafael Daniel
2005	Kartódromo Internacional de Brasília	Brasília, Distrito Federal	(Paraná (state)) Guilherme de Conto (Graduados A) (Paraná (state)) Gabriel Dias (Graduados B)
2006	Kartódromo de Curitiba	Curitiba, Paraná	(Paraná (state)) Guilerme de Conto (Graduados A) (Federal District (Brazil)) Felipe Guimarães (Graduados B)
2007	Kartódromo de Piracicaba	Piracicaba, São Paulo	(São Paulo (state)) Rafael Suzuki
2008	Kartódromo Internacional Granja Viana	Cotia, São Paulo	(São Paulo (state)) Leonardo Cordeiro
2009	Kartódromo Internacional de Volta Redonda	Volta Redonda, Rio de Janeiro	(Paraná (state)) Jonathan Louis
2010	Kartódromo Schincariol	Itu, São Paulo	(Tocantins) Felipe Fraga
2011	Kartodromo de Registro	Registro, São Paulo	(Federal District (Brazil)) Felipe Guimarães
2012	Kartódromo Internacional M.MOA	Nova Odessa, São Paulo	(Tocantins) João Vieira
2013	Kartódromo Internacional Granja Viana	Cotia, São Paulo	(Rio de Janeiro (state)) Olin Gali
2014	Kartódromo de Guaratinguetá	Guaratinguetá, São Paulo	(São Paulo (state)) Pietro Rimbano
2015	Kartódromo Internacional Granja Viana	Cotia, São Paulo	(São Paulo (state)) Vinícius Papareli
2016	Kartódromo Internacional Granja Viana	Cotia, São Paulo	(São Paulo (state)) Marcel Coletta

== Notable other participants ==
- Jeison Teixeira, 10th in 1999
- Allam Khodair, 6th in 1999
- Tuka Rocha, 7th in 1999, 9th in 1999
- Lico Kaesemodel, 11th in 2000
- Roberto Streit, 2nd in 1999, 12th in 2000
- Ana Beatriz, 4th in 2001, 7th in 2002, 2nd in 2003
- Raphael Matos, 6th in 2001
- Ruben Carrapatoso, 2nd in 2002
- Diego Nunes, 8th in 2002
- Galid Osman, 9th in 2002
- Mario Romancini, 3rd in 2004
- Fabiano Machado, 5th in 2005 Graduados B, 5th in 2006 Graduados A
- Leonardo Cordeiro, 4th in 2005 Graduados B, 9th in 2006 Graduados A
- Clemente de Faria Jr., 4th in 2004, 3rd 2005 Graduados A
- Nestor Girolami, 10th in 2006 Graduados A
- César Ramos, 3rd in 2006 Graduados A, 2nd in 2007
- Pipo Derani, 11th in 2008
- Felipe Nasr, 8th in 2008
- Bruno Bonifacio, 10th in 2009
- Claudio Cantelli, 8th in 2009
- Pietro Fantin, 7th in 2009
- Victor Franzoni, 8th in 2010
- Vitor Baptista, 7th in 2013, 8th in 2014
- Matheus Leist, 2nd in 2013, 3rd in 2014
