= Metalmoro JLM AJR =

Sports Prototype race car

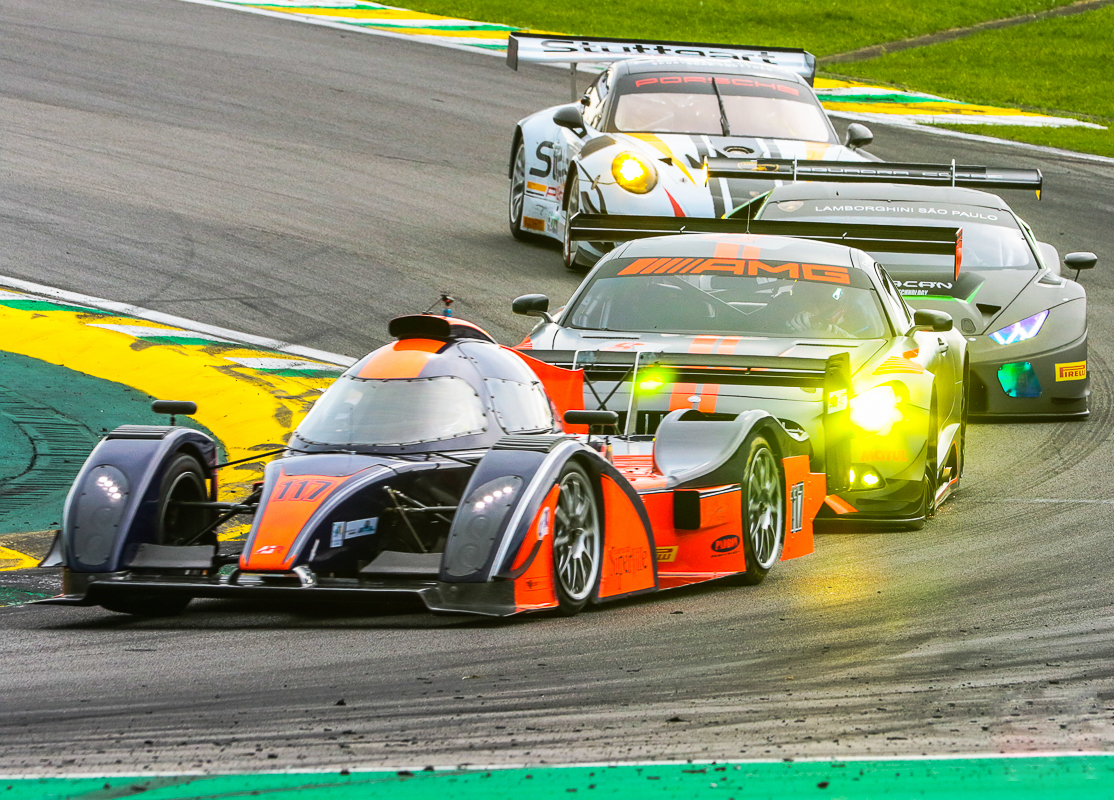
- JLM AJR at the 500km of São Paulo
- Category: Prototype
- Constructor: Metalmoro
- Designer(s): Silue Gossling; Juliano Moro; Enzo Brocker
- Production: 2017-present

Technical specifications
- Chassis: Steel tubular spaceframe, carbon fiber composite body
- Suspension: double wishbones, coil springs over adjustable shock absorbers
- Engine: Chevrolet LS3 6.2–6.9 L (378.3–421.1 cu in) 90° OHV V8 naturally-aspirated Honda K20 2.4 L (146.5 cu in) DOHC I4 turbocharged Rear
- Transmission: 6-speed sequential semi-automatic
- Power: 593 hp (442 kW) 516 lb⋅ft (700 N⋅m) torque (Chevrolet V8 engine); 585 hp (436 kW) 490 lb⋅ft (660 N⋅m) torque (Honda I4 turbo engine)
- Weight: 920–950 kg (2,030–2,090 lb)

Competition history
- Notable entrants: (Brazil) MC Tubarão (Brazil) JLM Racing

The Metalmoro JLM AJR is a sports prototype race car, designed, developed and built by Brazilian manufacturer Metalmoro, for endurance sports car racing, in 2017. It was designed by Silue Gossling, Juliano Moro and Enzo Brocker beginning in 2015. The project utilized the SolidWorks modeling software as a basis. It uses either a Chevrolet LS3 or a Honda K20 engine depending on the entrant.

== Marketing ==
The JLM AJR is a playable car in the Automobilista 2 video game since its launch in 2020.
