= Squadra G-Force =

Brazilian motor racing team

(Brazil) Squadra G-Force
- Founded: 2014
- Team principal(s): Edson Casagrande; Julio Campos; Guilherme Ferro
- Noted drivers: Júlio Campos; Gabriel Casagrande; Sergio Jimenez

Squadra G-Force (formerly known as C2 Team) was a Brazilian motor racing team based in Curitiba, Paraná that competed in the Stock Car Brasil between 2014 and 2018. The team was formed in 2014 as C2 Team by Edson Casagrande and Júlio Campos after they bought Gramacho Competições team.

At the end of 2016, Casagrande and Campos left the team sitting out the 2017 season. The team returned in 2018 after Guilherme Ferro who was the crew chief of the team decided to continue with the project renaming to Squadra G-Force. After five rounds the team abandoned the series and closed.
