= Renan Guerra =

Brazilian racing driver (born 1989)

- Nationality: Brazilian
- Born: 21 May 1989 (age 37) São Paulo, Brazil

Championship titles
- 2019, 2022 Império Endurance Brasil; 2022, Porsche Cup Brasil Endurance

Renan Guerra (born 21 May 1988) is a Brazilian racing driver who is set to compete with AMattheis Motorsport in Stock Car Pro Series. He won two times the Império Endurance Brasil and one time Porsche Carrera Cup Brasil endurance champion.

== Complete Stock Car Pro Series results ==
(key) (Races in bold indicate pole position) (Races in italics indicate fastest lap)

Year	Team	Car	1	2	3	4	5	6	7	8	9	10	11	12	13	14	15	16	17	18	19	20	21	22	23	Rank	Points
2022	Shell V-Power	Chevrolet Cruze	INT; 1; 13	GOI; 1	GOI; 2	RIO; 1	RIO; 2	VCA; 1	VCA; 2	BRA; 1	BRA; 2	BRA; 1	BRA; 2	INT; 1	INT; 2	SCZ; 1	SCZ; 2	VCA; 1	VCA; 2	GOI; 1	GOI; 2	GOI; 1	GOI; 2	BRA; 1	BRA; 2	NC†	0

^{†} As Guerra was a guest driver, he was ineligible for points.
