= 2015 Mercedes-Benz Challenge season =

Car racing competition

The 2015 Mercedes-Benz Challenge was the fifth season of the Mercedes-Benz Challenge. It began at Goiânia in March, and ended at Interlagos in December. In 2015 Mercedes-Benz Challenge was integrated at Stock Car Brasil events.

== Entry list ==
- CLA AMG Cup drivers compete utilising the Mercedes-Benz CLA AMG while C250 Cup drivers use the Mercedes-Benz C250.

2015 Entry List
| Team | No. | Driver | Rounds |
CLA AMG Cup
| RSports Racing | 3 | (Santa Catarina (state)) Cristian Mohr | 1–2 |
| WCR | 6 | (Rio Grande do Sul) Fernando Júnior | 1–2 |
| CKR Racing | 10 | (Rio Grande do Sul) Pierre Ventura | 1–2 |
| CKR Racing | 46 | (Rio Grande do Sul) Carlos Kray | 1–2 |
| De Nigris/Europamotors | 11 | (São Paulo (state)) Neto de Nigris | 1–2 |
| De Nigris/Europamotors | 57 | (São Paulo (state)) Rodney Felicio | 1–2 |
| Blau Motorsport | 16 | (São Paulo (state)) Marcelo Hahn | 1–2 |
| Linardi Sports | 17 | (São Paulo (state)) Linneu Linardi | 1 |
| Mottin Racing | 18 | (Rio Grande do Sul) Guilherne Daudt | 1–2 |
| Mottin Racing | 18 | (Rio Grande do Sul) Fernando Poeta | 1–2 |
| Mottin Racing | 19 | (Rio Grande do Sul) Luis Carlos Ribeiro | 2 |
| Mottin Racing | 20 | (Rio Grande do Sul) Roger Sandoval | 2 |
| Mottin Racing | 32 | (São Paulo (state)) Fernando Fortes | 1–2 |
| VB Motorsport | 26 | (São Paulo (state)) Claudio Dahruj | 1 |
| Cordova Motorsports | 33 | (Ceará) Adriano Rabelo | 1–2 |
| Cordova Motorsports | 44 | (São Paulo (state)) Cesare Marrucci | 1–2 |
| Hitech Racing | 37 | (Paraná (state)) Lorenzo Varassin | 1–2 |
| Hitech Racing | 37 | (Paraná (state)) Paulo Varassin | 1–2 |
| LT Team | 56 | (Mato Grosso do Sul) Peter Feter | 1–2 |
| CenterBus Sambaiba Racing | 60 | (São Paulo (state)) Betão Fonseca | 1–2 |
| CenterBus Sambaiba Racing | 61 | (São Paulo (state)) César Fonseca | 1–2 |
| Scuderia 111 | 76 | (São Paulo (state)) Danilo Pinto | 1 |
| Comark Racing | 77 | (São Paulo (state)) Arnaldo Diniz Filho | 1–2 |
| Fiolux RSports Racing | 88 | (São Paulo (state)) Victor Amorim | 1–2 |
| Fiolux RSports Racing | 88 | (São Paulo (state)) Fernando Amorim | 1–2 |
C250 Cup
| Paioli Racing | 7 | (Espírito Santo) Betinho Sartorio | 1–2 |
| Paioli Racing | 21 | (São Paulo (state)) Peter Michael Gottschalk | 1–2 |
| Paioli Racing | 111 | (São Paulo (state)) Marcos Paioli | 1–2 |
| Paioli Racing | 111 | (São Paulo (state)) Peter Gottschalk Jr. | 1–2 |
| Linardi Sports | 9 | (São Paulo (state)) Alexandre Navarro | 1 |
| Divena Racing/RSports Racing | 13 | (São Paulo (state)) Beto Rossi | 1–2 |
| De Nigris/Europamotors | 14 | (São Paulo (state)) Thiago de Nigris | 2 |
| De Nigris/Europamotors | 14 | (São Paulo (state)) Theo de Nigris | 2 |
| Hot Car Competições | 26 | (Rio de Janeiro (state)) Flavio Andrade | 1–2 |
| KFF | 49 | (São Paulo (state)) Mauricio Lund | 1 |
| CenterBus Sambaiba Racing | 62 | (São Paulo (state)) Christian Germano | 1–2 |
| CenterBus Sambaiba Racing | 63 | (São Paulo (state)) Márcio Basso | 1–2 |
| WCR | 97 | (Rio Grande do Sul) Luis Sergio Sena, Jr. | 1–2 |
| WCR | 97 | (Rio Grande do Sul) Cleiton Campos | 1–2 |
| RSports | 186 | (São Paulo (state)) Edson Ferreira | 1–2 |
| RSports | 225 | (Santa Catarina (state)) Max Mohr | 1–2 |
