= 2017 Mercedes-Benz Challenge season =

Car racing competition

The 2017 Mercedes-Benz Challenge is the seventh season of the Mercedes-Benz Challenge.

Fernando Júnior finished the season as the champion.

== Entry list ==
- CLA AMG Cup drivers compete utilising the Mercedes-Benz CLA AMG while C250 Cup drivers use the Mercedes-Benz C250. All drivers were Brazilian-registered, excepting Jared Wilson, who raced under American racing license, and João Lemos, who raced under Portuguese racing license.

2017 Entry List
Team	No.	Driver	Rounds
CLA AMG Cup
WCR	3	Cristian Mohr	1–2
WCR	6	Fernando Júnior	All
WCR	90	José Vitte	All
Cordova Motorsports	10	Pierre Ventura	1–6, 8
Cordova Motorsports	27	Paulo Varassin	1–5
Cordova Motorsports	33	Adriano Rabelo	1, 3–5, 7–8
Cordova Motorsports	37	Lorenzo Varassin	1–6
Cordova Motorsports	76	Danílo Pinto	1–5, 8
L3 Motorsport	11	Neto de Nigris	1
Mottin Racing	15	Raijan Mascarello	All
Mottin Racing	20	Roger Sandoval	All
Mottin/Sul Racing	18	Fernando Poeta	1–3, 5–7
Mottin/Sul Racing	18	Alexandre Buneder	2, 6
Mottin/Sul Racing	88	Fernando Amorim	All
Mottin/Sul Racing	118	Sergio Ribas	8
Ourocar	19	Luis Carlos Ribeiro	All
Bardahl Hot Car	55	Fábio Escorpioni	All
Center Bus Sambaiba Racing	60	Betão Fonseca	All
Center Bus Sambaiba Racing	61	César Fonseca	1
Center Bus Sambaiba Racing	62	Jared Wilson	8
Comark Racing	77	Arnaldo Diniz Filho	4, 8
RSports Racing	110	Bruno Alvarenga	7–8
RSports Racing	110	Leandro Romera	8
RSports Racing	555	Renato Braga	1–6
C250 Cup
RSports Racing	9	Alexandre Navarro	All
RSports Racing	40	Ydenis Roberto de Souza	1–3
RSports Racing	40	Bruno Alvarenga	1–4
RSports Racing	51	Leandro Reis	7
RSports Racing	84	Cello Nunes	1–7
RSports Racing	155	Marcelo Lozasso	8
RSports Racing	225	Max Mohr	1
PGL Racing	12	André Moraes Jr.	All
PGL Racing	41	João Lemos	All
Paioli Racing	13	Beto Rossi	All
Paioli Racing	21	Peter Michael Gottschalk	1, 3–8
Paioli Racing	111	Marcos Paioli	1, 3–8
Paioli Racing	111	Peter Gottschalk Jr.	1, 3–5
Bardahl Hot Car	26	Flávio Andrade	All
Bardahl Hot Car	225	Max Mohr	2
Friato/DCM	45	Guiseppe Vecci	1
Center Bus Sambaiba Racing	63	Ciro Lobo	1–6, 8
Center Bus Sambaiba Racing	63	Fabio Peterson	All
Center Bus Sambaiba Racing	64	Carlos Alberto Guilherme	All
Center Bus Sambaiba Racing	64	Sérgio Kuba	All
Center Bus Sambaiba Racing	65	Claudio Simão	All
Center Bus Sambaiba Racing	66	Fernando Pessoa	1–2
Center Bus Sambaiba Racing	67	Luiz Barcelos	All
Center Bus Sambaiba Racing	68	Carlos Machado	All
Center Bus Sambaiba Racing	69	Rudinei Sabino	1–2
Center Bus Sambaiba Racing	166	Angelo Giombelli	8
Center Bus Sambaiba Racing	169	Sergio Maggi	8
Brandão Motorsport	29	Vinicius Fugi	7–8
Brandão Motorsport	73	Raphael Teixeira	All
Brandão Motorsport	73	Rodrigo Cruvinel	All

== Race calendar and results ==
All races were held in Brazil.

Round	Circuit	Date	Pole position	Fastest lap	Winning driver	Winning team	C250 Cup winner
1	Autódromo Internacional Ayrton Senna	April 2	Lorenzo Varassin	Fernando Júnior	Fernando Júnior	WCR	Claudio Simão
2	Autódromo Internacional de Santa Cruz do Sul	May 21	Lorenzo Varassin	Fernando Junior	Lorenzo Varassin	Cordova Motorsports	Max Mohr
3	Autódromo Internacional de Curitiba	July 2	Adriano Rabelo	Paulo Varassim	Fernando Júnior	WCR	Raphael Teixeira; Rodrigo Cruvinel
4	Autódromo Velo Città	August 6	Fernando Júnior	Fernando Júnior	Fernando Júnior	WCR	André Moraes Jr
5	Autódromo Internacional Ayrton Senna	September 10	Betão Fonseca	Raijan Mascarello	Raijan Mascarello	Mottin Racing	Claudio Simão
6	Autódromo Internacional de Tarumã	October 22	Betão Fonseca	Lorenzo Varassim	Luiz Carlos Ribeiro	Charruá Ourocar	Marcos Paioli
7	Autódromo Internacional Ayrton Senna (Goiânia)	November 19	Adriano Rabelo	José Vitte	José Vitte	WCR	Marcos Paioli
8	Autódromo José Carlos Pace	December 10	Roger Sandoval	Roger Sandoval	Roger Sandoval	Mottin Racing	Marcos Paioli

== Championship standings ==
Points system

Points are awarded for each race at an event to the driver/s of a car that completed at least 75% of the race distance and was running at the completion of the race.

Points format	Position															
Points format	1st	2nd	3rd	4th	5th	6th	7th	8th	9th	10th	11th	12th	13th	14th	15th	Pole
Race	20	17	15	13	11	10	9	8	7	6	5	4	3	2	1	1
Final race	40	34	30	26	22	20	18	16	14	12	10	8	6	4	2	2

- Race: Used for the first to seventh round.
- Final race: Used for the last round of the season with double points.

=== Drivers' Championship ===
Pos	Driver	GOI	SCZ	CUR	VCA	LON	TAR	GOI	INT	Pts
CLA AMG Cup
1	Fernando Júnior	1	3	1	**1**	3	Ret	9	4	98
2	Betão Fonseca	3	4	6	17	**2**	**10**	7	7	79
3	José Vitte	5	6	3	3	Ret	14	1	2	78
4	Roger Sandoval	Ret	5	2	2	6	8	5	**1**	75
5	Raijan Mascarello	12	Ret	8	7	1	2	6	3	68
6	Luiz Carlos Ribeiro	Ret	2	DSQ	5	4	1	Ret	8	61
7	Pierre Ventura	8	DSQ	5	6	5	4	16	5	59
8	Lorenzo Varassin	**10**	**1**	7	10	7	Ret			52
9	Adriano Rabelo	2		**DSQ**	4	Ret		**2**	6	49
10	Fernando Poeta	11	8	11		8	3	8		49
11	Fernando Amorim	6	Ret	10	25	10	5	4		49
12	Fabio Escorpioni	9	9	12	Ret	11	6	3		48
13	Renato Braga	7	7	4	22	12	16			45
14	Paulo Varassin	13	13	9	8	9				30
15	Alexandre Buneder		8				3			23
16	Cristian Mohr	4	27							17
17	Danilo Pinto	Ret	10	22	9	Ret				16
18	Bruno Alvarenga							21		2
19	Cesar Fonseca	18								2
	Arnaldo Diniz Filho				DSQ					
	Neto de Nigris	DNS								
C250 Cup
1	Claudio Simão	**15**	17	15	13	13	12	17		103
2	Marcos Paioli	17		**16**	**15**	19	**6**	**10**		92
3	André Moraes Jr.	16	**15**	Ret	11	15	13	12		92
4	Flávio Andrade	20	14	17	14	18	15	11		86
5	João Lemos	26	20	14	20	**14**	9	15		80
6	Raphael Teixeira; Rodrigo Cruvinel	18	12	13	16	22	19	Ret		73
7	Cello Nunes	28	18	19	23	17	11	22		56
8	Peter Gottschalk Jr.	17		**16**	**15**	19				50
9	Beto Rossi	22	22	Ret	18	20	18	14		49
10	Peter Michel Gottschalk	19		DSQ	12	25	22	13		48
11	Carlos Machado	27	24	20	19	21	17	20		44
12	Alexandre Navarro	23	16	18	Ret	16	Ret	26		42
13	Max Mohr	21	11							29
14	Fabio Peterson	31	26	24	24	23	23	19		25
15	Luiz Barcellos	24	25	23	Ret	Ret	20	24		23
16	Carlos Alberto Guilherme; Sérgio Kuba	25	Ret	Ret	21	24	21	25		22
17	Ciro Lobo	31	26	24	24	23	23			18
18	Bruno Alvarenga	33	19	21	Ret					15
19	Ydenis Roberto de Souza	33	19	21						15
20	Leandro Reis							18		6
21	Fernando Pessoa	32	21							6
22	Rudinei Sabino	30	23							4
23	Vinicius Fugi							23		4
24	Giusepe Vecci	29								1
Pos	Driver	GOI	SCZ	CUR	VCA	LON	TAR	GOI	INT	Pts

Colour	Result
Gold	Winner
Silver	Second place
Bronze	Third place
Green	Points classification
Blue	Non-points classification
Blue	Non-classified finish (NC)
Purple	Retired, not classified (Ret)
Red	Did not qualify (DNQ)
Red	Did not pre-qualify (DNPQ)
Black	Disqualified (DSQ)
White	Did not start (DNS)
White	Withdrew (WD)
White	Race cancelled (C)
Blank	Did not practice (DNP)
Blank	Did not arrive (DNA)
Blank	Excluded (EX)

**Bold** – Pole position
Italics – Fastest lap
† – Retired, but classified
