= 2018 Mercedes-Benz Challenge season =

Car racing competition

The 2018 Mercedes-Benz Challenge was the eighth season of the Mercedes-Benz Challenge. Fernando Júnior is the defending champion in the CLA AMG Cup whilst Claudio Simão is the defending champion for the C250 Cup class.

== Teams and drivers ==
Team	No	Driver	Class	Rounds
CLA AMG Cup
CenterBus Sambaiba Racing Team	6	(Brazil) Fernando Júnior		1–5
CenterBus Sambaiba Racing Team	7	(Brazil) Cesar Fonseca	M	5
CenterBus Sambaiba Racing Team	61	(Brazil) Cesar Fonseca	M	1–4
CenterBus Sambaiba Racing Team	60	(Brazil) Betão Fonseca	M	1–5
Mottin Racing	10	(Brazil) Pierre Ventura	M	1–5 (Note: Pierre Ventura raced with the Fernando Amorim entry at Interlagos.)
Mottin Racing	15	(Brazil) Raijan Mascarello		1–4 (Note: Raijan Mascarello raced with the Felipe Tozzo entry at Interlagos.)
Mottin Racing	17	(Brazil) Raijan Mascarello		5
Mottin Racing	18	(Brazil) Fernando Poeta	M	2, 4
Mottin Racing	20	(Brazil) Roger Sandoval		1–5 (Note: Roger Sandoval raced with the Fernando Júnior entry at Interlagos.)
Mottin Racing	36	(Brazil) Sergio Ribas	M	1
Mottin Racing	57	(Brazil) Felipe Tozzo		1–5
WCR Team	90	(Brazil) Jose Vitte	M	3–5
OuroCar Racing	19	(Brazil) Luis Carlos Ribeiro		1–5 (Note: Luis Carlos Ribeiro raced with the Cesar Fonseca entry at Interlagos.)
Cordova Motorsports	33	(Brazil) Adriano Rabelo		1–5 (Note: Adriano Rabelo raced with the Betão Fonseca entry at Interlagos.)
Cordova Motorsports	84	(Brazil) Cello Nunes		1–5
Bardahl Hot Car	44	(Brazil) Cesare Marrucci	M	1–5
Bardahl Hot Car	55	(Brazil) Fabio Scorpioni		1–5
Bardahl Hot Car	55	(Brazil) Renato Braga		3
Bardahl Hot Car	88	(Brazil) Fernando Amorim	M	1–4
C250 Cup
AN 09	5	(Brazil) Paulo Rosa	M	1
AN 09	9	(Brazil) Alexandre Navarro	M	1, 3
AN 09	9	(Brazil) Leandro Romera		3
Bardahl Hot Car	12	(Brazil) André Moraes Jr.		1–5
Bardahl Hot Car	26	(Brazil) Flavio Andrade	M	1–5
PGL Racing	14	(Brazil) Júnior Victorette		1, 3–5
PGL Racing	41	(Portugal) João Lemos	M	1–5
Paioli Racing	21	(Brazil) Peter M Gottschalk		1–5
Paioli Racing	58	(Brazil) Claudio Simão	M	2–5
Paioli Racing	111	(Brazil) Beto Rossi	M	1–5
Paioli Racing	111	(Brazil) Marcos Paioli	M	1–5
CenterBus Sambaiba Racing Team	22	(Brazil) Paulo Gomes	M	5
CenterBus Sambaiba Racing Team	62	(United States) Jared Wilson		3, 5
CenterBus Sambaiba Racing Team	64	(Brazil) Roberto Santos	M	2–3, 5
CenterBus Sambaiba Racing Team	65	(Brazil) Pedro Muffato	M	1
CenterBus Sambaiba Racing Team	65	(Brazil) Luiz Fernando Barcellos	M	3
CenterBus Sambaiba Racing Team	65	(Brazil) Alencar Jr.	M	5
CenterBus Sambaiba Racing Team	66	(Brazil) Luc Monteiro		3
CenterBus Sambaiba Racing Team	67	(Brazil) Ângelo Giombelli	M	1, 3
CenterBus Sambaiba Racing Team	69	(Brazil) Mateus Pamplona		2
CenterBus Sambaiba Racing Team	69	(Brazil) Cesar Pamplona		2
CenterBus Sambaiba Racing Team	669	(Brazil) Rodrigo Soares		3, 5
WCR Team	225	(Brazil) Max Mohr	M	2–5
Brandão Motorsport	227	(Brazil) Miro Cruz		2–5

Icon	Class
M	Masters

== Race calendar and results ==
The entire championship will be accompanied by the Copa Truck in eight of the nine stages of the category, with exercise of the stage of Buenos Aires, counting with a stage in the Autódromo de Rivera in Uruguay.

Round	Circuit	Date	Pole position	Fastest lap	Winning driver	Winning team	C250 Cup winner
1	(Brazil) Autódromo Internacional de Cascavel	March 25	(Brazil) Roger Sandoval	(Brazil) Adriano Rabelo	(Brazil) Raijan Mascarello	Mottin Racing	(Brazil) Peter M Gottschalk
2	(Brazil) Autódromo Internacional de Guaporé	April 15	(Brazil) Adriano Rabelo	(Brazil) Felipe Tozzo	(Brazil) Betão Fonseca	Sambaiba Racing Team	(Portugal) João Lemos
3	(Brazil) Autódromo José Carlos Pace	May 27	(Brazil) Felipe Tozzo (Brazil) Raijan Mascarello	(Brazil) Betão Fonseca (Brazil) Adriano Rabelo	(Brazil) Betão Fonseca (Brazil) Adriano Rabelo	Sambaiba Racing Team	(Brazil) Peter M Gottschalk
4	(Brazil) Autódromo Internacional Orlando Moura	July 29	(Brazil) Felipe Tozzo	(Brazil) Raijan Mascarello	(Brazil) Fernando Júnior	Sambaiba Racing Team	(Brazil) André Moraes Jr.
5	(Brazil) Autódromo Internacional Ayrton Senna (Goiânia)	August 26	(Brazil) Felipe Tozzo	(Brazil) Felipe Tozzo	(Brazil) Felipe Tozzo	Mottin Racing	(Brazil) André Moraes Jr.
6	(Uruguay) Autódromo Eduardo Prudêncio Cabrera	October 7	(Brazil) Raijan Mascarello	(Brazil) Raijan Mascarello	(Brazil) Raijan Mascarello	Mottin Racing	(Brazil) André Moraes Jr.
7	(Brazil) Circuito dos Cristais	October 28	(Brazil) Roger Sandoval	(Brazil) Fabio Scorpioni	(Brazil) Raijan Mascarello	Mottin Racing	(Brazil) André Moraes Jr.
8	(Brazil) Autódromo Internacional de Curitiba	December 2	(Brazil) Roger Sandoval	(Brazil) Felipe Tozzo	(Brazil) Roger Sandoval	Mottin Racing	(Brazil) André Moraes Jr.
