= 2016 Mercedes-Benz Challenge season =

Car racing competition

The 2016 Mercedes-Benz Challenge is the sixth season of the Mercedes-Benz Challenge.

== Entry list ==
- CLA AMG Cup drivers compete utilising the Mercedes-Benz CLA AMG while C250 Cup drivers use the Mercedes-Benz C250. All drivers were Brazilian-registered, excepting João Lemos, who raced under Portuguese racing license.

2016 Entry List
Team	No.	Driver	Rounds
CLA AMG Cup
WCR	3	Cristian Mohr	3–8
WCR	6	Fernando Júnior	1, 3–4
CKR Racing	10	Pierre Ventura	All
CKR Racing	46	Carlos Kray	All
CKR Racing	46	Henrique Assunção	All
Blau Motorsport	16	Marcelo Hahn	1, 4–8
Blau Motorsport	16	Victor Guerin	5
Mottin Racing	20	Roger Sandoval	All
Mottin Racing	32	Fernando Fortes	All
Mottin Racing	45	Paulo Tortaro	3–5
Ourocar Racing	19	Luis Carlos Ribeiro	All
Cordova Motorsports	33	Adriano Rabelo	All
Cordova Motorsports	37	Lorenzo Varassin	All
Cordova Motorsports	37	Paulo Varassin	1–5, 7–8
Cordova Motorsports	76	Danilo Pinto	5, 7
Cordova Motorsports	90	José Vitte	1, 3–5, 7–8
L3 Motorsport	11	Neto de Nigris	1–5
L3 Motorsport	27	Claudio Dahruj	1–3, 5–8
L3 Motorsport	89	Beto Giorgi	6–8
L3 Motorsport	89	Daniel Paludo	6
L3 Motorsport	89	Claudio Vinicius	7
L3 Motorsport	89	Otávio Mesquita	8
Comark Racing	17	Noberto Gresse	8
Comark Racing	77	Arnaldo Diniz Filho	1–7
Center Bus Sambaiba Racing	60	Betão Fonseca	All
Center Bus Sambaiba Racing	61	César Fonseca	1
Center Bus Sambaiba Racing	62	Gustavo Magnabosco	8
Scuderia 111	45	Paulo Tortaro	1
RSports Racing	3	Cristian Mohr	1–2
RSports Racing	555	Renato Braga	All
Sul Racing	18	Fernando Poeta	All
Sul Racing	76	Danilo Pinto	1
Sul Racing	88	Fernando Amorim	All
C250 Cup
Paioli Racing	7	Betinho Sartorio	1
Paioli Racing	21	Peter Michael Gottschalk	All
Paioli Racing	111	Marcos Paioli	All
Paioli Racing	111	Peter Gottschalk Jr.	All
Hot Car Competições	26	Flavio Andrade	All
Hot Car Competições	100	Matheus Biriba	2, 5–7
Ensite Racing Team	41	João Lemos	2–8
Ensite Racing Team	55	Fábio Escorpioni	All
Center Bus Sambaiba Racing	64	Carlos Alberto Guilherme	All
Center Bus Sambaiba Racing	64	Sérgio Kuba	3–4, 6–8
Center Bus Sambaiba Racing	65	Claudio Simão	All
Center Bus Sambaiba Racing	66	André Paulo Varassin	1
Center Bus Sambaiba Racing	67	Sergio Maggi	2
Center Bus Sambaiba Racing	68	Rodrigo Carvalho	5
Center Bus Sambaiba Racing	166	Vinicius Simão	2, 4
RSports	13	Beto Rossi	All
RSports	13	Ydenis Roberto de Souza	1
RSports	99	Romualdo Magro Júnior	2–4, 6, 8
RSports	99	Ydenis Roberto de Souza	2
RSports	99	Bruno Alvarenga	3–4, 5–7
RSports	225	Max Mohr	1–4, 6
RSports/Yrosfly	40	Ydenis Roberto de Souza	1–3, 5–8
RSports/Yrosfly	40	Arthur Bragantini	3
RSports/Yrosfly	40	Leandro Reis	7–8
Lagoa Racing	73	Raphael Teixeira	2
Sallo Racing	73	Raphael Teixeira	6–8
Sallo Racing	73	Rodrigo Cruvinel	6–8

== Race calendar and results ==
All races were held in Brazil.

Round	Circuit	Date	Pole position	Fastest lap	Winning driver	Winning team	C250 Cup winner
1	Autódromo Internacional de Curitiba	March 6	Arnaldo Dinz Filho	Betão Fonseca	Arnaldo Diniz Filho	Comark Racing	Claudio Simão
2	Autódromo Internacional Ayrton Senna	May 22	Fernando Fortes	Fernando Fortes	Fernando Fortes	Mottin Racing	Marcos Paioli; Peter Gottschalk
3	Autódromo Internacional de Tarumã	June 26	Adriano Rabelo	Adriano Rabelo	Adriano Rabelo	Cordová Motorsport	Marcos Paioli; Peter Gottschalk
4	Autódromo Internacional de Cascavel	July 17	Lorenzo Varassim; Paulo Varassim	Lorenzo Varassim; Paulo Varassim	Marcelo Hahn	Blau Motorsport	Peter Michel Gottschalk
5	Autódromo José Carlos Pace	September 11	Arnaldo Diniz Filho	Adriano Rabelo	Arnaldo Diniz Filho	Comark Racing	Claudio Simão
6	Autódromo Internacional de Curitiba	October 16	Lorenzo Varassim; Paulo Varassim	Betão Fonseca	Cristian Mohr	WCR	Fabio Escorpioni
7	Autódromo Internacional Ayrton Senna	November 6	Adriano Rabelo	Fernando Fortes	Betão Fonseca	CenterBus Sambaiba Racing	Peter MichaelGottschalk
8	Autódromo José Carlos Pace	December 11	Fernando Fortes	Fernando Fortes	Adriano Rabelo	Cordova Motorsport	Marcos Paioli; Peter Gottschalk
