= Mercedes-Benz Challenge =

Car racing competition

- Category: Sports Car
- Country: Brazil
- Inaugural season: 2011
- Constructors: Mercedes-Benz
- Tyre suppliers: Pirelli
- Drivers' champion: CLA AMG Cup (São Paulo (state)) Arnaldo Diniz Filho; C250 Cup: (Santa Catarina (state)) Cristian Mohr
- Official website: mbchallenge.com

Mercedes-Benz Challenge previously known as Mercedes-Benz Grand Challenge, is a single-make sports car racing series based in the Brazil organized by Mais Brasil Esportes and Mercedes-Benz. In 2018, the championship runs alongside Copa Truck series and will make its first international appearance this October in Rivera, Uruguay.

== Champions ==
Season	Class	Driver	Car
2011	C250 Cup	João Campos; Márcio Campos	Sicredi Racing
2012	C250 Cup	João Campos; Márcio Campos	Sicredi Racing
2013	C250 Cup	Márcio Campos	Sicredi Racing
2014	CLA AMG Cup	Arnaldo Diniz Filho	Comark Racing
2014	C250 Cup	Cristian Mohr	Rsports Racing
2015	CLA AMG Cup	Fernando Júnior	WCR
2015	C250 Cup	Peter Michael Gottschalk	Paioli Racing
2016	CLA AMG Cup	Luis Carlos Ribeiro	Ourocar
2016	C250 Cup	Peter Michael Gottschalk	Paioli Racing
2017	CLA AMG Cup	Fernando Júnior	WCR
2017	C250 Cup	Marcos Paioli	Paioli Racing
2018	CLA AMG Cup	Raijan Mascarello	Mottin Racing
2018	C250 Cup	André Moraes Jr	Bardahl Hot Car
2019	CLA AMG Cup	Fernando Júnior	CenterBus Sambaiba Racing Team
2019	C250 Cup	Claudio Simão	CenterBus Sambaiba Racing Team
