= 2012 Formula 3 Sudamericana season =

2012 Formula 3 Sudamericana

Seasons
- ← 2011 2013 →

The 2012 Formula 3 Sudamericana season was the 26th Formula 3 Sudamericana season. It began on 22 July 2012, at Autódromo Internacional de Curitiba, and ended on 2 December on the same circuit. After a year more complicated of the category, Formula 3 Sudamericana becomes organized by Vicar, the same of Stock Car Brasil and Brasileiro de Marcas.

After winning the light class in 2010, Fernando Resende won the main class, the fourth successive title of Césario Fórmula team. On the light class Césario Fórmula driver Higor Hoffman won the championship. The 2012 season was marked by only three drivers racing in all rounds and with no driver and race outside Brazil.

== Drivers and teams ==
- All cars were powered by Berta engines, and ran on Pirelli tyres. All drivers were Brazilian registered.

Team	No.	Driver	Chassis	Rounds
Class A
(Brazil) Cesário Fórmula	1	(Brazil) Fernando Resende	Dallara F309	1–2
(Brazil) Cesário Fórmula	1	(Brazil) Rodrigo Gonzalez	Dallara F309	3–6
(Brazil) Cesário Fórmula	2	(Brazil) Carlos Padovan	Dallara F309	3
(Brazil) Cesário Fórmula	2	(Brazil) Ramon Matias	Dallara F309	4
(Brazil) Cesário Fórmula	2	(Brazil) Fernando Resende	Dallara F309	5–6
(United Kingdom) Hitech Racing	3	(Brazil) Nicolas Costa	Dallara F309	1
(United Kingdom) Hitech Racing	3	(Brazil) Gustavo Myasava	Dallara F309	2
(United Kingdom) Hitech Racing	3	(Brazil) Christian Castro	Dallara F309	3
(United Kingdom) Hitech Racing	3	(Brazil) Felipe Guimarães	Dallara F309	4–6
(United Kingdom) Hitech Racing	4	(Brazil) Gabriel Casagrande	Dallara F309	1
(United Kingdom) Hitech Racing	4	(Brazil) Pedro Nunes	Dallara F309	2
(United Kingdom) Hitech Racing	4	(Brazil) Gustavo Frigotto	Dallara F309	3, 6
(United Kingdom) Hitech Racing	4	(Brazil) Christian Castro	Dallara F309	4
(United Kingdom) Hitech Racing	4	(Brazil) Mathues Stumpf	Dallara F309	4
(United Kingdom) Hitech Racing	5	(Brazil) Lucas Biagioni	Dallara F309	1
(United Kingdom) Hitech Racing	99	(Brazil) Nicolas Costa	Dallara F309	5
(Brazil) Bassan Motorsport	11	(Brazil) André Pedralli	Dallara F309	1–2, 5
(Brazil) Kemba Racing	28	(Brazil) Leonardo de Souza	Dallara F309	All
Class B
(Brazil) Capital Motorsport	2	(Brazil) Eduardo Banzoli	Dallara F301	1–2
(Brazil) Capital Motorsport	26	(Brazil) Eduardo Banzoli	Dallara F301	5
(Brazil) Cesário Fórmula	31	(Brazil) Higor Hoffman	Dallara F301	All
(Brazil) Cesário Fórmula	32	(Brazil) Felipe Polehtto	Dallara F301	2
(Brazil) Cesário Fórmula	32	(Brazil) Pedro Castro	Dallara F301	3
(Brazil) Cesário Fórmula	32	(Brazil) Fernando Stédile	Dallara F301	4
(Brazil) Cesário Fórmula	77	(Brazil) Felipe Lapenna	Dallara F301	5
(Brazil) Chemim Racing	14	(Brazil) Luis Carlos Abbade	Dallara F301	4
(Brazil) EMB Racing	22	(Brazil) Lucas de La Vega	Dallara F301	1–4
(Brazil) Baumer Racing	33	(Brazil) Lucilio Baumer	Dallara F301	6
(Brazil) Dragão Motorsport	37	(Brazil) Luir Miranda	Dallara F301	2, 6
(Brazil) RR Racing Team	38	(Brazil) Raphael Raucci	Dallara F301	All

== Race calendar and results ==
All rounds were held in Brazil.

Round		Circuit	Date	Pole position	Fastest lap	Winning driver	Winning team	Class B winner
1	R1	Autódromo Internacional de Curitiba	21 July	(Brazil) Nicolas Costa	(Brazil) Nicolas Costa	(Brazil) Nicolas Costa	(United Kingdom) Hitech Racing	(Brazil) Raphael Raucci
1	R2	Autódromo Internacional de Curitiba	22 July		(Brazil) Nicolas Costa	(Brazil) Fernando Resende	(Brazil) Césario Fórmula	(Brazil) Higor Hoffman
2	R1	Autódromo Internacional Nelson Piquet	4 August	(Brazil) Pedro Nunes	(Brazil) Fernando Resende	(Brazil) Pedro Nunes	(United Kingdom) Hitech Racing	(Brazil) Higor Hoffman
2	R2	Autódromo Internacional Nelson Piquet	5 August		(Brazil) Fernando Resende	(Brazil) Fernando Resende	(Brazil) Césario Fórmula	(Brazil) Higor Hoffman
3	R1	Velopark, Nova Santa Rita	22 September	(Brazil) Higor Hoffman	(Brazil) Higor Hoffman	(Brazil) Rodrigo Gonzalez	(Brazil) Césario Fórmula	(Brazil) Lucas de La Vega
3	R2	Velopark, Nova Santa Rita	23 September		(Brazil) Christian Castro	(Brazil) Leonardo de Souza	(Brazil) Kemba Racing	(Brazil) Raphael Raucci
4	R1	Autódromo Internacional de Tarumã	27 October	(Brazil) Felipe Guimarães	(Brazil) Felipe Guimarães	(Brazil) Felipe Guimarães	(United Kingdom) Hitech Racing	(Brazil) Raphael Raucci
4	R2	Autódromo Internacional de Tarumã	28 October		(Brazil) Rodrigo Gonzalez	(Brazil) Felipe Guimarães	(United Kingdom) Hitech Racing	(Brazil) Raphael Raucci
5	R1	Autódromo Internacional Ayrton Senna	17 November	(Brazil) Felipe Guimarães	(Brazil) Fernando Resende	(Brazil) Fernando Resende	(Brazil) Césario Fórmula	(Brazil) Higor Hoffman
5	R2	Autódromo Internacional Ayrton Senna	18 November		(Brazil) Felipe Guimarães	(Brazil) Felipe Guimarães	(United Kingdom) Hitech Racing	(Brazil) Higor Hoffman
6	R1	Autódromo Internacional de Curitiba	1 December	(Brazil) Fernando Resende	(Brazil) Felipe Guimarães	(Brazil) Felipe Guimarães	(United Kingdom) Hitech Racing	(Brazil) Higor Hoffman
6	R2	Autódromo Internacional de Curitiba	2 December		(Brazil) Fernando Resende	(Brazil) Higor Hoffman	(Brazil) Césario Fórmula	(Brazil) Higor Hoffman

== Championship standings ==
- Points were awarded as follows:

1	2	3	4	5	6	7	8	9	10
20	15	12	10	8	6	4	3	2	1

=== Drivers' Championship ===
Pos	Driver	CUR		RIO		VEL		TAR		LON		CUR		Pts
Class A
1	(Brazil) Fernando Resende	2	1	2	1					1	7	**3**	Ret	112
2	(Brazil) Rodrigo Gonzalez					1	DSQ	4	2	6	3	DSQ	4	87
3	(Brazil) Leonardo de Souza	Ret	Ret	Ret	7	2	1	Ret	3	2	Ret	Ret	6	84
4	(Brazil) Felipe Guimarães							**1**	1	**Ret**	1	1	Ret	80
5	(Brazil) André Pedralli	3	3	3	2					4	5			75
6	(Brazil) Gustavo Frigotto					4	5					2	3	57
7	(Brazil) Christian Castro					**3**	3	6	4†					37
8	(Brazil) Nicolas Costa	**1**	2							DNS	DNS			35
9	(Brazil) Pedro Nunes			**1**	6									32
10	(Brazil) Gabriel Casagrande	4	7											20
11	(Brazil) Ramon Matias							2	Ret					15
12	(Brazil) Mathues Stumpf							6†	4					10
	(Brazil) Lucas Biagioni	Ret	Ret											0
	(Brazil) Gustavo Myasava			Ret	Ret									0
	(Brazil) Carlos Padovan					Ret	Ret							0
Class B
1	(Brazil) Higor Hoffman	7	4	**4**	3	**Ret**	Ret	**5**	6	**3**	2	**4**	1	182
1	(Brazil) Raphael Raucci	5	5	Ret	9	Ret	2	3	5	5	4	Ret	2	142
3	(Brazil) Lucas de La Vega	**8**	6	Ret	8	5	4	7	7					91
4	(Brazil) Eduardo Banzoli	6	Ret	Ret	4					DSQ	6			42
5	(Brazil) Luir Miranda			5	5							Ret	5	39
6	(Brazil) Pedro Castro					6	6							27
7	(Brazil) Luis Carlos Abbade							8	Ret					10
	(Brazil) Fernando Stédile							Ret	Ret					0
	(Brazil) Felipe Lapenna									Ret	Ret			0
	(Brazil) Lucilio Baumer											Ret	Ret	0
	(Brazil) Felipe Polehtto			DNS	Ret									0
Pos	Driver	CUR		RIO		VEL		TAR		LON		CUR		Pts

Colour	Result
Gold	Winner
Silver	Second place
Bronze	Third place
Green	Points classification
Blue	Non-points classification
Blue	Non-classified finish (NC)
Purple	Retired, not classified (Ret)
Red	Did not qualify (DNQ)
Red	Did not pre-qualify (DNPQ)
Black	Disqualified (DSQ)
White	Did not start (DNS)
White	Withdrew (WD)
White	Race cancelled (C)
Blank	Did not practice (DNP)
Blank	Did not arrive (DNA)
Blank	Excluded (EX)

**Bold** – Pole
Italics – Fastest Lap

Notes:

- † — Driver did not race and did not score points for participating with partner.
