= 2013 Formula 3 Sudamericana season =

2013 Formula 3 Sudamericana

Seasons
- ← 2012 2014 →

The 2013 Formula 3 Sudamericana season was the twenty-seventh and final season of the Formula 3 Sudamericana. It begin on 7 April at Interlagos and ended on 1 December at Curitiba, after eighteen races. In 2014 the championship becomes a Brazilian Championship.

== Drivers and teams ==
- All cars are powered by Berta engines, and run on Pirelli tyres.

| Team | No. | Driver | Chassis | Rounds |
Class A
| (Brazil) Cesário F3 | 1 | (Brazil) Higor Hoffmann | Dallara F309 | 1–2, 5 |
| (Brazil) Cesário F3 | 1 | (Brazil) Rodrigo Gonzalez | Dallara F309 | 7 |
| (Brazil) Cesário F3 | 2 | (Brazil) Gustavo Lima | Dallara F309 | 2 |
| (United Kingdom) Hitech Racing | 8 | (Brazil) Gustavo Frigotto | Dallara F309 | 1–2 |
| (United Kingdom) Hitech Racing | 8 | (Brazil) Ayman Darwich | Dallara F309 | 4 |
| (United Kingdom) Hitech Racing | 66 | (Brazil) Felipe Guimarães | Dallara F309 | All |
| (United Kingdom) Hitech Racing | 117 | (Brazil) Gustavo Myasava | Dallara F309 | All |
| (Brazil) RR Racing | 15 | (Brazil) Raphael Raucci | Dallara F309 | All |
| (Brazil) Kemba Racing | 91 | (Brazil) Leonardo de Souza | Dallara F309 | 5–6, 8–9 |
Class B
| (Brazil) Cesário F3 | 21 | (Brazil) Elias Azevedo | Dallara F301 | 1–2, 5 |
| (Brazil) Cesário F3 | 21 | (Brazil) Ricardo Landucci | Dallara F301 | 8–9 |
| (Brazil) Cesário F3 | 22 | (Brazil) Artur Fortunato | Dallara F301 | 1–2 |
| (Brazil) Cesário F3 | 22 | (Argentina) Federico Moises | Dallara F301 | 3–4 |
| (Brazil) Cesário F3 | 23 | (Argentina) Bruno Etman | Dallara F301 | All |
| (Brazil) Cesário F3 | 28 | (Brazil) Artur Fortunato | Dallara F301 | 3–9 |
| (Brazil) RR Racing | 11 | (Brazil) Lukas Moraes | Dallara F301 | 9 |
| (Brazil) RR Racing | 16 | (Brazil) Gaetano Di Mauro | Dallara F301 | 1–2 |
| (Brazil) RR Racing | 16 | (Brazil) Emilio Padron | Dallara F301 | 4–5 |
| (Brazil) RR Racing | 17 | (Brazil) Rodolfo Toni | Dallara F301 | 1 |
| (Brazil) RR Racing | 17 | (Brazil) Pedro Serrano | Dallara F301 | 5 |
| (Brazil) RR Racing | 53 | (Brazil) Victor Miranda | Dallara F301 | 9 |
| (Brazil) Chenin-CA Racing | 19 | (Brazil) Alexandre Doretto | Dallara F301 | 1 |
| (Brazil) EMB Racing | 25 | (United States) Nicholas Silva | Dallara F301 | 1, 4 |
| (Brazil) Capital Motorsport | 26 | (Brazil) Eduardo Banzoli | Dallara F301 | 1, 4 |
| (Brazil) Baumer Racing | 33 | (Brazil) Lucilio Baumer | Dallara F301 | 5 |

== Race calendar and results ==
A calendar for the 2013 season was released on 21 December 2012, with all Brazilian rounds supporting Brasileiro de Marcas events. A round in Argentina was also scheduled, with the venue later confirmed as the Autódromo Ciudad de Concordia, supporting the TC 2000 Championship.

| Rnd | Race | Circuit | Date | Pole position | Fastest lap | Winning driver | Winning team | Class B winner |
|---|---|---|---|---|---|---|---|---|
| 1 | R1 | (Brazil) Autódromo José Carlos Pace | 6 April | (Brazil) Felipe Guimarães | (Brazil) Felipe Guimarães | (Brazil) Felipe Guimarães | (United Kingdom) Hitech Racing | (Argentina) Bruno Etman |
| 1 | R2 | (Brazil) Autódromo José Carlos Pace | 7 April | | (Brazil) Felipe Guimarães | (Brazil) Felipe Guimarães | (United Kingdom) Hitech Racing | (Argentina) Bruno Etman |
| 2 | R1 | (Brazil) Autódromo Internacional Nelson Piquet | 20 April | (Brazil) Felipe Guimarães | (Brazil) Felipe Guimarães | (Brazil) Felipe Guimarães | (United Kingdom) Hitech Racing | (Argentina) Bruno Etman |
| 2 | R2 | (Brazil) Autódromo Internacional Nelson Piquet | 21 April | | (Brazil) Felipe Guimarães | (Brazil) Gustavo Lima | (Brazil) Césario F3 | (Brazil) Artur Fortunato |
| 3 | R1 | (Argentina) Autódromo Ciudad de Concordia | 29 June | (Brazil) Felipe Guimarães | (Brazil) Felipe Guimarães | (Brazil) Felipe Guimarães | (United Kingdom) Hitech Racing | (Argentina) Federico Moises |
| 3 | R2 | (Argentina) Autódromo Ciudad de Concordia | 30 June | | (Brazil) Felipe Guimarães | (Brazil) Felipe Guimarães | (United Kingdom) Hitech Racing | (Argentina) Federico Moises |
| 4 | R1 | (Brazil) Autódromo José Carlos Pace | 20 July | (Brazil) Felipe Guimarães | (Argentina) Bruno Etman | (Brazil) Raphael Raucci | (Brazil) RR Racing | (Argentina) Federico Moises |
| 4 | R2 | (Brazil) Autódromo José Carlos Pace | 21 July | | (Brazil) Felipe Guimarães | (Brazil) Felipe Guimarães | (United Kingdom) Hitech Racing | (Argentina) Bruno Etman |
| 5 | R1 | (Brazil) Autódromo Internacional de Curitiba | 24 August | (Argentina) Bruno Etman | (Brazil) Raphael Raucci | (Argentina) Bruno Etman | (Brazil) Césario F3 | (Argentina) Bruno Etman |
| 5 | R2 | (Brazil) Autódromo Internacional de Curitiba | 25 August | | (Brazil) Felipe Guimarães | (Brazil) Felipe Guimarães | (United Kingdom) Hitech Racing | (Brazil) Artur Fortunato |
| 6 | R1 | (Brazil) Autódromo Internacional Nelson Piquet | 28 September | (Brazil) Felipe Guimarães | (Brazil) Felipe Guimarães | (Brazil) Felipe Guimarães | (United Kingdom) Hitech Racing | (Argentina) Bruno Etman |
| 6 | R2 | (Brazil) Autódromo Internacional Nelson Piquet | 29 September | | (Brazil) Artur Fortunato | (Brazil) Felipe Guimarães | (United Kingdom) Hitech Racing | (Argentina) Bruno Etman |
| 7 | R1 | (Brazil) Autódromo Internacional de Tarumã | 26 October | (Argentina) Bruno Etman | (Brazil) Felipe Guimarães | (Brazil) Felipe Guimarães | (United Kingdom) Hitech Racing | (Brazil) Artur Fortunato |
| 7 | R2 | (Brazil) Autódromo Internacional de Tarumã | 26 October | | (Brazil) Felipe Guimarães | (Brazil) Felipe Guimarães | (United Kingdom) Hitech Racing | (Argentina) Bruno Etman |
| 8 | R1 | (Brazil) Autódromo Internacional de Cascavel | 16 November | (Brazil) Felipe Guimarães | (Brazil) Leonardo de Souza | (Brazil) Felipe Guimarães | (United Kingdom) Hitech Racing | (Argentina) Bruno Etman |
| 8 | R2 | (Brazil) Autódromo Internacional de Cascavel | 17 November | | (Brazil) Leonardo de Souza | (Brazil) Leonardo de Souza | (Brazil) Kemba Racing | (Brazil) Ricardo Landucci |
| 9 | R1 | (Brazil) Autódromo Internacional de Curitiba | 30 November | (Brazil) Leonardo de Souza | (Brazil) Felipe Guimarães | (Brazil) Felipe Guimarães | (United Kingdom) Hitech Racing | (Brazil) Artur Fortunato |
| 9 | R2 | (Brazil) Autódromo Internacional de Curitiba | 1 December | | (Brazil) Felipe Guimarães | (Brazil) Leonardo de Souza | (Brazil) Kemba Racing | (Argentina) Bruno Etman |

== Championship standings ==
| Pos. | Driver | INT (Brazil) | | BRA (Brazil) | | ACC (Argentina) | | INT (Brazil) | | CUR (Brazil) | | BRA (Brazil) | | TAR (Brazil) | | CAS (Brazil) | | CUR (Brazil) | | Points |
Class A
| 1 | (Brazil) Felipe Guimarães | **1** | 1 | **1** | Ret | **1** | 1 | **Ret** | 1 | Ret | 1 | **1** | 1 | **1** | 1 | **1** | 2 | 1 | 6 | 285 |
| 2 | (Brazil) Raphael Raucci | 2 | 3 | 3 | 2 | 3 | 4 | 1 | 3 | **2** | 2 | Ret | 4 | 4 | Ret | 5 | Ret | Ret | 2 | 211 |
| 3 | (Brazil) Gustavo Myasava | 9 | 5 | Ret | Ret | 4 | 3 | Ret | Ret | 4 | 6 | 5 | 5 | 2 | 2 | Ret | 4 | Ret | 4 | 150 |
| 4 | (Brazil) Leonardo de Souza | | | | | | | | | 7 | 7 | 4 | 6 | | | 2 | 1 | **2** | 1 | 115 |
| 5 | (Brazil) Higor Hoffmann | 6 | 4 | Ret | 4 | | | | | 5 | Ret | | | | | | | | | 46 |
| 6 | (Brazil) Gustavo Frigotto | 5 | 9 | 6 | Ret | | | | | | | | | | | | | | | 32 |
| 7 | (Brazil) Gustavo Lima | | | Ret | 1 | | | | | | | | | | | | | | | 20 |
| 8 | (Brazil) Ayman Darwich | | | | | | | NC | 7 | | | | | | | | | | | 12 |
| 9 | (Brazil) Rodrigo Gonzalez | | | | | | | | | | | | | 5 | Ret | | | | | 10 |
Class B
| 1 | (Argentina) Bruno Etman | **3** | 2 | **2** | 5 | **6** | 6 | **6** | 2 | **1** | 5 | **2** | 2 | **Ret** | **3** | 3 | 5 | 4 | 3 | 277 |
| 2 | (Brazil) Artur Fortunato | 7 | 6 | Ret | 3 | 5 | 5 | 5 | Ret | 3 | 3 | 3 | 3 | 3 | 4 | **4** | 6 | **3** | Ret | 234 |
| 3 | (Argentina) Federico Moises | | | | | 2 | 2 | 2 | 4 | | | | | | | | | | | 75 |
| 4 | (Brazil) Elias Azevedo | 8 | 7 | 5 | 6 | | | | | 6 | 4 | | | | | | | | | 73 |
| 5 | (Brazil) Ricardo Landucci | | | | | | | | | | | | | | | Ret | 3 | 5 | Ret | 32 |
| 6 | (Brazil) Emilio Padron | | | | | | | 3 | 6 | 9 | Ret | | | | | | | | | 31 |
| 7 | (Brazil) Eduardo Banzoli | 4 | Ret | | | | | 4 | Ret | | | | | | | | | | | 27 |
| 8 | (Brazil) Gaetano Di Mauro | Ret | Ret | 4 | 7 | | | | | | | | | | | | | | | 25 |
| 9 | (United States) Nicholas Silva | Ret | 8 | | | | | Ret | 5 | | | | | | | | | | | 22 |
| 10 | (Brazil) Pedro Serrano | | | | | | | | | 8 | 8 | | | | | | | | | 20 |
| 11 | (Brazil) Lukas Moraes | | | | | | | | | | | | | | | | | Ret | 5 | 15 |
| 12 | (Brazil) Rodolfo Toni | Ret | 10 | | | | | | | | | | | | | | | | | 8 |
| | (Brazil) Alexandre Doretto | NC | Ret | | | | | | | | | | | | | | | | | 0 |
| | (Brazil) Victor Miranda | | | | | | | | | | | | | | | | | Ret | Ret | 0 |
| | (Brazil) Lucilio Baumer | | | | | | | | | Ret | DNS | | | | | | | | | 0 |
| Pos. | Driver | INT (Brazil) | | BRA (Brazil) | | ACC (Argentina) | | INT (Brazil) | | CUR (Brazil) | | BRA (Brazil) | | TAR (Brazil) | | CAS (Brazil) | | CUR (Brazil) | | Points |

| Colour | Result |
|---|---|
| Gold | Winner |
| Silver | Second place |
| Bronze | Third place |
| Green | Points classification |
| Blue | Non-points classification |
| Blue | Non-classified finish (NC) |
| Purple | Retired, not classified (Ret) |
| Red | Did not qualify (DNQ) |
| Red | Did not pre-qualify (DNPQ) |
| Black | Disqualified (DSQ) |
| White | Did not start (DNS) |
| White | Withdrew (WD) |
| White | Race cancelled (C) |
| Blank | Did not practice (DNP) |
| Blank | Did not arrive (DNA) |
| Blank | Excluded (EX) |

**Bold** – Pole
Italics – Fastest Lap
