= Felipe Guimarães =

Brazilian racing driver

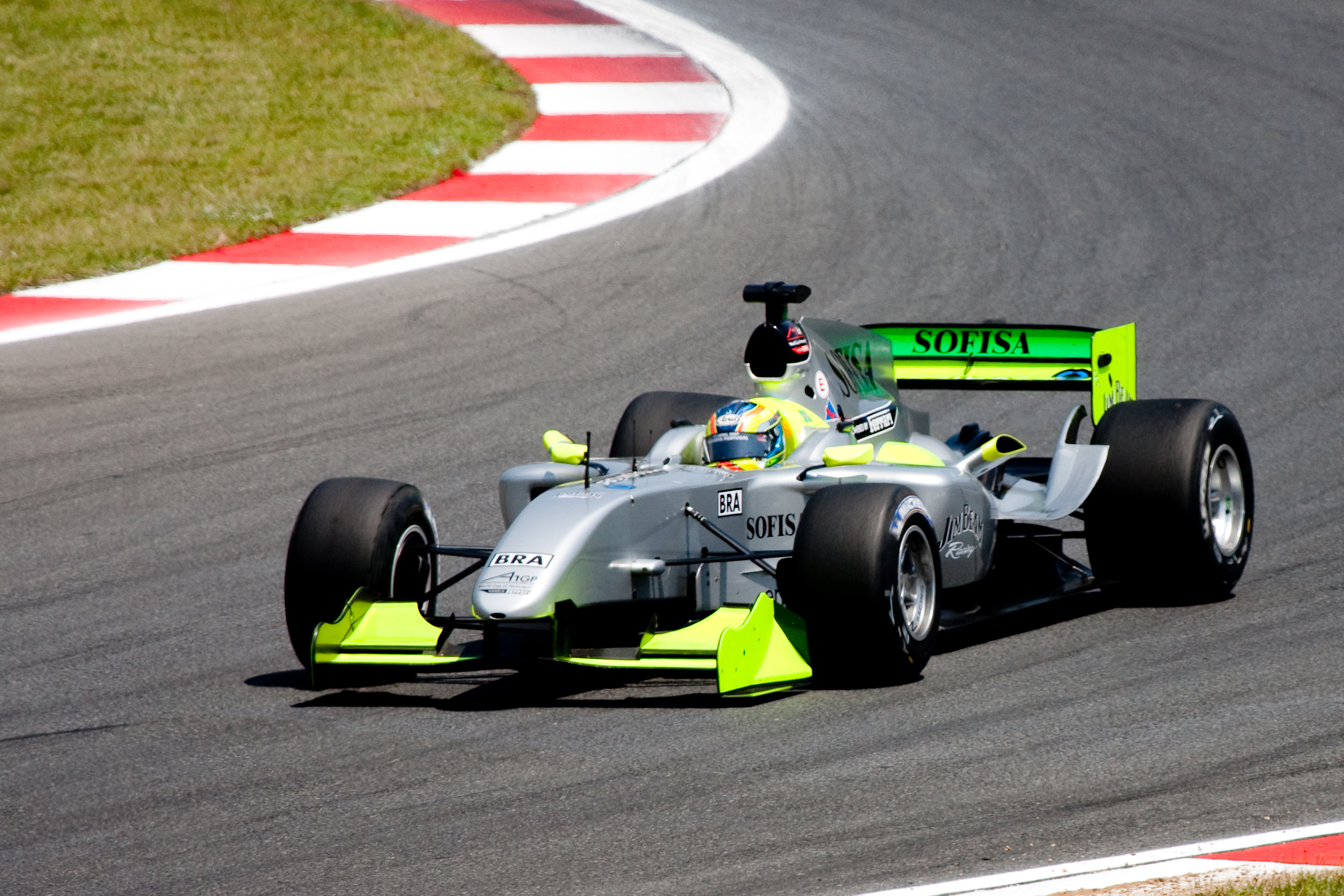
- Guimarães competing for A1 Team Brazil at the 2008–09 A1 Grand Prix of Nations, South Africa
- Born: Felipe Lopes Guimarães; March 22, 1991 (age 35) Anápolis, Brazil

FIA European F3 Championship career
- Debut season: 2014
- Current team: Double R Racing
- Starts: 18
- Wins: 0
- Poles: 0
- Fastest laps: 0

Previous series
- 2013 2011-2013 2010 2009 2008–09 2008 2008 2007: British Formula 3 Formula 3 Sudamericana; GP3 Series; Firestone Indy Lights; A1 Grand Prix; Euroseries 3000; Italian Formula 3000; Formula Three Sudamericana

Championship titles
- 2013: Formula 3 Sudamericana

Felipe Lopes Guimarães (born March 22, 1991) is a Brazilian racing driver.

After a childhood in karting, Guimarães transitioned to the extremely competitive Formula Three Sudamericana series at the age of sixteen and finished fourth in points with two victories. 2008 took him to Europe where he competed in Euroseries 3000 where he finished ninth in points. He then competed in eleven rounds of the 2008-09 A1 Grand Prix season for A1 Team Brazil where his best finish was second place in the feature race at Kyalami. He signed on with Bryan Herta Autosport to make his Firestone Indy Lights debut at Watkins Glen International in July 2009. He finished on the podium in third place in his first Indy Lights start. He made two more Indy Lights starts and finished in second at Infineon Raceway.

== Racing record ==
=== Career summary ===
Season	Series	Team	Races	Wins	Poles	F/Laps	Podiums	Points	Position
2007	Formula 3 Sudamericana	Amir Nasr Racing	16	2	1	4	6	54	4th
2008	Euroseries 3000	TP Formula	6	0	1	1	1	16	9th
2008	Italian Formula 3000	TP Formula	4	0	1	1	1	16	8th
2008–09	A1 Grand Prix	A1 Team Brazil	14	0	0	0	1	18	15th
2009	Indy Lights	Bryan Herta Autosport	3	0	0	0	2	107	23rd
2010	GP3 Series	Addax Team	16	0	0	0	1	9	16th
2011	Formula 3 Sudamericana	Cesário Fórmula	1	0	0	0	0	12	10th
2012	Formula 3 Sudamericana	Hitech Racing Brazil	6	4	2	3	4	80	4th
2013	Formula 3 Brazil Open	Hitech Racing	1	1	1	1	1	N/A	**1st**
2013	Formula 3 Sudamericana	Hitech Racing	16	12	6	11	13	255	**1st**
2013	British Formula 3 Championship	Fortec Motorsports	12	2	0	1	4	109	4th
2014	Formula 3 Brazil Open	Hitech Racing	1	1	1	1	1	N/A	**1st**
2014	FIA European Formula 3 Championship	Double R Racing	18	0	0	0	0	5	22nd

=== Complete A1 Grand Prix results ===
(key) (Races in bold indicate pole position) (Races in italics indicate fastest lap)

Year	Entrant	1	2	3	4	5	6	7	8	9	10	11	12	13	14	DC	Points
2008–09	Brazil	NED; SPR; 14	NED; FEA; Ret	CHN; SPR; 20	CHN; FEA; Ret	MYS; SPR; Ret	MYS; FEA; 7	NZL; SPR; 14	NZL; FEA; 15	RSA; SPR; 15	RSA; FEA; 2	POR; SPR; 7	POR; FEA; DNS	GBR; SPR; DNS	GBR; SPR; DNS	15th	18

=== American open–wheel racing results ===
(key)

==== Indy Lights Series ====
Year	Team	1	2	3	4	5	6	7	8	9	10	11	12	13	14	15	Rank	Points
2009	Bryan Herta Autosport	STP	STP	LBH	KAN	INDY	MIL	IOW	WGL; 3	TOR	EDM	KTY	MOH; 4	SNM; 2	CHI	HMS	23rd	107

=== Complete GP3 Series results ===
(key) (Races in bold indicate pole position) (Races in italics indicate fastest lap)

Year	Entrant	1	2	3	4	5	6	7	8	9	10	11	12	13	14	15	16	DC	Points
2010	Addax Team	CAT; FEA; Ret	CAT; SPR; 20	IST; FEA; 3	IST; SPR; 6	VAL; FEA; Ret	VAL; SPR; 18	SIL; FEA; Ret	SIL; SPR; 23	HOC; FEA; 7	HOC; SPR; 7	HUN; FEA; 13	HUN; SPR; Ret	SPA; FEA; Ret	SPA; SPR; 9	MNZ; FEA; Ret	MNZ; SPR; 17	16th	9

=== Complete FIA European Formula 3 Championship results ===
(key)

Year	Entrant	Engine	1	2	3	4	5	6	7	8	9	10	11	12	13	14	15	16	17	18	19	20	21	22	23	24	25	26	27	28	29	30	31	32	33	DC	Points
2014	Double R Racing	Mercedes	SIL; 1; 10	SIL; 2; 11	SIL; 3 Ret	HOC; 1; 12	HOC; 2; 14	HOC; 3 Ret	PAU; 1; 16	PAU; 2; 15	PAU; 3; 12	HUN; 1; 13	HUN; 2; 13	HUN; 3; 20	SPA; 1; 8	SPA; 2 Ret	SPA; 3 Ret	NOR; 1 Ret	NOR; 2 Ret	NOR; 3 Ret	MSC; 1	MSC; 2	MSC; 3	RBR; 1	RBR; 2	RBR; 3	NÜR; 1	NÜR; 2	NÜR; 3	IMO; 1	IMO; 2	IMO; 3	HOC; 1	HOC; 2	HOC; 3	22nd	5

=== Complete Stock Car Brasil results ===
(key) (Races in bold indicate pole position) (Races in italics indicate fastest lap)

Year	Team	Car	1	2	3	4	5	6	7	8	9	10	11	12	13	14	15	16	17	18	19	20	21	Rank	Points
2015	Boettger Competições	Peugeot 408	GOI; 1	RBP; 1	RBP; 2	VEL; 1	VEL; 2	CUR; 1	CUR; 2	SCZ; 1	SCZ; 2	CUR; 1	CUR; 2	GOI; 1	CAS; 1	CAS; 2	MOU; 1	MOU; 2	CUR; 1; 19	CUR; 2; 15	TAR; 1 Ret	TAR; 2 Ret	INT; 1; 15	30th	14

Sporting positions
Preceded by Fernando Resende	Formula 3 Sudamericana; Champion; 2013	Succeeded by None (Series ended)
Preceded by Lucas Foresti	Formula 3 Brazil Open; Winner; 2013, 2014	Succeeded by None (Series ended)
