= Hitech Grand Prix =

British auto racing team

(United Kingdom) Hitech Grand Prix
- Founded: 2002 (as Hitech Racing); 2015 (as Hitech Grand Prix)
- Base: Silverstone, United Kingdom
- Team principal(s): Oliver Oakes
- Founder(s): Dennis Rushen; David Hayle
- Current series: FIA Formula 2 Championship; FIA Formula 3 Championship; GB3 Championship; F4 British Championship; Formula Winter Series; F1 Academy
- Former series: British Formula 3 Championship; GP2 Series; Formula 3 Sudamericana; Brazilian Formula Three Championship; Stock Car Light; FIA Formula 3 European Championship; Formula Regional Middle East Championship; Formula 3 Euro Series; W Series; Formula 4 UAE Championship
- Current drivers: Formula 2; 3. (Japan) Ritomo Miyata; 4. (United States) Colton Herta; Formula 3; 23. (South Korea) Michael Shin; 24. (Republic of Ireland) Fionn McLaughlin; 25. (Japan) Jin Nakamura; GB3 Championship; 4. (Japan) Jin Nakamura (part-time); 6. (China) Yuhao Fu; 7. (United Kingdom) Deagen Fairclough; F4 British Championship; 3. (United Arab Emirates) Adam Al Azhari; 5. (Sweden) Scott Kin Lindblom; 6. (Switzerland) Chiara Bättig; 7. (United Arab Emirates) Theo Palmer; F1 Academy; 55. (United States) Ava Dobson; 56. (United Kingdom) Rachel Robertson
- Teams' Championships: Formula 3 Sudamericana: 2013; F3 Asian Championship: 2018, 2019; F3 Asian Winter Series: 2019; F4 British Championship: 2024
- Drivers' Championships: British Formula 3: 2007: Marko Asmer; Formula 3 Sudamericana: 2013: Felipe Guimarães; F3 Asian Championship: 2018: Raoul Hyman; 2019: Ukyo Sasahara; F3 Asian Winter series: 2019: Rinus van Kalmthout; F4 British Championship: 2022: Alex Dunne; 2024: Deagen Fairclough
- Website: http://www.hitechgp.co.uk

Hitech Grand Prix (formerly Hitech Racing) is a British motor racing team. It was founded by Dennis Rushen and David Hayle in 2002 and relaunched by Oliver Oakes in 2015. Currently, Hitech competes in FIA Formula 2, FIA Formula 3, Formula Regional Oceania Trophy, Eurocup-3, GB3 Championship, British F4, F1 Academy, Formula Trophy UAE and UAE4 Series. The team also supports Toyota drivers in Super Formula Championship.

== History ==
=== Hitech Racing (2002–2014) ===
Hitech Racing started out in the British Formula 3 Championship in 2003. The team also competed in the South American Formula Three Series, namely the Formula 3 Sudamericana.

In its first season, Hitech scored five pole positions and six podium finishes, with drivers Danny Watts and Eric Salignon. Andrew Thompson also contributed some points finishes. Watts finished the British F3 Championship in 5th place in a season that included a memorable win at Castle Combe. In the Korea Super Prix, guest driver Richard Antinucci achieved Hitech's first international race win.

In the second season, 2004, Thompson was retained and joined by drivers Marko Asmer, James Walker, and Lucas Di Grassi. Di Grassi had two wins and was classified in eighth place overall. Another of that year's highlights was a podium finish on Di Grassi's début at the Macau Grand Prix. Asmer managed to finish the championship closing the top 10.

In 2005, Hitech retained Asmer and brought in Tim Bridgman from Formula BMW. Asmer was the best of the duo, scoring no less than five second places, but missing out on an actual win, even so managing to snatch the fourth place in the championship.

For 2006, Hitech brought back James Walker, alongside James Jakes and Salvador Durán, with Jakes finishing 8th, Walker 9th and Durán 10th in a poor season that only heralded one podium finish (achieved by Walker).

In 2007 Hitech retained the services of Marko Asmer who joined Austrian Walter Grubmuller for an assault on the British F3 Championship. Hitech and Asmer took the title, scoring 11 poles, 11 wins (from 22 races) and 9 fastest laps. Marko Asmer secured the title long before the final round and in the end by a margin of 85 points from Maro Engel.

In 2008, Walter Grubmuller was joined by the youngest driver in the sport, Max Chilton.

For 2012, Brazilian Felipe Guimarães took 4 wins and two poles to end fourth with Hitech Racing Brazil in the Formula Three Sudamericana series.

In 2013, Hitech's Brazilian ace Felipe Guimarães took both the Formula 3 Brazil Open and the Formula Three Sudamericana series titles, winning 13 races and obtaining 7 poles and 12 fastest laps in the process.

In 2014, Brazilian Felipe Guimarães defended his Formula 3 Brazil Open title with Hitech Racing Brazil in January 2014 at the 2014 Formula 3 Brazil Open with his teammate Victor Franzoni finishing second.

==== GP2 Series ====
In 2005, Hitech partnered with Piquet Sports to enter the GP2 Series, running Nelson Piquet Jr. and Alexandre Negrao. However, prior to the Istanbul round, it was announced that this partnership had ended and that Piquet Sports would run the team for the remainder of the season. Despite this, team would continue carrying the Hitech name until the end of the season

=== Hitech GP (2015–present) ===
Old Hitech logo

In 2015, Oliver Oakes founded Hitech GP, and the team made guest appearances in the two final rounds of the European Formula 3 Championship with Alex Sims.

In 2016, Hitech joined forces with ART Grand Prix, to make a full season in the FIA F3 European Championship. George Russell and rookies Ben Barnicoat and Nikita Mazepin will race for the team. 2015's guest driver Sims again appeared in the 2016 season's final round at Hockenheim.

The following season, only Mazepin remained with the team, he was joined by 2016 Prema driver Ralf Aron, Jake Hughes and Honda Junior Tadasuke Makino.

For 2018 the team signed Enaam Ahmed, Ben Hingeley, Álex Palou

In 2019 the team was represented by Jüri Vips in the new FIA Formula 3 Championship. He was joined by Leonardo Pulcini, who raced in the GP3 Series, and 2016 French F4 champion Yifei Ye. The team saw four wins coming from Vips and Pulcini that ultimately resulted in the outfit finishing second behind Prema Racing in the teams' standings.

In 2019, Hitech GP provided a full race operation package to W Series, including preparation, shipping and all trackside requirements. Hitech GP also supplied race engineers and pit crew for each of the cars. This partnership was discontinued for the 2021 season following the 2020 season's cancellation due to the COVID-19 pandemic and Hitech GP's subsequent expansion into other series.

For the inaugural 2019 FIA Motorsport Games Formula 4 Cup all drivers utilized KCMG KC MG-01 cars, which were operated by Hitech GP. This was the first Formula 4 car to feature Halo safety device.

==== FIA Formula 2 Championship ====
In January 2020, Hitech announced it would expand into the championship for the 2020 season. In their first season, they finished fourth in the Teams' Championship, with drivers Nikita Mazepin and Luca Ghiotto earning three wins between them.

Ahead of the 2021 season, Ghiotto left the team and Mazepin moved to Formula One with Haas. In their place, the team signed Jüri Vips and promoted Liam Lawson from their Formula 3 operation. Lawson won the first race of the season and went on to finish ninth overall, with teammate Vips in sixth. Vips stayed on with the team for 2022, and Marcus Armstrong was signed to race alongside him. The team finished fifth in the championship.

Hitech signed a title sponsorship deal with Pulse-Eight but slumped to eighth place in the championship in 2023, with both Jak Crawford and Isack Hadjar finishing outside the top ten in the championship. The team renewed its lineup with Paul Aron and Amaury Cordeel ahead of the Dallara F2 2024's introduction in 2024, and recovered to fourth in the teams' standings. Hitech inked a partnership with Toyota Gazoo Racing (TGR) for 2025 and, despite hiring a pair of rookie drivers, enjoyed its best season to-date, finishing runner-up with Williams' Luke Browning and Ferrari's Dino Beganovic.

For 2026, nine-time IndyCar race winner Colton Herta made the move to the FIA's 'Road to F1' pathway with support from Cadillac, and joined Toyota junior Ritomo Miyata.

==== Formula One ====
It was reported in February 2023 that Hitech registered an interest in joining the Formula 1 at a date to be determined. In June 2023, Hitech announced that it has lodged an entry to join the 2026 season. Following announcements by the FIA on accepted submissions, Hitech was not one of the accepted applications, and speculation is that their application was rejected. There are some who believe that they are being funded secretly by Dmitry Mazepin, who is banned from competing in F1 due to European Union sanctions following the invasion of Ukraine in 2022. The allegation is that Vladimir Kim who has purchased a 25% stake in the Team is the face of the funding with the actual funding coming from Mazepin.

==== F1 Academy ====
In December 2024, F1 Academy announced that Hitech will join the championship in the 2025 season as the sixth team with two full-time competitors and the third seat reserved for the wild card drivers, relieving Prema Racing from this duty. In Round 3 at Silverstone in the 2026 season, Hitech claimed its first pole position and podium finish after Chiara Bättig, the wild card driver for the round, claimed pole position and finished the feature race in second place.

== Ownership ==
Hitech was originally founded in 2002 by Dennis Rushen and David Hayle as HiTech Racing Ltd. In 2015 Hayle, in partnership with Oliver Oakes, formed the company and its assets into a new company, Hitech Grand Prix Ltd, to compete in the FIA Formula 3 European Championship. In 2016, Hitech joined forces with ART Grand Prix to complete a full season in the FIA F3 European Championship. Gaining Nikita Mazepin as a driver, they also gained Russian minerals company Uralkali as a sponsor, and partial ownership by Dmitry Mazepin. Over the next few years, Mazepin increased his holding through Cyprus-based investment company Bergton Management Ltd to 75%.

In March 2022, following the Russian war against Ukraine, the shares held by Bergton Management Ltd were relinquished to Oakes, who took full control of the company. Oakes had formed a new company, Hitech Global Holdings Ltd, on 11 March 2022 to take control of the shares. This company was formed just three days after Mazepin and his son were sanctioned by both the UK Government and the European Union, resulting in questions being asked in the UK Parliament over the effect of sanctions against Russia. In May 2025, Oakes' brother William, a director at Hitech, was arrested near Silverstone Park charged with "transferring criminal property" and being found with "a large amount of cash". William resigned from his position shortly after and, in October 2025, Oliver Oakes transferred his voting and sharing powers to Chinese investor Guocai Liu.

== Current series results ==
=== FIA Formula 2 Championship ===
Year	Chassis	Engine	Tyres	Drivers	Races	Wins	Poles	F. Laps	Podiums	D.C.	Pts	T.C.	Pts
2020	Dallara; F2 2018	Mecachrome; V634T V6 t	P	(Russia) Nikita Mazepin	24	2	0	2	6	5th	164	4th	270
2020	Dallara; F2 2018	Mecachrome; V634T V6 t	P	(Italy) Luca Ghiotto	23	1	0	2	4	10th	106	4th	270
2021	Dallara; F2 2018	Mecachrome; V634T V6 t	P	(New Zealand) Liam Lawson	23	1	1	2	3	9th	103	4th	223
2021	Dallara; F2 2018	Mecachrome; V634T V6 t	P	(Estonia) Jüri Vips	23	2	0	1	6	6th	120	4th	223
2022	Dallara; F2 2018	Mecachrome; V634T V6 t	P	(New Zealand) Marcus Armstrong	28	3	0	0	4	13th	93	5th	207
2022	Dallara; F2 2018	Mecachrome; V634T V6 t	P	(Estonia) Jüri Vips	28	1	2	4	5	11th	114	5th	207
2023	Dallara; F2 2018	Mecachrome; V634T V6 t	P	(United States) Jak Crawford	26	1	1	0	5	13th	57	8th	112
2023	Dallara; F2 2018	Mecachrome; V634T V6 t	P	(France) Isack Hadjar	26	1	0	1	2	14th	55	8th	112
2024	Dallara; F2 2024	Mecachrome; V634T V6 t	P	(Belgium) Amaury Cordeel	28	0	0	0	0	17th	39	4th	202
2024	Dallara; F2 2024	Mecachrome; V634T V6 t	P	(Estonia) Paul Aron	28	1	4	2	8	**3rd**	**163**	4th	202
2025	Dallara; F2 2024	Mecachrome; V634T V6 t	P	(United Kingdom) Luke Browning	27	1	1	3	9	4th	162	2nd	278
2025	Dallara; F2 2024	Mecachrome; V634T V6 t	P	(Sweden) Dino Beganovic	27	1	1	5	4	7th	116	2nd	278
2026	Dallara; F2 2024	Mecachrome; V634T V6 t	P	(Japan) Ritomo Miyata	25	1	0	0	2	12th	70	8th	96*
2026	Dallara; F2 2024	Mecachrome; V634T V6 t	P	(United States) Colton Herta	23	0	0	0	0	19th	26	8th	96*

* Season still in progress.

==== In detail ====
(key)

Year	Drivers	1	2	3	4	5	6	7	8	9	10	11	12	13	14	15	16	17	18	19	20	21	22	23	24	25	26	27	28	29	T.C.	Points
2020		RBR; FEA	RBR; SPR	RBR; FEA	RBR; SPR	HUN; FEA	HUN; SPR	SIL; FEA	SIL; SPR	SIL; FEA	SIL; SPR	CAT; FEA	CAT; SPR	SPA; FEA	SPA; SPR	MNZ; FEA	MNZ; SPR	MUG; FEA	MUG; SPR	SOC; FEA	SOC; SPR	BHR; FEA	BHR; SPR	BHR; FEA	BHR; SPR						4th	270
2020	(Russia) Nikita Mazepin	14	10	14	8	2^{F}	5	1	5	4	8	13	6	2	4	NC	8	1	18	7	2^{F}	5	2	9	9						4th	270
2020	(Italy) Luca Ghiotto	DNS	Ret	11	10	4	1	17	19†	13	10	8	2	9	5	2^{F}	15	2	Ret	4	5	12^{F}	Ret	16	7						4th	270
2021		BHR; SP1	BHR; SP2	BHR; FEA	MON; SP1	MON; SP2	MON; FEA	BAK; SP1	BAK; SP2	BAK; FEA	SIL; SP1	SIL; SP2	SIL; FEA	MNZ; SP1	MNZ; SP2	MNZ; FEA	SOC; SP1	SOC; SP2	SOC; FEA	JED; SP1	JED; SP2	JED; FEA	YMC; SP1	YMC; SP2	YMC; FEA						4th	223
2021	(New Zealand) Liam Lawson	1	Ret	3	9	DSQ	7	Ret	7	6^{P}	7	5	11	5	4	Ret^{F}	Ret	C	7^{F}	2	Ret	9	5	6	Ret						4th	223
2021	(Estonia) Jüri Vips	10	16	13	5^{F}	3	8	8	1	1	2	6	7	8	6	Ret	2	C	Ret	3	Ret	6	12	Ret	8						4th	223
2022		BHR; SPR	BHR; FEA	JED; SPR	JED; FEA	IMO; SPR	IMO; FEA	CAT; SPR	CAT; FEA	MON; SPR	MON; FEA	BAK; SPR	BAK; FEA	SIL; SPR	SIL; FEA	RBR; SPR	RBR; FEA	LEC; SPR	LEC; FEA	HUN; SPR	HUN; FEA	SPA; SPR	SPA; FEA	ZAN; SPR	ZAN; FEA	MNZ; SPR	MNZ; FEA	YMC; SPR	YMC; FEA		5th	207
2022	(New Zealand) Marcus Armstrong	Ret	5	Ret	5	1	16	10	7	3	6	4	12	9	8	1	Ret	14	Ret	7	6	7	13	1	14	10	12	10	9		5th	207
2022	(Estonia) Jüri Vips	7	3^{F}	2^{F}	10	15^{F}	Ret^{P}	Ret	17	5	3	12	Ret^{P F}	12	6	5	8	11	12	2	5	14	8	5	7	1	10	12	8		5th	207
2023		BHR; SPR	BHR; FEA	JED; SPR	JED; FEA	ALB; SPR	ALB; FEA	BAK; SPR	BAK; FEA	MON; SPR	MON; FEA	CAT; SPR	CAT; FEA	RBR; SPR	RBR; FEA	SIL; SPR	SIL; FEA	HUN; SPR	HUN; FEA	SPA; SPR	SPA; FEA	ZAN; SPR	ZAN; FEA	MNZ; SPR	MNZ; FEA	YMC; SPR	YMC; FEA				8th	112
2023	(United States) Jak Crawford	14	12	9	15	2	Ret	3	9	3	9	Ret	13	1	8	14	10	14	17	14	Ret	Ret	3^{P}	13	16†	12	10				8th	112
2023	(France) Isack Hadjar	20	7	12	9	6	15	11	7^{F}	Ret	12	12	20	3	12	5	15	8	5	11	Ret	1	6	11	11	5	8				8th	112
2024		BHR; SPR	BHR; FEA	JED; SPR	JED; FEA	ALB; SPR	ALB; FEA	IMO; SPR	IMO; FEA	MCO; SPR	MCO; FEA	CAT; SPR	CAT; FEA	RBR; SPR	RBR; FEA	SIL; SPR	SIL; FEA	HUN; SPR	HUN; FEA	SPA; SPR	SPA; FEA	MNZ; SPR	MNZ; FEA	BAK; SPR	BAK; FEA	LUS; SPR	LUS; FEA	YMC; SPR	YMC; FEA		4th	202
2024	(Belgium) Amaury Cordeel	Ret	Ret	Ret	5	16	11	4	Ret	14	Ret	14	8	18	7	15	15	20	Ret	11	8	12	18	18	12	16	7	13	8		4th	202
2024	(Estonia) Paul Aron	5	3	2^{F}	10	18	2	2	6	7	3	3	4^{P}	3	5	Ret	12	6	Ret^{P}	18	16†^{P F}	20	Ret	6	6	7	1^{P}	DSQ	11		4th	202
2025		ALB; SPR	ALB; FEA	BHR; SPR	BHR; FEA	JED; SPR	JED; FEA	IMO; SPR	IMO; FEA	MCO; SPR	MCO; FEA	CAT; SPR	CAT; FEA	RBR; SPR	RBR; FEA	SIL; SPR	SIL; FEA	SPA; SPR	SPA; FEA	HUN; SPR	HUN; FEA	MNZ; SPR	MNZ; FEA	BAK; SPR	BAK; FEA	LUS; SPR	LUS; FEA	YMC; SPR	YMC; FEA		2nd	278
2025	(United Kingdom) Luke Browning	3	C	10	2^{F}	9	6	3^{F}	2	3	4	6	20	Ret	5	12	3	Ret	3	12	4	8	1^{P}	2	19	17	10	20^{F}	14		2nd	278
2025	(Sweden) Dino Beganovic	14	C	3	7	15	13	12	3^{P}	15	Ret^{F}	15	15	Ret	9	18	4	16	7^{F}	8	7^{F}	6	6	1^{F}	3	9	9^{F}	4	4		2nd	278
2026		ALB; SPR	ALB; FEA	MIA; SPR	MIA; FEA	MTL; SPR	MTL; FEA	MCO; SPR	MCO; FEA	CAT; SPR	CAT; FEA	RBR; SPR	RBR; FEA	SIL; SPR	SIL; FEA	SPA; SPR	SPA; FEA	HUN; SPR	HUN; FEA	MNZ; SPR	MNZ; FEA	MAD; SPR	MAD; FEA	BAK; SPR	BAK; FE1	BAK; FE2	LUS; SPR	LUS; FEA	YAS; SPR	YAS; FEA	8th	96*
2026	(Japan) Ritomo Miyata	5	5	12	6	11	16†	11	6	14	18	17	15	11	14	17	8	13	13	9	5	1	3	19†	Ret	Ret					8th	96*
2026	(United States) Colton Herta	16	7	15	8	9	7	15	19	5	15	Ret	18	15	16	13	7	14	19	15	Ret	WD	WD	9	13	15					8th	96*

* Season still in progress.

=== FIA Formula 3 Championship ===
Year	Chassis	Engine	Tyres	Drivers	Races	Wins	Poles	F. Laps	Podiums	D.C.	Pts	T.C.	Pts
2019	Dallara; F3 2019	Mecachrome; V634 V6	P	(Italy) Leonardo Pulcini	16	1	0	0	2	8th	78	2nd	223
2019	Dallara; F3 2019	Mecachrome; V634 V6	P	(Estonia) Jüri Vips	16	3	1	2	4	4th	141	2nd	223
2019	Dallara; F3 2019	Mecachrome; V634 V6	P	(China) Yifei Ye	16	0	0	0	0	21st	4	2nd	223
2020	Dallara; F3 2019	Mecachrome; V634 V6	P	(United Kingdom) Max Fewtrell	12	0	0	0	0	20th	5	4th	167
2020	Dallara; F3 2019	Mecachrome; V634 V6	P	(France) Pierre-Louis Chovet	4	0	0	0	0	19th	5	4th	167
2020	Dallara; F3 2019	Mecachrome; V634 V6	P	(New Zealand) Liam Lawson	18	3	1	1	6	5th	143	4th	167
2020	Dallara; F3 2019	Mecachrome; V634 V6	P	(Norway) Dennis Hauger	18	0	0	1	1	17th	14	4th	167
2021	Dallara; F3 2019	Mecachrome; V634 V6	P	(United States) Jak Crawford	20	0	0	0	1	13th	45	6th	126
2021	Dallara; F3 2019	Mecachrome; V634 V6	P	(Japan) Ayumu Iwasa	20	1	0	0	2	12th	52	6th	126
2021	Dallara; F3 2019	Mecachrome; V634 V6	P	(Czech Republic) Roman Staněk	20	0	0	0	2	16th	29	6th	126
2022	Dallara; F3 2019	Mecachrome; V634 V6	P	(United States) Kaylen Frederick	18	0	0	0	0	17th	27	5th	150
2022	Dallara; F3 2019	Mecachrome; V634 V6	P	(France) Isack Hadjar	18	3	1	2	5	4th	123	5th	150
2022	Dallara; F3 2019	Mecachrome; V634 V6	P	(Malaysia) Nazim Azman	18	0	0	0	0	32nd	0	5th	150
2023	Dallara; F3 2019	Mecachrome; V634 V6	P	(Colombia) Sebastián Montoya	18	0	0	0	1	16th	37	5th	170
2023	Dallara; F3 2019	Mecachrome; V634 V6	P	(Italy) Gabriele Minì	17	2	2	1	4	7th	92	5th	170
2023	Dallara; F3 2019	Mecachrome; V634 V6	P	(United Kingdom) Luke Browning	18	0	0	1	1	15th	41	5th	170
2024	Dallara; F3 2019	Mecachrome; V634 V6	P	(United Kingdom) Luke Browning	20	2	2	2	3	**3rd**	**128**	5th	166
2024	Dallara; F3 2019	Mecachrome; V634 V6	P	(Norway) Martinius Stenshorne	18	1	0	2	2	18th	38	5th	166
2024	Dallara; F3 2019	Mecachrome; V634 V6	P	(Australia) James Wharton	2	0	0	0	0	33rd	0	5th	166
2024	Dallara; F3 2019	Mecachrome; V634 V6	P	(United Kingdom) Cian Shields	20	0	0	0	0	30th	0	5th	166
2025	Dallara; F3 2025	Mecachrome; V634 V6	P	(Norway) Martinius Stenshorne	19	2	0	3	5	5th	89	8th	90
2025	Dallara; F3 2025	Mecachrome; V634 V6	P	(Austria) Joshua Dufek	8	0	0	0	0	30th	0	8th	90
2025	Dallara; F3 2025	Mecachrome; V634 V6	P	(Mexico) Jesse Carrasquedo Jr.	4	0	0	0	0	31st	0	8th	90
2025	Dallara; F3 2025	Mecachrome; V634 V6	P	(United States) Nikita Johnson	6	0	0	0	0	32nd	0	8th	90
2025	Dallara; F3 2025	Mecachrome; V634 V6	P	(United Kingdom) Freddie Slater	1	0	0	0	0	27th	0 (Note: Points scored driving for Hitech Grand Prix. Slater scored 10 points driving for other teams.)	8th	90
2025	Dallara; F3 2025	Mecachrome; V634 V6	P	(China) Gerrard Xie	19	0	0	0	0	29th	1	8th	90
2026	Dallara; F3 2025	Mecachrome; V634 V6	P	(South Korea) Michael Shin	19	0	0	0	0	33rd	0	8th	55
2026	Dallara; F3 2025	Mecachrome; V634 V6	P	(Republic of Ireland) Fionn McLaughlin	19	0	0	0	0	27th	2	8th	55
2026	Dallara; F3 2025	Mecachrome; V634 V6	P	(Japan) Jin Nakamura	19	1	0	0	2	14th	53	8th	55

==== In detail ====
(key) (Races in bold indicate pole position) (Races in italics indicate fastest lap)

Year	Drivers	1	2	3	4	5	6	7	8	9	10	11	12	13	14	15	16	17	18	19	20	21	T.C.	Points
2019		CAT; FEA	CAT; SPR	LEC; FEA	LEC; SPR	RBR; FEA	RBR; SPR	SIL; FEA	SIL; SPR	HUN; FEA	HUN; SPR	SPA; FEA	SPA; SPR	MNZ; FEA	MNZ; SPR	SOC; FEA	SOC; SPR						2nd	223
2019	(Italy) Leonardo Pulcini	20	21	Ret	12	9	5	4	1	7	2	7	7	10	6	4	16						2nd	223
2019	(Estonia) Jüri Vips	6	2	4	17	1^{F}	6	1^{P}	15	4	4	5	21	Ret	11^{F}	8	1						2nd	223
2019	(China) Yifei Ye	22	Ret	13	22	20	Ret	12	11	18	22	15	10	Ret	19	13	6						2nd	223
2020		RBR; FEA	RBR; SPR	RBR; FEA	RBR; SPR	HUN; FEA	HUN; SPR	SIL; FEA	SIL; SPR	SIL; FEA	SIL; SPR	CAT; FEA	CAT; SPR	SPA; FEA	SPA; SPR	MNZ; FEA	MNZ; SPR	MUG; FEA	MUG; SPR				4th	167
2020	(United Kingdom) Max Fewtrell	12	10	14	7	11	11	Ret	20	16	12	17	Ret										4th	167
2020	(France) Pierre-Louis Chovet													22	Ret	19	6						4th	167
2020	(New Zealand) Liam Lawson	6	1	8	Ret	Ret	Ret	1	4	3^{F}	5	2	7	9	3	6^{P}	7	10	1				4th	167
2020	(Norway) Dennis Hauger	15	22	18	12	8	3	16	17	Ret	20	18	26^{F}	15	19	12	15	14	12				4th	167
2021		CAT; SP1	CAT; SP2	CAT; FEA	LEC; SP1	LEC; SP2	LEC; FEA	RBR; SP1	RBR; SP2	RBR; FEA	HUN; SP1	HUN; SP2	HUN; FEA	SPA; SP1	SPA; SP2	SPA; FEA	ZAN; SP1	ZAN; SP2	ZAN; FEA	SOC; SP1	SOC; SP2	SOC; FEA	6th	126
2021	(United States) Jak Crawford	13	9	18	11	14	10	8	Ret	26	26	21	15	2	12	12	4	8	7	11	C	5	6th	126
2021	(Japan) Ayumu Iwasa	14	7	15	8	9	7	DSQ	14	6	1	10	12	15	11	13	3	Ret	11	10	C	9	6th	126
2021	(Czech Republic) Roman Staněk	16	12	10	26	19	15	11	4	12	11	3	23	3	13	15	27	15	13	13	C	26	6th	126
2022		BHR; SPR	BHR; FEA	IMO; SPR	IMO; FEA	CAT; SPR	CAT; FEA	SIL; SPR	SIL; FEA	RBR; SPR	RBR; FEA	HUN; SPR	HUN; FEA	SPA; SPR	SPA; FEA	ZAN; SPR	ZAN; FEA	MNZ; SPR	MNZ; FEA				5th	150
2022	(United States) Kaylen Frederick	8	10	16	7	7	9	5	12	6	23	19	20	Ret	16	15	13	Ret	25				5th	150
2022	(France) Isack Hadjar	1	25	5	3	10	3	1^{F}	5	10	1^{P F}	4	18	9	14	6	5	27	9				5th	150
2022	(Malaysia) Nazim Azman	16	Ret	21	19	Ret	18	22	Ret	24	16	23	26	16	20	25	21	21	21				5th	150
2023		BHR; SPR	BHR; FEA	ALB; SPR	ALB; FEA	MCO; SPR	MCO; FEA	CAT; SPR	CAT; FEA	RBR; SPR	RBR; FEA	SIL; SPR	SIL; FEA	HUN; SPR	HUN; FEA	SPA; SPR	SPA; FEA	MNZ; SPR	MNZ; FEA				5th	170
2023	(Colombia) Sebastián Montoya	10	9	2	Ret	7	DSQ	26	7	9	20	8	10	Ret	24	Ret	6	12	Ret				5th	170
2023	(Italy) Gabriele Mini	17	8^{P}	4	3	11	1^{P F}	20	14	2	Ret	5	7	1	16	Ret	DNS	6	19				5th	170
2023	(United Kingdom) Luke Browning	Ret	5	17^{F}	8	8	4	2	Ret	11	22	14	Ret	16	12	8	23	DSQ	18				5th	170
2024		BHR; SPR	BHR; FEA	ALB; SPR	ALB; FEA	IMO; SPR	IMO; FEA	MCO; SPR	MCO; FEA	CAT; SPR	CAT; FEA	RBR; SPR	RBR; FEA	SIL; SPR	SIL; FEA	HUN; SPR	HUN; FEA	SPA; SPR	SPA; FEA	MNZ; SPR	MNZ; FEA		5th	166
2024	(United Kingdom) Luke Browning	15	1	28^{F}	4	26†	4	8	3	12	5^{F}	11	1^{P}	24	8^{P}	8	12	12	6	6	20		5th	166
2024	(Norway) Martinius Stenshorne	11	14	1	26	22	14	16	26^{F}	4	27	2	12			13	13	18	Ret	10	5^{F}		5th	166
2024	(Australia) James Wharton													18	21								5th	166
2024	(United Kingdom) Cian Shields	26	26	25	20	19	18	Ret	21	14	20	16	21	17	Ret	21	17	22	22	20	Ret		5th	166
2025		ALB; SPR	ALB; FEA	BHR; SPR	BHR; FEA	IMO; SPR	IMO; FEA	MCO; SPR	MCO; FEA	CAT; SPR	CAT; FEA	RBR; SPR	RBR; FEA	SIL; SPR	SIL; FEA	SPA; SPR	SPA; FEA	HUN; SPR	HUN; FEA	MNZ; SPR	MNZ; FEA		8th	90
2025	(Norway) Martinius Stenshorne	2^{F}	8	5	18	13	11	1^{F}	8	Ret	9	7^{F}	1	2	17	7	C	22	26	2	21		8th	90
2025	(Austria) Joshua Dufek	22	11	Ret	22	14	15	14	17														8th	90
2025	(Mexico) Jesse Carrasquedo Jr.									23	25	14	13										8th	90
2025	(United States) Nikita Johnson													27	23			23	21	13	20		8th	90
2025	(United Kingdom) Freddie Slater															26	C						8th	90
2025	(China) Gerrard Xie	16	18	21	26	24	20	18	19	20	21	21	17	24	25	11	C	10	Ret	15	Ret		8th	90
2026		ALB; SPR	ALB; FEA	MCO; SPR	MCO; FEA	CAT; SPR	CAT; FEA	RBR; SPR	RBR; FEA	SIL; SPR	SIL; FEA	SPA; SPR	SPA; FEA	HUN; SPR	HUN; FEA	MNZ; SPR	MNZ; FEA	MAD; SPR	MAD; FE1	MAD; FE2			8th	55
2026	(South Korea) Michael Shin	25	Ret	18	26	21	29	25	Ret	27	23	24	19	23	22	Ret	22	26	Ret	25			8th	55
2026	(Republic of Ireland) Fionn McLaughlin	15	14	13	21	20	26	28	24	9	19	23	13	19	16	14	Ret	13	Ret	14			8th	55
2026	(Japan) Jin Nakamura	13	9	7	23	18	22	3	5	13	15	1	8	Ret	Ret	12	20	7	5	15			8th	55

=== BRDC British Formula 3 Championship / GB3 Championship ===
GB3 Championship results
Year	Car	Drivers	Races	Wins	Poles	F/Laps	Podiums	Points	D.C.	T.C.
2020	Tatuus-Cosworth BF3-020	(India) Kush Maini	24	3	2	1	12	448	**2nd**	N/A
2020	Tatuus-Cosworth BF3-020	(United States) Reece Ushijima	24	0	0	1	2	244	11th	N/A
2021	Tatuus-Cosworth BF3-020	(Japan) Reece Ushijima	24	2	3	3	6	366	4th	**2nd**
2021	Tatuus-Cosworth BF3-020	(Australia) Bart Horsten	24	0	2	4	3	333	6th	**2nd**
2021	Tatuus-Cosworth BF3-020	(Mexico) Sebastián Álvarez	24	1	1	0	2	290	8th	**2nd**
2022	Tatuus-Cosworth MSV-022	(United Kingdom) Luke Browning	24	5	5	8	13	507	**1st**	**1st**
2022	Tatuus-Cosworth MSV-022	(United States) Bryce Aron	24	1	0	0	3	215	12th	**1st**
2022	Tatuus-Cosworth MSV-022	(United Kingdom) Cian Shields	24	1	0	0	3	186.5	13th	**1st**
2023	Tatuus-Cosworth MSV-022	(Republic of Ireland) Alex Dunne	23	5	1	8	7	466	**2nd**	4th
2023	Tatuus-Cosworth MSV-022	(Japan) Souta Arao	21	0	0	1	0	146	17th	4th
2023	Tatuus-Cosworth MSV-022	(South Korea) Michael Shin	21	0	0	0	0	144	18th	4th
2023	Tatuus-Cosworth MSV-022	(China) Gerrard Xie	22	1	0	1	1	128	20th	9th (Note: Hitech GP Academy entered in a partnership with Hillspeed)
2023	Tatuus-Cosworth MSV-022	(United Kingdom) Daniel Mavlyutov	23	4	0	0	4	116	22nd	9th
2024	Tatuus-Cosworth MSV-022	(Poland) Tymek Kucharczyk	23	4	3	9	11	443	**3rd**	**2nd**
2024	Tatuus-Cosworth MSV-022	(United Kingdom) William Macintyre	23	3	0	3	6	372	5th	**2nd**
2024	Tatuus-Cosworth MSV-022	(China) Gerrard Xie	23	1	2	0	3	261	7th	**2nd**
2025	Tatuus-Cosworth MSV-025	(United Kingdom) Deagen Fairclough	24	1	0	0	7	373	**3rd**	**2nd**
2025	Tatuus-Cosworth MSV-025	(United Arab Emirates) Keanu Al Azhari	24	1	1	0	5	310	6th	**2nd**
2025	Tatuus-Cosworth MSV-025	(United States) Nikita Johnson	12	0	0	0	2	138	16th	**2nd**
2026	Tatuus-Cosworth MSV-2026	(United Kingdom) Deagen Fairclough	22	7	5	7	7	401	**2nd**	4th
2026	Tatuus-Cosworth MSV-2026	(China) Yuhao Fu	23	0	0	0	1	138	15th	4th
2026	Tatuus-Cosworth MSV-2026	(Malta) Jacob Micallef	12	1	0	1	1	129	16th	4th
2026	Tatuus-Cosworth MSV-2026	(Japan) Jin Nakamura	5	1	0	1	2	96	19th	4th
2026	Tatuus-Cosworth MSV-2026	(Japan) Kanato Le	3	0	0	0	1	50	21st	4th
2026	Tatuus-Cosworth MSV-2026	(United Arab Emirates) Theo Palmer	3	0	0	0	0	0	NC	4th

* Season still in progress.

=== F4 British Championship ===
Year	Car	Drivers	Races	Wins	Poles	F/Laps	Points	D.C.	T.C.
2022	Tatuus F4-T421	(Republic of Ireland) Alex Dunne	27	11	11	11	412	**1st**	2nd
2022	Tatuus F4-T421	(Philippines) Eduardo Coseteng	30	1	0	3	198	7th	2nd
2022	Tatuus F4-T421	(United Kingdom) Oliver Stewart	30	1	0	1	108	10th	2nd
2022	Tatuus F4-T421	(United Kingdom) Daniel Mavlyutov	30	0	0	0	32	15th	2nd
2023	Tatuus F4-T421	(United Kingdom) William Macintyre	30	2	3	3	371	**2nd**	2nd
2023	Tatuus F4-T421	(Australia) James Piszcyk	30	2	1	2	220	5th	2nd
2023	Tatuus F4-T421	(Japan) Kanato Le	30	2	0	4	195	7th	2nd
2023	Tatuus F4-T421	(United Kingdom) Gabriel Stilp	30	1	0	1	164	9th	2nd
2024	Tatuus F4-T421	(United Kingdom) Deagen Fairclough	30	14	15	19	579.5	**1st**	1st
2024	Tatuus F4-T421	(United Kingdom) Reza Seewooruthun	30	2	1	3	271	**3rd**	1st
2024	Tatuus F4-T421	(South Africa) Mika Abrahams	14	1	0	0	76	13th	1st
2024	Tatuus F4-T421	(Mexico) Ernesto Rivera	3	0	0	0	18	22nd	1st
2024	Tatuus F4-T421	(Philippines) Bianca Bustamante	3	0	0	0	6	29th	1st
2024	Tatuus F4-T421	(United Kingdom) Thomas Bearman	5	0	0	0	1	32nd	1st
2025	Tatuus F4-T421	(Republic of Ireland) Fionn McLaughlin	30	5	3	8	363.5	**1st**	2nd
2025	Tatuus F4-T421	(United Kingdom) Thomas Bearman	30	1	1	1	153.5	8th	2nd
2025	Tatuus F4-T421	(Algeria) Leo Robinson	15	1	0	1	82	12th	2nd
2025	Tatuus F4-T421	(Australia) Xavier Avramides	29	0	0	0	52	15th	2nd
2025	Tatuus F4-T421	(United Kingdom) Joseph Smith	12	0	0	0	9	29th	2nd
2025	Tatuus F4-T421	(Netherlands) Nina Gademan	3	0	0	0	6	32nd	2nd
2026	Tatuus F4-T421	(United Arab Emirates) Theo Palmer	30	3	3	5	295.5	**2nd**	1st
2026	Tatuus F4-T421	(Sweden) Scott Kin Lindblom	27	1	0	2	151	7th	1st
2026	Tatuus F4-T421	(United Arab Emirates) Adam Al Azhari	30	1	2	1	131	8th	1st
2026	Tatuus F4-T421	(Switzerland) Chiara Bättig	30	0	0	1	102	13th	1st
2026	Tatuus F4-T421	(United Kingdom) Archie Owen	3	0	0	0	0	44th	1st

=== Euro 4 Championship ===
Year	Car	Drivers	Races	Wins	Poles	F/Laps	Points	D.C.	T.C.
2024	Tatuus F4-T421	(United Kingdom) Reza Seewooruthun	3	0	0	1	4	19th	6th
2024	Tatuus F4-T421	(United Kingdom) Deagen Fairclough	3	0	0	0	0	24th	6th
2024	Tatuus F4-T421	(United Kingdom) Thomas Bearman	3	0	0	0	0	37th	6th

=== Formula Winter Series ===
Year	Car	Drivers	Races	Wins	Poles	F/Laps	Points	D.C.	T.C.
2025	Tatuus F4-T421	(Algeria) Leo Robinson	12	3	1	2	153	**2nd**	**2nd**
2025	Tatuus F4-T421	(Republic of Ireland) Fionn McLaughlin	12	3	0	1	151	**3rd**	**2nd**
2025	Tatuus F4-T421	(United Kingdom) Thomas Bearman	12	0	0	0	60	8th	**2nd**
2025	Tatuus F4-T421	(Netherlands) Nina Gademan	9	0	0	0	13	15th	**2nd**
2025	Tatuus F4-T421	(United Kingdom) Emily Cotty	3	0	0	0	0	36th	**2nd**

=== F1 Academy ===
Year	Car	Drivers	Races	Wins	Poles	F/Laps	Podiums	Points	D.C.	T.C.
2025	Tatuus F4-T421	(Netherlands) Esmee Kosterman	2	0	0	0	0	6	15th	6th
2025	Tatuus F4-T421	(United Kingdom) Rachel Robertson	2	0	0	0	0	5	16th	6th
2025	Tatuus F4-T421	(Australia) Aiva Anagnostiadis	10	0	0	0	0	5	17th	6th
2025	Tatuus F4-T421	(United States) Payton Westcott	2	0	0	0	0	3	18th	6th
2025	Tatuus F4-T421	(Canada) Nicole Havrda	14	0	0	0	0	1	20th	6th
2025	Tatuus F4-T421	(Germany) Mathilda Paatz	3	0	0	0	0	0	21st	6th
2025	Tatuus F4-T421	(United Kingdom) Megan Bruce	2	0	0	0	0	0	22nd	6th
2025	Tatuus F4-T421	(United States) Ava Dobson	1	0	0	0	0	0	23rd	6th
2025	Tatuus F4-T421	(China) Shi Wei	2	0	0	0	0	0	24th	6th
2025	Tatuus F4-T421	(Saudi Arabia) Farah Al Yousef	2	0	0	0	0	0	25th	6th
2025	Tatuus F4-T421	(France) Lisa Billard	2	0	0	0	0	0	26th	6th
2026	Tatuus F4-T421	(United States) Ava Dobson								
2026	Tatuus F4-T421	(United Kingdom) Rachel Robertson								
2026	Tatuus F4-T421	(China) Shi Wei								
2026	Tatuus F4-T421	(Canada) Autumn Fisher								
2026	Tatuus F4-T421	(Romania) Zoe Florescu								
2026	Tatuus F4-T421	(Switzerland) Chiara Bättig								
2026	Tatuus F4-T421	(Sweden) Alexia Danielsson								
2026	Tatuus F4-T421	(Spain) Luna Fluxá								

* Season still in progress.

=== Formula Regional Oceania Trophy ===
Year	Car	Drivers	Races	Wins	Poles	F/Laps	Points	D.C.	T.C.
2026	Tatuus FT-60-Toyota	(Japan) Jin Nakamura	15	0	2	1	293	4th	**3rd**
2026	Tatuus FT-60-Toyota	(Japan) Kanato Le	14	1	0	0	272	6th	**3rd**
2026	Tatuus FT-60-Toyota	(Republic of Ireland) Fionn McLaughlin	15	0	0	0	124	13th	**3rd**
2026	Tatuus FT-60-Toyota	(Finland) Kalle Rovanperä	11	0	0	0	107	16th	**3rd**

=== Eurocup-3 ===
Year	Car	Drivers	Races	Wins	Poles	F/Laps	Points	D.C.	T.C.
2026	Dallara 326-TOM'S	(United Arab Emirates) Keanu Al Azhari	19	4	4	5	225	**2nd**	**3rd**
2026	Dallara 326-TOM'S	(Argentina) Gino Trappa	19	0	0	0	36	14th	**3rd**
2026	Dallara 326-TOM'S	(Argentina) Santino Panetta	19	0	0	0	36	15th	**3rd**
2026	Dallara 326-TOM'S	(Bulgaria) Stefan Bostandjiev	18	0	0	0	0	24th	**3rd**

=== Formula 4 UAE Championship / UAE4 Series ===
Year	Car	Drivers	Races	Wins	Poles	F/Laps	Points	D.C.	T.C.
2022	Tatuus F4-T421	(Republic of Ireland) Alex Dunne	20	2	0	1	168	6th	4th
2022	Tatuus F4-T421	(United Kingdom) Luke Browning	8	0	0	0	64	11th	4th
2022	Tatuus F4-T421	(United Kingdom) Oliver Gray	8	0	0	0	41	15th	4th
2022	Tatuus F4-T421	(Mexico) Ricardo Escotto	20	0	0	0	0	25th	10th (Note: Entered as Cram - Hitech GP)
2022	Tatuus F4-T421	(India) Anshul Gandhi	20	0	0	0	0	32nd	10th
2023	Tatuus F4-T421	(United Kingdom) Arvid Lindblad	15	1	1	1	107	5th	4th
2023	Tatuus F4-T421	(United Kingdom) William Macintyre	15	0	0	0	28	14th	4th
2023	Tatuus F4-T421	(Australia) James Piszcyk	15	0	0	0	25	15th	11th
2023	Tatuus F4-T421	(United Kingdom) Kanato Le	15	0	0	0	22	17th	11th
2024	Tatuus F4-T421	(United Kingdom) Deagen Fairclough	15	0	0	0	75	7th	4th
2024	Tatuus F4-T421	(United Kingdom) Gabriel Stilp	15	1	0	0	73	9th	4th
2024	Tatuus F4-T421	(United Kingdom) Reza Seewooruthun	15	0	0	0	24	16th	4th
2024	Tatuus F4-T421	(United Kingdom) Sebastian Murray	15	0	0	0	12	19th	4th
2026	Tatuus F4-T421	(Sweden) Scott Kin Lindblom	12	0	1	0	71	7th	4th
2026	Tatuus F4-T421	(United Arab Emirates) Theo Palmer	12	0	0	0	22	15th	4th
2026	Tatuus F4-T421	(Qatar) Bader Al Sulaiti	12	1	0	1	29	12th	8th
2026	Tatuus F4-T421	(Qatar) Nasser Al Thani	10	0	0	0	0	44th	8th

=== Formula 4 CEZ Championship ===
Year	Car	Drivers	Races	Wins	Poles	F/Laps	Points	D.C.	T.C.
2026	Tatuus F4-T421	(United Kingdom) Archie Owen							

== Former series results ==
=== F3 Asian Winter Series ===
Year	Car	Drivers	Races	Wins	Poles	FLaps	Points	D.C.	T.C.
2019	Tatuus F3 T-318	(Netherlands) Rinus VeeKay	9	4	2	4	184	1st	1st
2019	Tatuus F3 T-318	(France) Alessandro Ghiretti	9	0	0	0	106	3rd	1st
2019	Tatuus F3 T-318	(United Kingdom) Pavan Ravishankar	9	0	0	0	73	5th	1st
2019	Tatuus F3 T-318	(United Kingdom) Dan Ticktum	6	0	2	0	38	9th	1st
2019	Tatuus F3 T-318	(United Kingdom) Max Fewtrell	3	0	0	0	20	11th	1st
2019	Tatuus F3 T-318	(Australia) Jack Doohan	3	0	0	0	0	NC	1st

=== FIA European Formula 3 Championship ===
Year	Car	Drivers	Starts	Wins	Poles	F.Laps	Points	D.C.	T.C.
2016	Dallara F312-Mercedes HWA	(United Kingdom) George Russell	30	2	3	3	194	3rd	2nd
2016	Dallara F312-Mercedes HWA	(United Kingdom) Ben Barnicoat	30	2	0	0	117	7th	2nd
2016	Dallara F312-Mercedes HWA	(Russia) Nikita Mazepin	30	0	0	0	5	19th	2nd
2016	Dallara F312-Mercedes HWA	(United Kingdom) Alexander Sims	3	0	0	0	-	NC†	2nd
2017	Dallara F317-Mercedes HWA	(United Kingdom) Jake Hughes	30	1	2	2	207	5th	4th
2017	Dallara F317-Mercedes HWA	(Estonia) Ralf Aron	30	0	1	1	123	9th	4th
2017	Dallara F317-Mercedes HWA	(Russia) Nikita Mazepin	30	0	0	1	108	10th	4th
2017	Dallara F317-Mercedes HWA	(Japan) Tadasuke Makino	27	0	0	0	57	15th	4th
2018	Dallara F317-Mercedes HWA	(Spain) Álex Palou	30	0	0	1	204	7th	3rd
2018	Dallara F317-Mercedes HWA	(United Kingdom) Enaam Ahmed	30	2	2	1	174	9th	3rd
2018	Dallara F317-Mercedes HWA	(United Kingdom) Ben Hingeley	30	0	0	0	22	17th	3rd
2018	Dallara F317-Mercedes HWA	(Macau) Charles Leong	3	0	0	0	0	26th	3rd

^{†} As Sims was a guest driver, he was ineligible for points.

=== British Formula 3 International Series ===
Year	Car	Drivers	Starts	Wins	Poles	F.Laps	Points	D.C.
2003	Dallara F303-Renault	(United Kingdom) Danny Watts	24	1	3	2	125	5th
2003	Dallara F303-Renault	(France) Eric Salignon	22	0	1	1	43	12th
2003	Dallara F303-Renault	(United Kingdom) Andrew Thompson	24	0	0	0	18	19th
2003	Dallara F303-Renault	(Brazil) Fabio Carbone	2	0	0	0	1	25th
2004	Dallara F304-Renault	(Brazil) Lucas di Grassi	23	2	2	0	130	8th
2004	Dallara F304-Renault	(Estonia) Marko Asmer	23	0	0	2	87	10th
2004	Dallara F304-Renault	(United Kingdom) Andrew Thompson	23	0	0	0	36	15th
2004	Dallara F304-Renault	(United Kingdom) James Walker	23	0	0	0	20	18th
2005	Dallara F305-Mercedes HWA	(Estonia) Marko Asmer	20	0	2	1	163	4th
2005	Dallara F305-Mercedes HWA	(United Kingdom) Tim Bridgman	18	0	0	0	16	15th
2006	Dallara F306-Mercedes HWA	(United Kingdom) James Jakes	22	0	0	1	96	8th
2006	Dallara F306-Mercedes HWA	(United Kingdom) James Walker	22	0	0	0	92	9th
2006	Dallara F306-Mercedes HWA	(Mexico) Salvador Durán	20	0	0	0	54	10th
2007	Dallara F307-Mercedes HWA	(Austria) Walter Grubmüller	22	0	0	0	7	16th
2007	Dallara F307-Mercedes HWA	(Estonia) Marko Asmer	22	11	11	9	293	1st
2008	Dallara F308-Mercedes HWA	(United Kingdom) Max Chilton	22	0	2	1	72	10th
2008	Dallara F308-Mercedes HWA	(Austria) Walter Grubmüller	22	0	0	0	44	14th
2009	Dallara F309-Mercedes HWA	(Austria) Walter Grubmüller	20	2	2	1	188	2nd
2009	Dallara F309-Mercedes HWA	(Netherlands) Renger van der Zande	16	3	4	7	178	3rd
2010	Dallara F310-Volkswagen	(United Kingdom) William Buller	30	0	0	0	111	8th
2010	Dallara F310-Volkswagen	(Brazil) Gabriel Dias	30	2	0	1	135	6th
2011	Dallara F308-Volkswagen; Dallara F310-Volkswagen	(Brazil) Pietro Fantin	30	1	2	2	119	8th
2011	Dallara F308-Volkswagen; Dallara F310-Volkswagen	(United Kingdom) Riki Christodoulou	9	1	0	0	51	12th
2011	Dallara F308-Volkswagen; Dallara F310-Volkswagen	(Portugal) António Félix da Costa	6	0	0	1	51	13th
2011	Dallara F308-Volkswagen; Dallara F310-Volkswagen	(Brazil) Pedro Nunes	3	0	0	0	10	19th
2011	Dallara F308-Volkswagen; Dallara F310-Volkswagen	(Russia) Max Snegirev	9	0	0	0	2	24th
2011	Dallara F308-Volkswagen; Dallara F310-Volkswagen	(Spain) Bruno Méndez	3	0	0	0	1	25th

=== F3 Asian Championship / Formula Regional Asian Championship ===
Year	Car	Drivers	Races	Wins	Poles	F/Laps	Points	D.C.	T.C.
2018	Tatuus F3 T-318	(United Kingdom) Raoul Hyman	15	1	0	2	227	1st	1st
2018	Tatuus F3 T-318	(United Kingdom) Jake Hughes	9	9	6	8	225	2nd	1st
2018	Tatuus F3 T-318	(Macau) Charles Leong	15	0	0	0	145	4th	1st
2018	Tatuus F3 T-318	(United Kingdom) Ben Hingeley	3	1	0	0	43	10th	1st
2018	Tatuus F3 T-318	(United Kingdom) Harrison Scott	3	0	0	0	26	14th	1st
2019	Tatuus F3 T-318	(Japan) Ukyo Sasahara	15	8	7	7	301	1st	1st
2019	Tatuus F3 T-318	(United Kingdom) Jack Doohan	15	5	1	4	276	2nd	1st
2019	Tatuus F3 T-318	(Australia) Jackson Walls	9	0	0	0	90	6th	1st
2019-20	Tatuus F3 T-318	(Russia) Nikita Mazepin	15	0	0	0	186	3rd	4th
2019-20	Tatuus F3 T-318	(United Kingdom) Jake Hughes	6	0	0	1	24	14th	4th
2019-20	Tatuus F3 T-318	(Italy) Alessio Deledda	15	0	0	0	21	15th	4th
2019-20	Tatuus F3 T-318	(Japan) Ukyo Sasahara	15	3	4	1	0	NC†	4th
2021	Tatuus F3 T-318	(Israel) Roy Nissany	15	0	0	0	99	5th	2nd
2021	Tatuus F3 T-318	(Japan) Ayumu Iwasa	15	0	0	0	81	8th	2nd
2021	Tatuus F3 T-318	(United Kingdom) Reece Ushijima	15	0	0	0	45	12th	2nd
2021	Tatuus F3 T-318	(Czech Republic) Roman Staněk	15	0	0	0	60	10th	2nd
2022	Tatuus F3 T-318	(France) Isack Hadjar	15	2	1	2	134	3rd	2nd
2022	Tatuus F3 T-318	(Italy) Gabriele Minì	12	2	1	1	130	4th	2nd
2022	Tatuus F3 T-318	(Italy) Leonardo Fornaroli	9	0	0	0	22	17th	2nd
2022	Tatuus F3 T-318	(Switzerland) Joshua Dufek	9	0	0	0	12	18th	2nd
2022	Tatuus F3 T-318	(France) Owen Tangavelou	9	0	0	0	0	31st	2nd
2022	Tatuus F3 T-318	(France) Vladislav Lomko	3	0	0	0	0	34th	2nd

=== Formula Regional Middle East Championship ===
Year	Car	Drivers	Races	Wins	Poles	F/Laps	Points	D.C.	T.C.
2023	Tatuus F3 T-318	(Colombia) Sebastián Montoya	15	0	0	0	12	21st	7th
2023	Tatuus F3 T-318	(Italy) Gabriele Minì	6	0	1	0	10	22nd	7th
2023	Tatuus F3 T-318	(United Kingdom) Luke Browning	6	0	0	0	8	26th	7th
2023	Tatuus F3 T-318	(United States) Jak Crawford	3	0	0	0	4	28th	7th
2023	Tatuus F3 T-318	(United Kingdom) Daniel Mavlyutov	15	0	0	0	0	32nd	7th

== Timeline ==
Current series
FIA Formula 3 Championship	2019–present
FIA Formula 2 Championship	2020–present
GB3 Championship	2020–present
UAE4 Series	2022–2024, 2026–present
F4 British Championship	2022–present
Euro 4 Championship	2024–present
F1 Academy	2025–present
Formula Regional Oceania Trophy	2026–present
Eurocup-3	2026–present
Formula 4 CEZ Championship	2026–present
Former series
British Formula 3 International Series	2003–2011
GP2 Series	2005
Formula 3 Euro Series	2006
Formula 3 Sudamericana	2009–2013
Brazilian Formula Three Championship	2014–2017
Mercedes-Benz Challenge	2015
Campeonato Brasileiro de Turismo	2015–2016
FIA Formula 3 European Championship	2016–2018
Formula Regional Asian Championship	2018–2022
W Series	2019
Formula Regional Middle East Championship	2023
Formula Winter Series	2025

== See also ==
- Atech Grand Prix
- ART Grand Prix
- 2019 W Series
