= André Moraes Jr. =

Brazilian racing driver (born 2006)

Andre Moraes Jr.
- Nationality: Brazilian
- Born: 3 October 2006 (age 20) São Paulo, Brazil

André Moraes Jr. (born 13 March 2006) is a Brazilian racing driver who is set to compete with Scuderia Chiarelli in Stock Car Pro Series.

== Complete Stock Car Pro Series results ==
(key) (Races in bold indicate pole position) (Races in italics indicate fastest lap)

Year	Team	Car	1	2	3	4	5	6	7	8	9	10	11	12	13	14	15	16	17	18	19	20	21	22	23	Rank	Points
2022	Hot Car Competições	Chevrolet Cruze	INT; 1 Ret	GOI; 1 Ret	GOI; 2 DNS	VCA; 1	VCA; 2	RIO; 1	RIO; 2	BRA; 1	BRA; 2	BRA; 1	BRA; 2	INT; 1	INT; 2	SCZ; 1	SCZ; 2	VCA; 1	VCA; 2	GOI; 1	GOI; 2	GOI; 1	GOI; 2	BRA; 1	BRA; 2	42nd	0
