= Hot Car Competições =

Brazilian Auto Racing Team

(Brazil) Hot Car Competições
- Founded: 1990
- Founder(s): Amadeu Rodrigues
- Team principal(s): Bárbara Rodrigues
- Current series: Stock Car Brasil
- Current drivers: (Brazil) Gaetano Di Mauro (Brazil) Lucas Kohl
- Noted drivers: Gustavo Lima; Sérgio Jimenez
- Website: http://hotcarcompeticoes.com.br/

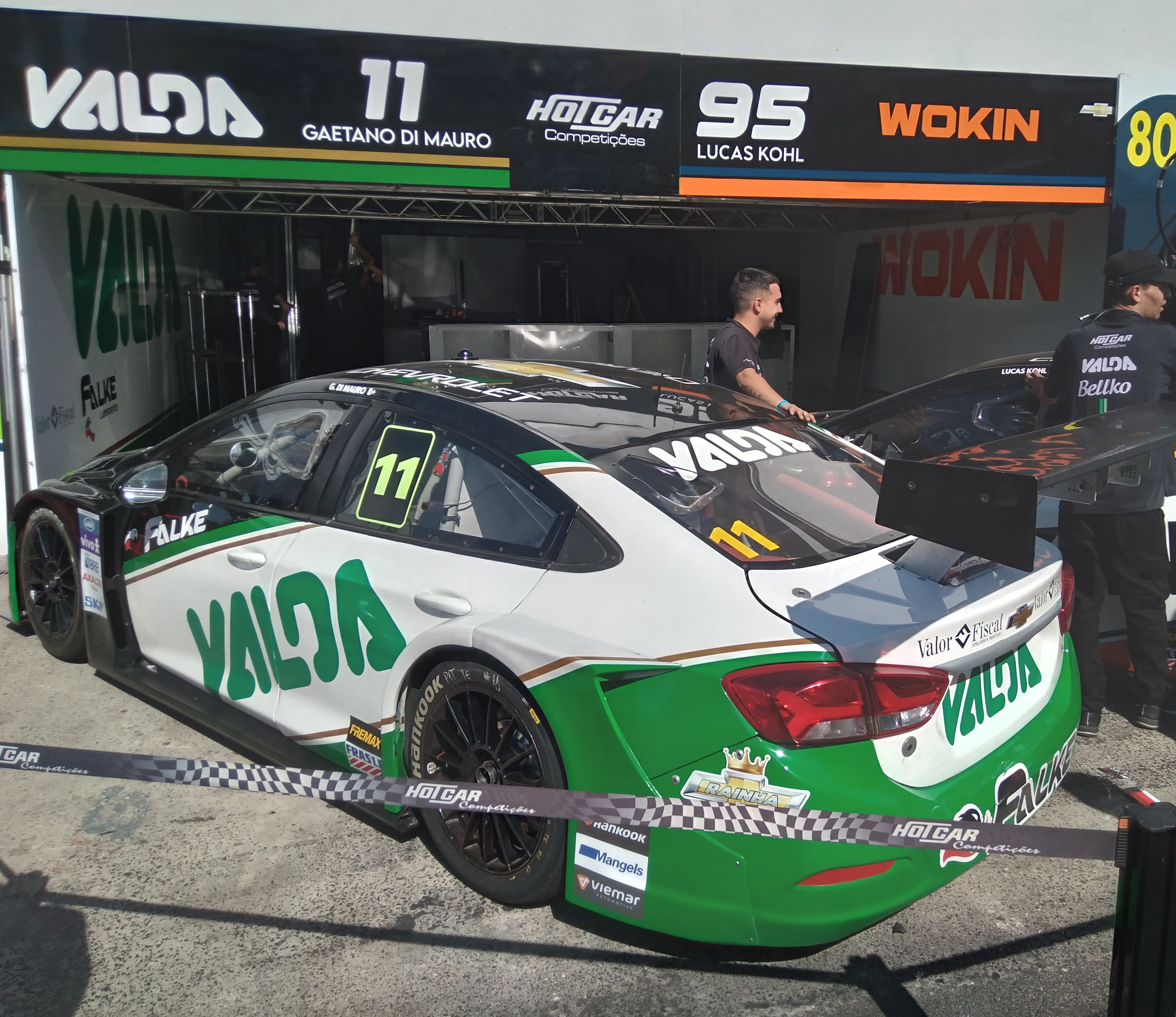
Gaetano Di Mauro's No. 11 car in 2023

Hot Car Competições, was a Brazilian auto racing team based in Cajamar, São Paulo. Founded in 1990 by Amadeu Rodrigues, the team currently competes in Stock Car Brasil with Gaetano Di Mauro and Lucas Kohl.
